= Danijela Nestorović =

Serbian politician

- Данијела Несторовић

Member of the National Assembly of the Republic of Serbia
- Incumbent
- Assumed office 1 August 2022

Personal details
- Born: 1974 (age 51–52)
- Party: EU (2021–present); Together (2022–23)
- Occupation: Lawyer, Politician

Danijela Nestorović (Serbian Cyrillic: Данијела Несторовић; born 1974) is a Serbian lawyer, environmental activist, and politician. She has served in the National Assembly of Serbia since 2022 as a member of the Ecological Uprising (EU) movement.

== Private career and activism ==
Nestorović is a lawyer in Belgrade. She was a leading figure in the 2021–2022 Serbian environmental protests and helped organize the legal defence of activists who were arrested for participating in these events. In January 2022, she announced plans for citizens to form roadblocks at different locations in Serbia as an act of civil disobedience against Rio Tinto's proposed jadarite mining near the Jadar River. In May of the same year, she drew attention to underground water pollution in the village of Lukavac, where the Canadian mining company Euro Lithium was operating, as a means of highlighting unsafe mining practices across the country.

== Politician ==
Nestorović was a founding member of Ecological Uprising in 2021. The movement contested the 2022 parliamentary election as part of the We Must (Moramo) coalition; Nestorović received the fourth position on its electoral list and was elected when the coalition won thirteen seats. The Serbian Progressive Party (SNS) and its allies won the election, and the parties of We Must served afterward in opposition.

Nestorović also appeared in the seventieth position on the We Must coalition's list in the concurrent 2022 Belgrade City Assembly election. Election from this position was not a viable prospect, and she was not elected when the list won thirteen mandates at the city level.

In June 2022, Ecological Uprising joined with Together for Serbia, the civic platform Action, and the Assembly of Free Serbia to create a new party called Together (Zajedno!). As part of the merger agreement, Ecological Uprising kept its own autonomous organization within the larger party. Nestorović became a member of Together while also remaining part of the Ecological Uprising group. In her first assembly term, she was a member of the judiciary committee (Note: Formally known as the Committee on the Judiciary, Public Administration, and Local Self-Government.) and a deputy member of the committee on constitutional and legislative issues.

In early October 2022, she accused the Serbian police of intimidating environmental activists during protests in Majdanpek. She became the legal representative of an activist detained in the community and announced later in the month that she had filed criminal charges against police inspectors from Kladovo who she says "brutally beat" her client.

Ecological Uprising withdrew from Together in September 2023 and once again became a separate organization. The group contested the 2023 parliamentary election as party of the multi-party Serbia Against Violence (SPN) coalition; as Ecological Uprising is not a legally recognized party, its candidates were officially endorsed by the People's Movement of Serbia (NPS). Nestorović received the fifth position on the SPN list and was re-elected when it won sixty-five mandates. The Progressives and their allies won a majority victory, and Ecological Uprising remains part of the opposition.

Nestorović is now the deputy leader of Ecological Uprising's assembly group. She is a member of the committee on constitutional and legislative issues and the committee on human and minority rights and gender equality, a deputy member of the committee on Kosovo and Metohija, and a member of a working group for the improvement of the electoral process. In early 2024, she participated in a reform of Serbia's registry of voters.
