= Aleksandar Prodanović =

Serbian politician

- Александар Продановић
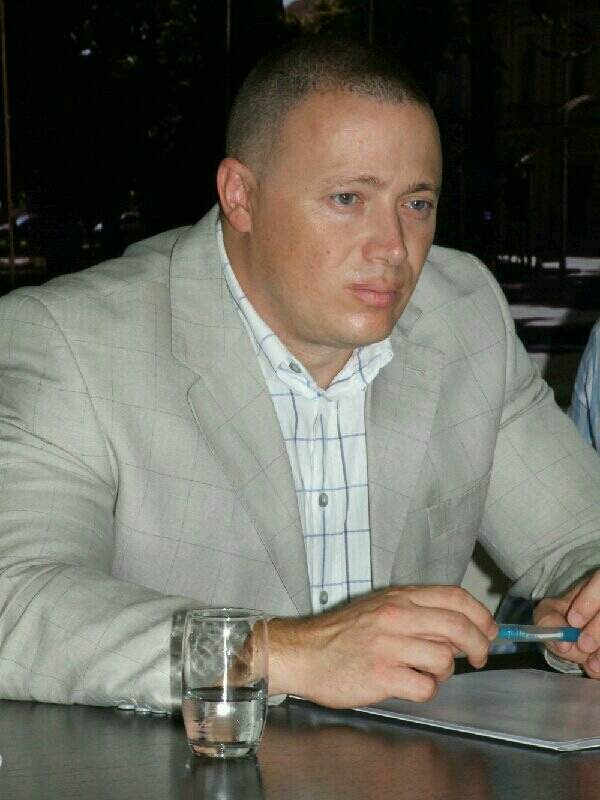

Member of the National Assembly of the Republic of Serbia
- In office 12 June 2002 – 12 February 2004

Member of the Assembly of Serbia and Montenegro
- In office 2004–2006

President of the Municipal Assembly of Sremska Mitrovica
- In office 2000–2012

Member of the Municipal Assembly of Sremska Mitrovica
- In office 2000–2020

Personal details
- Born: 13 February 1969 (age 57) Sremska Mitrovica
- Party: Democratic Party (Serbia) (1999–2012); Together for Serbia (2012–2022); Together (2022–present)
- Domestic partner: Dr Nataša Paprić
- Children: 2
- Education: University of Belgrade, Faculty of Mechanical Engineering
- Occupation: Politician, engineer

Aleksandar Prodanović (Serbian Cyrillic: Александар Продановић; born 13 February 1969) is a Serbian politician. He has served in the National Assembly of Serbia and the Assembly of Serbia and Montenegro and has held high municipal office in Sremska Mitrovica. From 2007 to 2012, he was the head of Serbia's water directorate. Prodanović was a member of the Democratic Party (DS) until 2013, when he joined Together for Serbia (ZZS).

== Private career ==
Prodanović was born in Sremska Mitrovica, in what was then the Socialist Autonomous Province of Vojvodina in the Socialist Republic of Serbia, Socialist Federal Republic of Yugoslavia. He graduated from the University of Belgrade Faculty of Mechanical Engineering and later owned a private business and worked for Srem gas.

== Politician ==
=== Late Milošević years (1999–2000) ===
Prodanović was the leader of the Democratic Party's municipal committee in Sremska Mitrovica in 1999. During this period, the DS was part of the Alliance for Change, a coalition of parties opposed to Slobodan Milošević's administration.

The Alliance for Change was succeeded by the Democratic Opposition of Serbia (DOS) in January 2000. DOS candidate Vojislav Koštunica defeated Milošević in the 2000 Yugoslavian presidential election, a watershed moment in Serbian and Yugoslavian politics. The DOS won a majority victory in Sremska Mitrovica in the concurrent 2000 Serbian local elections, and Prodanović was chosen afterward as the leader of the assembly's executive board (i.e., effectively the prime minister of the municipal government).

=== Parliamentarian and local official (2000–06) ===
Prodanović received the 214th position (out of 250) on the DOS's electoral list for the 2000 Serbian parliamentary election, which was held three months after the Yugoslavian election. The alliance won a majority victory with 176 seats, and he was not initially included in its assembly delegation. (From 2000 to 2011, Serbian parliamentary mandates were awarded to sponsoring parties or coalitions rather than to individual candidates, and it was common practice for the mandates to be awarded out of numerical order. Prodanović could have been given a mandate despite his low position on this list, but he was not.)

He received a mandate under somewhat dubious conditions as the replacement for another parliamentarian on 12 June 2002, when the DOS withdrew the accreditation for several Democratic Party of Serbia (DSS) delegates. This took place against the backdrop of the DSS's formal departure from the DOS. The removal of the DSS delegates was later annulled on technical grounds, and Prodanović's mandate was revoked.

The DOS alliance ended in late 2003, and the DS contested the 2003 Serbian parliamentary election at the head of its own coalition. Prodanović appeared in the twenty-second position on the party's list and received a mandate after the list won thirty-seven seats. His term was brief. By virtue its performance in the 2003 election, the DS had the right to appoint thirteen members to the federal assembly of Serbia and Montenegro. Prodanović was chosen as one of his party's federal representatives on 12 February 2004 and so resigned from the national assembly.

The DS was not included in the government of Serbia and Montenegro in April 2004, and its members left the assembly before the new ministers were voted in. Prodanović later mocked the appointment of Vuk Drašković as the federation's minister of foreign affairs, saying, "how will Vuk, when he comes down from Ravna Gora with a knife in one hand and a dagger in the other hand, explain to the international community that we are a civilized nation."

In May 2004, Prodanović was appointed to Serbia and Montenegro's powerful security services committee. He served in the federal assembly until May 2006, when it ceased to exist following Montenegro's declaration of independence.

Prodanović was re-elected to the Sremska Mitrovica assembly in the 2004 Serbian local elections. The DS, DSS, and other parties formed a local coalition government, and Prodanović served as president of the municipal assembly.

=== State administrator and local official (2007–12) ===
Prodanović appeared in the 195th position on the DS's mostly alphabetical electoral list in the 2007 Serbian parliamentary election. The DS formed an unstable coalition government with the DSS and other parties after the election. Prodanović was not given an assembly mandate but was instead appointed to head Serbia's water directorate in October 2007.

The DS–DSS alliance broke down in early 2008, and a new parliamentary election was held in May of that year. The DS contested the election at the head of the For a European Serbia (ZES) alliance, and Prodanović appeared on the alliance's list. ZES won 102 seats, becoming the largest group in the assembly but falling short of a majority. After complicated negotiations, the DS-led alliance formed a new coalition government with the Socialist Party of Serbia (SPS). Prodanović was again not given an assembly mandate but continued to head the water directorate.

Prodanović also appeared in the second position on the ZES alliance's list in the 2008 Serbian local elections in Sremska Mitrovica and was granted a new mandate when the list won a plurality victory with twenty-two seats. The DSS at first formed a new coalition government in the city with the far-right Serbian Radical Party (SRS), but this arrangement soon fell apart, and in July 2008 the DSS and DS formed a new local government with Prodanović again in the role of assembly president. He served in this office for the remainder of the assembly's term.

In early 2012, Prodanović oversaw Serbia's response to the freezing of the Danube River and the subsequent threat of floods from fast-melting snow.

=== Since 2012 ===
Serbia's electoral laws were reformed in 2011, such that all mandates were awarded to candidates on successful lists in numerical order. Prodanović appeared in the lead position on the DS's list in Sremska Mitrovica for the 2012 local elections and was re-elected when the list won a plurality victory with eighteen seats. A new local government was formed without the DS, and Prodanović led his party's group in opposition. The DS was also defeated by the Serbian Progressive Party (SNS) in the concurrent 2012 parliamentary election, and Prodanović's term as head of the water directorate came to an end shortly thereafter.

The Democratic Party became increasingly factionalized after its defeat in 2012. Prodanović was removed as leader of the DS Sremska Mitrovica board in August of that year at the initiative of the party's Vojvodina provincial committee. Goran Ivić, who was appointed as his successor, described Prodanović's leadership of the party as a "reign of terror." For his part, Prodanović later said that he was not given an explanation for the local board's dissolution, which he blamed on "the complete inability of the current DS leadership to accept a different opinion in the party." He ultimately left the DS to join the breakaway Together for Serbia party.

Together for Serbia contested the 2014 Serbian parliamentary election on a coalition electoral list led by former DS leader Boris Tadić. Prodanović appeared in the 171st position on the list; this was too low for election to be a realistic prospect, and he was not elected when the list won eighteen seats. He later led a coalition United Opposition of Mitrovica list in the 2016 local elections and was re-elected to the city assembly when the list won three seats.

Prodanović's house was fired on by a moving car in June 2016. He described this as an assassination attempt that was politically inspired.

Together for Serbia boycotted the 2020 Serbian local elections, and Prodanović was not a candidate for re-election that year.
