= Serbia Against Violence (coalition) =

Political coalition in Serbia

Serbia Against Violence Србија против насиља
- Abbreviation: SPN
- Representatives: Marinika Tepić; Miroslav Aleksić; Radomir Lazović; Vladimir Obradović; Dobrica Veselinović; Mila Popović
- Founded: 27 October 2023
- Dissolved: 23 April 2024
- Preceded by: United for the Victory of Serbia; We Must
- Succeeded by: We Choose Belgrade
- Ideology: Anti-corruption; Pro-Europeanism
- Political position: Big tent
- Colours: Red
- Slogan: Promena je počela; ("Change has begun")

Website
- srbija-protiv-nasilja.rs

Serbia Against Violence (Serbian: Србија против насиља, romanised: Srbija protiv nasilja, SPN) was a political coalition of opposition political parties in Serbia. Formalised in October 2023, SPN took part in the parliamentary, Vojvodina provincial, Belgrade City Assembly elections and elections for city assemblies in other cities, all of which were held on 17 December 2023.

The SPN was formed out of the Serbia Against Violence protests that began after the Belgrade elementary school and Mladenovac and Smederevo mass shootings in May 2023. The cooperation between the parties organising the protests increased during the protests, leading them to create a coalition. Marinika Tepić and Miroslav Aleksić were the representatives for the parliamentary election, while Vladimir Obradović and Dobrica Veselinović were the representatives for the Belgrade City Assembly election. In the December 2023 elections, SPN won 65 seats in the National Assembly of Serbia, 43 in the City Assembly of Belgrade and 30 in the Assembly of Vojvodina. The coalition ceased to exist in April 2024 due to a dispute over whether to participate in the 2024 Belgrade City Assembly election. The group that took part in the election was named We Choose Belgrade.

SPN was a pro-European coalition that was opposed to the ruling Serbian Progressive Party. Its representatives declared support for anti-corruption and environmental measures, increased pensions and salaries, investments in education, health care, and public transport, and introducing progressive taxation.

== History ==
=== Background ===
In May 2023, two mass shootings, in a Belgrade elementary school and in the villages near Mladenovac and Smederevo, occurred. These shootings caused mass protests in Serbia, named Serbia Against Violence. Despite initially being organised by the Democratic Party (DS), Do not let Belgrade drown (NDB), Party of Freedom and Justice (SSP), Movement of Free Citizens (PSG), People's Party (Narodna), and Together (Zajedno) opposition parties, no party signs were reported to be seen at the protests. The People's Movement of Serbia (NPS) and Ecological Uprising (EU) joined as organisers in August 2023, while Narodna was excluded as an organiser in the meantime.

The cooperation between opposition parties organising the protests increased during the protests. Marinika Tepić, one of the vice-presidents of SSP, said in August 2023 that the creation of an electoral alliance of political parties organising the protests was possible. In the same month, DS, Together, and Serbia Centre (SRCE), led by Zdravko Ponoš, signed a cooperation agreement, establishing greater cooperation between the parties. Radomir Lazović of ZLF previously announced in July 2023 that ZLF had prepared a framework principles of cooperation between the parties; this was revealed in September 2023 as the Agreement for Victory, a document that was signed by the organisers of the protests.

=== Formation ===
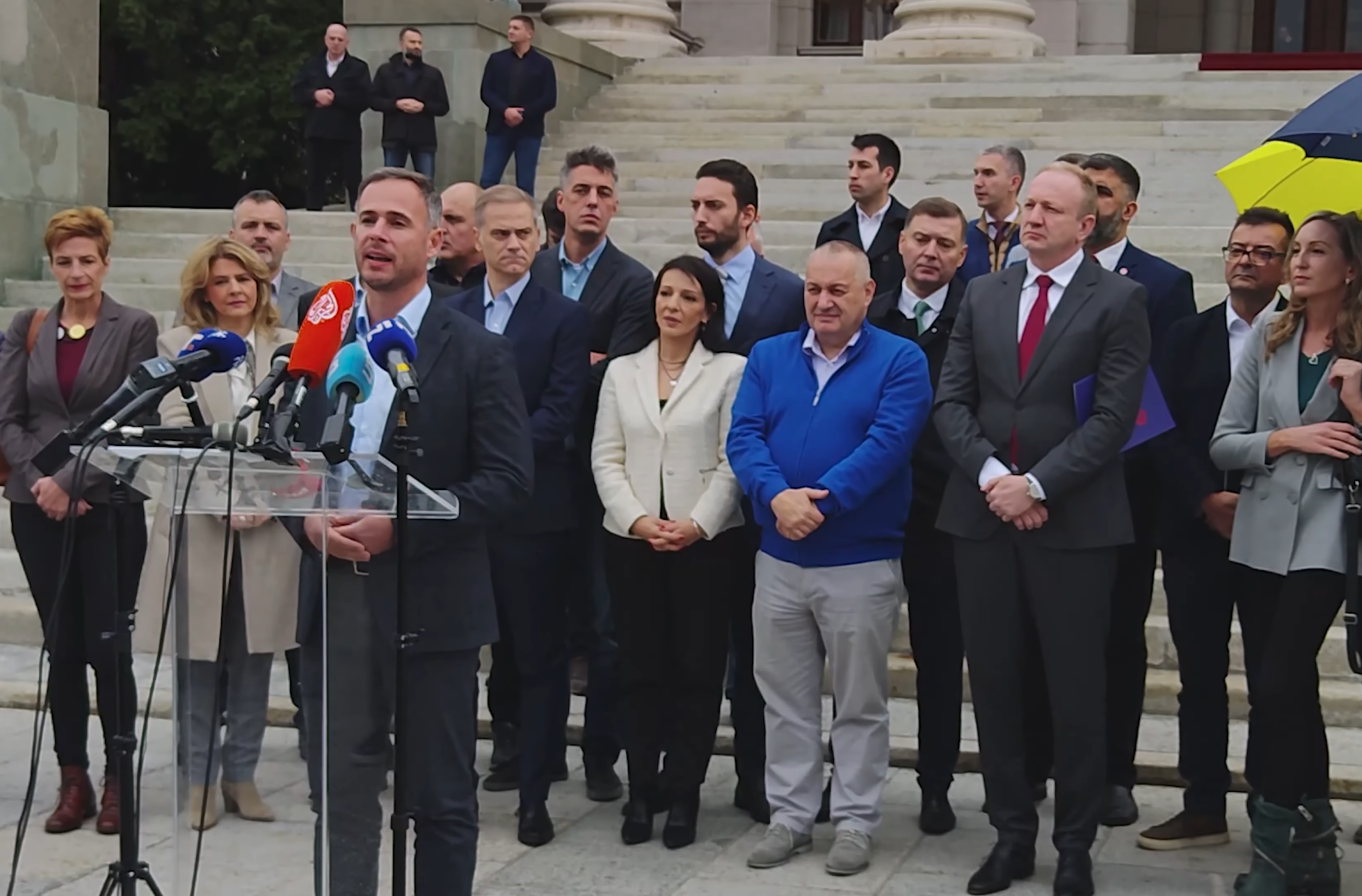
SPN was formalised in October 2023 as an electoral alliance for the 2023 elections

In early October 2023, the parties held several meetings to discuss the creation of a joint coalition. The agreement between the parties was reached on 26 October while a day later, the coalition, named Serbia Against Violence (SPN), was presented to the public. It was announced that Tepić and Miroslav Aleksić of NPS would be the representatives of SPN for the parliamentary elections, while Lazović would be featured first on its electoral list. Vladimir Obradović, an independent politician, and Dobrica Veselinović were presented as the representatives of SPN for the Belgrade City Assembly election, with Obradović as the mayoral candidate. It was also announced that ZLF would have the most candidates for the Belgrade City Assembly election, while Mila Popović, the head of the Forward to Europe (PE) councillor group, would be featured first on its electoral list for Belgrade. SPN announced that it would also contest the Vojvodina provincial election.

Members of SPN signed a coalition agreement on 3 November. SPN submitted its electoral list to RIK on 8 November and RIK confirmed it a day later. In Belgrade, its list was submitted on 12 November and was confirmed on 13 November. On 14 November, it was announced that the SPN electoral list for the Vojvodina provincial election would be led by Tepić and Mihajlo Brkić of SRCE. The electoral list for Vojvodina was confirmed on 22 November.

=== Elections and aftermath ===
SPN officially began campaigning on 16 November, holding its first convention in Belgrade. It later continued campaigning in cities and municipalities such as Niš, Leskovac, Trstenik, and Valjevo. Besides the conventions, Lazović announced that SPN activists would conduct on-street campaigns and door-to-door campaigns. On 30 November, SPN signed a cooperation agreement with the Association of Trade Unions of Retired Military Personnel of Serbia. On the same day, Lazović, Biljana Đorđević, Borko Stefanović, Natan Albahari, and Ksenija Marković, representing the SPN coalition, met with Bundestag representatives of the ruling political parties of Germany. "Change has begun" (promena je počela) was the coalition's slogan during the campaign. Attended by several thousand supporters, SPN held its last campaign on 12 December in Belgrade. In the parliamentary election, SPN won 65 seats, while in the Belgrade City Assembly election, SPN won 43 seats. In the Vojvodina provincial election, SPN received 30 seats.

In the aftermath of the elections, SPN organised anti-government protests, beginning on 18 December. SPN called for the annulment of the results of the elections. Amidst the protests, a riot broke out outside the building of the City Assembly of Belgrade, while Tepić began a hunger strike. The protests lasted up to 30 December; Tepić ended her hunger strike on the same day. The protests received criticism from the Serbian government and Russia. When the National Assembly of Serbia and Assembly of Vojvodina were constituted, the SPN split into several parliamentary groups. The City Assembly of Belgrade, on the other hand, was not constituted because the quorum was not met during its constitutive session. A new Belgrade City Assembly election was then called for 2 June. Whether to participate in the election proved to be a difficult task for the coalition, considering that SSP, SRCE, and Zajedno opposed participation in the election, instead wanting electoral conditions to be improved first. The rest of the coalition decided to form the We Choose Belgrade electoral list. The coalition was effectively dissolved on 23 April. In the 2 June election, the We Choose Belgrade electoral list only won 14 seats. In comparison with SPN, which received 325,000 votes in the 2023 election, BB only won 89,000 votes, partially due to low turnout.

Its former members took different paths in the 2026 Serbian parliamentary election, won by the Student List. NPS, NLS and EU formed the "People's Serbia" coalition, which submitted a list but immediately withdrew it in favour of the Student List, while the DS parliamentary group renamed itself "Deputies with the Students: For Election Control" and offered its places on polling-station committees to the Student List. SSP and SRCE contested the election on the "European Serbia" list, which won around 0.3% of the vote and failed to cross the electoral threshold.

== Ideology and platform ==
SPN was composed of pro-European political parties, commonly known as the civic opposition (građanska opozicija), which were opposed to the ruling Serbian Progressive Party. Shortly after the formation of SPN, The Guardian described it as centrist. During the campaign period, Politico and BBC News saw SPN as a big tent coalition; political scientist Filip Balunović also described SPN as a big tent coalition with left-leaning themes. Journalist Antonela Riha described SPN as a coalition of "pro-European, centrist, and left-wing parties", while Bloomberg News described SPN as a "pro-Western liberal bloc". Saša Dragojlo of Balkan Insight said that SPN is a "liberal, centrist, pro-European" coalition. The European Conservative described SPN as a left-liberal bloc, while France 24 and Reuters described SPN as a centre-left alliance. Alongside its pro-Western sentiment, SPN also been noted for its anti-corruption rhetoric and support for such measures. Tepić has self-described SPN as a pro-European coalition and that SPN has "zero tolerance towards corruption and crime" (nultu toleranciju na korupciju i kriminal) and that it supports the "depoliticisation of the judiciary and the police" (depolitizaciju pravosuđa i policije). SPN supported the formation of a technical government after the 2023 elections, in case of a SPN victory.

Dragan Đilas, the president of SSP, pledged that SPN would return pensions that were lowered by Aleksandar Vučić's government in 2014 to pensioners or the heirs of deceased pensioners. Vučić's government lowered public sector salaries and pensions in 2014 by 10–10.5% due to Serbia's high public debt. Đilas also pledged that SPN would combat corruption, institute professionalism in public institutions, increase salaries, invest in education, and break up monopolies. In an interview with Ljubica Gojgić, Đilas said that "there is not even 'p' from populism" (nema ni "p" od populizma) in his statements, saying that "there is enough money in the budget if some senseless and too expensive projects are abandoned, such as the construction of the national stadium, [...] for the purpose of which around €1,000,000,000 is earmarked" (ima para u budžetu ukoliko se odustane od nekih besmislenih i preskupih projekata, kao što je izgradnja nacionalnog stadiona [...] za čiju namenu je predviđeno oko milijardu evra). Aleksandar Jovanović Ćuta, the leader of EU, said that in his opinion, SPN's primary task would be to "eradicate hunger" (iskorenjivanje gladi).

Lazović said that if SPN had come to power, it would remove national broadcast frequency status for Happy and Pink television channels, lower inflation and prices, and invest in universal health care protection. Aleksić said that SPN would introduce progressive taxation, review the assets of public officials and people affiliated with the government, confiscate illegally acquired property, abolish excise taxes on electricity, and support domestic entrepreneurs and farmers. Zoran Lutovac, the president of DS, also called for the lustration of public officials with ties with to crime. Aleksić, while campaigning in Gračanica, also declared that SPN opposes the Ohrid Agreement and the independence of Kosovo but supports the normalisation of relations between Serbia and Kosovo.

In Belgrade, SPN campaigned on opposing the destruction of the Belgrade Fair complex and the Old Sava Bridge. Veselinović also named "politics without violence and corruption" (politika bez nasilja, korupcije), making sure that there is a place for every child in kindergartens, preserving the city's landscape and environment, and improving Belgrade's traffic as one of their main issues. Obradović said that as mayor of Belgrade, he would "intend to deal specifically with the Belgrade suburbs" (nameravam da se posebno bavim beogradskim predgrađima) and that he would solve traffic problems and invest more in public transport. Besides public transport, Obradović also listed local government reorganisation, transparency, air pollution, public security, and the environment as his key issues. Obradović declared his support for free public transport for students. On behalf of SPN, Veselinović said that the coalition also supported expanding tram lines, optimising bus and tram networks, expanding the BG Voz system to Pančevo and Stara Pazova, and opposing the widening of car lanes.

SPN received international support from the Alliance of Liberals and Democrats for Europe and the European Greens.

== Members ==
At the time of its formation, SPN had DS, SSP, Together, ZLF, NPS, PSG, EU, and SRCE as its members, including minor parties and organisations such as Movement for Reversal, United Trade Unions of Serbia "Sloga", and Fatherland, which were all SSP-affiliated members, and New Face of Serbia (NLS), affiliated with NPS. On 3 November, the Civic Democratic Party and Romanian Party became members of SPN. The Action of Progressive Vojvodina also filed several of its candidates for the Vojvodina provincial election.

After negotiations with NPS, the Social Democratic Party, led by former president of Serbia Boris Tadić, announced on 2 November that it would contest the elections with SPN. However, NPS ultimately declined SDS joining SPN, with Aleksić stating that SDS "answered too late" (prekasno odgovorili). Aleksić later said that he was in favour of SDS being on the SPN electoral list, however that "within [SPN] there were different views" (bilo različitih stavova) which resulted "that one part of SDS becomes part of 'Serbia Against Violence', but that the party forms another coalition" (što je na kraju rezultiralo da jedan deo SDS-a bude deo 'Srbije protiv nasilja', a da stranka pravi, ipak, drugu koaliciju). Aleksandar Ivanović and Goran Radosavljević switched their affiliations from SDS to Aleksić's NPS and SDS later formed a coalition with Enough is Enough and Stolen Babies for the 2023 elections.

Name	Leader(s)	Main ideology	Political position	National Assembly	Assembly of Vojvodina	City Assembly of Belgrade
Party of Freedom and Justice (SSP)	Dragan Đilas	Social democracy	Centre-left	15 / 250	9 / 120	8 / 110
People's Movement of Serbia (NPS)	Miroslav Aleksić	Anti-corruption	Centre-right	12 / 250	5 / 120	5 / 110
Green–Left Front (ZLF)	Radomir Lazović, Biljana Đorđević	Green politics	Left-wing	10 / 250	3 / 120	14 / 110
Serbia Centre (SRCE)	Zdravko Ponoš	Centre		9 / 250	4 / 120	4 / 110
Democratic Party (DS)	Zoran Lutovac	Social democracy	Centre-left	8 / 250	2 / 120	2 / 110
Ecological Uprising (EU)	Aleksandar Jovanović Ćuta	Green politics		5 / 250	2 / 120	2 / 110
Movement of Free Citizens (PSG) (Note: PSG members were on the quota of GDP in the 2023 elections. GDP merged into PSG in March 2024, after which PSG became a political party.)	Pavle Grbović	Liberalism	Centre	3 / 250	2 / 120	3 / 110
New Face of Serbia (NLS)	Miloš Parandilović	Conservatism	Centre-right	2 / 250	0 / 120	1 / 110
United Trade Unions of Serbia "Sloga" (USS Sloga)	Željko Veselinović	Labourism	Left-wing	1 / 250	0 / 120	1 / 110
Together (Zajedno)	Biljana Stojković, Nebojša Zelenović	Green politics	Left-wing	0 / 250	2 / 120	2 / 110
Movement for Reversal (PZP)	Janko Veselinović	Social democracy	Centre-left	0 / 250	1 / 120	1 / 110
Fatherland	Slaviša Ristić	Kosovo Serb minority interests		0 / 250	0 / 120	0 / 110
Civic Democratic Party (GDP)	Miroslav Ilić	Vojvodina autonomism	Left-wing	0 / 250	0 / 120	0 / 110
Romanian Party (PR/RP)	Ion Sfera	Romanian minority interests		0 / 250	0 / 120	0 / 110
Action of Progressive Vojvodina (APV)	Collective leadership	Democratic socialism	Left-wing	0 / 250	0 / 120	0 / 110

== Electoral performance ==
=== Parliamentary elections ===
National Assembly
Year	Leader		Popular vote	% of popular vote	#	# of seats	Seat change	Status	Ref.
Year	Name	Party	Popular vote	% of popular vote	#	# of seats	Seat change	Status	Ref.
2023	Marinika Tepić	SSP	902,450	24.32%	▲2nd	65 / 250	▲25	Opposition	

=== Provincial elections ===
Assembly of Vojvodina
Year	Leader		Popular vote	% of popular vote	#	# of seats	Seat change	Status	Ref.
Year	Name	Party	Popular vote	% of popular vote	#	# of seats	Seat change	Status	Ref.
2023	Stanko Pužić	NPS	215,197	22.55%	2nd	30 / 120	▲30	Opposition	

=== Belgrade City Assembly elections ===
City Assembly of Belgrade
Year	Leader		Popular vote	% of popular vote	#	# of seats	Seat change	Status	Ref.
Year	Name	Party	Popular vote	% of popular vote	#	# of seats	Seat change	Status	Ref.
2023	Vladimir Obradović	Ind.	325,429	35.39%	2nd	43 / 110	▲8	Snap election	

== See also ==
- Alliance for Serbia
- Democratic Opposition of Serbia
- United Opposition of Serbia
