= Aleksandar Jovanović Ćuta =

Serbian environmental activist

Aleksandar Jovanović
- Александар Јовановић
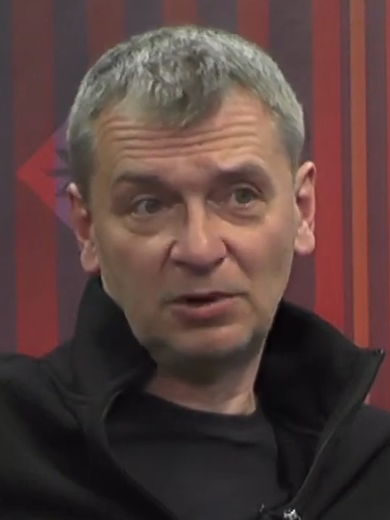
- Jovanović in 2022

Member of the National Assembly
- Incumbent
- Assumed office 1 August 2022

Personal details
- Born: 30 September 1966 (age 60) Belgrade, SFR Yugoslavia
- Party: EU (2021–2022; 2023–present); Together (2022–2023)
- Children: 2
- Occupation: Environmental activist
- Nickname: Ćuta
- Other offices: 2022–2023: Deputy President of the Together–We Must parliamentary group

Aleksandar Jovanović (Serbian Cyrillic: Александар Јовановић; born 30 September 1966), commonly known by his nickname Ćuta, is a Serbian environmental and political activist who has been a member of the National Assembly of Serbia since August 2022.

Born in Belgrade, Jovanović often stayed at Stara Planina, a mountain in Eastern Serbia, and was interested in rock music, football, and chess during his youth. He founded the Defend the Rivers of Stara Planina organisation in 2017, which primarily concentrated on combating the construction of small hydros in the Stara Planina region, although over time, Jovanović shifted his presence over other regions of Serbia. He gained recognition in the media and has been noted as one of the representatives of environmental activism in Serbia. Jovanović has organised environmental protests and gatherings around Serbia and managed to stop the construction of several projects.

Jovanović was the organiser of the Ecological Uprising protests, which set off the 2021–2022 environmental protests, in which he played a key role. He led the Ecological Uprising movement and cooperated with opposition politicians Nebojša Zelenović and Radomir Lazović, ultimately forming the We Must (Moramo) electoral alliance with them for the 2022 general election. He appeared first on its electoral list and was successfully elected to the National Assembly of Serbia. He was one of the co-presidents of the Together political party from 2022 until his resignation in 2023.

== Early life ==
Aleksandar Jovanović was born on 30 September 1966 in Belgrade, SR Serbia, SFR Yugoslavia. He grew up in the Žarkovo neighbourhood of Belgrade, and attended a primary school in Košutnjak and Banovo Brdo. He later attended the Faculty of Dramatic Arts at the University of Arts in Belgrade.

As a youth, Jovanović regularly stayed at Stara Planina where his grandparents lived. In his youth he showed interest in rock music and learned to play guitar. He also plays football and chess. Jovanović is often referred to by a nickname Ćuta.

== Career ==
=== 2016–2020 ===
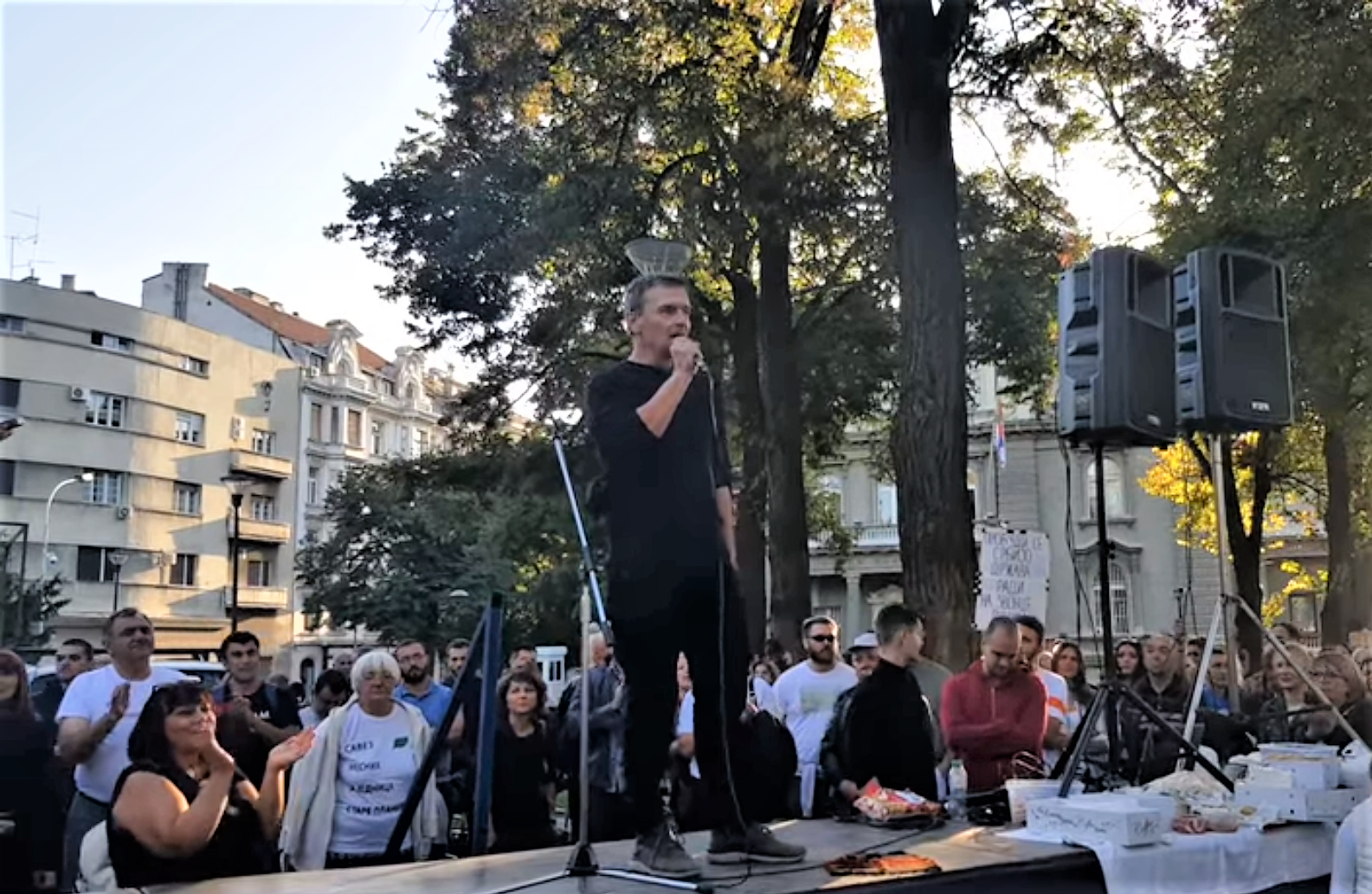
Jovanović giving a speech during a protest in September 2019

His activist career began in 2016, and a year later, he founded the organisation Defend the Rivers of Stara Planina, to combat the construction of small hydroelectric power plants in the Stara Planina region. Since then, he has been a notable representative of the group of activists that opposes the construction of small hydros. Over the course of his activist career, he managed to stop the construction of several small hydros across Serbia.

In early 2018, Jovanović and other members of his organisation formed a Facebook group, which quickly gained popularity. Due to his activism, in June 2018, the government of Serbia decided to send a thank-you note to Ćuta, although he ended up refusing to receive the note. He has criticised the Serbian government for its approach to environmental protection. In September 2018, he organised mass protests in Pirot; the protests were participated by a couple of thousand demonstrators, with a demand to prohibit the construction of small hydros. He and his organisation managed to send a case regarding the construction of a small hydro on the Visočica river to the Supreme Court of Cassation, which ended up prohibiting the construction of a small hydro in November 2018.

Over the course of 2019, he organised environmental protests across cities in Serbia, initially beginning in January. Another series of protests were held in April. A month later, he and other activists from his organisation were fined by the Misdemeanor Court after they cleaned the riverbed of the river in Rakita, and later that month they organised protests in front of the UniCredit headquarters in Belgrade. Two months later, they called for the government to react regarding the small hydro in Rakita. Jovanović organised protests in Belgrade on 21 September, and a week later, environmental activists held talks with Serbian president Aleksandar Vučić, during which he demanded for the total prohibition of constructing small hydros across Serbia; Vučić rejected his demand. He took part in The Weight of Chains 3 documentary film.

Jovanović called for protests to be held in June 2020, after accusing the government of not respecting environmental protection regulations. Activists, politicians, and scientists participated in the protests. He gave a speech during the protests and announced the removal of pipes from the bed of the Rakita river. In August, the government decided to invoke a ban of constructing small hydros in the Stara Planina region, and during mid-August, a group of citizens, led by him, managed to break two pipes, which disabled the pipeline in the river. The event gained national media coverage. Later that month, another protest was organised by Jovanović and Savo Manojlović, the general director of Kreni-Promeni. In November, Jovanović and other activists requested a talk to be held between them and the Anglo-Australian multinational company Rio Tinto, to discuss about the Project Jadar, although the talk ended up being cancelled.

=== 2021–present ===
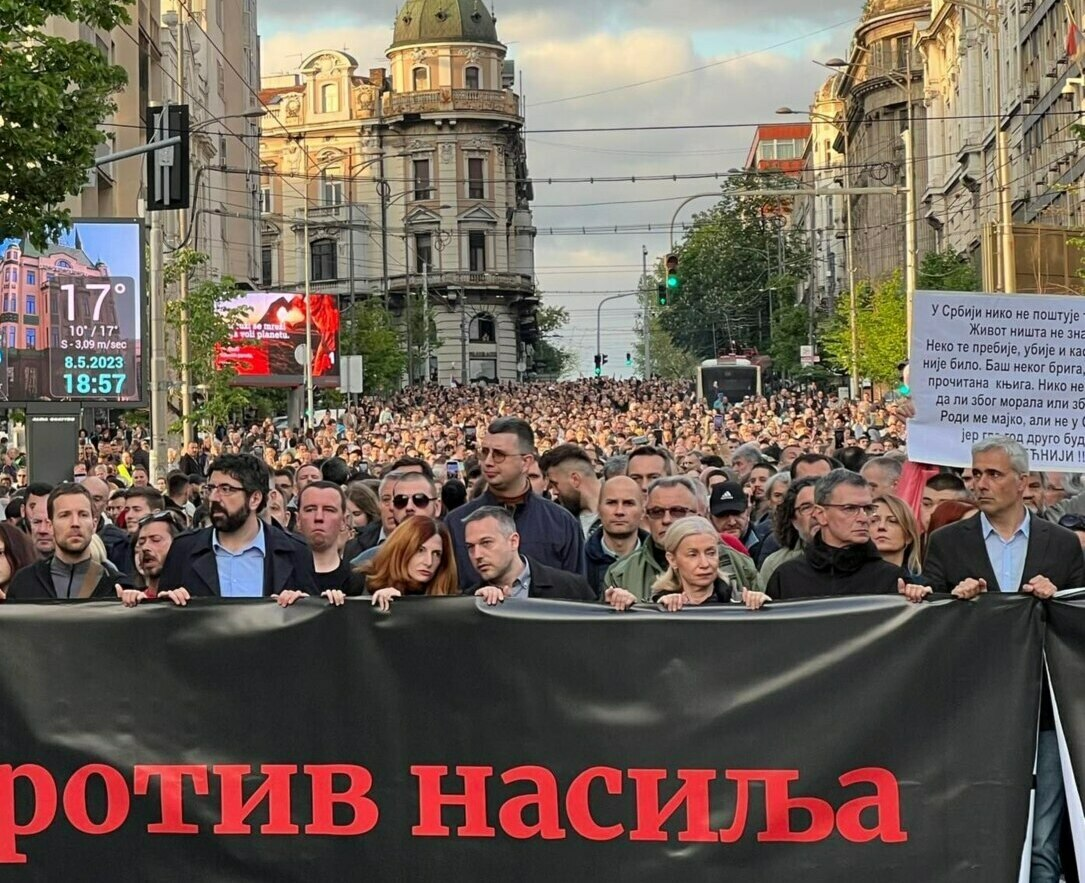
Jovanović (right) at the 2023 protests

Protests which were dubbed as "Protests for Harmless Air", were organised in early January 2021. Jovanović, as a representative of his Defend the Rivers of Stara Planina organisation, participated in the protests and gave a speech criticising Rio Tinto and Linglong Tire, a Chinese tire manufacturing enterprise. During the protest, he stated that "air, water, and our country are non-negotiable". He was invited to the Utisak nedelje, a Serbian political talk show, on 7 March, where he expressed his pro-conservation views, and stated that "environmental activists in Serbia are labelled as enemies of the state". Two days after the show, he was detained by the police, and was released shortly after. Later that month, he said that he would organise an Ecological Uprising protest on 10 April. The request gained attention, and around 60 environmental organisations participated in the protests. Thousands of demonstrators gathered in front of the House of the National Assembly, and Jovanović demanded the government to suspend all projects harmful to the environment, as well as to adapt regulations to the highest environmental standards. Following the April protests, which he deemed to be successful, he stated that he would form an environmental movement, and that it would cooperate with other green movements in Serbia. During May, he and other environmental activists organised gatherings and protests at the Reva bog, which is located next to Krnjača. In June, he confirmed his ambition to form a movement, and stated that he would be ready to cooperate with a fellow opposition politician Nebojša Zelenović and the Do not let Belgrade drown (NDB) movement.

In August 2021, Jovanović and his newly formed Ecological Uprising (EU) organisation announced that a protest would be held on 11 September. That protest marked the beginning of the 2021–2022 environmental protests, which were held until February 2022. He played a key role in the protests. During the protests, he received criticism from government officials, while the pro-government media spread attacked his career and views. His demands were mainly centred around Rio Tinto. In November, he called for the radicalisation of the protests, which led to roadblocks being organised across Serbia in late November and early December. During that period, he discussed with Zelenović and Radomir Lazović from NDB about the creation of a coalition. He then signed a coalition agreement with Zelenović's Together for Serbia (ZZS) party, and announced his participation in the 2022 general election. The coalition was formalised in January 2022, under the name We Must. Jovanović appeared first on the We Must ballot list. The coalition won around 5% of the popular vote and 13 seats in the National Assembly; he won his seat and became a member of the National Assembly.

In May 2021, he announced the merger of Action, led by Zelenović, Ecological Uprising, and Assembly of Free Serbia into a joint left-wing political party, which occurred on 11 June. Together with Biljana Stojković and Zelenović, he became one of the co-leaders of the party, named Together (Zajedno). After being sworn in as a member of the National Assembly on 1 August 2022, he was assigned head of the committee for environmental protection and a member of the committee for culture and information. He has continued his environmental activism even after being elected member of the National Assembly. He took part at the protests at Savski Nasip in March 2023 and the Serbia Against Violence protests which began in May 2023. Due to internal disagreements inside Together, Ćuta and other members of EU left the party in September 2023. Jovanović and his organisation took part in the 2023 election as part of the Serbia Against Violence coalition. He was successfully re-elected to the National Assembly. Once the 14th National Assembly of Serbia was constituted in February 2024, he became the parliamentary leader of his organisation.

== Political positions ==
He is opposed to lithium mining. While responding to issues regarding spilling sulfuric acid into rivers, he has said that "I would brutally punish anyone who poisons the air and the land".

Jovanović supports the accession of Serbia to the European Union but is opposed to sanctioning Russia due to the Russian invasion of Ukraine. He is a critic of the approach of the Serbian government towards Kosovo. He is particularly opposed to the recognition of Kosovo, saying that "for those who do not know whose Kosovo is, look at the Serbian Constitution". Jovanović has also criticised the treatment of Albanians on pro-government television channels, saying that "on Pink and Happy you will not see good Albanians, because on those televisions all Albanians are portrayed as Serb-haters and shiptars".

While being asked whether he supported holding the 2022 Belgrade EuroPride, he has said that he supports "equal rights for all citizens, regardless of our differences". In 2023, Jovanović stated his opposition to same-sex marriages, adding that "not even the whole EU has legalised it". He has, however, stated his support for the LGBT+ population.

The Party of Freedom and Justice political party criticised Jovanović in 2021 due to the alleged claim that he participated in the formation of the Serbian Progressive Party (SNS), something that he had denied doing. During an interview for Vreme, Jovanović stated that he "was offered to create a green party that would cooperate with SNS", although he rejected the offer.

== Personal life ==
He resides in Belgrade, is divorced and has two children. He was twice married, once of which to a journalist.
