= Zajedno =

Zajedno (English: Together) may refer to:

- Together (Serbia) (Zajedno), a political party in Serbia
- Together for Serbia (Zajedno za Srbiju), a defunct political party in Serbia
- Coalition Together (Zajedno), a defunct political alliance in Serbia
