= 2021–2022 Serbian environmental protests =

Protests in Serbia

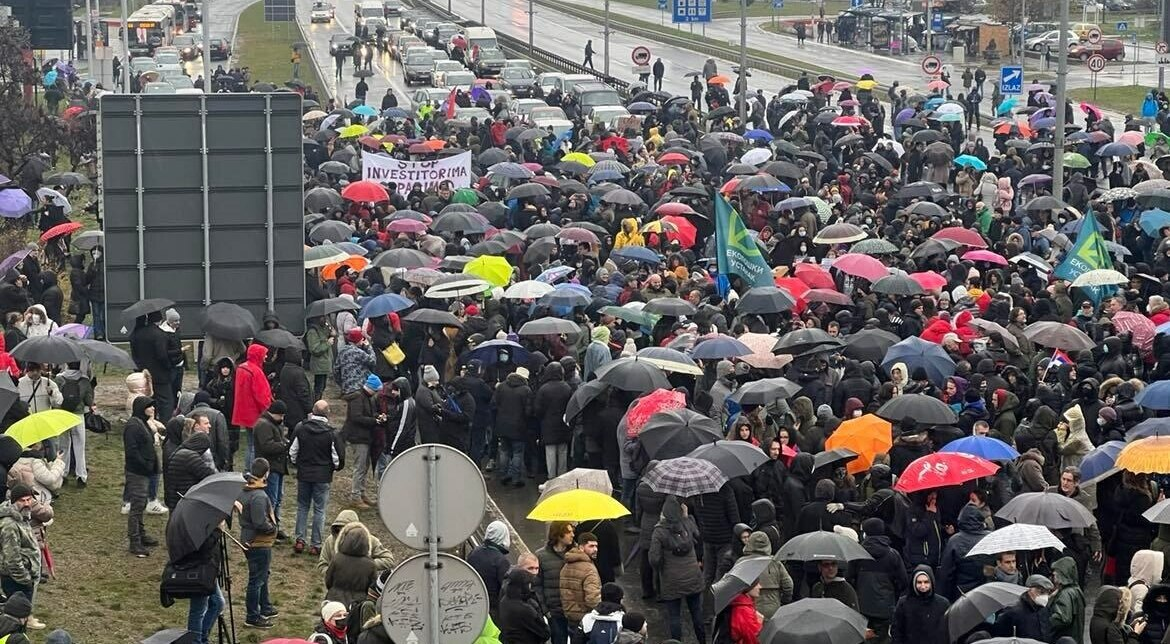
- Protesters blocking the Gazela Bridge on 11 December 2021
- Date: 11 September 2021 – 15 February 2022 (5 months and 4 days)
- Location: Serbia (with diaspora protests)
- Caused by: Rio Tinto's lithium mine investment; Modification of the Expropriation Law; Modification of the Law on Referendum
- Goals: Rejection of Rio Tinto's investment; Release of arrested protesters; Withdrawal of changes to the expropriation and referendum laws; Moratorium on the exploration and exploitation of boron and lithium
- Methods: Demonstrations, civil roadblocks, civil resistance
- Concessions: Expropriation law withdrawn; Referendum law amended; Abolishment of the spatial plan for Rio Tinto's lithium mine investment; All administrative acts related to Rio Tinto annulled

Parties
Anti-government protesters: Citizens; Environmental activists; Ecological Uprising; Kreni-Promeni (Note: Kreni Promeni and Savo Manojlović abstained from protests from 11 December 2021 to 18 January 2022); SEOS; Eco Guard; Opposition parties: Assembly of Free Serbia; Together for Serbia; Do not let Belgrade drown; Party of Freedom and Justice; People's Party; Democratic Party; Movement of Free Citizens	Government of Serbia: Police of Serbia; Pro-government activists; Government parties: Serbian Progressive Party

Lead figures
Aleksandar Jovanović Ćuta; Savo Manojlović	Aleksandar Vučić; Ana Brnabić

In September 2021, a series of environmental protests began in Belgrade and other locations in Serbia. Protesters demanded the rejection of Rio Tinto's mine investment and the withdrawal of proposed changes to the Expropriation and Referendum Laws.

Anglo-Australian corporation Rio Tinto discovered jadarite, a mineral that has high concentration of lithium, in the Jadar Valley in 2004. Rio Tinto was given permission in 2017 by the government of Serbia to open a mine from which lithium would be extracted. Rio Tinto's project received criticism from environmental activists and academics, stating the possibility that the project could pollute the nearby environment. Amidst the protests, changes to the Expropriation Law and Law on Referendum were proposed in the National Assembly of Serbia. Organisations, activists, and politicians alleged that the laws were connected to Rio Tinto. The changes to the Law on Referendum were withdrawn in December 2021. In the same month, Rio Tinto's spatial plan was abolished.

The government of Serbia annulled all contracts with Rio Tinto in January 2022, however the protests continued up until the dissolution of the National Assembly on 15 February, (Note: The dissolution of the National Assembly occurred because the 2022 Serbian parliamentary election was a snap election.) during which demands for introducing a moratorium on exploitation of lithium increased. Organisations like Ecological Uprising, Alliance of Environmental Organisations of Serbia, and Kreni-Promeni were the ones who organised roadblock protests, at which clashes occurred. In an opinion poll that was conducted during the protests, a majority of the public were supportive of the protests.

== Background ==
=== Jadarite and Project Jadar ===
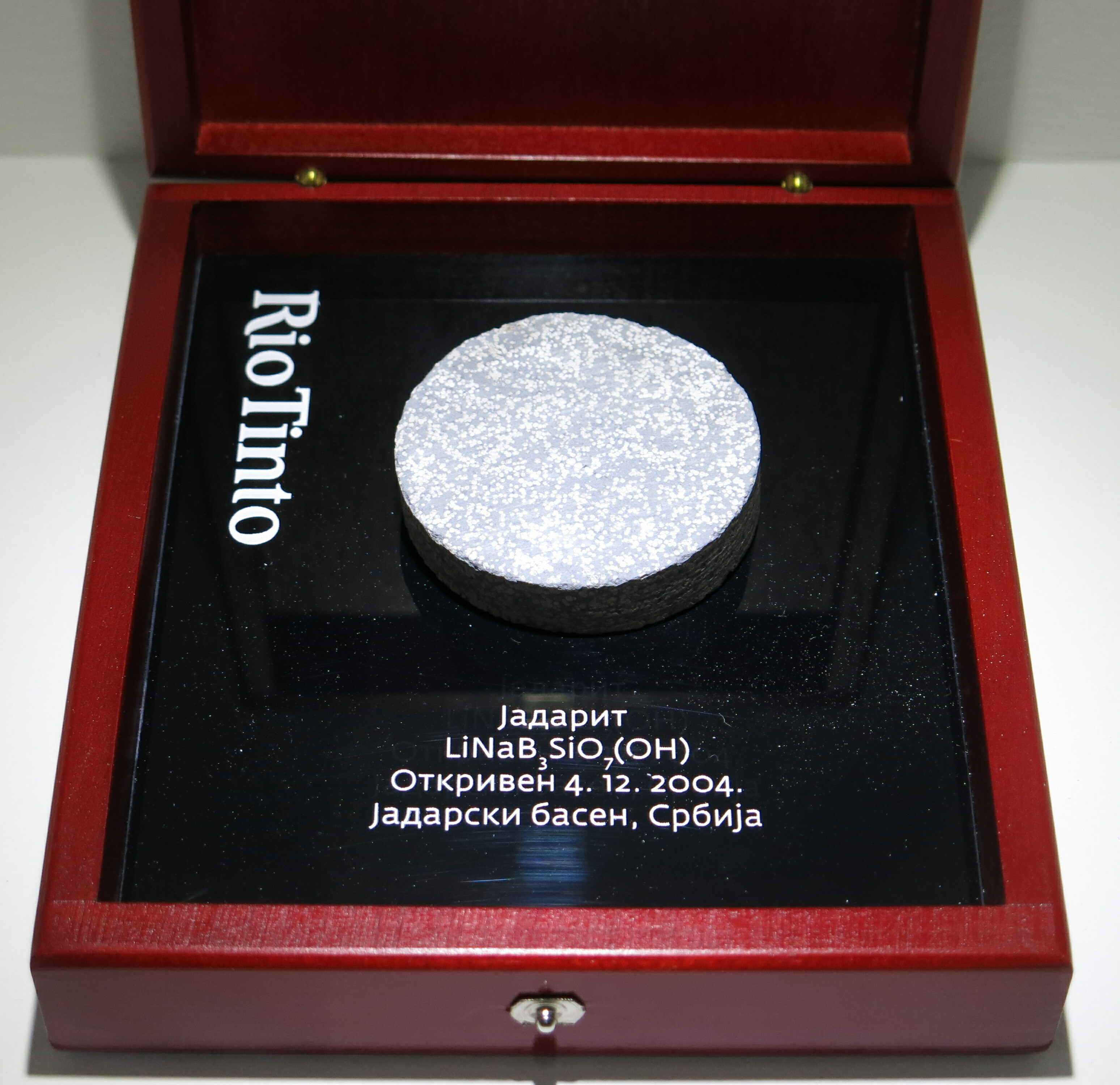
The jadarite mineral, which contains lithium and boron, was discovered by Rio Tinto in 2004

In June 2004 Vojislav Koštunica's administration gave Rio Tinto's sister company, Rio Sava Exploration, permission to perform geological research. In December 2004, Anglo-Australian mining corporation Rio Tinto discovered the silicate mineral jadarite in a mine in the Jadar Valley. Rio Tinto's boundaries of exploration were later further extended by the Democratic Party-led government and Serbian Progressive Party-led governments. Until 2017, Rio Tinto did not have the permit to build a jadarite mine from which lithium would be extracted.

The International Mineralogical Association recognised jadarite as a mineral in November 2006. Due to the high concentration of lithium in jadarite, the Jadar Valley has been described as an important lithium deposit. In 2017, the government of Serbia signed a memorandum with Rio Tinto to implement Project Jadar, a project that would allow Rio Tinto to open a jadarite mine from which lithium and boron would be extracted. The mine was set to open in 2023 and production of lithium batteries was set to begin in 2027. Aleksandar Antić, who was then the minister of mining and energy, said that the project "will make Serbia a key processor of two very important elements–lithium and boron–which are essential for modern development". (Note: Serbian: Učiniće Srbiju ključnim prerađivačem dva veoma važna elementa – litijuma i bora – koji su bitni za savremeni razvoj.)

In an interview for the newspaper Danas in 2020, Miroslav Mijatović, the head of the Podrinje Anti-Corruption Team, said that local communities and environmental activists have opposed the implementation of Project Jadar. "For the needs of the mine, it is necessary to draw large amounts of water, which could lead to droughts during the summer and floods during the rainy periods", Mijatović said. (Note: Serbian: Za potrebe rudnika je potrebno crpiti velike količine vode zbog čega bi tokom leta moglo da dođe do suše a tokom kišnih perioda do poplava.) Ana Brnabić, the prime minister of Serbia, has described the project as of "exceptional importance" in late 2020 while Rio Tinto said that its technology "will be at service of the environment". (Note: Serbian: izuzetnog značaja, and Serbian: biće u službi životne sredine)

=== Related protests ===
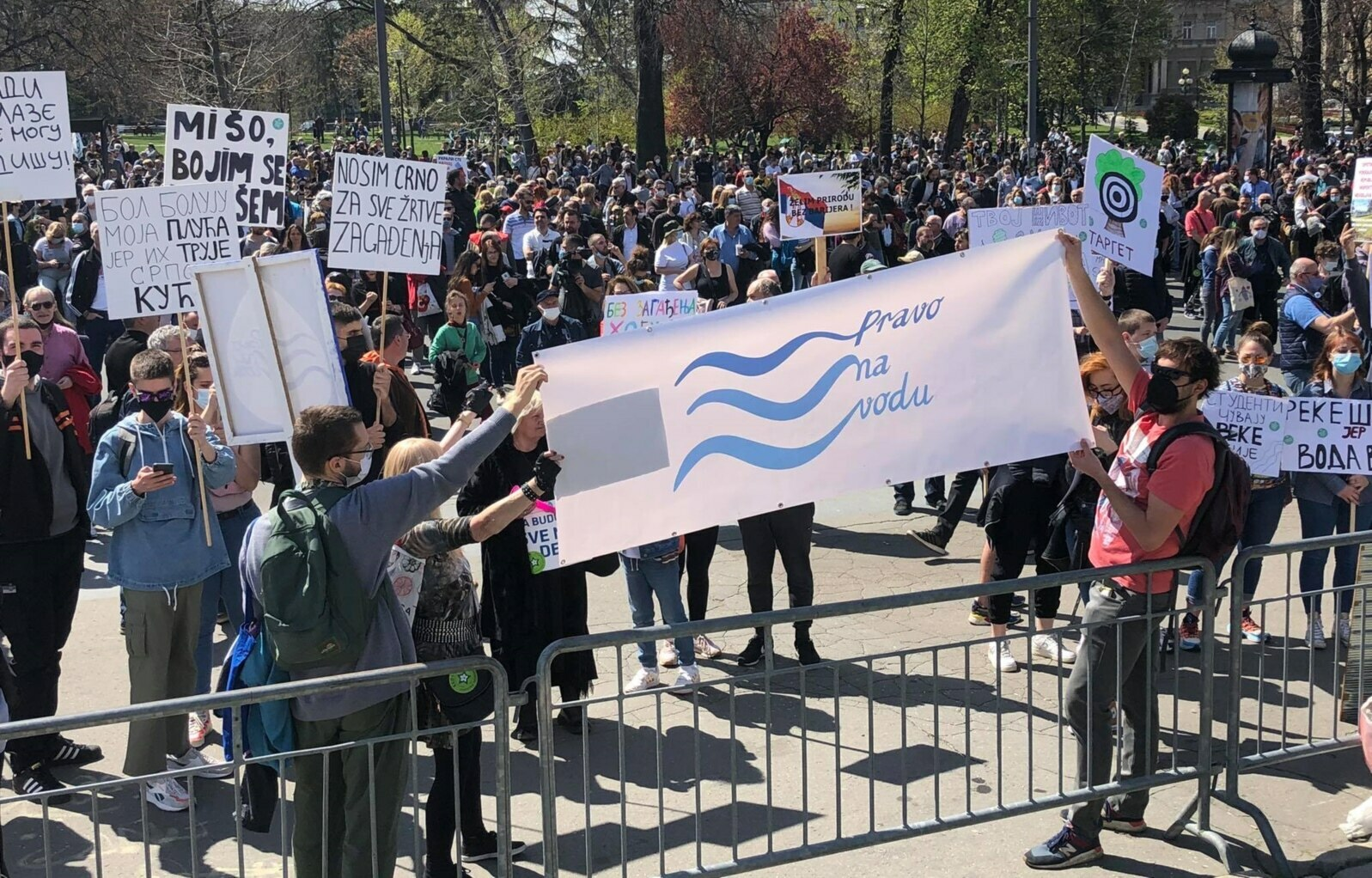
Demonstrators at the Ecological Uprising protest

In Serbia, environmental protests had been organised as early as in 2019. In January 2021, the Eco Guard initiative organised a protest in Belgrade, dubbed "Protest for Harmless Air", (Note: Serbian: Protest za bezopasan vazduh.) which was attended by between 2,000 and 3,000 demonstrators. Also in attendance was Aleksandar Jovanović Ćuta, an environmental activist who gained prominence in 2018 due to his opposition to small hydros.

Two months later, Ćuta and his Defend the Rivers of Stara Planina organisation organised a protest in front of the National Assembly of Serbia, which he called the "Ecological Uprising". (Note: Serbian: Ekološki ustanak.) It was attended by several thousand demonstrators and 45 environmental organisations, who demanded the suspension of all projects that were harmful to the environment, including Rio Tinto's Project Jadar. In response to the protests, Brnabić criticised the attendees for not complying with measures to curb COVID-19 but affirmed that she would discuss their demands.

=== November 2021 laws ===
While the environmental protests were still ongoing, the National Assembly discussed the proposed changes to the Expropriation Law and Law on Referendum and People's Initiative. Although the Expropriation Law only allows private property to be seized "if it is in the public interest determined on the basis of law", (Note: Serbian: U javnom interesu utvrđenom na osnovu zakona.) the introduced changes would expand the definition of "public interest" to include projects implemented by private companies. Regarding the changes that were proposed to the Law on Referendum, the 51% turnout required for a referendum to be considered valid would be abolished.

== Timeline ==
=== 2021 ===
==== 11 September ====
Before the protests on 11 September, Ćuta already formalised Ecological Uprising as a banner for several environmental organisations, which included his Defend the Rivers of Stara Planina organisation. The Ecological Uprising protest on 11 September was organised in Pioneers Park, Belgrade, in front of Novi dvor, the seat of president of Serbia. After the speeches in Pioneers Park, demonstrators roadblocked Branko's Bridge for two hours. The protest received support from opposition parties and organisations like the Democratic Party, Party of Freedom and Justice, People's Party, Together for Serbia, and Do not let Belgrade drown.

==== 6 and 19 November ====
The day before the 6 November protest, whistleblowers released to the draft plan of the Project Jadar facility to be built in Gornje Nedeljice, a village in the Loznica municipality. The Radio Television of Serbia also aired an advertisement that promoted Rio Tinto; the Regulatory Body for Electronic Media stated that the advertisement was aired in accordance with legal regulations. Despite this, 30 civil society organisations and individuals submitted a request to ban the advertisement, claiming it violated the Law on Advertisements.

Environmental organisations, led by Ćuta's Ecological Uprising, organised a protest in front of Radio Television of Serbia on 6 November. The protest on 6 November was attended by several hundred demonstrators. Kreni-Promeni, a non-governmental organisation, organised another protest in front of the Radio Television of Serbia building on 19 November in response to Radio Television of Serbia declining to air an anti-Rio Tinto advertisement.

==== 22–24 November ====
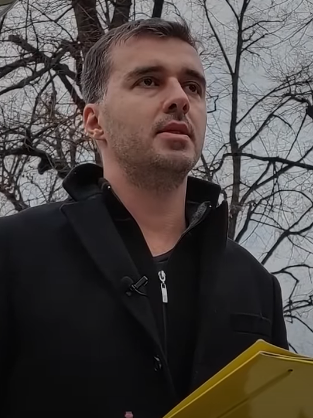
Savo Manojlović, the spokesperson of Kreni-Promeni

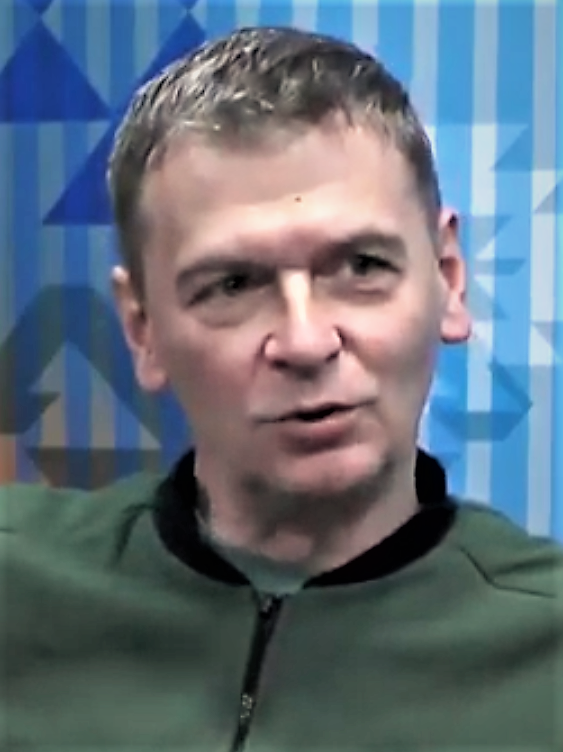
Aleksandar Jovanović Ćuta, the founder of the Ecological Uprising

Ecological Uprising organised a protest in Makiš, Belgrade on 22 November, the same day the construction of the Belgrade Metro began. Ecological Uprising claimed that the construction of the metro in Makiš would "lead to the complete destruction of Belgrade's largest water supply". (Note: Serbian: dovede do potpunog uništenja najvećeg beogradskog vodoizvorišta.) The protest was also attended by Party of Freedom and Justice, People's Party, and Movement of Free Citizens politicians.

On 23 November, while the National Assembly discussed the changes of the Expropriation Law and Law on Referendum, the Assembly of Free Serbia organisation held a protest in front of its building. Assembly of Free Serbia and environmental organisations emphasised that both laws "are not only related to projects of Rio Tinto and other mining companies, but also to all existing and future agreements". (Note: Serbian: Ovi zakoni nisu povezani isključivo sa projektima Rio Tinto i drugih rudarskih kompanija, već i sa svim postojećim i budućim dogovorima.)

A day later, Savo Manojlović, spokesperson for Kreni-Promeni, announced that several civil society organisations had sent a petition to the National Assembly with 68,000 signatories who opposed the Law on Referendum. On the same day, an environmental protest was organised in front of Novi dvor as response to the National Assembly discussing the two laws. Thousands of demonstrators attended the 24 November protest.

==== 27–29 November ====
Protests and roadblocks on 27 November were held at multiple locations in Serbia and were attended by thousands of demonstrators. In Belgrade, the Gazela Bridge and Mostar interchange were roadblocked by demonstrators, while in Novi Sad several demonstrators were detained. It was also reported that clashes between the police and demonstrators occurred. Assembly of Free Serbia, Democratic Party, People's Party, and Do not let Belgrade drown demanded the release of those who were detained during the protests.

In Šabac, protests became violent when a group of masked men attacked a group of demonstrators. The masked men used batons to force demonstrators to open the roads for buses carrying supporters of President Aleksandar Vučić to a Serbian Progressive Party rally in Belgrade. There was also a group of men who rode tractors and bulldozers towards the demonstrators; one demonstrator that stopped a bulldozer was then detained for two days. A gathering in Šabac in support of Serbian Progressive Party was organised on 29 November. At the gathering, two observers were assaulted and one photographer's equipment was stolen.

Three more environmental protests were organised in the following days; two in Belgrade on 28 November and one in Loznica on 29 November.

==== 4 December ====
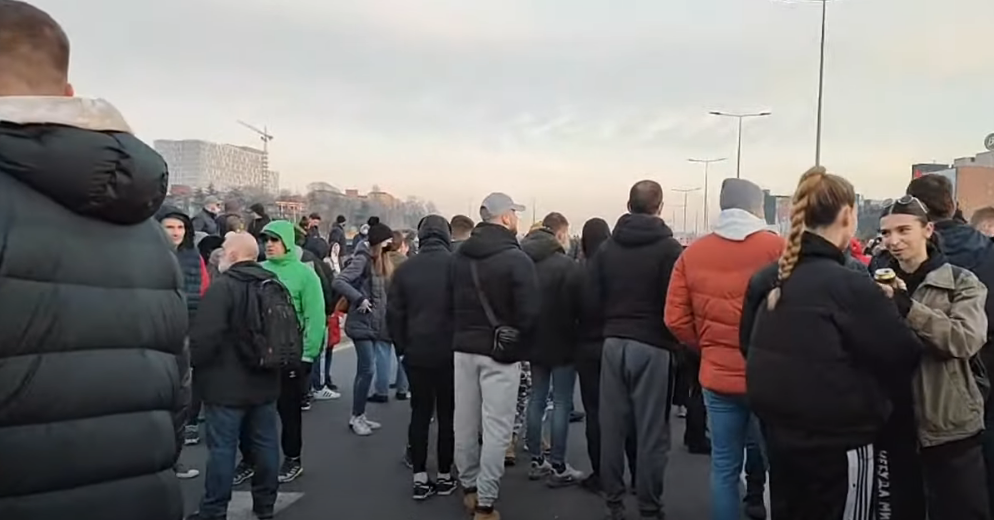
Protests on the Gazela Bridge on 4 December 2021

A day before the 4 December protest, Ecological Uprising announced that roads at over fifty locations would be blocked. In Belgrade, the Gazela Bridge was roadblocked by several thousand demonstrators and a group of masked men threw torches on demonstrators. In Novi Sad, there were clashes between demonstrators and a group of masked men. Gatherings in support of the environmental protests were organised in New York City, Berlin, Paris, and London on the same day.

During the protests, Vučić was present in Gornje Nedeljice, where he gave a press conference and announced that the changes to the Expropriation Law would be amended. Together for Serbia and Ecological Uprising proclaimed the 4 December protests as a "great victory for the citizens". (Note: Serbian: velika pobeda građana) Vučić claimed that 31,000 demonstrators took part in the protests while Nebojša Zelenović, the president of Together for Serbia, claimed that around 110,000 demonstrators attended the protests.

A day after the protests, Manojlović and Zelenović had a polemic during the Utisak nedelje talk show. Zelenović expressed his support for expanding demands while Manojlović disagreed with him, claiming that "the story would be diluted". (Note: Serbian: priča bi se razvodnjavala.) Manojlović's Kreni-Promeni eventually stated that they would not organise roadblocks in the further period, claiming that "citizens' demands were met". (Note: Serbian: zahtevi građana su ispunjeni.)

==== 11–14 December ====
The 11 December protests were held at fifty locations in Serbia. Thousands of demonstrators took part in the protests at which Ćuta affirmed that "there will be no peace until exploitation of lithium is banned and Rio Tinto sent away from Serbia". Sporadic physical and verbal incidents occurred in Belgrade and Niš. On 12 December, a protest was organised in Zrenjanin and on 14 December a few hundred secondary-school students protested against Rio Tinto in Čačak.

==== 16–18 and December ====
The Alliance of Environmental Organisations of Serbia organised a protest in Jagodina on 16 December in opposition to the creation of a lithium mine in the Morava Valley. On 18 December, Ecological Uprising organised a protest in front of the building of the government of Serbia. On the same day, protests were also held in Gornji Milanovac, Užice, and in villages of the Zrenjanin municipality.

==== 24–25 December ====
A group of high-school students organised another protest in opposition to Rio Tinto on 24 December. A day later, Together for Serbia and environmental organisations organised a protest in Šabac, and Ecological Uprising organised in Laznica, a village located near Žagubica.

=== 2022 ===
==== 3 January ====
On 3 January protests were organised by Alliance of Environmental Organisations of Serbia, Assembly of Free Serbia, and Ecological Uprising. Demonstrators roadblocked at eight locations in Serbia while a protest in London, in front of the Rio Tinto building, was also organised. In Preljina, an attendee was injured after being hit by a car.

==== 8–12 January ====
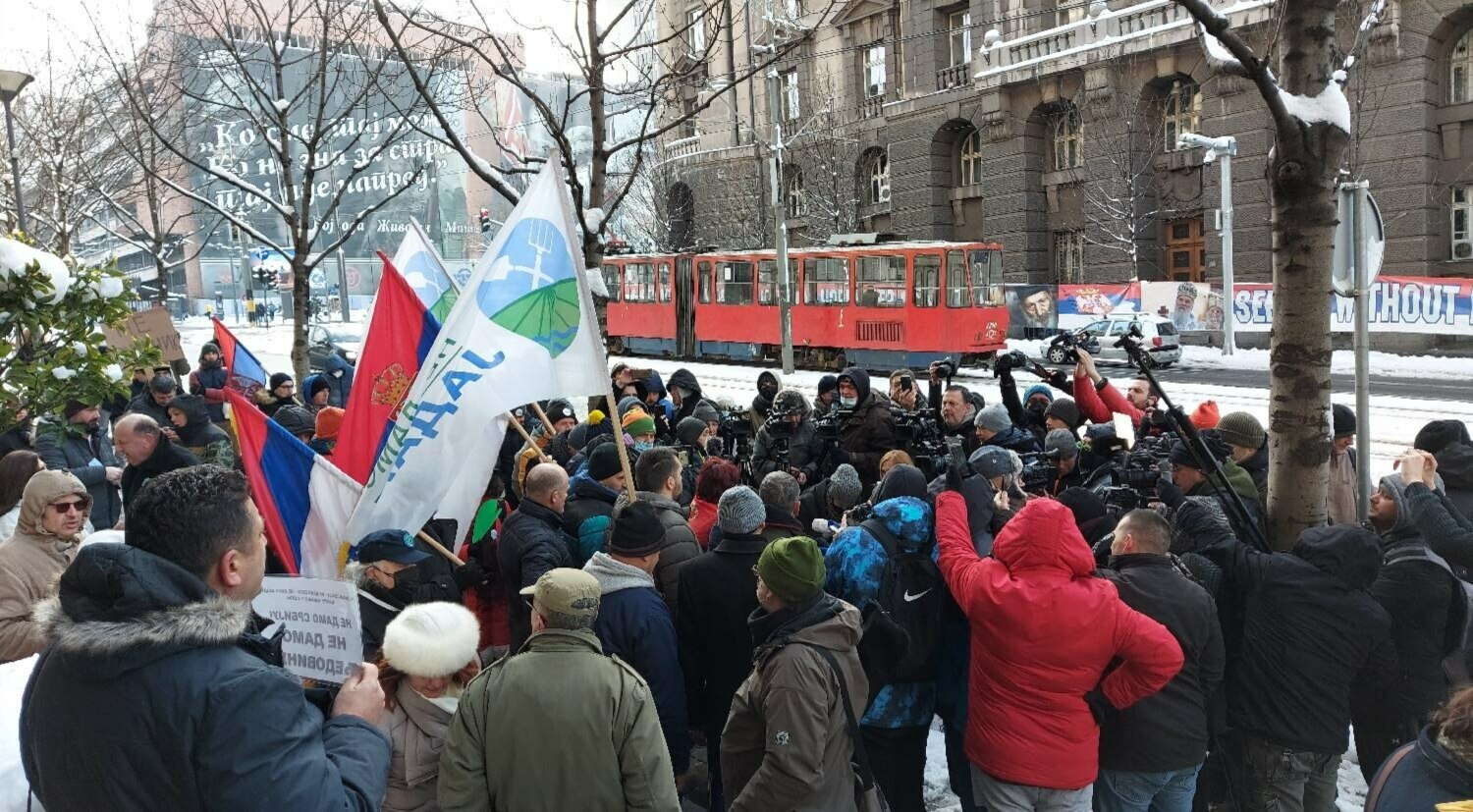
Organisers holding a press conference in front of the government of Serbia on 12 January

On 8 January protests were organised at seven locations in Serbia. In Belgrade and Novi Sad, several verbal and physical incidents occurred. A day later, environmental groups organised a protest in Gornji Milanovac.

In Loznica, activists from the We Won't Give Jadar association threw eggs at the Rio Tinto Info Centre building; one activist was detained. Alliance of Environmental Organisations of Serbia and Ecological Uprising organised another protest on 12 January in front of the building of the government of Serbia. They demanded that the government should publish all Rio Tinto-related documents to the public.

==== 15–16 January ====
On 15 January further protests were held at eleven locations, and in Belgrade and Preljina, there were unsuccessful attempts to drive through crowds of demonstrators. In Šabac however, one attendee was run over by a car. A day later, a group of Serbians in Brussels protested in support of the environmental protests.

==== 18–22 January ====
On 14 February, Manojlović sent over 290,000 signatures of an initiative that sought to prohibit lithium exploitation. Four days later, Manojlović and Kreni-Promeni organised a press conference in front of the National Assembly where they announced that the initiative was rejected. Manojlović subsequently announced a protest for 20 January, which was held in front of Novi dvor. Manojlović demanded the government introduce a moratorium banning lithium and boron mining for the next 20 years. Ecological Uprising organised another environmental protest on 22 January in Loznica.

==== 27 January – 3 February ====
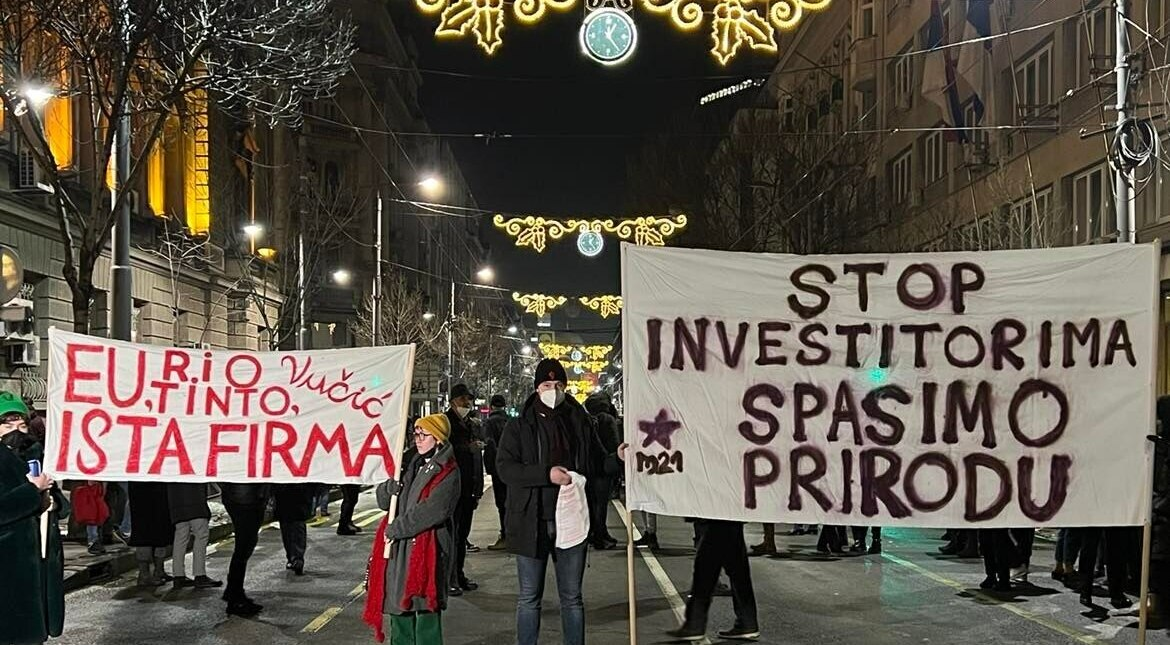
Demonstrators holding banners on 27 January

At a Kreni-Promeni protest on 27 January, demonstrators gathered in front of Novi dvor, walked towards the Republic Square and then to the building of the government of Serbia. Eco Guard also organised a protest on 30 January at which Manojlović and Dobrica Veselinović of Do not let Belgrade drown were present.

Further protests were held on 2 February in Valjevo. The following day police contacted the organiser, Manojlović, and told him that further protests would be considered illegal. Manojlović ignored the notice and organised a protest on 3 February in front of Novi dvor. The protest was attended by several hundred demonstrators.

==== 8–15 February ====
On 8 February, during a protest organised by Alliance of Environmental Organisations of Serbia and Kreni-Promeni in Kragujevac, they announced they would camp in Pioneers Park in Belgrade until the government implemented the proposed moratorium. Manojlović later added that they would camp until the dissolution of the National Assembly, which took place on 15 February and was necessary to occur due to the incoming 2022 parliamentary election.

A protest in front of Novi dvor was held on 10 February, after which environmental activists started camping in Pioneers Park. Another protest was organised on 13 February, the next day before the dissolution of the National Assembly, Manojlović announced that the last protest would be held in front of the Palace of Serbia and in New Belgrade on 15 February. A police cordon around the Palace of Serbia was deployed in order to prevent environmental activists from reaching the building. In front of the Palace of Serbia, several incidents occurred; one demonstrator was hit by a car while two more were run over by another car.

== Response and reactions ==
=== Opinions on the Project Jadar ===
Following the Ecological Uprising protest in April 2021, geologist Branislav Božović has said that "the cooperation with Rio Tinto and similar projects are highly risky for Serbia" and that "the Project Jadar and the extraction of lithium near Loznica can pollute agricultural lands and the fertile Mačva plain, and Belgrade is also at risk". (Note: Serbian: Saradnja sa Rio Tintom i slični projekti su visoko rizični za Srbiju and Serbian: projekat "Jadar" i vađenje litijuma kod Loznice mogu da zagade poljoprivredna zemljišta i plodnu mačvansku ravnicu, a u opasnosti je i Beograd.)

Botanist and academic Vladimir Stevanović has said that "the [lithium] mine would cause great and irreversible damage not only to the area where it would be opened, but to all of Serbia". (Note: Serbian: rudnik bi naneo velike i ireverzibilne štete ne samo kraju u kojem bi bio otvoren, nego celoj Srbiji.) Ratko Ristić, the dean of the Faculty of Forestry of the University of Belgrade, who supported the environmental protests, has also opposed the construction of the project, saying that "it bothers him that someone would destroy several thousand hectares of fertile land near Loznica and build a wasteland... of the most toxic materials". (Note: Serbian: Smeta da neko uništi nekoliko hiljada hektara plodne zemlje pored Loznice i napravi jaloviše... najtoksičnijih materijala.)

Inside SNS, Bratislav Jugović, then a member of the National Assembly, has expressed his opposition to Rio Tinto. However, Vladimir Đukanović has been supportive of Rio Tinto and has criticised the environmental protests. Rio Tinto itself has rejected the claims that the project would pollute the environment, instead promising that it would uphold "the highest environmental standards for the Project Jadar". (Note: Serbian: obećavaju poštovanje najviših ekoloških standarda za projekat Jadar.) Activist Zlatko Kokanović, who lives in Gornje Nedeljice, said that the project would endanger the residents of the Jadar region and has refused to sell his property to Rio Tinto.

=== Reactions to environmental protests ===
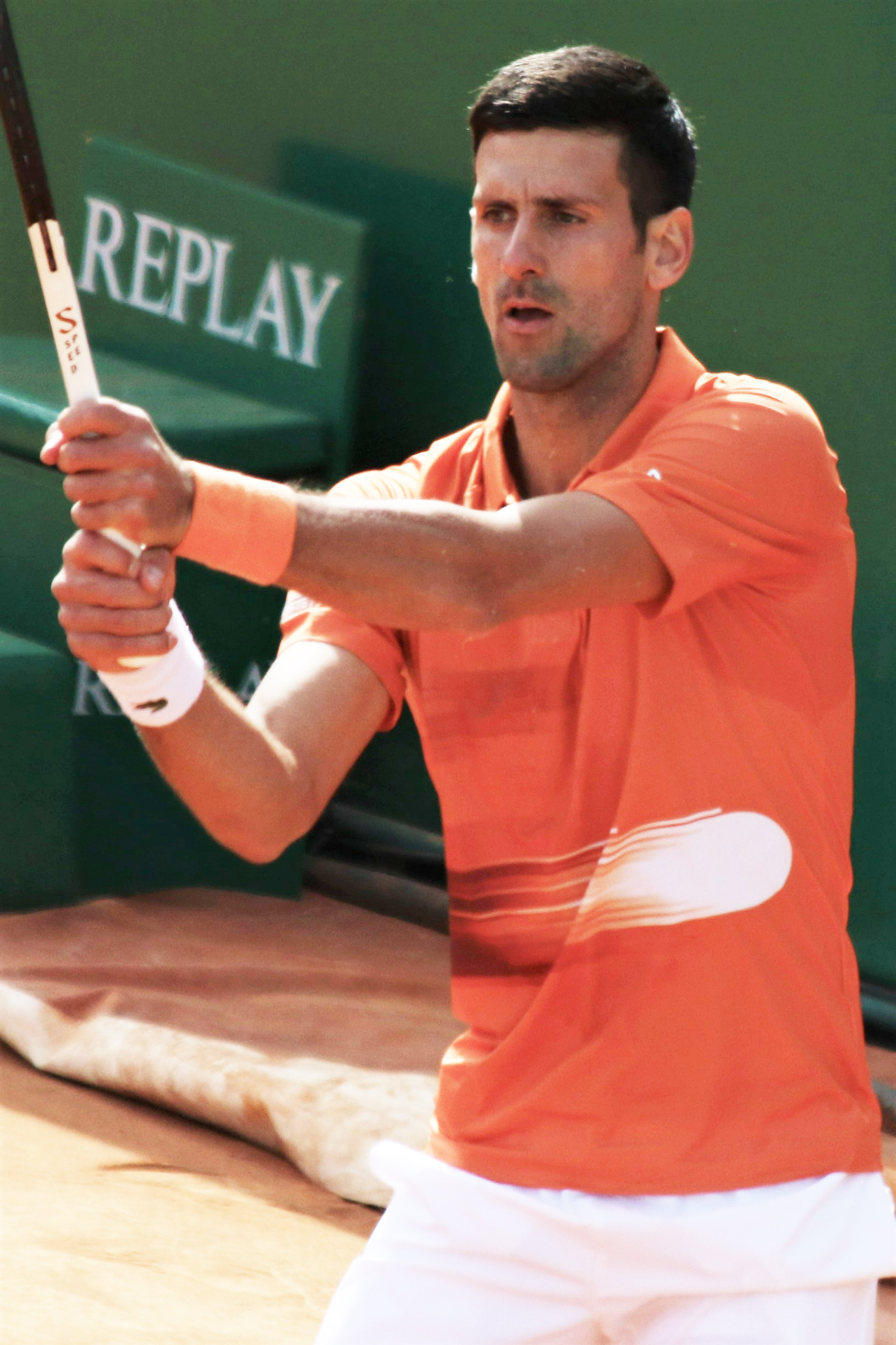
Tennis player Novak Djokovic was among the celebrities which supported the protests

Tennis player Novak Djokovic has stated his support for the protests, saying that "air, water, and food are the keys to health. Without that, every word about 'health' is redundant". (Note: Serbian: čist vazduh, voda i hrana su ključevi zdravlja. Bez toga svaka reč o 'zdravlju' je suvišna.) Actress Bojana Novaković was an active participant of the protests, while film director Emir Kusturica said "the idea to stop the mine project and Rio Tinto is definitely a good one". (Note: Serbian: Ideja zaustavljanja projekta rudnika i Rio Tinta je sigurno dobra.)

Former president of Serbia Boris Tadić has supported the protests, while members of political parties like Dveri and Serbian Party Oathkeepers also attended the protests. Jugović, who is opposed to Rio Tinto, has said that the "protests are justified" but has alleged that "Đilas and his clique abuse them". (Note: Serbian: dodaje da su protesti opravdani and Serbian: Đilas i njegova klika zloupotrebljavaju.) In response to the violent protests in Šabac on 27 November, Patriarch Porfirije called upon citizens to "protect each other, not fight". (Note: Serbian: čuvamo jedni druge, a ne da se bijemo.)

Zoran Tomić, a professor at the Faculty of Law in Belgrade, has said that the government committed three offences related to the environmental protests, two being related to the proposed changes to the laws and one to the violence that occurred at the protests. Demostat, a research and publishing NGO, conducted an opinion poll in December 2021 and found that a majority of respondents supported the environmental protests. Only 14% of the ruling SNS adherents supported the protests.

Olivera Zakić, president of REM, said that "those who protest should be arrested". (Note: Serbian: svi koji protestuju treba uhapsiti.) Vojislav Šešelj, president of the Serbian Radical Party, alleged that the "blockades are being directed from outside [Serbia] and that these are not environmental protests". (Note: Serbian: da su blokade u Srbiji dirigovane spolja i da se ne radi o ekološkim protestima.) Nebojša Krstić, a pro-government political commentator, has called for the arrest of Manojlović and has said that Kreni-Promeni activists should practice "jumping off a bridge" on 27 November.

=== Reactions to proposed changes to laws ===
Ana Stevanović of Party of Freedom and Justice has alleged that the Expropriation Law would "legalise endangering people's property, health, and life, as well as the overall environment in Serbia", while Novaković has said it would "legalise corruption and colonisation in Serbia". (Note: Serbian: legalizuju ugrožavanje imovine, zdravlja i života ljudi, kao i sveukupnu životnu sredinu u Srbiji, and Serbian: legalizovati korupciju i kolonizaciju u Srbiji.) A group of lawyers, led by Čedomir Kokanović, has also criticised the proposed changes to the Expropriation Law. N1 reported that NGOs have opposed the changes to the Law on Referendum. Stefan Jovanović, the general-secretary of the People's Party, has claimed that the changes were made because of Rio Tinto.

The National Assembly eventually adopted the changes to the Law on Referendum on 25 November and the Expropriation Law on 26 November. Further changes to the Law on Referendum were proposed and adopted by the National Assembly on 10 December.

=== Government response to laws ===
While the National Assembly was still discussing the proposed changes to the Expropriation Law and the Law on Referendum, Brnabić affirmed that the changes had no connection with Rio Tinto. Vučić said that the changes were proposed due to "large infrastructure projects that are delayed or stalled due to problems with people's property", (Note: Serbian: veliki infrastrukturni projekti koji se odlažu ili zastaju zbog problema oko imovine ljudi.) and denied the allegations that the Expropriation Law was connected to Rio Tinto.

Following the 4 December protests, Vučić proposed amendments to the Expropriation Law, then on 8 December he announced that the amendments had been withdrawn. Vučić also said that he fulfilled the demands of the protests. On 14 December, Vučić announced that the spatial plan regarding Project Jadar would be abolished; the City Assembly of Loznica voted in favour of abolishment on 16 December. Vučić's stance on Project Jadar changed by January, when he said that he "expects the government of Serbia to terminate all contracts with Rio Tinto". (Note: Serbian: očekuje da Vlada Srbije raskine sve ugovore sa kompanjiom Rio Tinto.)

Brnabić announced that the government of Serbia annulled all contracts with Rio Tinto on 20 January 2022. Ćuta and Manojlović have said that the abolition was done incorrectly and that Rio Tinto would return after the 2022 parliamentary election. Rio Tinto responded by saying that "they are considering the legal basis for making this decision and the implications it may have on our activities and people in Serbia". (Note: Serbian: razmatraju pravne osnove za donošenje ove odluke i implikacije koje ona može imati na naše aktivnosti i ljude u Srbiji.) BBC News reported that Rio Tinto's stock crashed after the announcement.

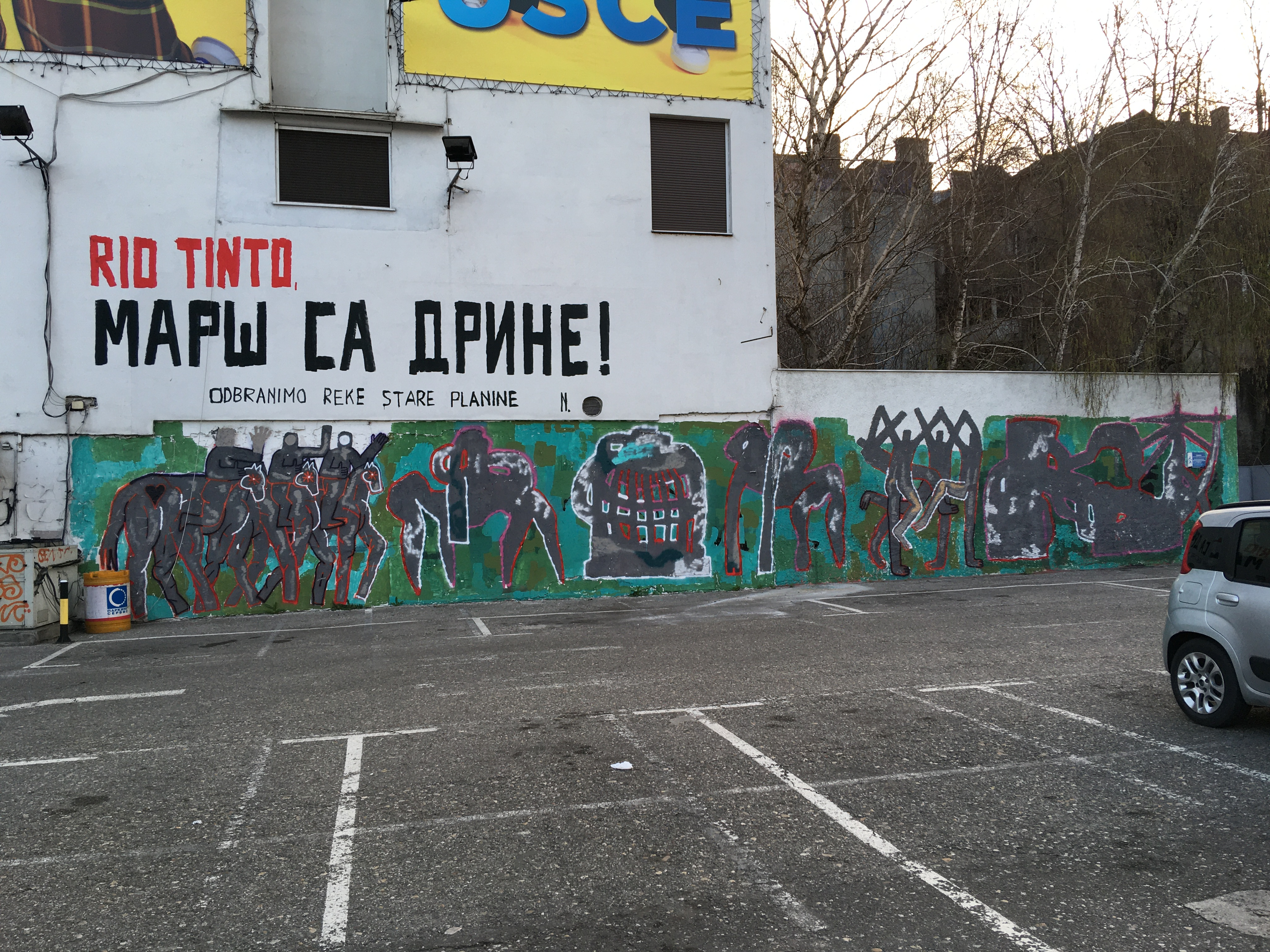
Rio Tinto Marš sa Drine! protest mural in Belgrade

== Aftermath ==
=== 2022 elections ===
In November 2021, while the protests were still ongoing, Ćuta and Zelenović announced they would form a joint alliance for the 2022 parliamentary election. They were joined in January 2022 by Do not let Belgrade drown, and created the We Must electoral alliance. The We Must alliance nominated Biljana Stojković from Assembly of Free Serbia as their presidential candidate. In the parliamentary elections, the We Must alliance won 4.7% of the popular vote and 13 seats in the National Assembly while Stojković came in sixth with 3.2% of the popular vote.

=== Future environmental protests ===
An environmental protest was held in Novi Sad on 21 July 2022. The protest turned violent when an unnamed group of people beat demonstrators with batons. Another protest was organised a week later, on 28 July, which received support from environmental organisations. Demonstrators threw paint buckets and broke into the building of the Serbian Progressive Party chapter in Novi Sad.

On the Sava embankment in New Belgrade, an environmental protest was organised in March 2023. Environmental organisations joined the Serbia Against Violence protests on 5 August 2023, roadblocking the Gazela Bridge.

=== Further actions ===
In September 2023, the destruction of homes that are on the property now-owned by Rio Tinto began. Later in December, the Economist Intelligence Unit (EIU) reported that on 22 September, Vučić signed an agreement with the European Commission on the production of lithium batteries in Serbia, and that in the agreement "the government [of Serbia] has not given up on a plan to allow the mining of lithium at Jadar". EIU stated that due to the 2023 parliamentary election, "the government is likely to stall the plans, reviving them only once the December election is over". In June 2024, Financial Times published an article regarding the topic, revealing that Serbia would "give green light to Rio Tinto" and its Project Jadar. Neue Zürcher Zeitung revealed the same. The government of Serbia then revived the project in July 2024. This resulted in another wave of environmental protests.

== See also ==
- 2020–2022 Serbian protests
