= Vladimir Obradović =

Vladimir Obradović may refer to:

- Vladimir Obradović (politician) (born 1977), Serbian politician, professor, and 2023 Belgrade mayoral candidate
- Vladimir Obradović (tennis) (born 1981), Serbian tennis coach and player
