= Ecological Uprising =

Political party in Serbia

Ecological Uprising Еколошки устанак
- Abbreviation: EU
- Leader: Aleksandar Jovanović Ćuta
- Founded: 2021 (first); 2023 (second)
- Dissolved: 11 June 2022 (first)
- Split from: Together (second)
- Succeeded by: Together (first)
- Ideology: Green politics; Pro-Europeanism
- Colours: Green
- National Assembly: 0 / 250
- Assembly of Vojvodina: 2 / 120
- City Assembly of Belgrade: 1 / 110

Website
- ekoloskiustanak.org.rs

Ecological Uprising (Serbian: Еколошки устанак, romanised: Ekološki ustanak, abbr. EU) is a green political party in Serbia. It is led by Aleksandar Jovanović Ćuta.

Formed as a political and protest movement in 2021, EU gained presence during the 2021–2022 Serbian environmental protests. Ćuta was elected to the National Assembly of Serbia at the head of We Must (Moramo) coalition in the 2022 Serbian parliamentary election. On 11 June 2022, the movement was merged into a new political party called Together (Zajedno!). Ćuta left Together in September 2023 due to internal disagreements and re-established EU, which joined the Serbia Against Violence coalition later that year. In September 2026, EU decided not to contest the 2026 Serbian parliamentary election and backed the Student List.

== History ==
=== Formation ===
The Ecological Uprising movement grew out of a series of environmental actions in Serbia in 2021. Jovanović, working with a movement called "Defend the Rivers of Stara Planina," used the phrase "ecological uprising" in his call for a citizens' protest at the national assembly on 10 April 2021. The protest, which drew thousands of people, called for a moratorium on the construction of small hydroelectric plants and for more intensive reforestation across Serbia. Another protest was held in September of the same year, with more than thirty environmental organisations rallied around the "Ecological Uprising" banner. The latter event was the catalyst for an ongoing series of protests of environmental protests over the following months, with Jovanović and Ecological Uprising playing a leading role. The protests came to focus in particular on opposition to Rio Tinto's proposed jadarite mining near the Jadar River.

Jovanović indicated in mid-2021 that he wanted the Ecological Uprising movement to participate in the 2022 Belgrade City Assembly election. Speculation grew as to his possible coalition partners, with both the Don't Let Belgrade Drown (NDB) group and Nebojša Zelenović's Action movement mentioned as possibilities. In November 2021, Jovanović said that Ecological Uprising would participate in both the Belgrade election and the 2022 Serbian parliamentary election; in so doing, he said that the movement's ultimate goal was to "remove the cause of the biggest pollution in Serbia, which is the regime of Aleksandar Vučić."

=== 2022 election ===
Jovanović and Zelenović signed an electoral agreement to create a green-left political bloc in November 2021. The We Must coalition was formally launched in January 2022, with NDB and other parties also participating. The We Must coalition ultimately won representation in both the republican and Belgrade assemblies, taking thirteen seats in each body. Jovanović, who led the coalition's electoral list at the republic level, was elected as a parliamentarian.

On 1 June 2022, representatives of Ecological Uprising, the Action movement, and the Assembly of Free Serbia announced that they would henceforth act as one party. The new party, known as Together (Zajedno!), was formally introduced on 11 June, with Jovanović, Zelenović, and Assembly of Free Serbia leader Biljana Stojković as its co-presidents.

=== 2023 ===
After the beginning of the Serbia Against Violence protests in May 2023, EU acted autonomously inside Together. On 6 September 2023, Ćuta announced that he and other EU members left Together due to internal disagreements. EU became part of the Serbia Against Violence (SPN) coalition in October 2023, a coalition of political parties organising the 2023 protests. SPN announced that it would contest the parliamentary, Vojvodina provincial, and Belgrade City Assembly elections, all scheduled for 17 December 2023. In the parliamentary election, SPN won 65 seats, 4 of which went to EU. (Note: The electoral performance table below, based on the official results, lists five seats.)

=== 2026 election ===
Ahead of the 2026 Serbian parliamentary election, EU formed the "People's Serbia" (Narodna Srbija) coalition with the People's Movement of Serbia (NPS) and the New Face of Serbia (NLS). On 15 September 2026, the coalition announced that it would not field candidates and would instead back the Student List; out of respect for the activists who had collected them, it submitted the signatures gathered for its list, which was proclaimed and then withdrawn. The election, held on 25 October 2026, was won by the Student List with 140 of the 250 seats.

== Electoral performance ==
=== Parliamentary elections ===
National Assembly of Serbia
Year	Leader	Popular vote	% of popular vote	#	# of seats	Seat change	Coalition	Status	Ref.
2022	Aleksandar Jovanović Ćuta	178,733	4.84%	▲5th	4 / 250	▲4	We Must	Opposition	
2023	Aleksandar Jovanović Ćuta	902,450	24.32%	▲2nd	5 / 250	▲1	SPN	Opposition	
2026	Aleksandar Jovanović Ćuta	Did not participate			0 / 250	▼5	Supported SL	Extra-parliamentary	

=== Presidential elections ===
President of Serbia
Year	Candidate	1st round popular vote		% of popular vote	2nd round popular vote		% of popular vote	Notes
2022	Biljana Stojković	6th	122,378	3.30%	—N/a	—	—	Supported Stojković

=== Provincial elections ===
Assembly of Vojvodina
Year	Leader	Popular vote	% of popular vote	#	# of seats	Seat change	Coalition	Status	Ref
2023	Aleksandar Jovanović Ćuta	215,197	22.55%	▲2nd	2 / 120	▲2	SPN	Opposition	

=== Belgrade City Assembly elections ===
City Assembly of Belgrade
Year	Leader	Popular vote	% of popular vote	#	# of seats	Seat change	Coalition	Status	Ref.
2022	Aleksandar Jovanović Ćuta	99,078	11.04%	▲3rd	3 / 110	▲3	We Must	Opposition	
2023	Aleksandar Jovanović Ćuta	325,429	35.39%	▲2nd	2 / 110	▼1	SPN	Snap election	
2024	Aleksandar Jovanović Ćuta	89,430	12.42%	▼3rd	1 / 110	▼1	BB	Opposition	
