= Vladimir Obradović (politician) =

Serbian politician and professor

- Владимир Обрадовић
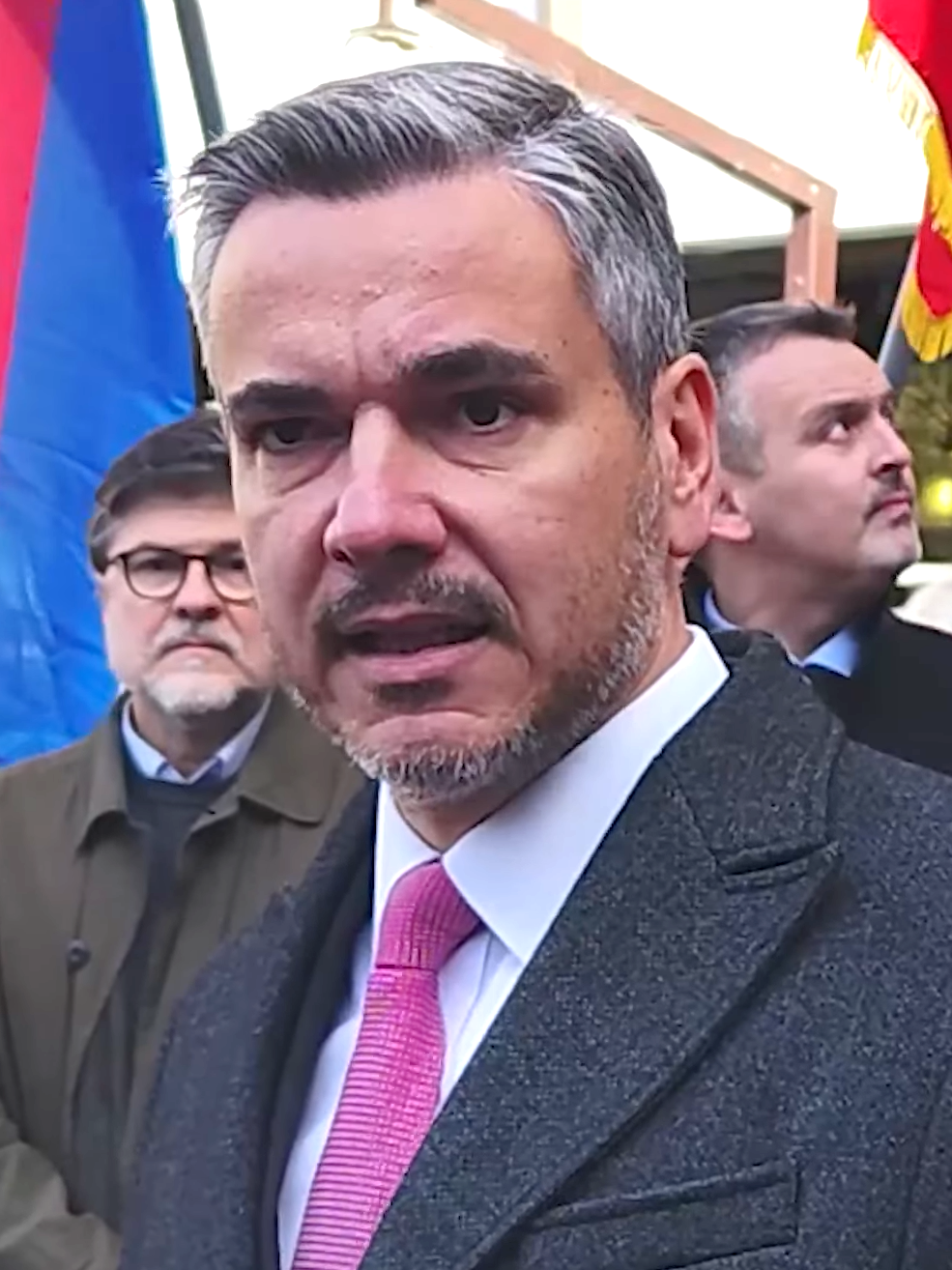
- Obradović in 2023

Member of the Temporary Council of the City of Belgrade
- In office 30 October 2023 – 24 June 2024

Member of the National Assembly
- In office 1 August 2022 – 6 February 2024
- President: Vladeta Janković (acting) Vladimir Orlić

Personal details
- Born: 5 May 1977 (age 49) Belgrade, SR Serbia, SFR Yugoslavia
- Party: DSS (before); Independent (now)
- Other political affiliations: PE (2022–2024); SPN (2023–2024)
- Education: University of Belgrade
- Occupation: Professor; politician

Vladimir Obradović (Serbian Cyrillic: Владимир Обрадовић; born 5 May 1977) is a Serbian politician and university professor who served as a member of the National Assembly of Serbia from 2022 to 2024. In October 2023, the Serbia Against Violence opposition coalition named Obradović as their candidate for Mayor of Belgrade at the 2023 City Assembly election.

A former member of the Democratic Party of Serbia (DSS), Obradović also served as an advisor to minister without portfolio Nenad Popović.

== Early life and education ==
Obradović was born on 5 May 1977 in Belgrade, SR Serbia, SFR Yugoslavia. He completed primary and secondary school in his hometown. In 1998, he enrolled in the Faculty of Organizational Sciences (FON), majoring in management, which he graduated in 2004. At the same faculty, he also completed his doctoral studies, earning the title of Doctor of Technical Sciences - Organizational Sciences.

== Academic career ==
He is a full professor at the Faculty of Organizational Sciences, where he is also the head of the Department for Interdisciplinary Research in Management.

He is the vice-president for finance, administration and events of the International Project Management Association (IPMA), president of the Serbian Project Management Association (IPMA Serbia). He is also the editor-in-chief of the European Project Management Journal and a member of the editorial board of the International Journal of Project Management, as well as the international journals Project Leadership and Society, and Information Technologies and Learning Tools Journal.

== Political career ==
Obradović started his political career as a member of the centre-right Democratic Party of Serbia (DSS) and was its candidate in the 2004 local elections in Rakovica. He served in DSS's economic council.

In 2018, Obradović served as an advisor to the pro-Russian minister without portfolio Nenad Popović during the first cabinet of Ana Brnabić. According to Obradović, the government engaged him on professional projects in the field of project management and strategic management, adding that the same government officially declared him "politically ineligible" and "forbade" him to be a member of the Council for the Fight Against Corruption.

He was among the few professors of the Faculty of Organizational Sciences who publicly spoke about the plagiarism of finance minister Siniša Mali's doctoral dissertation, and he openly opposed the fact that the Government of Serbia appointed people with controversial biographies to university and faculty councils.

Prior to the 2022 general election, Obradović joined the opposition United for the Victory of Serbia (UZPS) coalition. In an interview with Vreme, he pointed out that he could not "come to terms with the politics of the ruling regime in Serbia and that university professors must take the lead in reform initiatives and encourage changes in society". At the proposal of the Party of Freedom and Justice (SSP), Obradović, as a non-party candidate was on the UZPS electoral list as a candidate for the National Assembly. In addition, he was also a candidate in the Belgrade City Assembly election. Obradović was elected member of the National Assembly and has been serving since 1 August 2022 in the Forward to Europe parliamentary group.

In October 2023, the Serbia Against Violence opposition coalition named Obradović as their candidate for Mayor of Belgrade at the upcoming City Assembly Election. Following the resignation of Aleksandar Šapić as the mayor of Belgrade, Obradović was appointed member of the Temporary Council of the City of Belgrade.
