= Together for Serbia =

Political party in Serbia

Together for Serbia Заједно за Србију Zajedno za Srbiju
- Abbreviation: ZZS
- President: Dušan Petrović (2012–2016); Nebojša Zelenović (2016–2022)
- Founder: Dušan Petrović
- Founded: 25 February 2013
- Dissolved: 11 June 2022
- Split from: Democratic Party
- Merged into: Together
- Headquarters: Belgrade
- Ideology: Green politics; Pro-Europeanism
- Political position: Centre-left
- European affiliation: European Greens (intention to join)
- Colours: Green

Website
- zajednozasrbiju.rs

Together for Serbia (Serbian Cyrillic: Заједно за Србију, romanized: Zajedno za Srbiju, ZZS) was a centre-left political party in Serbia. It was formed by Dušan Petrović in 2012, and he led the party until 2016, when he was succeeded by Nebojša Zelenović.

== History ==
Party was created by a broken-off fraction of the Democratic Party (DS) in the aftermath of the 2012 elections after which president Boris Tadić lost to his opponent Tomislav Nikolić and inner arguments maintaint on resulting in early party elections and Tadic's withdrawal from the leadership, settling for an honorary presidential title, in favor of Belgrade mayor Dragan Đilas. A total of 7 MPs left the DS and founded in 2012 the "Together for Serbia" parliamentary club. Its leader is former minister Dušan Petrović.

At the 2014 election, ZZS teamed up with Boris Tadić's fraction of the DS in formation and will run on the election in a coalition with the League of Social Democrats of Vojvodina (LSV).

In 2018, the Party was one of the founding members of the big tent opposition coalition called the Alliance for Serbia (SzS). The alliance announced the 2020 Serbian parliamentary elections. In May 2019 ZZS formed a union with Democratic Party (DS) and Tadić's SDS. On 23 February 2020, Together for Serbia announced that they will participate in the 2020 elections on local (municipal) level, shortly after that Alliance for Serbia's leadership commented that Together for Serbia disqualificated itself from the coalition.

The party keeps close ties and cooperates with the centre-left Do not let Belgrade drown (NDB), and it has previously had ties with the centrist Civic Democratic Forum (GDF). In July 2021, ZZS announced that it applied for membership to the European Green Party. The leader of ZZS, Nebojša Zelenović, announced the formation of "Action", a political group built around 28 environmental civic groups that support the "Green Agreement of Serbia", in June 2021. Later during the environmental protests in November, Zelenović, Dobrica Veselinović, leader of the NDB and Aleksandar Jovanović Ćuta, environmental activist and de facto leader of the protests, have announced the formation of a joint list for the upcoming general elections and Belgrade City Assembly election. The media dubbed the coalition as "Green-Left bloc". The formation was finalized on 19 January, when it was announced to the public that the coalition has been officially formed.

Alongside the Assembly of Free Serbia and Ecological Uprising, the party was merged into Together on 11 June 2022.

== Electoral results ==
=== Parliamentary elections ===
National Assembly of Serbia
Year	Popular vote	% of popular vote	# of seats	Seat change	Coalition	Status
2012	Split from Democratic Party		7 / 250	New		Opposition
2014	204,767	5.70%	2 / 250	▼5	With NDS-Z-LSV	Opposition
2016	227,589	6.02%	1 / 250	▼1	With DS-NS-DSHV-ZZŠ	Opposition
2020	Election boycott		0 / 250	▼1		Extra-parliamentary
2022	178,733	4.84%	4 / 250	▲4	We Must	Opposition

=== Presidential elections ===
Election year	Candidate	1st Round		2nd Round		Results
Election year	Candidate	# Votes	% Votes	# Votes	% Votes	Results
2017 (Note: Supported Vuk Jeremić as independent candidate.)	Vuk Jeremić	206,676	5.75%	—N/a		Lost ✗
2022	Biljana Stojković	122,378	3.30%	—N/a		Lost ✗
