= We Must (Serbia) =

Political coalition in Serbia

We Must Морамо Moramo
- Representatives: Aleksandar Jovanović Ćuta; Biljana Stojković; Biljana Đorđević; Dobrica Veselinović; Nebojša Zelenović; Radomir Lazović
- Founded: 19 January 2022
- Dissolved: 2022
- Ideology: Green politics; Pro-Europeanism
- Political position: Centre-left to left-wing
- European affiliation: European Green Party; Party of the European Left (cooperation)
- Colours: Green Purple

Website
- moramo.rs

We Must (Serbian: Морамо, Moramo; stylised as MORAMO,) was an opposition electoral alliance that participated in the 2022 Serbian general elections.

Initially formed in November 2021, when Together for Serbia (ZZS), Do not let Belgrade drown (NDB) and Ecological Uprising (EU) signed an agreement to participate in the 2022 general election under a joint list, it was formalised as a coalition in January 2022. Its representatives had previously played a major role during the 2021–2022 environmental protests. The coalition won 4.7% of the popular vote and managed to cross the electoral threshold, while its presidential candidate, Biljana Stojković, won 3.3% of the popular vote.

Following the election, a part of the coalition transformed into the Together political party in June 2022 and We Must ceased to exist. Throughout the 2022 campaign period, We Must has stylised itself as a "green-left coalition". We Must had received support from parties affiliated with the European Green Party and Party of the European Left.

== History ==
=== Background and formation ===
Aleksandar Jovanović Ćuta, an activist and co-founder of the "Defend the Rivers of Stara Planina" organisation, organised and took part in environmental protests in January and April 2021. Around 60 environmental organisations took part in a protest in April, while the protests later continued after September. The Do not let Belgrade drown (NDB) movement, represented by Dobrica Veselinović and Radomir Lazović, and Together for Serbia (ZZS), led by Nebojša Zelenović, supported the environmental protests, and they formed a connection shortly after. The protests reached climax in late November and early December 2021, and they were regularly organised up till 15 February 2022. Zelenović formed the "Action", a political group built around ZZS that included 28 environmental civic groups that supported the "Green Agreement for Serbia", in June 2021. Lazović later presented a proposal for cooperation between opposition parties with Zelenović in September 2021. The media later dubbed the coalition between Ćuta, Lazović, and Zelenović as the "green-left bloc".

A cooperation agreement between Zelenović and Ćuta was signed in November 2021; additionally, they had announced a joint cooperation in the 2022 general election. On 19 January 2022, the coalition was formalised under the name We Must. During the presentation, it was announced that Ćuta would be head the parliamentary ballot list, Veselinović would head the Belgrade City Assembly ballot list, while Zelenović would represent the parliamentary ballot list. Zelenović stated that the members of the coalition had applied for the membership in the European Greens, and he cited the Spanish Podemos as the inspiration.

=== 2022 election and aftermath ===
The We Must coalition held its first campaign rally in Gornje Nedeljice on 27 February, where they had announced Biljana Stojković as their presidential candidate. The coalition also campaigned throughout other locations in Serbia. The Slovenian The Left party stated its support for We Must in late March. The coalition won 4.7% of the popular vote and 13 seats in the National Assembly, while Stojković won 3.3% of the popular vote in the presidential election. Following the elections, Ćuta and Zelenović announced the formation of a joint political party, later revealed as Together. It was also announced that Stojković, Ćuta, and Zelenović would serve as co-leaders. During the same period, a conflict emerged due to the dispute over the coalition's name. NDB had claimed the name as its intellectual property, although it later withdrew the request that it had sent to the Intellectual Property Office (ZIS). Lazović argued that the intellectual property would be the property of the coalition, and not NDB. During an interview in June, Zelenović had affirmed that the coalition still exists. In late June, Together held a meeting with Party of Freedom and Justice (SSP) and Zdravko Ponoš; NDB did not participate. We Must split into two parliamentary groups during the first constitutive session of the thirteenth convocation of the National Assembly on 1 August. Zelenović stated that the Together parliamentary group would send an initiative regarding the ban of lithium and boron. NDB had stated that they would continue their cooperation with Together within the We Must coalition, while they would also serve in opposition and decline any cooperation with the Serbian Progressive Party (SNS) and Socialist Party of Serbia (SPS). In a December 2022 interview, Aleksandar Jovanović Ćuta has confirmed that We Must does not exist anymore.

== Ideology and position ==
The We Must coalition was formed by the Together for Serbia (ZZS), Do not let Belgrade drown, and the Ecological Uprising movement, led by Ćuta, that emphasised their support towards green politics. During their founding conference, its representatives stated that they would represent green-left values, and that some of their main goals would include the abandonment of Rio Tinto's plan to excavate lithium in Serbia, and to defeat the Serbian Progressive Party (SNS) in the 2022 election. Zelenović also stated that "it is necessary for Serbia to join the green transformations, otherwise it would remain a place for dirty technologies, cheap labor and colonization", and that Serbia should be more orientated towards the European Union and the Western world. Its leaders had stated support for "social justice and basic needs for every citizen", and had also commented that "we must overcome the authoritarian regimes in the Balkans". Moramo condemned the request of Dveri to cancel EuroPride in July 2022.

The We Must coalition was also described as "the new faces of the opposition's left-wing". Croatian press compared the glaring similarities in the names and the visual identities of We Must to the We Can! party, while Serbian press also compared them to the Montenegrin United Reform Action. The coalition cooperated with the European Greens, while it had also received support from the European Left during the 2022 electoral campaign. Political parties such as the German Die Linke, Danish Red–Green Alliance and Slovenian Levica had also voiced its support for We Must.

== Members ==
The coalition was also made up of the Local Front and the Forum of Romani People of Serbia.

Name		Leader	Main ideology	National Assembly	Vojvodina Assembly	Belgrade Assembly
Together		Collective leadership	Green politics	8 / 250	0 / 120	3 / 110
Do not let Belgrade drown	NDB	Collective leadership	Green politics	5 / 250	0 / 120	10 / 110

== Electoral performance ==
=== Parliamentary elections ===
National Assembly
Year	Leader	Popular vote	% of popular vote	# of seats	Seat change	Government
2022	Nebojša Zelenović	178,733	4.84%	13 / 250	▲13	Opposition

=== Presidential elections ===
President of Serbia
Election year	Candidate		1st round		2nd round		Results
Election year	Name	Party	# Votes	% Votes	# Votes	% Votes	Results
2022	Biljana Stojković	Ind.	122,378	3.30%	—N/a		Lost ✗

=== Belgrade City Assembly ===
City Assembly of Belgrade
Year	Leader	Popular vote	% of popular vote	# of seats	Seat change	Government
2022	Dobrica Veselinović	99,078	11.04% (3rd)	13 / 110	▲13	opposition
