= Together (Serbia) =

Political party in Serbia

Together Заједно Zajedno
- Co-presidents: Biljana Stojković; Nebojša Zelenović; Aleksandar Jovanović Ćuta (until September 2023)
- Founders: Biljana Stojković; Nebojša Zelenović; Aleksandar Jovanović Ćuta
- Founded: 11 June 2022
- Dissolved: 27 December 2024
- Merger of: Together for Serbia; Ecological Uprising; Assembly of Free Serbia
- Merged into: Democratic Party
- Headquarters: Nušićeva 6, Belgrade
- Youth wing: Together Youth
- Ideology: Green politics; Regionalism
- Political position: Left-wing
- European affiliation: European Greens (cooperation)
- Colours: Green

Website
- zajedno-moramo.rs (archived URL)

Together (Serbian: Заједно, romanised: Zajedno) was a green political party in Serbia. Biljana Stojković and Nebojša Zelenović served as its co-presidents. Aleksandar Jovanović Ćuta was also its co-president until September 2023.

The party was formed in June 2022 as a merger of Together for Serbia, Ecological Uprising, and Assembly of Free Serbia, which were member parties of the We Must electoral alliance that took part in the April 2022 general elections. During 2023, it was an organiser of mass anti-government protests, which were held between May and November. Jovanović, one of the original co-presidents, left Together with other Ecological Uprising members due to internal disagreements in September 2023. Despite the Serbia Against Violence coalition winning 65 seats in the National Assembly in the 2023 parliamentary election, Together did not win any and thus lost representation. In December 2024, the party merged into the Democratic Party.

Together served in opposition to the Serbian Progressive Party. A left-wing party, Together supported workers' rights, social justice, environmental protection, and direct democracy. It favoured the accession of Serbia to the European Union and sanctioning Russia due to the Russian invasion of Ukraine. During its existence, Together cooperated with the European Greens and its member parties and affiliates.

== History ==
=== Formation ===
We Must (Moramo) was an electoral alliance that participated in the April 2022 general elections and won 13 seats in the National Assembly of Serbia and 13 seats in the City Assembly of Belgrade. Its members were Do not let Belgrade drown (NDB), Together for Serbia (ZZS), and Ecological Uprising (EU). After the elections, Nebojša Zelenović and Aleksandar Jovanović Ćuta, who led ZZS and EU, respectively, announced the creation of a joint political party, which would also include the Assembly of Free Serbia of Biljana Stojković. They first signed a cooperation agreement on 1 June 2022.

Ćuta said that they would continue cooperating with NDB but that they would form separate parliamentary groups in the National Assembly. Zelenović announced that the party would be led by three co-presidents and that its members of the City Assembly of Belgrade would also have influence on how the party would work. Its founding assembly was held on 11 June 2022, at which its members and co-presidents announced their political ambitions and the name of the party, Together (Zajedno).

=== Activities ===
Co-presidents of Together

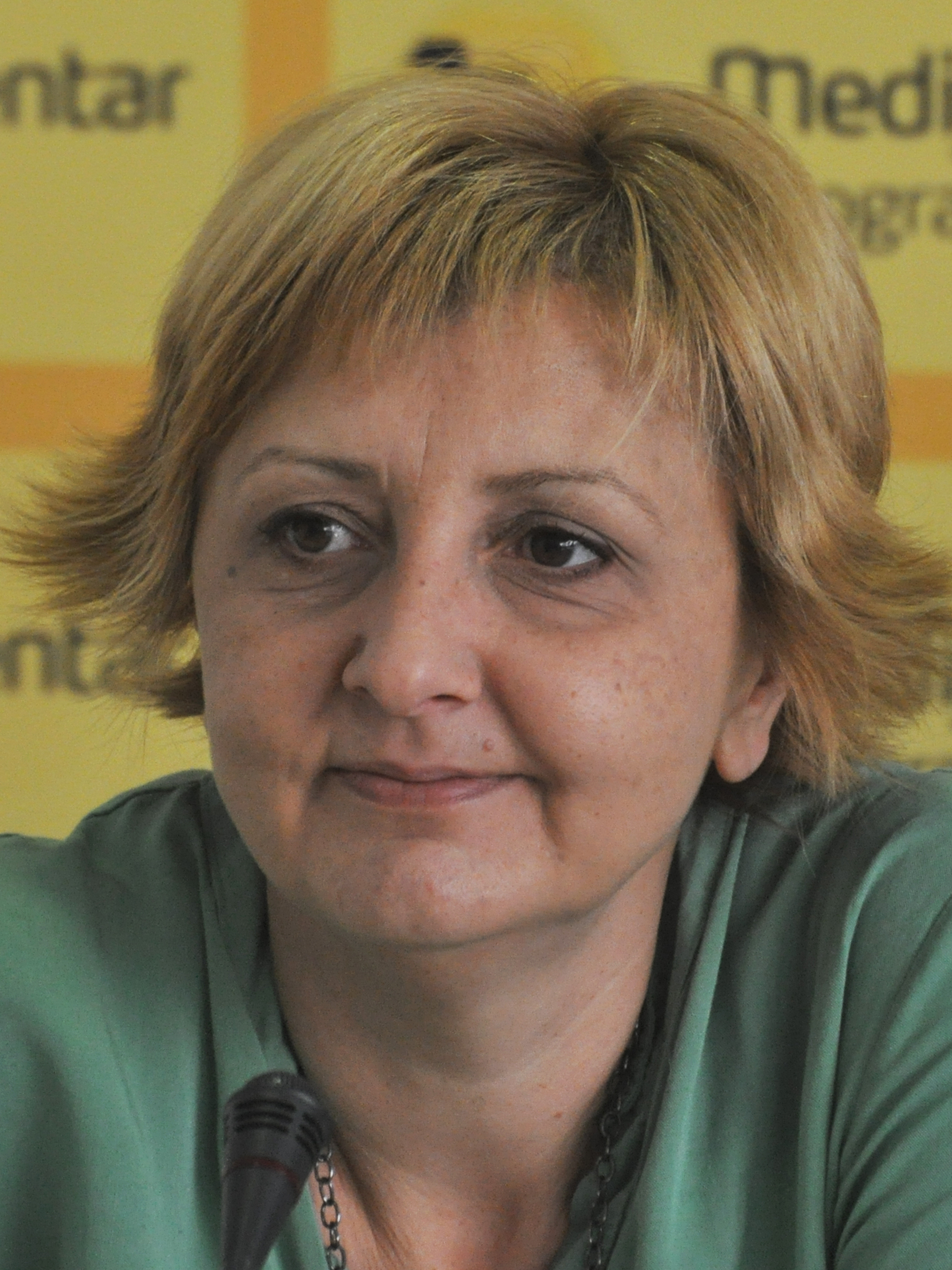
Biljana Stojković

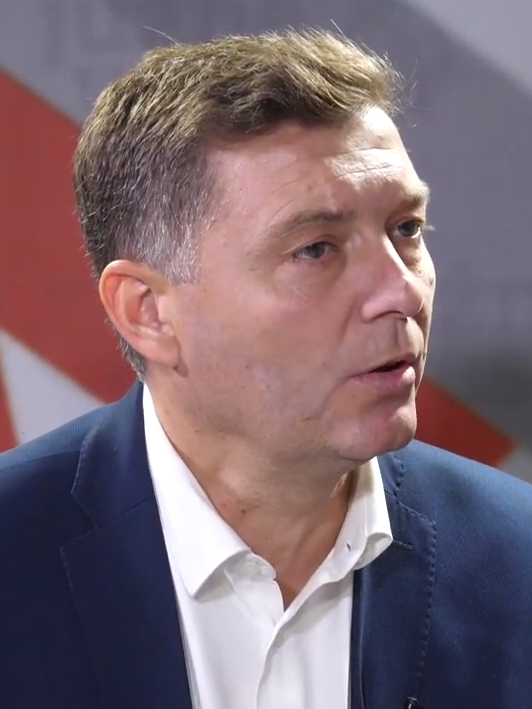
Nebojša Zelenović

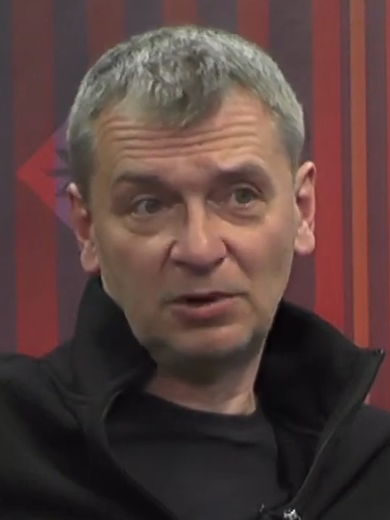
Aleksandar Jovanović Ćuta (until September 2023)

After Together's establishment, Zelenović announced that it would begin a "green campaign" (zelena kampanja) somewhere in June. The campaign, named "Green Wave" (zeleni talas), began on 23 June 2022. A week later, Together organised a meeting at which it invited former members of the Moramo and United for the Victory of Serbia (UZPS) electoral alliances. Zdravko Ponoš, who was the presidential candidate of the UZPS alliance, Party of Freedom and Justice (SSP), and Movement of Free Citizens (PSG) eventually participated in the meeting, at which they discussed establishing closer parliamentary connections. In July, Together stated its support for an environmental protest that was organised in Novi Sad. The protest turned violent when an unnamed group of people beat demonstrators with batons; Together condemned the violence.

Along with NDB and People's Party, Together co-nominated Zoran Lutovac of the Democratic Party (DS) for the post of the vice-president of the National Assembly; Lutovac was elected during its first session on 2 August. A month later, its offices in Novi Sad were attacked by an unknown man; a group of masked men attacked members of Together at Petrovaradin in April 2023. In December 2022, Together announced that it would organise an internal election to elect its ballot representative for a potential snap election and ultimately the candidate for the position of mayor of Belgrade, to be held from 27 February to 4 March 2023. Together also demanded early elections for the City Assembly to be held in Belgrade. In total, seven candidates registered themselves; Đorđe Miketić, a member of the National Assembly, won the competition.

Together signed an agreement with Solidarity in January 2023, after which Solidarity became a part of Together. Later in April 2023, Together also established connections with Serbia Centre (SRCE), led by Ponoš. Following the Belgrade school shooting and Mladenovac and Smederevo shootings in May 2023, Together has taken part in the mass anti-government protests as one of its organisers. In August 2023, Together, DS, and SRCE signed a cooperation agreement. Ćuta and other EU members left Together in September 2023, citing their internal disagreements with Miketić and Zelenović. Together became part of the Serbia Against Violence (SPN) coalition in October 2023, a coalition of political parties organising the 2023 protests. SPN announced that it would contest the parliamentary, Vojvodina provincial, and Belgrade City Assembly elections, all scheduled for 17 December 2023. In the parliamentary election, SPN won 65 seats, though considering that the first Together candidate was placed in the 70th position, Together lost all of its representation in the National Assembly.

After the 2023 elections, SPN organised anti-government protests until 30 December. Although Together won representation in the City Assembly of Belgrade, the Assembly was not constituted because quorum was not met during the constitutive session. A new election for 2 June was then called. Together opposed participation in the new election on the grounds that electoral conditions have not changed. This position was also held by SRCE and SSP. This ultimately led to the dissolution of SPN in April 2024, while local boards of Together in Belgrade, Novi Sad, Niš, and Pančevo disassociated themselves from the party due to the decision to boycott the election. The Novi Sad board joined PSG in June 2024. In the same month, Stojković announced that Together would form new local boards, due to reports that the party would allegedly go extinct.

Shortly after Srđan Milivojević became the president of DS, it was announced that Together would merge into DS. This was officialised on 27 December 2024.

== Ideology and platform ==
At its founding assembly, Together defined itself as a green-left party that would insist on the promotion of left-wing politics, workers' rights, social justice, environmental protection, and direct democracy. It was also supportive of the energy transition. Together served in parliamentary opposition to the Serbian Progressive Party.

Together was a green and regionalist political party. Jovana Gec, a journalist from the Associated Press, and Dušan Komarčević, a journalist from Radio Free Europe/Radio Liberty, described Together as a left-wing party. Dušan Spasojević, a Faculty of Political Sciences professor, also placed Together on the left wing of the political spectrum. Together supported the manifestation of 2022 EuroPride event in Belgrade. Stojković has criticised the government's attempt to cancel the event. Together supported the initiative to forbid lithium mining.

Together expressed its support for the Fiat Serbia workers who protested in June 2022. The workers roadblocked and demanded higher salaries. While attending the protest, Stojković accused the government of not supporting workers rights. A month later, Together came in support of a protest in Krčedin where demonstrators demanded the local government provide them water. In August 2022, Together supported a farmers protest in Kragujevac and started an initiative to increase the agricultural budget.

An anti-corruption party, Together has said that "Serbia needs prosecutorial courage like that of Laura Kövesi" (je Srbiji potrebna "tužilaška hrabrost" poput rumunske tužiteljke Laure Koveši). It was supportive of the accession of Serbia to the European Union. Although it supported the introduction of sanctions on Russia due to the invasion of Ukraine, Ćuta has distanced himself from the statement since Zelenović announced it in October 2022. Zelenović has also said that "Serbia needs to form a strategic agreement with the West" and has criticised military neutrality. Together had condemned the spraying of the Z military symbol graffiti in Novi Sad in July 2022, saying that the city government should instead "provide all available institutional material assistance to refugees and victims of the [Russian invasion of Ukraine]" (treba da pruži svaku raspoloživu institucionalnu materijalnu pomoć izbeglicama i žrtvama [Ruske invazije na Ukrajinu]).

In August 2022, Together demanded the removal of a Chetnik mural that was drawn in an elementary school backyard in Šabac. Later in April 2023, Together expressed its support for banning Leviathan Movement, a neo-fascist organisation.

== Organisation ==
Together was led by co-presidents, this being Stojković, Zelenović, and Jovanović until September 2023. During its time in the National Assembly, Zelenović served as the president of its parliamentary group, which had eight members, while Ćuta served as deputy president. In the City Assembly of Belgrade, three members were affiliated, them being Dejan Atanacković, Miloš Baković Jadžić, and Milica Marušić Jablanović. Together had a youth wing named Together Youth.

Its headquarters was located at Nušićeva 6, Belgrade.

=== International cooperation ===
Shortly before Together was formalised, its representatives took part at the European Green Party congress in Riga. At the European Greens congress in Copenhagen in December 2022, Zelenović proposed the creation of a regional Balkan Green Party. In March 2023, Together established cooperation with green parties like Green Alternative – Sustainable Development of Croatia, United Reform Action, and Democratic Renewal of Macedonia. In the same month, Stojković was featured as one of the speakers at the Alliance 90/The Greens congress. In June 2023, its representatives again took part in a European Greens congress in Vienna.

Solidarity, which merged into Together in January 2023, became a partner of the Party of the European Left in December 2022. Its representatives took part in a European Left gathering in June 2023. Solidarity left Together in February 2024.

=== List of presidents ===
#	President	Birth–Death	Term start	Term end
1	Aleksandar Jovanović Ćuta	1966–	11 June 2022	6 September 2023
1	Biljana Stojković	1972–	11 June 2022	27 December 2024
1	Nebojša Zelenović	1975–	11 June 2022	27 December 2024

== Electoral performance ==
=== Parliamentary elections ===
National Assembly of Serbia
Year	Leader	Popular vote	% of popular vote	#	# of seats	Seat change	Coalition	Status	Ref.
2023	Nebojša Zelenović	902,450	24.32%	▲2nd	0 / 250	▼5	SPN	Extra-parliamentary	

=== Provincial elections ===
Assembly of Vojvodina
Year	Leader	Popular vote	% of popular vote	#	# of seats	Seat change	Coalition	Status	Ref.
2023	Nebojša Zelenović	466,035	22.55%	▲2nd	2 / 250	▲2	SPN	Opposition	

=== Belgrade City Assembly elections ===
City Assembly of Belgrade
Year	Leader	Popular vote	% of popular vote	#	# of seats	Seat change	Coalition	Status	Ref.
2023	Đorđe Miketić	352,429	35.39%	▲2nd	2 / 250	▲2	SPN	Snap election	
2024	Nebojša Zelenović	Election boycott			0 / 250	▼2	–	Extra-parliamentary	–
