= Biljana Stojković =

Serbian biologist and activist

- Биљана Стојковић
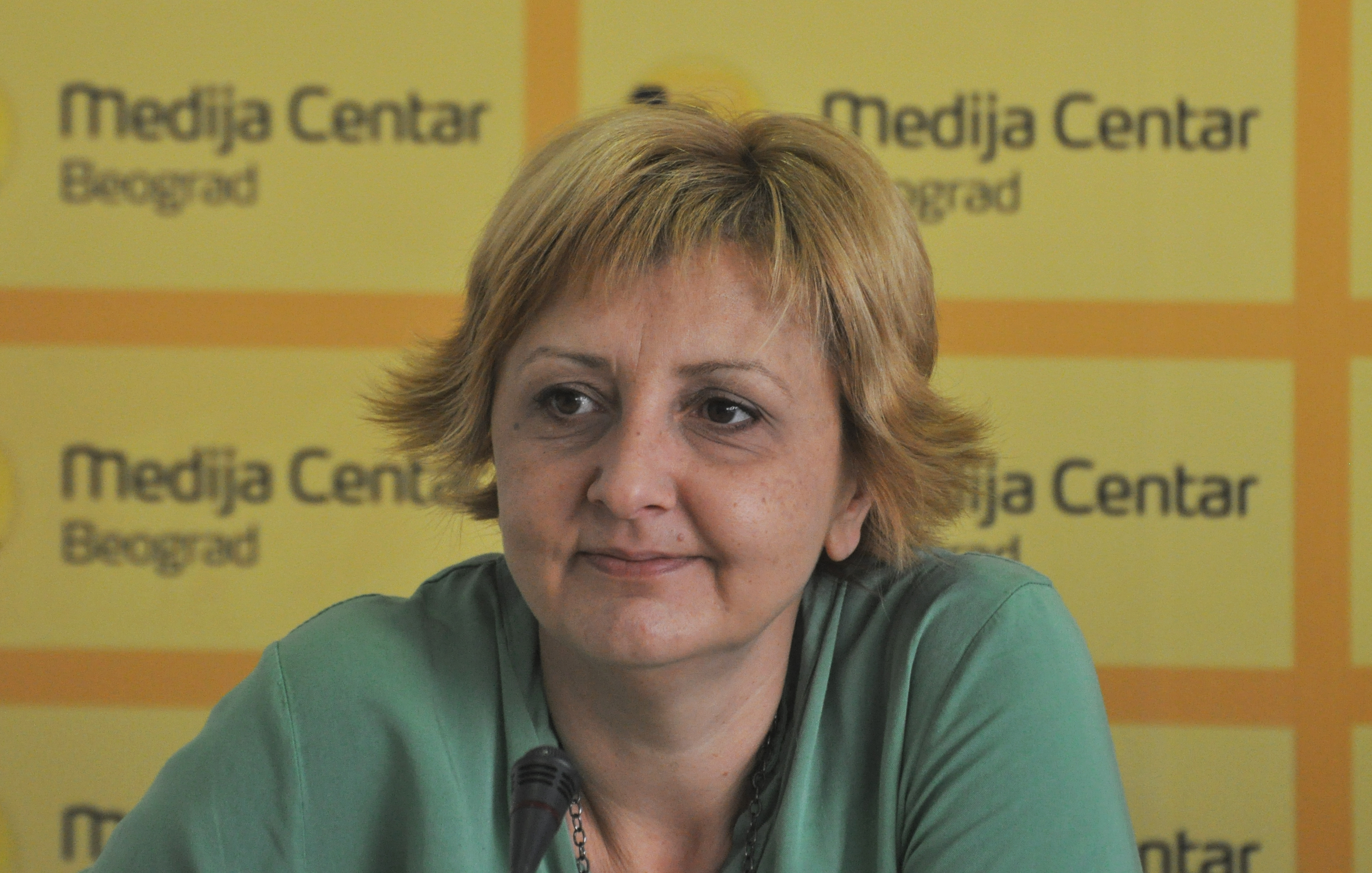
- Stojković in 2019
- Born: 6 October 1972 (age 54); Belgrade, SR Serbia, SFR Yugoslavia
- Education: University of Belgrade (PhD)
- Political party: Together (2022–2024); DS (2024–present)
- Spouse: Oliver Stojković
- Children: 1

Biljana Stojković (Serbian Cyrillic: Биљана Стојковић; born 6 October 1972) is a Serbian biologist, activist, and professor at the University of Belgrade Faculty of Biology. Stojković was the presidential candidate of the We Must coalition in the 2022 Serbian presidential election.

== Early life ==
Stojković was born on 6 October 1972 in Belgrade, SR Serbia, SFR Yugoslavia. She attended the Zemun Gymnasium, and in 1991, she enrolled into the Faculty of Biology at the University of Belgrade. She graduated in 1996, and in 1999 she received her master's degree. At one point, Stojković stayed in Switzerland in 1999, and there, she was offered to finish her postgraduate studies at the University of Basel, although she declined the offer and instead, she finished the studies in Belgrade. She received her PhD in 2007.

== Career ==
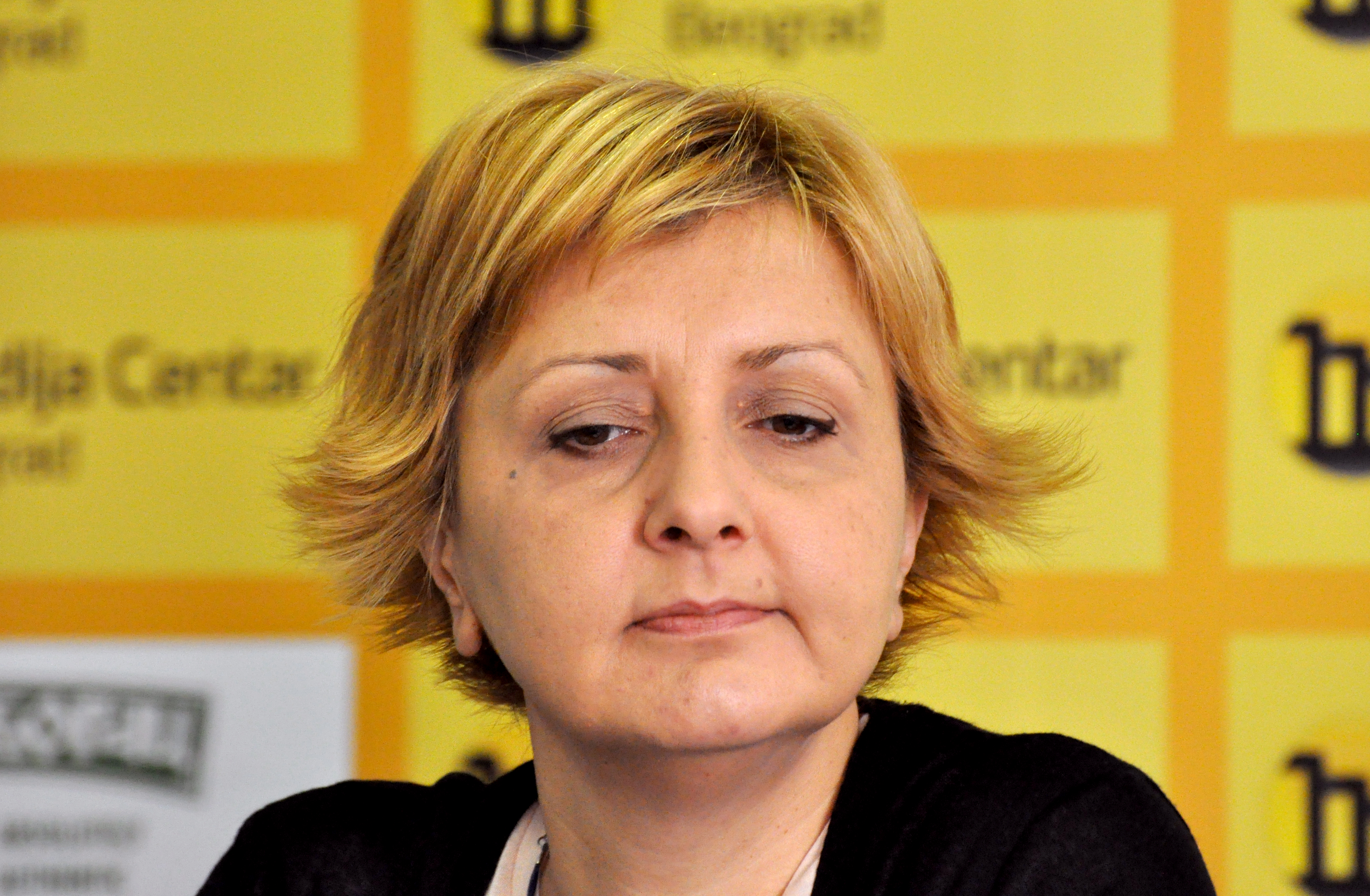
Stojković in 2017

Stojković began her career as an assistant at the University of Belgrade in 1997, a role which she held until 2008. She was promoted to an assistant professor in 2008, and in 2013, she became an associate professor. In 2018, she became a full professor at the university. She teaches genetics and evolution, and at the Faculty of Philosophy, she also teaches genetics as an elective subject. Throughout her career, she has primarily worked on studies regarding genetics and evolution. Stojković gained notoriety as a scientist who has opposed to expel Darwin's theory from school curricula, and she was one of the few professors at the University of Belgrade who publicly supported the student blockade of the rectorate in 2019.

=== Politics ===
Stojković was previously an independent politician, while she describes herself as a secular humanist, and she holds left-wing and anti-war views. She is an opponent of creationism, and she opposes religious studies as part of school curricula. Stojković has criticised the Serbian Progressive Party, and has called Aleksandar Vučić an autocrat. Ahead of the 2022 presidential elections, she claimed that she would not recognize Kosovo as an independent state, nor would she agree to Serbia's membership in NATO as president. She participated in the protests throughout the 1990s, beginning with the 1991 protests in Belgrade. Stojković had also opposed Slobodan Milošević's regime.

She was a member of the Assembly of Free Serbia organisation. The organisation initially cooperated with parties inside the United Serbia coalition, although in early February 2022, the organisation began cooperating with the We Must coalition. On 27 February, the We Must coalition revealed Stojković as their presidential candidate. During the electoral campaign, Stojković stated her opposition to partocracy and support for European integrations. Stojković became one of the co-leaders of the Together political party on 11 June.

== Personal life ==
She is married to Oliver Stojković, a geneticist, and they have one son. Stojković is an author and she has published her work in international science magazines. She has been an editor for Peščanik since 2007. She received the "A Good Example of New Optimism" award in 2019.

== Bibliography ==
- Stojković, Biljana; Tucić, Nikola (2009). Darvinijana (in Serbian). Službeni glasnik. ISBN 9788651902126.
- Stojković, Biljana (2011). Biomass in Evolving World: Individual's Point of View. InTech. ISBN 978-953-307-490-0.
- Stojković, Biljana; Tucić, Nikola (2012). Od molekula do organizma : molekularna i fenotipska evolucija (in Serbian). Službeni glasnik. ISBN 978-8651914082.
- Stojković, Biljana; Lazarević, Jovan; Tucić, Nikola (2013). Sexual Dimorphism in Insect Longevity: Insights from Experimental Evolution. Nova Science Publishers, Inc. ISBN 978-1-62808-806-9.
- Stojković, Biljana (2014). Bezbednost kao preduslov razvoja (in Serbian). Zadužbina Andrejević. ISBN 978-86-525-0164-9.
- Stojković, Biljana; Sayadi, Ahmed; Đorđević, Mirko; Jović, Jelena; Savković, Uroš; Arnqvist, Göran (2016). "Divergent evolution of life span associated with mitochondrial DNA evolution". Evolution. 71. The Society for the Study of Evolution: 160–166. doi:10.1111/evo.13102. PMID 27778315. S2CID 21218813.
- Stojković, Biljana; Šinžar Sekulić, Jasmina. Biologija 4, udžbenik za četvrti razred gimnazije prirodno-matematičkog smera (in Serbian). Klett. ISBN 9788653300227.
