= Nebojša Zelenović =

Serbian politician

- Небојша Зеленовић
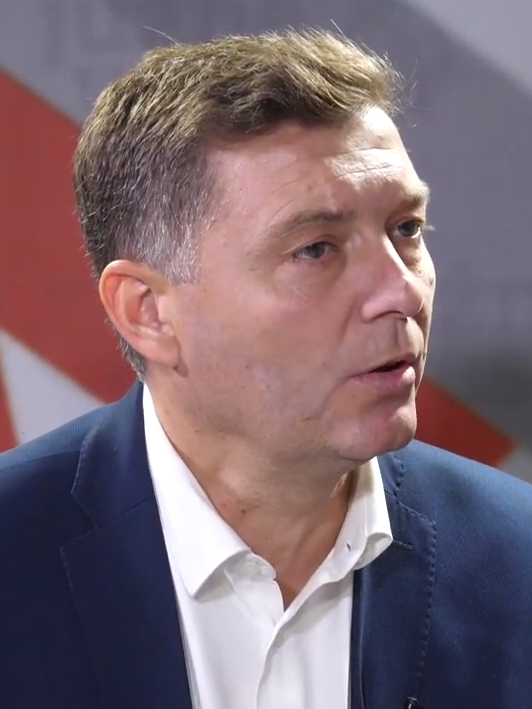
- Zelenović in 2022

Mayor of Šabac
- In office 16 June 2014 – 23 October 2020
- Preceded by: Miloš Milošević
- Succeeded by: Aleksandar Pajić

Personal details
- Born: 15 July 1975 (age 51) Šabac, SR Serbia, SFR Yugoslavia
- Party: DS (1995−2013, 2024–present); ZZS (2013–2022); Together (2022–2024)
- Education: University of Belgrade
- Occupation: Politician
- Website: nebojsazelenovic.rs

Nebojša Zelenović (Serbian Cyrillic: Небојша Зеленовић; born 15 July 1975) is a Serbian politician who served as mayor of Šabac from 2014 to 2020. A former member of the Democratic Party, he presided over the Together for Serbia party from 2016 to 2022, and was a co-leader of the Together party from 2022 to 2024.

== Career ==
Zelenović graduated from The University of Belgrade, Faculty of Law. He was a Member of the National Assembly from 2012 to 2014. He was also a member of the Main Board of the Democratic Party, and at the beginning of 2013 he left the Democratic Party and joined the new parliamentary group Together for Serbia. At the Assembly of the City of Šabac on June 16, 2014, he was elected mayor. He was re-elected mayor of Šabac on May 5, 2016. Zelenović became the president of the Together for Serbia party on July 9, 2016.

He is a co-founder of the Alliance for Serbia, which was officially founded on September 2, 2018.

On February 23, 2020, Zelenović and his party, Together for Serbia, announced that they will participate in the 2020 Serbian parliamentary elections. The next day, Together for Serbia decided to leave the Alliance for Serbia because the Alliance didn't want to support their decision to participate in the elections, while Alliance is boycotting the elections.

After the local elections in Šabac and the repetition three times, he officially lost to the Serbian Progressive Party although he announced that he would not admit defeat and that the votes were invalid. As of October 23, 2020, he is no longer officially the mayor of Šabac, after which he announced a boycott of the city assembly and the expansion of his policy to the state level.
