= Recognition of same-sex unions in Serbia =

Serbia does not recognize any form of legal recognition for same-sex couples. Same-sex marriage is banned by the Constitution of Serbia, which was adopted in 2006 following the dissolution of Serbia and Montenegro. However, there have been discussions in the National Assembly to legalize civil unions.

== Civil unions ==
=== Background ===
Serbia does not recognise civil partnerships (Serbian: грађанско партнерство, građansko partnerstvo, pronounced [ɡrâdʑanskoː pârtnerstvo]) (Note: In some regional languages of Serbia: Albanian: bashkim civil, pronounced [baʃˈkim tsiˈvil]; Bosnian: građansko partnerstvo, грађанско партнерство, pronounced [ɡrâdʑanskoː pârtnerstvo]; Bulgarian: регистрирано партньорство, registrírano partnjórstvo, pronounced [rɛɡiˈstrirɐno ˈpartnjorstvo]; Croatian: građansko partnerstvo, pronounced [ɡrâdʑanskoː pârtnerstvo]; Hungarian: bejegyzett élettársi kapcsolat, pronounced [ˈbɛ.jɛɟzɛtː ˈeːlɛtːaːrʃi ˈkɒptʃolɒt]; Romani: registrime partneripe; Romanian: parteneriat înregistrat, pronounced [parteˈnerjat ɨnreˈdʒistrat]; Rusyn: горожанськоє цимборенє, gorožans'koje tsimborenje; Slovak: registrované partnerstvo, pronounced [ˈreɡistrɔʋaneː ˈpartɲerstʋɔ]) which would offer same-sex couples some of the rights, benefits and obligations of marriage. However, as a member of the Council of Europe, Serbia falls under the jurisdiction of the European Court of Human Rights (ECHR). In January 2023, the Grand Chamber of the European Court of Human Rights ruled in Fedotova and Others v. Russia that Article 8 of the European Convention on Human Rights, which guarantees a right to private and family life, imposes a positive obligation on all member states of the Council of Europe to establish a legal framework recognising same-sex unions. The court later issued similar rulings with respect to Poland in Przybyszewska and Others, Romania in Buhuceanu and Others, Bulgaria in Koilova and Babulkova, and Ukraine in Maymulakhin and Markiv.

In January 2011, the Ministry of Foreign Affairs gave permission to the British embassy in Belgrade to conduct civil partnership ceremonies between two British citizens or a British citizen and a non-Serbian national. The French embassy in Belgrade also offers civil solidarity pacts to French citizens and their foreign partners.

=== Failed attempts in 2010–2019 ===
Laws regarding same-sex partnerships in Europe¹ Marriage Civil union Limited domestic recognition (cohabitation) Unrecognized Constitution limits marriage to opposite-sex couples ¹ May include recent laws or court decisions that have not yet entered into effect.

A draft civil union bill was first proposed in 2010 by several local activists, but it was not successful. In May 2013, it was announced that a draft law on same-sex unions would be introduced to the National Assembly on 4 June. The law would have allowed hospital visitation and inheritance rights for same-sex partners, although it was unknown whether this would be in the form of unregistered cohabitation or registered partnerships. The draft bill stalled and was never voted on.

In June 2019, plans were announced to amend the Civil Code to allow domestic partnerships between same-sex couples, providing some of the legal rights of marriage, including property rights and alimony. However, partners would not have been able to inherit, adopt or access fertility treatments. A month later, a lesbian couple from Novi Sad, Jelena Dubović and Sunčica Kopunović, launched a legal challenge to establish legal recognition for same-sex couples.

=== Developments in 2020–present ===
In November 2020, the Minister for Human and Minority Rights and Social Dialogue, Gordana Čomić, announced that a law on same-sex partnerships would be brought before Parliament in the first half of 2021. The draft law was presented for public consultation in February 2021. In May 2021, President Aleksandar Vučić said he would veto the bill if it were approved by the National Assembly: "I don't know what the Assembly is planning when it comes to the law on same-sex unions. But, as the President of Serbia, I am obliged to protect the Constitution and I cannot sign that law." Čomić responded that the bill did not modify the institution of marriage, but instead dealt with issues such as hospital visitation and inheritance rights. Marko Mihailović, the director of Belgrade Pride, said, "We think that it is quite strange that the President of Serbia, who also holds a law degree, raises the issue of the unconstitutionality of the law, which is absolutely not true. This law cannot be unconstitutional because this is not a law on same-sex marriage." Čomić announced in January 2022 that a final version of the bill had been completed. The Movement of Free Citizens and Don't Let Belgrade Drown expressed support for the measure. Dveri and the Serbian Radical Party opposed the bill, as did Vuk Jeremić of the People's Party. Enough is Enough said it opposed the law but that "LGBT people should enjoy all the rights like other citizens of Serbia", while the Democratic Alliance of Croats in Vojvodina stated that its support for the law would "depend on the content".

However, progress on the bill was delayed due to the April 2022 elections and a lack of political will, and it was eventually not voted on. Tristan Flesenkemper, the head of the office of the Council of Europe in Belgrade, said that the law would have "chang[ed] the lives of people in Serbia for the better" and responded to the delay by stating, "To make a real change, it's necessary to have a strong political will and dedication, that will turn it into strong legislature that won't be just passed, but implemented too." The bill was also supported by more than 1,000 academics, psychologists, sociologists, journalists and academics, as well as the Psychological Society of Serbia, who issued a joint statement that "the legal recognition of same-sex unions is associated with a reduction in stress, depressive and anxiety symptoms, and other mental health problems such as suicide."

A new draft partnership bill was introduced to the National Assembly on 3 September 2024 by members of the Green–Left Front, including Biljana Đorđević, Jelena Jerinić, Robert Kozma, Radomir Lazović, Bogdan Radovanović and Dobrica Veselinović. The bill aims to legally regulate the union of two persons of the same sex by introducing a range of rights and obligations previously reserved for married couples, such as partner maintenance, inheritance, compensation for damages, tax deduction, rights during criminal proceedings, rights in case of illness, and rights from pension, health and social insurance. Activists called for the legalization of same-sex civil unions at Belgrade Pride in September 2026.

== Same-sex marriage ==
=== Constitutional ban ===
Article 62 of the Constitution of Serbia, adopted in 2006 after the dissolution of Serbia and Montenegro, states: "Marriage shall be entered into based on the free consent of man and woman before the state body." (Note: Serbian: Брак се закључује на основу слободно датог пристанка мушкарца и жене пред државним органом., Brak se zaključuje na osnovu slobodno datog pristanka muškarca i žene pred državnim organom.) The wording has been interpreted as banning same-sex marriage.

In November 2015, former President Boris Tadić expressed his support for same-sex marriage and adoption by same-sex couples.

=== Religious performance ===
The Serbian Orthodox Church opposes same-sex marriage and partnerships, and does not allow clergy to bless or perform such marriages. In 2021, Patriarch Porfirije stated that he "understands that people with that type of sexual orientation have countless administrative problems, challenges, pressures, and sometimes even the need to regulate their own status".

== Public opinion ==
A 2020 opinion poll published by the Civil Rights Defenders showed that 73% of Serbs supported hospital visitation rights for same-sex couples, 60% supported health insurance for same-sex partners, 59% supported allowing same-sex partners to inherit each other's assets at death, and 59% supported equal division of property. In total, 80% of Serbians supported granting same-sex couples some legal rights. 26% of respondents supported same-sex marriage, an increase from 11% in 2015.

A December 2022 Ipsos survey showed that 24% of Serbs considered same-sex marriage "acceptable" (10% "completely" and 14% "mainly"), while 73% considered it "unacceptable" (56% "completely" and 17% "mainly"). This represented a large increase of support from 2015 when 9% of Serbs supported same-sex marriage. With regard to specific rights, 59% of respondents supported the right of same-sex couples to receive survivor pension benefits in case of the partner's death.

== See also ==
- LGBT rights in Serbia
- Recognition of same-sex unions in Europe
