= Serbian protests =

Serbian protests may refer to:

- 1988–1989 Anti-bureaucratic revolution
- 1991 protests in Belgrade
- 1991–1992 anti-war protests in Belgrade
- 1996–1997 Serbian protests
- 2000 overthrow of Slobodan Milošević
- 2008 protests against Kosovo declaration of independence
- 2016 Serbian protests
- 2017 Serbian protests
- 2018–2020 Serbian protests
- 2020–2022 Serbian protests
- 2021–2022 Serbian environmental protests
- 2023 Serbian protests
- 2023 Serbian election protests
- 2024 Serbian environmental protests
- 2024–present Serbian anti-corruption protests
