= Radomir Lazović =

Serbian politician and activist (born 1980)

- Радомир Лазовић
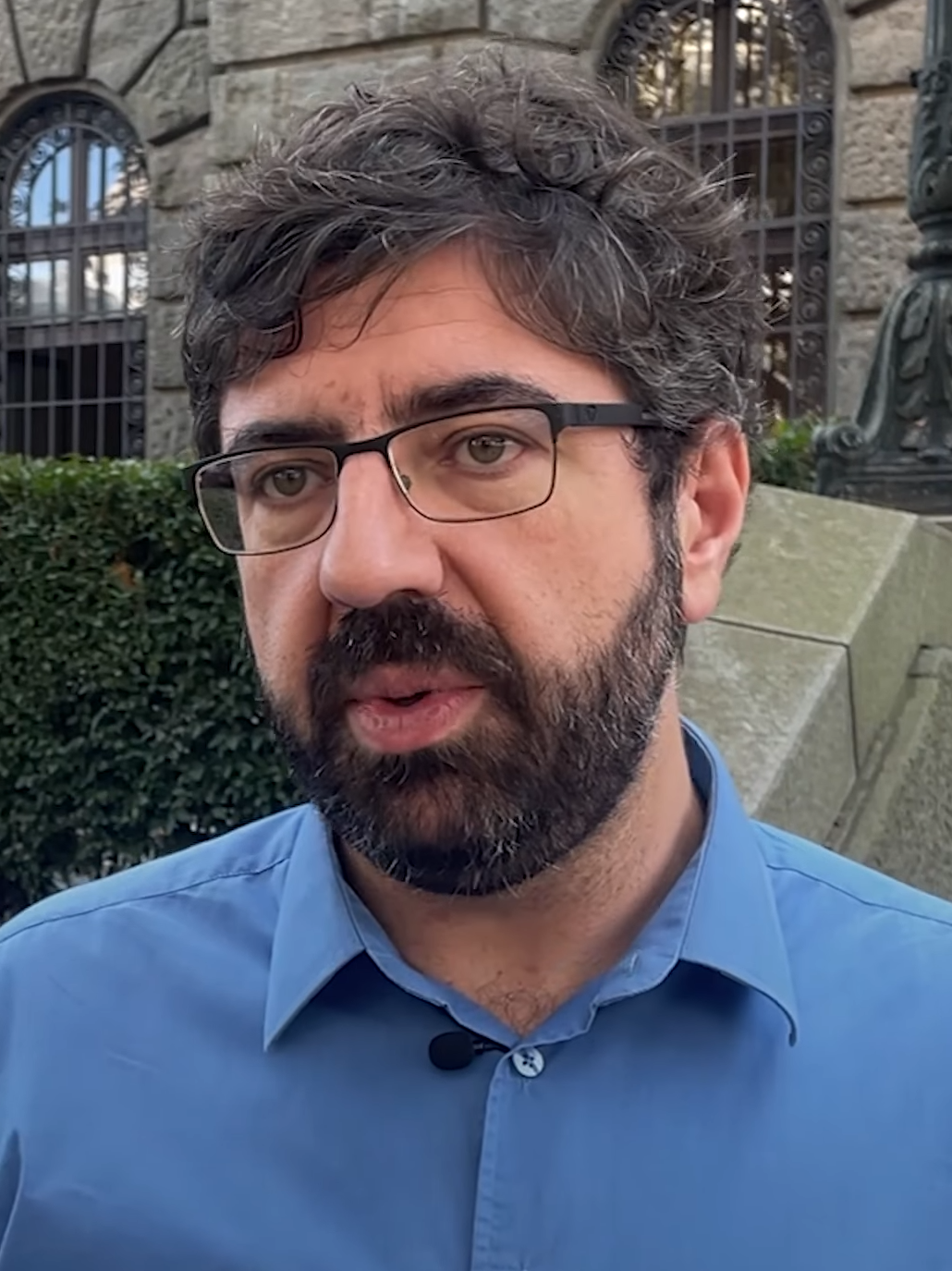
- Lazović in 2023

Member of the National Assembly
- In office 1 August 2022 – 17 November 2026

Personal details
- Born: 1980 (age 45–46) Belgrade, SR Serbia, SFR Yugoslavia
- Party: NDB (until 2023); ZLF (since 2023)
- Occupation: Politician; activist
- Profession: Designer
- Nickname: Mika
- Other offices: 2020–2023: Member of the Minor Council of NDB; 2022–2026: President of the NDB/ZLF parliamentary group; 2023–present: Co-president of ZLF

Radomir Lazović (Serbian Cyrillic: Радомир Лазовић; born 1980) is a Serbian activist, politician, and designer. A co-president of the Green–Left Front (ZLF), he has served as a member of the National Assembly of Serbia from 2022 to 2026.

Born in Belgrade, he studied at the Ninth Belgrade Gymnasium and the University of Belgrade. As a designer, art and technical director, Lazović was involved in the art and civil society scene from 2010 to 2018. He co-founded and led initiatives such as Street Gallery, with whom he organised art exhibitions, and Ministry of Space, where he dealt with urban and cultural policies of Belgrade. A member of the board of directors of the Association of the Independent Cultural Scene of Serbia from 2013 to 2015, he served as its president from 2015 to 2017.

Lazović formally entered politics in 2014, as an activist of the Do not let Belgrade drown (NDB) initiative, which was opposed to the Belgrade Waterfront project and organised several protests against it, beginning in 2015. After the demolition of private property in Savamala, he participated in mass protests from May to October 2016. He was a candidate in the 2018 Belgrade City Assembly election, although NDB failed to win any seats. NDB boycotted the 2020 parliamentary election, claiming that the election would not be fair, and later that year, he was elected a member of the Minor Council of NDB. He later took part in the environmental protests in 2021 and early 2022, becoming one of the main figures of the protests. Lazović was the candidate of the We Must alliance for the 2022 parliamentary election. He campaigned on environmentalist, anti-corruption, and anti-economic inequality policies. He was successfully elected, becoming a member of the National Assembly on 1 August and the president of the NDB parliamentary group. NDB was transformed into ZLF, a political party, in July 2023. He was re-elected to the National Assembly in the 2023 parliamentary election.

A critic of Aleksandar Vučić and Serbian Progressive Party's approach towards the environment, Lazović has denounced the far-right, criticised neoliberalism, the Anglo-Australian mining company Rio Tinto, and has supported workers rights. On foreign policy, he supports the accession of Serbia to the European Union, aligning Serbia's foreign policies with the European Union, and implementing sanctions against Russia due to its invasion of Ukraine. He co-wrote a book named Dnevnik borbe za naš grad in 2020.

== Early life and education ==
Radomir Lazović was born in 1980 in New Belgrade, a Belgrade municipality, SR Serbia, SFR Yugoslavia. He grew up in a low-income family; his mother was a professor. He studied at the Ninth Belgrade Gymnasium and the Faculty of Agriculture of the University of Belgrade. After beginning his studies at the University of Belgrade, Lazović worked as an assistant on a construction site and then as a worker in a printing shop. He did not finish his studies at the University of Belgrade. In his youth he played basketball.

== Career ==
=== Art and civil society career (2010–2018) ===
Lazović was an active participant in the Belgrade art scene since 2010, when he co-founded the "Street Gallery" initiative to be involved in "engaged art". According to him, the exhibitions organised by the Street Gallery initiative occur every three weeks on average. Their first "illegal" exhibition was held in 2010, although the official opening was organised in April 2012. He co-founded the Ministry of Space collective in 2010, in which he mainly dealt with urban and cultural policies of Belgrade. The Ministry of Space took part in reviving the "Zvezda" cinema in December 2014. Lazović was one of the organisers of the 2015 Transeuropa Festival in Belgrade. He was also a member of the board of directors of the Association of the Independent Cultural Scene of Serbia from 2013 to 2015, and its president from 2015 to 2017.

Additionally, Lazović has also led the "Micro Art" non-governmental organisation, which showcases art in public spaces. He took part in a 2011 fair it organised. Lazović wrote the screenplay for Flirting, a short feature film made by Micro Art in 2012. As a member of the informal group, "Cinemas – the return of the written off", he had organised the re-opening of several abandoned cinemas in Belgrade in 2014. He took part in the Occupied Cinema movie in 2018. Lazović also co-founded and led the "Micro Amateur Film Festival" and "Inex Film" collectives. According to Monocle, he has travelled across Serbia "with workshops, encouraging young Serbs to claim spaces for their own projects". After formally entering electoral politics in 2018, his art and civil society career ended.

=== Early political career (2014–2018) ===
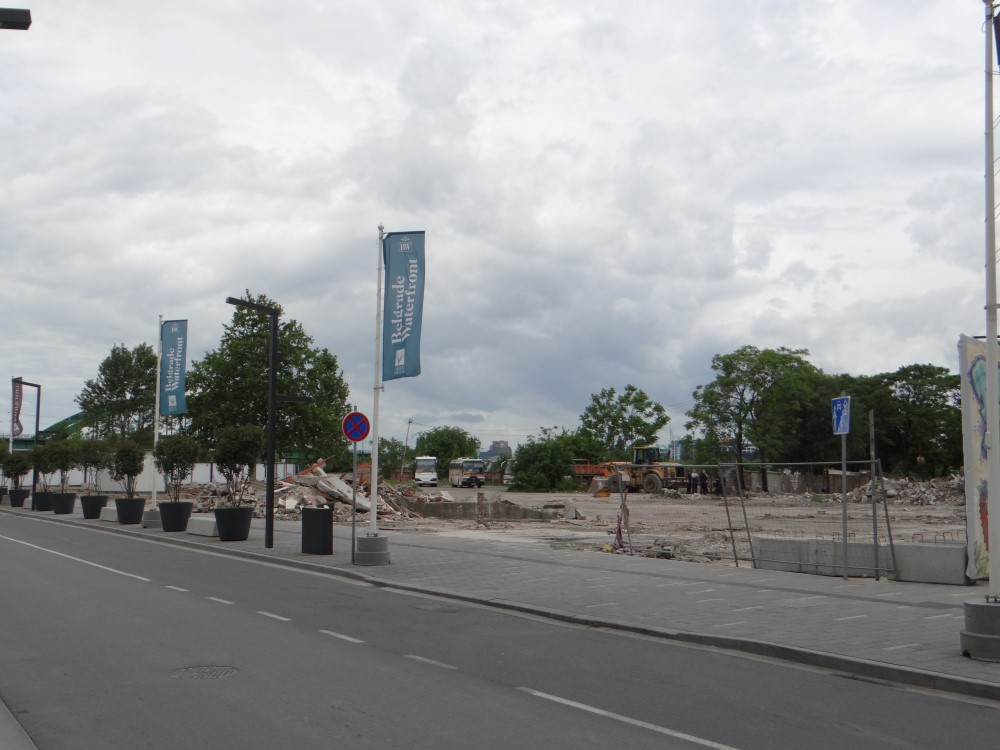
Lazović has opposed the construction of the Belgrade Waterfront project. This image shows the location of buildings that were demolished in 2016.

Together with other Ministry of Space activists, in 2014 Lazović co-founded Do not let Belgrade d(r)own (NDB), a left-wing initiative, to oppose the Belgrade Waterfront project. He described the initiative as a "coalition of organizations and individuals who are interested into the development of Belgrade" which opposed "shady deals made by investors and politicians for their self-interests". Along with Dobrica Veselinović and other members of NDB, he protested inside the City Assembly of Belgrade following the adoption of the amendments to the General Urban Plan for Belgrade in September 2014. At a protest outside the building of the National Assembly in April 2015, he and other activists held a giant rubber duck. In Serbian, duck (patka) is a slang term for fraud. Lazović said the duck symbolised the project itself and lex specialis, which was adopted shortly prior in the National Assembly and expanded the legal structure of the Belgrade Waterfront project: "a big scam, or a duck that we must not fall for". He added that "a duck is the symbol of fraud, but also of resistance to arrogance and arbitrariness". He continued to take part in protests organised by NDB after July 2015.

As an experiment, later that year he tried to buy an apartment in the Belgrade Waterfront complex. In December 2015, Lazović and Veselinović were tried in Misdemeanor Court after allegedly violating the Law on Citizens' Gatherings. Following the demolition of private property in Savamala, NDB began organising protests in May 2016. Lazović took part in the protests NDB organised through late October. The tabloid newspaper Informer, and television channels Pink and Studio B, attacked Lazović and other organisers during the protests. During a protest-related interview in June 2016, he said "we have to find a way to marginalize professional politicians" and to put "people before profit". Initially, several thousand demonstrators took part in the protests, and the number of demonstrators later grew to around 15,000. In a February 2017 interview, he added that "when the protests get bigger, they get terribly afraid and do even worse things". He also took part in the April 2017 series of protests over that year's presidential election.

A month later, Lazović organised and held a public discussion regarding NDB's plans with Veselinović. Lazović announced in August 2017 that NDB would take part in the 2018 Belgrade City Assembly election, but would not seek partnerships with existing political parties. In October 2017, he criticised Dragan Đilas and declined to cooperate with the Democratic Party (DS). Instead, Lazović stated that NDB would work with local initiatives. Shortly before the election, he was detained by the police after spray painting "crime scene" in Hercegovačka street in Savamala. Former Ombudsman Saša Janković, leader of the Movement of Free Citizens (PSG), condemned his detention, while Lazović said he "did not know on what basis was he detained". He was placed third on the NDB ballot list, although it only won 3.4 per cent of the popular vote, not enough to win any seats. Following the election, Lazović stated that NDB achieved the results under "very difficult conditions ... [we] cannot be dissatisfied". "Nothing will change even after the election of Zoran Radojičić as mayor", he said. Lazović emphasised the formation of a "civic front" after the election, saying he was convinced that "a strong left-wing option would be able to enter the scene". He later took part in a series of mass anti-government protests which began in November 2018.

=== Opposition activities (2019–2021) ===
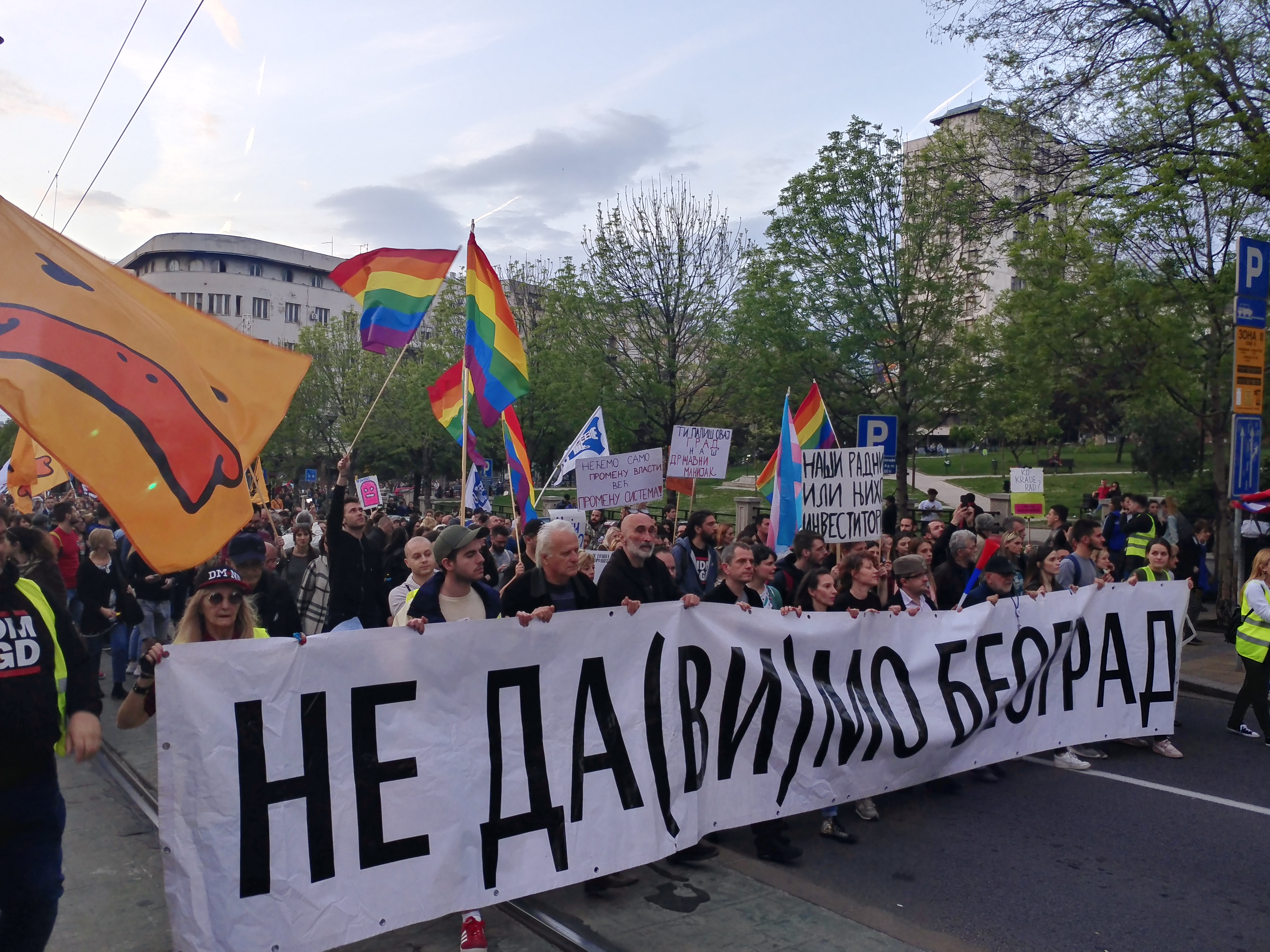
Since the formation of Do not let Belgrade drown in 2014, Lazović has organised and took part in several of its protests

Together with two local organisations from Niš and Kraljevo, NDB announced the formation of the "Civic Front" in February 2019. Lazović stated that the front would gather people around "the fight against poverty", but he did not want it to be a part of the Alliance for Serbia coalition. He received a notice from the police in July 2019 about having allegedly violating the Law on Public Assembly in 2016, which he described as "political". During an interview he said that he would pay the fine.

Lazović took part in the 2019 Belgrade Pride event; he wanted to hand Prime Minister Ana Brnabić a rubber duck, the symbol of NDB, but she refused to accept it. In October, he announced that NDB would boycott the 2020 parliamentary election, claiming that the conditions were not fair. Later he claimed that the government would fake voter turnout. In January and February 2020, Lazović, as the representative of NDB, took part in protests for clean air. After the start of the COVID-19 pandemic, he took part in the "Noise Against the Dictatorship" protests that NDB organised. He also criticised the government's approach to the pandemic. Following the 2020 parliamentary election, he proclaimed that "the boycott absolutely succeeded". Lazović condemned the violence that occurred during series of violent protests in Belgrade after the election.

In October 2020, Lazović was elected a member of NDB's Minor Council. A day later, he took part in a debate with opposition political figures Marinika Tepić, Pavle Grbović, Nebojša Zelenović, and Jovo Bakić. In December 2020, Lazović stated his support for cooperating with other opposition parties regarding electoral conditions. He had also said NDB would take part in inter-party dialogues on electoral conditions with delegators from the European Union. During those dialogues in 2021, Lazović supported separate election dates. Lazović expressed his support for the formation of several ideological blocs for the 2022 Belgrade City Assembly election in February 2021. In July, he revealed to the public that NDB had been in contact with Aleksandar Jovanović Ćuta, a prominent environmental activist. He also added that pre-election cooperation with Zelenović would be also possible.

Lazović took part in an environmental protest in Loznica in late July, shortly before the beginning of the environmental protests in September 2021. Together with activists from NDB, Lazović reported in early August 2021 that a fire erupted in Vinča. Shortly after, Informer, Alo!, and Pink claimed that Lazović and other NDB activists were the ones who started the fire. Lazović denied the claims, stating that he received reports from citizens, and that "firefighters were also present in the area". A few days later, he announced that NDB had received support from the European Green Party, as well as from the Croatian eco-socialist We Can and Montenegrin green United Reform Action political parties. Lazović took part in organised environmental protests from September through February 2022. He again condemned the violence that took place during those protests.

In late September 2021, Lazović and Zelenović presented a proposal for cooperation between the opposition parties, which also included the formation of ideological blocs for the next year's general election, something Lazović had previously proposed. A month later, Lazović announced that NDB would take part in that election; he also endorsed Veselinović as the candidate for mayor of Belgrade. By then, the media had begun labelling the coalition between Ćuta, Lazović, and Zelenović as the "green-left" bloc. In late December 2021, Lazović opposed the next month's constitutional referendum.

=== 2022 election and aftermath (2022–present) ===
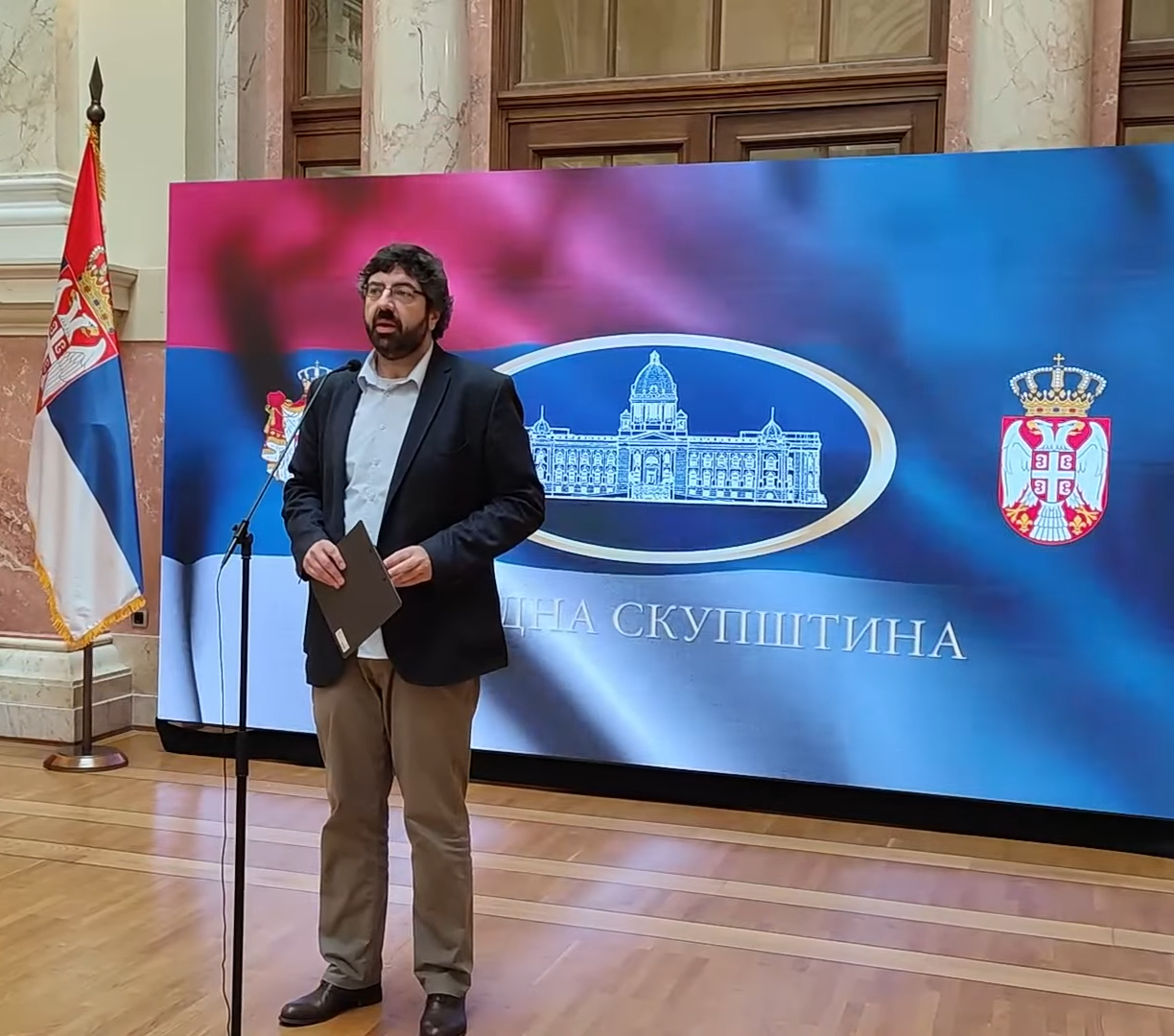
Lazović was elected to the National Assembly of Serbia in 2022

The "green-left" bloc was formalised in January 2022 under the name We Must. Lazović supported the nomination of a joint opposition candidate for the presidential election, although he expressed his dissatisfaction on the political talk show Utisak nedelje saying other parties did not respond to requests to discuss the issue. A month later, the We Must coalition nominated Biljana Stojković. Lazović described Zdravko Ponoš, the United for the Victory of Serbia coalition-nominated presidential candidate, as the candidate of "right-wingers". Lazović took part in the We Must election campaign, during which he emphasised non-aggressive tactics towards other opposition parties. He campaigned on an environmentalist, anti-corruption, and anti-economic inequality platform. He also took part in debates organised by the Radio Television of Serbia. Lazović was placed sixth on the We Must ballot list for the parliamentary election, and was also a candidate in the 2022 Belgrade City Assembly election. The We Must coalition won 4.7 per cent of the popular vote and 13 seats in the National Assembly, guaranteeing him a seat. A day after the election, Lazović participated in a protest outside the building of the Republic Electoral Commission (RIK). He was also elected to the City Assembly of Belgrade, but resigned in June.

Following the election, he criticised Vučić's response to the inconclusive outcome of the City Assembly election. He also criticised Vučić for meeting with Đilas, the leader of Party of Freedom and Justice (SSP). A dispute in the We Must coalition regarding its name emerged in June; NDB claimed it as its intellectual property, although it withdrew the request that it sent to the Intellectual Property Office. Lazović said it would be property of the coalition and not NDB. At the end of the month, he gave a speech in the European Parliament, in which he criticised the Serbian government's policies on environment, quality of life, and the rule of law. A month later, he was attacked during an environmental protest in Novi Sad. Lazović was sworn in as member of the National Assembly in August; he also became president of the NDB parliamentary group. During his first term as a member of the National Assembly, Lazović was one of the most active opposition members.

Lazović declared that NDB would remain in opposition to SNS. He announced the re-formation of NDB in September 2022, stating that it would adopt a new name and work on to become a registered political party. In October and November 2022, Srpski telegraf, a tabloid associated with SNS, published articles with unsubstantiated text that were targeted against Lazović and his father who died in 2021; the Press Council of Serbia later concluded that Srpski telegraf violated the code of journalism with these articles. In March 2023, Lazović took part in a protest against the allegedly illegal digging of the Sava embankment in New Belgrade, while since May 2023 he has taken part in the mass Serbia Against Violence protests, which were triggered after the Belgrade school shooting and Mladenovac and Smederevo shootings.

NDB, together with four local citizens' groups, was officially transformed into the Green–Left Front (ZLF) on 14 July 2023. As the president of the ZLF parliamentary group, he was one of the signatories of the Agreement for Victory document in September 2023, in which ZLF and other parties that have organised the Serbia Against Violence protests pledged to cooperate together. In preparations for the December 2023 parliamentary election, ZLF and other parties organising the Serbia Against Violence protests formed the namesake coalition in October 2023. It was announced that Lazović would be featured first on the coalition's electoral list and that for the Belgrade City Assembly election ZLF would receive the most candidates. Lazović was elected as one of the co-presidents of ZLF on 5 November. Lazović was one of the main representatives of the Serbia Against Violence coalition during the 2023 election campaign. As SPN won 65 seats in the National Assembly, Lazović was re-elected tantamount to election. Once the 14th National Assembly of Serbia was constituted in February 2024, he again became the president of the ZLF parliamentary group.

== Political positions ==
Lazović is a long-time critic of the Belgrade Waterfront project, which he calls "completely harmful ... to the public interest", and "non-transparent and against the law"; he also called for the termination of the investment contract. He said that "the aim of the project is to fill the pockets of individuals close to the government". In January 2020, he opposed moving the Old Sava Bridge to Ušće, a Belgrade neighbourhood. A year later, Lazović said the Stefan Nemanja statue should be moved to somewhere to be determined by experts. The Stefan Nemanja statue previously received mixed responses regarding its location of placement, as it was put in front of the former Belgrade Main railway station building, which was closed due to the Belgrade Waterfront project in 2018. He supports public-run transport and opposed the "BusPlus" system. He has criticised the Serbian Progressive Party-led government as authoritarian; he has criticised its environmental policy and response to the 2023 mass shootings. Additionally, he has criticised SNS politicians Vučić, Nebojša Stefanović, and Goran Vesić.

Lazović opposes far-right and anti-immigration politics. He had also stated that he would not "flirt with parties on the right" or with "nationalism and chauvinism". He opposed joining the Alliance for Serbia (SzS) and United Opposition of Serbia (UOPS). He also opposed creation of pre-election coalitions. He later supported the cooperation between NDB and Together for Serbia, a party led by Nebojša Zelenović. He supported the candidacies of N1 and Nova S television channels during the national frequency addition in August 2022.

Lazović supports the accession of Serbia to the European Union (EU), and aligning Serbian foreign policy with the EU's. A critic of neoliberalism, he also stated that he wants the European Union to be based on social justice, municipalism, equality, and solidarity. Lazović supported the EuroPride demonstration in September 2022, citing his support for equal rights for all. He has also criticised Rio Tinto, an Anglo-Australian mining corporation operating in Serbia, and "investor urban planning". He supports workers rights. After the beginning of the 2022 Russian invasion of Ukraine, Lazović took part in several protests supporting Ukraine in Belgrade. He also supports the implementation of sanctions against Russia. Regarding the political status of Kosovo, Lazović favours reconciliation between Serbs and Albanians and supports the rights of Serbs in Kosovo. Lazović has described Croatia as "Serbia's most natural partner", saying that "the stronger these ties were, the better we lived". Al Jazeera journalist Goran Mišić compared Lazović's rhetoric with that of the mayor of Zagreb, Tomislav Tomašević.

== Personal life ==
By profession, Lazović is a designer and he previously worked as an art and technical director for several magazines. He is a fan of underground music and punk rock, in particular The Clash. He owns a cat named Ljubica.

Lazović has asthma; he was ridiculed by Milenko Jovanov, the parliamentary leader of SNS, in February 2023 because of using an inhaler in the National Assembly. His nickname is Mika, which is used by his close friends. He previously wrote Dnevnik borbe za naš grad (The Diary of the Fight for Our City) articles for newspaper Danas.

== Bibliography ==
- Lazović, Radomir; Vuković, Vjekoslav (2020). Dnevnik borbe za naš grad (in Serbian). Belgrade: Kontrast izdavaštvo. ISBN 978-86-6036-066-5.
