= Milan Turanjanin =

Serbian politician

- Милан Турањанин

Member of the Assembly of Vojvodina
- Incumbent
- Assumed office 9 February 2024

Personal details
- Born: 1976 (age 49–50) Nova Pazova, Stara Pazova, SAP Vojvodina, SR Serbia, SFR Yugoslavia
- Party: ZLF

Milan Turanjanin (Serbian Cyrillic: Милан Турањанин; born 1976) is a Serbian politician. He has served in the Vojvodina provincial assembly since February 2024 as a member of the Green–Left Front (ZLF).

== Early life and career ==
Turanjanin was born in the community of Nova Pazova in the municipality of Stara Pazova, in what was then the Socialist Autonomous Province of Vojvodina in the Socialist Republic of Serbia, Socialist Federal Republic of Yugoslavia. He graduated from the Secondary School of Mechanical Engineering in 1994 and completed the Engineering Management program in 2017. He is the founder of MV Hidraulik.

== Politician ==
Turanjanin was a founder of the Choice for Our Municipality (Serbian: Izbor za našu opštinu) movement in 2015, advocating for Nova Pazova to become a separate municipality. He appeared in the lead position on the movement's electoral list for the 2016 Serbian local elections in Stara Pazova and was elected when the list won four seats. The Serbian Progressive Party (SNS) and its allies won a majority victory, and Choice for Our Municipality served in opposition in the local assembly. In 2017, Turanjanin accused the SNS of unfairly blocking Choice for Our Municipality from taking part in community council elections in Nova Pazova.

He again led the Choice for Our Municipality list in the 2020 Serbian local elections in Stara Pazova and was re-elected when the list again won four seats. The Progressives and their allies again won a majority victory.

In 2021, Turanjanin led Choice for Our Municipality into an alliance with Do not let Belgrade drown (NDB). The latter party contested the 2022 Serbian parliamentary election as part of the We Must (Moramo) coalition. Turanjanin was given the twenty-first position on the coalition's list and was not elected when it won thirteen seats. In July 2023, Do not let Belgrade drown joined with Choice for Our Municipality and other local political movements to create the Green–Left Front as an official party.

The Green–Left Front contested the 2023 Serbian parliamentary election as part of the multi-party Serbia Against Violence coalition. Turanjanin appeared in the 108th position on the coalition's list and was again not elected when the list won sixty-five seats. He also received the fifteenth position on the SPN list in the concurrent 2023 Vojvodina provincial election, however, and was elected when the list won thirty seats. The Progressives and their allies won a majority government, and the delegates elected on the SPN list serve in opposition.

Turanjanin is now part of a provincial assembly group that includes the ZLF, Serbia Centre (SRCE), and the Movement for Reversal (PZP). He is the president of the assembly committee on European integration and interregional cooperation and a member of the committee on security.

The ZLF contested the 2024 Serbian local elections in Stara Pazova on a coalition opposition list called It Is Possible. Turanjanin appeared in the twenty-seven position out of the thirty on the list. Election from this position was not a realistic prospect, and he was not re-elected at the local level when the list won six seats.

Turanjanin played a prominent role in opposition protests in Vojvodina following the Novi Sad railway station canopy collapse on 1 November 2024. On one occasion, he said that riot police acted "furiously" against protesters and that elected representatives from the opposition were "kicked and pushed with shields, and punched."
