= 2016 Serbian protests =

- Part of 2016 Serbian parliamentary election
- Date: 30 April 2016 – 18 July 2016
- Location: Serbia: Belgrade; Novi Sad
- Caused by: Alleged electoral fraud; Demolition of Savamala; Belgrade Waterfront project; Autocracy; Death of Slobodan Tanasković; Lack of media freedom; Allegations of government corruption and money laundering; Change of general director of Radio Television of Vojvodina
- Goals: Organization of new free and fair elections; Resignation of senior government officials responsible for Savamala demolitions; Freedom of media
- Methods: Peaceful protests and demonstrations
- Result: Protests failed

Parties
Do not let Belgrade d(r)own; Opposition parties: Liberal Democratic Party; Enough is Enough; Dveri; Democratic Party of Serbia	Government of Serbia; Police; Counter-protestors

Lead figures
Leaders of Opposition parties: Dobrica Veselinović; Boško Obradović; Saša Radulović; Čedomir Jovanović; Sanda Rašković Ivić	Aleksandar Vučić: Siniša Mali

Number
25,000	unknown

Casualties
- Injuries: 1 policeman

The 2016 Serbian protests were a series of peaceful demonstrations that started over the demolition in Savamala and accusations of electoral fraud in 2016 elections.

== Cause of the protest ==
=== Savamala demolition ===
On election night of between 24 and 25 April 2016 around 30 people wearing balaclavas came with bulldozers and demolished private objects in Savamala, urban neighborhood in Belgrade. Police did not respond to multiple calls of people whose objects were demolished during the night, police didn't address this issue until 30 April when minister of interior Nebojša Stefanović announced that the demolition will be investigated. Buildings that were demolished were in zone of controversial Belgrade waterfront building project. This lead public to assume that demolition was carried out by the government and sparked anti-government protests. Protestors demanded resignation of top government officials involved in the demolition, government officials whose resignation was demanded by the protestors are: Mayor of Belgrade Siniša Mali, Interior Minister Nebojša Stefanović, the President of the Belgrade City Assembly, Nicholas Nikodijevic, and acting Belgrade police chief Vladimir Rebić.

=== Alleged fraud in parliamentary elections ===
Opposition parties have accused ruling Serbian Progressive Party of electoral fraud in 2016 parliamentary elections. They claimed that ruling party made votes of people who died, and that not all votes for opposition have been counted.

=== Death of Slobodan Tanasković ===
Slobodan Tanasković was a guard of one of the objects on the night of demolition of Savamala. His personal documents were taken from him by the men in balaclavas and he was threatened with death on that night. According to his friends he was taken to the hospital in pre-infarction state. He later died in the hospital but the cause of dead wasn't revealed. Minister of Health Zlatibor Lončar announced that no harm was done to Slobodan after accusations that doctors didn't treat him well on purpose because he was one of the key witnesses.

== Timeline ==
=== April ===
On 30 April first protest is organized by main opposition parties whose leaders gave speeches on the protests. Sanda Rašković Ivić, leader of Democratic Party of Serbia said that with Vučić in power Serbia is slowly becoming like North Korea. Protest was attended by few thousands, police did not give an official estimate.

=== May ===
On 11 May, civic movement Do not let Belgrade d(r)own organized the protest which was also attended by the opposition leaders. Protestors demanded resignation of government officials that have been accused of organizing the demolition of Savamala. Those being: Mayor of Belgrade Siniša Mali, Interior Minister Nebojša Stefanović, the President of the Belgrade City Assembly, Nicholas Nikodijevic, and acting Belgrade police chief Vladimir Rebić.

On 14 May, Democratic Party of Serbia organized protests, they like Do not let Belgrade d(r)own, demanded explanation who were people in balaclavas who demolished Savamala, and who sent them.

On 25 May, civic movement Do not let Belgrade d(r)own again organized protest, spokesperson of the movement Dobrica Veselinović said that they won't work together with opposition leaders despite them showing up on their protests. Protestors also demanded clarification on death of guard from Savamala, Slobodan Tanasković who died in a hospital.

=== June ===
On 15 June, few anti-government organizations staged a protest in Novi Sad because of change of general director of Radio Television of Vojvodina who was considered politically independent with one placed by the ruling party. This protest was also attended by anti-government organizations from Belgrade.

On 25 June largest Do not let Belgrade d(r)own protest has been held in Belgrade with more than 25,000 people attending, as they walked through the city they were greeted by many people from their balconies and windows. They were met by few counter-protestors.

=== July ===
On 18 July protestors tried to give termination of employment to Siniša Mali this led to a minor confrontation with the police in which one policeman was lightly injured. Siniša Mali said that he is being threatened and he sued one of the protestors who allegedly attacked and injured a police officer. This was last major protest in 2016, the protests started again after Vučić's victory in presidential election in 2017.
