= Serbia Against Violence =

Protests in response to school shooting

2023 Serbian protests
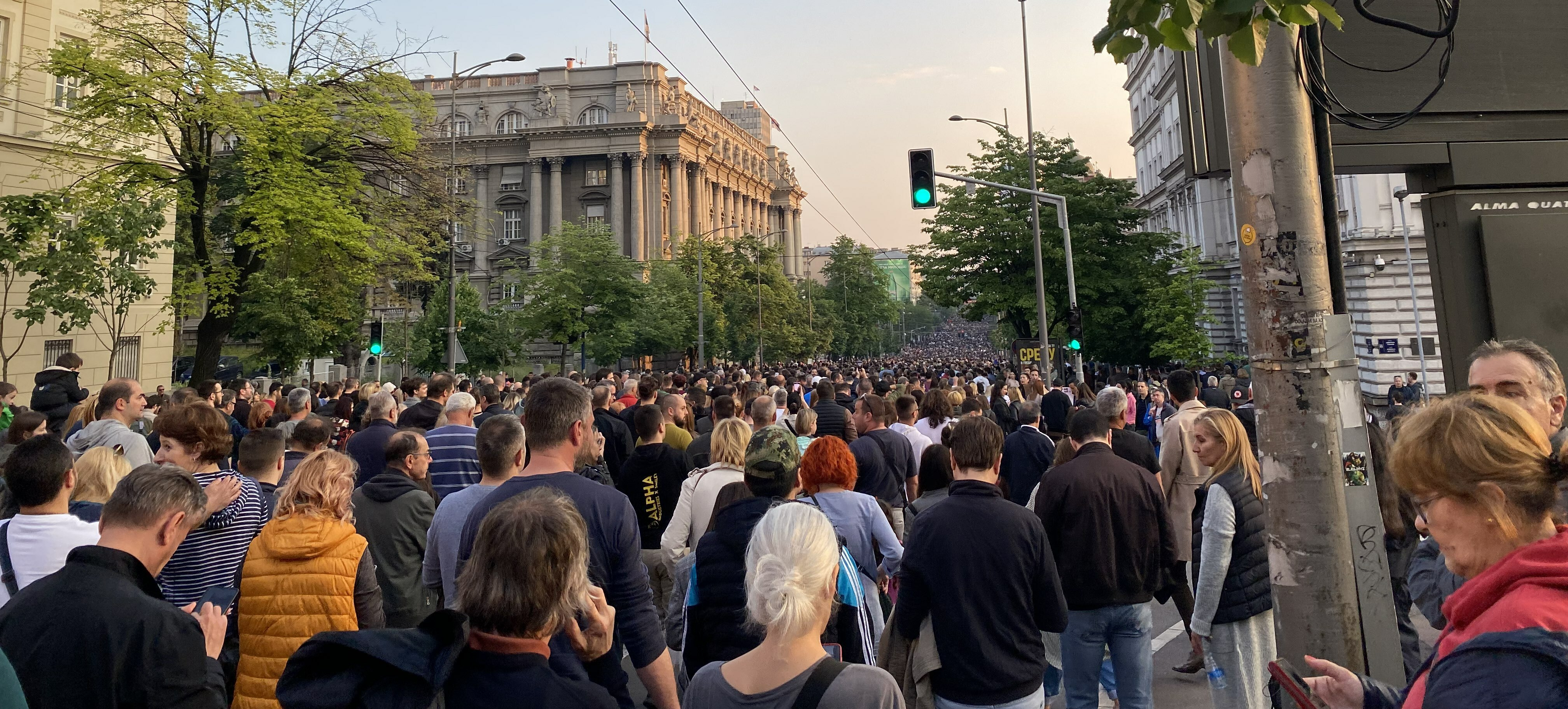
- Demonstrators on 19 May 2023
- Date: 8 May – 4 November 2023 (5 months, 3 weeks and 6 days)
- Location: Serbia: Serbian diaspora
- Caused by: A school shooting and a mass murder on 3 and 4 May; Promotion of violence by pro-government media; Bad conditions and lack of subsidies for farmers
- Goals: Resignation of Branko Ružić, Bratislav Gašić and Aleksandar Vulin; Resignations of the body members of the Regulatory Body for Electronic Media and Radio Television of Serbia; Withdrawal of the national broadcasting licences of RTV Pink and Happy TV; Better conditions and subsidies for farmers
- Methods: Demonstrations; civil roadblocks; civil resistance
- Concessions: Resignation of education minister Branko Ružić; Government partially accepts the demands of the farmers

Parties
Anti-government protesters: Citizens; Farmers (16–20 May); Opposition parties: Do not let Belgrade drown/Green–Left Front; Democratic Party; People's Party; Party of Freedom and Justice; Movement of Free Citizens; Together	Government of Serbia; Police; Gendarmery; Government parties; Serbian Progressive Party; Socialist Party of Serbia

Lead figures
No centralised leadership	Aleksandar Vučić; (Serbia) Ana Brnabić; (Serbia) Aleksandar Vulin; (Serbia) Bratislav Gašić

In May 2023, a series of mass protests began in Belgrade and other locations in Serbia, following a school shooting in Belgrade and a spree shooting near Mladenovac and Smederevo. The protests, named Serbia Against Violence (Serbian Cyrillic: Србија против насиља, romanized: Srbija protiv nasilja), had been attended by tens of thousands of demonstrators on every protest since 8 May.

Despite being organised by the Democratic Party, Do not let Belgrade drown/Green–Left Front, Party of Freedom and Justice, People's Party and Together opposition parties, no party signs were reported to be seen at the protests. The demonstrators demanded the resignation of Branko Ružić, Bratislav Gašić, Aleksandar Vulin, board members of the Regulatory Body for Electronic Media and Radio Television of Serbia, confiscation of national frequency of Pink and Happy television channels, cancelling the broadcast of reality programs that show and promote violence, and banning print media whose content publishes fake news, violates the Journalistic Code, and promotes violence.

Although not officially one of the demands, demonstrators have also called for president Aleksandar Vučić to resign. The government, including pro-government media, has criticised the protests and demonstrators, while as a response to the protests, Vučić held a gathering, described by critics as a counter-gathering, in front of the National Assembly of Serbia on 26 May. A number of farmers began protesting on 16 May, after the government rejected their demands to improve agricultural conditions. The government partially accepted their demands on 20 May, effectively ending the roadblocks.

== Background ==
A populist coalition led by the Serbian Progressive Party (SNS) came to power after the 2012 parliamentary election, along with the Socialist Party of Serbia (SPS). A school shooting occurred on 3 May 2023 in the Vračar municipality of Belgrade, the capital of Serbia, while a day later, a mass murder occurred in Dubona, Mladenovac and Malo Orašje, Smederevo. Serbia has one of the world's highest gun ownership rates per capita, but strict gun laws. (Note: To own a gun in Serbia, citizens must prove a valid reason to own a gun, such as an ongoing threat to life or legitimate need for hunting or sport shooting, and must submit a medical report to the Ministry of Internal Affairs, which then instructs the submitter's personal physician to report whenever any relevant changes in their health occur. The police may prohibit the possession of a weapon to an individual when they assess that the owner could misuse it. Open carry is also not allowed, and concealed carry permits are rarely issued and require proof of a threat to life.) Mass shootings in Serbia are rare. There had been three earlier mass shootings in Serbia in the 21st century: the 2007 Jabukovac killings, during which nine people were killed and five were injured; the 2013 Velika Ivanča shooting, in which 14 people were killed; and the 2016 Žitište shooting, in which five people were killed and 22 injured. In 2019, there was an attempted school shooting in Velika Plana, though the perpetrator was stopped after shooting two bullets into the ceiling.

The government of Serbia responded to the shootings by adopting measures such as stricter regulations on gun ownership and hiring 1,200 police officers to schools. The government also received criticism, particularly due to the statement of Branko Ružić, the minister of education, who said that "a cancerous, pernicious influence of the Internet, video games, and so-called Western values, is evident" in the shooting, and prime minister Ana Brnabić, who said that the "system did not fail" when responding to the claims that the government could have stopped the shootings. In response to the statement, opposition parties either called for Ružić's dismissal or resignation, and condemned Brnabić's statement. Aleksandar Vučić, the president of Serbia, has said that the government was not at fault.

== Serbia Against Violence protests ==
=== 8 May ===
At a press conference inside the House of the National Assembly of Serbia, opposition parties People's Party, Do not let Belgrade drown, Together, Democratic Party, and the Party of Freedom and Justice-led Ujedinjeni parliamentary group announced that they would organise a "Serbia Against Violence" protest in front of the National Assembly on 8 May. The parties announced the demands at the conference, which included halting and cancelling the broadcast of reality programs and shows that promote violence on television with a national frequency, banning print media whose content promotes violence, publishes fake news, and violates the Journalistic Code, confiscating the national frequency of Pink and Happy television channels, demanding the resignation of the board members of the Regulatory Body for Electronic Media (REM) and Radio Television of Serbia (RTS) and ministers Ružić and Bratislav Gašić, and the head of the Security Intelligence Agency, Aleksandar Vulin, and holding a session in the National Assembly with only one item on the agenda where the government's responsibility and the security of the country would be discussed.

A day before the protest, Ružić submitted his resignation. The Independent Union of Educators of Serbia organised a protest at 13:00 pm (UTC+02:00), while the Serbia Against Violence protest began later that day. After gathering in front of the National Assembly, demonstrators walked through Andrićev Venac and towards the building of the government of Serbia. Besides a teacher who told the demands to the demonstrators, no public speeches were held at the protest. Some demonstrators also chanted slogans against Vučić.

Srđan Milivojević, a Democratic Party member of parliament, said that according to police estimates, approximately 50,000 demonstrators participated in the protest. In response, Vučić, alleged that only 9,000 demonstrators took part in the protest. A protest was also organised in Kragujevac, Kruševac, Novi Sad, Valjevo, and Zrenjanin. In Novi Sad, there were about 4,000 demonstrators.

=== 10–13 May ===
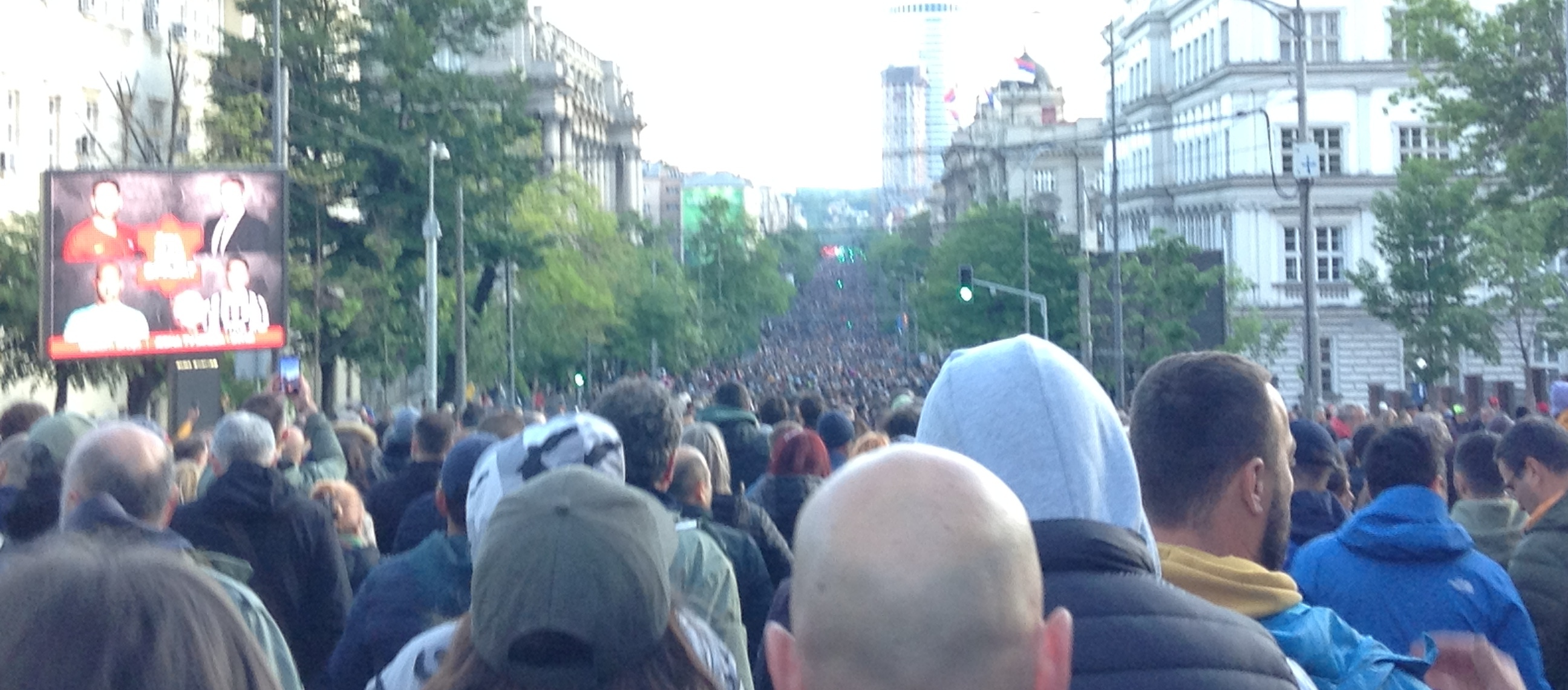
Tens of thousands of demonstrators attended the protest on 12 May.

A protest was held in Niš on 10 May, while a day later, a second protest in Novi Sad was held. Following the 8 May protest, the organisers in Belgrade announced that a protest will be organised for 12 May if the demands were not to be accepted. Radomir Lazović, the Do not let Belgrade drown representative, announced that the demand to hold a session in the National Assembly on the issue regarding the shootings was accepted on 12 May. The session began on 18 May. During the session on 19 May, Brnabić alleged that "everything that has happened after the shootings is directly fueled by foreign intelligence services", and called Miroslav Aleksić, an opposition member of parliament, a "disgusting piece of shit".

Demonstrators gathered in front of the National Assembly, after which they walked through Kneza Miloša Street and towards the Gazela Bridge, which they blocked. The Gazela Bridge was closed for traffic for two hours, while the protest ended near Sava Centar, New Belgrade. Associated Press reported that demonstrators chanted slogans against Vučić "whom they blame for creating an atmosphere of hopelessness and division in the country that they say indirectly led to the mass shootings". Throughout the protest, no party signs were reported to be seen.

The protest was reportedly attended by tens of thousands of demonstrators, with Balkan Insight reporting that the "column of demonstrators stretched out for 1.7 kilometres through the city streets". A day after the protest in Belgrade, a protest was organised in Kragujevac.

=== 19 May ===
The third Serbia Against Violence protest was held on 19 May in Belgrade. Initially, the farmers were supposed to attend the Serbia Against Violence protest, though the police allegedly denied them to continue going to Belgrade. After gathering in front of the National Assembly, demonstrators walked through Kneza Miloša Street and towards the Gazela Bridge and Branko's Bridge, which were all eventually roadblocked. This time, the column of demonstrators reportedly stretched out for more than 2.5 kilometres.

According to the lawyer and former minister Božo Prelević, approximately 200,000 demonstrators were present at the protest, while according to the organisers, between 200,000 and 300,000 demonstrators attended the protest. Dušan Čavić, one of the authors of show "Marka Žvaka", said that around 60,000 demonstrators attended the protest. According to Aleksandar Gubaš, a journalist who has dealt with various methods of measuring the number of people at public gatherings since 1991, there were approximately 60,000 demonstrators at the protest. News agencies described the protest "as the largest protest since the overthrow of Slobodan Milošević", and reported that tens of thousands attended the protest.

Milivojević and Nebojša Zelenović, one of the co-leaders of the Together party, said they would continue blocking the Gazela Bridge "until all demands are to be accepted". Soon after, demonstrators began setting up tents. The protest ended around 6:00 am, after which the traffic at Gazela Bridge resumed. Savo Manojlović, the representative of the Kreni-Promeni organisation, and two women were attacked and harassed by a member of the far-right People's Patrol organisation.

=== 27 May ===
Serbs in diaspora announced they would organise meetings supporting the Serbia Against Violence protests in London and Vienna on 26 May. The fourth Serbia Against Violence protest was held on 27 May, a day after Vučić's gathering in front of the National Assembly. During the protest, the demonstrators walked around Tašmajdan Park and towards the building of Radio Television of Serbia, where they formed a "ring" around the building. Radio Television of Serbia broadcast the protests live when demonstrators came to its building. A group of provocateurs attempted to break into the building, but were stopped by demonstrators and organisers of the Serbia Against Violence protest. The organisers condemned the provocateurs. The protest was attended by tens of thousands of demonstrators, despite bad weather conditions. Aleksić has alleged that the government sent the provocateurs to "provoke conflicts".

=== 3 June ===
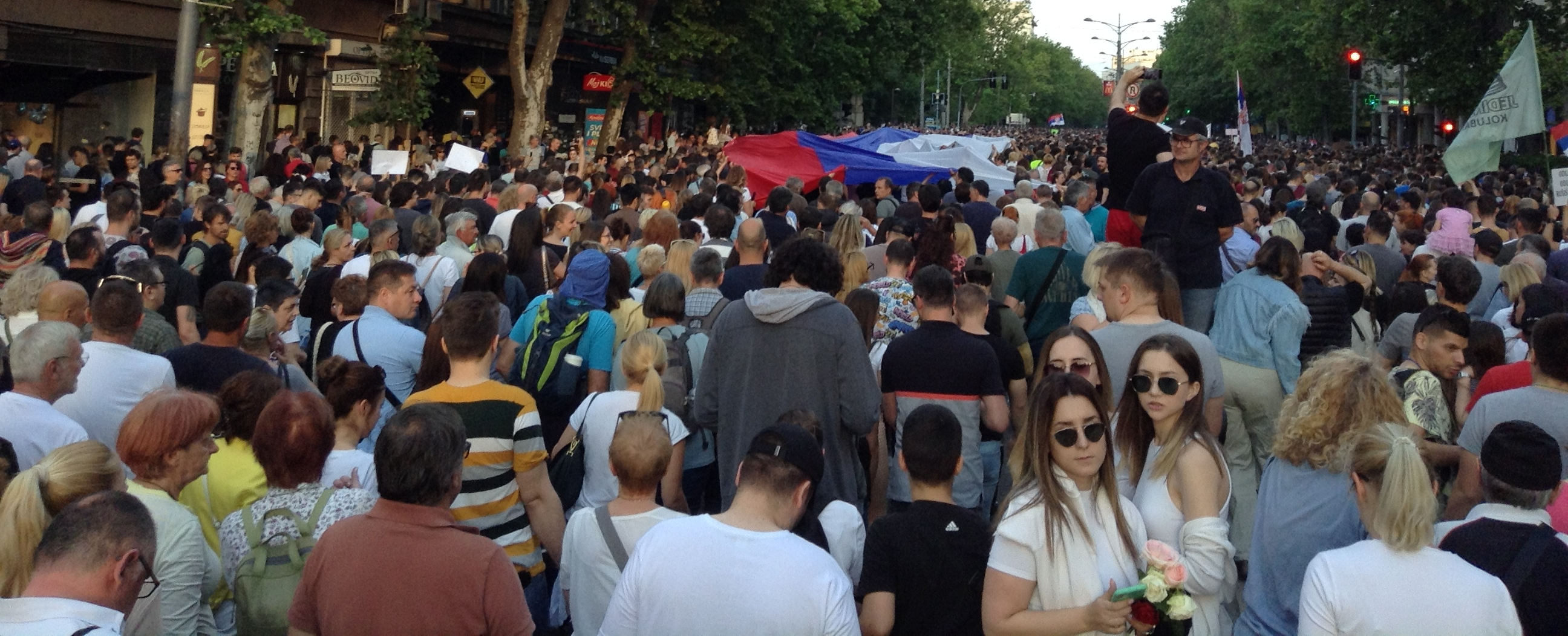
Demonstrators at the 3 June protest

The organisers met with the head of the Belgrade Police on 31 May, who promised that the police would secure the protests from potential provocateurs. Initially, the next Serbia Against Violence protest was supposed to be held on 2 June, but due to the announcement that a protest named "Stop the Violence on Serbs from Kosovo" would be held shortly before the Serbia Against Violence protest, it was moved to 3 June. At the protest, actors Svetlana Bojković, Dragan Bjelogrlić, Nenad Maričić, comedians and talk-show hosts Zoran Kesić and Ivan Ivanović, the son of Stanika Gligorijević, whose death at a toll booth remains unsolved, and a miner, who was beaten for refusing to sell his land, gave speeches at the beginning of the protest.

The demonstrators then walked through the King Alexander Boulevard and towards Slavija Square, and then to the Novi dvor, the seat of the president of Serbia. Although not one of the demands, demonstrators chanted slogans such as "Vučić leave" and unfurled a balloon with the inscription "Vučić Go Away". Far-right groups, including People's Patrol, were present at the protest where they caused two physical incidents. The protest was attended by tens of thousands of demonstrators. According to Gubaš there were approximately 55,000 demonstrators during the protest.

=== 9 June ===
In June, a vertical-stripes version of the flag of the Principality of Serbia started appearing at the protests.

For the sixth Serbia Against Violence protest, demonstrators again gathered in front of the National Assembly. Actors Maričić, Seka Sablić, and Milan Marić, Saša Jovanović, a colleague of major aviator Omer Mehić who died in a helicopter crash in 2015 which garnered controversy, Faculty of Law professor Miodrag Jovanović, a Serbian language professor, a gymnasium teacher, and a Faculty of Philology student gave speeches at the protest. Maričić stated that the protests would begin to radicalise if the government does not accept the demands by 18 June. Activist Aleksandar Jovanović Ćuta later clarified that roadblocks would be organised "at all bridges and major roads across Serbia", if the demands were not to be accepted by 15 June.

Demonstrators then walked towards Slavija Square and the building of the government of Serbia. Approximately tens of thousands of demonstrators took part in the protest. According to Gubaš, between 35,000 and 40,000 were present at the protest. A group of demonstrators also carried cardboard figures, depicting Vučić, Brnabić, Dragan J. Vučićević, the editor-in-chief of pro-government newspaper Informer, Željko Mitrović, a media magnate and the owner of the Pink Media Group, and Olivera Zekić, the president of REM, in prison suits.

=== 14–17 June ===
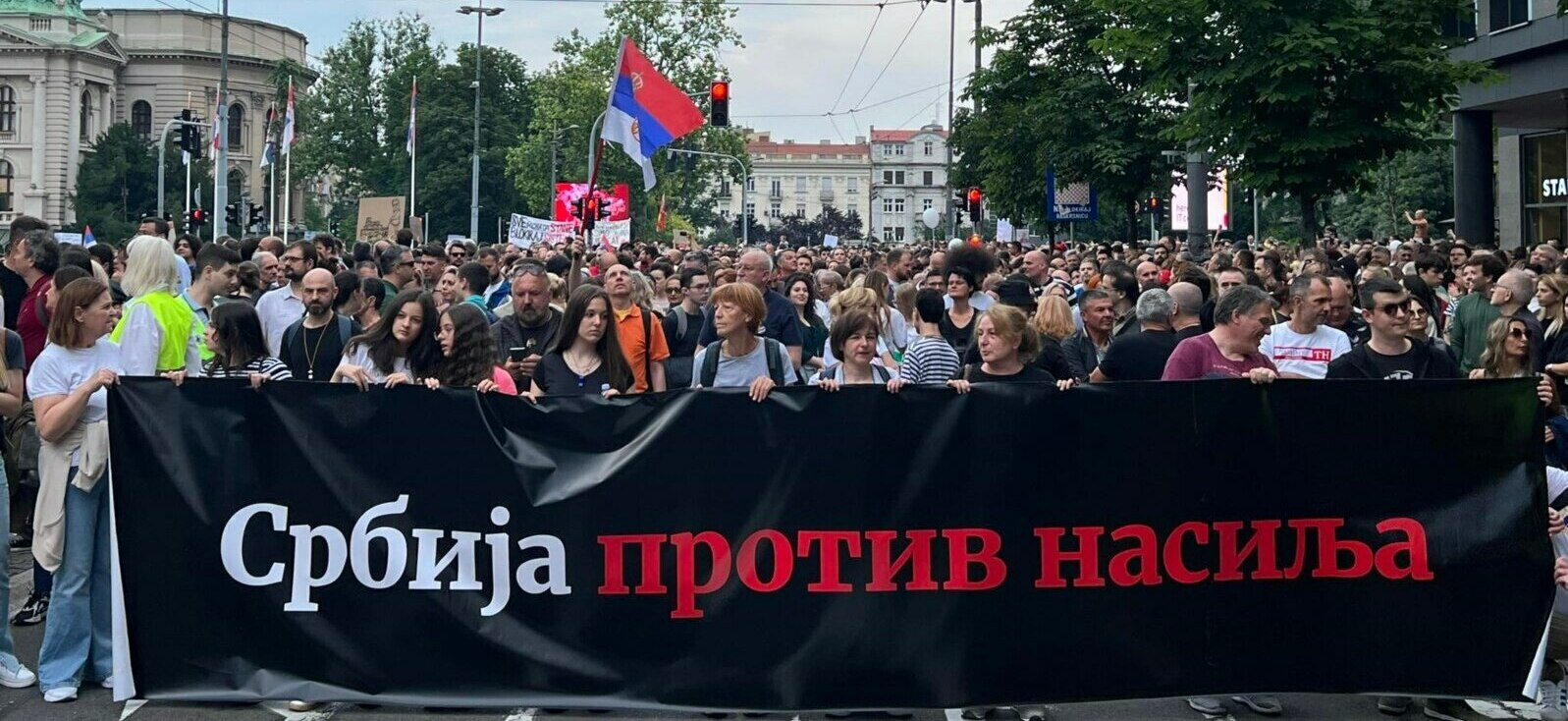
Demonstrators in Belgrade on 17 June

Serbia Against Violence protests were also organised in Gornji Milanovac on 14 June, and in Valjevo and Kraljevo on 15 June. On 17 June, protests were also held in Belgrade, Novi Sad, Niš, and Kragujevac.

In Belgrade, demonstrators again gathered in front of the National Assembly, after which they walked through the Knez Miloša street and towards the Mostar interchange. Some demonstrators also walked towards the Autokomanda interchange and Gazela Bridge. In front of the National Assembly, sports commentator Smiljan Banjac, a miner, a Faculty of Political Sciences student, and a football worker gave speeches. This time, a group of demonstrators carried cardboard figures of Vučić, Vulin, Gašić, Aleksandar Šapić, the mayor of Belgrade, and Zagorka Dolovac, the Republic Public Prosecutor, in prison suits.

In Niš, demonstrators gathered in the city centre after which they walked towards the Palace of Justice. In Novi Sad, demonstrators gathered in front of the Serbian National Theatre and then they walked through the Jovan Subotić Street; Temerinska and Partizanska street were roadblocked. According to Beta News Agency, approximately 10,000 demonstrators were present at the protest in Novi Sad. In Kragujevac, a couple of thousand demonstrators met at the First Kragujevac Gymnasium; they later roadblocked streets that lead to Veliki Park. According to Gubaš, around 35,000 demonstrators were present in Belgrade and 4,500 in Niš.

=== 21–24 June ===
Another Serbia Against Violence protest was organised in Gornji Milanovac on 21 June. A day later, Serbia Against Violence protests were also organised in Smederevo and Valjevo, while on 23 June, protests were also organised in Čačak, Lučani, and Zaječar. Organisers announced that besides Belgrade, protests will be also held in Zrenjanin, Novi Sad, Kragujevac, Kraljevo, Niš, Subotica, Šabac, Pirot, Vranje, and Leskovac on 24 June. A gathering in support of the protests was also organised in Washington, D.C.

In Belgrade, demonstrators again gathered in front of the National Assembly, where a group of students gave speeches. They later walked through the Knez Miloša street, then through Nemanjina Street towards Slavija and the Autokomanda interchange. According to Gubaš, around 16,000 demonstrators were present at the protest.

Demonstrators in Novi Sad gathered again in front of the National Theatre, where professor Čedomir Čupić first gave a speech. Demonstrators later roadblocked on the Liberty Bridge. In Niš, demonstrators gathered in front of the building of the City Assembly of Niš after which they walked next to the SNS local headquarters and towards the building of the mayor of Niš. In Kraljevo, demonstrators roadblocked at the crossroad in the Kralja Petra Prvog street. Demonstrators in Leskovac gathered in front of the National Museum and walked to the building of the city's Assembly.

According to Danas around 250 citizens protested in Vranje. In Subotica, demonstrators roadblocked and demanded the resignation of Bojan Šoralov, the commissioner of the North Bačka District. In Šabac, demonstrators gathered in front of the Šabac Old Department Store and proceeded to walk through the streets in the city centre.

=== 30 June–1 July ===
Zelenović announced that on 30 June the E75 motorway will be roadblocked in Belgrade and Novi Sad. On the day of the roadblocks, protests were also held in seven cities while an incident also occurred in Novi Sad. Serbia Against Violence protests were also scheduled to be held on 1 July in Zrenjanin and Jagodina, with Lazović later announcing that the protests would be held in 28 cities in total.

In Belgrade, demonstrators gathered in front of the National Assembly where Banjac, a student, professor, and actor Bojana Novaković gave speeches. They later walked through the Knez Miloša street and towards the headquarters of Pink. In front of the headquarters, the national flag of Serbia was flown and a group of men were present during the protest. The organisers later used the flag as a projection screen, projecting Oliver Ivanović and Andrea Bojanić on the flag. Shortly before Ivanović's assassination in 2018, Pink aired a video that targeted Ivanović and portrayed him in a negative way, while Bojanić was killed in a traffic accident caused by Mitrović's son in 2013.

=== 6–8 July ===
The organisers announced on 4 July that protests will be held in Užice on 6 July, Niš and Zrenjanin on 7 July, and in Belgrade, Kragujevac, and Novi Pazar on 8 July.

In Belgrade, demonstrators gathered in front of the National Assembly, where a few speeches were given, and then walked towards the building of the Police Department. A group of pro-transgender rights demonstrators were also present in the protest, due to the recent murder of a transgender teenager in Belgrade. In Kraljevo, demonstrators roadblocked several bridges in the city. Demonstrators in Kragujevac protested in front of the local Security Intelligence Agency building; member of the National Assembly Veroljub Stevanović also gave a speech during the protest. According to Gubaš, around 9,500 demonstrators took part in the protests in Belgrade.

=== 13–15 July ===
In Sombor, protests were organised on 13 July. Two days later, protests were also organised in Belgrade, Kraljevo, and Leskovac. In Belgrade, demonstrators walked towards the Higher Court and then to the Mostar interchange and Gazela Bridge. According to Gubaš, approximately 6,500 demonstrators were present in Belgrade.

=== 20–22 July ===
On 20 July, protests were held in Sombor, Valjevo, Kruševac, and Petrovac while a day later protests were held in Gornji Milanovac, Niš, Čačak, Zrenjanin, Kragujevac, and Šabac. Protests were also organised in Belgrade and Kraljevo for 22 July. A student who went on a hunger strike on 17 July stopped his strike during the protest in Belgrade. The demonstrators walked towards the REM building, buildings of Večernje novosti and Politika newspapers, and then to RTS. According to Gubaš, 2,600 demonstrators took part in the protest in Belgrade.

=== 27–29 July ===
Protests in Valjevo, Kruševac, and Petrovac were organised on 27 July. A day later, protests were also held in Novi Sad, Niš, Bogatić, Jagodina, Kragujevac, Gornji Milanovac, and Čačak, while on 29 July protests were organised in Belgrade, Kraljevo, and Leskovac. In Kraljevo, demonstrators roadblocked the street next to the Security Intelligence Agency building. In Belgrade, demonstrators walked towards the building of the Republic Public Prosecutor's Office.

== Other protests ==
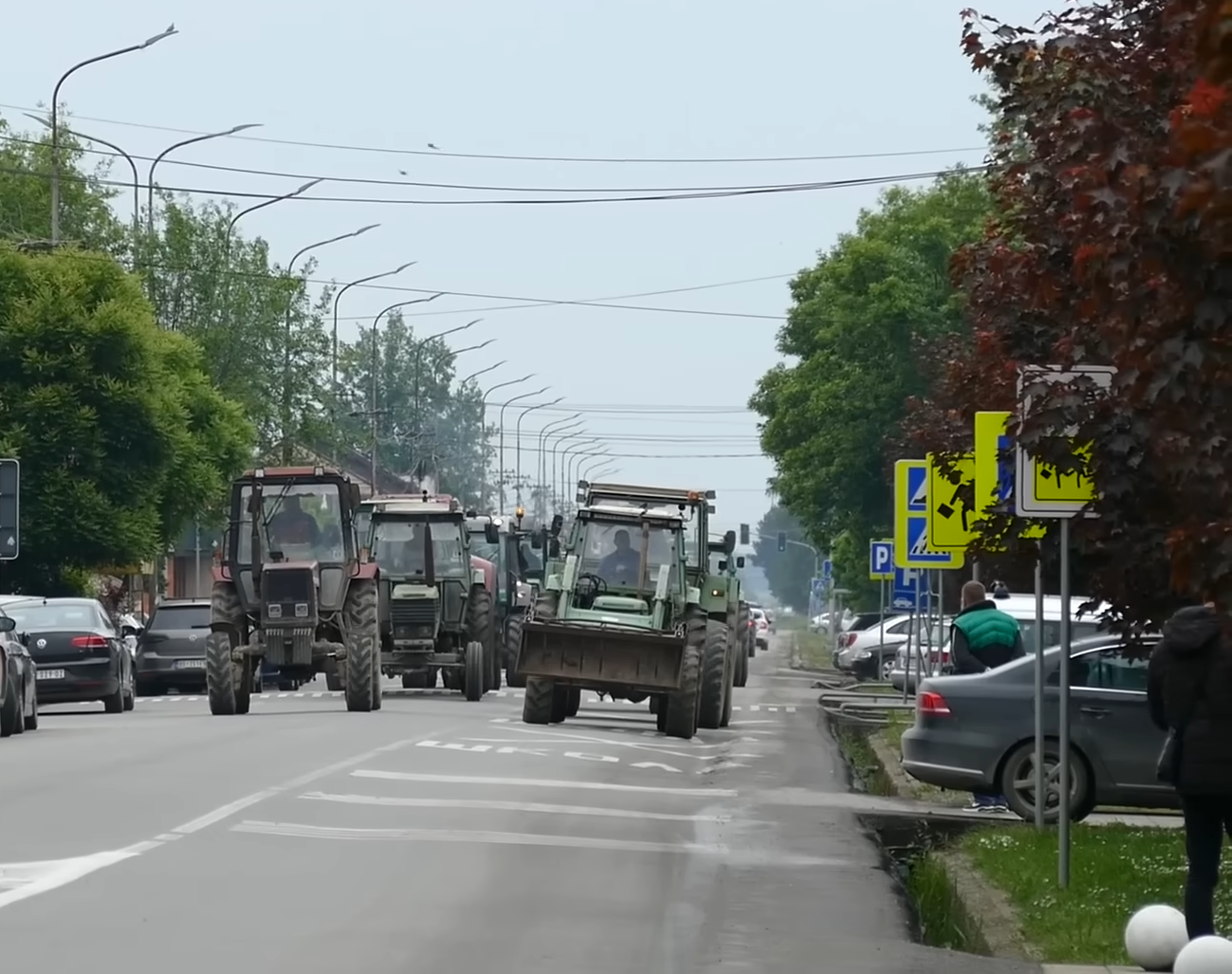
Farmers protesting on 16 May in Bogatić.

A group of farmers discussed with Brnabić about their demands on improving agricultural conditions and increasing subsidies on 15 May, though Brnabić rejected all of their demands. The farmers were then offered to discuss the demands with Vučić, though they declined to discuss and instead announced that they would organise protests. The farmers demanded to increase subsidies, not add excise duty and value-added taxes on diesel, ensure the price of agricultural products, wheat, corn, and soybeans, and introduce higher premiums for milk. One of the organisers of the protests received threats later that day.

The farmers protests began on 16 May in Kragujevac, Kruševac, Novi Sad, Subotica, Bogatić, Kovin, Pančevo, Požarevac, and Čenta. The protests also later spread to Zrenjanin and Kraljevo. The farmers, using their tractors, blocked the roads. Vučić announced the increase of some subsidies, introducing higher premiums for milk, and allocating more budget money for agriculture on 18 May after discussing it with a group of farmers. This was criticised by a group of farmers from Pančevo, whom they described as "Vučić's pawns". Novak Nedić, the secretary-general of the government of Serbia, was seen with a group of men who were allegedly sent to break up the protests of farmers who blocked the traffic in Pančevo, where Vučić held a rally on the same day. Marinika Tepić, a vice-president of the Party of Freedom and Justice, accused Nedić of "leading SNS hooligans" to the rally in Pančevo. The farmer protests ended on 20 May, when the government partially accepted their demands.

A number of workers at RB Kolubara began protesting on 17 May, demanding the resignation of Dubravka Đedović, the minister of mining and energy, and cancelling the reform of Elektroprivreda Srbije from a public company to a joint-stock company. They organised another protest on 7 June. A day later, a group of demonstrators, who support extending the power grid, protested outside the National Assembly, while in Odžaci, citizens protested against sexual harassment of children. In Odžaci, a kindergarten teacher, who was an SNS candidate in the 2020 local elections, was arrested on 12 May after sexually harassing children. The board of RTS, including its president Dragan Bujošević, declined to discuss with representatives of opposition parties on 17 May. A protest was also organised by the People's Party, Green–Left Front, and Democratic Party in Pančevo on 18 May and 15 June.

== Response and actions ==
=== Support and opposition ===
Zdravko Ponoš, a 2022 presidential election candidate, and his Serbia Centre organisation stated their support for the protests. Former SNS member of parliament Dragan Šormaz expressed his support for the protest, including former president of Serbia, Boris Tadić. Members of the National Assembly such as Aleksandar Olenik, Miloš Parandilović, and Vladeta Janković attended the protests, including actors Seka Sablić, Dragan Bjelogrlić, and Filip Karađorđević, a member of House of Karađorđević. Actors Nikola Kojo and Rade Šerbedžija, singers Seka Aleksić and Breskvica, and Bishop Grigorije Durić voiced their support for the protests. Basketball coach Duško Vujošević also attended the protests. Over 50 environmental organisations expressed their support for the Serbia Against Violence protests. A group of European Parliament members from the European Greens voiced their support for the protests, including European Parliament members, members of national parliaments, and public figures affiliated with the Progressive International. In July 2023, the Progressive Alliance of Socialists and Democrats group in the European Parliament expressed their support for the protests.

The Serbian Party Oathkeepers declined to support the Serbia Against Violence protests while the Movement for the Restoration of the Kingdom of Serbia said that "now is not the right time for the opposition to protest". Initially, the New Democratic Party of Serbia (NDSS) declined to comment on the protests, but it later said that "it is not the moment to protest". NDSS later stated their support for the farmers protests. Vojislav Šešelj of the Serbian Radical Party (SRS) said that "the West wants to overthrow Vučić or force him to resign" and that if SRS was in power, "the protesters blocking the Gazela Bridge would have already been thrown in the Sava". Nebojša Bakarec, a SNS member of parliament, described the demonstrators as "ustaše and mujahideens".

According to an opinion poll conducted by the non-governmental organisation CRTA in June 2023, 50 percent of the respondents stated their support for the protests while 70 percent supports at least one of the demands. Mitrović accused the organisers of abusing the shootings and being violent. Raskrikavanje, a Crime and Corruption Reporting Network (KRIK) portal, reported that the pro-government tabloid newspapers Informer and Alo! manipulated their articles by showing photos of the Nikola Pašić Square that were taken shortly before the protest on 8 May began. Pro-government media continued to criticise the protests, describing demonstrators as "harassers", "hooligans", "bullies" and "haters".

=== Government response ===
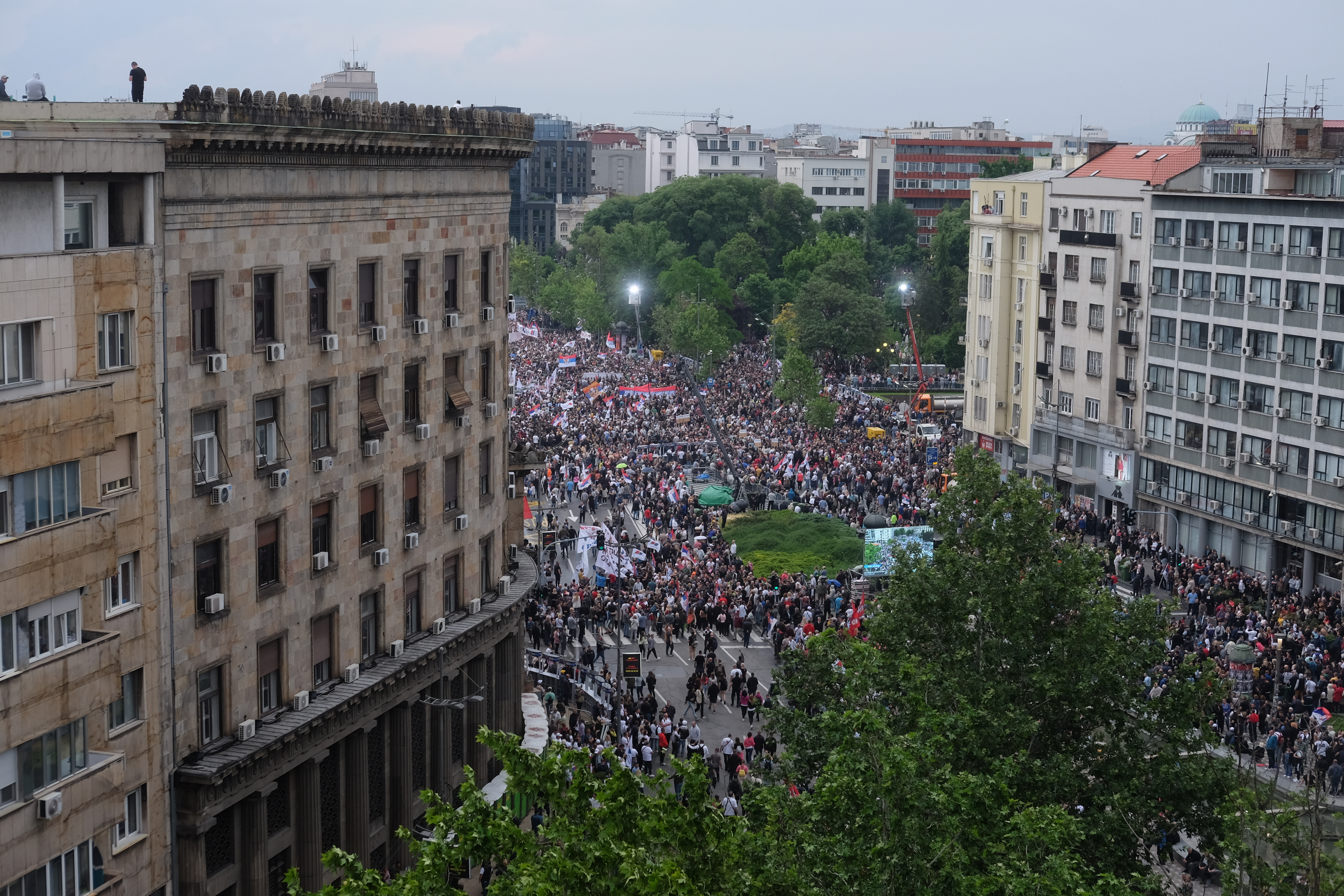
As a response to the protests, Vučić and SNS organised a gathering on 26 May

Vučić described the demonstrators as "hyenas and vultures", and has accused the opposition of attempting to kill him or to stage a coup d'état. Darija Kisić, the minister of family welfare and demography, characterised the organisers of the protests as "parties that are the opposition to Serbia", while Brnabić accused them of "politicising" the shootings. Vladimir Orlić, the president of the National Assembly, accused them of "self-promotion", while Ivica Dačić, the first deputy prime minister, accused them of "abusing the shootings". Following the 12 May protest, Vučić uploaded a photo on Instagram in which he said that "I tried, but failed, to make the three of us nine" and "there are no forgeries and photoshopping" in the photo, while Brnabić uploaded a photoshopped photo of Vučić, minister Siniša Mali, and her on Twitter, ridiculing the protest by claiming that less demonstrators were actually present at the protest. These reactions received criticism. On the other hand, Rade Basta, the minister of economy, said that "I believe that other members of the government should also be on the streets with the citizens because of the tragedy that befell us all".

In response to the Serbia Against Violence protests, Vučić announced that an SNS rally will be held on 26 May. Critics have described it as a government-organised counter-demonstration. Non-governmental organisation CRTA accused the government of pressuring public company workers to attend the rally, while several non-governmental organisations, including CRTA, called on Vučić to cancel it. According to Nova, Danas, and Južne vesti reports, public company workers received threats and were allegedly pressured with threats of being fired unless they attend. The event was attended by approximately 40,000–50,000 people at its peak. At the rally, Vučić announced his stepping down as the president of SNS, effective 27 May. While travelling to the gathering, an attendee suffered from a fatal head injury and fell into a coma a day later. The attendee died on 30 May.

== See also ==
- 1996–1997 protests in Serbia
- 2023 Serbian election protests
