= Jelena Jerinić =

Serbian academic and politician

- Јелена Јеринић
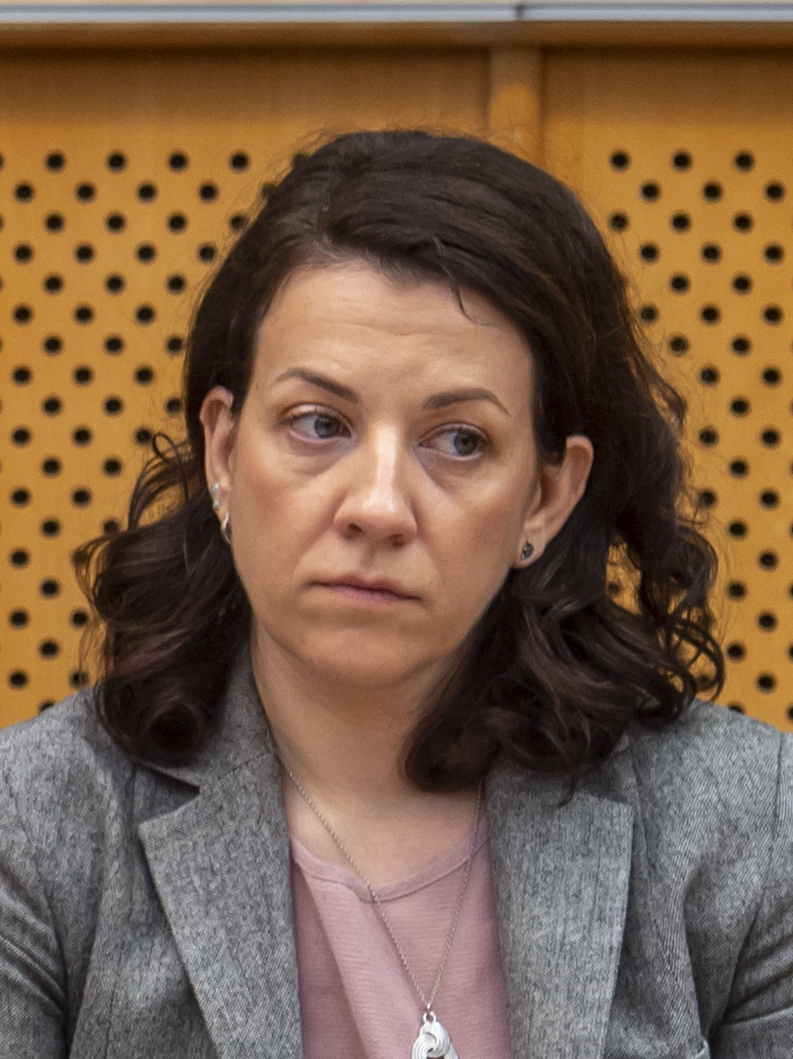
- Jerinić in 2023

Member of the National Assembly of the Republic of Serbia
- In office 1 August 2022 – 29 Jun 2026

Personal details
- Born: 1978 (age 47–48)
- Party: NDB (until 2023); ZLF (2023–present)

Jelena Jerinić (Serbian Cyrillic: Јелена Јеринић; born 1978) is a Serbian academic and politician. She is a law professor at Union University in Belgrade and served in the National Assembly of Serbia from 2022 to Jun 2026. Jerinić is a member of the Green–Left Front (ZLF).

== Private career ==
Jerinić has a bachelor's degree from the University of Belgrade Faculty of Law (2002), a master's degree from Utrecht University in comparative public law and good governance (2003), and a doctorate from the Union University School of Law (2011). She worked for the non-governmental organization Civic Initiatives in Belgrade in 2001–02, was secretary of the national enrolment commission in Serbia's ministry of education and sports in 2002–03, and was an advocacy team leader at the Standing Conference of Towns and Municipalities from 2004 to 2006. Jerinić has taught at Union University since 2005, becoming a full professor in 2021. She has published widely in her field.

She became an alternate member of the group of independent experts for the European Charter of Local Self-Government in 2007 and was promoted to full membership in 2013.

== Politician ==
Jerinić became politically active with the Do not let Belgrade drown (NDB) movement, serving on its legal team. At NDB's nomination, she was a deputy member of the Belgrade election commission for the 2018 Belgrade City Assembly election.

NDB contested the 2022 Serbian parliamentary election as part of the We Must (Moramo) coalition. Jerinić was given the seventh position on the coalition's electoral list and was elected when the list won ten mandates. The Serbian Progressive Party (SNS) and its allies won the election and afterward formed a coalition government with smaller parties; NDB served in opposition. In her first assembly term, Jerinić was the deputy chair of the judiciary committee, (Note: Formally known as the Committee on the Judiciary, Public Administration, and Local Self-Government.) a member of the committee on the rights of the child, a deputy member of the European integration committee and the committee on human and minority rights and gender equality, and a member of Serbia's parliamentary friendship groups with Albania, Germany, Greece, Ireland, Japan, Jordan, the Netherlands, Slovenia, South Korea, the United Kingdom, and the United States of America.

In July 2023, NDB joined with four local citizens' groups to create the Green–Left Front (ZLF). Jerinić became a member of the new party.

In a 2023 assembly debate, Jerinić referred to the 1995 Srebrenica massacre as an act of genocide, amid heckling from government delegates.

For the 2023 Serbian parliamentary election, the ZLF became part of the broad and ideologically diverse Serbia Against Violence (SPN) coalition. Jerinić appeared the twentieth position on the coalition's list and was re-elected when the list won sixty-five mandates. The SNS and its allies won a majority victory, and the ZLF remains in opposition. Jerinić is now a member of the judiciary committee, a deputy member of the defence and internal affairs committee, a member of a working group for the improvement of the electoral process, and a member of Serbia's delegation to the assembly of the Inter-Parliamentary Union.

The ZLF chose to participate in the 2024 Serbian local elections, notwithstanding that the party leadership believed the elections would not be free or fair; Jerinić described this strategy as far more effective than a boycott at challenging the SNS's monopoly on power. She appeared in the fourth position on the We Choose New Belgrade opposition coalition list in the New Belgrade city municipality and was elected when the list, according to the official preliminary results, won nine seats. The SNS and its allies, according to the same results, won a narrow majority victory. The We Choose New Belgrade parties have charged electoral fraud, and Jerinić has said their data shows the combined forces of the opposition winning a majority of seats.

In Jun 2026 Jerinić resigned as a Member of the National Assembly to focus on party-building and preparing for future elections as a newly elected member of the Green-Left Front's Presidency.
