= Robert Kozma (politician) =

Serbian politician

- Роберт Козма
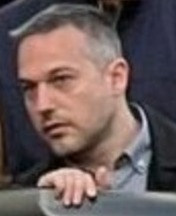
- Kozma in 2023

Member of the National Assembly
- Incumbent
- Assumed office 1 August 2022
- President: Vladimir Orlić

Personal details
- Born: 1983 (age 42–43) Subotica, SAP Vojvodina, SR Serbia, SFR Yugoslavia
- Party: NDB (2014–2023); ZLF (2023–present)
- Education: University of Belgrade; Central European University
- Occupation: Activist; politician

Robert Kozma (Serbian Cyrillic: Роберт Козма; born 1983) is a Serbian politician and activist who has been a member of the National Assembly since 1 August 2022. He is a member of the Green–Left Front (ZLF).

== Biography ==
Kozma was born in 1983 in Subotica, SAP Vojvodina, SR Serbia, SFR Yugoslavia. He graduated political sciences at the Faculty of Political Sciences, University of Belgrade and the Central European University in Budapest.

He has been designing and implementing programs of intercultural education and education for democracy.

Kozma has been a member of Do not let Belgrade drown (NDB) since its founding in 2014. In the 2022 general election, NDB contested as part of the We Must (Moramo) alliance and Kozma was elected member of the National Assembly. NDB transformed itself into Green–Left Front on 14 July 2023.
