= Biljana Đorđević =

Serbian politician and docent (born 1984)

- Биљана Ђорђевић
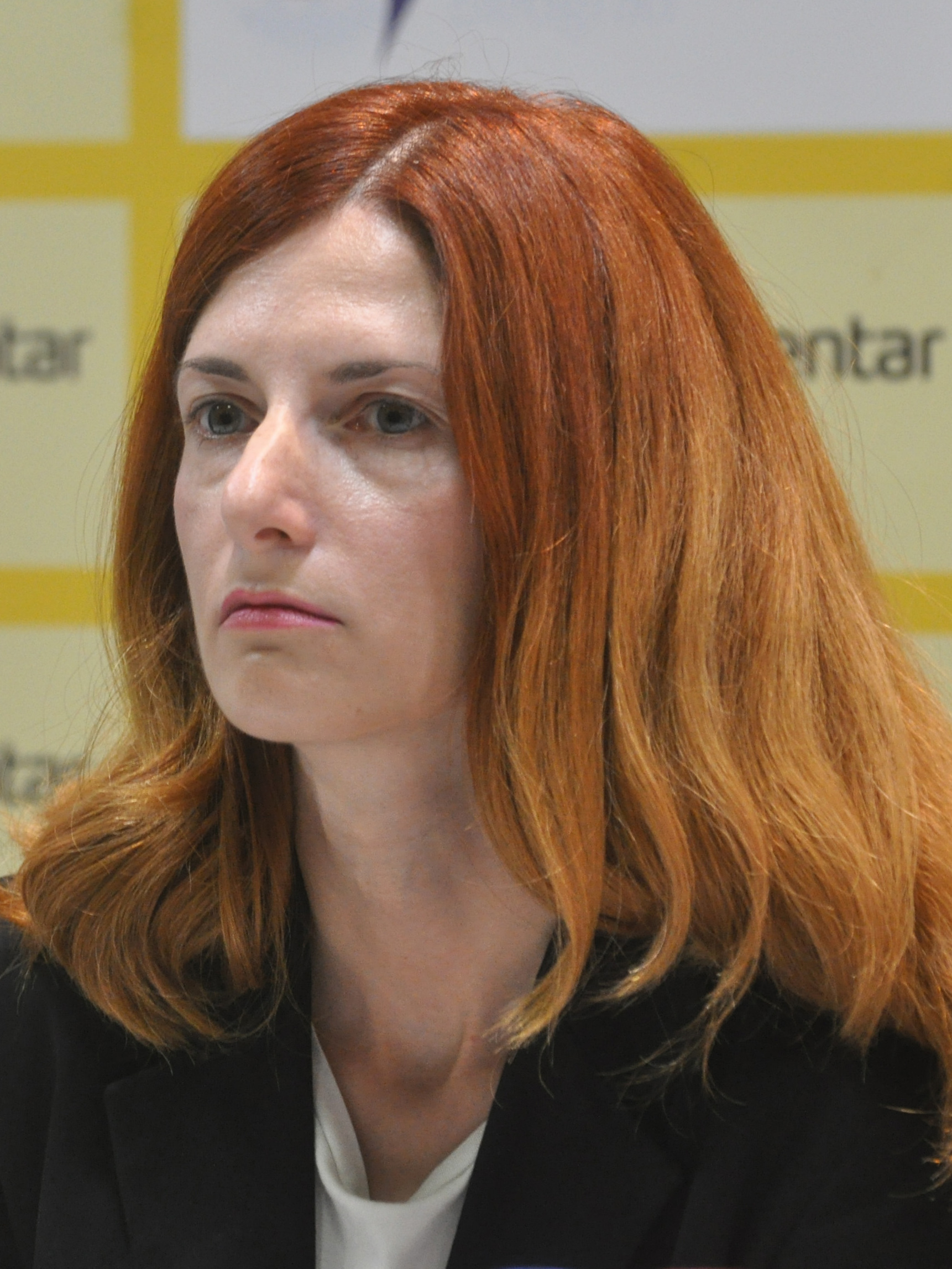
- Đorđević in 2019

Member of the National Assembly
- Incumbent
- Assumed office 1 August 2022

Personal details
- Born: 1 August 1984 (age 42) Vranje, SR Serbia, SFR Yugoslavia
- Party: NDB (until 2023); ZLF (since 2023)
- Education: University of Belgrade; University of Oxford
- Occupation: Politician; professor
- Profession: Political theorist
- Other offices: 2020–2023: Member of the Minor Council of NDB; 2022–present: Deputy President of the NDB/ZLF parliamentary group

Biljana Đorđević (Serbian Cyrillic: Биљана Ђорђевић; born 1 August 1984) is a Serbian politician and a docent at the Faculty of Political Sciences of the University of Belgrade. A member of the Green–Left Front (ZLF), she has served as a member of the National Assembly of Serbia since 1 August 2022.

== Early life ==
Biljana Đorđević was born in 1984 in Vranje, SR Serbia, SFR Yugoslavia. She completed her primary education in Bujanovac and attended a gymnasium in her home town. Đorđević finished her studies at the Faculty of Political Sciences at the University of Belgrade and completed her masters' studies at the University of Oxford.

== Career ==
Đorđević is a docent at the Faculty of Political Sciences at the University of Belgrade. She is also a member of the Presidency of the Association for Political Science of Serbia and the Serbian Association for Legal and Social Philosophy. She previously worked as an associate researcher at the Edinburgh Law School from 2012 to 2013.

She was elected as a member of the Minor Council of the Do not let Belgrade drown (NDB) movement in 2020. Đorđević was the candidate of the We Must coalition, which NDB is part of, in the 2022 parliamentary election. She was elected to the National Assembly, and currently serves as the deputy president of the NDB parliamentary group since 1 August 2022. NDB was transformed into the Green–Left Front on 14 July 2023.

Đorđević supports decentralisation and wants to "radically turn things around". She also wants to reduce social inequality.

== Personal life ==
Đorđević has resided in Belgrade since finishing her studies at the University of Belgrade.
