= Bogdan Radovanović =

Serbian politician (born 1989)

- Богдан Радовановић

Member of the National Assembly of the Republic of Serbia
- Incumbent
- Assumed office 6 February 2024

Personal details
- Born: 10 October 1989 (age 36)
- Party: ZLF, Initiative for Požega

Bogdan V. Radovanović (Serbian Cyrillic: Богдан В. Радовановић; born 10 October 1989) is a Serbian politician. He has served in the National Assembly of Serbia since February 2024 as a member of the Green–Left Front (ZLF).

== Early life and career ==
Radovanović has a Bachelor of Laws degree. He was the director of a company in Sevojno for five years and afterward worked as a lawyer for Dunav auto. He lives in Požega.

== Politician ==
Radovanović was a founding member of the local Initiative for Požega (Inicijativa za Požegu, IZP) party in 2018. In 2021, Serbian prime minister Ana Brnabić accused the IZP of spreading false information about Serbian president Aleksandar Vučić's son; Radovanović later refuted this claim.

The IZP announced a co-operation agreement with Nebojša Zelenović's civic platform initiative (which later became the Akcija movement) in April 2021. Five IZP candidates later contested the 2022 Serbian parliamentary election as part of the We Must (Moramo) coalition electoral list. Radovanović was included in the eighty-sixth position and was not elected when the list won thirteen mandates.

In February 2023, Radovanović helped to bring the IZP into the Green–Left Front alliance at the republican level.

=== Parliamentarian ===
The Green–Left Front took part in the 2023 Serbian parliamentary election as part of the Serbia Against Violence (SPN) coalition. Radovanović appeared in the sixty-fifth position on the coalition's list and was elected when the list won exactly sixty-five mandates. The Serbian Progressive Party (SNS) and its allies won a majority victory, and the ZLF serves in opposition.

Radovanović is a member of the defence and internal affairs committee and a deputy member of the health and family committee, the committee on the rights of the child, and the committee on the judiciary, public administration, and local self-government.

=== Municipal representative ===
Radovanović led the IZP–ZLF into an alliance with the Democratic Party (DS) in Požega for the 2023 Serbian local elections, which took place concurrently with the parliamentary election. He led the resulting Požega Against Violence list and was elected when it won eleven seats. The SNS and its allies won the election, and Radovanović serves as an opposition deputy at the municipal level.

In February 2024, Radovanović called for a picture of Aleksandar Vučić to be removed from the municipal assembly.
