= BusPlus =

Payment system for Belgrade public transport

- Location: Belgrade
- Launched: 1 February 2012
- Discontinued: 13 April 2023
- Successor: Beograd plus
- Technology: RFID
- Operator: BusPlus
- Manager: BusPlus
- Currency: RSD
- Stored-value: Pay-Per-Ride
- Auto recharge: EasyPayXPress
- Unlimited use: Unlimited Ride
- Validity: GSP Belgrade Belgrade tram system BG TRAIN Lasta Beograd
- Variants: SingleRide Student Disabled/Senior Citizen Reduced Employee ID
- Website: www.busplus.rs

BusPlus (Serbian Cyrillic: БусПлус) was the payment method for the GSP Belgrade, Belgrade tram system, Lasta Beograd (only in public transport in Belgrade) and BG Voz. It is a thin, plastic card on which the customer electronically loads fares. BusPlus was managed by Apex Technology Solutions. Public authorities state that BusPlus was implemented to increase the revenue of the public transit authority and to improve the public transport system by getting better information on its usage. Reports from September 2012 have indicated that the overall revenue has increased, but some aspects of its integration have been criticized by the public. The system was installed by Kentkart, an automatic fare collection system integrator company. This system was abolished in April 2023 after Belgrade terminated the contract with the company Kentkart, which implemented the system, by the decision of Mayor Aleksandar Šapić. In May, a new system, Beograd plus, was established.

== History ==
- 29 August 2011 - Began issuing BusPlus card
- 31 January 2012 - Open Control Center "Bus Plus"
- 1 February 2012 - BusPlus started operating Commissioner for Information of Public Importance and Personal Data Protection bans data processing in BusPlus system
- 25 September 2012 - A new ban of the Commissioner for Information of Public Importance and Personal Data Protection prohibits processing of some data from scholars in BusPlus system
- 25 December 2014 - Major changes in the system have been announced to take place from January 2015.
- 29 August 2017 - Five years since the introduction of the system
- 29 May 2021 - A new contract was signed with the Kentkart company on system maintenance valid until 2034
- 7 July 2021 - A new public transport card has been introduced, which will be valid in parallel with the BusPlus card
- 29 August 2021 - Ten years since the introduction of the system
- 21 February 2023 - It was announced that the system will be abolished in the spring
- 13 April 2023 - In the City Council of Belgrade, Aleksandar Šapić's proposal to abolish BusPlus was adopted by a majority of votes. The proposal was explained by the fact that Belgrade receives too little income from the existing system, even though it invested as much as 250 million euros in it.
- 17 May 2023 - Beograd plus has officially replaced BusPlus as a public transport billing system

== Fares and BusPlus types ==
=== Personalized smart card ===
Personalized cards are limited in time Pre-paid (monthly and semimonthly). All customers paying monthly or semimonthly driving, are entitled to unlimited rides on all lines in the ITS 1 and / or ITS 2 in selected areas in the daily traffic (from 04:00 to 24:00 hours). The personalized card data stored on the cards subspecies (zone, ...), and tariffs are on the card's personal information and photo's for visual control. Personalized cards are not transferable to another user. Personalized card must be validated when entering the vehicle (check in).

=== Non-personalized smart card - electronic wallet ===
Non-personalized smart card is the type electronic wallet for a ride on public transport. The user card complements the desired amount of money, each achieved a run-off card with the amount that represents the price of the ride. These cards are not time limited and may subsequently be amended at all locations for sale. Non-personalized card must be validated when entering the vehicle (check in). Non-personalized smart card can be registered in the name of the user, but it can also be used by multiple users. By registering a non-personalized card one gets the opportunity to recharge the card through the web portal.

=== Paper contactless cards ===
Contactless paper tickets are sold and complement at all locations for sale. This type of card must be authenticated (validated) at the beginning of the trip (check in).

=== Paper tickets from the driver ===
This is an individual ticket for one ride. Sold by the driver.

== BusPlus application ==
BusPlus Application is a free app developed by "Apex Solution Technology" which allows its user to: Search for the nearest station, search for the station by number and search for the station by its name. When the station is selected a bubble will pop up with the list of all buses that go to that station (distance if using "Search for the nearest stations" option) as well as the location of those buses presented on a map. By clicking on a bus on the map you are able to see if the bus is articulated or if the bus has wheelchair support.

== BusPlus Customer Service Center ==
BusPlus call center (customer service) is an information service for users and their complaints. Customer Service works in close coordination and synchronization with the relevant departments of the city.

The main activities of customer service are as follows:

- Informing users about the types of cards
- Informing users about procedures and locations of issuance / extension / additions to cards
- Resolving user complaints
- Coordination of procedures of notification and sharing of information regarding the system and its use of the appropriate services

== BusPlus Benefit Programs(rewards program) ==
BusPlus card owners will be able to obtain discounts, special offers and benefits within BusPlus benefit programs.

== Security problem ==
- Personalized smart cards store personal data and therefore, there is a justified risk that data can be used for the purpose of which their owners did not consent or they are not aware of.

== Controversy ==
- Since its introduction in 2011, media often reports violence used by BusPlus controllers during ticket inspection.
