= Green–Left Front =

Political party in Serbia

Green–Left Front Зелено–леви фронт Zeleno–levi front
- Abbreviation: ZLF
- Co-presidents: Radomir Lazović; Biljana Đorđević
- Founders: Dobrica Veselinović; Radomir Lazović; Biljana Đorđević; Robert Kozma
- Founded: 14 July 2023; 3 years ago
- Registered: 10 August 2023
- Preceded by: Don't Let Belgrade Drown
- Headquarters: Patrijarha Gavrila 6/III, Belgrade
- Youth wing: Green Youth of Serbia
- Women's wing: Autonomous Women's Front
- Ideology: Green politics; Progressivism; Pro-Europeanism
- Political position: Left-wing
- European affiliation: European Greens
- International affiliation: Progressive International
- Colours: Dark green; Light green; Red
- Slogan: Ne damo Srbiju; ("We are not giving up Serbia")
- National Assembly: 0 / 250
- Assembly of Vojvodina: 3 / 120
- City Assembly of Belgrade: 5 / 110

Website
- zelenolevifront.rs

Green–Left Front (Serbian: Зелено–леви фронт, romanised: Zeleno–levi front, abbr. ZLF) is a political party in Serbia that advocates for green politics. It is the successor of the Don't Let Belgrade Drown association and four local citizens' groups. Radomir Lazović and Biljana Đorđević serve as the co-presidents of ZLF.

Formed in July 2023, and registered as a political party a month later, ZLF was one of the organisers of the 2023 Serbian protests. It later became part of the Serbia Against Violence coalition, which contested the parliamentary, Vojvodina provincial, and Belgrade City Assembly elections in December 2023. They won 10 seats in the National Assembly of Serbia and 14 seats in the City Assembly of Belgrade. Regarding the latter, their number of seats was reduced to five after the 2024 Belgrade City Assembly election. ZLF supported the student-led anti-corruption protests and did not contest the 2026 Serbian parliamentary election, instead backing the Student List, which won a majority; as a result, ZLF has no seats in the 15th National Assembly. The decision to back the Student List, and later the question of whether to field a candidate in the 2026 presidential election, exposed differences of opinion within the party.

ZLF is a left-wing and progressive party that declares itself to be supportive of solidarity, social justice, and environmental protection. It supports extending LGBTQ rights, proposes anti-gambling policies, and opposes the Rio Tinto project near Loznica and the privatisation of public transport in Belgrade. On foreign policy, they support the accession of Serbia to the European Union, while condemning the Russian invasion of Ukraine and the Gaza genocide. ZLF is a member of the Progressive International and the European Greens, while on the national level it cooperates with the Movement of Free Citizens.

== History ==
=== Formation ===
At the sixth congress of Don't Let Belgrade Drown (NDB) in June 2022, it was announced that NDB would transform itself into a political party that would be active on national level, as opposed to only being active in Belgrade. NDB also announced that several local organisations would take part in the foundation of the political party and that it would continue its actions within the We Must coalition. In early February 2023, it was announced that the political party would be named the Green–Left Front (ZLF) and that it would also utilise its slogan "We are not giving up Serbia" (Ne damo Srbiju). Radomir Lazović also announced that it would open local branches in Niš, Sombor, and Užice, while ZLF would also sign several cooperation agreements with local organisations in Serbia.

On 10 February 2023, NDB signed an agreement on joint participation with the Choice for our Municipality citizens' group. Four days later, it signed another agreement with the Critical Mass citizens' group. In late February 2023, it signed an agreement with the "Initiative for Požega", while in early June, it signed an agreement with the Local Front from Valjevo and the Initiative for Lajkovac. ZLF held its founding assembly on 14 July, during which the party adopted its statute and programme. Biljana Đorđević has said that ZLF would take part in the upcoming local elections.

=== 2023–2025 ===
After the Belgrade school shooting and Mladenovac and Smederevo shootings in May 2023, ZLF has taken part in the 2023 protests, as one of its organisers. ZLF became part of the Serbia Against Violence (SPN) coalition in October 2023, a coalition of political parties organising the 2023 protests. The SPN coalition announced that it would take part in the parliamentary, Vojvodina provincial, and Belgrade City Assembly elections, all scheduled for 17 December 2023. Lazović was placed first on its electoral list for the parliamentary elections, while Dobrica Veselinović was placed first for the Belgrade City Assembly election. In the parliamentary election, SPN won 65 seats, 10 of which went to ZLF. In the Belgrade City Assembly, they won 14 seats. After the elections, SPN called for the annulment of the results in Belgrade, with ZLF alleging electoral fraud, and organised protests up until 30 December.

In January 2024, the New Optimism political movement joined ZLF. When the National Assembly of Serbia and Assembly of Vojvodina were constituted, the SPN split into several parliamentary groups. The City Assembly of Belgrade, on the other hand, was not constituted because the quorum was not met during its constitutive session. A new Belgrade City Assembly election was then called for 2 June. SPN dissolved shortly after; ZLF and some opposition parties took part in the election under the We Choose Belgrade electoral list. Before the election, Veselinović said that ZLF would offer Kreni-Promeni a cooperation agreement. In the 2 June election, the We Choose Belgrade electoral list won 14 seats, five of which went to ZLF.

After the 2023 parliamentary election, the National Assembly formed a working body on improving election conditions. ZLF remained a member of the working body until January 2025, when they left, citing government obstruction. Since the beginning of the student-led anti-corruption protests, ZLF has supported the students. Following the resignation of Miloš Vučević as prime minister of Serbia in 2025, ZLF was one of the parties that supported the formation of a transitional government as an end to the education crisis started by the protests. Đorđević said that according to their plan, the transitional government would fulfil student demands, organise free and fair elections, and revise the voter list.

In November 2025, ZLF and the Movement of Free Citizens (PSG) signed a memorandum on cooperation. A month later, several opposition parties, including ZLF, signed a cooperation agreement regarding the accession of Serbia to the European Union. The bloc became known in the media as EU5.

=== 2026 ===
On 5 May 2026, ZLF's Grand Council (Veliko veće) decided by majority to back the Student List if snap parliamentary elections were held by the end of July, and ZLF consequently left the EU5 bloc. In June, Đorđević said that the decision would not be changed; she described it as a difficult one, as the party risked being subsumed into the student movement, but said that ZLF would not give up its identity. On 29 June, Jelena Jerinić resigned her seat in the National Assembly, saying that this followed from her election to the party Presidency; according to Danas, SNS officials and pro-government media presented the resignation as evidence of a serious internal conflict.

With no election expected before the end of July, members disagreed publicly over whether the support should lapse or be made permanent. MP Rastislav Dinić, who had opposed the original decision, wrote that continuing "unilateral" support without talks and an agreement with the Student List would be a mistake, pointing to a memorandum on Kosovo and to a rally speech in Kraljevo by independent MP Jelena Pavlović. Presidency member Marko Vujačić responded that Dinić spoke only for himself and that the Presidency had proposed to the Grand Council that the support be made permanent. Lazović said that nothing had changed regarding ZLF's support for the students and that members were free to hold personal views.

On 31 July 2026, ZLF decided to support the list nominated by the student movement in the next parliamentary election, saying that a broad coalition around the students was the best route to a change of government; it set out expectations including a commitment to European integration and "an unequivocal break with the SNS–SPS regime", while stating that it was not abandoning its own programme and political identity. The decision applied only to the parliamentary election, with ZLF saying that it would decide on other levels of elections in due course. On 9 September, after the 2026 Serbian parliamentary election was called for 25 October, ZLF confirmed that it would not run and would back the Student List. The election, held on 25 October 2026, was won by the Student List with 140 of the 250 seats, leaving ZLF without representation in the 15th National Assembly. At the end of the 14th Assembly's term, ZLF said that its parliamentary group had submitted 17 bills, one resolution and about 800 amendments during the term. Lazović said that ZLF would continue its political activity outside parliament and was ready to help the Student List in its parliamentary work.

On 9 November 2026, ZLF said that Lazović had been under covert surveillance by the Security Information Agency (BIA), whose agents, according to the party, had entered his apartment and car to install listening devices. Lazović announced legal action and called for the agency to be disbanded and its director, Vladimir Orlić, to be arrested. He also said that the BIA had acted on behalf of the SNS and that the question of banning the party should therefore be opened. On 16 November, Lazović said that ZLF had information that Đorđević had also been under BIA surveillance.

==== Presidential election dispute ====
Following Aleksandar Vučić's resignation as president on 27 September 2026, a presidential election has to be held by 27 December 2026. Members of ZLF publicly took opposing positions on whether the party should back the Student List's candidate or field its own. On 3 November, Veselinović said that political parties should nominate candidates for every office and that it would not be good for the opposition to have only one candidate, that of the Student List, adding that ZLF saw room for a candidacy of its own and that "Serbia deserves a female president" (Srbija zaslužuje predsednicu). The following day, ZLF member and law professor Svetislav Kostić called on the parties that had backed the Student List in the parliamentary election to also support its presidential candidate, "not because of the candidate, but because of the proposer", and argued that it was not yet time for parties to return to electoral competition without "deep reassessment and internal reform". On 6 November, Danas reported that ZLF had several differing proposals on the presidential election, while most other parties that had backed the Student List, including the Democratic Party and Kreni-Promeni, said they would support its candidate.

== Ideology and platform ==
ZLF is a green and progressive party; it declares itself to be supportive of solidarity, social justice, environmental protection, rights to public goods, and broad participation of citizens in decision-making. Researcher Jovica Pavlović has also described it as an environmentalist party. ZLF is considered to be a left-wing green and progressive party which stemmed from anti-neoliberal positions. Lazović stated that it is a left-wing political party, and that its ideology would be orientated towards principles of the "green left". He also noted that ZLF would be supportive of decentralisation, civic and human rights, and anti-fascism. At the sixth congress of NDB, it was announced that ZLF would be ideologically and programmatically similar to NDB itself. Political scientist Filip Balunović has described ZLF as a left-wing party, alongside journalist Saša Dragojlo, newspaper Danas, and Radio Free Europe.

=== Analysis ===
Political scientist Dušan Spasojević has described ZLF, alongside Croatia's Možemo, as part of a "new left" oriented toward post-materialist themes such as ecology and civil rights, distinct from the classical labour-oriented left. The party and its predecessor have also drawn criticism from the Serbian radical left, with the Trotskyist organisation Marks21, writing in 2020 about the NDB period, stating that after supporting NDB's 2018 Belgrade campaign it had advocated that the initiative turn toward the working class, and that the leadership had not adopted this direction. Dragojlo, writing in Mašina, has characterised the broader post-2000 opposition, including the green-left current, as rooted in an "urban (pseudo)middle-class" base disconnected from working-class voters.

=== Domestic issues ===
ZLF supports extending LGBTQ rights. In September 2023, they introduced a law to legalise same-sex civil unions to the National Assembly, while a year later, in September 2024, they proposed the creation of a LGBTQ centre in Belgrade. They have also proposed improving the education, social and health care of autistic people, including the creation of a national registry for people diagnosed with autism. ZLF has highlighted its anti-gambling positions. It has criticised the establishment of the cooperation between the Ministry of Health and the Mozzart Foundation, a gambling company, called for a ban on using cash in gambling, supported increasing taxes on gambling, and proposed a ban on gambling advertisements. In May 2025, ZLF presented its anti-corruption programme.

ZLF has pledged to stop exploitation and the destruction of the environment. They are also opposed to lithium mining and to the Rio Tinto project in Loznica. While opposition to the Rio Tinto Jadar lithium project is a core ZLF policy, the 2021–2022 environmental protests against the project were primarily led by Savo Manojlović and the centre-right movement Kreni-Promeni, with NDB (ZLF's predecessor) and Ecological Uprising participating as coalition partners rather than principal organisers. During the 2023 Vojvodina provincial election campaign, ZLF stated that they support further decentralisation, combating inequality, and preserving the environment in Vojvodina.

Regarding Belgrade, they have criticised and opposed the privatisation of the public transportation. ZLF also opposed the demolition of Hotel Jugoslavija and is opposed to the construction of Trump Tower Belgrade. In November 2026, after an arrest order was issued for two owners of the construction company Milenijum Tim over suspected unpermitted works at the Hotel Jugoslavija site, ZLF called on prosecutors to examine all of the company's dealings with the state and the city, describing it as an extension of the SNS.

ZLF opposed the erection of a monument and the establishment of a museum dedicated to World War II Axis collaborator, Draža Mihailović, which were unveiled in October 2023. They also oppose the introduction of mandatory military conscription.

=== Regional issues ===
ZLF condemned the Banjska attack that occurred in September 2023 in North Kosovo. Lazović said that ZLF would support establishing "a true autonomy for Serbs in Kosovo" (stvarnu autonomiju za Srbe na Kosovu) and that they would also partly support the 2023 Ohrid Agreement. In August 2025, ZLF and PSG were present at the 30 year commemoration of the Operation Storm that ended the Croatian War of Independence.

=== Foreign policy ===
ZLF supports the accession of Serbia to the European Union; it is also anti-militarist. They have denounced the Russian invasion of Ukraine and the Gaza genocide. Regarding the latter, they proposed a resolution to introduce sanctions for the export of weapons to Israel in October 2025.

== Organisation ==
ZLF is led by two co-presidents, Lazović and Đorđević. They were elected in November 2023, and re-elected for a three-year term at the party's third congress on 13 June 2026. Jelena Jerinić, Natalija Stojmenović, Marko Vujačić, Bogdan Radovanović, and Nikolina Drinić serve as members of its presidency. In its statute, ZLF stresses participatory democracy; researchers have described its internal organisation as participatory in practice. Its headquarters is located at Patrijarha Gavrila 6/III, Belgrade. Their headquarters were vandalised in December 2023. Lazović had also announced that ZLF will form youth, women, LGBT+, and elderly party wings; in June 2023, the Green Youth of Serbia formally joined ZLF as its youth wing, while in October 2023, the Autonomous Women's Front was formed as its women's wing. Lazović was the leader of the ZLF parliamentary group in the 14th National Assembly.

ZLF began collecting signatures to become a registered party on 18 May and on 19 June it was announced that they have collected 11,000 signatures. Regarding the finance costs for the registration of the party, Lazović said that NDB has mostly used membership donations but also public funds allocated for the functioning of the organisation. ZLF was registered on 10 August 2023.

=== International cooperation ===
From NDB, it has retained its candidate status to become a member of the European Greens. Jerinić, a ZLF member of the National Assembly, said that she expected ZLF to become a member of the European Greens at the next congress. ZLF representatives took part in the 37th European Greens congress in 2023. In December 2024, ZLF became a full member of European Greens. ZLF has also cooperated with the German Die Linke, a member of the Party of the European Left. They have also collaborated with Gergely Karácsony, the mayor of Budapest, and Meri Disoski, a politician from the Austrian Greens.

As the successor of NDB, it is also affiliated with the Progressive International.

=== List of presidents ===
#	Co-presidents	Birth–Death	Term start	Term end
1	Radomir Lazović	1980–	5 November 2023	Incumbent
1	Biljana Đorđević	1984–	5 November 2023	Incumbent

== Electoral history ==
=== Parliamentary elections ===
National Assembly of Serbia
Year	Leader	Popular vote	% of popular vote	#	# of seats	Seat change	Coalition	Status
2023	Radomir Lazović	902,450	24.32%	2nd	10 / 250	▲5	SPN	Opposition
2026	Radomir Lazović	Did not participate			0 / 250	▼10	Supported SL	Extra-parliamentary

=== Assembly of Vojvodina elections ===
Assembly of Vojvodina
Year	Leader	Popular vote	% of popular vote	#	# of seats	Seat change	Coalition	Status
2023	Tamara Maksić	215,197	22.55%	2nd	3 / 120	▲3	SPN	Opposition

=== Belgrade City Assembly elections ===
City Assembly of Belgrade
Year	Leader	Popular vote	% of popular vote	#	# of seats	Seat change	Coalition	Status
2023	Dobrica Veselinović	325,429	35.39%	2nd	14 / 110	▲4	SPN	Snap election
2024	Dobrica Veselinović	89,430	12.42%	▼3rd	5 / 110	▼9	BB	Opposition

== See also ==
- List of green political parties
- Media related to Green–Left Front at Wikimedia Commons
