= Dobrica Veselinović =

Serbian politician and activist (born 1981)

- Добрица Веселиновић
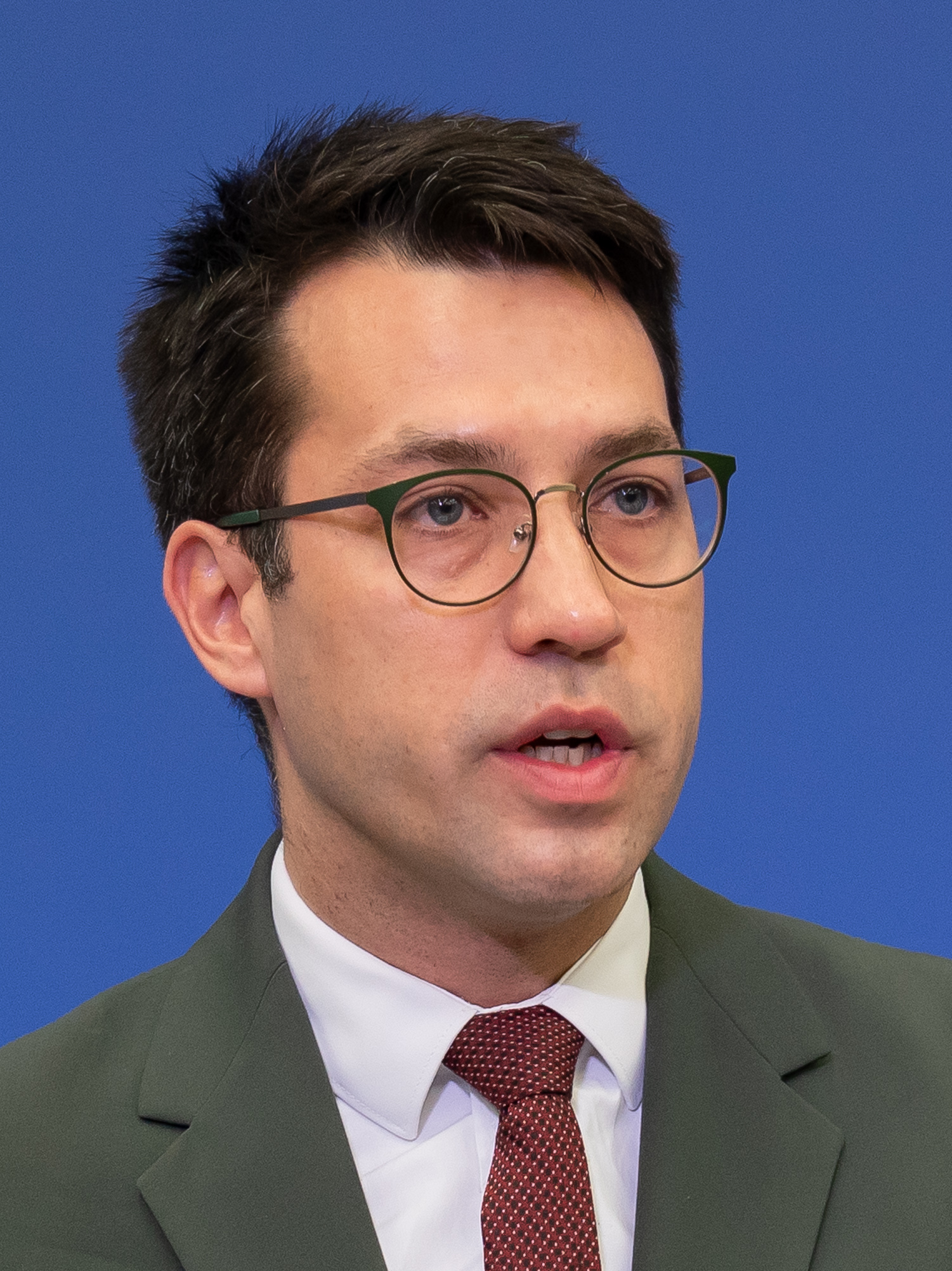
- Veselinović in 2025

Personal details
- Born: 27 July 1981 (age 45) Belgrade, SR Serbia, SFR Yugoslavia
- Party: NDB (until 2023); ZLF (since 2023)
- Education: University of Belgrade
- Occupation: Political activist

Dobrica Veselinović (Serbian Cyrillic: Добрица Веселиновић; born 27 July 1981) is a Serbian activist and politician. He is a member of the Green–Left Front and was previously affiliated with the left-wing Do not let Belgrade drown association.

== Early life ==
He was born on 27 July 1981 in Belgrade, SR Serbia, SFR Yugoslavia where he finished middle and high school. He graduated from the Faculty of Political Sciences, University of Belgrade.

== Activism ==
From 2004 to 2005 he was the program editor at "BU Radio", the radio of the Faculty of Political Sciences. He was the coordinator of the project "I don't want a bag, I want a ceger" and the campaign "I park arrogantly" in the group of citizens "KRIO" from 2008 to 2009. In the same period, he was an assistant coordinator at the Center for Peace Studies at the Faculty of Political Sciences in Belgrade.

From 2007 to 2010, he was the assistant coordinator of the project of translating and publishing books on peace studies in the group of citizens "Southeast 21". From 2009 to 2011 he worked for the group of citizens "Civic Initiative" as the coordinator of the projects "Info Center" and "Student Parliaments" and launched the campaign "Open about public spaces". From 2010 to 2011, he was one of the people behind "Street Gallery" project, together with Radomir Lazović. From 2011 to 2018, Veselinović was initiator of a collective "Ministry of space" which started advocating greater civic participation in urban development. Over the years grown from informal collective into a "Institute for urban policy" hub with six people fully employed and more than dozen people involved in numerous projects and initiatives.

From 2010 to 2012, he was the coordinator of the "EcoLog" project in the group of citizens "Creative Lab". Then, from 2013 to 2014, he was the local coordinator of the "Bureau Savamala" project, implemented in cooperation with the University of Zurich and the Goethe Institute in Belgrade. Between 2012 and 2014 he initiated "The Return of the Written off" campaign which dealt with the effects of the privatization of 16 cinemas in Belgrade. This resulted in the occupation of the independent cinema Novi Bioskop Zvezda. German Marshal Memorial Fellow class 2019, and part of European Young Leaders class of 2020.

== Politics ==
In 2014, he was one of the founders of the new political movement called Do not let Belgrade d(r)own. The movement has heavily criticized the Prime Minister of Serbia, Aleksandar Vučić and the new Belgrade Waterfront project which according to them, is an extremely harmful project. Veselinović and the movement have organized numerous protests in response to this project.

The movement has protested against the demolition in Savamala which was carried out, according to a witness, by individuals with phantom masks, at night between 24 and 25 April 2016 and the movement has organized 8 protests from 11 May 2016 to 15 February 2017.

Veselinović was a ballot carrier for the movement for the 2018 Belgrade City Assembly election, and they have finished sixth with 3.44% of the votes. In September 2019, the movement has announced that they will boycott the 2020 Serbian parliamentary election.

NDB transformed itself into the Green–Left Front on 14 July 2023.
