= 2017 Serbian protests =

Political protests in Serbia

- Part of 2017 Serbian presidential election
- Symbol of 2017 Serbian protest against dictatorship depicting Aleksandar Vučić's hand gesture
- Date: 3 April – 31 May 2017
- Location: Serbia
- Caused by: Accusations of electoral fraud; Media censorship; Authoritarianism of Aleksandar Vučić; Particracy and nepotism
- Goals: Removal of Vučić and Maja Gojković; Freedom of the media; Removal of party people from public service companies and administration; Improvements on labor rights
- Methods: Demonstrations, civil disobedience, civil resistance
- Result: Protests failed

Parties
| Anti-government protesters; "Against Dictatorship" civic movement; Civilian and student protesters | President of Serbia; Government of Serbia: Ministry of Internal Affairs of Serbia; Serbian Security Intelligence Agency |

Lead figures
| Unknown | Aleksandar Vučić |

Number
| up to 20,000 in Belgrade, 10,000+ in Novi Sad 3,000+ in Niš | Unknown |

The 2017 Serbian protests against perceived dictatorship were ongoing mass protests organized across Belgrade, Novi Sad, Niš and other cities and towns in Serbia, against Prime Minister Aleksandar Vučić, as a result of the presidential election. The election was marred by accusations of voter intimidation and a near total domination of Serbia's media by Vučić and his populist conservative Serbian Progressive Party. The protests started on 3 April and thousands of people had been gathering on the streets of Serbia's cities on a daily basis. They informed themselves via official Facebook protest pages.

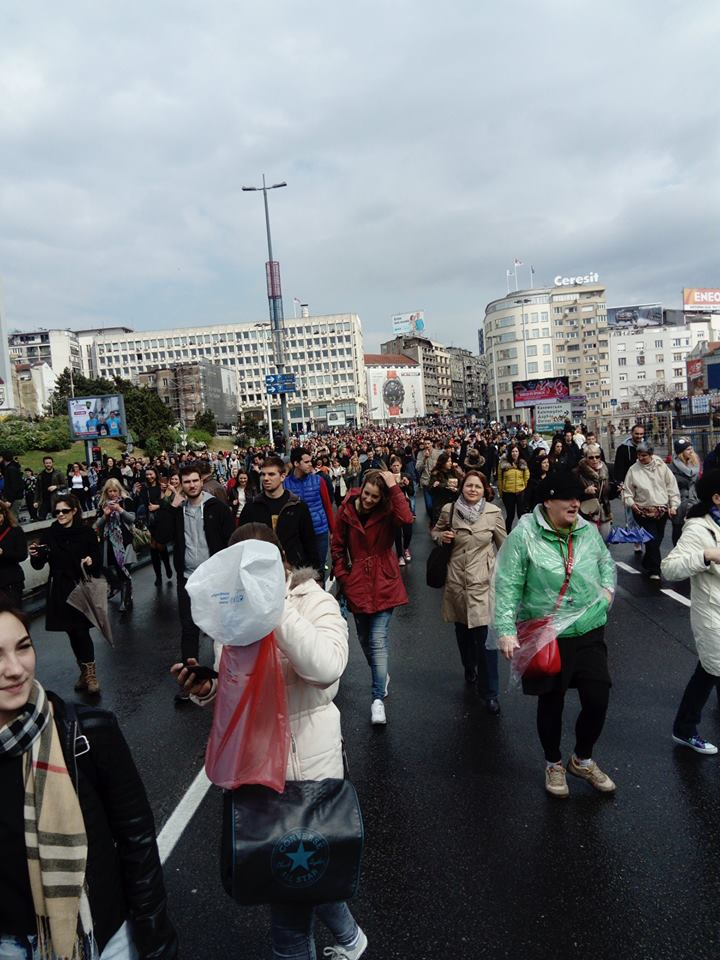
Anti-Vučić protest on 8 April in Belgrade

== Protests ==
The leading participants were university students, however on Saturday, 8 November, they were joined by the police syndicate, the army syndicate, taxi drivers, lawyers, postal office workers and other organizations who are protesting against the president-elect's authoritarian regime.

Protests erupted on 3 April when Nemanja Milosavljević, member of the hip hop group Middle Finger Kru under the stage name German, posted an event called Protest Against Dictatorship 2017 saying "Sloba also won an election, remember that", referring to the overthrow of Slobodan Milošević. On the first day, media reported up to 10.000 participants. Popular chants included "Vučić, you fag" and "Av av av" (Vučić's initials, also represents a barking sound). A group of protesters threw eggs at the National Assembly building and a makeshift wall displaying victims of the Kosovo War called the Serbian Wailing Wall was severely damaged causing public outrage.

During the 8 April protest, according to president of the Army union, there were more than 80.000 people in Belgrade walking against dictatorship. A set of demands have been presented to endorse a democratization of the country, including measures to limit and oversee the President-elect's firm control. Protestors also demand independent monitoring and a new assessment of the recent presidential election, with responsibility to be shouldered by "those responsible for any irregular campaign, as well for [any] irregularities during voting and counting." They also called for all "corrupt public officials" to quit, and for all media editors not respecting the press code to be held accountable.

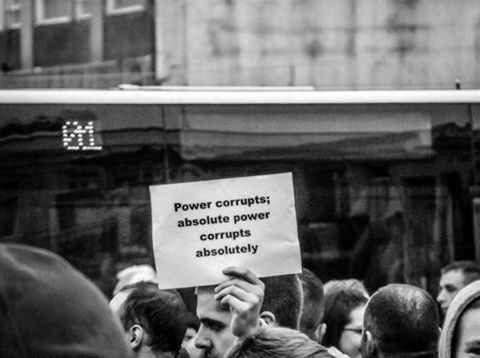
Protester holding Lord Acton's quote, referring to Aleksandar Vučić's absolute power

On 11 April, protests were joined by the NKPJ and left-wing union "Sloga". They protested against the "bad situation of worker class" and expulsion of their members from one Kruševac factory.

The largest protest so far was on 12 April. The protesters have called for a break due to the Easter in the demonstrations; the deadline for their ultimatum to the government was 17 April. Since their demands were not fulfilled, the demonstrations are continued after the Easter holidays. The media reported that there is a possibility of protest radicalization by blocking the major city streets, bridges and universities.

On 1 May, several thousand members of unions and left-wing parties, including New Communist Party of Yugoslavia, protested on International Workers' Day and supported the student protests. They protested against worker law and the International Monetary Fund, and for higher pay and better workers rights. In the meantime, the union "Sloga" also protested in Kruševac.

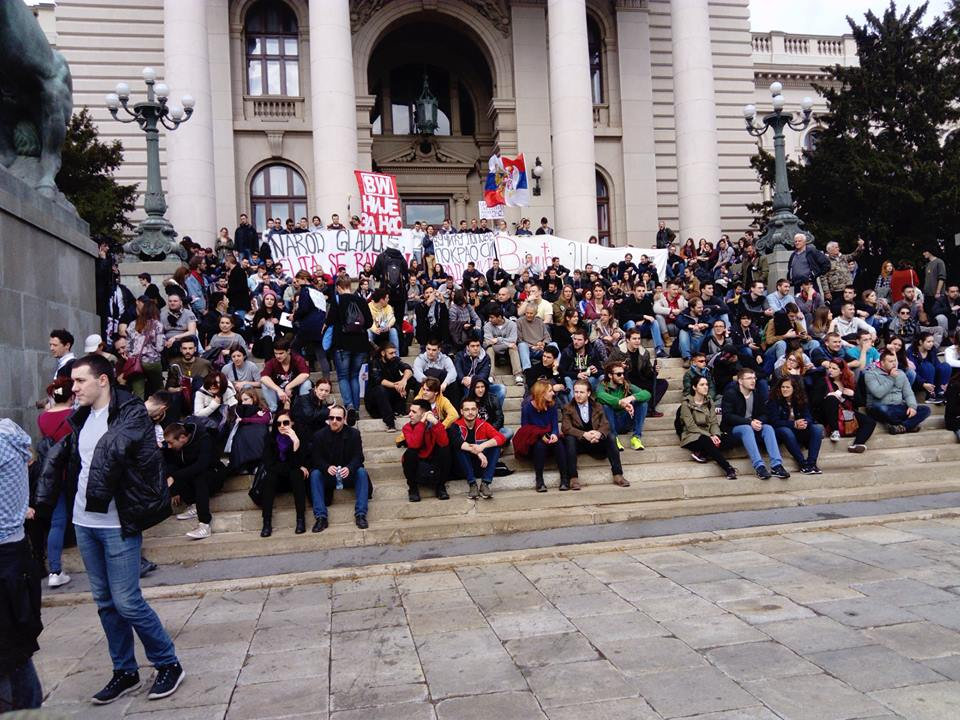
Protesters on the stairs of the National Assembly

On 31 May, the day of Vučić inauguration, there was opposition protest, as well the pro-government rally. There were large number of incidents on government rally, including attacks on journalists and anti-government protesters by SNS supporters and, so called, party parapolice members. On opposition protest were few thousand people from Belgrade, and on government rally was 10 000 people from entire Serbia.

== Organization ==
Protests were held without formal organization and leadership. Anyone could participate in deciding and voting via a Facebook group concerning next steps of protests. Walking routes were posted on the Facebook page and discussed on the spot. Due to a decline in number of people walking and "loss of meaning", group of protesters in Belgrade made a separate faction called "With Culture Against Dictatorship" which will continue in protesting. Another fraction called "Seven Demands" has been formed. An informal group of students dissatisfied with protesters who expressed a will to cooperate with the opposition in achieving the protest goals broke out of main group. They stated their will to pursue action for "Seven Demands" but without implications for political parties and politicians. In early May, a faction "Against Dictatorship" announced via their official Facebook page that they would protest once a week instead of every day.

== Protests in Niš ==
Protests broke out on 3 April. A few thousand protesters spontaneously gathered at Trg Kralja Milana to support the Belgrade protest which had been held earlier that day. On 5 April, at National Theatre in Niš, plato protesters announced a set of demands, the same as those in Belgrade. On the same day, protesters had been throwing eggs at a billboard from Aleksandar Vučić's presidential election campaign. On 13 April, protesters set local demands including stronger budgetary control of institutions, introduction of participatory budgeting at the municipal level, criminal prosecution of corrupt judicial officials, fiscal transparency, and stopping nepotism. On 17 April, protesters began funny chants towards the controversial disability pension of city major Darko Bulatović. On 18 April, protesters organized a performance by giving away fake PhD degrees to citizens, referring to plagiarism affairs involving public officials in Serbia.

== See also ==
- 2016 Serbian protests
- 2018–2020 Serbian protests
- 2024 Serbian environmental protests
