= Don't Let Belgrade Drown =

Political party in Serbia

Don't Let Belgrade Drown Не давимо Београд Ne davimo Beograd
- Abbreviation: NDB, NDMBGD
- Minor Council: Biljana Đorđević; Dobrica Veselinović; Natalija Simović; Radomir Lazović; Robert Kozma
- Founded: 22 July 2014
- Dissolved: 14 July 2023
- Succeeded by: Green–Left Front
- Headquarters: Belgrade
- Ideology: Green politics; Social democracy; Left-wing populism; Progressivism
- Political position: Left-wing
- European affiliation: European Greens (candidate)
- International affiliation: Progressive International
- Colours: Green
- Slogan: "Čiji grad, naš grad" ("Whose city, our city")

Website
- nedavimobeograd.rs

Don't Let Belgrade Drown (Serbian: Не давимо Београд, romanised: Ne davimo Beograd, NDB/NDMBGD), previously stylised as Don't Let Belgrade D(r)own (Serbian: Не да(ви)мо Београд, Ne da(vi)mo Beograd), was a green political organisation in Serbia.

A grassroots movement formed in 2014, aimed at criticising and reforming the current political system through "involving citizens in the development of their environment" and transparency. The organisation was made up of a group of people of different profiles, professions, and beliefs interested in urban and cultural policies, sustainable urban development, and equitable use of shared resources. In October 2022, NDB announced that together with local citizens' groups it would transform itself into a political party. It was succeeded by the Green–Left Front on 14 July 2023.

NDB was positioned on the left-wing on the political spectrum, and had adopted left-wing populist ideas, and an anti-neoliberal, anti-nationalist, progressive, municipalist, and egalitarian ideology. It maintained socialist and social-democratic economic policies, while it was also supportive of democratic socialism, and environmentalism. NDB described itself as a "green-left" organisation, while Radomir Lazović described NDB as a "transparent, democratic, solidarity[-based], green, and leftist movement". It was a member of the Progressive International.

== History ==
=== Early actions ===
Citizens of Belgrade have gathered around a civic initiative "Don't Let Belgrade D(r)own", whose trademark has become a big yellow duck. The initiative have organised a number of actions and protests to criticise the Belgrade waterfront urban project which, according to them, is an extremely harmful project. The public attention was drawn during the protest of 26 April and in 2015 in front of the Belgrade Cooperatives building, during the signing of the Belgrade Waterfront Contract. Then a crowd gathered with the intervention of the police enclosed by stopping two GSP trams in the middle of a roundabout in front of the Cooperative building.

The police have halted the performance of NDM BGD during the Belgrade Ship Carnival on 29 August 2015, when the duly registered vessel of the organisation was excluded from the procession only because of the prominent inscription "Don't Let Belgrade D(r)own".

=== Activities after the demolition in Savamala ===
As a result of the demolition of the facilities in Hercegovacka Street, which was carried out, according to a witness, by individuals with phantom masks, at night between 24 and 25 April 2016, this citizens' movement have organised 8 massive street protests from 11 May 2016 to 15 February 2017.

=== Participation in elections ===
During the 2017 presidential elections, the initiative has supported several candidates from opposition organisations, including Saša Janković.

This initiative participated in Belgrade assembly elections in 2018 under the list called "Initiative do not let Belgrade drown - Yellow duck - Whose city, our city - Ksenija Radovanović", introducing political platform regarding 20 agendas. The initiative's electoral efforts were supported by various local movements in municipalities across Serbia, the initiative's participation was also supported by Yanis Varoufakis with his movement DiEM25, from Barcelona's mayor Ada Colau, as well as a Croatian movement "Zagreb is OURS!".

The initiative got 3.44% of votes, which was not enough to gain threshold for entering the city's assembly (they needed 5% or higher). Best results were acquired in municipalities Stari Grad (8.06%), Vračar (7.47%) and Savski venac (6.56%).

=== Activities during the Coronavirus pandemic ===
On 26 April 2020, the initiative have called citizens to protest against growing authoritarianism in the country by banging pots every day at 20:05. On 28 April, the initiative have suggested the authorities to take better control on the traffic during the pandemic, to protect the cyclists from inconsiderate drivers.

=== Activities regarding the air pollution and environment ===
The initiative have taken serious stance toward the air pollution in Serbia. They have pointed out that the air quality stations are not working (not showing the current pollution). They have made protests in the Serbian capital Belgrade.

=== Other activities ===
Since 2016, the initiative became a part of a broader coalition of similar local initiatives across Serbia, such as:

- Civic front of Serbia, nationalwide coalition
- Local front, an initiative from Kraljevo
- Association of presidents of tenant assemblies, an initiative from Niš
- Bureau of Social Research, an initiative from Belgrade
- Support RTV (Radio television of Vojvodina), an initiative from Novi Sad
- League of Romani people
- Multi-ethnic centre for the region's development Danube 21, an initiative from Bor

Representatives of the initiative joined a working group to create a joint platform on fair elections and the media scene in Serbia at a meeting of the entire opposition on 12 October 2018. The movement later signed the agreement, which stemmed from these arrangements, and also took part in the One in Five Million protests.

== Electoral performance ==
=== Parliamentary elections ===
National Assembly of Serbia
Year	Popular vote	% of popular vote	#	# of seats	Seat change	Coalition	Status
2016	Election boycott			0 / 250	0	–	Extra-parliamentary
2020	Election boycott			0 / 250	0	–	Extra-parliamentary
2022	178,733	4.84%	▲5th	5 / 250	▲5	We Must	Opposition

=== Presidential elections ===
President of Serbia
Year	Candidate	1st round popular vote		% of popular vote	2nd round popular vote		% of popular vote	Notes
2017	Saša Janković	2nd	597,728	16.63%	—N/a	—	—	Supported Janković
2022	Biljana Stojković	6th	122,378	3.30%	—N/a	—	—	Supported Stojković

=== Belgrade City Assembly elections ===
City Assembly of Belgrade
Year	Popular vote	% of popular vote	#	# of seats	Seat change	Coalition	Status
2018	28,017	3.14%	▲6th	0 / 110	0	–	Extra-parliamentary
2022	99,078	11.04%	▲3rd	10 / 110	▲10	We Must	Opposition

== See also ==
- 2021 Serbian environmental protests
- Serbian protests (2020–2022)
- 2018–2020 Serbian protests
- 2017 Serbian protests
