= 2022 Serbian general election =

- 3 April 2022
- Opinion polls
- Presidential election
- Turnout: 58.63% (▲4.29 pp)
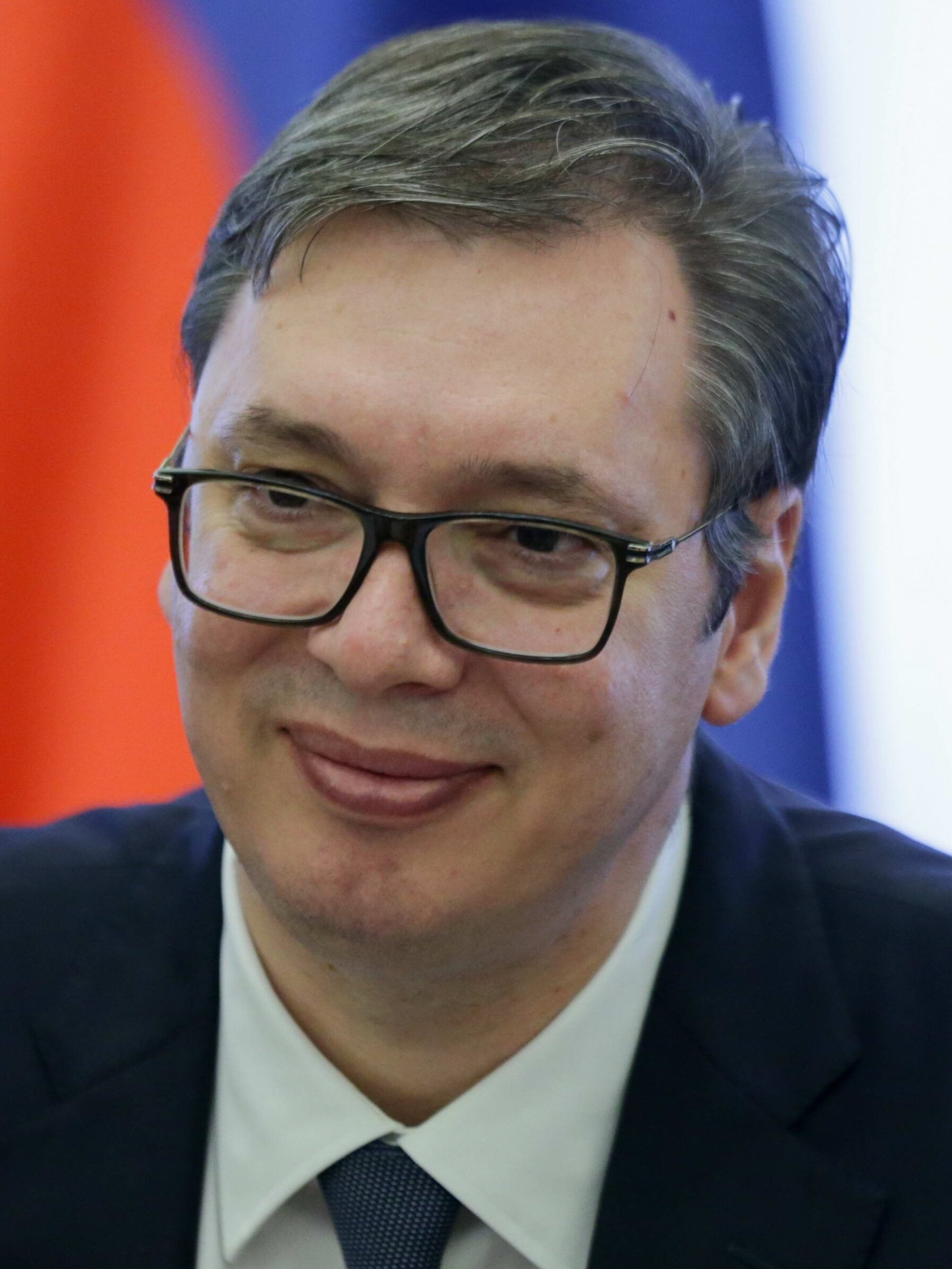

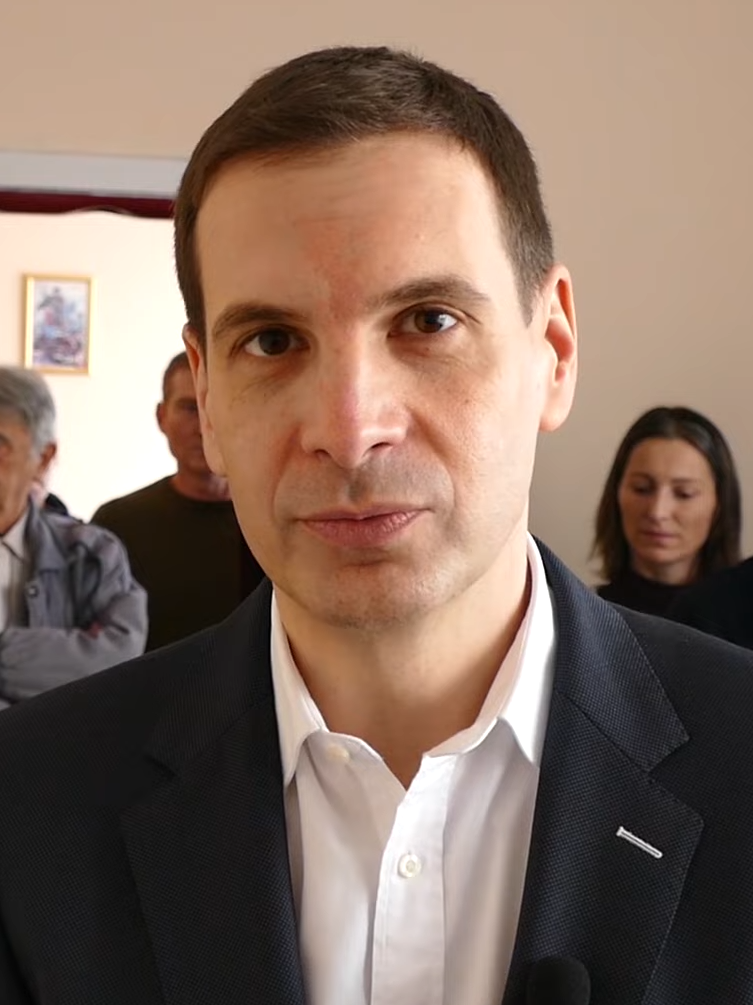
Candidate	Aleksandar Vučić	Zdravko Ponoš	Miloš Jovanović
Party	SNS	Narodna	DSS
Alliance	Together We Can Do Everything	United for the Victory of Serbia	National Democratic Alternative
Popular vote	2,224,914	698,538	226,137
Percentage	60.01%	18.84%	6.10%
President before election
Aleksandar Vučić
SNS
Elected President
Aleksandar Vučić
SNS
- Parliamentary election
- All 250 seats in the National Assembly; 126 seats needed for a majority
- Turnout: 58.53% (▲9.65 pp)
Electoral list	Leader	Vote %	Seats	+/–
AV–ZMS	Aleksandar Vučić	44.27	120	−68
UZPS	Marinika Tepić	14.09	38	New
SPS–JS–Zeleni	Ivica Dačić	11.79	31	−1
NADA	Miloš Jovanović	5.54	15	+15
Moramo	Nebojša Zelenović	4.84	13	New
Dveri–POKS	Boško Obradović	3.92	10	New
SSZ	Milica Đurđević Stamenkovski	3.82	10	+10
Minority lists
VMSZ	István Pásztor	1.63	5	−4
SPP	Usame Zukorlić	0.97	3	−1
DSHV–ZZV	Tomislav Žigmanov	0.65	2	+2
SDAS	Sulejman Ugljanin	0.56	2	−1
KSLP	Shaip Kamberi	0.28	1	−2
This lists parties that won seats. See the complete results below.
Prime Minister before	Prime Minister after
Ana Brnabić; SNS	Ana Brnabić; SNS
- Maps

General elections were held in Serbia on 3 April 2022 to elect both the president of Serbia and members of the National Assembly. Initially, parliamentary elections were scheduled to be held in 2024; however, in October 2020 president Aleksandar Vučić said that snap parliamentary elections would be held in or before April 2022. In addition to the general elections, local elections were held simultaneously in 12 municipalities and 2 cities, including Belgrade, the capital of Serbia.

The Serbian Progressive Party (SNS) came to power after the 2012 election when it formed a coalition government with the Socialist Party of Serbia. SNS won a supermajority of seats following the 2020 parliamentary election, which was boycotted by the major opposition Alliance for Serbia coalition that claimed that the election would not be free and fair. Vučić, who was elected president in 2017, faced protests during his first term, most notably during 2018–2020 and in July 2020. The government also oversaw the inter-party dialogues regarding electoral conditions which took place in 2021, while the agreement regarding the conditions between the government and opposition parties was reached in October 2021. Over the course of 2021 and early 2022, environmental protests were also held, reaching a climax in November and December 2021. A constitutional referendum, held in January 2022, was approved by 60 percent of the voters, although the turnout was 30 percent.

The campaign period was met with polarisation. Some organisations noted that the ruling party dominated the media, although news channels organised debates and political programme presentations during this period. Candidates concentrated on issues such as fighting against corruption, emphasising the rule of law, as well as issues regarding the economy, environment, and infrastructure. The Republic Electoral Commission confirmed that 19 parliamentary lists and eight presidential candidates registered to participate in the general elections.

Vučić won 60 percent of the votes in the first round of the presidential election, while Zdravko Ponoš, the candidate of the United for the Victory of Serbia coalition, placed second. The coalition around SNS lost its majority in the National Assembly, although 12 ballot lists crossed the threshold and entered the National Assembly. Multiple non-governmental organisations noted the occurrence of election irregularities during the election day. According to the Parliamentary Assembly of the Council of Europe, an uneven playing field favoured the incumbents, as they had unbalanced access to the media, pressured public sector employees to support the incumbents, enjoyed significant campaign finance disparities, and misused state resources to bolster their support. Ana Brnabić, who had been the prime minister since 2017, and her cabinet were inaugurated in October 2022.

== Background ==
A populist coalition led by the Serbian Progressive Party (SNS) and supported by the Socialist Party of Serbia (SPS), came to power after the 2012 parliamentary election. Aleksandar Vučić, who was appointed as deputy prime minister in 2012, was elected prime minister after the 2014 election, and finally elected as president in 2017, winning 55% of the popular vote. Since he came to power, observers have assessed that Serbia has suffered from democratic backsliding into authoritarianism, followed by a decline in media freedom and civil liberties. Mass protests began after his election in 2017 due to the alleged dominant control of Serbia's media by Vučić. Subsequently, he appointed Ana Brnabić as the new head of government, who initially served as an independent but later joined SNS in 2019.

The assassination of opposition politician Oliver Ivanović and an assault on another opposition politician Borko Stefanović triggered the start in late November 2018 of long-lasting anti-government protests, which ended in March 2020 due to the proclamation of COVID-19 lockdowns. These protests helped to strengthen the unity of opposition forces, of which the Alliance for Serbia (SZS) was the biggest and most prominent, while demonstrators demanded the resignation of Vučić and other senior officials. Parallel to this, Vučić launched the "Future of Serbia" rallies in 2019. Journalist Slobodan Georgiev noted that the rallies effectively silenced the protests. SZS declared that they would boycott the 2020 parliamentary election, citing that the conditions were not free and fair.

The SNS-led ballot list, named "For Our Children", won a supermajority of votes and seats in the June 2020 parliamentary election, while the government was formed in late October 2020. Following the election, Vučić stated that snap parliamentary elections would be held in or before April 2022. Shortly after the election ended, protests erupted in Belgrade. These anti-government protests were marked with police brutality and violence orchestrated by the government, while the protesters were divided between taking peaceful and violent approaches. The protests lasted until early August 2020, while some sporadic protests continued to be organised until late 2020. SZS was challenged with inter-coalition conflicts that remained active until its dissolution in August 2020. The United Opposition of Serbia (UOPS) was formed as a direct successor to the SZS shortly after. The coalition was also faced with inter-coalition conflicts, and due to their ideological differences, the coalition ended up being dissolved between December 2020 and January 2021. It was split into two blocs, which were headed by the Party of Freedom and Justice (SSP) and People's Party (Narodna).

=== Inter-party dialogues on electoral conditions ===
The dialogues between opposition and government parties to improve election conditions began on 28 April 2021. Opposition parties that had negative opinions regarding the European Union decided to not participate in talks with delegators from the European Parliament. Parties that declined to take part in talks with delegators from the European Parliament were a part of work board dialogues, which began on 18 May 2021. The talks with delegators from the European Parliament began on 9 July 2021.

Members of the European Parliament Tanja Fajon, Vladimír Bilčík and Knut Fleckenstein met with Vučić in Belgrade on 9 July 2021. Soon after, the discussion began with Vladimir Orlić, Sandra Božić, and Marijan Rističević representing SNS. After the meeting, delegators filed a proposal to improve electoral conditions. The draft document was released to the parties on 1 September 2021. SSP, Narodna, Movement for Reversal (PZP), Movement of Free Citizens (PSG), New Party (Nova), and the Together for Serbia (ZZS) opposition political parties criticised the draft document, while Vučić stated that "he isn't thrilled" with the document. Vučić and Dačić met again with the delegators on 17 September; Vučić and Đorđe Milićević, the head of the SPS parliamentary group, confirmed that they would accept the suggestions in the new draft document. Opposition political parties rejected the draft and soon after abandoned the dialogues. Dačić announced that the government accepted the suggestions of forming a media monitoring body and the change in the composition of the Republic Electoral Commission (RIK). On 20 September 2021, Dačić stated that the inter-party dialogue with the participation of delegators from the European Parliament had ended.

On 27 August 2021, Dačić announced that the electoral threshold would remain at 3%. In early September 2021, political parties that took part in work board dialogues had received the draft document regarding the improvement of electoral conditions. Democratic Party of Serbia (DSS), Dveri, and POKS gave mixed responses to the document. The signatory meeting was initially supposed to be held on 11 September, although it was later delayed to late October. Representatives of DSS, Dveri, POKS, Enough is Enough (DJB), Healthy Serbia (ZS), and Serbian Radical Party (SRS) took part in the signatory meeting which was held on 29 October 2021. In the final document, it was agreed that the minimum number of collected signatories for minority ballot lists would be lowered from 10,000 to 5,000; more funding would be given to participants in elections; the obligation to post a financial guarantee for the participants would be abolished; the right of free use of all halls of local communities for pre-election activities for opposition parties would be given; electoral campaigns would be prohibited from ten days before the election date; fees would be increased for polling station staff; and the Regulatory Body of Electronic Media (REM) and Election Commission would receive composition changes. SNS declined to organise parliamentary and presidential elections on different days and to change rules regarding the ballot representatives, although it had offered to not open any "roads and factories" a week before the election date.

=== Constitutional referendum ===
Shortly after the 2020 parliamentary election, the government submitted a proposal to change the constitution to the National Assembly. The National Assembly adopted the proposal in December 2020, while the document received further amendments up to June 2021. For the proposed changes to be adopted, a referendum needed to take place; it was initially announced that it would be held in fall of 2021, although the date was later settled for 16 January 2022. In November 2021, changes to the law on referendum and people's initiative were adopted by the National Assembly; the changes would abolish the 50% turnout that was needed for referendums to be considered valid. Vučić signed the law on 25 November, although the law was also amended in December 2021.

SNS and SPS voiced their support for the constitutional changes, while the opposition were divided in opinion. A majority of opposition parties stated their opposition to the changes and called for citizens to vote against the proposed changes, while SSP, Democratic Party (DS), and Party of Democratic Action of Sandžak (SDAS) called to boycott the referendum. Nevertheless, analysts had concluded that the campaign would be restrained due to the April 2022 general election and that a possibility of abuse of the referendum would be possible. In the end, a majority of voters voted in favour of changes, although the turnout was reported to be only 30%. A majority of voters in Belgrade, Novi Sad and Niš voted against the proposed changes. Irregularities were reported at voting stations, while some non-governmental organisations, such as the Centre for Research, Transparency, and Accountability (CRTA), and opposition parties, such as DJB, claimed voter fraud.

=== Environmental protests ===
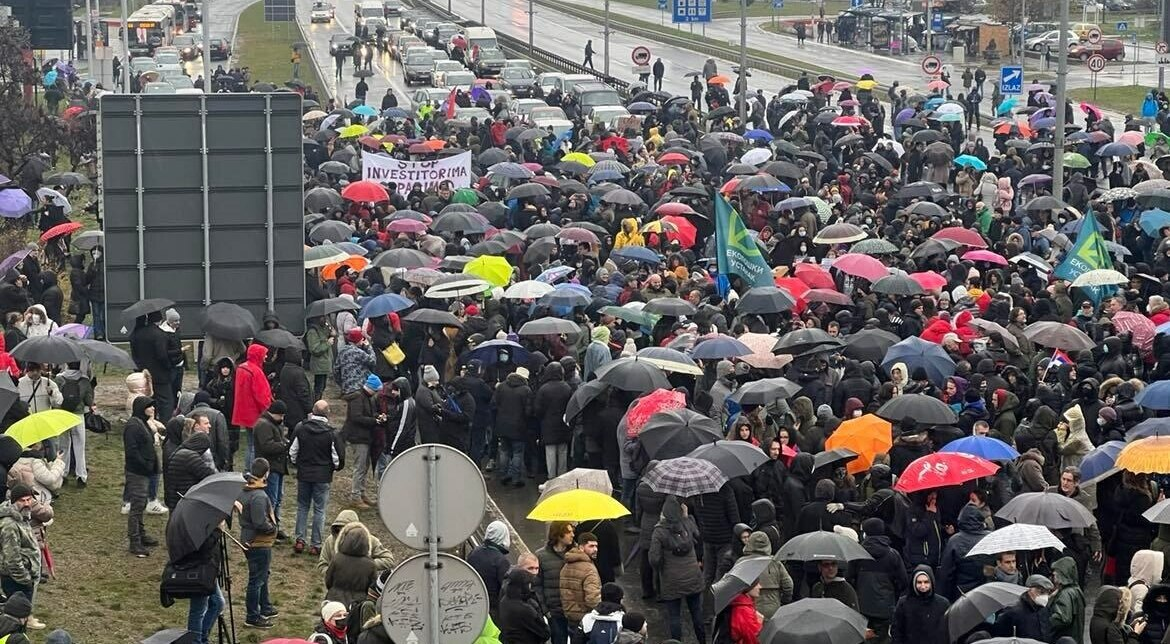
Protests in Belgrade on 11 December 2021

Rio Tinto, an Anglo-Australian mining corporation, had operated in Serbia since 2004 and it explored mines near the Jadar Valley. The government of Serbia signed an agreement in 2017 to implement Project Jadar, which would give Rio Tinto permission to exploit the jadarite mineral. Environmental protests in Serbia were held as early as in January 2021, although the protests that began in September 2021 garnered national attention. Environmental organisations and groups demanded the government to withdraw the referendum and expropriation laws, as well as to cancel Project Jadar. The protests resumed in November 2021, and peaked in late November and early December 2021. A series of roadblocks protests were held during that period and they ended up turning violent. Following the protests in early December 2021, the government withdrew the expropriation law and abolished the spatial plan for Project Jadar. Protests were organised up to 15 February 2022. Protests in support were also organised internationally. The government criticised the protests and its organisers.

== Electoral system ==
The president of Serbia is elected using the two-round system and has a term of five years, although it is limited to two terms in any order of service. If no candidate receives a majority of the vote in the first round, a second is held. An official candidate needs to collect 10,000 signatures, be at least 18 years old and possess Serbian citizenship. It is not necessary to have been born in Serbia.

The 250 members of the National Assembly are elected by closed-list proportional representation from a single nationwide constituency. Seats are allocated using the d'Hondt method with an electoral threshold of 3% of all votes cast, although the threshold is waived for ethnic minority parties. Minority ballots need at least 5,000 signatories to qualify on the ballot while non-minority ballots need 10,000. As of 2020, 40% of the candidates on the electoral lists must be female.

On 15 February 2022, Dačić called local elections to be held, while Vučić then dissolved the National Assembly and called parliamentary elections to be held on 3 April 2022. Presidential elections were called on 2 March. The Serbian diaspora was able to vote in 34 countries, although, elections in Canada, the United Kingdom, and the United States were held on 2 April due to time zone differences. Albin Kurti, the prime minister of Kosovo, stated that his government would try to find a solution for the elections with ambassadors of European Union, and he also expressed his support that Kosovar Serbs who possess Serbian citizenship should have the right to vote in the general election. RIK had announced that Kosovar Serbs would have the right to vote in four municipalities in Serbia.

=== Political parties ===
The table below lists political parties and coalitions elected in the National Assembly after the 2020 parliamentary election.

Name	Ideology	Political position	Leader	2020 result	
Name	Ideology	Political position	Leader	Votes (%)	Seats
SNS–led coalition	Populism	Big tent	Aleksandar Vučić	60.65%	188 / 250
SPS–JS–Zeleni–KP	Populism	Big tent	Ivica Dačić	10.38%	32 / 250
Serbian Patriotic Alliance	National conservatism	Right-wing	Aleksandar Šapić	3.83%	11 / 250
Alliance of Vojvodina Hungarians	Hungarian minority interests		István Pásztor	2.23%	9 / 250
SPP–DPM	Bosniak minority interests; Macedonian minority interests		Muamer Zukorlić	1.04%	4 / 250
Party for Democratic Action	Albanian minority interests		Shaip Kamberi	0.82%	3 / 250
SDA Sandžak	Bosniak minority interests		Sulejman Ugljanin	0.77%	3 / 250

=== Pre-election composition ===
A chart showing the composition of the National Assembly of Serbia before its dissolution on 15 February 2022
Party	Seats
For Our Children	180
SPS–Zeleni	24
Party of United Pensioners of Serbia	9
Alliance of Vojvodina Hungarians	9
United Serbia	8
Social Democratic Party of Serbia	8
PDD–SDAS	6
SPP–USS	5
Independent	1
Source: National Assembly of Serbia

== Electoral lists ==
The following were the official electoral lists published by the Republic Electoral Commission (RIK). Four additional electoral lists were rejected by RIK.

^{M} — National minority list

#	Ballot name	Ballot carrier (Note: Under Article 69 of the Law on the Election of Members of Parliament, the ballot carrier (nosilac liste) is the person whose name is included in the name of the electoral list; they may, but need not, be a candidate on it.)	Main ideology	Political position	Signatures	Note
1	Aleksandar Vučić — Together We Can Do Everything; SNS, SDPS, PS, PUPS, PSS–BK, SNP, SPO, NSS, USS, BS	Aleksandar Vučić (Note: Danica Grujičić is the first candidate on the list.)	Populism	Big tent	57,007	
2	Ivica Dačić — Prime Minister of Serbia; SPS, JS, Zeleni	Ivica Dačić	Populism	Big tent	22,714	
3	Alliance of Vojvodina Hungarians — István Pásztor; VMSZ/SVM	István Pásztor (Note: Bálint Pásztor is the first candidate on the list.)	Hungarian minority interests	Centre-right	8,743	^{M}
4	Dr Vojislav Šešelj – Serbian Radical Party; SRS	Vojislav Šešelj	Ultranationalism	Far-right	11,239	
5	Marinika Tepić — United for the Victory of Serbia; SSP, Narodna, DS, PSG, PZP, VMDK/DZVM, Fatherland, USS Sloga, SMS, VS, PSS	Marinika Tepić	Anti-corruption	Centre	13,007	
6	Dr Miloš Jovanović — NADA for Serbia – Serbian Coalition NADA — National Democratic Alternative — Democratic Party of Serbia – For the Kingdom of Serbia — Vojislav Mihailović; DSS, ZKS, (Note: Due to a dispute between Vojislav Mihailović and Žika Gojković, Mihailović had to register under the "For Kingdom of Serbia" organisation because, at the time of the election, Gojković still legally represented the leadership of POKS.) BGS	Miloš Jovanović; Vojislav Mihailović (Note: Božidar Delić is the first candidate on the list.)	National conservatism	Right-wing	11,222	
7	Milica Đurđević Stamenkovski – Serbian Party Oathkeepers; SSZ	Milica Đurđević Stamenkovski	Ultranationalism	Far-right	10,968	
8	Mufti's Legacy – Justice and Reconciliation Party – Usame Zukorlić; SPP	Usame Zukorlić	Bosniak minority interests		5,056	^{M}
9	We Must — Action – Ecological Uprising — Ćuta – Do not let Belgrade drown – Nebojša Zelenović; NDB, ZZS, EU, IZNO, Solidarity, FRS	Aleksandar Jovanović Ćuta; Nebojša Zelenović	Green politics	Centre-left to left-wing	12,236	
10	Sovereignists — Saša Radulović — Milan Stamatović — dr Jovana Stojković; DJB, ZS, ŽZS	Saša Radulović; Milan Stamatović; Jovana Stojković	Right-wing populism	Right-wing to far-right	10,104	
11	Boško Obradović — Serbian Movement Dveri – POKS – Miloš Parandilović — Patriotic Bloc for the Restoration of the Kingdom of Serbia; Dveri, POKS	Boško Obradović; Miloš Parandilović	Serbian nationalism	Right-wing to far-right	10,469	
12	Together for Vojvodina – Vojvodinians (Democratic Alliance of Croats in Vojvodina, Together for Vojvodina); DSHV, ZZV	None (Note: Tomislav Žigmanov is the first candidate on the list.)	Croat minority interests		5,237	^{M}
13	SDA of Sandžak – dr Sulejman Ugljanin; SDAS	Sulejman Ugljanin (Note: Enis Imamović is the first candidate on the list.)	Bosniak minority interests	Right-wing	≈7,000	^{M}
14	Boris Tadić — Come on People – Social Democratic Party – New Party – 1 of 5 million – Tolerance of Serbia – United Green Movement of Serbia – Bosniak Civic Party – Party of Montenegrins; SDS, Nova, #1od5m, TS, UPZS, BGS, SC	Boris Tadić (Note: Goran Radosavljević is the first candidate on the list.)	Social liberalism	Centre to centre-left	10,537	
15	Alternative for Changes – Albanian Democratic Alternative; APN/AZP	None (Note: Shqiprim Arifi is the first candidate on the list.)	Albanian minority interests		5,176	^{M}
16	Albanian Coalition of Preševo Valley; PVD/PDD, PD, LPD	None (Note: Shaip Kamberi is the first candidate on the list.)	Albanian minority interests		5,804	^{M}
17	Stolen Babies – Ana Pejić; OBAP	Ana Pejić	Anti-baby trafficking		10,120	
18	Roma Party — Srđan Šajn; RP	Srđan Šajn (Note: Srđan Šajn is not a candidate; Saćip Saćipović is the first candidate on the list.)	Romani minority interests		5,024	^{M}
19	Russian Minority Alliance – Milena Pavlović, Pavle Bihali Gavrin (Serbo-Russian Movement, Serbo-Russian Party Wolves, Movement of Greeks Srbiza); SRP, (Note: The Serbo-Russian Movement is made up of the Leviathan Movement, two political parties and ten organisations.) SRPV, PGS	Milena Pavlović; Pavle Bihali Gavrin (Note: Dušan Marković is the first candidate on the list.)	Neo-fascism	Far-right	≈5,100	^{M}

== Presidential candidates ==
=== Declared candidates ===
The following were the official presidential candidates published by RIK. Random draw was held on 18 March to determine the order of names on ballot papers.

#	Candidate	Affiliation	Background	Signatures
1	Miša Vacić	Serbian Right	Leader of the Serbian Right (2018–present)	10,151
2	Biljana Stojković	We Must (Note: Also endorsed by the Civic Democratic Forum.)	Professor at the Faculty of Biology, University of Belgrade	10,585
3	Branka Stamenković	Sovereignists	Member of the National Assembly (2016–2020); President of the Enough is Enough (2018–2019)	10,046
4	Zdravko Ponoš	United for the Victory of Serbia	Vice President of the People's Party (2017–2021); Chief of Cabinet of the president of the UN General Assembly (2012–2013); Assistant Minister of Foreign Affairs (2010–2012); Chief of the General Staff of Serbian Armed Forces (2006–2008)	11,786
5	Milica Đurđević; Stamenkovski	Serbian Party Oathkeepers	President of the Serbian Party Oathkeepers	11,102
6	Aleksandar Vučić	Serbian Progressive Party (Note: Also nominated by the Socialist Party of Serbia and Alliance of Vojvodina Hungarians. The candidate had also received support from the Serbian Radical Party and Justice and Reconciliation Party.)	President of Serbia (2017–present); Prime Minister of Serbia (2014–2017); Deputy Prime Minister of Serbia (2012–2014)	148,846
7	Miloš Jovanović	NADA	President of the Democratic Party of Serbia (2016–present); Member of the National Assembly (2012–2013)	11,232
8	Boško Obradović	Dveri–POKS	President of the Serbian Movement Dveri (2015–present); Member of the National Assembly (2016–2020)	11,020

=== Withdrawn candidacies ===
The following people confirmed their candidacies, although they either failed to collect enough signatures.

- Aleksandar Banjanac, nominated by the New Communist Party of Yugoslavia (NKPJ)
- Dragoslav Šumarac, nominated by the Social Democratic Party (SDS)
- Miladin Ševarlić, nominated by the "Strength of the Unity of the People of Serbia", which was led by Branimir Nestorović
- Srđan Škoro, independent candidate
- Vladimir Vuletić, nominated by the "Black on White" movement

=== Declined to be candidates ===
The following individuals were the subject of speculation about their possible candidacy but publicly denied interest in running.

- Aleksandar Kavčić, university professor and philanthropist
- Aleksandar Vulin, Minister of Internal Affairs (2020–2022)
- Boris Tadić, president of SDS (2014–present); former president of Serbia (2004–2012)
- Božidar Delić, retired general and former vice-president of the National Assembly (2007–2012)
- Branimir Nestorović, pulmonologist and conspiracy theorist; leader of the "Knights of the Order of the Dragon" movement
- Dragan Bjelogrlić, actor; film producer
- Grigorije Durić, Serbian Orthodox bishop; head of the Eparchy of Düsseldorf and all of Germany (2018–present); head of the Eparchy of Zahumlje and Herzegovina (1999–2018)
- Ivica Dačić, President of the National Assembly (2020–2022); Prime Minister of Serbia (2012–2014); first Deputy Prime Minister (2008–2012; 2014–2020)
- Marinika Tepić, vice-president of SSP; member of the National Assembly (2016–2020)
- Milan St. Protić, Mayor of Belgrade (2000–2001); Yugoslav ambassador to the United States (2001); Serbian ambassador to Switzerland (2009–2014)
- Miodrag Majić, legal scholar and judge of the Court of Appeals
- Miodrag Zec, professor at University of Belgrade
- Miroslav Aleksić, Vice-President of Narodna; member of the National Assembly (2016–2020); mayor of Trstenik (2012–2016)
- Mlađan Đorđević, businessman, former advisor to president Boris Tadić and former deputy minister
- Nebojša Zelenović, President of ZZS (2016–2022); Mayor of Šabac (2014–2020)
- Nikola Sandulović, businessman, President of the Republican Party (2015–present)
- Rasim Ljajić, Deputy Prime Minister of Serbia (2012–2020)
- Savo Manojlović, lawyer; activist; one of the leaders of the 2021–2022 Serbian environmental protests
- Siniša Kovačević, Vice-President of Narodna
- Vojislav Šešelj, President of SRS (1991–present); deputy Prime Minister (1998–2000)
- Vuk Jeremić, President of Narodna (2017–present); minister of foreign affairs (2007–2012); president of the United Nations General Assembly (2012–2013)

== Campaign ==
Non-governmental organisations assessed that polarisation was present during the electoral campaign period. The Bureau of Social Research (BIRODI) claimed that the pro-government media dominated during the period, while Transparency Serbia claimed that the ruling party had a significant domination in the media. According to multiple researches that were conducted by BIRODI, the media became vehicles of propaganda. CRTA stated that the electoral campaign period was allegedly in worse conditions than during the campaign period of the 2020 parliamentary election. The pre-election delegation of the Parliamentary Assembly of the Council of Europe (PACE) had stated that the atmosphere during the campaign remained calm and that all political contestants were able to campaign freely. It had also expressed concern over possible pressure on voters and fear of irregularities on election day. The Temporary Supervisory Body, which is operated by REM, claimed that BIRODI and CRTA published claims which were not substantiated.

To boost the electoral turnout, CRTA cooperated with the Nova S television channel by creating the Zato, glasaj! show. The Radio Television of Serbia, among other news channels, organised debates and program presentations during the campaign. Multiple non-governmental organisations also announced their participation in monitoring the elections, such as ENEMO, CRTA, CeSID, OSCE, and delegates from PACE. Opposition parties also hired election controllers to lower the potential of electoral fraud; CRTA announced that it had hired 3,000 election observers for the election. During the last campaign week, organisations noted the appearance of "phantom voters", signalling potential electoral fraud. The election silence began on 1 April, and it lasted until the closure of polling stations on 3 April. Transparency Serbia noted that the campaign period was the most expensive one since 2004.

=== Participating parties and coalitions ===
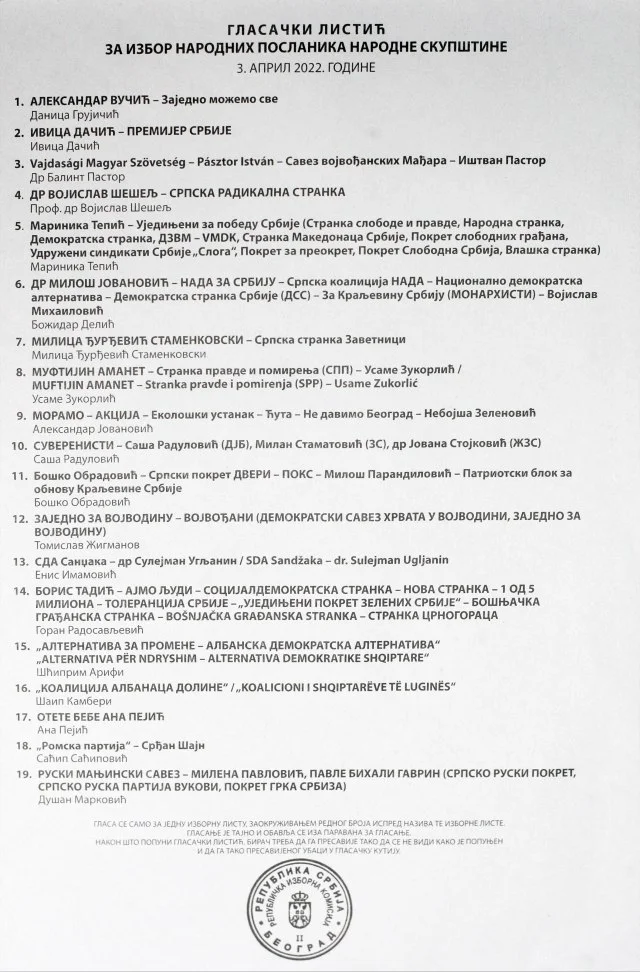
The parliamentary election ballot which contains all 19 ballot lists.

SNS and its coalition partners secured a supermajority in the parliament after the 2020 parliamentary election, with no official opposition represented in the parliament itself. In early May 2021, Vučić sent a proposal to Aleksandar Šapić, the leader of the Serbian Patriotic Alliance (SPAS), about the merger of two parties. Šapić announced his willingness to merge his party into SNS, and the merge occurred on 26 May. He was subsequently promoted to vice-president of SNS, while its MPs joined the SNS-led parliamentary group in early June. SNS had also affirmed its position to continue their cooperation with SPS. After a meeting in January 2022, it was announced to the public that they would participate with a joint presidential candidate while participating on separate ballot lists for the parliamentary election. In February, Dačić was chosen as the SPS ballot representative, while Vučić was chosen as SNS ballot representative.

Parties that were a part of the UOPS coalition resumed their cooperation in mid-2021, and in October 2021, SSP announced that it would be forming a joint opposition coalition. Talks about the formation were held until 23 November, after which it was announced to the public that SSP would lead the coalition alongside DS, Narodna, PSG, and other minor parties and movements. Marinika Tepić was chosen as their parliamentary representative. It was officially formalised in February 2022, under the name of United for the Victory of Serbia (UZPS). Dveri, which was a part of the SZS coalition, declined to join their list, and instead it formed the "Patriotic Bloc" with minor right-wing parties in December 2021. DJB had also announced their participation in the election, and in late November, they began cooperating with Healthy Serbia (ZS) and the anti-vax "I live for Serbia" movement to form a "Sovereignist Bloc".

In June 2021, Nebojša Zelenović, the leader of ZZS formed a coalition named "Action" in which 28 minor environmentalist civic groups and political movements joined due to their support for the "Green Agreement for Serbia". Activist Aleksandar Jovanović Ćuta announced in mid-November that the "Ecological Uprising" movement would participate in the elections, and on 14 November, he signed an agreement with Zelenović to participate on a joint list. The Do not let Belgrade drown (NDB) movement had also agreed to join their coalition, which was formalised in January 2022, under the name We Must.

A right-wing coalition was supposed to be formed in which POKS, National Network (NM) led by Vladan Glišić, Serbian Party Oathkeepers (SSZ) and DSS would take part, although this idea was dismissed, and a coalition and party protocol were formed and signed shortly after. In January 2021, DSS and POKS signed an agreement, and in May, with 19 other movements and civic groups, they formed the National Democratic Alternative (NADA), while far-right parties NM and SSZ signed a protocol between two parties in February 2021. At the time of the general election, the POKS leadership remained disputed, although the faction around Žika Gojković legally claimed the leadership of the party.

In May 2021, SDS signed a protocol with the centrist coalition "Toleration". In November, it was announced that Democrats of Serbia, a splinter from DS which was formed in February 2021, would merge into SDS; the merge was formalised in February 2022. In late May, Nova formed a coalition with a minor movement led by Marko Bastać, but the coalition was later dissolved in September. Later during 2021, SDS formed a coalition with Nova and the Civic Democratic Forum (GDF). Tadić presented his coalition in late February 2022, which included Nova and five minor movements.

=== Slogans ===
Party/coalition	Original slogan	English translation	Refs
Dveri–POKS	Srcem za Srbiju	With a heart for Serbia	
Justice and Reconciliation Party	Muftijin amanet	Mufti's legacy	
National Democratic Alternative	Da živimo normalno	To live normally	
Party of Democratic Action of Sandžak	Sloboda–demokratija–autonomija	Freedom–democracy–autonomy	
SDS–Nova	Boris Tadić – Ajmo ljudi	Boris Tadić – Come on people	
SNS coalition	Zajedno možemo sve Dela govore Mir. Stabilnost. Vučić. Jedina granica su naši snovi	Together We Can Do Everything; Achievements speak for themselves Peace. Stability. Vučić. The only limit is our dreams	
Serbian Party Oathkeepers	Svoji na svome	On our own	
Serbian Radical Party	Pod zastavom Srbije; Šešelj za premijera	Under the Flag of Serbia; Šešelj for Prime Minister	
SPS coalition	Ivica Dačić – Premijer Srbije	Ivica Dačić – Prime Minister of Serbia	
Sovereignists	Srbija nije na prodaju Branka Stamenković – Žena iz naroda, glas naroda	Serbia is not for sale Branka Stamenković – A woman of the people, the voice of the people	
United for the Victory of Serbia	Ujedinjeni za pobedu Srbije; Promena iz korena Naš Ponoš – Predsednik	United for the Victory of Serbia; A change from the root Our Ponoš – President	
We Must	Moramo, zajedno i drugačije Moramo, snagu ulice u institucije Biljana Stojković – Moram, za zemlju, vazduh, vodu i slobodu	We must, together and differently We must, power of street into institutions Biljana Stojković – I must, for land, air, water and freedom	

=== Debates ===
2022 Serbian general election debates
Date	Time	Organizers	P Present N Non-invitee													
Date	Time	Organizers	SNS	SPS	UZPS	Moramo	NADA	DJB	Dveri	SSZ	SDS–Nova	SRS	VMSZ/SVM	SPP	Independent	Refs
11 Jan	9:05 pm	RTS	P Đorđe Dabić	P Đorđe Milićević	P Vladimir Gajić	N	N	N	N	P Milica Đurđević	N	N	N	N	N	
14 Jan	6:20 pm	Nova S	N	N	N	N	N	N	P Boško Obradović	N	N	N	N	N	P Srđan Škoro	
19 Jan	7:20 pm	Kurir TV	P Goran Vesić	N	N	N	N	N	N	N	P Boris Tadić	N	N	N	N	
21 Jan	9:00 pm	Insajder	P Vladimir Orlić	P Đorđe Milićević	N	N	P Miloš Jovanović	N	N	N	P Konstantin Samofalov	N	N	N	N	
28 Jan	9:00 pm	Euronews	N	P Ivica Dačić	N	N	N	N	N	N	P Boris Tadić	N	N	N	N	
1 Feb	9:00 pm	RTS	P Đorđe Todorović	P Nikola Nikodijević	N	P Radomir Lazović	N	N	P Radmila Vasić	N	N	N	N	N	N	
8 Feb	9:05 pm	RTS	P Vladimir Đukanović	P Snežana Paunović	N	N	N	N	N	P Dušan Proroković	P Goran Bogdanović	N	N	N	N	
18 Feb	5:05 pm	RTS	P Đorđe Dabić	P Snežana Paunović	N	N	P Miloš Jovanović	N	N	N	P Konstantin Samofalov	N	N	N	N	
19 Feb	7:20 pm	Kurir TV	N	N	N	N	P Miloš Jovanović	N	P Boško Obradović	N	N	N	N	N	N	
21 Feb	9:00 pm	Euronews	N	N	N	P Aleksandar Jovanović Ćuta	N	N	N	P Milica Đurđević	N	N	N	N	N	
22 Feb	9:05 pm	RTS	P Siniša Mali	P Dušan Bajatović	P Dušan Nikezić	N	N	N	N	N	N	P Aleksandar Šešelj	N	N	N	
24 Feb	9:00 pm	Insajder	P Đorđe Komlenski	N	P Nebojša Novaković	P Biljana Đorđević	N	N	P Andrej Mitić	N	N	N	N	N	N	
1 Mar	9:00 pm	RTS	P Vladimir Đukanović	P Snežana Paunović	P Zoran Lutovac	N	P Miloš Jovanović	P Saša Radulović	N	P Milica Đurđević	N	N	N	N	N	
2 Mar	8:15 pm	Tanjug	N	P Dušan Bajatović	N	N	N	N	N	P Milica Đurđević	N	N	N	N	P Srđan Škoro	
2 Mar	9:00 pm	RTV	P Vladimir Đukanović	N	P Stefan Jovanović	N	P Branislav Ristivojević	N	N	N	N	N	P Elvira Kovács	N	N	
3 Mar	9:00 pm	Insajder	P Dragan Šormaz	N	P Borko Stefanović	P Nebojša Zelenović	P Miloš Jovanović	N	N	N	N	N	N	N	N	
4 Mar	10:00 pm	Prva	N	N	N	N	N	N	P Boško Obradović	N	P Boris Tadić	N	N	N	P Srđan Škoro	
8 Mar	12:30 pm	RTS	P Vladimir Đukanović	N	N	N	N	N	N	N	P Goran Radosavljević	N	N	N	N	
8 Mar	9:05 pm	RTS	P Darija Kisić Tepavčević	P Slavica Đukić Dejanović	N	P Biljana Đorđević	N	P Jovana Stojković	P Boško Obradović	N	N	N	P Elvira Kovács	N	N	
9 Mar	9:00 pm	RTV	P Đorđe Todorović	P Dijana Radović	P Pavle Grbović	N	N	N	N	P Milica Đurđević	N	N	N	N	N	
10 Mar	10:40 am	RTS	N	N	N	P Radomir Lazović	N	P Vojin Biljić	N	N	N	N	N	N	N	
15 Mar	9:10 pm	RTS	P Danica Grujičić	P Vladimir Đukić	P Dragana Rakić	N	N	N	N	N	P Aris Movsesijan	P Miljko Ristić	N	P Edin Numanović	N	
17 Mar	9:00 pm	Insajder	N	P Branko Ružić	P Goran Radojev	P Đorđe Pavićević	N	N	N	N	N	N	N	N	N	
22 Mar	10:15 am	RTS	N	P Đorđe Milićević	N	N	P Miloš Jovanović	N	N	N	N	N	N	N	N	
22 Mar	9:00 pm	RTS	P Vladimir Orlić	P Dušan Bajatović	P Miroslav Aleksić	P Đorđe Miketić	N	P Milan Stamatović	P Boško Obradović	N	N	N	N	N	N	
24 Mar	12:00 pm	RTS	N	N	N	P Biljana Đorđević	N	P Vojin Biljić	N	N	N	N	N	N	N	
24 Mar	9:00 pm	RTS	P Igor Simić	P Veljko Odalović	P Slaviša Ristić	N	P Miloš Jovanović	N	N	P Milica Đurđević	N	P Aleksandar Šešelj	N	N	N	
24 Mar	9:00 pm	Insajder	N	P Đorđe Milićević	P Željko Veselinović	P Vladimir Simović	N	N	N	N	P Goran Radosavljević	N	N	N	N	
27 Mar	12:20 pm	N1	N	N	P Pavle Grbović	P Radomir Lazović	N	N	N	N	N	N	N	N	N	
28 Mar	9:00 pm	Euronews	N	N	P Miroslav Aleksić	N	N	N	N	N	P Goran Radosavljević	N	N	N	N	
29 Mar	11:00 am	RTS	N	P Snežana Paunović (Note: Initially, Ivica Dačić was supposed to appear at the debate, although he did not end up coming, and instead, Snežana Paunović appeared as his replacement.)	P Pavle Grbović	N	N	N	N	N	N	N	N	N	N	
29 Mar	9:00 pm	Euronews	N	N	N	P Biljana Đorđević	N	N	P Miloš Parandilović	N	N	N	N	N	N	
29 Mar	9:20 pm	RTS	P Vladimir Orlić	P Dušan Bajatović	P Dragan Đilas	N	N	P Saša Radulović	P Boško Obradović	N	P Boris Tadić	N	N	N	N	
30 Mar	9:00 pm	Euronews	N	P Nikola Nikodijević	N	N	P Predrag Marsenić	N	N	N	N	N	N	N	N	
31 Mar	11:30 am	RTS	P Vladimir Orlić	N	N	N	N	N	N	N	P Boris Tadić	N	N	N	N	
31 Mar	8:15 pm	N1	N	N	P Miroslav Aleksić	P Biljana Đorđević	P Predrag Marsenić	P Hana Adrović	P Miloš Parandilović	N	P Goran Radosavljević	N	N	N	N	
31 Mar	9:00 pm	RTS	P Goran Vesić	P Đorđe Milićević	P Marinika Tepić	P Nebojša Zelenović	P Miloš Jovanović	N	N	P Milica Đurđević	N	N	N	N	N	
31 Mar	10:15 pm	N1	N	N	N	P Biljana Stojković	P Miloš Jovanović	N	P Boško Obradović	P Milica Đurđević	N	N	N	N	N	

=== Issues ===
The campaign period began shortly after the dissolution of the National Assembly. Parties that took part in the environmental protests stated their opposition to Rio Tinto during the electoral campaign, while some parties, such as SRS, stated its support. Although according to CeSID, following the beginning of the Russian invasion of Ukraine on 24 February, environmental issues had almost disappeared from the public. CeSID also stated that campaign issues were also concentrated on the fight against corruption and rule of law. On the other hand, BIRODI has stated that issues around national interests, economy, and infrastructure were talked about the most. The organisation also commented that issues regarding European Union integrations had received the smallest amount of coverage.

=== Party campaigns ===
==== Serbian Progressive Party ====
SNS began campaigning shortly after the dissolution of the National Assembly on 15 February. It managed to collect around 60,000 signatures that were later submitted to RIK on 16 February, and its ballot list was confirmed a day later. Its first campaign rally was held in Merošina. After its first rally, SNS continued its campaign in other regions of Serbia. SNS announced Vučić as its presidential candidate on 6 March. After the election, the Agency for Prevention of Corruption stated that Vučić had spent about €6 million.

==== Socialist Party of Serbia ====
Dačić stated on 16 February that the party had collect more than 20,000 signatures for the parliamentary list. Its list was confirmed by RIK a day later. SPS has stated its support for Vučić as their joint presidential candidate. During the campaign, Dačić stated its opposition to NATO and he expressed support for greater cooperation with China and Russia. SPS had also described itself as a "patriotic party", and during a campaign rally Dačić stated that "SPS equals stability, continuity, and tradition". Toma Fila, who was the ballot carrier for the Belgrade City Assembly election, stated his support for pensioners' interests. The SPS-led coalition also received support from organisations such as Biogen, Environmental Movement of Beočin, and Democratic Union of Romas. In the first two weeks of the electoral campaign, SPS received US$500,000 in donations for their campaign.

==== Alliance of Vojvodina Hungarians ====
The Alliance of Vojvodina Hungarians (VMSZ/SVM) managed to collect around 9,000 signatures, while its ballot list was confirmed on 18 February. Its ballot representative Bálint Pásztor stated that the position of national minorities should be at a higher level. He announced the alliance's support for Fidesz, the ruling party of Hungary. Pásztor stated that his party was ready to cooperate with the government to finish multiple projects in Subotica. VMSZ stated its support for Vučić for the presidential election.

==== Serbian Radical Party ====
Over 11,000 signatures were collected by SRS, and their ballot list was confirmed on 18 February. Šešelj was chosen as the ballot representative; he stated his support for Vučić regarding the presidential election. During the campaign, Šešelj stated that the self-proclaimed Donetsk People's Republic and Luhansk People's Republic should be recognised by Serbia. The party also stated its opposition to military neutrality, and that instead stated Serbia should cooperate with Russia and BRICS countries. It also stated that "anti-Serbian non-governmental organizations" should be banned from being financed. SRS had also noted that state aid should be provided for domestic economy and agriculture, and that the excise tax on fuel for domestic farmers should be abolished. It had also stated its support for the reform of the Labor Law and its commitment to expanding basic healthcare.

==== United for the Victory of Serbia ====
The UZPS coalition submitted 13,000 signatures on 18 February and it nominated Zdravko Ponoš as its presidential candidate. Its campaign began on 22 February, while its last campaign rally was held on 31 March. UZPS campaigned on the formation of technocratic teams and an anti-corruption body, and it voiced support for lustration, transparency, and social justice.

==== National Democratic Alternative ====
NADA submitted 12,000 signatures on 19 February and nominated Miloš Jovanović as its presidential candidate. NADA campaigned against imposing sanctions on Russia.

==== Serbian Party Oathkeepers ====
SSZ had their parliamentary list confirmed by RIK on 20 February, with Milica Đurđević Stamenkovski as its ballot representative. SSZ also nominated Đurđević Stamenkovski as its presidential candidate in early February 2022, while RIK confirmed her candidacy on 8 March, shortly after the proclamation of the presidential electoral campaign. Representatives of the party orchestrated a protest on 4 March following the ban of Russian government-owned RT channel in Europe. Đurđević Stamenkovski had also stated that Serbia should establish closer ties with Russia.

==== Justice and Reconciliation Party ====
Logo of the Justice and Reconciliation Party's electoral campaign

The Justice and Reconciliation Party (SPP), led by Usame Zukorlić, submitted its ballot list on 19 February, while RIK confirmed the ballot a day later, with 5,056 valid signatures. On 7 March, Zukorlić stated that he would expect the cooperation between SPP and SNS to continue after the election. During the electoral campaign, the party expressed its support to have as many women as possible in management positions, as well as the affirmation of women's entrepreneurship. The party had also stated its support for reconciliation, education reforms and anti-discrimination politics. In late March, the party endorsed Vučić.

==== We Must ====
The We Must coalition submitted its signatures on 21 February. Its first campaign rally was held on 27 February, during which it announced Biljana Stojković as its presidential candidate. During the campaign period, the We Must coalition received support from German The Left, Danish Red–Green Alliance, and Slovenian The Left.

==== Sovereignists ====
The Sovereignists coalition chose Saša Radulović as the ballot representative. The coalition announced Branka Stamenković as its presidential candidate on 28 February. One of the representatives of the coalition, Milan Stamatović, stated that "Serbia should not impose sanctions on Russia", while Radulović stated that "it is unfortunate that Serbia sided with NATO" during the Russian invasion of Ukraine. During the campaign, Radulović stated the coalition's support for "souverainist policies" and its opposition to mandatory vaccination. The Sovereignists stated their support for implementing blockchain technology and free textbooks for kindergartens and primary schools. During an interview, Stamenković stated her support for the introduction of mandatory conscription into the army.

==== Dveri–POKS ====
Dveri announced its participation in the upcoming elections under the "Patriotic Bloc", which was formed in December 2021. It opposed the legalisation of civil unions, and the coalition has expressed their support towards monarchism, antiglobalism, and abolition of vaccine passports. Its leader, Boško Obradović, was chosen as their presidential candidate in January 2022. Obradović had also participated in talks regarding the formation of a united "Patriotic bloc" that would also include other right-leaning parties, although the talks had stalled shortly after. Dveri leadership announced their support for a joint "patriotic ballot list" on 13 February. Obradović announced on 16 February that Dveri reached an agreement with Gojković-led POKS faction to participate in a joint list. Soon after, Slobodan Samardžić and Duško Kuzović left the coalition. Obradović stated that his campaign would be mainly focused on the restoration of the monarchy. The coalition had received support from pulmonologist Branimir Nestorović.

Its parliamentary list was confirmed by RIK on 23 February. During the campaign, Obradović stated that one of the coalition's priorities is to enforce economic patriotism and to raise conditions for villagers and farmers. Miloš Parandilović, the ballot representative, said that the Dveri–POKS coalition is supportive of breaking up monopolies and to fight against crime and corruption. It had also stated its opposition to NATO.

==== Vojvodinians ====
The Vojvodinians coalition, which is led by the Democratic Alliance of Croats in Vojvodina (DSHV) and Together for Vojvodina, a political party with ties to the League of Social Democrats of Vojvodina (LSV), submitted its ballot on 1 March. The ballot list was confirmed by RIK a day later. LSV had also publicly stated its support for the coalition.

The coalition had primarily campaigned on "bringing Vojvodina back to the National Assembly". It had also stated its support for progressive policies and fiscal decentralisation, and its opposition to "cutting Vojvodina's forests" and "dirty technologies". Tomislav Žigmanov, the coalition representative, had also stated their support for Serbia to join the European Union and NATO. The coalition began campaigning on 10 March, and during their first rally in Subotica, the coalition had also expressed their support towards multiculturalism.

==== SDS–Nova ====
The coalition led by SDS and Nova ballot list was confirmed by RIK on 8 March. SDS announced Dragoslav Šumarac as its presidential candidate on 12 March, although Šumarac withdrew his candidature a day later after not receiving support from his coalition partners. During the campaign, the coalition stated its support for adopting a long-term strategy regarding agricultural development. It had also expressed its support towards the accession of Serbia to the European Union, although it also stated its opposition to sanction Russia.

==== Others ====
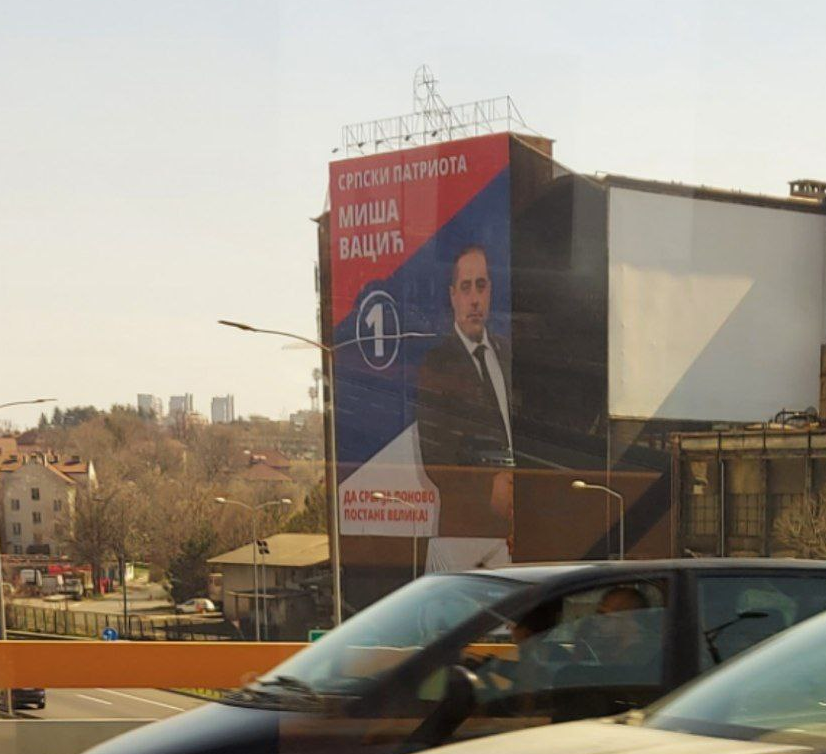
A billboard featuring Miša Vacić

The SDAS ballot list was confirmed on 2 March, with around 7,000 valid signatures. Its first campaign rally was held in Novi Pazar on 9 March. The civic group "Stolen Babies", which is led by Ana Pejić, stated their opposition to baby trafficking during an interview on 16 March. Srđan Šajn, the leader of the Roma Party, stated his support for labour rights and his opposition to "unfair privatization". Presidential candidate Miša Vacić expressed his support for introducing mandatory conscription and increasing the rights for war veterans in Serbia. The Russian Minority Alliance, which was primarily led by the neo-fascist Leviathan Movement, was initially rejected by RIK, although after the case got overturned by the Constitutional Court, RIK confirmed their ballot. CeSID claimed that the ballot list did not represent minority rights but far-right politics, while CRTA claimed that they had falsified the signatures.

== Opinion polls ==
=== Parliamentary election ===
Local regression chart of poll results from 21 June 2020 to 3 April 2022

=== Presidential election ===
Local regression chart of poll results from 10 December 2021 to 3 April 2022. This graph only includes candidates that took part in the 2022 presidential election.

== Results ==
Voting stations were opened from 07:00 (UTC+01:00) to 20:00, and there were 6,502,307 citizens in total that had the right to vote in the general elections. According to preliminary results that were published by CRTA and Ipsos/CeSID, Vučić won in the first round of the presidential elections, although SNS also lost its majority status in the National Assembly according to the parliamentary election results. In diaspora, Vučić won more votes than Ponoš. SNS managed to strengthen its presence in suburban and rural areas, although it underperformed in major cities such as Belgrade, Novi Sad, Niš, and Valjevo.

RIK announced that voting would be repeated at some stations where the results could not be determined, effectively postponing the announcement of final results. Voting was repeated five times; on 16 and 28 April, on 27 May, and on 23 and 30 June. The Albanian Coalition of Preševo Valley (KSLP) initially gained a seat following the 28 April repeat election, although following the repeat election on 27 May, it lost its seat to SPS; the coalition only needed 12 more votes to retain its seat in the National Assembly. The Administrative Court rejected the results of repeated elections that were held on 27 May, and the fourth repeated election in Veliki Trnovac was set to be held on 23 June. On the day of the election, the voting station in Veliki Trnovac did not open on time and members of the polling station committee did not agree on the division of roles. Additionally, a bomb threat was reported at the voting station, and because of it the election was postponed. RIK announced that the election would be repeated again on 30 June. In the fifth repeat election, KSLP won enough votes to retain its only seat in the National Assembly.

Many crowds formed in polling stations across Serbia, mostly due to the simultaneous holding of elections at several levels, which slowed down the process, but also because of increased voter turnout. In the end, the turnout was reported to be at around 59%, making it the largest turnout since the 2008 elections.

=== Presidential ===
Candidate	Party or alliance	Votes	%
Aleksandar Vučić	Together We Can Do Everything	2,224,914	60.01
Zdravko Ponoš	United for the Victory of Serbia	698,538	18.84
Miloš Jovanović	National Democratic Alternative	226,137	6.10
Boško Obradović	Dveri–POKS	165,181	4.46
Milica Đurđević Stamenkovski	Serbian Party Oathkeepers	160,553	4.33
Biljana Stojković	We Must	122,378	3.30
Branka Stamenković	Sovereignists	77,031	2.08
Miša Vacić	Serbian Right	32,947	0.89
Total		3,707,679	100.00
Valid votes		3,707,679	97.63
Invalid/blank votes		89,933	2.37
Total votes		3,797,612	100.00
Registered voters/turnout		6,502,307	58.62
Source: Republic Bureau of Statistics

=== Parliamentary ===
Electoral list	Votes	%	+/–	Seats	+/–
Together We Can Do Everything	1,635,101	44.27	–16.38	120	–68
United for the Victory of Serbia	520,469	14.09	New	38	New
SPS–JS–Zeleni	435,274	11.79	+1.41	31	–1
National Democratic Alternative	204,444	5.54	+3.30	15	+15
We Must	178,733	4.84	New	13	New
Dveri–POKS	144,762	3.92	New	10	New
Serbian Party Oathkeepers	141,227	3.82	+2.39	10	+10
Sovereignists	86,362	2.34	+0.04	0	0
Serbian Radical Party	82,066	2.22	+0.17	0	0
SDS–Nova	63,560	1.72	New	0	New
Alliance of Vojvodina Hungarians	60,313	1.63	–0.60	5	–4
Justice and Reconciliation Party	35,850	0.97	–0.03	3	–1
Stolen Babies	31,196	0.84	New	0	New
DSHV–ZZV	24,024	0.65	–0.30	2	+2
Party of Democratic Action of Sandžak	20,553	0.56	–0.21	2	–1
Albanian Coalition of Preševo Valley	10,165	0.28	–0.45	1	–2
Russian Minority Alliance	9,569	0.26	–0.44	0	0
Roma Party	6,393	0.17	New	0	New
Alternative for Changes	3,267	0.09	New	0	New
Total	3,693,328	100.00	–	250	0
Valid votes	3,693,328	97.04			
Invalid/blank votes	112,722	2.96			
Total votes	3,806,050	100.00			
Registered voters/turnout	6,502,307	58.53			
Source: Republic Bureau of Statistics

== Aftermath ==
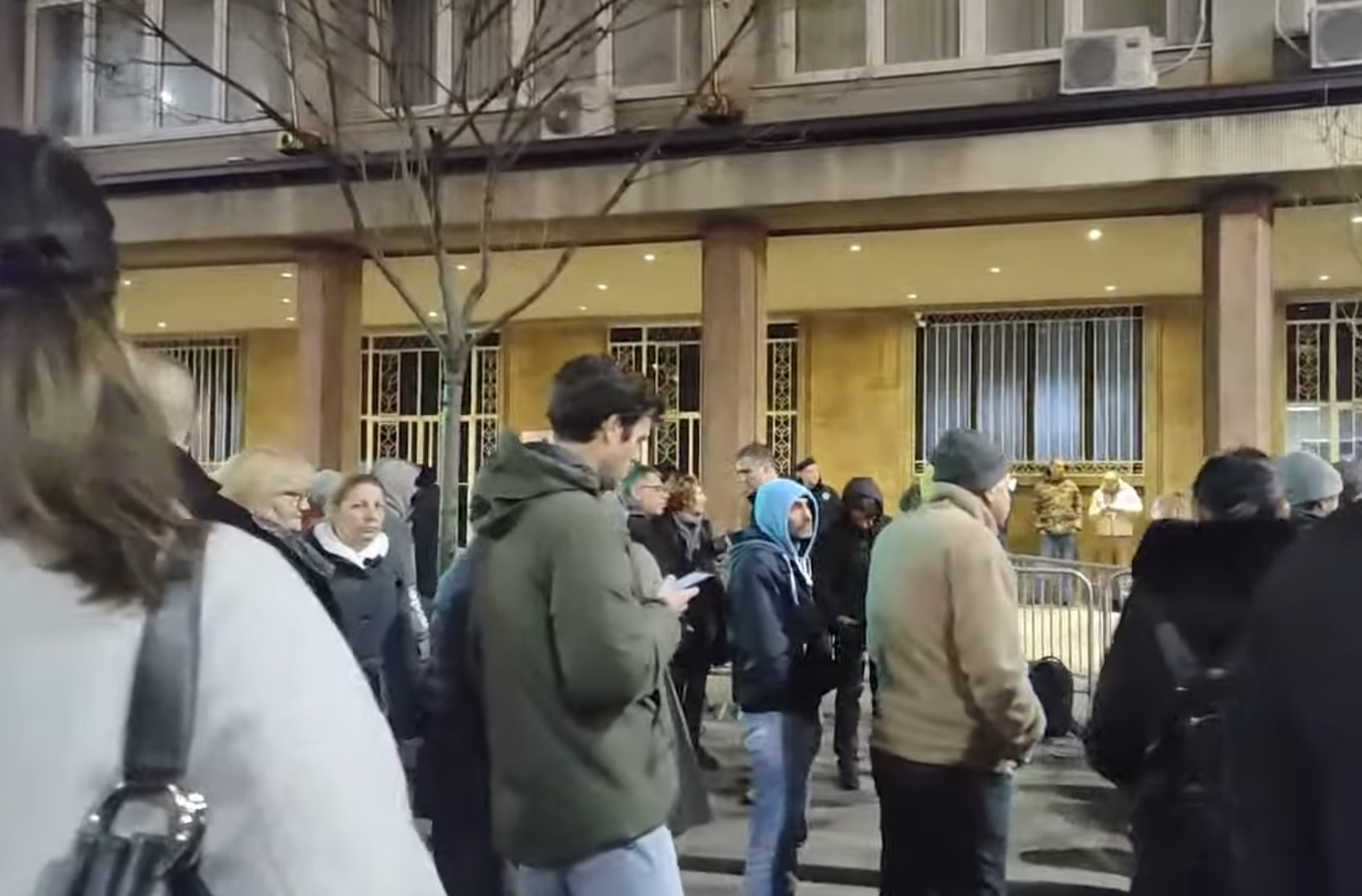
A protest in front of the building of RIK a day after the elections

CeSID reported that electoral irregularities occurred in the early hours of the election. Later that evening, CRTA stated that multiple Bulgarian trains occurred during the vote, and that some ballot stations in Belgrade declined to cooperate with electoral observers. OSE, a non-governmental organisation, stated that irregularities took place in Novi Sad. CRTA and political activists had also noted that the election day was marked by high tensions, verbal and in several places, such as Belgrade, physical violence. Dveri and SSP also reported irregularities in Niš. ENEMO had stated that intimidation and vote buying affected the results of the elections, and that the process of voter registration lacked transparency. Former SNS MP Bratislav Jugović and the leader of PSG, Pavle Grbović, were physically attacked outside of voting stations.

The PACE monitoring mission evaluated that the "fundamental freedoms were largely respected, and voters were presented diverse political options, but a number of shortcomings resulted in an uneven playing field, favouring the incumbents". PACE also noted that public sector employees were pressured to support the ruling party and that state resources were misused during the campaign period. Kyriakos Hadjiyianni, the special coordinator and leader of the OSCE short-term observers, said that the campaign period was competitive though that the ruling party had undue advantage. According to Freedom House, after the 2022 elections, Serbia ceased to be an electoral democracy.

Shortly after 23:00 (UTC+01:00), Vučić declared his victory. He announced in a televised victory speech, that he secured roughly 60% of the popular vote, adding, "I am pleased that a huge number of people voted and showed the democratic nature of Serbian society". After the proclamation of the preliminary results, Vučić was congratulated by Emmanuel Macron, Vladimir Putin, Miloš Zeman, Zoran Milanović, and others. Milorad Dodik also congratulated him, after stating his support for him a few days prior to the election. The Ecological Uprising and Assembly of Free Serbia, who were a part of the We Must coalition, organised a protest in front of the RIK building on 4 April. After the election, Ponoš left Narodna. Further disagreements between the coalition partners in the UZPS coalition broke out, with Vuk Jeremić and his Narodna opposing the meeting between Dragan Đilas and Vučić. Tepić also accused Jeremić of populism. This led to the dissolution of UZPS. In June 2022, Ćuta, Stojković, and Zelenović held a founding assembly of their political party, which was named Together.

=== Government formation ===
Vučić was sworn in again as president on 31 May; during his speech he had stated that the government would be formed by the end of July and that the government would potentially impose sanctions on Russia due to the 2022 Russian invasion of Ukraine. SPS confirmed that it would want to extend its cooperation with SNS, while the Democratic Alliance of Croats in Vojvodina (DSHV) and Alliance of Vojvodina Hungarians (VMSZ) also expressed their desire to join the government. Vučić announced that consultations with all parliamentary lists would begin on 14 July. The consultations lasted until 18 July. The first constitutive session of the 2022–2026 convocation was held on 1 August. Brnabić received the mandate to form a new government on 27 August. The composition of her cabinet was presented on 23 October, while the cabinet was sworn in on 26 October.
