= Opinion polling for the 2022 Serbian general election =

In the run-up to the 2022 Serbian general election, various organisations carried out opinion polling to gauge voting intentions in Serbia. Results of such poll are displayed in this list. The date range for these opinion polls are from the previous presidential election, held on 2 April 2017, and the previous parliamentary election, held on 21 June 2020, to 3 April 2022.

== Graphical summary ==
=== Parliamentary election ===
Local regression chart of poll results from 21 June 2020 to 3 April 2022

=== Presidential election ===
Local regression chart of poll results from 10 December 2021 to 3 April 2022. This graph only includes candidates that took part in the 2022 presidential election

== Poll results ==
=== Parliamentary election ===
==== 2022 ====
Polling firm	Date of publishment	Sample size	SNS–led coalition	SPAS	SPS–JS	UZPS	Moramo	NADA	Sovereignists		Dveri	SSZ	SRS	SDS–Nova	Others	Lead
Polling firm	Date of publishment	Sample size	SNS–led coalition	SPAS	SPS–JS	UZPS	Moramo	NADA	DJB	ZS	Dveri	SSZ	SRS	SDS–Nova	Others	Lead
2022 election	3 April	–	44.3		11.8	14.0	4.8	5.5	2.3		3.9 (Note: Dveri took part with POKS in the 2022 parliamentary election)	3.8	2.2	1.7	5.7	30.3
Ipsos	31 March	1,100	51.4		8.5	13.8	4.5	4.2	2.6		2.4	3.4	1.7	1.2	6.3 (Note: VMSZ/SVM: 1.2%, SPP: 0.7%, ZZV–DSHV: 0.6%, SDA S: 0.3%, OBAP: 0.3%, RP: 0.2%, RMS: 0.2%, APN/AZP: 0.1%, KSLP: 0.1%)	37.6
Faktor Plus	29 March	1,100	53.6		10.2	13.7	4.7	3.8	3.1		2.2	3.7	2.0	2.3	0.7	39.9
NSPM	29 March	1,150	51.7		8.9	17.0	7.3	2.4	1.9		2.0	2.4	1.8	2.2	2.4	34.7
ŠSM	28 March	2,400	44.7		5.7	20.1	5.8	3.3	3.1		2.8	3.0	1.2	2.7	7.6 (Note: VMSZ/SVM: 1.8%, SPP: 1.0%, ZZV–DSHV: 0.9%, OBAP: 0.8%, SDA S: 0.6%, APN/AZP: 0.6%, KSLP: 0.1%, RP: 0.1%, Blank ballots: 1.6%)	24.6
Nova S	14 March	1,003	53.6		6.9	13.2	8.1	3.4	1.7		2.6	3.2	1.3	3.1	2.9 (Note: Excluded 8.8% of the voters that were undecided and 6.1% that refused to answer)	40.4
Faktor Plus	7 March	1,100	53.4		10.1	14.0	5.0	3.9	3.0		2.1	3.6	1.8	1.5	1.6	39.4
NSPM	17 February	1,000	41.4		7.4	16.6	12.1	2.0	2.4		2.1	3.4	2.1	2.3	8.2	24.8
Sprint insight	9 February	1,179	55.0			13.5	7.5	2.0	2.0	–	5.0		2.0	–	13.0	41.5
NSPM	4 February	–	43.4		9.2	14.8	13.1	3.2	3.7			2.7	2.5	1.7	5.7	28.6
Faktor Plus	30 January	1,100	55.6		10.2	13.3	7.5	4.0	3.0		1.7	3.6	1.1	–	0.0	42.3

==== 2021 ====
Polling firm	Date of publishment	Sample size	SNS–led coalition	SPAS	SPS–JS	UZPS				Moramo			NADA		DJB	ZS	Dveri	SSZ	SRS	SDS–Nova	Others	Lead
Polling firm	Date of publishment	Sample size	SNS–led coalition	SPAS	SPS–JS	SSP	Narodna	DS	PSG	NDB	ZZS	EU	DSS	POKS	DJB	ZS	Dveri	SSZ	SRS	SDS–Nova	Others	Lead
Faktor Plus	20 December	1,200	57.0		10.3	12.0				7.0			4.3		2.4	1.2	1.4	3.0	1.4	–	0.0	45.0
ŠSM	10 December	1,525	49.9		7.7	17.9				8.8			2.2		2.5	1.0	1.2	2.8	0.6	0.8	4.6 (Note: Levijatan: 0.9%, VMSZ/SVM: 0.9%, #1od5m: 0.8%, SPP: 0.5%, PVD/PDD: 0.4%, SDA S: 0.4%, LDP: 0.1%, LSV: 0.1%, Blank ballots: 1.9%)	32.0
Demostat	2 December	–	55.0			16.0				9.0			–	–	–	–	5.0		–	–	15.0	39.0
Faktor Plus	31 October	–	58.3		10.4	5.4	2.7	1.9	1.5	3.0			4.3		3.4	–	1.5	2.9	1.4	–	3.3 (Note: S90/ZS: 1.8%, Other: 1.5%)	47.9
Faktor Plus	29 September	–	58.0		10.3	5.1	2.7	1.4	1.3	2.0			4.3		3.6	1.2	1.7	–	1.2	–	7.2 (Note: S90/ZS: 1.4%, Other: 2.9%)	47.7
Faktor Plus	3 August	–	58.2		9.0	4.5	2.5	1.2	1.4	2.7			4.0		3.8	–	2.0	2.0	1.5	–	7.2 (Note: Minority parties: 4%)	49.2
ŠSM	31 July	1,067	53.8		7.0	6.4	4.9	1.9	1.2	9.4			3.9		2.9	–	1.6	1.4	1.4	–	4.2	44.4
Ipsos	27 June	–	61.2		8.9	4.2	1.2	1.2	0.5	1.4	0.3	–	1.9	3.2	3.0	0.8	1.9	1.9	1.6	1.0	7.6 (Note: VMSZ/SVM: 1.5%, Levijatan: 1.1%, SPP: 0.8%, SDA S: 0.6%, LSV: 0.5%, LDP: 0.4%, Black on White: 0.1%, Other: 0.9%)	52.3
Faktor Plus	10 May	1,200	60.0	3.4	8.1	3.3	–	–	–	–	–	–	3.9		3.9	–	–	–	–	–	17.4 (Note: Minority parties: 4%)	51.9
Ipsos	5 April	1,000	58.0	3.6	7.2	3.8	–	–	–	–	–	–	–	–	4.4	–	–	–	–	–	20.6	50.8
Faktor Plus	18 February	–	60.3	4.2	8.3	3.2	2.4	–	1.5	–	–	–	3.7		3.8	–	1.5	2.2	1.4	–	7.5	52.0
Ipsos	1 January	–	61.9	3.6	9.0	1.6	0.3	1.1	0.8	–	–	–	2.3	2.0	3.7	0.8	1.1	1.4	2.6	0.9	8.6 (Note: VSMZ/SVM: 1.6%, SPP: 1.1%, Levijatan: 0.7%, LSV: 0.7%, SDA S: 0.4%, Other: 2.3%)	52.9

==== 2020 ====
Polling firm	Date of publishment	Sample size	SNS–led coalition	SPAS	SPS–JS	SSP	Narodna	DS	PSG	DSS	POKS	DJB	Dveri	SSZ	SRS	Others	Lead
Sprint insight	19 December	–	46.8	6.4	11.5	2.2	1.1	0.4	2.1	2.9	3.7	5.3	2.3	–	3.6	11.7 (Note: NDB: 1.3%)	35.3
Faktor Plus	4 September	–	59.1	5.1	9.0	3.1	2.3	–	–	–	–	–	2.0	–	–	19.4	50.1
2020 election	21 June	–	63.0	3.9	10.8	–	–	–	1.6	2.3	2.7	2.4	–	1.5	2.1	9.7	42.2

=== Presidential election ===
==== 2022 ====
Polling firm	Date of publishment	Sample size	Aleksandar Vučić	Zdravko Ponoš	Biljana Stojković	Miloš Jovanović	Branka Stamenković	Boško Obradović	Milica Đurđević	Miša Vacić	Others	Lead
2022 election	3 April	–	60.0	18.8	3.3	6.1	2.0	4.5	4.3	0.9	0.1	41.2
Ipsos	31 March	2,400	60.1	16.4	5.0	5.5	2.2	2.8	4.9	0.3	2.8	43.7
ŠSM	28 March	2,400	55.1	27.0	3.1	4.4	2.2	3.0	3.0	0.2	2.0	28.1
Sprint insight	9 February	1,179	45.7	10.8	–	5.3	–	8.5	16.1	–	13.6	29.6

==== 2021 ====
Polling firm	Date of publishment	Sample size	Aleksandar Vučić	Zdravko Ponoš	Miloš Jovanović	Boško Obradović	Milica Đurđević	Others	Lead
ŠSM	10 December	1,525	46.9	11.6	5.6	4.0	2.1	29.8	35.3

==== 2017 ====
Polling firm	Date of publishment	Sample size	Aleksandar Vučić	Saša Janković	Vuk Jeremić	Luka Maksimović	Vojislav Šešelj	Boško Obradović	Others	Lead
Faktor Plus	2 June	–	60.1	16.2	6.3	4.8	3.9	–	8.8	43.9
2017 election	2 April	–	56.0	16.6	5.7	9.6	4.6	2.3	5.1	39.4
