= Đorđe Dabić =

Serbian politician (born 1991)

- Ђорђе Дабић

Member of the National Assembly of the Republic of Serbia
- In office 3 August 2020 – 1 August 2022

Personal details
- Born: 1991 (age 34–35)
- Party: SNS

Đorđe Dabić (Serbian Cyrillic: Ђорђе Дабић; born 1991) is a Serbian politician. He was a member of Serbia's national assembly from 2020 to 2022 and is now a state secretary in the ministry of public administration and local self-government. Dabić is a member of the Serbian Progressive Party (SNS).

== Private career ==
Dabić was born in the town of Zlatibor in the municipality of Čajetina, Republic of Serbia, in what was then the Socialist Federal Republic of Yugoslavia. He holds a Bachelor of Laws degree from the University of Belgrade.

== Politician ==
Dabić participated in the Progressive Party's Academy of Young Leaders program and has served as commissioner of the party's municipal board in Čajetina.

=== Municipal politics ===
Dabić was given the fourth position on the Progressive Party's electoral list for the Čajetina municipal assembly in the 2016 Serbian local elections and was elected when the list won seven mandates. Čajetina was one of the relatively few municipalities where the SNS was not victorious in the 2016 cycle; the Serbian People's Party (SNP) alliance led by longtime mayor Milan Stamatović won the election, and Dabić served as a member of the opposition.

Dabić was promoted to the third position on the SNS list for the 2020 local elections and was re-elected when the list won eight mandates. Stamatović, who was by this time the leader of the Healthy Serbia (ZS) party, again led his local alliance to victory, and the SNS remained in opposition.

Although Healthy Serbia joined the Progressive Party's alliance at the republic level in 2023, the parties fielded separate lists in Čajetina for the 2024 Serbian local elections. Dabić appeared in the fourth position on the SNS list and was re-elected when it won exactly four mandates, finishing third against Stamatović's alliance.

=== Parliamentarian ===
For the 2020 Serbian parliamentary election, the Serbian Progressive Party reserved many of the lead positions on its For Our Children electoral list for young party activists. Dabić received the seventh position on the list; this was tantamount to election, and he was indeed elected when the list won a landslide majority with 188 out of 250 mandates. During his assembly term, he was a member of the judiciary committee, (Note: Formally known as the Committee on the Judiciary, Public Administration, and Local Self-Government.) a deputy member of the committee on Kosovo-Metohija and the committee on the diaspora and Serbs in the region, a deputy member of the European Union–Serbia committee on stabilization and association, the leader of Serbia's parliamentary friendship group with Zimbabwe, and a member of thirty-nine other parliamentary friendship groups. (Note: He was a member of the friendship groups with the Bahamas, Bosnia and Herzegovina, Botswana, Cameroon, the Central African Republic, Comoros, the Dominican Republic, Ecuador, Equatorial Guinea, Eritrea, Grenada, Guinea-Bissau, Jamaica, Kyrgyzstan, Laos, Liberia, Madagascar, Mali, Mauritius, Montenegro, Mozambique, Nauru, Nicaragua, Nigeria, Palau, Papua New Guinea, Paraguay, the Republic of Congo, Saint Vincent and the Grenadines, Sao Tome and Principe, the Solomon Islands, South Sudan, Sri Lanka, Sudan, Suriname, Togo, Trinidad and Tobago, Uruguay, and Uzbekistan.)

He was given the 151st position on the SNS's Together We Can Do Everything list in the 2022 Serbian parliamentary election and was not re-elected when the list won a plurality victory with 120 seats. In the 2023 parliamentary election, he received the 199th position on the successor Serbia Must Not Stop list; this was too low a position for election to be a realistic prospect, and he was not elected when the list won 129 seats.

=== Secretary of State ===
In November 2022, Dabić was appointed as a secretary of state in the ministry of public administration and local self-government. In 2023, he made accusations about a leader of that year's student anti-government protests and about the student leader's family; afterward, protesters targeted his ministry and demanded that he apologize.

He was appointed to a second term as a secretary of state in May 2024.
