= Đorđe Todorović =

Serbian politician

- Ђорђе Тодоровић

Member of the National Assembly of the Republic of Serbia
- In office 21 October 2022 – 6 February 2024
- In office 3 August 2020 – 1 August 2022

Personal details
- Born: 1991 (age 34–35) Belgrade, Serbia, SFR Yugoslavia
- Party: SNS

Đorđe Todorović (Serbian Cyrillic: Ђорђе Тодоровић; born 1991) is a Serbian politician. He served in the Serbian national assembly on an almost continuous basis from 2020 to 2024 as a member of the Serbian Progressive Party (SNS).

== Private career ==
Todorović was born in Belgrade, Serbia, in what was then the Socialist Federal Republic of Yugoslavia. He is from the Belgrade municipality of Palilula and is an engineer of organizational sciences.

== Politician ==
=== Municipal politics ===
Todorović appeared in the nineteenth position on the Progressive Party's electoral list for the Palilula municipal assembly in the 2016 Serbian local elections and was elected when the list won a plurality victory with twenty-seven out of fifty-five seats. He did not seek re-election in 2020. He was described in a February 2020 article as a student in the SNS Academy of Young Leaders program.

=== Parliamentarian ===
Todorović was given the sixth position on the SNS-led For Our Children list in the 2020 Serbian parliamentary election. This was tantamount to election, and he was indeed elected when the list won a landslide majority with 188 out of 250 mandates. In his first term, he was a member of the foreign affairs committee and the committee on constitutional and legislative issues, a deputy member of the defence and internal affairs committee and the committee on Kosovo–Metohija, a member of Serbia's delegation to the parliamentary assembly of the Collective Security Treaty Organization, the leader of Serbia's parliamentary friendship group with Lebanon, and a member of sixty other parliamentary friendship groups. (Note: In the 2020–22 parliament, he was a member of the friendship groups with Argentina, Armenia, the Bahamas, Belarus, Bosnia and Herzegovina, Botswana, Brazil, Cameroon, the Central African Republic, China, Comoros, Cuba, the Dominican Republic, Ecuador, Equatorial Guinea, Eritrea, Grenada, Guinea-Bissau, Hungary, Iceland, India, Iran, Israel, Jamaica, Japan, Kazakhstan, Kyrgyzstan, Laos, Liberia, Madagascar, Mali, Mauritius, Mozambique, Nauru, Nicaragua, Nigeria, North Macedonia, Norway, Palau, Papua New Guinea, Paraguay, the Republic of Congo, Russia, Saint Vincent and the Grenadines, Sao Tome and Principe, the Solomon Islands, South Sudan, Sri Lanka, Sudan, Suriname, Syria, Togo, Trinidad and Tobago, Turkmenistan, the United Arab Emirates, the United Kingdom, the United States of America, Uruguay, Uzbekistan, and Venezuela.)

Todorović criticized the media outlets N1 and Nova S in a December 2020 debate, charging them with being "anti-state" and saying that they were "slowly becoming political parties."

He was given the 126th position on the SNS's Together We Can Do Everything list in the 2022 Serbian parliamentary election and was not immediately re-elected when the list won a plurality victory with 120 seats. He received a mandate in October 2022 as the replacement for another party member.

In the 2022–24 parliament, Todorović was member of the spatial planning committee, (Note: Formally known as the Committee on Spatial Planning, Transport, Infrastructure, and Telecommunications.) a deputy member of the judiciary committee (Note: Formally known as the Committee on the Judiciary, Public Administration, and Local Self-Government.) and the committee on Kosovo-Metohija, the head of Serbia's parliamentary friendship groups with Lebanon and Lithuania, and a member of 118 other parliamentary friendship groups. (Note: In the 2022–24 parliament, he was a member of the friendship groups with Argentina, Armenia, Austria, the Bahamas, Bangladesh, Belarus, Belgium, Bhutan, Bosnia and Herzegovina, Botswana, Brazil, Bulgaria, Burundi, Cabo Verde, Cambodia, Cameroon, the Caribbean countries (Antigua and Barbuda, Barbados, Belize, Dominica, Haiti, Saint Kitts and Nevis, Saint Lucia), Chile, China, Colombia, Comoros, Costa Rica, Croatia, Cuba, Cyprus, the Czech Republic, the Democratic Republic of the Congo, Denmark, Djibouti, the Dominican Republic, Ecuador, El Salvador, Equatorial Guinea, Eritrea, Eswatini, Ethiopia, France, Gabon, The Gambia, Georgia, Germany, Grenada, Guatemala, Guinea-Bissau, Guyana, Honduras, Iceland, Indonesia, Ireland, Israel, Italy, Jamaica, Japan, Jordan, Kuwait, Kyrgyzstan, Laos, Latvia, Lesotho, Libya, Liechtenstein, Luxembourg, Madagascar, Malaysia, the Maldives, Mali, Malta, Mauritius, Micronesia, Mongolia, Morocco, Mozambique, Myanmar, Namibia, the Netherlands, New Zealand and the Pacific Ocean countries (Fiji, Nauru, Palau, Papua New Guinea, the Solomon Islands, Tuvalu, Vanuatu), Nicaragua, Oman, Pakistan, Palestine, Panama, Paraguay, Peru, Portugal, Qatar, the Republic of Congo, Russia, Rwanda, Sao Tome and Principe, Saudi Arabia, Saint Vincent and the Grenadines, Senegal, Sierra Leone, Slovakia, Slovenia, South Sudan, the countries of Southeast Asia (Brunei Darussalam, Singapore, Thailand, Timor-Leste), Spain, Sri Lanka, the countries of Sub-Saharan Africa, Sudan, Suriname, Sweden, Switzerland, Syria, Tajikistan, Togo, Trinidad and Tobago, Turkmenistan, Uganda, Ukraine, the United Kingdom, the United States of America, Uruguay, Uzbekistan, Vietnam, Zambia, and Zimbabwe.) He was a vocal supporter of Aleksandar Vučić's policies toward Kosovo, saying that the Serbian president was working to prevent international recognition of Kosovo as an independent state and to defend the disputed territory's Serb population. Todorović described opposition figure Vuk Jeremić as a "false altruist" interested only in building his reputation among the western powers.

He was not a candidate in the 2023 Serbian parliamentary election, and his term ended when the new assembly convened in February 2024.
