= Vladimir Vuletić =

Serbian lawyer and academic (1978–2026)

Dr. iur. Vladimir Vuletić
- Владимир Вулетић
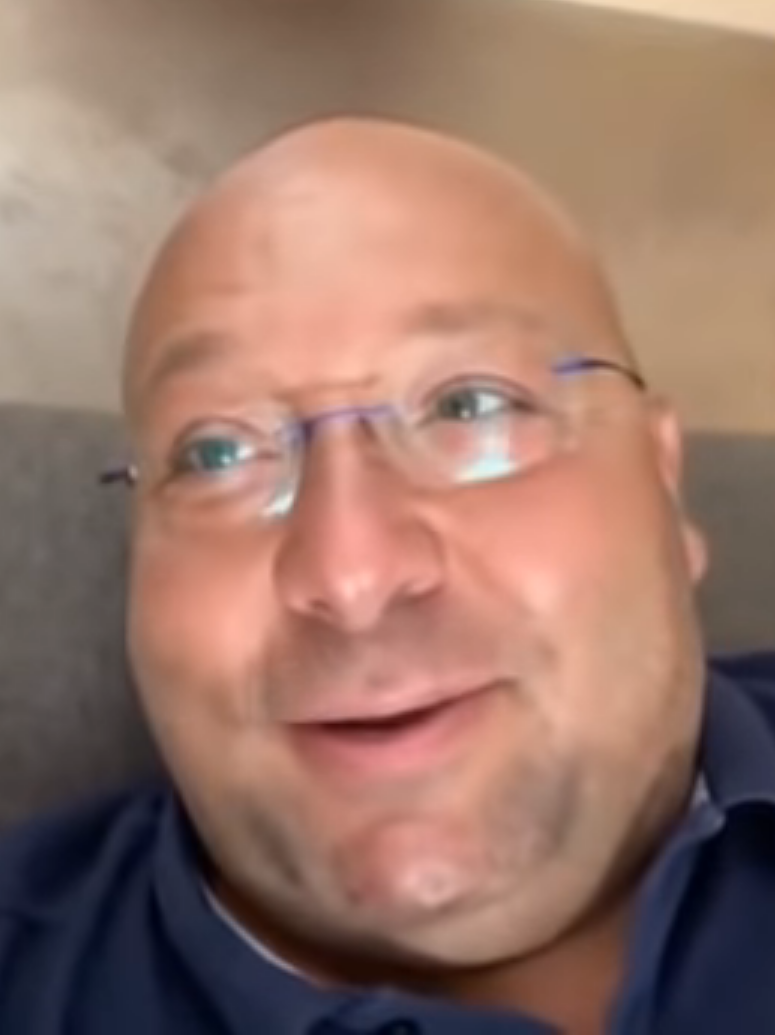
- Vuletić in 2021
- Born: 28 November 1978; Šabac, SR Serbia, SFR Yugoslavia
- Died: c. 11 October 2026 (aged 47); Belgrade, Serbia
- Education: University of Belgrade
- Occupations: Lawyer, academic, sports administrator

Vladimir Vuletić (Serbian Cyrillic: Владимир Вулетић; 28 November 1978 – c. 11 October 2026) was a Serbian lawyer and academic, who was an associate professor at the Faculty of Law, University of Belgrade and a vice president of FK Partizan.

== Early life and education ==
Vuletić was born on 28 November 1978 in Šabac, at that time part of SR Serbia and SFR Yugoslavia. There he finished the elementary school "Janko Veselinović" and then the Šabac Gymnasium.

He enrolled at the Faculty of Law, University of Belgrade in 1997. He graduated in June 2001 as a student of the generation. He was a scholarship holder of the Government of the Republic of Serbia and the Embassy of the Kingdom of Norway in Belgrade.

Vuletić attended postgraduate studies at the Faculty of Law, University of Belgrade. He defended his master's thesis "Seller's Liability for Physical Defects in Classical Roman Law" in November 2006, and his doctoral thesis "Protection of the Buyer's Rights - the Contribution of Roman Classical Law to the Development of European Private Law" in June 2010.

== Academic career ==
Vuletić was elected an assistant-trainee at the Faculty of Law of the University of Belgrade in the field of Roman law in March 2003. He became an assistant in June 2007.

He was elected assistant professor in March 2011. He was the Secretary of the Department of Legal History from 2003 to 2008.

Vuletić was later an associate professor at the Faculty of Law, University of Belgrade.

== FK Partizan ==
At the annual assembly of FK Partizan, in December 2014, he was elected president of the club's Supervisory Board.

Vuletic served as the vice president of FK Partizan until his resignation on 9 February 2021 after the arrest of the members of the FK Partizan supporters group Grobari, and the discovery of hidden bunkers on the Partizan Stadium which were used for criminal activities.

== Political career ==
On 24 May 2021, Vuletić said that he would run for President of Serbia at the 2022 Serbian general election. On 1 June 2021, Vuletić founded a new political organization called Black on White, which, as he said, will fight for a "legal and just state" and against the SNS-led government.

== Acting career ==
In two episodes of the first season of the series Balkan Shadows by Dragan Bjelogrlić, which was broadcast at the end of 2017 on RTS1, Vuletić appeared in the role of a member of the Thule Society.

== Death ==
On 12 October 2026, Vuletić was found dead in the sauna of his Belgrade apartment, when four of his academic associates arrived at the residence, concerned after he had been unreachable for three days. On the same day Higher Public Prosecution Office in Belgrade opened a case to determine the exact cause of death.
