= Konstantin Samofalov =

Serbian politician

- Константин Самофалов
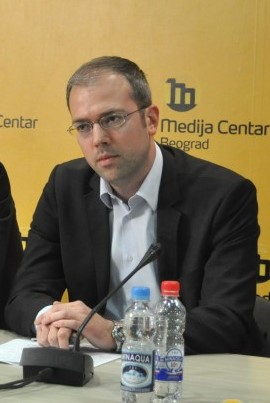
- Samofalov in 2015

Member of the National Assembly of the Republic of Serbia
- In office 14 February 2007 – 16 April 2014

Member of the City Assembly of Belgrade
- In office 25 November 2004 – 14 July 2008

Personal details
- Born: 15 June 1982 (age 44) Belgrade, SR Serbia, SFR Yugoslavia
- Party: DS (2000–2014); SDS (2014–2023); SSP (2023–present)
- Education: University of Belgrade; University of Defence
- Occupation: Politician

Konstantin Samofalov (Serbian Cyrillic: Константин Самофалов; born 15 June 1982) is a Serbian politician. He was a Democratic Party (DS) member of the Serbian parliament from 2007 to 2014 and also served in the Belgrade city assembly from 2004 to 2008. He affiliated with the breakaway Social Democratic Party (SDS) in 2014 and remained with that party until 2023, when he joined the Party of Freedom and Justice (SSP).

== Early life and private career ==
Samofalov was born in Belgrade, in what was then the Socialist Republic of Serbia in the Socialist Federal Republic of Yugoslavia. His great-grandfather was a Don Cossack military officer in the Imperial Russian Army in World War I who later fought for Pyotr Wrangel's White Army in the Russian Civil War; he left Russia for the last time in 1920 and arrived in Belgrade in 1923. Samofalov participated in protests against Slobodan Milošević's government in 1999 and in a 2017 article for Danas recounted how he had been physically attacked by regime supporters at some events. He received a bachelor's degree from the University of Belgrade Faculty of Law in 2007 and graduated in advanced defence and security studies from the Military Academy of Serbia's University of Defence in 2012. He was written about his own and his family's experience in the Serbian Armed Forces.

He is a Senior Network Member at the European Leadership Network (ELN).

== Political career ==
=== Democratic Party (2000–14) ===
Samofalov joined the Democratic Party (DS) in 2000 and served as president of its youth branch. In the 2004 Serbian local elections, he appeared on the party's electoral lists for both the Belgrade city assembly and the Vračar municipal assembly. The DS won both elections; Samofalov was given a city assembly mandate and served for the next four years.

In January 2005, Samofalov took part in a media prank with other members of the DS's youth wing, leaving alarm clocks, car radios, and cellphones on the doorstep of Serbian prime minister Vojislav Koštunica, calling on him to "wake up, hear the news, and communicate with the nation." (This was in reference to the prime minister's perceived aloofness.) They also attempted to award Koštunica with a diploma for "extraordinary efforts to lead Serbia back into the darkness" for his refusal to extradite war crimes suspects to the International Criminal Tribunal for the Former Yugoslavia (ICTY).

Samofalov received the 204th position out of 250 on the DS's electoral list in the 2007 Serbian parliamentary election. The list won sixty-four mandates and afterward formed an unstable coalition government with G17 Plus and Koštunica's Democratic Party of Serbia (DSS). Samofalov was included in his party's assembly delegation and served as a government supporter. (From 2000 to 2011, parliamentary mandates were awarded to sponsoring parties or coalitions rather than to individual candidates, and it was common practice for the mandates to be assigned out of numerical order. Samofalov's low position on the list – which was in any event mostly alphabetical – had no specific bearing on his chances of election.) In his first parliamentary term, he was a member of the legislative committee and the committee on defence and security.

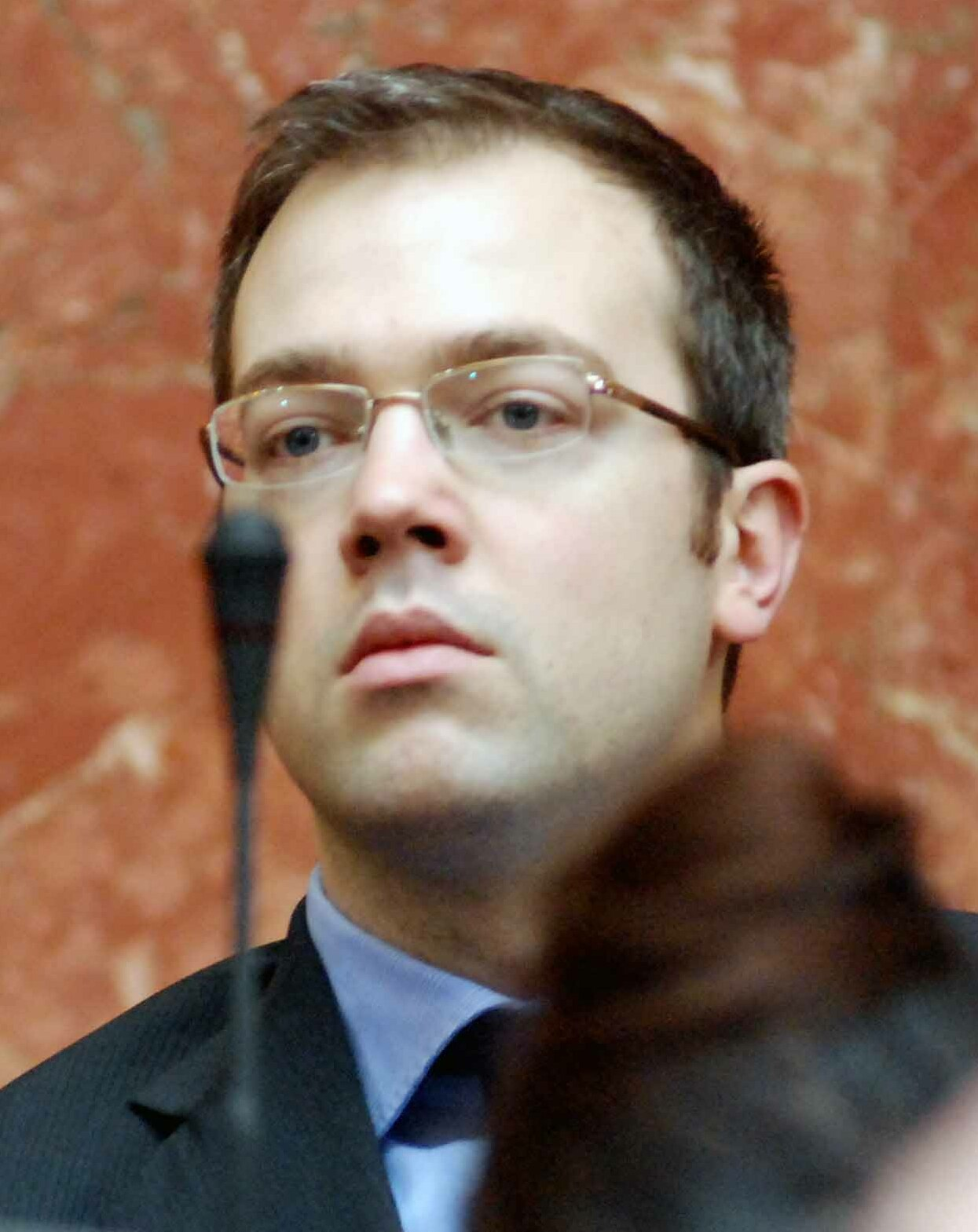
Samofalov as a member of the National Assembly in 2009

The DS–DSS alliance broke down in early 2008, and a new election was held in May of that year. Samofalov received the 190th position on the DS's For a European Serbia (ZES) coalition list – which was, again, mostly alphabetical – and was given a mandate for a second term after the list won 102 seats. The election did not produce a clear winner; after protracted negotiations, the ZES alliance formed a new coalition government with the Socialist Party of Serbia (SPS), and Samofalov continued to serve as a government supporter. He did not seek re-election to the Belgrade city assembly in the 2008 local elections, which were held concurrently with the parliamentary vote, but was included in the ZES list for the Vračar municipal assembly and received a mandate for that body after the list won a majority victory.

Samofalov continued to serve on the legislative committee and the defence and security committee in his second parliamentary term. He was also a deputy member of the administrative committee and the committee on justice and administration, a deputy member of Serbia's delegation to the North Atlantic Treaty Organization Parliamentary Assembly (NATO PA), where Serbia has observer status, and a member of Serbia's parliamentary friendship groups with Germany, the Sovereign Order of Malta, and the United States of America. He led Serbia's delegation to the NATO assembly for a 2010 meeting in Riga and a 2012 meeting in Tallinn. In June 2010, he defended Serbia's policy of military neutrality and said that the country's ZES-led administration would not actually seek to join NATO. In the same year, he responded to NATO's announcement of a troop reduction in Kosovo and Metohija by saying, "negotiations with Albanians should start as soon as possible so that the historical conflict between Serbs and Albanians comes to an end."

Serbia's electoral system was reformed in 2011, such that all parliamentary mandates were awarded to candidates on successful lists in numerical order. Samofalov received the sixty-first position on the DS's Choice for a Better Life list in the 2012 parliamentary election and was re-elected when the list won sixty-seven mandates. The Serbian Progressive Party (SNS) won the greatest number of seats and afterward formed a new administration with the SPS and other parties, while the DS moved into opposition. In his third parliamentary term, Samofalov was a member of the defence and security committee, a deputy member of the foreign affairs committee and the committee on Kosovo and Metohija, a deputy member of Serbia's delegation to the NATO PA, and a member of the friendship groups with Croatia, Germany, Montenegro, Turkey, and the United States of America.

He was also re-elected to a second term in the Vračar municipal assembly in the 2012 local elections when the DS won a majority victory in the municipality.

=== Social Democratic Party (2014–23) ===
The DS became divided into rival factions after the 2012 election, and in early 2014 former leader Boris Tadić formed a breakaway group that was originally called the New Democratic Party (NDS). This party contested the 2014 parliamentary election in a fusion with the Greens of Serbia (Zeleni) and in alliance with other parties. Samofalov sided with Tadić in the split and received the twenty-third position on the new coalition's list, narrowly missing re-election when the list won eighteen seats. The New Democratic Party formally constituted itself as the Social Democratic Party later in the year, with Samofalov as one of its founding members.

In the 2016 parliamentary election, the SDS ran on a coalition list with the Liberal Democratic Party (LDP) and the League of Social Democrats of Vojvodina (LSV). Samofalov was a spokesperson for the SDS during the campaign, accusing Aleksandar Vučić's SNS-led government of “erosion of media freedom, destruction of democratic institutions, and devastation of the Serbian economy.” He received the thirty-fourth position on the coalition's list and was not elected when the list won thirteen seats.

He did not seek re-election to the Vračar municipal assembly in 2016. In the 2018 Belgrade city election, the SDS participated in an opposition coalition with the DS and other parties. Samofalov received the eleventh position on the coalition's list, which failed to cross the electoral threshold for assembly representation.

The SDS participated in an opposition boycott of the 2020 parliamentary election, accusing the Vučić administration of undermining Serbia's democratic institutions. This notwithstanding, it contested the concurrent municipal election in Vračar as part of an alliance of opposition parties; Samofalov led the alliance's list and was elected when it won six out of sixty-three seats, finishing third against an alliance led by the SNS. Due to the opposition boycott, he was one of the most prominent elected officials among Serbia's opposition parties during the next two years.

The opposition boycott ended in 2022, and the SDS contested that year's parliamentary election on a coalition list with the New Party (NOVA) and other parties. Samofalov received the fourth position on the coalition's list in the parliamentary contest and the twenty-seventh position on its list in the concurrent election to the Belgrade city assembly. The SDS coalition failed to cross the threshold at either level; Samofalov later said that the party had been the victim of "brutal" electoral fraud, particularly in the Belgrade vote. He was a vocal critic of Dragan Đilas in this period, accusing him of being an ally of Aleksandar Vučić and a Trojan horse in ranks of the opposition.

=== Party of Freedom and Justice (2023–present) ===
Samofalov left SDS in late June 2023 and shortly thereafter joined the Party of Freedom and Justice (SSP) led by Dragan Đilas. In leaving the SDS, he said, "It's time to redefine relations within the opposition [...] I believe that it is high time that we direct our focus towards the same goal, instead of futile mutual fights and accusations that only benefit Aleksandar Vučić." He resigned his seat in the Vračar municipal assembly on 4 September 2023.
