= Dušan Bajatović =

Serbian politician and entrepreneur

- Душан Бајатовић
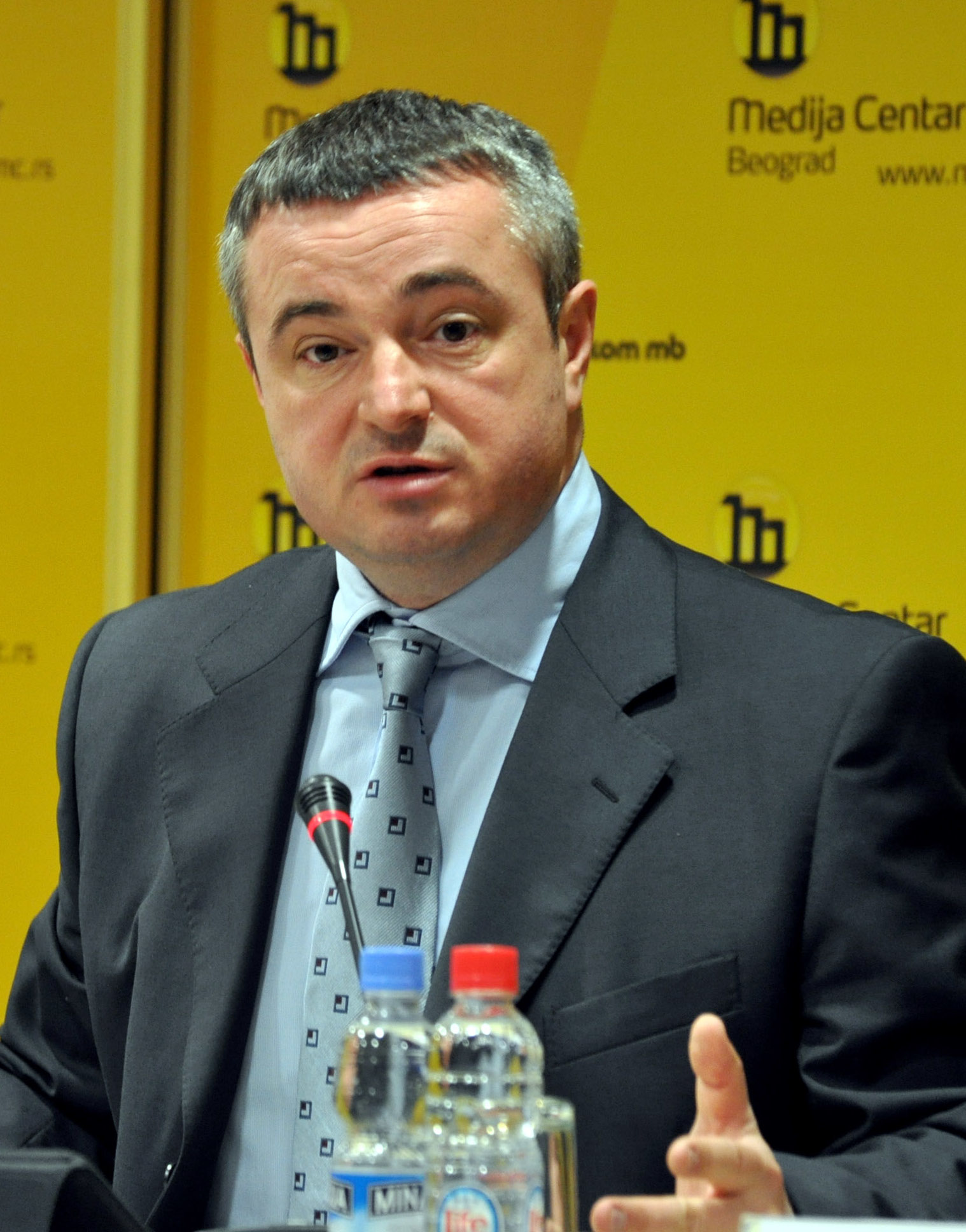
- Bajatović in 2012

General Director of Srbijagas
- Incumbent
- Assumed office November 2008
- Preceded by: Saša Ilić

Personal details
- Born: 29 November 1967 (age 58) Ravno Selo, SR Serbia, SFR Yugoslavia
- Party: Socialist Party of Serbia
- Occupation: Politician, businessman

Dušan Bajatović (Serbian Cyrillic: Душан Бајатовић; born 29 November 1967) is a Serbian politician and entrepreneur. He has served in the National Assembly of Serbia since 2007 as a member of the Socialist Party of Serbia and is a former member of both the Assembly of Serbia and Montenegro and the Assembly of Vojvodina. Once an ally of Slobodan Milošević, he was later a prominent advocate of moving the Socialist Party away from Milošević's legacy. Since 2008, he has been the general manager of the powerful public utility Srbijagas.

== Early life and private career ==
Bajatović was born in Ravno Selo, Vrbas, Vojvodina, in what was then the Socialist Republic of Serbia in the Socialist Federal Republic of Yugoslavia. He has a degree in electrical engineering with a major in systems management and a degree in economics with a major in agro-economics.

In 2003, Bajatović purchased TV Most in Novi Sad from the Socialist Party for three million dollars (which he acknowledged was on loan). He was awarded a regional broadcasting permit in 2007, even as many other stations with a similar ideological perspective were being shut down.

Sometimes criticised by rivals for his perceived level of wealth, Bajatović once remarked, "I am a Socialist, but I do not want to be a social case." On another occasion, he said, "I have no doubt that I am one of the most strongly attacked and criticized figures in the country, who is believed to be immensely rich. Sometimes I am accused of being overbearing because I am opinionated and do not flinch from expressing my views. I have no problem with all the criticism nor the harsh accusations in some media against me. I have no problem with my big mouth either."

== Early political career ==
A member of the Youth Council of Serbia before the break-up of Yugoslavia, Bajatović was a founding member of the Socialist Party of Serbia in 1990. During the period of Slobodan Milošević's rule, he was known for maintaining good relations with the independent, anti-Milošević media and for being able to express his party's views on difficult questions. In the late 1990s, he served on the executive of the Socialist Party's provincial committee in Vojvodina and was a spokesperson for the party's city council group in Novi Sad. In June 1999, in the midst of the NATO bombing of Yugoslavia, he announced a humanitarian aid package organised by the party destined for Priština.

Bajatović later became the chair of the Socialist Party in Vojvodina and a member of the party's executive committee in Serbia as a whole. He emerged as a high-profile spokesperson for the party in 2001, debriefing the media on such matters as Slobodan Milošević's state of mind in the buildup to his arrest, the party's June 2001 rally and its demands for the government to release Milošević and end the extradition of Serbian citizens to the International Criminal Tribunal for the Former Yugoslavia in The Hague, and Milošević's decision to remain as Socialist Party leader in the aftermath of his eventual extradition. Bajatović addressed several Socialist Party rallies in support of Milošević during this period.

In August 2001, Bajatović was appointed to a new nine-member body in the leadership of the Socialist Party known as the secretariat, which was entrusted with deciding on "the most important strategic issues for the party." The following May, he became a party vice-president. Bajatović informed the media in 2002 that Socialist Party politicians Nikola Šainović and Vlajko Stojiljković would not voluntarily surrender to the war crimes tribunal in The Hague; he later indicated that he did not believe former Serbian president Milan Milutinović would surrender voluntarily either.

Notwithstanding his general support for Milošević in this period, Bajatović ultimately became aligned with a reformist faction in the Socialist Party led by Ivica Dačić. He remarked in September 2002 that the party's relationship with Milošević would need to become more reciprocal, noting that some of Milošević's recent communications to the party could be perceived as dictates. He accused Milošević's wife Mirjana Marković of trying to take over and radicalise the party, and he opposed Milošević's efforts to place Bogoljub Bjelica into a position of party leadership.

Bajatović led a protest against the Basic Law of Vojvodina in Novi Sad in early 2003, describing it as a separatist document.

== Federal and provincial representative ==
Bajatović received the fourth position on the Socialist Party's electoral list in the 2003 Serbian parliamentary election. The party won twenty-two mandates. Notwithstanding his high position on the list, Bajatović chose not to serve in the Socialist Party's delegation to the parliament that followed. (From 2000 to 2011, Serbian parliamentary mandates were awarded to sponsoring parties or coalitions rather than to individual candidates, and it was common practice for mandates to be awarded out of numerical order.) He was instead selected on 10 February 2004, as one of the party's representatives in the federal Assembly of Serbia and Montenegro. He served as party whip, and in May 2004 he was appointed to the assembly's commission for the control of the state union's security services.

Soon after his appointment to the assembly, Bajatović indicated that the Socialist Party would not offer parliamentary support to the government of Serbia and Montenegro if Boris Tadić was retained as minister of defence. Tadić was, in fact, replaced shortly thereafter. Bajatović later threatened that the Socialist Party would withdraw its vital parliamentary support for the government of Serbia under Vojislav Koštunica if extraditions to The Hague continued. In April 2006, he introduced a motion to remove Vuk Drašković from his position as Serbia and Montenegro's minister of foreign affairs, asserting that Drašković had become a pro-Albanian lobbyist in relation to the status of Kosovo within Serbia.

In August 2005, Bajatović remarked that the Socialist Party's relationship with Slobodan Milošević had become "a strain" that needed to be removed. Notwithstanding this, he led a minute of silence for Milošević in the Assembly of Serbia and Montenegro following the former Serbian leader's death in custody in 2006.

The federal assembly ceased to exist in June 2006, when Montenegro declared its independence.

Bajatović also led the Socialist Party's list in the 2004 Vojvodina assembly election and served as an opposition member in the provincial assembly from 30 October 2004 until his resignation on 19 March 2007.

== Member of the National Assembly of Serbia ==
Bajatović received the sixth position on the Socialist Party's electoral list in the 2007 Serbian parliamentary election and, on this occasion, joined the party's parliamentary delegation after the election, serving in opposition to Koštunica's government. He strongly opposed calls by some Vojvodina representatives in August 2007 to create a federated Serbia. He received the ninth position on an electoral alliance headed by the Socialist Party for the 2008 election and was again chosen as part of the party's delegation after the campaign.

Following the 2008 election, the Socialist Party joined a coalition government led by the pro-European Union Democratic Party. There were rumours that Bajatović would become internal affairs minister, though ultimately this did not happen and party leader Ivica Dačić received the position instead.

The Socialist Party had shifted away from some of its former positions by this time and, specifically, had changed its policy toward the extradition of suspected war criminals; following Dačić's appointment, Bajatović assured the media that the new minister would not threaten relations with tribunal authorities in The Hague. A report from this period described Bajatović as being on the technocratic wing of the Socialist Party, "favouring personal, economic interests over political ideology." He was also described as one of the party's leading advocates of an alliance with the Democratic Party, and it was noted that he had helped to broker municipal alliances between the Democratic Party and the Socialist Party in Vojvodina prior to their alliance at the national level. He was deputy leader of the Socialist Party's assembly group in this period and served as deputy head of the parliamentary committee for state security.

Bajatović ran for mayor of Novi Sad in May 2008; during the campaign, he was quoted as saying, "Novi Sad is being run by a dark quartet headed by [Vojvodina leader] Igor Mirović and I am ready to fight them, even if I end up in a ditch with a bullet in my head." He was defeated by Igor Pavličić of the Democratic Party. He also headed the Socialist Party's electoral list in the 2008 Vojvodina parliamentary election, although he declined to take an assembly seat after the election.

Serbia's electoral system was reformed in 2011, such that parliamentary mandates were awarded in numerical order to candidates on successful lists. Bajatović received positions near the top of the Socialist Party's coalition electoral lists in the 2012, 2014, and 2016 elections and was returned to the assembly each time. Bajatović is currently the deputy chair of the assembly's security services control committee; a member of the committee on finance, state budget, and control of public spending; a member of Serbia's delegation to the parliamentary assembly of the Collective Security Treaty Organization (where Serbia has observer status); and a member of the parliamentary friendship groups with Austria, China, Germany, Iran, Italy, Russia, Sweden, and the United States of America.

The Serbian Progressive Party emerged as the largest party in the assembly after the 2012 election. Bajatović subsequently took part in negotiations for a renewed alliance with the Democratic Party, but the Socialists instead formed a new coalition government with the Progressives. After the 2014 election (in which the Progressives won a landslide victory), it was reported that Bajatović urged the Socialists in leave the coalition if they did not receive several important positions. The party ultimately remained in government, and their alliance with the Progressives remains in effect as of 2017.

Bajatović supported the third revision of Vojvodina's statute on autonomy in 2014, arguing that it was "a good framework, which will allow Vojvodina to fulfill its needs." He led the Socialist Party's coalition electoral lists in Vojvodina in the 2012 and 2016 elections and served another term in the provincial assembly from 22 June to 4 October 2012. In 2016, he attended the first meeting of the provincial assembly and then resigned his mandate on 20 June.

== General Manager of Srbijagas ==
In November 2008, Bajatović was appointed to replace Saša Ilić as general manager of Srbijagas. As this is not a ministerial position, he was not required to resign from parliament. One month after his appointment, he concluded a significant deal between Srbijagas and the Russian firm Gazprom wherein Serbia sold a 51% stake in its state oil monopoly to Russia in return for the construction of a strategic Russian pipeline through Serbia via an initiative that ultimately became known as South Stream. Bajatović took part in several further deals with Gazprom after this time, and in late 2009 he indicated Serbia's ambition to become a major hub for the distribution of Russian gas in Europe. In November 2009, Srbijagas and Gazprom registered a joint company called Juzni Tok Srbija (South Stream Serbia). The South Stream project ultimately collapsed but has since been replaced by the successor projects Turkish Stream and Tesla Pipeline.

Serbia experienced significant fuel shortages in early 2009, when a diplomatic row between Russia and Ukraine hindered the flow of gas to the country. Bajatović negotiated for emergency supplies from Germany and Hungary and said that the Ukrainian government was primarily to blame for the crisis. He later took part in negotiations in Moscow that allowed Russian gas to flow to the country again, ending the crisis situation after almost two weeks. Subsequently, he suggested that Serbia permit Gazprom to build commercial gas reserves in Serbia.

In late 2009, Bajatović indicated that Srbijagas would seek a concession to construct a pipeline in Bosnia and Hercegovina, with separate sections leading to Sarajevo and Banja Luka.

He has strongly opposed suggestions that Srbijagas be privatised, saying in 2009, "If the government changes tomorrow, I won't be a director any more, but every government and the Serbian economy will need Srbijagas, and that is why a large company needs to be created that will stay in the ownership of the state."

Bajatović had an extremely strained relationship with Zorana Mihajlović, a Progressive Party politician who served as Serbia's energy minister from 2012 to 2014. Mihajlović repeatedly sought to remove Bajatović from his position but ultimately could not do so (reportedly due to pressure from Russia, which wanted Bajatović to remain as the principal Serbian overseer of the South Stream project). Following the 2014 elections, Mihajlović remarked that Bajatović was, in her view, "part of the problem [of Srbijagas] and ... cannot be part of the solution." Notwithstanding this, he was kept in his position by the government.

Serbia's Anti-Corruption Agency gave Bajatović an order to resign in September 2014 on the grounds that he was in a conflict of interest position. He appealed the decision. In October 2015, the Anti-Corruption Agency recommended that the government dismiss him. Bajatović responded to the situation by saying, "I do not want to comment on this until the proceedings are over. Everything is still in process, and in the past months I have handed all of the documents that they requested." He was not removed from his position.

In June 2015, Serbian prime minister Aleksandar Vučić called on the country to diversify its energy sources and to join an American pipeline operating through Azerbaijan, rather than waiting for Russia to finish the Turkish Stream project. Bajatović took a different line during the same period, supporting the Russian project and accusing the European Union of obstructing Serbia's energy interests. In March 2016, he noted that Russia's gas supplies to Serbia via Ukraine would end in three years, noted his desire to build a gas interconnection with Bulgaria as a transitional solution, and called for more financial support from the European Union.

In 2014, an anonymous media source indicated that Serbian government could not remove Bajatović from his position even if it wanted to, due to an informal Russian veto. "The Russians insist that Bajatović remains the director until the South Stream project is completed. This is practically a state interest," the source said. Bajatović has openly acknowledged his support from Russia, quipping in early 2016 that he would remain the leader of Srbijagas "even at the cost of the [Socialist Party] remaining out of the new government."
