= Miodrag Majić =

Serbian legal scholar, judge and author (born 1969)

- Миодраг Мајић
- Born: 17 November 1969 (age 56); Belgrade, Socialist Federal Republic of Yugoslavia
- Other name: Miša Majić
- Education: University of Belgrade
- Occupations: Legal scholar, judge, author
- Notable work: Deca zla
- Website: https://misamajic.com/

Miodrag Majić is a Serbian legal scholar, judge and author. He is the judge of the Court of Appeals in Belgrade, Serbia, and the author of numerous books, legal commentaries and articles. Majić is known as a devoted opponent of penal populism in Serbia, which caused various Serbian politicians (most notably Maja Gojković) to lead smear campaigns against him in 2019. In 2019, Majic authored a bestselling crime novel titled Deca zla (еng. Children of evil) which combines realistic depictions of criminal procedure in Serbia with themes of occultism and conspiracy theories.

== Biography ==
Miodrag Majić was born on 17 November 1969 in Belgrade, then the capital of Socialist Federal Republic of Yugoslavia. He graduated from University of Belgrade Faculty of Law in 1995 and defended his doctorate in 2008. He speaks Serbian, English and Russian languages. Majić is the father of two sons and a daughter.

== Notable works ==
- Primena međunarodnog krivičnog prava u nacionalnim pravnim sistemima, Službeni glasnik Srbije, 2009
- Nature, Importance and limits of finding the Truth in criminal proceedings, Majić, Ilić, Pravni fakultet Univerziteta u Beogradu, 2013
- Вештина писања првостепене кривичне пресуде, Službeni glasnik Srbije, 2015
- Deca zla, Vulkan, 2019
