= Miloš Jovanović =

Serbian politician, lawyer, and political scientist

- Милош Јовановић
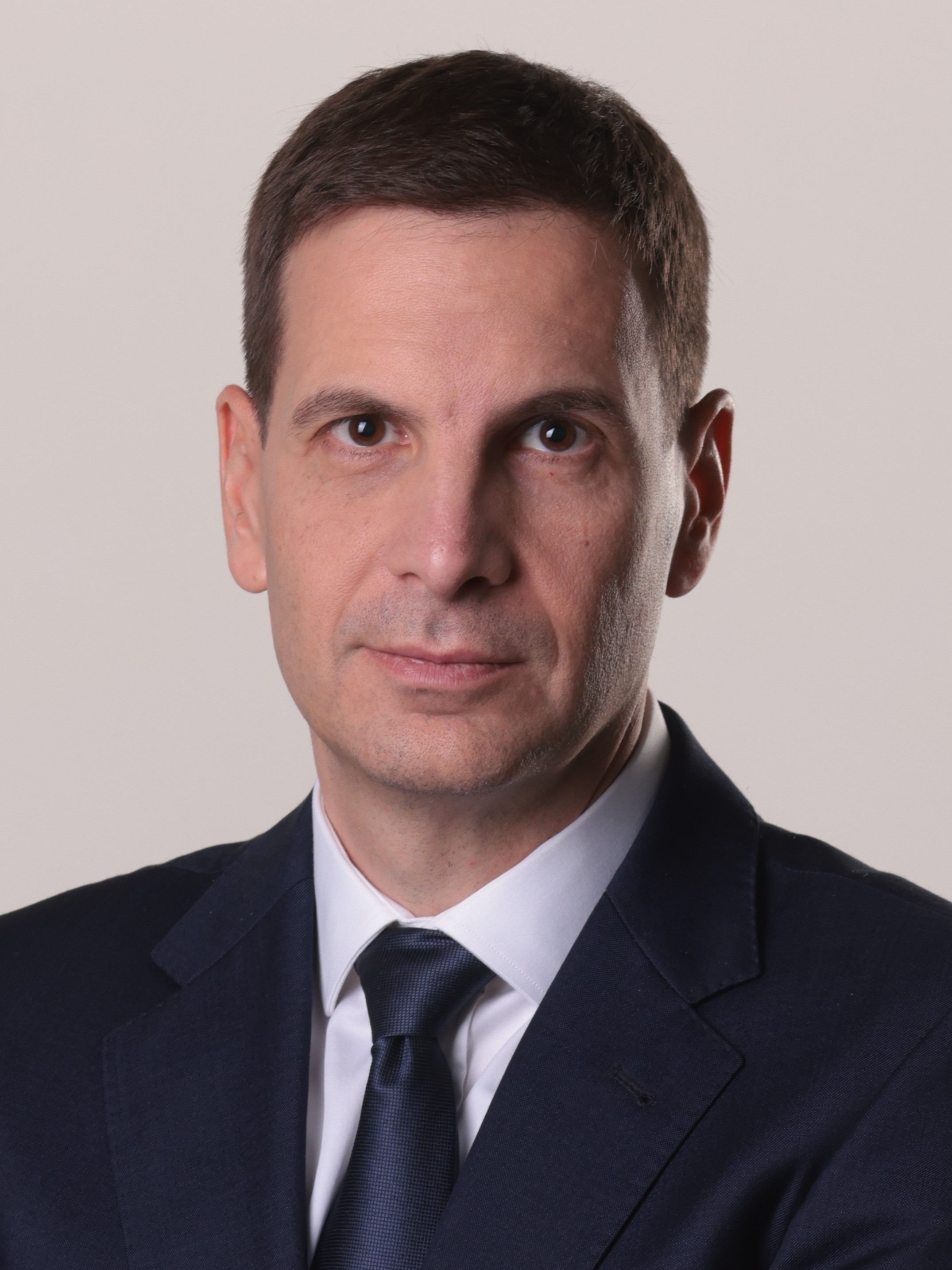
- Jovanović in 2023

President of the New Democratic Party of Serbia
- In office 28 May 2017 – 26 October 2026
- Preceded by: Sanda Rašković Ivić

Member of the National Assembly
- In office 31 May 2012 – 9 October 2013
- In office 1 August 2022 – 26 October 2026

Personal details
- Born: 19 August 1976 (age 50) Belgrade, SR Serbia, SFR Yugoslavia
- Citizenship: Serbian; French
- Party: NDSS
- Education: Panthéon-Sorbonne University
- Occupation: Political scientist; lawyer; politician

Military service
- Allegiance: Armed Forces of Serbia and Montenegro
- Branch/service: 63rd Parachute Brigade

Miloš Jovanović (Serbian Cyrillic: Милош Јовановић, pronounced [mîloʃ joʋǎːnoʋitɕ]; born 19 August 1976) is a Serbian lawyer, political scientist and former politician. He served as the president of the New Democratic Party of Serbia (formerly known as the Democratic Party of Serbia) from 2017 to 2026. He is a docent at the Faculty of Law, University of Belgrade. Jovanović was a presidential candidate in the 2022 election, in which he placed third with 6% of popular vote.

After his party failed to receive enough votes to surpass the electoral threshold in the 2026 parliamentary election, on 26 October 2026 he resigned as party president and retired from politics.

== Early life and education ==
He was born on 19 August 1976 in Belgrade. He received his high school education at the Fifth Belgrade Gymnasium. He graduated from the University of Paris 1 Pantheon-Sorbonne in 1999 at the Sorbonne Law School, and in 2000 from the Department of Political Science at the Sorbonne.

At the same university, he completed his master's degree in international relations in 2001 with a paper on the topic: La reconnaissance internationale des indépendances slovène et croate ("International Recognition of Slovenian and Croatian Independence"). His mentor was the professor Charles Zorgbibe.

He defended his doctoral dissertation in December 2010 on the topic: Légitimité et légitimation du recours à la force dans l’après-guerre froide. Étude de cas: l’intervention militaire de l’OTAN contre la République fédérale de Yougoslavie (1999), ("Legitimacy and legitimation of the use of force in the post-Cold War period. Case study: NATO military intervention against the Federal Republic of Yugoslavia in 1999"). During his studies, he learned English and French. He has both Serbian and French citizenships.

== Professional career ==
From 2001 to 2005, he was in charge of conducting exercises in Constitutional Law and Political Institutions, as well as Comparative Political Systems at the Faculty of Law of the University of Paris and the Pantheon-Sorbonne.

From 2006 to 2011, he worked at the Institute for International Politics and Economics in Belgrade as a research associate. In October 2011, he was elected assistant professor, in February 2014, assistant professor, and in March 2019, associate professor of Introduction to European Integration Law and International Relations at the Faculty of Law, University of Belgrade, where he continues to teach.

He was a member of the management board of the Slobodan Jovanović Fund. Some of the members of the board are: Matija Bećković (president), Kosta Čavoški, Slobodan Rakitić, Vladeta Janković, Vojislav Koštunica and Slobodan Samardžić.

== Political career ==
Since July 2007, he has been the advisor to the Minister for Kosovo and Metohija, Slobodan Samardžić for international legal issues, and he was a member of the Serbian delegation in the negotiation process on the future status of Kosovo and Metohija under the auspices of the international mediators. In February 2008, he was appointed one of the two coordinators of the legal team of the Government of the Republic of Serbia.

He was the temporary vice-president of the Democratic Party of Serbia city board in Belgrade and the political advisor to the president of the Democratic Party of Serbia, Vojislav Koštunica, and after that the vice-president of the party.

After the 2012 Serbian parliamentary elections, he became a member of the National Assembly of the Republic of Serbia. He was a member of the Delegation to the NATO Parliamentary Assembly, and a member of the Parliamentary Committee on Defense and Home Affairs.

On 9 October 2013, he returned the mandate to the Democratic Party of Serbia, but remained the party's vice-president. Shortly after, he resigned from all positions in the party, because he believed that the party leadership was not doing everything necessary to preserve Kosovo and Metohija as a part of Serbia, and that the attitude of the party towards the government was too mild. Above all, he believed that it was necessary to gather all patriotic forces into one coalition, which would consist of both political organisations and intellectuals and prominent public figures, and which would be a necessary opposition to the Serbian political system within which, with the Serbian Progressive Party coming to power, consensus was reached on the surrender of Kosovo and Metohija. He has written and spoken about it in public since the very signing of the Brussels Agreement, in April 2013.

He is the president of the Democratic Party of Serbia since 28 May 2017.

Jovanović ran for mayor at the 2018 Belgrade City Assembly election, and received 1.12% of the votes.

In November 2019, Jovanović announced a new coalition for the 2020 Serbian parliamentary election called "Broom 2020", along with the group of small political movements like the Human Shield, Movement for the Indigenous of Kraljevo, Team for Life, and with the president of the Military Syndicate of Serbia, Novica Antić. The party only won 2.2% of the votes failing to pass the census to enter the parliament.

On 21 July 2020, Jovanović announced a possible change of the name of the party.

In May 2021, his party formed coalition with the Movement for the Restoration of the Kingdom of Serbia for the 2022 Serbian general election. The coalition won 5.37% of the popular vote, thus secured 15 seats in the National Assembly. Jovanović also run for the president the same year. He won 6.10% of the votes in the 1st round, which made him the third best ranked candidate in the elections.

Jovanović's party changed its name to New Democratic Party of Serbia following the 15th assembly on 29 May 2022.

After his party failed to receive enough votes to surpass the electoral threshold in the 2026 presidential election, on 26 October 2026 he resigned as party president and retired from politics.

== Political positions ==
Jovanović is a self described right wing politician, and a eurosceptic. He claims that the European Union is a dead project, and that there should be an open debate in Serbia about the country joining the European Union.

He is against the recognition of Kosovo by Serbia, and claims that the best possible solution is keeping the status quo between Serbia and its breakaway province.

In an interview for Danas in May 2020, Jovanović talked about the 2020 Serbian parliamentary election campaign, and the Yugoslav Wars. When commenting on the conflicts, he stated:

"Of course, history must not be forgotten. On the contrary, historical memory must be nurtured because the Serbian people are the biggest victims of the 1990s. The two biggest crimes have just been committed against us. The first was in 1995, when Croatia carried out the largest ethnic cleansing and expelled Serbs from Krajina. The second was in 1999, when NATO committed aggression against our country and committed the most serious crime – a crime against peace"

Jovanović is also a denier of the Srebrenica genocide.

== Personal ==
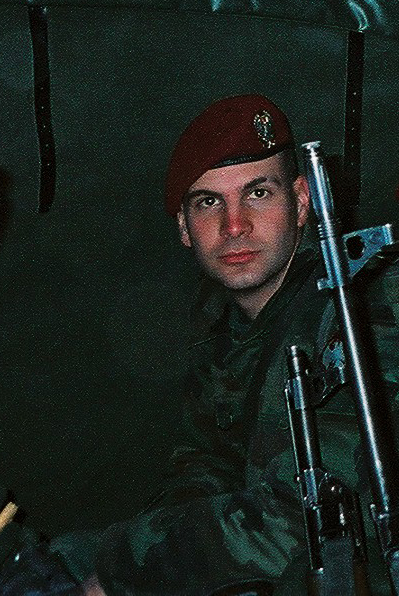
Jovanović during his time in the 63rd Parachute Brigade

He served in the Armed Forces of Serbia and Montenegro as a member of the 63rd Parachute Brigade and participated in the International Parachuting All-Around Competition in 2006. He is married, and has two children.

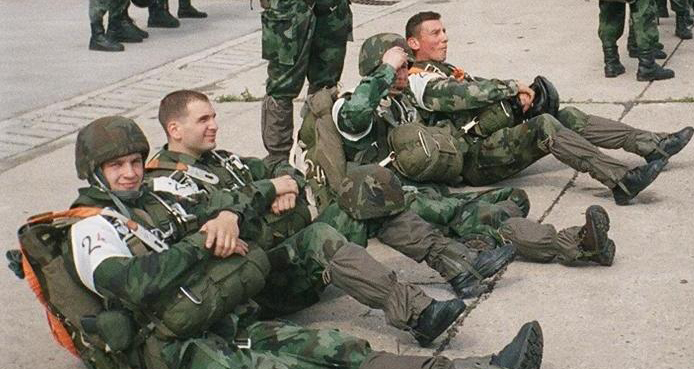
Jovanović, second from the left, at the 2006 Parachute All-Around International Competition

== Publications ==
Jovanović is the author of several professional and newspaper articles, some of which are:

- Miloš Jovanović, “Le Royaume-Uni et le plan Briand : une réaction toujours d’actualité ?”, in Yves Petit, Branko Rakić, Maja Lukić-Radović (dir.), L’idée d’Union européenne de 1929 à 2016: du projet d’Aristide Briand au retrait du Royaume-Uni, Univerzitet u Beogradu – Pravni fakultet, Belgrade, 2017, pp. 41–56.
- Ивана Крстић, Милош Јовановић, „Међународноправни статус НДХ" у Борис Беговић, Зоран С. Мирковић (ур.), Правни поредак Незавсине Државе Хрватске, Правни факултет Универзитета у Београду, 2017, стр. 183–216.
- „Ка неопходном препороду српске војске", у Светлана Курћубић Ружић (уред.), Ка српском становишту, Евро-Ђунти, Београд 2014, стр. 127–152.
- „У потрази за снажном државом – или како излечити институционалну импотентност ‘Петооктобарске републике", у Светлана Курћубић Ружић (уред.), Ка српском становишту, Евро-Ђунти, Београд 2014, стр. 95–125.
- „Полупредседнички режим француске V Републике", у Оливер Николић, Владан Петров (прир.), Увод у право Француске, Институт за упоредно право/Правни факултет Универзитета у Београду, Београд 2013, pp. 93–119.
- „Француска, НАТО и ‘Европа одбране’", Анали Правног факултета у Београду, бр.2/2013, pp. 197–214.
- „Сербия и Европейский Союз. Вопрос безопасности или политика абсурда", ЗВЕНЬЯ, Экспертное издание Фонда исторической перспективы, 2013 №1 (16), Москва, pp. 139–174.
- „O putevima i stranputicama", Danas, 2013.
- „Послехладноратовски свет између идеологије и политике силе", Српска политичка мисао, бр. 2, 2013, pp. 187–204
- „Нада је умрла, живела нада!", Политика, 2013.
- „Изградња ЕУ кроз призму Заједничке безбедносне и одбрамбене политике", Европско законодавство, 42/12 (2012), pp. 313–333.
- „Recognition of Kosovo Independence as a Violation of International Law", Belgrade Law Review, 2008, Vol. 3. стр. 108–140.
- „Доктрина праведног рата и међународно право". Међународни проблеми, Vol. LIX, бр. 2–3, Jun 2007, pp. 243–265.
- „A Comment on the Judgement of the International Court of Justice in the Case Concerning the Application of the Genocide Convention", Review of international affairs, Vol. LVII, No. 1125-1126, January–June (2007). стр. 5–15.
- „Тужба БиХ за геноцид пред Међународним судом правде: правна разматрања и политичке последице", Међународна политика, бр. 1123, јули-септембар 2006, pp. 5–13.
- „Питање независности Косова и Метохије у огледалу међународног јавног права", у Слободан Ерић (прир.), Косово и Метохија – аргументи за останак у Србији, Геополитика, Београд, 2006, pp. 93–118.

Party political offices
Preceded by Sanda Rašković Ivić	President of the Democratic Party of Serbia; 2016–present	Incumbent
