= Miladin Ševarlić =

Serbian politician

PhD Miladin Ševarlić
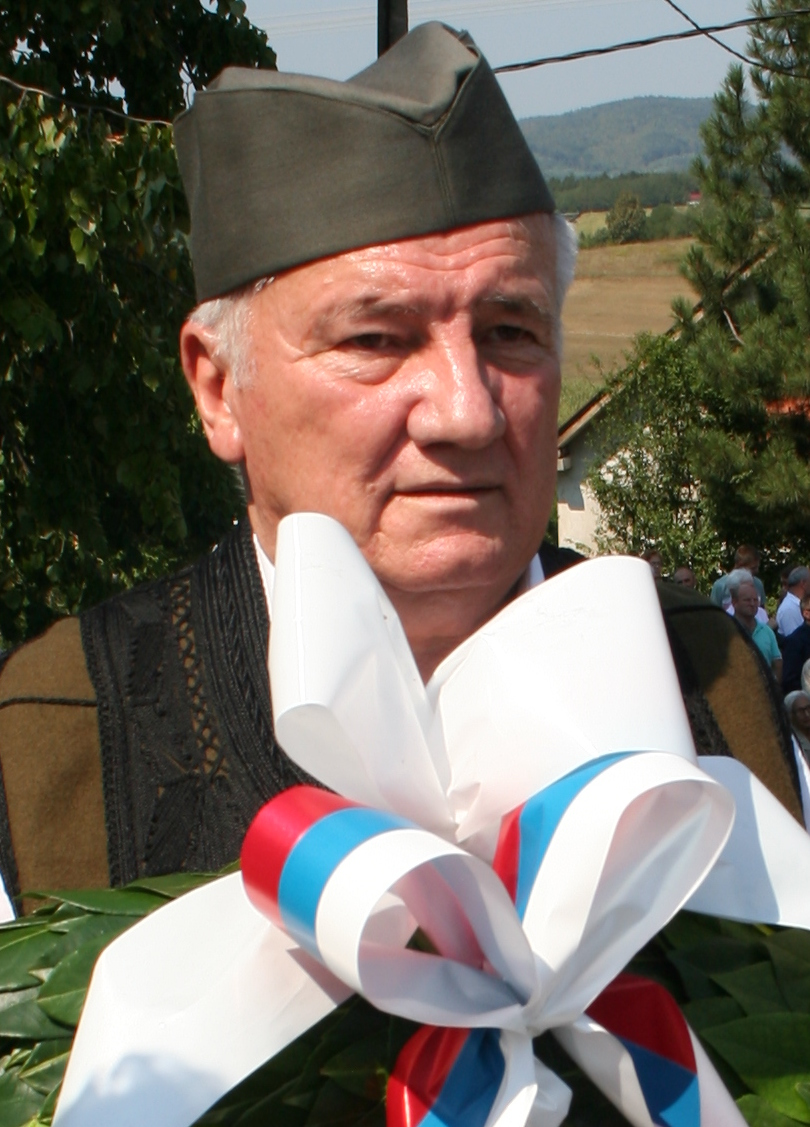

Member of the National Assembly of the Republic of Serbia
- Incumbent
- Assumed office June 3, 2016

Personal details
- Born: June 12, 1949 (age 77) Čačak, PR Serbia, FPR Yugoslavia
- Party: Independent
- Education: University of Belgrade
- Occupation: professor, politician

Miladin Ševarlić (Serbian Cyrillic: Миладин Шеварлић; born June 12, 1949) is an agricultural economist, professor of agriculture, and politician in Serbia. He served in the National Assembly of Serbia from 2016 to 2020 as an independent member. Until February 2019, he was a member of the Dveri parliamentary group.

== Early life and academic career ==
Ševarlić was born in Čačak and raised in the neighbouring community of Preljina, in what was then the People's Republic of Serbia in the Federal People's Republic of Yugoslavia. He received a bachelor's degree (1973), a master's degree (1982), and a PhD (1989) from the University of Belgrade Faculty of Agriculture and taught for several years at the same institution, becoming a full professor in 2001. He has published about three hundred scientific and professional papers and is known as one of the leading agricultural economists in Serbia. He retired from the University of Belgrade in 2014.

Ševarlić as an opponent of genetically modified food and has argued that introducing genetically modified crops to Serbia will undermine local agriculture by creating a dependence on imported seeds. In 2013, he argued that Serbia would "lose 500 million euros a year through purchase of genetically modified seeds" and urged that country to remain a GMO-free zone. The following year, he noted that genetically modified soy products were being planted in different parts of Serbia as the result of smuggling and urged the government to bring criminal charges against the offenders.

In 1999, while serving as executive chair of the Yugoslavian Association of Agricultural Economists, he signed an open letter to agricultural economists in other countries against the NATO bombing of Yugoslavia.

Ševarlić urged the government of Serbia to invest one billion Euros in the food and agriculture sectors in 2014, arguing that this would revive the country's agricultural sector. He stated that Serbia could find investors for the export of its products, mainly to Russia, Kazakhstan, Belarus, and Africa.

He is an opponent of Serbia's plans to permit the sale of agricultural lands to international buyers as a condition of joining the European Union (EU). In 2017, he was quoted as saying, "it is not even known whether and when [Serbia] will become a member of that union, thus the relationship with the EU may be considered neo-colonialism".

Ševarlić lives in the Belgrade municipality of Zemun.

== Politician ==
Ševarlić became the youngest ever member of the Belgrade City Assembly in 1967, serving on the education and cultural council during the mayoralty of Branko Pešić.

He received the seventh position on a combined electoral list of the Democratic Party of Serbia and Dveri as a non-party candidate in the 2016 Serbian parliamentary election and was elected when the list won thirteen members. The election was won by the Serbian Progressive Party and its allies, and Ševarlić sat as an opposition member. He was a member of the assembly's agriculture, forestry, and water management committee; a deputy member of the committee on the diaspora and Serbs in the region and the committee on the economy, regional development, trade, tourism, and energy; and a member of the parliamentary friendship groups with Belarus, Kazakhstan, North Macedonia, Russia, and Slovenia. In 2017, he attracted media attention for reciting an anti-GMO song by the poet Ljubivoje Ršumović in the National Assembly.

He left the Dveri parliamentary group in February 2019, after disagreeing with the party's boycott of the assembly.

During his time in parliament, Ševarlić gave several press conferences dressed in traditional Serbian folk clothing. In 2020, he conducted a one-day hunger strike on the steps of the national assembly to protest the Serbian government's call for Serbs in Kosovo to participate in disputed entity's governmental institutions.

Ševarlić received the sixth position on the combined Healthy Serbia–Better Serbia electoral list in the 2020 Serbian parliamentary election as a non-party candidate. The list did not cross the electoral threshold to win representation in the assembly.
