= Belgrade Pride =

Annual LGBT event in Belgrade, Serbia

Belgrade Pride Парада поноса у Београду

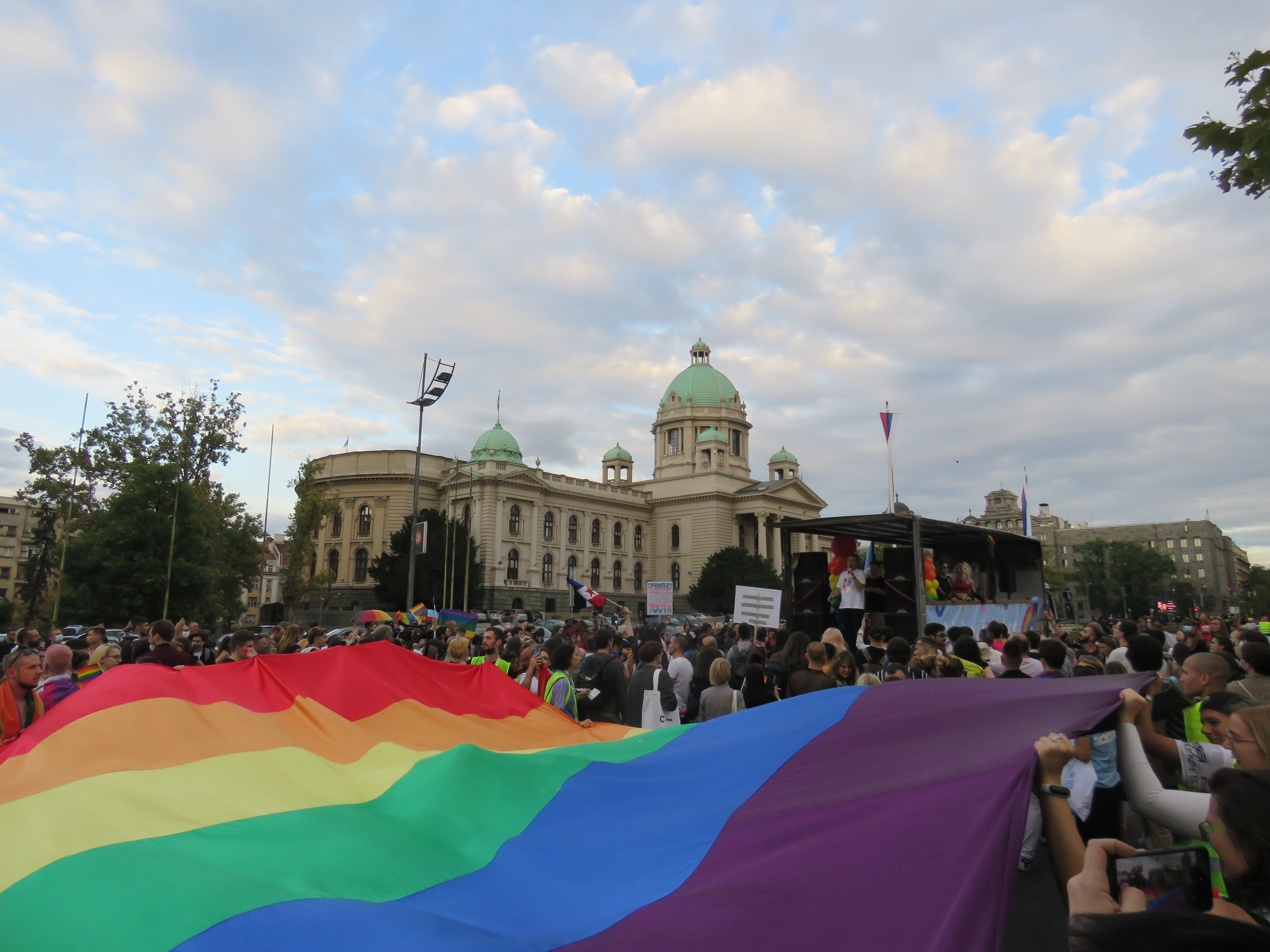
- 2021 Belgrade Pride in front of the House of the National Assembly of the Republic of Serbia
- Status: Active
- Frequency: Annually
- Venue: open air & multiple venues
- Locations: Belgrade, Serbia
- Country: Serbia
- Years active: 2001–present
- Inaugurated: 30 June 2001
- Most recent: 5 September 2026
- Attendance: 2,103 (2026)
- Major events: Celebration of the lesbian, gay, bisexual, and transgender (LGBT) people and their allies
- Website: Official website

Belgrade Pride (Serbian: Парада поноса у Београду, romanized: Parada ponosa u Beogradu) is an annual pride parade held in Belgrade, Serbia to celebrate the lesbian, gay, bisexual, and transgender (LGBT) people and their allies. The first event was held in June 2001 and was subject to violence, as was its next event in 2010 which sparked an anti-gay riot. Since 2016, Belgrade Pride has been organized annually without bans. The manifestation is a part of the Belgrade Pride Week, which in addition to the pride parade itself also includes cultural events, workshops, discussion panels, parties and a live concert as the closing event.

== Background ==
Following the collapse of Yugoslavia and during the ensuing Yugoslav Wars in Croatia, Bosnia and Kosovo, LGBTQ activists worked on opposing the rise of ultranationalist regimes in collaboration with feminist and peace organizations. During this time, homosexuality was decriminalised in Serbia. LGBTQ activists then worked to help topple the semi-authoritarian regimes in Serbia and Croatia following the 1995 Dayton Agreement. After the overthrow of Slobodan Milošević's regime in 2000, and then the end of the Yugoslav Wars in 2001, Serbian and Croatian LGBTQ activists began to alter their activism toward a politics of visibility.

== History ==
=== 2001: "Massacre Pride" ===
The first ever attempt at the organization of a pride event in Belgrade occurred in 2001, yet it ended up with the violent assault on the organizers and participants by sport fans and extreme right wing activists. Footage of the event shows participants being beaten in the street as the Serbian police stood by. The event was thus dubbed "massacre Pride". Following this, liberal Serbian Prime Minister Zoran Đinđić was assassinated. These events prompted a change in strategy for LGBTQ activists in the country, who as an alternative to claiming public space formed their own cultural spaces.

=== 2010–14: "Bunker Pride", "midnight Pride", and 2014 authorisation ===
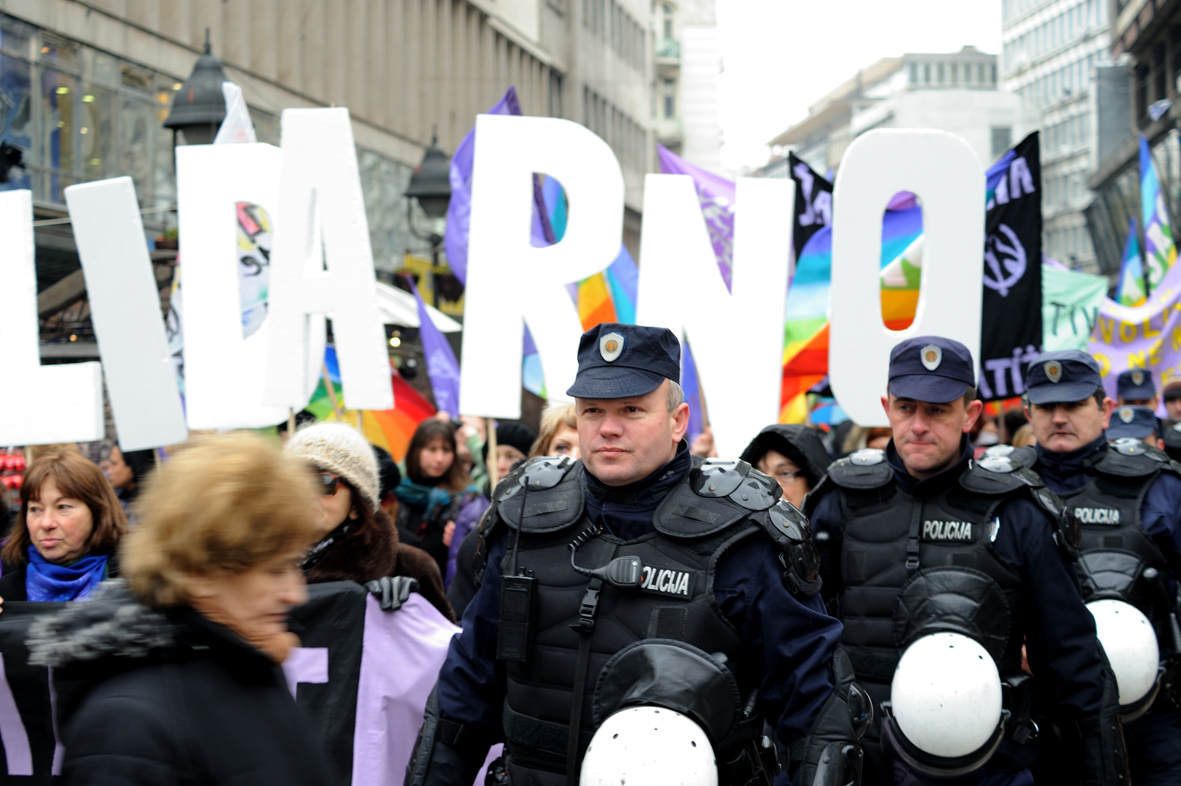
Belgrade Pride 2010, or "bunker Pride", was supported by heavy police protection

Authorities prevented further efforts to organize and register the event until 2010, a year after the adoption of the Law on Prohibition of Discrimination. That Pride, which was held in October 2010 far from the city centre, is remembered for vandalization of the city and heavy violence from hooligans aimed at attendees of the pride, as well as at police. According to police reports, 140 people were injured during the event, out of whom 120 were police officers. The event that year was dubbed "bunker Pride", in reference to its distance from the city centre and the separation of the parade from potential onlookers by walls of police. The events from the 2010 Belgrade Pride were referenced in the 2011 movie The Parade, directed by Srđan Dragojević, which attracted significant audience in Serbia and former Yugoslavia, becoming one of the decade's commercially highest performing films.

Afterwards, Belgrade Pride again faced bans from the governing bodies. In 2013, possibly as a result of the pressures of European Union (EU) accession requirements which insisted that the holding of peaceful pride parades was essential for membership consideration, the Constitutional Court of Serbia ruled that the 2011 ban had been a violation of the constitutionally guaranteed right to freedom of assembly, awarding damages to the organizers. Despite this, an attempted 2013 Pride celebration was cancelled in the middle of the night, prompting a brief protest gathering in Belgrade that was dubbed "midnight Pride".

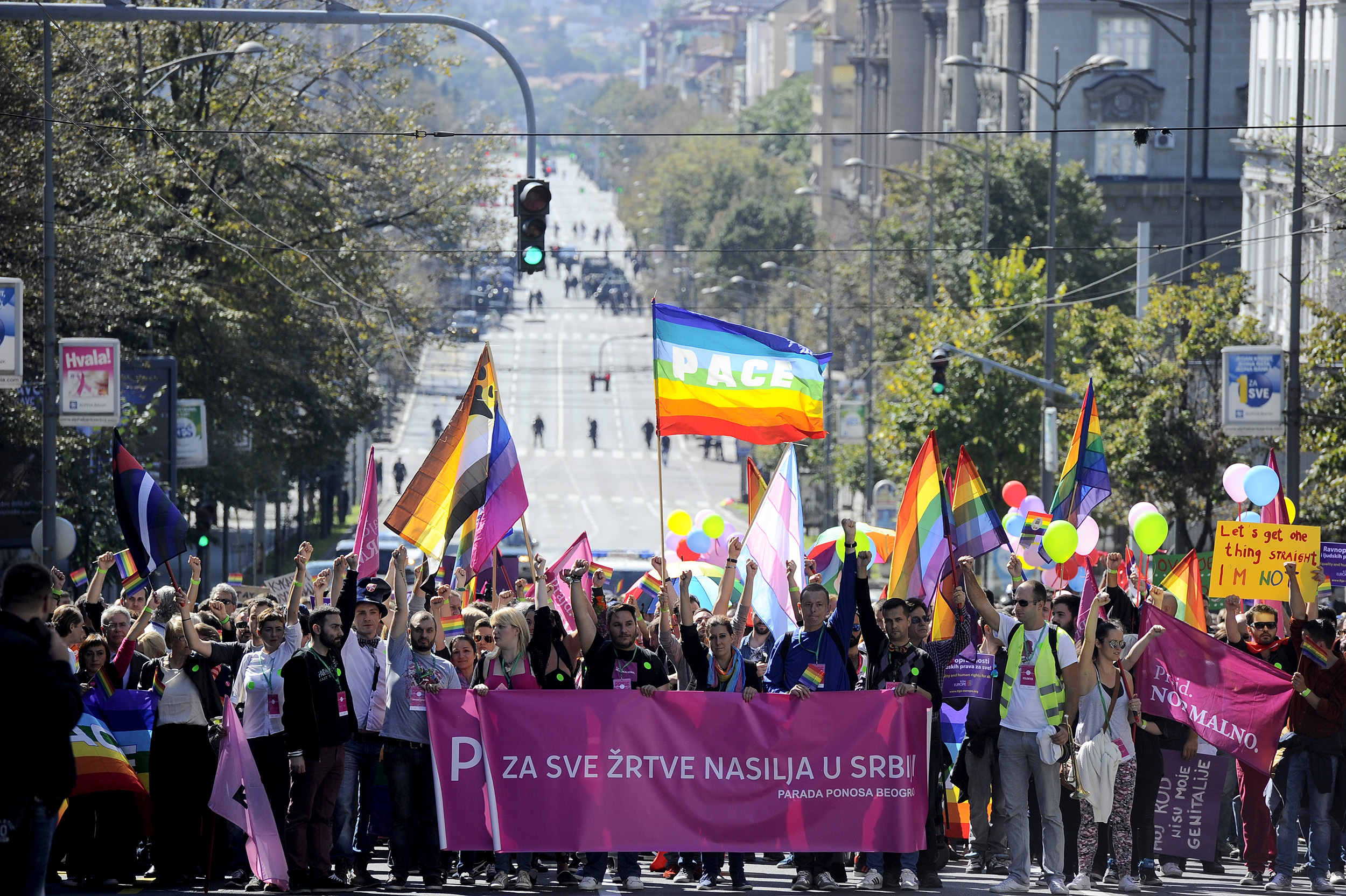
Belgrade Pride 2014 was the first to be authorised since 2010 and was also held under heavy security measures

Pride was authorised in the Belgrade city centre in 2014, during which time Serbia was under intense pressure to demonstrate a commitment to human rights to the European Union. This parade, attended by a few hundred marchers, was encircled by 7,000 police in full riot gear, and the Belgrade downtown was entirely cordoned off to the general public in anticipation of attackers, with all who entered being frisked, screened with a metal detector, made to wear a neon green wristband for identification, and given a small rainbow flag. The march, which was short and began late, was attended by several EU ministers and watched by police helicopters overhead. The event was generally peaceful, which organiser Boban Stojanović hailed as a great achievement. Serbian Prime Minister Aleksandar Vučić said, "Not one window was broken today and for that we have to credit the security forces because they showed that they can maintain security." The EU stated that the parade was a "milestone in the modern history of democratic Serbia." This march was followed by a protest by thousands of Serbian nationalists and Orthodox Christians later in the day, who chanted "kill the gays", and "Serbia and Russia, we don't need the European Union."

=== 2016–present: Yearly events and increasing tolerance ===
The third Belgrade Pride parade was held in September 2016, and this was largely without any violence. Since then, the event has been organized annually, except in 2020 due to the COVID-19 pandemic.

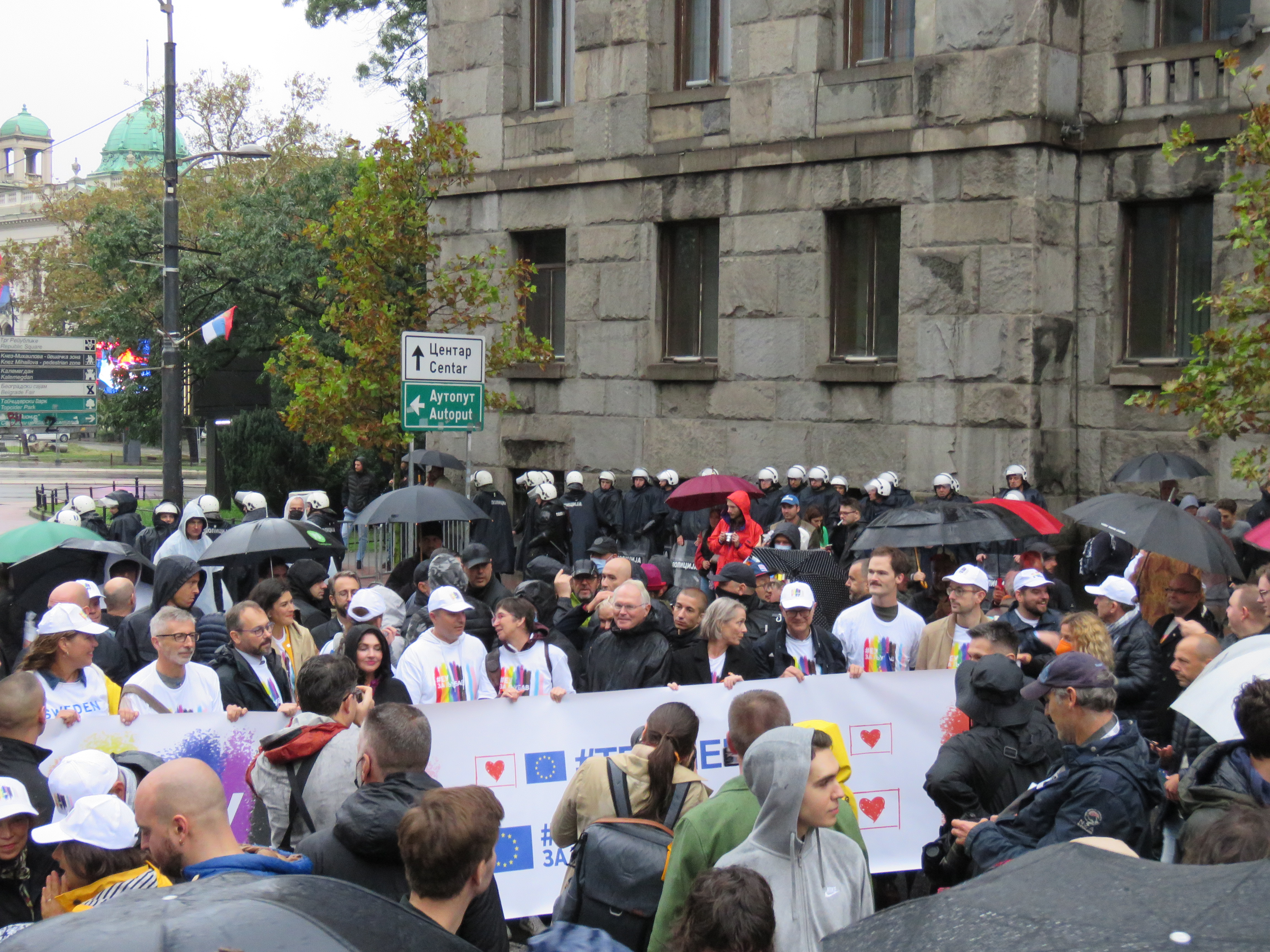
Belgrade Pride hosted EuroPride in 2022

Over the years, public attitude changed with two thirds of participants of the Civil Rights Defenders research explicitly supporting the right to hold a pride parade in Belgrade. At the conference in Bilbao in 2019, Belgrade Pride was selected to host 2022 EuroPride in competition with ILGA Portugal, Dublin Pride and Pride Barcelona. Belgrade became the first city in the region, as well as the first one outside of the European Economic Area, to host the event. On 27 August 2022, President Aleksandar Vučić announced he would not permit EuroPride to go forward, citing current tensions between Serbia and Kosovo, economic problems, and concerns that anti-gay protestors could disrupt the event. Organizers of EuroPride denounced the decision and stated they would go forward with the event anyway. Vučić and the Government of Serbia then ultimately approved on 17 September that the parade could take place. With an estimated 6,000 participants, the 2021 Belgrade Pride became the highest-attended one so far. Minor incidents happened during the parade walk, orchestrated by contra protestors.

== Demands ==
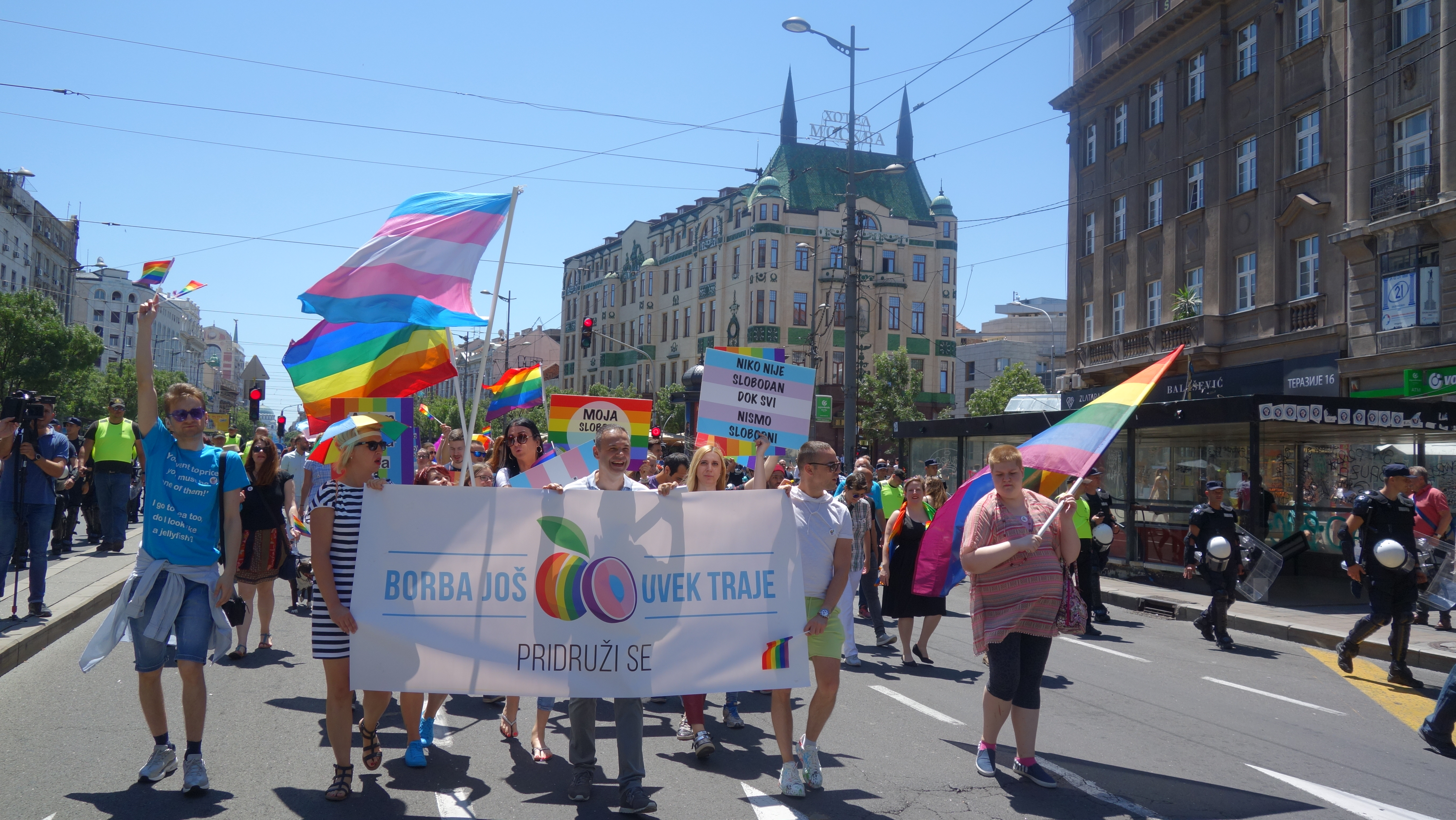
Transgender flag at the Belgrade Pride parade 2019.

Since 2014, Belgrade Pride has had the same demands, which include the following:

- Legalization of same-sex unions
- Introduction of a law on gender identity and the rights for intersex people
- Stronger official responses to hate speech and hate crimes
- Adoption of local action plans for the LGBTQ community in Serbia
- Public apology for Serbian citizens who have been persecuted for their sexuality and gender identity until 1994
- Education on sexual orientation and gender identity
- Free and easily available PrEP and PEP

== Overview ==
#	Date and year	Slogan	Attendance	Pride's Godmother	Queen of the Pride	Ref
1.	June 30, 2001	Ima mesta za sve nas There Is Place For All Of Us		—N/a	—N/a	
2.	October 10, 2010	Možemo zajedno Together We Can	≈ 1,000	—N/a	—N/a	
3.	September 28, 2014	Ponos za sve Pride For Everyone	1,000-1.500	—N/a	—N/a	
4.	September 20, 2015	Moja prava, moji zahtevi My Rights, My Requests	1,000	Biljana Srbljanović	—N/a	
5.	September 18, 2016	Ljubav menja svet Love Changes The World	1,000	Mirjana Karanović	—N/a	
6.	September 17, 2017	Za promenu For Change	1,000	Jelena Karleuša	Alex Elektra	
7.	September 16, 2018	Reci DA! Say YES!	1,500	Suzana Trninić	Dita von Bill	
8.	September 15, 2019	Ne odričem se I'm Not Disowning	2,000	Sara Jo	Ostroga Mi	
9. (Note: Traditional activities were cancelled due to the COVID-19 pandemic.)	September 19, 2020	Solidarni i u četiri zida Solidary Also Between Four Walls	Cancelled			
10.	September 18, 2021	Ljubav je zakon Love Rules	3,000	Nataša Bekvalac	Alexis VanderCut Plastic	
11. (Note: Belgrade Pride hosted the 2022 EuroPride.)	September 17, 2022	Vreme je It's Time	6,000	Sajsi MC	Lana Vee	
12.	September 9, 2023	Nismo ni blizu We Are Not Even Close	4,000	Ida Prester	Hydra GGH	
13.	September 7, 2024	Ponos su ljudi Pride Are People	3,500	Zejna	Sunnoka	
14.	September 6, 2025	Za porodicu For the family	?	?	?	
15.	September 5, 2026	Ima mesta za sve nas There Is Place For All Of Us	2,103	Danica Vučenić	?	

Notes

Belgrade Pride over the years
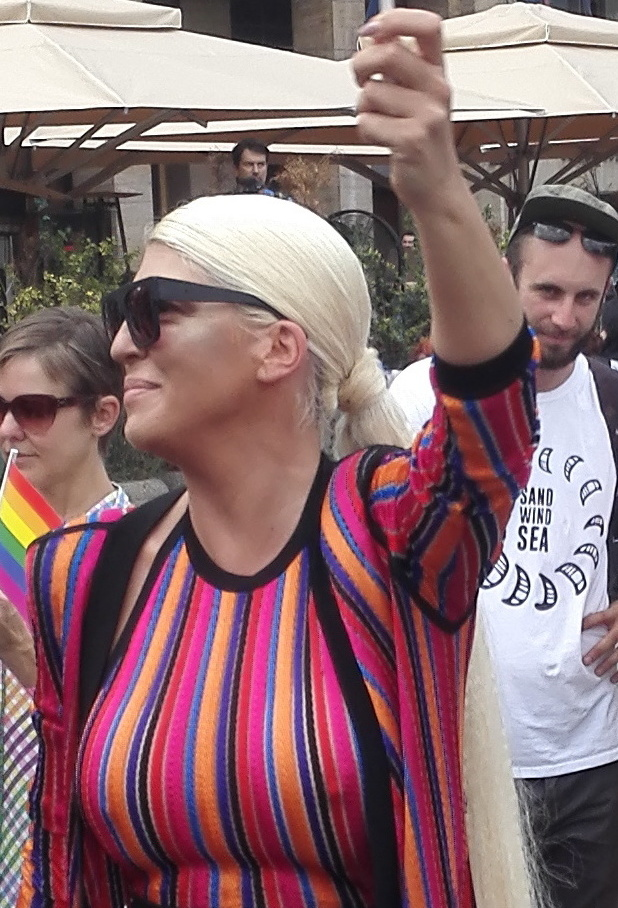
2017 'Pride's Godmother', Jelena Karleuša

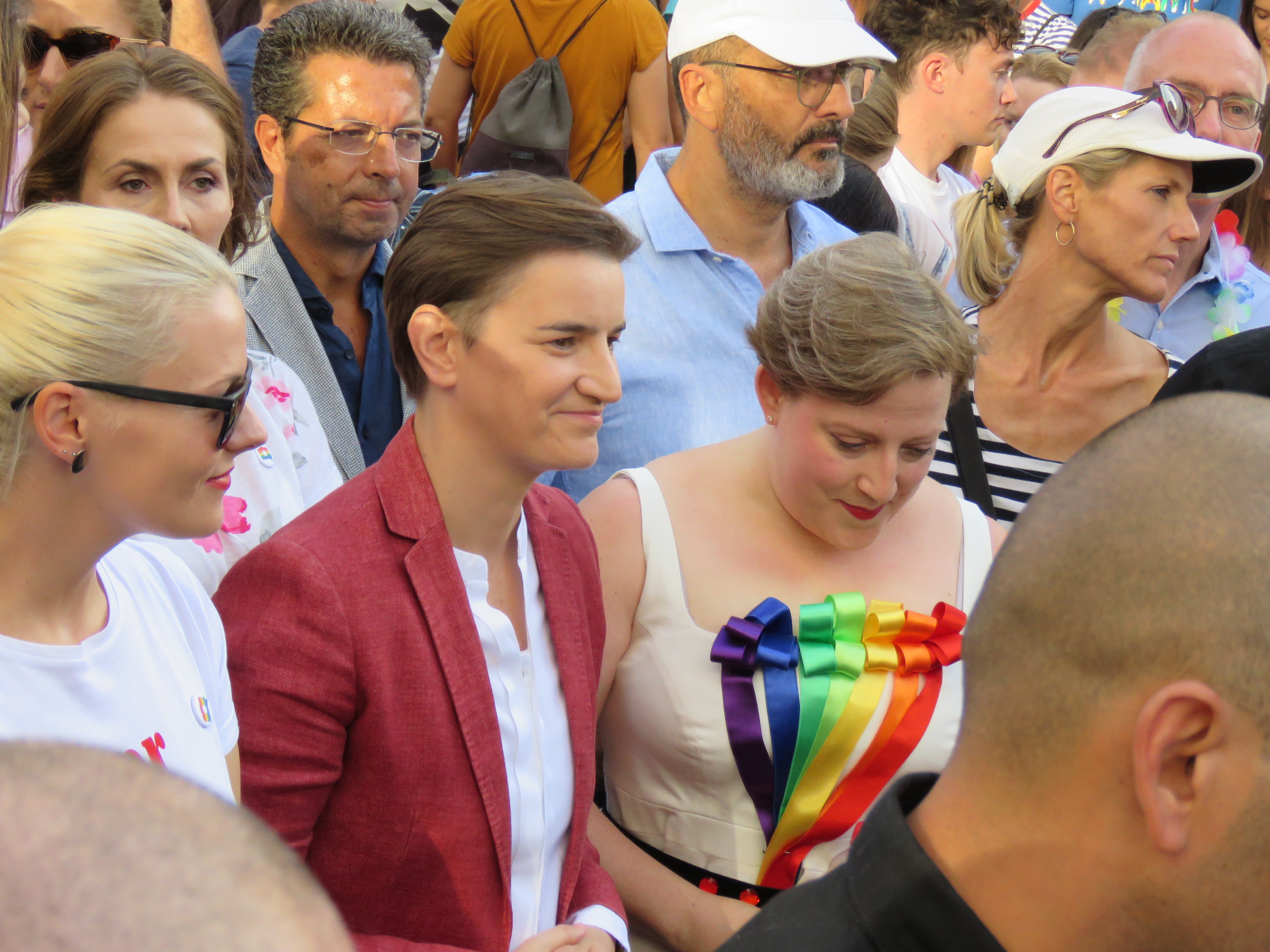
Prime Minister of Serbia, Ana Brnabić, at the 2019 parade

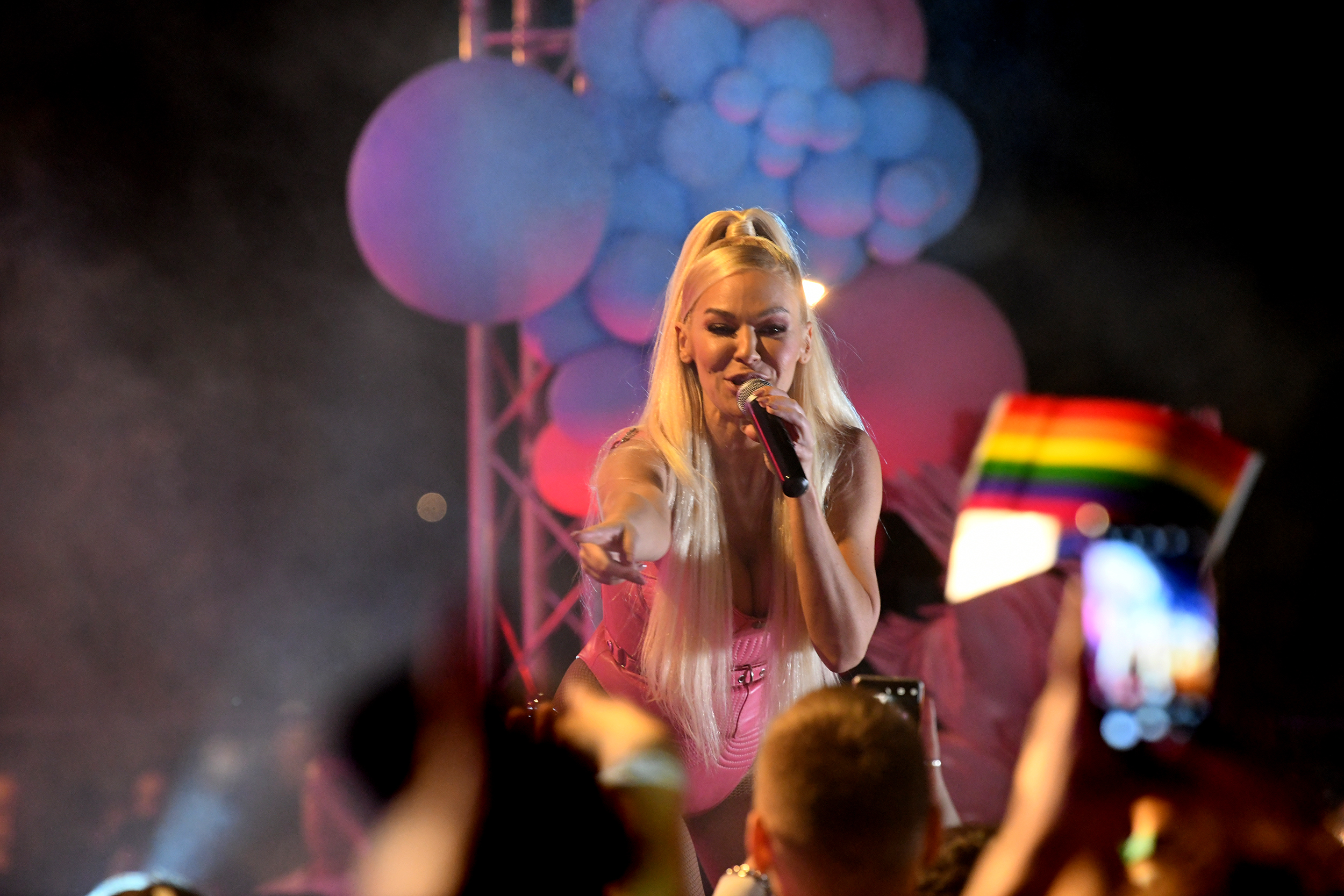
2021 'Pride's Godmother', Nataša Bekvalac

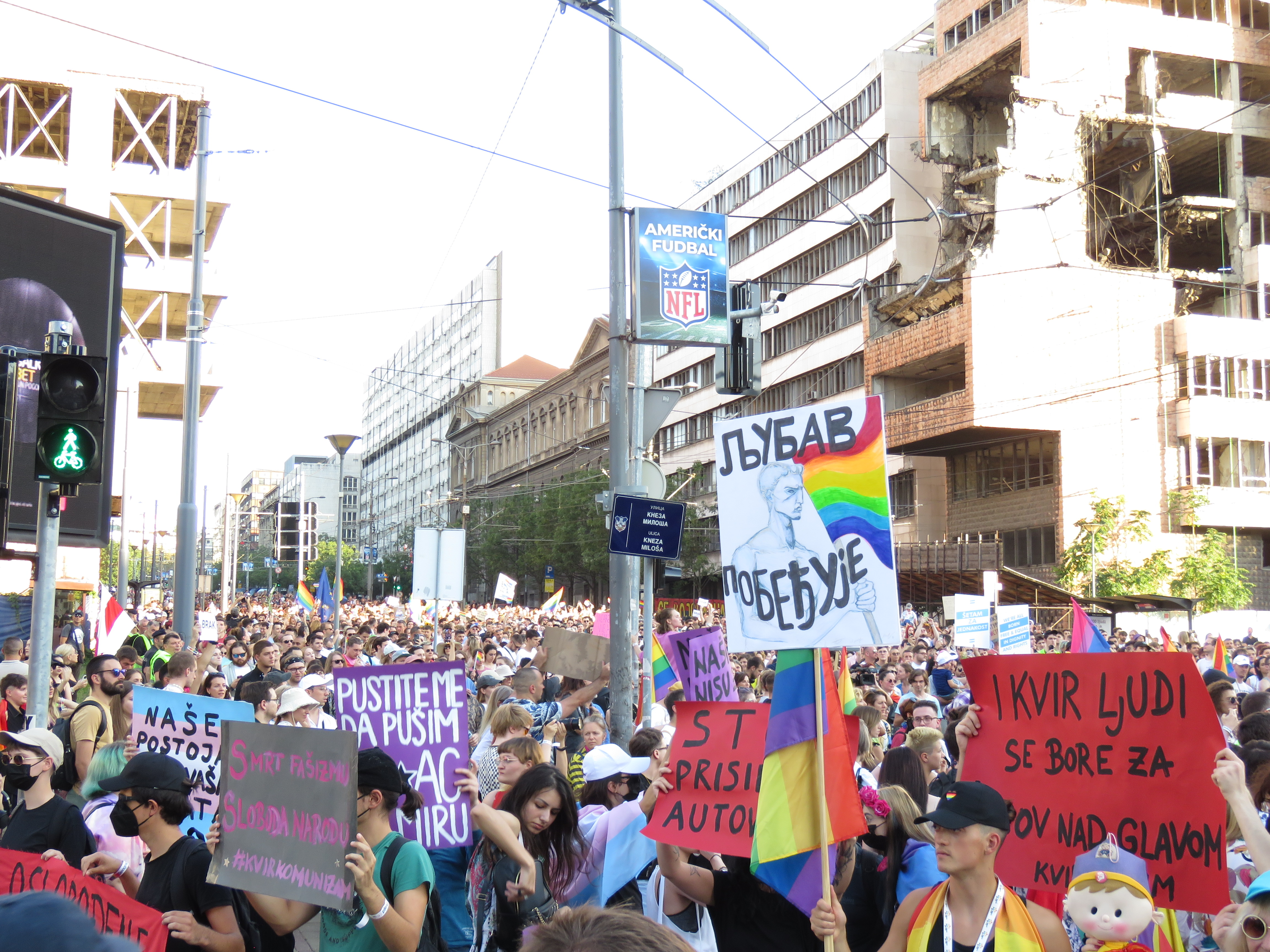
2023 Pride, the highest attended parade so far

== See also ==
- Novi Sad Pride
- LGBT rights in Serbia
- Recognition of same-sex unions in Serbia
- LGBT history in Yugoslavia
- Sarajevo Pride
- Zagreb Pride
