= Novi Sad Pride =

LGBT event in Novi Sad, Serbia

- Native name: Новосадска парада поноса (Serbian)
- Venue: open air & multiple venues
- Location: Novi Sad, Vojvodina, Serbia
- Cause: celebration of the lesbian, gay, bisexual, and transgender (LGBT) people and their allies

Novi Sad Pride (Serbian: Новосадска парада поноса, romanized: Novosadska parada ponosa, Hungarian: Újvidéki büszkeség felvonulás,) is a pride parade held in Novi Sad, second largest city in Serbia and administrative center of Vojvodina, organized to celebrate the lesbian, gay, bisexual, and transgender (LGBT) people and their allies. The event was organized in 2019 for the first time as a part of Novi Sad Pride Week held by the Social Center "Izađi," in cooperation with Belgrade Pride and supported by the City of Novi Sad.

Representatives from the embassies of the United States, the Netherlands, Germany, and the United Kingdom, as well as members of the European Union Mission in Serbia, attended the parade. Novi Sad city officials attended the event as well with Deputy Mayor of Novi Sad Ljiljana Koković stating that although this is a taboo topic in Serbia, significant progress has been made in Novi Sad and that the event will send a message of love and peace and serve as an example for other municipalities.

Attended by around 200 people, 2019 pride was the second ever gay parade in Serbia to be held outside of Belgrade, after Pride week in Niš 2017. The Pride was organized as the end event of the Pride Week in Novi Sad. It was organized on the International Day Against Homophobia, Transphobia and Biphobia.

== History ==
Local organization COME OUT was established in 2010 and it received its official office space in the city as a part of the 2019 Novi Sad European Youth Capital project with an aim to organize the first ever big scale Pride Parade by 2020. However, it was never organized coinciding with the COVID-19 pandemic in Serbia. The 2024 edition of the Novi Sad Pride Week was organized between 13th and 19th May. It was supported by the project "Combating Discrimination and Promoting Diversity in Serbia" part of the joint EU and Council of Europe program "Horizontal Facility for the Western Balkans and Turkey". The slogan of the 2024 week was "We Have Always Been Here".

== See also ==
- LGBT rights in Serbia
- Recognition of same-sex unions in Serbia
- LGBT history in Yugoslavia
- Belgrade Pride
- Osijek Pride
