= LGBTQ rights in North Macedonia =

- Location of North Macedonia (green), with Europe (green + dark grey)
- Legal status: Legal since 1996
- Military: Gays, lesbians and bisexuals allowed to serve
- Discrimination protections: Yes (de jure, unenforced)

Family rights
- Recognition of relationships: No recognition of same-sex relationships

Lesbian, gay, bisexual, transgender and queer (LGBTQ) people in North Macedonia face discrimination and some legal and social challenges not experienced by non-LGBTQ residents. Both male and female same-sex sexual activity have been legal in North Macedonia since 1996, but same-sex couples and households headed by same-sex couples are not eligible for the same legal protections available to opposite-sex married couples.

In 2024, ILGA-Europe ranked North Macedonia 31st out of 48 European countries in terms of LGBT rights legislation.

== Legality of same-sex sexual activity ==
Homosexuality was outlawed in North Macedonia until 1996, when the country decriminalized sex between people of the same sex as a condition for becoming a member of the Council of Europe.

== Recognition of same-sex relationships ==
There is no legal recognition of same-sex couples. The family law defines marriage as "a union between a man and a woman".

In September 2013, a proposed constitutional amendment to define marriage as a union between a man and a woman failed to meet the required two-thirds majority in the Assembly of North Macedonia. In late June 2014, the re-elected main party once again submitted the bill, this time hoping that the conservative opposition party, the Democratic Party of Albanians (DPA), would provide the additional votes needed to pass.

In January 2015, Parliament voted in favour to constitutionally define marriage as a union solely between a man and a woman. In addition, politicians adopted an amendment to ensure that a two-thirds majority would be necessary to regulate marriage, family and civil unions. Such a majority was previously reserved only for issues such as sovereignty and territorial questions. On 9 January, the parliamentary committee on constitutional issues approved a series of amendments, including the limitation of marriage and the two-thirds majority requirement which was included at the last minute. On 20 January, the amendments were approved in Parliament by 72 votes to 4. In order for these amendments to be added to the Constitution, a final vote was required. This final parliamentary session was commenced on 26 January but never concluded, as the ruling coalition did not obtain the two-thirds majority required. The parliamentary session on the constitutional amendments was in recess until the end of 2015, thus the amendment failed.

== Discrimination protections ==
From 2008 to 2010, LGBTQ individuals were protected from discrimination in the area of employment. In the beginning of 2010, however, while revising the anti-discrimination law, the country's Parliament removed sexual orientation from the list of protected grounds.

In March 2019, with 52 votes in favour and three abstentions, the Parliament adopted a new anti-discrimination law that includes sexual orientation and gender identity, among other grounds. On 22 May, the Law on Prevention of and Protection against Discrimination (Macedonian: Закон за спречување и заштита од дискриминација; Albanian: Ligji për parandalimin dhe mbrojtjen nga diskriminimi) came into effect, after newly elected President Stevo Pendarovski had signed it into law. On 14 May 2020, the Constitutional Court struck down the law on procedural grounds. A similar bill was passed by the Parliament on 27 October 2020.

== Gender identity and expression ==
In January 2019, the European Court of Human Rights (ECHR) ruled that North Macedonia's requirement that transgender people undergo sex reassignment surgery before their gender marker on ID documents can be changed is a violation of human rights. The judgment held that deficiencies in North Macedonia's laws concerning modifying gender on official identification documents infringed the private life of transgender Macedonians.

== Living conditions ==
The gay scene in North Macedonia is very small. There are a few gay-friendly establishments in Skopje and some bars organize "gay nights". The country itself is mainly socially conservative towards homosexuality. There are many reports about public humiliations, worker firings and even casting homosexual teenagers onto the streets due to revelation of their sexual orientations.

In 2019, North Macedonia was ranked the tenth worst European country for LGBTQ tourists.

On 29 June 2019, an estimated 1,000 people participated in the first Skopje Pride. Some state officials joined the march, including Defense Minister Radmila Šekerinska and Labor and Social Issues Minister Mila Carovska. Several foreign diplomats also attended the march.

In June 2023, Strumica Municipality mayor Kostadin Kostadinov announced the nullification of all memorandums signed with LGBTQ organizations and that any future such memorandums will be vetoed.

=== Public opinion ===
A survey carried out in 2002 by the Center for Civil and Human Rights showed that more than 80% of the people saw homosexuality as "a psychiatric disorder that endangered families". About 65% answered that "being gay is a crime that warranted a jail term."

Women are generally more liberal in their attitudes towards homosexuality than men and rural inhabitants.

=== LGBTQ rights organizations ===
There are three main organizations and a support center working in the area of LGBTQ rights:

- LGBT United (Macedonian: ЛГБТ Јунајтед; Albanian: Të bashkuar LGBT) is a recently formed organization which works exclusively for protecting LGBT rights in the country. It organized the first ever pride week in Skopje in late June 2013 alongside the Coalition "Sexual and Health Rights of Marginalized Communities". The programme mainly included the airing of LGBT-themed films.
- EGAL (Macedonian: ЕГАЛ) is the oldest organization working in the area of gay/lesbian health issues. It's also one of the main supporters of the Dzunitsa film festival, which shows LGBTQ-themed films.
- Coalition "Sexual and Health Rights of Marginalized Communities" (Macedonian: Коалиција „Сексуални и здравствени права на маргинализираните заедници“; Albanian: Koalicionin ”Të drejtat seksuale dhe shëndetësore të komuniteteve të margjinalizuara") works partially in the LGBT rights area and organizes different events for promoting equality. It worked on organizing the Skopje Pride Week in 2013.
- LGBTI Support Center (Macedonian: ЛГБТИ Центар за поддршка; Albanian: Qendra mbështetëse për LGBTI) is a subsidiary of the Helsinki Committee for Human Rights of the Republic of Macedonia located in Skopje that works on changing the legal and social status of the LGBTQ people in North Macedonia through community strengthening, advocacy and free legal aid.

=== Country Reports on Human Rights Practices for 2019 ===
According to United States' Country Reports on Human Rights Practices for North Macedonia in 2019, the LGBTQ community is still prejudiced and harassed by the society, media and the authorities despite increasing tolerance. The constitution and law prohibit discrimination based on sexual orientation in housing, employment, nationality laws, and access to government services such as health care, and the government enforced such laws. The report stated:

The LGBTI community remained marginalized, and activists supporting LGBTI rights reported incidents of societal prejudice, including hate speech. The CSO Coalition Margini documented 70 cases of violence against LGBTI individuals, five cases of discrimination, and one case of verbal assault by a police officer during the year. In one case fellow students verbally and physically attacked an LGBTI high school student, resulting in a broken nose. The student reported the case to the principal but chose not to report it to the police. Additionally, Margini noted most cases of violence against LGBTI persons are not reported to police or other institutions. According to the coalition, the Skopje public prosecutor remained ineffective in processing pending cases involving hate speech targeting members of the LGBTI community. On January 17, the European Court of Human Rights (ECHR) found the country violated the privacy rights, as well as the right to appeal, of a transgender person related to the gender change procedure. The court required the government to pay €9,000 ($9,900) in damages to the unnamed applicant. Despite the court ruling, NGOs complained the government failed to recognize gender identity changes in identification documents.

On June 29, the day of the country’s first ever pride parade, approximately 20 persons attacked prominent LGBTI activist Bekim Asani in Skopje. The aggressors chased Asani and six other LGBTI activists down the street, pulled them out of a taxi, beat Asani, and threatened to kill him and the other activists. Police arrested the assailants and opened a criminal investigation.

CSOs noted deficiencies and improved the legislative framework to protect the LGBTI community from discrimination. The Law on Primary Education, adopted in July, introduced antidiscrimination language related to sexual orientation and gender identity. The Law on Prevention and Protection from Discrimination, adopted in May, explicitly forbids discrimination based on sexual orientation and gender identity in all areas. Amendments to the Criminal Code specifically list sexual orientation and gender identity in the section regulating hate speech.

The first Pride Parade took place in June. Police ensured the safety of approximately 2,000 participants that included members of parliament and government ministers. The parade triggered some hate speech on social media.

Unlike the previous years, the 2025 Pride Parade featured heavy socialist, pro-palestinian, and anti-fascist sentiment, featuring multiple socialist organizations, however due to organizers declaring it a protest, foreign embassies pulled funding which decreased the number of attendees.

== Summary table ==
Same-sex sexual activity legal	Yes (Since 1996)
Equal age of consent (14)	Yes (Since 1996)
Anti-discrimination laws in employment only	Yes (de jure, since 2020)
Anti-discrimination laws in the provision of goods and services	Yes (de jure, since 2020)
Anti-discrimination laws in all other areas (incl. indirect discrimination, hate speech)	Yes (de jure, since 2020)
Anti-discrimination laws concerning gender identity	Yes (de jure, since 2020)
Same-sex marriage	No
Recognition of same-sex couples	No
Stepchild adoption by same-sex couples	No
Joint adoption by same-sex couples	No
Gays, lesbians and bisexuals allowed to serve openly in the military	Yes
Right to change legal gender	Yes (de facto since 2021)
Access to IVF for lesbians	No
Commercial surrogacy for gay male couples	No
MSMs allowed to donate blood	No

== See also ==
- Human rights in North Macedonia
- Recognition of same-sex unions in North Macedonia
- LGBTQ rights in Europe
- LGBTQ history in Yugoslavia
