= Recognition of same-sex unions in North Macedonia =

North Macedonia does not recognize same-sex marriages or civil unions. A constitutional amendment to ban same-sex marriage failed in 2015.

== Civil unions ==
North Macedonia does not recognize civil unions (Macedonian: граѓанско партнерство, graǵansko partnerstvo, pronounced [ˈɡraɟanskɔ ˈpartnɛrstvɔ]; Albanian: bashkim civil, pronounced [baʃˈkim tsiˈvil]) (Note: In North Macedonia's national minority languages: Aromanian: uniuniljei tsivili; Bosnian: životno partnerstvo, животно партнерство, pronounced [ʒǐvotno pârtnerstvo]; Romani: registrime partneripe; Serbian: животно партнерство, životno partnerstvo, pronounced [ʒǐvotno pârtnerstvo]; Turkish: medeni birliktelik, pronounced [medeˈni biɾlicteˈlic]) which would offer same-sex couples some of the rights, benefits and responsibilities of marriage. As a member of the Council of Europe, North Macedonia falls under the jurisdiction of the European Court of Human Rights (ECHR). In January 2023, the Grand Chamber of the European Court of Human Rights ruled in Fedotova and Others v. Russia that Article 8 of the European Convention on Human Rights, which guarantees a right to private and family life, imposes a positive obligation on all member states of the Council of Europe to establish a legal framework recognising same-sex unions.

== Same-sex marriage ==
Laws regarding same-sex partnerships in Europe¹ Marriage Civil union Limited domestic recognition (cohabitation) Unrecognized Constitution limits marriage to opposite-sex couples ¹ May include recent laws or court decisions that have not yet entered into effect.

=== Background ===
There is no legal recognition of same-sex relationships in North Macedonia. The Law on Family (Macedonian: Закон за семејството, Zakon za semejstvoto; Albanian: Ligji për familjen) defines marriage as "a living community of a man and a woman regulated by law." Article 15 of the Law on Family also states that "a marriage may be stipulated by two persons of different gender with a freely expressed will before a competent authority, in a manner stipulated by this law."

=== Attempts to pass constitutional ban ===
The Constitution of North Macedonia does not expressly prohibit same-sex marriages. Article 40 states:

The legal relations in marriage, the family and cohabitation are regulated by law. (Note: In the official languages of North Macedonia: Macedonian: Правните односи во бракот, семејството и вонбрачната заедница се уредуваат со закон.; Albanian: Marrëdhëniet juridike në martesë, familje dhe bashkësinë jashtëmartesore rregullohen me ligj.)

In September 2013, a proposed constitutional amendment to define marriage as a union between "a man and a woman" failed to meet the required two-thirds majority in the Assembly of North Macedonia. In late June 2014, the re-elected ruling party, VMRO-DPMNE, once again submitted a bill, this time hoping that the Democratic Party of Albanians (DPA) would provide the additional votes needed to pass it. On 9 January 2015, the parliamentary committee on constitutional issues approved the amendment prohibiting same-sex marriage. On 20 January, the amendment was approved in Parliament by 72 votes to 4. "Today's vote is another addition to discrimination, violence and intolerance on the basis of sexual orientation or gender identity in North Macedonia", said a spokesman for Amnesty International in response. A final vote was required for the amendment to be added to the Constitution. This final parliamentary session was commenced on 26 January but never concluded, as the ruling coalition did not obtain the two-thirds majority required. Eventually, the amendment failed, and the Constitution was not modified to prohibit same-sex marriages. Activist Antonio Mihajlov criticized the proposed amendment, telling 24Vesti that "gay marriages are often used for political discussions, as a topic to gain political points and to draw attention from important topics such as corruption, unemployment and crime".

== Public opinion ==
A 2015 National Democratic Institute (NDI) poll showed that 2% of Macedonians considered same-sex marriages "completely acceptable" and 7% considered it "mainly acceptable", while 89% of respondents considered it "unacceptable" (11% "mainly unacceptable" and 78% "completely unacceptable"). A December 2022 Ipsos survey showed that 20% of Macedonians considered same-sex marriage "acceptable" (10% "completely" and 10% "mainly"), while 78% considered it "unacceptable" (69% "completely" and 9% "mainly"). With regard to specific rights, 49% of respondents supported the right of same-sex couples to receive survivor pension benefits in case of the partner's death.

== See also ==
- LGBT rights in North Macedonia
- Recognition of same-sex unions in Europe
