= Đojleni =

History of Balkan, Serbia and Ottomans

Đojleni (also adžuvani) was a term used in the first half of the 19th century for young men associated with Ottoman officials in Belgrade, including young men documented as having served as their paid lovers. The phenomenon was recorded during the period of the gradual political autonomy of the Principality of Serbia from the Ottoman Empire.

Historian, sociologist and lawyer Ivan Janković, who researched prostitution and sexuality in Belgrade during the first half of the 19th century on the basis of archival sources, states that wealthier and more prominent Ottomans kept Serbian young men known as adžuvani or đojleni, who served them in exchange for money.

== Name and meaning ==
The word adžuvan is also recorded in Abdulah Škaljić's 1966 work Turcizmi u srpskohrvatskom jeziku ("Turkisms in the Serbo-Croatian Language"), where it is defined as meaning "young man" and "lover".

Janković interprets the term đojle as meaning "favorite", referring to a person who was especially dear to someone. In the documents he examined, various terms appear for expenses related to their maintenance, including "djeci", "đojlenima", "daire djeci" and "đojle-egbi".

== The Vizier of Belgrade and the đojleni ==
According to Janković, the Vizier of Belgrade maintained a number of đojleni, who were looked after by a special official whose position was comparable to that of other senior members of the vizier's household. The costs of their maintenance were recorded among the expenses associated with the vizier and his entourage.

In an interview with Radio Free Europe/Radio Liberty, Janković described this group as the vizier's "male harem" and stated that the existence of such relationships in Belgrade at the time was not necessarily concealed, although homosexual relations among the Christian population were socially and legally stigmatized.

According to a document cited by Janković, Prince Miloš Obrenović once reproached the then Vizier of Belgrade, Husein Pasha, for spending his nights drinking and entertaining himself with his adžuvani. The term also appears in an insulting letter addressed to Vuk Karadžić, in which a man named Kosta is mentioned as allegedly having been an adžuvan of the Belgrade pasha's son.

== Documented cases ==
Janković cites several archival documents indicating sexual relations between young men and Ottoman residents of Belgrade. In 1829, a widow from Zemun asked the authorities to return her son Jovan, whom she had previously sent to Belgrade to learn a trade. She stated that her son was spending both days and nights with Turks and possessed a considerable amount of money that he had not received from his family, leading her to suspect that he was involved in a sexual relationship.

In 1842, Đorđe Lazarević from Smederevo was accused of coming to Belgrade without a passport, associating with Turks and, according to the wording of the contemporary document, engaging in "sodomitic fornication" (sodomsko bludosmešenije).

The weekly magazine Vreme also discussed these practices in a 2014 review of Janković's book, describing an adžuvan or đojlen as a "male favorite" and noting that the role involved an element of prostitution.

== Distinction from other terms ==
Đojleni and adžuvani should not be confused with adumi or adumci, meaning eunuchs, who were also part of Ottoman households and harems. Janković notes that expenses for eunuchs were recorded separately in contemporary accounts.

The đojleni were also distinct from köçeks (Turkish: köçek), young male dancers who performed in women's clothing in taverns and at celebrations throughout the Ottoman Empire. Although köçek performances often had a homoerotic element, they represented a separate social and professional phenomenon.

== See also ==
- LGBT history
- LGBT history in Serbia
- Köçek
- Prostitution in the Ottoman Empire
