= LGBTQ rights in Montenegro =

- Location of Montenegro (green) in Europe (dark grey) – [Legend]
- Legal status: Legal since 1977; age of consent equalized in 1977
- Gender identity: Transgender people allowed to change gender
- Military: Gays, lesbians and bisexuals are allowed to serve
- Discrimination protections: Sexual orientation and gender identity protections (see below)

Family rights
- Recognition of relationships: Life partnership since 2021
- Restrictions: Same-sex marriage banned by the Constitution since 2007
- Adoption: No

Lesbian, gay, bisexual, and transgender (LGBT) people in Montenegro face significant challenges not experienced by non-LGBT residents. Both male and female same-sex sexual activity are legal in Montenegro, but households headed by same-sex couples are not eligible for the same legal protections available to opposite-sex married couples.

Same-sex couples are unable to marry, and the Constitution of Montenegro bans same-sex marriage. Since 15 July 2021, same-sex couples may register their relationship as a Life Partnership, which gives them almost the same legal rights and protections available to opposite-sex married couples, except adoption.

Discrimination on the basis of both sexual orientation and gender identity is banned in employment, the provision of goods and services, education and health services. Montenegro also possesses hate crime and hate speech laws which include sexual orientation and gender identity as grounds of non-discrimination. The ILGA-Europe association has ranked Montenegro 8th out of 49 European countries in terms of LGBT rights legislation. Despite this, Montenegrin society has yet to reach a high level of acceptance, and discrimination against LGBT people often goes unreported.

== Legality of same-sex sexual activity ==
Montenegro decriminalised same-sex sexual activity in 1977. The age of consent (14) was also equalised in 1977.

== Recognition of same-sex relationships ==
Laws regarding same-sex partnerships in Europe¹ Marriage Civil union Limited domestic recognition (cohabitation) Unrecognized Constitution limits marriage to opposite-sex couples ¹ May include recent laws or court decisions that have not yet entered into effect.

The Constitution of Montenegro bans same-sex marriage.

On 13 November 2012, then Deputy Prime Minister Duško Marković stated that the Montenegrin Government would prepare a bill giving some form of legal recognition to same-sex couples. The Human and Minority Rights Ministry drafted a bill to legalise registered partnerships, which would confer some of the rights, benefits and responsibilities of marriage but would not include adoption or fostering rights. The Serbian Orthodox Church and the Democratic Front came out in opposition to the proposal, claiming it would "wreck" Christian values and family life in Montenegro. On 27 December 2018, the Government of Montenegro accepted the draft. If enacted, it would have taken effect one year later. The bill was lodged in the Parliament on 24 January. On 27 February 2019, it was backed by the parliamentary committee on human rights. However, on 31 July 2019 the bill was blocked by parliamentarians, led by the Democratic Front, in a 38–4 vote and 39 abstentions. The necessary majority of 41 votes was not achieved. The Democratic Party of Socialists, the Social Democrats and the Liberal Party supported the measure.

On 12 December 2019, the Government approved the second, similar draft of the bill. It was introduced to the parliament on 14 January 2020. On 18 June 2020, the bill was backed by the parliamentary committee on human rights. On 1 July 2020, the bill was approved by the Parliament, in a 42–5 vote and 34 abstentions. The bill was supported by the Democratic Party of Socialists, Social Democrats, Social Democratic Party (except for one deputy), Liberal Party and one deputy from DEMOS. It was opposed by the opposition, as well as three parties representing ethnic minority communities (Croats, Bosniaks, and Albanians). The bill was signed into law on 3 July 2020 by President Milo Đukanović. The law was published on 7 July 2020 in the Official Gazette of Montenegro. It would enter into force on the eighth day from the day of its publication and applied from one year thereafter.

== Discrimination protections ==
On 27 July 2010, the Montenegrin Parliament passed a non-discrimination law that includes sexual orientation and gender identity as prohibited grounds of discrimination. This was one of the requirements the country had to meet for European Union membership. The legislation, known as the Law on Prohibition of Discrimination (Montenegrin: Zakon o zabrani diskriminacije), defines "discrimination" as follows:

Discrimination is any unjustified, legal or actual, direct or indirect distinction or unequal treatment, or failure to treat a person or a group of persons in comparison to other persons, as well as exclusion, restriction or preferential treatment of a person in comparison to other persons, based on race, colour of skin, national affiliation, social or ethnic origin, affiliation to the minority nation or minority national community, language, religion or belief, political or other opinion, gender, gender identity, sexual orientation, health conditions, disability, age, material status, marital or family status, membership in a group or assumed membership in a group, political party or other organisation as well as other personal characteristics.

In 2013, the Criminal Code was amended to prohibit hate speech on the basis of both sexual orientation and gender identity, and to provide penalty enhancements if a crime is committed based on the victim's LGBT status. These changes came into force on 3 June 2014.

== Military service ==
Gays, lesbians and bisexuals are not banned from military service.

== Gender identity and expression ==
Transgender people in Montenegro are allowed to change legal gender, but require undergoing sex reassignment surgery, sterilisation, divorce if married and receiving a medical diagnosis to do so.

== Social conditions ==
Gays and lesbians may face discrimination and harassment in Montenegro. Anti-gay attitudes are deeply ingrained in society and there is widespread opposition to LGBT rights. In 2020, Balkan Insight noted that despite the passage of the civil partnerships bill, previous polling had suggested that 71% of Montenegro's citizens considered homosexuality to be an "illness", and about half thought it was a danger to society that should be suppressed by the state.

=== LGBT activism ===
The first Gay Pride event in Montenegro was held on 24 July 2013 in the coastal town of Budva, organized by the NGO "LGBT Forum Progres", and it subsequently caused various reactions in public. On 20 October 2013, a Pride event took place in the capital city of Podgorica, where violent anti-gay protesters were arrested by police.

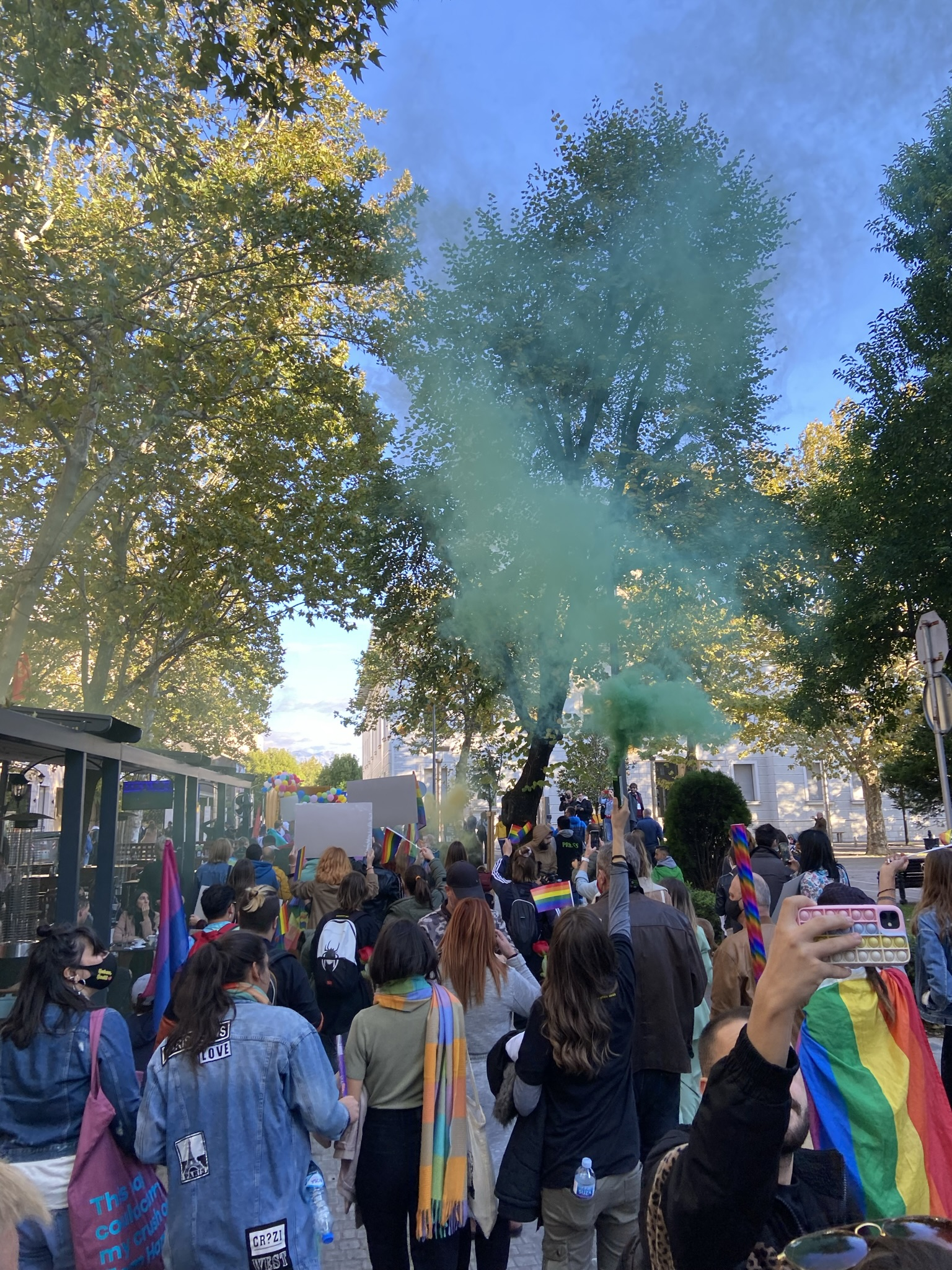
LGBT rights activists at Podgorica Pride in 2021.

In September 2017, the fifth annual Podgorica Gay Pride parade took place without any recorded incident. It was organized by the NGO "Queer Montenegro", and was attended by about 200 people.

== Summary table ==
Same-sex sexual activity legal	Yes (Since 1977)
Equal age of consent (14)	Yes (Since 1977)
Anti-discrimination laws in employment	Yes (Since 2010)
Anti-discrimination laws in the provision of goods and services	Yes (Since 2010)
Anti-discrimination laws in all other areas	Yes (Since 2010)
Hate crime laws include sexual orientation and gender identity	Yes (Since 2014)
Same-sex marriage	No (Constitutional ban since 2007)
Recognition of same-sex couples	Yes (Since 2021)
Stepchild adoption by same-sex couples	No
Joint adoption by same-sex couples	No
Lesbians, gays and bisexuals allowed to serve in the military	Yes
Right to change legal gender	Yes (Requires surgery)
Access to IVF for lesbians	No
Conversion therapy banned	No
Commercial surrogacy for gay male couples	No (Banned regardless of sexual orientation)
MSMs allowed to donate blood	Yes

== See also ==
- LGBT rights in Europe
- LGBT history in Yugoslavia
