= LGBTQ rights in Serbia =

- Location of Serbia (green) – Kosovo (light green) on the European continent (dark grey)
- Legal status: Legal nationwide since 1994, age of consent equalized in 2006
- Gender identity: Transgender people allowed to change legal gender without any surgery, but after at least 1 year of hormone replacement therapy
- Military: Lesbians, gays and bisexuals allowed to serve openly
- Discrimination protections: Sexual orientation, gender identity and sex characteristics protections (see below)

Family rights
- Recognition of relationships: No recognition of same-sex relationships
- Restrictions: Same-sex marriage constitutionally banned
- Adoption: Same-sex couples not allowed to adopt

LGBT variant of the flag of Serbia.

Lesbian, gay, bisexual, transgender, and queer (LGBTQ) people in Serbia face significant challenges not experienced by non-LGBTQ residents. Both male and female same-sex sexual activity are legal in Serbia, and discrimination on the basis of sexual orientation is banned in areas such as employment, education, media, and the provision of goods and services, amongst others. Nevertheless, households headed by same-sex couples are not eligible for the same legal protections available to opposite-sex couples.

In May 2014, Amnesty International identified Serbia as one of a number of countries where there is a marked lack of will to tackle homophobia and transphobia, noting that public authorities had repeatedly banned pride parades on the basis of violent threats from homophobic groups. They had also failed to protect LGBTQ individuals and organizations from discrimination, including verbal and social media threats and physical attacks. The Belgrade Pride successfully took place in September 2014 in Belgrade. Since then, pride parades have been held annually (except in 2020, when the event was held online due to the COVID-19 pandemic), with local mayors and some government ministers regularly attending. In its 2026 Rainbow Map, the association ILGA-Europe ranked Serbia 29th out of 49 observed European countries with a score of 34%, a decline from 27th in 2024.

In June 2017, Ana Brnabić became the prime minister of Serbia, as the first woman and first openly lesbian person to hold the office, and the second female LGBTQ head of government overall (after Jóhanna Sigurðardóttir of Iceland). She was also the first Serbian prime minister to attend a pride parade. On 20 March 2024, she was elected president of the National Assembly of Serbia, leaving her prime minister position.

== Law regarding same-sex sexual activity ==
=== Revolutionary Serbia (1804–1813) ===
Although religious laws existed prohibiting same-sex love and relationships, expressions were common in both Orthodox Christian and Islamic society. One expression of same-sex bonds among Orthodox Christians were brotherhood unions known as "Pobratimstvo" (Adelphopoiesis), although the sexual character of these unions is debated among scholars. The early nineteenth century saw a time of relative turmoil for Serbia, with sporadic periods of stability. In 1804, the First Serbian Uprising established a de facto self-governing revolutionary state in Serbia, which lasted until the Ottoman Empire re-established control in 1813; full Ottoman-recognised autonomy of the Principality of Serbia came later, in 1830. Karađorđe's Criminal Code (Карађорђев криминални законик, Karađorđev kriminalni zakonik) was subsequently promulgated by the Serbian Jurisprudential Council sometime in late spring or early summer 1807, and remained in force until 7 October 1813, when the Ottoman Empire re-gained control of Serbia. The Code penalised certain issues related to marital life and sexuality (such as forced marriage, rape, separation/divorce without the approval of a clerical court, and infanticide). It did not, however, mention same-sex sexual activity; and so homosexuality was not criminalised for a period of six years.

=== Principality of Serbia (1815–1882) ===
In 1858, the Ottoman Empire, of which Serbia was nominally a vassal, removed sodomy provisions from its penal code, although some scholars dispute the framing of this as a clear "decriminalization".

However, the progressive reforms introduced by Prince Alexander Karađorđević and Prince Mihailo were overturned when Miloš Obrenović returned to power. In the first post-medieval Criminal Code of the Principality of Serbia, named "Kaznitelni zakon" (Penalty Act), adopted in 1860, sexual intercourse "against the order of nature" between males became punishable by from 6 months' to 4 years' imprisonment. Like in many other countries' legal documents of the time, lesbian sexuality was ignored and not mentioned.

==== Kingdom of Yugoslavia (1918–1941) ====
In 1918, Serbia became a part of the Kingdom of Serbs, Croats and Slovenes (renamed the Kingdom of Yugoslavia in 1929). At first, the new state effectively inherited the different laws that applied to the different territories that joined together (often contradictory). Eventually, the new Yugoslav Criminal Code of 1929 banned "lewdness against the order of nature" (anal intercourse) between both heterosexuals and homosexuals.

=== SFR Yugoslavia (1945–1992) ===
The Socialist Federal Republic of Yugoslavia restricted the offence in 1959 to only apply to homosexual anal intercourse, and the maximum sentence was reduced from 2 to 1 year's imprisonment.

In 1977, same-sex sexual intercourse was legalized in the Socialist Autonomous Province of Vojvodina, while male same-sex sexual intercourse remained illegal in the rest of the Socialist Republic of Serbia (including the Socialist Autonomous Province of Kosovo). In 1990, Vojvodina was reincorporated into the legal system of Serbia, and male homosexuality once again become a criminal offence.

=== FR Yugoslavia / Serbia and Montenegro (1992–2006) ===
In 1994, male homosexual sexual intercourse was officially decriminalised in the Republic of Serbia, a part of the Federal Republic of Yugoslavia, though amendment of subsection 1 of article 110 (act against order of nature) of the then Criminal Code, which effectively restrained the offence to only acts done under force or coercion. At the same time, subsection 4, which set a ban on male same-sex acts for men ages 14 to 18, with a prison sentence of up to one year, was added. Thus, the age of consent was set at 18 years for anal intercourse between males and 14 for other sexual practices. An equal age of consent of 14 was introduced on 1 January 2006 with the current Criminal Code, regardless of sexual orientation or gender.

== Recognition of same-sex relationships ==
While same-sex couples have never been recognized by law, the new Serbian Constitution adopted in November 2006 effectively bans same-sex marriage: Article 62 provides that marriage is entered into based on the free consent of a man and a woman. However, other forms of recognition, such as civil unions or domestic partnerships, are not explicitly mentioned nor prohibited.

In June 2019, plans were announced to legalise domestic partnerships between same-sex couples by amending the Civil Code. Same-sex couples would be able to enjoy several legal rights, including joint property and alimony. They would not be granted inheritance or adoption rights, nor undergo surrogacy arrangements. In July 2019, a lesbian couple, Jelena Dubović and Sunčica Kopunović, from the northern city of Novi Sad, attempted to register a civil partnership at the municipal registrar's office, but were turned away. They filed a lawsuit, though legal experts believe it is unlikely that they will win the case.

In November 2020, Minister for Human and Minority Rights and Social Dialogue Gordana Čomić announced that the Law on same-sex partnerships would be in parliament in the first half of 2021. The draft law was presented for public consultation in February 2021. In May 2021, however, President Aleksandar Vučić stated that he would not sign the bill, claiming it was unconstitutional, and the legislation subsequently stalled without ever being put to a parliamentary vote. In August 2023, Vučić reaffirmed that he would not sign any same-sex unions law during his term.

In September 2024, opposition members of the Green–Left Front submitted a new Draft Law on Civil Partnership to the National Assembly, covering rights such as maintenance, inheritance and health and social insurance; as of 2026 it had not been scheduled for a vote. The matter is also affected by the 2023 European Court of Human Rights Grand Chamber ruling in Fedotova and Others v. Russia, which held that Council of Europe member states (including Serbia) have a positive obligation to provide some form of legal recognition for same-sex couples.

== Adoption and parenting ==
Same-sex couples cannot legally adopt. In early 2019, the Serbian Ministry of Health imposed a ban on those with a "history of homosexual relations during the last five years" from donating reproductive cells for artificial insemination or in vitro fertilisation. The Ministry of Health removed the provision on 23 April 2021.

== Discrimination protections ==
Until 2002, Serbia had no legal protections specifically aimed at LGBTQ rights.

In 2002, the National Assembly approved the Broadcasting Act (Serbian: Закон о радиодифузији, Zakon o radiodifuziji) which prohibits Serbian broadcasting agencies from spreading information encouraging discrimination, hate and violence based on sexual orientation (among other categories).

In 2005, through a change in the Labor Act (Serbian: Закон о раду, Zakon o radu), discrimination based on sexual orientation in employment was banned. That same year, Parliament approved the Act on Higher Education (Serbian: Закон о високом образовању, Zakon o visokom obrazovanju), which guarantees equal rights regardless of sexual orientation in those institutions (among other categories).

On 26 March 2009, Parliament approved a unified anti-discrimination law, known as the Anti-Discrimination Act of 2009 (Serbian: закон о забрани дискриминације, Zakon o zabrani diskiminacije), which prohibits, among other categories, discrimination on the basis of sexual orientation and transgender status in all areas. The law specifically defines discrimination as follows:

the terms "discrimination" and "discriminatory treatment" shall be used to designate any unwarranted discrimination or unequal treatment, that is to say, [omission] in relation to individuals or groups, as well as members of their families or persons close to them, be it overt or covert, on the grounds of race, skin colour, ancestors, citizenship, national affiliation or ethnic origin, language, religious or political beliefs, gender, gender identity, sexual orientation, financial position, birth, genetic characteristics, health, disability, marital and family status, previous convictions, age, appearance, membership in political, trade union and other organisations and other real or presumed personal characteristics

On 5 July 2011, the Parliament approved a youth act, prohibiting discrimination on the ground of sexual orientation. The law regulates measures and activities undertaken by local governments at improving the social status of youth and creating conditions for addressing their needs and interests.

=== Laws against anti-LGBT speech ===
Since 2003, there has been legislation (part of the Information Act (Serbian: Закон о јавном информисању, Zakon o javnom informisanju)) specifically in place to counter verbal discrimination based on sexual orientation within the media. The same prohibition formed part of the Broadcasting Act adopted in 2002; however, it was never effectively observed, with the Radiodiffusion Agency (an independent government agency) having failed to take any action against offenders. More widely, the Anti-Discrimination Act of 2009 prohibits hate speech on the basis of sexual orientation across wider Serbia society. With the adoption of the new amendments to the Anti-Discrimination Act in 2021, sex characteristics were included as a basis for prohibition of discrimination, making Serbia one of the first countries in the Western Balkans to do so.

=== Hate crime laws ===
On 24 December 2012, the Serbian Parliament approved changes to the Penal Code to introduce the concept of a "hate crime", including on the basis of sexual orientation and gender identity. The first conviction under the law came in 2018.

== Gender identity and expression ==
On 28 July 2011, the Parliament approved a change in the Health Insurance Act (Serbian: Закон о здравственом осигурању, Zakon o zdravstvenom osiguranju), based on which sex change surgeries became partially covered by the statewide basic medical insurance plan, beginning in 2012.

In 2012, The New York Times described Belgrade as a hub for sex reassignment surgery, as prices for such procedures were far lower than in neighbouring and Western countries.

Before 2019, transgender people in Serbia were allowed to change their legal gender only after having undergone sex reassignment surgery. Since 2019, it has been possible to change legal gender with a confirmation from a psychiatrist and an endocrinologist after a year of hormone replacement therapy, without undergoing any surgical procedure. Government-financed health insurance covers up to 65% of the surgery, while the remainder is financed by the patient. According to Jovanka Todorović, a program coordinator at Gayten-LGBT, about 80% of Serbian transgender people are not willing to go through surgery. Some choose to have hormone replacement therapy, which is not financed by health insurance. In addition, a reported 90% of LGBT individuals in Serbia argue that medical institutions are not adequately responding to their needs.

== Military service ==
In 2010, the Serbian Army agreed that gay and bisexual men and women may openly serve in the professional army, but that news was not broadcast widely across media.

== LGBT rights movement ==
=== Organizations ===
Many LGBT organizations have been founded in Serbia, especially in Belgrade and Novi Sad, though also in Niš, Kragujevac, Subotica, Šabac and Zrenjanin.

The first known LGBT organization in Serbia, Arkadija, was founded in 1990 in Belgrade. It shut down in 1995. That same year, Labris was established. Over the years, Labris has become one of Serbia's most prominent LGBT advocacy groups, regularly meeting with local government officials to discuss discrimination and violence prevention, raising awareness of LGBT rights through educational campaigns and public events, and campaigning for increased legal rights for same-sex couples.

Other groups include Gayten LGBT, founded in 2000 in Belgrade, Gay Straight Alliance (Gej Strejt Alijansa), based in Belgrade, Association Duga (Asocijacija Duga), based in Šabac and the region, and Belgrade Pride (Beograd Prajd), established in 2011.

LGBT Vojvodina, Novi Sad Lesbian Organization, and LGBT Novi Sad are among several groups working in the northern region of Serbia, Vojvodina.

GOOSI, based in Belgrade, advocates on behalf and campaigns in favor of LGBT people with disabilities.

=== Online communities and news portals, sorted by founding date, descending ===
- 1998: Gay-Serbia.com
- 2001: Adriatic LGBT Activism, formerly known as Yugoslavian LGBT Activism
- 2001: GayEcho, formerly known as Queeria
- 2008: GayRomeo, version in Serbian
- 2011: Optimist LGBT magazine
- 2012: Szerbiai Magyar LMBT Csoport, the Hungarian LGBT community in Serbia
- 2012: Gay Serbia Guide

== Social conditions ==
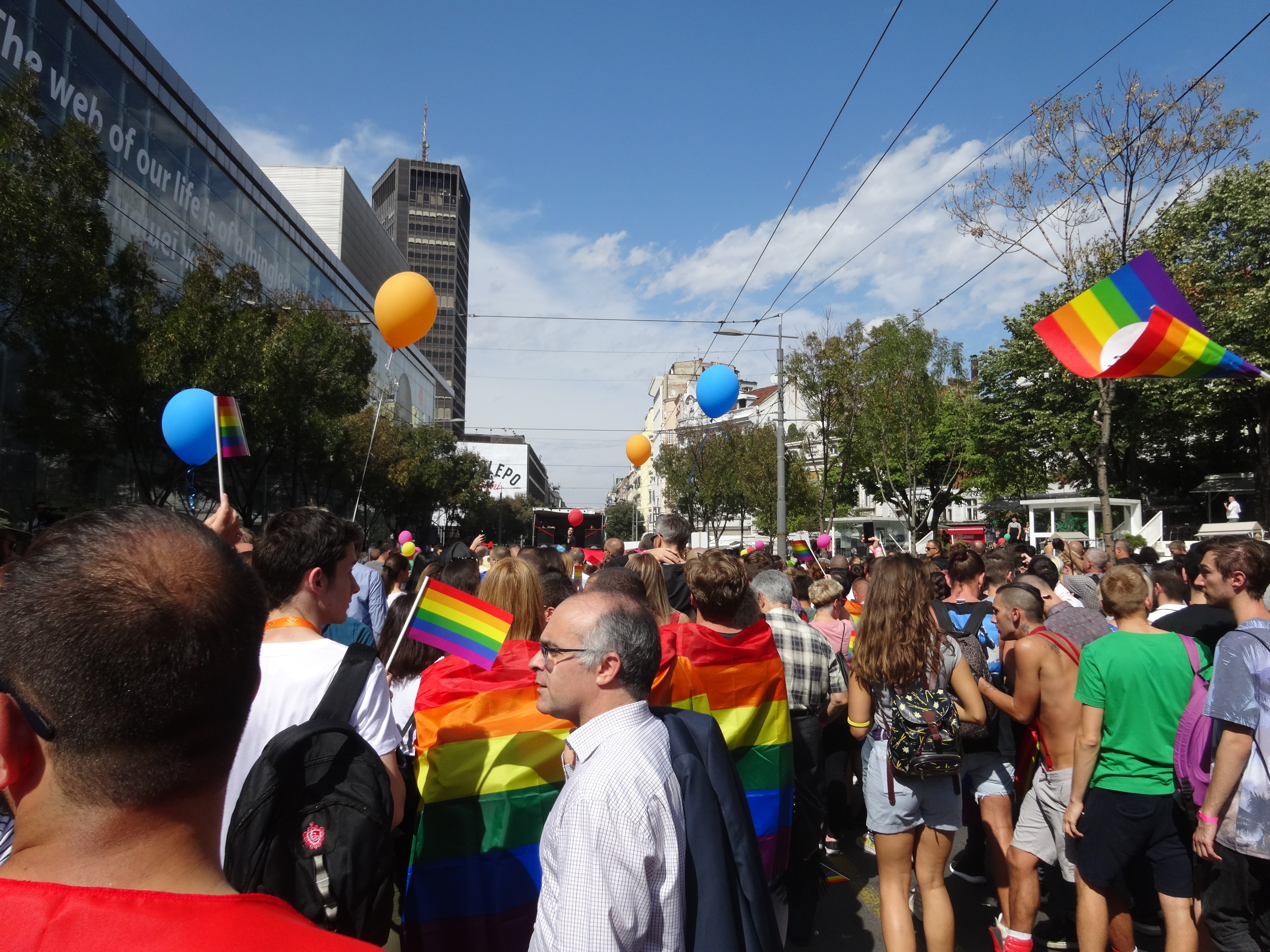
The 2017 Belgrade Pride parade

Gays and lesbians continue to face discrimination and harassment in Serbia. The majority of Serbian people retain strong attitudes against homosexuality. There have been numerous instances of violent gay-bashing, the most extreme during the first Belgrade Gay Pride in 2001.

Several pride events have had to be cancelled. Pride Day celebrations in Belgrade in 2004, and another in Novi Sad in 2007, were cancelled because of the inability to provide adequate safety against violence due to resource constraints. The 2009 Belgrade Pride was also cancelled for similar reasons, as police could not guarantee the safety of the participants. The Second Belgrade Pride parade went ahead on 10 October 2010, with the participation of around a thousand people. However, it was met with violent reaction culminating in the Belgrade anti-gay riot attended by 6,000 anti-gay protesters and extreme nationalist group members.

Official medical textbooks that classify homosexuality under "sexual deviations and disorders" were in circulation and widely used. After several requests to do so, the Serbian Medical Society finally stated that same-sex orientation is not a disease in an official letter to Labris, a Serbian LGBT organization, in 2008. Homosexuality has been removed from the official list of diseases since 1997, when Serbia started applying ICD-10.

The protection of LGBT people in Serbia is further complicated by the existence of various nationalist and neo-Nazi associations like "Obraz" and "1389", which are supported by some right-wing political parties. These groups have, on several occasions, made their threats to LGBT people publicly known though the media, and the police are increasingly reacting to deter such threats publicly.

The development of LGBT rights and culture in Serbia is supported by LGBT sites such as GayEcho and Gay-Serbia and the oldest Adriatic LGBT Activism mailing list in the region.

=== 2016–present ===
In August 2016, Ana Brnabić was appointed minister of public administration and local state governments, becoming the first openly lesbian minister in Serbia. In June 2017, Serbian president Aleksandar Vučić appointed Brnabić to be the prime minister. She was sworn in on 29 June 2017. Her appointment received criticism and opposition from both left-wing and right-wing groups. Left-wing groups accused Brnabić of being a "puppet" to the president and that her sexual orientation would serve as a cover-up for human rights abuses. Right-groups opposed her nomination because of her sexual orientation.

In 2017, a prominent Serbian LGBT activist, Boban Stojanović, received asylum in Canada after documenting approximately 1,000 different pages of violence directed at him and his partner. In an interview in April 2018, Stojanović's partner said the violence put a lot of pressure on them, compelling the couple to leave Serbia.

In September 2017, Prime Minister Brnabić took part in the pride parade in Belgrade. At the event, Brnabić said:

The government is here for all citizens and will secure the respect of rights for all citizens.

In February 2019, Milica Đurđić, Brnabić's partner, gave birth to a son named Igor. According to Agence France-Presse, "Ana Brnabić is one of the first prime ministers whose partner has given birth while in office... and the first in the world in a same-sex couple".

On 17 May 2019, on the occasion of International Day Against Homophobia, Transphobia and Biphobia, several hundred people gathered in the center of Novi Sad for what was described as the northern Serbian city's first gay pride rally. The event was organized by the local Social Center "Izađi" in cooperation with Belgrade Pride and with the support of city officials.

The U.S. Agency for International Development funded programs in 2014 and 2023-2024 to encourage Serbian companies to employ LGBT people, to support economic independence for individuals and economic growth in general.

In September 2022, Belgrade hosted EuroPride, a pan-European event hosted in a different city every year, and dedicated to LGBT pride. In doing so, Belgrade became the first city in Southeast Europe and the first outside the European Economic Area (EEA) to host the event, which featured a variety of concerts, conferences, and parades. The march was initially banned by the authorities on security grounds and was opposed by President Vučić, but after international pressure it went ahead on 17 September 2022 along a shortened route under heavy police protection. Organisers said almost 10,000 people attended, making it one of the largest Pride events ever held in Serbia.

== Public opinion ==
According to the Commissioner for the Protection of Equality, research carried out in 2012 showed that 48% of Serbs believed that homosexuality is an illness.

According to a 2017 poll carried out by ILGA, 59% of Serbians agreed that gay, lesbian and bisexual people should enjoy the same rights as straight people, while 24% disagreed. Additionally, 64% agreed that they should be protected from workplace discrimination. 21% said that people who are in same-sex relationships should be charged as criminals, while 55% disagreed. As for transgender people, 63% agreed that they should have the same rights, 65% believed they should be protected from employment discrimination and 51% believed they should be allowed to change their legal gender.

According to 2018 data cited in the U.S. State Department human rights report, 26 percent of the country's population would cease contact with a person if they learned that person was LGBT, 38 percent of population believed that homosexuality was a disease, 48 percent of parents would seek medical treatment for their LGBT child, 70 percent opposed the right of an LGBT person to inherit the property of their deceased partner, and 90 percent opposed child adoption by LGBT person.

According to 2017 data from the research conducted by Centre E8, 44.0% of females agree that same-sex marriage should be legal (14.8% totally agree and 29.2% agree) while 38.2% oppose (15.0% totally oppose and 23.2 oppose). At the same time, 32.6% of male respondents agree that same-sex marriage should be legal (12.8% totally agree and 19.6% agree) while 50.8% oppose (26.2% totally oppose and 24.6% oppose).

According to 2021 data by Civil Rights Defenders, while support for same-sex marriage remains low (26%), when broken down into individual rights anticipated to be regulated by the Law on Same Sex Union, there is widespread support for each right (59%–73%). 80% of citizens believe LGBTI+ persons should have at least some rights anticipated to be regulated by the Law on Same Sex Union, the second highest among all Western Balkan countries (after Montenegro, which adopted legislation on same-sex registered partnerships in 2020). In the case of almost every right, support is significantly higher among younger (18–29) and university-educated respondents from Belgrade and Vojvodina. Attitudes towards almost all issues related to the LGBTI+ community have remarkably improved in Serbia over the past 5 years. While improvements have been noted, the research shows homophobia is still prevalent on several major accounts across society, such as that 57% believe homosexuality is a disease. Over 2/3 of respondents believe peaceful Pride marches should be allowed to take place in Belgrade.

According to a 2023 Western Balkans public opinion survey by the LGBTI Equal Rights Association (ERA), 69% of respondents in Serbia agreed that LGBT people deserve the same rights as everyone else, up from earlier surveys, while large majorities continued to oppose public expressions of LGBT identity and same-sex couples raising children.

According to a 2022 survey by the World Values Survey, 65% of Serbians disagreed with the statement "homosexual couples are as good parents as other couples". The same survey found that 62% of Serbians "would not like to have homosexuals as neighbors".

== Summary table ==
Same-sex sexual activity legal	Yes (Since 1994, nationwide)
Equal age of consent (14)	Yes (Since 2006)
Anti-discrimination laws in employment	Yes (Since 2005)
Anti-discrimination laws in the provision of goods and services	Yes (Since 2009)
Anti-discrimination laws in all other areas	Yes (Since 2009)
Anti-discrimination laws in the media	Yes (Since 2002)
Hate crime laws include sexual orientation and gender identity	Yes (Since 2012)
Discrimination based on sex characteristics prohibited	Yes (Since 2021)
Same-sex marriages	No (Constitutional ban since 2006)
Same-sex civil unions	
Recognition of same-sex couples	
Stepchild adoption by same-sex couples	No
Joint adoption by same-sex couples	No
Gays, lesbians and bisexuals allowed to serve in the military	Yes (Since 2010)
Right to change legal gender	Yes (Surgery not required)
Access to IVF for lesbian couples	Yes (Since 2021)
Automatic parenthood for both spouses after birth	No
Homosexuality declassified as an illness	Yes (Since 1997)
Conversion therapy banned on minors	No
Commercial surrogacy for gay male couples	(Banned for heterosexual couples as well)
MSMs allowed to donate blood	Yes / No (6 months deferral period)

== See also ==
- Human rights in Serbia
- The Parade (film)
- LGBT rights in Europe
- LGBT history in Serbia
- LGBT history in Yugoslavia
