= LGBTQ history in Serbia =

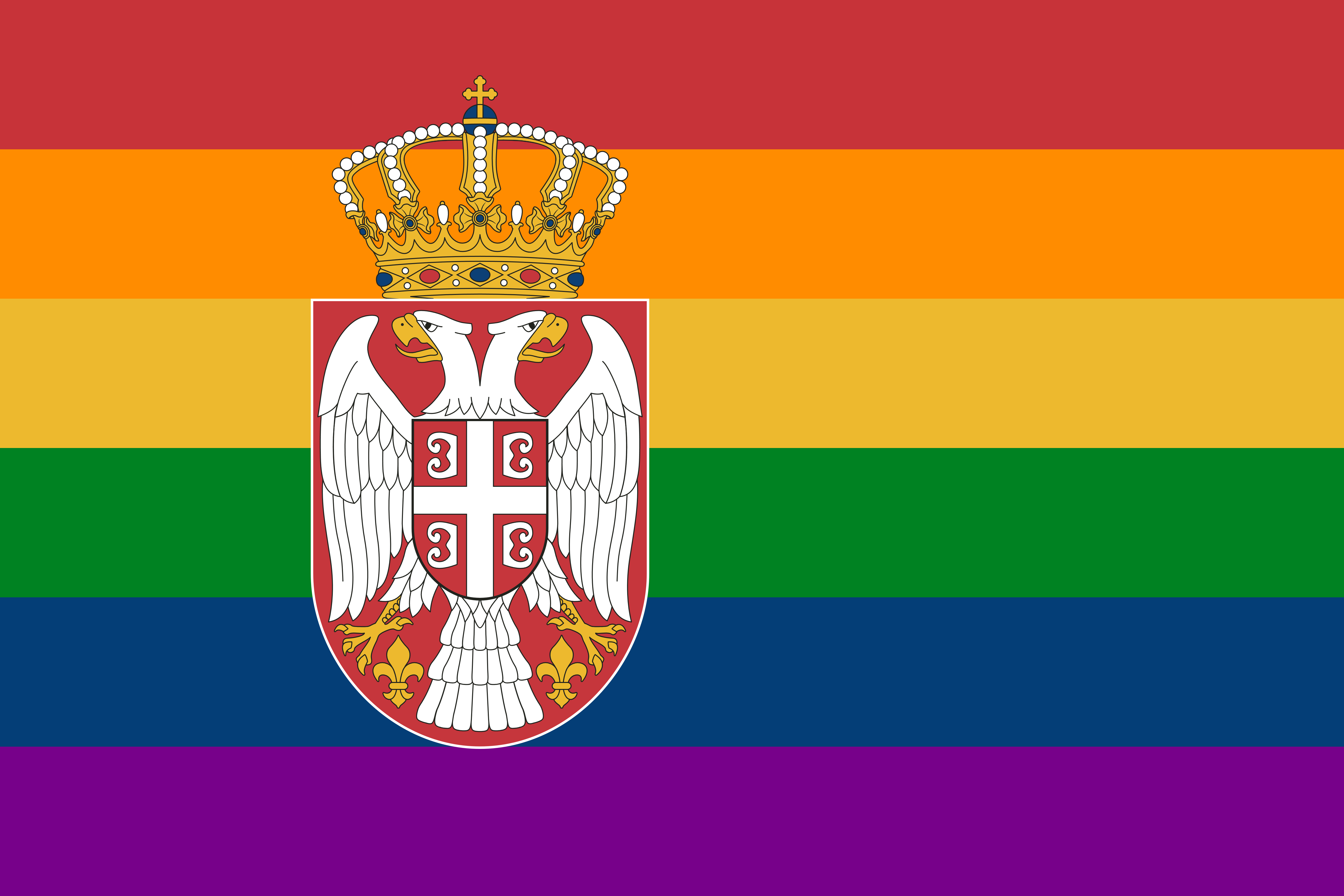
Pride flag of Serbia

Homosexuality in Serbia was first criminalised from 1860 through various regimes, until its first decriminalization in the Socialist Autonomous Province of Vojvodina in 1977. When Vojvodina was reintroduced fully into the Republic of Serbia legal system during the breakout of Yugoslavia, it was recriminalised again, until 1994, when it was decriminalised in the entire Serbia.

== Medieval Serbia ==
While medieval Serb laws prohibited what was called 'unnatural sex', including incest and sexual relationships between monks and nuns, anti-sodomy and anti-homosexuality laws were relatively mild, especially in comparison with much harsher regulations in neighbouring Roman Catholic societies. Dušan's Code didn't mention homosexuality as a punishable sin. The local Orthodox church considered certain activities as sinful but was more concerned with men behaving in a feminine way. Same-sex relationships that did not include anal sex were considered less sinful with kissing between men leading to 40 days of fasting and praying while mutual masturbation would lead to ban on communion for up to two years. 'Passive' male partner was considered to be more sinful than the 'active' one while lesbian sex was not perceived as a great sin. Crossdressing was forbidden to clergy as it was associated with the old Slavic religion.

== Revolutionary Serbia (1804–1813) ==
Although religious laws existed prohibiting same-sex love and relationships, expressions were common in both Orthodox Christian and Islamic society. The primary expression of same-sex love for Orthodox Christians were brotherhood unions known as "Pobratimstvo" (Adelphopoiesis). The early nineteenth century saw a time of relative turmoil for Serbia, with sporadic periods of stability. In 1804, Serbia gained its autonomy from the Ottoman Empire following two uprisings. Karađorđe's Criminal Code (Карађорђев криминални законик) was subsequently promulgated by the Serbian Jurisprudential Council (Praviteljstvujušči sovjet serbski) sometime in late spring or early summer 1807, and remained in force until 7 October 1813, when the Ottoman Empire re-gained control of Serbia. The Code penalised certain issues related to marital life and sexuality (such as forced marriage, rape, separation/divorce without the approval of a clerical court, and infanticide). It did not, however, mention same-sex sexual activity; and so homosexuality became effectively legal for a period of six years.

== Principality of Serbia (1815–1882) ==
In 1858, the Ottoman Empire, of which Serbia was nominally a vassal, legalized same-sex sexual intercourse. Various officials during the late Ottoman period took on Đojleni, paid male lovers.

However, the progressive reforms introduced by Prince Alexander Karađorđević and Prince Mihailo were overturned when Miloš Obrenović returned to power. In the first post-Medieval Criminal Code of the Principality of Serbia, named "Kaznitelni zakon" (Law of Penalties), adopted in 1860, sexual intercourse "against the order of nature" between males became punishable by 6 months to 4 years imprisonment. Like in many other countries' legal documents of the time, lesbian sexuality was ignored and not mentioned.

== Yugoslavia ==
=== Kingdom of Yugoslavia (1918–1941) ===
In 1937 Belgrade based daily newspaper Politika published news about young man from Central Serbia who arrived in Belgrade with his brothers to change his sex.

=== National Liberation War 1941–1945 ===
There are sources about homosexual Yugoslav Partisans during World War II in Yugoslavia. Milovan Đilas in his war memoirs tells the story from Sandžak where one Muslim soldier was exposed as homosexual by other soldiers and Regional Secretary. Regional Secretary in doubt ask Đilas if he should "execute this freak", while Đilas remains in doubt admitting that at the time he did not know Communist Party of Yugoslavia practice nor anything was said about such matters by Marx and Lenin. At the end under common sense he concluded that "from such vices suffer proletarians, and not only bourgeois decadent" but that he can not have functions or be party member. Đilas says that he only later learned "that that homosexual, who in appearance was sheer manhood, was very brave and courageously fell in battle".

=== SFR Yugoslavia (1945–1992) ===
The Socialist Federal Republic of Yugoslavia later restricted the offence in 1959 to only apply to homosexual anal intercourse; but with the maximum sentence reduced from 2 to 1 year imprisonment.

In 1990 in Hotel Moskva in Belgrade, which was a popular gay gathering place in the 1970s, one gay and lesbian group began to organise meetings and in January 1991 they founded the Arkadija organisation.

== 21st century ==
The first pride walk took place in 2001. As the walk progressed in Belgrade, it was stopped when protesters and police clashed with one another. In the years, 2009, 2011, 2012, and 2013, the LGBT community of Serbia scheduled a gay pride walk that received the treatment of getting banned each year by the authorities in the country.

In 2008, the Serbian Medical Society determined that being LGBT was not a disease, being a member of the " World Health Organization", deferring from its opinions.

In 2009, GayEcho declared Jelena Karleuša to be gay icon in Serbia.

In 2010, the pride march was attempted again. Similar results to the first march, this march was visited by thousands of individuals such as football fans and members of "right-wing" organizations. These individuals caused destruction, such as throwing missiles, stones, and setting cars on fire. The mayhem destroyed the walk, and also injured police officers. This march was overshadowed by 6,500 protesters. The pride walk was banned in 2011 which led the members of the gay community to believe that this act was a sign that supported violence towards gay people. Those in the Serbian LGBT community feared for their lives, due to severe cruelty by people with homophobic mindsets. Risks of violence continued to be high in Serbia against the LGBT community. Fourteen percent of respondents who took a survey, felt as if acts of violence was a proper way to respond to homosexuality.

Boris Melicevic was an openly gay leader for Serbia who became a part of a political party in December 2010. In 2010, Serbia passed the "anti-discrimination law", which protected LGBT Serbians from being treated unequal. More than half of Serbians say that they are against violence and discrimination against homosexuals, however roughly two-thirds of the country believed that identifying as a homosexual was a disease.

In May 2014, Amnesty International identified Serbia as one of a number of countries where there is a marked lack of will to tackle homophobia and transphobia, noting that public authorities had repeatedly banned pride marches on the basis of violent threats from homophobic groups. A pride parade successfully took place in September 2014 in Belgrade.

In 2016, the association ILGA-Europe ranked Serbia 28th in terms of LGBT rights out of 49 observed European countries.

In June 2017, Ana Brnabić became the Prime Minister of Serbia, as the first woman and first openly gay person to hold the office, and the second female LGBT head of government overall (after Jóhanna Sigurðardóttir of Iceland). She was also the first Serbian Prime Minister to attend a pride parade.

== See also ==
- LGBT history in Yugoslavia
- LGBT rights in Serbia
