= Belgrade anti-gay riot =

Violence against LGBTQ people on 10 October 2010 in Serbia

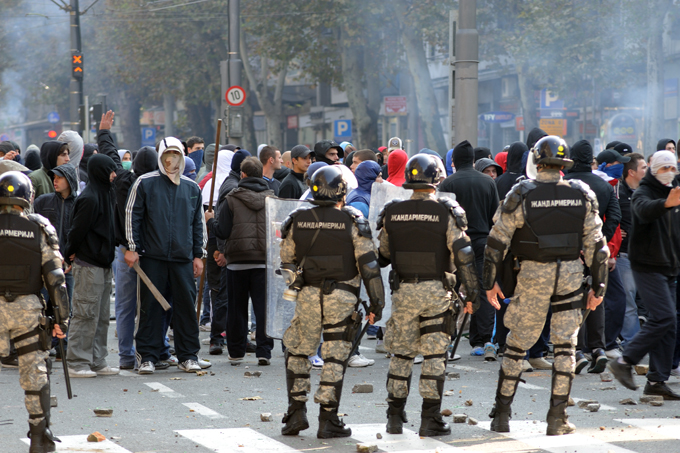
- Clashes between Gendarmery personnel and anti-gay rioters during the riot
- Date: 10 October 2010
- Location: Belgrade, Serbia
- Caused by: Attempt to disrupt the pride parade
- Methods: Riot, assault, arson, vandalism, gay bashing

Parties
Anti-gay pride and anti-government protesters: Football supporters (ultras, hooligans); Delije; Grobari; United Force; Other supporters' groups; Nationalists; Other protesters; Serbian Orthodox Church	Government of Serbia: Ministry of Internal Affairs; Police of Serbia; Gendarmery; Government parties: Democratic Party; Socialist Party of Serbia; Other government parties and pro-government parties or organizations; Gay pride protesters: LGBTQ activists; Other parties: Liberal Democratic Party; Other parties or organizations; Others: Liberals; Anarchists

Casualties
- Injuries: 95
- Arrested: 101

The Belgrade anti-gay riot was an incident of violence against LGBTQ people that occurred on 10 October 2010 during a pride parade, organized to promote LGBTQ rights in Serbia. The gay pride parade has been the first in Belgrade since 2001; a planned parade in 2009 was cancelled due to the threat of violence.

Anti-gay and anti-government protesters fought with about 5,000 armed police, throwing Molotov cocktails, bricks, stones, glass bottles and firecrackers; the police used tear gas and rubber bullets. There were no fatalities.

== Results ==
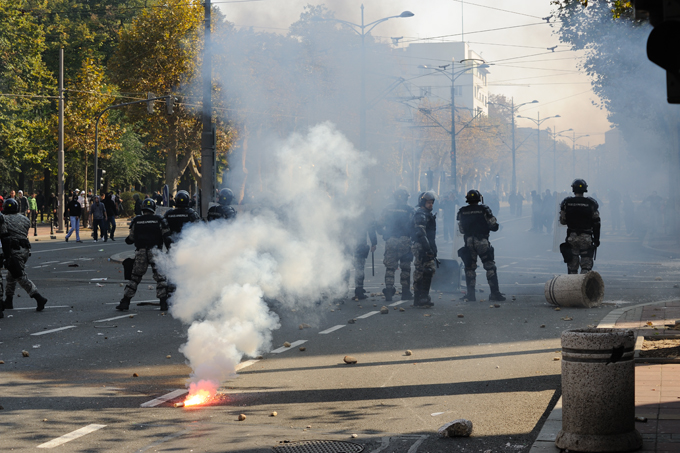
Clashes between Gendarmery personnel and anti-gay rioters

Police said that 78 police officers and 17 civilians had been injured, and 101 people had been detained for violent behaviour. The garage of the building of the ruling pro-European Democratic Party was set ablaze, and the state TV building and the headquarters of other political parties were also damaged. The parade was viewed as a test for the government of Serbia, which has stated it will protect human rights in Serbia as it seeks to become an EU member. Jelko Kacin, presiding over the European Union's evaluation of Serbia, said that Serbia's failure to stop the riot could damage its bid to join the EU. During a visit to Belgrade two days after the riot, US Secretary of State, Hillary Clinton, praised the Serbian government for protecting the human rights of the parade participants.

== See also ==
- LGBT rights in Serbia
- 2010 in LGBT rights
