= BIH Pride March =

Annual event in Sarajevo, Bosnia and Herzegovina

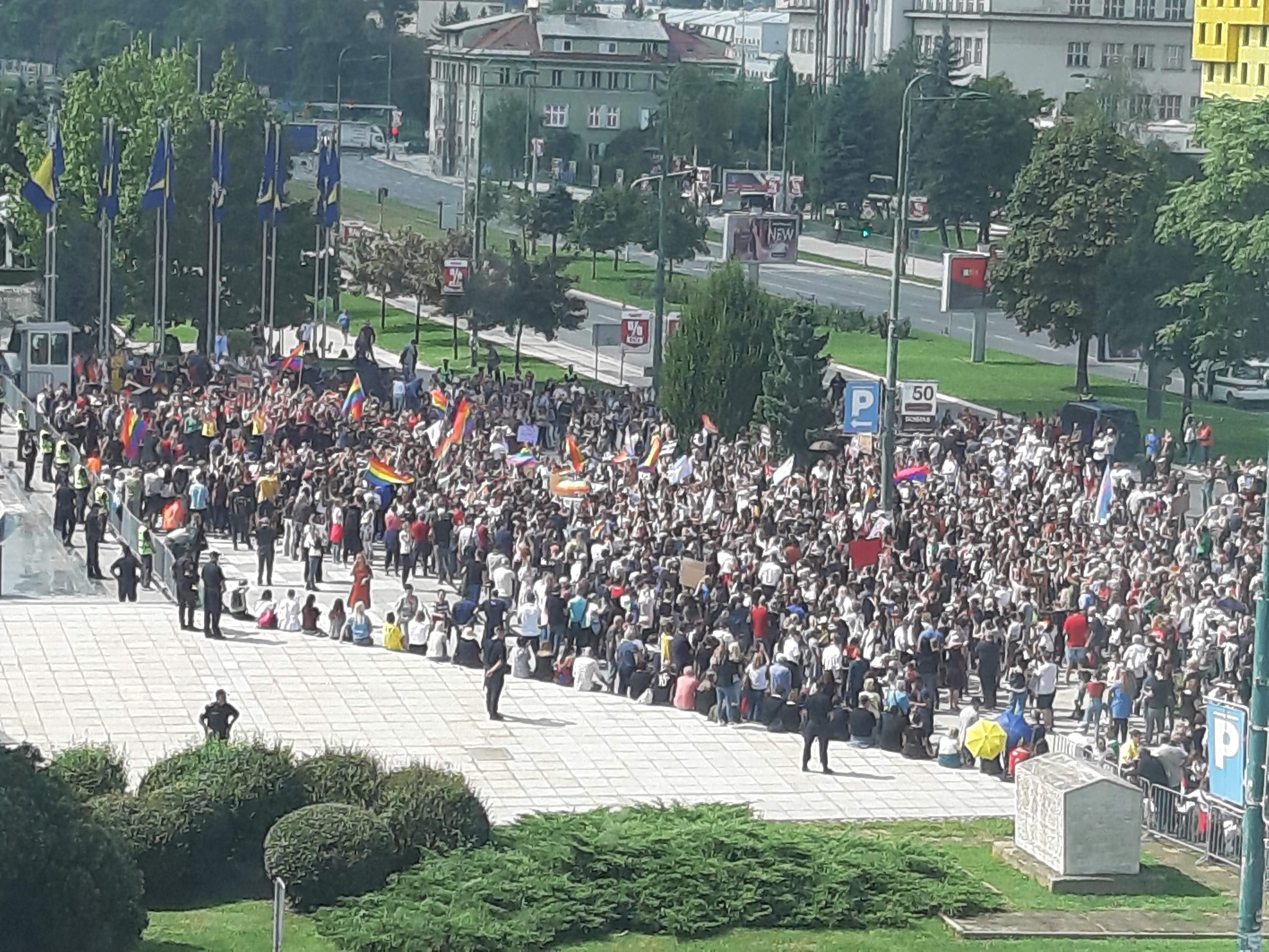
- BIH Pride March, September 2019
- Venue: open air & multiple venues
- Location: Sarajevo, Bosnia and Herzegovina
- Cause: celebration of the lesbian, gay, bisexual, transgender (LGBT) people and their allies
- Website: povorkaponosa.ba

The BIH Pride March (BH. Povorka Ponosa, also called Sarajevo Pride or Bosnian-Herzegovinian Pride) is the LGBT pride parade in the city of Sarajevo, the capital of Bosnia and Herzegovina, which first took place in September 2019.

== History ==
The country's first pride parade was held on 9 September 2019 in Sarajevo. An estimated 2,000 people marched in the first pride parade of Bosnia and Herzegovina, making the country the last former Yugoslav nation to hold a pride event.

A second pride parade was supposed to take place on 23 August 2020, starting at noon in Sarajevo, but it was canceled due to the COVID-19 pandemic. The second pride parade in Sarajevo therefore took place on 14 August 2021.

Religious groups in Bosnia and Herzegovina condemned the BIH Pride March, and Bosniak political and religious groups organized rallies against the parade.

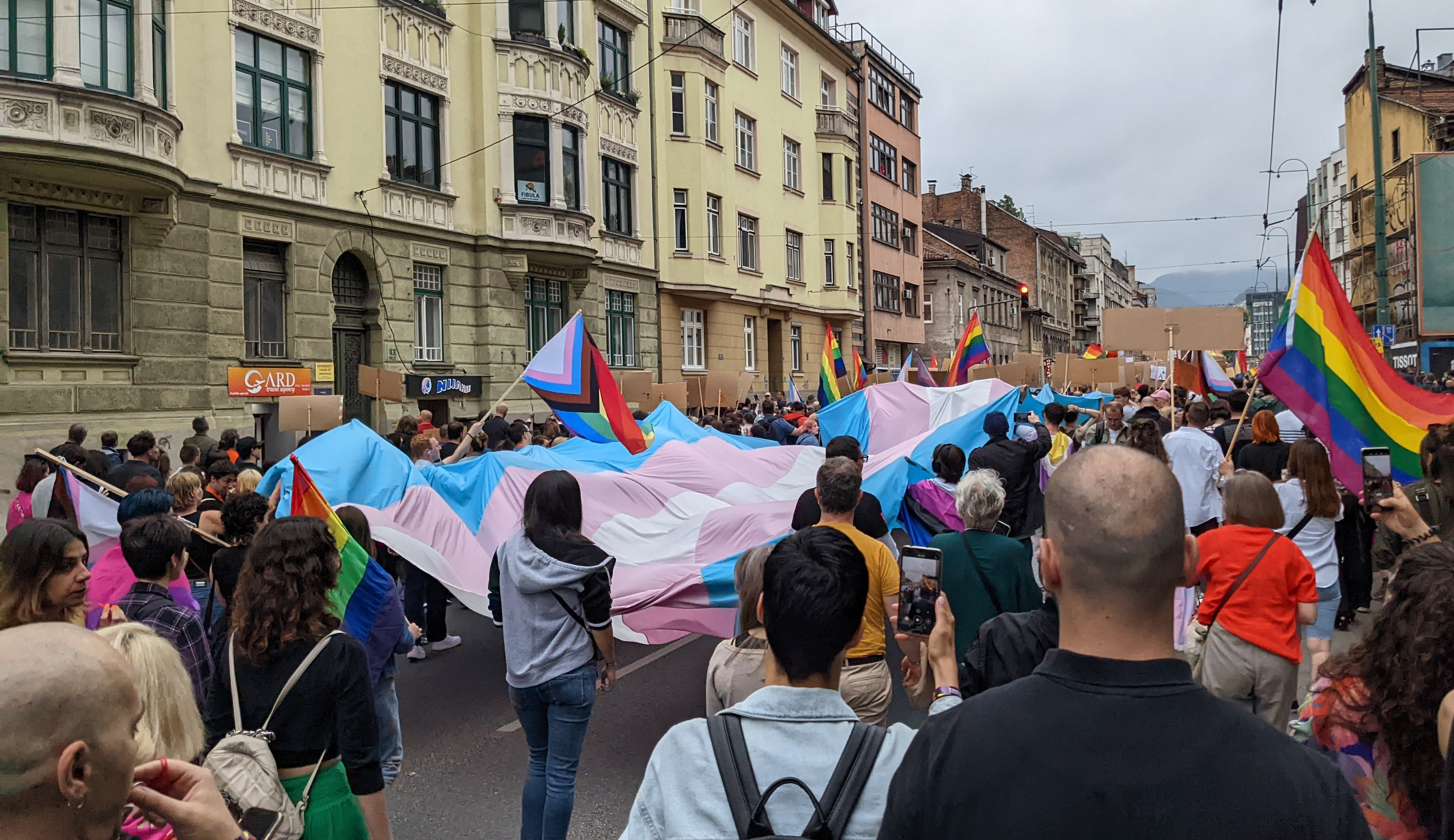
BIH Pride March, June 2023

The third pride parade in Sarajevo was held on 25 June 2022 under the slogan "Family Gathering", with which the organizers pointed out the importance of family support for queer people. About 1,000 citizens joined the procession, and the event itself was accompanied by strong security measures. In addition to the organizers, the Prime Minister of Sarajevo Canton, Edin Forto, also sent a message from the meeting, saying that this is a protest of citizens for greater rights, referring to political and homophobic comments on social networks.

== List of parades ==
#	Year	Dates	Motto	Estimated attendance
1st	2019	9 September	Door please! ("Ima izać'!")	2,000
	2020	23 August	No life within four walls ("Nije život četiri zida")	postponed
2nd	2021	14 August	Resistance from the Margin ("Otpor sa margine")	300
3rd	2022	25 June	Family gathering ("Porodično okupljanje")	1,000
4th	2023	24 June	Proudly together ("Ponosno zajedno")	1,000
5th	2024	22 June	I like not to be afraid ("Volim da se ne bojim")	
6th	2025	14 June	Love is the law ("Ljubav je zakon")	
7th	2026	20 June	All colors look good on us ("Sve nam boje dobro stoje")	

== See also ==
- LGBT rights in Bosnia and Herzegovina
