= LGBTQ history in Yugoslavia =

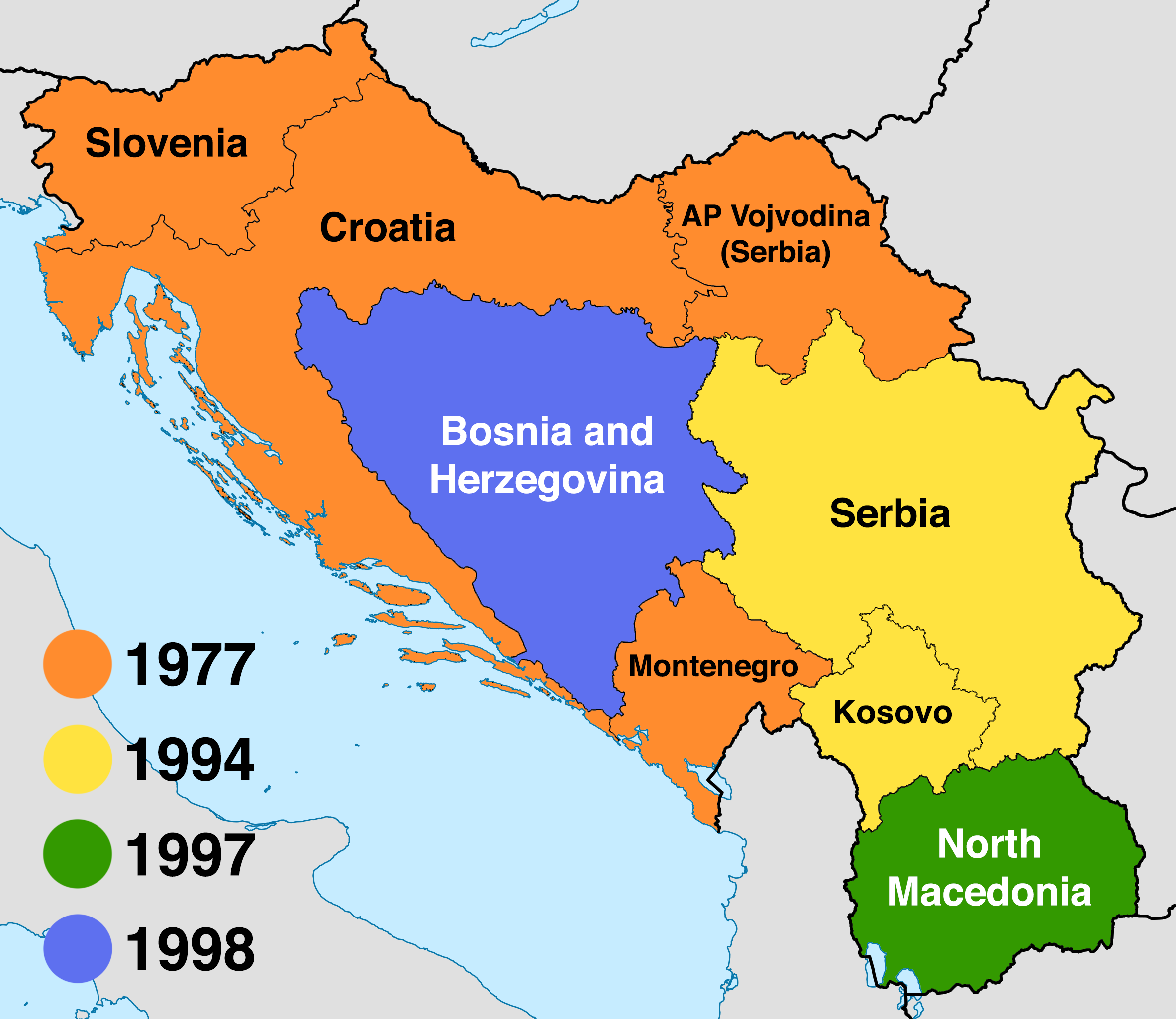
The years in which the constitutive republics and provinces of Yugoslavia decriminalized homosexuality

Homosexuality in Yugoslavia was first decriminalized in the Socialist Republics of Croatia, Slovenia, Montenegro and the Socialist Autonomous Province of Vojvodina in 1977. In other regions anti-LGBT legislation was, to varying degrees, progressively not implemented. The capital city of Belgrade, together with Zagreb and Ljubljana, became some of the first spots of an organized LGBT movement in the Balkans.

Following the violent breakup of Yugoslavia some authors analyzed regional cooperation and networks in former Yugoslavia as a form of conscious rejection of nationalism representing important features of contemporary LGBTQ activism in South East Europe.

== Kingdom of Yugoslavia ==
In the first post-medieval Criminal Code of the Principality of Serbia, named "Kaznitelni zakon" (Law of Penalties), adopted in 1860, sexual intercourse "against the order of nature" between males became punishable by from 6 months' to 4 years' imprisonment. As typical for the time, homosexual relations between women were excluded. In 1937, Belgrade-based daily newspaper Politika published news about a young man from Central Serbia who arrived in Belgrade with his brothers to change his gender.

== World War II ==
=== Independent State of Croatia ===
In the Nazi Germany puppet state Independent State of Croatia (NDH), homosexuals were persecuted and sent to concentration camps such as Jasenovac, regardless of their nationalities or ideological orientations. Very little research has been done on the experiences of homosexuals during the World War II in Yugoslavia; only a small insight was given by the Croatian author Ilija Jakovljević in his text Konclogor na Savi (English: Concentration Camp on Sava), in which he mentioned that in prison on Square N16 in Zagreb he met a "lover of the male body", referring only to the man's identity and not whether he was imprisoned for his sexual orientation.

=== National Liberation War 1941–1945 ===
There are two accounts about homosexual Yugoslav Partisans during World War II in Yugoslavia. One known death sentence was issued by a Croatian detachment of the National Liberation Army for the commander of the Croatian Partisans' communication network, Josip Mardešić, after he was discovered to have had affairs with his male subordinates. The other account was given by Milovan Djilas in his war memoirs, where he tells a story from Sandžak where "one Muslim, a good soldier and a zealous communist" was exposed as homosexual by other soldiers to the Regional Secretary, Rifat Burdžović. The Regional Secretary in doubt asked Djilas if he should "execute [the] freak?", while Djilas remained in doubt, admitting that, at the time, he neither knew Communist Party of Yugoslavia (KPJ) practice nor anything said on such matters by Marx and Lenin. At the end, he concluded that "from such vices suffer proletarians, and not only bourgeoisie decadents" and that it cannot be tolerated for homosexuals to have any party functions, nor to be among the leaders of the partisan movement. Djilas said that he only later learned that "that homosexual, who in appearance was sheer manhood, was very brave and courageously fell in battle".

== Socialist Yugoslavia ==
=== Postwar persecution ===
In the postwar period, there were more examples of persecution and inhumane treatment of homosexual individuals. One of the cases took place in 1952 in Dubrovnik, where members of Communist Party arrested homosexuals, put bags with pejorative inscriptions on their heads and led them through the city. When the Socialist Federal Republic of Yugoslavia was formed, it adopted the Yugoslav Criminal Code of 1929, a previous law of the Kingdom of Yugoslavia which forbade "lewdness against the order of nature" (anal intercourse). In 1959, male homosexuality was officially criminalized in Yugoslavia, with a penalty of imprisonment for one year. Around five hundred male homosexuals have been imprisoned between 1951 and 1977, about half of which served probation, and others served shorter sentences. For comparison, many Western European countries (such as West Germany, United Kingdom and Italy) convicted several tens of thousands of homosexuals during the same period.

=== Liberalization in the 1970s ===
In the 1970s, following the sexual revolution in much of Western Europe, the legal and social sphere of Yugoslavia started to liberalize towards LGBT rights. In 1973, the Croatian Medical Chamber removed homosexuality from the list of mental disorders. In 1974, a law professor at the University of Ljubljana, Ljubo Bavcon, urged the decriminalization of homosexuality as one of the members of the Commission for the Adoption of Criminal Law of the Socialist Republic of Slovenia. The League of Communists of Yugoslavia held debates on the topic at least three times until 1976, when it requested decriminalization in all republics subject to each party branch approval. Federal units of Yugoslavia that decriminalized homosexuality were the Socialist Republics of Croatia, Slovenia, Montenegro and Socialist Autonomous Province of Vojvodina in 1977. Other parts of the Federation made this move only after the breakup of Yugoslavia: Serbia (excluding Vojvodina) in 1994, Macedonia in 1997 and finally Bosnia and Herzegovina (both the Federation of Bosnia and Herzegovina and the Republika Srpska) in 1998.

=== LGBT activism ===
The first six-day long festival of gay culture in Yugoslavia was organized in April 1984 in Ljubljana. In the same year, the first gay organization Magnus was founded in Ljubljana and in 1987, the first lesbian organisation founded was Lezbijska Lilit (LL). The first regular radio broadcast that, amongst other marginalized groups, dealt with gay issues was the 1985 Zagreb-based Frigidna utičnica (English: Frigid Socket) on Omladinski radio, whose host Toni Marošević was openly gay. Because of disapproval from Večernji list and the Večernje novosti program, it was quickly removed from the station programming. In its 1986 proclamation, the organization Magnus demanded the introduction of prohibition of discrimination based on sexual orientation in the Yugoslav Constitution, decriminalization of homosexuality in the whole of Yugoslavia, the introduction of curriculum that would present homosexuality and heterosexuality on equal terms and demanded a protest of the Federal Government of Yugoslavia against the Socialist Republic of Romania, the Soviet Union, Iran and other countries where homosexuality was still criminalized at that time. In 1990 in Hotel Moskva in Belgrade, which was a popular gay gathering place in the 1970s, one gay and lesbian group began to organize meetings and, in January 1991, they founded the organization Arkadija.

=== LGBT topics in pop culture ===
==== Music ====
Arguably the first LGBT-themed song on the Yugoslav popular music scene was the early 1970s song "Nisam htjela nju" ("I Didn't Want Her") by art rock band Porodična Manufaktura Crnog Hleba; although the band performed the song live, their record label refused to include the song on their 1974 album Stvaranje (Creation). In the second half of the 1970s first songs that deal with issues of lesbian and gay population appeared on albums by Yugoslav artists. They were very different in genre, from rock, new wave, post-punk, electropop to the traditional folk music. Some of the most popular songs with LGBT themes are "Neki dječaci" ("Some Boys") by Prljavo Kazalište, "Balada o tvrdim grudima" ("Ballad About the Rough Chest") by Šarlo Akrobata, "Retko te viđam sa devojkama" ("I Rarely See You With Girls") by Idoli, "Moja prijateljica" ("My Friend") by Xenia, "Ana" by Videosex, "Javi mi" ("Notify Me") by Zabranjeno Pušenje, "Preživjeti" ("To Survive") by KUD Idijoti, and "Modesty Blaise" by Bel Tempo.

== See also ==
- LGBT history in Bosnia and Herzegovina
- LGBT history in Croatia
- LGBT history in Kosovo
- LGBT history in Montenegro
- LGBT history in North Macedonia
- LGBT history in Serbia
- LGBT history in Slovenia
- Communism and LGBT rights
