= Lukavac (Valjevo) =

Lukavac Лукавац
- Village
- Location within Serbia
- Coordinates: 44°18′N 19°59′E
- Country: Serbia
- District: Kolubara District
- Municipality: Valjevo

Population (2002)
  - Total: 1,054
- Time zone: UTC+1 (CET)
  - Summer (DST): UTC+2 (CEST)

Lukavac is a village in the municipality of Valjevo, Serbia. According to the 2002 census, the village has a population of 1054 people.

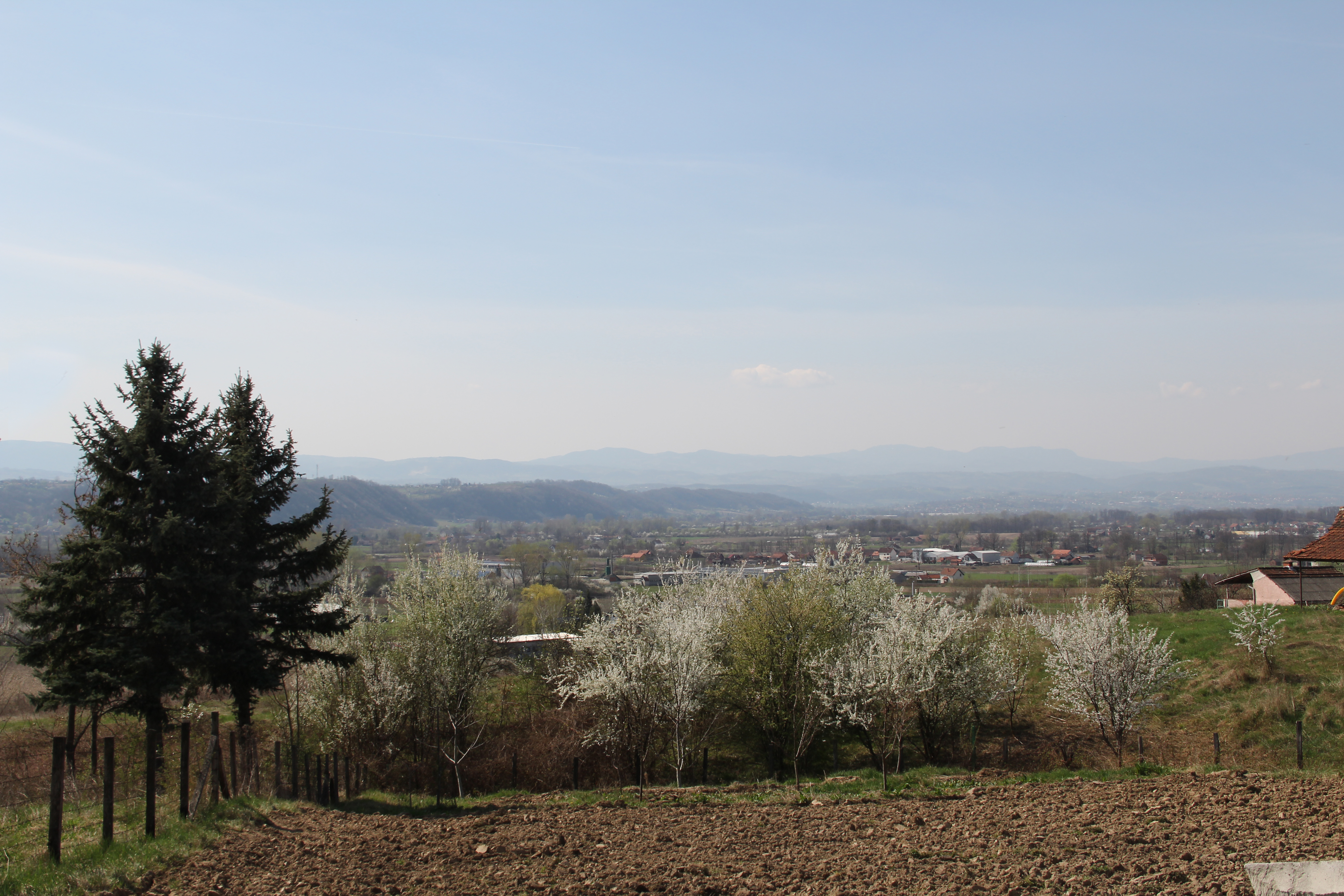
Lukavac - panorama

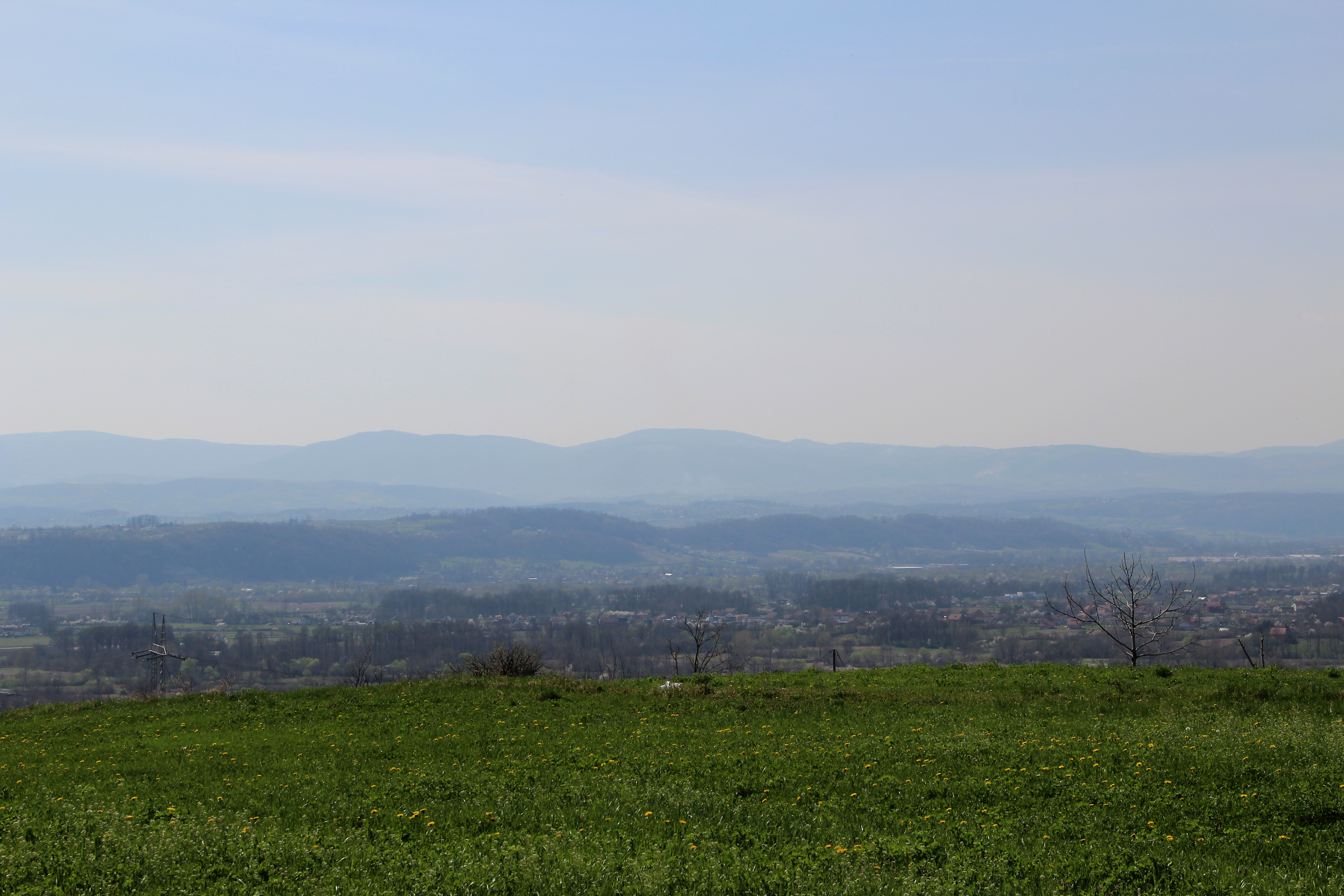
Lukavac - panorama

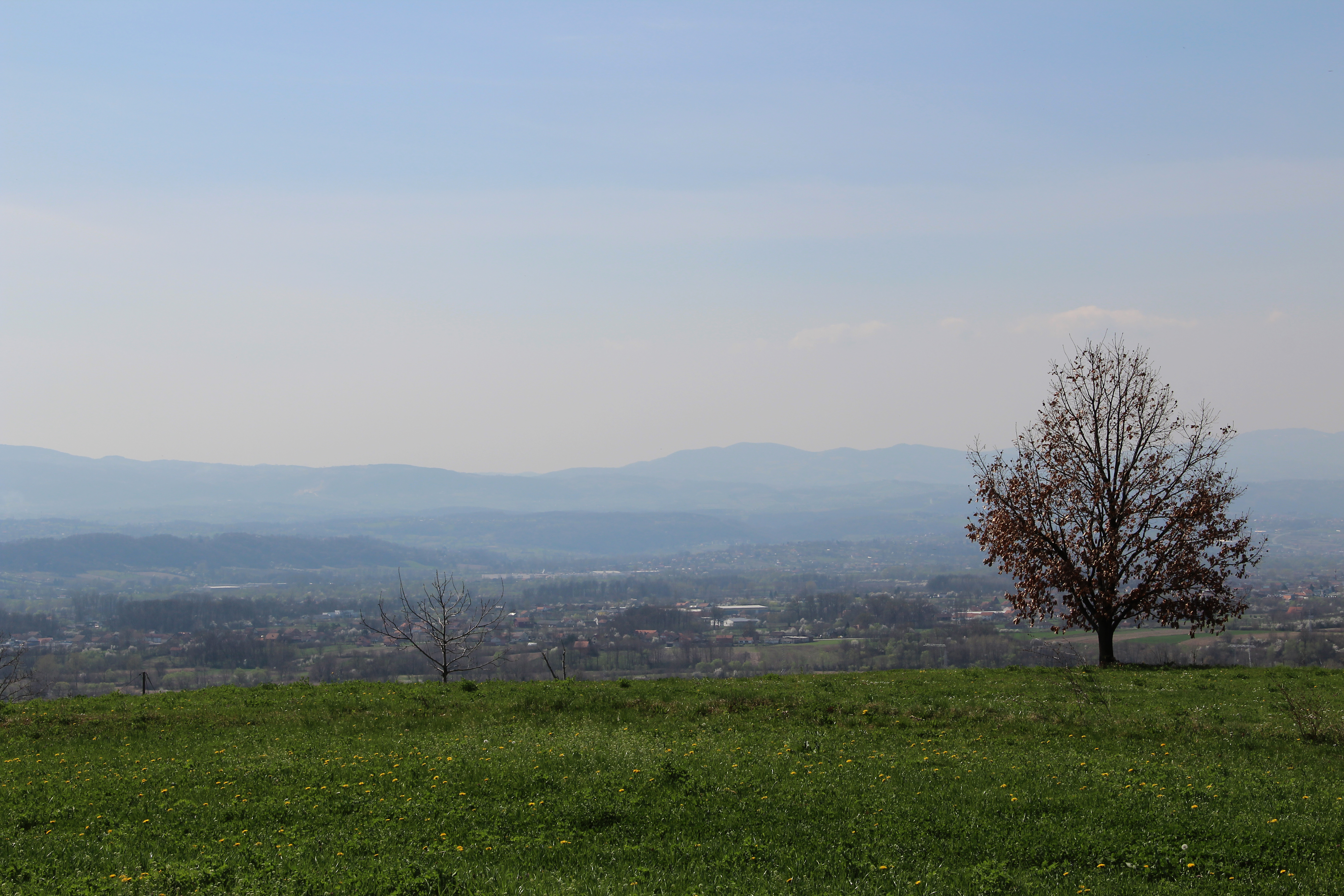
Lukavac - panorama

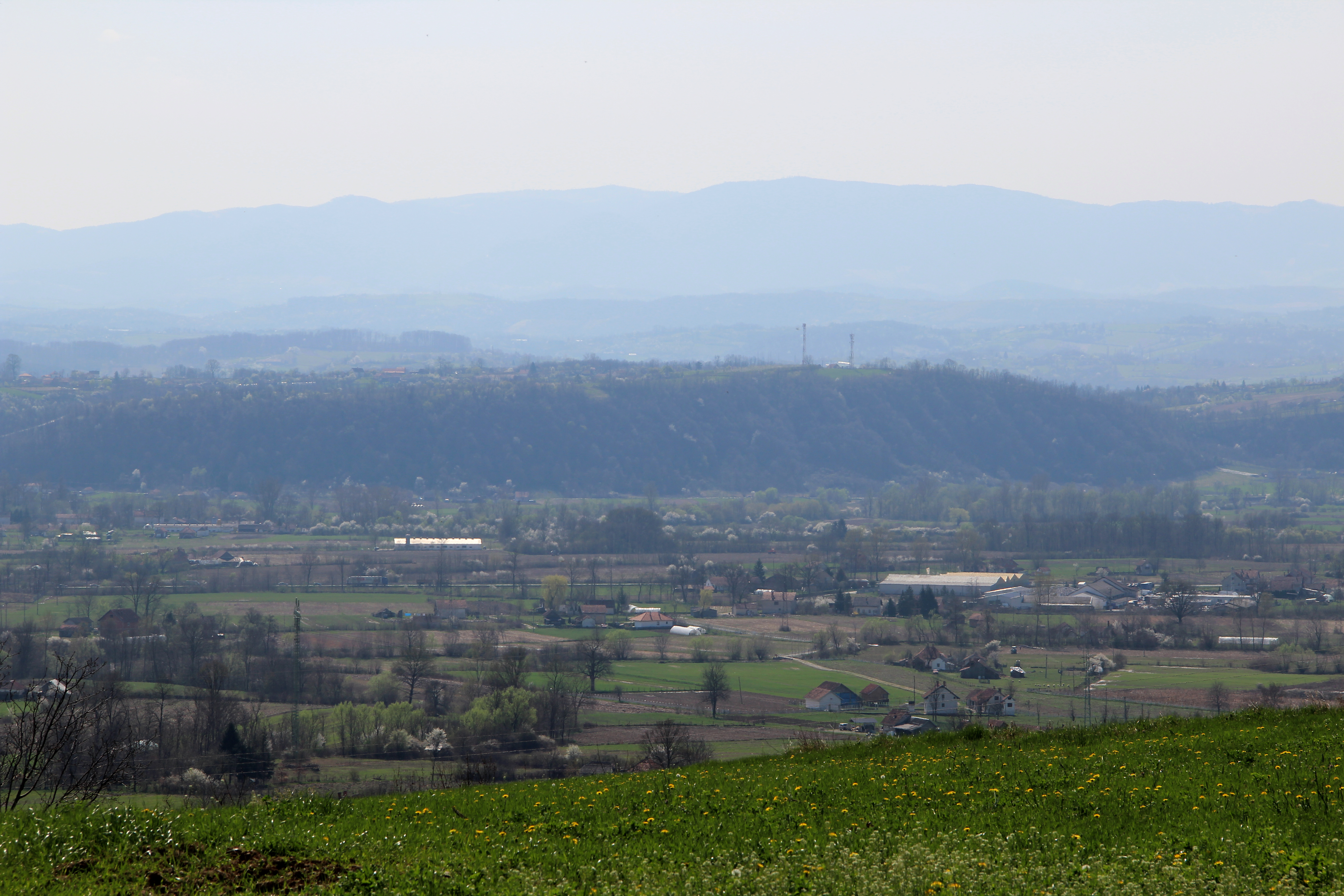
Lukavac - panorama

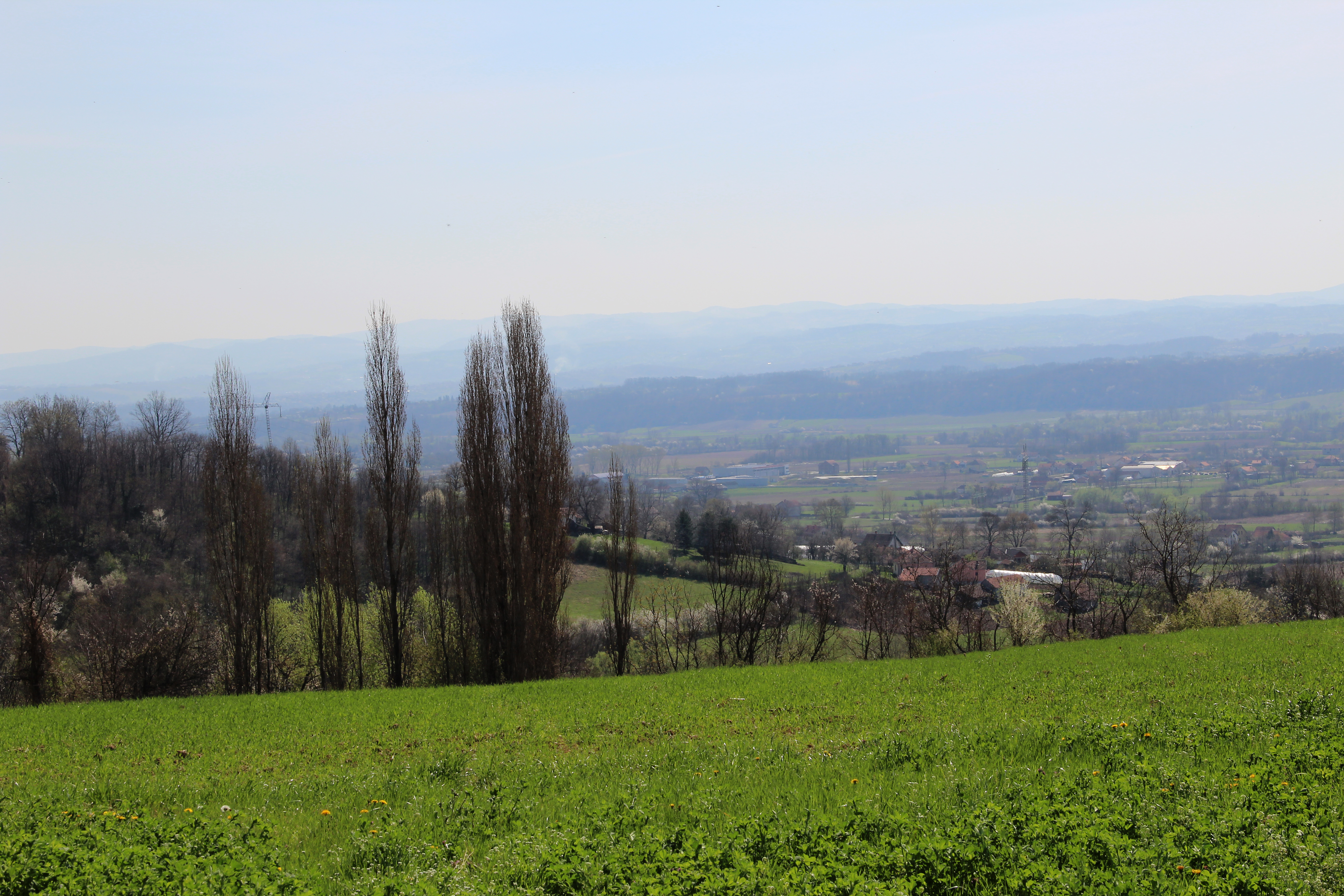
Lukavac - panorama

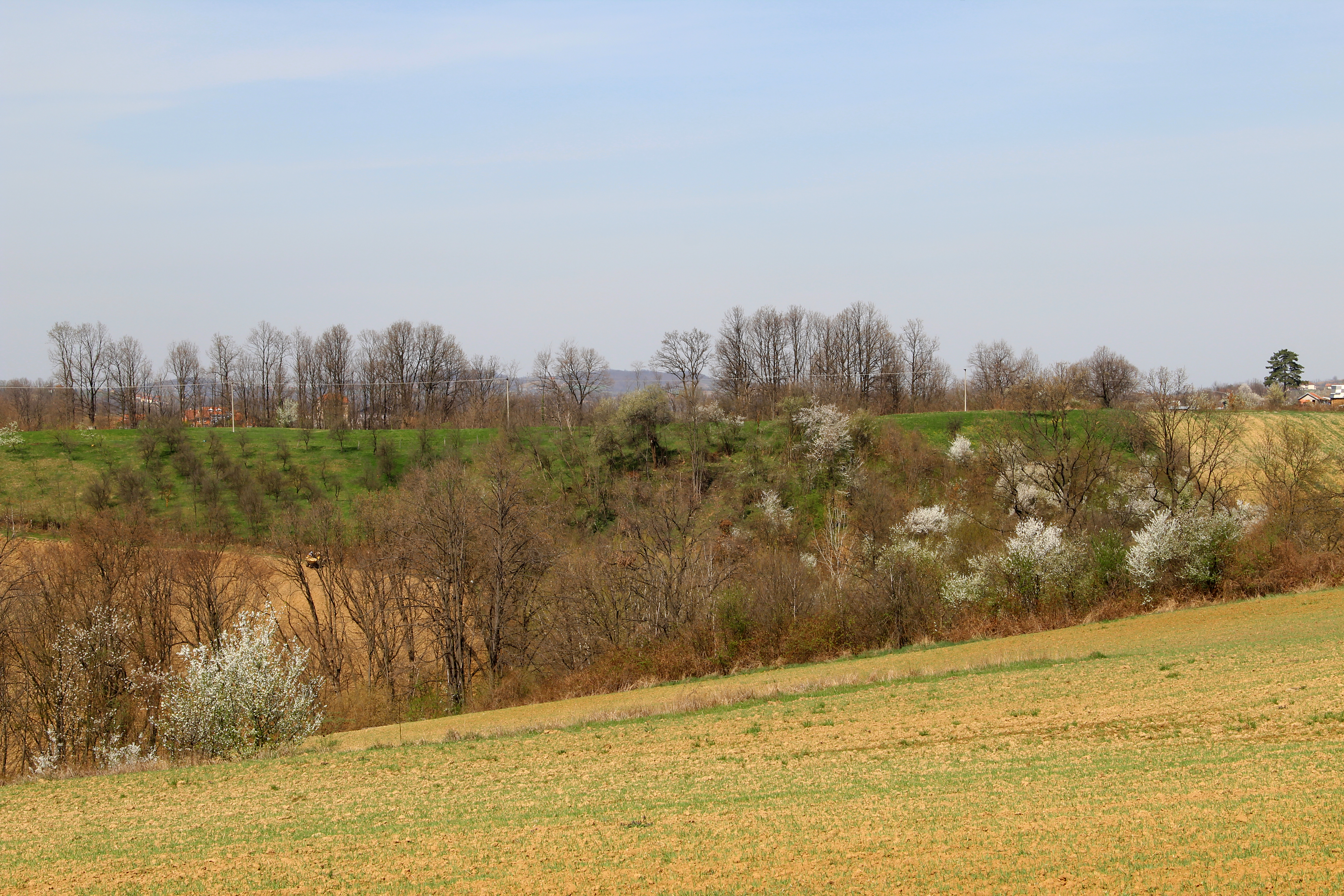
Lukavac - panorama

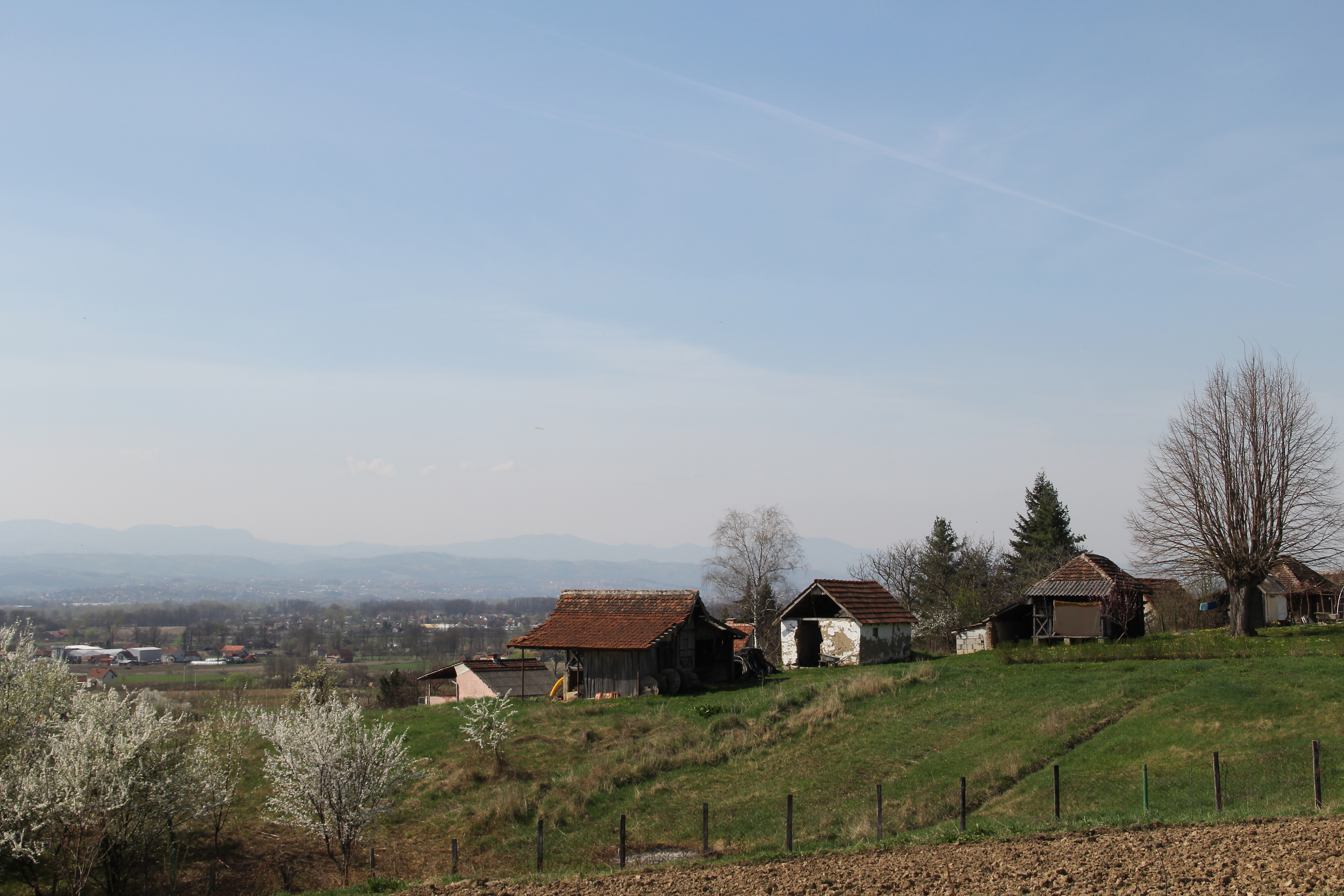
Lukavac - rural household

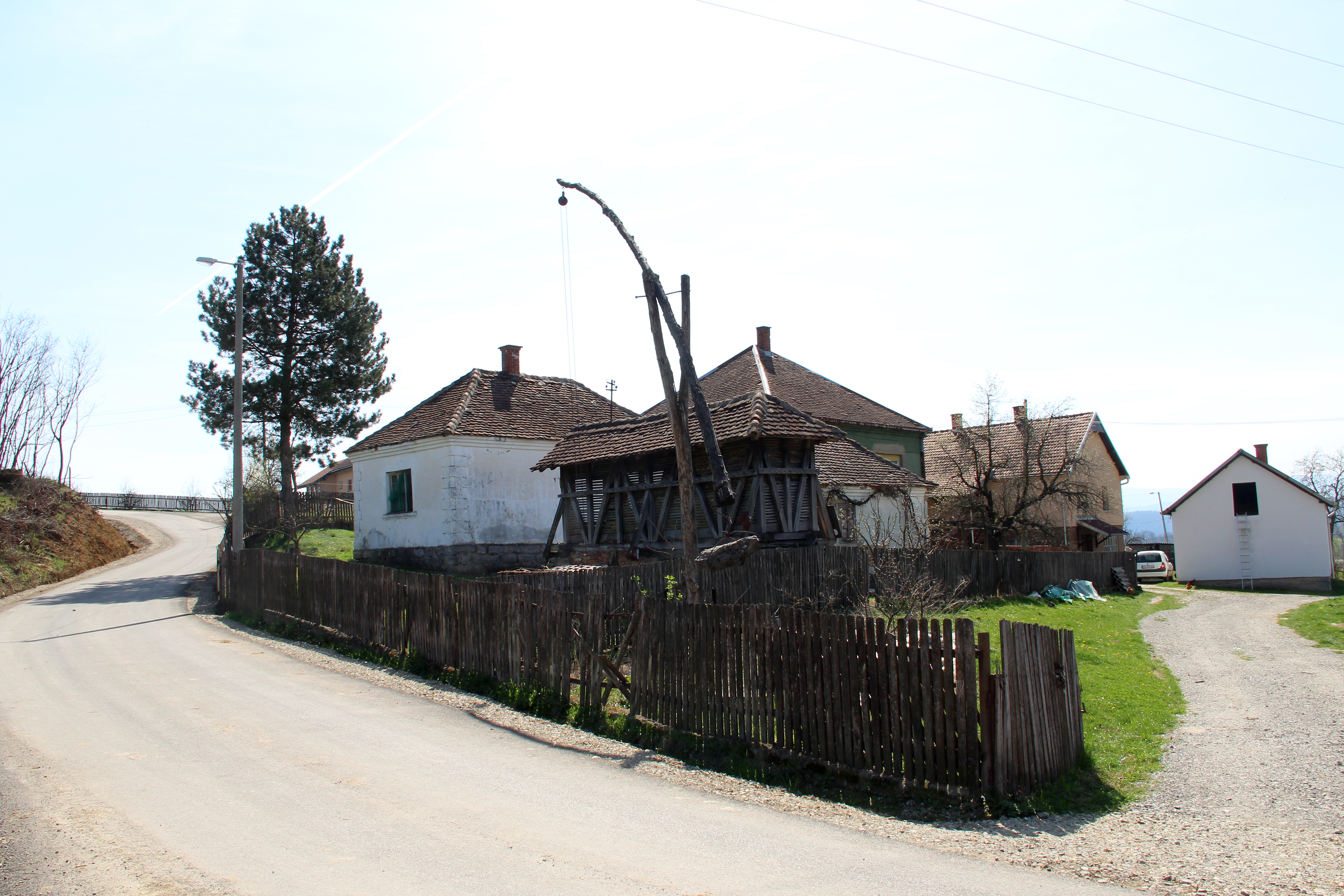
Lukavac - rural household

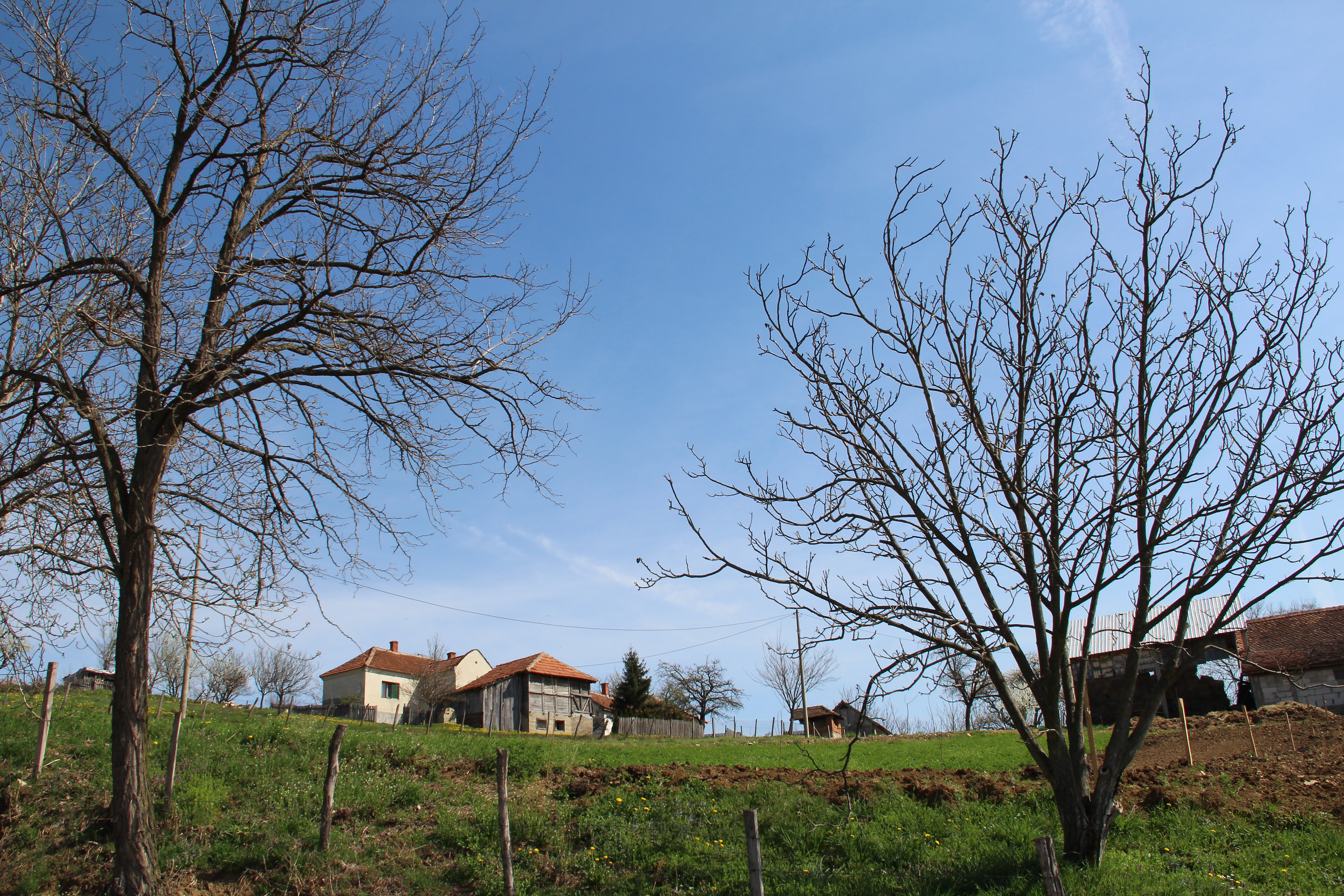
Lukavac - rural household
