= 2023 Belgrade City Assembly election =

- 17 December 2023
- All 110 seats in the City Assembly; 56 seats needed for a majority
- Turnout: 58.41 (▲0.56pp)
Electoral list	Leader	Vote %	Seats	+/–
AV–BNSDS	Aleksandar Šapić	39.93	49	+1
SPN	Vladimir Obradović, Dobrica Veselinović	35.39	43	+8
NADA	Vojislav Mihailović	6.13	7	0
MI–GIN	Aleksandar Jerković	5.50	6	New
SPS–JS–Zeleni	Toma Fila	4.86	5	−3
This lists parties that won seats. See the complete results below.
Results by municipality
Mayor before	Mayor after
Vacant (Note: Before the establishment of the Temporary Council of Belgrade on 30 October 2023, Aleksandar Šapić of the Serbian Progressive Party served as mayor of Belgrade.)	Vacant

The Belgrade City Assembly election was a local election held on 17 December 2023 to elect members of the City Assembly of Belgrade. The election became a focal point by opposition parties to oust Aleksandar Šapić, the mayor of Belgrade, leading to polarised election campaigns accompanied by mass protests.

Despite the growing popularity of opposition parties in the previous election that took place in April 2022, the Serbian Progressive Party (SNS) and the Socialist Party of Serbia (SPS) retained control of the Belgrade government with the support of a single independent councillor, who voted in favour of Šapić becoming mayor. Political friction continued as Šapić survived an unsuccessful attempt to remove him as mayor in October 2022, following the Belgrade school shooting and a mass murder near Mladenovac and Smederevo in May 2023. Anti-government protests were organised in Belgrade by opposition parties that lasted until November. In October, several opposition parties formed a joint coalition, named Serbia Against Violence (SPN). A new election was called, originally scheduled for 2026, after President of Serbia Aleksandar Vučić announced in September 2023 that it could be held at an earlier date. In response to the announcement, Šapić tendered his resignation and he ceased being mayor on 30 October 2023. The elections were held concurrently with the parliamentary, Vojvodina provincial, and local elections in 64 cities and municipalities in Serbia.

Candidates, during their election campaigns, concentrated on issues such as anti-corruption, environmental measures, improving public transportation, and expanding Belgrade's water supply network. The City Electoral Commission proclaimed 14 electoral lists for the election. Monitoring and non-governmental organisations reported electoral fraud on election day. SNS and SPS lost its coalition majority in the Assembly, while from the opposition, SPN and the National Democratic Alternative won 43 and 7 seats, respectively. The 2023 election resulted in a hung parliament. In the aftermath, mass protests took place until 30 December. Due to the failure to constitute the City Assembly, a snap election was triggered, in which SNS re-gained its parliamentary majority and Šapić returned as mayor.

== Background ==
In the 2022 Belgrade City Assembly election, the Serbian Progressive Party (SNS) won 48 seats, while the Socialist Party of Serbia–United Serbia coalition retained its 8 seats in the City Assembly. The election also saw the United for the Victory of Belgrade (UZPB) alliance winning 26 seats; the We Must alliance won 13 seats, while the National Democratic Alternative, Serbian Party Oathkeepers (SSZ), and Dveri also gained representation. Despite this, opposition parties won more votes than the government parties in the election; the Social Democratic Party– New Party coalition was short 0.14% of the popular vote to cross the 3% threshold. Shortly after the election, Dragan Đilas, the leader of the Party of Freedom and Justice (SSP), which was a part of the opposition UZPB alliance, met with Aleksandar Vučić, the president of Serbian Progressive Party, to discuss about the outcome of the election. This move received criticism from SSP's coalition partners, like the People's Party (Narodna) and Democratic Party (DS), which ultimately led to the dissolution of the UZPB.

After the negotiations on forming a local government, Vuk Stanić, a councillor-elect of the City Assembly, left the Movement for the Restoration of the Kingdom of Serbia, and voted in favour of Aleksandar Šapić of SNS becoming mayor in June 2022. Later in October 2022, the Ujedinjeni councillor group filed a proposal for the dismissal of Šapić, citing alleged illegal extension of his apartment at Bežanija. This proposal was also supported from Narodna, DS, Moramo, and Dveri, however it failed as only 44 members voiced their support of it. During this period, Marija Vukomirović and Stefan Jovanović, who were affiliated with SSZ, left the party, stating their disapproval of the party's leader, Milica Đurđević Stamenkovski. Stanić, Vukomirović, and Jovanović defected to SNS in February 2023.

=== 2023 protests ===
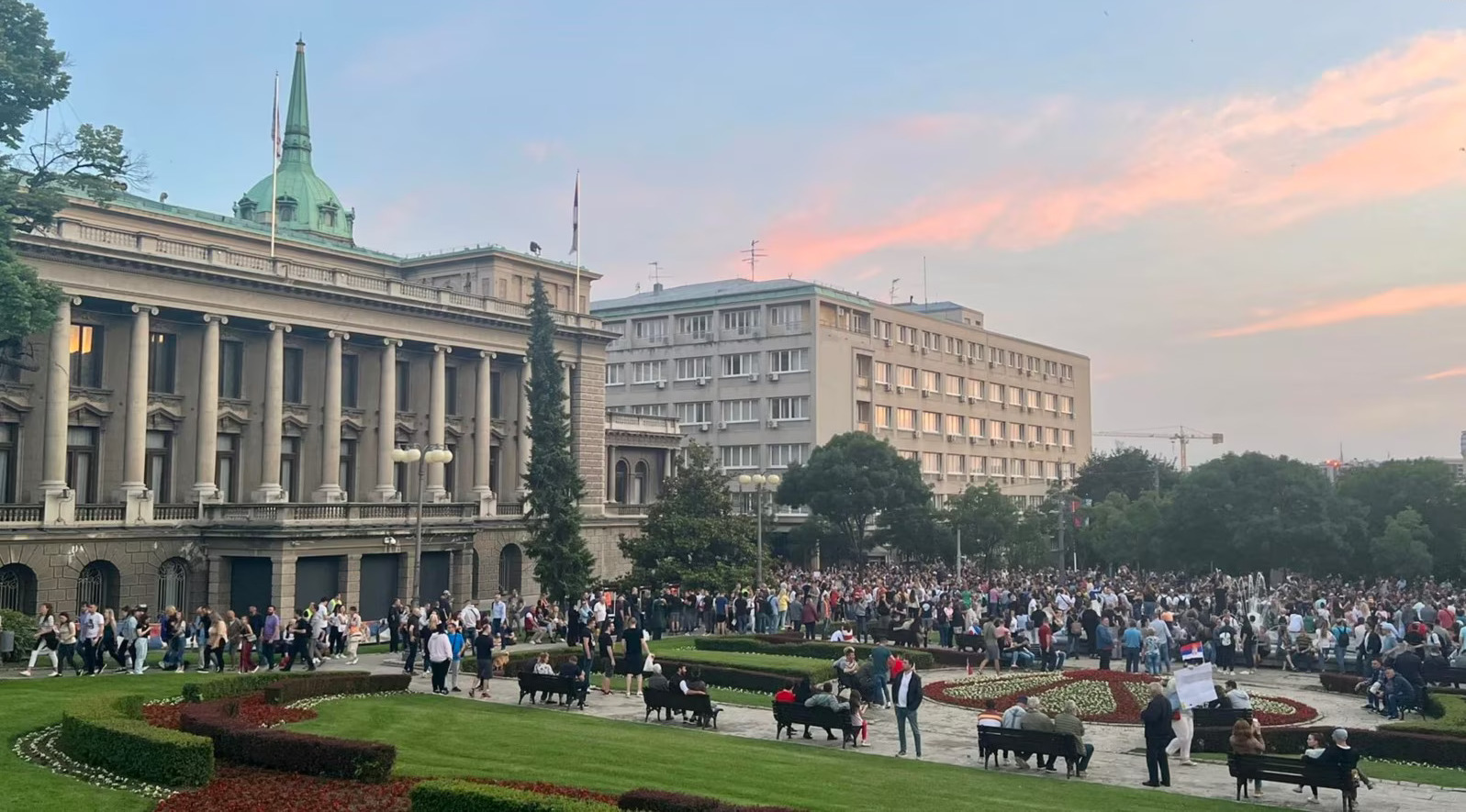
Demonstrators protesting next to the City Assembly of Belgrade

In May 2023, the Belgrade school shooting and a mass murder near Mladenovac and Smederevo occurred. The government of Serbia responded by adopting stricter regulations on gun ownership and deploying 1,200 police officers to schools. However, its response was criticised, particularly due to the statement of Branko Ružić, the minister of education, who said that "a cancerous, pernicious influence of the Internet, video games, and so-called Western values, is evident" (Serbian: evidentan je kancerogen, poguban uticaj interneta video igrica, takozvanih zapadnih vrednosti) in the shooting, and Ana Brnabić, the prime minister of Serbia, who said that the "system did not fail" (Serbian: sistem nije zakazao) when responding to the claims that the government could have stopped the shootings.

Mass protests known as Serbia Against Violence began on 8 May in Belgrade. Tens of thousands attended the protests. Despite being organised by the SSP, DS, Narodna, Do not let Belgrade drown (NDB), and Together (Zajedno) opposition parties, no party signs were reported to be seen at the protests. In response to the Serbia Against Violence protests, Vučić held an SNS-organised gathering on 26 May in Belgrade. The protests ended in early November.

== Electoral system ==
Local elections in Belgrade are held under a proportional representation system. Eligible voters vote for electoral lists, on which the registered candidates are present. An electoral list could be submitted by a registered political party, a coalition of political parties, or a citizens' group. The number of valid signatures needed to be collected to take part in the election varies by the number of eligible voters in that municipality. At least 40% of candidates on electoral lists must be female. The electoral list is submitted by its chosen ballot representative, who does not have to be present on its electoral list. An electoral list could be declined, after which those who had submitted can fix the deficiencies in a span of 48 hours, or rejected, if the person is not authorised to nominate candidates. The name and date of the election, the names of the electoral lists and its ballot representatives, and information on how to vote are only present on the voting ballot.

The City of Belgrade Electoral Commission (GIK) and polling boards oversee the election. Seats are allocated with an electoral threshold of 3% of all votes cast, however, if no electoral list wins 3% of all votes cast, then all electoral lists that received votes can participate in the distribution of seats. The seats are distributed by electoral lists in proportion to the number of votes received, while the number of seats belonging to electoral lists is determined by applying the highest quotient system. The seats are distributed by dividing the total number of votes received by the electoral list participating in the distribution of seats by each number from one to the number of councillors the City Assembly has. The obtained quotients are classified by size so that the electoral list has as many mandates as it has its quotients among the highest quotients of all the electoral lists participating in the distribution. If two or more electoral lists receive the same quotients on the basis of which the seat is distributed, the electoral list that received the greater number of votes has priority. The seats in the City Assembly are awarded to the candidates to their order on the electoral list, starting with the first candidate from an electoral list. When the councillors of the City Assembly are sworn in, they, in turn, elect the mayor.

Any local election, whether it is a municipal or a City Assembly election, is called by the president of the National Assembly, who also has to announce its date. Eligible voters had to be a Serbian citizen, reside in Serbia, and be at least 18 years old. A voter could only vote in the municipality of their residence. An election silence begins two days before the scheduled election, meaning that no opinion polls, presentation of candidates and their programmes, or invitation to vote in the election can be published or take place.

=== Voter manipulation allegations ===
Miroslav Aleksić, the president of the People's Movement of Serbia (NPS), alleged in October 2023 that between 300 and 500 citizens daily fictitiously changed their home address because of the elections in Belgrade, accusing the local government of being involved in the process. Ana Gođevac, a SSP councillor, also said that between 21 September and 24 October 2023, the number of registered voters in Vračar increased by 356 and that the same pattern was noticed in other municipalities of Belgrade. Nikola Jovanović, director of the Centre for Local Self-Management, reported in late October 2023 that the number of registered voters increased by 2,349 between July and October 2023, and by 9,590 since the 2022 Belgrade City Assembly election. Jovanović noted that the number of registered voters has significantly increased in the municipalities of Vračar, Zvezdara, Zemun, and Palilula, despite Belgrade's population being in decline since 2021, alleging potential "pre-election voter manipulation" (Serbian: predizborni inženjering). The Ministry of Internal Affairs published the residence data for Belgrade in mid November due to the allegations.

=== Election date ===
At the Đilas–Vučić meeting in April 2022, Đilas demanded snap elections be held in Belgrade due to the inconclusive results of the 2022 election. Vučić responded by saying that the elections could be held in December 2022 or March 2023. In April 2023, newspaper Danas reported that snap parliamentary elections, local elections, Vojvodina provincial election, and the Belgrade City Assembly election could be held as early as November 2023. At a press conference in August 2023, Vučić said that early Belgrade City Assembly elections could be held in December 2023 or early 2024, while in September 2023, Vučić and Šapić announced that they could be held on 17 December 2023. Šapić resigned as mayor on 29 September, triggering a 30-day limit to appoint a new mayor. Considering that a new mayor was not appointed, an election had to be called. The government of Serbia sent a proposal to dissolve the City Assembly of Belgrade and constitute the Temporary Council of Belgrade on 30 October. Vladimir Orlić, the president of the National Assembly of Serbia, called the election on 1 November for 17 December.

The Temporary Council of Belgrade was constituted on 30 October, with Šapić serving as the president of the body, while Aleksandar Mirković, Nikola Nikodijević, Vladimir Obradović, and Dobrica Veselinović served as its members. Besides Šapić ceased being mayor, all local self-government bodies and executive bodies ceased to work until the election of a new mayor.

=== Political parties ===
The table below lists political parties represented in the City Assembly of Belgrade after the 2022 election.

Name	Ideology	Political position	Leader	2022 result	
Name	Ideology	Political position	Leader	Votes (%)	Seats
SNS–led coalition	Populism	Big tent	Aleksandar Šapić	38.83%	48 / 110
United for the Victory of Belgrade	Anti-corruption	Centre	Vladeta Janković	21.78%	26 / 110
We Must	Green politics	Centre-left to left-wing	Dobrica Veselinović	11.04%	13 / 110
SPS–JS–ZS	Populism	Big tent	Toma Fila	7.14%	8 / 110
National Democratic Alternative	National conservatism	Right-wing	Vojislav Mihailović	6.44%	7 / 110
Serbian Party Oathkeepers	Ultranationalism	Far-right	Milica Đurđević; Stamenkovski	3.57%	4 / 110
Dveri–POKS	Serbian nationalism	Right-wing to far-right	Boško Obradović	3.44%	4 / 110

=== Pre-election composition ===
Pre-election councillor composition
Groups	Parties	Cllrs	
Groups	Parties	Seats	Total
Aleksandar Vučić – Together We Can Do Everything	SNS	39	51
Aleksandar Vučić – Together We Can Do Everything	PUPS	3	51
Aleksandar Vučić – Together We Can Do Everything	SDPS	2	51
Aleksandar Vučić – Together We Can Do Everything	PSS–BK	2	51
Aleksandar Vučić – Together We Can Do Everything	SPO	1	51
Aleksandar Vučić – Together We Can Do Everything	SNP	1	51
Aleksandar Vučić – Together We Can Do Everything	PS	1	51
Aleksandar Vučić – Together We Can Do Everything	VMSZ/SVM	1	51
Aleksandar Vučić – Together We Can Do Everything	Samostalna	1	51
We Must – For a Good City – Do not let Belgrade drown	ZLF	10	13
We Must – For a Good City – Do not let Belgrade drown	Together	3	13
Forward to Europe – SSP, PSG, Reversal, Sloga	SSP	6	11
Forward to Europe – SSP, PSG, Reversal, Sloga	PSG	3	11
Forward to Europe – SSP, PSG, Reversal, Sloga	PZP	1	11
Forward to Europe – SSP, PSG, Reversal, Sloga	USS Sloga	1	11
BeDem – Democratic Party	DS	9	9
Ivica Dačić – SPS–JS	SPS	7	8
Ivica Dačić – SPS–JS	JS	1	8
NADA – For Belgrade – New DSS, POKS	NDSS	4	6
NADA – For Belgrade – New DSS, POKS	POKS	2	6
People's Movement of Serbia – New Face of Serbia	NPS	4	5
People's Movement of Serbia – New Face of Serbia	NLS	1	5
Serbian Movement Dveri – Serbian Party Oathkeepers – Patriotic Bloc	Dveri	3	5
Serbian Movement Dveri – Serbian Party Oathkeepers – Patriotic Bloc	SSZ	2	5
Cllrs not members of groups	Narodna	2	2

== Pre-election activities ==
=== Opposition parties ===
Although the We Must alliance ceased to exist on national level after the 2022 elections, its members continued cooperating in the City Assembly of Belgrade under the "For a Good City" group. Together, with Aleksandar Jovanović Ćuta, Biljana Stojković, and Nebojša Zelenović as its co-presidents, was formed in June 2022 as a merger of Together for Serbia, Ecological Uprising, and Assembly of Free Serbia. Solidarity, which was also affiliated with the We Must alliance, merged into Together in January 2023. NDB announced in late June 2022 that it had adopted a platform to work on becoming a registered party, while it began collecting signatures in May 2023. The party also announced that it would rename itself to Green–Left Front (ZLF), which was formalised in July 2023.

Within Narodna, a dispute between its president Vuk Jeremić and vice-president Aleksić began in June 2023. Aleksić was eventually removed from the position of the party's executive board in July 2023; he then publicly acknowledged the conflict between him and Jeremić. Although a leadership election was scheduled for October 2023, Aleksić left Narodna and reformed NPS in August 2023. Four Narodna councillors also joined Aleksić's NPS and subsequently formed a group in the City Assembly of Belgrade. This decision left Narodna only with two councillors, ultimately losing its status as a group in the City Assembly of Belgrade. In September 2023, Dveri and SSZ formed a joint group which was formalised in October as the National Gathering.

The Ujedinjeni group changed its name to Forward to Europe (PE) in July 2023.

=== Election alliances ===
Like for the parliamentary elections, opposition parties organising the Serbia Against Violence protests have discussed creating a joint electoral list for the Belgrade City Assembly election. Radomir Lazović and Dobrica Veselinović from ZLF have expressed their support for creating a joint electoral list; Veselinović, who participated in talks about forming a joint electoral list for the Belgrade City Assembly election, said that all organisers "think it is the best solution" to participate on a joint list. Dragan Đilas, the president of SSP and former mayor of Belgrade, was also in favour of creating a joint list. The agreement between the parties was reached on 26 October, with Vladimir Obradović as their mayoral candidate. A day later, the coalition was formalised and presented to the public as Serbia Against Violence.

== Electoral lists ==
With the dissolution of the City Assembly of Belgrade and a call for elections to be held on 17 December, the deadline to submit electoral lists was set for 26 November. The collective electoral list was published by GIK on 1 December. The following table includes electoral lists that were confirmed by GIK and that took part in the 2023 Belgrade City Assembly election.

^{M} — National minority list

#	Ballot name	Ballot carrier	Main ideology	Political position	Note
1	Aleksandar Vučić – Belgrade Must Not Stop; SNS, SDPS, PS, PUPS, SNP, NSS, USS, SRS, VMSZ/SVM	Aleksandar Šapić	Populism	Big tent	
2	Ivica Dačić – Prime Minister of Serbia, Toma Fila – Mayor of Belgrade; SPS, JS, ZS	Toma Fila	Populism	Big tent	
3	Serbia Against Violence – Dobrica Veselinović – prof. dr Vladimir Obradović; SSP, NPS, ZLF, DS, Zajedno, SRCE, EU, PSG, NLS, PZP, USS Sloga, Fatherland, GDP, PR/RP	Mila Popović	Anti-corruption	Big tent	
4	Milica Đurđević Stamenkovski – Boško Obradović – National Gathering – State-Building Force – Serbian Party Oathkeepers – Serbian Movement Dveri; SSZ, Dveri	Ratko Ristić	Ultranationalism	Far-right	
5	Dr Miloš Jovanović – NADA for Belgrade – Serbian coalition NADA – National Democratic Alternative – New Democratic Party of Serbia (New DSS) – Movement for the Restoration of the Kingdom of Serbia (POKS) – Vojislav Mihailović; NDSS, POKS	Vojislav Mihailović	National conservatism	Right-wing	
6	Russian Party – Slobodan Nikolić; RS	Željko Pantić	Russophilia	Right-wing	^{M}
7	People's Party – Safe Choice. Serious People – Vuk Jeremić, Vladimir Gajić, dr Sanda Rašković Ivić, Siniša Kovačević, Marina Lipovac Tanasković; Narodna	Vladimir Gajić	Conservatism	Right-wing	
8	For the Army to Return to Kosovo – Miša Vacić; SD (Note: Vacić formally took part in the elections under the "For the Army to Return to Kosovo" citizens group.)	Miša Vacić	Ultranationalism	Far-right	
9	Saša Radulović (Enough is Enough – DJB) – Duško Vujošević, Boris Tadić (Social Democratic Party – SDS) – Ana Pejić (Stolen Babies) – Good Morning Belgrade; DJB, SDS, OBAP	Dejan Žujović	Anti-Ohrid Agreement		
10	Usame Zukorlić – Change is Victory – Justice and Reconciliation Party; SPP	Sanela Plojović	Minority politics		^{M}
11	Serbia in the West – Zoran Vuletić – Nemanja Milošević – Experts Should Have A Say – Vladimir Kovačević; Nova–D2SP, GDF, Libdem, Glas	Vladimir Kovačević	Pro-Europeanism	Centre	
12	"Dad, This is for You" – Petar Đurić; ĆOJZT	Petar Đurić	Liberalism	Centre	
13	We–The Voice from the People, Aleksandar Jerković; MI–GIN	Branimir Nestorović	Russophilia	Right-wing	
14	Čedomir Jovanović – It Must Be Different; LDP (Note: Candidates on Jovanović's list formally took part under the "Čedomir Jovanović – It Must Be Different" citizens group.)	Čedomir Jovanović	Liberalism	Centre	

== Campaign ==
Dušan Vučićević, an associate professor at the Faculty of Political Sciences of the University of Belgrade, said that opposition parties could perform well in municipalities like Savski Venac, Vračar, and Stari Grad. Srećko Mihailović from Demostat, a research and publishing non-governmental organisation, also said that opposition parties could receive an even better result in comparison with the 2022 election. Đorđe Vukadinović of Nova srpska politička misao also said that opposition parties could perform well in New Belgrade.

Journalist Milenko Vasović said in November, that the 2023 election "could still deliver an upset." Dejan Milenković, a professor at the Faculty of Political Sciences, also highlighted the significance of the election. BBC News also reported that in case of an opposition victory, the Belgrade election could affect the local elections in 2024. Political scientist Boban Stojanović said that "the 2023 elections are even more uncertain than the previous ones, especially when it comes to Belgrade" (Serbian: predstojeći izbori neizvesniji nego prethodni, posebno kada je reč o Beogradu).

=== Slogans ===
Party/coalition	Original slogan	English translation	Refs
Dad, This is for You	Podrži sebe – Ćale ovo je za tebe	Support yourself – Dad this is for you	
National Democratic Alternative	Promene sad!	Changes now!	
People's Party	Siguran izbor. Ozbiljni ljudi	Safe choice. Serious people	
Serbia Against Violence	Promena je počela!	Change has begun!	
Serbian Radical Party	Otadžbina Srbija. Majka Rusija	Fatherland Serbia. Mother Russia	
SDS–DJB–OBAP	Dobro jutro Srbijo!	Good morning Serbia!	
SNS coalition	Beograd ne sme da stane	Belgrade must not stop	
SPS–JS–ZS	Ivica Dačić – premijer Srbije, Toma Fila – gradonačelnik Beograda	Ivica Dačić – Prime Minister of Serbia, Toma Fila – Mayor of Belgrade	

=== Debates ===
2023 Belgrade City Assembly election debates
Date	Time	Organisers	P Present A Absent invitee N Non-invitee						
Date	Time	Organisers	SNS	SPS	SPN	NO	NADA	Narodna	Refs
30 Nov	9:00 pm	RTS	P Aleksandar Šapić	P Nikola Nikodijević	P Vladimir Obradović	P Ratko Ristić	N	N	
13 Dec	9:00 pm	N1	A	A	P Mila Popović	P Ratko Ristić	P Predrag Marsenić	P Vladimir Gajić	

=== Party campaigns ===
==== Serbian Progressive Party ====
In an interview in late October 2023, Šapić called the unification of parties into SPN a demented move. The Serbian Radical Party, led by Vojislav Šešelj, announced that it would contest the Belgrade City Assembly elections with SNS. This announcement caused attention in national media. SNS began collecting signatures for its electoral list once the election was called. They submitted it to GIK a day later. GIK confirmed their list on 3 November. Šapić campaigned on introducing a water system for the Grocka municipality of Belgrade.

Amidst the campaign, Šapić's associate Aleksandra Čamagić was mentioned in Balkan Investigative Reporting Network's corruption report in late November, where it reported that Čamagić embezzled approximately €5,000,000 during her tenure as Assistant Minister to the Ministry of Family Welfare and Demography. In response to the report, Veselinović and Obradović from the Temporary Council sent a request for her dismissal, while Šapić criticised the report. On 5 December, Čamagić's mandate as city secretary was extended.

While announcing the construction of a new kindergarten and elementary school on 2 December, Šapić was involved in a verbal incident with journalist Dušan Čavić. A day later, Šapić presented another construction project in Višnjička Banja, where he mispresented the picture of the future school with that of photo of a Salt Lake City school in the United States.

==== Socialist Party of Serbia ====
The Socialist Party of Serbia (SPS), United Serbia, and Greens of Serbia signed a coalition agreement on 2 November 2023. They announced Toma Fila as their mayoral candidate. The SPS-led coalition submitted its list to GIK on 2 November, submitting over 4,000 signatures. Fila campaigned on pensioners' interests, improving the representation of women in the executive and legislative branches of the local government, and even development of all parts of Belgrade. Fila has also said that as mayor of Belgrade, he would advocate for the strengthening of workers' rights. Žarko Dronjak of SPS said that the SPS coalition supports the construction of the Belgrade Metro.

==== Serbia Against Violence ====
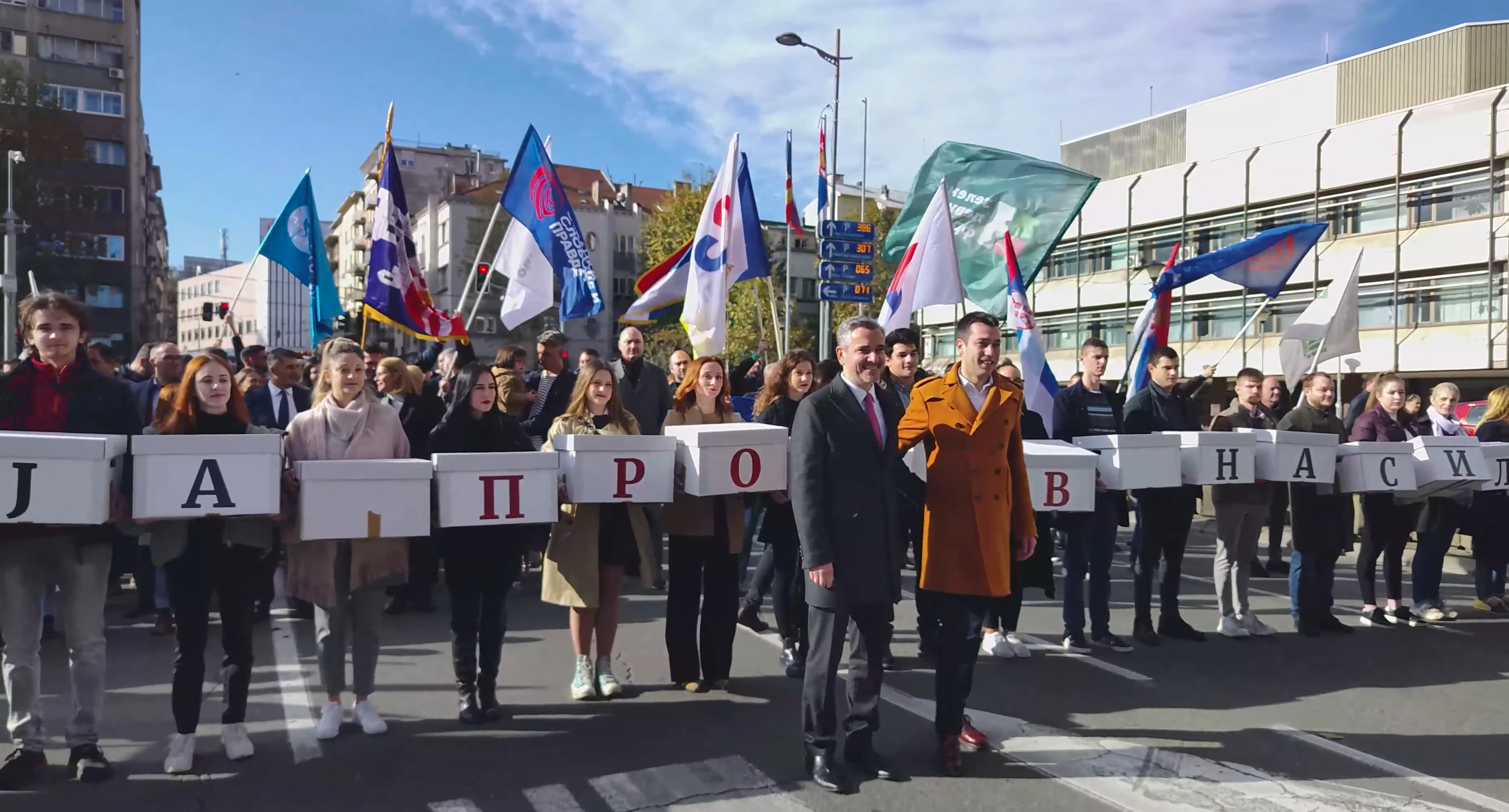
Serbia Against Violence representatives submitting their list on 12 November

SPN submitted its electoral list to GIK on 12 November. Veselinović named nonpolarised politics, increasing the number of available kindergartens, preserving city's landscape and environment, and improving Belgrade's traffic as some of their main issues. GIK confirmed their list on 13 November.

SPN campaigned on opposing the destruction of the Belgrade Fair complex and the Old Sava Bridge. Đorđe Miketić, a representative of Together in the National Assembly of Serbia and a candidate for the City Assembly of Belgrade, called for an investigation of assets and cash flows of Šapić, saying that "it remains unknown from which sources mayor Šapić can finance the rental of an apartment in a neighbourhood where the average monthly rent is €3,000" (Serbian: ostaje nepoznato i iz kojih izvora gradonačelnik Šapić može da finansira iznajmljivanje stana u kvartu gde prosečna cena mesečnog zakupa iznosi 3.000 evra), considering that Šapić's salary as mayor was €1,186. The mayoral candidate of SPN, Vladimir Obradović, named traffic problems, local government organising, transparency, air pollution, public security, and environment as key issues. Obradović also said that SPN would form a Fund for Investment in Agriculture to invest in locally produced fruit, protective nets, and storage capacities.

Miketić became a target of attacks by Vučić in late November 2023; Vučić called Miketić a "human shame" (Serbian: ljudska sramota). On 27 November, Miketić revealed that an unknown sender sent him threats and Miketić's own intimate photo. Miketić accused the Security Intelligence Agency (BIA) of being behind the threats. In response, BIA denied the claims, declined to investigate the threats, and demanded Miketić release public information about the intimate photo. Miketić's sex tape was leaked on social media on 29 November, with Miketić confirming its authenticity. Earlier in January 2022, Miketić said that his apartment was raided and his hard disks and phones were stolen. The pro-government TV Pink, a television channel with national frequency, broadcast the sex tape on its channel on 1 December. Following the broadcast on the same day, Obradović announced that Miketić would leave the coalition's campaign team. Miketić also criticised Dragan J. Vučićević, the editor of the pro-government Informer tabloid newspaper, and Nebojša Krstić, a pro-government political commentator.

==== National Democratic Alternative ====
Vladimir Štimac, a professional basketball player, also announced that he could take part in the elections. A supporter of cryptocurrency and anti-discrimination politics, Štimac was also previously involved in a conflict with the Milenijum tim company which retains close relations with SNS. Štimac confirmed his candidacy once the election was called. Štimac signed an agreement with NADA on 3 November, announcing that he would run on their electoral list. NADA submitted its list to GIK on 12 November and GIK confirmed it a day later. Štimac said that public transport, car parkings, and air pollution would be the coalition's main issues if they had become part of the next local government.

==== National Gathering ====
SSZ and Dveri submitted its list to GIK on 12 November. They named professor Ratko Ristić as their mayoral candidate. Ristić has emphasised his opposition to corruption and air pollution, as well as support for improving the public transport and youth and elderly rights in his speech on 12 November. GIK confirmed their list on 13 November. Later, in an interview with Demostat, Ristić said that, in order to fix traffic jams, the government should invest more in new public vehicles, increase the number of drivers, lower the amount of administrative workers, and buy more trams. Ristić also said that he supports the expansion of green areas in Belgrade and reconstruction of unused public buildings into kindergartens.

==== People's Party ====
Narodna submitted its electoral list on 21 November, announcing Vladimir Gajić as its mayoral candidate. Gajić has said that he would campaign on issues such as corruption, transport, and air pollution. GIK confirmed their electoral list on 23 November. In an interview with Demostat, Gajić emphasised his support for creating more public transport lanes and roundabouts to lower the number of traffic jams, building more kindergartens, and investing in new bus vehicles.

==== DJB–SDS ====
The coalition composed of Enough is Enough, Social Democratic Party, and Stolen Babies movement submitted their electoral list on 23 November under the name Good Morning Belgrade. They named pulmonologist Dejan Žujović as their mayoral candidate. GIK confirmed their electoral list on 25 November.

==== For the Army to Return to Kosovo ====
Miša Vacić's citizens group "For the Army to Return to Kosovo" electoral list was accepted by GIK on 24 November. His electoral list only had 15 candidates. Zoran Alimpić, a member of GIK, reported that opposition members of GIK complained about the electoral list's documentation, alleging that the citizens group had falsified signatures of support. As mayor of Belgrade, Vacić said that he would request Belgrade to become twin cities with cities he sees have positive relations with the Serbian people, naming Donetsk, Damascus, Caracas, Pyongyang, and Grozny as some of the cities.

==== Russian Party ====
The electoral list of the Russian Party, a political party led by Slobodan Nikolić that advocates closer ties with Russia, was confirmed by GIK on 15 November. Nikolić, a resident of Šabac, was not a candidate, and the list was instead led by Željko Pantić. BBC News also described the Russian Party as socially conservative, Eurosceptic, and anti-globalist. Lawyer Sofija Mandić and Alimpić alleged that, as members of the extended composition of GIK, the Russian Party electoral list had irregularities, listing incorrectly validated signatures as one of them. The proposal to reject their list was rejected by GIK. Despite being a registered Russian minority party, none of its candidates were Russian.

==== Others ====
Rade Basta's European Way Movement (PEP) submitted its electoral list on 22 November. Basta was announced as the ballot holder, while businessman Zoran Ilić was announced as PEP's mayoral candidate. Milan Lešnjak, a former footballer, and Nenad Milić, a former government official, were also announced as candidates on its electoral list. Ilić said that he would campaign on supporting minority rights and pro-European values to Belgrade. Despite Basta not being a Bunjevac, PEP submitted its electoral list under two Bunjevci minority parties, one of which was Alliance of Bačka Bunjevci, due to minority parties only needing to collect 1,500 signatures to take part in the election. Several criminal charges were filed against the electoral list due to allegedly falsifying the signatures of support. GIK rejected PEP's electoral list on 23 November due to having falsified signatures of support. Alimpić alleged that the electoral list was filed for the government to have a majority in the GIK. On 25 November, GIK again rejected the PEP's electoral list. In response to the rejection, PEP submitted an unssucessful appeal to the Higher Court in belgrade to overturn GIK's decision.

The electoral lists of the Justice and Reconciliation Party and Serbia in the West, a political coalition consisting of the New Party–D2SP, Civic Democratic Forum, Liberals and Democrats, and Glas, and the citizens group "Dad, This is for You" were confirmed by GIK on 26 November. On the same day, the We–The Voice from the People (MI–GIN) citizens group of conspiracy theorist Branimir Nestorović submitted their list. The electoral lists of MI–GIN and Liberal Democratic Party were accepted by GIK on 27 November.

== Opinion polls ==
According to an opinion poll that was conducted by Demostat in December 2022, 50% of the voters would vote for government parties, 33% of the voters would vote for centrist and left-leaning opposition parties, while 17% of the voters would vote for opposition parties that lean to the right. The graph below showcases major parties and alliances in opinion polls from the 2022 Belgrade City Assembly election to 17 December 2023.

Local regression chart of poll results from 3 April 2022 to 17 December 2023

Polling firm	Date of publishment	Sample size	SNS–led coalition	SPS–JS	SPN						NADA		NO		Narodna	Others	Lead
Polling firm	Date of publishment	Sample size	SNS–led coalition	SPS–JS	SSP	PSG	DS	Together	NDB/ZLF	SRCE	NDSS	POKS	SSZ	Dveri	Narodna	Others	Lead
2023 election	17 December	–	39.9	4.9	35.4						6.1		2.6		2.1	9.0	4.4
OFID	14 December 2023	1,200	35.7	6.3	39.1						5.9		4.6		1.2	7.2 (Note: DJS: 2.6%, Mi–GIN: 2.4%, Others: 2.2%.)	3.4
Stata	5 July 2023	830	31.5	6.3	16.2	4.1	–	4.8	10.1	5.8	5.3	–	4.1	4.4	2.9	4.5	15.3
ŠSM	5 April 2023	?	37.9	5.5	6.3	4.8	1.2	4.3	7.7	5.6	6.7	1.8	3.0	2.8	3.1	9.2 (Note: DJB: 3.2%, SDS: 0.8%, ZS: 0.5%, GDF: 0.4%, SRS: 0.1%, Minority parties: 0.2%, Blank vote: 4.0%.)	30.2
NSPM	24 February 2023	900	37.8	9.0	6.1	–	2.4	4.7	2.5	4.9	5.8	1.0	3.0	3.7	2.7	16.4 (Note: SRS: 2.0%, SDS: 1.6%, Others: 4.3%, while 8.5% of respondents stated that they would vote for the opposition.)	32.7
ŠSM	22 February 2023	?	36.8	7.0	8.9	3.3	2.9	6.3	4.1	6.9	3.3	2.6	2.8	4.3	3.3	9.2 (Note: DJB: 1.6%, GDF: 0.9%, ZS: 0.7%, SDS: 0.6%, LSV: 0.2%, LDP: 0.1%, SRS: 0.00%, Minority parties: 1.1%, Blank vote: 2.2%.)	35.6
2022 election	3 April 2022	–	38.8	7.1	21.8 (Note: As part of the United for the Victory of Belgrade alliance.)			11.0		–	6.4 (Note: DSS took part with Vojislav Mihailović-led faction of POKS in the 2022 parliamentary election. Mihailović was legally recognised as the president of POKS in July 2022.)		3.6	3.4 (Note: Dveri took part with Žika Gojković-led faction of POKS in the 2022 parliamentary election.)	21.8	7.9	17.0

=== Scenario polls ===
The Stata opinion poll, which was published on 5 July 2023, also showed that SNS, SPS, and its allies would win 38.4% of the popular vote if they had to participate under a joint electoral list, while a hypothetical alliance of those who organised the Serbia Against Violence protests, which includes SSP, Narodna, DS, PSG, NDB/ZLF, and Together, would win 44.6% of the popular vote and a joint alliance of SSZ, Dveri, NDSS, and POKS would win 10.2% of the popular vote.

Polling firm	Date of publishment	Sample size	SNS–SPS, et al.	SPN	NADA–Dveri–SSZ	Others	Lead
CRTA	16 October 2023	806	38.0	51.0	11.0	0.0	13.0
Stata	5 July 2023	830	38.4	44.6	10.2	6.8 (Note: Others: 1.4%, Undecided: 5.4%.)	6.2

== Conduct ==
Monitoring and non-governmental organisations, such as CeSID and CRTA, reported that the election day was marked with electoral fraud. By 9:00, CeSID reported that there were irregularities at New Belgrade and Zemun, while Kreni-Promeni reported the bulgarian train vote-rigging method at voting stations in New Belgrade. Throughout the rest of the election day, CeSID reported irregularities at Vračar and Grocka. In its 18 December report, CRTA concluded that due to the irregularities, the election results for the first time do not express the will of the citizens.

Voters from Republika Srpska were also driven to the Štark Arena in Belgrade. Despite Štark Arena not being a voting station, it served as a redirect station towards official voting stations in Belgrade. The security at the Štark Arena, however, did not allow members of RIK to enter the building. Brnabić said that she did not see what was irregular or illegal with Štark Arena serving as a redirect station for voters from Republika Srpska. Miodrag Jovanović, a professor at the Faculty of Law of the University of Belgrade, said that in regards to the voters of Republika Srpska voting in the Belgrade City Assembly election, "it is illegal for someone to have a residence where he does not live."

CRTA later reported that at least at 14% of voting stations in Belgrade, non-Belgrade citizens voted in the Belgrade City Assembly elections. Besides the voters from Republika Srpska, it was reported that voters from Croatia and Kosovo, and cities in Serbia such as Pančevo, Valjevo, Čačak, Aranđelovac, Smederevo, Vršac, and Novi Sad were sent to Belgrade vote illegally in the Belgrade City Assembly elections. In response to their report, Brnabić accused the opposition and CRTA of "destabilising Serbia and its constitutional order."

Stefan Schennach, the chief of the delegation of PACE that monitored the elections, said that the Belgrade City Assembly election was not fair and that "the victory in Belgrade was stolen from the opposition." In the aftermath of the elections, Office for Democratic Institutions and Human Rights published a report in which it concluded that various irregularities took place, such as vote buying, the Bulgarian train, and group voting.

== Results ==
There were 1,613,369 citizens in total who had the right to vote in the 2023 Belgrade City Assembly election. Voters were able to vote at 1,180 voting stations in Belgrade, an increase of 10 in comparison with the 2022 election. Elections were repeated at two voting stations.

After the voting stations were closed, CeSID/Ipsos and CRTA were the first to report their projections of the results. According to the projection from CeSID/Ipsos, SNS won 38% of popular vote and 48 seats in the City Assembly, while SPN won 35% of popular vote and 43 seats. NADA won 6% of popular vote and 7 seats, while Nestorović's MI–GIN also unexpectedly crossed the threshold, winning 5.3% of popular vote and 6 seats in the Assembly. SPS suffered from a decrease in popularity, winning 4.8% of popular vote and 6 seats.

Official results were published by GIK on 3 January 2024. SPN won the most votes in Belgrade municipalities of New Belgrade, Vračar, Voždovac, Zvezdara, Savski Venac, and Stari Grad, while SNS won the most votes in municipalities of Grocka, Zemun, Lazarevac, Mladenovac, Palilula, Obrenovac, Rakovica, Sopot, Surčin, Čukarica, and Barajevo.

Electoral list	Votes	%	+/–	Seats	+/–
Belgrade Must Not Stop	367,239	39.93	+1.10	49	+1
Serbia Against Violence	325,429	35.39	+2.57	43	+8
National Democratic Alternative	56,415	6.13	–0.31	7	0
We–The Voice from the People	50,535	5.50	New	6	New
SPS–JS–ZS	44,671	4.86	–2.28	5	–3
National Gathering	24,213	2.63	New	0	–7
People's Party	19,141	2.08	New	0	–5
Good Morning Belgrade	14,695	1.60	–3.50	0	0
Dad, This is for You	4,385	0.48	New	0	New
Russian Party	3,692	0.40	New	0	New
It Must Be Different	2,901	0.32	New	0	New
For the Army to Return to Kosovo	2,531	0.28	New	0	New
Nova–D2SP–GDF–Libdem–Glas	2,324	0.25	New	0	New
Justice and Reconciliation Party	1,430	0.16	New	0	New
Total	919,601	100.00	–	110	0
Valid votes	919,601	97.86			
Invalid/blank votes	20,109	2.14			
Total votes	939,710	100.00			
Registered voters/turnout	1,613,369	58.41			
Source: City Election Commission

=== By municipality ===
Municipality	Registered voters	Turnout	AV–BNSDS	SPN	NADA	MI–GIN	SPS–JS	Others	Lead
Barajevo	23,745	56.91	52.01	19.79	4.87	4.99	6.99	11.35	32.22
Voždovac	163,343	56.83	36.24	37.04	6.63	5.55	4.45	10.10	0.80
Vračar	64,205	61.04	27.61	49.22	5.99	4.47	3.66	9.05	21.62
Grocka	73,503	55.14	49.63	21.41	5.90	4.42	7.44	11.20	28.22
Zvezdara	163,528	55.78	33.09	40.54	6.36	5.27	4.39	10.35	7.45
Zemun	170,188	58.57	42.70	32.31	5.65	5.34	4.25	9.76	10.39
Lazarevac	50,080	66.65	42.19	25.49	6.81	4.78	7.41	13.32	16.70
Mladenovac	45,280	62.56	52.08	20.90	4.33	4.03	6.59	12.06	31.18
New Belgrade	204,660	61.61	33.71	41.13	6.22	5.42	3.79	9.73	7.41
Obrenovac	64,468	58.90	50.85	20.42	4.62	7.07	6.32	10.72	30.43
Palilula	174,559	53.57	39.33	33.58	5.61	5.47	4.52	11.50	5.75
Rakovica	99,733	59.97	39.01	33.69	6.49	5.64	4.94	10.23	5.32
Savski Venac	40,229	57.04	31.24	44.71	5.74	5.02	3.87	9.40	13.47
Sopot	17,411	54.60	53.69	16.92	4.31	4.26	7.49	13.33	36.76
Stari Grad	53,910	56.48	25.61	50.61	5.43	5.29	3.40	9.66	24.99
Surčin	40,087	61.38	56.96	17.85	4.72	5.38	4.84	10.25	39.10
Čukarica	164,440	60.08	38.50	34.37	6.75	5.87	4.44	10.06	4.13
Total	1,613,369	58.41	39.93	35.39	6.13	5.50	4.86	8.19	4.54
Source: City Electoral Commission

== Aftermath ==
=== Protests ===
Due to the reported election irregularities, SPN announced that it would reject the results, claiming that the election was not fair. Aleksić claimed that over 40,000 ID cards were issued for voters who did not live in Belgrade in order for them to gain the right to vote in the Belgrade City Assembly election. SPN called for the annulment of the results. A day after the election, a mass protest was organised outside the Republic Electoral Commission by SPN. At the protest, Marinika Tepić from SPN announced that she would go on a hunger strike until the election results are annulled. Tepić was later joined by Jelena Milošević, Danijela Grujić, Janko Veselinović, Željko Veselinović, Branko Miljuš, and Dušan Nikezić in the hunger strike.

At the 24 December protest, protesters tried to storm the building of the City Assembly of Belgrade. Vučić issued an urgent statement in response to the attempt to storm the building of the City Assembly of Belgrade, denying that a revolution was taking place. Protests continued up to 30 December, at which point the hunger strike ended. The protests were strongly criticised by the government, with Brnabić and Šapić comparing the protests to Euromaidan. Russia also alleged that Western powers were involved in the protests.

=== Government formation ===
Shortly after the closure of voting stations, SNS held a press conference at which Vučić reported that SNS placed first in the election, winning 38% of popular vote. The election resulted in a hung parliament, with Nestorović's MI–GIN being the party that could choose whether to side with the ruling coalition of SNS and SPS or the opposition of SPN and NADA. Nestorović said that "even though no one gave us a chance, we became one of the four or five strongest parties"; he rejected cooperating with either one of the blocs after the elections. "I think it will be very difficult to form a city government. There will be new elections probably soon" (Serbian: Mislim da će biti jako teško formirati gradsku vlast. Biće novih izbora verovatno brzo), Nestorović also said. Vučić also echoed that if Nestorović ends up supporting no one, early elections will be held. Nestorović and Aleksandar Pavić from MI–GIN rejected cooperation with SPN after the elections, but said that cooperation with SNS would be possible under certain demands.

Like on national level for the parliamentary elections, opposition parties pledged to form a government, if they were to win a parliamentary majority. Opposition parties and alliances that won representation after the 2023 election and that expressed their support for the formation of a government included SPN and NADA. Pavle Grbović, the president of the Movement of Free Citizens, said that "despite differences, some form of cooperation is possible [with other opposition parties], especially at the level of Belgrade" (Serbian: uprkos političkim razlikama, neki vid saradnje među opozicionim strankama [...], naročito na nivou Beograda). Vojislav Mihailović, the president of the Movement for the Restoration of the Kingdom of Serbia (POKS) and former mayor of Belgrade, said that "he does not see what can be disputed about the idea of unity of the entire opposition" (Serbian: ne vidi šta može biti sporno oko ideje o jedinstvu čitave opozicije) after the elections. Miloš Jovanović, the president of the New Democratic Party of Serbia (NDSS), also held the same view.

The constituent session of the City Assembly was held on 19 February. Toma Fila, who as the oldest councillor presided over the City Assembly, said that there was no quorum and that the session would be postponed to 1 March. SNS, SPS and MI-GIN deputies did not appear in the hall for holding sessions, while opposition councillors entered and unfurled banners waiting for the session to begin. The constituent session of the Assembly of Belgrade was postponed again to 3 March as councillors form SPS, SNS and MI-GIN did not show up again. Šapić announced that SNS would negotiate with MI-GIN until 3 March. Nestorović, however, re-confirmed MI-GIN's position of not supporting the SNS-led government. The quorum was not met again on 3 March, meaning that a new snap election had to be called by the president of the National Assembly. The election was set for 2 June. In the election, SNS and SPS united under a single banner, while the opposition remained divided. SSP, Zajedno, and Serbia Centre opted to boycott, while the rest of SPN parties took part under the We Choose Belgrade (BB) banner. The election resulted in SNS re-gaining its parliamentary majority while BB only won 14 seats. After the election, Šapić was re-elected mayor on 24 June and the Temporary Council ceased to exist.
