= Nevenka Tadić =

Serbian psychiatrist (1926–2023)

- Невенка Тадић
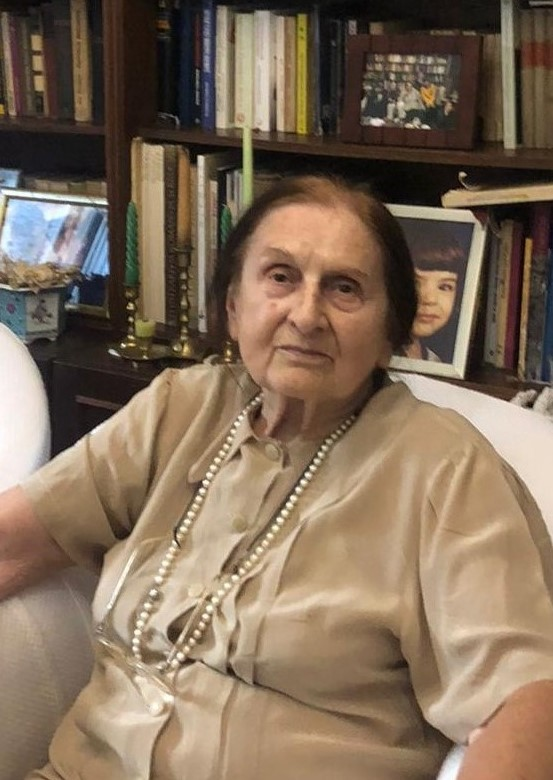
- Born: Nevenka Kićanović; 1926
- Died: September 25, 2023 (aged 96–97)
- Occupation: Neuropsychiatrist

Nevenka Tadić (née Kićanović; Serbian Cyrillic: Невенка Тадић, née Кићановић; 1926 – 25 September 2023) was a Serbian neuropsychiatrist most noted for her work in the psychotherapy of children. She was the mother of Boris Tadić, the former president of Serbia and current leader of the Social Democratic Party.

== Early life ==
Nevenka Kićanović was born in Bijeljina, Oblast of Tuzla, Kingdom of Serbs, Croats and Slovenes in 1926. Her mother Milica (née Konjević) came from the village of Drenovac Radučki in Lika to the village of Brodac near Bijeljina at the age of 16, got married there, and gave birth to a son and two daughters. Nevenka's father, Strahinja Kićanović, was a wealthy merchant and landowner, and as a leader of the Agrarian Party in Semberija before the World War II, he was twice a candidate to become a member of the Parliament of Yugoslavia. He was killed in 1942 by the Ustashas in the Jadovno concentration camp, during the World War II genocide of Serbs in the Independent State of Croatia.

== Professional career ==
After the war, Tadić got her medical degree from the University of Belgrade (Belgrade Medical School). She specialized in neuropsychiatry in Sarajevo, where she has worked from 1954 to 1962. In 1957, she went to Pitié-Salpêtrière Hospital in Paris for further education. There, she worked alongside some of the most notable French psychoanalysts such as Serge Lebovici, René Diatkine and Georges Heuyer. Afterwards, she has worked in Belgrade in the Mental Health Institute and, as a professor, on the Faculty of Defectology (today renamed to Faculty of Special education and Rehabilitation). She is an author of numerous books and articles, mainly related to the psychoanalysis of children. She has also translated the book La Psychanalyse de l'enfant by Victor Smirnoff from French in 1970.

== Personal life ==
Nevenka was married to Serbian philosopher Ljubomir Tadić (1925–2013), whom she met while studying at the University of Sarajevo and with whom she has two children – daughter Vjera (married Radović, born 1952) and son Boris (born 1958), both of whom went on to become psychologists. Boris has been the President of Serbia and the leader of the Democratic Party from 2004 to 2012. In February 2014, Boris Tadić left the Democratic Party to become the president of the Social Democratic Party.

Nevenka Tadić later lived in Belgrade. She died in September 2023, at the age of 97.
