= Sonja Pavlović =

Serbian politician

Sonja Pavlović (Serbian Cyrillic: Соња Павловић; born 1957) is a politician in Serbia. She served in the National Assembly of Serbia from 2016 to 2020, originally as a member of the reformist Enough Is Enough association and later with the Civic Platform.

== Early life and private career ==
Pavlović is a graduate of the University of Belgrade Faculty of Architecture (1985). She has worked on more than one hundred design projects, has owned the ARHIDUR project bureau in Belgrade since 2010, and has participated in the Serbian Academy of Sciences and Arts's contest for improving the city's Sava amphitheater. She lives in Belgrade.

== Political career ==
Pavlović received the eleventh position on the It's Enough – Restart electoral list in the 2016 Serbian parliamentary election and was elected when the list won sixteen mandates. The election was won by the Serbian Progressive Party and its allies, and Pavlović initially served as an opposition member in the parliamentary grouping led by Saša Radulović.

In February 2017, Pavlović and two of her parliamentary colleagues left It's Enough – Restart and launched a new organization called the Civic Platform. In May of the same year, the three members of this group joined with two parliamentarians from the New Party to start a parliamentary caucus known as the Independent MPs Club. This group had a rotating leadership, and Pavlović was for a time its deputy leader.

Pavlović was a member of the parliamentary friendship groups with Croatia, Italy, Montenegro, Qatar, and Russia.

Along with several other opposition parties, the Civic Platform boycotted the 2020 Serbian parliamentary election.
