= Civic Platform (disambiguation) =

Civic Platform was a centre-right liberal conservative political party in Poland.

Civic Platform may also refer to:

- Civic Platform (Russia), Russian political party
- Civic Platform (Serbia), Serbian political party
- Civic Platform Action 2012, Romanian coalition of non-governmental organizations
