= Jovan Jovanović (politician) =

Serbian politician and diplomat

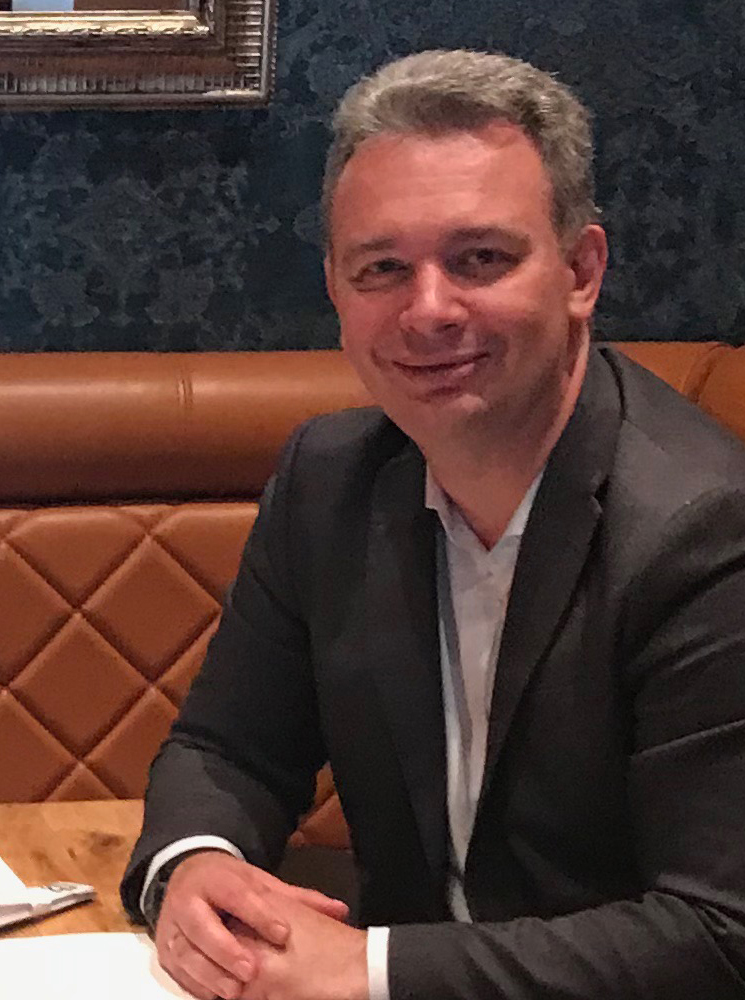

Member of the National Assembly
- In office 11 August 2016 – 3 August 2020

Ambassador of Serbia to Indonesia
- In office 2011–2014

Personal details
- Born: 10 June 1970 (age 56) Belgrade, Yugoslavia (now Serbia)
- Party: Enough is Enough (2016–2017); Civic Platform (2017–present); Serbia Centre (2022–present)
- Education: University of Belgrade; University of Pittsburgh; Harvard University

Jovan Jovanović (Serbian Cyrillic: Јован Јовановић; born 10 June 1970) is a Serbian politician and diplomat. He served in the National Assembly of Serbia from 2016 to 2020, originally with the reformist It's Enough – Restart association and later with the Civic Platform. Jovanović was previously Serbia's ambassador to Indonesia and several other countries in Southeast Asia.

== Early life and career ==
Jovanović is a graduate of the University of Belgrade Faculty of Political Sciences and has a master's degree in Public and International Affairs from the University of Pittsburgh Graduate School of Public and International Affairs. He has been an Edward Mason Fellow and a Harvard International Student Fellow of Harvard Kennedy School, where he also received a Masters of Public Administration, and has been active in numerous media, academic, and administrative projects since 2000.

Jovanović was a foreign policy advisor in the office of Serbia's deputy prime minister between 2004 and 2006, working with ministers Miroljub Labus and Ivana Dulić-Marković. In 2010, he was a special assistant to Dino Patti Djalal, spokesperson for Indonesian president Susilo Bambang Yudhoyono. From 2012 to 2014, Jovanović served as Serbia's ambassador to Indonesia and was also a non-resident ambassador to Thailand, Cambodia, Singapore, Malaysia, the Philippines, Vietnam, Brunei, East Timor, and the Association of Southeast Asian Nations (ASEAN).

== Parliamentary career ==
Jovanović received the seventeenth position on the It's Enough – Restart electoral list in the 2016 Serbian parliamentary election. The list won sixteen mandates, and he narrowly missed direct election. He was able to enter the assembly on August 11, 2016, following the resignation of Svetlana Kozić, an elected member further up the list. He initially served as an opposition member in the parliamentary grouping led by Saša Radulović.

In February 2017, Jovanović and two of his parliamentary colleagues left the It's Enough – Restart group and started a new organization called the Civic Platform. The new group supported Saša Janković's bid for the Serbian presidency in the 2017 presidential election. In May 2017, the three members of this group joined with two parliamentarians from the New Party to start a new parliamentary caucus known as the Independent MPs Club. At the assembly group's formation, they announced that the leadership would rotate among different members. Jovanović was the group's first leader in the assembly.

In 2019, Jovanović received a nomination for the T. Washington Fellows at University of Washington.

He is a member of Serbia's parliamentary friendship groups with Indonesia, Poland, Spain, and the United States of America.

Along with several other opposition parties, the Civic Platform boycotted the 2020 Serbian parliamentary election. In 2022, he joined the Serbia Centre organization led by Zdravko Ponoš.
