= Čabraja =

Čabraja is a surname. Notable people with the surname include:

- Aleksandra Čabraja (born 1965), Serbian politician
- Dejan Čabraja (born 1993), Croatian footballer
- Marijan Čabraja (born 1997), Croatian footballer
- Silvijo Čabraja (born 1968), Croatian footballer and manager
