= Aris Movsesijan =

Serbian politician

- Арис Мовсесијан
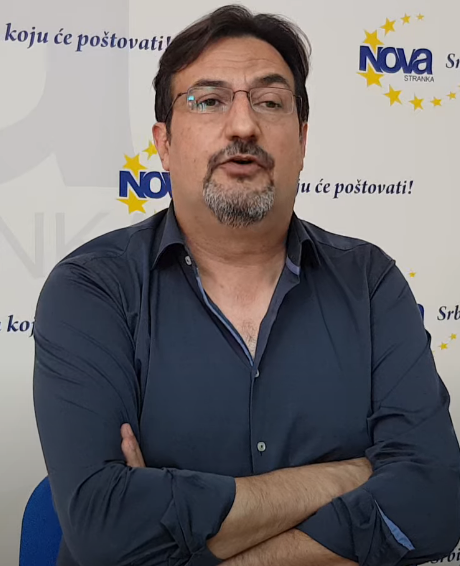
- Movsesijan in 2020.

Personal details
- Born: 22 March 1966 (age 60) Belgrade, SR Serbia, SFR Yugoslavia
- Party: Nova (2014–2023); PSG (since 2023)
- Children: 1
- Education: University of Belgrade
- Occupation: Dentist, screenwriter, movie director, writer, politician

Aris Movsesijan (Serbian Cyrillic: Арис Мовсесијан; born 22 March 1966) is a Serbian screenwriter, movie director, writer blogger, politician and a dentist. He most recently served as the president of the New Party.

== Biography ==
=== Early life and career ===
Movsesijan was born in 1966 in Belgrade, which at that time was a part of the Socialist Federal Republic of Yugoslavia. His paternal grandparents were Armenian and his grandfather Yeznik escaped the Ottoman military service and walked all the way to the Kingdom of Yugoslavia.

He graduated from the Faculty of Dentistry at the University of Belgrade.

He was the director of the movie Aporia (2006) and a screenwriter of the Svjetsko čudovište (2003).

He also wrote the book Characters and writers and said that his wish is for it to be translated to Armenian.

=== Political career ===
Movsesijan was the president of the former New Party, a social liberal political party. He has been a member of the party since 2014 and he said he joined it to fight against censorship.

He received a 148th position on the combined electoral list of the Democratic Party, New Party, Democratic Alliance of Croats in Vojvodina and the Together for Serbia for the 2016 Serbian parliamentary election.

In 2017, he said that he is sure that Serbia will one day recognize that Turkey committed genocide against the Armenians, however that currently it does not do so due to the strong relations with Turkey.

On 6 October 2020, Movsesijan and Pavle Grbović, the president of the Movement of Free Citizens announced that the unification of the two political options has formally begun.

Movsesijan joined the Movement of Free Citizens in November 2023.

Party political offices
Preceded by Zoran Živković	President of the New Party; 2020–present	Succeeded by Incumbent
