= Biserka Jevtimijević Drinjaković =

Biserka Jevtimijević Drinjaković (b. 1969 in Kosovska Mitrovica) is the current director of the supervisory board of the Serbian national oil company NIS. She was also an Advisor to the President of Serbia for economic affairs, appointed by Boris Tadić and serving from 2005 to 2008. She graduated in international law at the University of Belgrade's Law School.

== Biography ==
For five years, she worked for the World Bank Group, where successfully managed numerous projects in private sector development and sustainable development. She was awarded several times by the International Finance Corporation for successful design and implementation of development projects. She has several years of experience in International Humanitarian Sector, specialized in managing projects for economic sustainability and social integration of Internally Displaced People and Refugees.
