= Civic Platform (Serbia) =

Political organization in Serbia

Civic Platform Грађанска платформа
- Abbreviation: GP
- President: Jovan Jovanović
- Deputy President: Sonja Pavlović
- Founded: 2017
- Split from: Enough is Enough
- Ideology: Liberalism
- Political position: Centre
- Regional affiliation: Liberal South East European Network
- Colors: Blue; Green
- National Assembly: 0 / 250
- Assembly of Vojvodina: 0 / 120
- City Assembly of Belgrade: 0 / 110

Website
- gradjanskaplatforma.rs (archived)

The Civic Platform (Serbian: Грађанска платформа, romanized: Građanska platforma, GP) is a liberal political organization in Serbia.

It was formed in 2017, by former members of the Enough is Enough (DJB) organization. It had two MPs from its foundation until the 2020 parliamentary election, which it boycotted. It was the founding member of the Alliance for Serbia and was briefly a member of the United for the Victory of Serbia alliance.

== History ==
The Civic Platform was founded in April 2017 by assembly members Aleksandra Čabraja, Sonja Pavlović and Jovan Jovanović, all of whom had been elected in the 2016 Serbian parliamentary election on the DJB electoral list. In announcing its formation, Jovanović indicated that the Civic Platform was also supported by citizens and by thirteen councillors in central Belgrade.

The Civic Platform supported Saša Janković's bid for the Serbian presidency in the 2017 Serbian presidential election. In May 2017, the three members of this group joined with two parliamentarians from the New Party to start a new parliamentary caucus known as the Independent MPs Club.

Čabraja was excluded from the Independent MPs Club on 25 March 2019 and subsequently charged that the club had become a de facto extension of the Alliance for Serbia coalition. Jovanović rejected this charge.

Along with several other opposition parties, the Civic Platform boycotted the 2020 Serbian parliamentary election. It was briefly a member of the United for the Victory of Serbia coalition, although shortly after he 2022 Serbian general election, it left the coalition and ultimately boycotted the election.

== Electoral performance ==
=== Parliamentary election ===
National Assembly
Year	Leader	Popular vote	% of popular vote	# of seats	Seat change	Coalition	Status
2020	Jovan Jovanović	Election boycott		0 / 250	▼3	SzS	No seats
2022	Jovan Jovanović	Election boycott		0 / 250	0	–	No seats
