= European Prize for Political Culture =

Swiss award

The European Prize for Political Culture (German: Europapreis für politische Kultur) is endowed with 50,000 euros and is awarded by the Swiss Hans Ringier Foundation in Ascona. Foundation President is Frank A. Meyer. The award ceremony has been part of the traditional "Dîner Républicain" by Frank A. Meyer in the Hotel Castello del Sole in Ascona. The "Dîner Républicain" has been taking place for over 40 years on the occasion of the Locarno International Film Festival.

== Recipients ==
- 2006 Jean-Claude Juncker
- 2007 Boris Tadić
- 2008 Jürgen Habermas
- 2009 Pascal Lamy
- 2010 Jean-Claude Trichet
- 2011 Hans-Dietrich Genscher
- 2012 Donald Tusk
- 2013 Wolfgang Schäuble
- 2014 Heinrich August Winkler
- 2015 Mario Draghi
- 2016 Frank-Walter Steinmeier
- 2017 Margrethe Vestager
- 2018 Sir Christopher Clark
- 2019 Zuzana Čaputová
- 2021 Peter Sloterdijk
- 2022 Kaja Kallas
- 2023 Alexei Navalny
- 2024 Anne Applebaum and Radosław Sikorski
- 2025 Adolf Muschg
