= Vladimir Kovačević (businessman) =

Serbian businessman politician

- Владимир Ковачевић

Personal details
- Political party: Narodna (until 2021); Nova–D2SP (2022–present)
- Occupation: Businessman; politician

Vladimir Kovačević (Serbian Cyrillic: Владимир Ковачевић) is a Serbian businessman and politician. A former high-ranking member of the People's Party (Narodna), he is now the president of Nova–D2SP.

== Business career ==
Kovačević owns multiple companies and three factories in the pharmaceutical and textile industries.

== Political career ==
Kovačević was a high-ranking member of the People's Party (Narodna) and the president of its economy and entrepreneurship board. He left Narodna in October 2021, citing the failure to highlight economic issues and problems. Kovačević criticised Narodna's leader Vuk Jeremić.

In December 2021, he founded Experts Should Have A Say (D2SP) political organisation. In July 2022, D2SP merged with the New Party (Nova), forming the Nova-D2SP political party with Kovačević being elected president of the party. Kovačević is heading the Serbia in the West coalition's electoral list in the 2023 parliamentary and Belgrade City Assembly elections.

== Personal life ==
Kovačević resides in Belgrade.
