= Ljubomir Tadić =

Serbian academic and politician (1925–2013)

- Љубомир Тадић
- Born: 14 May 1925; Smriječno, Plužine, Kingdom of Yugoslavia
- Died: 31 December 2013 (aged 88); Belgrade, Serbia
- Occupations: Academic; Philosopher

Ljubomir "Ljuba" Tadić (Serbian Cyrillic: Љубомир "Љуба" Тадић; 14 May 1925 – 31 December 2013) was a Serbian academic and politician.

== Biography ==
He was born in Smriječno village near Plužine, then in the Kingdom Serbs, Croats and Slovenes. He was a Belgrade Law School graduate and a professor of philosophy at the University of Belgrade Faculty of Philosophy as well as a member of the Serbian Academy of Sciences and Arts. His father Pavle Tadić was a lieutenant of the Montenegrin Army in the wars against the Ottoman Empire. Pavle opened the first school in Piva, during the Kingdom of Yugoslavia.

Tadić was one of the founders of the Democratic Party (DS) in Serbia in December 1989. He was one of the leaders of the pro-European movement in Serbia. Tadić was of the Piva Herzegovinian clan.

Tadić was married to psychiatrist Nevenka Kićanović and had two children. His son Boris Tadić served as the President of Serbia from 2004 to 2012. Ljuba Tadić died in Belgrade, Serbia, aged 88.
