= Aleksandra Čabraja =

Serbian politician

Aleksandra Čabraja (Serbian Cyrillic: Александра Чабраја; born 1965) is a politician in Serbia. She has served in the National Assembly of Serbia since 2016, originally with the reformist It's Enough – Restart association and later with the Civic Platform and the Green Party.

== Early life and career ==
Čabraja graduated in English literature and the English language from the University of Belgrade Faculty of Philology and subsequently became a teacher in these subjects. She has translated several books into Serbian, including publications by Margaret Atwood and Philippa Gregory.

== Parliamentary career ==
Čabraja received the ninth position on the It's Enough – Restart electoral list in the 2016 Serbian parliamentary election and was declared elected when the list won sixteen mandates. The election was won by the Serbian Progressive Party and its allies, and Čabraja serves as an opposition member.

In February 2017, Čabraja and two of her parliamentary colleagues left the It's Enough – Restart parliamentary group and started a new organization called the Civic Platform. In announcing her decision, Čabraja said that It's Enough – Restart did not deal well with dissenting opinions. The new group supported Saša Janković's bid for the Serbian presidency in the 2017 election. In May 2017, the three members of this group joined with two parliamentarians from the New Party to start a new parliamentary caucus known as the Independent MPs Club.

Early in her mandate, Čabraja was a member of the assembly's culture and information committee. She is a member of the parliamentary friendship groups for Austria, Canada, Greece, Italy, and the United Kingdom.

Čabraja was excluded from the Independent MPs Club on 25 March 2019 and subsequently charged that the club had become a de facto extension of the Alliance for Serbia coalition. She joined the Green Party on 24 April 2019, becoming its second member in the assembly. She does not appear to still be a member of the party, however; a June 2020 report in Danas listed her as an independent, as does the National Assembly's website. Unlike the Green Party, she supports a boycott of the 2020 Serbian parliamentary election.
