= Good Morning Serbia =

Political coalition in Serbia

Good Morning Serbia Добро јутро Србијо
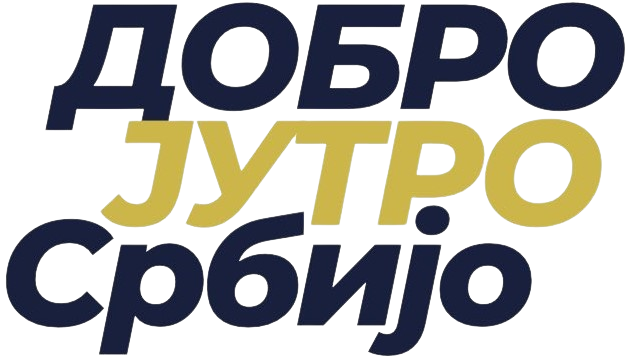
- Abbreviation: DJS
- Representatives: Saša Radulović; Boris Tadić; Ana Pejić
- Founded: 6 November 2023; 2 years ago
- Dissolved: December 2023; 2 years ago
- Ideology: Anti-Ohrid Agreement
- Colours: Gold; Blue

Good Morning Serbia (Serbian: Добро јутро Србијо, romanised: Dobro jutro Srbijo, abbr. DJS) was an electoral alliance in Serbia that took part in the parliamentary, Vojvodina provincial, and Belgrade City Assembly elections on 17 December 2023. Its members are Enough is Enough, Social Democratic Party, and the "Stolen Babies" citizens group. It has mainly campaigned on rejecting the proposed Ohrid Agreement. In the elections it contested, it failed to cross the thresholds.

== History ==
=== Formation ===
Shortly before the 2023 Serbian parliamentary election was called on 1 November 2023, the Social Democratic Party (SDS) held negotiations with the People's Movement of Serbia (NPS) in order to take part in the elections under the Serbia Against Violence (SPN) alliance. Once the elections were called, SDS announced that it submitted its application to join the alliance, however, Miroslav Aleksić of NPS responded by rejecting its application due to opposing views inside the SPN alliance. During the same period, Enough is Enough (DJB) of Saša Radulović announced that it would contest the elections independently.

On 6 November 2023, DJB and SDS reached a deal on taking part in the elections together, including Ana Pejić's Stolen Babies (OBAP) citizens group.

=== 2023 elections ===
The DJB–SDS–OBAP alliance submitted its electoral list to the Republic Electoral Commission (RIK) on 22 November 2023, under the name "Good Morning Serbia" (DJS). A day later, its electoral list was confirmed by RIK. Its electoral lists for the 2023 Belgrade City Assembly election and 2023 Vojvodina provincial election were announced by electoral commission on 25 and 29 November 2023, respectively. For the Belgrade City Assembly election, DJS announced Dejan Žujović as its mayoral candidate.

== Ideology and platform ==
During the campaign period, DJS mainly emphasised their joint opposition to the Ohrid Agreement. They have also criticised the SPN alliance, which SDS initially wanted to join, with Tadić saying that DJS does not belong to either the SNS or SPN blocs. DJS does not hold specific positions on the European Union, considering that SDS supports the accession of Serbia to the European Union and DJB opposes it. DJS opposes the independence of Kosovo. Radulović also said that "Serbian agriculture needs a system of cooperatives modeled on Denmark and the Netherlands, as well as investment in individual producers".

== Members ==
| Name | Leader(s) | Main ideology | Political position | National Assembly | Assembly of Vojvodina | City Assembly of Belgrade |
|---|---|---|---|---|---|---|
| Enough is Enough (DJB) | Saša Radulović | Right-wing populism | Right-wing to far-right | 0 / 250 | 0 / 120 | 0 / 110 |
| Social Democratic Party (SDS) | Boris Tadić | Social democracy | Centre-left | 0 / 250 | 0 / 120 | 0 / 110 |
| Stolen Babies (OBAP) | Ana Pejić | Anti-baby trafficking | | 0 / 250 | 0 / 120 | 0 / 110 |

== Electoral performance ==
=== Parliamentary elections ===
National Assembly
| Year | Leader | | Popular vote | % of popular vote | # | # of seats | Seat change | Status | Ref. |
| Year | Name | Party | Popular vote | % of popular vote | # | # of seats | Seat change | Status | Ref. |
|---|---|---|---|---|---|---|---|---|---|
| 2023 | Saša Radulović | DJB | 45,079 | 1.21% | ▲9th | 0 / 250 | 0 | Extra-parliamentary | |

=== Provincial elections ===
Assembly of Vojvodina
| Year | Leader | | Popular vote | % of popular vote | # | # of seats | Seat change | Status | Ref. |
| Year | Name | Party | Popular vote | % of popular vote | # | # of seats | Seat change | Status | Ref. |
|---|---|---|---|---|---|---|---|---|---|
| 2023 | Aleksandar Bujić | DJB | 14,715 | 1.54% | ▲9th | 0 / 120 | 0 | Extra-parliamentary | |

=== Belgrade City Assembly elections ===
City Assembly of Belgrade
| Year | Leader | | Popular vote | % of popular vote | # | # of seats | Seat change | Status | Ref. |
| Year | Name | Party | Popular vote | % of popular vote | # | # of seats | Seat change | Status | Ref. |
|---|---|---|---|---|---|---|---|---|---|
| 2023 | Dejan Žujović | SDS | 14,695 | 1.60% | ▲8th | 0 / 110 | 0 | Extra-parliamentary | |

== See also ==
- Sovereignists – a 2022 Serbian parliamentary election electoral alliance which DJB was a member of
