= Nenad Milić =

Serbian politician

- Born: 22 June 1962 (age 63)
- Occupation: Politician

Nenad Milić (Serbian Cyrillic: Ненад Милић; born 22 June 1962) is a politician in Serbia. At one time a prominent figure in Zoran Đinđić's administration, Milić has served in the National Assembly of Serbia on an almost continuous basis since 2007 as a member of the Liberal Democratic Party.

== Early life and education ==
Milić was born in Belgrade, in what was then the People's Republic of Serbia in the Federal People's Republic of Yugoslavia. He holds a Bachelor of Laws degree from the University of Belgrade Faculty of Law.

== Career ==
=== Beginnings ===
Milić worked in the Serbian ministry of the interior before entering political life, at one time serving as an inspector. He was head of general administration and secretary of the Belgrade municipality of Rakovica from 1997 to 2001.

=== Democratic Opposition of Serbia and the Đinđić administration ===
Milić was head of legal service at the central election staff of the Democratic Opposition of Serbia (DOS) from 2000 to 2002 and served on the Republic of Serbia's electoral commission in the same period. He was an active member of Vojislav Koštunica's electoral staff in the 2000 Yugoslavian presidential election, in which Koštunica challenged incumbent president Slobodan Milošević. On the eve of the vote, Milić was quoted as saying, "We are working day and night to prepare against all the tricks the regime used in past elections." He later challenged the initial published results of the first round of voting, arguing that the Milošević regime had inflated the total number of votes in two areas of Kosovo to deny Koštunica an outright majority victory. Following popular protests, the election commission released a revised vote count showing that Koštunica had indeed won an outright victory in the first round.

Milić was later the primary legal representative of the DOS in a court dispute over voting irregularities in a small number of polling stations following the 2000 Serbian parliamentary election. He advised the international media in January 2001 that a new Serbian government would soon be formed, following the exhaustion of the Serbian Radical Party's legal challenges against the vote.

Milić served as chief of Serbian prime minister Zoran Đinđić's cabinet from 2001 to 2002, and from 2002 to 2004 he was the deputy minister of internal affairs. In the latter context, he took part in discussions with authorities in Bosnia and Herzegovina to better target criminal activities in the two countries; during this time, he remarked that the possible arrest of Ratko Mladić, Radovan Karadžić, and others by the International Criminal Tribunal for the Former Yugoslavia (ICTY) would not destabilize the region. He also participated in the creation of a regional strategy against organized crime, signed in Montenegro in October 2003.

Milić denied claims by Radical Party leader Vojislav Šešelj that British Special Air Service forces had tried to kidnap him at the behest of the ICTY in early 2003.

Following the assassination of Zoran Đinđić in March 2003, Milić was appointed to a working group to monitor and oversee the conclusion of the resulting state of emergency.

=== Democratic Party, the 2003 election, and removal from office ===
The Democratic Opposition of Serbia dissolved in December 2003. Milić received the 198th position (out of 250) on the Democratic Party's electoral list in the 2003 Serbian parliamentary election. The party won thirty-seven seats, and Milić was not chosen as part of its parliamentary delegation. (From 2000 to 2011, parliamentary mandates were awarded to sponsoring parties or coalitions rather than to individual candidates, and it was common practice for the mandates to be distributed out of numerical order. Milić could have received a mandate despite his low position on the list, although in the event he was not.)

The Democratic Party was not part of the new government of Serbia formed after the 2003 election. In March 2004, Milić was fired as deputy interior minister by the new minister, Dragan Jočić. Jočić later stated that Milić, rather than the previous minister, had been responsible for overseeing cases related to war crimes while in office. In June 2004, Milić was dismissed from Serbia and Montenegro's national council for cooperation with the ICTY.

=== Liberal Democratic Party ===
The Democratic Party split in 2004, and a group of party rebels led by Čedomir Jovanović subsequently formed a new organization called the Liberal Democratic Party (LDP). Milić sided with Jovanović and was elected to the LDP's presidency at its founding convention in November 2005.

In 2006, Milić charged the Serbian government of failing to operate an effective witness protection program in relation to the Đinđić murder trial and stated that Serbian police were not interested in arresting six remaining fugitives from the Zemun Clan.

During the 2007 Serbian parliamentary election, Milić stated that there had been an assassination attempt against Čedomir Jovanović, in which "five or six connected fuses [were] found under the back seat in the [party leader's] car where Jovanović usually sits." The LDP expressed outage when the interior ministry rejected reports that an explosive device had been planted in the car.

Milić was included on an LDP-fronted list in this election and was chosen for his party's assembly delegation when the list won fifteen mandates. Following the election, he represented the LDP in discussions with Serbian president Boris Tadić on the Ahtisaari Plan on the status of Kosovo and Metohija. He later served on the assembly's security committee and strongly opposed suggestions that the Serbian military could intervene in Kosovo and Metohija in the event of the disputed province declaring its independence. "Our troops have no business in Kosovo. We have been there and we remember how we fared, in spite of exclamations that we beat NATO. We would 'win' again that way," he said, adding that, "calls for the army to defend the Kosovo Serbs could only harm Serbia now."

In 2007, Milić was asked if the Đinđić government had succumbed to political pressures not to extradite Radovan Karadžić to the ICTY. He rejected the charge, stating, "Do you really think that we would have handed over Milošević and not handed over Karadžić? For the Serbian political scene and the Serbian society, it was much more difficult and more important - and it required more political courage and, as we unfortunately saw subsequently, personal courage as well - to hand over Milošević than Karadžić, Mladić or any other indictee."

The LDP fielded its own electoral list in the 2008 parliamentary election. Milić received the seventeenth position on the list and was again selected for the party's assembly delegation when the list won thirteen mandates. He continued to serve on Serbia's security committee.

Serbia's electoral system was reformed in 2011, such that parliamentary mandates were awarded in numerical order to candidates on successful lists. The LDP contested the 2012 parliamentary election as part of the Preokret (U-Turn) coalition; Milić received the tenth position on its list and was re-elected when the list won nineteen mandates. He once again served on the security committee after the election.

Milić received the fourth position on a coalition list led by the LDP in the 2014 election; the list did not receive enough support to cross the electoral threshold, and Milić did not serve in the parliament that followed. He received the seventh position on a list that included the LDP and other parties in the 2016 election and returned to parliament when the list won thirteen mandates. He is currently a member of the parliamentary environmental protection committee and a deputy member of three other committees. For all of his parliamentary career, Milić has been an opposition member.
