= Liberal South East European Network =

Liberal European political alliance

- Coordinator: Monika Zajkova
- Founded: 2008
- Headquarters: Kapucinska 26/2, 31000 Osijek, Croatia
- Ideology: Liberalism

Website
- libseen.tumblr.com

The Liberal South East European Network (LIBSEEN) is a liberal European political alliance gathering parties and think tanks in Southeastern Europe. LIBSEEN was founded in Skopje, North Macedonia, in 2008. Its goal is to gather liberal parties of Southeastern Europe and implement liberal policies in their respective countries. Most member organisations of LIBSEEN are also members of Alliance of Liberals and Democrats for Europe Party (ALDE).

== Members ==
Bosnia and Herzegovina

- Our Party (Naša stranka)

Bulgaria

- Movement for Rights and Freedoms (Dvizhenie za prava i svobodi)
  - DPS – A New Beginning (expelled 14 December 2024)
- Alliance for Rights and Freedoms
- We Continue the Change (Продължаваме промяната)

Croatia

- Croatian People's Party-Liberal Democrats (Hrvatska Narodna Stranka - Liberalni Demokrati)
- Croatian Social Liberal Party (Hrvatska socijalno liberalna stranka)
- Istrian Democratic Assembly (Istarski demokratski sabor/Dieta Democratica Istriana)
- Centre (Centar)

Hungary

- Hungarian European Society (Magyarországi Európa Társaság)

Kosovo

- Democratic Party of Kosovo (Partia Demokratike e Kosovës)
- New Kosovo Alliance (Aleanca Kosova e Re)

Moldova

- Liberal Party (Partidul Liberal)

Montenegro

- Liberal Party of Montenegro (Liberalna Partija Crne Gore)

North Macedonia

- Liberal Democratic Party (Либерално Демократска Партија, Liberalno Demokratska Partija)

Romania

- USR - Save Romania Union

Serbia

- Movement of Free Citizens (Покрет слободних грађана, Pokret slobodnih građana)
- Civic Platform (Грађанска платформа)

Slovenia

- Freedom Movement (Slovenia) - Gibanje Svoboda
- Novum Institute (New Institute)

== See also ==
- Political parties of the world
- Liberal International
- European Liberal Youth
