= Aleksandra Čamagić =

Serbian politician

Aleksandra Čamagić (Serbian Cyrillic: Александра Чамагић; born 1985) is a politician and administrator in Serbia. She briefly served in the National Assembly of Serbia in 2020 as a member of the Serbian Patriotic Alliance (Srpski patriotski savez, SPAS) and is now an assistant minister in the country's ministry of family welfare and demography.

== Early life and career ==
Čamagić was born in Belgrade, in what was then the Socialist Republic of Serbia in the Socialist Federal Republic Yugoslavia. She is a graduate of the University of Belgrade's Faculty of Philology and is a professor of English language and literature. She served as director of the New Belgrade Cultural Network until her resignation on 28 December 2020.

== Politician ==
=== Municipal politics ===
Čamagić sought election to the New Belgrade municipal assembly in the 2016 Serbian local elections, appearing in the forty-fourth position on an independent electoral list led by incumbent mayor Aleksandar Šapić. This was too low a position for election to be a realistic prospect, and she was not elected even as the list won a narrow plurality victory with twenty-one seats.

Šapić's political movement was registered as the Serbian Patriotic Alliance in 2018. Čamagić was promoted to the twenty-second position on the party's list in the 2020 local elections and was this time elected when the list won twenty-three mandates. In August 2021, she was appointed to the municipality's commission for gender equality.

Čamagić served on the presidency of the SPAS. In 2021, the party was merged into the Serbian Progressive Party (Srpska napredna stranka, SNS).

=== Parliamentarian ===
Čamagić received the seventh position on the SPAS electoral list in the 2020 Serbian parliamentary election (which occurred concurrently with the local elections) and was elected when the list won eleven seats. Her term in the assembly was brief; she resigned on 19 November 2020.

=== Assistant minister ===
Čamagić now serves as an assistant minister in Serbia's ministry of family welfare and demography. In July 2021, she announced that Serbia was introducing more demanding training for foster parents and adoptive parents.

=== Embezzlement scandal ===
Millions of euros earmarked for lectures on preventing peer and digital violence in 2021, the first year post the corona virus pandemic outbreak, were allocated by the Ministry of Family Care and Demography to phantom associations. These organizations, each receiving an average of 210,000 euros, became conduits for a dubious financial scheme.

At the center of this controversy is Aleksandra Čamagić, one of three close associates of Aleksandar Šapić, alongside Bisera Pejčić and Kristina Glišić. Serving as members of the competition commissions at the Ministry, they wielded influence in awarding funds and approving fabricated reports submitted by these dubious organizations.

BIRN's investigation exposes that these phantom entities, associated with Čamagić's involvement in their financing over the years, diverted the allocated funds. Instead of conducting lectures in schools across 17 cities in Serbia, the money found its way into the coffers of numerous private agencies owned by their relatives, friends, neighbors, and acquaintances.

Regrettably, the intended lectures either did not take place or were conducted on a significantly smaller scale, often relegated to the purview of the local youth office. The scandal raises questions about the integrity of the allocation process and the misuse of public funds under the influence of key individuals like Aleksandra Čamagić.
