= Social Democratic Party (Serbia) =

Political party in Serbia

Social Democratic Party Социјалдемократска странка
- Abbreviation: SDS
- President: Boris Tadić
- General Secretary: Dragoslav Ljubičić
- Vice-President: Vojislav Janković
- Founder: Boris Tadić
- Founded: 14 June 2014
- Split from: Democratic Party
- Preceded by: New Democratic Party — Greens
- Headquarters: Radoslava Grujića 25, Belgrade
- Ideology: Social democracy; Pro-Europeanism
- Political position: Centre-left
- European affiliation: Party of European Socialists (cooperation)
- International affiliation: Progressive Alliance
- Colours: Red
- National Assembly: 0 / 250
- Assembly of Vojvodina: 0 / 120
- City Assembly of Belgrade: 0 / 110

Website
- sds-org.rs

The Social Democratic Party (SDS; Serbian: Социјалдемократска странка, romanised: Socijaldemokratska stranka) is a centre-left political party in Serbia.

The party was founded and is headed by Boris Tadić, who was previously president of the Democratic Party and the former President of Serbia. Between June and October 2014, the name of the party was the New Democratic Party (Serbian: Нова демократска странка, romanised: Nova demokratska stranka, NDS). In May 2019, the party formed a union with Democratic Party and Together for Serbia. It supports accession of Serbia to the European Union and it is a member of the Progressive Alliance.

== History ==
Tadić revealed in February 2014 his intention to secede from the Democratic Party and to form a new party to take part in the 2014 parliamentary election. But, after realising that they don't have enough time to register a new party before the election, Tadić and his supporters made a deal with the Greens of Serbia. As part of this deal, Tadić and his supporters joined the Greens of Serbia, and then on 10 February 2014 the name of the party was changed to the "New Democratic Party – Greens". Although Ivan Karić was still officially president of this party, Tadić became its de facto leader. Party then participated in the 2014 parliamentary election under that name in coalition with Together for Serbia, League of Social Democrats of Vojvodina and some other minor parties. This coalition won 5.7% of the electoral vote and 18 seats in the National Assembly of Serbia. Of these, 11 seats were allocated to the "New Democratic Party – Greens", but only one to the original Greens (Ivan Karić) and 10 to the group around Boris Tadić.

After the 2014 parliamentary election, a divergence emerged in the "New Democratic Party – Greens" between the original Greens and group of members that joined the party with Tadić. On 14 June, Tadić and his supporters decided to secede from the Greens and form "New Democratic Party" as a separate party, while the name of the "New Democratic Party—Greens" was changed back to the "Greens of Serbia". In the National Assembly, 10 deputies of the New Democratic Party are part of the parliamentary group of 12 deputies together with Ivan Karić of the Greens and Blagoje Bradić of Together for Serbia, and they are in the opposition to the current Government of Serbia. First internal party elections were held on 4 October 2014. Boris Tadić was elected president of the party. On the same day, the official name of the party was changed to the "Social Democratic Party".

As of January 2017, the Social Democratic Party holds four seats in the National Assembly of Serbia. It exists in a parliamentary alliance with the People's Movement of Serbia, which holds one seat. On 10 January 2022, it was announced that the Democrats of Serbia, a break-away faction from the Democratic Party, will merge with SDS. In the Parliamentary Assembly of the Council of Europe, SDS was associated with the Socialist Group. In the 2023 Serbian parliamentary election, SDS contested as part of the Good Morning Serbia alliance.

== List of presidents ==
#	President	Birth–Death	Term start	Term end
1	Boris Tadić	1958–	14 June 2014	Incumbent

== Electoral results ==
=== Parliamentary elections ===
National Assembly of Serbia
Year	Leader	Popular vote	% of popular vote	#	# of seats	Seat change	Coalition	Status	Ref.
2014	Boris Tadić	204,767	5.89%	▲4th	9 / 250	▲9	NDS–Z–ZZS–LSV	Opposition	
2016	Boris Tadić	189,564	5.17%	▼7th	4 / 250	▼5	SDS–LDP–LSV	Opposition	
2020	Boris Tadić	Election boycott			0 / 250	▼4	–	Extra-parliamentary	
2022	Boris Tadić	63,560	1.72%	▲10th	0 / 250	0	SDS–Nova	Extra-parliamentary	
2023	Boris Tadić	45,079	1.21%	▲9th	0 / 250	0	DJS	Extra-parliamentary	
2026	Boris Tadić	Did not participate			0 / 250	0	Supported SL	Extra-parliamentary	

=== Presidential elections ===
President of Serbia
Year	Candidate	1st round popular vote		% of popular vote	2nd round popular vote		% of popular vote	Notes	Ref.
2017	Vuk Jeremić	4th	206,676	5.75%	—N/a	—	—	Supported Jeremić	
2022	Zdravko Ponoš	2nd	698,538	18.84%	—N/a	—	—	Supported Ponoš	

=== Provincial elections ===
Assembly of Vojvodina
Year	Leader	Popular vote	% of popular vote	#	# of seats	Seat change	Coalition	Status	Ref.
2016	Boris Tadić	26,800	2.86%	▲9th	0 / 120	0	SDS–LDP	Extra-parliamentary	
2020	Boris Tadić	Election boycott			0 / 120	0	–	Extra-parliamentary	
2023	Boris Tadić	14,715	1.54%	▲9th	0 / 250	0	DJS	Extra-parliamentary	

=== Belgrade City Assembly elections ===
City Assembly of Belgrade
Year	Leader	Popular vote	% of popular vote	#	# of seats	Seat change	Coalition	Status	Ref.
2014	Boris Tadić	29,504	3.80%	▲6th	0 / 110	0	NDS–Z–ZZS	Extra-parliamentary	
2018	Boris Tadić	18,286	2.28%	▼9th	0 / 110	0	SDS–DS–Nova–ZEP–Zeleni	Extra-parliamentary	
2022	Boris Tadić	26,219	2.92%	▲8th	0 / 110	0	SDS–Nova	Extra-parliamentary	
2023	Boris Tadić	14,695	1.60%	8th	0 / 110	0	DJB	Extra-parliamentary	
2024	Boris Tadić	Did not participate			0 / 110	0	–	Extra-parliamentary	–
