= New Party (Serbia) =

Political party in Serbia

New Party–Experts Should Have A Say Нова странка–Да се струка пита Nova stranka–Da se struka pita
- Abbreviation: Nova–D2SP
- President: Vladimir Kovačević
- Founders: Zoran Živković; Vladimir Pavićević
- Founded: 7 April 2013
- Split from: Democratic Party
- Headquarters: Terazije 29, Belgrade
- Ideology: Liberalism; Social liberalism
- Political position: Centre
- Regional affiliation: LIBSEEN (until May 2022)
- Parliamentary group: Movement Sloga–Experts Should Have A Say
- Colours: Yellow; Blue
- National Assembly: 0 / 250
- City Assembly of Belgrade: 0 / 110

Website
- dasestrukapita.rs

New Party–Experts Should Have A Say (Serbian: Нова странка–Да се струка пита, romanised: Nova stranka–Da se struka pita, abbr. Nova–D2SP) is a liberal political party in Serbia. It was founded in 2013 as the New Party by Zoran Živković, the former Prime Minister of Serbia and former member of the Democratic Party. Following the merger in 2022, Vladimir Kovačević became the party president.

== History ==
Established in early 2013, the party advocates close ties to the western powers and European integration. The party contested the 2014 parliamentary election as part of a wider coalition of moderate parties led by the Democratic Party. It formed a coalition with the Social Democratic Party led by former President of Serbia Boris Tadić for the 2022 general election. In late April 2022, Movsesijan stepped down as party leader. A month later, the party left the Liberal South East European Network.

In July 2022, New Party merged with the "Experts Should Have a Say" and the party was renamed to New Party–Experts Should Have A Say. Vladimir Kovačević, a former high-ranking member of the People's Party was elected president of the party. In November 2024, Slavica Radovanović, an MP from the People's Movement of Serbia (NPS), defected from NPS and was appointed deputy president of Nova-D2SP, thus making Nova-D2SP a parliamentary party. The party joined the parliamentary group led by Željko Veselinović.

== List of presidents ==
#	President	Birth–Death	Term start	Term end
1	Zoran Živković	1960–	7 April 2013	3 October 2020
2	Aris Movsesijan	1966–	3 October 2020	28 April 2022
3	Norbert Cvijanov		12 May 2022	2 July 2022
4	Vladimir Kovačević		2 July 2022	Incumbent

== Electoral performance ==
=== Parliamentary elections ===
National Assembly of Serbia
Year	Leader	Popular vote	% of popular vote	#	# of seats	Seat change	Coalition	Status	Ref.
2014	Zoran Živković	216,634	6.23%	▲3rd	2 / 250	▲2	Nova–DS–DSHV–BS	Opposition	
2016	Zoran Živković	227,589	6.20%	▼5th	1 / 250	▼1	Nova–DS–DSHV–ZZS–ZZŠ	Opposition	
2020	Zoran Živković	7,805	0.25%	▼20th	0 / 250	▼1	Nova–ZES	Extra-parliamentary	
2022	Aris Movsesijan	63,560	1.72%	▲10th	0 / 250	0	Nova–SDS	Extra-parliamentary	
2023	Vladimir Kovačević	5,462	0.15%	▼17th	0 / 250	0	Nova–D2SP–GDF–Libdem–Glas	Extra-parliamentary	

=== Presidential elections ===
President of Serbia
Year	Candidate	1st round popular vote		% of popular vote	2nd round popular vote		% of popular vote	Notes	Ref.
2017	Saša Janković	2nd	507,728	16.63%	—N/a	—	—	Supported Janković	
2022	Zdravko Ponoš	2nd	698,538	18.84%	—N/a	—	—	Supported Ponoš	
