= Boris Tadić =

President of Serbia from 2004 to 2012

- Борис Тадић
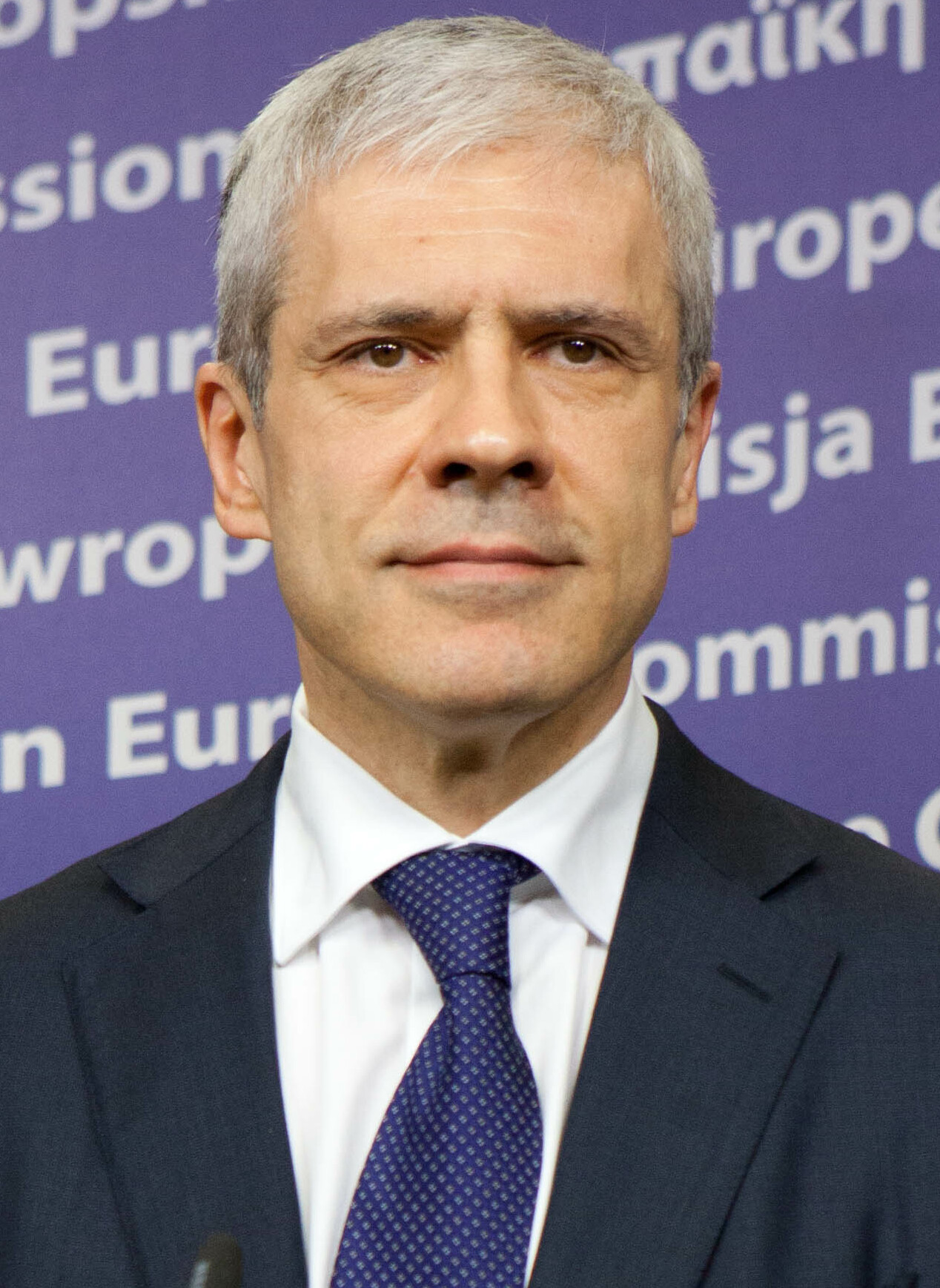
- Tadić in 2012

President of Serbia
- In office 11 July 2004 – 5 April 2012
- Prime Minister: Vojislav Koštunica; Mirko Cvetković
- Preceded by: Predrag Marković (acting)
- Succeeded by: Slavica Đukić Dejanović (acting); Tomislav Nikolić

Minister of Defence of Serbia and Montenegro
- In office 17 March 2003 – 16 April 2004
- President: Svetozar Marović
- Preceded by: Velimir Radojević
- Succeeded by: Prvoslav Davinić

Minister of Telecommunications of the Federal Republic of Yugoslavia
- In office 4 November 2000 – 7 March 2003
- President: Vojislav Koštunica
- Prime Minister: Zoran Žižić; Dragiša Pešić
- Preceded by: Ivan Marković
- Succeeded by: Office abolished

Personal details
- Born: 15 January 1958 (age 68) Sarajevo, PR Bosnia and Herzegovina, FPR Yugoslavia
- Party: DS (1990–2014); SDS (2014–present)
- Spouses: Veselinka Zastavniković (m. 1980; div. 1996) Tatjana Rodić (m. 1997; div. 2019)
- Children: Maša; Vanja
- Parents: Ljubomir Tadić (father); Nevenka Kićanović (mother)
- Education: University of Belgrade

Boris Tadić (Note: Serbian Cyrillic: Борис Тадић, pronounced [bǒris tǎdiːt͡ɕ]) (born 15 January 1958) is a Serbian politician who served as president of Serbia from 2004 to 2012. He led the Democratic Party (DS) from 2004 to 2012 as well, and previously served as minister of defence from 2003 to 2004.

Born in Sarajevo, he graduated from the University of Belgrade with a degree in psychology. He later worked as a journalist, military psychologist, and teacher at the First Belgrade Gymnasium. Tadić joined DS in 1990 and was elected to the National Assembly after the 1993 election. After the downfall of Slobodan Milošević in 2000, he was appointed as the minister of telecommunications in the government of the Federal Republic of Yugoslavia, a role which he held until 2003, after which he was appointed minister of defence in the government of Serbia. Tadić was elected president of DS a year after the assassination of Zoran Đinđić after previously serving as a member of its provisional leadership. He stood as a candidate for DS in the 2004 presidential elections, which he won after beating Tomislav Nikolić of the Serbian Radical Party in the second round.

During his first mandate, he advocated cooperation and reconciliation of the former Yugoslav countries, became the first Serbian head of state or head of government to visit the Srebrenica Genocide Memorial, and launched an initiative for the Serbian parliament to adopt a resolution condemning the Srebrenica massacre. He successfully ran for re-election in 2008 after again beating Nikolić in the second round. During his second mandate, DS formed a coalition government with the Socialist Party of Serbia, its former opponent, which signed the Stabilisation and Association Agreement (SAA), while the EU abolished visas for Serbian citizens travelling to Schengen Area countries and Serbia received EU candidate status. Additionally, Serbia also completed its obligations to the International Criminal Tribunal for the former Yugoslavia (ICTY). The period during his second mandate was also characterised by the challenges of the 2008 Kosovo declaration of independence and the 2008 financial crisis, leading to low rates of economic growth.

After being pressured by protests that were organised by Nikolić's Serbian Progressive Party in 2011, Tadić announced that snap elections will be held in 2012. He lost in the second round to Nikolić, who succeeded him as president of Serbia. Tadić was replaced by Dragan Đilas as the president of DS in November 2012, after which Tadić unsuccessfully sought to become the party's president again in 2014. He then left DS and formed the New Democratic Party, later renamed to Social Democratic Party, which remained a parliamentary party up to the 2020 election, which it boycotted. A self-described liberal, he is an advocate of closer ties with the European Union (EU), supports the accession of Serbia to the European Union, and is widely regarded as pro-Western-orientated, while favouring balanced relations with Russia, China, United States, and the European Union.

== Early life ==
Tadić was born in Sarajevo, the capital of the People's Republic of Bosnia and Herzegovina, a republic within the Federal People's Republic of Yugoslavia. His father, Ljubomir, was a philosopher and a member of the Serbian Academy of Sciences and Arts. His mother, Nevenka, was a psychologist. His maternal grandfather and up to six other relatives were killed by the Croatian Ustaše during World War II.

The Tadićs are descendants of the Serb clan of Piva, in the region of Old Herzegovina, Montenegro. The family's slava (patron saint) is Saint John the Baptist. His parents frequently relocated between various cities and had moved to Sarajevo from Paris, where they pursued their doctoral studies, only a few days prior to his birth. Tadić and his family moved to Belgrade when he was three years old, and his father got a job at the newspaper Liberation (Oslobođenje).

Tadić finished Pera Popović Aga (today Mika Petrović Alas) elementary school and matriculated at the First Belgrade Gymnasium in Dorćol. During his teenage years he played water polo for VK Partizan, but had to quit due to injuries. He graduated from the University of Belgrade Faculty of Philosophy with a degree in psychology, specifically social psychology in the department of clinical psychology.

He was arrested during his studies in July 1982 for protesting the arrest of a group of students, arrested for protesting against martial law in Poland and in support of the Solidarity movement. Tadić spent one month in penal labour prison in Padinska Skela.

He worked as a journalist, military clinical psychologist and as a teacher of psychology at the First Belgrade Gymnasium. Until 2003, Tadić also worked at the Faculty of Dramatic Arts at the University of Arts in Belgrade as a lecturer of political advertising. He is a Senior Network Member at the European Leadership Network (ELN).

== Early political career ==
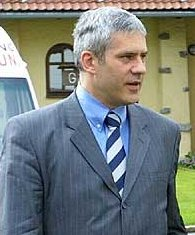
Tadić visiting George C. Marshall European Centre for Security Studies in Garmisch-Partenkirchen, 2003

Tadić joined the newly founded Democratic Party in 1990. He served as an MP and member of the parliamentary Science and Technology Committee following the 1993 Serbian parliamentary election.

Boris Tadić founded the Centre of Modern Skills (Centar modernih veština, CMV) in 1998, an NGO dealing with political and civic education, and the development of the political culture and dialogue.

The Democratic Party was part of the Democratic Opposition of Serbia (DOS), a grand coalition of anti-Milošević parties which played a key role in his downfall in 2000. Tadić was elected deputy leader of the Democratic Party twice, in February 2000 and then in October 2001.

Tadić served as Minister of Telecommunications in the Federal Republic of Yugoslavia from November 2000 to March 2003 and as Minister of Defence from March 2003 until he started his presidential campaign in April 2004. He served as an MP of the Democratic Party in the Chamber of Citizens of the Federal Assembly and later went on to be the acting parliamentary leader of the Democratic Opposition of Serbia coalition in 2003, the president of the Security Services Control Committee, as well as the parliamentary leader of the Democratic Party in the National Assembly of Serbia starting in February 2004.

The assassination of Zoran Đinđić in March 2003 led to a leadership convention of the Democratic Party in February 2004, which was won by Tadić against Zoran Živković. He was later reelected unopposed in regular leadership conventions in 2006 and 2010.

== Presidency ==
=== President of Serbia within state union (2004–2008) ===
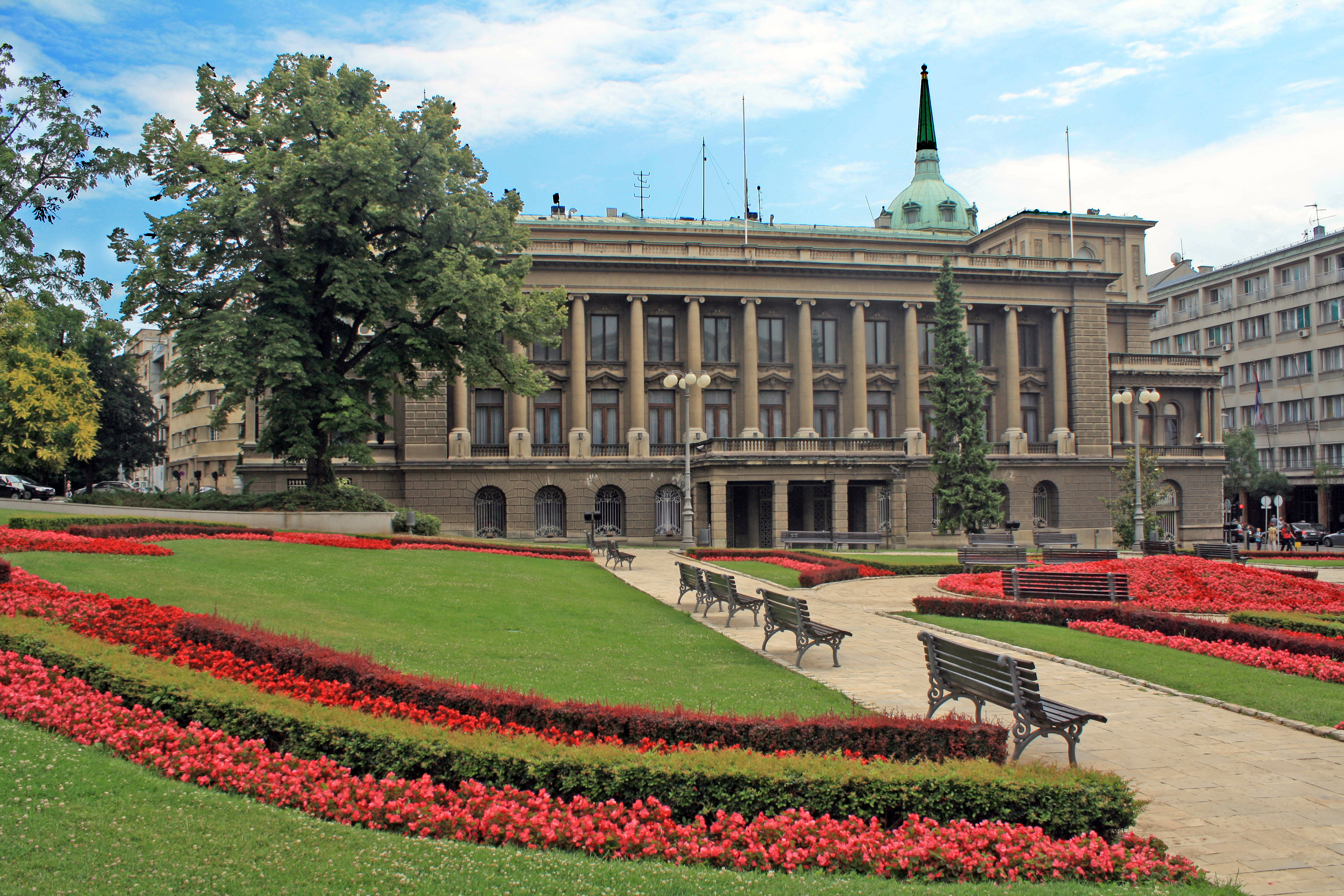
Novi dvor, the seat of the President of Serbia

Tadić, as the newly elected Democratic Party leader, was chosen as the candidate for the presidential election. He defeated Tomislav Nikolić of the nationalist Radical Party in the run-off of the 2004 presidential election with 53% of the vote. He was inaugurated on 11 July of that year.

During the 2004 election campaign, Tadić promised to form a new special institution called the People's Office. The People's Office of the President of the Republic was opened on 1 October 2004. The role of the People's Office is to make communication between the citizens and the President easier, and to cooperate between other state bodies and institutions, in order to enable the citizens of Serbia to exercise their rights. The People's Office of the President is divided into four divisions: Legal Affairs Division, Social Affairs Division, Projects Division and General Affairs Division. The first Director of the People's Office was Dragan Đilas. When he joined the Government of Serbia as the Minister in charge of the National Investment Plan in 2007, Tatjana Pašić became the new Director.

Tadić advocated cooperation and reconciliation of the former Yugoslav countries, strained by the burden of the Yugoslav Wars of the 1990s. On 6 December 2004, Boris Tadić made an apology in Bosnia and Herzegovina to all those who suffered crimes committed in the name of the Serbian people. In July 2005, Tadić visited the Bosnian town of Srebrenica on the 10th anniversary of massacre of 8,000 Muslim men and boys by Bosnian Serb forces. In 2007, Tadić issued an apology to Croatia for any crimes committed in Serbia's name during the war in Croatia.

Tadić presided during the independence referendum in Montenegro (2006). He was the first foreign head of state to visit Montenegro after it became independent on 8 June, and promised to continue friendly relations. Serbia declared independence as well, and Tadić attended the first raising of the flag of Serbia at the United Nations Headquarters in New York. Tadić became the first head of state of independent Serbia since King Peter I in 1918.

On 6 September 2007, Tadić was a signatory of the agreement that led to the formation of the Council for Cooperation between Serbia and Republika Srpska, together with Milorad Dodik and Vojislav Koštunica. In late 2007, he stated that Serbia does not support a break-up of Bosnia and Herzegovina and that, as a guarantor of the Dayton Accords that brought peace to Bosnia, he supports its territorial integrity. Tadić also said that Serbia supports the accession of Bosnia and Herzegovina to the EU, and NATO.

As President, Tadić has pursued a pro-Western foreign policy. On 28 September 2005, he met with Pope Benedict XVI in Vatican City, making him the first Serbian head of state to be granted an audience with a pope. This helped improve traditionally strained Catholic-Orthodox relations.

On 22 June 2007, Tadić presided over the 1000th meeting of the Council of Europe Committee of Ministers in Belgrade.

Contrary to his earlier decision in the 2004 Kosovan parliamentary election, Tadić stated that he had no right to call on Kosovo Serbs to vote in the 2007 Kosovo parliamentary election, as the standards he asked for in 2004 were not reached.

=== Reelection campaign ===
2008 reelection campaign logo

Boris Tadić has advocated an early presidential election that is required under constitutional law, since the adoption of the new Constitution of Serbia, after the successful constitutional referendum in October 2006. On 13 December 2007, the speaker of the Parliament, Oliver Dulić, set the election date for 20 January 2008. The Democratic Party submitted the candidacy of its leader to the Republic Electoral Commission on 21 December. Tadić held his first election convention on 22 December, in Novi Sad. The re-election campaign was led under the slogan ”For a strong and stable Serbia“ (За Јаку и Стабилну Србију) in the first round and "Let's win Europe together!" (Да освојимо Европу заједно!) in the second. Tadić advocated integration of Serbia into the European Union but also territorial integrity of Serbia with sovereignty over Kosovo and Metohija. As a part of a campaign, Boris Tadić answered the 10 most interesting questions every week through the campaign website in the form of video response on YouTube.

Tadić received support from G17 Plus and Sanjak Democratic Party, partners from the Government. He also received support of various national minority parties including Hungarian and Romani parties. He received 1,457,030 votes (35.39 per cent) in the first round. In the second round on 3 February 2008, he faced Tomislav Nikolić and won the election with 2,304,467 votes (50.31 per cent). After the election he assured Serbian citizens in Kosovo that they would never be betrayed.

=== President of Serbia (2008–2012) ===
Tadić was sworn in at the inauguration ceremony on 15 February 2008 in the National Assembly of Serbia.

The Assembly of Kosovo proclaimed a declaration of independence on 17 February 2008. Boris Tadić urged a United Nations Security Council meeting to react urgently and annul the act. He also said that Belgrade would never recognise the independence of Kosovo and would never give up the struggle for its legitimate interests. Russia backed Serbia's position and President Vladimir Putin said that any support for Kosovo's unilateral declaration is immoral and illegal.

On 21 February Tadić met President of Romania Traian Băsescu in Bucharest where he thanked him for Romanian support and stated that "Serbia will not give up its future in Europe".

Tadić said that Serbia would never recognise an independent Kosovo. He stated that the problem of Kosovo was not solved by the unilaterally declared independence and that the decade-long problems between Serbs and Albanians still exist. He called the international institutions to find a solution within the UN Security Council, for the continuation of negotiations. He also called a decision made by the US President George W. Bush to send arms to Kosovo "bad news".

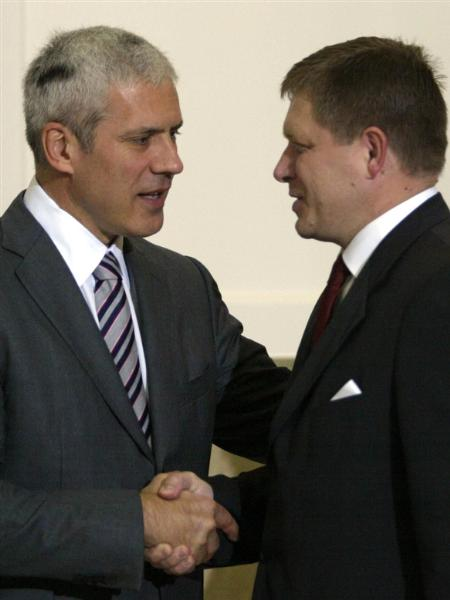
Boris Tadić with Slovak Prime Minister Robert Fico in Belgrade.

Tadić also said that Serbia would not accept the legality of the EU's planned policing and judiciary mission for Kosovo. On 25 February 2008, Boris Tadić met with Dmitry Medvedev and Sergei Lavrov in Belgrade where Medvedev stated that "We proceed from the understanding that Serbia is a single state with its jurisdiction spanning its entire territory, and we will adhere to this principled stance in the future, We have made a deal to coordinate together our efforts in order to get out of this complicated situation". Agreement on the South Stream pipeline was also signed during this visit.

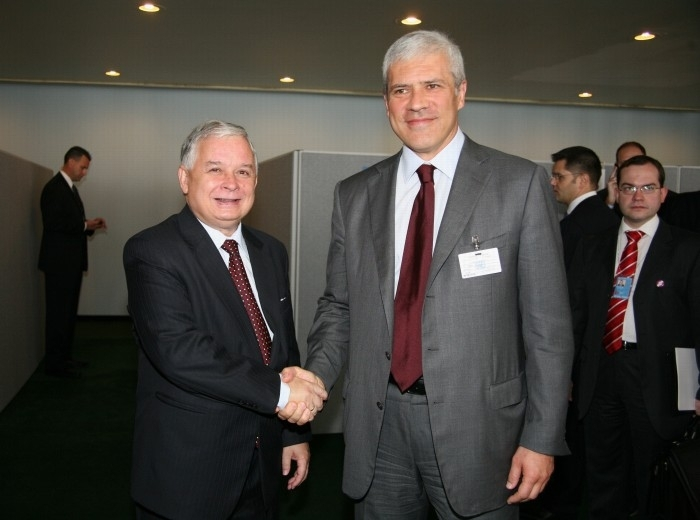
Meeting with Lech Kaczyński, late President of Poland, at the 63rd UN General Assembly session in September 2008

On 5 April 2008, Tadić called the acquittal of Ramush Haradinaj "disgraceful because of the innocent victims" and demanded the ICTY to appeal. He said that Serbia wishes to help the Tribunal to collect evidence "because Haradinaj’s place is in prison". He said that former Hague Chief Prosecutor Carla Del Ponte had said that witnesses in the case against Haradinaj had been intimidated and even murdered to prevent them testifying to his crimes.

Following the Republic of Kosovo's formation of the Kosovo Security Forces in January 2009, he sent protest letters both to the and NATO Secretaries-General. The letter states that Serbia views those forces as an illegal paramilitary organisation that constitutes a threat to the country's security and a danger to peace and stability in the Western Balkans. Tadić drew attention to the fact that the KSF were formed on the basis of the Ahtisaari Plan that was never adopted by the Security Council and added that the creation of these forces constitutes a breach of the Serbian Constitution and international law, which is why they should be disbanded. He called for the demilitarisation of Kosovo.

On 13 March 2008, President Tadić signed a decree dissolving the country's parliament and slating early parliamentary elections for 11 May. Boris Tadić gathered a large pro-EU coalition around his Democratic Party and G17 Plus for the Serbian parliamentary election in 2008, named “For a European Serbia – Boris Tadić". The coalition list was led by Dragoljub Mićunović and it also included Sanjak Democratic Party, Serbian Renewal Movement and League of Social Democrats of Vojvodina. The coalition won 38% of the vote, more than any other list. He condemnеd remarks regarding the election made by Javier Solana and Pieter Feith and called on the European Union not to interfere with Serbian elections.

Tadić said that he was ready, authorised as per Vienna Convention, to sign the Stabilisation and Association Agreement (SAA) with the European Union if it were offered on 28 April, but not at the price of recognising Kosovo's unilaterally declared independence. Tadić attended the signing of the SAA ceremony in Luxembourg on 29 April, where the Deputy Prime Minister Božidar Đelić signed the document on behalf of Serbia, as per the authorisation of the Government from December 2007. He was opposed by the then Prime Minister Vojislav Koštunica who believed that Serbia ought not to sign any agreements with the European Union. While, on 1 May, Koštunica said that Russian Foreign Minister Sergei Lavrov was right when he said that the SAA should have been signed, he nonetheless vowed to annul the agreement after the parliamentary elections, calling it "not in the service of Serbia's territorial integrity."

On 27 June 2008, Tadić named Mirko Cvetković for the new Prime Minister, following the victory of his party coalition in parliamentary election that took place in May. Cvetković was sworn in after giving the oath in the National Assembly on 7 July 2008.

Following the 2008 Russo-Georgian War, and Russian recognition of Abkhazia and South Ossetia, Tadić refused to follow suit, saying that even though he respects the Russian support to Serbia regarding Kosovo, "Serbia is not going to recognise these so-called new countries". He stated that "Serbia is not going to do something that is against our interest, because we are defending our territorial integrity and sovereignty by using international law" and that by constitution he must defend the interests of Serbia, and not the interests of any other country in the world.

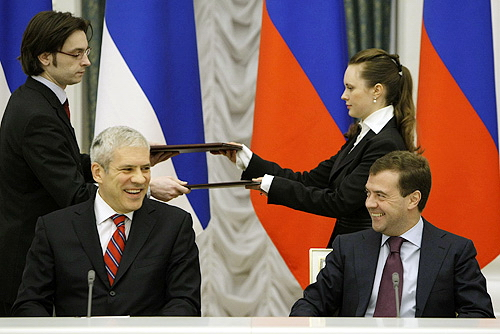
Boris Tadić and Dmitry Medvedev sealed the deal regarding the construction of a South Stream gas pipeline in December 2008

Tadić invoked his constitutional powers of Commander-in-Chief of the Serbian Armed Forces and dismissed the Chief of the General Staff Zdravko Ponoš on 30 December 2008. Ponoš made public accusations against the Defence Minister Dragan Šutanovac in the media. It was also revealed that he ignored the minister and has not submitted a single report in a year.

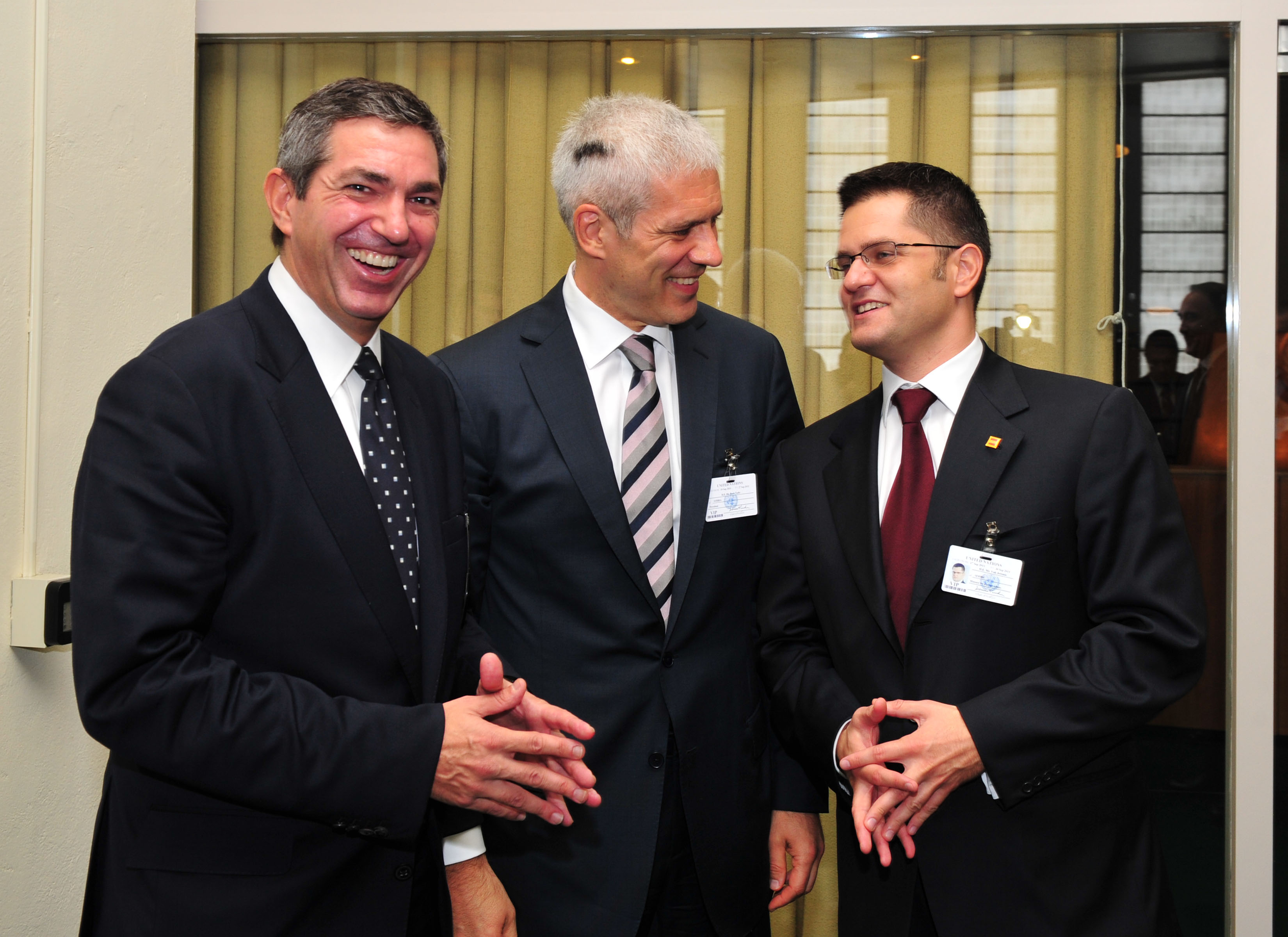
Foreign Minister of Greece Stavros Lambrinidis with Serbian President Boris Tadić and Foreign Minister of Serbia Vuk Jeremić

In April 2009, Tadić announced a constitutional reform proposal. His initiative includes the proposal to reduce the number of the National Assembly members from 250 to 150 to better reflect the size of the country followed by changes in law on party registration and financing in order to consolidate similar parties and limit those with little support which should bring Serbia closer to a two-party system. The second proposed amendment would change the administrative division of Serbia by dividing it into more autonomous regions in order to achieve a more balanced development. This change would lead to Serbia's being divided into seven regions instead of the current asymmetrical division which includes two autonomous provinces but where the majority of the territory has no special autonomy. However, the proposals haven't came to fruition.

During his visit to Serbia in May 2009, Lech Kaczyński, President of Poland, stated that he doesn't agree with the decision of the Polish Government to recognise the independence of Kosovo and that he as the President "favours the policy pursued by Serbian President Boris Tadić". They also discussed energy, particularly Europe's dependence on natural gas from just one source, and agreed that there is a need for a common EU energy policy that should also include the Balkan states.

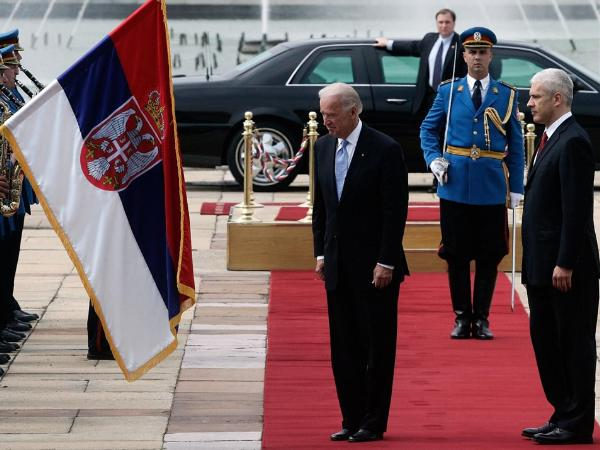
US Vice-president Joe Biden meets Tadić during the state visit to Serbia in May 2009

On 21 May 2009, Dragan Marić, a former businessman who was revolted over the court decision in his dispute with the national air carrier Jat Airways, entered the Presidency office carrying two hand grenades and seeking an out-of-court settlement signed by President or Government. Members of the Battalion of Military Police Cobras, providing security to the President of Serbia, managed to take one of the grenades immediately and isolate the attacker, however the perpetrator removed the pin from the second grenade and threatened to detonate it by releasing the lever. The negotiations were handled by the special team of the Serbian Ministry of Internal Affairs, supported by the officials of the Ministry of Justice, and lasted for several hours until the man was disarmed and arrested. After the incident, Tadić, who was present in the secured area of the building, congratulated the police and army special units, the security and negotiation team for doing a terrific job, peacefully and with no casualties and also said that problems, no matter what kind, cannot be resolved by force and by jeopardising citizens' lives.

In October 2009, after the Serbia national team qualified for the 2010 FIFA World Cup in South Africa, Tadić and other Serbian ministers celebrated at the end of the match in Belgrade's Red Star Stadium by toasting the winning team with a glass of champagne. It is illegal to consume alcohol at Serbian sporting events, in order to stop violence. Tadić pleaded guilty, saying "I did not know that consumption of alcohol, even if only for a toast, has been forbidden so I fully take responsibility for the violation" and was fined €400.

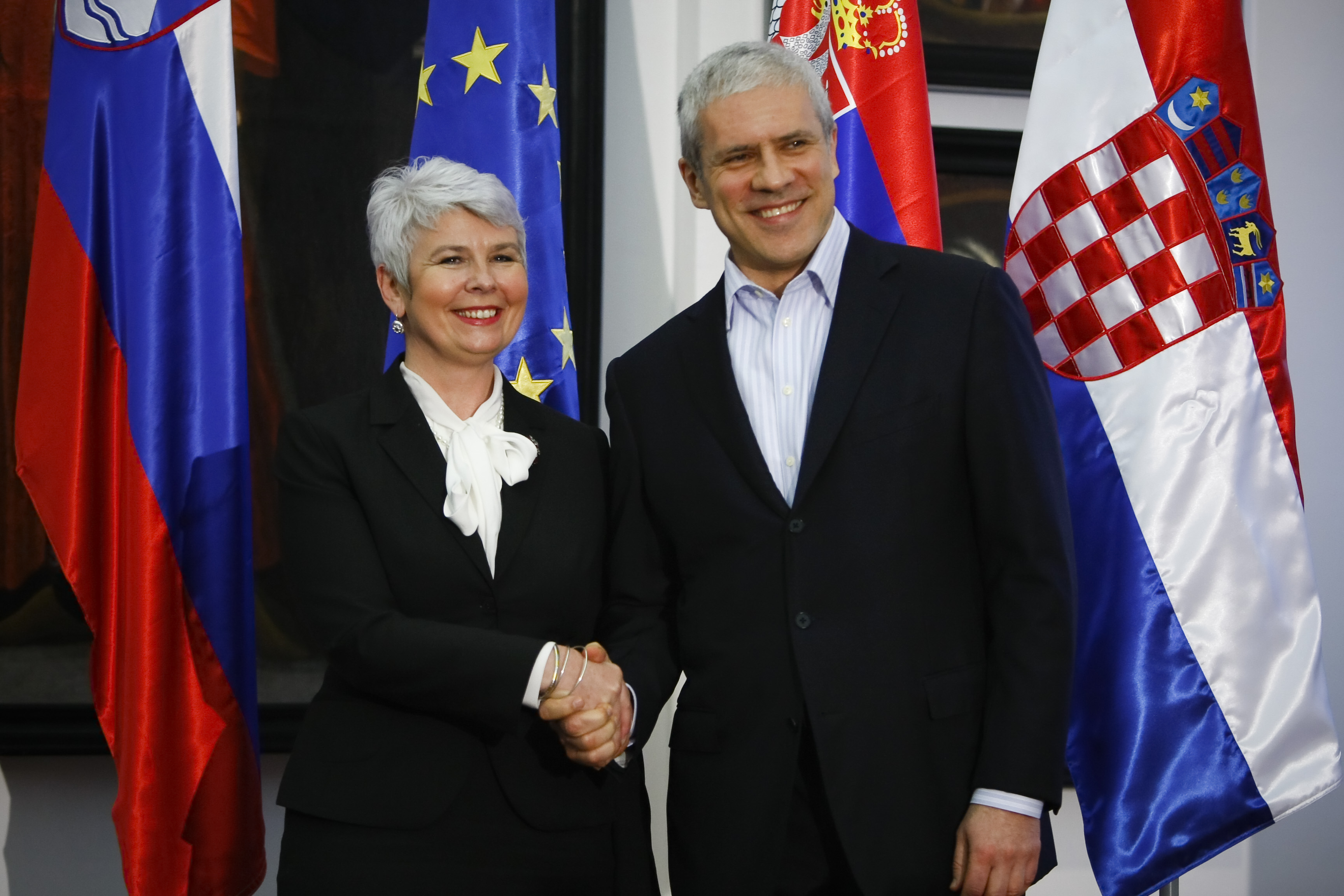
Tadić with Croatian Prime Minister Jadranka Kosor on 5 March 2010

Some observers have describe that the coalition government led by Tadić's Democratic Party introduced some media control mechanisms, which were further developed by the Aleksandar Vučić regime to severely curtail media freedom. Ljiljana Smajlović, editor-in-chief of Politika, has accused Tadić several times of pressuring editorial politics. Following his defeat at the 2012 presidential elections, Tadić and main opposition candidate Tomislav Nikolić had similar media coverage, but the campaign coverage was characterised by the lack of analytical and critical reporting, while some media outlets such as the weekly NIN and tabloid Blic showed a preference for Tadić.

=== Advisors ===
Advisors to the President of the Republic carry out the analytical, advisory and other corresponding tasks for the needs of the President of the Republic as well as other expert tasks in relations of the President with the Government and the Parliament.

Advisor	Portfolio
Gordana Matković	General Affairs
Trivo Inđić	Political Issues
Mlađan Đorđević	Legal Issues
Nebojša Krstić	Public Relations
Vojislav Brajović	Culture
Jovan Ratković	EU/NATO relations

Chief of Staff is Miodrag Rakić. Acting Secretary General of the Office of the President was Vladimir Cvijan from 2008 to 2010.

Previous advisors who served from 2005 to 2008 are Biserka Jevtimijević Drinjaković (economic issues), Vladimir Cvijan (legal issues) and Dušan T. Bataković and Leon Kojen (political issues). Most of the former advisors are now serving as directors of public enterprises and ambassadors.

== Post-presidency ==
=== 2012 elections and aftermath ===
On 5 April 2012, a day after announcing his decision, Tadić submitted his resignation to the speaker of parliament, Slavica Đukić-Dejanović, who then took over as acting president. This led to bringing forward the presidential election to coincide with the parliamentary election on 6 May.

Amid controversy regarding the legitimacy of the third mandate and the legality of certain decisions, incumbent Tadić lost the presidential elections to his opponent, Tomislav Nikolić from the Serbian Progressive Party. Nikolić won 49.7% of the votes in the runoff vote, versus 47% for Tadić, according to data from the Serbian Center for Free Elections and Democracy. The result was considered somewhat of a surprise, as Tadić had exploited his resignation for the presidential vote to coincide with parliamentary elections.

Tadić was criticised both inside and outside the party for the manoeuvre of calling early presidential elections without a clear goal, and entering them with over-confidence. Dragan Đilas, long-time mayor of Belgrade and one of rare Democrats who remained in his seat after 2012 elections, announced that he would challenge Tadić in December party elections. After a period of gauging the odds, it became obvious that Đilas would receive majority support. Before the electoral conference, Đilas and Tadić reached a face-saving agreement whereby Tadić would step down from the race and remain the party's honorary president, and Đilas thus became the only major candidate. Đilas was elected president of the Democratic Party on 25 November 2012.

=== New Democratic Party ===
In early 2014, after losing the internal reelections in the Democratic Party to Dragan Đilas, Tadić resigned from his position of honorary president and left the party. Subsequently, a number of prominent party members defected from the party and stated that they intend to form a list in the forthcoming parliamentary election with Tadić as its leader. A coalition was agreed upon with the League of Social Democrats of Vojvodina. A political party, named the New Democratic Party, was then formed and registered. In the same year the party was renamed Social Democratic Party (Serbia). In the 2023 Serbian parliamentary election, SDS took part as part of the Good Morning Serbia alliance.

== Policy and criticism ==
=== Coalition with the Socialist Party of Serbia ===
Following the 2008 election, Tadić's Democratic Party was unable to form a pro-European government with the hard-line Liberal Democratic Party. Faced with the possibility of a eurosceptic government led by the Democratic Party of Serbia, the Serbian Radical Party and the post-Milošević Socialist Party of Serbia (SPS), Tadić proposed a coalition with the SPS. On 7 June 2008 at an assembly of the Main Board of the Democratic Party, Tadić compared the DS and the SPS saying that both grieved over the loss of their presidents, Đinđić and Milošević. His address was heavily criticised by members of the Liberal Democratic Party, the League of Social Democrats of Vojvodina and the Social Democratic Union.

On 18 October 2008 Tadić and Ivica Dačić, President of the Socialist Party of Serbia, signed a Declaration of Political Reconciliation drafted in July, agreeing on further EU integration and negotiations with Kosovo based on UN Resolution 1244. The Declaration was again viewed as exonerating Milošević's regime and the G17 Plus, the Serbian Renewal Movement and League of Social Democrats of Vojvodina refused to sign it despite supporting the government. It was also criticised by the right-wing Dveri and the Serbian Radical Party who called the declaration a reconciliation of the two wings of the League of Communists who split at the 8th Session. Tadić defended the reconciliation after the 2012 presidential election reiterating that Serbia was in need of consensus-building policies.

=== Press freedom ===
In 2011 Report, the Freedom House described the media situation as generally free and stated that press operated with little government interference, although most media outlets are thought to be aligned with specific political parties. Some observers have describe that the coalition government led by Tadić's Democratic Party introduced some media control mechanisms, which were further developed by the Aleksandar Vučić regime to severely curtail media freedom. Media associations criticised the ruling coalition for adopting the controversial Law on Public Information proposed by the G17 Plus.

On 8 April 2011 the European Federation of Journalists wrote to Tadić that press freedom in Serbia was seriously compromised, that the safety of investigative journalists in Loznica and Belgrade was threatened and that independent newspapers were struggling against economic pressure and political interference, sometimes even against undue judiciary pressure through court decisions. The two main journalism associations and the journalists' union stated support for the letter. Ljiljana Smajlović, editor-in-chief of Politika, has accused Tadić several times of pressuring editorial politics.

In September 2011 the Anti-Corruption Council, led by Verica Barać and with the support of Commissioner for Information of Public Importance Rodoljub Šabić, Ombudsman Saša Janković, and presidents of the two main journalism associations Ljiljana Smajlović and Vukašin Obradović, published a report detailing the state of the freedom of the press in Serbia from January 2008 to June 2010. The Council concluded that the media in Serbia was overwhelmed by strong political pressure, that full control over the media was established, that no medium broadcast objective and complete information, and that events were censored or reported on selectively and incompletely. The report concluded that marketing agencies owned by senior Democratic Party officials and Tadić's close associates, namely Srđan Šaper and Dragan Đilas, held a significant share of the advertising market.

Following his defeat at the 2012 presidential elections, Tadić and main opposition candidate Tomislav Nikolić had similar media coverage, but the campaign coverage was characterised by the lack of analytical and critical reporting, while some media outlets such as the weekly NIN and tabloid Blic showed a preference for Tadić. On the other hand, the election observation organisations highlighted the many national-frequency televisions broadcast more affirmative content about the opposition parties.

== Personal life ==
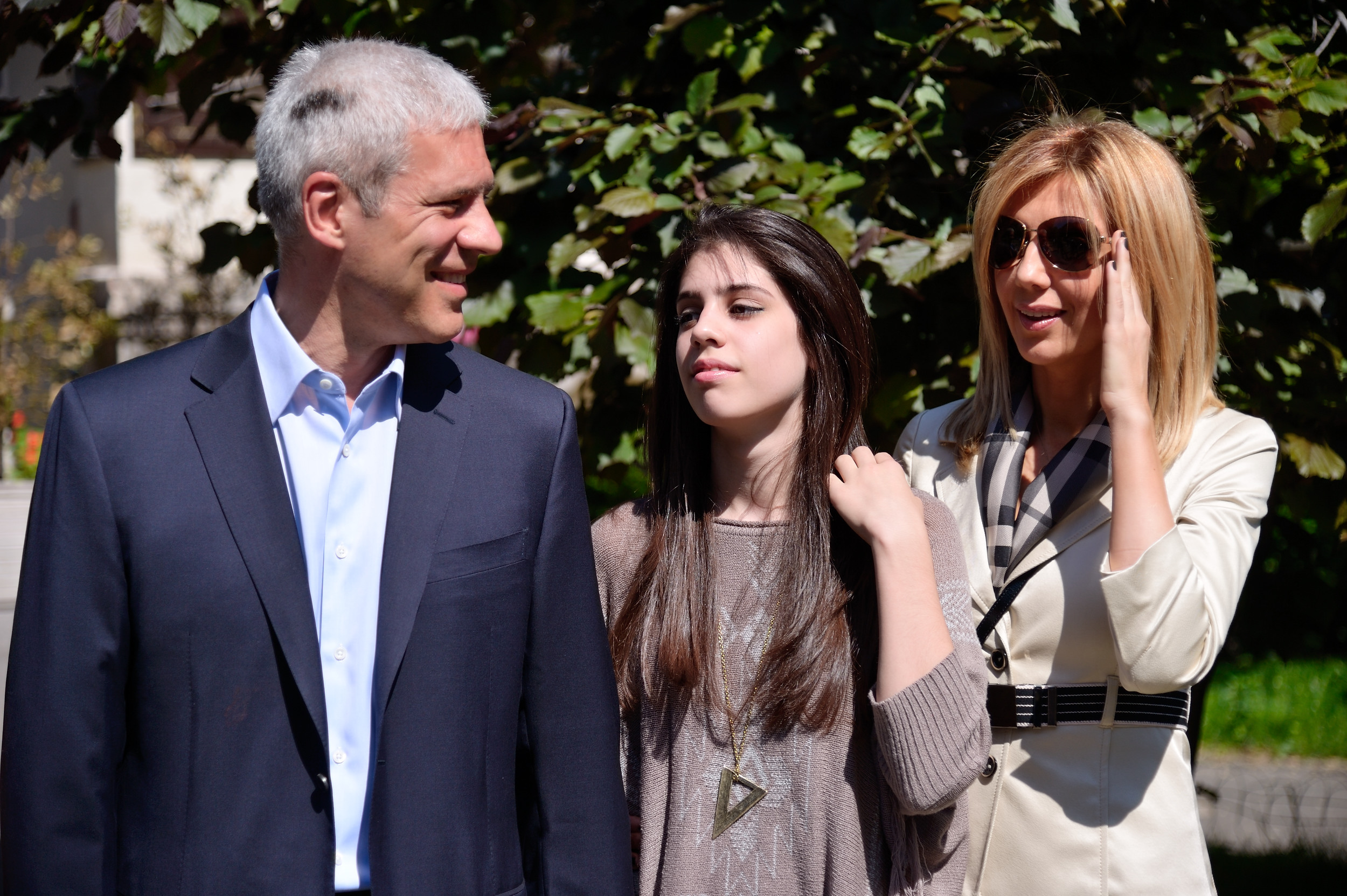
Tadić with his daughter and wife

Tadić's sister, Vjera, is a psychologist and currently teaches psychology in the First Belgrade Gymnasium. Besides his native language, Boris Tadić is reportedly fluent in English, French, Italian and German.

He was previously married to journalist Veselinka Zastavniković from 1980 to 1996, but they divorced, having had no children. They met in the 1970s. Throughout their marriage they were actively involved in various socio-political activities including protests and petitions against human-rights abuses and so-called 'verbal delict' in SFR Yugoslavia in the 1980s as well as anti-Milošević protests in the 1990s.

Tadić was married to Tatjana Rodić, with whom he has two daughters. The couple separated in 2019.

He is 6 feet 2 inches (188 cm) tall.

Tadić's maternal grandfather was Strahinja Kićanović, a wealthy tradesman and landowner who unsuccessfully ran twice for the office of member of parliament. He was killed during World War II at the Jadovno camp. Although this is today a well-known fact stated by Tadić on several occasions, Yugoslav communist authorities falsely listed Strahinja Kićanović as being killed simultaneously both at Jadovno and Jasenovac. This false claim was later even restated by institutions in Croatia and the United States.

== Honours and awards ==
On 4 August 2007, Tadić was awarded the European Prize for Political Culture that is given by the Swiss Foundation Hans Ringier of the Ringier Publishing House in Locarno. Previously it was awarded to Jean-Claude Juncker. Tadić decided to donate the financial part of the award for humanitarian purposes for the maternity hospital in a town near Gračanica.

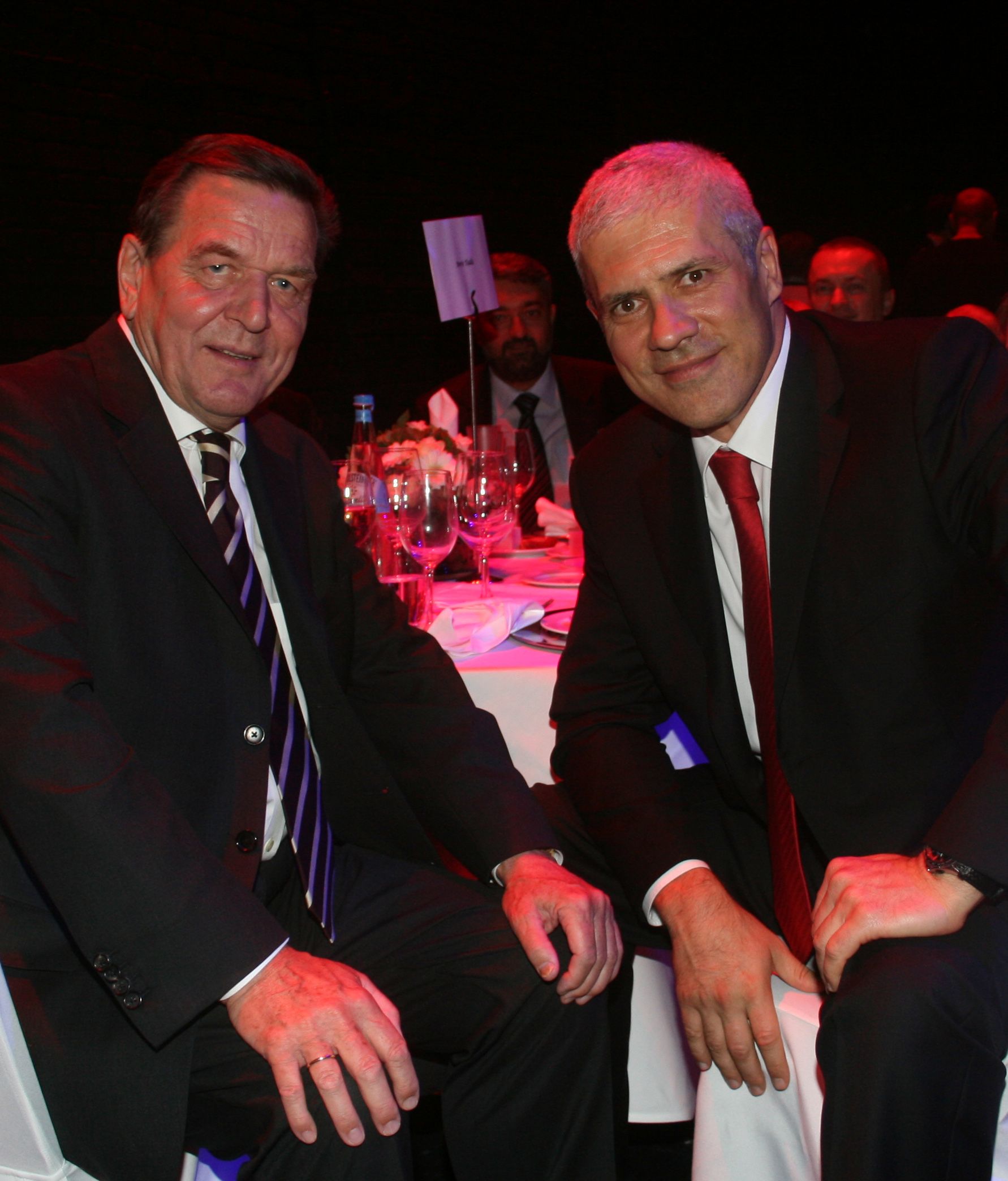
Boris Tadić attending Quadriga awards ceremony with Gerhard Schröder.

Tadić received the Quadriga award in September 2008, an annual German award sponsored by Werkstatt Deutschland, a non-profit organisation based in Berlin. The award recognises four people or groups for their commitment to innovation, renewal, and a pioneering spirit through political, economic, and cultural activities. The other three winners were Wikipedia, represented by Jimmy Wales; Eckart Höfling, Franciscan and director; and Peter Gabriel, musician and human rights activist. The award given to Tadić was named The Courage of Perseverance and was presented by Heinz Fischer, the Federal President of Austria. In March 2010, Tadić received the Steiger Award Europe of the Rhine-Ruhr for "respectfulness, openness, humanity, and tolerance".

In 2011, Tadić won the North-South Prize awarded by the Council of Europe and distinguishing his deep commitment and actions for the promotion and protection of human rights, defence of pluralist democracy, and the strengthening partnership of the north–south solidarity.

In 2012, in Brussels, Tadić, together with the ex-President of Croatia Ivo Josipović, was awarded the European Medal of Tolerance by the European Council on Tolerance and Reconciliation, in recognition of the Balkan statesmen's "significant contribution to promoting, seeking, safeguarding or maintaining Tolerance and Reconciliation on the European continent".

- European Prize for Political Culture by Ringier in 2007;
- Medal For the Contribution to the Victory from the Russian Federation in 2008;
- The Courage of Perseverance by Quadriga in 2008;
- Golden Keys of the City of Madrid in 2009;
- Honorary doctorate of Dimitrie Cantemir Christian University in 2009;
- 40 Years of Revolution Medal of Libya in 2009;
- Steiger Award of Rhine-Ruhr in 2010;
- Golden Medal of Hellenic Parliament in 2010;
- Jubilee Medal "65 Years of Victory in the Great Patriotic War 1941-1945" from the Russian Federation in 2010;
- North–South Prize of the Council of Europe in 2011;
- Order of the Republika Srpska of Republika Srpska in 2012; and
- Ilyas Afandiyev International Prize of Azerbaijan in 2012.
- European Medal of Tolerance by the European Council on Tolerance and Reconciliation in 2012.

Political offices
Preceded by Velimir Radojević	Minister of Defence of Serbia and Montenegro; 2003–2004	Succeeded by Prvoslav Davinić
Preceded by Predrag Marković; Acting	President of Serbia; 2004–2012	Succeeded by Slavica Đukić Dejanović; Acting
Party political offices
Preceded by Zoran Đinđić	President of the Democratic Party; 2004–2012	Succeeded by Dragan Đilas
New office	President of the Social Democratic Party; 2014–present	Incumbent
