= 2023 Serbian election protests =

- Part of 2023 Serbian parliamentary election and 2023 Belgrade City Assembly election
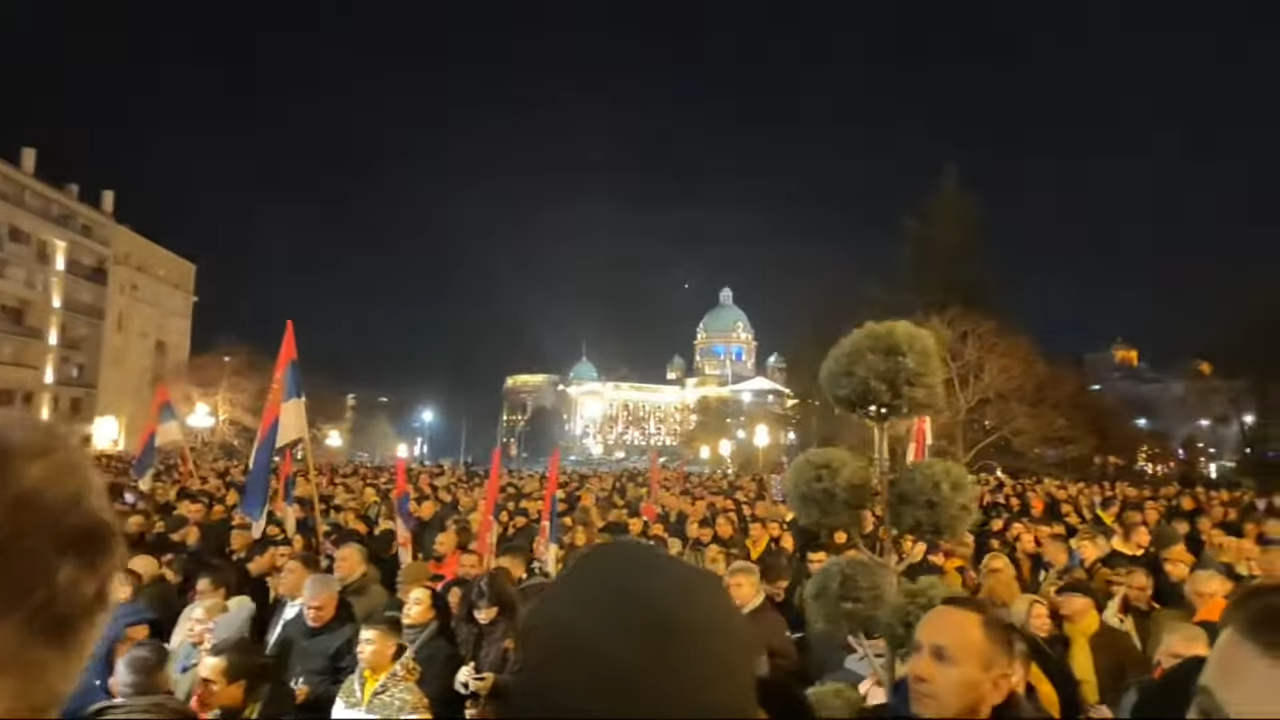
- Demonstrators on 24 December 2023
- Date: 18–30 December 2023 (1 week and 5 days)
- Location: Belgrade, Serbia
- Caused by: Suspected electoral fraud in the 2023 parliamentary and Belgrade City Assembly elections
- Goals: Annulment of the results of the 2023 elections
- Methods: Demonstrations; hunger strike; civil roadblocks; civil disorder; civil disobedience; riot (only on 24 December)
- Result: Protests failed: European Parliament adopts a resolution on the 17 December elections; New Belgrade City Assembly election called for 2 June; Defeat of the opposition in the 2 June elections

Parties
Anti-government protesters: Citizens; Opposition organisations: Serbia Against Violence; Students Against Violence/Struggle; ProGlas	Government of Serbia: Police; Government parties: Serbian Progressive Party; Socialist Party of Serbia

Lead figures
Dragan Đilas; Marinika Tepić; Miroslav Aleksić; Vladimir Obradović; Srđan Milivojević; Aleksandar Jovanović Ćuta; Radomir Lazović	Aleksandar Vučić; Ana Brnabić; Aleksandar Šapić; Bratislav Gašić

Casualties
- Injuries: 7 police officers severely injured
- Arrested: 38 protesters arrested

On 18 December 2023, a series of mass protests began in Belgrade, the capital of Serbia, after the parliamentary and Belgrade City Assembly elections on 17 December. The protests were organised by the opposition Serbia Against Violence (SPN) coalition, the Students Against Violence (later Struggle) youth organisation, and the ProGlas initiative.

According to monitoring and non-governmental organisations, such as CeSID, CRTA, and the Office for Democratic Institutions and Human Rights, the election day was marked with electoral fraud, with irregularities such as vote buying, ballot-box stuffing, Bulgarian train, and group voting occurring. The ruling Serbian Progressive Party (SNS) denied all the allegations. In Belgrade, the election also resulted in a hung parliament, considering that no side had a majority to form a government. During the protests, the organisers called for the annulment of the results. Seven representatives of the SPN were also on hunger strike during the protests, with Marinika Tepić being the longest one, totaling 13 days. On 24 December, a riot broke out after an unsuccessful attempt by opposition councillors to enter the building of the City Assembly of Belgrade.

The protests lasted until 30 December; at that point, all seven representatives of the SPN ended their hunger strike. Two minor protests were also held in January 2024. The protests received criticism from the government and Russia, either comparing the protests to Euromaidan or alleging that Western powers supported the protests. After the protests, the European Parliament adopted a resolution on the 17 December elections, calling for an international investigation due to the fraud, while the City Assembly of Belgrade failed to constitute and a new election was organised for 2 June 2024. The opposition lost, while the ruling SNS regained its majority in the body.

== Background ==
In May 2023, a school shooting happened in the Vračar municipality of Belgrade, the capital of Serbia, followed by a mass murder in the villages of Dubona, Mladenovac and Malo Orašje, Smederevo. Mass protests, named Serbia Against Violence, began shortly after the shootings. Organisers demanded the resignation of government ministers, halting and cancelling the broadcast of reality programs and shows that promote violence on television with a national frequency, banning print media whose content promotes violence, publishes fake news, and violates the Journalistic Code, and confiscating the national frequency of Pink and Happy television channels. These protests lasted until November 2023.

Opposition parties organising the protests formed the Serbia Against Violence (SPN) coalition for the parliamentary, Vojvodina provincial, and Belgrade City Assembly elections, which were scheduled for 17 December 2023. According to reports of those who monitored the elections, including CeSID, CRTA, and Kreni-Promeni organisations, the elections on 17 December were marked by electoral fraud. Domestic and international observers reported irregularities such as vote buying and ballot-box stuffing. The Organization for Security and Co-operation in Europe (OSCE) stated that the electoral campaign was characterised by "harsh rhetoric, bias in the media, pressure on public sector employees, and misuse of public resources". The Belgrade City Assembly election did not have a winner due to Branimir Nestorović's We – Voice from the People organisation unexpectedly gaining representation in the body; neither the government and the opposition won a majority.

The Office for Democratic Institutions and Human Rights (ODIHR) concluded that SNS had a "systematic advantage that created unfair conditions in the elections" (imala sistematsku prednost koja je stvorila nepravedne uslove na izborima) and that Aleksandar Vučić, the president of Serbia, heavily dominated the election campaign, despite not being a candidate in it. Stefan Schennach, the chief of the delegation of Parliamentary Assembly of the Council of Europe that monitored the elections, said that "the elections were not fair" (to nisu bili fer izbori) and that "the victory in Belgrade was stolen from the opposition" (da je pobeda u Beogradu ukradena opoziciji). Vučić and SNS denied all allegations of electoral fraud. Ana Brnabić, the prime minister of Serbia, accused the opposition and CRTA of "destabilising the country and the constitutional order of the Republic of Serbia" (destabilizuju zemlju i uruše ustavni poredak Republike Srbije).

== Timeline ==
=== First week ===
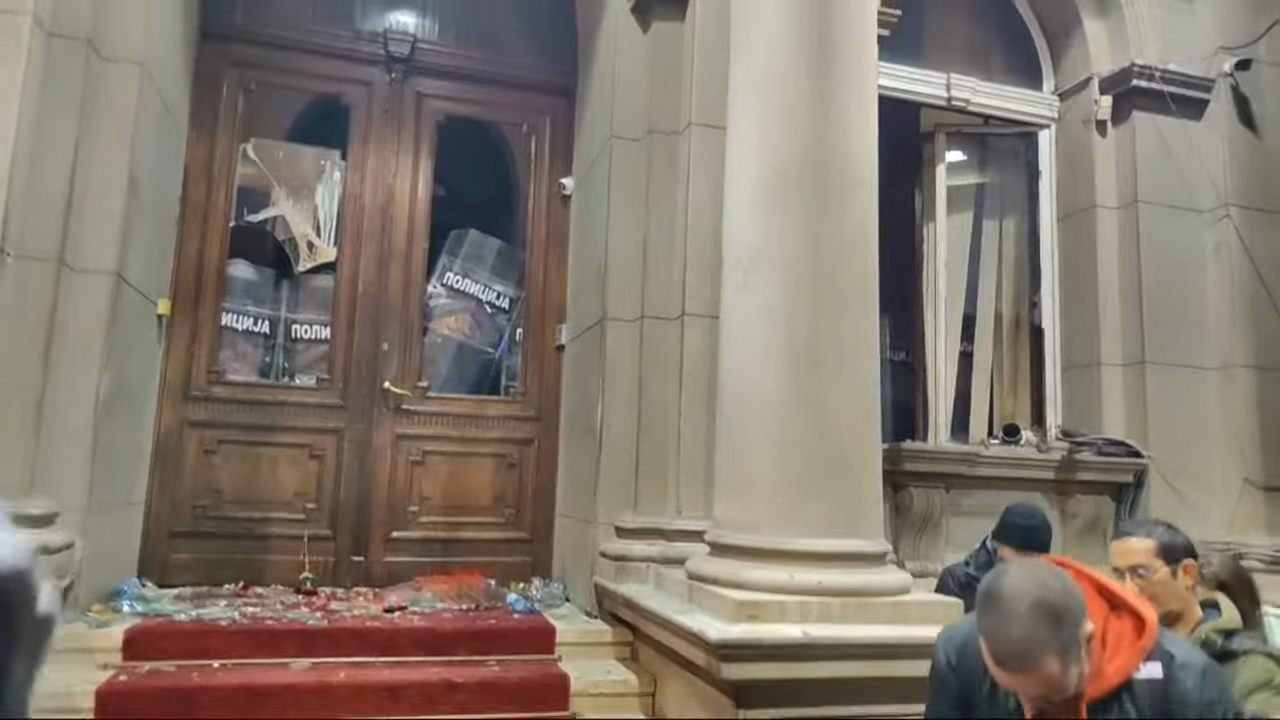
Riots took place outside the City Assembly of Belgrade on 24 December

The first protest was organised by SPN outside of the building of the Republic Electoral Commission (RIK) on 18 December. At the protest, SPN announced that they would reject the Belgrade City Assembly election results, citing irregularities that took place during the election. They also demanded the annulment of the election results and the "cleaning" (čišćenje) and updating of the voter list. Marinika Tepić and Miroslav Aleksić, the main representatives of SPN, announced that they would go on a hunger strike until their demands were accepted; Aleksić, however, later announced that he would go on a "strict fast" (strogom postu) instead of a hunger strike. Tepić continued her hunger strike inside the RIK building. The protest had incidents; a group of demonstrators that gathered at the protest threw eggs, tomatoes, and toilet papers at the RIK building. Miladin Kovačević, the director of the Republic Bureau of Statistics, was also physically attacked by a demonstrator. The police heavily guarded the building during the protest.

Protests continued to be organised by SPN outside the RIK building; they were also joined by the Students Against Violence organisation, which renamed itself Struggle (Borba) amidst the protests. The second protest was attended by former rector of the University of Belgrade Ivanka Popović, judge Miodrag Majić, and actors Svetlana Bojković and Dragan Bjelogrlić, all of whom initiated the ProGlas activist group during the 2023 election campaign, to boost the turnout of the elections. At the third protest, held on 20 December, SPN expanded their demands by calling for the annulment of all elections held on 17 December. Members of the National Assembly of Serbia Jelena Milošević and Danijela Grujić began a hunger strike at the protest on 21 December. At the same protest, SPN representatives called for the European Union to not accept the results and conduct an international investigation. Besides the protest in Belgrade, there was also a protest in Niš on 22 December. Janko Veselinović and Željko Veselinović also began a hunger strike on 22 December. At the protest a day later, Branko Miljuš and Dušan Nikezić, who were elected to the National Assembly in the 2023 election on behalf of SPN, also began a hunger strike.

According to the Archive of Public Gatherings, which is presided over by journalist Aleksandar Gubaš, the protest on 24 December was attended by approximately 7,100 demonstrators; Vučić claimed that only 2,490 demonstrators were present at the protest. The protest was announced by Aleksić two days prior due to the deadline for the annulment of the election results. The protest began again in front of the RIK building, where Tepić, Aleksić, Srđan Milivojević, and Aleksandar Jovanović Ćuta gave their speeches. Aleksić called for the demonstrators to circle the building of the City Assembly of Belgrade while Vladimir Obradović, a member of the Temporary Council of Belgrade, (Note: The Temporary Council of Belgrade is a body of politicians that collectively rule over Belgrade when the position of mayor of Belgrade is vacant.) and other councillors would enter the building to give a speech from a balcony inside the building. However, the building was under armed guard by the police and gendarmery, which did not allow Obradović, Aleksić, and Milivojević to peacefully enter the building.

A group of demonstrators set off a riot at the protest, and they tried to enter the building violently. In response to the attempt to enter the building of the City Assembly of Belgrade, Vučić issued an urgent statement, describing it as an attempt to overthrow the government. Police brutality was seen later in the protest; the police and gendarmery attacked demonstrators and used tear gas, pepper spray, and batons. Out of opposition representatives, Ćuta was hit with tear gas, while Radomir Lazović and Željko Vagić, the president of the Grocka Party of Freedom and Justice (SSP) board, were attacked by the gendarmery. Aleksandar Šapić, the president of the Temporary Council of Belgrade and former mayor of Belgrade, gave a press conference inside the City Assembly building once the protest ended, where he condemned the riot.

Dragan Đilas, the president of SSP, claimed that the rioters were sent by a group of convicted criminal Đorđe Prelić; Đilas also alleged that Šapić had connections to Prelić, though Šapić denied this. The head of the Police Administration, Ivica Ivković, accused SPN of being behind the riot. Ivković reported that 38 demonstrators were arrested, and the Ministry of Internal Affairs informed that 7 police officers were injured. The Lawyers' Committee for Human Rights alleged that the police disproportionately threatened the demonstrators. The Higher Court in Belgrade later reported that 7 of the arrested pled guilty to violently entering the building of the City Assembly of Belgrade. One of the arrested received a 6-month prison suspended sentence in January 2024.

=== Second week ===
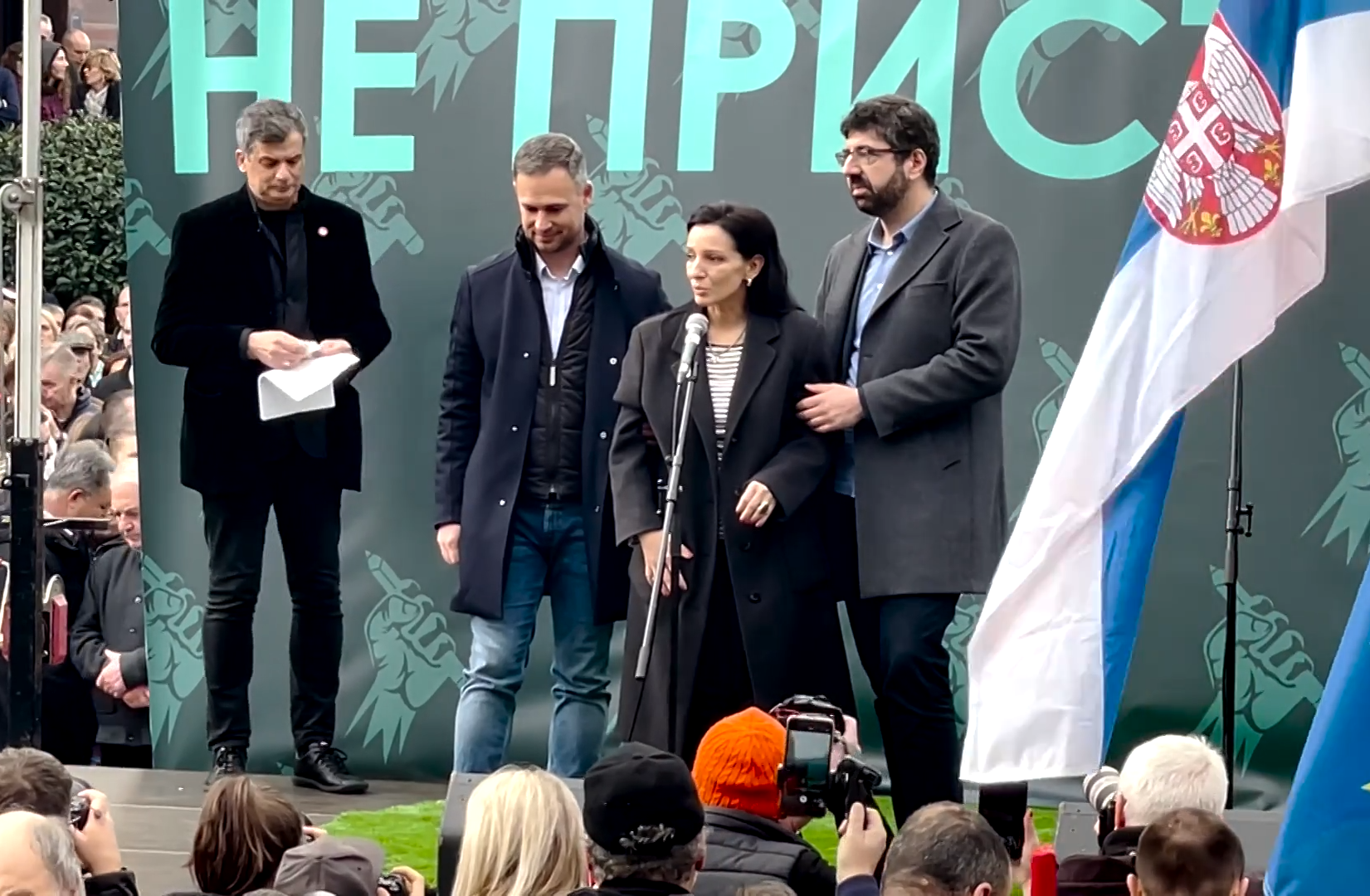
Opposition politician Marinika Tepić (pictured at the 30 December protest) was on hunger strike from 18 to 30 December

Roadblocks organised by the Struggle organisation were held in front of the building of the Ministry of Public Administration and Local Self-Government (MDULS) and later in Kneza Miloša Street on 25 December. This protest received support from 345 professors and associates from the University of Belgrade and University of Novi Sad, and the Network of Academic Solidarity and Engagement organisation. While protesting in Knez Miloša Street, a group of demonstrators played football and volleyball on the road, while some also danced kolo. Another protest organised by SPN was held later the same day, in front of the building of RIK. Tepić was unable to attend the protest due to her worsening health situation, caused by the hunger strike. Demonstrators marched towards the Belgrade Police Department during the protest, where they demanded the release of arrested demonstrators. Opposition politicians were not allowed to enter the building. Late in the protest, N1 journalist Mladen Savatović was physically attacked by an unknown man. The attacker, later identified as a man who had previously demolished a car during the protest, was later arrested.

A day later, SPN organised another protest, this time marching towards the building of the Higher Court in Belgrade. Željko Veselinović ended his hunger strike on 27 December and a day later Grujić and Janko Veselinović did the same, all due to their doctor's advice. Struggle organised another protest in front of the MDULS building on 27 December, demanding that the voter list should made public. The demonstrators later marched through Knez Mihailova Street and to the Faculty of Philosophy of the University of Belgrade. Later that day, SPN organised another protest in front of RIK, then marched towards the building of the Radio Television of Serbia (RTS). This protest was repeated a day later by SPN.

Struggle organised a 24-hour blockade of Kneza Miloša Street, beginning on 29 December. No incidents were reported during the blockade. On 30 December, ProGlas organised another protest, this time at the Terazija Fountain, in front of the Hotel Moskva. Alongside the Serbian media, The Independent, a British online newspaper, broadcast the protest on its website. The protest was also attended by demonstrators from the Struggle organisation. At the protest, Tepić demanded the annulment of the election results, after which she was driven away to a hospital for treatment, ending her hunger strike. On the same day, Milošević and Miljuš also ended their hunger strike. According to the Archive of Public Gatherings, about 17,000 demonstrators were present at its height at the 30 December protest.

Despite SPN announcing that the protests would continue regularly after Orthodox Christmas (7 January), SPN only organised two protests since then, on 16 and 26 January.

== Reactions ==
=== Domestic reactions ===
==== Government ====
Vladimir Dimitrijević, the president of RIK, said that RIK and the Belgrade City Election Commission do not have the right to annul the Belgrade City Assembly elections and that they could instead only annul the results at certain voting stations. MDULS also said that the voter list is up-to-date and rejected the claim that "phantom voters" (fantomski glasači) (Note: Phantom voters are a type of voters that are listed in the voter list but do not reside at the listed location, thus they cannot legally vote in the municipality or the city that is mentioned in the list.) exist. Despite the criticism from the opposition, RTS also claimed that they were covering the protests in their normal fashion.

Commenting on Tepić's hunger strike, Vučić said that "she is free to stop her hunger strike and get back to her duties" (slobodno mogu da prestanu i da se vrate svojim obavezama). During the 24 December protest, Ivica Dačić, the deputy prime minister and president of the Socialist Party of Serbia (SPS), condemned the riots outside the City Assembly of Belgrade. Šapić said that the election protests "are the beginning of a civil war" (uvod u građanski rat) and compared them to Euromaidan. Brnabić also compared the protests to Euromaidan. The government denied that police brutality took place.

Vučić commented on 27 December that he does not fear the opposition, the protests, or the "fabricated and agreed-upon reports of election observers, which claim that there were massive irregularities" (izmišljenih i dogovorenih izveštaja posmatrača izbora, koji tvrde da su postojale ogromne nepravilnosti). He also said that "[the government] will not let them steal the will of the people" (nećemo im dati da ukradu narodnu volju). He later alleged that the protests hurt the tourism sector.

==== Opposition ====
Besides SPN, opposition parties and coalitions such as the National Democratic Alternative (NADA), People's Party, Social Democratic Party, and Dveri rejected the 2023 election results. Miloš Jovanović, one of the representatives of the NADA coalition, expressed his support for holding new elections and said that citizens have a right to resist and organise peaceful protests.

=== Foreign reactions ===
The protests were strongly criticised by Russia. Dmitry Peskov, the press secretary of Vladimir Putin, accused foreign powers of staging the protests in Belgrade, while Maria Zakharova, the spokesperson of the ministry of foreign affairs of Russia, accused "the West of setting a fire to the already tense enough political situation in Serbia" (Zapad pokušava da potpali već dovoljno napetu političku situaciju u Srbiji). Brnabić thanked the Russian Federal Security Service for providing information to the government of Serbia. After Vučić's meeting with Russian ambassador Alexander Bocan Harchenko on 25 December, Bocan Harchenko said that Vučić informed him that "the incitement to riots came from the West" (zapad stoji iza jučerašnjih nereda). Sergey Lavrov, the Russian minister of foreign affairs, also claimed that "the West tried to organise an illegal change of government" (Zapad pokušao da organizuje nelegalno preuzimanje vlasti). The New York Times journalist Andrew Higgins saw the involvement of Russia as an attempt to bring Serbia closer to Russia.

The European Union condemned the violence that took place during the protest on 24 December and called for the government to investigate the irregularities that took place during the elections. Matthew Miller, the spokesperson for the United States Department of State, also called on Serbia to investigate the irregularities. Responding to Russia's allegations, Christopher R. Hill, the United States Ambassador to Serbia, said that "no one is inciting a revolution".

== Aftermath ==
Following the protests, the European Parliament held a session on 17 January, during which the 17 December elections in Serbia were discussed. Didier Reynders, the European Commissioner for Justice, condemned the violence that took place during the protests and said that he expects the government of Serbia to implement the recommendations for electoral conditions. Andreas Schieder, who took part in the monitoring mission on 17 December, confirmed that irregularities took place. The European Parliament adopted the resolution regarding the irregularities during the 17 December elections, with 461 in favour, 53 against, and 43 absent. The resolution called for an international investigation of the results, for the European Commission to follow the reports of the Court of Auditors and to immediately start an audit of the funds provided to the Government of Serbia. The resolution also stated that if the government of Serbia did not accept key reforms to electoral conditions, European Union funding for Serbia should be suspended.

ODIHR published its report on the 17 December elections in February 2024, calling for inter-party dialogues between the government and the opposition in order to improve legislative changes before the next election. ODIHR concluded that various irregularities took place, such as vote buying, the Bulgarian train, and group voting.

In Belgrade, the first attempt to constitute the City Assembly occurred on 19 February. But it failed because the quorum was not met, as the councillors from the SNS electoral list were not present. The second attempt occurred on 1 March; the quorum was not met again. The third, final, and unsuccessful attempt occurred on 3 March. As the City Assembly did not get constituted, a new election had to be called. Brnabić, who became the president of the National Assembly after the 2023 parliamentary election, called the elections to be held on 2 June. In this election, SNS and SPS took part on a historical joint list, while the SPN remained divided; SSP, Serbia Centre, and Together boycotted the elections, while the rest of the SPN parties took part under the We Choose Belgrade (BB) banner. The elections were a loss for the opposition; SNS regained its majority back in the City Assembly and BB only won 14 seats. While the popular vote of the SPN coalition in the 2023 election was 325,000, BB only secured 89,000 votes in the 2024 election. On the other hand, Kreni-Promeni, which took part in the election for the first time, managed to win more votes and seats than BB. Šapić was re-elected mayor on 24 June.
