= Platform for a European Serbia =

Political coalition in Serbia

Platform for a European Serbia Платформа за европску Србију
- Abbreviation: PES
- Ballot holders: Marinika Tepić; Zdravko Ponoš
- Founded: 19 June 2026
- Ideology: Pro-Europeanism
- National Assembly: 0 / 250

Website
- evropskasrbija.rs

The Platform for a European Serbia (Serbian: Платформа за европску Србију, Platforma za evropsku Srbiju, abbr. PES) is a political coalition in Serbia composed of pro-European opposition political parties. Founded in June 2026, its members include the Party of Freedom and Justice, Serbia Centre, and Goran Ješić's Solidarity. The coalition stems from the cooperation of five political parties that began in December 2025 and that was reduced to three parties and a political movement. The Movement of Free Citizens was also a founding member until it left the coalition in September 2026, expressing its support for the Student List.

== History ==
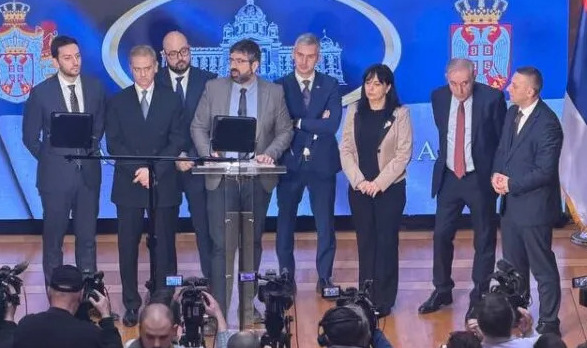
Representatives of the EU5 coalition in January 2026

Several opposition parties, namely the People's Movement of Serbia (NPS), Movement of Free Citizens (PSG), Serbia Centre (SRCE), Party of Freedom and Justice (SSP), and the Green–Left Front (ZLF) signed a document inside the offices of the European Movement in Serbia in December 2025, pledging coordination regarding the process of accession of Serbia to the European Union. They claimed that the incumbent government was anti-European. Biljana Đorđević from ZLF said that they wanted the European Parliament to know that "the Serbian Progressive Party does not represent all citizens of Serbia" (da Srpska napredna stranka ne predstavlja sve građane Srbije). Srđan Milivojević, the president of the Democratic Party (DS), criticised the coordination, saying that the only pro-European choice is to support the Student List.

The five opposition parties met with European Parliament representatives in January 2026, holding a meeting together. A month later, the European Democratic Party expressed support for the cooperation of the five parties. The representatives of the five parties later met with the European Democratic Party in March, and with officials from Germany, Sweden, and Spain in April. While Miroslav Aleksić from NPS expressed his support for the creation of one electoral list with the Student List, Zdravko Ponoš from SRCE said that in absence of one, the pro-European parties should run with their own electoral list. By this point, the cooperation was termed as the informal coalition ProEU5 or EU5; the name was created by Ponoš.

After ZLF expressed their support for the Student List in May, stating that they would not participate in the upcoming parliamentary elections if they were to be held during the summer of 2026, their membership in the informal coalition was questioned, with Vojin Radovanović from Insajder saying that the coalition was reduced to EU4. Soon after, a meeting between the remaining four parties was held; ZLF did not participate. In June, Dragan Đilas, the president of SSP, said that his party would participate in the parliamentary elections with pro-European parties, naming the parties from EU5, except ZLF, and including Ecological Uprising (EU), while also seeing Goran Ješić's Solidarity as a potential coalition member. Đilas has also said that the coalition is in favour of cooperation with the Student List. PSG has, however, announced that they will decide whether to participate or not in the parliamentary elections once they are called by the president of Serbia.

On 19 June, SRCE, PSG, SSP, and Ješić's Solidarity founded the Platform for a European Serbia (PES) coalition inside the offices of the European Movement in Serbia. They stated that they are open to incorporating more members into the coalition who share pro-European values. Stefan Janjić of SRCE declined describing PES as a coalition and said that they retain cooperation with EU, ZLF, and NPS. In a June opinion poll conducted by Faktor Plus, 4.5% of the respondents said that they would vote for the coalition, while in a July poll conducted by Nova srpska politička misao, 4.2% of the respondents said that they would vote for the coalition.

In September, PSG left the coalition in September and announced its support for the Student List. PES also announced that it would participate in the parliamentary elections. PES submitted its electoral list on 19 September under the name "European Serbia". While they had collected signatures, several officials, such as Borko Stefanović, Jelena Milošević, Peđa Mitrović, and Mila Popović, refused to appear on the electoral list, while two members of the SRCE presidency left the party in protest of the party's participation in the elections. Several city boards of SRCE had insisted that their party should support the Student List instead, however, Ponoš refused to do it. Ponoš said that the National Assembly would lose a pro-European voice without their participation. RIK proclaimed their list on 20 September. The ballot holders of the list are Marinika Tepić and Ponoš.

== Ideology and platform ==
Đilas said that their political programme is based off Forward to Europe, saying that they oppose crime and corruption, while supporting the accession of Serbia to the European Union and the improvement of education and health services. Tepić said that their coalition would campaign on issues related to the European Union.

== Members ==
Name	Leader	Seats before the election
Party of Freedom and Justice (SSP)	Dragan Đilas	12 / 250
Serbia Centre (SRCE)	Zdravko Ponoš	8 / 250
Solidarity (Note: Not to be confused with the orginal Solidarity Platform, which ran in elections with We Must and Serbia Against Violence. This organisation expressed its support for the Student List.)	Goran Ješić	0 / 250

== Electoral performance ==
=== Parliamentary elections ===
National Assembly of Serbia
Year	Leader	Popular vote	% of popular vote	#	# of seats	Seat change	Status
2026	Marinika Tepić; Zdravko Ponoš	12,570	0.29%	▼10th	0 / 250	▼20	Extra-parliamentary
