= United Opposition of Serbia =

Political coalition in Serbia

United Opposition of Serbia Удружена опозиција Србије
- Abbreviation: UOPS
- Representatives: Dragan Đilas; Marinika Tepić; Vuk Jeremić; Zoran Lutovac
- Founded: 10 August 2020
- Dissolved: 21 January 2021
- Preceded by: Alliance for Serbia
- Succeeded by: United for the Victory of Serbia
- Colours: Red; Blue; Grey

The United Opposition of Serbia (Serbian Cyrillic: Удружена опозиција Србије, romanised: Udružena opozicija Srbije, abbr. UOPS) was a political coalition in Serbia.

It was formed in August 2020 as the direct successor of Alliance for Serbia (SzS). The coalition included 11 parties and movements, including Đorđe Vukadinović as an independent individual. UOPS operated as a "confederation of political parties" and was the subject of inter-coalition conflicts. It positioned itself as a coalition that opposed Aleksandar Vučić and sought to form a "democratic society" and free and fair elections, while it also supported the accession of Serbia to the European Union.

The dissolution of UOPS was triggered in December 2020, after the Party of Freedom and Justice (SSP) and Democratic Party (DS) sought to form a joint platform for the inter-party dialogues on electoral conditions with the Movement of Free Citizens (PSG). The People's Party (Narodna) opposed this move since PSG had participated in the 2020 parliamentary election, which was boycotted by members of UOPS. The coalition was dissolved by January 2021, after which SSP and NS had formed two separate blocs. The parties later formed the United for the Victory of Serbia (UZPS) coalition in November 2021, which took part in the 2022 general election.

== History ==
=== Background and formation ===
The Alliance for Serbia (SzS) was formed shortly before the beginning of the 2018 protests, with Dragan Đilas as its initiator. It played a significant role in Serbian politics during its existence, since it consisted of major opposition political parties. SzS boycotted the 2020 parliamentary election. Shortly after the election, speculations rose about its potential dissolution, which was confirmed to be true by its members in August 2020. The Party of Freedom and Justice (SSP), People's Party (Narodna), and the Democratic Party (DS) stated that they would remain in the coalition, while Dveri opted to leave, but continue the cooperation on a "technical level".

The United Opposition of Serbia (UOPS) was officially formed on 10 August 2020. The agreement was signed by 11 political organisations in total, including Đorđe Vukadinović, an independent politician. During the press conference, Janko Veselinović stated the coalition would not cooperate with parties that took part in the 2020 parliamentary election and that cooperated with Aleksandar Vučić. The Do not let Belgrade drown (NDB) movement and Social Democratic Party (SDS) declined to join the coalition. The representatives also stated that they would nominate a joint presidential candidate for the 2022 election. Deutsche Welle stated that the inter-coalition conflicts from the SzS continued to take place in UOPS. The coalition was also described as a "confederation of political parties", rather than a "federation". Narodna stated that political parties inside the coalition would be able to act "independently".

=== Activities and dissolution ===
As a reaction to the formation of UOPS, political parties that were excluded from participating in the coalition held a meeting in late September 2020. UOPS later criticised the government's approach towards the COVID-19 pandemic, and had stated that it would support the formation of a COVID-19 crisis team if it would include experts on the topic.

The coalition remained unstable and was challenged with conflicts, mainly inside Narodna. In December, SSP and DS had announced that they would form a joint platform for the upcoming inter-party dialogues on electoral conditions with the Movement of Free Citizens (PSG). Narodna had opposed this move since PSG had participated in the 2020 parliamentary election. During an interview, Zdravko Ponoš, who at the time served as vice-president of Narodna, stated that the activities of the coalition are "blocked", although he had also stated that opposition forces must cooperate more. During the Utisak nedelje talk show on 20 December, Ponoš stated that "the cooperation inside the coalition is far from good" and that the coalition had not been dissolved yet. Borko Stefanović, the deputy-president of SSP, had stated that the coalition should cooperate with parties that had been critical of Vučić. On 21 January 2021, Narodna confirmed that the coalition was dissolved. Shortly after its dissolution, parties around SSP and Narodna formed two separate blocs.

=== Aftermath ===
Later during 2021, the parties that were once a part of UOPS began cooperating again, and in November 2021, they formed the United Serbia coalition. Marinika Tepić was chosen as the representative of its ballot list for the parliamentary election, while in January 2022, Ponoš was chosen as the presidential candidate. The coalition was later renamed to United for the Victory of Serbia. In the presidential election, Ponoš placed second, winning 18% of the popular vote, while in the parliamentary elections, the coalition won 38 seats in total. Following the election, the coalition was dissolved due to conflicts between parties that had emerged again.

== Ideology and platform ==
During a press conference on 10 August 2020, the coalition representatives stated support to "continue the fight for a democratic society through non-violent means" and that it would also "fight for free and fair elections". Zoran Lutovac, president of the Democratic Party, had stated that the coalition would include options from the left to the right to "articulate the dissatisfaction that exists in Serbia". Like its predecessor, the coalition had wanted to end the rule of Aleksandar Vučić and his Serbian Progressive Party. Following the 2020 parliamentary election in Montenegro, the coalition had congratulated the opposition for its victory, and had hoped that they would form good relations with the newly-elected government. The coalition had also stated its support for the Serbian accession into the European Union.

== Members ==
There were 11 founding organisations of the United Opposition of Serbia, including Đorđe Vukadinović, a non-partisan individual.

Name	Leader	Main ideology	Political position	Ref.
Party of Freedom and Justice (SSP)	Dragan Đilas	Social democracy	Centre-left	
People's Party (Narodna)	Vuk Jeremić	Liberal conservatism	Centre-right	
Democratic Party (DS)	Zoran Lutovac	Social democracy	Centre-left	
Movement for Reversal (PZP)	Janko Veselinović	Social democracy	Centre-left	
United Trade Unions of Serbia "Sloga" (USS Sloga)	Željko Veselinović	Labourism	Left-wing	
Fatherland	Slaviša Ristić	Kosovo Serb minority politics		
Statehood Movement of Serbia (DPS)	Slobodan Samardžić	National conservatism	Right-wing	
Civic Platform (GP)	Jovan Jovanović	Liberalism	Centre	
Movement of Free Serbia (PSS)	Lidija Martinović	Social democracy	Centre-left	
Šumadija Region (ŠR)	Saša Milenić	Regionalism		
Democratic Fellowship of Vojvodina Hungarians (VMDK)	Áron Csonka	Hungarian minority interests		
