= Đorđo Đorđić =

Serbian politician and basketball coach

- Ђорђо Ђорђић
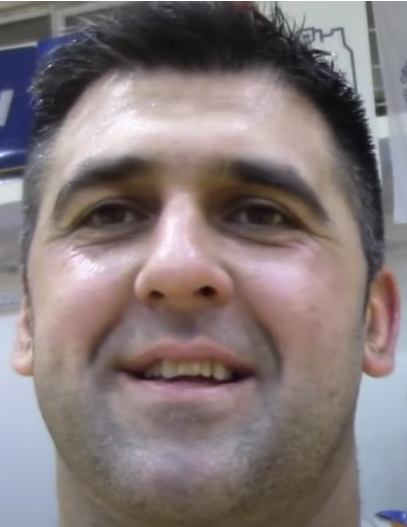
- Đorđić in 2017

Member of the National Assembly
- Incumbent
- Assumed office 1 August 2022

Personal details
- Born: 19 December 1978 (age 47) Sremska Mitrovica, SAP Vojvodina, SR Serbia, SFR Yugoslavia
- Party: RP (2026–present)
- Other political affiliations: SSP (until 2024)
- Occupation: Politician, businessman, basketball coach and player

Đorđo Đorđić (Serbian: Ђорђо Ђорђић; born 19 December 1978) is a Serbian politician, businessman, basketball coach and former player who has been a member of the National Assembly since 2022. First elected for the Party of Freedom and Justice (SSP), he left its parliamentary group in 2024 and co-founded the Workers' Party (RP) with Željko Veselinović. He was re-elected in 2026 on the Serbian Progressive Party-led "Aleksandar Vučić – United Serbia" list.

== Early life and career ==
Đorđić was born on 19 December 1978 in Sremska Mitrovica. He played basketball professionally and later became a coach. He is also a businessman.

== Political career ==
=== Party of Freedom and Justice ===
Đorđić started his political career in the centre-left Party of Freedom and Justice (SSP), led by Dragan Đilas, and was elected president of its Sremska Mitrovica branch. He was elected to the National Assembly in the 2022 parliamentary election, in which the SSP was part of the United for the Victory of Serbia (UZPS) coalition, and re-elected in the 2023 election, in which it was part of the Serbia Against Violence coalition.

In late October 2024, Đorđić and Željko Veselinović left the SSP parliamentary group, citing bad relations within the SSP and disagreements with its parliamentary leader Marinika Tepić. They announced that they would form a new parliamentary group and a new labour party. They were soon joined by SSP MPs Irena Živković and Sonja Pernat, and together they formed the "Movement Sloga – Experts Should Have A Say" parliamentary group.

=== Workers' Party ===
In April 2026, Đorđić accompanied Veselinović to consultations with President Aleksandar Vučić on snap elections, which most of the parliamentary opposition refused to attend. At the end of the month, he, Veselinović and Živković formed a new parliamentary group with an MP elected on the SNS list and the leader of the Russian Party. The Workers' Party was entered in the Register of Political Parties at the end of April 2026.

In September 2026, the Workers' Party announced that it would contest the snap parliamentary election on the SNS-led "Aleksandar Vučić – United Serbia" list, on which Đorđić was 66th. The list won 103 seats, losing the election to the Student List, and Đorđić was re-elected as the party's only MP. His mandate was confirmed at the constitutive sitting of the 15th National Assembly on 17 November 2026, and he joined the opposition "Aleksandar Vučić – Serbia Is Winning" parliamentary group.
