= Workers' Party (Serbia) =

Political party in Serbia

Workers' Party Радничка партија
- Abbreviation: RP
- President: Željko Veselinović
- Founder: Željko Veselinović
- Founded: 6 February 2026
- Registered: 27 April 2026
- Split from: Party of Freedom and Justice
- Headquarters: Nušićeva 6/3, Belgrade
- Ideology: Self-declared: Workers' rights; Euroscepticism
- National affiliation: United Serbia
- Colours: Red
- National Assembly: 1 / 250
- Assembly of Vojvodina: 2 / 120
- City Assembly of Belgrade: 0 / 110

Website
- radnickapartija.rs

The Workers' Party (Serbian: Радничка партија, romanized: Radnička partija, abbr. RP) is a political party in Serbia. It is led by Željko Veselinović, the president of the United Trade Unions of Serbia "Sloga", who was elected to the National Assembly in 2023 on the quota of the Party of Freedom and Justice. Founded in 2026, it declares itself to be in favour of expanding the rights of workers, pensioners, farmers, and students. It supports the accession of Serbia to the European Union, while declaring itself to be Eurosceptic. Initially denying any cooperation with the Serbian Progressive Party (SNS), it contested the 2026 parliamentary election on the SNS-led "Aleksandar Vučić – United Serbia" list, on which Đorđo Đorđić won a seat. It is also represented in the Assembly of Vojvodina.

== History ==
=== Background and formation ===
Željko Veselinović is the president of the United Trade Unions of Serbia "Sloga" who was elected to the National Assembly of Serbia on the quota of the Party of Freedom and Justice (SSP) in the 2023 Serbian parliamentary election. Together with Đorđo Đorđić, he left the SSP parliamentary group in October 2024. Veselinović and Đorđić announced the formation of the new Workers' Party (RP), with Veselinović stating that he believes that no political party in Serbia truly concentrates on workers' rights. They were followed by MPs Sonja Pernat and Irena Živković on 19 November. Together they formed a parliamentary group in the National Assembly. The RP began collecting signatures in December 2024. The opposition Serbia Centre political party alleged that the ruling Serbian Progressive Party (SNS) helped the RP collect signatures needed for the registration of the party in Leskovac. Veselinović denied this.

The RP was officially formed on 6 February 2026. In April, members of the Sloga parliamentary group took part in the consultations on early parliamentary elections held by the president of Serbia, Aleksandar Vučić. In response to this, Pernat and Slavica Radovanović left their parliamentary group. Veselinović went on to form a parliamentary group with the pro-government parties Russian Party and United Peasant Party soon after. Veselinović said that their cooperation was technical and practical. On 27 April, the RP was registered as a political party. Veselinović said that their path to registering the party was obstructed by both the government and the opposition.

=== Activities ===
The RP announced their participation in the parliamentary elections, as well as the creation of local boards and a broad coalition for the elections. It has denied participating in the coalition electoral list led by the SNS. Despite this, Branislava Pandurov, its member in the City Assembly of Novi Sad, joined the SNS-led group there, saying that the cooperation was only technical. The RP initially negotiated a joint run with Branimir Nestorović's We – Power of the People, but suspended the talks in July 2026, accusing the movement of trying to recruit its MPs. In September, the RP announced that it would take part in the 2026 parliamentary election on the SNS-led "Aleksandar Vučić – United Serbia" list. Đorđić was 66th on the list, which won 1,731,323 votes (39.48%) and 103 seats, losing the election to the Student List. Đorđić was re-elected; his mandate was confirmed on 17 November 2026, and he joined the "Aleksandar Vučić – Serbia Wins" parliamentary group in the 15th National Assembly.

== Ideology and platform ==
The RP declares itself to be in favour of expanding the rights of workers, pensioners, farmers, and students. They drafted a new Labour Law, which would bring a 35-hour workweek in Serbia. The RP declares itself to be Eurosceptic while still supporting the accession of Serbia to the European Union, partly due to its perceived respect for human and workers' rights. It opposes the recognition of Kosovo, while supporting retaining ties with Russia and especially China. Veselinović criticised neoliberalism and endorsed left-wing policies. While still in formation, the RP denied that it would cooperate with the SNS. Its MPs also announced that they would vote against the formation of the cabinet of Đuro Macut.

Vladimir Pejić of Faktor Plus and Đorđe Vukadinović of Nova srpska politička misao argued that there was a political space for a workers' rights party, though the newspaper Danas noted that the relatively minor Party of the Radical Left exists. The political scientist Zoran Stojiljković stated that the founders have to be cautious due to the failed experiment of the Labour Party of Serbia (LPS), noting that it received fewer votes in the 2003 Serbian parliamentary election than it collected for it to be registered as a political party. In an interview with Danas, Veselinović, however, said that the RP will not follow the failures of the LPS, which was the political arm of the Association of Free and Independent Trade Unions.

The RP has said that it would support SNS, or any other government, that introduced a new Labour Law.

== Organisation ==
The RP is led by Veselinović. Its headquarters are at Nušićeva 6/3 in Belgrade. In the 14th National Assembly, its MPs were Veselinović, Đorđić, and Živković. The RP is also represented in the Assembly of Vojvodina by Mileta Jurkić and Gabriela Visinger and in the City Assembly of Novi Sad by Pandurov. According to Veselinović, about €35,000 to €40,000 were spent on the registration of the party. The RP claims to have around 2,000 members.

=== List of presidents ===
#	President	Birth–Death	Term start	Term end
1	Željko Veselinović	1974–	6 February 2026	Incumbent

== Electoral performance ==
=== Parliamentary elections ===
National Assembly
Year	Leader	Popular vote	% of popular vote	#	# of seats	Seat change	Coalition	Status	Ref.
2026	Željko Veselinović	1,731,323	39.48%	2nd	1 / 250	New	AV–US	TBA	
