= Alliance for Serbia =

Former political coalition in Serbia

Alliance for Serbia Савез за Србију Savez za Srbiju
- Abbreviation: SZS
- Representatives: Dragan Đilas; Marinika Tepić; Borko Stefanović; Zoran Lutovac; Vuk Jeremić; Nebojša Zelenović; Boško Obradović
- Founded: 9 May 2018
- Dissolved: 10 August 2020
- Succeeded by: United Opposition of Serbia
- Political position: Big tent
- Colours: Blue; Red

Website
- savez-za-srbiju.rs

The Alliance for Serbia (Serbian Cyrillic: Савез за Србију, romanized: Savez za Srbiju, abbr. SZS) was an opposition alliance of political parties in Serbia that was founded in September 2018. The alliance boycotted the 2020 parliamentary election, due to claims that the elections would not be held under fair conditions. The alliance officially dissolved in August 2020, as the new alliance called United Opposition of Serbia was formed.

== History ==
Coalition was founded by Dragan Đilas in September 2018. The political background of alliance members is diverse, with both left-wing, liberal, moderate, right-wing and far-right factions voicing opposition to the government. It is composed of the Democratic Party, Dveri, People's Party, Party of Freedom and Justice, as well some minor and local anti-government parties and organisations. They have called for the institution of a technocratic transitional government which would serve for a period of 1 year after which elections would be held.

The Alliance have supported protests against Vučić and have signed Agreement with people along with other opposition parties on 6 February.

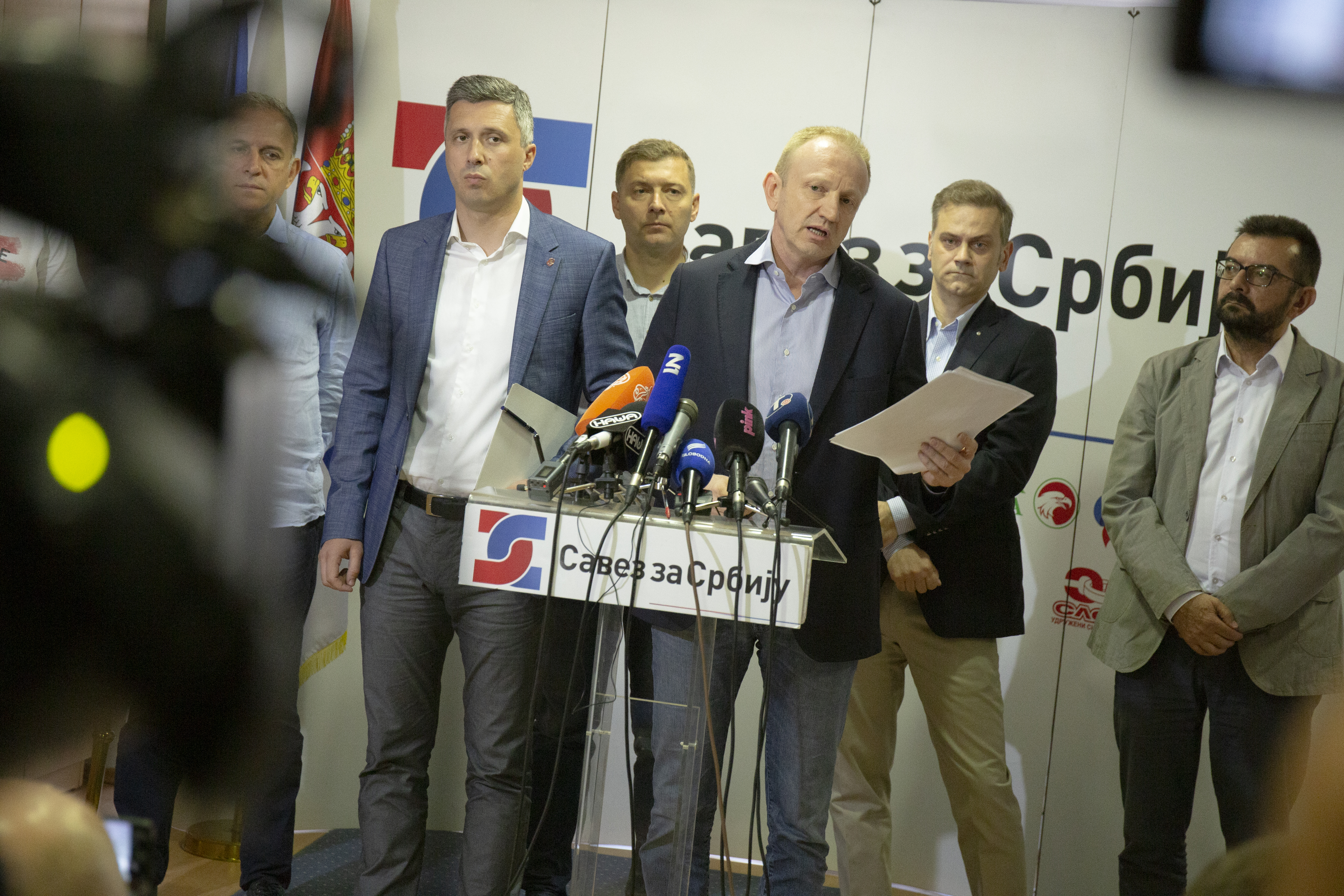
Leaders of SZS, from left to right: Zdravko Ponoš, Boško Obradović, Nebojša Zelenović, Dragan Đilas, Borko Stefanović and Janko Veselinović

The protests were precipitated by an assault on Borko Stefanović, one of the leaders of the Alliance. The non-partisan expert group, introduced during protests, concluded there were no conditions for free and fair elections in the country, due to the lack of public communication and inequality in that process, and they drafted a comprehensive and systematic document with six demands and six annexes. On September 16, 2019, the parties of the Alliance had taken a joint decision to boycott the coming parliamentary elections. In October, the first round of inter-party European Parliament-mediated dialogue took place, while the Alliance for Serbia refused to participate, stating that there is no time for their demands for fair election conditions to be met before April, when the election is scheduled.

== Members ==
| Name | Leader | Main ideology | Political position | MPs (2019) |
|---|---|---|---|---|
| Democratic Party; Демократска странка Demokratska stranka | Zoran Lutovac | Social liberalism Pro-Europeanism | Centre to centre-left | 12 / 250 |
| Dveri; Двери; Dveri | Boško Obradović | Serbian nationalism Social conservatism | Right wing to far-right | 4 / 250 |
| People's Party; Народна странка Narodna stranka | Vuk Jeremić | Liberal conservatism Pro-Europeanism | Centre-right | 3 / 250 |
| Party of Freedom and Justice; Странка слободе и правде Stranka slobode i pravde | Dragan Đilas | Social democracy Pro-Europeanism | Centre-left | 2 / 250 |
| Fatherland; Отаџбина; Otadžbina | Slaviša Ristić | National conservatism Christian democracy | Right-wing | 1 / 250 |
| Movement for Reversal; Покрет за преокрет Pokret za preokret | Janko Veselinović | Social democracy Social liberalism | Centre-left | — |
| United Trade Unions "Sloga"; Удружени синдикати Србије „Слога” Udruženi sindikati Srbije „Sloga” | Željko Veselinović | Syndicalism; Democratic socialism | Left-wing | — |

=== Parties that left coalition ===
| Name | Leader | Main ideology | Political position | MPs (2019) |
|---|---|---|---|---|
| Together for Serbia; Заједно за Србију; Zajedno za Srbiju | Nebojša Zelenović | Social democracy Green politics | Centre-left | 1 / 250 |
| Healthy Serbia; Здрава Србија; Zdrava Srbija | Milan Stamatović | National conservatism Euroscepticism | Right-wing | — |

== Electoral results ==
=== Parliamentary elections ===
| Year | Popular vote | % of popular vote | # of seats | Seat change | Status |
|---|---|---|---|---|---|
| 2018 | Coalition formed | | 23 / 250 | ▲23 | opposition |
| 2020 | Election boycott | | 0 / 250 | ▼23 | no seats |

== See also ==
- United Opposition of Serbia, the successor of this political alliance.
