= Ješić =

Ješić (Serbian Cyrillic: Јешић, pronounced [jěːʃitɕ]) is a Serbian surname. Notable people with the surname include:

- Aleksandar Ješić (born 1994), Serbian footballer
- Goran Ješić (born 1974), Vice President of the Democratic Party in Serbia
- Marko Jesic (born 1989), Australian footballer
- Miodrag Ješić (born 1958), Serbian football manager and former footballer
