= Party of Freedom and Justice =

Political party in Serbia

Party of Freedom and Justice Странка слободе и правде
- Abbreviation: SSP
- President: Dragan Đilas
- Secretary-General: Branko Miljuš
- Vice-Presidents: Marinika Tepić; Dušan Nikezić; Goran Petrović
- Parliamentary leader: Marinika Tepić
- Founded: 19 April 2019
- Merger of: Green Ecological Party – The Greens; Serbian Left
- Headquarters: Vojvode Stepe 199, Belgrade
- Youth wing: SSP Youth
- Women's wing: Women's Network
- Ideology: Social democracy; Pro-Europeanism
- Political position: Centre-left
- National affiliation: Platform for a European Serbia
- European affiliation: Party of European Socialists (associate)
- Parliamentary group: Party of Freedom and Justice
- Colours: Red
- National Assembly: 0 / 250
- Assembly of Vojvodina: 7 / 120
- City Assembly of Belgrade: 0 / 110

Website
- ssp.rs

The Party of Freedom and Justice (Serbian: Странка слободе и правде, romanised: Stranka slobode i pravde, abbr. SSP) is a social democratic political party in Serbia. It is led by Dragan Đilas, the former mayor of Belgrade.

Founded in 2019 as the merger of the Green Ecological Party – The Greens and Serbian Left, SSP was a member of the Alliance for Serbia (SZS), a coalition of opposition parties initiated by Đilas in 2018. Together with SZS, SSP boycotted the 2020 parliamentary election, claiming that it would not be free and fair. After the election, SSP became part of the United Opposition of Serbia (UOPS), the successor of SZS, which was dissolved in January 2021 due to disputes between SSP and the People's Party (Narodna). In late 2021, SSP and Narodna joined the Movement of Free Citizens and the Democratic Party to form the United for the Victory of Serbia (UZPS) alliance, formalised in February 2022, which won seats in the 2022 general election but dissolved shortly afterwards. In the 2023 election, SSP was part of the Serbia Against Violence alliance. In the 2026 election, it ran with Serbia Centre as "European Serbia" rather than withdrawing in favour of the Student List; the list won less than 1% of the vote and failed to enter the National Assembly, and deputy president Borko Stefanović left the party.

SSP is a centre-left party in opposition to the Serbian Progressive Party (SNS). A self-described anti-corruption party, it opposes party employment, and on the economy it has called for tax reforms introducing progressive taxation. SSP supports free textbooks and school meals for schoolchildren, and has called for a new labour law. The party supports the accession of Serbia to the European Union, the harmonisation of Serbia's foreign policy with that of the EU, and sanctions on Russia over the Russian invasion of Ukraine. SSP has criticised Chinese investments in infrastructure, and has adopted a platform pledging "reconciliation, cooperation, and the acceptance of diversity" among the countries of the Balkans. Its supporters are pro-European and see themselves as socially progressive. SSP is an associate member of the Party of European Socialists.

== History ==
=== Background and formation ===
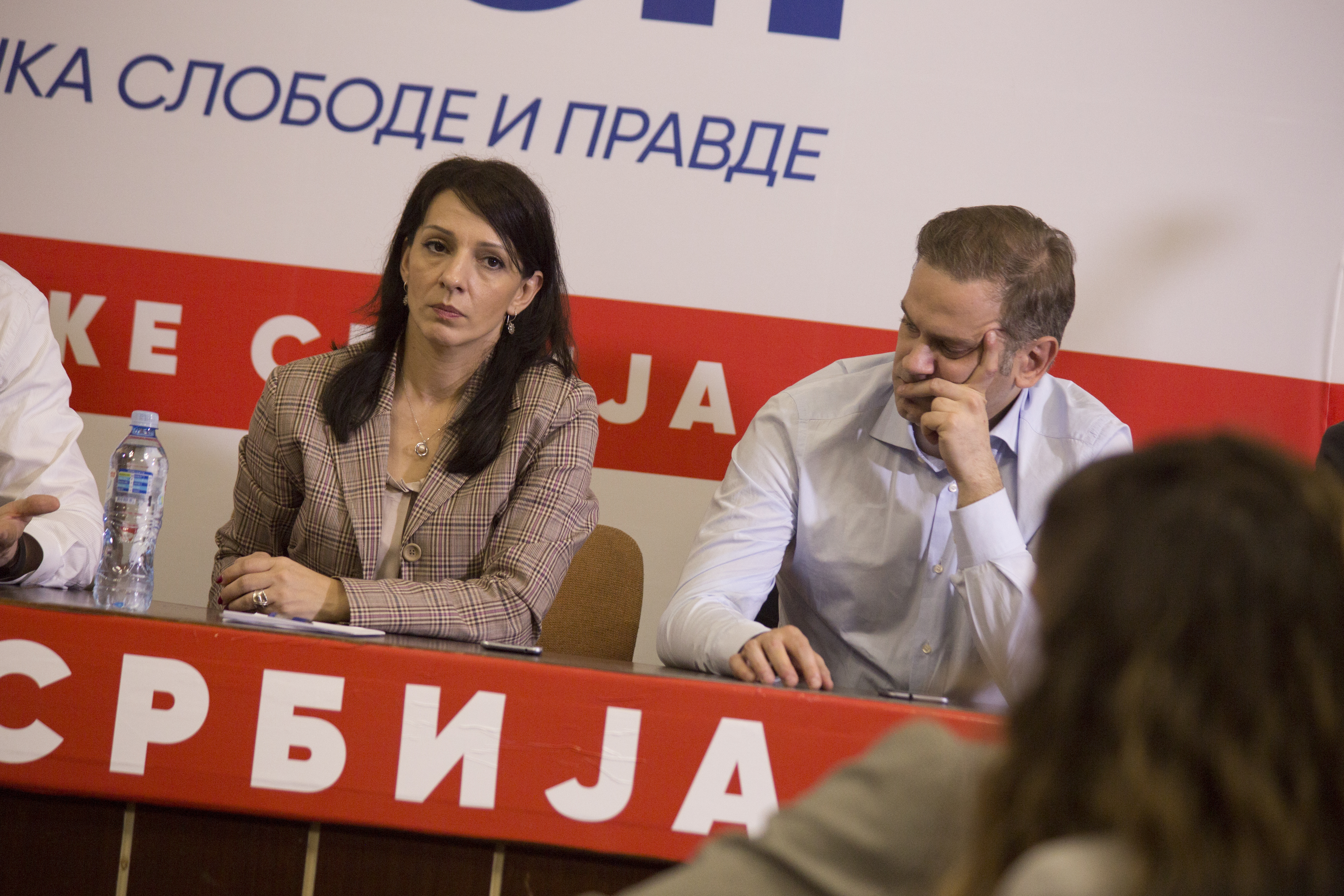
Marinika Tepić and Borko Stefanović at a party conference in May 2019

The Party of Freedom and Justice (SSP) was formed out of the Green Ecological Party – The Greens (ZEP–Zeleni), a political party established in 2008. Dejan Bulatović led ZEP–Zeleni from 2015. He led the party into a coalition with the Greens of Serbia (ZS), which fell apart before the 2017 presidential election, and into the Civic Bloc 381 coalition, formed in 2018 and headed by the Movement of Free Citizens (PSG). ZEP–Zeleni left the bloc in November 2018. A month later, it joined the Alliance for Serbia (SZS), an opposition alliance initiated by Dragan Đilas in 2018. A series of anti-government protests began in December 2018 after a physical attack on Borko Stefanović; SZS supported the protests.

In March 2019, it was announced that Đilas had agreed with Bulatović to reconstitute the party as SSP, with Đilas as its president; Đilas had previously stated that he had no plans to buy ZEP–Zeleni. Alongside ZEP–Zeleni, the Serbian Left (LS), led by Stefanović, and ten movements and individuals merged to create SSP. At the founding convention on 19 April 2019, Đilas was elected president, Stefanović deputy president, and Bulatović and Marinika Tepić vice-presidents. Following its formation, SSP had two seats in the National Assembly of Serbia and 13 seats in the City Assembly of Belgrade.

=== 2019–2021: Early years ===
In September 2019, SSP announced that it would boycott the 2020 parliamentary election, claiming that it would not be free and fair. SZS adopted this position later that month. The mass protests that began in 2018 formally ended in March 2020 due to the COVID-19 pandemic in Serbia. After the June 2020 parliamentary election, SZS was dissolved and transformed into the United Opposition of Serbia (UOPS), in which SSP also took part. However, UOPS remained unstable; in December 2020, SSP announced that it would form a joint platform with PSG for the inter-party dialogues on electoral conditions. This was opposed by the People's Party (Narodna), which ultimately led to the dissolution of UOPS in January 2021.

SSP presented its platform for the inter-party dialogues in February 2021. The dialogues lasted from July to October 2021, though SSP left them in September 2021, describing the proposed document as "unacceptable" (neprihvatljiv) and claiming that it offered no concrete solutions on electoral conditions. SSP then renewed its cooperation with Narodna, and the two announced that they would run together in the 2022 general election. In November 2021, it was announced that Tepić would head the joint list, mainly composed of SSP, Narodna, PSG and the Democratic Party (DS).

=== 2022–2024: Mainstream prominence ===
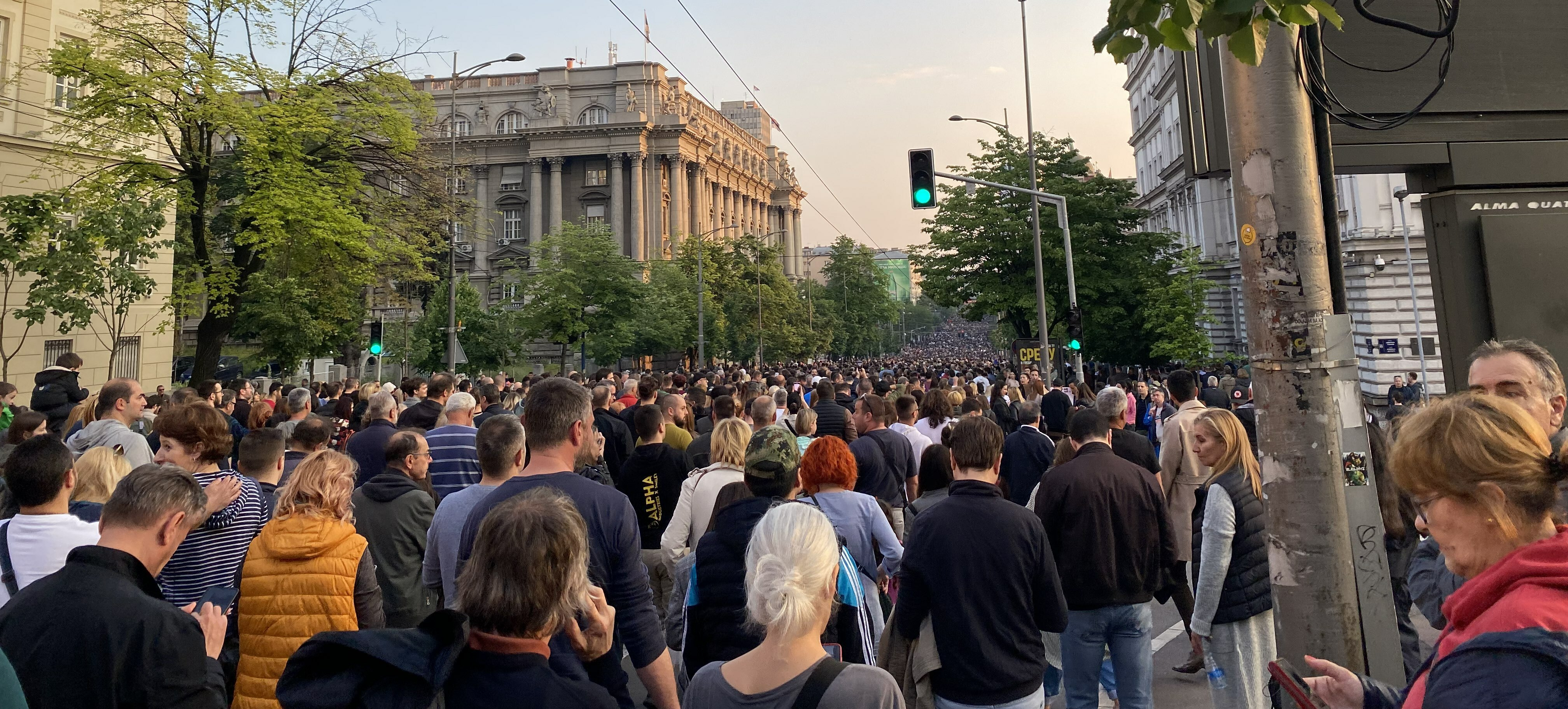
SSP took part in organising the 2023 Serbian protests

Shortly before the January 2022 constitutional referendum, SSP called on citizens not to take part in it. Later that month, SSP proposed Zdravko Ponoš of Narodna as the coalition's presidential candidate. The coalition was formalised in February 2022 under the name United for the Victory of Serbia (UZPS), with Ponoš confirmed as its presidential candidate. In the parliamentary election, UZPS won 14% of the vote and SSP won 10 seats in the National Assembly, while Ponoš won 18% of the vote, placing second behind Aleksandar Vučić, the incumbent president of Serbia. SSP also won six seats in the City Assembly of Belgrade in the 2022 Belgrade City Assembly election. After the elections, Đilas met Vučić to discuss the outcome of the Belgrade election, which drew criticism from Narodna, while DS said that Đilas had not consulted the other coalition members beforehand. This ultimately led to the dissolution of UZPS.

Following the elections, SSP announced that it would form joint groups with PSG, the Movement for Reversal and United Trade Unions of Serbia "Sloga" in the National Assembly and the City Assembly of Belgrade, under the name Ujedinjeni. Đilas was re-elected president of SSP in June 2022, while Stefanović, Tepić and Bulatović retained their positions, and Goran Petrović and Dušan Nikezić became vice-presidents. Stefanović was elected a vice-president of the National Assembly in August 2022. Bulatović left SSP and the Ujedinjeni parliamentary group in December 2022, alleging that Tepić was lobbying for the Serbian Progressive Party (SNS). He then met several government ministers before forming the Alliance of Social Democrats citizens' association in January 2023.

SSP took part in the 2023 mass protests, which began after the Belgrade school shooting and the mass shooting near Mladenovac and Smederevo in early May 2023. The Ujedinjeni parliamentary group changed its name to Forward to Europe in July 2023. In October 2023, SSP became part of the Serbia Against Violence (SPN) coalition, formed by the parties organising the 2023 protests, which contested the 2023 parliamentary, Vojvodina provincial and Belgrade City Assembly elections. Tepić and Miroslav Aleksić of the People's Movement of Serbia headed the SPN list. In the parliamentary election, SPN won 65 seats, 16 of which went to SSP. After the elections, SPN organised anti-government protests, which lasted until 30 December, during which Tepić and other SSP politicians went on hunger strike.

After the 14th National Assembly of Serbia was constituted, SSP formed a joint parliamentary group with PSG. The group was dissolved in April 2024, after which SSP formed its own parliamentary group. The City Assembly of Belgrade was not constituted, as the quorum was not met at its constitutive session, and a new election was called for 2 June. SSP opposed taking part in it on the grounds that electoral conditions had not improved, which ultimately led to the dissolution of SPN. The parties that decided to take part formed the We Choose Belgrade alliance.

=== 2024–present ===
In October 2024, Željko Veselinović and Đorđe Đorđić left the SSP parliamentary group, with Đorđić leaving SSP altogether. They were followed by Sonja Pernat and Irena Živković in November; Veselinović subsequently announced the formation of the Workers' Party.

Since November 2024, student-led anti-corruption protests have been held in Serbia. SSP has advocated the formation of a transitional government to end the crisis. In November 2025, it was announced that the Movement for Reversal would merge into SSP. In June 2026, SSP became part of the Platform for a European Serbia coalition.

==== 2026 parliamentary election ====
In the 2026 snap parliamentary election, SSP, Serbia Centre and the Solidarity movement ran as "European Serbia", with Tepić and Zdravko Ponoš as ballot carriers and Đilas first on the list, instead of withdrawing in favour of the Student List, as several other opposition parties had done. Several SSP officials refused to appear on the list: Peđa Mitrović and Mila Popović withdrew before it was submitted, while vice-presidents Borko Stefanović and Goran Petrović, as well as Jelena Milošević and Vladimir Vrsajkov, the heads of the party's boards in Niš and Novi Sad, withdrew their names and endorsed the Student List. On 24 September, Đilas, Ponoš, Tepić and Goran Ješić signed a declaration ruling out any post-election cooperation with SNS.

According to the Republic Electoral Commission's count of all polling stations, European Serbia won 12,570 votes (0.29%), failing to enter the National Assembly. On election night, Đilas congratulated the Student List on its "magnificent victory" and Serbia on its "victory over the regime of Aleksandar Vučić". He also said that "there are no people happier than us today", describing European Serbia's own result as "so ephemeral that we are not dealing with it". On 27 October, Stefanović announced that he had left SSP and resigned from all party positions, citing "harmful, catastrophic decisions by part of the party leadership" and criticising the lack of accountability for a result he called "truly devastating and miserable".

== Ideology and platform ==
=== Political leanings ===
At the founding convention in April 2019, Đilas stated that SSP would focus on economic prosperity and education, and that it would adopt a declaration of reconciliation regarding the Kosovo issue. The declaration was presented in May 2019, with SSP stating that it "predicts the way to solve the people's life problems [in Kosovo]" (predviđa put rešavanja životnih problema ljudi [na Kosovu]). SSP is in opposition to SNS. Describing itself as an anti-corruption party, SSP proposed a law on the "fight against corruption of public officeholders" (borbu protiv korupcije javnih funkcionera) in November 2019; Tepić said that the proposal was modelled on the practice of former Romanian anti-corruption prosecutor Laura Kövesi. SSP also opposes "party employment" (stranačko zapošljavanje), saying that "it should not matter whether you are a member of a political party, but whether you have the qualifications to do a certain job" (neće biti važno da li ste član stranke, već da li imate kvalifikaciju da radite određeni posao). In July 2022, SSP condemned attacks on investigative journalists.

Ideologically, SSP has been described as a social democratic party, positioned on the centre-left of the political spectrum. Dušan Spasojević, a professor at the Faculty of Political Sciences of the University of Belgrade, noted that within the party, Đilas is closer to the political centre, while Tepić is significantly more left-leaning; on social issues, he placed SSP on the centre-left. SSP supported holding EuroPride 2022 in Belgrade.

=== Economy ===
In June 2019, SSP criticised an increase in toll fees, claiming that road quality had not improved since the previous increase in 2017. In December 2019, SSP presented a proposed law on the origin of property, which according to Stefanović would confiscate property from those who could not prove that they had acquired it legally. In its 2020 programme, SSP pledged to "implement tax reforms that would introduce a progressive taxation of citizens' income and reduce taxes and contributions to 60% of net earnings" (sprovođenje poreske reforme kojom će se uvesti progresivno oporezivanje dohotka građan i smanjivanje poreza i doprinosa 60% neto zarade), and supported abolishing parafiscal taxes and introducing tax relief for donations and endowments in health, culture and sports.

SSP supports free textbooks and school meals for schoolchildren; in September 2022, it said that "with the reduction of corruption and abolishment of unnecessary projects, enough money would be collected to finance free schoolbooks and higher salaries for educators" (ukoliko bi se smanjila korupcije i ukinuli nepotrebni projekti, prikupilo dovoljno para za finansiranje besplatnih udženika i većih plata za prosvetne radnike). SSP has criticised workers' conditions in Serbia and has called for a new labour law that would "enable wages on which one can live with dignity" (omogućiti plate od kojih može da se dostojanstveno živi). Đilas has also said that he opposes neoliberalism, calling it "not just wrong, but life-threatening" (neoliberalna ideologija ne samo pogrešna, već i opasna po život).

Critical of duty-free trade with China, SSP has said that it "brings long-term consequences to the Serbian economy, jobs, and working standards".

=== Foreign policy ===
As a pro-European party, SSP supports the accession of Serbia to the European Union, stating that "Serbia's future is in Europe" (budućnost Srbije u Evropskoj uniji). It also wants Serbia to harmonise its foreign policy with that of the European Union, and has urged the government to continue Serbia's European integration. SSP adopted the "Serbia in the EU by 2030" declaration in March 2023, and a month later presented its "Forward to Europe" programme.

After the start of the 2022 Russian invasion of Ukraine, SSP called for an end to the war, supported the territorial integrity of Ukraine, and called for humanitarian aid for the affected population. SSP initially opposed sanctions on Russia, but reversed its position after the 2022 general election. Đilas later criticised political neutrality on the issue, saying that "neutrality is treated as siding with [Russia]" (politička neutralnost u ovom trenutku se tretira kao svrstavanje uz [Rusiju]), and that Serbia should remain militarily neutral but take a clear position on the war in Ukraine. In November 2022, SSP proposed a resolution to align Serbia's foreign policy with the European Union and impose sanctions on Russia.

=== Domestic and regional issues ===
SSP has criticised Chinese investments in Serbian infrastructure, claiming that "Serbia became the first Chinese colony in Europe" (Srbija prva kineska kolonija u Evropi). In April 2021, it called for the termination of the contract with the investor in Belgrade Waterfront. In May 2019, SSP called for an end to the "environmental massacre" (ekološki masakr) in Aleksinac, claiming that trees in the town centre had been cut down illegally. In July 2019, it criticised the Ministry of Environmental Protection over air quality in Bor, claiming that the government ignored excessive pollution with sulphur dioxide and heavy metal particles.

On regional cooperation, SSP has adopted a platform pledging reconciliation, cooperation and the acceptance of diversity among the countries of the Balkans. SSP has condemned the Srebrenica genocide, stating that "11 July should be dedicated to the Srebrenica victims" (11. jul treba da bude posvećen srebreničkim žrtvama), and calling for "a Balkans that functions on the principles of tolerance and cooperation" (Balkan koji funkcioniše na principima tolerancije i saradnje).

SSP has criticised the Serbian government's approach to Kosovo as well as the Kosovo government of Albin Kurti, and favours resolving the Kosovo issue through dialogue. In its declaration on Kosovo, SSP advocated reconciliation between Serbs and Albanians. Jelena Milošević, an SSP member of parliament, has described Kurti's government as authoritarian and accused it of violating the rights of Kosovo Serbs. During the 2022 North Kosovo crisis, SSP supported the resignation of Kosovo Serbs from Kosovo's institutions.

=== Demographic characteristics ===
According to a November 2020 study for the Heinrich Böll Foundation, SSP supporters saw themselves as socially progressive and economically left-leaning. The researchers also noted that voters with more liberal preferences leaned towards SSP. In 2022, Spasojević noted that its supporters' views were closer to those of Tepić than of Đilas, and that its voters were pro-European.

== Organisation ==
SSP is led by Dragan Đilas, who was most recently re-elected in 2022. Tepić, Nikezić and Petrović are its vice-presidents. Borko Stefanović served as deputy president from the party's founding until he left SSP in October 2026. Velibor Pavlović is the president of the party's executive board, and Peđa Mitrović its secretary-general. Its headquarters is at Vojvode Stepe 199 in Belgrade. SSP has a youth wing, SSP Youth, and a women's wing, the Women's Network.

=== International cooperation ===
In February 2019, Đilas met Zoran Zaev, the president of the Social Democratic Union of Macedonia, to discuss cooperation between the two parties. Representing SSP, Đilas took part in a meeting organised by the Party of European Socialists (PES) in May 2020, where he set out his party's position on the 2020 parliamentary election and the European Union. In November 2022, SSP established links with the Social Democratic Party of Austria, which supported SSP's admission to PES. Tepić represented SSP at the Global Progressive Forum organised by PES in December 2022. SSP became an observer member of PES in November 2023, and an associate member in October 2025. In April 2026, SSP representatives took part in the Global Progressive Mobilisation event hosted by PES.

In the Parliamentary Assembly of the Council of Europe, SSP is represented by Tatjana Pašić, who sits in the Socialists, Democrats and Greens Group. In the Congress of Local and Regional Authorities, SSP was previously represented by Marko Dimić, a substitute member who sat as a non-registered member.

=== List of presidents ===
#	President		Birth–Death	Term start	Term end
1	Dragan Đilas	An image of Dragan Đilas in 2019	1967–	19 April 2019	Incumbent

== Electoral performance ==
=== Parliamentary elections ===
National Assembly of Serbia
Year	Leader	Popular vote	% of popular vote	#	# of seats	Seat change	Coalition	Status	Ref.
2020	Dragan Đilas	Election boycott			0 / 250	▼2	SZS	Extra-parliamentary	
2022	Dragan Đilas	520,469	14.09%	▲2nd	10 / 250	▲10	UZPS	Opposition	
2023	Dragan Đilas	902,450	24.32%	2nd	15 / 250	▲5	SPN	Opposition	
2026	Dragan Đilas	12,570	0.29%	▼10th	0 / 250	▼15	ES	Extra-parliamentary	

=== Presidential elections ===
President of Serbia
Year	Candidate	1st round popular vote		% of popular vote	2nd round popular vote		% of popular vote	Notes	Ref.
2022	Zdravko Ponoš	2nd	698,538	18.84%	—N/a	—	—	Supported Ponoš	

=== Provincial elections ===
Assembly of Vojvodina
Year	Leader	Popular vote	% of popular vote	#	# of seats	Seat change	Coalition	Status	Ref.
2020	Dragan Đilas	Election boycott			0 / 120	0	SZS	Extra-parliamentary	
2023	Dragan Đilas	215,197	22.55%	▲2nd	9 / 120	▲9	SPN	Opposition	

=== Belgrade City Assembly elections ===
City Assembly of Belgrade
Year	Leader	Popular vote	% of popular vote	#	# of seats	Seat change	Coalition	Status	Ref.
2022	Dragan Đilas	195,335	21.78%	▲2nd	6 / 110	▼7	UZPS	Opposition	
2023	Dragan Đilas	325,429	35.39%	2nd	9 / 110	▲3	SPN	Snap election	
2024	Dragan Đilas	Election boycott			0 / 110	▼9	–	Extra-parliamentary	–
