= Goran Ješić =

Serbian politician (born 1974)

- Горан Јешић
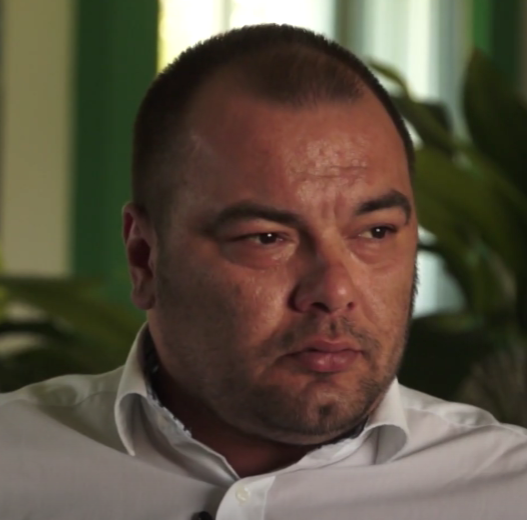
- Ješić in 2015

Member of the National Assembly
- In office 3 June 2016 – 3 June 2020

Vice President of the Government of Vojvodina
- In office 11 July 2012 – 2 July 2014

Provincial Secretary for Agriculture, Water Management and Forestry
- In office 11 July 2012 – 2 July 2014

Mayor of Inđija
- In office 2000–2012

Personal details
- Born: 3 August 1974 (age 52) Sremska Mitrovica, SAP Vojvodina, SR Serbia, SFR Yugoslavia
- Party: Solidarity (2024–present)
- Other political affiliations: GSS (1996–2006); DS (2006–2023)
- Education: University of Novi Sad

Goran Ješić (Serbian: Горан Јешић; born 3 August 1974) is a Serbian politician and the leader of the civic movement Solidarity. He was mayor of Inđija from 2000 to 2012, vice president of the Government of Vojvodina from 2012 to 2014, and a member of the National Assembly from 2016 to 2020. A former vice president of the Democratic Party (DS), he left the party in 2023. He was detained during the anti-corruption protests in November 2024, after which he returned to active politics and founded Solidarity. In the 2026 Serbian parliamentary election, Solidarity is part of the "European Serbia" coalition with the Party of Freedom and Justice and Serbia Centre.

== Early life and education ==
Ješić was born on 3 August 1974 in Sremska Mitrovica. He finished secondary school in Inđija and graduated from the Faculty of Agriculture of the University of Novi Sad. He later completed a specialist course in public policy at the Faculty of Political Sciences of the University of Belgrade.

== Political career ==
=== Civic Alliance of Serbia ===
Ješić began his political career in 1996, when he founded the Inđija branch of the liberal Civic Alliance of Serbia (GSS). He was one of the founders of Otpor, and in 2000 he became head of the GSS's Vojvodina branch. For the 2000 elections, he coordinated the Democratic Opposition of Serbia (DOS) coalition in Inđija, Pećinci, Stara Pazova and Irig.

In the 2000 local election, Ješić was elected to the Municipal Assembly of Inđija and shortly afterwards chosen as mayor. At 26, he was the youngest mayor in Serbia. He joined the GSS presidency in 2001, and was re-elected mayor in 2004. He was credited with the rapid economic development of Inđija during his tenure. In the summer of 2006, Ješić left the GSS, accusing its president Nataša Mićić of "merging" the party into the Liberal Democratic Party (LDP).

=== Democratic Party ===
On 31 October 2006, Ješić announced that he was joining the Democratic Party, calling it the "only serious democratic party that can continue reforms in Serbia". He also said that he had voted against the new constitution in the 2006 Serbian constitutional referendum. He was re-elected mayor in 2008.

In July 2012, Bojan Pajtić appointed Ješić vice president of the Government of Vojvodina and Provincial Secretary for Agriculture, Water Management and Forestry. He resigned from both posts in June 2014, following Pajtić's election as DS president.

Within the DS, Ješić headed the party's committee for agriculture, water management and forestry, as well as its Srem regional board, and was a vice president of the party from 2014 to 2016. He was elected to the National Assembly in the 2016 parliamentary election and served until 2020. He was among the DS members who opposed the party's decision to boycott the 2020 Serbian parliamentary election, later calling the boycott "a big mistake". He left the DS in 2023.

=== 2024 detention ===
On 5 November 2024, during a protest in Novi Sad following the Novi Sad railway station canopy collapse, Ješić was detained by police after trying to prevent the arrest of a young protester. He was released on 7 November, but turned himself in the next day after it was announced that he would be detained again. Lawyer Sead Spahović described him as a political prisoner. He was released again on 22 November. After his release, Ješić announced his return to active politics, calling it "the beginning of the end of the Vučić regime". On 27 November, in an interview with Vreme, he announced plans to form a new political organisation based in Novi Sad.

=== Solidarity ===
On 21 December 2024, Ješić presented the political initiative "Solidarity, Self-Defence, Liberation" (Solidarnost, samoodbrana, oslobođenje) at a public forum in Novi Sad attended by representatives of the opposition. The initiative was formally established as the Solidarity civic movement in February 2025.

Ahead of the 2026 Serbian parliamentary election, Solidarity formed the "European Serbia" coalition with the Party of Freedom and Justice (SSP) and Serbia Centre (SRCE), announced on 9 September 2026, with Marinika Tepić and Zdravko Ponoš as the list's leading figures. Ješić said the movement had achieved its political goal of ensuring that a pro-European list would run in the election. He said the coalition was open to cooperating with the Student List in election monitoring and in the post-election period, and argued that the two should not be enemies. Ješić was placed 186th on the list, while Solidarity's international secretary, former minister Jasna Matić, was among the first ten candidates.

During the campaign, Ješić said he regarded Solidarity as a partner of the student movement and hoped for a Student List victory, adding that the pro-European opposition would back the presidential candidate of the largest opposition list without conditions. On 24 September 2026, the anniversary of the 24 September 2000 elections that defeated Slobodan Milošević, Ješić, Dragan Đilas, Tepić and Ponoš signed a "Declaration for a European Serbia", pledging that the coalition would not cooperate with the Serbian Progressive Party after the election.

== Political positions ==
Ješić describes himself as left-wing. He opposes the rule of the Serbian Progressive Party, which he has called a "mafia pyramid".

=== Foreign policy ===
Ješić supports Serbia's accession to the European Union and the imposition of sanctions on Russia over its invasion of Ukraine.

=== Kosovo ===
Ješić has argued that the current status of Kosovo is the result of "absolutely wrong" Serbian policy over several decades, which in his view culminated in ethnic cleansing, war, military defeat and capitulation under the Kumanovo Agreement. He has called the proposed Community of Serb Municipalities a "quasi-institution", arguing that the rights of Kosovo Serbs are best protected through the OSCE and the Council of Europe.

== Personal life ==
Ješić lives in Novi Sad. His brother, Vladimir Ješić, is a journalist.
