= Željko Veselinović =

Serbian union leader and politician

- Жељко Веселиновић
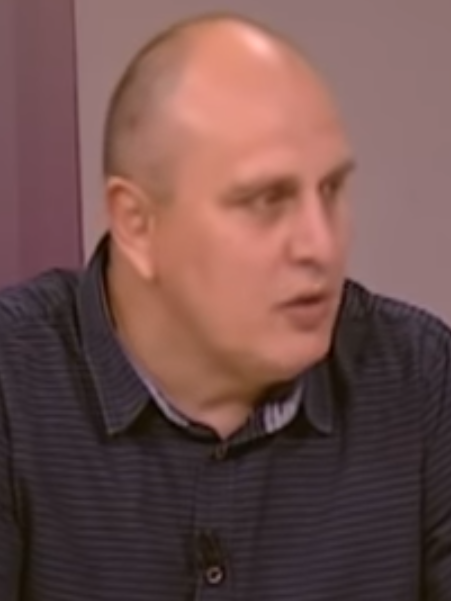
- Veselinović in 2019

Member of the National Assembly
- In office 6 February 2024 – 17 November 2026

President of United Trade Unions of Serbia "Sloga"
- Incumbent
- Assumed office 2008

Personal details
- Born: 1974 (age 51–52) Smederevo, SR Serbia, SFR Yugoslavia
- Party: Workers' Party (2026–present)
- Occupation: Trade unionist, politician

Željko Veselinović (Serbian: Жељко Веселиновић; born 1974) is a Serbian trade union leader and politician who is the president of the United Trade Unions of Serbia "Sloga" and of the Workers' Party. He was one of the founders of the Alliance for Serbia, which was transformed into the United Opposition of Serbia in 2020. Elected to the National Assembly in 2023 on the Serbia Against Violence list, he later broke with the opposition, and his party contested the 2026 parliamentary election on the Serbian Progressive Party-led "Aleksandar Vučić – United Serbia" list. He was not a candidate himself, and his term ended in November 2026.

== Early life and career ==
Veselinović was born in 1974 in Smederevo. He has a degree in economics.

He began working as a trade unionist at the end of 2000 at the then Sartid steelworks in Smederevo. In 2003, he was elected the youngest union president in the history of the factory. Five years later, he founded "Sloga" and became its second president.

He served as adviser on labour relations and socio-economic issues to Bojan Pajtić, then president of the Government of AP Vojvodina. According to his official biography, he is "one of the few people who in his career went through all instances from the shift commissioner in the factory to the president of the national union". He has led and organised several strikes and protests, and is a member of the network of trade unionists of the European Left and the European Social Forum. It was speculated that he would run in the 2017 presidential election, but he endorsed Vuk Jeremić instead.

== Political career ==
=== Opposition ===
In 2018, the opposition Alliance for Serbia was formed with "Sloga" as one of its founding members, and Veselinović became its first chairman. He served as a member of the City Assembly of Belgrade. The alliance was dissolved in August 2020 and transformed into the United Opposition of Serbia. In an interview with Danas, he said that unions should be more involved in politics.

In the 2023 Serbian parliamentary election, Veselinović was elected to the National Assembly on the Serbia Against Violence list and joined the parliamentary group of the Party of Freedom and Justice (SSP). In October 2024, he and fellow MP Đorđo Đorđić left the SSP parliamentary group. Veselinović described the move as one of the most difficult decisions of his life, said that he had personally informed SSP president Dragan Đilas of his intention in June, and announced that the two would continue the opposition struggle as independent MPs.

=== Workers' Party ===
Amid the student-led anti-corruption protests and opposition demands for snap parliamentary elections, Veselinović attended consultations with President Aleksandar Vučić on 9 April 2026 as the head of "Sloga" and as an MP, accompanied by Đorđić, while most of the parliamentary opposition refused to attend. After the meeting, MPs Sonja Pernat and Slavica Radovanović left his "Pokret radnika Sloga – Struka" parliamentary group in protest. Veselinović later called Vučić a "grandmaster for this opposition". At the end of April, he formed a new parliamentary group with Đorđić, Irena Živković, an MP elected on the SNS list, and the leader of the Russian Party.

On 30 April 2026, Veselinović's Workers' Party (Radnička partija, RP), headquartered in Nušićeva Street in Belgrade, was entered in the Register of Political Parties, as published in the Official Gazette of the Republic of Serbia. In May 2026, Vladimir Gajić, president of the People's Party, said he was close to an agreement with Branimir Nestorović's We – Power of the People on a joint list, and media reported that the Workers' Party was expected to join it. In July, the RP suspended the talks, accusing Nestorović's movement of trying to recruit its MPs, and in September it announced that it would contest the 2026 snap parliamentary election on the SNS-led "Aleksandar Vučić – United Serbia" list.

Veselinović was not among the candidates on the list, on which Đorđić won the party's only seat. His term as an MP ended when the 15th National Assembly was constituted on 17 November 2026.

== Personal life ==
He speaks English. He is married and has two sons.
