= Očigrije =

Očigrije Очигрије
- Village
- Location within Bosnia and Herzegovina
- Coordinates: 44°27′43″N 16°08′34″E
- Country: Bosnia and Herzegovina
- Entity: Federation of Bosnia and Herzegovina
- Canton: Una-Sana
- Municipality: Bihać

Area
  - Total: 3.82 sq mi (9.89 km^{2})

Population (2013)
  - Total: 2
  - Density: 0.52/sq mi (0.20/km^{2})
- Time zone: UTC+1 (CET)
  - Summer (DST): UTC+2 (CEST)

Očigrije (Serbian Cyrillic: Очигрије) is a village in the municipality of Bihac, Bosnia and Herzegovina.

== Demographics ==
According to the 2013 census, its population was 2, all Serbs.
