= Bulgarian train =

Vote-rigging method

Bulgarian train (Bosnian, Macedonian, Montenegrin and Serbian: бугарски воз, romanized: bugarski voz; Croatian: bugarski vlak), in Bulgaria known as Indian string (Bulgarian: индианска нишка, romanized: indianska niška), is a method of vote-rigging with the goal of influencing the election process through the control of ballots. The term was coined by the media in Bosnia and Herzegovina ahead of the country's general election in October 2010, and has since been used to refer to similar techniques used during elections in some of the ex-Yugoslav republics. The name of the method originates from its widespread use during the European Parliament election held in Bulgaria in June 2009, at which analysts' estimates indicate that 200,000-350,000 votes were sold or coerced.

== Description ==
Bulgarian train is a method of vote-buying that includes a recurrent process of casting pre-filled ballots while simultaneously removing empty ballots from the polling stations. The process starts when political 'handlers' ('the locomotive') distribute pre-filled ballots in front of polling stations. The voters who are willing to sell their ballots take them secretly into the polling stations. Inside of the polling stations, the voters are given empty ballots in accordance with law, but instead of legally voting by filling out the legally obtained ballots and then casting them, they cast the illegally obtained pre-filled ballots that they secretly carried into the polling stations, thus keeping possession of the legally obtained empty ballots even after having voted. Then, they go back outside and hand the empty ballots to the handlers, who fill them in and give over to the next voters. Thus the ballots have been illegally transferred from one person to another in a process that resembles having all the passengers in a train be moved from the wagon they originally occupied to the next one, one "wagon" at a time.

== Use ==
=== Bulgaria ===
The method was massively used in Bulgaria during the European Parliament election in June and the parliamentary election in July 2009. The voters willing to sell their vote were primarily from the Roma community. Analysts estimate that the number of people who sold or coerced their vote in this way ranges from 200,000 to 350,000 at each election. Consequently, the name of the method has become eponymous with Bulgaria.

=== North Macedonia ===
The implementation of the method was reportedly prevented in Struga during the Macedonian parliamentary election in December 2016.

=== Serbia ===
Bulgarian train was reported during the 2016 and 2020 parliamentary election, during the 2022 presidential and parliamentary election and during 2023 parliamentary and local election.

=== Bosnia and Herzegovina ===
Bulgarian train was reported in Teslić during the Bosnian general election in October 2014, when the voting process was interrupted until the suspicious person was cleared from the polling station.

=== Hungary ===
A variation of the Bulgarian train was reported in Hungary used by Fidesz primarily buying votes from the Roma community in the 2014 and 2018 elections.

== Controversies ==
The use of the term "Bulgarian train" sparked controversies in Bulgaria, where it is considered offensive and the same technique of vote-rigging is known as "Indian string"; the adjective "Indian" in this term refers to Indigenous peoples of the Americas, as opposed to a term reflecting the country of India, which would be индийска in Bulgarian). In a research paper on the vote-rigging in Bulgarian elections published in 2010, Bulgarian political scientist Georgi Manolov avoids the use of names associated with specific countries or ethnicities. He refers to the fraudulent techniques as 'vote trading' and the recurrent process of vote-rigging simply as 'train'.

== See also ==
- Carousel voting
