= Đorđe Vukadinović =

Serbian philosopher and political analyst

- Ђорђе Вукадиновић
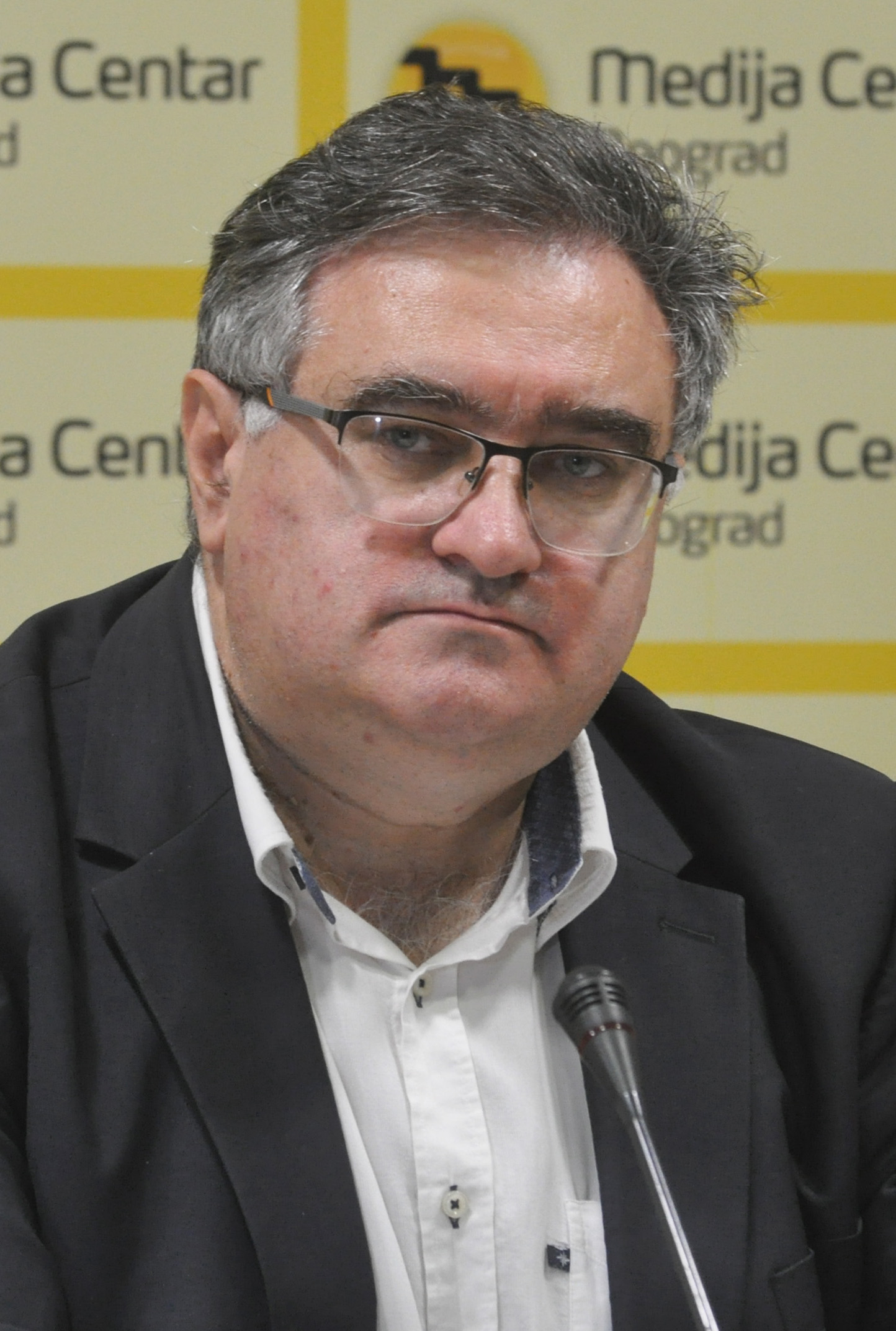
- Vukadinović in 2019

Member of the National Assembly of the Republic of Serbia
- In office 3 June 2016 – 3 August 2020

Personal details
- Born: 23 October 1962 (age 63) Sombor, PR Serbia, FPR Yugoslavia
- Party: Independent
- Education: University of Belgrade
- Occupation: Political analyst, journalist, professor

Đorđe Vukadinović (Serbian Cyrillic: Ђорђе Вукадиновић; born 23 October 1962) is a Serbian philosopher, political analyst, and journalist.

== Biography ==
Vukadinović was born in Sombor on 23 October 1962. He graduated from the University of Belgrade Faculty of Philosophy in 1987. After that, he was a teacher of philosophy at the Gymnasium of Karlovci for some time. Since 1990, he lectures at the University of Belgrade Faculty of Philosophy on the courses "Introduction to the social theory" and "philosophy of politics". He wrote several dozen scientific papers on the topics of classical and modern German philosophy, philosophy of history and philosophy of politics. He wrote columns for many newspapers and journals including Politika and NIN.

Vukadinović has three published books: Između dve vatre (2007), Od nemila do nedraga (2008) and Pompeja na Balkanu (2012).

He is the founder and editor-in-chief of the conservative political magazine Nova srpska politička misao.

Vukadinović was an MP in Assembly of Serbia from 2016 to 2020. He was elected in the 2016 election as part of the Democratic Party of Serbia/Dveri list, but left the group in late 2016 to join the newly formed Za spas Srbije parliamentary group. Since 2020, he is an independent member of United Opposition of Serbia.

Vukadinović publicly espouses conservative, eurosceptic and pro-Russian views. On 21 May 2022, National Security and Defense Council of Ukraine accused Vukadinović of spreading Russian propaganda. He endorsed People's Party in 2023 Serbian parliamentary election.

== Works ==
- Između dve vatre, 2007
- Od nemila do nedraga, 2008
- Pompeja na Balkanu, 2012
