= Borko Stefanović =

Serbian politician (born 1974)

- Борко Стефановић
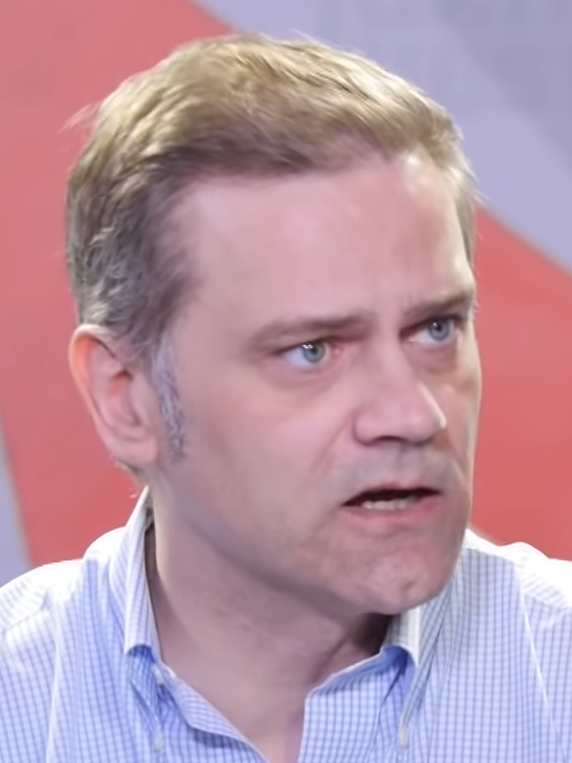
- Stefanović in 2019

Vice-President of the National Assembly
- In office 2 August 2022 – 6 February 2024
- President: Vladimir Orlić

Personal details
- Born: Borislav Stefanović; 5 February 1974 (age 52) Novi Sad, SAP Vojvodina, SR Serbia, SFR Yugoslavia
- Party: Independent (since 2026)
- Other political affiliations: GSS (1999–2001); DS (2003–2015); LS (2015–2019); SSP (2019–2026)
- Education: University of Novi Sad
- Occupation: Lawyer

Borko Stefanović (Serbian: Борко Стефановић; born Borislav Stefanović on 5 February 1974) is a Serbian politician. A former member of the Democratic Party (DS), he served as political director of the Ministry of Foreign Affairs and as Serbia's representative in the Belgrade–Pristina negotiations from 2010. After leaving DS in 2015, he founded the Serbian Left (LS), which merged into the Party of Freedom and Justice (SSP) in 2019. He was the deputy president of SSP from its founding and a vice-president of the National Assembly from 2022 to 2024. He left SSP in October 2026, after withdrawing from its electoral list for the 2026 Serbian parliamentary election and endorsing the Student List.

== Early life and education ==
Stefanović was born on 5 February 1974 in Novi Sad. He finished secondary school in Sremski Karlovci and graduated from the University of Novi Sad Faculty of Law in 1999. He legally changed his first name from Borislav to Borko in 2016. He played bass guitar in the punk rock band Generacija bez budućnosti ("Generation without a Future"), which last performed in 2011.

== Political career ==
=== Early career ===
Stefanović became politically active in 1999, when he joined the anti-nationalist Civic Alliance of Serbia (GSS). He left the party in 2001, after which he had no party affiliation for two years.

=== Democratic Party (2003–2015) ===
After the assassination of Zoran Đinđić in 2003, Stefanović joined the Democratic Party, describing his decision as "my personal response to an uncivilised act".

In 2008, Stefanović was the chief negotiator in the sale of Naftna Industrija Srbije (NIS) to Gazprom Neft. The sale was concluded without a public tender, and its terms were criticised in the Serbian media, as NIS was sold for around a fifth of its estimated market value. One of the key conditions of the deal was that the South Stream pipeline would run through Serbia. The project was cancelled after the Russian annexation of Crimea, and in 2014 the Serbian government launched an investigation into the privatisation of NIS.

In December 2010, President Boris Tadić appointed Stefanović as Serbia's representative in the Belgrade–Pristina negotiations. He was also political director of the Ministry of Foreign Affairs and chief of staff to Foreign Minister Vuk Jeremić. In July 2011, Blic reported that Jeremić had tried to remove Stefanović from the negotiating team and to exclude the ministry from the talks, allegedly saying that the ministry and the negotiations "have contradicting goals"; according to Blic's sources, Tadić did not approve the change. Stefanović had been the best man at Jeremić's wedding. In September 2011, Jeremić replaced him as chief of staff with Danko Prokić, Serbia's former ambassador to Slovakia.

In January 2015, Stefanović, then a vice-president of DS, presented a manifesto calling for a "Confederation of the Western Balkans" and a five-year freeze on the foreign debts of its member states. He opposed austerity, particularly cuts to pensions and salaries, and said that he was "not for any nationalisation" and supported European integration, but viewed parts of the programme of the Greek Syriza sympathetically. He left DS on 10 December 2015, citing as the "last straw" the party's nomination in a local election in Čukarica of Bojan Dimitrijević, who had sought the rehabilitation of Milan Nedić.

=== Serbian Left (2015–2019) ===
Later in December 2015, Stefanović founded the Serbian Left (LS). He initially worked with sociologist Jovo Bakić, who wrote most of the party's original ideological profile, but Bakić soon left the project over disagreements on strategy. Political scientist Vladimir Unkovski-Korica wrote that Stefanović wanted a party "more like the Democratic Party in the United States" than one of Europe's left-wing parties. In its first election, the 2016 parliamentary election, the party won 0.95% of the vote.

On 23 November 2018, Stefanović was physically assaulted while addressing an audience in Kruševac. He blamed President Aleksandar Vučić for creating a "gruesome atmosphere" for opposition politicians. The attack sparked the anti-government protests that began in December 2018.

=== Party of Freedom and Justice (2019–2026) ===
In April 2019, the Serbian Left merged with the Green Ecological Party – The Greens and several movements to form the Party of Freedom and Justice (SSP), led by Dragan Đilas. At the founding convention on 19 April 2019, Stefanović was elected deputy president. He retained the post when Đilas was re-elected in June 2022. After the 2022 general election, he was elected a vice-president of the National Assembly on 2 August 2022, serving until the next convocation was constituted on 6 February 2024.

Ahead of the 2026 snap parliamentary election, SSP ran with Serbia Centre and the Solidarity movement as "European Serbia", instead of withdrawing in favour of the Student List. On 19 September 2026, Stefanović, fellow vice-president Goran Petrović, and the heads of the party's boards in Niš and Novi Sad, Jelena Milošević and Vladimir Vrsajkov, withdrew their names from the list and endorsed the Student List. European Serbia won 0.28% of the vote and failed to enter the National Assembly.

On 27 October 2026, Stefanović announced that he had left SSP and resigned from all party positions. He cited "harmful, catastrophic decisions by part of the party leadership", which he said had "exposed proven people to risk and shame", and criticised the lack of accountability for what he called a "truly devastating and miserable" result. He described the Student List as the "undisputed winner" of the election, and called for a "common front of struggle" focused on reforming institutions and fighting corruption and organised crime.
