= United Trade Unions of Serbia "Sloga" =

Trade union in Serbia

United Trade Unions of Serbia "Sloga" Удружени синдикати Србије "Слога"
- Abbreviation: USS Sloga
- President: Željko Veselinović
- Founder: Željko Veselinović
- Founded: 2008
- Headquarters: Nušićeva 6, Belgrade
- Ideology: Labourism; Syndicalism; Anti-neoliberalism
- Political position: Left-wing
- International affiliation: World Federation of Trade Unions
- Colours: Red
- National Assembly: 0 / 250
- City Assembly of Belgrade: 1 / 110

Website
- sloga.org.rs

The United Trade Unions of Serbia "Sloga" (Serbian: Удружени синдикати Србије "Слога", romanised: Udruženi sindikati Srbije "Sloga", abbr. USS Sloga) is a trade union and a left-wing political organisation in Serbia. It was founded in 2008 and has been headed by Željko Veselinović since its foundation. In 2026, Veselinović registered a new political party, the Workers' Party, and Sloga did not take part in the 2026 Serbian parliamentary election.

== History ==
United Trade Unions of Serbia "Sloga" was formed in 2008 by Željko Veselinović. It had regularly organised International Workers' Day walks. USS Sloga later organised media campaigns regarding workers' conditions, and had also criticised the economic model that has been pursued by Aleksandar Vučić. It participated as a political organisation in the 2014 parliamentary election as part of the Democratic Party (DS) coalition list. Veselinović became a member of the National Assembly afterwards.

According to USS Sloga, they had 100,000 members in 2017. Its members were threatened by the president of the Municipality of Ub Darko Glišić in 2018. USS Sloga regained its seat in the National Assembly following the 2022 general election. Veselinović was re-elected on the Serbia Against Violence list in the 2023 election, having previously been a member of the Party of Freedom and Justice (SSP). In October 2024, he and Đorđe Đorđić left the SSP parliamentary group; MPs Sonja Pernat and Irena Živković later joined them.

On 9 April 2026, Veselinović and Đorđić took part in the consultations on early elections and foreign policy convened by President Aleksandar Vučić, which most of the parliamentary opposition did not attend; Pernat and Slavica Radovanović left the group, "Workers' Movement Sloga – Profession", the same day in protest. The Workers' Party (Radnička partija), based at the union's Nušićeva street address in Belgrade, was entered in the register of political parties at the end of April 2026, with Veselinović at its helm. Neither Sloga nor the Workers' Party contested the 2026 Serbian parliamentary election. The election, held on 25 October 2026, was won by the Student List with 140 of the 250 seats.

== Ideology ==
It has been described as a left-wing trade union. USS Sloga defines itself as "an independent democratic trade union organisation of employees that they join for the purpose of representation and protection of their professional, labor, economic, social, cultural and other individual and collective interests". Veselinović is a member of Trade Union Network of the Party of the European Left and European Social Forum. USS Sloga is a member of the World Federation of Trade Unions. USS Sloga opposes neoliberalism. It supports changing the Labor Law.

USS Sloga had also criticised the approach of other trade unions in Serbia. In 2017, they had argued that increasing the minimal wage for 15% would not be enough to cover the costs of a minimum consumer basket. In August 2022, they had proposed an increase in the minimum wage, wages, and pensions.

The trade union was a part of several opposition coalitions, including the Alliance for Serbia, United Opposition of Serbia, United for the Victory of Serbia, and Serbia Against Violence.

== Electoral performance ==
=== Parliamentary elections ===
National Assembly of Serbia
Year	Leader	Popular vote	% of popular vote	#	# of seats	Seat change	Coalition	Status
2014	Željko Veselinović	216,634	6.23%	▲3rd	1 / 250	▲1	USS Sloga–DS–Nova–DSHV–BS	Opposition
2016	Željko Veselinović	Did not participate			0 / 250	▼1	–	Extra-parliamentary
2020	Željko Veselinović	Election boycott			0 / 250	0	SzS	Extra-parliamentary
2022	Željko Veselinović	520,469	14.09%	▲2nd	1 / 250	▲1	UZPS	Opposition
2023	Željko Veselinović	902,450	24.32%	2nd	1 / 250	0	SPN	Opposition
2026	Željko Veselinović	Did not participate			0 / 250	▼1	–	Extra-parliamentary
