= Jelena Milošević =

Serbian politician (born 1988)

- Јелена Милошевић
- Milošević in 2023

Member of the National Assembly of the Republic of Serbia
- Incumbent
- Assumed office 1 August 2022

Member of the Parliamentary Assembly of the Council of Europe
- Incumbent
- Assumed office 10 October 2022

Personal details
- Born: 1988 Niš, Yugoslavia
- Party: SSP

Jelena Milošević (Serbian Cyrillic: Јелена Милошевић; born 1988) is a Serbian politician. She has served in the Serbian parliament since 2022 as a member of the Party of Freedom and Justice (SSP).

== Early life ==
Milošević was born in Niš, in what was then the Socialist Republic of Serbia in the Socialist Federal Republic of Yugoslavia. She lives in the city and is an entrepreneur in private life.

== Career ==
Milošević is a member of the SSP presidency and the leader of the party's city committee for Niš. The party contested the 2022 Serbian parliamentary election as part of the United for the Victory of Serbia (UZPS) coalition. Milošević appeared in the fourteenth position on the coalition's electoral list and was elected when the list won thirty-eight mandates. The Serbian Progressive Party (SNS) and its allies won the election, and the SSP representatives served afterward in opposition. During her first term, Milošević was a member of the judiciary committee (Note: Formally known as the Committee on the Judiciary, Public Administration, and Local Self-Government.) and the committee on the diaspora and Serbs in the region, a deputy member of the culture and information committee, and the leader of Serbia's parliamentary friendship group with Australia.

For the 2023 Serbian parliamentary election, the SSP joined a broader opposition coalition known as Serbia Against Violence (SPN). Milošević received the twenty-second position on its list and was elected to a second parliamentary term when the list won 65 seats. The SNS and its allies again won the election, and the SSP members remain in opposition. Milošević is once again a member of the committee on the diaspora and Serbs in the region as well as the administrative committee (Note: Formally known as the Committee on Administrative, Budgetary, Mandate, and Immunity Issues.) and is a deputy member of the judiciary committee and the committee on the rights of the child.

Milošević was also appointed as a substitute member of the Serbian parliament's delegation to the Parliamentary Assembly of the Council of Europe (PACE) after the 2022 election and was chosen for a second term in the role after the 2023 election. She serves in the PACE with the Socialists, Democrats and Greens Group and is an alternate member of the committee on equality and non-discrimination and the committee on social affairs, health, and sustainable development. From 2022 to 2024, Milošević was an alternate member of the committee on culture, science, education, and media. In an October 2025 speech to the PACE, she said: "Our future is in Europe, but not with this government (i.e., Serbia's SNS-led administration]. The citizens of Serbia want freedom, justice and the rule of law, and this regime must go in the first minimal free elections and become the dark past of our country."

The SSP is currently contesting the 2026 Serbian parliamentary election as part of the European Serbia coalition. In September 2026, Milošević indicated that she would not seek re-election on the list. Although other SSP members have criticized the party's decision to contest the elections instead of supporting the Student List, Milošević has not indicated the reason for her decision in public.
