= Dragan Đilas =

Serbian politician (born 1967)

- Драган Ђилас
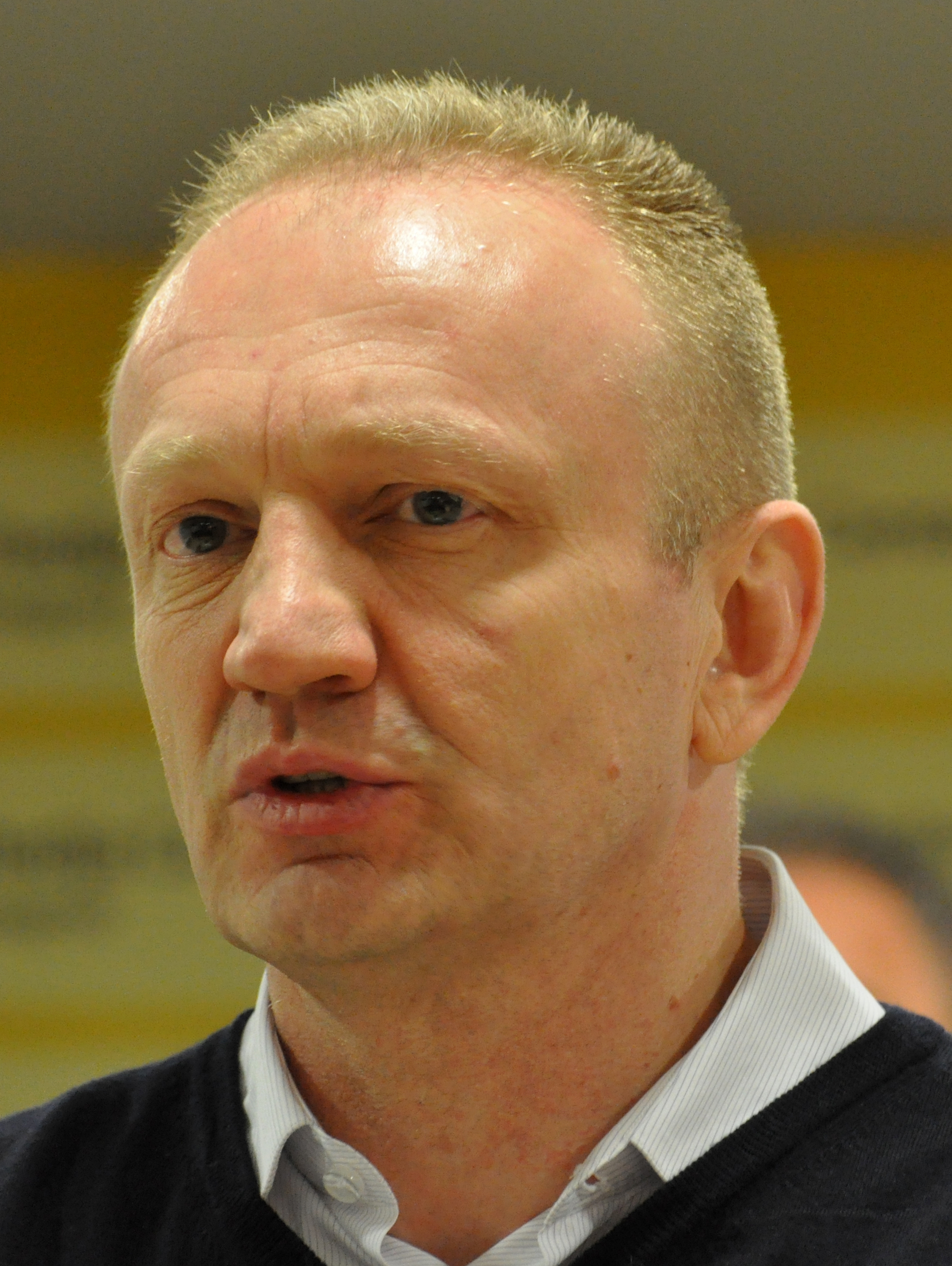
- Đilas in 2018

President of the Party of Freedom and Justice
- Incumbent
- Assumed office 19 April 2019
- Preceded by: Office established

Member of the National Assembly
- In office 6 February 2024 – 17 November 2026
- In office 16 April 2014 – 15 October 2014
- In office 31 May 2012 – 1 June 2012

President of the Democratic Party
- In office 25 November 2012 – 31 May 2014
- Preceded by: Boris Tadić
- Succeeded by: Bojan Pajtić

72nd Mayor of Belgrade
- In office 19 August 2008 – 18 November 2013
- Preceded by: Zoran Alimpić (acting)
- Succeeded by: Siniša Mali

Minister without portfolio in charge of the National Investment Plan
- In office 15 May 2007 – 7 July 2008
- Prime Minister: Vojislav Koštunica
- Preceded by: Office established
- Succeeded by: Verica Kalanović

Personal details
- Born: 22 February 1967 (age 59) Zemun, Belgrade, SR Serbia, SFR Yugoslavia
- Party: SSP (2019–present)
- Other political affiliations: DS (2004–2016)
- Spouses: Milica Delević (m. 1994; div. 2007) Iva Pelević (m. 2009; div. 2013)
- Children: 4
- Education: University of Belgrade

Dragan Đilas (Note: Serbian: Драган Ђилас, pronounced [drǎɡan d͡ʑîlaːs]) (born 22 February 1967) is a Serbian politician, businessman and media executive who has been the president of the Party of Freedom and Justice (SSP) since its founding in April 2019. He was the mayor of Belgrade from 2008 to 2013 and president of the Basketball Federation of Serbia from 2011 to 2016. A long-time member of the Democratic Party (DS), he led the party from 2012 to 2014. He was a member of the National Assembly from 2024 to 2026, having briefly held a seat twice before.

Born and raised in Belgrade, Đilas graduated in mechanical engineering from the University of Belgrade. He began his career as a journalist at Radio Index, and in 1989 co-founded Radio B92, later becoming editor of its news programme. He gained prominence in 1991 as one of the student leaders of the demonstrations against Slobodan Milošević. In 1994 he left journalism for the advertising industry, and went on to build a business career in media, advertising and sports broadcasting rights.

Đilas entered politics in the early 2000s as a close associate of President Boris Tadić. He was director of the President's People's Office from 2004 to 2007 and minister without portfolio in charge of the National Investment Plan in the second cabinet of Vojislav Koštunica from 2007 to 2008. As mayor of Belgrade, he oversaw major infrastructure projects, including the Ada Bridge and the BusPlus ticketing system. He was elected DS president in November 2012, but lost the post to Bojan Pajtić in May 2014, after the party's poor result in the 2014 parliamentary election. After a period away from politics, he returned in 2018, founding the opposition Alliance for Serbia and then the SSP, and has since led it in several opposition coalitions. In the 2026 parliamentary election, he heads the list of the "European Serbia" coalition.

A polarising figure in Serbian politics, Đilas is seen by supporters as a capable opposition leader offering a pro-European and reformist alternative to the government of Aleksandar Vučić and the Serbian Progressive Party (SNS). Critics portray him as a representative of the old political elite and accuse him of corruption and misuse of office, allegations he denies.

== Early life and education ==
Đilas was born on 22 February 1967 in Zemun, Belgrade, and was named after his paternal grandfather. His father, Dušan, was born in the village of Očigrije near Bihać, while his mother, Jovanka (née Grbić), was born in Bački Brestovac to a family originally from Plitvička Jezera in Lika. He has a younger brother, Gojko. He is not directly related to Milovan Đilas, though the two may share a distant ancestor.

Đilas lived in Zemun until the age of 12, attending the Petar Kočić Elementary School, before his family moved to New Belgrade, where he continued at the Vladimir Ilyich Lenin Elementary School. He began secondary school at the Zemun Gymnasium and later transferred to the Ninth Belgrade Gymnasium. He studied mechanical engineering at the University of Belgrade, graduating as an aeronautical engineer.

During his studies, Đilas became active in student politics. In March 1991, days after the 9 March protests, he confronted President Slobodan Milošević during a meeting with students, in a tense exchange broadcast on state television. That year, as student vice-rector, he played a prominent role in organising demonstrations against Milošević. He took part in the 1992 student protests as well, and remained engaged in anti-Milošević activism throughout the 1990s.

== Business career ==
After completing his compulsory military service in 1986, Đilas began working as a trainee journalist at Radio Index. In 1989, he was among the founders and co-owners of Radio B92, where he edited first the student programme and later the news programme, until 1994. He then left journalism to become media director at the Belgrade office of the advertising agency Saatchi & Saatchi.

In 1995, Đilas moved to Prague, where, together with his godfather Mlađan Đorđević and several friends, he founded MD International, a company dealing in sports broadcasting rights. In 1998, he co-founded the Multikom Group, which operated across the former Yugoslavia. Through Multikom, he became one of the owners of Direct Media, a major regional company in media advertising and sports rights, which was acquired by United Media in 2018. In 2000, Đilas and several associates established the production company Emotion Production, which produced programmes for B92 and other broadcasters and became best known for its reality television shows, particularly the Serbian edition of Big Brother.

Đilas has repeatedly been accused of being a hidden owner of several Serbian media outlets. He has denied involvement in their editorial policies, stating that Direct Media had only supported some newly established outlets financially through advertising.

== Political career ==
Although politically active since his youth, Đilas formally entered party politics in 2004, when he joined the Democratic Party.

=== People's Office and minister ===
On 1 October 2004, Đilas became director of the People's Office, established by the newly elected President of Serbia Boris Tadić in fulfilment of one of his campaign promises. He remained in the post until May 2007, when a new government was formed by the DS and the DSS–NS coalition, nearly five months after the January 2007 parliamentary election. He became minister without portfolio in charge of the National Investment Plan (NIP).

His time in the government was marked by bitter public clashes with Minister of Capital Investment Velimir Ilić, with whom he had feuded before joining the cabinet. In October 2007, Ilić made an angry, obscenity-laced phone call to Đilas's office, the transcript of which was published in the Serbian media. The government collapsed in March 2008, when Prime Minister Koštunica resigned amid disagreements with the DS following Kosovo's declaration of independence.

=== Mayor of Belgrade ===
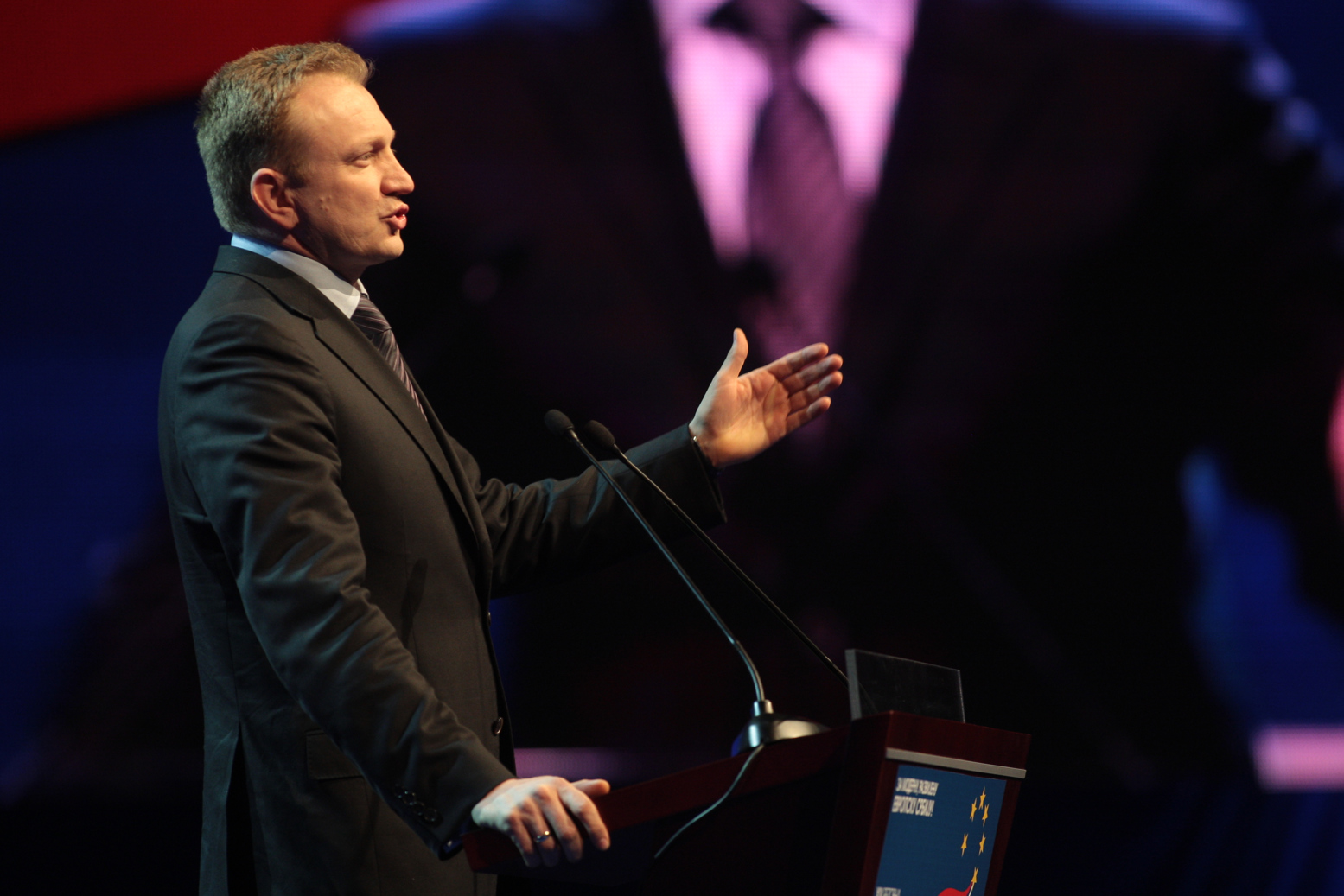
Đilas at the electoral assembly of the Democratic Party in 2010

During the 2008 Belgrade election campaign, the Liberal Democratic Party often denounced Đilas as a "tycoon" because of his personal wealth, and the slogan "Đilas tajkun" was sprayed on buildings around the city, though the party denied any link to the graffiti. On 19 August 2008, he was sworn in as mayor of Belgrade.

During his tenure, Đilas oversaw the construction of the Ada Bridge and the introduction of the BusPlus ticketing system. He also oversaw the controversial relocation of Roma settlements in the city. In August 2009, around 200 homes in the Gazela settlement were demolished and 178 Roma families forcibly evicted with minimal notice; 114 families were moved to metal containers on the outskirts of Belgrade, while 64 were sent to municipalities in southern Serbia. The evictions were carried out under the city's action plan for dismantling unhygienic settlements, adopted in May 2009, and were linked to infrastructure projects including the reconstruction of the Gazela Bridge. Amnesty International and Human Rights Watch criticised them for violating international human rights standards, citing inadequate consultation, insufficient alternative housing, lack of compensation and failure to meet conditions set by the European Bank for Reconstruction and Development.

Đilas was dismissed as mayor on 18 November 2013, and Siniša Mali was appointed president of the temporary council of Belgrade.

=== President of the Democratic Party ===
In November 2012, Đilas was elected president of the Democratic Party, succeeding Boris Tadić. After the party's poor result in the 2014 parliamentary election, an extraordinary party congress was held in May 2014, at which he lost the presidency to Bojan Pajtić. In October 2014, he resigned his seat in the National Assembly and withdrew from public life. He left the DS in June 2016, declining to comment on his reasons.

=== Alliance for Serbia ===
After his list won 18.93% of the vote in the 2018 Belgrade City Assembly election, Đilas announced the formation of a broad opposition alliance as a counterweight to the ruling SNS, aiming to gather opposition parties regardless of ideology. The Alliance for Serbia (SzS) was formally established in September 2018, bringing together centre-left parties such as the DS and centre-right parties such as the People's Party. Because the right-wing Dveri were admitted, some liberal and left-leaning organisations, notably Saša Janković's Movement of Free Citizens, declined to join, though they said they were willing to cooperate on specific issues such as electoral conditions.

=== Party of Freedom and Justice ===
The Party of Freedom and Justice was founded in the Belgrade municipality of Stari Grad on 19 April 2019. Đilas was elected party president, with Borko Stefanović as deputy leader and Marinika Tepić and Dejan Bulatović as vice-presidents. The party avoided the usual registration process when Bulatović allowed his Green Ecological Party – Greens to be re-constituted as the SSP, making the SSP its legal successor. In 2020, the SSP boycotted the parliamentary election together with much of the opposition.

Ahead of the 2022 general election, the SSP's Main Board proposed Zdravko Ponoš, then a member of the People's Party, as the joint opposition presidential candidate in January 2022. The People's Party initially objected that it had learned of the decision from the media, as the coalition agreement signed in November 2021 required the candidate to be chosen by consensus. The DS and then the People's Party subsequently backed the nomination, and Ponoš ran as the candidate of the United for the Victory of Serbia coalition, of which the SSP was a member.

In the December 2023 parliamentary election, the SSP ran as part of the Serbia Against Violence coalition, and Đilas was third on its list. He took his seat in the National Assembly on 6 February 2024.

For the 2026 Serbian parliamentary election, the SSP formed the "European Serbia" coalition with Zdravko Ponoš's Serbia Centre (SRCE) and Goran Ješić's Solidarity movement, with Marinika Tepić and Ponoš as the list's leading figures. Đilas said the coalition's main goals were Serbia's membership in the European Union and a standard of living comparable to that of EU citizens. Unlike several other opposition parties, the SSP did not withdraw in favour of the Student List. The list, proclaimed by the Republic Electoral Commission with Đilas in first place, had 246 candidates after several senior SSP officials, including deputy leader Borko Stefanović, withdrew their names before it was submitted.

== Political positions ==
=== European Union and NATO ===
Đilas supports Serbia's accession to the European Union, describing the citizens of Serbia as "part of the European family of nations" and EU membership as Serbia's strategic goal.

In April 2014, he called the idea of Serbia seeking compensation from NATO countries for the 1999 bombing "unfounded", although he said the damage inflicted had been "enormous". Asked in 2021 whether NATO membership would speed up EU accession, he said that Serbia had been "destroyed in the NATO bombing" and that it was therefore "pointless" to discuss membership, but that Serbia should continue its long-standing cooperation with NATO "for the security of all who live in this part of Europe".

=== Kosovo ===
Đilas has said that the solution for Kosovo is "not partition, but reconciliation", and that Kosovo belongs to both Serbs and Albanians. In September 2019, he said his party's reconciliation plan would exclude people who had committed or incited war crimes, and in October 2019 that he would "never sign an agreement recognising Kosovo's independence", calling it contrary to Serbian and international law.

=== Economy ===
In an article published by Nova srpska politička misao, Đilas argued for a form of state capitalism, writing that only state investment, primarily in agriculture and energy, could restart the Serbian economy. Instead of privatising PKB, he proposed a system of state-owned agricultural enterprises to support agriculture and the food industry.

== Personal life ==
Đilas is the founder and vice-president of Naša Srbija ("Our Serbia"), a humanitarian organisation supporting Serbian children who lost one or both parents in the Yugoslav Wars.

In 1994, he married Milica Delević, who later headed the Office for Cooperation with the European Union of the Council of Ministers of Serbia and Montenegro (2003–2004), served as deputy to Foreign Minister Vuk Jeremić (2007–2008) and directed the Serbian Government's Office for European Integration (2008–2012). They have two daughters, Sofija and Jovana, and divorced in 2007. In September 2009, Đilas married Iva Pelević, a physician, with whom he had a daughter, Ana, and a son, Vuk. They divorced in 2013.

== Notes ==
Civic offices
New title	Director of the People's Office of the President; 2004–2007	Succeeded by Tatjana Pašić
Political offices
New title	Minister without portfolio in charge of the National Investment Plan; 2007–2008	Succeeded by Verica Kalanović
Preceded by Zoran Alimpić (acting)	Mayor of Belgrade; 2008–2013	Succeeded by Siniša Mali
Party political offices
Preceded by Boris Tadić	President of the Democratic Party; 2012–2014	Succeeded by Bojan Pajtić
New title	President of the Party of Freedom and Justice; 2019–present	Incumbent
Sporting positions
Preceded by Dragan Kapičić	President of the Basketball Federation of Serbia; 2011–2016	Succeeded by Predrag Danilović
