= Marinika Tepić =

Serbian politician

- Мариника Тепић
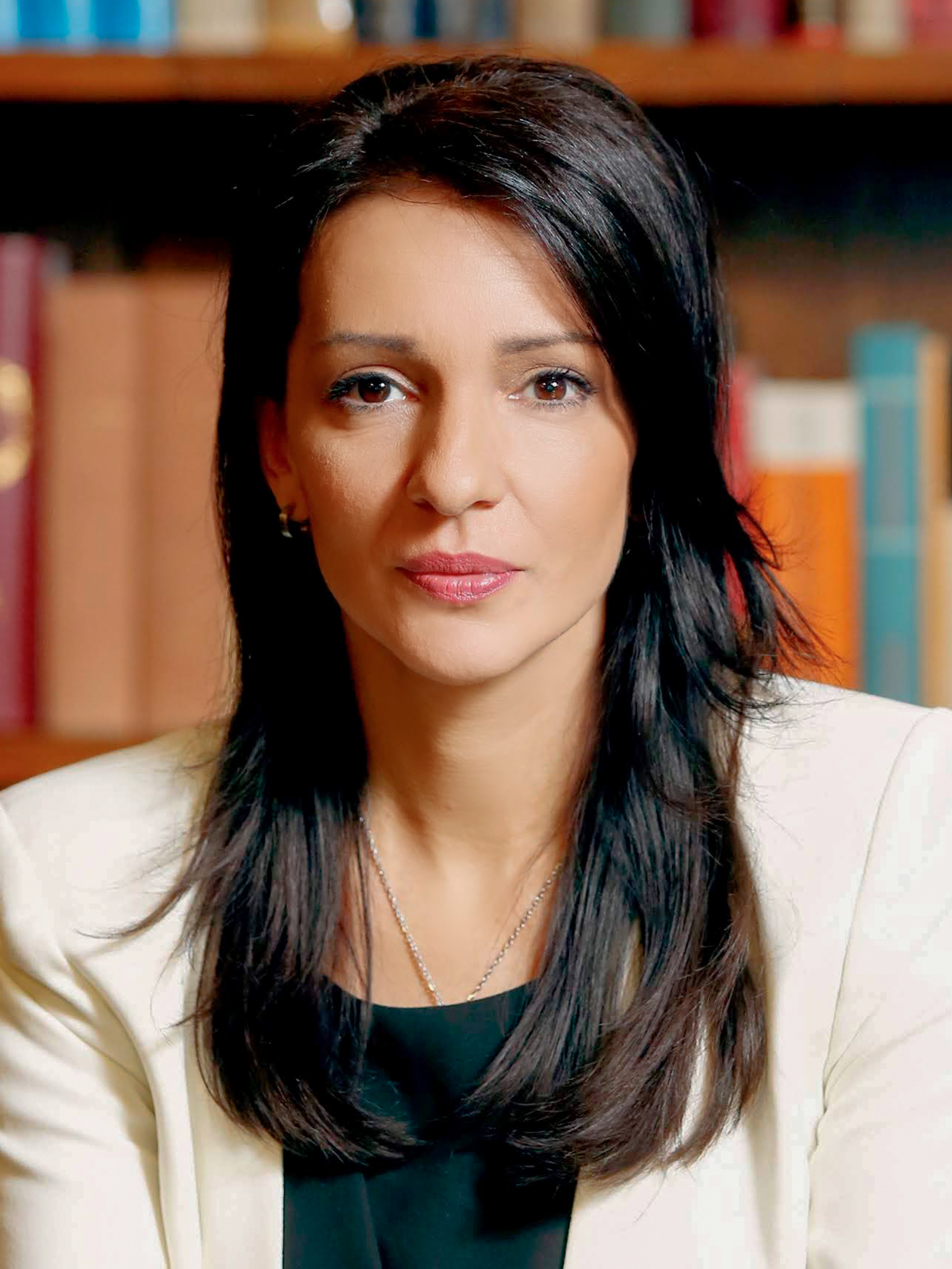
- Tepić in 2021

Member of the National Assembly of the Republic of Serbia
- In office 1 August 2022 – 17 November 2026
- In office 3 June 2016 – 3 August 2020
- In office 16 April 2014 – 24 April 2014

Secretary for Sports and Youth in the Government of Vojvodina
- In office 11 July 2012 – 20 June 2016
- Preceded by: Modest Dulić
- Succeeded by: Vladimir Batez

Personal details
- Born: Marinika Čobanu; 8 August 1974 (age 52) Pančevo, SAP Vojvodina, SR Serbia, SFR Yugoslavia
- Party: LSV (2008–17); Nova (2017–18); SSP (2019–present)
- Spouse: Milan Tepić
- Children: 2
- Education: University of Belgrade

Marinika Tepić (née Čobanu; (Note: Serbian Cyrillic: Мариника Тепић, née Чобану; Romanian: Marinica Tepici, née Ciobanu) born 8 August 1974) is a Serbian politician. She is a vice-president of the Party of Freedom and Justice (SSP) and a prominent opponent of Aleksandar Vučić and the governing Serbian Progressive Party (SNS).

Tepić was secretary for sports and youth in the government of Vojvodina from 2012 to 2016 and has served several terms in the National Assembly of Serbia. Prior to joining the SSP on its formation in 2019, she was at different times a member of the League of Social Democrats of Vojvodina (LSV) and the New Party (Nova). She is now the leader of the SSP group in the national assembly.

She has frequently accused Aleksandar Vučić of undermining Serbia's democratic institutions and of stealing elections to remain in power.

== Early life and career ==
Tepić was born to an ethnic Romanian family in Pančevo, in what was then the Socialist Autonomous Province of Vojvodina in the Socialist Republic of Serbia, Socialist Federal Republic of Yugoslavia. She graduated from the University of Belgrade Faculty of Philology in 1995 in English and Romanian languages and, in the same year, began teaching elementary school English in Pančevo. She was a professional journalist from 1997 to 2009, writing and reporting for Radio 021, Danas, and the Romanian language publication Libertatea, among other outlets. Tepić is also a veteran human rights and minority rights campaigner and has served as the deputy director for the National Council for the Decentralization of the Republic of Serbia.

== Politician ==
=== Local politics (2008–16) ===
Tepić was a member of Pančevo's election commission during the 2008 Serbian local elections. She appeared in the lead position on the LSV's electoral list for the Pančevo city assembly in the 2012 local elections and was elected when the list won five mandates. She resigned her seat on 16 July 2012 after being appointed to the provincial executive.

She again led the LSV list for Pančevo in the 2016 local elections and was re-elected when the list won six seats. She resigned her local mandate on 4 July 2016, this time after taking a seat in the national assembly.

=== Vojvodina government minister (2012–16) ===
Tepić received the twenty-fourth position on the LSV's electoral list in the 2012 Vojvodina provincial election. The list won eight seats, and she was not elected. The Democratic Party (DS) and its allies won the election and formed a coalition government that included the LSV, and Tepić was appointed as secretary for sports and youth in Bojan Pajtić's administration.

In 2013, Tepić oversaw the introduction of the first sex education classes in the province, following a ten-month consultation process. In announcing the program, she said that it had the support of ninety-five per cent of parents surveyed by the secretariat. This notwithstanding, some educational material provoked a backlash from socially conservative groups; the Democratic Party of Serbia (DSS), which held four seats in the assembly, argued that one publication "promoted homosexuality" and that Tepić should resign as secretary. She defended the material and remained in her position.

She appeared in the sixth position on the LSV's list in the 2016 provincial election and was elected to the provincial assembly when the party won nine seats. She declined her mandate in order to serve in the national assembly, to which she had been elected in the concurrent 2016 Serbian parliamentary election. The Serbian Progressive Party (SNS) and its allies won majority victories at both the republican and provincial levels; a new SNS-led government was formed in Vojvodina, and Tepić stood down from her cabinet role on 20 June 2016.

=== Member of the National Assembly (2014, 2016–20, 2022–present) ===
==== League of Social Democrats of Vojvodina ====
The LSV contested the 2014 Serbian parliamentary election on the list of former Serbian president Boris Tadić. Tepić received the sixth position on the list and was elected when Tadić's alliance won eighteen mandates. Her first term in the national assembly was brief; she resigned her seat soon after the assembly convened in order to continue serving on the provincial executive.

For the 2016 parliamentary election, Tepić received the eleventh position on a coalition list that included the LSV, the Liberal Democratic Party (LDP) and the Social Democratic Party (SDS). She was re-elected when the list won thirteen mandates. The Progressive Party and its allies won the election, and Tepić served in opposition; this notwithstanding, she was appointed as head of the assembly's committee on European integration. She was also a deputy member of the administrative committee, (Note: Formally known as the Committee on Administrative, Budgetary, Mandate, and Immunity Issues.) the committee on the rights of the child, and the committee on human and minority rights and gender equality; a substitute member of Serbia's delegation to the parliamentary dimension of the Central European Initiative; and a member of the parliamentary friendship groups with Germany, Italy, and The Netherlands.

Tepić resigned from the LSV in January 2017, in protest against party leader Nenad Čanak's decision to contest the 2017 Serbian presidential election rather than supporting the candidacy of Saša Janković. She served afterward on Janković's political committee. Janković ultimately finished second against Aleksandar Vučić. In April 2017, having lost her party affiliation, Tepić was removed from her committee assignments in the national assembly at the LSV's discretion.

==== New Party ====
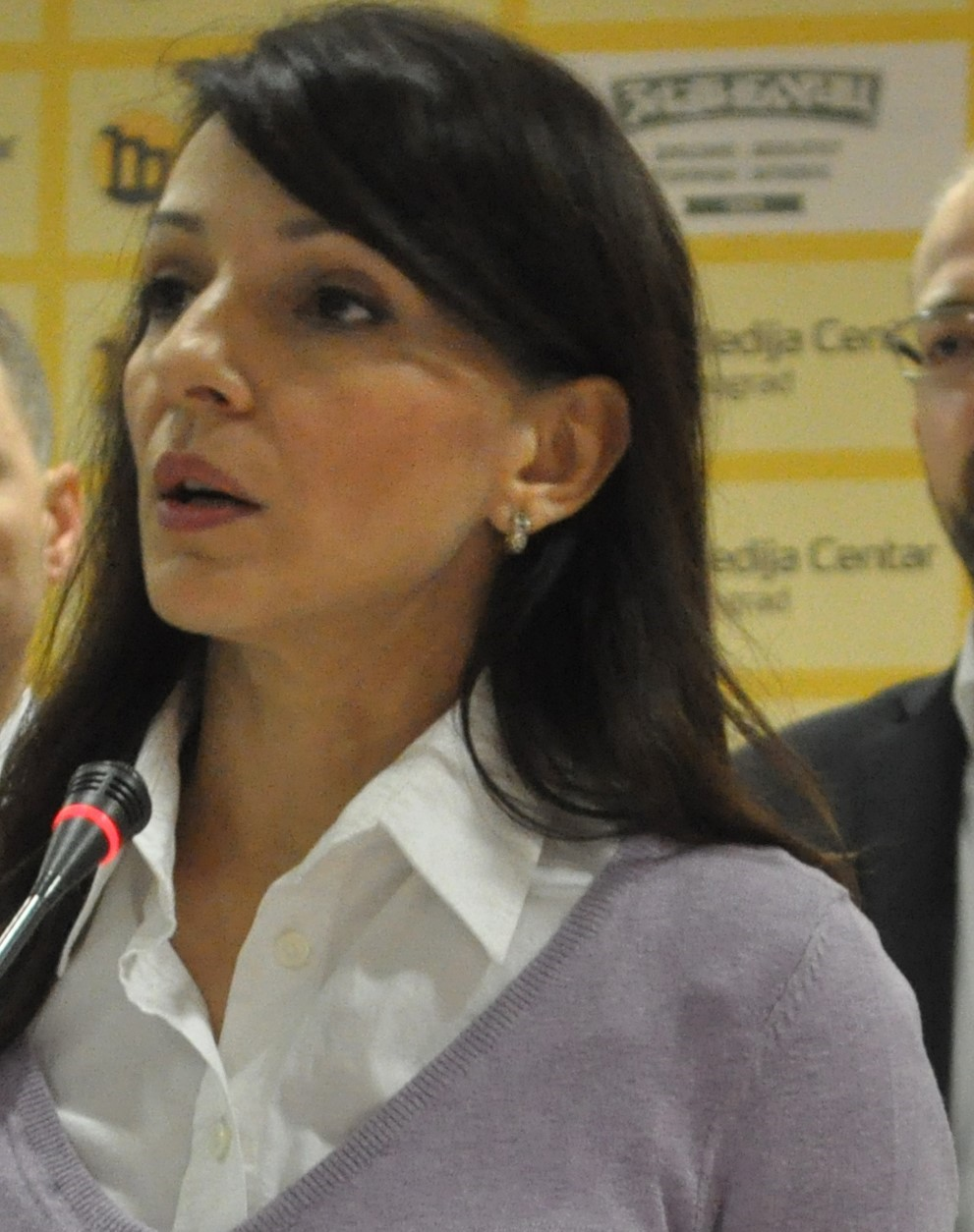
Tepić in 2018

Tepić joined the New Party in April 2017, becoming its second member in the national assembly after party leader Zoran Živković. She was appointed to the party's presidency and was named as its provincial leader in Vojvodina. The following month, Živković and Tepić joined with three former members of the Enough Is Enough (DJB) association to start a parliamentary group called the Independent MPs Club.

Tepić, a vocal opponent of fascism, was harassed by anonymous graffiti messages from extreme right-wing groups in 2017; one such message read, "Corneliu Codreanu, not Marinika Čobanu." The New Party condemned these messages and accused Serbia's government and state organs of condoning them. In the same period, Tepić reported receiving death threats from right-wing groups, and Živković urged the government to assess whether she required protection. Meho Omerović, the chair of the assembly's committee on human and minority rights, condemned the threats against her and urged the police to ensure her safety.

The New Party contested the 2018 Belgrade City Assembly election in a coalition with the Democratic Party and the Social Democratic Party; their combined list did not cross the electoral threshold. Tepić resigned her leadership positions in New Party in April 2018, saying that it had failed to respond properly to its defeat. Some media sources reported that she had resigned from the party, but she clarified that she was still a member and, moreover, was not calling for Živković's resignation. By September of the same year, however, she was no longer actively involved with the party.

==== Party of Freedom and Justice ====
On 19 April 2019, Tepić was elected as a vice-president of the newly formed Party of Freedom and Justice (SSP). Like several other opposition parties, the SSP began a policy of non-participation with state institutions, including the national assembly, in 2019 and ultimately boycotted the 2020 parliamentary election.

After joining the SSP, Tepić emerged as one of the most vocal critics of Aleksandar Vučić's presidency and Serbia's SNS-led administration. She has accused the regime of involvement with organised crime groups, charging that the government created the notorious Belivuk clan before turning against it. In April 2021, she accused Dragan Marković, the leader of the United Serbia (JS) party and an ally of the SNS-led administration, of organising the prostitution of women and girls, some underage, at a prominent nightclub in his home community of Jagodina. She also accused the regime of shielding Marković from prosecution. (An investigation was launched shortly after Tepić first made her charges. Marković responded that the accusations against him were "lies" and brought a lawsuit against Tepić in early 2022. The matter reached an impasse shortly thereafter and has never been fully resolved.)

Serbia's opposition parties ended their boycott of the electoral process in 2022. Tepić appeared in the lead position on the United for the Victory of Serbia list in the 2022 parliamentary election and was elected to a third term when the list won thirty-eight seats. The SNS and its allies once again won the election, and in the parliament that followed Tepić led an assembly group comprising the SSP, the Movement of Free Citizens (PSG), the Movement for Reversal (PZP), the United Trade Unions of Serbia "Sloga", and some independent delegates. She was also a member of the security services control committee, a deputy member of the defence and internal affairs committee, and the chair of Serbia's delegation on the European Union–Serbia stabilisation and association committee.

On 1 June 2022, Tepić voiced her support for sanctioning Russia due to the ongoing Russian invasion of Ukraine.

The SSP contested the 2023 parliamentary election as part of the Serbia Against Violence (SPN) coalition. Tepić appeared in the sixth position on the coalition's list and was elected to a fourth assembly term when it won sixty-five seats. The SNS and its allies again won the election. Tepić afterward accused Vučić and the SNS of achieving their victory via fraud and took part in a high-profile hunger strike in protest. Beyond the specific issue of the 2023 election results, she also said that she had "a duty to fight for democracy and [Serbia]'s European future, rather than being in Russia's orbit." She ended the strike after twelve days on 30 December 2023, saying that it had achieved its goal of bringing international attention to what she described as the "shameless election theft in Serbia." She was quoted as saying, "The entire international community has now found out that this regime is maintained in power thanks to a false image, false results, false elections, false voters, fraudsters and thieves in power."

Tepić now leads the SSP assembly group and is a member of the European integration committee, the security services control committee, and the stabilisation and association committee, as well as being a deputy member of the education committee (Note: Formally known as the Committee on Education, Science, Technological Development, and the Information Society.) and the defence and internal affairs committee.
