= 2026 Serbian parliamentary election =

- 25 October 2026
- All 250 seats in the National Assembly; 126 seats needed for a majority
- Opinion polls
- Turnout: 68.89% (▲10.12pp)
| Electoral list | Leader | Vote % | Seats | +/– |
|---|---|---|---|---|
| SL | None (Note: The list has no ballot carrier; Ilija Srdanović is the first candidate on the list.) | 53.69 | 140 | New |
| AV–US | Aleksandar Vučić (Note: Vučić was the list's ballot carrier and first candidate; Miloš Vučević is the president of the Serbian Progressive Party.) | 39.48 | 103 | −26 |
Minority lists
| VMSZ | Bálint Pásztor | 0.81 | 2 | −4 |
| KShLP | None (Note: The list has no ballot carrier; Shaip Kamberi is the first candidate on the list.) | 0.62 | 2 | +1 |
| Ljudski | Rasim Ljajić (Note: Ljajić is the list's ballot carrier but not a candidate on it; Dženan Palamar is the first candidate on the list.) | 0.46 | 1 | New |
| SDAS | None (Note: The list has no ballot carrier; Ahmedin Škrijelj is the first candidate on the list.) | 0.28 | 1 | −1 |
| SPP | Usame Zukorlić | 0.28 | 1 | −1 |
This lists parties that won seats. See the complete results below.
| Prime Minister before | Prime Minister after |
|---|---|
| Đuro Macut; Independent | TBD |

Early parliamentary elections were held in Serbia on 25 October 2026 to elect members of the National Assembly. The elections were originally due by December 2027; Aleksandar Vučić, then the president of Serbia, dissolved the National Assembly and called the elections on 9 September 2026, on the proposal of the government. The Student List (SL) won the election with an absolute majority of seats, defeating the Serbian Progressive Party (SNS), which had been in power since 2012. According to the final results announced by the Republic Electoral Commission (RIK) on 5 November, after voting had been repeated at 53 polling stations on 1 November, the Student List won 53.69% of the vote and 140 of the 250 seats, while the SNS-led "Aleksandar Vučić – United Serbia" list won 39.48% and 103 seats; apart from five national minority lists, which are exempt from the electoral threshold, no other list won seats. Turnout was 68.89%, about ten percentage points higher than in 2023. Vučić conceded defeat on election night. The election was followed by resignations at the public broadcasters and by arrests of officials and businesspeople linked to SNS.

The SNS came to power in 2012 after forming a government with the Socialist Party of Serbia (SPS). In the 2023 parliamentary election, SNS regained its parliamentary majority. Protests were briefly organised after the elections due to alleged electoral fraud. Miloš Vučević became the prime minister of Serbia in May 2024. In the aftermath of the Novi Sad railway station canopy collapse in November 2024, the student-led anti-corruption protests began, while Vučević announced his resignation from office in January 2025. He was succeeded by Đuro Macut in April. In 2026, changes to several election laws were adopted by the National Assembly.

The SNS nominated Vučić as its candidate for prime minister and the head of its electoral list, "Aleksandar Vučić – United Serbia"; he resigned as president on 27 September, with Ana Brnabić, the president of the National Assembly, becoming acting president. The students contested the elections as the Student List, headed by Ilija Srdanović, which was endorsed by several parliamentary and extra-parliamentary parties, several of which withdrew their own lists in its favour. Opposition parties that did not withdraw, including the pro-European "European Serbia" coalition and the nationalist "Authentic Right", faced accusations of being a "false opposition" (lažna opozicija), acting as spoilers in favour of SNS. The campaign ended with the start of the election silence on 23 October, while the presidential election triggered by Vučić's resignation must be held by 27 December 2026.

== Background ==
A populist coalition, led by the Serbian Progressive Party (SNS), came to power after the 2012 election, along with the Socialist Party of Serbia (SPS). Aleksandar Vučić, who initially served as deputy prime minister of Serbia and later as prime minister of Serbia, was elected president of Serbia in 2017 and re-elected in 2022. Since he came to power, observers have assessed that Serbia has suffered from democratic backsliding into authoritarianism, followed by a decline in media freedom and civil liberties. The V-Dem Institute has categorised Serbia as an electoral autocracy since 2014, while Freedom House noted in 2024 that SNS "eroded political rights and civil liberties, put pressure on independent media, the opposition, and civil society organisations". On the other hand, supporters highlight the pragmatism of SNS and Vučić, as well as economic growth.

On 17 December 2023, a snap parliamentary election was held in Serbia. The election resulted in a victory of the SNS-led Serbia Must Not Stop electoral alliance that won a majority of seats in the National Assembly of Serbia. The second place was obtained by Serbia Against Violence (SPN), a broad coalition of opposition parties, that won 65 seats in total. The SPS electoral alliance, however, collapsed in popularity and only won 18 seats, its worst result since the 2007 parliamentary election. According to non-governmental and monitoring organisations, election day was marked by electoral fraud and irregularities such as the Bulgarian train and vote buying. After the election, protests were held up to 30 December, with its organisers, including SPN, calling for the results to be annulled. Amidst the protests, a riot occurred after an unsuccessful attempt from opposition councillors to enter the building of the City Assembly of Belgrade. After several months of negotiations, SNS formed a new government on 2 May, with Miloš Vučević, the president of SNS, as prime minister.

=== Student-led protests ===
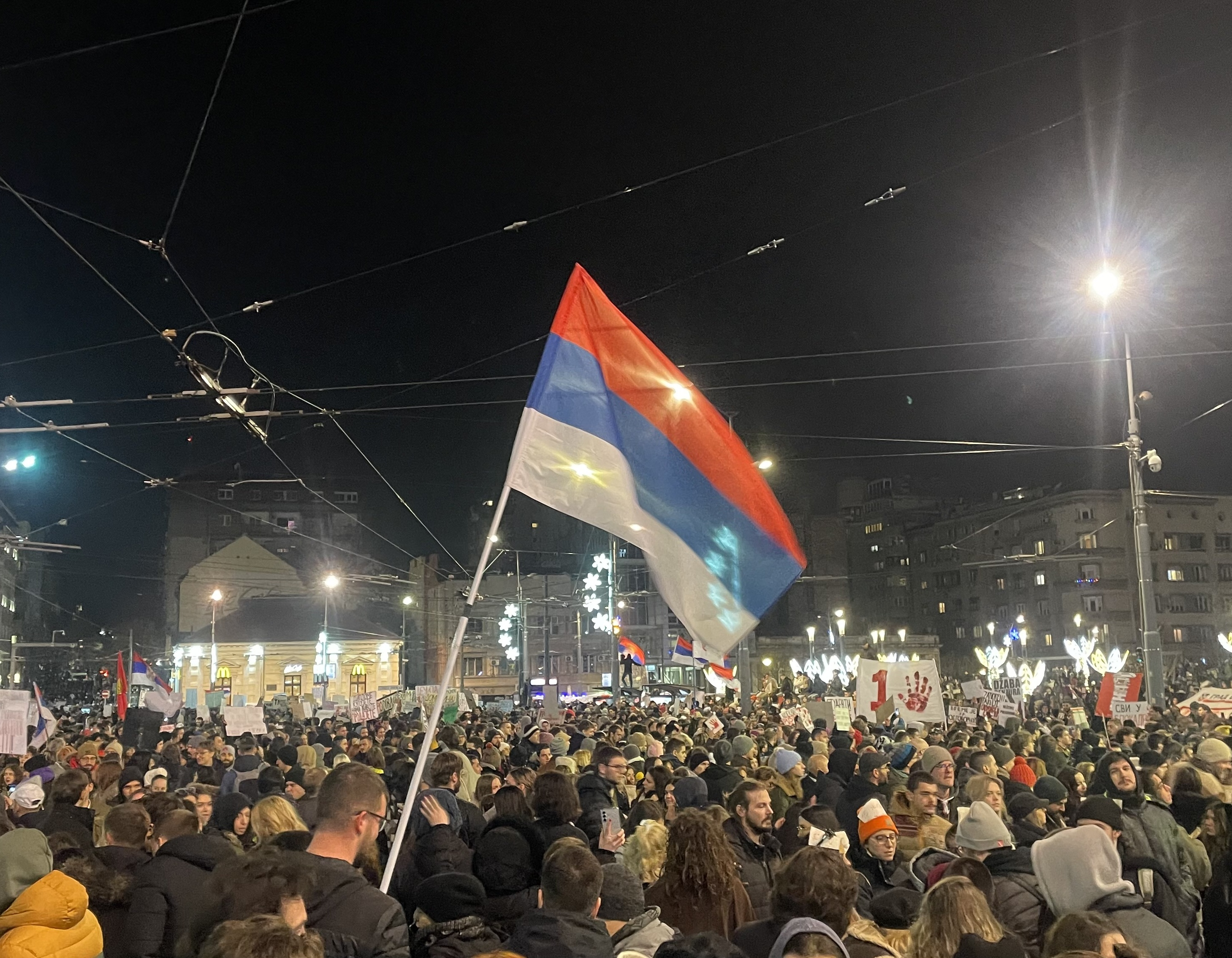
Since 2024, student-led protests have been organised in Serbia, with one of their demands being to call a snap parliamentary election

In the aftermath of the Novi Sad railway station canopy collapse in November 2024, ministers Goran Vesić and Tomislav Momirović announced their resignation from office. Their resignation was acknowledged by the National Assembly on 25 November. Student-led anti-corruption protests also began in November 2024, with one of the demands being the release of Novi Sad railway station canopy documents to the public. An estimated 100,000 demonstrators attended the protest on Slavija Square on 22 December. A series of acts of civil disobedience, promoted as a "general strike", took place on 24 January 2025. An estimated 325,000 or more demonstrators attended the protest on 15 March 2025.

After a group of students were physically attacked in Novi Sad, Vučević announced his resignation from office on 28 January. His resignation was acknowledged by the National Assembly on 19 March. Đuro Macut succeeded Vučević as prime minister on 16 April. Macut is the third independent politician to be nominated for the office of prime minister of Serbia. After his appointment, the student movement demanded a snap parliamentary election and announced that it would take part in it.

As of September 2026, the protests were still ongoing. The largest protest of 2026 was held at Slavija on 23 May and was attended by between 180,000 and 190,000 people, according to the non-governmental organisation Archive of Public Gatherings.

== Electoral system ==
The 250 members of the National Assembly are elected by closed-list proportional representation from a single nationwide constituency. Eligible voters vote for electoral lists, on which the candidates of the accepted lists are present. A maximum of 250 candidates could be present on a single electoral list. An electoral list could be submitted by a registered political party, a coalition of political parties, or a citizens' group. To submit an electoral list, at least 10,000 valid signatures must be collected, though ethnic minority parties only need to collect 5,000 signatures to qualify on the ballot. At least 40% of candidates on electoral lists must be female. The electoral list is submitted by its chosen representative or representatives. An electoral list could be declined, after which those who submitted it can fix the deficiencies in a span of 48 hours, or rejected, if the person is not authorised to nominate candidates. The name and date of the election, names of the electoral lists and its representatives, and information on how to vote are only present on the voting ballot.

The Republic Electoral Commission (RIK), local election commissions, and polling boards oversee the election. Seats are allocated using the d'Hondt method with an electoral threshold of 3% of all votes cast, although the threshold is waived for ethnic minority parties. The seats are distributed by dividing the total number of votes received by the electoral list participating in the distribution of seats by each number from one to 250. If two or more electoral lists receive the same quotients on the basis of which the seat is distributed, the electoral list that received the greater number of votes has priority. Parliamentary seats are awarded to candidates from electoral lists according to their order, starting with the first candidate from an electoral list.

A parliamentary election is called by the president of Serbia, who must also announce its date and dissolve the National Assembly in the process. To vote, a person must be a citizen and resident of Serbia and at least 18 years old. Those who live abroad are able to vote at diplomatic missions. At least five days before the election, citizens are notified about the election; they receive information about the day and time of the election and the address of the polling station where they can vote. Election silence begins two days before the day of the election and lasts until the closure of all polling stations. On election day, eligible voters are able to vote from 07:00 (UTC+01:00) to 20:00, except that if the polling station opens later than 07:00, voting is then extended by the amount of time by which its opening was delayed. Voters who are unable to vote at polling stations due to illness, old age, or disability must inform their election commission between 7:00 and 11:00 in order to vote from home on election day after 11:00.

=== Election date ===
The National Assembly is elected for a four-year term; following the December 2023 election, the next regular parliamentary election was due by 31 December 2027, although an early election may be called if the National Assembly is dissolved. Vučić announced in 2024 that the next parliamentary election and presidential election would be held on the same date in 2027, thus making it a general election. Vučević also said that elections would not be held before 2027. However, Darko Glišić, the president of the executive board of SNS, said that there could still be a possibility of holding elections earlier despite the government's plan being to complete the entire four-year mandate. Political analyst Dragomir Anđelković argued that the next parliamentary election would be only held after the completion of the Expo 2027 fair and the expansion of the Belgrade Waterfront project.

During the student-led anti-corruption protests, Vučić and Vučević suggested holding snap elections in response to the opposition's call for the formation of a transitional government. In the aftermath of Vučević's resignation announcement, it was suggested that either snap elections would be called or a new government would be formed. In March 2025, Vučić suggested holding elections on 1 or 8 June if a new government was not formed by 18 April. However, in early April, Vučić nominated Đuro Macut as Vučević's successor; Macut became prime minister on 16 April. In December 2025, Vučić suggested that elections could be held in May or December 2026, while in May 2026 he suggested that they could be held in autumn.

In April 2026, Bloomberg Adria reported that the elections could be called as early as May 2026 and no later than March 2027. Vučić also suggested that the elections could be held by Vidovdan (28 June). He then held consultations with various political parties about early elections, including the Movement of Socialists (PS), Alliance of Vojvodina Hungarians (VMSZ), Justice and Reconciliation Party (SPP), Party of United Pensioners of Serbia (PUPS), We – Voice from the People (MI–GIN), SPS, Democratic Alliance of Croats in Vojvodina, Social Democratic Party of Serbia (SDPS), SNS, and United Trade Unions of Serbia "Sloga". Opposition parties declined to take part in the consultations. Aleksandar Vulin of PS, Bálint Pásztor of VMSZ, and Branko Pavlović of MI–GIN said that they opposed early elections, while Usame Zukorlić of SPP said that his party was ready for early elections. PUPS and SDPS expressed concern about the current political atmosphere, while Vučević of SNS said that his party "is always ready for elections" (spremna za izbore kad god budu održani). Vučić later consulted with United Serbia (JS), Greens of Serbia (Zeleni), Russian Party (RS), People's Party (Narodna), Alternative for Changes (AZP), United Peasant Party (USS), Strength of Serbia Movement (PSS), Serbian Renewal Movement (SPO), and Serbian Radical Party (SRS).

In August 2026, Vučić said that the elections could be held on either 18 or 25 October; he would have had to call them by 3 or 10 September, respectively. On 2 September, Radio Television of Serbia reported that the elections would be held on 25 October. Following a reasoned proposal from the government on 7 September, Vučić dissolved the National Assembly and called the elections on 9 September.

=== Election conditions ===
After the election protests, the European Parliament adopted a resolution regarding the 2023 parliamentary election in February 2024, calling for it to be internationally investigated. The Office for Democratic Institutions and Human Rights (ODIHR) also published a report on elections, concluding that it was marked with numerous irregularities and the abuse of public institutions. In response to ODIHR's recommendation of initiating further changes to improve election conditions, the National Assembly of Serbia formed a working body on improving election conditions in April 2024. At its first session, Nemanja Nenadić, the director of Transparency Serbia, was elected its chairman. Nenadić announced that the proposed changes would have to be voted by the National Assembly by July 2025. However, in February 2025, opposition parties and non-government organisations, such as Transparency Serbia and CRTA, left the working body on improving election conditions due to obstructions from the government.

In response to the 2024 Belgrade City Assembly election, ODIHR published another report in which it concluded that the election was again marked by irregularities. ODIHR representatives further met with minister Jelena Žarić Kovačević and RIK representatives in September 2024. The representatives of opposition parties boycotted the public hearing of the Committee for Constitutional Issues and Legislation in January 2025, where the amendments of the Law on the Unified Voter List were presented, citing obstruction from the government to improve election conditions and the voter list.

In May 2026, the National Assembly adopted changes to several election laws, dubbed "Petrašinović's Laws", which the government presented as implementing ODIHR recommendations published after the 2023 parliamentary election. Among the changes, a voter may now sign in support of more than one electoral list. The political opposition and non-governmental organisations criticised the changes, while Marta Kos, the European Commissioner for Enlargement, described them as a "first step towards free and fair elections". ODIHR commented on the adoption of the laws, noting that major suggestions that were recommended several years ago still have not been addressed. This was also repeated by the director of Transparency Serbia. Brnabić, however, said that over 70% of ODIHR's recommendations had been adopted.

=== Political parties ===
The table below lists political parties and coalitions elected to the National Assembly after the 2023 parliamentary election. The final results were published on 3 January 2024.

| Name | Ideology | Political position | Leader(s) | 2023 result | |
| Name | Ideology | Political position | Leader(s) | Votes (%) | Seats |
|---|---|---|---|---|---|
| Serbia Must Not Stop | Populism | Big tent | Miloš Vučević | 48.07% | 129 / 250 |
| Serbia Against Violence | Anti-corruption | Big tent | Marinika Tepić; Miroslav Aleksić | 24.32% | 65 / 250 |
| SPS–JS–Zeleni | Populism | Big tent | Ivica Dačić | 6.73% | 18 / 250 |
| National Democratic Alternative | National conservatism | Right-wing | Miloš Jovanović | 5.16% | 13 / 250 |
| We – Voice from the People | Right-wing populism | Right-wing | Collective leadership | 4.82% | 13 / 250 |
| Alliance of Vojvodina Hungarians | Hungarian minority interests | | Bálint Pásztor | 1.74% | 6 / 250 |
| SPP–DSHV | Bosniak minority interests; Croat minority interests | | Usame Zukorlić | 0.78% | 2 / 250 |
| SDA Sandžaka | Bosniak minority interests | | Sulejman Ugljanin | 0.59% | 2 / 250 |
| Political Struggle of the Albanians Continues | Albanian minority interests | | Shaip Kamberi | 0.36% | 1 / 250 |
| RS–NKPJ | Russophilia | | Slobodan Nikolić | 0.31% | 1 / 250 |
Source: Republic Bureau of Statistics

=== Pre-election composition ===
The fourteenth convocation of the National Assembly held its constitutive session on 6 February 2024, at which the parliamentary composition was formalised. Ana Brnabić of SNS was elected president of the National Assembly on 19 March, while Sandra Božić (SNS), Marina Raguš (SNS), Snežana Paunović (SPS), Elvira Kovács (Alliance of Vojvodina Hungarians, VMSZ), Edin Đerlek (Justice and Reconciliation Party, SPP), and Jovan Janjić (We – Voice from the People, MI–GIN) were elected vice-presidents. Božić remained vice-president until May 2024, when she became the vice-president of the government of Vojvodina. Nevena Đurić was elected vice-president in March 2025. Dunja Simonović Bratić (SPS) later succeeded Paunović as vice-president. The National Assembly was dissolved on 9 September 2026.

Parliamentary composition at dissolution (9 September 2026)
| Groups | Parties | MPs | |
| Groups | Parties | Seats | Total |
|---|---|---|---|
| Aleksandar Vučić – Serbia Must Not Stop | SNS | 105 | 110 |
| Aleksandar Vučić – Serbia Must Not Stop | SPO | 2 | 110 |
| Aleksandar Vučić – Serbia Must Not Stop | SNP | 1 | 110 |
| Aleksandar Vučić – Serbia Must Not Stop | NSS | 1 | 110 |
| Aleksandar Vučić – Serbia Must Not Stop | SSD | 1 | 110 |
| Deputies with the Students: For Election Control | DS | 8 | 16 |
| Deputies with the Students: For Election Control | POKS | 3 | 16 |
| Deputies with the Students: For Election Control | NPS | 2 | 16 |
| Deputies with the Students: For Election Control | SSP | 1 | 16 |
| Deputies with the Students: For Election Control | ZS | 1 | 16 |
| Deputies with the Students: For Election Control | Ind. | 1 | 16 |
| Ivica Dačić – Socialist Party of Serbia (SPS) | SPS | 11 | 12 |
| Ivica Dačić – Socialist Party of Serbia (SPS) | Zeleni | 1 | 12 |
| People's Movement of Serbia – New Face of Serbia | NPS | 10 | 12 |
| People's Movement of Serbia – New Face of Serbia | NLS | 2 | 12 |
| Party of Freedom and Justice | SSP | 12 | 12 |
| New DSS and Monarchists – NADA | NDSS | 7 | 10 |
| New DSS and Monarchists – NADA | Monarchists–PKS | 3 | 10 |
| Green–Left Front – Don't Let Belgrade D(r)own | ZLF | 10 | 10 |
| Serbia Centre – SRCE | SRCE | 8 | 8 |
| We – Voice from the People | MI–GIN | 6 | 6 |
| PSG–SDA of Sandžak–PDD | PSG | 3 | 6 |
| PSG–SDA of Sandžak–PDD | SDAS | 2 | 6 |
| PSG–SDA of Sandžak–PDD | PVD/PDD | 1 | 6 |
| PUPS – Solidarity and Justice | PUPS | 6 | 6 |
| Alliance of Vojvodina Hungarians | VMSZ/SVM | 6 | 6 |
| Social Democratic Party of Serbia | SDPS | 6 | 6 |
| Dragan Marković Palma – United Serbia | JS | 5 | 5 |
| Ecological Uprising | EU | 5 | 5 |
| We – Power of the People prof dr Branimir Nestorović | MI–SN | 5 | 5 |
| Workers' Party – Russian Party – United Peasant Party | RP | 3 | 5 |
| Workers' Party – Russian Party – United Peasant Party | RS | 1 | 5 |
| Workers' Party – Russian Party – United Peasant Party | USS | 1 | 5 |
| Healthy Serbia – Movement of Socialists | ZS | 2 | 5 |
| Healthy Serbia – Movement of Socialists | PS | 2 | 5 |
| Healthy Serbia – Movement of Socialists | SNP | 1 | 5 |
| Deputies not members of parliamentary groups | SPP | 2 | 5 |
| Deputies not members of parliamentary groups | SPS | 1 | 5 |
| Deputies not members of parliamentary groups | Ind. | 2 | 5 |

== Pre-election activities ==
=== Government parties ===
Following the 2023 elections, Vučević announced that the idea of the People's Movement for the State (NPZD) would continue to be discussed for the next parliamentary election. SNS formed a joint alliance, named "Belgrade Tomorrow", in April 2024 for the June 2024 Belgrade City Assembly election; in addition to its partners, the list also included the minor government coalition members Socialist Party of Serbia (SPS) and Alliance of Vojvodina Hungarians (VMSZ), as well as the far-right Serbian Party Oathkeepers (SSZ) and Serbian Radical Party (SRS). Vučević said that with the formation of the list, NPZD was also effectively formalised. However, Vučić announced in December 2024 that NPZD would be formed in March 2025. A rally promoting the movement was held on 24 January 2025. NPZD was registered on 28 March and it opened its first offices in September 2025. In the same month, in an interview with Insajder, minister Demo Beriša suggested that NPZD could participate in the next parliamentary election.

Radoslav Milojičić, the president of the Serbian Left party, switched his affiliation to SNS in June 2024. Dragan Marković, the president of the JS and its parliamentary group, died on 22 November 2024. Igor Braunović, who was elected on the SPS list in 2023, left SPS and its parliamentary group in February 2025, citing differences on issues such as lithium mining and the anti-corruption protests.

In October 2024, Željko Veselinović and Đorđo Đorđić left the Party of Freedom and Justice (SSP) parliamentary group. They were followed by Sonja Pernat and Irena Živković on 19 November. Three days later, they formed the "Movement Sloga – Experts Should Have A Say" parliamentary group. Sloga leader Veselinović also announced the formation of the Workers' Party (RP); signatures for its registration began to be collected in December 2024. After Sloga took part in the consultations in April 2026, two MPs of the Sloga parliamentary group announced that they would leave the group once the National Assembly reconvened. Veselinović went on to form a parliamentary group with the pro-government parties RS and USS soon after. In May, the RP was registered, announcing that it would take part in the parliamentary elections. The RP later joined the SNS-led "Aleksandar Vučić – United Serbia" list.

At a gathering in June 2026, Vučić announced that the electoral list of SNS would bear the name United Serbia. Dačić announced in August that the SPS would contest the elections with its traditional partners, JS and Zeleni. Subsequently, SPS and SDPS signed a cooperation agreement, agreeing to cooperate in the parliamentary elections.

=== Opposition parties ===
SPN ceased to exist in April 2024 due to a dispute between its parties on whether to boycott the 2024 Belgrade City Assembly election. SSP, Serbia Centre (SRCE), and Together opted to boycott the election, while the rest of SPN parties took part under the We Choose Belgrade banner. A rift between the SSP and Movement of Free Citizens (PSG) occurred in the National Assembly in March 2024. The three PSG MPs decided to leave the SSP–PSG parliamentary group and continue as MPs without a parliamentary group. SSP retained its parliamentary group. In the aftermath of the acknowledgment of Vučević's resignation, former members of SPN and NADA presented a plan on the formation of a transitional government. At a press conference on 20 March, Biljana Đorđević, the co-president of the Green–Left Front, said that according to their plan, the transitional government would fulfil student demands, organise free and fair elections, and revise the voter list.

The Democratic Party (DS) elected its new president, Srđan Milivojević, on 14 December 2024. Milivojević subsequently launched a campaign on consolidating progressive parties; Together merged into DS on 27 December. The MI–GIN also suffered a split in 2024, with Branimir Nestorović and his allies forming the We – Power of the People. Initially, the party acquired 7 MPs, but lost two in July and December 2024, respectively. In March 2026, another MP, Aleksandar Pavić, left the party due to disagreements with Nestorović.

The National Democratic Alternative, led by Miloš Jovanović, announced that it would take part in the election. Jovanović suggested that three opposition lists should take part in the election: a nationalist, a pro-European, and a student list. In April 2026, Miroslav Aleksić, the president of the People's Movement of Serbia, and Miloš Parandilović, the president of the New Face of Serbia, suggested that students and opposition parties should participate on a joint electoral list.

In June 2026, SSP, SRCE, and PSG formed the Platform for a European Serbia (PES) coalition. Dragan Đilas, the president of SSP, announced that the coalition would take part in the parliamentary elections, but also said that it would cooperate with the Student List. PSG left the coalition in September, announcing that it would not take part in the elections and would support the Student List instead. SSP and SRCE were joined by Goran Ješić's Solidarity movement, and on 9 September the three announced a joint list, "European Serbia".

In August 2026, DS renamed its parliamentary group "Deputies with the Students: For Election Control"; it was joined by eight other MPs, including those of POKS, bringing it to 16 members. The group said that the places on permanent polling-station committees to which it was entitled would be put at the disposal of the Student List.

=== Students ===
Since the start of the student-led anti-corruption protests, some of the opposition parties such as DS pledged not to take part in the next parliamentary election if the movement formed an electoral list. According to Danas, other opposition parties declined to comment until the elections were officially called. Initially, the Green–Left Front (ZLF) expressed support for the student list if the elections were held in the summer of 2026. In July 2026, it announced that it would support the Student List.

The creation of a Student List was the subject of public speculation from 2025. In June 2025, a political programme was released by students, in which they presented their conditions for candidates on the Student List. The programme lists the fulfilment of protest demands as one of the goals. In November 2025, the magazine Vreme published a list of names that were allegedly proposed by the University of Novi Sad for the list. Vladan Đokić, the rector of the University of Belgrade, in an interview with the magazine Radar, said that his role in the parliamentary or presidential elections would be decided by students and the public. In September 2026, however, the faculties of the University of Belgrade reportedly vetoed him as a candidate for the Student List by 43 votes to 42.

== Electoral lists ==
The order of the lists on the ballot follows the order in which they were proclaimed. RIK adopted the final, consolidated list of 18 electoral lists on 8 October.

^{M} — National minority list

| # | Ballot name | Ballot carrier (Note: Under Article 69 of the Law on the Election of Members of Parliament, the ballot carrier (nosilac liste) is the person whose name is included in the name of the electoral list; they may, but need not, be a candidate on it.) | Main ideology | Political position | Signatures (Note: Number of legally valid statements of support, as determined by RIK.) | Note |
|---|---|---|---|---|---|---|
| 1 | Aleksandar Vučić – United Serbia; SNS, PUPS, USS, NSS, ZS, SSD, SRS, RP, BOSS, PA, PNR/VNP | Aleksandar Vučić | Populism | Big tent | 209,130 | |
| 2 | Ivica Dačić – Factor of Stability!; SPS, JS, SDPS, Zeleni | Ivica Dačić | Populism | Big tent | 18,162 | |
| 3 | Student List – Students Are Winning; SL | None (Note: Ilija Srdanović is the first candidate on the list.) | Reformism | Big tent | 69,099 | |
| 4 | Rasim Ljajić – Humane (SDP–CDP); SDP, CDP | Rasim Ljajić (Note: Rasim Ljajić is not a candidate; Dženan Palamar is the first candidate on the list.) | Bosniak minority interests; Montenegrin minority interests | | 7,675 | ^{M} |
| 5 | Alliance of Vojvodina Hungarians – Dr. Bálint Pásztor; VMSZ/SVM | Bálint Pásztor | Hungarian minority interests | Centre-right | 9,332 | ^{M} |
| 6 | Usame Zukorlić (SPP) Movement for Unification; SPP | Usame Zukorlić | Bosniak minority interests | Centre-right | 6,182 | ^{M} |
| 7 | Russian Party – Serbia into BRICS – Slobodan Nikolić; RS, NKPJ | Slobodan Nikolić | Russophilia | Right-wing | 5,101 | ^{M} |
| 8 | Authentic Right – Dr. Miloš Jovanović (New DSS – Monarchists, Serbian Coalition NADA – National Democratic Alternative – New Democratic Party of Serbia – Movement for the Kingdom of Serbia) – Boldly Serbian!; NDSS, Monarchists–PKS | Miloš Jovanović | National conservatism | Right-wing | 10,436 | |
| 9 | European Serbia – Marinika Tepić – Zdravko Ponoš (Party of Freedom and Justice, Serbia Centre – SRCE, Solidarity – Self-Defence – Liberation); SSP, SRCE, Solidarity | Marinika Tepić; Zdravko Ponoš (Note: Dragan Đilas is the first candidate on the list.) | Pro-Europeanism | | 10,020 | |
| 10 | SDA Sandžaka – Protectors of Sandžak; SDA Sandžaka | None (Note: Ahmedin Škrijelj is the first candidate on the list.) | Bosniak minority interests | Right-wing | 5,910 | ^{M} |
| 11 | Bogoljub Karić – Strength of Serbia Movement – BK; PSS | Bogoljub Karić | Conservatism | Centre-right | 10,603 | |
| 12 | Liberal-Green Party – For a Free and Cleaner Serbia; LZS | None (Note: Dejan Žujović is the first candidate on the list.) | Green liberalism | Centre-left | 10,580 | |
| 13 | I choose Justice, I choose the Future – Coalition Force, Prof. Dr. Ferid Bulić – Vasilios Provelegios, Party of Future and Development, Civic Party of Greece of Serbia; ZZBR, PKTTS/GSGS | Ferid Bulić; Vasilios Provelegios | Minority interests | | 5,069 | ^{M} |
| 14 | Russian–Serbian Unity Party, Russians and Serbs Brothers Forever; SRSJ | None (Note: Rade Savić is the first candidate on the list.) | Russophilia | Right-wing | 5,778 | ^{M} |
| 15 | Pa, This is for You – Petar Đurić – Prime Minister of Serbia; ĆOZT | Petar Đurić (Note: Gordana Đurić is the first candidate on the list.) | Anti-establishment | | 10,398 (Note: RIK proclaimed the list on 26 September with 10,007 valid statements, but annulled the decision on 30 September after doubts were raised about 125 of them. After the list submitted 516 additional valid statements, RIK proclaimed it again on 2 October.) | |
| 16 | Vladimir Gajić – Alternative for Serbia – People's Party, Rebellion–True Serbia (Note: Includes both the Serbian and Russian translation of "Rebellion–True Serbia".); Narodna, BUNT | Vladimir Gajić | National conservatism | Right-wing | 12,489 | |
| 17 | Albanian Coalition; PVD/PDD, APN/AZP, PD, PDSH, LPD, LR, AL, UDSH | None (Note: Shaip Kamberi is the first candidate on the list.) | Albanian minority interests | | 5,988 | ^{M} |
| 18 | Mother Serbia – Gruda; Gruda | None (Note: Vitomir Nedeljković is the first candidate on the list.) | Minority interests (nominally) | | 5,237 | ^{M} |
| – | People's Choice – Miroslav Miki Aleksić – Miloš Parandilović – Aleksandar Jovanović Ćuta; NPS, NLS, EU | Proclaimed as No. 9 on 18 September; withdrew in support of the Student List (announced on 22 September, formalised on 24 September) | | | | |

== Campaign ==
Critics of Vučić have alleged that his government orchestrated violence against political opponents, as well as accusing him of rampant corruption, ties with organised crime, and stifling media freedoms. Vučić has also faced pressure from the European Union over the government's handling of the funeral of the convicted war criminal Ratko Mladić, who was buried in Serbia. Pavle Kosić of Euractiv wrote that the campaign was likely to become not only a referendum on Vučić's rule, but also a test of Serbia's political direction and its increasingly strained relationship with the European Union. The government has claimed that the student movement is funded by Western powers to destabilise the country and that it is part of a colour revolution.

Key issues during the campaign have included government accountability, corruption, education, healthcare, environment, and rule of law, according to Balkan Insight.

The Bureau for Social Research (BIRODI) monitored the campaign on six television channels, RTS 1, Pink, Prva, Happy, B92, and N1.

=== Debates ===
In addition to debates on N1, Nova, Insajder, and Radio Belgrade, RTS organised three "Reč na reč" debates together with CeSID on 19, 21, and 22 October, each with six invited lists. No debate between Vučić and Srdanović took place: Srdanović turned down Vučić's challenge to a televised debate, as well as an invitation from RTS for the two to debate on 29 September or 1 October.

2026 Serbian parliamentary election
| Date | Time | Organisers | P Present N Non-invitee D Declined or absent — List not proclaimed | | | | | | | | | | | | | | | | | | |
| Date | Time | Organisers | SNS | SPS | SL | SDP–CDP | VMSZ/SVM | SPP | RS | NADA | PES | SDAS | PSS | LZS | ZZBR–GSGS | SRSJ | PTIFY | AzS | AK | Gruda | Refs |
|---|---|---|---|---|---|---|---|---|---|---|---|---|---|---|---|---|---|---|---|---|---|
| 24 Sep | 8:00 pm | N1 | P Ana Brnabić | N | P Mirjana Nikolić | N | N | N | N | N | N | N | — | — | — | — | — | — | — | — | |
| 24 Sep | 9:00 pm | Insajder | P Marina Raguš | P Dunja Simonović Bratić | P Dušan Veljković | N | N | N | N | N | P Jasna Matić | N | — | — | — | — | — | — | — | — | |
| 29 Sep | 10:00 pm | RTS | P Marina Raguš | P Snežana Paunović | N | N | N | N | N | N | P Zdravko Ponoš | N | N | — | — | — | N | — | — | — | |
| 30 Sep | 8:30 pm | Insajder | N | N | P Svetlana Stanarević | N | N | N | N | P Miloš Stanković | P Slobodan Cvejić | N | N | — | — | — | N | — | — | — | |
| 1 Oct | 8:00 pm | N1 | P Siniša Mali | P Dušan Bajatović | D | N | N | N | N | N | P Dušan Nikezić | N | N | — | — | — | — | — | — | — | |
| 2 Oct | 8:30 pm | Nova | P Ana Brnabić | P Dunja Simonović Bratić | P Vladan Kuzmanović | N | N | N | N | N | P Marinika Tepić | N | N | N | N | N | — | — | — | — | |
| 6 Oct | 5:00 pm | Radio Belgrade | P Vladimir Đukanović | P Snežana Paunović | P Jovo Bakić | N | N | N | N | P Miloš Jovanović | N | N | N | N | N | N | N | N | N | N | |
| 7 Oct | 8:30 pm | Insajder | P Milenko Jovanov | N | N | N | P Elvira Kovács | N | N | P Predrag Marsenić | P Mihailo Brkić | N | N | N | N | N | N | N | N | N | |
| 8 Oct | 8:00 pm | N1 | P Zlatibor Lončar | P Vladimir Đukić | P Miroslav Andrić | N | N | N | N | N | P Dragan Delić | N | N | N | N | N | N | N | N | N | |
| 8 Oct | 10:00 pm | RTS | P Siniša Mali | N | P Dejan Šoškić | N | N | N | N | P Miloš Jovanović | P Dušan Nikezić | N | N | N | N | N | N | N | N | N | |
| 9 Oct | 8:30 pm | Nova | P Zlatan Elek (Note: As the president of Serb list.) | P Aleksandra Pavlović | P Jugoslav Gašić | N | N | N | N | N | P Dragan Delić | N | N | N | N | N | N | N | N | N | |
| 12 Oct | 5:00 pm | Radio Belgrade | P Milenko Jovanov | N | N | N | N | N | N | N | P Vladimir Obradović | N | N | N | N | N | N | N | N | N | |
| 13 Oct | 9:20 pm | RTS | P Ana Brnabić | P Dunja Simonović Bratić | P Aleksandar Baucal | N | N | N | N | N | P Marinika Tepić | N | N | N | N | N | N | N | N | N | |
| 14 Oct | 8:30 pm | Insajder | P Siniša Mali | P Uglješa Marković | P Miljan Salata | N | N | N | N | N | P Vladimir Obradović | N | N | N | N | N | N | N | N | N | |
| 15 Oct | 5:00 pm | Radio Belgrade | N | P Uglješa Marković | N | N | N | N | N | P Predrag Marsenić | N | N | N | N | N | N | N | N | N | N | |
| 15 Oct | 8:00 pm | N1 | P Marina Raguš | N | P Ivana Petrović | N | N | N | N | P Miloš Stanković | P Slobodan Cvejić | N | N | N | N | N | N | N | N | N | |
| 16 Oct | 8:30 pm | Nova | P Siniša Mali | P Dušan Bajatović | P Jugoslav Ristić | N | N | N | N | N | P Dragan Đilas | N | N | N | N | N | N | N | N | N | |
| 19 Oct | 7:25 pm | Radio Belgrade | P Vladimir Đukanović | P Veljko Odalović | P Jugoslav Gašić | N | N | N | N | N | P Mihailo Brkić | N | N | N | N | N | N | N | N | N | |
| 19 Oct | 10:00 pm | RTS | N | N | N | P Muamer Bačevac | N | P Edin Numanović | P Slobodan Nikolić | N | N | D (Note: Invited, but did not take part.) | N | N | P Ferid Bulić | N | N | N | D | P Suzana Lazarević | |
| 20 Oct | 5:00 pm | Radio Belgrade | N | N | N | N | N | N | N | N | N | N | P Bogoljub Karić | P Dejan Žujović | N | P Stefan Maljković | P Milan Vukelić | P Vladimir Gajić | N | N | |
| 20 Oct | 11:00 pm | RTS | P Marina Raguš | P Đorđe Milićević | P Nemanja Karović | N | N | N | N | P Miloš Jovanović | N | N | N | N | N | N | N | N | N | N | |
| 21 Oct | 7:22 pm | Radio Belgrade | P Milenko Jovanov | P Uglješa Marković | P Aleksandar Čupić | N | N | N | N | N | N | N | N | N | N | N | N | N | N | N | |
| 21 Oct | 10:00 pm | RTS | P Ana Brnabić | P Ivica Dačić | P Vladan Kuzmanović | N | P Elvira Kovács | N | N | P Miloš Jovanović | P Dragan Đilas | N | N | N | N | N | N | N | N | N | |
| 22 Oct | 10:00 pm | RTS | N | N | N | N | N | N | D | N | N | N | P Bogoljub Karić | P Zoran Kojadinović | N | P Tanja Arsić | P Petar Đurić | P Dušan Žugić | N | N | |

=== Party campaigns ===
==== Government ====
SNS submitted its electoral list on 12 September; RIK proclaimed it a day later. Vučić is the ballot carrier and is followed on the list by Vučević and Brnabić. The list also includes non-SNS members, such as Aleksandar Šešelj and Vjerica Radeta from SRS, as well as the government-aligned former student Miloš Pavlović, and actress Lidija Vukićević. During the campaign, Vučević visited several towns, saying that the SNS electoral list "fights for a free, decent, and safe Serbia" (se bori za slobodnu, pristojnu i sigurnu Srbiju). SNS also said that it would campaign on the standard of living in Serbia.

SPS submitted its electoral list on the same day as SNS. The list consists of SPS, JS, Zeleni, and SDPS. Dačić is its ballot carrier. RIK proclaimed the list on 14 September. Besides Dačić, other candidates on the list include Dalibor Marković, the son of the late Dragan Marković, Dušan Bajatović, Vladan Zagrađanin, Snežana Paunović, Aleksandar Antić, and Slavica Đukić Dejanović. Dačić said that his coalition would tour Serbia and fight for national interests, as well as the interests of the people.

The Strength of Serbia Movement, led by Bogoljub Karić, submitted its electoral list on 23 September.

Vučić headed the "Aleksandar Vučić – United Serbia" list, as its ballot carrier and first candidate, while still serving as president; he had announced in June 2026 that he would resign, but remained in office during the first weeks of the campaign. Critics, including the retired law professor Vesna Rakić Vodinelić, argued that this gave the ruling coalition an unjustified advantage, and the NGO BIRODI asked the Anti-Corruption Agency to respond. On 16 September, RIK rejected four complaints, including one filed by BIRODI director Zoran Gavrilović, which argued that the list should not have been proclaimed because it bore the name of the sitting president; 17 of the 20 members present voted against the complaints. RIK member Sofija Mandić said that RIK should have sought the opinion of the Anti-Corruption Agency, while RIK president Vladimir Dimitrijević said that no EU country except Croatia barred such a candidacy. Vučić said that the law did not require him to resign, but that he did not want to campaign for prime minister while president, and that he would tour Serbia as an "ordinary citizen". He scheduled his resignation for after his return from the United Nations General Assembly in New York, where he gave what he described as his last speech at the UN as president, and confirmed from New York on 24 September that he would resign on 27 September. He submitted his resignation on 27 September, and Brnabić became acting president for a period of up to three months, during which a presidential election has to be held. Brnabić said that she would call the presidential election "when the time comes, in accordance with the Constitution"; it must be held by 27 December 2026. In October, N1 refused to let Vučić present the "Aleksandar Vučić – United Serbia" list in its pre-election programme and asked SNS to nominate another representative, which government officials described as a "fascist decision".

The "Aleksandar Vučić – United Serbia" list held its final rally at the Hala sportova in Belgrade on 22 October, where Vučić promised that the average wage would reach €1,500 within four years, while SPS closed its campaign in Surdulica.

==== Opposition ====
NADA submitted its electoral list on 18 September under the name "Authentic Right", with Jovanović as its ballot carrier. In a press conference, Jovanović said that the coalition supported cooperation with the European Union, but opposed Serbia's membership in it. Jovanović also said that SNS voters had signed in support of NADA's electoral list. Aleksandar Pavić, a member of parliament formerly affiliated with MI–SN, is a candidate on the NADA electoral list. The coalition received support from the academics Kosta Čavoški and Matija Bećković, as well as the political analyst Dragomir Anđelković and historian Bojan Dimitrijević. RIK proclaimed the list the same day. During the campaign, Jovanović said that NADA opposed the legalisation of same-sex marriage, while supporting a referendum on membership of Serbia in the European Union. Predrag Marsenić of NDSS said that, if it crossed the electoral threshold, the coalition would join a government led by the Student List.

PES submitted its electoral list on 19 September under the name "European Serbia". Several SSP officials refused to appear on the list: Peđa Mitrović and Mila Popović withdrew before it was submitted, and vice-presidents Borko Stefanović and Goran Petrović, as well as Jelena Milošević and Vladimir Vrsajkov, the heads of the party's boards in Niš and Novi Sad, withdrew their names and endorsed the Student List. Two members of the SRCE presidency, vice-president Slobodan Petrović and Boško Šindić, left the party in protest of its participation in the elections, while the party's Užice board resigned almost in its entirety, and the leadership of its Leskovac board stepped down. Several city boards of SRCE had insisted that the party should support the Student List instead, but Zdravko Ponoš, the party's leader, refused. Ponoš said that the National Assembly would lose a pro-European voice without its participation. RIK proclaimed the list on 20 September. Đilas is first on the list, while Marinika Tepić and Ponoš are its ballot carriers. Other candidates include Tatjana Pašić, Slobodan Cvejić, Vladimir Obradović, and former minister Jasna Matić. Goran Ješić is 186th on the list. Tepić said that the coalition would campaign on issues related to the European Union. On 24 September, Đilas, Ponoš, Tepić, and Ješić signed a declaration pledging to remove the SNS from power and ruling out any post-election cooperation with it.

==== Student List ====
A recreation of Pobednik during a Student List rally

On 9 September, the Student List was officially formalised as a citizens' group (grupa građana). It held its first campaign event a day later in Novi Sad, where it presented some of its candidates; it began collecting signatures on 11 September. The Student List said that it would campaign on issues related to education, healthcare, judiciary, crime and corruption, and equality. During the campaign, the Student List reported that three associations with names similar to its own had been registered in the Business Registry Agency. The Student List was submitted to RIK on 14 September; it is headed by Ilija Srdanović. Other candidates include former basketball player and EuroLeague president Dejan Bodiroga, economist Dejan Šoškić, and sociologist Jovo Bakić. RIK proclaimed the list on 15 September as number 3 on the ballot. The Student List was endorsed by DS, ZLF, PSG, POKS, SPO, NPS, NLS, EU, Kreni-Promeni, Social Democratic Party, League of Social Democrats of Vojvodina, Dveri, and Enough is Enough, as well as by various local associations from Serbia and Kosovo. It was also backed by several minority parties, including the Montenegrin Party, the Democratic Community of Vojvodina Hungarians, and the Macedonian Party of Serbia, as well as by Love, Faith, Hope and ProGlas.

The Student List presented its election programme between 15 and 19 September. The programme consists of 11 points, covering judiciary, lustration, transparency, media capture, departisation, education, housing, and healthcare. The programme calls for an independent judiciary and prosecution service, free media, and government transparency. European Union accession is not central to the programme. Between 17 and 26 September, students took part in two bicycle tours across Serbia, the first through Vojvodina and Central Serbia, and the second through Central, Western, and Southern Serbia. During and after the tours, the Student List organised gatherings of various sizes to promote its programme and candidates. It held its final rally at Slavija Square on 22 October, which was attended by around 150,000 people according to the Archive of Public Gatherings.

==== Minority lists ====
The Sandžak Democratic Party (SDP) and Montenegrin Democratic Party (CDP) submitted a joint electoral list on 14 September. A day later, VMSZ submitted its electoral list, with Bálint Pásztor as its ballot carrier. RIK proclaimed both lists on 15 September. In an interview with the FoNet news agency, Rasim Ljajić said that he was not a candidate on the SDP–CDP list and that it bore his name only for better visibility. He is, however, its ballot carrier. SPP submitted its electoral list on 16 September. RIK proclaimed the electoral lists of SPP and RS on 17 September. The Party of Democratic Action of Sandžak (SDA Sandžaka) submitted its electoral list on 20 September. RIK proclaimed it a day later. Zukorlić's SPP list closed its campaign with a rally in Novi Pazar on 22 October.

==== Withdrawn lists ====
NPS, NLS, and EU signed a coalition agreement on 10 September, forming the People's Serbia coalition, which was to run under the name "People's Choice". However, on 15 September, NLS and EU announced their withdrawal, supporting the Student List. Later that day, the coalition held a press conference at which it announced that it had submitted the list but would withdraw it and endorse the Student List. RIK proclaimed the list on 18 September as number 9 on the ballot. The coalition announced its withdrawal on 22 September, and RIK formally confirmed it on 24 September, after which the lists below it moved up one place.

=== Incidents, allegations and negative campaigning ===
==== Negative campaigning ====
SNS opened its campaign in mid-September by placing a black container in Kragujevac, in which it showcased alleged violence by the student movement. At an SNS rally in Novi Sad on 16 October, Vučić spoke of an alleged threat of the secession of Vojvodina.

Srdanović was the main target of the negative campaign conducted by United Serbia and pro-government media. Much of it centred on a vulgar social media comment about RTS presenter Vesna Radosavljević attributed to him, which was widely condemned. Pro-government tabloids alleged that he supported Montenegrin independence and had close ties to the former Montenegrin leader Milo Đukanović, portrayed him as violent, and linked him to unspecified criminal and political circles in Montenegro. According to the fact-checkers Istinomer, Raskrikavanje and Fake News Tragač, tabloids used artificial intelligence to manipulate photographs of him, and in October Informer published a forged land register extract claiming that he owned a house in Croatia.

Violence against women became a central theme of United Serbia's attacks on the Student List, and the claims about Srdanović were used throughout the campaign to portray him as a "perpetrator of violence against women". In September, government officials described a video published by students of the Faculty of Dramatic Arts as a direct threat to Vučić, claiming that it alluded to him being abused in prison. On 21 September, Brnabić held a press conference at which she said that the Student List's campaign was "unprecedented in its intimidation of women", and on the same day Darko Glišić, the president of the SNS executive board, described the Student List as "a bunch of woman-haters" (skup mrzitelja žena). SNS officials also described social media posts using the word "Ćacika" as calls for sexual violence against female SNS supporters, while the author of one such video said that the word was a term of endearment that did not refer to women. Non-governmental organisations, opposition politicians and independent media rejected the accusations, describing them as a distortion of facts and an attempt to divert attention from other issues.

==== Violent incidents ====
Numerous attacks on Student List activists and members of the public by activists of the United Serbia list were reported during the campaign, including in Belgrade, Niš, Kruševac and Grocka; according to Danas, an SNS activist in Belgrade attacked a child for showing the three-finger salute. Attacks on United Serbia activists by Student List supporters were also reported, including in Niš, where a suspect was arrested, and in Valjevo. On several occasions, United Serbia activists set up stands at locations where the Student List had announced gatherings, which led to scuffles and to the police separating the two groups; at Konjarnik in Belgrade, SNS supporters rushed at a Student List supporter who had taken an SNS flag, some of them carrying telescopic batons. In Republika Srpska, students taking part in a cycling tour were involved in an incident in Višegrad and were charged by the police in Brčko with breaching the law on public gatherings, after which they cancelled a planned visit to Banja Luka.

Tatjana Mićić, a Kreni-Promeni councillor in Belgrade, said that she had been assaulted by the mayor, Aleksandar Šapić, in Bežanijska kosa on the night of 28 September, after a verbal altercation that began when she and her husband ran into Šapić while out walking. Šapić denied hitting her, saying that he had only pushed her away while defending himself from her husband. Kreni-Promeni published footage of the incident and medical reports which it said showed fractures of Mićić's jaw and nose, and its lawyer accused the Ministry of Internal Affairs and the Emergency Centre of obstruction for not submitting their reports to the prosecution. The Third Basic Public Prosecutor's Office opened a case against Šapić on suspicion of grievous bodily harm and violent behaviour. Kreni-Promeni also claimed that Šapić had been carrying two pistols; the prosecution stated that he had not had them on him and that he had voluntarily handed over his legally owned firearms at his residence after being questioned.

The following day, 29 September, a fight broke out near the Futoška market in Novi Sad after SNS activists tried to seize a "Students Are Winning" banner from Student List supporters. United Serbia activist Ljiljana Cvjetković was punched in the head during the clash, which SNS officials, including Vučević, cited as an example of violence against women by the list's opponents. Cvjetković and Vučević accused Srdanović of having led the attack, while a member of the local citizens' assembly said that Srdanović had arrived towards the end and called on people to disperse. Footage published several days later showed Cvjetković kicking a person during a clash some days prior to the incident, after which independent media accused her of presenting herself as a victim.

==== Abuse of public resources and other allegations ====
The government was repeatedly accused of using public resources in the campaign. According to Danas, the United Serbia list ran a call centre on two floors of the headquarters of Lasta, a transport company that receives funding from the Belgrade city budget. In an interview with BIRN, former SNS activist Momčilo Marjanović said that he had organised groups of enforcers at Ćacilend in coordination with the police, that he had seen around a hundred armed people there during the 15 for 15 protest, and that he had organised vote-buying and pressure on voters with money from Toplana, the Novi Sad public heating company, whose director Nenad Barac had allegedly paid him over €400,000 in cash over two years. He also alleged that public companies employed people in "phantom" jobs to campaign for the party or to attack its opponents. Barac denied the allegations and asked the prosecution to react, and the Prosecutor's Office for Organised Crime launched preliminary inquiries. Data leaked from the Progress.rs platform led to reports that the SNS social media campaign relied on accounts of employees of 231 public institutions, who posted party material during working hours, mainly on X. On 22 October, the police searched the home of a computer science student suspected of having published the list of these accounts. Nova and CRTA also published testimonies of employees of public enterprises and institutions who said that they had been pressured to sign in support of the United Serbia list, collect signatures, campaign or provide "guaranteed votes", under threat of dismissal, disciplinary proceedings or transfer to lower positions.

On 15 October, The Guardian reported that Vučić had been personally involved in the General Staff buildings affair, an attempt to unlawfully revoke the cultural heritage status of the General Staff buildings in Belgrade so that they could be replaced with a Trump Organization hotel, and that he had pressured officials to remove the designation. The attempt had led to criminal proceedings against four people, including the culture minister Nikola Selaković.

==== Warnings of post-election unrest ====
Several opposition figures and commentators called on citizens to take to the streets after the election to "defend the Student List's victory", accusing the authorities of planning to manipulate the results. Vučić, in turn, claimed that "some from outside and some from inside" would try to provoke unrest on election night. The election was frequently compared to the overthrow of Slobodan Milošević on 5 October 2000, which followed an attempt to overturn the results of the 2000 presidential election; Dačić called on voters not to allow "a new 5 October", describing it as a fraud.

== Opinion polls ==
Opinion polling for Serbian parliamentary elections has been conducted by various monitoring and research organisations such as Faktor Plus, Ipsos, and Nova srpska politička misao. Since the rise of the student movement, the race has tightened between the SNS and SL, with some putting SNS first, while others have put SL first.

=== Graphical summary ===
The graph below showcases major parties and alliances in opinion polls from the 2023 parliamentary election to the present day.

Local regression chart of poll results from 17 December 2023 to the present day

== Conduct ==
According to RIK, 6,451,292 voters were registered for the election, with voting taking place at 8,392 polling stations, including 93 abroad in 37 countries, 29 in prisons, and 60 in Raška, Tutin, Vranje, and Kuršumlija for voters from Kosovo. Voting was repeated at 53 polling stations in 24 municipalities on 1 November.

The Organization for Security and Co-operation in Europe announced that its Office for Democratic Institutions and Human Rights (ODIHR) would observe the election. Its mission was led by Eoghan Murphy and consisted of 14 core team members and 30 long-term observers, with 300 short-term observers requested for election day. In its interim report, ODIHR stated that the campaign was marked by deep political polarisation, reports of intimidation of activists, tensions and isolated incidents of violence, and concerns over the misuse of public resources, including a one-off payment of almost €1 billion to adult citizens. Vladimir Dimitrijević, the president of RIK, announced that the Centre for Free Elections and Democracy (CeSID) would also monitor the election.

In its report on the campaign, the CRTA recorded 116 incidents with elements of physical violence and found that ruling-party actors received almost three quarters of the airtime on national television channels, while the Student List was portrayed negatively for over 80% of its airtime; it also suspected seven of the 18 electoral lists of being "phantom" lists. Brnabić accused CRTA of being "an active participant in this campaign, not an objective observer".

The election silence began at midnight on 23 October and lasted until the polling stations closed at 20:00 on 25 October. On 23 October, the Regulatory Authority for Electronic Media (REM) stated that it had observed content in the morning programmes of N1 and Nova S that was contrary to the rules on election silence. Slobodan Georgiev, the news director of Nova S, denied that the channel had broken the silence, saying that REM had first given the material to Informer and only sent its notice three hours later, while REM council member Rodoljub Šabić said that the notice had never been adopted by the REM Council and that none of its four independent members had seen it.

Polling stations opened at 07:00 on 25 October. Turnout was considerably higher than in 2023 throughout the day; according to RIK, it was 34.55% at 12:00, compared with 21.33% at the same time in 2023, and 64.89% at 18:00, compared with 51.93%.

CeSID reported more than 120 irregularities by 11:00, including breaches of the secrecy of the vote, conflicts at polling stations and obstruction of observers. During the day, the Student List and Kreni-Promeni reported suspected vote buying and parallel voter lists in several towns, including Niš, Kragujevac, Novi Sad and Zaječar. Two journalists were physically attacked in Pavlovac near Vranje, after which two people were arrested, while in Leskovac two people were detained after a clash between members of a polling board in which a ballot box was damaged.

At the repeat vote on 1 November, CRTA again reported irregularities, including vote-buying in favour of the "Usame Zukorlić – Movement for Unification" list, which won a seat as a result of the repeat vote.

In a joint preliminary statement on 26 October, the observation missions of ODIHR, the Parliamentary Assembly of the Council of Europe and the European Parliament said that turnout was high and the two main contenders competed strongly, but that the election took place in a "deeply polarized atmosphere, with serious inequalities in campaign conditions", in which "the ruling party benefited from entrenched advantages, including the misuse of public resources". They assessed election day positively at most observed polling stations, but raised concerns over physical violence against polling staff, citizen observers and journalists, over politically influenced decisions affecting the impartiality of RIK, and over broadcasters' bias in favour of United Serbia.

== Results ==
On election night, the CeSID–Ipsos projection gave the Student List 52% of the vote and United Serbia 39.3%, with "Ivica Dačić – Factor of Stability!" below the threshold at 2.3%; their final projection, based on their full sample but excluding polling stations abroad, gave the Student List 141 seats and United Serbia 103. The Student List led in RIK's count once more polling stations had been processed. On 26 October, RIK adopted preliminary results based on 8,187 polling stations, which gave the Student List 140 seats and United Serbia 104, the Alliance of Vojvodina Hungarians and the Albanian Coalition two seats each, and the Ljudski and SDA Sandžaka lists one seat each. Once the votes cast abroad, where the Student List won around two-thirds of the vote, had been processed, the Student List rose to 141 seats and United Serbia fell to 103.

RIK ordered voting to be repeated on 1 November at 53 polling stations, at 31 of which the results could not be determined and at 22 of which voting had been annulled. After the repeat vote, the "Usame Zukorlić – Movement for Unification" list, which as a national minority list is exempt from the threshold, won one seat at the expense of the Student List. RIK adopted its final report on 5 November, confirming that the Student List had won 140 seats and United Serbia 103, with the Alliance of Vojvodina Hungarians and the Albanian Coalition winning two seats each, and the Ljudski, SDA Sandžaka and Movement for Unification lists one seat each. Of the 6,451,292 registered voters, 4,444,310 turned out (68.89%), and 56,571 of the 4,441,636 ballots cast were invalid. The announcement of the final results started the 30-day period for the constitutive sitting of the new National Assembly, and RIK is to issue decisions allocating seats to individual candidates within ten days.

Diagram of the National Assembly
| Electoral list | Votes | % | Seats | +/– |
|---|---|---|---|---|
| Student List | 2,354,417 | 53.69 | 140 | New |
| Aleksandar Vučić – United Serbia | 1,731,323 | 39.48 | 103 | –26 |
| Ivica Dačić – Factor of Stability! | 94,766 | 2.16 | 0 | –18 |
| Authentic Right | 39,503 | 0.90 | 0 | –13 |
| Alliance of Vojvodina Hungarians | 35,461 | 0.81 | 2 | –4 |
| Albanian Coalition | 27,683 | 0.63 | 2 | +1 |
| Ljudski (SDP–CDP) | 20,638 | 0.47 | 1 | New |
| Strength of Serbia Movement | 20,045 | 0.46 | 0 | 0 |
| SDA Sandžaka | 12,596 | 0.29 | 1 | –1 |
| European Serbia | 12,570 | 0.29 | 0 | –20 |
| Movement for Unification | 12,440 | 0.28 | 1 | –1 |
| Russian Party | 6,503 | 0.15 | 0 | –1 |
| Russian–Serbian Unity Party | 4,286 | 0.10 | 0 | New |
| Alternative for Serbia | 3,705 | 0.08 | 0 | 0 |
| Mother Serbia – Gruda | 3,234 | 0.07 | 0 | New |
| Liberal-Green Party | 2,686 | 0.06 | 0 | New |
| Pa, This is for You | 2,022 | 0.05 | 0 | New |
| Force Coalition | 1,187 | 0.03 | 0 | 0 |
| Total | 4,385,065 | 100.00 | 250 | 0 |
| Valid votes | 4,385,065 | 98.73 | | |
| Invalid/blank votes | 56,571 | 1.27 | | |
| Total votes | 4,441,636 | 100.00 | | |
| Registered voters/turnout | 6,451,292 | 68.85 | | |
Source: Republic Electoral Commission

=== Results by statistical region ===
The Student List prevailed in three statistical regions, flipping Belgrade, Vojvodina, as well Šumadija and Western Serbia away from the United Serbia: (Note: The party ran as 'Serbia Must Not Stop' in 2023) it did best in the capital region with 62.9% of the vote. The bloc earned slimmer majorities in Vojvodina with 51.2% of the vote, as well as in Šumadija and Western Serbia, where it secured 50.1% of the vote. Conversely, the United Serbia narrowly won Southern and Eastern Serbia with 45.8% of the vote, while performing strongly in Kosovo and Metohija.

| Region | US | FS | SL | Lj. | VMSZ | SPP | Ru. | AD | ES | SDAS | PSS | LZS | Bi. | Ru. | Ća. | Al. | KShLP | Gr. |
|---|---|---|---|---|---|---|---|---|---|---|---|---|---|---|---|---|---|---|
| Belgrade | 31.65 | 1.47 | 62.94 | 0.10 | 0.03 | 0.03 | 0.14 | 1.23 | 0.43 | 0.01 | 0.49 | 0.08 | 0.02 | 0.11 | 0.05 | 0.13 | 0.01 | 0.07 |
| Vojvodina | 39.54 | 1.65 | 52.21 | 0.08 | 3.01 | 0.03 | 0.28 | 0.81 | 0.03 | 0.17 | 0.40 | 0.06 | 0.02 | 0.11 | 0.05 | 0.07 | 0.01 | 0.06 |
| Šumadija and Western Serbia | 39.94 | 2.61 | 50.78 | 1.49 | 0.03 | 0.77 | 0.15 | 0.81 | 1.03 | 0.43 | 0.20 | 0.04 | 0.04 | 0.09 | 0.04 | 0.07 | 0.01 | 0.08 |
| Southern and Eastern Serbia | 45.83 | 3.06 | 44.39 | 0.20 | 0.03 | 0.26 | 0.14 | 0.13 | 0.70 | 0.01 | 0.53 | 0.06 | 0.03 | 0.09 | 0.05 | 0.07 | 3.04 | 0.08 |
| Kosovo and Metohija | 71.97 | 3.28 | 20.62 | 0.04 | 0.01 | 0.03 | 0.10 | 1.01 | 0.04 | 0.03 | 0.28 | 0.02 | 0.01 | 0.06 | 0.02 | 0.03 | 0.01 | 0.02 |
| Prisons | 64.93 | 2.46 | 24.52 | 0.13 | 0.24 | 0.19 | 0.55 | 1.27 | 0.11 | 0.48 | 1.23 | 0.09 | 0.09 | 0.45 | 0.29 | 0.09 | 0.41 | 0.24 |
| Abroad | 24.83 | 0.49 | 72.57 | 0.04 | 0.02 | 0.02 | 0.04 | 0.53 | 0.35 | 0.04 | 0.49 | 0.10 | – | 0.03 | 0.01 | 0.04 | 0.01 | 0.02 |

=== Results by municipality ===
The Student List performed strongly in all seventeen municipalities of Belgrade, recording their strongest nationwide result in Stari Grad. It also secured Novi Sad and Niš, the country's second- and third-largest cities. In the latter case, the Student List also secured all the municipalities in the city, performing best in Medijana. (Note: Unlike Belgrade and Niš, Novi Sad is not divided into municipalities) United Serbia performed the strongest in southern municipalities of Novo Brdo, Obilić, Gnjilane and Gora and Trgovište; (Note: Novo Brdo, Obilić, Gnjilane and Gora are located in Kosovo; their names are given according to Law on Territorial Organization of the Republic of Serbia); overall, it won 95 municipalities to the Student List's 91. However, the latter won 26 out of 29 cities; in contrast, United Serbia prevailed in the southern cities of Leskovac, Prokuplje and Vranje. Ivica Dačić's Factor of Stability finished in a distant third, performing best in Peć: it was the only municipality the list won.

The Alliance of Vojvodina Hungarians won in Kanjiža, but ceded ground in Senta, Ada and Bačka Topola, where they won in 2023. Similarly, the Bosniak-minority Justice and Reconciliation Party (SPP) fell in Sjenica, which flipped to the United Serbia; nonetheless, Tutin remained in the hands of Party of Democratic Action of Sandžak (SDAS), although its support slipped beneath the majority of the votes. Humane, the third Bosniak-minority list, recorded its strongest result in Novi Pazar; however, all three minority parties there combined for less votes than the Student List. Novi Pazar was also the municipality to see one of the strongest swings away from the Serbian Progressive Party.

| Municipality | US | FS | SL | Lj. | VMSZ | SPP | Ru. | AD | ES | SDAS | PSS | LZS | Bi. | Ru. | Ća. | Al. | KShLP | Gr. |
|---|---|---|---|---|---|---|---|---|---|---|---|---|---|---|---|---|---|---|
| Ada | 35.51 | 2.02 | 30.80 | 0.05 | 27.83 | 0.05 | 0.10 | 0.36 | 0.19 | 0.04 | 0.19 | 0.06 | 0.02 | 0.05 | 0.07 | 0.00 | 0.02 | 0.05 |
| Aleksandrovac | 43.94 | 4.32 | 48.09 | 0.17 | 0.03 | 0.06 | 0.18 | 0.66 | 0.20 | 0.01 | 0.54 | 0.05 | 0.01 | 0.12 | 0.04 | 0.06 | 0.00 | 0.05 |
| Aleksinac | 50.30 | 2.94 | 42.50 | 0.09 | 0.03 | 0.30 | 0.19 | 0.89 | 0.19 | 0.00 | 0.56 | 0.28 | 0.02 | 0.11 | 0.03 | 0.08 | 0.01 | 0.11 |
| Alibunar | 44.76 | 1.56 | 49.24 | 0.29 | 0.14 | 0.03 | 0.18 | 0.41 | 1.10 | 0.08 | 0.32 | 0.04 | 0.03 | 0.06 | 0.02 | 0.05 | 0.00 | 0.06 |
| Apatin | 47.12 | 2.16 | 44.10 | 0.08 | 3.43 | 0.02 | 0.26 | 0.56 | 0.15 | 0.06 | 0.29 | 0.05 | 0.02 | 0.09 | 0.08 | 0.05 | 0.01 | 0.08 |
| Aranđelovac | 42.49 | 2.41 | 51.98 | 0.09 | 0.03 | 0.03 | 0.12 | 0.70 | 0.14 | 0.01 | 0.48 | 0.05 | 0.01 | 0.08 | 0.04 | 0.05 | 0.00 | 0.11 |
| Arilje | 38.15 | 2.00 | 56.26 | 0.15 | 0.02 | 0.05 | 0.09 | 1.06 | 0.09 | 0.02 | 0.51 | 0.03 | 0.01 | 0.11 | 0.02 | 0.11 | 0.00 | 0.15 |
| Babušnica | 54.33 | 3.27 | 38.86 | 0.12 | 0.05 | 0.19 | 0.41 | 0.39 | 0.29 | 0.03 | 0.56 | 0.00 | 0.05 | 0.05 | 0.08 | 0.05 | 0.00 | 0.12 |
| Bač | 49.07 | 1.55 | 45.96 | 0.25 | 0.26 | 0.03 | 0.05 | 0.39 | 0.13 | 0.05 | 0.48 | 0.05 | 0.06 | 0.08 | 0.05 | 0.01 | 0.00 | 0.05 |
| Bačka Palanka | 43.10 | 1.97 | 51.27 | 0.07 | 0.21 | 0.02 | 0.18 | 0.70 | 0.22 | 0.03 | 0.50 | 0.07 | 0.02 | 0.17 | 0.03 | 0.06 | 0.00 | 0.08 |
| Bačka Topola | 34.70 | 1.04 | 34.27 | 0.05 | 25.64 | 0.05 | 0.14 | 0.53 | 0.14 | 0.04 | 0.24 | 0.04 | 0.03 | 0.08 | 0.05 | 0.05 | 0.02 | 0.05 |
| Bački Petrovac | 35.65 | 1.01 | 59.89 | 0.07 | 0.15 | 0.01 | 0.12 | 0.55 | 0.56 | 0.01 | 0.34 | 0.06 | 0.05 | 0.07 | 0.06 | 0.00 | 0.00 | 0.04 |
| Bajina Bašta | 45.80 | 2.32 | 48.89 | 0.09 | 0.02 | 0.02 | 0.09 | 0.81 | 0.20 | 0.00 | 0.32 | 0.04 | 0.01 | 0.09 | 0.03 | 0.04 | 0.01 | 0.04 |
| Barajevo, Belgrade | 44.78 | 2.31 | 48.72 | 0.08 | 0.03 | 0.00 | 0.21 | 1.05 | 0.25 | 0.01 | 0.68 | 0.07 | 0.02 | 0.17 | 0.07 | 0.07 | 0.01 | 0.11 |
| Batočina | 46.72 | 3.30 | 45.97 | 0.34 | 0.01 | 0.03 | 0.12 | 0.94 | 0.18 | 0.00 | 0.67 | 0.03 | 0.03 | 0.04 | 0.03 | 0.04 | 0.03 | 0.12 |
| Bečej | 42.95 | 0.82 | 40.13 | 0.15 | 11.97 | 0.03 | 0.15 | 0.63 | 0.22 | 0.05 | 0.28 | 0.05 | 0.03 | 0.11 | 0.05 | 0.08 | 0.00 | 0.09 |
| Bela Crkva | 47.03 | 1.49 | 47.77 | 0.03 | 0.14 | 0.02 | 0.24 | 0.60 | 0.23 | 0.05 | 0.43 | 0.08 | 0.01 | 0.10 | 0.08 | 0.04 | 0.00 | 0.06 |
| Bela Palanka | 65.08 | 2.11 | 28.86 | 0.13 | 0.07 | 0.07 | 0.07 | 0.94 | 0.19 | 0.00 | 0.32 | 0.06 | 0.04 | 0.04 | 0.06 | 0.06 | 0.00 | 0.04 |
| Beočin | 48.80 | 4.46 | 43.26 | 0.04 | 0.15 | 0.10 | 0.16 | 0.76 | 0.16 | 0.00 | 0.47 | 0.02 | 0.01 | 0.13 | 0.06 | 0.06 | 0.02 | 0.04 |
| Blace | 51.97 | 2.55 | 40.50 | 0.18 | 0.03 | 0.03 | 0.11 | 1.80 | 0.62 | 0.02 | 0.40 | 0.03 | 0.02 | 0.13 | 0.06 | 0.10 | 0.06 | 0.16 |
| Bogatić | 43.96 | 2.22 | 50.57 | 0.11 | 0.01 | 0.02 | 0.11 | 0.74 | 0.09 | 0.02 | 0.34 | 0.03 | 0.02 | 0.04 | 0.04 | 0.04 | 0.01 | 0.06 |
| Bojnik | 70.04 | 2.06 | 25.86 | 0.06 | 0.00 | 0.15 | 0.02 | 0.26 | 0.00 | 0.02 | 0.20 | 0.02 | 0.04 | 0.06 | 0.00 | 0.04 | 0.02 | 0.04 |
| Boljevac | 51.13 | 5.23 | 40.41 | 0.06 | 0.02 | 0.03 | 0.11 | 0.46 | 0.13 | 0.02 | 0.45 | 0.06 | 0.00 | 0.05 | 0.16 | 0.22 | 0.00 | 0.03 |
| Bor | 40.63 | 2.65 | 53.86 | 0.10 | 0.01 | 0.03 | 0.13 | 0.34 | 0.30 | 0.01 | 0.58 | 0.07 | 0.04 | 0.07 | 0.05 | 0.03 | 0.01 | 0.14 |
| Bosilegrad | 62.79 | 3.61 | 29.76 | 0.24 | 0.02 | 0.07 | 0.12 | 0.14 | 0.55 | 0.05 | 0.22 | 0.02 | 0.07 | 0.07 | 0.00 | 0.00 | 0.00 | 0.02 |
| Brus | 50.15 | 2.71 | 41.89 | 0.65 | 0.06 | 0.02 | 0.10 | 1.40 | 0.18 | 0.01 | 0.20 | 0.04 | 0.00 | 0.03 | 0.02 | 0.04 | 0.02 | 0.02 |
| Bujanovac | 25.75 | 0.93 | 9.65 | 0.04 | 0.01 | 4.09 | 0.05 | 0.26 | 0.01 | 0.02 | 0.11 | 0.00 | 0.01 | 0.03 | 0.02 | 0.02 | 54.41 | 0.04 |
| Crna Trava | 71.52 | 7.04 | 17.30 | 0.00 | 0.15 | 0.00 | 0.00 | 1.38 | 0.00 | 0.00 | 0.15 | 0.00 | 0.00 | 0.00 | 0.31 | 0.00 | 0.00 | 0.46 |
| Crveni Krst, Niš | 44.74 | 1.80 | 49.57 | 0.06 | 0.01 | 0.07 | 0.22 | 0.70 | 0.09 | 0.00 | 0.58 | 0.07 | 0.05 | 0.08 | 0.08 | 0.13 | 0.01 | 0.14 |
| Čačak | 33.55 | 1.84 | 61.42 | 0.15 | 0.02 | 0.02 | 0.18 | 0.76 | 0.17 | 0.02 | 0.29 | 0.05 | 0.02 | 0.08 | 0.03 | 0.08 | 0.00 | 0.07 |
| Čajetina | 39.21 | 2.18 | 55.40 | 0.07 | 0.04 | 0.03 | 0.17 | 0.81 | 0.23 | 0.00 | 0.41 | 0.05 | 0.02 | 0.17 | 0.00 | 0.09 | 0.00 | 0.07 |
| Čoka | 44.65 | 0.84 | 36.80 | 0.04 | 14.21 | 0.04 | 0.11 | 0.46 | 0.11 | 0.02 | 0.32 | 0.04 | 0.04 | 0.07 | 0.09 | 0.04 | 0.02 | 0.09 |
| Čukarica, Belgrade | 31.04 | 1.37 | 63.60 | 0.09 | 0.03 | 0.02 | 0.14 | 1.39 | 0.37 | 0.01 | 0.50 | 0.08 | 0.02 | 0.11 | 0.05 | 0.13 | 0.01 | 0.06 |
| Ćićevac | 54.59 | 2.42 | 39.75 | 0.11 | 0.00 | 0.02 | 0.09 | 0.81 | 0.06 | 0.02 | 0.59 | 0.08 | 0.00 | 0.13 | 0.08 | 0.02 | 0.02 | 0.11 |
| Ćuprija | 48.60 | 1.36 | 46.36 | 0.10 | 0.02 | 0.01 | 0.21 | 0.73 | 0.21 | 0.01 | 0.60 | 0.09 | 0.02 | 0.08 | 0.05 | 0.05 | 0.01 | 0.14 |
| Despotovac | 56.29 | 2.50 | 37.73 | 0.11 | 0.05 | 0.06 | 0.20 | 0.49 | 0.29 | 0.02 | 0.61 | 0.04 | 0.01 | 0.07 | 0.03 | 0.04 | 0.04 | 0.06 |
| Dimitrovgrad | 45.96 | 3.75 | 46.24 | 0.12 | 0.02 | 0.07 | 0.12 | 0.23 | 0.53 | 0.07 | 0.44 | 0.04 | 0.04 | 0.12 | 0.05 | 0.02 | 0.05 | 0.18 |
| Doljevac | 67.97 | 1.55 | 25.48 | 0.05 | 0.01 | 0.05 | 0.15 | 0.46 | 0.10 | 0.01 | 0.31 | 0.02 | 0.00 | 0.07 | 0.02 | 0.02 | 0.00 | 0.06 |
| Gadžin Han | 62.28 | 5.28 | 30.03 | 0.13 | 0.03 | 0.03 | 0.10 | 0.65 | 0.05 | 0.00 | 0.30 | 0.00 | 0.00 | 0.00 | 0.05 | 0.00 | 0.00 | 0.05 |
| Gnjilane | 83.11 | 1.29 | 12.96 | 0.03 | 0.00 | 0.00 | 0.00 | 0.55 | 0.00 | 0.05 | 0.05 | 0.00 | 0.03 | 0.05 | 0.00 | 0.00 | 0.00 | 0.00 |
| Golubac | 57.39 | 3.93 | 35.08 | 0.16 | 0.00 | 0.02 | 0.14 | 0.60 | 0.19 | 0.02 | 0.54 | 0.02 | 0.02 | 0.14 | 0.08 | 0.02 | 0.00 | 0.14 |
| Gora | 81.18 | 0.70 | 12.54 | 0.35 | 0.35 | 1.05 | 0.00 | 0.00 | 0.00 | 0.00 | 0.00 | 0.00 | 0.00 | 0.00 | 0.00 | 0.00 | 0.00 | 0.00 |
| Gornji Milanovac | 35.30 | 2.05 | 59.41 | 0.16 | 0.03 | 0.02 | 0.13 | 0.92 | 0.14 | 0.00 | 0.40 | 0.06 | 0.00 | 0.18 | 0.04 | 0.05 | 0.01 | 0.08 |
| Grocka, Belgrade | 39.74 | 2.28 | 53.92 | 0.10 | 0.03 | 0.04 | 0.16 | 1.09 | 0.23 | 0.01 | 0.77 | 0.06 | 0.02 | 0.10 | 0.06 | 0.09 | 0.01 | 0.10 |
| Inđija | 46.20 | 2.05 | 47.88 | 0.07 | 0.11 | 0.03 | 0.18 | 1.00 | 0.22 | 0.04 | 0.59 | 0.06 | 0.02 | 0.12 | 0.05 | 0.08 | 0.00 | 0.08 |
| Irig | 53.42 | 2.20 | 40.51 | 0.08 | 0.36 | 0.03 | 0.11 | 0.68 | 0.16 | 0.00 | 0.52 | 0.05 | 0.00 | 0.08 | 0.05 | 0.15 | 0.00 | 0.10 |
| Istok | 72.73 | 5.09 | 18.91 | 0.00 | 0.00 | 0.00 | 0.00 | 1.45 | 0.00 | 0.00 | 0.73 | 0.00 | 0.00 | 0.00 | 0.00 | 0.00 | 0.00 | 0.00 |
| Ivanjica | 42.04 | 1.77 | 53.09 | 0.18 | 0.01 | 0.02 | 0.10 | 0.58 | 0.24 | 0.00 | 0.62 | 0.02 | 0.01 | 0.06 | 0.05 | 0.05 | 0.02 | 0.12 |
| Jagodina | 35.97 | 10.94 | 49.47 | 0.07 | 0.02 | 0.03 | 0.28 | 0.77 | 0.19 | 0.01 | 0.41 | 0.05 | 0.02 | 0.09 | 0.06 | 0.16 | 0.02 | 0.13 |
| Kanjiža | 23.72 | 4.18 | 29.09 | 0.09 | 38.23 | 0.03 | 0.11 | 0.12 | 0.26 | 0.05 | 0.32 | 0.07 | 0.06 | 0.05 | 0.03 | 0.02 | 0.05 | 0.03 |
| Kikinda | 46.10 | 1.76 | 46.54 | 0.06 | 2.15 | 0.04 | 0.18 | 0.74 | 0.34 | 0.03 | 0.41 | 0.05 | 0.01 | 0.10 | 0.08 | 0.06 | 0.01 | 0.05 |
| Kladovo | 59.40 | 3.03 | 34.74 | 0.06 | 0.03 | 0.01 | 0.15 | 0.48 | 0.13 | 0.00 | 0.33 | 0.04 | 0.01 | 0.07 | 0.02 | 0.03 | 0.00 | 0.09 |
| Klina | 79.05 | 9.52 | 6.67 | 0.00 | 0.00 | 0.00 | 0.00 | 0.00 | 0.00 | 0.00 | 2.86 | 0.00 | 0.00 | 0.00 | 0.00 | 0.00 | 0.00 | 0.00 |
| Knić | 42.80 | 1.93 | 51.17 | 1.00 | 0.03 | 0.04 | 0.18 | 0.70 | 0.30 | 0.00 | 0.35 | 0.01 | 0.00 | 0.04 | 0.05 | 0.07 | 0.01 | 0.08 |
| Knjaževac | 51.60 | 2.74 | 41.57 | 0.13 | 0.02 | 0.01 | 0.15 | 1.02 | 0.28 | 0.02 | 0.61 | 0.09 | 0.02 | 0.09 | 0.03 | 0.03 | 0.02 | 0.12 |
| Koceljeva | 55.50 | 2.11 | 38.45 | 0.01 | 0.00 | 0.05 | 0.12 | 0.92 | 0.12 | 0.00 | 0.45 | 0.04 | 0.00 | 0.10 | 0.01 | 0.08 | 0.01 | 0.11 |
| Kosjerić | 35.30 | 3.58 | 57.41 | 0.18 | 0.06 | 0.00 | 0.08 | 1.53 | 0.15 | 0.00 | 0.29 | 0.00 | 0.00 | 0.06 | 0.04 | 0.03 | 0.04 | 0.01 |
| Kosovo Polje | 78.16 | 5.62 | 12.97 | 0.00 | 0.00 | 0.00 | 0.00 | 1.19 | 0.00 | 0.00 | 0.11 | 0.11 | 0.00 | 0.00 | 0.00 | 0.11 | 0.22 | 0.00 |
| Kosovska Kamenica | 79.40 | 2.21 | 15.67 | 0.00 | 0.00 | 0.03 | 0.06 | 0.69 | 0.00 | 0.09 | 0.09 | 0.00 | 0.00 | 0.06 | 0.00 | 0.00 | 0.00 | 0.03 |
| Kosovska Mitrovica | 61.76 | 1.23 | 32.12 | 0.05 | 0.00 | 0.07 | 0.16 | 1.25 | 0.07 | 0.02 | 0.45 | 0.00 | 0.05 | 0.11 | 0.02 | 0.05 | 0.00 | 0.02 |
| Kostolac | 50.13 | 1.87 | 44.13 | 0.19 | 0.12 | 0.46 | 0.08 | 0.49 | 0.27 | 0.05 | 0.30 | 0.06 | 0.01 | 0.05 | 0.04 | 0.01 | 0.04 | 0.14 |
| Kovačica | 39.11 | 1.90 | 54.16 | 0.22 | 1.27 | 0.01 | 0.19 | 0.39 | 0.16 | 0.05 | 0.42 | 0.04 | 0.02 | 0.11 | 0.08 | 0.04 | 0.01 | 0.08 |
| Kovin | 44.89 | 1.86 | 47.74 | 0.12 | 1.48 | 0.02 | 0.25 | 0.64 | 0.25 | 0.11 | 0.61 | 0.06 | 0.02 | 0.14 | 0.06 | 0.02 | 0.01 | 0.09 |
| Kragujevac | 35.39 | 2.02 | 57.98 | 1.08 | 0.03 | 0.02 | 0.15 | 0.93 | 0.34 | 0.01 | 0.46 | 0.06 | 0.02 | 0.11 | 0.05 | 0.09 | 0.01 | 0.12 |
| Kraljevo | 39.74 | 2.70 | 53.84 | 0.12 | 0.04 | 0.04 | 0.13 | 1.10 | 0.29 | 0.01 | 0.48 | 0.05 | 0.01 | 0.08 | 0.04 | 0.07 | 0.00 | 0.08 |
| Krupanj | 51.15 | 2.69 | 41.90 | 0.05 | 0.02 | 0.54 | 0.28 | 0.53 | 0.09 | 0.01 | 0.38 | 0.00 | 0.02 | 0.04 | 0.01 | 0.04 | 0.00 | 0.10 |
| Kruševac | 44.69 | 2.17 | 49.54 | 0.08 | 0.03 | 0.03 | 0.16 | 0.87 | 0.17 | 0.01 | 0.61 | 0.04 | 0.01 | 0.09 | 0.06 | 0.07 | 0.01 | 0.07 |
| Kučevo | 58.19 | 2.96 | 35.06 | 0.11 | 0.03 | 0.00 | 0.14 | 0.81 | 0.14 | 0.05 | 0.38 | 0.03 | 0.03 | 0.05 | 0.06 | 0.03 | 0.00 | 0.06 |
| Kula | 41.70 | 1.39 | 52.36 | 0.08 | 1.76 | 0.01 | 0.18 | 0.49 | 0.19 | 0.05 | 0.23 | 0.07 | 0.00 | 0.06 | 0.02 | 0.04 | 0.00 | 0.05 |
| Kuršumlija | 54.81 | 2.88 | 37.83 | 0.18 | 0.00 | 0.04 | 0.15 | 0.76 | 0.72 | 0.02 | 0.54 | 0.03 | 0.00 | 0.07 | 0.05 | 0.37 | 0.01 | 0.04 |
| Lajkovac | 42.95 | 1.22 | 52.62 | 0.05 | 0.00 | 0.02 | 0.07 | 0.62 | 0.28 | 0.01 | 0.23 | 0.06 | 0.02 | 0.02 | 0.05 | 0.14 | 0.02 | 0.05 |
| Lapovo | 48.08 | 3.43 | 44.76 | 0.04 | 0.07 | 0.02 | 0.25 | 0.76 | 0.11 | 0.02 | 0.52 | 0.07 | 0.04 | 0.11 | 0.02 | 0.07 | 0.00 | 0.11 |
| Lazarevac, Belgrade | 35.75 | 1.63 | 59.15 | 0.07 | 0.02 | 0.02 | 0.15 | 1.01 | 0.18 | 0.01 | 0.35 | 0.05 | 0.02 | 0.08 | 0.07 | 0.07 | 0.01 | 0.09 |
| Lebane | 60.83 | 3.57 | 32.14 | 0.11 | 0.01 | 0.01 | 0.08 | 0.75 | 0.19 | 0.04 | 0.52 | 0.01 | 0.00 | 0.06 | 0.03 | 0.03 | 0.02 | 0.08 |
| Leposavić | 62.95 | 1.73 | 31.42 | 0.08 | 0.02 | 0.02 | 0.18 | 0.73 | 0.08 | 0.04 | 0.53 | 0.02 | 0.02 | 0.10 | 0.04 | 0.04 | 0.00 | 0.00 |
| Leskovac | 48.34 | 3.76 | 44.64 | 0.10 | 0.04 | 0.02 | 0.14 | 0.72 | 0.23 | 0.02 | 0.52 | 0.04 | 0.03 | 0.08 | 0.04 | 0.06 | 0.01 | 0.06 |
| Lipljan | 77.81 | 7.22 | 10.90 | 0.00 | 0.00 | 0.04 | 0.04 | 1.09 | 0.04 | 0.04 | 0.00 | 0.00 | 0.00 | 0.04 | 0.04 | 0.00 | 0.00 | 0.00 |
| Loznica | 47.20 | 1.58 | 47.60 | 0.12 | 0.03 | 0.18 | 0.13 | 0.76 | 0.18 | 0.01 | 0.44 | 0.04 | 0.02 | 0.09 | 0.06 | 0.05 | 0.00 | 0.09 |
| Lučani | 46.34 | 3.02 | 47.40 | 0.39 | 0.03 | 0.02 | 0.06 | 0.76 | 0.08 | 0.01 | 0.37 | 0.03 | 0.02 | 0.03 | 0.06 | 0.06 | 0.03 | 0.08 |
| Ljig | 35.02 | 1.66 | 59.54 | 0.15 | 0.02 | 0.03 | 0.16 | 0.88 | 0.11 | 0.03 | 0.47 | 0.03 | 0.02 | 0.07 | 0.05 | 0.03 | 0.00 | 0.08 |
| Ljubovija | 48.09 | 7.66 | 36.55 | 5.20 | 0.04 | 0.01 | 0.03 | 0.46 | 0.14 | 0.01 | 0.20 | 0.01 | 0.00 | 0.09 | 0.03 | 0.04 | 0.01 | 0.05 |
| Majdanpek | 49.47 | 2.11 | 44.70 | 0.10 | 0.03 | 0.01 | 0.14 | 0.38 | 0.16 | 0.02 | 0.37 | 0.05 | 0.03 | 0.12 | 0.18 | 0.01 | 0.01 | 0.16 |
| Mali Iđoš | 40.16 | 1.47 | 33.82 | 0.06 | 20.92 | 0.06 | 0.16 | 0.42 | 0.10 | 0.06 | 0.27 | 0.03 | 0.02 | 0.03 | 0.05 | 0.03 | 0.00 | 0.02 |
| Mali Zvornik | 52.45 | 6.70 | 37.21 | 0.09 | 0.03 | 0.06 | 0.14 | 1.52 | 0.02 | 0.03 | 0.18 | 0.03 | 0.02 | 0.11 | 0.04 | 0.05 | 0.00 | 0.03 |
| Malo Crniće | 51.15 | 5.11 | 39.65 | 0.07 | 0.03 | 0.02 | 0.20 | 0.85 | 0.17 | 0.00 | 0.59 | 0.07 | 0.00 | 0.07 | 0.05 | 0.02 | 0.00 | 0.02 |
| Medijana, Niš | 29.08 | 1.54 | 66.23 | 0.07 | 0.03 | 0.02 | 0.12 | 0.83 | 0.29 | 0.00 | 0.45 | 0.10 | 0.03 | 0.08 | 0.06 | 0.13 | 0.01 | 0.07 |
| Medveđa | 49.88 | 4.77 | 31.87 | 0.06 | 0.00 | 0.00 | 0.09 | 0.62 | 0.32 | 0.06 | 0.59 | 0.15 | 0.06 | 0.09 | 0.06 | 0.03 | 8.71 | 0.03 |
| Merošina | 63.47 | 3.89 | 29.76 | 0.05 | 0.01 | 0.00 | 0.08 | 0.43 | 0.15 | 0.01 | 0.57 | 0.03 | 0.01 | 0.04 | 0.00 | 0.03 | 0.00 | 0.03 |
| Mionica | 43.27 | 2.57 | 51.36 | 0.25 | 0.02 | 0.05 | 0.09 | 0.59 | 0.05 | 0.01 | 0.26 | 0.01 | 0.02 | 0.04 | 0.02 | 0.04 | 0.01 | 0.06 |
| Mladenovac, Belgrade | 42.69 | 1.91 | 51.64 | 0.09 | 0.02 | 0.04 | 0.16 | 0.81 | 0.17 | 0.01 | 0.64 | 0.06 | 0.02 | 0.15 | 0.03 | 0.07 | 0.01 | 0.11 |
| Negotin | 55.60 | 3.66 | 37.35 | 0.06 | 0.03 | 0.03 | 0.17 | 0.44 | 0.33 | 0.01 | 0.46 | 0.14 | 0.02 | 0.11 | 0.03 | 0.05 | 0.01 | 0.08 |
| Niška Banja, Niš | 45.24 | 1.61 | 49.61 | 0.12 | 0.01 | 0.10 | 0.15 | 0.74 | 0.17 | 0.00 | 0.53 | 0.02 | 0.01 | 0.11 | 0.08 | 0.07 | 0.02 | 0.07 |
| Nova Crnja | 49.74 | 2.34 | 38.05 | 0.07 | 5.62 | 0.00 | 0.18 | 0.79 | 0.27 | 0.07 | 0.53 | 0.02 | 0.02 | 0.09 | 0.04 | 0.07 | 0.00 | 0.13 |
| Nova Varoš | 44.78 | 2.54 | 49.15 | 0.64 | 0.03 | 0.28 | 0.07 | 0.69 | 0.10 | 0.10 | 0.34 | 0.04 | 0.00 | 0.00 | 0.02 | 0.03 | 0.00 | 0.03 |
| Novi Bečej | 47.43 | 1.23 | 45.07 | 0.05 | 2.80 | 0.01 | 0.24 | 0.47 | 0.18 | 0.09 | 0.42 | 0.04 | 0.02 | 0.18 | 0.03 | 0.07 | 0.00 | 0.11 |
| Novi Beograd, Belgrade | 26.37 | 1.33 | 68.21 | 0.12 | 0.04 | 0.03 | 0.11 | 1.42 | 0.57 | 0.00 | 0.34 | 0.08 | 0.02 | 0.13 | 0.04 | 0.17 | 0.02 | 0.06 |
| Novi Kneževac | 43.73 | 1.51 | 38.25 | 0.11 | 12.01 | 0.04 | 0.28 | 0.49 | 0.19 | 0.04 | 0.45 | 0.04 | 0.02 | 0.07 | 0.06 | 0.06 | 0.00 | 0.07 |
| Novi Pazar | 18.83 | 1.50 | 38.28 | 20.65 | 0.01 | 6.83 | 0.02 | 0.20 | 0.23 | 9.83 | 0.16 | 0.01 | 0.08 | 0.01 | 0.00 | 0.01 | 0.06 | 0.02 |
| Novi Sad | 31.72 | 1.46 | 63.03 | 0.04 | 0.36 | 0.03 | 0.12 | 1.13 | 0.39 | 0.01 | 0.37 | 0.06 | 0.01 | 0.08 | 0.04 | 0.10 | 0.01 | 0.04 |
| Novo Brdo | 89.22 | 2.45 | 6.54 | 0.00 | 0.00 | 0.00 | 0.00 | 0.33 | 0.00 | 0.00 | 0.00 | 0.00 | 0.00 | 0.00 | 0.00 | 0.00 | 0.00 | 0.00 |
| Obilić | 83.17 | 3.64 | 8.93 | 0.09 | 0.00 | 0.00 | 0.17 | 0.69 | 0.09 | 0.26 | 0.17 | 0.09 | 0.00 | 0.00 | 0.00 | 0.09 | 0.00 | 0.00 |
| Obrenovac, Belgrade | 42.06 | 1.71 | 53.09 | 0.06 | 0.03 | 0.02 | 0.12 | 0.77 | 0.15 | 0.01 | 0.49 | 0.06 | 0.03 | 0.10 | 0.06 | 0.08 | 0.00 | 0.07 |
| Odžaci | 48.11 | 3.02 | 44.81 | 0.08 | 0.76 | 0.02 | 0.19 | 0.51 | 0.04 | 0.10 | 0.65 | 0.07 | 0.05 | 0.05 | 0.04 | 0.05 | 0.01 | 0.07 |
| Opovo | 42.70 | 2.04 | 51.58 | 0.22 | 0.05 | 0.08 | 0.20 | 0.82 | 0.22 | 0.00 | 0.45 | 0.08 | 0.02 | 0.17 | 0.02 | 0.02 | 0.00 | 0.10 |
| Orahovac | 59.57 | 21.30 | 16.09 | 0.00 | 0.00 | 0.00 | 0.00 | 0.87 | 0.00 | 0.00 | 0.00 | 0.43 | 0.00 | 0.00 | 0.00 | 0.00 | 0.00 | 0.00 |
| Osečina | 45.84 | 2.31 | 48.48 | 0.17 | 0.02 | 0.03 | 0.08 | 0.74 | 0.06 | 0.00 | 0.13 | 0.03 | 0.02 | 0.11 | 0.03 | 0.06 | 0.00 | 0.13 |
| Palilula, Belgrade | 32.30 | 1.27 | 62.52 | 0.11 | 0.04 | 0.06 | 0.15 | 1.09 | 0.36 | 0.02 | 0.58 | 0.10 | 0.02 | 0.11 | 0.05 | 0.13 | 0.01 | 0.07 |
| Palilula, Niš | 37.29 | 1.69 | 57.55 | 0.07 | 0.02 | 0.03 | 0.21 | 0.88 | 0.20 | 0.00 | 0.56 | 0.08 | 0.08 | 0.11 | 0.07 | 0.08 | 0.00 | 0.09 |
| Pančevo | 36.34 | 1.35 | 58.53 | 0.09 | 0.25 | 0.02 | 0.14 | 0.78 | 0.35 | 0.01 | 0.46 | 0.06 | 0.01 | 0.10 | 0.05 | 0.07 | 0.01 | 0.07 |
| Pantelej, Niš | 34.09 | 1.74 | 60.74 | 0.03 | 0.02 | 0.02 | 0.19 | 0.83 | 0.19 | 0.01 | 0.55 | 0.13 | 0.04 | 0.09 | 0.06 | 0.13 | 0.01 | 0.08 |
| Paraćin | 46.28 | 1.76 | 47.90 | 0.13 | 0.02 | 0.03 | 0.14 | 0.94 | 0.24 | 0.01 | 0.69 | 0.11 | 0.03 | 0.10 | 0.05 | 0.06 | 0.01 | 0.12 |
| Peć | 34.95 | 47.45 | 13.01 | 0.00 | 0.00 | 0.00 | 0.00 | 0.26 | 0.00 | 0.00 | 3.32 | 0.00 | 0.00 | 0.00 | 0.00 | 0.00 | 0.00 | 0.00 |
| Pećinci | 59.01 | 0.73 | 37.16 | 0.14 | 0.05 | 0.01 | 0.16 | 0.51 | 0.10 | 0.00 | 0.40 | 0.04 | 0.02 | 0.13 | 0.06 | 0.05 | 0.02 | 0.09 |
| Petrovac na Mlavi | 52.15 | 3.86 | 41.09 | 0.05 | 0.02 | 0.01 | 0.16 | 0.63 | 0.32 | 0.00 | 0.33 | 0.02 | 0.01 | 0.07 | 0.03 | 0.03 | 0.00 | 0.05 |
| Pirot | 44.89 | 2.56 | 48.94 | 0.19 | 0.03 | 0.12 | 0.17 | 0.67 | 0.15 | 0.01 | 0.71 | 0.07 | 0.03 | 0.10 | 0.05 | 0.08 | 0.00 | 0.10 |
| Plandište | 42.39 | 1.69 | 50.31 | 0.07 | 1.79 | 0.02 | 0.25 | 0.53 | 0.30 | 0.11 | 0.56 | 0.04 | 0.07 | 0.19 | 0.02 | 0.04 | 0.02 | 0.09 |
| Požarevac | 43.19 | 2.53 | 50.79 | 0.10 | 0.02 | 0.03 | 0.18 | 0.69 | 0.28 | 0.02 | 0.56 | 0.07 | 0.02 | 0.07 | 0.05 | 0.05 | 0.01 | 0.11 |
| Požega | 37.72 | 1.87 | 57.21 | 0.13 | 0.04 | 0.02 | 0.10 | 0.82 | 0.13 | 0.02 | 0.43 | 0.02 | 0.02 | 0.14 | 0.04 | 0.05 | 0.01 | 0.05 |
| Preševo | 11.05 | 1.56 | 1.48 | 0.25 | 0.01 | 5.55 | 0.01 | 0.03 | 0.02 | 0.01 | 1.45 | 0.01 | 0.03 | 0.02 | 0.01 | 0.05 | 77.65 | 0.02 |
| Priboj | 44.53 | 3.99 | 41.72 | 3.67 | 0.03 | 2.31 | 0.09 | 0.65 | 0.10 | 1.15 | 0.34 | 0.03 | 0.01 | 0.02 | 0.01 | 0.06 | 0.00 | 0.01 |
| Prijepolje | 40.62 | 2.07 | 42.54 | 5.49 | 0.02 | 4.66 | 0.05 | 0.31 | 0.13 | 2.17 | 0.17 | 0.02 | 0.01 | 0.04 | 0.02 | 0.01 | 0.01 | 0.02 |
| Priština | 74.22 | 5.49 | 16.66 | 0.00 | 0.00 | 0.00 | 0.03 | 0.89 | 0.06 | 0.00 | 0.21 | 0.00 | 0.03 | 0.09 | 0.00 | 0.12 | 0.03 | 0.00 |
| Prizren | 60.00 | 0.00 | 40.00 | 0.00 | 0.00 | 0.00 | 0.00 | 0.00 | 0.00 | 0.00 | 0.00 | 0.00 | 0.00 | 0.00 | 0.00 | 0.00 | 0.00 | 0.00 |
| Prokuplje | 51.85 | 2.39 | 42.67 | 0.05 | 0.02 | 0.03 | 0.12 | 0.66 | 0.10 | 0.01 | 0.66 | 0.04 | 0.03 | 0.05 | 0.03 | 0.06 | 0.00 | 0.08 |
| Rača | 44.65 | 3.14 | 48.25 | 0.08 | 0.02 | 0.00 | 0.11 | 1.11 | 0.33 | 0.00 | 0.44 | 0.02 | 0.02 | 0.05 | 0.06 | 0.00 | 0.05 | 0.11 |
| Rakovica, Belgrade | 30.82 | 1.60 | 63.35 | 0.09 | 0.04 | 0.02 | 0.18 | 1.35 | 0.36 | 0.01 | 0.57 | 0.10 | 0.02 | 0.11 | 0.05 | 0.15 | 0.01 | 0.08 |
| Raška | 47.93 | 6.70 | 42.14 | 0.25 | 0.03 | 0.03 | 0.11 | 0.80 | 0.06 | 0.01 | 0.50 | 0.01 | 0.01 | 0.09 | 0.03 | 0.04 | 0.01 | 0.05 |
| Ražanj | 57.91 | 2.81 | 35.29 | 0.19 | 0.07 | 0.07 | 0.17 | 0.61 | 0.15 | 0.00 | 0.63 | 0.07 | 0.02 | 0.07 | 0.05 | 0.02 | 0.02 | 0.19 |
| Rekovac | 47.22 | 8.71 | 40.35 | 0.28 | 0.08 | 0.04 | 0.21 | 0.91 | 0.11 | 0.04 | 0.13 | 0.00 | 0.00 | 0.17 | 0.02 | 0.00 | 0.02 | 0.09 |
| Ruma | 46.02 | 2.34 | 47.81 | 0.09 | 0.19 | 0.03 | 0.26 | 0.84 | 0.20 | 0.01 | 0.39 | 0.06 | 0.01 | 0.13 | 0.07 | 0.06 | 0.01 | 0.10 |
| Savski Venac, Belgrade | 26.26 | 1.46 | 67.84 | 0.16 | 0.07 | 0.02 | 0.12 | 1.38 | 0.80 | 0.00 | 0.55 | 0.10 | 0.02 | 0.12 | 0.03 | 0.14 | 0.01 | 0.03 |
| Sečanj | 52.08 | 1.64 | 42.13 | 0.08 | 0.90 | 0.04 | 0.18 | 0.57 | 0.17 | 0.17 | 0.33 | 0.04 | 0.00 | 0.14 | 0.00 | 0.01 | 0.00 | 0.07 |
| Senta | 23.19 | 0.63 | 43.05 | 0.04 | 29.54 | 0.04 | 0.08 | 0.16 | 0.24 | 0.03 | 0.14 | 0.08 | 0.05 | 0.06 | 0.05 | 0.02 | 0.06 | 0.05 |
| Sevojno | 40.32 | 1.87 | 55.25 | 0.16 | 0.04 | 0.02 | 0.16 | 0.72 | 0.27 | 0.02 | 0.20 | 0.00 | 0.00 | 0.07 | 0.04 | 0.02 | 0.00 | 0.07 |
| Sjenica | 25.49 | 5.91 | 24.89 | 7.83 | 0.03 | 16.59 | 0.01 | 0.57 | 0.23 | 14.32 | 0.14 | 0.02 | 1.73 | 0.01 | 0.02 | 0.01 | 0.04 | 0.00 |
| Smederevo | 41.55 | 1.90 | 51.48 | 0.08 | 0.04 | 0.03 | 0.19 | 0.96 | 0.20 | 0.01 | 0.64 | 0.05 | 0.01 | 0.22 | 0.06 | 0.12 | 0.01 | 0.08 |
| Smederevska Palanka | 47.01 | 2.09 | 47.21 | 0.08 | 0.02 | 0.03 | 0.13 | 0.88 | 0.22 | 0.00 | 0.46 | 0.06 | 0.04 | 0.11 | 0.07 | 0.07 | 0.00 | 0.15 |
| Sokobanja | 46.95 | 3.72 | 45.39 | 0.12 | 0.03 | 0.08 | 0.21 | 0.82 | 0.15 | 0.00 | 0.53 | 0.05 | 0.00 | 0.05 | 0.05 | 0.03 | 0.03 | 0.09 |
| Sombor | 41.10 | 1.55 | 51.41 | 0.09 | 2.30 | 0.03 | 0.26 | 0.79 | 0.34 | 0.04 | 0.41 | 0.08 | 0.03 | 0.13 | 0.06 | 0.08 | 0.01 | 0.06 |
| Sopot | 46.48 | 1.93 | 47.02 | 0.09 | 0.02 | 0.03 | 0.17 | 1.01 | 0.23 | 0.04 | 0.71 | 0.08 | 0.03 | 0.22 | 0.05 | 0.09 | 0.03 | 0.18 |
| Srbica | 69.77 | 9.30 | 13.95 | 0.00 | 0.00 | 0.00 | 0.00 | 3.49 | 0.00 | 0.00 | 1.16 | 0.00 | 0.00 | 0.00 | 0.00 | 0.00 | 0.00 | 0.00 |
| Srbobran | 42.42 | 1.66 | 48.77 | 0.16 | 2.99 | 0.01 | 0.22 | 1.11 | 0.19 | 0.05 | 0.37 | 0.05 | 0.03 | 0.15 | 0.05 | 0.01 | 0.03 | 0.12 |
| Sremska Mitrovica | 44.79 | 2.04 | 49.63 | 0.08 | 0.12 | 0.03 | 0.20 | 0.77 | 0.26 | 0.01 | 0.44 | 0.06 | 0.01 | 0.15 | 0.05 | 0.10 | 0.01 | 0.10 |
| Sremski Karlovci | 38.63 | 1.74 | 55.28 | 0.12 | 0.04 | 0.00 | 0.16 | 1.22 | 0.27 | 0.00 | 0.62 | 0.14 | 0.02 | 0.21 | 0.02 | 0.14 | 0.00 | 0.09 |
| Stara Pazova | 43.05 | 1.33 | 51.60 | 0.09 | 0.08 | 0.02 | 0.19 | 1.06 | 0.17 | 0.01 | 0.55 | 0.07 | 0.04 | 0.15 | 0.06 | 0.10 | 0.00 | 0.07 |
| Stari Grad, Belgrade | 20.80 | 1.30 | 73.23 | 0.11 | 0.04 | 0.02 | 0.12 | 1.59 | 1.04 | 0.01 | 0.29 | 0.12 | 0.02 | 0.08 | 0.03 | 0.26 | 0.02 | 0.02 |
| Subotica | 34.56 | 0.99 | 51.04 | 0.13 | 9.18 | 0.12 | 0.13 | 0.57 | 0.28 | 0.05 | 0.33 | 0.08 | 0.03 | 0.10 | 0.05 | 0.05 | 0.02 | 0.04 |
| Surčin, Belgrade | 46.25 | 1.25 | 48.51 | 0.13 | 0.05 | 0.04 | 0.21 | 1.04 | 0.18 | 0.01 | 0.50 | 0.07 | 0.02 | 0.15 | 0.05 | 0.06 | 0.01 | 0.10 |
| Surdulica | 36.89 | 31.67 | 28.95 | 0.06 | 0.01 | 0.02 | 0.06 | 0.35 | 0.14 | 0.00 | 0.11 | 0.04 | 0.02 | 0.09 | 0.02 | 0.05 | 0.00 | 0.05 |
| Svilajnac | 50.86 | 1.95 | 43.63 | 0.12 | 0.05 | 0.04 | 0.17 | 0.74 | 0.30 | 0.02 | 0.36 | 0.06 | 0.05 | 0.11 | 0.01 | 0.09 | 0.02 | 0.05 |
| Svrljig | 49.80 | 4.24 | 42.37 | 0.10 | 0.10 | 0.04 | 0.04 | 0.79 | 0.11 | 0.01 | 0.72 | 0.07 | 0.04 | 0.16 | 0.03 | 0.14 | 0.04 | 0.11 |
| Šabac | 40.71 | 1.62 | 53.67 | 0.17 | 0.02 | 0.02 | 0.29 | 0.92 | 0.14 | 0.02 | 0.47 | 0.05 | 0.02 | 0.12 | 0.05 | 0.09 | 0.01 | 0.09 |
| Šid | 50.27 | 2.53 | 43.66 | 0.15 | 0.06 | 0.02 | 0.17 | 0.69 | 0.18 | 0.04 | 0.36 | 0.05 | 0.05 | 0.14 | 0.09 | 0.05 | 0.01 | 0.06 |
| Štrpce | 76.46 | 1.82 | 13.69 | 0.00 | 0.00 | 0.00 | 0.00 | 1.31 | 0.00 | 0.00 | 0.15 | 0.00 | 0.00 | 0.07 | 0.04 | 0.00 | 0.00 | 0.04 |
| Temerin | 38.41 | 1.39 | 49.20 | 0.06 | 7.54 | 0.02 | 0.11 | 0.71 | 0.11 | 0.01 | 0.51 | 0.06 | 0.00 | 0.07 | 0.03 | 0.05 | 0.03 | 0.08 |
| Titel | 51.92 | 1.54 | 42.50 | 0.05 | 0.23 | 0.00 | 0.20 | 0.89 | 0.24 | 0.07 | 0.42 | 0.02 | 0.04 | 0.12 | 0.04 | 0.02 | 0.00 | 0.00 |
| Topola | 39.98 | 2.59 | 53.38 | 0.08 | 0.04 | 0.05 | 0.13 | 0.96 | 0.11 | 0.01 | 0.74 | 0.05 | 0.01 | 0.13 | 0.08 | 0.02 | 0.02 | 0.12 |
| Trgovište | 81.15 | 1.46 | 15.82 | 0.00 | 0.00 | 0.00 | 0.03 | 0.15 | 0.06 | 0.00 | 0.03 | 0.00 | 0.00 | 0.00 | 0.00 | 0.00 | 0.00 | 0.03 |
| Trstenik | 45.05 | 2.09 | 48.29 | 0.19 | 0.07 | 0.05 | 0.20 | 1.05 | 0.18 | 0.01 | 0.64 | 0.10 | 0.06 | 0.12 | 0.05 | 0.10 | 0.01 | 0.10 |
| Tutin | 12.73 | 0.56 | 20.09 | 11.46 | 0.00 | 14.20 | 0.02 | 0.02 | 0.20 | 35.45 | 1.59 | 0.01 | 0.29 | 0.03 | 0.00 | 0.00 | 0.02 | 0.00 |
| Ub | 52.77 | 1.43 | 42.70 | 0.08 | 0.03 | 0.04 | 0.11 | 0.58 | 0.08 | 0.02 | 0.34 | 0.04 | 0.02 | 0.06 | 0.04 | 0.02 | 0.02 | 0.10 |
| Uroševac | 65.85 | 2.44 | 21.95 | 0.00 | 0.00 | 0.00 | 0.00 | 2.44 | 0.00 | 0.00 | 0.00 | 0.00 | 0.00 | 0.00 | 0.00 | 0.00 | 0.00 | 0.00 |
| Užice | 33.78 | 1.53 | 61.36 | 0.17 | 0.02 | 0.04 | 0.13 | 0.85 | 0.45 | 0.02 | 0.32 | 0.04 | 0.02 | 0.10 | 0.04 | 0.11 | 0.01 | 0.07 |
| Valjevo | 32.87 | 2.31 | 61.17 | 0.10 | 0.03 | 0.03 | 0.15 | 0.95 | 0.17 | 0.01 | 0.35 | 0.05 | 0.01 | 0.08 | 0.04 | 0.07 | 0.01 | 0.08 |
| Varvarin | 51.50 | 2.58 | 42.52 | 0.04 | 0.04 | 0.07 | 0.13 | 0.60 | 0.08 | 0.04 | 0.38 | 0.00 | 0.02 | 0.09 | 0.04 | 0.02 | 0.01 | 0.10 |
| Velika Plana | 45.81 | 2.64 | 46.94 | 0.11 | 0.02 | 0.02 | 0.20 | 1.36 | 0.20 | 0.01 | 0.70 | 0.10 | 0.05 | 0.09 | 0.04 | 0.04 | 0.01 | 0.09 |
| Veliko Gradište | 53.58 | 3.98 | 38.72 | 0.12 | 0.03 | 0.02 | 0.08 | 0.74 | 0.53 | 0.03 | 0.47 | 0.07 | 0.02 | 0.03 | 0.06 | 0.06 | 0.00 | 0.05 |
| Vitina | 79.61 | 1.03 | 13.42 | 0.00 | 0.00 | 0.00 | 0.13 | 4.00 | 0.00 | 0.00 | 0.39 | 0.00 | 0.00 | 0.00 | 0.00 | 0.00 | 0.00 | 0.00 |
| Vladičin Han | 54.26 | 2.90 | 39.36 | 0.23 | 0.03 | 0.05 | 0.23 | 0.87 | 0.17 | 0.02 | 0.25 | 0.04 | 0.06 | 0.10 | 0.07 | 0.04 | 0.06 | 0.06 |
| Vladimirci | 53.02 | 2.10 | 41.04 | 0.22 | 0.05 | 0.03 | 0.15 | 0.62 | 0.10 | 0.04 | 0.35 | 0.03 | 0.02 | 0.13 | 0.00 | 0.03 | 0.01 | 0.07 |
| Vlasotince | 52.58 | 4.57 | 39.87 | 0.06 | 0.02 | 0.02 | 0.10 | 0.75 | 0.12 | 0.01 | 0.35 | 0.07 | 0.02 | 0.07 | 0.02 | 0.04 | 0.01 | 0.09 |
| Voždovac, Belgrade | 28.98 | 1.40 | 65.55 | 0.09 | 0.03 | 0.03 | 0.12 | 1.32 | 0.47 | 0.01 | 0.47 | 0.07 | 0.03 | 0.07 | 0.04 | 0.14 | 0.01 | 0.06 |
| Vračar, Belgrade | 21.95 | 1.50 | 72.29 | 0.09 | 0.04 | 0.02 | 0.10 | 1.39 | 1.09 | 0.00 | 0.27 | 0.09 | 0.03 | 0.09 | 0.04 | 0.16 | 0.01 | 0.05 |
| Vranje | 51.86 | 3.08 | 41.19 | 0.65 | 0.04 | 0.02 | 0.12 | 0.58 | 0.11 | 0.00 | 0.51 | 0.04 | 0.01 | 0.08 | 0.05 | 0.05 | 0.02 | 0.09 |
| Vrbas | 40.32 | 2.86 | 53.46 | 0.06 | 0.33 | 0.02 | 0.21 | 0.69 | 0.13 | 0.05 | 0.24 | 0.04 | 0.02 | 0.07 | 0.05 | 0.04 | 0.01 | 0.06 |
| Vrnjačka Banja | 47.29 | 1.56 | 47.44 | 0.20 | 0.03 | 0.13 | 0.13 | 0.81 | 0.14 | 0.01 | 0.45 | 0.03 | 0.02 | 0.12 | 0.03 | 0.02 | 0.01 | 0.13 |
| Vršac | 38.91 | 1.59 | 55.50 | 0.08 | 0.29 | 0.04 | 0.21 | 0.67 | 0.34 | 0.06 | 0.43 | 0.09 | 0.02 | 0.12 | 0.06 | 0.08 | 0.01 | 0.07 |
| Vučitrn | 76.17 | 2.07 | 16.53 | 0.00 | 0.00 | 0.00 | 0.14 | 1.10 | 0.00 | 0.00 | 0.41 | 0.00 | 0.00 | 0.00 | 0.00 | 0.00 | 0.00 | 0.14 |
| Zaječar | 42.42 | 2.78 | 51.29 | 0.20 | 0.04 | 0.04 | 0.15 | 0.61 | 0.19 | 0.00 | 0.62 | 0.10 | 0.02 | 0.06 | 0.06 | 0.07 | 0.02 | 0.10 |
| Zemun | 34.70 | 1.34 | 60.03 | 0.12 | 0.04 | 0.04 | 0.16 | 1.16 | 0.35 | 0.01 | 0.51 | 0.07 | 0.02 | 0.12 | 0.05 | 0.13 | 0.01 | 0.08 |
| Zrenjanin | 38.22 | 1.41 | 55.51 | 0.09 | 1.25 | 0.02 | 0.14 | 1.02 | 0.32 | 0.03 | 0.37 | 0.04 | 0.03 | 0.13 | 0.04 | 0.05 | 0.01 | 0.07 |
| Zubin Potok | 72.07 | 1.49 | 23.74 | 0.05 | 0.00 | 0.00 | 0.05 | 0.72 | 0.00 | 0.00 | 0.09 | 0.05 | 0.00 | 0.00 | 0.09 | 0.00 | 0.00 | 0.05 |
| Zvečan | 60.49 | 2.50 | 32.48 | 0.11 | 0.00 | 0.04 | 0.32 | 1.62 | 0.11 | 0.00 | 0.28 | 0.04 | 0.00 | 0.11 | 0.04 | 0.00 | 0.00 | 0.07 |
| Zvezdara, Belgrade | 26.38 | 1.33 | 68.63 | 0.13 | 0.03 | 0.03 | 0.10 | 1.22 | 0.47 | 0.00 | 0.44 | 0.07 | 0.01 | 0.08 | 0.04 | 0.15 | 0.01 | 0.04 |
| Žabalj | 46.43 | 1.13 | 48.43 | 0.05 | 0.08 | 0.01 | 0.21 | 0.97 | 0.10 | 0.06 | 0.53 | 0.06 | 0.03 | 0.12 | 0.10 | 0.07 | 0.00 | 0.08 |
| Žabari | 56.77 | 3.56 | 35.80 | 0.16 | 0.02 | 0.00 | 0.14 | 1.03 | 0.25 | 0.00 | 0.47 | 0.02 | 0.07 | 0.13 | 0.02 | 0.05 | 0.02 | 0.04 |
| Žagubica | 62.50 | 1.89 | 32.73 | 0.11 | 0.09 | 0.05 | 0.08 | 0.43 | 0.00 | 0.02 | 0.49 | 0.03 | 0.00 | 0.02 | 0.03 | 0.00 | 0.03 | 0.03 |
| Žitište | 46.79 | 3.27 | 40.26 | 0.11 | 5.71 | 0.05 | 0.17 | 1.08 | 0.26 | 0.09 | 0.27 | 0.01 | 0.00 | 0.03 | 0.05 | 0.06 | 0.07 | 0.03 |
| Žitorađa | 62.56 | 3.84 | 31.22 | 0.04 | 0.04 | 0.03 | 0.10 | 0.24 | 0.09 | 0.01 | 0.56 | 0.01 | 0.00 | 0.06 | 0.02 | 0.01 | 0.00 | 0.04 |

=== Maps ===
Two-way (SL, US) result by municipality

== Aftermath ==
=== Reactions ===
==== Domestic ====
At 21:31 on election night, Vučić conceded defeat at the SNS headquarters, saying that "on the basis of a stratified sample, it is clear that we have lost these elections" and that the Student List would win between 135 and 140 seats and his list around 105. He said that SNS would "show them what opposition is", and that while some businessmen would now leave the party, its structure remained "very solid". After Vučić's concession, people celebrated in the streets of Belgrade and other cities, and in Belgrade a crowd removed the fences and tents of pro-SNS Ćaciland Protest Camp in Pioneers Park. Srdanović said that Serbia had won and that he was proud of a people who had said "no" to tyranny, adding: "We are heading towards a civilised and better Serbia." Dačić said that SPS and its partners had not achieved their goal, describing the atmosphere as that of a referendum, while Miloš Jovanović said that "Authentic Right" had not entered the National Assembly and congratulated the Student List on its victory. The following day, Jovanović announced that he was resigning as president of NDSS and withdrawing from public life. The leaders of the "European Serbia" list, which won around 0.3% of the vote, welcomed the result: Zdravko Ponoš said that "the real Serbia won" with the Student List's victory, Marinika Tepić said that "the goal has been achieved", referring to the fall of Vučić's government, and Dragan Đilas said that "there are no people happier than us today", describing his list's own result as "completely ephemeral".

==== International ====
Ursula von der Leyen, the President of the European Commission, and António Costa, the President of the European Council, congratulated the Student List, as did Marta Kos, the European Commissioner for Enlargement, who said that "the doors of the EU are open". Alain Berset, the Secretary General of the Council of Europe, said that Serbian citizens had made their democratic choice. German chancellor Friedrich Merz congratulated the Student List and said that Germany would actively support Serbia's European path, and French president Emmanuel Macron spoke with Srdanović on 2 November, congratulating him on a victory marked by historically high turnout and saying that France remained a friend of Serbia.

Hungarian prime minister Péter Magyar congratulated the Student List and assured its leaders of Hungary's support. Slovenian prime minister Janez Janša said that Slovenia would welcome faster accession talks, but would not consent to any progress until Serbia handed over the archives of the former Yugoslav security services concerning Slovenia. Croatian prime minister Andrej Plenković congratulated Srdanović by phone and described the list's messages as "moderate, rational and reasonable". Montenegrin president Jakov Milatović and prime minister Milojko Spajić congratulated the list, as did Milorad Dodik, the leader of the Alliance of Independent Social Democrats in Bosnia and Herzegovina, and Bosnian foreign minister Elmedin Konaković, who expected Serbia to respect Bosnia and Herzegovina's sovereignty and territorial integrity. Kosovo's Albin Kurti said that he hoped the political change would be followed by "a positive change in official Belgrade's approach towards Kosovo". Ukrainian president Volodymyr Zelenskyy said that a "new chapter" in Serbian history had begun and wished the country success.

The United States Department of State said that it was aware of the preliminary results, including Vučić's acknowledgement of defeat, and that it looked forward to further advancing the partnership with Serbia, including the strategic dialogue launched in 2026, and to working with the newly elected members of the National Assembly; the Helsinki Commission of the US Congress said that Vučić's defeat showed "the strength of popular movements, even in authoritarian states". Kremlin spokesman Dmitry Peskov said that Russia valued Vučić's contribution to bilateral relations and hoped that the new authorities would see that cooperation with Russia was in Serbia's interest, adding that "it takes two to tango", while foreign ministry spokeswoman Maria Zakharova expressed the hope that Serbia's new leadership would continue a policy of "mutually beneficial and equal cooperation" with Russia; Russian state media promoted Vučić's claims of a "colour revolution". Chinese foreign ministry spokesperson Guo Jiakun said that China respected the choice of the Serbian people and hoped to strengthen political trust and practical cooperation with the new government.

Srdanović said that he saw no obstacle to closer cooperation and further integration with the EU, while noting that public support for EU membership had fallen; during the campaign, the student movement had stated that Serbia would maintain its stance against sanctions on Russia. According to Hromadske, the list's leaders also pledged to halt arms exports to war zones.

=== Allegations of a planned self-coup ===
British newspaper The Times claimed that, based on unnamed sources, Vučić had begun preparations for a self-coup to cling to power, but was persuaded to accept the result in phone calls with European leaders, including former Hungarian prime minister Viktor Orbán. Former Special Anti-Terrorist Unit (SAJ) commander Spasoje Vulević claimed that Vučić deployed up to 7,000 personnel to the centre of Belgrade, including police forces and "thugs". Vučić denied the accusations and said that Orbán had been the first foreign leader to call him, but only after he had conceded. Suzana Vasiljević, a spokeswoman for Vučić, attributed the increased police presence to threats from violent protesters.

=== Media ===
On 26 October, the 17:00 news programme of Radio Television of Vojvodina (RTV), the provincial public broadcaster, opened with footage of the election-night celebrations in Novi Sad and an apology to viewers; presenter Goran Eror read a statement saying that "for many years, the public service did not perform its function, and for that reason we owe viewers an apology". The same day, Nenad Ćaćić resigned as acting editor of RTV's first television channel at the request of part of the staff and of the director-general, Goran Karadžić. On 27 October, Verica Batić, the acting director of RTV's first radio channel, and Vesna Iskrin, the editor of its web desk, also resigned, followed on 30 October by Karadžić himself.

On 28 October, Manja Grčić, the director-general of Radio Television of Serbia (RTS), resigned, a day after the Student List had demanded the "unblocking, departisation and liberation" of RTS from political influence; before resigning, she had removed Bojana Mlađenović as editor of the news programme. RTS's new news editorial board apologised to viewers "for everything omitted in the previous period". Željko Mitrović, the owner of the pro-government TV Pink, announced the dismissal of around 1,000 employees, while some other pro-government outlets moved to a more neutral stance; Informer and Pink remained loyal to Vučić. On 26 October, a group of citizens entered the building of Informer TV and interrupted its live broadcast; Vučić called it "unprecedented violence", while Students in Blockade said that they did not support or call for incursions into media outlets. On 4 November, REM unanimously banned Informer TV's programme Prve info for seven days over its coverage during the campaign, the first time it had imposed a temporary ban on a broadcaster.

=== Arrests and investigations ===
In the days after the election, prosecutors opened a series of investigations into officials and businesspeople linked to SNS. The head of the police's Criminal Police Directorate and another senior police official were detained on suspicion of abuse of office in connection with a murder investigation, and on 30 October police searched the Ministry of Construction, Transport and Infrastructure over allegations that official documents were being destroyed. On 2 November, Davor Macura, the owner of Alta banka, which had risen to prominence under SNS, was detained on suspicion of illegally moving 45 billion dinars out of the bank, after the National Bank of Serbia had revoked its licence; the following day, Jugoslav Nikolić, the director of the Republic Hydrometeorological Service, was arrested on suspicion of money laundering. Prosecutors also pursued cases of suspected electoral fraud: in Novi Sad, four people were arrested for buying votes for United Serbia at 6,000 dinars per vote, while in Mali Zvornik six people were accused of issuing false residence papers to Bosnian citizens so that they could vote for the SNS-led list. The organised crime prosecutor's office opened proceedings to establish whether people had been placed under illegal surveillance by the Security and Intelligence Agency (BIA). Vučić accused the student movement of "revolutionary terror" and said that investigators would find nothing against him.

=== Government formation ===
Following the announcement of the final results on 5 November, the constitutive sitting of the new National Assembly has to be held within 30 days; it is convened by Brnabić as president of the outgoing Assembly, who had said that she would do so as soon as the final results were announced, and that the presidential election would be called by 27 December. The government then has to be elected within 90 days of the constitution of the Assembly, on the proposal of a prime ministerial candidate nominated by the president after consultations with the representatives of the electoral lists. The Student List, which does not need coalition partners, said that decisions on the prime minister and ministers would be taken jointly with the student movement, and that no names had yet been confirmed; Srdanović said that the new government's first priority would be the rule of law. With SNS having lost in Belgrade and most towns, calls also grew for early local elections.

== See also ==
- Novi Sad railway station canopy collapse
- 2024–2026 Serbian anti-corruption protests
- 2026 Serbian presidential election
- 2026 Hungarian parliamentary election
