= Opinion polling for the 2026 Serbian parliamentary election =

In the run-up to the 2026 Serbian parliamentary election, various organisations carry out opinion polling to gauge voting intentions in Serbia. The results of such polls are displayed in this list. The date range for these opinion polls is from the previous election, held on 17 December 2023, to 25 October 2026.

== Analysis ==
Analyst Dejan Bursać of the Institute for Political Studies argued that the rating SNS received in opinion polls mostly came from Vučić's popularity, citing the high trust in the office of president of Serbia in opinion polls and voters perception of Vučić still being the president of the party. Bojan Vranić, a professor at the Faculty of Political Sciences of University of Belgrade, criticised the lack of turnout numbers in opinion polls and the presentation of party ratings.

A study by the Bureau for Social Research, which evaluated 32 polls published in Serbia between 1 January 2024 and 8 September 2026 against World Association for Public Opinion Research standards, has shown that most polling agencies publish basic surface-level metrics, yet they frequently omit the technical and financial details required to verify their findings independently.

== Graphical summary ==
Local regression chart of poll results from 17 December 2023 to the present day

== Poll results ==
Several polling agencies have conducted opinion polls ahead of the next Serbian parliamentary election, including Nova srpska politička misao, Faktor Plus, Sprint Insight, and Ipsos. These polls provide an overview of the current political landscape in Serbia and reflect trends in voter preferences over time. The Opposition and independent media accuse polling agencies Ipsos and Faktor Plus of pro-government bias. CRTA's poll published on 15 July 2026 marked the first time any political option other than SNS took first place in a regular national poll since July 1st 2010, over 16 years prior.

=== 2026 ===
Polling firm	Date of publication	Sample size	SNS–led coalition	PES		NPS (Note: Announced their withdrawal from the election and support for the Student list.)	ZLF	DS	SPS–JS	NADA		MI–SN (Note: Will not run in the elections.)	KP	SL	Others	Lead
Polling firm	Date of publication	Sample size	SNS–led coalition	SSP	SRCE	NPS	ZLF	DS	SPS–JS	NDSS	POKS	MI–SN	KP	SL	Others	Lead
2026 election	25 October	–	39.5	0.3		–	–	–	2.2	0.9		–	–	53.7	3.4	14.2
Ipsos (Note: Poll commissioned on the orders of Aleksandar Vučić – United Serbia coalition.)	22 October	3,624	47.4	0.8		–	–	–	3.2	1.7		–	–	40.0	6.9 (Note: VMSZ/SVM:1.3%, PSS:0.6%, SDP–CDP:0.5%, AzS:0.3%, SDAS:0.3%,SPP:0.3%, RS:0.2%,SRSJ:0.2%, PTIFY:0.2%, LZS:0.1%, AK:0.1%, KS:0.1%, estimated 2.5% invalid/spoiled ballots.)	7.4
NSPM	20 October	1,050	42.7	2.7		–	–	–	2.9	2.5		–	–	44.5	4.7	1.8
Faktor Plus	21 September	986	48.6	3.6		–	–	–	4.9	2.8		1.2	–	37.1	1.8	11.5
Faktor Plus	4 September	1,200	47.2	3.6		3.4 (Note: Together with NLS and EU)	–	–	4.9	2.1		2.9	–	31.5	4.4 (Note: SRS: 2.0%, Others: 2.4%)	15.7
NSPM	30 July	1,000	37.5	4.2		5.6 (Note: Together with NLS, EU and PODES)	–	–	4.9	2.3	–	3.8	–	39.6	2.1	2.1
CRTA	15 July	2,324	35.7	0.9	0.4	2.2	0.4	0.8	3.8	1.5	–	2.0	2.8	44.9	4.6 (Note: SRS: 1.4%, SSZ: 0.9%, VMSZ/SVM:1.3%)	9.2 (Note: Undecided (excluded): 12.2%)
Faktor Plus	26 June	1,200	47.1	4.5		3.8 (Note: Together with NLS)	–	–	5.0	2.2		3.0	–	30.7	3.7 (Note: SRS: 2.0%, Others: 1.7%)	16.4
Faktor Plus	30 April	1,000	46.4	8.6 (Note: Together with EU, PSG and SDS)					5.0	2.5		3.0	1.8	28.7	4.0 (Note: SRS: 2.0%, SSZ: 1.0%, , Others: 2.0%)	19.7

=== 2025 ===
Polling firm	Date of publication	Sample size	SNS–led coalition	SPS–JS	SSP	SRCE	NPS	ZLF	DS	NADA		MI–SN	KP	SL	Others	Lead
Polling firm	Date of publication	Sample size	SNS–led coalition	SPS–JS	SSP	SRCE	NPS	ZLF	DS	NDSS	POKS	MI–SN	KP	SL	Others	Lead
Ipsos	2 September	1,220	48.2	5.3	5.0	0.9	3.3	2	2.1	2.6	0.4	2.9	6.2	8.1 (Note: Only spontaneous answer as it was not part of the pre-selected options so making it regular poll and instead of a scenario poll.)	13.0 (Note: NLS: 2.4%, SRS: 2%, VMSZ: 1.6%, DJB: 1.3%, EU: 0.8%, SDS: 0.5%, Narodna: 0.5%, LSV: 0.4%, SDPS: 0.4%, SSZ: 0.3%, PSG: 0.3%, MI–GiN: 0.3%, PUPS: 0.2%, JS 0.1%, SPP: 0.1%, Others: 1.4%)	42.9
Faktor Plus	2 August	1,200	47.8	7.3	4.4	1.5	4.2	2.5	2.2	2.9		4.2	3.8	8.7	6.1 (Note: EU: 1.8%, PSG: 1.1%, SRS: 1.1%, SDS: 1.1%)	39.1
Ipsos	30 July	1,200	46.6	6.4	4.1	1.7	2.5	2.1	3.1	2.7	0.7	3.5	6.8	5.0	13.1 (Note: NLS: 3.3%, SRS: 1.7%, EU: 1.7%, VMSZ: 1.5%, DJB: 1.2%, SDS: 0.9%, SSZ: 0.7%, PSG: 0.6%, LSV: 0.4%, PS: 0.4%, JS 0.3%, Narodna: 0.3%, MI–GiN: 0.3%, SDPS: 0.3%, PUPS: 0.2%, SPP: 0.2%, SDAS: 0.1%, Dveri: 0.1%, Others: 0.7%)	41.5
NSPM	24 July	1,100	40.2 (Note: Together with SRS and SSZ)		3.6		4.5 (Note: Together with EU)	1.2 (Note: Together with PSG)	1.5	2.7		2.8	2.5	23.5	18.9 (Note: Others: 2.5%, while 15.3% of respondents had stated that they would vote for the opposition)	16.7
NSPM	27 June (Note: The opinion poll was conducted in May 2025.)	1,050	35.1	5.7	3.4		4.3	3.1		3.0		3.2	2.8	20.5	18.9 (Note: LJVN: 1.3%, Others: 1.0%, while 16.6% of respondents had stated that they would vote for the opposition)	14.6
NSPM	30 March	–	36.0	6.4	7.1		6.4	5.8		8.2			5.3	—N/a	24.8 (Note: Others: 4.0%, while 20.8% of respondents had stated that they would vote for the opposition)	27.8

=== 2024 ===
Polling firm	Date of publication	Sample size	SNS–led coalition	SSP	SRCE	NPS	ZLF	DS	SPS–JS	NADA		MI–SN	KP	Others	Lead
Polling firm	Date of publication	Sample size	SNS–led coalition	SSP	SRCE	NPS	ZLF	DS	SPS–JS	NDSS	POKS	MI–SN	KP	Others	Lead
Ipsos	25 December (Note: The opinion poll was conducted in October 2024.)	–	48.3	5.8	1.8	2.4	2.1	3.0	6.4	3.5	0.8	4.7	5.2	16.2 (Note: SRS: 2.0%, VMSZ: 1.6%, EU: 1.6%, PSG: 1.5%, NLS: 1.2%, SDPS: 1.1%, DJB: 0.7%, MI–GiN: 0.6%, SDS: 0.6%, SPP: 0.5%, Dveri: 0.5%, SSZ: 0.4%, PS: 0.4%, Together: 0.4%, SDAS: 0.3%, LSV: 0.2%, Narodna: 0.2%, PUPS: 0.2%, Others: 2.0%)	43.3
Faktor Plus	25 December	1,180	51.1	7.8	2.7	4.1	3.0	2.1	7.6	3.8		5.6	5.7	6.1 (Note: Others: 6.1%, Undecided (excluded): 6.7%)	43.3
Faktor Plus	27 September	2,000	54.0	8.0	2.5	4.6	2.7	–	8.9	4.3	–	4.6	5.4	5.0 (Note: Others: 5.0%, Undecided (excluded): 13.3%)	39.1
2023 election	17 December	–	48.1	24.3					6.7	5.2		– (Note: Part of MI–GIN)	–	22.4	23.8

== Scenario polls ==
=== United opposition and student-led list ===
In March 2025, Nova srpska politička misao started conducting a scenario poll featuring two joint lists, a SNS–SPS one and a joint opposition list. In June, Sprint Insight conducted a poll featuring two joint lists, an SNS led one, and a student list. NSPM polled a combined student & opposition list in July and in September polled two options, "for" and "against" government.

Polling firm	Fieldwork date	Sample size	SNS–SPS, et al.	Opposition	Student list	Others	Lead
NSPM	20–28 April 2026	1,000	43.6	56.4		–	12.8 (Note: Undecided (excluded): 21%)
NSPM	December 2025	1,500	46.1	53.9		–	7.8 (Note: Undecided (excluded): 24%)
CRTA	13–27 September	2,020	42.1	–	57.9	–	15.8
NSPM	28 August–8 September	1,050	44.4	55.6		–	11.2 (Note: Undecided (excluded): 25.2%)
NSPM	2–12 July	1,100	43.7	56.3		–	12.5
Sprint Insight	23 June–5 July	1,458	42.1	–	54.8	3.9 (Note: Undecided)	12.7
Sprint Insight	23 June–5 July	1,458	41.4	10.2	45.9	2.5	4.5
NSPM	15–25 May	1,050	43.4	56.5		–	13.1 (Note: Undecided (excluded): 22.9%)
NSPM	1–10 March	1,050	44.3	55.7	–	–	11.4 (Note: Undecided (excluded): 25.9%)
