= NSPM =

NSPM may refer to:

- Nova srpska politička misao, a Belgrade-based publisher and quarterly magazine founded in 1994
- National Security Presidential Memorandum, the name for national security directives under the Donald Trump presidency
