= Albanian Coalition of Preševo Valley =

Political coalition in Serbia

Albanian Coalition of Preševo Valley Koalicioni i Shqiptarëve të Luginës së Preshevës Коалиција Албанаца Прешевске долине
- Abbreviation: KShLP; KAPD
- Leader: Shaip Kamberi
- Founder: Riza Halimi
- Headquarters: Preševo
- Ideology: Regionalism; Albanian minority interests
- Members: Party for Democratic Action; Democratic Party; Movement for Democratic Progress
- National Assembly: 2 / 250

The Albanian Coalition of Preševo Valley (Albanian: Koalicioni i Shqiptarëve të Luginës së Preshevës, abbr. KShLP; Serbian: Коалиција Албанаца Прешевске долине, romanized: Koalicija Albanaca Preševske doline, abbr. KAPD) is a coalition of regionalist political parties in Serbia, representing the Albanian ethnic minority.

== Electoral results ==
It ran as list number 17 in the election in January 2007, winning 16,973 votes, equalling 0.42% of the national vote, and gaining one seat.

In the election in May 2008, they won 16,801 votes, equalling 0.41% of the national vote, and gaining again one seat.

In the election in May 2012, they ran as list number 15 winning 13,384 votes, equalling 0.30% of the national vote, and gaining again one seat.

In the 2026 parliamentary election, the coalition won 27,683 votes (0.63%) and two seats, one more than in 2023.

=== Parliamentary elections ===
National Assembly of Serbia
Year	Leader	Popular vote	% of popular vote	#	# of seats	Seat change	Status	Ref.
2007	Riza Halimi	16,973	0.43%	▲13th	1 / 250	▲1	Opposition	
2008	Riza Halimi	16,801	0.41%	▲9th	1 / 250	0	Opposition	
2012	Riza Halimi	13,384	0.36%	▼16th	1 / 250	0	Opposition	
2020	Shaip Kamberi	26,437	0.85%	▲14th	3 / 250	▲2	Opposition	
2022	Shaip Kamberi	10,165	0.28%	▼16th	1 / 250	▼2	Opposition	
2023	Shaip Kamberi	13,501	0.36%	▲13th	1 / 250	0	Opposition	
2026	Shaip Kamberi	27,683	0.63%	▲6th	2 / 250	▲1	TBA	

== See also ==
- Albanians in Serbia
