= Miloš Pavlović (student) =

- Милош Павловић

Member of the National Assembly
- Incumbent
- Assumed office TBD

Personal details
- Born: Doboj, Republika Srpska, Bosnia and Herzegovina
- Party: SNS (2025–present)
- Education: University of Belgrade
- Occupation: Student; activist
- Known for: Ćaciland Protest Camp

Miloš Pavlović (Serbian: Милош Павловић) is a Serbian student and political activist aligned with the ruling Serbian Progressive Party (SNS). He was one of the representatives of the Ćaciland Protest Camp which acted as an opposition to the student-led anti-corruption protests.

== Biography ==
Pavlović was born in Doboj, Republika Srpska, Bosnia and Herzegovina. His father Darko is a convicted drug trafficker, while his step father is the rector of the university in Doboj. He participated at the Alliance of Independent Social Democrats (SNSD) rallies in Republika Srpska.

Pavlović is a student at the Faculty of Medicine at the University of Belgrade.

Following the 2024 Novi Sad railway station canopy collapse and the start of the student-led anti-corruption protests, Pavlović emerged as a symbol of "counter-students" and the main representative of the Ćaciland Protest Camp which was formed by supporters of the Serbian Progressive Party (SNS), who call themselves "Students 2.0" or "students who want to study". Pavlović participated and gave speeches at SNS rallies and even appeared in company of the Serbian president Aleksandar Vučić, who called him "one of the best students of our university". In June 2025, Pavlović was physically attacked in New Belgrade. Pavlović sparked controversy in July 2026 after reports revealed that, as an unlicensed medical student, he examined patients in mobile clinics, drawing widespread allegations of legal and ethical violations.

Pavlović was a candidate on the SNS-led United Serbia electoral list for the snap parliamentary election scheduled for 25 October 2026 and was elected to the National Assembly.
