= Party for Democratic Action =

Political party in Serbia

Party for Democratic Action: Partia për Veprim Demokratik; Партија за демократско деловање
- Abbreviation: PVD, PDD
- President: Shaip Kamberi
- Founder: Riza Halimi
- Founded: 19 August 1990; 36 years ago
- Headquarters: Ramiza Sadiku 3, Preševo
- Ideology: Albanian minority interests
- National affiliation: Albanian Coalition
- Colours: Blue; Yellow
- National Assembly: 1 / 250

Website
- pvd-pbm.org

The Party for Democratic Action or Democratic Action Party (Albanian: Partia për Veprim Demokratik, abbr. PVD; Serbian: Партија за демократско деловање, romanised: Partija za demokratsko delovanje, abbr. PDD) is a regionalist political party in Serbia representing the Albanian minority of the Preševo Valley. Founded in 1990 by Riza Halimi, it has been led by Shaip Kamberi since 2018. The party has been represented in the National Assembly for most of the period since 1990, usually at the head of joint Albanian lists, most recently the Albanian Coalition, which won two seats in the 2026 parliamentary election.

== History ==
The PVD was founded on 19 August 1990 in the Preševo Valley by Riza Halimi, Selajdin Abdiu, Behlul Nasufi, Ramadan Ahmeti and Rexhep Hasani. Led by Halimi, it won one seat in the 1990 election, and again in 1993 and 1997 in joint lists with other Albanian parties, but did not take part in the 2000 and 2003 elections. From 2007 to 2012, it won one seat each time on the list of the Albanian Coalition of Preševo Valley.

Running alone, the PVD won two seats in the 2014 election, and one in 2016, when it was the only Albanian minority party on the ballot and its list was headed by Ardita Sinani. In October 2018, Shaip Kamberi was elected president of the party. In the 2020 election, the PVD ran on the joint "Albanian Democratic Alternative – United Valley" list with Alternative for Changes and other parties, which won three seats, following a campaign by Albania's foreign ministry to increase the participation of Preševo Valley Albanians in Serbian elections.

In the 2022 election, the PVD-led Albanian Coalition of Preševo Valley list initially fell short of a seat. After the Administrative Court annulled the results at a polling station in Veliki Trnovac and ordered a repeat vote, the list won enough votes to secure one seat for Kamberi; voting there was repeated four times before the fifth vote, on 30 June, passed without objections, and RIK confirmed the seat on 5 July 2022. In the 2023 election, Kamberi was re-elected on the list "The Political Struggle of the Albanians Continues – Shaip Kamberi".

For the 2026 snap parliamentary election, eight Albanian parties from Preševo, Bujanovac and Medveđa agreed in Pristina to run on a joint list, the Albanian Coalition, for the first time; Kamberi was its first candidate. The list won 27,683 votes (0.63%) and two seats, taken by Kamberi and Visar Mehmeti. Kamberi described the result as the product of "political unity", while Prime Minister of Kosovo Albin Kurti called it an "exceptional achievement".

== Electoral performance ==
=== Parliamentary elections ===
National Assembly
Year	Leader	Popular vote	% of popular vote	#	# of seats	Seat change	Coalition	Status	Ref.
1990	Riza Halimi	21,998	0.46%	17th	1 / 250	▲1	–	Opposition	
1992	Riza Halimi	17,172	0.39%	17th	0 / 250	▼1	–	Extra-parliamentary	
1993	Riza Halimi	29,342	0.71%	▲12th	1 / 250	▲1	PVD–PDS	Opposition	
1997	Riza Halimi	14,179	0.36%	▼14th	1 / 250	0	PVD–DPB	Opposition	
2000	Riza Halimi	Did not participate			0 / 250	▼1	–	Extra-parliamentary	–
2003	Riza Halimi	Did not participate			0 / 250	0	–	Extra-parliamentary	–
2007	Riza Halimi	16,973	0.43%	13th	1 / 250	▲1	KShLP	Opposition	
2008	Riza Halimi	16,801	0.41%	▲9th	1 / 250	0	KShLP	Opposition	
2012	Riza Halimi	13,384	0.36%	▼16th	1 / 250	0	KShLP	Opposition	
2014	Riza Halimi	24,301	0.70%	▲13th	2 / 250	▲1	–	Support	
2016	Riza Halimi	16,262	0.44%	▼15th	1 / 250	▼1	–	Support	
2020	Shaip Kamberi	26,437	0.85%	▲14th	3 / 250 (Note: Seats won by the electoral list led by the party.)	▲2	ADA	Opposition	
2022	Shaip Kamberi	10,165	0.28%	▼16th	1 / 250	▼2	KShLP	Opposition	
2023	Shaip Kamberi	13,486	0.36%	▲13th	1 / 250	0	PBASN	Opposition	
2026	Shaip Kamberi	27,683	0.63%	▲6th	2 / 250	▲1	KShLP	TBA	

== See also ==
- Albanians in Serbia
