= Ilija Srdanović =

Serbian physician (born 1970)

- Илија Срдановић
- Srdanović in 2026

Member of the National Assembly
- Incumbent
- Assumed office 17 November 2026

Personal details
- Born: 7 August 1970 (age 56) Novi Sad, SR Serbia, Yugoslavia
- Party: Independent
- Other political affiliations: Student List (2026–present)
- Education: University of Novi Sad; University of Belgrade (MMed)
- Profession: Cardiologist

Ilija Srdanović (Serbian: Илија Срдановић; born 7 August 1970) is a Serbian physician and university professor at the Faculty of Medicine of the University of Novi Sad. He also works as a cardiologist at the Clinic for Cardiology of the Institute for Cardiovascular Diseases of Vojvodina in Sremska Kamenica. He was the lead candidate for the winning Student List in the 2026 Serbian parliamentary election.

== Early life and education ==
Ilija Srdanović was born on 7 August 1970 in Novi Sad, Serbia, Yugoslavia. His paternal family is from Montenegro. He completed his primary and secondary education in Vrbas. Srdanović graduated from the Faculty of Medicine at the University of Novi Sad in 1995. He subsequently completed his residency in internal medicine in 2001, followed by a cardiology subspecialization in 2004. In 2010, he obtained his master's degree in internal medicine-cardiology from the Faculty of Medicine of the University of Belgrade. He completed his doctorial dissertation in the same field at the Faculty of Medicine in Novi Sad in 2012.

== Medical career ==
Srdanović has worked at the Clinic for Cardiology of the Institute for Cardiovascular Diseases of Vojvodina in Sremska Kamenica since 1997. He has been a professor of emergency medicine at the University of Novi Sad since 2018, earning the title of a full professor in 2025. Srdanović was an independent candidate in the 2026 Medical Chamber of Serbia elections. He was defeated by Miodrag Stanić.

== Political activity ==
Srdanović publicly supported the student-led anti-corruption protests in Serbia and had spoken at several student demonstrations. In September 2025, he alleged that the Serbian government had used chemical agents against demonstrators. Srdanović was revealed to be a candidate of the Student List for the 2026 Serbian parliamentary election in September 2026. On 14 September, when the Student List submitted their list, Srdanović was identified as its lead candidate. Following the announcement, pro-government tabloids published negative stories about Srdanović, alleging violence against women, and that he was previously affiliated with the Serbian Progressive Party. Srdanović declined an invitation to a televised debate extended by President Aleksandar Vučić.

== Political positions ==
As a healthcare professional, Srdanović has advocated for a healthcare system that "will be at service of citizens and based on equality for all patients". He has also supported decentralisation of the healthcare system. In an interview with the FoNet news agency, Srdanović said that his goal was building "a better Serbia, nothing else is important".

Srdanović maintains that Kosovo is an integral part of Serbia under the country's constitution and pledged to find the best solutions for Kosovo Serbs and promised not to abandon them. In the same interview, Srdanović stated that European Union integration is not a current focus or a priority for the students' list, adding that Serbia's immediate goal is "existential survival".
