= Shaip Kamberi =

Albanian politician

MP Shaip Kamberi
- Шаип Камбери; Šaip Kamberi
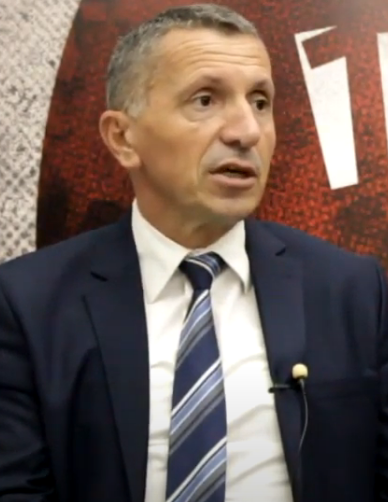

President of the Municipality of Bujanovac
- In office 2008–2012
- In office 2016–2020

Personal details
- Born: 15 October 1964 (age 62) Veliki Trnovac, SR Serbia, SFR Yugoslavia
- Party: Party for Democratic Action
- Education: University of Priština

Shaip Kamberi (Serbian Cyrillic: Шаип Камбери, romanized: Šaip Kamberi; born 15 October 1964) is a Serbian politician. An ethnic Albanian, he has led the Party for Democratic Action since 2018, and has been an MP since 2020, a role he previously held between 2014 and 2016.

Previously, he has served as the president of the Municipality of Bujanovac from 2008 to 2012 and from 2016 to 2020. He is the president of the Party for Democratic Action (PDD), an Albanian minority political party in Serbia.

== Early life and career ==
Kamberi was born in 1964 to an Albanian family in Veliki Trnovac which at the time was a part of the Socialist Federal Republic of Yugoslavia.

He completed middle and high school in Veliki Trnovac and Bujanovac and later he studied at the Faculty of Law at the University of Priština. He graduated in 1989.

From 2000 to 2008, he was the correspondent of a Kosovo daily paper "Zëri", while in 2011 he was a participant in the project of a study visit to the US Department of State (International Visitor's Program), which is implemented through the US Embassy in Belgrade. He was the founder of the NGO "Committee for Human Rights", which was established for monitoring, promotion and protection of human rights. He was the leader of the Human Rights Committee until 2008.

== Political career ==
During the period from 2002 to 2006 and 2006–2008, he served as a member of the Municipal Assembly of Bujanovac and he was also the head of the group of the Party for Democratic Action in the Bujanovac assembly.

As a PDD candidate in the local elections held in 2008, he was elected president of the Municipality of Bujanovac and he performed that function until 2012.

In the 2014 parliamentary elections, Shaip Kamberi was elected a member of the National Assembly, a position he held until 2016 when he got elected president of the Municipality of Bujanovac again.

In October 2018, Kamberi was elected president of the Party for Democratic Action.

In the 2020 parliamentary elections, Kamberi was elected once again a member of the National Assembly.
