= Nova srpska politička misao =

Serbian political magazine

- Editor-in-chief: Đorđe Vukadinović
- Categories: Political magazine
- Frequency: Quarterly
- Founded: 1994
- Country: Serbia
- Based in: Belgrade
- Language: Serbian
- Website: www.nspm.rs
- ISSN: 1450-7382

Nova srpska politička misao (NSPM; Serbian Cyrillic: Нова српска политичка мисао (НСПМ), lit. 'New Serbian political thought') is a publisher, quarterly magazine dealing with politics and policy studies, and independent pollster based in Belgrade, Serbia.

== History and profile ==
Founded in 1994 under the name Srpska politička misao, the magazine has typically attracted young, independent political scientists, philosophers, sociologists, psychologists, and economists who discuss topical, and sometimes controversial, political questions. Two years later, its publisher (the state-controlled Institute of Political Studies) dismissed the editorial board and all but banned the magazine. But soon after, Vreme, a Belgrade-based independent weekly, took it over, rehired the original editorial board, and relaunched it with "New" tacked on the title.

=== Editorial stance ===
Its editorial orientation has been described as conservative, nationalist, radical right, far-right, Eurosceptic, and pro-Russian.
