= Forward to Europe =

Parliamentary group in Serbia

Forward to Europe Правац Европа Pravac Evropa
- Abbreviation: PE
- Chairperson: Marinika Tepić
- Deputy Chairman: Pavle Grbović
- Founded: 1 August 2022
- Dissolved: 6 February 2024
- Preceded by: United for the Victory of Serbia
- National affiliation: Serbia Against Violence
- Colours: Orange

Website
- pravacevropa.rs

Forward to Europe (Serbian Cyrillic: Правац Европа, romanised: Pravac Evropa, abbr. PE), initially known as United (Serbian Cyrillic: Уједињени, romanised: Ujedinjeni), was a parliamentary group in the National Assembly of Serbia and City Assembly of Belgrade. The parliamentary groups were composed of parties that took part in the United for the Victory of Serbia (UZPS) coalition in the 2022 Serbian general election. In the National Assembly, the parliamentary group was headed by Marinika Tepić, while in the City Assembly of Belgrade, it was headed by Mila Popović.

== History ==
=== Formation ===
The United for the Victory of Serbia (UZPS) coalition, which included the Party of Freedom and Justice (SSP), Movement of Free Citizens (PSG), Movement for Reversal (PZP), United Trade Unions of Serbia "Sloga" (USS Sloga), and the Fatherland movement, took part in the 2022 general election. The coalition placed second, winning 38 seats in total. Shortly following the election, a series of disagreements came to light in the UZPS, which ultimately led to its dissolution. In May 2022, it was announced that the parties would continue their cooperation in the National Assembly and City Assembly of Belgrade.

Following the constitutive session of the 13th convocation of the National Assembly on 1 August, the United parliamentary group became the largest opposition parliamentary group. Borko Stefanović was nominated by the United parliamentary group as one of the seven candidates for the deputy president of the National Assembly. He was elected on 2 August.

=== Activity ===
The United parliamentary group in the City Assembly of Belgrade proposed to implement free public transport for high school and university students and war veterans in Belgrade, and to implement an anti-corruption committee. Additionally, it criticised the SNS-proposed budget for Belgrade. In October 2022, the parliamentary group filed a proposal for dismissal of mayor Aleksandar Šapić, citing alleged illegal legalisation of the extension of an apartment at Bežanija. Their proposal received support from the People's Party (Narodna), Democratic Party (DS), We Must (Moramo), and Dveri. The proposal failed after it only received support from 44 members of the City Assembly. The United group later became critical of the proposed budget, describing it as populistic. In February 2023, the United group criticised the decision to move the Belgrade Zoo to Ada Ciganlija.

In the National Assembly, it opposed the report on Kosovo that was submitted by SNS. Additionally, it proposed a new labour law; it claimed that the law would improve workers' rights. It voted against in the investiture vote for the third cabinet of Ana Brnabić on 28 October 2022.

Its name was changed to Forward to Europe in July 2023. The groups ceased to exist after the 2023 elections.

== Members ==
In the National Assembly, the Forward to Europe parliamentary group was headed by Marinika Tepić while Pavle Grbović served as deputy chairperson. In the City Assembly of Belgrade, Mila Popović served as its head. In December 2022, its parliamentary group in the National Assembly was reduced to 15 members after Dejan Bulatović departed from the parliamentary group.

Name	Leader	Main ideology	Political position	National Assembly	City Assembly of Belgrade
Party of Freedom and Justice (SSP)	Dragan Đilas	Social democracy	Centre-left	15 / 250	6 / 110
Movement of Free Citizens (PSG)	Pavle Grbović	Liberalism	Centre	3 / 250	3 / 110
United Trade Unions of Serbia "Sloga" (USS Sloga)	Željko Veselinović	Labourism	Left-wing	1 / 250	1 / 110
Movement for Reversal (PZP)	Janko Veselinović	Social democracy	Centre-left	1 / 250	1 / 110
Fatherland	Slaviša Ristić	Kosovo Serb minority politics		1 / 250	0 / 110
