= List of members of the National Assembly of Serbia, 2022–2024 =

This is a list of the 250 members of the 13th convocation of the National Assembly of Serbia, as well as a list of former members of this convocation.

The 13th convocation of the National Assembly was elected in the 2022 parliamentary election, and it first met on 1 August 2022.

== MNAs by party ==
Name		Leader	Founded	Ideology	Political position	National Assembly
Serbian Progressive Party; Српска напредна странка Srpska napredna stranka	SNS	Aleksandar Vučić	2008	Populism; Neoliberalism	Big tent	95 / 250
Socialist Party of Serbia; Социјалистичка партија Србије; Socijalistička partija Srbije	SPS	Ivica Dačić	1990	Social democracy Populism	Centre-left	22 / 250
People's Party; Народна странка Narodna stranka	NS	Vuk Jeremić	2017	Liberal conservatism Protectionism	Centre-right	12 / 250
Party of Freedom and Justice; Странка слободе и правде Stranka slobode i prave	SSP	Dragan Đilas	2019	Social democracy Social liberalism	Centre-left	11 / 250
Democratic Party; Демократска странка Demokratska stranka	DS	Zoran Lutovac	1990	Social democracy Social liberalism	Centre to centre-left	10 / 250
Serbian Party Oathkeepers; Српска странка Заветници; Srpska stranka zavetnici	SSZ	Milica Đurđević; Stamenkovski	2012	Ultranationalism; Social conservatism	Far-right	10 / 250
New Democratic Party of Serbia; Нова демократска странка Србије; Nova demokratska stranka Srbije	NDSS	Miloš Jovanović	1992	National conservatism Christian democracy	Right-wing	8 / 250
United Serbia; Јединствена Србија; Jedinstvena Srbija	JS	Dragan Marković	2004	Populism; National conservatism	Right-wing	8 / 250
Together; Заједно; Zajedno	Z	Collective leadership	2022	Green politics		8 / 250
Social Democratic Party of Serbia; Социјалдемократска партија Србије; Socijaldemokratska partija Srbije	SDPS	Rasim Ljajić	2008	Social democracy Pro-Europeanism	Centre-left	7 / 250
Serbian Movement Dveri; Српски покрет Двери; Srpski pokret Dveri	Dveri	Boško Obradović	1999	Serbian nationalism Right-wing populism	Right-wing	6 / 250
For the Kingdom of Serbia; За Краљевину Србију; Za Kraljevinu Srbiju	ZKS	Vojislav Mihailović	2022	Monarchism; National conservatism	Right-wing	6 / 250
Party of United Pensioners of Serbia; Партија уједињених пензионера Србије; Partija ujedinjenih penzionera Srbije	PUPS	Milan Krkobabić	2005	Pensioners' interests Social conservatism	Single-issue	6 / 250
Alliance of Vojvodina Hungarians; Савез војвођанских Мађара; Savez vojvođanskih Mađara	SVM; VMSZ	István Pásztor	1994	Hungarian minority interests Regionalism	Centre-right	5 / 250
Do not let Belgrade drown Не давимо Београд; Ne davimo Beograd	NDB	Dobrica Veselinović	2015	Green politics		5 / 250
Movement for the Restoration of the Kingdom of Serbia; Покрет за обнову Краљевине Србије; Pokret za obnovu Kraljevine Srbije	POKS	Žika Gojković	2017	Monarchism; National conservatism	Right-wing	4 / 250
Justice and Reconciliation Party; Странка правде и помирења Stranka pravde i pomirenja	SPP	Usame Zukorlić	2010	Bosniak minority interests Islamism		2 / 250
Movement of Free Citizens; Покрет слободних грађана Pokret slobodnih građana	PSG	Pavle Grbović	2017	Liberalism; Social liberalism	Centre	3 / 250
Strength of Serbia Movement; Покрет снага Србије; Pokret snaga Srbije	PSS	Bogoljub Karić	2004	Conservatism; Economic liberalism	Centre-right	3 / 250
Movement of Socialists; Покрет социјалиста Pokret socijalista	PS	Aleksandar Vulin	2008	Left-wing nationalism Social conservatism	Syncretic	2 / 250
Party of Democratic Action of Sandžak; Странка демократске акције Санџака; Stranka demokratske akcije Sandžaka	SDA S	Sulejman Ugljanin	1990	Bosniak minority interests Autonomism	Centre-right to right-wing	3 / 250
Serbian People's Party; Српска народна партија Srpska narodna partija	SNP	Nenad Popović	2014	National conservatism Right-wing populism	Right-wing	2 / 250
Serbian Renewal Movement; Српски покрет обнове Srpski pokret obnove	SPO	Vuk Drašković	1990	Liberalism; Monarchism	Centre-right	2 / 250
Better Serbia; Боља Србија; Bolja Srbija	BS	Dragan Jovanović	2017	National conservatism Agrarianism	Right-wing	1 / 250
Democratic Alliance of Croats in Vojvodina; Демократски савез Хрвата у Војводини; Demokratski savez Hrvata u Vojvodini	DSHV	Tomislav Žigmanov	1990	Croat minority interests Autonomism		1 / 250
Greens of Serbia; Зелени Србије; Zeleni Srbije	ZS	Ivan Karić	2007	Green politics Social democracy	Centre-left	1 / 250
Movement for Reversal; Покрет за преокрет Pokret za preokret	PZP	Janko Veselinović	2015	Social democracy	Centre-left	1 / 250
Party for Democratic Action; Партија за демократско деловање Partija za demokratsko delovanje	PVD/PDD	Shaip Kamberi	1990	Albanian minority interests	Centre-right	1 / 250
People's Peasant Party; Народна сељачка странка Narodna seljačka stranka	NSS	Marijan Rističević	1990	Agrarianism; Conservatism	Right-wing	1 / 250
Together for Vojvodina; Заједно за Војводину; Zajedno za Vojvodinu	ZZS	Olena Papuga	2022	Social democracy Autonomism	Centre-left	1 / 250
United Peasant Party; Уједињена сељачка странка Ujedinjena seljačka stranka	USS	Milija Miletić	1990	Agrarianism		1 / 250
United Trade Unions of Serbia "Sloga"; Уједињени синдикати Србије "Слога"; Ujedinjeni sindikati Srbije "Sloga"	USS Sloga	Željko Veselinović	2008	Syndicalism; Democratic socialism	Left-wing	1 / 250

== List of members of the 13th National Assembly ==
Name	Parliamentary group	Political Party or Movement	Residence	Year of birth	Notes
Dragoljub Acković	Together We Can Do Everything	Serbian Progressive Party	Belgrade	1952	
Stefan Adžić	Together We Can Do Everything	Serbian Progressive Party	Kraljevo	1996	
Natan Albahari	United	Movement of Free Citizens	Belgrade	1986	
Miroslav Aleksić	People's Party	People's Party	Trstenik	1978	President of the parliamentary group
Zagorka Aleksić	United Serbia	United Serbia	Belgrade	1987	
Ivan Antić	Together We Can Do Everything	Serbian Progressive Party	Novi Sad	1978	
Veroljub Arsić	Together We Can Do Everything	Serbian Progressive Party	Požarevac	1969	
Marko Atlagić	Together We Can Do Everything	Serbian Progressive Party	Belgrade	1949	
Muamer Bačevac	Social Democratic Party of Serbia	Social Democratic Party of Serbia	Novi Pazar	1977	Vice-president of the parliamentary group
Živan Bajić	Together We Can Do Everything	Serbian Progressive Party	Šabac	1982	
Nebojša Bakarec	Together We Can Do Everything	Serbian Progressive Party	Belgrade	1963	
Rade Basta	United Serbia	United Serbia	Belgrade	1979	
Igor Bečić	Together We Can Do Everything	Serbian Progressive Party	Novi Sad	1971	
Jelena Begović	Together We Can Do Everything	Serbian Progressive Party	Belgrade	1970	
Ana Beloica Martać	Together We Can Do Everything	Serbian Progressive Party	Raška	1992	
Jelena Bogdanović	NADA	For the Kingdom of Serbia	Belgrade	1988	
Marko Bogdanović	Together We Can Do Everything	Serbian Progressive Party	Belgrade	1981	
Nataša Bogunović	Ivica Dačić – Socialist Party of Serbia	Socialist Party of Serbia	Belgrade	1973	
Milorad Bojović	Together We Can Do Everything	Serbian Progressive Party	Novi Sad	1973	
Miloratka Bojović	NADA	New Democratic Party of Serbia	Smederevo	1969	
Nikola Bokan	Together We Can Do Everything	Serbian Progressive Party	Novi Sad	1999	
Sandra Božić	Together We Can Do Everything	Serbian Progressive Party	Pančevo	1979	
Igor Braunović	Ivica Dačić – Socialist Party of Serbia	Socialist Party of Serbia	Belgrade	1975	
Žika Bujuklić	Together We Can Do Everything	Serbian Progressive Party	Belgrade	1952	
Bojana Bukumirović	Serbian Party Oathkeepers	Serbian Party Oathkeepers	Belgrade	1981	
Dejan Bulatović	United	Party of Freedom and Justice	Šid	1975	
Slaviša Bulatović	Together We Can Do Everything	Serbian Progressive Party	Vranje	1975	
Tatjana Pašić	United	Party of Freedom and Justice	Belgrade	1964	

== List of former members of the 13th National Assembly ==
Name	Political Party or Movement	Term of Office	Year of birth	Cause of departure
Ana Brnabić	Serbian Progressive Party	1 August 2022 – 2 August 2022	1975	Resignation
Božidar Delić	NADA	1 August 2022 – 23 August 2022	1956	Death
Marija Zdravković	Serbian Progressive Party	1 August 2022 – 25 October 2022	1973	Resignation
