= Citizens' Bloc 381 =

Citizens' Bloc 381 Грађански блок 381 Građanski blok 381
- President: Position vacant
- Leaders: Sergej Trifunović; Jenő Maglai; Saša Milenić; Jasminko Hadžisalihović
- Founder: Saša Janković
- Founded: 21 August 2018
- Dissolved: December 2018
- Headquarters: Belgrade
- Ideology: Liberalism; Social democracy Pro-Europeanism

The Citizens' Bloc 381 (Serbian: Грађански блок 381 / Građanski blok 381) was a coalition of political parties in Serbia. The Bloc was founded by Saša Janković in 2018.

== Name ==
According to Janković, "381" was used as part of the name of the Bloc because it represents the country calling code of Serbia, which is +381.

== Political program ==
Some of the key elements of the program of the Citizens' Bloc 381 were:

- Personal freedom, civic society and democracy
- Accession of Serbia to the European Union
- Market economy and social justice
- Humane security, zero tolerance for criminal and corruption
- Creation of conditions for peaceful, democratic and fair elections

== Members ==
Name		Logo	Abbr.	Leader	Ideology	Political position	Deputies
1	Movement of Free Citizens; Покрет слободних грађана / Pokret slobodnih građana		PSG	Sergej Trifunović	Social democracy Social liberalism Pro-Europeanism	Centre-left	0 / 250
2	Hungarian Movement; Мађарски покрет / Mađarski pokret		MP	Jenő Maglai			0 / 250
3	Šumadija Region; Шумадијска регија / Šumadijska regija		ŠR	Saša Milenić			0 / 250
4	Coalition Tolerance; Коалиција Толеранција / Koalicija Tolerancija		KT	Jasminko Hadžisalihović			0 / 250

=== Former members ===
On 5 November 2018, the Green Ecological Party – The Greens left the Bloc.

Name		Logo	Abbr.	Leader	Ideology	Political position	Deputies
1	Green Ecological Party – The Greens; Зелена еколошка партија – Зелени / Zelena Ekološka Partija – Zeleni		ZEPZ	Dejan Bulatović	Green politics	Centre-left	0 / 250
