= Vladeta Janković =

Serbian politician

- Владета Јанковић
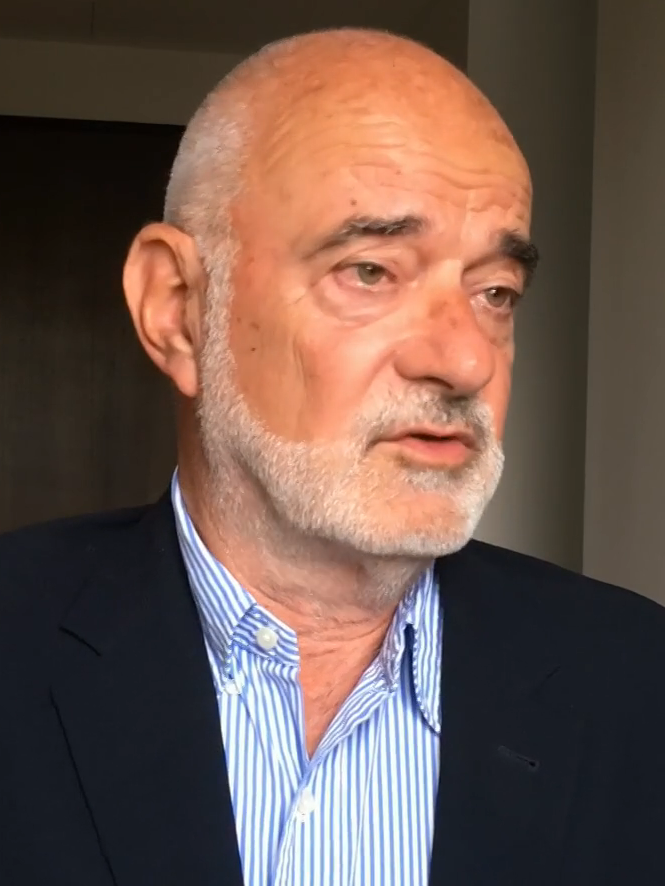
- Janković in 2018

Member of the National Assembly of the Republic of Serbia
- In office 1 August 2022 – 6 February 2024

President of the National Assembly of Serbia
- Acting
- In office 1 August 2022 – 2 August 2022
- Preceded by: Ivica Dačić
- Succeeded by: Vladimir Orlić

Ambassador of Serbia to the Holy See
- In office 2008–2012
- President: Boris Tadić; Tomislav Nikolić
- Preceded by: Darko Tanasković
- Succeeded by: Mirko Jelić

Ambassador of FR Yugoslavia to the United Kingdom
- In office 2001–2004
- President: Vojislav Koštunica; Svetozar Marović
- Preceded by: Miloš Radulović
- Succeeded by: Dragiša Burzan

Personal details
- Born: 1 September 1940 (age 86) Belgrade, Kingdom of Yugoslavia
- Party: DS (1990–1992); DSS (1992–2014); Independent (2014–present)
- Other political affiliations: UZPS (2022)
- Education: University of Belgrade

Vladeta Janković (Serbian Cyrillic: Владета Јанковић; born 1 September 1940) is a Serbian university professor, diplomat and politician. A former member of the Democratic Party of Serbia (DSS), Janković previously served as the Yugoslav ambassador to the United Kingdom from 2001 to 2004 and the Serbian ambassador to the Holy See from 2008 to 2012.

Janković left DSS in 2014 after its former president, Vojislav Koštunica, announced that he was leaving the party, leading Janković to retire from politics. His eight-year break from politics ended in January 2022 when the United for the Victory of Serbia (UZPS) opposition coalition named Janković as their ballot carrier and candidate for Mayor of Belgrade at the City Assembly election. Following the election, he was elected as a member of the National Assembly. Janković served as the acting president of the National Assembly of Serbia from 1 to 2 August 2022. Additionally, Janković is a literary scholar, university professor, writer, and a former diplomat.

== Early life and career ==
Vladeta Janković was born on 1 September 1940 in Belgrade, Kingdom of Yugoslavia. His father Dragoslav Janković was a left-wing university professor and his mother Bosiljka Janković (née Kokanović) was a librarian. His father was from Vranje, while his mother was of Bosnian Serb, Croatian Serb and Aromanian heritage. One of his maternal great-grandfathers was a member of Young Bosnia.

He graduated from a gymnasium in Belgrade in 1959. Janković enrolled at the University of Belgrade Faculty of Philology, where he studied world literature and graduated in 1964. He finished his master's degree in 1967, and defended his doctoral thesis in 1975 titled "Menander's Characters and European Drama". At the same department, he went from assistant trainee to full professor and department head.

For years, he collaborated with Radio Television Belgrade as the author of cultural and historical programs for youth. He has been a lecturer in the United States, England, the Netherlands and Greece.

== Political and diplomatic career ==
He entered politics in the early 1990s as a member of the Main Board of the Democratic Party (DS). Following the split in DS, Janković became one of the founders of the Democratic Party of Serbia (DSS). He served as a member of the National Assembly of Serbia and the Federal Assembly of FR Yugoslavia.

Following the overthrow of Slobodan Milošević, he was appointed Yugoslav Ambassador to the United Kingdom in 2001. He later called his service in the UK "extremely hard and stressful". In 2004, he was named chief foreign policy adviser to the prime minister of Serbia, Vojislav Koštunica. In 2005, he was elected vice president of the Democratic Party of Serbia (DSS). He was Serbia's Ambassador to the Holy See from February 2008 to August 2012.

He left the Democratic Party of Serbia on 14 October 2014 shortly after the party's founder and long term president, Vojislav Koštunica, announced his departure from the party.

In late January 2022, the Party of Freedom and Justice (SSP), the People's Party (NS), the Democratic Party and the Movement of Free Citizens (PSG) proposed Janković as their ballot carrier and candidate for Mayor of Belgrade at the upcoming Belgrade City Assembly election, with Janković accepting the offer on 31 January, stating that he is "optimistic" regarding the upcoming election. After being officially presented by the United for the Victory of Serbia (UZPS) coalition as their candidate for Mayor of Belgrade on 2 February, Janković stated that, in case he is elected mayor, "everything in Belgrade will be transparent and that every detail about the contracts will be known". Janković became father of the National Assembly in August 2022.

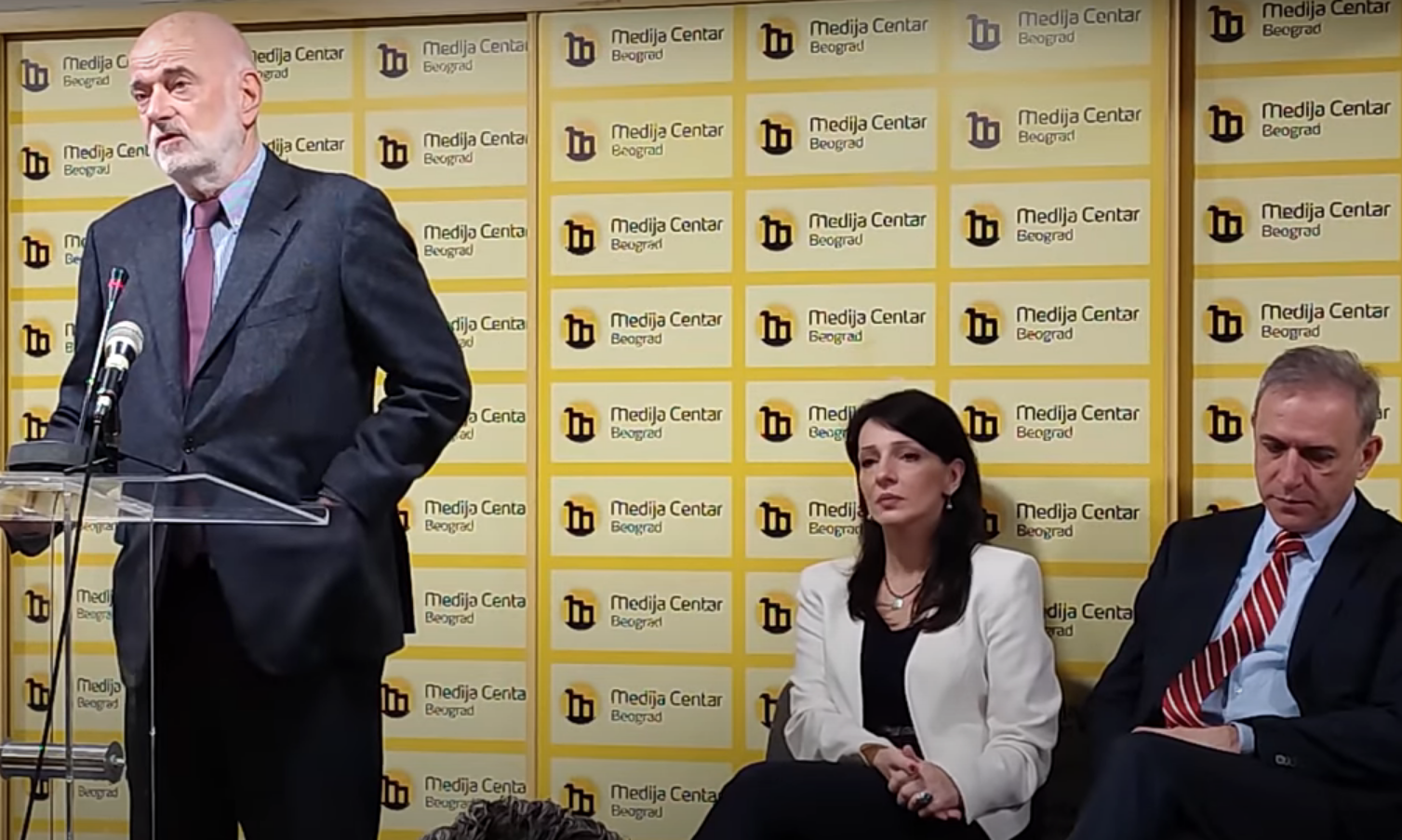
Janković, Marinika Tepić and Zdravko Ponoš, the representatives of the United for the Victory of Serbia coalition on 2 February 2022

== Political positions ==
Janković has been described as a conservative and right-wing politician. He opposes the rule of the Serbian Progressive Party (SNS) and its leader Aleksandar Vučić accusing him that he behaves like "bullies in schoolyards who are intimidating and blackmailing those weaker than them in order to present themselves as protectors and saviors".

=== Foreign views ===
Janković believes that the accession of Serbia to the European Union is an "unrealistic project" and that the "EU will cease to exist before Serbia becomes it's member". In 2014, Janković stated that "it should be given up on the idea that Serbia will collapse if it does not join the EU, because it is not Switzerland."

=== Kosovo question ===
Janković has repeatedly stated that Kosovo's independence is unacceptable and inadmissible for him, sharply criticizing Vučić's agreements with Kosovo, European Union and the United States, while also opposing the participation of Kosovo Serbs in the elections organized by the authorities of Kosovo. In January 2021, Janković stated that Kosovo "de facto, does not belong to us and everyone can see it, but de jure, according to international law, it certainly belongs to us." In September 2021, he stated that serious armed confrontation will not take place while NATO troops are stationed in Kosovo.

== Personal life ==
Janković is married to lawyer Slavka (née Srdić), with whom he has a son Uroš and daughter Mara.

== Orders ==
Award or decoration	Country
Order of the Star of Italian Solidarity	Italy
Order of Pope Pius IX	Holy See

== Selected works ==
- Poetska funkcija kovanica Laze Kostića (The Poetic Function of Laza Kostić's Coins), Belgrade 1969.
- Menandrovi likovi i evropska drama (Menander's Characters and European Drama), SANU, Belgrade 1978.
- Terencije: Komedije (prevod, komentar, predgovor), Belgrade 1978.
- Petrijin venac Dragoslava Mihailovića (Petrija's Wreath by Dragoslav Mihailović), Zavod za udžbenike i nastavna sredstva, Belgrade 1985.
- Nasmejanja životinja: o antičkoj komediji (Smiling Animal: About Ancient Comedy), Književna zajednica Novog Sada, Novi Sad 1987.
- Hrosvita: Drame (prevod, komentar i predgovor), Latina et Graeca, Zagreb 1988.
- Imenik klasične starine, Belgrade 1992
- Mitovi i legende: judaizam, hrišćanstvo, islam (Myths and Legends: Judaism, Christianity, Islam), Srpska književna zadruga, Belgrade 1996.
- Beočug, Srpska književna zadruga, Belgrade 2011.
- Antičke izreke (Ancient proverbs), Laguna, Belgrade 2018.
- Latinski glosar (Latin glossary), Laguna, Belgrade 2021.
