= Janko Veselinović =

Janko Veselinović is the name of:

- Janko Veselinović (writer) (1862-1905)
- Janko Veselinović (lawyer) (born 1965)
