= Dejan Bulatović =

Serbian politician (born 1975)

- Дејан Булатовић
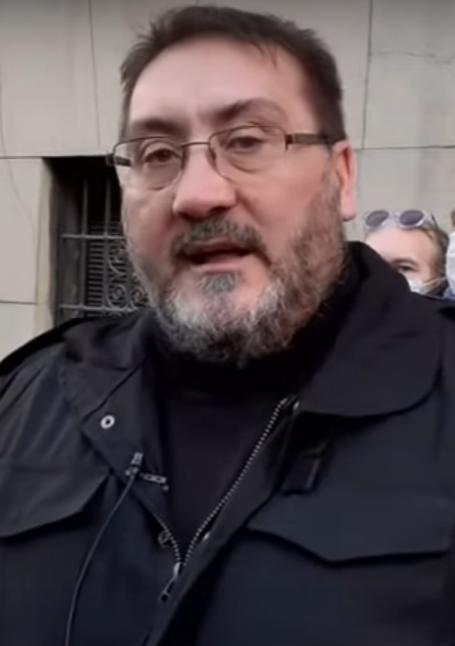
- Bulatović in 2020

Member of the National Assembly
- Incumbent
- Assumed office 1 August 2022

Personal details
- Born: 8 February 1975 (age 51) Šid, SAP Vojvodina, SR Serbia, SFR Yugoslavia
- Party: Independent (since 2022)
- Other political affiliations: SPO (1990s–1997); DHSS (1997–2000); ZEP–Zeleni (2013–2019); SSP (2019–2022)
- Occupation: Politician, farmer

Dejan Bulatović (Serbian: Дејан Булатовић; born 8 February 1975) is a Serbian politician who has been a member of the National Assembly since 2022.

He received international attention during the 1996–1997 protests in Serbia after he was arrested for carrying a puppet of Slobodan Milošević dressed in prison clothes; reports that he had been beaten by the authorities were covered by major newspapers worldwide. Bulatović later became a local councillor in his home municipality of Šid and led the Green Ecological Party – The Greens (ZEP–Zeleni), which was reorganised as the Party of Freedom and Justice (SSP) in 2019. He was a vice-president of the SSP until he left the party in December 2022.

Although he had been a critic of Aleksandar Vučić and the Serbian Progressive Party (SNS), he became a supporter of the government after leaving the SSP. In January 2023 he founded the Alliance of Social Democrats (Savez socijaldemokrata, SSD), an association of citizens. He was re-elected to the National Assembly on the SNS-led lists in the 2023 and 2026 parliamentary elections.

== Early life and private career ==
Bulatović was born in Šid, in what was then the Socialist Autonomous Province of Vojvodina in the Socialist Republic of Serbia, Socialist Federal Republic of Yugoslavia. During the 1996 protests, he was identified as a student and a factory worker. He is now active in agriculture and goat and sheep breeding.

== Political career ==
=== 1990s–2000s ===
Bulatović joined the Serbian Renewal Movement (Srpski pokret obnove, SPO) in the 1990s and took part in the protests against electoral fraud that followed the 1996 local elections. At a Belgrade protest on 7 December 1996, he was one of a number of students who carried an effigy of the authoritarian Serbian president Slobodan Milošević wearing prison clothes and a ball and chain. For this, he was arrested on charges of creating a public disturbance; the media outlet B92 reported that he had been badly beaten, and the opposition coalition Zajedno (which included the SPO) said that he had suffered severe head and chest wounds. His mother was able to visit him in jail and reported that he was being kept in an unheated room and was at risk of developing pneumonia.

Bulatović's arrest was covered by newspapers such as The New York Times, The Washington Post and The Guardian. His treatment by the authorities prompted new protests against Milošević's government on 9 December; a student group issued the statement, "Must we bow our heads and take all of this? Tomorrow it could be one of us."

The Serbian authorities denied that Bulatović had been mistreated and issued a statement saying that he "did not have any objections to the way he was treated". Sentenced to twenty-five days in jail, he was released early and took part in further anti-Milošević rallies, including in Belgrade on 31 December. He said that he was again beaten by police on 17 January 1997, after he was recognised in a crowd.

In November 1998, Bulatović's arrest and mistreatment were mentioned in an Amnesty International report on human rights conditions in the Federal Republic of Yugoslavia.

Bulatović remained in Belgrade after the 1996–1997 protests. When the Zajedno coalition broke up in late 1997, he took part in further citizen actions in the city. He also left the SPO at that time and joined the Christian Democratic Party of Serbia (Demohrišćanska stranka Srbije, DHSS).

Milošević was defeated in the 2000 Yugoslavian general election and fell from power on 5 October 2000. Nine days later, Bulatović was again arrested and reportedly beaten by police officers who demanded that he tell them where weapons taken from a Belgrade police station were. He said that he knew nothing about the weapons and that he planned to file charges against the officers. He left Serbia for France on 5 November 2000. In a 2002 interview with the SPO's journal Srpska reč, he said that some leaders of the Democratic Opposition of Serbia (Demokratska opozicija Srbije, DOS), the coalition that had overthrown Milošević, had "continued on the same path that Milošević had trodden during his dictatorship". He accused Zoran Đinđić of "privatiz[ing] a mafia-controlled Serbia" and said that "Đinđić's thugs" had beaten him on 15 October 2000. Bulatović has also said that he left Serbia after an encounter with the paramilitary commander Milorad Ulemek, also known as Legija. While living in Paris, he founded the Movement for a New Serbia (Pokret za novu Srbiju, PZNS).

=== Return to Serbia and local politics ===
Bulatović returned to Serbia on the day that Legija was arrested. He settled in Šid and founded the Movement for the Protection and Nurturing of the Bosut River, which among other things opposed illegal fishing. In the 2012 Serbian local elections, he was elected to the Šid municipal assembly as the candidate of his "Bosut Movement" on the electoral list of the Democratic Party (Demokratska stranka, DS). In 2014, he became deputy president (i.e., deputy speaker) of the municipal assembly. He was fourth on another DS-led list in the 2016 local elections and was re-elected when the list won six seats. Because of an opposition boycott, he did not stand for re-election in 2020.

Bulatović joined the ZEP–Zeleni in 2013 and became its leader in 2015. The party took part in the 2016 Vojvodina provincial election on the DS's electoral list, on which Bulatović was seventeenth; the list won only ten seats and he was not elected.

The ZEP–Zeleni later formed an alliance with the Greens of Serbia (Zeleni Srbije, ZS) known as the United Green Front. The alliance fell apart before the 2017 presidential election, when Bulatović objected to its decision to support Aleksandar Vučić's candidacy. He then brought the ZEP–Zeleni into an association with the Movement of Free Citizens (Pokret slobodnih građana, PSG) and the Citizens' Bloc 381 coalition. This affiliation was also short-lived; he withdrew the party from the 381 coalition in November 2018, citing irreconcilable differences with another party in the movement.

=== Vice-president of the Party of Freedom and Justice ===
In early 2019, Bulatović led the ZEP–Zeleni into an alliance with Dragan Đilas's political movement. He allowed his party to be reorganised as the Party of Freedom and Justice under Đilas's leadership, which spared Đilas the process of registering a new party, and was chosen as one of its vice-presidents.

The SSP contested the 2022 Serbian parliamentary election as part of the United for the Victory of Serbia (Ujedinjeni za pobedu Srbije, UZPS) coalition, and Bulatović was eleventh on the coalition's electoral list. He was sworn in as an MP on 1 August 2022.

=== Alliance of Social Democrats and cooperation with the SNS ===
Bulatović left the SSP in December 2022, shortly after which he claimed that Marinika Tepić had lobbied for the SNS. In January 2023 he met SNS ministers, including Aleksandar Martinović and Irena Vujović, and agreed to cooperate with Vujović's Ministry of Environmental Protection.

On 28 January 2023, at a founding session in Morović, Bulatović founded the Alliance of Social Democrats as an association of citizens and became its president. Many of those present were former members of the SSP. He said that the association would set up local branches across Serbia and that he expected it to become a political party. He became a supporter of Aleksandar Vučić and the government, and a critic of the opposition. He joined the SNS parliamentary group and was re-elected in the 2023 parliamentary election on the SNS-led "Aleksandar Vučić – Serbia Must Not Stop" list.

In November 2024, the SSP accused Bulatović of having announced and coordinated in advance the departure of two MPs from its parliamentary group.

=== 2026 parliamentary election ===
In the 2026 snap parliamentary election, Bulatović was 51st on the SNS-led "Aleksandar Vučić – United Serbia" list. The list won 103 seats, and he was re-elected. His mandate was confirmed on 17 November 2026, and he is a member of the "Aleksandar Vučić – Serbia Is Winning" parliamentary group in the 15th National Assembly.
