= Saša Milenić =

Serbian politician

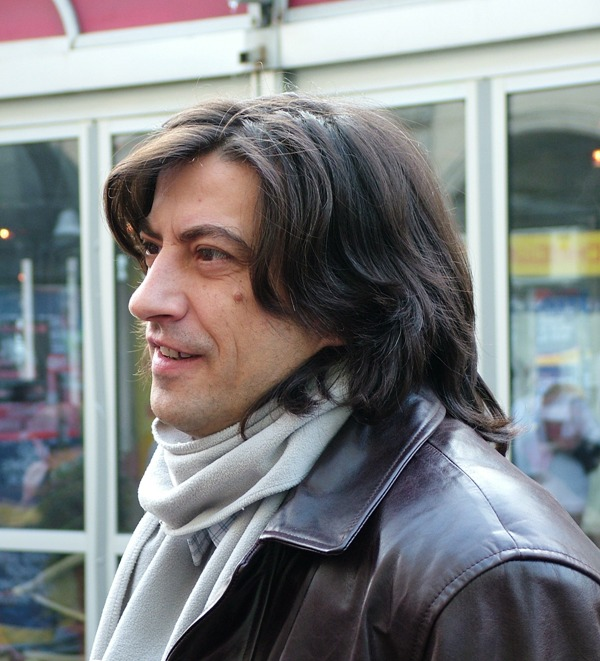
Milenić in 2005

Saša Milenić (Serbian Cyrillic: Саша Миленић; born 29 September 1967) is a politician in Serbia. A resident of Kragujevac, he was for many years a close ally of longtime mayor Veroljub Stevanović and a member of the latter's Together for Šumadija (Zajedno za Šumadiju) party. He also served in the National Assembly of Serbia for most of the period from 2008 to 2014.

Milenić later broke with Stevanović and became a member of the Movement of Free Citizens (Pokret slobodnih građana, PSG) and the leader of the Association of the Šumadija Region, which held collective membership in the PSG. He announced his withdrawal from politics in early 2020.

== Early life and career ==
Milenić was born in Foča, in what was then the Socialist Republic of Bosnia and Herzegovina in the Socialist Federal Republic of Yugoslavia. He is a graduate of the University of Belgrade Faculty of Philosophy and a teacher at First Kragujevac High School. He has published four books of poetry and essays.

== Politician ==
=== Early years ===
Milenić became politically active in 1996 as a member of the Zajedno (Together) coalition, an unstable alliance of political parties opposed to Slobodan Milošević's administration. The Zajendo name ceased to be used in most municipalities after 1997, but it remained as the name of Stevanović's local political movement in Kragujevac for many years thereafter. Milenić was a prominent member of this organization.

At the republic level, both Stevanović and Milenić were initially members of the Serbian Renewal Movement (Srpski pokret obnove, SPO). Milenić appeared on the SPO's electoral list in the 2000 Serbian parliamentary election; the list did not cross the threshold to win representation in the assembly.

The SPO formed an alliance with New Serbia (Nova Srbija, NS) for the 2003 Serbian parliamentary election. Milenić appeared in the thirty-eighth position on their combined list, which won twenty-two mandates. From 2000 to 2011, parliamentary mandates in Serbia were awarded at the discretion of the sponsoring parties and coalitions, and it was common practice for seats to be assigned out of numerical order; the SPO could have selected Milenić as a member of its assembly delegation, but it ultimately did not. Following local elections in 2004, Milenić became the deputy mayor of Kragujevac, a position he held for the next four years.

The SPO experienced a serious split in 2005, and both Stevanović and Milenić joined a breakaway group called the Serbian Democratic Renewal Movement (Srpski Demokratski Pokret Obnove, SDPO). The new party contested the 2007 Serbian parliamentary election on an electoral list led by New Serbia and the Democratic Party of Serbia (Demokratska stranka Srbije, DSS). Milenić was included on the list, which won forty-seven seats; he was once again not selected for a mandate.

=== Parliamentarian and president of the city assembly ===
Stevanović and Milenić affiliated with the G17 Plus alliance following the 2007 election. This alliance participated in the 2008 Serbian parliamentary election as part of the For a European Serbia list led by the Democratic Party (Demokratska stranka, DS). The list won 102 mandates, and on this occasion both Stevanović and Milenić were chosen to represent their party in the assembly. The DS and its allies formed a coalition government after the election, and Stevanović and Milenić served as supporters of the ministry.

Milenić also received the third position on the Zajedno list in the 2008 Serbian local elections, which were held concurrently with the parliamentary election. The list won a plurality victory with forty-one out of eighty-seven seats. Milenić was selected for a mandate in the local assembly and was subsequently chosen as its president (i.e., speaker).

In 2009, Stevanović launched Together for Šumadija as a new political party at the republic level; Milenić was a member. Despite working as a separate entity, the new party maintained an alliance with G17 Plus. Both Stevanović and Milenić resigned from the national assembly in September 2011, due to a determination that changes in Serbian law had made their functions in government at the municipal level incompatible with serving in the legislature. (It was later clarified that serving as president of a local assembly did not create a conflict of interest and that parliamentarians could hold this role on a concurrent basis.)

Serbia's electoral laws were changed in 2011, such that mandates were awarded to candidates on successful lists in numerical order. G17 Plus and Together for Šumadija both joined the United Regions of Serbia coalition (Ujedinjeni regioni Srbije, URS) for the 2012 Serbian parliamentary election; Milenić received the tenth position on the coalition's list and was elected to a second term when the list won sixteen mandates. The URS initially participated in a new coalition government led by the Serbian Progressive Party and the Socialist Party of Serbia following the election; in 2013, however, it moved into opposition. In the same year, the various constituent groups of the URS merged into a single united party.

Milenić was re-elected to another term in the Kragujevac assembly in the 2012 local elections; he received the fourth position on the Zajedno list and was re-elected when the list won thirty-seven mandates. He was selected for another term as president of the assembly and served in this role until 2014, when the Serbian Progressive Party and its allies ousted Stevanović as mayor and formed a new local administration.

Milenić was a substitute member of the Parliamentary Assembly of the Council of Europe (PACE) from 21 January 2013 to 22 May 2014.

=== Since 2014 ===
Milenić was promoted to the second position on the URS's list in the 2014 Serbian parliamentary election, but the list did not cross the threshold to win representation in the assembly. The URS subsequently dissolved, and Together for Šumadija was re-established at the republic level. For the 2016 Serbian parliamentary election, the party joined a coalition led by the DS. Milenić received the twenty-sixth list position and was not returned when the list won only sixteen seats. He again appeared in the fourth position on the Zajedno list in the 2016 local elections and was elected for another term when the list won twenty-four mandates. The Progressive Party and its allies won the local election, and Milenić served in opposition.

Milenić left Together for Šumadija in 2017, saying that it had not existed as a functional political organization for some time. He joined the Movement of Free Citizens on that party's founding in the same year. In August 2019, he argued that the PSG's decision on boycotting the next Serbian parliamentary election should be made openly by the entire party rather than by its leadership alone.

The Association of the Šumadija Region decided in early 2020 to boycott the upcoming elections in Serbia. Milenić, who disagreed with this decision, resigned as leader of the movement and announced his withdrawal from politics. He has since become a commentator on political matters in the Serbian media.
