= Marko Atlagić =

Serbian politician and historian (1949)

- Марко Атлагић
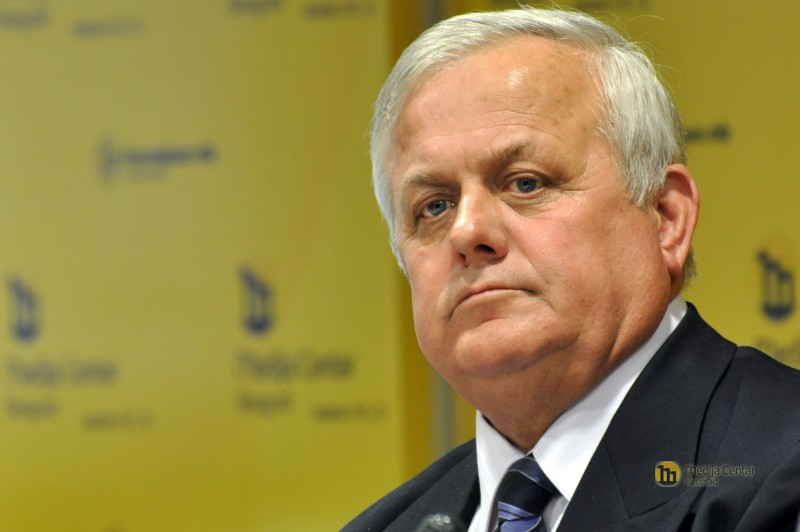
- Atlagić at a conference in 2011
- Born: 30 April 1949 (age 77); Ostrovica, PR Croatia, FPR Yugoslavia
- Education: University of Zadar
- Occupations: Politician, historian
- Political party: SKJ (until 1990); SSH (1990-1991); SRS RSK (1991-1997); SRS (1997-2008); SNS (2008-present)

Marko Atlagić (Serbian Cyrillic: Марко Атлагић; born 30 April 1949) is a Serbian politician and historian. He is one of the leaders of the Serbian Progressive Party (SNS) and Head of the Historical Department at the Faculty of Philosophy at the University of Priština in North Mitrovica, with auxiliary historical sciences as his preferred field. During his tenure in the National Assembly, he was known for making derogatory remarks on political opponents.

== Eucation and work ==
Born in Ostrovica, PR Croatia, FPR Yugoslavia, Atlagić finished primary school and high school in his hometown and in Benkovac. He later graduated from the Faculty of Philosophy at the University of Zadar, where in 1981 he received his master's degree in history. His professional biography states that he received his PhD from the University of Priština in modern-day Kosovo (later headquartered in Kosovska Mitrovica) in 1996. The accuracy of this information has been questioned, as his official biography states that he earned his PhD during a period when borders and roads were blocked due to the Yugoslav wars, while he was also holding political office. There is no record of his doctoral thesis in the university’s catalog, and he has not been able to publicly produce it.

=== Scientific works ===
He reportedly published 8 books and 150 scientific papers. However, in 2022 it was revealed that at the time there was no available list of his works on Google Scholar and ORCID; Scopus listed one work, meanwhile SCI listed 29, out of which 14 were published in Zbornik radova by the institute of the same University of Priština where he works as a professor, and 12 were in journal Baština where he is a member of the editorial board.

Some of his works on heraldry and vexillology were critically reviewed by SANU academic historian Slavko Gavrilović, and heraldist Dragomir Acović, who deemed it as scientifically worthless due to its falsifications, false references, lack of expertise, exceptional claims, as well as low mastery of language and style.

== Politics ==
=== 1990s ===
As a member of the League of Communists of Yugoslavia, he participated at the last convened 14th Congress of the League of Communists of Yugoslavia. In the early 1990s, after Croatia proclaimed its independence from SFRJ, as a member of the Socialist Party of Croatia he was on the List of members of the Sabor, 1990–1992 as one of many representatives of the Council of Municipalities. However, he soon joined the Serb nationalist movement in Croatia, which sought to form a separate state from Croatia. In 1991, he participated in a pan-Serbian meeting of the SAO Kninska Krajina in Knin as one of its speakers.

As part of ultra-nationalist the "Serbian Radical Party for Republic of Srpska Krajina" (SRS for RSK) he was elected MP in the Parliament of the Republic of Serbian Krajina, and in 1994 he was elected as its vice-president after the Serbian Radical Party dominated parliamentary majority was constituted. The government fell in late 1994, after which Atlagić resigned from the position of Deputy Speaker. In 1995, Atlagić was Minister without portfolio in the last RSK government, under Milan Babić. After Operation Storm, he had been one of the ministers from 1995 to 2006 by the SRS-promoted Government of the RSK in Exile.

=== 2000s–present ===
In 2006, Atlagić testified at the trial of Slobodan Milošević. He made dubious claims against the Croats which "failed to corroborate", and "insisted that Serbs had committed no bad acts".

In 2007, the SRS had crumbled and Marko Atlagić had supported the Tomislav Nikolić and Aleksandar Vučić faction as opposed to Vojislav Šešelj, becoming a member of the new Serbian Progressive Party's presidency and was assigned to deal with Refugee and IDP problems. As a member of Serbian Progressive Party after the 2012 Serbian parliamentary election he was on the list of members of the National Assembly of Serbia, 2012–2014, which continued to be until the National Assembly of Serbia, 2022–2024. Atlagić "is a member of the Board on the Diaspora and Serbs in the Region, the Board on Education, Science, Technological Development and the Information Society and a deputy member of the Committee on Kosovo and Metohija". In 2022 and 2024, he was elected as the Head of the Board of Education, which some perceived as an insult to the public, academic and political community.

In 2013, he caused controversy in the National Assembly by proclaiming the first Croatian president Franjo Tuđman as an example of a "proper management of the state" and "for a good solution to personnel problems".

Atlagić was one of the ideological creators of the Law on Amendments and Supplements to the Law on Higher Education from September 2018, which "legalized fake doctorates". In 2019, during the Siniša Mali plagiarism scandal and 2018–2020 Serbian protests, he attacked and spread misinformation about professors from the Faculty of Philosophy, University of Belgrade who supported the protests, as well as Serbian-born university professor Raša Karapandža who published a review of Siniša Mali's plagiarized PhD.

In 2020, he was insulting to the political members of the opposition (incl. Vuk Jeremić), and actress Seka Sablić. In 2021, he continued to insult Vuk Jeremić which resulted in a warning by National Assembly President Ivica Dačić. In 2023, PEN International published an article, and Union of Concerned Scientists wrote an open letter to president Vučić because of Atlagić's personal attack which were additionally promoted by the pro-government tabloids which harassed sociology professor Jovo Bakić of the University of Belgrade due to his criticism of the government. In his statements against the opposition, he also made disparaging remarks about the LGBTQ community. His behavior in the National Assembly was described by others, like Zdravko Ponoš in 2024, as a tactic to provoke and insult opposition representatives, in order to "distract us from the essential issues and responsibilities of the current government".

In 2020 and 2021 he co-authored papers which denied that the Srebrenica massacre was a genocide. In 2021 he published a paper in which he claims that the Breakup of Yugoslavia was driven by the US, Western countries, the Vatican, and the secessionist republics of Slovenia and Croatia, who therefore bear responsibility for violating Yugoslavia’s constitution. He also claimed that over 800,000 Serbs were killed in the WWII Jasenovac concentration camp.

In 2024, he became president (chair) of the parliamentary Committee on Education and Science.

== Selected works ==
- Pomoćne istorijske nauke, co-author with Božidar Šekularac, 1997
- Izvori za istoriju Srba do XV veka, co-author with Branislav Milutinović, 2002
- Istorijska geografija, 2005
- Pomoćne istorijske nauke u teoriji i praksi, 2007
