= Sergej Trifunović =

Serbian actor, comedian, singer and politician

- Сергеј Трифуновић
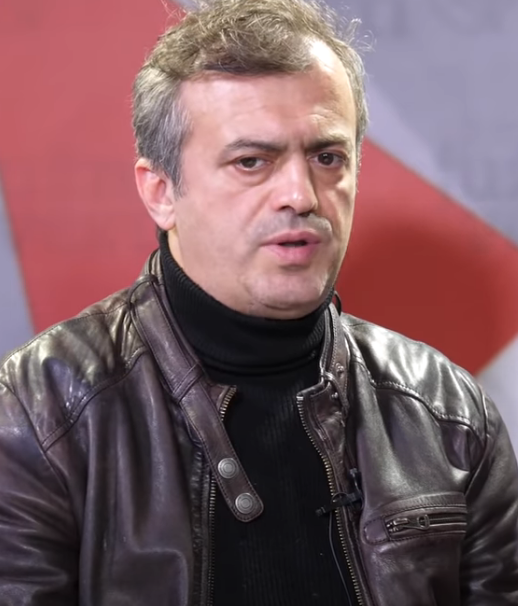
- Trifunović in May 2020

Personal details
- Born: 2 September 1972 (age 54) Mostar, SR Bosnia and Herzegovina, SFR Yugoslavia
- Party: Movement of Free Citizens (2017–present)
- Spouse: Isidora Mijanović (m. 2024)
- Relatives: Branislav Trifunović (brother)
- Education: University of Arts in Belgrade
- Profession: Actor

Sergej Trifunović (Serbian: Сергеј Трифуновић, pronounced [sɛ̌rɡɛːj trifǔːnɔʋitɕ]; born 2 September 1972) is a Serbian actor, comedian, singer, politician and citizen activist.

In 2014, he founded a charity foundation Podrži život (Support Life), that helps underprivileged children with serious medical conditions get adequate treatment. He was the president of the Movement of Free Citizens (PSG) from 2019 to 2020. In September 2024, he was arrested by Croatian police on the border over a social media post deemed insulting to police officers in Split.

== Early life and education ==
Trifunović was born in Mostar, SR Bosnia and Herzegovina, SFR Yugoslavia, to father Tomislav, an actor, and mother Slobodanka, a lawyer. His younger brother, Branislav, is also an actor. His father's career made the family move between cities, so his early years were spent in Mostar, Užice, Kruševac and Belgrade.

His father was born in Mali Popović near Jagodina. In 1990, Trifunović enrolled in the Belgrade Faculty of Drama Arts; fellow students included Nataša Ninković, Vojin Ćetković and Nebojša Glogovac.

== Political career ==
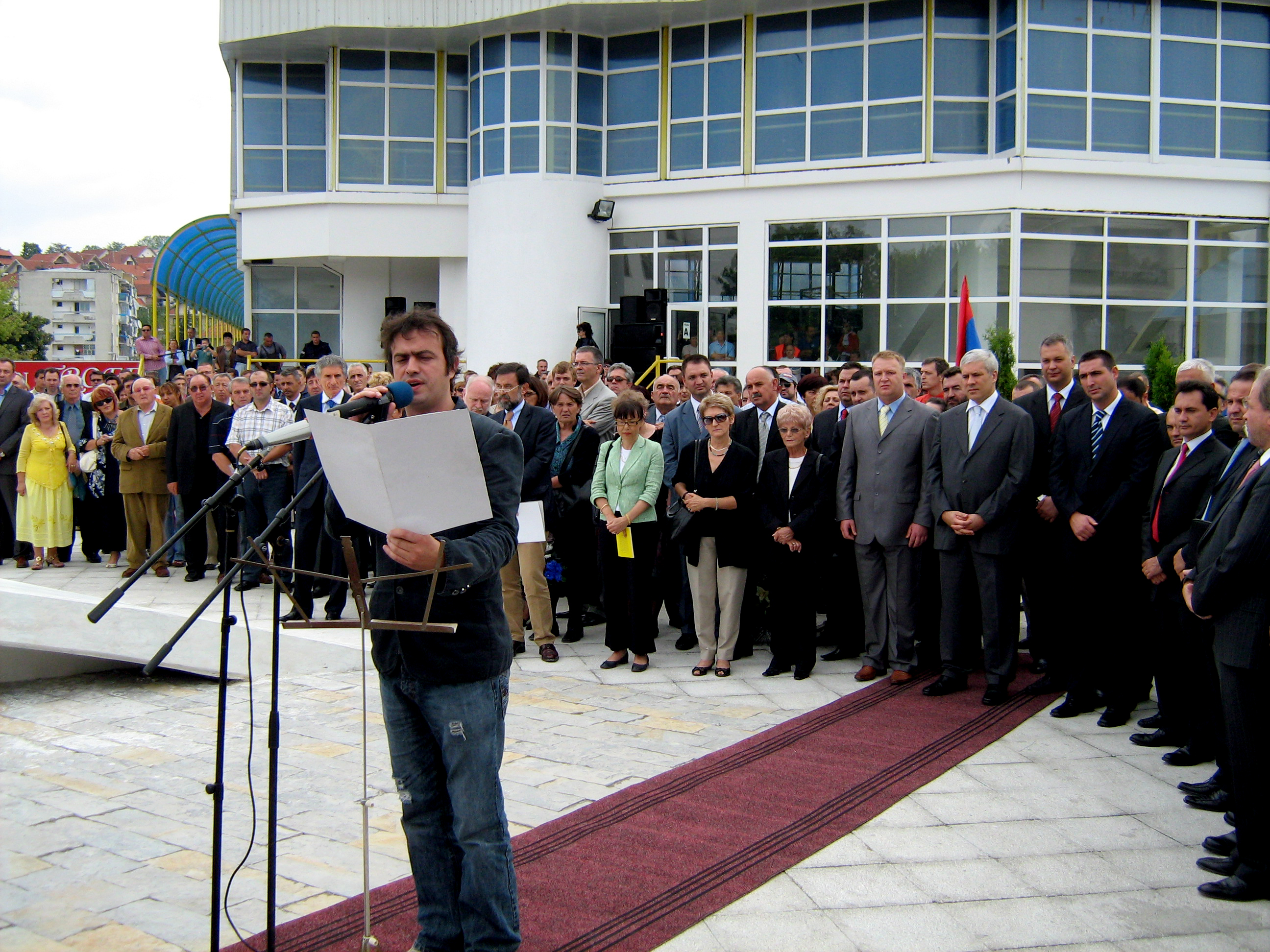
Trifunović at the unveiling ceremony of the first monument to Zoran Đinđić, in Prokuplje, 1 August 2007.

Trifunović took part in protests against the governments of Slobodan Milošević and Aleksandar Vučić. During the 2017 presidential election campaign, he endorsed Saša Janković.

The joint report by European Economic and Social Committee and Civic Initiatives noted that Trifunović and his charity foundation have been targets of a smear campaign and false accusations by pro-government media and members of the then-ruling parties since 2018.

On 26 January 2019, Trifunović was elected the second president of the Movement of Free Citizens (PSG). After nine months of protests over the rise of political violence and after the unsuccessful conclusion of the negotiation mediated by the University of Belgrade Faculty of Political Sciences and NGOs, Trifunović wrote an open letter to David McAllister, the Chairman of the Foreign Affairs Committee of the European Parliament, asking him to consider facilitating a cross-party dialogue on media and election conditions. The first round of inter-party European Parliament-mediated dialogue in Serbia took place two months later. In December 2019, following three rounds of dialogue, the EP delegation members announced that conditions for fair and free elections had not been established. On 20 January 2020, the PSG announced a boycott of the parliamentary election; the decision was later reversed, and the PSG took part in the election, winning 1.58% of the vote and failing to cross the threshold to enter the National Assembly.

On 16 June 2020, Sergej Trifunović published and then deleted the video showing him, along with Srbijanka Turajlić, singing a Chetnik song, which was followed by heavy criticism on social networks from the liberal and leftist public in Serbia.

On 8 July 2020, during a protest in front of the National Assembly, Trifunović was attacked by people in the crowd and suffered a cut above his eye. He said that he had been attacked by undercover members of the Security Intelligence Agency and of the Leviathan Movement, who, according to him, had come to discredit the protest.

On 27 September 2020, Trifunović stepped down as president of the PSG, saying that he had "completed his mission" at its head; Pavle Grbović, the only candidate, was elected to succeed him, while Trifunović was elected to the party's presidency. He remained a member of the party after leaving its leadership.

=== 2024 arrest in Croatia ===
On the night of 16–17 September 2024, Trifunović was arrested by Croatian police at the Bajakovo border crossing and taken to Split for questioning. The police said that he was suspected of a misdemeanour against public order over a social media post that mocked police officers in Split, and asked the misdemeanour court for 30 days in prison and a €1,000 fine; Trifunović told the court that he did not feel guilty. His passport was confiscated, and his wife said that he had been physically attacked by the border police while being detained. President Vučić, describing Trifunović as a political opponent, urged Croatia to release him, saying that "jailing Serbs does not contribute to better relations". Trifunović, who had previously been convicted of insulting police officers in Split and banned from entering Croatia for a year, thanked Vučić for standing by him, but warned that the case "must not become a fight for stirring up nationalists".

== Filmography ==
=== Films ===
Year	Film	Role
1993	Raj	
1995	Someone Else's America	Lukas
1995	Premeditated Murder	Krsman Jakšić
1998	Ljubinko i Desanka	Ljubinko
1998	The Hornet	Miljaim
1998	Savior	Goran
1998	Cabaret Balkan	The hitchhiker of the bus
1999	Ljubavnici	Dragan
2001	Tri posle ponoći	Raša
2001	Munje!	Pop
2001	Treći kanal od sunca	
2002	Ko čeka dočeka	
2003	The Professional	Silent lunatic
2004	When I Grow Up, I'll Be a Kangaroo	Braca
2005	A View from Eiffel Tower	A man with his feet in a laurel
2005	Ljubav	Vanja Novaković
2006	Aporija	Zoran
2006	The Border Post	Ljuba Paunović
2006	Uslovna sloboda	Driver
2006	All For Free	Warehouse worker
2007	Next	Mr. White
2007	U ime sina	Tarik
2007	Maska	Branko Radičević
2008	War, Inc.	Ooq-Mi-Fay Taqnufmini
2008	The Tour	Arkan
2009	Viko	Ivan
2009	Srpski ožiljci	Beni
2009	Wait for Me and I Will Not Come	PE teacher
2010	Montevideo, God Bless You!	Anđelko Komatina
2010	A Serbian Film	Vukmir Vukmir
2010	The Whistleblower	Ivan
2010	Neke druge priče	Đorđe
2011	Turneja	Leader of Panthers
2011	Dodir	Father
2012	Zalet	
2012	Gavran	sailor
2012	Volim i ja tebe	Semir
2012	Odbrana i zaštita	Whiskey Smuggler
2013	Falsifier	Enes
2013	Mamaroš	policeman
2013	Dub Play	Boban Kostić Bili
2014	Little Buddho	Mišo
2014	Jednaki	
2014	Po redu nastajanja	Nebojša Mihajlović
2015	We Will Be the World Champions	Ranko Žeravica
2015	Bourek	
2016	Ime: Dobrica, prezime: nepoznato	Mirko
2016	On the Milky Road	
2016	The Samurai in Autumn	Policeman
2017	Kozje uši	Električar
2017	A Balkan Noir	
2018	Grande Punto	
2018	Apsurdni eksperiment	
2018	Volja sinovljeva	Tuđin
2019	Ajvar	Bane
2024	Cat's Cry (Mačji krik)	
2026	Storm Rider: Legend of Hammerhead	Lazar

=== Television ===
Year	Title	Role	Notes
2003	Lisice	Nebojša Đuričko	One episode
2003	Crni Gruja	Crni Gruja	12 episodes
2006	Sleeper Cell		One episode
2007	Bitange i princeze	Menadžer Kocka	2 episodes
2009	Neki čudni ljudi	Putujući glumac	One episode
2009	Na terapiji	Boris	9 episodes
2009–2010	Ono kao ljubav	Džoni	20 episodes
2012	Montevideo, Bog te video!	Načelnik Komatina	5 episodes
2015	Andrija i Anđelka	Drugar	One episode
2016	Prvaci sveta	Ranko Žeravica	6 episodes
2018–2019	Žigosani u reketu	Petar	11 episodes
2019	Dug moru	Đorđe	10 episodes
2019	Ujka – novi Horizonti	Besic	One episode
2024	Tajne vinove loze	Jagodinac	16 episodes

== Sources ==
- Puls online. "Sergej Trifunović". Lična karta. Puls online.

Party political offices
Preceded by Saša Janković	President of the Movement of Free Citizens; 2019–2020	Succeeded by Pavle Grbović
