= Saša Janković =

Serbian lawyer

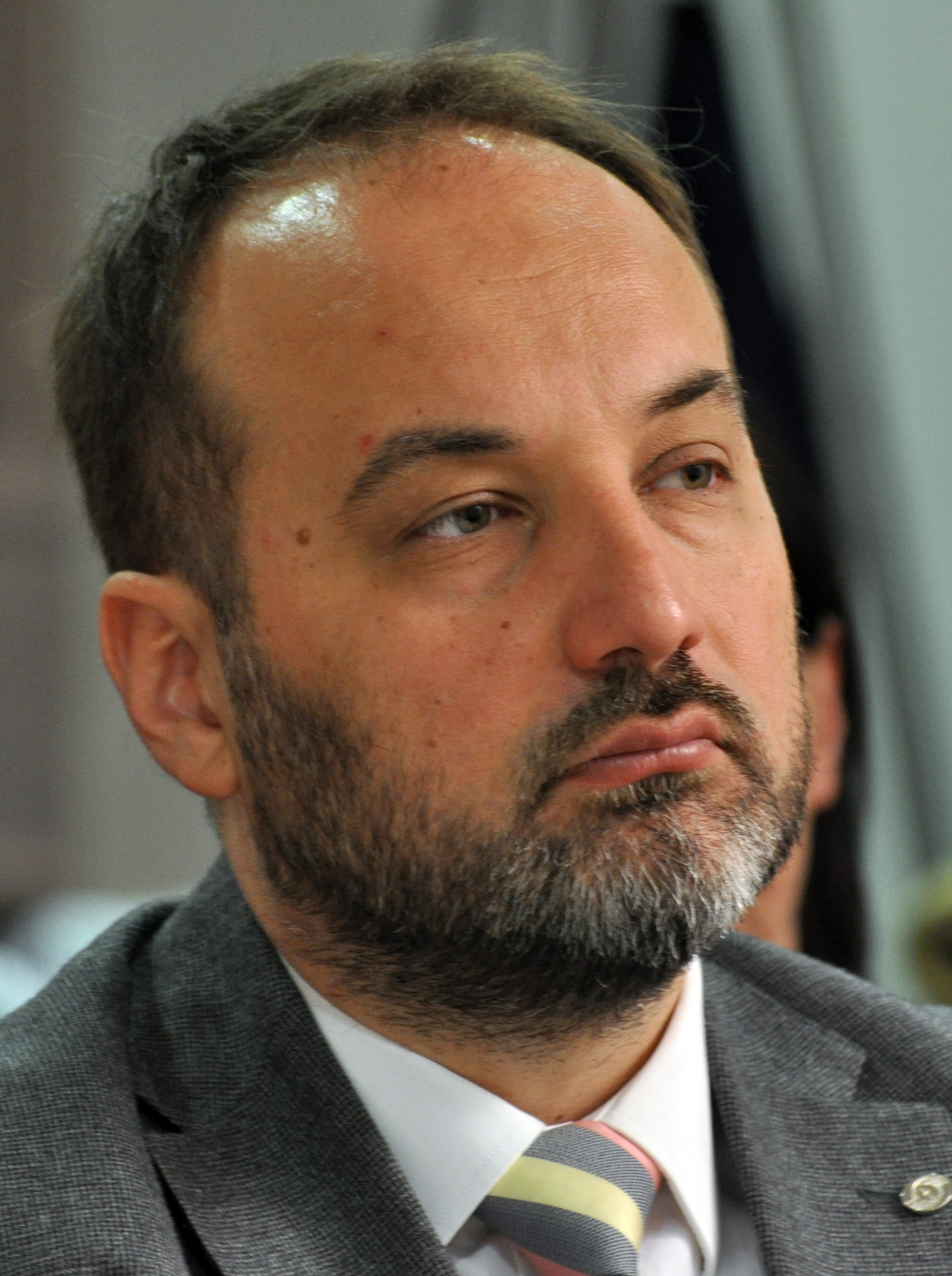

Ombudsman of the Republic of Serbia
- In office 23 July 2007 – 7 February 2017
- Preceded by: Position established
- Succeeded by: Zoran Pašalić

Personal details
- Born: 27 April 1970 (age 56) Loznica, SR Serbia, SFR Yugoslavia
- Party: Movement of Free Citizens (2017–2019)
- Education: University of Belgrade
- Awards: French National Order of Merit

Saša Janković (Serbian Cyrillic: Саша Јанковић, pronounced [sâʃa jǎːŋkoʋit͜ɕ]; born 27 April 1970) is a Serbian lawyer, journalist, human rights activist and politician who served as the National Ombudsman of the Republic of Serbia between 2007 and 2017. He resigned his post in February 2017 in order to run at the 2017 Serbian presidential election, where he came second with 16.36% of the vote. He was one of the founders and leader of Movement of Free Citizens, a centre-left political organization in Serbia before leaving it in January 2019.

== Early life ==
Janković was born in Loznica, Serbia (then part of SFR Yugoslavia) on 27 April 1970. In his school years, he was a talented handball player, but also practiced karate and recreational archery.

In a scenario of extraordinary circumstances, Janković lost citizenship in the newly-formed Federal Republic of Yugoslavia when war broke out in Yugoslav territories due to his father having been born in Bosnia and Herzegovina. The new Yugoslav government listed Janković as a refugee when the Republic of Bosnia and Herzegovina formally declared independence from Yugoslavia. Since Janković was born in Loznica, he tried to file a complaint to the Committee of Petitions and Appeals to correct his "refugee" status, but his complaint was ignored. Due to his refugee status, Janković went into hiding for several months due to the prospect of being deported and sent to war in Bosnia and Herzegovina. Prior to this, Janković was mobilized in Yugoslav Army and spent several months in a war during the war in Croatia.

On April 1, 1993, Janković's school friend Predrag Gojković was found dead with a firearm in Janković's apartment. Janković was not in the apartment at the time of Gojković's death, but a mutual friend was there and called the police. An investigation was carried out by Yugoslavia's Ministry of Internal Affairs. It was determined that Gojković committed suicide. The investigation was re-opened on several occasions, during which Janković was interrogated and tested on a polygraph.

In an interview with Peščanik Janković talked briefly about his life in Yugoslavia in the 1990s. He sold gasoline on the streets (not from a gas station) due to the sanctions against Yugoslavia.

He graduated from the Faculty of Law of the University of Belgrade in 1996. He obtained a specialist degree from the Faculty of Political Sciences of the University of Belgrade in 2006.

Between 1994 and 1997, Janković was a journalist at Beta News Agency. After that, he was employed at the Ministry of Youth and Sports of the Government of Serbia as an associate expert. In 2000, he became a secretary of the Federal Ministry of Sports of the Government of FR Yugoslavia. In 2001, Janković became the Assistant of the Federal Minister of Sports. In 2003, he became a legal adviser at the Mission of OSCE in Serbia and Montenegro.

== Ombudsman ==
On 29 June 2007, the National Assembly of Serbia appointed Janković to the newly established post of the National Ombudsman for a five-year term with 143 votes for. On 4 August 2012, he was re-appointed to the new five-year term with 167 votes for, one abstention, and no votes against. His re-election was supported by all parties in the Assembly.

Janković came into conflict with the Government of Serbia and Prime Minister Aleksandar Vučić in 2014 while investigating an incident in which Vučić's brother Andrej was beaten by gendarmes during a pride parade in central Belgrade. During a hearing in the National Assembly, Janković claimed that Military Security Agency broke the law during the incident. He was then attacked by the MPs of the governing Serbian Progressive Party (SNS) and the Minister of Defence Bratislav Gašić. After that, several MPs of the SNS heavily criticized the Ombudsman and called for Janković to resign claiming his actions were politically motivated. Some MPs and pro-government media outlets even claimed that Janković was responsible for suicide that a friend of Janković committed in 1993 in Janković's apartment using his pistol. OSCE and the European Commission expressed concerns about those attacks against Janković. Journalist Dragan Janjić wrote that Janković is a target of a "smear campaign" orchestrated by Vučić.

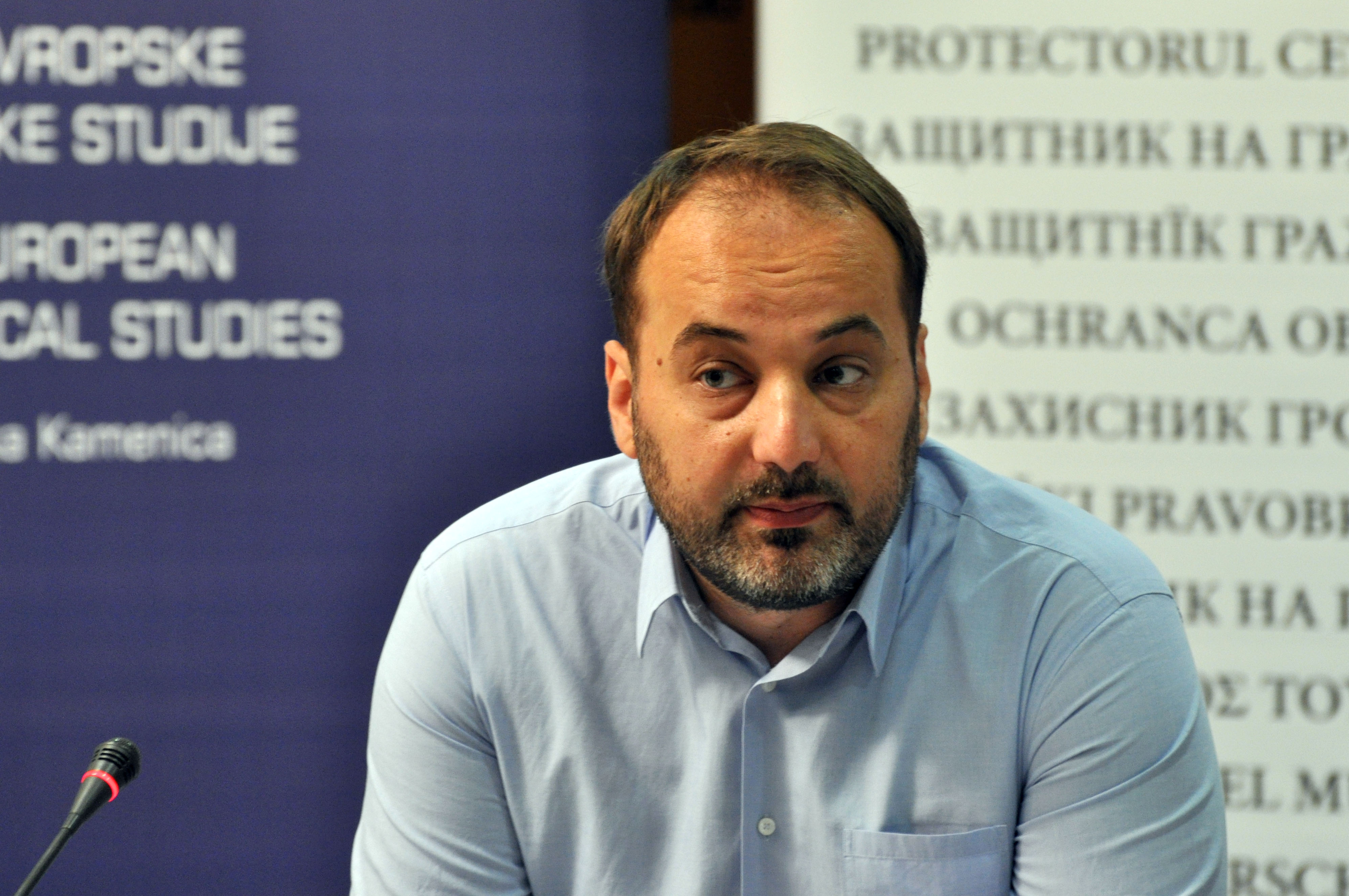
Janković in 2010

Janković clashed with the Government again in April 2015 when he claimed that Bratislav Gašić was responsible for a military helicopter crash in which 7 people have died. Janković criticized Vučić for protecting Gašić, whom Janković blamed for the accident.

Next confrontation between Janković and the Government came in May 2016 when Janković claimed that the Government is responsible for demolishing buildings in Belgrade's Savamala neighborhood under cover of the night by several dozen masked persons. Janković's report claimed that the police was ordered not to intervene during the demolition. After this, Janković was again heavily attacked by the MPs of the Serbian Progressive Party and Serbian Radical Party, who claimed that Janković is not protecting citizens, but is promoting himself instead.

In late 2016, media outlets started speculating that Janković might be a suitable candidate of the opposition at the 2017 Serbian presidential election. In November 2016, one hundred prominent public figures signed a petition to Janković calling him to run for President in 2017. He did not give any definitive answer at the time, saying that the time is not right for such a decision. This was heavily criticized by the leadership of the Serbian Progressive Party and their partners who called Janković a "politician" who only works on his political promotion and called for him to resign. In 2017, Amnesty International reported pro-government media in Serbia continued to smear independent journalists and human rights defenders, as well as the Ombudsperson's Office.

Janković officially resigned his ombudsman post on 7 February 2017 in order to run for President.

== Presidential campaign, 2017 ==
On November 25, 2016, Serbian newspaper Blic published a list of over 100 public figures in Serbia petitioned for Janković to run for president of Serbia in 2017. In December 2016, Janković formally announced that he would run as an independent for president of Serbia in the 2017 presidential election.

This public opinion survey, carried out by CeSID showed that there are more women among the Janković's supporters. The vast majority of supporters (59%) were made by highly educated citizens. In addition, he was supported by the majority of diaspora voters.

At the election, Janković came second, behind Aleksandar Vučić, with 16.36% of the vote.

List of Saša Janković endorsements

Organizations

- Democratic Party
- New Party
- Social Democratic Union
- Vojvodina's Party
- Montenegrin Party
- Roma Party
- It is All the Same
- Ne da(vi)mo Beograd
- Lokalni front
- Građanski stav
- Civic Alliance of Croats
- Podrži RTV
- AlternAktiva
- Udruženi pokret slobodnih stanara (Niš)
- The Hungarian Movement
- Green Network of Vojvodina
- Vojvodina Club
- Antifascist Union of Vojvodina
- Atheists of Serbia
- Civic Platform
- New Movement (Novi Pazar)

Current and former public officeholders

- Vida Petrović-Škero, former President of the Supreme Court of Serbia (2005–2009)
- Zoran Živković, former Prime Minister of Serbia (2003–2004), leader of the New Party
- Dragan Šutanovac, former Minister of Defence (2007–2012), leader of the Democratic Party
- Bojan Pajtić, former President of the Government of Vojvodina (2004–2016), former leader of the Democratic Party
- Branislav Lečić, former Minister of Culture (2001–2004)
- Vojislav Brajović, former Minister of Culture (2007–2008)
- Čedomir Jovanović, former Deputy Prime Minister of Serbia (2003–2004), leader of the Liberal Democratic Party (renounced by Janković)
- Marinika Tepić, member of the National Assembly of Serbia and former Secretary for Sports and Youth in the Government of Vojvodina (2012–2016)
- Jelena Beba Balašević, member of the Assembly of Vojvodina

University and academic figures

- Dušan Teodorović, member of Serbian Academy of Sciences and Arts
- Aleksandar Bošković, professor in the Department of ethnology and anthropology at the University of Belgrade Faculty of Philosophy
- Milan Vukomanović, professor in the Department of ethnology and anthropology at the University of Belgrade Faculty of Philosophy
- Miodrag Zec, professor in the Department of sociology at the University of Belgrade Faculty of Philosophy
- Dragan Popadić, professor in the Department of psychology at the University of Belgrade Faculty of Philosophy
- Dragana Pavlović Breneselović, professor in the Department of Education (Pedagogy and Andragogy) at the University of Belgrade Faculty of Philosophy
- Jelena Mrgić, professor in the Department of History at the University of Belgrade Faculty of Philosophy
- Goran Marković, professor at the Faculty of Dramatic Arts in Belgrade
- Milena Dragićević Šešić, professor at the Faculty of Dramatic Arts in Belgrade
- Aleksandra Jovićević, professor at the Faculty of Dramatic Arts in Belgrade
- Jelisaveta Tatić Čuturilo, professor at the Faculty of Dramatic Arts in Belgrade
- Dejan Sinadinović, professor at the Faculty of Music Arts in Belgrade
- Ljubiša Dokić, professor at the Faculty of Medicine, University of Belgrade
- Dragan Vučović, professor at the Faculty of Medicine, University of Belgrade
- Stojan Živković, professor at the Faculty of Medicine, University of Belgrade
- Srbijanka Turajlić, professor at the Faculty of Electrical Engineering
- Ranko Bugarski, professor at the Faculty of Philology, University of Belgrade
- Ljubomir Madžar, professor at the Faculty of Economics, University of Belgrade
- Stojan Babić, professor at the Faculty of Economics, University of Belgrade
- Fuada Stanković, professor at the University of Novi Sad Faculty of Law and former Rector of the University of Novi Sad
- Ilija Vujačić, professor and Dean of the Faculty of Political Sciences, University of Belgrade
- Rade Veljanovski, professor at the Faculty of Political Sciences, University of Belgrade
- Jelena Đorđević, professor at the Faculty of Political Sciences, University of Belgrade
- Neda Todorović, professor at the Faculty of Political Sciences, University of Belgrade
- Vladimir Pavićević, assistant professor at the Faculty of Political Sciences, University of Belgrade
- Filip Ejdus, assistant professor at the Faculty of Political Sciences, University of Belgrade
- Jasna Veljkovic, assistant professor at the Faculty of Political Sciences, University of Belgrade
- Dragana Dulić, professor at the Faculty of Security Studies, University of Belgrade
- Teodor Ast, professor at the Faculty of Technology and Metallurgy, University of Belgrade
- Biljana Stojković, professor at the Faculty of Biology, University of Belgrade
- Goran Brajušković, professor at the Faculty of Biology, University of Belgrade
- Milorad Vujičić, professor at the Faculty of Biology, University of Belgrade
- Sanja Šovran, professor at the Faculty of Biology, University of Belgrade
- Darko Ivanović, professor at the Faculty of Pharmacy, University of Belgrade
- Mirjana Medenica, professor at the Faculty of Pharmacy, University of Belgrade
- Vladan Bogdanović, professor at the Faculty of Agriculture, University of Belgrade
- Mirjana Drakulić, professor at the Faculty of Agriculture, University of Belgrade
- Milovan Živković, professor at the Faculty of Agriculture, University of Belgrade
- Mirjana Todorović, professor at the Faculty of Economics in Subotica, University of Kragujevac
- Miloš Tešić, professor at the University of Novi Sad Faculty of Technical Sciences
- Danica Drakulić, professor at the Faculty of Economics in Subotica, University of Novi Sad
- Agnes Boljević, professor at the Faculty of Economics in Subotica, University of Novi Sad
- Marijan Jelić, professor at the Faculty of Education in Sombor, University of Novi Sad
- Nataša Polovina, professor at the Faculty of Philosophy in Sombor, University of Novi Sad
- Dima Trajković, professor at the Faculty of Civil Engineering and Architecture, University of Niš
- Biljana Rakić, professor at the Faculty of Economics, University of Niš
- Drago Đurić, philosopher and professor at the University of Priština and the University of Belgrade
- Marija Bogdanović, former Rector of the University of Belgrade
- Nadija Rebronja, professor at the Department of Philology, State University of Novi Pazar
- Dejan Mirčić, professor at the Department of Biomedical sciences, State University of Novi Pazar
- Vesna Rakić Vodinelić, professor and former Dean at the Faculty of Law, Union University
- Dragutin Savić, professor of Genetics, Microbiology, Molecular Biology at the University of Oklahoma
- Aleksandra Jovićević, professor of Art and Entertainment History at the Sapienza University of Rome
- Ivana Senić, research assistant at the University of Michigan Department of Psychiatry

Actors, filmmakers and dramaturges

- Branko Cvejić, former director of Yugoslav Drama Theatre
- Zdravko Šotra
- Želimir Žilnik
- Dušan Makavejev
- Mira Banjac
- Predrag Ejdus
- Vanja Ejdus
- Nebojša Glogovac
- Radoslav Milenković
- Nikola Kojo
- Branka Katić
- Nikola Đuričko
- Dragan Mićanović
- Branislav Trifunović
- Sergej Trifunović
- Ana Sofrenović
- Borka Pavićević
- Jelena Tinska

Other

- Dušan Ivković, basketball coach, Olympic silver medalist, World and three-time European champion
- Duško Vujošević, basketball coach
- Vladimir Arsenijević, novelist, columnist and publisher
- Predrag Koraksić Corax, political caricaturist
- Branka Prpa, former director of Belgrade's Historical Archives
- Bisera Veletanlić, jazz singer
- Nikola Čuturilo, rock musician and songwriter
- Kornelije Kovač, musician and composer
- Kristina Kovač, pop singer and songwriter
- Vlado Georgiev, pop singer and songwriter
- Marčelo, hip-hop artist and writer

== Political positions ==
=== Kosovo ===
In an interview with Novi Magazin, Janković was asked whether Serbia would recognize Kosovo as a state under any conditions. He replied that he "won't put a signature on the independence of Kosovo," adding that "I don't even think anyone would ask that of me." Janković criticized the idea of a partition of Kosovo, calling it dangerous. He also criticized the Kosovska Mitrovica train incident, saying that "I won't allow the military or security services to play with shiny trains to present to the media, while the consequences of that game are suffered by Serbs in Kosovo, especially in the enclaves."

== Awards ==
In March 2015, Janković was awarded French National Order of Merit in the rank of Chevalier (Knight). He was named the “Person of the Year” by Mission of OSCE in Serbia (2011) and by news magazine Vreme (2015).

Political offices
New office	Ombudsman of the Republic of Serbia; 2007–2017	Succeeded by Zoran Pašalić
Party political offices
New office	President of the Movement of Free Citizens; 2017–2018	Succeeded by Sergej Trifunović
