= Mila Turajlić =

Serbian filmmaker (born 1979)

- Born: Belgrade, Serbia
- Occupation: Documentary filmmaker
- Known for: The Other Side of Everything
- Parent: Srbijanka Turajlić
- Website: http://www.dissimila.rs

Mila Turajlić (Serbian Cyrillic: Мила Tураjлић; born 1979) is a Serbian filmmaker. She directed and produced award-winning films The Other Side of Everything and Cinema Komunisto.

== Background ==
Turajlić was born in Belgrade, Serbia. Her mother is Srbijanka Turajlić, a pro-democracy activist. Turajlić studied film production at Belgrade University's Faculty of Dramatic Arts and political science at the London School of Economics. She then specialized in documentary film-making at the La Femis school in Paris and also obtained a PhD from the University of Westminster. She has worked as a researcher and production assistant for the BBC, Discovery Channel and Arte France. Additionally her experience includes working on the features The Brothers Bloom and Fade to Black as an assistant director, as well as on Apocalypto as a coordinator.

Turajlić has shared her experiences in documentary film making by lecturing at schools like Harvard University, Yale, the Sorbonne, and the University of Michigan. Her involvement in pedagogy includes teaching workshops at La Femis's Archidoc and the Balkan Documentary Center. She is also one of the founders of the Association of Documentary Filmmakers of Serbia. Turajlić helps produce Belgrade's "Magnificent 7 Festival", which showcases European documentaries.

== Career ==
=== Cinema Komunisto ===
Produced in 2010, Cinema Komunisto examines how film making was used in Yugoslavia to shape the national identity. For Turajlić, the old communist movie studios symbolize both the beginning and the end of Yugoslavia. According to the director, she was prompted to document what she found at the Avala Film Studios because she "...felt both amazement and anger at how they’ve been forgotten". Built in the 1950s, the studios were one of the largest in the region, welcoming stars like Sophia Loren, Orson Welles, and Kirk Douglas. The president of Yugoslavia Josip Broz Tito was the driving force behind the local film industry. Turajlić gained access to Tito's private archives and interviewed his personal projectionist Leka Konstantinovic.

Cinema Komunisto won for Best Documentary at the Chicago International Film Festival and also received an award at FOCAL International. It was screened at the IDFA and at the Tribeca Film Festival, as well as having theatrical releases in Europe and North America.

=== The Other Side of Everything ===
The 2017 documentary, The Other Side of Everything, is about life in war torn Serbia seen through the eyes of Srbijanka Turajlić, the director's peace activist mother. The subject is depicted as "...a voice from yesterday which inspiringly refuses to be silenced. The country's recent and distant pasts are explored in the film. Permanently locked doors in the family's apartment refer to the absurdities of the old communist regime. Mila's great-grandfather, a wealthy politician, owned the apartment, which was sub-divided into smaller living quarters when the communists took power in the 1940s. Spied on by their new neighbors, the Turajlić family had to watch what they said and did at home. One of the "new" tenants, who lived in the subdivision for seven decades, died during filming, which resulted in the locked doors finally being opened.

Described as "accessible, informative and wryly humorous...", the film won the "Best Feature-Length Documentary Award" at the 2017 International Documentary Film Festival Amsterdam (IDFA). The documentary also received the prize for cultural diversity at the goEast film festival in Germany. Turajlić won for best director at the RiverRun International Film Festival in North Carolina.

The Other Side of Everything made its American premiere at the 2018 San Francisco International Film Festival. Additionally it was presented at the Toronto International Film Festival (TIFF) and had a special screening in Montreal, Canada. The film also represents the first HBO Europe coproduction with Serbia and was broadcast by the network in 2017. It is distributed by Icarus Films.

=== Tito’s Cameraman ===
Turajlić is currently working on her next documentary Tito’s Cameraman, which is composed of archival footage and interviews with Stevan Labudović, whose camera lens "...recorded the birth of friendships that became the cornerstone of the Non-Aligned Movement." Labudović regularly accompanied Yugoslav president Josip Broz Tito during his international travels, documenting his visits with heads of state. To capture intimate moments with these world leaders, Labudović developed a technique using a 50mm lens, so that "... the true nature of their personality could be revealed." He had the opportunity to film Nehru, Queen Elizabeth II, Kim Il Sung, John F. Kennedy, Fidel Castro, among others.

Labudović shot news reels of exotic places that intrigued the Yugoslav public back home. He also recorded historical moments around the world that left an imprint, even years later. He became a national hero in Algeria for filming the country's liberation from France. Born in 1926 in Berane, Stevan Labudović died in 2017 in Belgrade.

== Filmography ==
Year	Film	Director	Writer	Producer	Awards / Notes
2010	Cinema Komunisto	Yes	Yes	Yes	Gold Hugo at Chicago International Film Festival
2017	Druga strana svega	Yes	Yes	Yes	Best Feature-Length Documentary Award at IDFA
2022	Non-Aligned: Scenes from the Labudovic Reels	Yes	Yes	Yes	
2022	Ciné-Guerrillas: Scenes from the Labudovic Reels	Yes	Yes	Yes	
