= Fatherland (movement) =

Political party in Serbia

Fatherland Отаџбина
- President: Slaviša Ristić
- Founded: 19 January 2017
- Split from: Democratic Party of Serbia
- Headquarters: North Mitrovica, Kosovo
- Ideology: Kosovo Serb minority interests
- Colours: Red
- National Assembly: 0 / 250
- Assembly of Kosovo: 0 / 120

The People's Movement of Serbs from Kosovo and Metohija "Fatherland" (Serbian: Народни покрет Срба са Косова и Метохије "Отаџбина", romanised: Narodni pokret Srba sa Kosova i Metohije "Otadžbina"), commonly known as Fatherland, is a political organisation in Serbia and Kosovo that represents the Serbian minority in Kosovo. It is led by the former Mayor of Zubin Potok, and a prominent figure in the Kosovo Serb community, Slaviša Ristić.

The organisation has heavily criticised the Serb List, and it claims that Kosovo is an integral part of Serbia.

== History ==
"Fatherland" was founded on 19 January 2017 in North Mitrovica by the former Autonomous Province of Kosovo and Metohija board members of the Democratic Party, Serbian Progressive Party, and the Socialist Party of Serbia. The first president of the organisation was Aleksandar Vasić. In 2018, Ristić was selected as the president.

The organisation was a member of the Alliance for Serbia, a major opposition alliance in Serbia, during its existence. The organisation has criticised the Serb List for participating in the Kosovan elections, and for joining the Government of Kosovo. The organisation boycotted the 2019 Kosovan parliamentary elections as it claims that participating in the Kosovan elections violates the constitution of Serbia, and it called for the boycott of the 2020 Serbian parliamentary elections.

"Fatherland" endorsed presidential candidate Zdravko Ponoš and the United for the Victory of Serbia (Ujedinjeni za pobedu Srbije, UZPS) coalition in the 2022 Serbian general election.

== Electoral performance ==
=== Parliamentary elections ===
National Assembly of Serbia
Year	Leader	Popular vote	% of popular vote	#	# of seats	Seat change	Coalition	Status
2020	Slaviša Ristić	Election boycott			0 / 250	▼1	SzS	Extra-parliamentary
2022	Slaviša Ristić	520,469	14.09%	▲2nd	1 / 250	▲1	UZPS	Opposition
2023	Slaviša Ristić	902,450	24.32%	2nd	0 / 250	▼1	SPN	Extra-parliamentary
2026	Slaviša Ristić	Did not participate			0 / 250	0	–	Extra-parliamentary

View source data.

=== Assembly of Kosovo ===
Assembly of Kosovo
Year	Popular vote	% of popular vote	Overall seats won	Serb seats	Seat change	Government
2019	Election boycott		0 / 120	0 / 10	0	Extra-parliamentary
2021	Election boycott		0 / 120	0 / 10	0	Extra-parliamentary
