= Srbijanka Turajlić =

Serbian academic (1946–2022)

- Србијанка Турајлић
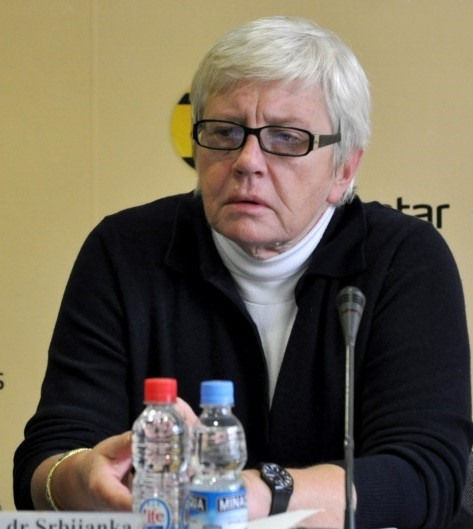
- Turajlić in 2012

Assistant Minister of Higher Education at the Ministry of Education and Sports
- In office 25 January 2001 – 3 March 2004

Personal details
- Born: 25 April 1946 Belgrade, PR Serbia, FPR Yugoslavia
- Died: 25 September 2022 (aged 76) Livorno, Italy
- Resting place: Belgrade New Cemetery
- Party: Movement of Free Citizens (2017–2022)
- Education: University of Belgrade
- Profession: Electrical engineer, professor

Srbijanka Turajlić (Serbian Cyrillic: Србијанка Турајлић; 25 April 1946 – 25 September 2022) was a Serbian academic and political activist. She was a professor at the University of Belgrade Faculty of Electrical Engineering.

Turajlić was Assistant Minister of Higher Education at the Ministry of Education and Sports of Serbia from 2001 to 2004 during the Cabinets of Zoran Đinđić and Zoran Živković.

In 2017, Turajlić was a founding member of the Movement of Free Citizens led by Saša Janković.

== Biography ==
Turajlić finished elementary and high school in Belgrade. As a high school senior, she was a member of the Yugoslav national team at the 6th International Mathematical Olympiad in 1964 in Moscow. She graduated from the Faculty of Electrical Engineering in Belgrade in 1969, received her master's degree in 1973, and received her doctorate in 1979. During her studies, she received student awards several times. She received a scholarship from the French government in Grenoble from 1974 to 1975. In 1982 she was elected assistant professor, as an associate professor in 1989. She served as a lecturer from 1984 to 1986 in Monterey, California. She retired from the University of Belgrade in 2011.

In 2017, Turajlić signed the Declaration on the Common Language of the Croats, Serbs, Bosniaks and Montenegrins.

Turajlić was the subject of an award-winning documentary film directed by her daughter Mila Turajlić called The Other Side Of Everything.

Turajlić died suddenly in Livorno on 25 September 2022, at the age of 76.

== Politics ==
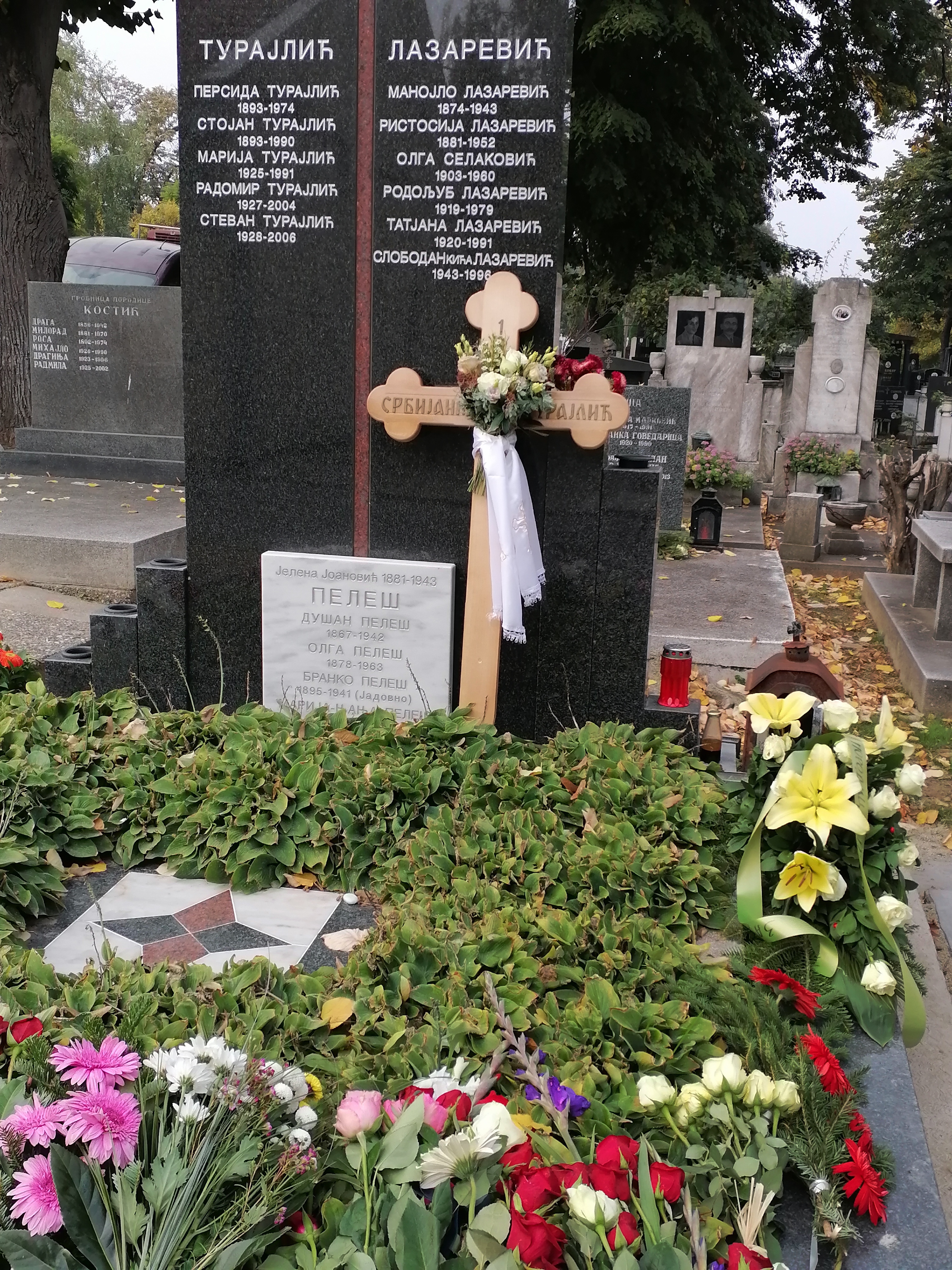
Grave of Srbijanka Turajlić at Belgrade New Cemetery

Turajlić was an active member of the Otpor! Movement in the 1990s. She was the winner of the 2009 Osvajanje slobode Award, which is awarded by Maja Maršićević Tasić Foundation to contribute to the victory of democracy in Serbia. She has been included in the "100 Most Powerful Women in Serbia" list of daily newspaper Blic.

Turajlić was also Assistant Minister of Higher Education at the Ministry of Education and Sports from 2001 to 2004 under Minister Gašo Knežević.

In 2017, Turajlić was one of the founding members of the Movement of Free Citizens led by Saša Janković.
