= Ombudsman (Serbia) =

The Protector of Citizens (Serbian: Заштитник грађана, romanized: Zaštitnik građana), commonly referred to as Ombudsman (Serbian: Омбудсман) is an independent state authority in Serbia, responsible for investigating and addressing complaints made by citizens against other government institutions.

It was established and introduced into the legal system by the 2006 Constitution. Ombudsman is elected by the National Assembly for a five-year-term and is accountable to the National Assembly for his/her work, to which it reports every year or at their request. The Ombudsman enjoys the same immunity as a member of the parliament.

== Missions ==
The Ombudsman has competence to oversee the work of government agencies, the bodies authorized for legal protection of property rights and interests of Serbia and other bodies and organizations, enterprises and institutions which have been delegated public authority. He has no jurisdiction over the National Assembly, the President of the Republic, the Government, the Constitutional Court, courts and Public Prosecutor's Office. The Ombudsman initiates proceedings following the complaint of a citizen or on his own initiative. State administration bodies are legally obliged to cooperate with the Ombudsman and to provide him access to their premises and all data in their possession, regardless of the degree of secrecy, when of interest to the investigation in process or the Ombudsman's preventive actions. As a result of an investigation, the Ombudsman may recommend dismissal of an official considered responsible for violation of the rights of citizens, may initiate disciplinary procedures against public administration employees, and may require initiation of penal, offence or other adequate procedure. The Ombudsman can also act preemptively, by offering advice and opinion on issues within his competence, to enhance the operation of the administration authorities and strengthen the protection of human liberties and rights. The Ombudsman is entitled to propose laws within its scope of competence, give opinions to the Government and the National Assembly on regulations under preparation and address the Constitutional Court to challenge the constitutionality of laws.

== Organization ==
The ombudsman is aided by four deputies (Serbian: Заменик Заштитника грађана, romanized: Zamenik Zaštitnika građana) specialised in legal domains such as Children's Rights and Gender Equality, Rights of Persons with Disabilities, Rights of National Minorities and Rights of Persons Deprived of Liberty.

== List of officeholders ==
Status

Denotes service as acting Ombudsman

No.	Portrait	Name (Birth–Death)	Took office	Left office
1		Saša Janković (born 1970)	14 June 2007	23 July 2012
–		Miloš R. Janković (born 1961)	23 July 2012	4 August 2012
(1)		Saša Janković (born 1970)	4 August 2012	21 April 2017
–		Miloš R. Janković (born 1961)	21 April 2017	20 July 2017
2		Zoran Pašalić (born 1958)	20 July 2017	Incumbent
