= United for the Victory of Serbia =

Electoral alliance in Serbia

United for the Victory of Serbia Уједињени за победу Србије Ujedinjeni za pobedu Srbije
- Abbreviation: UZPS
- Representatives: Marinika Tepić; Zdravko Ponoš; Vladeta Janković
- Founded: 23 November 2021
- Dissolved: April 2022
- Preceded by: United Opposition of Serbia
- Succeeded by: Ujedinjeni (partly); Serbia Against Violence
- Political position: Centre
- Colours: Red; Blue; White
- Slogan: Promena iz korena; ("A change from the root")

Website
- pobeda2022.rs (archived)

United for the Victory of Serbia (Serbian Cyrillic: Уједињени за победу Србије, romanised: Ujedinjeni za pobedu Srbije, abbr. UZPS) was an opposition electoral alliance in Serbia that participated in the 2022 Serbian general election.

The alliance was preceded by the Alliance for Serbia and United Opposition of Serbia (UOPS) coalitions, both of which had existed between 2018 and January 2021. Coalition parties temporarily suspended their cooperation after the dissolution of UOPS, although they resumed cooperation around June 2021. The coalition was officially renewed in November 2021 and formalised in February 2022, under the name United Serbia to prepare for the 2022 general elections. The alliance nominated Zdravko Ponoš as their presidential candidate, Marinika Tepić as the head of their national parliamentary list, and Vladeta Janković as the candidate for mayor of Belgrade.

UZPS was composed of the Party of Freedom and Justice, People's Party, Democratic Party, Movement of Free Citizens, and minor parties and movements. It campaigned under the "United for the Victory of Serbia" (UZPS) banner during the campaign period. Ponoš placed second behind incumbent president Aleksandar Vučić, while the alliance won 38 seats in the National Assembly and 26 seats in the City Assembly of Belgrade. Following the elections, the alliance was faced with a series of conflicts, which ultimately led to its dissolution. SSP, PSG, Movement for Reversal, and USS Sloga continued their cooperation after the election by forming the Ujedinjeni parliamentary group in the National Assembly and City Assembly of Belgrade.

== History ==
=== Background ===
Shortly before the beginning of the protests in 2018, the Alliance for Serbia (SzS) was formed, as an initiative of Dragan Đilas. It was a major opposition coalition, that played a key role in Serbian politics until its dissolution in 2020. The coalition boycotted the 2020 parliamentary election, claiming that "there were no conditions for free and fair elections". Most of the parties decided to continue their cooperation, which led to the formation of the United Opposition of Serbia (UOPS) in August 2020. It remained unstable and was challenged with inter-party problems, which led to its dissolution that took place between December 2020 and January 2021. It then split into two blocs, one that was gathered around the Party of Freedom and Justice (SSP), and the other bloc gathered around the People's Party (Narodna).

=== Formation ===
Representatives of the coalition

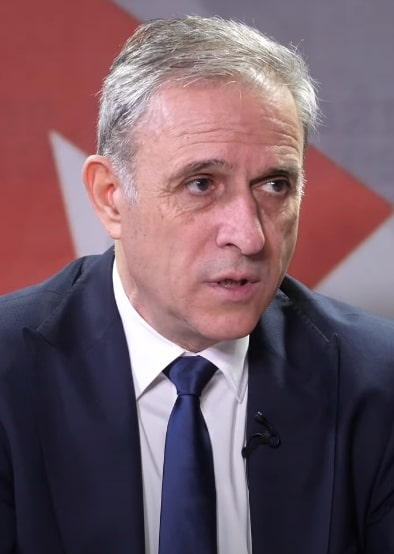
Zdravko Ponoš

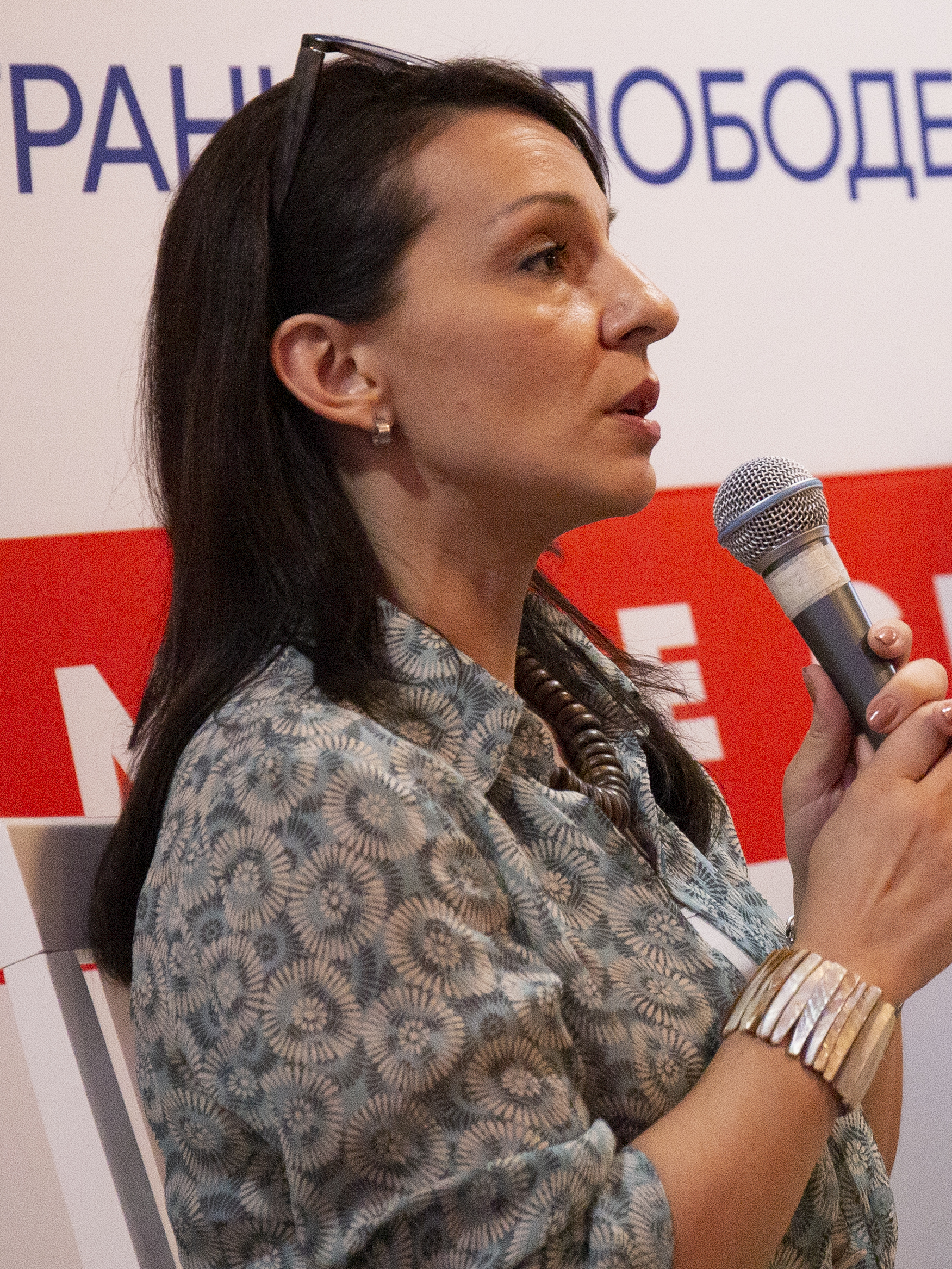
Marinika Tepić

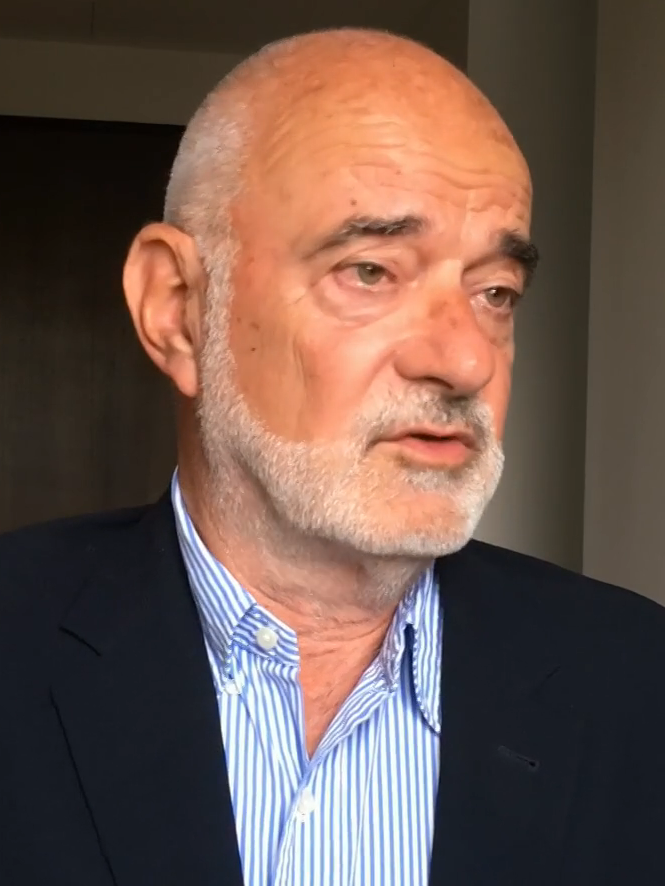
Vladeta Janković

Around June 2021, the parties resumed their cooperation. In October, it was revealed to the public that SSP would begin the formation of another alliance for the 2022 general election. Talks were held in November, after which it was revealed that the parties reached an agreement on 23 November. It was also revealed that Marinika Tepić would head the parliamentary list. During the talks, Zdravko Ponoš stated that he would run for the presidency if "opposition parties unite themselves", and in January 2022, he was proposed by SSP as joint presidential candidate. Other members of the alliance confirmed their support during the following days. Vladeta Janković, an independent nominated by Narodna, was also chosen as their ballot carrier for the Belgrade City Assembly election. The alliance was formalised on 2 February.

=== 2022 election and aftermath ===
Following the dissolution of the National Assembly on 15 February, the United Serbia alliance began collecting signatures to submit their ballot lists. The ballot list for the parliamentary election was submitted on 18 February, named "United for the Victory of Serbia", and it was supported by 13,007 valid signatures. It campaigned also under the "a change from the root" slogan, while its electoral campaign on 22 February, with its first rally being held in Niš. The alliance has held rallies in other cities across Serbia, such as Belgrade, Valjevo, Prokuplje, Aleksinac, Sremska Mitrovica, Kruševac and Novi Pazar during the campaign period. The Republic Electoral Commission confirmed Ponoš as a presidential candidate on 6 March. Its last campaign rally was held on the Nikola Pašić Square, Belgrade on 31 March. UZPS also took part in the local elections, although in Bor and Smederevska Palanka the alliance parties participated on separate lists. The alliance placed second in the general elections, winning 38 seats in total, while in the Belgrade City Assembly election, it won 26 seats. Ponoš placed second in the presidential election behind incumbent president Aleksandar Vučić, winning 18% of the popular vote.

Following the election, the alliance was de facto dissolved, while Ponoš left Narodna. A week later, Đilas met with Aleksandar Vučić to discuss the outcome of the Belgrade City Assembly election. Narodna criticised the move, while Zoran Lutovac, president of the Democratic Party (DS), said that Đilas did not consult with other alliance members before the meeting. Tepić accused Narodna of populism. Lutovac had also stated that UZPS was "just a pre-election alliance", and that he would prefer to create a wide alliance of moderate parties. Regarding the parliamentary groups, Lutovac said that the parties would not form a joint parliamentary group that would be composed of parties inside the alliance. Pavle Grbović, the leader of the Movement of Free Citizens (PSG), stated that his party might leave the alliance to continue alone. He had later stated that the alliance "practically doesn't exist anymore". On 28 May, it was announced that the SSP, PSG, Movement for Reversal (PZP) and Sloga would continue their cooperation. In August they formed the Ujedinjeni parliamentary group, which stayed in opposition to the incumbent government.

== Ideology and platform ==
UZPS was ideologically heterogeneous, although it was also described as centrist. During an interview with Svetislav Basara, journalist Zoran Panović compared the alliance with the defunct Democratic Movement of Serbia. Its representatives had stated their support for the formation of technocratic teams and an anti-corruption body, including lustration, transparency, and social justice. The alliance had also supported the introduction of a law regarding gender equality, and it supported the change of the presidential electoral system to a secret ballot system that would be done in the National Assembly. Ponoš stated that he would sign a law that would return confiscated pensions. The alliance had also stated its support for the formation of the "ministry for the return of the people from abroad".

== Members ==
The alliance was led by SSP, NS, DS, and PSG. Besides them, the alliance also included minor parties and movements.

| Name | Leader | Main ideology | Political position | MPs (2022 election) |
|---|---|---|---|---|
| People's Party (Narodna) | Vuk Jeremić | Liberal conservatism | Centre-right | 12 / 250 |
| Democratic Party (DS) | Zoran Lutovac | Social democracy | Centre-left | 10 / 250 |
| Party of Freedom and Justice (SSP) | Dragan Đilas | Social democracy | Centre-left | 10 / 250 |
| Movement of Free Citizens (PSG) | Pavle Grbović | Liberalism | Centre | 3 / 250 |
| Movement for Reversal (PZP) | Janko Veselinović | Social democracy | Centre-left | 1 / 250 |
| United Trade Unions of Serbia "Sloga" (USS Sloga) | Željko Veselinović | Labourism | Left-wing | 1 / 250 |
| Fatherland | Slaviša Ristić | Kosovo Serb minority politics | | 1 / 250 |
| Movement of Free Serbia (PSS) | Lidija Martinović | Social democracy | Centre-left | 0 / 250 |
| Democratic Fellowship of Vojvodina Hungarians (VMDK) | Áron Csonka | Hungarian minority interests | | 0 / 250 |
| Party of Macedonians of Serbia (SMS) | Goran Ilijevski | Macedonian minority interests | | 0 / 250 |
| Vlach Party (VS) | Janko Nikolić | Vlach minority interests | | 0 / 250 |

== Electoral performance ==
=== Parliamentary elections ===
National Assembly
| Year | Leader | | Popular vote | % of popular vote | # of seats | Seat change | Status | Ref. |
| Year | Name | Party | Popular vote | % of popular vote | # of seats | Seat change | Status | Ref. |
|---|---|---|---|---|---|---|---|---|
| 2022 | Marinika Tepić | SSP | 520,469 | 14.09% | 38 / 250 | New | Opposition | |

=== Presidential elections ===
President of Serbia
| Year | Candidate | | 1st round popular vote | | % of popular vote | 2nd round popular vote | | % of popular vote | Ref. |
| Year | Name | Party | 1st round popular vote | | % of popular vote | 2nd round popular vote | | % of popular vote | Ref. |
|---|---|---|---|---|---|---|---|---|---|
| 2022 | Zdravko Ponoš | Narodna | 2nd | 698,538 | 18.84% | —N/a | — | — | |

=== Belgrade City Assembly elections ===
City Assembly of Belgrade
| Year | Leader | | Popular vote | % of popular vote | # of seats | Seat change | Government | Ref. |
| Year | Name | Party | Popular vote | % of popular vote | # of seats | Seat change | Government | Ref. |
|---|---|---|---|---|---|---|---|---|
| 2022 | Vladeta Janković | Ind. (Note: Nominated by the People's Party.) | 195,335 | 21.78% | 26 / 110 | 0 | Opposition | |

=== Local elections ===
| Municipality | Popular vote | % of popular vote | Seats | Status | Ref. |
|---|---|---|---|---|---|
| Aranđelovac | 2,130 | 9.25% | 4 | Opposition | |
| Bajina Bašta | 2,712 | 19.08% | 9 | Opposition | |
| Bor (Note: The United for the Victory of Serbia coalition appeared on two ballot lists, one which was led by the Party of Freedom and Justice and the other which was led by the People's Party and Democratic Party.) | 6,040 | 25.03% | 9 | Opposition | |
| Knjaževac | 1,383 | 9.72% | 4 | Opposition | |
| Kula | 2,219 | 10.35% | 4 | Opposition | |
| Sevojno | 526 | 13.52% | 2 | Opposition | |
| Smederevska Palanka (Note: The United for the Victory of Serbia coalition appeared on two ballot lists, one which was led by the People's Party and the other which was led by the Party of Freedom and Justice and Democratic Party.) | 3,865 | 17.27% | 8 | Opposition | |
