= Movement for Reversal =

Political party in Serbia

Movement for Reversal Покрет за преокрет
- Abbreviation: PZP
- President: Janko Veselinović
- Founded: 2 June 2015
- Dissolved: 11 November 2025
- Split from: Social Democratic Party
- Merged into: Party of Freedom and Justice
- Headquarters: Nušićeva 6, Belgrade
- Ideology: Social democracy
- Political position: Centre-left
- Colours: Orange

Website
- preokret.org

The Movement for Reversal (Serbian: Покрет за преокрет, romanised: Pokret za preokret, abbr. PZP) was a minor centre-left political organisation in Serbia. Its leader was Janko Veselinović, a professor at the University of Novi Sad. Founded in 2015 as a split from the Social Democratic Party, it merged into the Party of Freedom and Justice in November 2025.

== History ==
Movement for Reversal was founded in 2015, by a Serbian academic Janko Veselinović, who decided to split from the Social Democratic Party, claiming that its leadership does not have a clear vision of how to counter the Serbian Progressive Party and the Socialist Party of Serbia.

The organisation participated in the 2016 Serbian parliamentary elections in a coalition along with the Serbian Left and the Social Democratic Union. However, the coalition finished ninth with 0.94% of the votes and failed to pass the census.

In 2018, the organisation was one of the founding members of the major opposition coalition called the Alliance for Serbia. The coalition boycotted the 2020 Serbian parliamentary elections.

In November 2025, the PZP merged into the Party of Freedom and Justice (SSP); the two parties announced the merger as joining forces "together against an organised criminal group".

== Presidents ==
#	President	Born-Died	Term start	Term end
1	Janko Veselinović	1965–	2 June 2015	11 November 2025

== Electoral performance ==
=== Parliamentary elections ===
National Assembly of Serbia
Year	Leader	Popular vote	% of popular vote	#	# of seats	Seat change	Coalition	Status
2016	Janko Veselinović	35,710	0.97%	▲9th	0 / 250	▼1	PZP–LS–SDU	Extra-parliamentary
2020	Janko Veselinović	Election boycott			0 / 250	0	SzS	Extra-parliamentary
2022	Janko Veselinović	520,469	14.09%	▲2nd	1 / 250	▲1	UZPS	Opposition
2023	Janko Veselinović	902,450	24.32%	2nd	0 / 250	▼1	SPN	Extra-parliamentary

View source data.

=== Presidential elections ===
President of Serbia
Year	Candidate	1st round popular vote		% of popular vote	2nd round popular vote		% of popular vote	Notes
2017	Vuk Jeremić	4th	206,676	5.75%	—N/a	—	—	Supported Jeremić
2022	Zdravko Ponoš	2nd	698,538	18.84%	—N/a	—	—	Supported Ponoš
