= Pavle Grbović =

Serbian politician (born 1993)

- Павле Грбовић
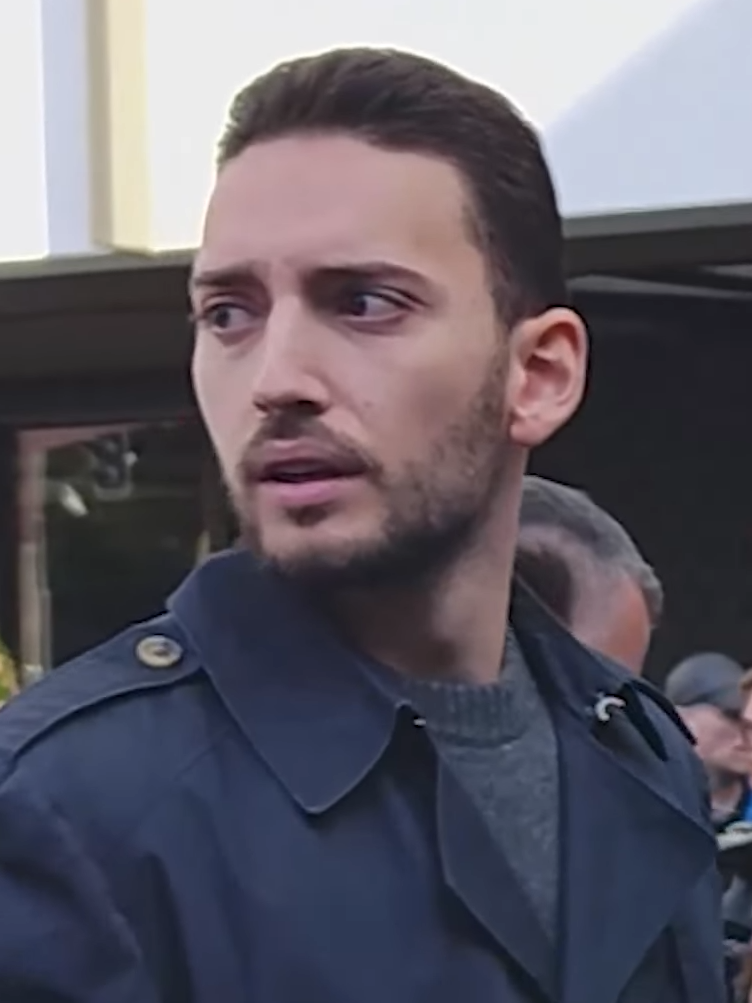
- Grbović in 2023

President of the Movement of Free Citizens
- Incumbent
- Assumed office 27 September 2020
- Preceded by: Sergej Trifunović

Member of the National Assembly
- In office 1 August 2022 – 17 November 2026

Member of the City Assembly of Belgrade
- In office 9 May 2018 – 11 June 2022

Personal details
- Born: 19 November 1993 (age 33) Belgrade, Serbia, FR Yugoslavia
- Party: PSG
- Spouse: Nina Stojaković (m. 2022)
- Education: University of Belgrade

Pavle Grbović (Serbian Cyrillic: Павле Грбовић; born 19 November 1993) is a Serbian lawyer and politician who has served as president of the Movement of Free Citizens (PSG) since 2020 and a member of the National Assembly of Serbia since 2022.

== Early life and education ==
He was born in 1993 in Belgrade which at the time was a part of the Federal Republic of Yugoslavia. He finished middle and high school in Belgrade.

In 2012, he enrolled at the Faculty of Law, University of Belgrade. He graduated in 2016 as one of the best students in the generation. After that, he received a master's degree at the same faculty. He received multiple awards for excellent success in all years of study and awards in several competitions in writing thematic papers in the legal profession.

== Political career ==
He made a decision to join the Movement of Free Citizens (PSG) in August 2017 after the 2017 presidential elections and the forming of the movement. Within the movement, he performed the functions of media team coordinator, secretary and member of the Executive Board and secretary of the Presidency. Currently, he is a member of the presidency of the movement.

He was on the electoral list of the Movement of Free Citizens, People's Party and Dragan Đilas for the 2018 Belgrade City Assembly election. The coalition finished second and Grbović was elected a member of the City Assembly. He said that he does not expect to be privileged because he is young, but that he is also not afraid to oppose opinions and arguments with the elderly because of his age.

He said that the biggest problem of Serbia today is the lack of empathy, solidarity and willingness to face real problems and social decadence and a tendency towards populism, nationalism and chauvinism.

After a bad result at the 2020 Serbian parliamentary elections in which the Movement of Free Citizens only won 1.58% of the popular vote, new presidential elections were announced within the movement, and Grbović was the only candidate for president of the movement and on 27 September 2020, he became the new president.

On 3 April 2022, during the general election, Grbović was attacked by the ruling Serbian Progressive Party (SNS) activists near their local board in Nova Galenika, Belgrade.

=== Member of the National Assembly ===
Grbović appeared on the opposition United for the Victory of Serbia (UZPS) electoral list in the 2022 parliamentary election and was elected to the National Assembly. He was re-elected in 2023 as a candidate of the Serbia Against Violence coalition. In April 2024, PSG left the Party of Freedom of Justice (SSP)-led parliamentary group.

== Political positions ==
=== Foreign policy ===
Grbović is a pro-Western politician and supports the accession of Serbia to the European Union. In December 2020, Grbović stated that he does not think that now is the right moment for Serbia to join NATO, however, adding that the society "must look forward, that is, support cooperation between Serbia and NATO. He called Serbia's foreign policy "schizophrenic".

He is a critic of the Russian influence in Serbia and supports sanctioning Russia due to its invasion of Ukraine.

=== Kosovo question ===
Grbović supported the signing of the Ohrid Agreement between Serbia and Kosovo which aims to normalize diplomatic relations between the two parties.

== Personal life ==
On 10 November 2020, Grbović announced on Facebook that he had been tested positive for COVID-19. He married Nina Stojaković in September 2022.

Party political offices
Preceded by Sergej Trifunović	President of the Movement of Free Citizens; 2020–present	Succeeded by Incumbent
