= Janko Veselinović (lawyer) =

Serbian politician

Janko Veselinović Јанко Веселиновић
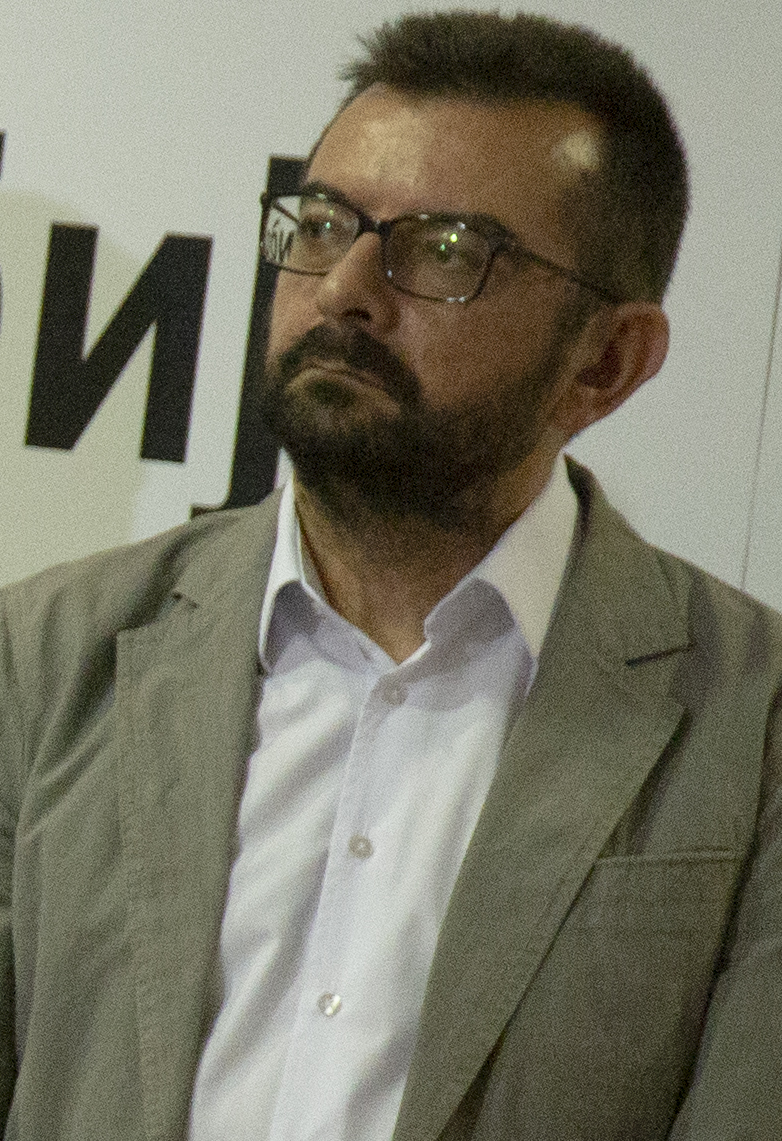
- Veselinović in 2019

Personal details
- Born: November 6, 1965 (age 60) Knin, SR Croatia, SFR Yugoslavia
- Party: SKJ (–1990); DS (1998–2014); SDS (2014–2015); PZP (2015–2025); SSP (since 2025)
- Education: University of Novi Sad
- Occupation: Professor on the University of Novi Sad, MP in the National Assembly of Serbia

Janko Veselinović (Serbian Cyrillic: Јанко Веселиновић; born November 6, 1965) is a Serbian academic and politician. He is a professor at the University of Novi Sad Faculty of Agriculture and a Deputy of the National Assembly of Serbia. He holds a master's degree in contracts on commercial representation and a PhD on legal regulation of governance in domestic and comparative law.

== Professional career ==
From 1991 to 2001 he worked in the YUCO company in Novi Sad, in the area of law degree and later as general manager of YUCO HEMIJE. By decision of the Assembly of Novi Sad in 2002 he was appointed as director of the JKP "Novosadska toplana" (PUC Novi Sad Heating), and from 2004 he was the Assistant Secretary of Science and Technology in the Executive Council of the Autonomous Province of Vojvodina. Since 2008. he is a deputy of the National Assembly of Serbia. On the Faculty of Agriculture on University of Novi Sad he is teaching the Corporate law and Law and contracts in tourism.

== Political career ==
He started his political career with the League of Communists of Yugoslavia and was its member until the dissolution of the party on 22 January 1990. He was a member of the Democratic Party from 1998–2014. From 2004 to 2006 he was vice president of the City Council of Novi Sad. He was a member of the Provincial Board of the Democratic Central Committee and the Democratic Party. Since 2008 he is a member of the Serbian Parliament. He is the President of the Parliamentary Friendship Group with Croatia in the National Assembly of the Republic of Serbia. He is the president of the subcommittee on the status of Serbs in the diaspora issues. He also works with many associations working on minority rights in Serbia.

== Books by Veselinović ==
- Controlling Management (Upravljački menadžment), textbook, Novi Sad, 2003, 327 pages
- Business Law for Managers (Poslovno pravo za menadžere), tutorial book, 2005, 234 pages
- Commercial Law (Privredno pravo), textbook, S. Carić, M. Vitez, J. Veselinović, Novi Sad, 2006–2008, 404 pages
- Contracts and payment in tourism (Ugovori i sredstva plaćanja u turizmu), textbook, J. Veselinović, Novi Sad, 2011, 141 pages
- Commercial Law (Privredno pravo), textbook, J. Veselinović, Novi Sad, 2011, 231 pages

== Scientific works ==
- Economic functions of leasing, Legal Life (Pravni život), 1997., No. 11, the third
- The rights and obligations of the parties in the lease contract, Law - Theory and Practice (Pravo – teorija i praksa), 1997, no. 12.
- Agreement on trade representation in business practice, Legal Life (Pravni život), 1998. No. 11, the third
- The legal nature of agreements on trade representation, Law - Theory and Practice (Pravo – teorija i praksa), 1999, No.1.
- Normative regulation of executive management in Yugoslavia and the countries of the former Yugoslavia (Bosnia and Herzegovina, Croatia, Macedonia, Slovenia), Law - Theory and Practice (Pravo – teorija i praksa), 2001, no. 2.
- Legal frameworks management in Yugoslavia and other countries of the former Yugoslavia, Legal Life (Pravni život), 2001, no. 11, the third
- Control Management, Legal Life (Pravni život), 2003, no. 11, the third
- Control Management - here and in comparative law, The Chance, 2004, no. 14.
- Joint stock company under the new law on companies, Law - Theory and Practice (Pravo – teorija i praksa), 2005., No. 7-8.
- Limited stock company under the new Company Law, 2005, no. 9
- Joint stock company under the new Company Law, Legal Life (Pravni život), 2005. No. 11, the third
- Joint Stock Company in the Republic of Serbia under the new Company Law, Legal Word (Pravna riječ), journal of legal theory and practice, Bosnia and Herzegovina, Serbian Republic, Banja Luka, 2005, no. 5.
- Serbia's treatment of the Serbs in the region - the truth and fallacies, myths and stereotypes of nationalism and communism in the former Yugoslavia / - Salyburg, Center for History, Democracy and Reconciliation - Novi Sad, Graf Marketing - Novi Sad, 9 June 2008.
- Return of refugees and displaced persons and protection of minority rights, as a condition of normalization of relations between Serbs and Croats, editor Darko Gavrilovic, Serbo-Croat Relations in the 20th century - history and perspectives, 2008, 21-36, Salzburg - Novi Sad, Institute for Historical Justice and Reconciliation, Center for History, Democracy and Reconciliation, ISBN 978-86-86601-05-6 COBISS.SR-ID 235 201 287 329 UDC (497.4/.7): 316 344 1994 CIP (497.11:497.5) "19" (082)
- The status, importance and perspectives of the parties of Serbian and Croatian minorities in Croatia and Serbia, Darko Gavrilovic editor, Serbo-Croat Relations: Political Cooperation and National Minorities, 2009, Salzburg - Novi Sad, Institute for Historical Justice and Reconciliation - Center for History, Democracy and Reconciliation, ISBN 978-86-87143-13-5, COBISS.SR-ID 243192327, CIP 94 (497.11:497.5) "19" (082)
- Legal frameworks for rural development in our country and comparative law, Agricultural Economics, 2009, no. 41-42, pp. 53–68. ISSN 0350-5928
- The criminal liability of legal persons in our law, Law - Theory and Practice (Pravo – teorija i praksa), 2009, no. 3-4, pp. 48–58, ISSN 0352-3713, UDC: 347.191:343.222
- Adoption of the Diaspora and Serbs in the region, Nations, States and Diasporas of the former Yugoslavia, 2010, Sremska Kamenica, Institute for Historical Justice and Reconciliation - Center for History, Democracy and Reconciliation, ISBN 978-86-87143-14-2, COBISS.SR-ID 246847239, CIP 94 (497.1) (082)
- Relations between Serbia and Croatia and the European Union, the challenges of European integration, Journal of Law and Economics of European Integration, Official Gazette, 2010, Belgrade, pp. 57–75, ISSN 1820-9459, UDK 327 (497.11:497.5) "19/20", 341 238 (497.11:497.5) "20", 341 217 (4-672EU: 497.5 497.11)
