= Movement of Free Citizens (Serbia) =

Political party in Serbia

Movement of Free Citizens Покрет слободних грађана Pokret slobodnih građana
- Abbreviation: PSG
- President: Pavle Grbović
- Founder: Saša Janković
- Founded: 21 May 2017; 9 years ago
- Headquarters: Kosovska 8, Belgrade
- Youth wing: PSG Youth
- Ideology: Liberalism; Social liberalism; Pro-Europeanism
- Political position: Centre
- Regional affiliation: Liberal South East European Network
- European affiliation: Alliance of Liberals and Democrats for Europe
- International affiliation: Liberal International
- Colours: Cyan
- National Assembly of Serbia: 0 / 250
- Assembly of Vojvodina: 2 / 120
- City Assembly of Belgrade: 1 / 110

Website
- pokretslobodnih.rs

The Movement of Free Citizens (Serbian: Покрет слободних грађана, romanised: Pokret slobodnih građana, abbr. PSG) is a liberal political party in Serbia. It was founded in 2017 by former ombudsman Saša Janković and has been led by Pavle Grbović since 2020. In March 2025, five of its Novi Sad members were arrested and charged with attempting to overthrow the constitutional order, in a case its defenders described as politically motivated; they were granted abolition in September 2026. The party did not contest the 2026 Serbian parliamentary election, instead supporting the Student List, which won a majority.

== History ==
=== Formation and early years ===
Saša Janković was the state ombudsman from 2007 to 2017 and as such often criticised practices of the government, led by the Serbian Progressive Party and Aleksandar Vučić. This positioned him among voters as an opposition spokesperson and gave him relatively high ratings compared with actual opposition leaders and politicians. As his term was about to end, he decided to resign and run in the presidential election scheduled for April 2017. His most notable endorsement came from the Democratic Party, which decided to support Janković rather than field a candidate of its own. This helped him create a relatively united front against Vučić in the election.

In the 2017 presidential election, Janković finished second with 16.3% of the vote and decided to form his own political movement rather than join the Democratic Party. His movement "Apel 100", formed to gather support from intellectuals and other notable citizens for his presidential candidacy, was thus transformed into a political organisation, the Movement of Free Citizens.

Its founders included Goran Marković, Zdravko Šotra, Nikola Đuričko, Sergej Trifunović, Srbijanka Turajlić, Borka Pavićević and Vlado Georgiev. Many of the founding members left the Movement by November 2017, accusing Janković of running it like his own "company" and claiming that Janković's wife exerted enormous influence over how it was run. Following the accusations, Janković offered his resignation at an extraordinary assembly of the Movement, which rejected it. This turmoil led political analysts and other opposition politicians to question the capacity of Janković and the Movement to lead the opposition against Vučić's government.

On 17 December 2018, Janković resigned. The candidates for the new president were actor Sergej Trifunović and lawyer Aleksandar Olenik. The election was held on 26 January 2019, and Trifunović won with 60% of the votes. Olenik and most of the other senior officials then left the Movement and founded a new political organisation, the Civic Democratic Forum.

Trifunović supported the protests against Vučić. On 6 February 2019, the PSG signed the Agreement with the People along with other opposition parties. After nine months of protests and the unsuccessful conclusion of negotiations mediated by the University of Belgrade Faculty of Political Sciences and NGOs, in August 2019 Trifunović wrote an open letter to David McAllister, the Chairman of the Foreign Affairs Committee of the European Parliament, asking him to consider facilitating a cross-party dialogue. The first round of inter-party dialogue mediated by the European Parliament took place two months later.

=== Under Grbović ===
Under Pavle Grbović, who was elected president in September 2020, the PSG joined the United for the Victory of Serbia coalition for the 2022 elections and the Serbia Against Violence coalition for the 2023 elections. The PSG's candidates in the 2023 Serbian parliamentary election carried formal endorsements from the Civic Democratic Party (GDP). In early 2024, the Civic Democratic Party permitted the Movement of Free Citizens to take over its party registration, and the PSG became an officially registered party for the first time. In the 14th convocation of the National Assembly, the PSG's three MPs, Grbović, Anna Oreg and Vladimir Pajić, sat in a parliamentary group led by Grbović together with the two MPs of the Party of Democratic Action of Sandžak (SDA) and Shaip Kamberi of the Party for Democratic Action (PDD), until the Assembly was dissolved on 9 September 2026. In the 2024 Belgrade City Assembly election, the party ran on the We Choose Belgrade list, and its councillors formed a joint group with the Green–Left Front (ZLF) in the City Assembly.

=== Novi Sad case ===
On 13 March 2025, during the anti-corruption protests, a recording of a meeting held the previous day at the PSG's Novi Sad office between members of its local board and of the student group STAV (Students Against Authoritarian Rule), ahead of a large student protest in Belgrade, was broadcast on national television. The PSG said that the views expressed in the conversation did not represent its positions or plans, and its leadership said that the recording was probably authentic. On 14 March, police arrested five PSG members and one STAV activist on suspicion of preparing acts against the constitutional order; six other STAV activists, who had travelled to Croatia the day before, stayed abroad. All twelve were charged with attempting to violently overthrow the constitutional order, the six abroad being tried in absentia. Ana Brnabić, the speaker of the National Assembly, accused the group of planning "terrorist actions" and a civil war, while the defence called the case a political trial and argued that the recording, the only evidence, had been obtained unlawfully through wiretapping by the Security Intelligence Agency (BIA). The six arrested activists spent a total of seven months in detention before being released to defend themselves at liberty. In October 2025, N1 reported that the BIA had monitored the PSG's premises for more than three months and had recorded the conversation by chance, as the surveillance order concerned a person who was not among the accused. The PSG demanded that the proceedings be halted and that the director of the BIA and the president of the Higher Court in Belgrade be held accountable.

On 27 September 2026, shortly before resigning as president, Vučić granted abolition to all twelve defendants. The PSG said that Vučić had "nothing to forgive" the activists, that the abolition prevented the court from ruling that the key evidence had been obtained illegally, and that the decision, made during the election campaign, created a "false symmetry". The STAV activists in exile called the case fabricated; one of them said that she would not return before the election, as she would not feel safe while the SNS-led government was in power.

=== Srebrenica genocide resolution and reactions ===
On 3 July 2025, the PSG, the Party of Democratic Action of Sandžak (SDA) and the Party for Democratic Action (PDD) submitted a draft resolution on the Srebrenica genocide to the National Assembly, proposing that 11 July be declared a day of remembrance, that the state apologise for failing to prevent the genocide and punish its perpetrators, and that denying the genocide and glorifying those convicted of it be made criminal offences. Pro-government media attacked the proposal; Informer called Grbović a "traitor" who "wants to declare Serbs a genocidal people". Critics, including the Movement for the Restoration of the Kingdom of Serbia (POKS) and some supporters of the protests, argued that its timing harmed opposition unity and the protest movement. Grbović replied that the timing had not been chosen but was "historically predetermined" by the 30th anniversary of the genocide, and that "SNS propaganda" would not dictate the party's policy. A PSG delegation led by Grbović attended the commemoration at the Potočari memorial on 10 July 2025. Belgrade city councillor Jelena Banjac received threats and insults after a video message for the anniversary, in which she said that acknowledging the genocide did not make the Serbian people genocidal, as it had been committed by individuals who were convicted for it; the PSG's Women's Forum condemned the threats. When a proposal to place the draft resolution on the agenda was put to a vote in October 2025, Kurir called it "a great disgrace" that Radomir Lazović and Biljana Đorđević of the Green–Left Front were among the six MPs who voted in favour.

On 16 March 2026, the PSG said that the entrance to its headquarters in Belgrade had been covered in graffiti reading "The only genocide in the Balkans was against the Serbs" and that its nameplate had been destroyed. The party called the vandalism an attempt at political intimidation and a dangerous example of historical manipulation, and urged the authorities to find and prosecute those responsible.

=== 2025–2026 ===
In November 2025, the PSG and the Green–Left Front (ZLF) signed a memorandum on strategic cooperation, with the goal of Serbia joining the European Union by 2032. In June 2026, it joined the Platform for a European Serbia, formed under the auspices of the European Movement in Serbia, alongside the Party of Freedom and Justice, Serbia Centre and Goran Ješić's Solidarity movement.

Ahead of the 2026 Serbian parliamentary election, the PSG said that it would take part only if all the parties gathered around the Platform for a European Serbia and the "People's Serbia" coalition ran on a single joint list. On 8 September 2026, it decided not to contest the election and to support the Student List, provided that the list's actions and positions did not contradict the PSG's basic principles. Grbović said that "unconditional support can never be given to anyone", citing differences over European values and the lack of agreement on a joint pro-European list. During the campaign, the PSG accused pro-government tabloids, including Informer, Kurir and Alo, of targeting its members involved in monitoring the election by publishing their photographs and personal data, and asked the authorities to establish whether this was lawful; it said that its cooperation with the PDD, with which it shared a parliamentary group, was no secret. The election, held on 25 October 2026, was won by the Student List with 140 of the 250 seats. The following day, Stefan Simić, the president of the PSG's Belgrade board, congratulated the Student List and, citing its particularly large margin in Belgrade, called on Ana Brnabić to enable early elections for the City Assembly of Belgrade to be held together with the presidential election, which must take place by 27 December 2026.

On 12 November 2026, Jelena Banjac, a member since 2022, left the PSG and with it the joint ZLF–PSG councillor group in the City Assembly of Belgrade. In a statement, she accused the party of downplaying claims of harassment of women and said that those accused had not been held accountable, that women officials had been discredited and targeted until they withdrew, and that the leadership made decisions without transparency and repeatedly violated the party statute. She also said that the party had not protected her after she received threats, including rape threats, over her positions on the wars of the 1990s, NATO membership and minority rights and her description of Ratko Mladić as a war criminal. The PSG had not responded to her claims by the time of publication.

== Ideology ==
It is a liberal and social liberal political party. It supports the accession of Serbia to the European Union. It is a member of the Liberal South East European Network and the Alliance of Liberals and Democrats for Europe.

== Presidents ==
No.	President	Birth–Death	Term start	Term end
1	Saša Janković	1970–	21 May 2017	17 December 2018
–	Rade Veljanovski (acting)	1952–	18 December 2018	26 January 2019
2	Sergej Trifunović	1972–	26 January 2019	27 September 2020
3	Pavle Grbović	1993–	27 September 2020	Incumbent

== Electoral history ==
=== Parliamentary elections ===
National Assembly of Serbia
Year	Leader	Popular vote	% of popular vote	#	# of seats	Seat change	Coalition	Status
2020	Sergej Trifunović	50,765	1.58%	9th	0 / 250	0	–	Extra-parliamentary
2022	Pavle Grbović	520,469	14.09%	▲2nd	3 / 250	▲3	UZPS	Opposition
2023	Pavle Grbović	902,450	24.32%	2nd	3 / 250	0	SPN	Opposition
2026	Pavle Grbović	Did not participate			0 / 250	▼3	Supported SL	Extra-parliamentary

=== Presidential elections ===
President of Serbia
Year	Candidate	1st round popular vote		% of popular vote	2nd round popular vote		% of popular vote	Notes	Ref.
2022	Zdravko Ponoš	2nd	698,538	18.84%	—N/a	—	—	Supported Ponoš	

=== Assembly of Vojvodina elections ===
Assembly of Vojvodina
Year	Leader	Popular vote	% of popular vote	#	# of seats	Seat change	Coalition	Status
2020	Sergej Trifunović	Election boycott			0 / 120	0	–	Extra-parliamentary
2023	Pavle Grbović	215,197	22.55%	2nd	2 / 120	▲2	SPN	Opposition

=== Belgrade City Assembly elections ===
City Assembly of Belgrade
Year	Leader	Popular vote	% of popular vote	#	# of seats	Seat change	Coalition	Status
2018	Saša Janković	157,147	18.93%	2nd	8 / 110	▲8	Dragan Đilas list	Opposition
2022	Pavle Grbović	195,335	21.78%	2nd	3 / 110	▼5	UZPS	Opposition
2023	Pavle Grbović	325,429	35.39%	2nd	3 / 110	0	SPN	Snap election
2024	Pavle Grbović	89,430	12.42%	▼3rd	2 / 110	▼1	BB	Opposition

== See also ==
- List of political parties in Serbia
