= 2024 Serbian local elections =

- June 2, 2024
- Results of 2024 Serbian local elections: Serbia Tomorrow; Alliance of Vojvodina Hungarians; We Choose the Fight; Healthy Serbia; United Peasant Party; JS—SPS; Front for change Party for Democratic Action; Justice and Reconciliation Party; Party of Democratic Action of Sandžak

Serbia held local elections in a majority of its cities and municipalities (excluding the disputed territory of Kosovo) on 2 June 2024.

== Background ==
Initially, the Serbian government planned to hold a local election only for the City Assembly of Belgrade on 2 June, with the other local elections taking place later in the year. The Belgrade vote was required due to the city assembly's failure to constitute itself after the 2023 Belgrade City Assembly election, while the other elections were scheduled to take place in accordance with Serbia's regular local electoral cycle. Ana Brnabić, the president of the national assembly, contended that holding all local elections on 2 June would require a change in Serbia's law on local elections and would unfairly restrict the mandate of those elected in the last regular local election in 2020. Following extended controversy, however, the law was amended on 23 April and local elections were announced for various cities and municipalities on 26 April.

== Electoral process ==
With the exception of Belgrade, the cities and municipalities of Serbia that held off-year local elections in 2021, 2022, and 2023 participated in the 2024 vote. As several municipalities in Central Serbia held off-year elections in 2023, the overall number of jurisdictions holding local elections in 2024 was significantly lower than in the previous election cycle.

All local elections in Serbia are held under proportional representation. Mayors are not directly elected but are instead chosen by elected members of the local assemblies. The electoral threshold for assembly representation is three per cent (of all votes, not only of valid votes), although parties representing national minority communities are exempt from this requirement.

== Parties ==
Serbia's governing Serbian Progressive Party (SNS) and its allies participated fully in the elections. The opposition parties were by contrast divided on their strategy. Among the parties of the Serbia Against Violence (SPN) coalition, the Party of Freedom and Justice (SSP), Serbia Centre (SRCE), and Together (Zajedno) announced a boycott in most jurisdictions, stating that no adequate guarantees were provided that the elections would be free and fair and that there was insufficient time for the situation to change.

As against this, the People's Movement of Serbia (NPS), the Green–Left Front (ZLF), the Movement of Free Citizens (PSG), Ecological Uprising (EU), and the New Face of Serbia (NLS) participated in the vote. Although the Democratic Party (DS) voted in favour of a boycott, it also decided to adopt the position of the majority of the opposition parties, and on that basis it participated in the election as well. Outside the SPN coalition, the parties of the National Democratic Alliance (NADA) alliance chose to boycott the elections in most jurisdictions. Other opposition parties, including Dveri, chose to participate.

On 26 April 2024, SSP leader Dragan Đilas said that although his party would be boycotting the election in most jurisdictions, it would not discourage citizens from voting.

== Incidents ==
Opposition parties accused the SNS of organising polling stations, leading to clashes in Belgrade and Novi Sad as opposition activists tried to enter suspected SNS venues. Ana Brnabić said on X social media platform that the SNS had set up “call centers” to contact supporters and urge them to vote. The Center for Research, Transparency and Accountability, a non-governmental organisation, recorded incidents of organized voting, vote-buying, violations of vote secrecy, and the presence of unauthorized persons at polling stations, which prompted them to file criminal charges.

== Results ==
The Serbian Progressive Party's alliance won the elections in most jurisdictions. In the election for the Belgrade city assembly, the SNS alliance won a majority of seats, followed by the opposition Kreni Promeni (Go-Change).

Opposition parties have charged that the Serbian Progressive Party falsified the results in Niš and New Belgrade in order to claim a narrow majority of seats in both jurisdictions.

=== Belgrade ===
==== Municipalities of Belgrade ====
Local elections were held in all seventeen of Belgrade's municipalities. The Progressive Party and its allies won the elections all municipalities except Stari Grad and Vračar, which were won by the parties of the Serbia Against Violence opposition coalition. Ultimately, the Progressive-led alliance formed government in every municipality.

===== Barajevo =====
Results of the election for the municipal assembly of Barajevo:

Party	Votes	%	Seats
Aleksandar Vučić—Barajevo Tomorrow (Ivica Dačić-Socialist Party of Serbia-SPS; Milan Krkobabić-Party of United Pensioners, Farmers, and Proletarians of Serbia – Solidarity and Justice-PUPS – Solidarity and Justice; Milan Stamatović-Healthy Serbia-ZS; Vojislav Šešelj-Serbian Radical Party-SRS; Aleksandar Vulin-Movement of Socialists-PS; Milica Đurđević Stamenkovski-Serbian Party Oathkeepers-OATHKEEPERS; Miloš Vučević-Serbian Progressive Party-SNS)	7,958	72.38	25
We Choose Barajevo–Bogdan Marinković (Green–Left Front, Do not let Belgrade drown, People's Movement of Serbia, Democratic Party, Ecological Uprising–Ćuta, Movement of Free Citizens, New Face of Serbia)	2,176	19.79	6
Citizens' Group: For a Green Barajevo–When, If Not Now Dr. Dejan Žujović	860	7.82	2
Total	10,994	100.00	33
Valid votes	10,994	96.29	
Invalid/blank votes	423	3.71	
Total votes	11,417	100.00	
Registered voters/turnout	23,565	48.45	

Twenty of the twenty-five candidates elected on the Barajevo Tomorrow were endorsed by Serbian Progressive Party, two by the Socialist Party of Serbia, and one each by the Movement of Socialists, the Serbian Party Oathkeepers, and the Serbian Radical Party.

Of the six candidates elected on the We Choose Barajevo list, two each were endorsed by the Green–Left Front and the New Face of Serbia, and one each by the Democratic Party and the People's Movement of Serbia.

Bratoljub Stanisavljević, who was elected with an endorsement from the Progressives, was chosen as the municipality's mayor on 10 July 2024.

===== Čukarica =====
Results of the election for the municipal assembly of Čukarica:

Party	Votes	%	Seats
Aleksandar Vučić—Čukarica Tomorrow (Ivica Dačić-Socialist Party of Serbia-SPS; Milan Krkobabić-Party of United Pensioners, Farmers, and Proletarians of Serbia – Solidarity and Justice-PUPS – Solidarity and Justice; Dragan Marković Palma-United Serbia-JS; Dr. Vojislav Šešelj-Serbian Radical Party-SRS; Aleksandar Vulin-Movement of Socialists-PS; Milica Đurđević Stamenkovski-Serbian Party Oathkeepers-OATHKEEPERS; Andreja Mladenović-Independent Serbian Party-SAMOSTALNA; Miloš Vučević-Serbian Progressive Party-SNS)	40,433	56.26	26
We Choose Čukarica–Stevan Banjac (Green–Left Front, Do not let Belgrade drown, People's Movement of Serbia, Democratic Party, Ecological Uprising–Ćuta, Movement of Free Citizens, New Face of Serbia)	23,690	32.96	15
Citizens' Group: For a Green Čukarica–When, If Not Now Dr. Dejan Žujović	7,744	10.78	4
Total	71,867	100.00	45
Valid votes	71,867	96.74	
Invalid/blank votes	2,422	3.26	
Total votes	74,289	100.00	
Registered voters/turnout	163,989	45.30	

Twenty-two of the twenty-six candidates elected on the Čukarica Tomorrow list were endorsed by Serbian Progressive Party, two by the Socialist Party of Serbia, and one each by the Serbian Party Oathkeepers and the Serbian Radical Party. Parliamentarian Vladimir Orlić, a vice-president of the Progressive Party, was elected from the lead position on the list, and former parliamentarian Nikola Dragićević of the Oathkeepers appeared in the forty-fifth and final position. Orlić resigned his seat on 10 July 2024, the day the new assembly was established. Dragićević will have the right to enter the assembly if the elected member of the Oathkeepers leaves for any reason.

Six of the fifteen candidates elected on the We Choose Čukarica list were endorsed by the Green–Left Front, four by the People's Movement of Serbia, three by the Democratic Party, and one each by the Movement of Free Citizens and the New Face of Serbia.

Nikola Aritonović of the Serbian Progressive Party was chosen as mayor of the municipality on 10 July 2024.

===== Grocka =====
Results of the election for the municipal assembly of Grocka:

Party	Votes	%	Seats
Aleksandar Vučić—Grocka Tomorrow (Ivica Dačić-Socialist Party of Serbia-SPS; Dr. Vojislav Šešelj-Serbian Radical Party-SRS; Milica Đurđević Stamenkovski-Serbian Party Oathkeepers-OATHKEEPERS; Andreja Mladenović-Independent Serbian Party-SAMOSTALNA; Miloš Vučević-Serbian Progressive Party-SNS)	21,571	71.67	27
We Choose Grocka–Nemanja Todorović (Green–Left Front, Do not let Belgrade drown, People's Movement of Serbia, Democratic Party, Ecological Uprising–Ćuta, Movement of Free Citizens, New Face of Serbia)	4,238	14.08	5
We – Voice from the People	2,184	7.26	2
I Am Grocka, You Are Grocka–Start the Changes! (European Green Party)	1,180	3.92	1
Citizens' Group: We – For Grocka	924	3.07	–
Total	30,097	100.00	35
Valid votes	30,097	96.93	
Invalid/blank votes	952	3.07	
Total votes	31,049	100.00	
Registered voters/turnout	72,914	42.58	

Twenty-one of the twenty-seven candidates elected on the Grocka Tomorrow list were endorsed by Serbian Progressive Party, three by the Socialist Party of Serbia, two by the Serbian Party Oathkeepers, and one by the Independent Serbian Party.

Of the five candidates elected on the We Choose Grocka list, two each were endorsed by the Democratic Party and the People's Movement of Serbia and one by the Movement of Free Citizens.

Saša Čaprić of the Serbian Progressive Party was chosen as mayor of the municipality on 9 July 2024.

===== Lazarevac =====
Results of the election for the municipal assembly of Lazarevac:

Party	Votes	%	Seats
Aleksandar Vučić—Lazarevac Tomorrow (Ivica Dačić-Socialist Party of Serbia-SPS; Milan Stamatović-Healthy Serbia-ZS; Dr. Vojislav Šešelj-Serbian Radical Party-SRS; Aleksandar Vulin-Movement of Socialists-PS; Milica Đurđević Stamenkovski-Serbian Party Oathkeepers-OATHKEEPERS; Miodrag Milićević–United for Lazarevac; Miloš Vučević-Serbian Progressive Party-SNS)	16,583	57.51	37
Citizens' Group: Dr. Savo Manojlović–I'm Lazarevac Too–Go-Change	4,306	14.93	9
We Choose Lazarevac–Ivan Todorović (Green–Left Front, Do not let Belgrade drown, People's Movement of Serbia, Democratic Party, Ecological Uprising–Ćuta, Movement of Free Citizens, New Face of Serbia)	3,482	12.08	7
Citizens' Group: We – Power of the People, Prof. Dr. Branimir Nestorović–Lazarevac	2,539	8.81	5
We Are Lazarevac–United for Lazarevac–Serbian Movement Dveri, People's Party	729	2.53	–
I Am Lazarevac, You Are Lazarevac–Start the Changes! (European Green Party)	694	2.41	2
Russian Party–Serbs and Russians Are Brothers Forever!	501	1.74	1
Total	28,834	100.00	61
Valid votes	28,834	97.85	
Invalid/blank votes	633	2.15	
Total votes	29,467	100.00	
Registered voters/turnout	49,790	59.18	

Twenty-seven of the thirty-seven candidates elected on the Lazarevac Tomorrow list were endorsed by Serbian Progressive Party, four by the Socialist Party of Serbia, three by the Serbian Party Oathkeepers, and one each by Healthy Serbia, the Movement of Socialists, and the Serbian Radical Party.

Three of the seven candidates elected on the We Choose Lazarevac list were endorsed by the Democratic Party, two by the People's Movement of Serbia, and one each by the Movement of Free Citizens and the New Face of Serbia.

Tomislav Rikanović of the Progressive Party was chosen as mayor on 10 July 2024.

===== Mladenovac =====
Results of the election for the municipal assembly of Mladenovac:

Party	Votes	%	Seats
Aleksandar Vučić—Mladenovac Tomorrow (Ivica Dačić-Socialist Party of Serbia-SPS; Rasim Ljajić-Social Democratic Party of Serbia-SDP Serbia; Dragan Marković Palma-United Serbia-JS; Dr. Vojislav Šešelj-Serbian Radical Party-SRS; Milica Đurđević Stamenkovski-Serbian Party Oathkeepers-OATHKEEPERS; Miloš Vučević-Serbian Progressive Party-SNS)	14,814	64.76	38
Agreement for Mladenovac (Green Section Initiative, Eko Team Mladenovac, Alliance for the Revival of Mladenovac, Citizens' Association With Dignity, Initiative Mladenovac With Dignity, Association of Citizens Romano Glaso)	3,072	13.43	7
We Choose Mladenovac–Danijel Pantić (Green–Left Front, Do not let Belgrade drown, People's Movement of Serbia, Democratic Party, Ecological Uprising–Ćuta, Movement of Free Citizens, New Face of Serbia)	2,412	10.54	6
Citizens' Group: We – Power of the People, Prof. Dr. Branimir Nestorović–Mladenovac	1,875	8.20	4
Citizens' Group: We – Voice from the People	703	3.07	–
Total	22,876	100.00	55
Valid votes	22,876	96.95	
Invalid/blank votes	719	3.05	
Total votes	23,595	100.00	
Registered voters/turnout	44,915	52.53	

Thirty-two of the thirty-eight candidates elected on the Mladenovac Tomorrow list were endorsed by Serbian Progressive Party, three by the Socialist Party of Serbia, and one each by the Serbian Party Oathkeepers, the Serbian Radical Party, and United Serbia.

The candidates elected on the Agreement for Mladenovac list did not have specific party endorsements.

Of the six candidates elected on the We Choose Mladenovac list, two each were endorsed by the Green–Left Front and the People's Movement of Serbia, and one each by the Democratic Party and the New Face of Serbia.

Bogdan Vuksanović of the Progressive Party was chosen as mayor for a term beginning on 9 July 2024.

===== New Belgrade =====
The results of the election for the municipal assembly of New Belgrade (as posted by the municipal election commission) are as follows. Opposition parties charged electoral fraud once the preliminary results were made public, with Jelena Jerinić saying that their data showed the combined opposition winning a majority of seats.

Party	Votes	%	Seats
Aleksandar Vučić—New Belgrade Tomorrow (Ivica Dačić-Socialist Party of Serbia-SPS; Rasim Ljajić-Social Democratic Party of Serbia-SDP Serbia; Milan Krkobabić-Party of United Pensioners, Farmers, and Proletarians of Serbia – Solidarity and Justice-PUPS – Solidarity and Justice; Dr. Vojislav Šešelj-Serbian Radical Party-SRS; Milan Stamatović-Healthy Serbia-ZS; Milica Đurđević Stamenkovski-Serbian Party Oathkeepers-OATHKEEPERS; Siniša Bukomir-Society for Cerebral and Infantile Paralysis New Belgrade; Aleksandar Vulin-Movement of Socialists-PS; Ivan Karić-Greens of Serbia-ZS; Miloš Vučević-Serbian Progressive Party-SNS)	44,971	47.52	25
Citizens' Group: Dr. Savo Manojlović–I'm New Belgrade Too–Go-Change	25,512	26.96	14
We Choose New Belgrade–Jelena Jerinić–Ivana Rokvić (Green–Left Front, Do not let Belgrade drown, People's Movement of Serbia, Democratic Party, Ecological Uprising–Ćuta, Movement of Free Citizens, New Face of Serbia)	16,901	17.86	9
Saša Radulović–Enough Is Enough (DJB)–A Solution for Change	2,780	2.94	–
Citizens' Group: For a Green New Belgrade–When, If Not Now Dr. Dejan Žujović	2,562	2.71	–
Russian Party–Serbs and Russians Are Brothers Forever!	1,902	2.01	1
Total	94,628	100.00	49
Valid votes	94,628	97.77	
Invalid/blank votes	2,162	2.23	
Total votes	96,790	100.00	
Registered voters/turnout	203,674	47.52	

Seventeen of the twenty-five candidates elected on the New Belgrade Tomorrow list were endorsed by the Serbian Progressive Party, three by the Socialist Party of Serbia, and one each by the Movement of Socialists, the PUPS, the Serbian Radical Party, the Social Democratic Party of Serbia, and the Society for Cerebral and Infantile Paralysis New Belgrade. Incumbent delegate Marija Zdravković of the Progressives was re-elected from the lead position on the list.

Four of the nine candidates elected on the We Choose New Belgrade list were endorsed by the Green–Left Front, two each by the Democratic Party and the People's Movement of Serbia, and one by the Movement of Free Citizens.

Former parliamentarian and presidential candidate Branka Stamenković was the lead candidate on the Enough Is Enough list.

Ivana Nikolić of the Serbian Progressive Party (not to be confused with the former Serbian Progressive Party parliamentarian of the same name) was chosen as mayor on 16 July 2024.

===== Obrenovac =====
Results of the election for the municipal assembly of Obrenovac:

Party	Votes	%	Seats
Aleksandar Vučić—Obrenovac Tomorrow (Ivica Dačić-Socialist Party of Serbia-SPS; Milan Krkobabić-Party of United Pensioners, Farmers, and Proletarians of Serbia – Solidarity and Justice-PUPS – Solidarity and Justice; Milan Stamatović-Healthy Serbia-ZS; Dr. Vojislav Šešelj-Serbian Radical Party-SRS; Aleksandar Vulin-Movement of Socialists-PS; Nenad Popović-Serbian People's Party-SNP; Milica Đurđević Stamenkovski-Serbian Party Oathkeepers-OATHKEEPERS; Miloš Vučević-Serbian Progressive Party-SNS)	21,213	68.37	38
Citizens' Group: For Our Obrenovac–Heart of Resistance, Voice of Change–Đorđe Janjić	5,170	16.66	9
We Choose Obrenovac–Goran Bojić (Green–Left Front, Do not let Belgrade drown, People's Movement of Serbia, Democratic Party, Ecological Uprising–Ćuta, Movement of Free Citizens, New Face of Serbia)	4,644	14.97	8
Total	31,027	100.00	55
Valid votes	31,027	97.09	
Invalid/blank votes	930	2.91	
Total votes	31,957	100.00	
Registered voters/turnout	64,020	49.92	

Thirty of the thirty-eight candidates elected on the Obrenovac Tomorrow list were endorsed by the Serbian Progressive Party, four by the Socialist Party of Serbia, and one each by Healthy Serbia, the Movement of Socialists, the Serbian Party Oathkeepers, and the Serbian Radical Party.

Three of the eight candidates elected on the We Choose Obrenovac list were endorsed by the Democratic Party, two each by the New Face of Serbia and the People's Movement of Serbia, and one by the Green–Left Front.

Milorad Grčić of the Progressive Party was chosen as mayor on 10 July 2024.

===== Palilula =====
Results of the election for the municipal assembly of Palilula:

Party	Votes	%	Seats
Aleksandar Vučić—Palilula Tomorrow (Ivica Dačić-Socialist Party of Serbia-SPS; Rasim Ljajić-Social Democratic Party of Serbia-SDP Serbia; Dragan Marković Palma-United Serbia; Dr. Vojislav Šešelj-Serbian Radical Party-SRS; Milica Đurđević Stamenkovski-Serbian Party Oathkeepers-OATHKEEPERS; Miloš Vučević-Serbian Progressive Party-SNS)	40,194	59.90	33
We Choose Palilula (Green–Left Front, Do not let Belgrade drown, People's Movement of Serbia, Democratic Party, Ecological Uprising–Ćuta, Movement of Free Citizens, New Face of Serbia)	16,669	24.84	14
Citizens' Group: Green for Palilula	10,240	15.26	8
Total	67,103	100.00	55
Valid votes	67,103	94.85	
Invalid/blank votes	3,642	5.15	
Total votes	70,745	100.00	
Registered voters/turnout	173,272	40.83	

Twenty-eight of the thirty-three candidates elected on the Palilula Tomorrow list were endorsed by the Serbian Progressive Party, three by the Socialist Party of Serbia, and one each by the Serbian Party Oathkeepers and the Serbian Radical Party.

Six of the fourteen candidates elected on the We Choose Palilula list were endorsed by the Green–Left Front, five by the People's Movement of Serbia, two by the Democratic Party, and one by the Movement of Free Citizens.

Ivana Medić of the Progressive Party was chosen as mayor on 12 July 2024.

===== Rakovica =====
Results of the election for the municipal assembly of Rakovica:

Party	Votes	%	Seats
Aleksandar Vučić—Rakovica Tomorrow (Ivica Dačić-Socialist Party of Serbia-SPS; Rasim Ljajić-Social Democratic Party of Serbia-SDP Serbia; Milan Krkobabić-Party of United Pensioners, Farmers, and Proletarians of Serbia – Solidarity and Justice-PUPS – Solidarity and Justice; Dr. Vojislav Šešelj-Serbian Radical Party-SRS; Aleksandar Vulin-Movement of Socialists-PS; Milica Đurđević Stamenkovski-Serbian Party Oathkeepers-OATHKEEPERS; Andreja Mladenović-Independent Serbian Party-SAMOSTALNA; Miloš Vučević-Serbian Progressive Party-SNS)	25,017	56.96	30
We Choose Rakovica–Dušan Pavlović (Green–Left Front, Do not let Belgrade drown, People's Movement of Serbia, Democratic Party, Ecological Uprising–Ćuta, Movement of Free Citizens, New Face of Serbia)	12,490	28.44	14
Saša Radulović–Enough Is Enough (DJB)–A Solution for Change	2,247	5.12	2
Rakovica Is Our Home–Bojan Lazić (People's Party–Vladimir Gajić, Serbian Movement Dveri–Boško Obradović, I Live For Serbia Movement–Dr. Jovana Stojković)	2,129	4.85	2
Citizens' Group: United Opposition of Rakovica–Slobodan Đukić	2,037	4.64	2
Total	43,920	100.00	50
Valid votes	43,920	97.14	
Invalid/blank votes	1,292	2.86	
Total votes	45,212	100.00	
Registered voters/turnout	99,344	45.51	

Twenty-three of the thirty candidates elected on the Rakovica Tomorrow list were endorsed by the Serbian Progressive Party, four by the Socialist Party of Serbia, and one each by the PUPS, the Serbian Party Oathkeepers, and the Serbian Radical Party. Progressive Party parliamentarian Dušan Stojiljković appeared in the thirty-fourth position on the list and, while not initially elected, received a replacement mandate on 14 August 2024.

Five of the fourteen candidates elected on the We Choose Rakovica list were endorsed by the Green–Left Front, four by the Democratic Party, three by the People's Movement of Serbia, and one each by the Movement of Free Citizens and the New Face of Serbia.

Both of the candidates elected on the Rakovica Is Our Home list were endorsed by the People's Party.

Incumbent mayor Miloš Simić of the Progressive Party was confirmed for another term in office after the election.

===== Savski Venac =====
Results of the election for the municipal assembly of Savski Venac:

Party	Votes	%	Seats
Aleksandar Vučić—Savski Venac Tomorrow (Ivica Dačić-Socialist Party of Serbia-SPS; Milan Krkobabić-Party of United Pensioners, Farmers, and Proletarians of Serbia – Solidarity and Justice-PUPS – Solidarity and Justice; Dr. Vojislav Šešelj-Serbian Radical Party-SRS; Milica Đurđević Stamenkovski-Serbian Party Oathkeepers-OATHKEEPERS; Miloš Vučević-Serbian Progressive Party-SNS)	7,851	45.62	18
We Choose Savski Venac–Prof. Dr. Snežana Rakić (Green–Left Front, Do not let Belgrade drown, People's Movement of Serbia, Democratic Party, Ecological Uprising–Ćuta, Movement of Free Citizens, New Face of Serbia)	7,308	42.47	16
Citizens' Group: "For a Green Savski Venac–When, If Not Now - Dr. Dejan Žujović"	1,028	5.97	2
Enough Politics–Savski Venac Is Ours (Green Party of Serbia, Civic Party of Greeks of Serbia)	516	3.00	1
Citizens' Group: We Are People From Savski Venac	506	2.94	–
Total	17,209	100.00	37
Valid votes	17,209	96.92	
Invalid/blank votes	547	3.08	
Total votes	17,756	100.00	
Registered voters/turnout	39,997	44.39	

Fifteen of the eighteen candidates elected on the Savski Venac Tomorrow list were endorsed by the Serbian Progressive Party, two by the Socialist Party of Serbia, and one by the Serbian Radical Party.

Of the sixteen candidates elected on the We Choose Savski Venac list, five each were endorsed by the Green–Left Front and the People's Movement of Serbia, three by the Democratic Party, two by the Movement of Free Citizens, and one by the New Face of Serbia. Parliamentarian Ana Jakovljević of the People's Movement of Serbia appeared in the eighteenth position on the list and narrowly missed election.

The delegate elected on the Enough Politics list held an endorsement from the Civic Party of Greeks of Serbia.

In the aftermath of the vote, it was noted that the Progressive Party's alliance and the combined opposition of We Choose Savski Venac and For a Green Savski Venac each won eighteen seats. Some commentators speculated that the delegate from the Civic Party of Greeks of Serbia would play the role of kingmaker. Incumbent mayor Miloš Vidović of the Progressive Party was ultimately confirmed for another term in office on 12 July 2024.

===== Sopot =====
Results of the election for the municipal assembly of Sopot:

Party	Votes	%	Seats
Aleksandar Vučić—Sopot Tomorrow (Ivica Dačić-Socialist Party of Serbia-SPS; Dr. Vojislav Šešelj-Serbian Radical Party-SRS; Miloš Vučević-Serbian Progressive Party-SNS)	5,587	67.41	23
Citizens' Group: Together for Our Sopot	2,381	28.73	9
Milica Đurđević Stamenkovski-Serbian Party Oathkeepers	320	3.86	1
Total	8,288	100.00	33
Valid votes	8,288	96.86	
Invalid/blank votes	269	3.14	
Total votes	8,557	100.00	
Registered voters/turnout	17,270	49.55	

Twenty of the twenty-three candidates elected on the Sopot Tomorrow list were endorsed by the Serbian Progressive Party, two by the Socialist Party of Serbia, and one by the Serbian Radical Party.

Živorad Milosavljević of the Progressive Party, the longest continuously serving mayor in Serbia, was confirmed for his eleventh consecutive term in office on 11 July 2024.

===== Stari Grad =====
Results of the election for the municipal assembly of Stari Grad:

Party	Votes	%	Seats
We Choose Stari Grad–Radomir Lazović (Green–Left Front, Do not let Belgrade drown, People's Movement of Serbia, Democratic Party, Ecological Uprising–Ćuta, Movement of Free Citizens, New Face of Serbia)	8,767	37.85	23
Aleksandar Vučić—Stari Grad Tomorrow (Ivica Dačić-Socialist Party of Serbia-SPS; Dr. Vojislav Šešelj-Serbian Radical Party-SRS; Milica Đurđević Stamenkovski-Serbian Party Oathkeepers-OATHKEEPERS; Miloš Vučević-Serbian Progressive Party-SNS)	8,241	35.58	21
Citizens' Group: Guardians of the Old Town–Marko Bastać	3,873	16.72	10
"For a Green Stari Grad–When, If Not Now - Dr. Dejan Žujović" (European Green Party)	749	3.23	1
People's List–The Key to Victory (People's Party–Vladimir Gajić, Serbian Movement Dveri–Boško Obradović, I Live For Serbia Movement–Dr. Jovana Stojković)	739	3.19	1
Saša Radulović–Enough Is Enough (DJB)–A Solution for Change	681	2.94	–
Stari Grad Is Sacred–Justice and Reconciliation Party	111	0.48	–
Total	23,161	100.00	56
Valid votes	23,161	97.75	
Invalid/blank votes	532	2.25	
Total votes	23,693	100.00	
Registered voters/turnout	53,510	44.28	

Ten of the twenty-three candidates elected on the We Choose Stari Grad list were endorsed by the Green–Left Front, six by the People's Movement of Serbia, three each by the Democratic Party and the Movement of Free Citizens, and one by the New Face of Serbia.

Sixteen of the twenty-one candidates elected on the Stari Grad Tomorrow list were endorsed by the Serbian Progressive Party, three by the Socialist Party of Serbia, and one each by the Serbian Party Oathkeepers and the Serbian Radical Party.

The candidate elected on the Key to Victory list was endorsed by the People's Party.

The results of the election left Marko Bastać in the role of kingmaker. He ultimately aligned his political movement with the Progressives, and on 9 July 2024 he was chosen as president (i.e., speaker) of the municipal assembly. Incumbent mayor Radoslav Marjanović of the Progressives was confirmed for another term in office on 31 July 2024, in a vote that was boycotted by the opposition.

===== Surčin =====
Results of the election for the municipal assembly of Surčin:

Party	Votes	%	Seats
Aleksandar Vučić—Surčin Tomorrow (Ivica Dačić-Socialist Party of Serbia-SPS; Dr. Vojislav Šešelj-Serbian Radical Party-SRS; Milica Đurđević Stamenkovski-Serbian Party Oathkeepers-OATHKEEPERS; Miloš Vučević-Serbian Progressive Party-SNS)	14,740	73.21	26
We Choose Surčin–Vojislav Janošević (Green–Left Front, Do not let Belgrade drown, People's Movement of Serbia, Democratic Party, Ecological Uprising–Ćuta, Movement of Free Citizens, New Face of Serbia)	2,899	14.40	5
"We – Power of the People, Prof. Dr. Branimir Nestorović–Surčin"	1,964	9.75	3
I Am Surčin, You Are Surčin–Start the Changes! (European Green Party)	531	2.64	1
Total	20,134	100.00	35
Valid votes	20,134	97.82	
Invalid/blank votes	449	2.18	
Total votes	20,583	100.00	
Registered voters/turnout	39,836	51.67	

Twenty-one of the twenty-six candidates elected on the Surčin Tomorrow list were endorsed by the Serbian Progressive Party, three by the Socialist Party of Serbia, and one each by the Serbian Party Oathkeepers and the Serbian Radical Party.

Three of the five candidates elected on the We Choose Surčin list were endorsed by the Democratic Party and one each by the New Face of Serbia and the People's Movement of Serbia.

Miloš Dangubić of the Serbian Progressive Party was chosen as the municipality's mayor on 10 July 2024.

===== Voždovac =====
Results of the election for the municipal assembly of Voždovac:

Party	Votes	%	Seats
Aleksandar Vučić—Voždovac Tomorrow (Ivica Dačić-Socialist Party of Serbia-SPS; Rasim Ljajić-Social Democratic Party of Serbia-SDP Serbia; Milan Krkobabić-Party of United Pensioners, Farmers, and Proletarians of Serbia – Solidarity and Justice-PUPS – Solidarity and Justice; Dr. Vojislav Šešelj-Serbian Radical Party-SRS; Aleksandar Vulin-Movement of Socialists-PS; Nenad Popović-Serbian People's Party-SNP; Milica Đurđević Stamenkovski-Serbian Party Oathkeepers-OATHKEEPERS; Andreja Mladenović-Independent Serbian Party-Samostalna; Ivan Karić-Greens of Serbia-ZS; Miloš Vučević-Serbian Progressive Party-SNS)	39,651	55.25	33
Citizens' Group: Dr. Savo Manojlović–I'm Voždovac Too–Go-Change	16,381	22.82	13
We Choose Voždovac–Doc. Dr. Biljana Đorđević–Nikola Ignjatović (Green–Left Front, Do not let Belgrade drown, People's Movement of Serbia, Democratic Party, Ecological Uprising–Ćuta, Movement of Free Citizens, New Face of Serbia)	9,108	12.69	7
Citizens' Group: "We Voice for Voždovac–Dr. Dragan Kostić"	2,623	3.65	2
Citizens' Group: "For a Green Voždovac–When, If Not Now - Dr. Dejan Žujović"	2,017	2.81	–
Voždovac Our Land–People's Party–Vladimir Gajić, Serbian Movement Dveri–Boško Obradović–I Live for Serbia Movement, Dr. Jovana Stojković	1,992	2.78	–
Total	71,772	100.00	55
Valid votes	71,772	96.62	
Invalid/blank votes	2,512	3.38	
Total votes	74,284	100.00	
Registered voters/turnout	162,004	45.85	

Twenty-five of the thirty-three candidates elected on the Voždovac Tomorrow list were endorsed by the Serbian Progressive Party, five by the Socialist Party of Serbia, and one each by the Movement of Socialists, the Serbian Party Oathkeepers, and the Serbian Radical Party.

Three of the seven candidates elected on the We Choose Voždovac list were endorsed by the People's Movement of Serbia and two each by the Democratic Party and the Green–Left Front.

Bojana Jakšić of the Progressive Party was chosen as mayor on 11 July 2024.

===== Vračar =====
Results of the election for the municipal assembly of Vračar:

Party	Votes	%	Seats
We Choose Vračar–Miloš Pavlović (Green–Left Front, Do not let Belgrade drown, People's Movement of Serbia, Democratic Party, Ecological Uprising–Ćuta, Movement of Free Citizens, New Face of Serbia)	12,255	42.52	27
Aleksandar Vučić—Vračar Tomorrow (Ivica Dačić-Socialist Party of Serbia-SPS; Rasim Ljajić-Social Democratic Party of Serbia-SDP Serbia; Milan Krkobabić-Party of United Pensioners, Farmers, and Proletarians of Serbia – Solidarity and Justice-PUPS – Solidarity and Justice; Dr. Vojislav Šešelj-Serbian Radical Party-SRS; Aleksandar Vulin-Movement of Socialists-PS; Milica Đurđević Stamenkovski-Serbian Party Oathkeepers-OATHKEEPERS; Ivan Karić-Greens of Serbia-ZS; Miloš Vučević-Serbian Progressive Party-SNS)	11,263	39.08	25
Citizens' Group: Vračar Vračarians–Association for Beautification of Vračar	1,315	4.56	3
Green Movement Vračar–For Greener, Cleaner, and Happier Vračar (Green Party of Serbia)	1,181	4.10	2
People's List–The Key to Victory–Vračar (People's Party–Vladimir Gajić–Serbian Movement Dveri–Boško Obradović–I Live For Serbia Movement–Dr. Jovana Stojković)	962	3.34	2
Saša Radulović–Enough Is Enough (DJB)–A Solution for Change	928	3.22	2
We Are Vračar (European Green Party)	582	2.02	1
The Fight for the Liberation of Vračar–To Restore Democracy, Civil Rights, and Respect for Minorities–To Feel FREE in Vračar–Coalition STRENGTH (Bosniak Civic Party, Party of Montenegrins, Civic Party of Greeks of Serbia)	336	1.17	1
Total	28,822	100.00	63
Valid votes	28,822	97.52	
Invalid/blank votes	732	2.48	
Total votes	29,554	100.00	
Registered voters/turnout	62,749	47.10	

The initial results showed the We Choose Vračar coalition winning twenty-eight mandates and the Vračar Vračarians, who had been aligned with the Progressives in the previous assembly, winning two. We Choose Vračar charged that one of their mandates was illegitimately shifted to the Vračar Vračarians in a review of the ballots.

Ten of the twenty-seven candidates who were ultimately declared elected on the We Choose Vračar list were endorsed by the Green–Left Front, seven by the People's Movement of Serbia, six by the Democratic Party, and two each by the Movement of Free Citizens and the New Face of Serbia.

Twenty-two of the twenty-five candidates elected on the Vračar Tomorrow list were endorsed by the Serbian Progressive Party and three by the Socialist Party of Serbia.

Both candidates elected on the Key to Victory list were endorsed by the People's Party. The candidate elected on the Fight for the Liberation of Vračar list was endorsed by the Bosniak Civic Party.

Jovan Hadži Đokić of the Progressive Party was chosen as president (i.e., speaker) of the municipal assembly on 8 July 2024, with support from the Progressive–Socialist alliance, the Vračar Vračarians, the Green Party of Serbia, the People's Party (which had previously been considered part of the opposition), the European Green Party, and the Bosniak Civic Party. Incumbent mayor Milan Nedeljković of the Progressive Party was confirmed for another term in office later in the same session.

===== Zemun =====
Results of the election for the municipal assembly of Zemun:

Party	Votes	%	Seats
Aleksandar Vučić—Zemun Tomorrow (Ivica Dačić-Socialist Party of Serbia-SPS; Milan Krkobabić-Party of United Pensioners, Farmers, and Proletarians of Serbia – Solidarity and Justice-PUPS – Solidarity and Justice; Dr. Vojislav Šešelj-Serbian Radical Party-SRS; Aleksandar Vulin-Movement of Socialists-PS; Nenad Popović-Serbian People's Party-SNP; Milica Đurđević Stamenkovski-Serbian Party Oathkeepers-OATHKEEPERS; Andreja Mladenović-Independent Serbian Party-Samostalna; Miloš Vučević-Serbian Progressive Party-SNS)	43,122	57.01	35
Citizens' Group: Dr. Savo Manojlović–I'm Zemun Too–Go-Change–I'm Batajnica Too–Milan Ljutovac	16,942	22.40	14
We Choose Zemun–Larisa Ilijin (Green–Left Front, Do not let Belgrade drown, People's Movement of Serbia, Democratic Party, Ecological Uprising–Ćuta, Movement of Free Citizens, New Face of Serbia)	6,316	8.35	5
Citizens' Group: We – A Voice from Zemun	2,777	3.67	2
People's List for Zemun (People's Party–Vladimir Gajić–I Live For Serbia Movement–Dr. Jovana Stojković)	1,899	2.51	–
Citizens' Group: Enough of Robbery, Corruption, and Thievery–Radulović Milorad	1,309	1.73	–
Citizens' Group: "Zemun Against Violence–Dragana Radivojević"	1,163	1.54	–
Russian Party–The Fight for Zemun–Serbs and Russians Are Brothers Forever!	1,078	1.43	1
Citizens' Group: Let's Start–Let's Turn Zemun Around	1,039	1.37	–
Total	75,645	100.00	57
Valid votes	75,645	97.65	
Invalid/blank votes	1,818	2.35	
Total votes	77,463	100.00	
Registered voters/turnout	169,069	45.82	

Twenty-seven of the thirty-five candidates elected on the Zemun Tomorrow list were endorsed by the Serbian Progressive Party, four by the Socialist Party of Serbia, and one each by the Movement of Socialists, the Party of United Pensioners of Serbia, the Serbian Party Oathkeepers, and the Serbian Radical Party. Aleksandar Šešelj, the Radical Party candidate who was elected, resigned his seat on 8 July 2024, the day that the assembly convened.

Three of the five candidates elected on the We Choose Zemun list were endorsed by the People's Movement of Serbia. The other two were endorsed by the Green–Left Front.

Both of the candidates elected on the People's List for Zemun list were endorsed by the People's Party.

Incumbent mayor Gavrilo Kovačević of the Progressive Party was confirmed for another term in office on 8 July 2024.

===== Zvezdara =====
Results of the election for the municipal assembly of Zvezdara:

Party	Votes	%	Seats
Aleksandar Vučić—Zvezdara Tomorrow (Ivica Dačić-Socialist Party of Serbia-SPS; Rasim Ljajić-Social Democratic Party of Serbia-SDP Serbia; Milan Krkobabić-Party of United Pensioners, Farmers, and Proletarians of Serbia – Solidarity and Justice-PUPS – Solidarity and Justice; Dragan Marković Palma-United Serbia-JS; Dr. Vojislav Šešelj-Serbian Radical Party-SRS; Aleksandar Vulin-Movement of Socialists-PS; Nenad Popović-Serbian People's Party-SNP; Milica Đurđević Stamenkovski-Serbian Party Oathkeepers-OATHKEEPERS; Andreja Mladenović-Independent Serbian Party-Samostalna; Ivan Karić-Greens of Serbia-ZS; Miloš Vučević-Serbian Progressive Party-SNS)	33,720	50.19	28
We Choose Zvezdara–Marija Mijatović (Green–Left Front, Do not let Belgrade drown, People's Movement of Serbia, Democratic Party, Ecological Uprising–Ćuta, Movement of Free Citizens, New Face of Serbia)	20,140	29.97	17
Saša Radulović–Enough Is Enough–A Solution for Change	3,782	5.63	3
Citizens' Group: "For a Green Zvezdara–When, If Not Now - Dr. Dejan Žujović"	3,666	5.46	3
Citizens' Group: We Are People of Zvezdara	2,598	3.87	2
Citizens' Group: For Our Zvezdara	1,794	2.67	–
Coalition: People's List–The Key to Victory–"Zvezdara" (People's Party, Dveri)	1,490	2.22	–
Total	67,190	100.00	53
Valid votes	67,190	96.02	
Invalid/blank votes	2,783	3.98	
Total votes	69,973	100.00	
Registered voters/turnout	162,232	43.13	

Twenty-two of the twenty-eight candidates elected on the Zvezdara Tomorrow list were endorsed by the Serbian Progressive Party, four by the Socialist Party of Serbia, and one each by the Serbian Party Oathkeepers and the Serbian Radical Party.

Six of the seventeen candidates elected on the We Choose Zvezdara list were endorsed by the Green–Left Front, five by the People's Movement of Serbia, three by the Democratic Party, two by the Movement of Free Citizens, and one by the New Face of Serbia.

The first two positions on the Key to Victory list were assigned to members of the People's Party. Radmila Vasić of Dveri appeared in the third position.

Mihailo Dosković of the Progressive Party was chosen as mayor on 10 July 2024.

=== Vojvodina ===
==== Central Banat District ====
Local elections were held in the one city (i.e., Zrenjanin) and three of the four other municipalities of the Central Banat District. The exception was Sečanj, where the previous local election had been held in 2022.

The Progressive Party and its allies won majority victories in all jurisdictions that held elections.

===== Zrenjanin =====
Results of the election for the city assembly of Zrenjanin:

Party	Votes	%	Seats
Aleksandar Vučić—Zrenjanin Tomorrow (Ivica Dačić-Socialist Party of Serbia-SPS; Rasim Ljajić–Social Democratic Party of Serbia–SDP Serbia; Milan Krkobabić-Party of United Pensioners, Farmers, and Proletarians of Serbia – Solidarity and Justice-PUPS – Solidarity and Justice; Dr. Vojislav Šešelj-Serbian Radical Party-SRS; Aleksandar Vulin-Movement of Socialists-PS; Milica Đurđević Stamenkovski-Serbian Party Oathkeepers-OATHKEEPERS; Miloš Vučević-Serbian Progressive Party-SNS)	27,103	59.37	41
Both Water and Freedom–NADA–United Opposition of Zrenjanin (Party of Freedom and Justice, New Democratic Party of Serbia, Movement of Free Citizens, Movement for the Restoration of the Kingdom of Serbia, Change in Focus "PUF", Movement for Reversal, United Trade Unions of Serbia "Sloga", Be a Hero)	8,015	17.56	12
Zrenjanin Against Violence–We Choose Zrenjanin (Democratic Party, Green–Left Front, League of Social Democrats of Vojvodina–VOJVODINIANS, People's Movement of Serbia, New Face of Serbia, Serbia Centre)	6,506	14.25	9
We – Power of the People, Prof. Dr. Branimir Nestorović–Zrenjanin	2,383	5.22	3
Alliance of Vojvodina Hungarians–Dr. Bálint Pásztor	1,644	3.60	2
Total	45,651	100.00	67
Valid votes	45,651	97.63	
Invalid/blank votes	1,108	2.37	
Total votes	46,759	100.00	
Registered voters/turnout	99,463	47.01	

Thirty-three of the forty-one candidates elected on the Zrenjanin Tomorrow list were endorsed by the Serbian Progressive Party, three by the Socialist Party of Serbia, and one each by the Movement of Socialists, the PUPS, the Serbian Party Oathkeepers, the Serbian Radical Party, and the Social Democratic Party of Serbia.

Six of the twelve candidates elected on the Both Water and Freedom list were endorsed by the Party of Freedom and Justice, five by the New Democratic Party of Serbia, and one by the Movement for the Restoration of the Kingdom of Serbia. Three candidates each elected on the Zrenjanin Against Violence list were endorsed by the Democratic Party and the League of Social Democrats of Vojvodina, and one each was endorsed by the Green–Left Front, the People's Movement of Serbia, and Serbia Centre.

Incumbent mayor Simo Salapura of the Progressives was confirmed for a new term in office on 12 July 2024.

===== Nova Crnja =====
Results of the election for the municipal assembly of Nova Crnja:

Party	Votes	%	Seats
Aleksandar Vučić—Nova Crnja Tomorrow (Ivica Dačić-Socialist Party of Serbia-SPS; Rasim Ljajić–Social Democratic Party of Serbia–SDP Serbia; Milan Krkobabić-Party of United Pensioners, Farmers, and Proletarians of Serbia – Solidarity and Justice-PUPS – Solidarity and Justice; Dr. Vojislav Šešelj-Serbian Radical Party-SRS; Miloš Vučević-Serbian Progressive Party-SNS)	3,675	77.71	20
Citizens' Group: To Know the Order	636	13.45	3
Alliance of Vojvodina Hungarians–Dr. Bálint Pásztor	418	8.84	2
Total	4,729	100.00	25
Valid votes	4,729	94.79	
Invalid/blank votes	260	5.21	
Total votes	4,989	100.00	
Registered voters/turnout	7,941	62.83	

Eighteen of the twenty candidates elected on the Nova Crnja Tomorrow list were endorsed by the Serbian Progressive Party. The other two were endorsed by the Socialist Party of Serbia.

Former parliamentarian Attila Juhász appeared in the twelfth position on the VMSZ's list and was not elected.

Dragan Daničić of the Progressives was chosen as mayor on 11 July 2024.

===== Novi Bečej =====
Results of the election for the municipal assembly of Novi Bečej:

Party	Votes	%	Seats
Aleksandar Vučić—Novi Bečej Tomorrow (Ivica Dačić-Socialist Party of Serbia-SPS; Rasim Ljajić–Social Democratic Party of Serbia–SDP Serbia; Milan Krkobabić-Party of United Pensioners, Farmers, and Proletarians of Serbia – Solidarity and Justice-PUPS – Solidarity and Justice; Dr. Vojislav Šešelj-Serbian Radical Party-SRS; Milica Đurđević Stamenkovski-Serbian Party Oathkeepers-OATHKEEPERS; Miloš Vučević-Serbian Progressive Party-SNS)	5,262	55.04	18
Aleksandar Vulin–Movement of Socialists–PS–Ivica Milankov	1,825	19.09	6
United Opposition–We Choose Novi Bečej Against Violence (People's Movement of Serbia, Democratic Party)	1,050	10.98	3
Do You Want Changes? Just Circle Here!–Vojvodinians	815	8.52	2
Alliance of Vojvodina Hungarians–Dr. Bálint Pásztor (Alliance of Vojvodina Hungarians, Democratic Party of Vojvodina Hungarians, Hungarian Unity Party)	609	6.37	2
Total	9,561	100.00	31
Valid votes	9,561	96.20	
Invalid/blank votes	378	3.80	
Total votes	9,939	100.00	
Registered voters/turnout	18,617	53.39	

Fifteen of the eighteen candidates elected on the Novi Bečej Tomorrow list were endorsed by the Serbian Progressive Party, two by the Socialist Party of Serbia, and one by the Social Democratic Party of Serbia.

Ivica Milankov was elected from the lead position on the Movement of Socialists list.

Two of the candidates elected on the We Choose Novi Bečej Against Violence list were endorsed by the People's Movement of Serbia. One was endorsed by the Democratic Party.

Both candidates elected on the Alliance of Vojvodina Hungarians list were endorsed by the Alliance of Vojvodina Hungarians.

Incumbent mayor Saša Maksimović of the Progressives was confirmed for another term in office on 12 July 2024. The Progressives formed a coalition government with the Movement of Socialists and the Alliance of Vojvodina Hungarians.

===== Sečanj =====
There was no election for the municipal assembly of Sečanj in 2024. The previous election took place in 2022.

===== Žitište =====
Results of the election for the municipal assembly of Žitište:

Party	Votes	%	Seats
Aleksandar Vučić—Žitište Tomorrow (Ivica Dačić-Socialist Party of Serbia-SPS; Rasim Ljajić–Social Democratic Party of Serbia–SDP Serbia; Dr. Vojislav Šešelj-Serbian Radical Party-SRS; Miloš Vučević-Serbian Progressive Party-SNS)	4,818	67.38	21
United for the Municipality of Žitište (Democratic Party, New Democratic Party of Serbia, People's Movement of Serbia, Movement of Free Citizens, Serbia Centre, League of Social Democrats of Vojvodina–VOJVODINIANS, Movement for the Restoration of the Kingdom of Serbia	1,386	19.38	6
Alliance of Vojvodina Hungarians–Dr. Bálint Pásztor	946	13.23	4
Total	7,150	100.00	31
Valid votes	7,150	95.97	
Invalid/blank votes	300	4.03	
Total votes	7,450	100.00	
Registered voters/turnout	13,544	55.01	
Source: Local election commission

Seventeen of the twenty-one candidates elected on the Žitište Tomorrow list were endorsed by the Serbian Progressive Party, three by the Socialist Party of Serbia, and one by the Social Democratic Party of Serbia.

One candidate each from the Democratic Party, the New Democratic Party of Serbia, the People's Movement of Serbia, the Movement of Free Citizens, Serbia Centre, and the League of Social Democrats of Vojvodina was elected on the United for the Municipality of Žitište list.

Ivana Petrić of the Progressives was chosen as mayor on 12 July 2024.

==== North Bačka District ====
Local elections were held in the one city (Subotica) both of the municipalities of the North Bačka District. The Serbian Progressive Party and its allies won majority victories Subotica and Mali Iđoš, and the Alliance of Vojvodina Hungarians won in the predominantly Hungarian community of Bačka Topola. In all three jurisdictions, the Progressives and the Alliance of Vojvodina Hungarians formed coalition governments after the election.

===== Subotica =====
Results of the election for the city assembly of Subotica:

Party	Votes	%	Seats
Aleksandar Vučić—Subotica Tomorrow (Ivica Dačić-Socialist Party of Serbia-SPS; Aleksandar Vulin-Movement of Socialists-PS; Rasim Ljajić-Social Democratic Party of Serbia-SDP Serbia; Dr. Vojislav Šešelj-Serbian Radical Party-SRS; Milica Đurđević Stamenkovski-Serbian Party Oathkeepers-OATHKEEPERS; Milan Krkobabić-Party of United Pensioners, Farmers, and Proletarians of Serbia – Solidarity and Justice-PUPS – Solidarity and Justice; Miloš Vučević-Serbian Progressive Party-SNS)	25,893	51.29	35
Alliance of Vojvodina Hungarians–Dr. Bálint Pásztor	13,777	27.29	19
Subotica Against Violence–We Choose Subotica–Nela Tonković (Democratic Party, People's Movement of Serbia, League of Social Democrats of Vojvodina, Green–Left Front, Democratic Union of Croats)	7,721	15.29	10
For a Just Subotica–Democratic Alliance of Croats in Vojvodina–Justice and Reconciliation Party–Tomislav Žigmanov	2,182	4.32	3
For a Cultural Subotica	913	1.81	–
Total	50,486	100.00	67
Valid votes	50,486	96.19	
Invalid/blank votes	1,998	3.81	
Total votes	52,484	100.00	
Registered voters/turnout	125,458	41.83	

Twenty-nine of the thirty-five candidates elected on the Subotica Tomorrow list were endorsed by the Serbian Progressive Party, two were endorsed by the Socialist Party of Serbia, and one each was endorsed by the Movement of Socialists, the PUPS, the Serbian Radical Party, and the Social Democratic Party of Serbia.

Alliance of Vojvodina Hungarians leader Bálint Pásztor was re-elected to the city assembly from the lead position on that party's list; Dániel Gyivánovity was elected from the second position. Pásztor resigned his seat when the new assembly convened on 10 July 2024, saying that he wanted to focus on his work in the national assembly and as party leader.

Three candidates each elected on the Subotica Against Violence list were endorsed by the Democratic Party and the People's Movement of Serbia, two were endorsed by the League of Social Democrats of Vojvodina, and one each was endorsed by the Democratic Union of Croats and the Green–Left Front.

All three candidates elected on the For a Just Subotica list were endorsed by the Democratic Alliance of Croats in Vojvodina.

Incumbent mayor Stevan Bakić of the Progressives was confirmed for a new term in office on 10 July 2024. Dániel Gyivánovity of the Alliance of Vojvodina Hungarians was chosen as president of the assembly.

===== Bačka Topola =====
Results of the election for the municipal assembly of Bačka Topola:

Party	Votes	%	Seats
Alliance of Vojvodina Hungarians–Dr. Bálint Pásztor (Alliance of Vojvodina Hungarians, Democratic Party of Vojvodina Hungarians, Hungarian Unity Party)	7,072	53.36	19
Aleksandar Vučić—Bačka Topola Tomorrow (Ivica Dačić-Socialist Party of Serbia-SPS; Miloš Vučević-Serbian Progressive Party-SNS)	4,872	36.76	13
Bačka Topola The Day After Tomorrow (People's Movement of Serbia-NPS, Party of Freedom and Justice-SSP, Democratic Party-DS, Green–Left Front-ZLF, Democratic Fellowship of Vojvodina Hungarians-VMDK)	1,309	9.88	3
Total	13,253	100.00	35
Valid votes	13,253	97.53	
Invalid/blank votes	336	2.47	
Total votes	13,589	100.00	
Registered voters/turnout	27,329	49.72	

Eighteen of the nineteen candidates elected on the Alliance of Vojvodina Hungarians list were endorsed by the Alliance of Vojvodina Hungarians. The other candidate was endorsed by the Democratic Party of Vojvodina Hungarians. Árpád Fremond, the leader of Serbia's Hungarian National Council and a former Alliance of Vojvodina Hungarians parliamentarian, appeared in the symbolic final position on the list.

Twelve of the thirteen candidates elected on the Bačka Topola Tomorrow list were endorsed by the Serbian Progressive Party. The other candidate was endorsed by the Socialist Party of Serbia.

One candidate each elected on the Bačka Topola The Day After Tomorrow list was endorsed by the Green–Left Front, the Party of Freedom and Justice, and the People's Movement of Serbia.

Incumbent mayor Adrián Szatmári of the Alliance of Vojvodina Hungarians was confirmed for another term in office on 12 July 2024. A member of the Serbian Progressive Party was chosen as deputy mayor.

===== Mali Iđoš =====
Results of the election for the municipal assembly of Mali Iđoš:

Party	Votes	%	Seats
Aleksandar Vučić—Mali Iđoš Tomorrow (Ivica Dačić-Socialist Party of Serbia-SPS; Miloš Vučević-Serbian Progressive Party-SNS)	3,043	52.46	13
Alliance of Vojvodina Hungarians–Dr. Bálint Pásztor	2,503	43.15	11
Čojski i Cojski–Montenegrin Party	255	4.40	1
Total	5,801	100.00	25
Valid votes	5,801	97.15	
Invalid/blank votes	170	2.85	
Total votes	5,971	100.00	
Registered voters/turnout	9,932	60.12	

Twelve of the thirteen candidates elected on the Mali Iđoš Tomorrow list were endorsed by the Serbian Progressive Party. The other candidate was endorsed by the Socialist Party of Serbia.

The Progressives formed a coalition government with the Alliance of Vojvodina Hungarians after the election. Incumbent mayor Marko Lazić of the Progressives was confirmed for another term in office on 10 July 2024.

==== North Banat District ====
Local elections were held in the one city (Kikinda) and all five municipalities of the North Banat District. The Progressive Party won majority victories in Kikinda, Ada, Čoka, and Novi Kneževac, while the Alliance of Vojvodina Hungarians won a majority victory in Kanjiža and a plurality victory in Senta.

In all three municipalities with a Hungarian majority (Ada, Kanjiža, and Senta), the Serbian Progressive Party and the Alliance of Vojvodina Hungarians formed a coalition government after the election.

===== Kikinda =====
Results of the election for the city assembly of Kikinda:

Party	Votes	%	Seats
Aleksandar Vučić—Kikinda Tomorrow (Ivica Dačić-Socialist Party of Serbia-SPS; Rasim Ljajić-Social Democratic Party of Serbia-SDP Serbia; Milan Krkobabić-Party of United Pensioners, Farmers, and Proletarians of Serbia – Solidarity and Justice-PUPS – Solidarity and Justice; Dr. Vojislav Šešelj-Serbian Radical Party-SRS; Aleksandar Vulin-Movement of Socialists-PS; Milica Đurđević Stamenkovski-Serbian Party Oathkeepers-OATHKEEPERS; Miloš Vučević-Serbian Progressive Party-SNS)	15,507	68.15	28
Choose Change–United Opposition of Kikinda–Mirko Šoć (League of Social Democrats of Vojvodina–VOJVODINIANS, Party of Freedom and Justice, Movement for the Restoration of the Kingdom of Serbia, People's Movement of Serbia, Serbian Movement Dveri, Social Democratic Party, Serbia Centre, Democratic Fellowship of Vojvodina Hungarians)	3,388	14.89	6
Coalition: I Choose the Fight! I Choose Kikinda! Democratic Party, Green–Left Front, Movement of Free Citizens	1,774	7.80	3
Alliance of Vojvodina Hungarians–Dr. Bálint Pásztor	1,415	6.22	2
Kikinda Against Violence–Milorad Miki Aleksić	669	2.94	–
Total	22,753	100.00	39
Valid votes	22,753	97.02	
Invalid/blank votes	700	2.98	
Total votes	23,453	100.00	
Registered voters/turnout	46,881	50.03	

Twenty-five of the twenty-eight candidates elected on the Kikinda Tomorrow list were endorsed by the Serbian Progressive Party. Two were endorsed by the Socialist Party of Serbia, and one was endorsed by the Serbian Radical Party.

One candidate each elected on the Choose Change list was endorsed by the League of Social Democrats of Vojvodina, the Movement for the Restoration of the Kingdom of Serbia, the Party of Freedom and Justice, the People's Movement of Serbia, Serbia Centre, and the Social Democratic Party.

One candidate each elected on the I Choose the Fight! I Choose Kikinda! list was endorsed by the Democratic Party, the Green–Left Front, and the Movement of Free Citizens.

Incumbent mayor Nikola Lukač of the Progressives was chosen for a new term in office on 10 July 2024. He resigned on 4 October 2024 and was replaced by Mladen Bogdan, also of the Progressives.

===== Ada =====
Results of the election for the municipal assembly of Ada:

Party	Votes	%	Seats
Aleksandar Vučić—Ada Tomorrow (Ivica Dačić-Socialist Party of Serbia-SPS; Miloš Vučević-Serbian Progressive Party-SNS)	4,752	62.90	19
Alliance of Vojvodina Hungarians–Dr. Bálint Pásztor	2,485	32.89	9
VDMK–Áron Csonka (DZVM)	318	4.21	1
Total	7,555	100.00	29
Valid votes	7,555	97.81	
Invalid/blank votes	169	2.19	
Total votes	7,724	100.00	
Registered voters/turnout	14,533	53.15	

According to a list posted by the Ada municipal election commission, seven of the nineteen candidates elected on the Ada Tomorrow list were endorsed by the Serbian Progressive Party, and one was endorsed by the Socialist Party of Serbia. The remaining eleven candidates are not listed as having held any party endorsement.

Also according to a list posted by the Ada municipal election commission, seven candidates elected on the Alliance of Vojvodina Hungarians list were endorsed by the party, and the remaining two did not carry a party endorsement. Former parliamentarian Nándor Kiss appeared in the eighteenth position on the party's list.

Incumbent mayor Zoltán Bilicki of the Progressives was confirmed for another term in office on 10 July 2024.

===== Čoka =====
Results of the election for the municipal assembly of Čoka:

Party	Votes	%	Seats
Aleksandar Vučić—Čoka Tomorrow (Ivica Dačić-Socialist Party of Serbia-SPS; Miloš Vučević-Serbian Progressive Party-SNS)	2,676	57.77	15
Alliance of Vojvodina Hungarians–Dr. Bálint Pásztor	1,585	34.22	8
United for Čoka NPS, VDMK (NPS, DZVM)	371	8.01	2
Total	4,632	100.00	25
Valid votes	4,632	96.36	
Invalid/blank votes	175	3.64	
Total votes	4,807	100.00	
Registered voters/turnout	8,777	54.77	

Fourteen of the fifteen candidates elected on the Čoka Tomorrow list were endorsed by the Serbian Progressive Party, and one was endorsed by the Socialist Party of Serbia.

One candidate each on the United for Čoka list was endorsed by the Democratic Fellowship of Vojvodina Hungarians and the People's Movement of Serbia.

Incumbent mayor Stana Đember of the Progressives was confirmed for another term in office on 10 July 2024.

===== Kanjiža =====
Results of the election for the municipal assembly of Kanjiža:

Party	Votes	%	Seats
Alliance of Vojvodina Hungarians–Dr. Bálint Pásztor	6,214	63.98	19
Aleksandar Vučić—Kanjiža Tomorrow (Ivica Dačić-Socialist Party of Serbia-SPS; Miloš Vučević-Serbian Progressive Party-SNS)	2,739	28.20	8
I Choose Kanjiža–Vladimir Hajder, Movement of Free Citizens	759	7.82	2
Total	9,712	100.00	29
Valid votes	9,712	97.40	
Invalid/blank votes	259	2.60	
Total votes	9,971	100.00	
Registered voters/turnout	20,946	47.60	

Former parliamentarian Zsombor Újvári was elected from the second position on the Alliance of Vojvodina Hungarians list.

Seven of the eight candidates elected on the Kanžija Tomorrow list were endorsed by the Serbian Progressive Party, and one was endorsed by the Socialist Party of Serbia.

Incumbent mayor Róbert Fejsztámer of the Alliance of Vojvodina Hungarians was confirmed for another term in office on 10 July 2024. Zsombor Újvári, also of the Alliance of Vojvodina Hungarians, became president of the local assembly.

===== Novi Kneževac =====
Results of the election for the municipal assembly of Novi Kneževac:

Party	Votes	%	Seats
Aleksandar Vučić—Novi Kneževac Tomorrow (Ivica Dačić-Socialist Party of Serbia-SPS; Miloš Vučević-Serbian Progressive Party-SNS)	2,680	60.27	19
Alliance of Vojvodina Hungarians–Dr. Bálint Pásztor	1,387	31.19	10
I Choose the Fight! Novi Kneževac Against Violence (People's Movement of Serbia, Democratic Party)	380	8.55	2
Total	4,447	100.00	31
Valid votes	4,447	94.86	
Invalid/blank votes	241	5.14	
Total votes	4,688	100.00	
Registered voters/turnout	8,518	55.04	

Eighteen of the nineteen candidates elected on the Novi Kneževac Tomorrow list were endorsed by the Serbian Progressive Party. The other was endorsed by the Socialist Party of Serbia.

One candidate each elected on the Novi Kneževac Against Violence list was endorsed by the People's Movement of Serbia and the Democratic Party.

Incumbent mayor Radovan Uverić of the Progressives was confirmed for a new term in office on 10 July 2024.

===== Senta =====
Results of the election for the municipal assembly of Senta:

Party	Votes	%	Seats
Alliance of Vojvodina Hungarians–Dr. Bálint Pásztor	3,747	45.31	14
Aleksandar Vučić—Senta Tomorrow (Ivica Dačić-Socialist Party of Serbia-SPS; Miloš Vučević-Serbian Progressive Party-SNS)	2,539	30.71	9
Senta Deserves More–Goran Jovanović–Sándor Jozsef (People's Movement of Serbia, Hungarian Movement, VDMK-DZVM)	932	11.27	3
Citizens' Group: Together for a Better Senta–Žofia Sabo Dekanj	682	8.25	2
Senta for Sentians–László Rác Szabó (Hungarian Civic Alliance)	369	4.46	1
Total	8,269	100.00	29
Valid votes	8,269	97.34	
Invalid/blank votes	226	2.66	
Total votes	8,495	100.00	
Registered voters/turnout	19,562	43.43	

Eight of the nine delegates elected on the Senta Tomorrow list were endorsed by the Serbian Progressive Party, and one was endorsed by the Socialist Party of Serbia.

Both candidates elected on the Senta Deserves More list were endorsed by the People's Movement of Serbia.

Hajnalka Burány of the Alliance of Vojvodina Hungarians was chosen as mayor on 10 July 2024, and a member of the Progressives was chosen as president of the municipal assembly.

==== South Bačka District ====
Local elections were held in the one city (Novi Sad) and all eleven of the separate municipalities of the South Bačka District. The Serbian Progressive Party and its allies won majority victories in all jurisdictions.

The city of Novi Sad comprises two municipalities (the city municipality of Novi Sad and Petrovaradin), although their powers are very limited relative to the city government. Unlike Belgrade, Niš, and Vranje, Novi Sad does not have directly elected municipal assemblies.

===== Novi Sad =====
Results of the election for the city assembly of Novi Sad:

Party	Votes	%	Seats
Aleksandar Vučić—Novi Sad Tomorrow (Ivica Dačić-Socialist Party of Serbia-SPS; Rasim Ljajić-Social Democratic Party of Serbia-SDP Serbia; Milan Krkobabić-Party of United Pensioners, Farmers, and Proletarians of Serbia – Solidarity and Justice-PUPS – Solidarity and Justice; Milan Stamatović-Healthy Serbia-ZS; Dr. Vojislav Šešelj-Serbian Radical Party-SRS; Aleksandar Vulin-Movement of Socialists-PS; Milica Đurđević Stamenkovski-Serbian Party Oathkeepers-OATHKEEPERS; Ivan Karić-Greens of Serbia-ZS; Miloš Vučević-Serbian Progressive Party-SNS)	87,791	53.72	45
United for a Free Novi Sad–Serbian Coalition NADA (New DSS, POKS)–Party of Freedom and Justice, People's Movement of Serbia, Democratic Party, Serbia Centre-SRCE, Movement of Free Citizens, Green–Left Front, Ecological Uprising–Ćuta, Movement for Reversal, Civic Movement "Bravo", League of Social Democrats of Vojvodina-VOJVODINIANS–Prof. Dr. Vladimir Vrsajkov, Borislav Novaković	40,541	24.81	21
Citizens' Group: Dr. Savo Manojlović–I'm Novi Sad Too–Go-Change	16,723	10.23	8
Citizens' Group: Heroes–Miša Bačulov	6,332	3.87	3
Alliance of Vojvodina Hungarians–Dr. Bálint Pásztor	2,062	1.26	1
I Love Novi Sad–Serbian Movement Dveri, Ivana Stojanović–People's Party, Aleksandar Maksimović–I Live for Serbia Movement, Dr. Jovana Stojković	1,747	1.07	–
Saša Radulović–Enough Is Enough (DJB)–A Solution for Change	1,467	0.90	–
Citizens' Group: A Completely Different Story–A City for the Citizens	1,461	0.89	–
Citizens' Group: Novi Sad, Capital of Vojvodina–Autonomous Movement–Aleksandar Odžić	1,386	0.85	–
Russian Party–Serbs and Russians Are Brothers Forever!	1,223	0.75	–
Truth–Adaviera–Ivana Vujasin	1,063	0.65	–
Citizens' Group: For the Right Things, Support GARI	717	0.44	–
Citizens' Group: Dad, This Is for You–Petar Đurić	565	0.35	–
Slovak Democratic Party–Želmira Privizer	359	0.22	–
Total	163,437	100.00	78
Valid votes	163,437	97.79	
Invalid/blank votes	3,698	2.21	
Total votes	167,135	100.00	
Registered voters/turnout	339,233	49.27	

Thirty-four of the forty-five candidates elected on the Novi Sad Tomorrow list were endorsed by the Serbian Progressive Party, five by the Socialist Party of Serbia, two by the Serbian Radical Party, and one each by the Movement of Socialists, the PUPS, the Serbian Party Oathkeepers, and the Social Democratic Party of Serbia.

Four candidates each elected on the United for a Free Novi Sad list were endorsed by Party of Freedom and Justice, the People's Movement of Serbia, and Serbia Centre. Three candidates were endorsed by the New Democratic Party of Serbia, two by the Democratic Party, and one each by the Green–Left Front, the League of Social Democrats of Vojvodina, the Movement for the Restoration of the Kingdom of Serbia, and the Movement of Free Citizens.

Incumbent mayor Milan Đurić of the Progressives was confirmed for a new term in office on 28 August 2024.

===== Bač =====
Results of the election for the municipal assembly of Bač:

Party	Votes	%	Seats
Aleksandar Vučić—Bač Tomorrow (Ivica Dačić-Socialist Party of Serbia-SPS; Rasim Ljajić-Social Democratic Party of Serbia-SDP Serbia; Dr. Vojislav Šešelj-Serbian Radical Party-SRS; Aleksandar Vulin-Movement of Socialists-PS; Dr. Bálint Pásztor–Alliance of Vojvodina Hungarians–SMV-VMSZ; Miloš Vučević-Serbian Progressive Party-SNS)	4,093	60.66	16
Citizens' Group: My Bač–Freedom For All–Zdravko Vulin Đađe	1,937	28.70	7
United Opposition of Bač–Let's Set Bač Free (Democratic Party, League of Social Democrats of Vojvodina–VOJVODINIANS, People's Movement of Serbia)	718	10.64	2
Total	6,748	100.00	25
Valid votes	6,748	96.91	
Invalid/blank votes	215	3.09	
Total votes	6,963	100.00	
Registered voters/turnout	12,049	57.79	

Thirteen of the sixteen candidates elected on the Bač Tomorrow list were endorsed by the Serbian Progressive Party, and one each was endorsed by the Alliance of Vojvodina Hungarians, the Serbian Radical Party, and the Socialist Party of Serbia.

One candidate elected on the United Opposition of Bač list was endorsed by the Democratic Party, and the other candidate was endorsed by the League of Social Democrats of Vojvodina.

Lela Milinović of the Progressives was chosen as mayor on 28 June 2024.

===== Bačka Palanka =====
Results of the election for the municipal assembly of Bačka Palanka:

Party	Votes	%	Seats
Aleksandar Vučić—Bačka Palanka Tomorrow (Ivica Dačić-Socialist Party of Serbia-SPS; Aleksandar Vulin-Movement of Socialists-PS; Milan Krkobabić-Party of United Pensioners, Farmers, and Proletarians of Serbia – Solidarity and Justice-PUPS – Solidarity and Justice; Dr. Bálint Pásztor–Alliance of Vojvodina Hungarians–SMV-VMSZ; Miloš Vučević-Serbian Progressive Party-SNS)	14,403	67.71	30
United Opposition of Bačka Palanka–Choose Better!–People's Movement of Serbia, Party of Freedom and Justice, Democratic Party, New Democratic Party of Serbia, Green–Left Front, New Face of Serbia	3,792	17.83	8
Dr. Vojislav Šešelj–Serbian Radical Party	1,726	8.11	3
Citizens' Group: Bačka Palanka Against Violence	657	3.09	–
Citizens' Group: We – Strength of Bačka Palanka	371	1.74	–
Russian Party–Serbs and Russians Are Brothers Forever!	323	1.52	–
Total	21,272	100.00	41
Valid votes	21,272	96.81	
Invalid/blank votes	700	3.19	
Total votes	21,972	100.00	
Registered voters/turnout	45,038	48.79	

Nineteen of the thirty candidates elected on the Bačka Palanka Tomorrow list were endorsed by the Serbian Progressive Party, seven by the Movement of Socialists, three by the Socialist Party of Serbia, and one by the Alliance of Vojvodina Hungarians.

Two candidates each elected on the United Opposition of Bačka Palanka list were endorsed by the Democratic Party, the Party of Freedom and Justice, and the People's Movement of Serbia. One candidate each was endorsed by the Green–Left Front and the New Democratic Party of Serbia.

Incumbent mayor Branislav Šušnica of the Progressives was confirmed for another term in office on 3 July 2024.

===== Bački Petrovac =====
Results of the election for the municipal assembly of Bački Petrovac:

Party	Votes	%	Seats
Aleksandar Vučić—Bački Petrovac Tomorrow (Ivica Dačić-Socialist Party of Serbia-SPS; Dragan Marković Palma–United Serbia–JS; Dr. Vojislav Šešelj-Serbian Radical Party-SRS; Miloš Vučević-Serbian Progressive Party-SNS)	3,564	64.02	16
I Choose the Fight–United Opposition of Bački Petrovac–Martina Martinko Sabolčki–Branislav Davidović–Marijan Triaška–Adrijana Abrahamova (Party of Freedom and Justice, People's Movement of Serbia, Movement for the Restoration of the Kingdom of Serbia)	1,513	27.18	7
Citizens' Group: Bački Petrovac Against Violence	271	4.87	1
Slovak Democratic League–Pavel Marčok	219	3.93	1
Total	5,567	100.00	25
Valid votes	5,567	95.74	
Invalid/blank votes	248	4.26	
Total votes	5,815	100.00	
Registered voters/turnout	11,670	49.83	

Fourteen of the sixteen candidates elected on the Bački Petrovac Tomorrow list were endorsed by the Serbian Progressive Party, and one each was endorsed by the Socialist Party of Serbia and United Serbia.

Four of the seven candidates elected on the United Opposition of Bački Petrovac list were endorsed by the Party of Freedom and Justice, and three were endorsed by the People's Movement of Serbia.

Viera Krstovski of the Progressives was chosen as mayor on 7 July 2024.

===== Bečej =====
Results of the election for the municipal assembly of Bečej:

Party	Votes	%	Seats
Aleksandar Vučić—Bečej Tomorrow (Ivica Dačić-Socialist Party of Serbia-SPS; Rasim Ljajić-Social Democratic Party of Serbia-SDP Serbia; Aleksandar Vulin-Movement of Socialists-PS; Dr. Vojislav Šešelj-Serbian Radical Party-SRS; Miloš Vučević-Serbian Progressive Party-SNS)	9,180	58.98	22
Alliance of Vojvodina Hungarians–Dr. Bálint Pásztor (Alliance of Vojvodina Hungarians, Democratic Party of Vojvodina Hungarians, Hungarian Unity Party)	3,806	24.45	9
Citizens' Group: Only Local–Milan Bokun	1,831	11.76	4
NADA for Bečej–All for Bečej–POKS–NDSS (Movement for the Restoration of the Kingdom of Serbia, New Democratic Party of Serbia)	747	4.80	1
Total	15,564	100.00	36
Valid votes	15,564	95.95	
Invalid/blank votes	657	4.05	
Total votes	16,221	100.00	
Registered voters/turnout	31,371	51.71	

Twenty-one of the twenty-two candidates elected on the Bečej Tomorrow list were endorsed by the Serbian Progressive Party. The other candidate was endorsed by the Socialist Party of Serbia.

Eight of the nine candidates elected on the Alliance of Vojvodina Hungarians list were endorsed by the Alliance of Vojvodina Hungarians. The other candidate was endorsed by the Democratic Party of Vojvodina Hungarians.

The candidate elected on the NADA for Bečej–All for Bečej list was endorsed by the Movement for the Restoration of the Kingdom of Serbia.

Incumbent mayor Vuk Radojević of the Progressives was confirmed for a new term in office on 10 July 2024.

===== Beočin =====
Results of the election for the municipal assembly of Beočin:

Party	Votes	%	Seats
Aleksandar Vučić—Beočin Tomorrow (Ivica Dačić-Socialist Party of Serbia-SPS; Rasim Ljajić-Social Democratic Party of Serbia-SDP Serbia; Dr. Vojislav Šešelj-Serbian Radical Party-SRS; Miloš Vučević-Serbian Progressive Party-SNS)	6,548	83.94	20
Beočin Against Violence–I Choose the Fight! Miroslav Aleksić (People's Movement of Serbia)	839	10.76	2
Citizens' Group: Beočin Against Violence	414	5.31	1
Total	7,801	100.00	23
Valid votes	7,801	96.76	
Invalid/blank votes	261	3.24	
Total votes	8,062	100.00	
Registered voters/turnout	13,394	60.19	

Sixteen of the twenty candidates elected on the Beočin Tomorrow list were endorsed by the Serbian Progressive Party, and four were endorsed by the Socialist Party of Serbia.

Both candidates elected on the Beočin Against Violence!–I Choose the Fight list were endorsed by the People's Movement of Serbia.

Incumbent mayor Biljana Janković of the Progressives was confirmed for a new term in office on 11 July 2024.

===== Srbobran =====
Results of the election for the municipal assembly of Srbobran:

Party	Votes	%	Seats
Aleksandar Vučić—Srbobran Tomorrow (Ivica Dačić-Socialist Party of Serbia-SPS; Rasim Ljajić-Social Democratic Party of Serbia-SDP Serbia; Dr. Vojislav Šešelj-Serbian Radical Party-SRS; Aleksandar Vulin-Movement of Socialists-PS; Miloš Vučević-Serbian Progressive Party-SNS)	5,167	67.08	20
Citizens' Group: Let's Free Srbobran	1,212	15.73	4
NADA for Srbobran, Turija, and Nadalj–New Democratic Party of Serbia–Movement for the Restoration of the Kingdom of Serbia–Dragoljub Banković	666	8.65	2
Alliance of Vojvodina Hungarians–Dr. Bálint Pásztor	658	8.54	2
Total	7,703	100.00	28
Valid votes	7,703	96.10	
Invalid/blank votes	313	3.90	
Total votes	8,016	100.00	
Registered voters/turnout	13,728	58.39	

Seventeen of the twenty delegates elected on the Srbobran Tomorrow list were endorsed by the Serbian Progressive Party, two by the Socialist Party of Serbia, and one by the Serbian Radical Party.

One candidate each elected on the NADA for Srbobran, Turija, and Nadalj list was endorsed by the New Democratic Party of Serbia and the Movement for the Restoration of the Kingdom of Serbia.

Incumbent mayor Radivoje Debeljački of the Progressives was confirmed for a new term in office on 10 July 2024.

===== Sremski Karlovci =====
Results of the election for the municipal assembly of Sremski Karlovci:

Party	Votes	%	Seats
Aleksandar Vučić—Sremski Karlovci Tomorrow (Ivica Dačić-Socialist Party of Serbia-SPS; Rasim Ljajić-Social Democratic Party of Serbia-SDP Serbia; Milan Krkobabić-Party of United Pensioners, Farmers, and Proletarians of Serbia – Solidarity and Justice-PUPS – Solidarity and Justice; Miloš Vučević-Serbian Progressive Party-SNS)	2,016	52.17	14
Citizens' Group: Karlovac List–Dr. Ivan Stijepović	1,085	28.08	7
Dr. Vojislav Šešelj-Serbian Radical Party	511	13.22	3
New Democratic Party of Serbia (Novi DSS)–Sremski Karlovci–Snežana Marjanović	252	6.52	1
Total	3,864	100.00	25
Valid votes	3,864	96.72	
Invalid/blank votes	131	3.28	
Total votes	3,995	100.00	
Registered voters/turnout	8,040	49.69	

Eleven of the fourteen candidates elected on the Sremski Karlovci Tomorrow list were endorsed by the Serbian Progressive Party, two by the Socialist Party of Serbia, and one by the PUPS.

Dražen Đurđić of the Serbian Progressive Party, the main party of the Sremski Karlovci Tomorrow alliance, was chosen as mayor on 12 July 2024.

===== Temerin =====
Results of the election for the municipal assembly of Temerin:

Party	Votes	%	Seats
Aleksandar Vučić—Temerin Tomorrow (Ivica Dačić-Socialist Party of Serbia-SPS; Dr. Vojislav Šešelj-Serbian Radical Party-SRS; Aleksandar Vulin-Movement of Socialists-PS; Miloš Vučević-Serbian Progressive Party-SNS)	7,208	61.68	21
United Opposition for Temerin–Dr. Tanja Radovanović (Democratic Party, New Face of Serbia, New Democratic Party of Serbia, Movement for the Restoration of the Kingdom of Serbia)	2,055	17.58	6
Alliance of Vojvodina Hungarians–Dr. Bálint Pásztor (Alliance of Vojvodina Hungarians, Democratic Party of Vojvodina Hungarians, Hungarian Unity Party)	2,002	17.13	5
For Our Temerin–Robert Karan–Coalition STRENGTH (Party of Montenegrins, Bosniak Civic Party)	422	3.61	1
Total	11,687	100.00	33
Valid votes	11,687	96.95	
Invalid/blank votes	368	3.05	
Total votes	12,055	100.00	
Registered voters/turnout	24,763	48.68	

Seventeen of the twenty-one candidates elected on the Temerin Tomorrow list were endorsed by the Serbian Progressive Party, two by the Socialist Party of Serbia, and one each by the Movement of Socialists and the Serbian Radical Party.

Three of the six candidates elected on the United Opposition of Temerin list were endorsed by the Democratic Party, two by the New Face of Serbia, and one by the New Democratic Party of Serbia.

Four of the five candidates elected on the Alliance of Vojvodina Hungarians list were endorsed by the Alliance of Vojvodina Hungarians. The other was endorsed by the Democratic Party of Vojvodina Hungarians.

The candidate elected on the For Our Temerin list was endorsed by the Party of Montenegrins.

Incumbent mayor Mladen Zec of the Progressives was confirmed for another term in office on 12 July 2024.

===== Titel =====
Results of the election for the municipal assembly of Titel:

Party	Votes	%	Seats
Aleksandar Vučić—Titel Tomorrow (Ivica Dačić-Socialist Party of Serbia-SPS; Milan Krkobabić-Party of United Pensioners, Farmers, and Proletarians of Serbia – Solidarity and Justice-PUPS – Solidarity and Justice; Dr. Vojislav Šešelj-Serbian Radical Party-SRS; Aleksandar Vulin-Movement of Socialists-PS; Miloš Vučević-Serbian Progressive Party-SNS)	5,294	74.99	19
Citizens' Group: For Our Villages	834	11.81	3
United We Can Do Better (Party of Freedom and Justice, Serbia Centre, Democratic Party)	683	9.67	2
Citizens' Group: All for Šajkaška	249	3.53	1
Total	7,060	100.00	25
Valid votes	7,060	96.87	
Invalid/blank votes	228	3.13	
Total votes	7,288	100.00	
Registered voters/turnout	12,637	57.67	

Sixteen of the nineteen candidates elected on the Titel Tomorrow list were endorsed by the Serbian Progressive Party, and one each was endorsed by the Movement of Socialists, the Serbian Radical Party, and the Socialist Party of Serbia.

One candidate each elected on the United We Can Do Better list was endorsed by Serbia Centre and the Party of Freedom and Justice.

Incumbent mayor Dragan Božić of the Progressives was confirmed for another term in office on 9 July 2024.

===== Vrbas =====
Results of the election for the municipal assembly of Vrbas:

Party	Votes	%	Seats
Aleksandar Vučić—Vrbas Tomorrow (Ivica Dačić-Socialist Party of Serbia-SPS; Rasim Ljajić-Social Democratic Party of Serbia-SDP Serbia; Milan Krkobabić-Party of United Pensioners, Farmers, and Proletarians of Serbia – Solidarity and Justice-PUPS – Solidarity and Justice; Dr. Vojislav Šešelj-Serbian Radical Party-SRS; Aleksandar Vulin-Movement of Socialists-PS; Dr. Bálint Pásztor–Alliance of Vojvodina Hungarians–SMV-VMSZ; Milica Đurđević Stamenkovski-Serbian Party Oathkeepers-OATHKEEPERS; Miloš Vučević-Serbian Progressive Party-SNS)	11,443	64.17	23
Citizens' Group: Let's Free Vrbas Today	4,949	27.75	10
Citizens' Group: Vrbas Against Violence	1,050	5.89	2
Russian Party–Serbs and Russians Are Brothers Forever!	390	2.19	1
Total	17,832	100.00	36
Valid votes	17,832	96.54	
Invalid/blank votes	639	3.46	
Total votes	18,471	100.00	
Registered voters/turnout	33,723	54.77	

Fifteen of the twenty-three candidates elected on the Vrbas Tomorrow list were endorsed by the Serbian Progressive Party, four by the Socialist Party of Serbia, and one each by the Alliance of Vojvodina Hungarians, the Movement of Socialists, the PUPS, and the Serbian Radical Party.

Former Dveri parliamentarian Ivan Kostić was elected from the fourth position on the Let's Free Vrbas Today list. He became the leader of Dveri on 29 September 2024.

Milan Glušac of the Progressives was chosen as mayor on 11 July 2024. He had previously been mayor in 2016–17 and 2017–20.

===== Žabalj =====
Results of the election for the municipal assembly of Žabalj:

Party	Votes	%	Seats
Aleksandar Vučić—Žabalj Tomorrow (Ivica Dačić-Socialist Party of Serbia-SPS; Dr. Vojislav Šešelj-Serbian Radical Party-SRS; Aleksandar Vulin-Movement of Socialists-PS; Miloš Vučević-Serbian Progressive Party-SNS)	9,669	84.43	18
United Opposition of Žabalj "I Choose the Fight" (Democratic Party, People's Movement of Serbia, League of Social Democrats of Vojvodina–VOJVODINIANS, and Movement for the Restoration of the Kingdom of Serbia)	1,322	11.54	2
Citizens' Group: Žabalj Against Violence	461	4.03	1
Total	11,452	100.00	21
Valid votes	11,452	93.14	
Invalid/blank votes	844	6.86	
Total votes	12,296	100.00	
Registered voters/turnout	21,258	57.84	

Fifteen of the eighteen candidates elected on the Žabalj Tomorrow list were endorsed by the Serbian Progressive Party, and one each was endorsed by the Movement of Socialists, the Serbian Radical Party, and the Socialist Party of Serbia.

One candidate each elected on the United Opposition of Žabalj list was endorsed by the Democratic Party and the Movement for the Restoration of the Kingdom of Serbia.

Incumbent mayor Uroš Radanović of the Progressives was confirmed for another term in office on 11 July 2024.

==== South Banat District ====
Local elections were held in both cities (i.e., Pančevo and Vršac) and all six municipalities of the South Banat District. The Progressive Party and its allies won majority victories in all jurisdictions.

===== Pančevo =====
Results of the election for the city assembly of Pančevo:

Party	Votes	%	Seats
Aleksandar Vučić—Pančevo Tomorrow (Ivica Dačić-Socialist Party of Serbia-SPS; Rasim Ljajić-Social Democratic Party of Serbia-SDP Serbia; Milan Krkobabić-Party of United Pensioners, Farmers, and Proletarians of Serbia – Solidarity and Justice-PUPS – Solidarity and Justice; Dr. Vojislav Šešelj-Serbian Radical Party-SRS; Milica Đurđević Stamenkovski-Serbian Party Oathkeepers-OATHKEEPERS; Ivan Karić-Greens of Serbia-ZS; Miloš Vučević-Serbian Progressive Party-SNS)	33,188	67.01	49
Pančevo Against Violence–I Choose the Fight (People's Movement of Serbia, Democratic Party, Green–Left Front, League of Social Democrats of Vojvodina–VOJVODINIANS, Movement of Free Citizens)	7,921	15.99	11
Citizens' Group: Pančevo Group–Your Neighbours	6,420	12.96	9
Pančevo–Fight Against Violence (Movement for the Restoration of the Kingdom of Serbia, People's Party)	1,183	2.39	–
Alliance of Vojvodina Hungarians–Dr. Bálint Pásztor	815	1.65	1
Total	49,527	100.00	70
Valid votes	49,527	96.88	
Invalid/blank votes	1,593	3.12	
Total votes	51,120	100.00	
Registered voters/turnout	106,192	48.14	

Forty-one of the forty-nine candidates elected on the Pančevo Tomorrow list were endorsed by the Serbian Progressive Party, five by the Socialist Party of Serbia, and one each by the PUPS, the Serbian Radical Party, and the Social Democratic Party of Serbia.

Three candidates each elected on the Pančevo Against Violence list were endorsed by the Democratic Party and the People's Movement of Serbia, two candidates each by the Green–Left Front and the League of Social Democrats of Vojvodina, and one candidate by the Movement of Free Citizens.

Incumbent mayor Aleksandar Stevanović of the Progressives was confirmed for a new term in office on 8 July 2024.

===== Alibunar =====
Results of the election for the municipal assembly of Alibunar:

Party	Votes	%	Seats
Aleksandar Vučić—Alibunar Tomorrow (Ivica Dačić-Socialist Party of Serbia-SPS; Rasim Ljajić-Social Democratic Party of Serbia-SDP Serbia; Milan Krkobabić-Party of United Pensioners, Farmers, and Proletarians of Serbia – Solidarity and Justice-PUPS – Solidarity and Justice; Dr. Vojislav Šešelj-Serbian Radical Party-SRS; Miloš Vučević-Serbian Progressive Party-SNS)	5,588	70.17	17
Dr. Dragana Lindo and Dr. Nikolaje Marina–For a Free Alibunar Party of Freedom and Justice	1,431	17.97	4
Alibunar Against Violence–Adrijan Živku, Slobodan Bokun (People's Movement of Serbia, Democratic Party)	565	7.09	1
Citizens' Group: Freedom–Belić Predrag	380	4.77	1
Total	7,964	100.00	23
Valid votes	7,964	95.96	
Invalid/blank votes	335	4.04	
Total votes	8,299	100.00	
Registered voters/turnout	16,815	49.35	

Fourteen of the seventeen candidates elected on the Alibunar Tomorrow list were endorsed by the Serbian Progressive Party, two by the Socialist Party of Serbia, and one by the Serbian Radical Party.

The candidate elected on the Alibunar Against Violence list was endorsed by the People's Movement of Serbia.

Incumbent mayor Zorana Bratić of the Progressives was confirmed for a new term in office on 10 July 2024.

===== Bela Crkva =====
Results of the election for the municipal assembly of Bela Crkva:

Party	Votes	%	Seats
Aleksandar Vučić—Bela Crkva Tomorrow (Ivica Dačić-Socialist Party of Serbia-SPS; Rasim Ljajić-Social Democratic Party of Serbia-SDP Serbia; Milan Krkobabić-Party of United Pensioners, Farmers, and Proletarians of Serbia – Solidarity and Justice-PUPS – Solidarity and Justice; Dr. Vojislav Šešelj-Serbian Radical Party-SRS; Miloš Vučević-Serbian Progressive Party-SNS)	5,189	67.92	23
Citizens' Group: "Movement for Bela Crkva–Sandra Ristić	1,243	16.27	5
Citizens' Group: For Our Bela Crkva	876	11.47	4
We – Voice from the People of Bela Crkva	332	4.35	1
Total	7,640	100.00	33
Valid votes	7,640	96.09	
Invalid/blank votes	311	3.91	
Total votes	7,951	100.00	
Registered voters/turnout	15,573	51.06	

Twenty of the twenty-three candidates elected on the Bela Crkva Tomorrow list were endorsed by the Serbian Progressive Party, two by the Socialist Party of Serbia, and one by the Social Democratic Party of Serbia.

Tatjana Kokar of the Progressives was chosen as mayor on 11 July 2024.

===== Kovačica =====
Results of the election for the municipal assembly of Kovačica:

Party	Votes	%	Seats
Aleksandar Vučić—Kovačica Tomorrow (Ivica Dačić-Socialist Party of Serbia-SPS; Dr. Vojislav Šešelj-Serbian Radical Party-SRS; Miloš Vučević-Serbian Progressive Party-SNS)	6,480	67.70	20
United Opposition of the Municipality of Kovačica–I Choose the Fight (Democratic Party, League of Social Democrats of Vojvodina–VOJVODINIANS, People's Movement of Serbia)	2,699	28.20	8
Alliance of Vojvodina Hungarians–Dr. Bálint Pásztor	392	4.10	1
Total	9,571	100.00	29
Valid votes	9,571	96.82	
Invalid/blank votes	314	3.18	
Total votes	9,885	100.00	
Registered voters/turnout	20,998	47.08	

Eighteen of the twenty candidates elected on the Kovačica Tomorrow list were endorsed by the Serbian Progressive Party, and two were endorsed by the Socialist Party of Serbia.

Four of the eight candidates elected on the United Opposition list were endorsed by the League of Social Democrats of Vojvodina, three by the Democratic Party, and one by the People's Movement of Serbia.

Petar Višnjički of the Progressives was chosen as mayor on 10 July 2024.

===== Kovin =====
Results of the election for the municipal assembly of Kovin:

Party	Votes	%	Seats
Aleksandar Vučić—Kovin Tomorrow (Ivica Dačić-Socialist Party of Serbia-SPS; Rasim Ljajić-Social Democratic Party of Serbia-SDP Serbia; Milan Krkobabić-Party of United Pensioners, Farmers, and Proletarians of Serbia – Solidarity and Justice-PUPS – Solidarity and Justice; Dr. Vojislav Šešelj-Serbian Radical Party-SRS; Miloš Vučević-Serbian Progressive Party-SNS)	9,544	75.00	27
Get Started for Kovin–Srđan Vukša (Democratic Party, People's Movement of Serbia)	2,401	18.87	6
Alliance of Vojvodina Hungarians–Dr. Bálint Pásztor	781	6.14	2
Total	12,726	100.00	35
Valid votes	12,726	94.98	
Invalid/blank votes	673	5.02	
Total votes	13,399	100.00	
Registered voters/turnout	27,605	48.54	

Twenty-four of the twenty-seven candidates elected on the Kovin Tomorrow list were endorsed by the Serbian Progressive Party, two by the Socialist Party of Serbia, and one by the Serbian Radical Party.

Five of the six candidates elected on the Get Started for Kovin list were endorsed by the Democratic Party, and one was endorsed by the People's Movement of Serbia.

Violeta Ocokoljić of the Progressives was chosen as mayor on 15 July 2024.

===== Opovo =====
Results of the election for the municipal assembly of Opovo:

Party	Votes	%	Seats
Aleksandar Vučić—Opovo Tomorrow (Ivica Dačić-Socialist Party of Serbia-SPS; Rasim Ljajić-Social Democratic Party of Serbia-SDP Serbia; Milan Krkobabić-Party of United Pensioners, Farmers, and Proletarians of Serbia – Solidarity and Justice-PUPS – Solidarity and Justice; Dragan Marković Palma-United Serbia-JS; Dr. Vojislav Šešelj-Serbian Radical Party-SRS; Miloš Vučević-Serbian Progressive Party-SNS)	3,578	91.49	23
Russian Party–Serbs and Russians Are Brothers Forever!	333	8.51	2
Total	3,911	100.00	25
Valid votes	3,911	94.04	
Invalid/blank votes	248	5.96	
Total votes	4,159	100.00	
Registered voters/turnout	8,044	51.70	

Nineteen of the twenty-three candidates elected on the Opovo Tomorrow list were endorsed by the Serbian Progressive Party, three by the Socialist Party of Serbia, and one by the Serbian Radical Party.

Anka Simin Damjanov of the Progressives was chosen as mayor on 10 July 2024.

===== Plandište =====
Results of the election for the municipal assembly of Plandište:

Party	Votes	%	Seats
Aleksandar Vučić—Plandište Tomorrow (Ivica Dačić-Socialist Party of Serbia-SPS; Milan Krkobabić-Party of United Pensioners, Farmers, and Proletarians of Serbia – Solidarity and Justice-PUPS – Solidarity and Justice; Dr. Vojislav Šešelj-Serbian Radical Party-SRS; Miloš Vučević-Serbian Progressive Party-SNS)	2,785	66.01	13
Citizens' Group: Lawyer Lukić Danilo–To Victory for a Better Municipality of Plandište	901	21.36	4
Alliance of Vojvodina Hungarians–Dr. Bálint Pásztor	533	12.63	2
Total	4,219	100.00	19
Valid votes	4,219	92.50	
Invalid/blank votes	342	7.50	
Total votes	4,561	100.00	
Registered voters/turnout	8,541	53.40	

Ten of the thirteen candidates elected on the Plandište Tomorrow list were endorsed by the Serbian Progressive Party, two by the Socialist Party of Serbia, and one by the PUPS.

Incumbent mayor Jovan Repac of the Progressives was confirmed for a new term in office on 11 July 2024.

===== Vršac =====
Results of the election for the city assembly of Vršac:

Party	Votes	%	Seats
Aleksandar Vučić—Vršac Tomorrow (Ivica Dačić-Socialist Party of Serbia-SPS; Rasim Ljajić-Social Democratic Party of Serbia-SDP Serbia; Milan Krkobabić-Party of United Pensioners, Farmers, and Proletarians of Serbia – Solidarity and Justice-PUPS – Solidarity and Justice; Dr. Vojislav Šešelj-Serbian Radical Party-SRS; Dr. Bálint Pásztor-Alliance of Vojvodina Hungarians-SMV-VMSZ; Miloš Vučević-Serbian Progressive Party-SNS)	13,712	69.09	32
Vršac Deserves Better–Democratic Party, People's Movement of Serbia, New Democratic Party of Serbia, League of Social Democrats of Vojvodina–VOJVODINIANS, Movement for the Restoration of the Kingdom of Serbia	5,456	27.49	12
Citizens' Group: I Choose Vršac	678	3.42	1
Total	19,846	100.00	45
Valid votes	19,846	96.76	
Invalid/blank votes	664	3.24	
Total votes	20,510	100.00	
Registered voters/turnout	44,173	46.43	

Twenty-six of the thirty-two candidates elected on the Vršac Tomorrow list were endorsed by the Serbian Progressive Party, two by the Socialist Party of Serbia, and one each by the Association of Vojvodina Hungarians, the PUPS, the Serbian Radical Party, and the Social Democratic Party of Serbia.

Four candidates each elected on the Vršac Deserves Better list were endorsed by the Democratic Party and the People's Movement of Serbia, two by League of Social Democrats of Vojvodina, and one each by the Movement for the Restoration of the Kingdom of Serbia and the New Democratic Party of Serbia.

Incumbent mayor Dragana Mitrović of the Progressives was confirmed for another term in office on 9 July 2024.

==== Srem District ====
Local elections were held in the one city (i.e., Sremska Mitrovica) and the six other municipalities of the Srem District. The Serbian Progressive Party and its allies won majority victories in all jurisdictions.

===== Sremska Mitrovica =====
Results of the election for the city assembly of Sremska Mitrovica:

Party	Votes	%	Seats
Aleksandar Vučić—Sremska Mitrovica Tomorrow (Ivica Dačić-Socialist Party of Serbia-SPS; Milan Krkobabić-Party of United Pensioners, Farmers, and Proletarians of Serbia – Solidarity and Justice-PUPS – Solidarity and Justice; Dr. Vojislav Šešelj-Serbian Radical Party-SRS; Milica Đurđević Stamenkovski-Serbian Party Oathkeepers-OATHKEEPERS; Dr. Bálint Pásztor-Alliance of Vojvodina Hungarians-SMV-VMSZ; Miloš Vučević-Serbian Progressive Party-SNS)	20,782	61.76	39
Citizens' Group: A City for All of Us	7,278	21.63	14
Coalition: Sremska Mitrovica Against Violence–Đorđo Đorđić–Tatjana Ljubišić–Danijel Ćetojević (Party of Freedom and Justice, People's Movement of Serbia, Democratic Party, United Trade Unions of Serbia "Sloga")	2,631	7.82	5
Citizens' Group: Dr. Savo Manojlović–I'm Mitrovica Too–Kreni-Promeni–Young Mitrovica	2,045	6.08	3
NADA for Mitrovica–New Democratic Party of Serbia (Novi DSS)–Serbian Movement Dveri (Dveri)–Movement for the Restoration of the Kingdom of Serbia (POKS)–Milivoje Todorović	703	2.09	–
Citizens' Group: European Mitrovica	210	0.62	–
Total	33,649	100.00	61
Valid votes	33,649	97.46	
Invalid/blank votes	876	2.54	
Total votes	34,525	100.00	
Registered voters/turnout	68,599	50.33	

Thirty-three of the thirty-nine candidates elected on the Sremska Mitrovica Tomorrow list were endorsed by the Serbian Progressive Party, three by the Socialist Party of Serbia, and one each by the Alliance of Vojvodina Hungarians, the PUPS, and the Serbian Radical Party.

Two candidates elected on the Sremska Mitrovica Against Violence list were endorsed by the Party of Freedom and Justice and the People's Movement of Serbia. One candidate was endorsed by the Democratic Party.

Branislav Nedimović of the Progressives was chosen as mayor on 2 August 2024.

===== Inđija =====
Results of the election for the municipal assembly of Inđija:

Party	Votes	%	Seats
Aleksandar Vučić—Inđija Tomorrow (Ivica Dačić-Socialist Party of Serbia-SPS; Rasim Ljajić-Social Democratic Party of Serbia-SDP Serbia; Dr. Vojislav Šešelj-Serbian Radical Party-SRS; Milica Đurđević Stamenkovski-Serbian Party Oathkeepers-OATHKEEPERS; Marijan Rističević-People's Peasant Party-NSS; Miloš Vučević-Serbian Progressive Party-SNS)	12,412	57.80	22
Citizens' Group: Citizen – Strahinja Jovanović-Yes, It Can Be Better	5,549	25.84	10
Citizens' Group: "Inđija"–All Together	1,746	8.13	3
I Choose the Fight for Inđija–Radovan Grković (People's Movement of Serbia, Movement of Free Citizens, Democratic Party, New Face of Serbia, Movement for the Restoration of the Kingdom of Serbia)	981	4.57	1
We – Power of the People, Prof. Dr. Branimir Nestorović-Inđija	785	3.66	1
Total	21,473	100.00	37
Valid votes	21,473	97.68	
Invalid/blank votes	511	2.32	
Total votes	21,984	100.00	
Registered voters/turnout	40,432	54.37	

Seventeen of the twenty-two candidates elected on the Inđija Tomorrow list were endorsed by the Serbian Progressive Party, two by the Socialist Party of Serbia, and one each by the People's Peasant Party, the Serbian Party Oathkeepers, and the Serbian Radical Party.

Radovan Grković, the candidate elected on the I Choose the Fight for Inđija list, was endorsed by the People's Movement of Serbia.

Marko Gašić of the Progressives was chosen as mayor on 12 July 2024.

===== Irig =====
Results of the election for the municipal assembly of Irig:

Party	Votes	%	Seats
Aleksandar Vučić—Irig Tomorrow (Ivica Dačić-Socialist Party of Serbia-SPS; Dr. Vojislav Šešelj-Serbian Radical Party-SRS; Miloš Vučević-Serbian Progressive Party-SNS)	3,620	81.79	16
For Our Most Beautiful Municipality! – For Mala Remeta! For Jazak! For Vrdnik! For Rivica! For Irig! For Neradin! For Grgeteg! For Šatrinci! For Dobrodol! For Krušedol Selo! For Krušedol Prnjavor! For Velika Remeta! (People's Movement of Serbia)	583	13.17	2
Citizens' Group: For a Green Irig–When If Not Now	223	5.04	1
Total	4,426	100.00	19
Valid votes	4,426	95.99	
Invalid/blank votes	185	4.01	
Total votes	4,611	100.00	
Registered voters/turnout	8,974	51.38	

Thirteen of the sixteen candidates elected on the Irig Tomorrow list were endorsed by the Serbian Progressive Party, two by the Socialist Party of Serbia, and one by the Serbian Radical Party.

Incumbent mayor Tihomir Stojaković of the Progressives was confirmed for another term in office on 9 July 2024.

===== Pećinci =====
Results of the election for the municipal assembly of Pećinci:

Party	Votes	%	Seats
Aleksandar Vučić—Pećinci Tomorrow (Ivica Dačić-Socialist Party of Serbia-SPS; Milan Krkobabić-Party of United Pensioners, Farmers, and Proletarians of Serbia – Solidarity and Justice-PUPS – Solidarity and Justice; Dr. Vojislav Šešelj-Serbian Radical Party-SRS; Milica Đurđević Stamenkovski-Serbian Party Oathkeepers-OATHKEEPERS; Miloš Vučević-Serbian Progressive Party-SNS)	10,034	85.55	27
Pećinci Against Violence (Democratic Party, Party of Freedom and Justice, New Face of Serbia)	932	7.95	2
For Our Village–People's Movement of Serbia–Miroslav Aleksić	430	3.67	1
Citizens' Group: For a Greener Pećinci	213	1.82	–
Citizens' Group: For a Stronger Pećinci	120	1.02	–
Total	11,729	100.00	30
Valid votes	11,729	96.27	
Invalid/blank votes	454	3.73	
Total votes	12,183	100.00	
Registered voters/turnout	15,572	78.24	

Twenty-five of the twenty-seven candidates elected on the Pećinci Tomorrow list were endorsed by the Serbian Progressive Party, and one each was endorsed by the Serbian Party Oathkeepers and the Serbian Radical Party.

One candidate each elected on the Pećinci Against Violence list was endorsed by the Democratic Party and the Party of Freedom and Justice.

Incumbent mayor Siniša Đokić of the Progressives was confirmed for a new term in office on 11 July 2024.

===== Ruma =====
Results of the election for the municipal assembly of Ruma:

Party	Votes	%	Seats
Aleksandar Vučić—Ruma Tomorrow (Ivica Dačić-Socialist Party of Serbia-SPS; Rasim Ljajić-Social Democratic Party of Serbia-SDP Serbia; Milan Krkobabić-Party of United Pensioners, Farmers, and Proletarians of Serbia – Solidarity and Justice-PUPS – Solidarity and Justice; Dr. Vojislav Šešelj-Serbian Radical Party-SRS; Aleksandar Vulin-Movement of Socialists-PS; Milica Đurđević Stamenkovski-Serbian Party Oathkeepers-OATHKEEPERS; Miloš Vučević-Serbian Progressive Party-SNS)	16,619	72.41	33
Ruma Against Violence (Party of Freedom and Justice, Democratic Party, Serbia Centre, People's Movement of Serbia)	3,114	13.57	6
New Democratic Party of Serbia–Let's Live Normally	1,229	5.35	2
Russian Party–Serbs and Russians Are Brothers Forever!	856	3.73	1
We Choose a Healthy and Green Ruma–Green–Left Front and League of Social Democrats of Vojvodina-VOJVODINIANS–Dušanka Stefanović Radisavljević	809	3.52	1
European GREEN Party–For a Green Ruma	324	1.41	–
Total	22,951	100.00	43
Valid votes	22,951	97.39	
Invalid/blank votes	615	2.61	
Total votes	23,566	100.00	
Registered voters/turnout	45,556	51.73	

Twenty-eight of the thirty-three candidates elected on the Ruma Tomorrow list were endorsed by the Serbian Progressive Party, three by the Socialist Party of Serbia, and one each by the PUPS and the Serbian Radical Party.

Three of the six candidates elected on the Ruma Against Violence list were endorsed by the Party of Freedom and Justice, and one each was endorsed by the Democratic Party, the People's Movement of Serbia, and Serbia Centre.

The candidate elected on the We Choose a Healthy and Green Ruma list was Dušanka Stefanović Radisavljević of the Green–Left Front.

Dušan Ljubišić of the Progressives was chosen as mayor on 12 July 2024.

===== Šid =====
Results of the election for the municipal assembly of Šid:

Party	Votes	%	Seats
Aleksandar Vučić—Šid Tomorrow (Ivica Dačić-Socialist Party of Serbia-SPS; Rasim Ljajić-Social Democratic Party of Serbia-SDP Serbia; Milan Krkobabić-Party of United Pensioners, Farmers, and Proletarians of Serbia – Solidarity and Justice-PUPS – Solidarity and Justice; Dr. Vojislav Šešelj-Serbian Radical Party-SRS; Aleksandar Vulin-Movement of Socialists-PS; Miloš Vučević-Serbian Progressive Party-SNS)	11,015	75.20	30
United Opposition–Vote for Change (Democratic Party, New Democratic Party of Serbia, Party of Freedom and Justice, Serbian Movement Dveri)	3,632	24.80	9
Total	14,647	100.00	39
Valid votes	14,647	96.27	
Invalid/blank votes	568	3.73	
Total votes	15,215	100.00	
Registered voters/turnout	29,360	51.82	

Twenty-five of the thirty candidates elected on the Šid Tomorrow list were endorsed by the Serbian Progressive Party, two by the Socialist Party of Serbia, and one each by the Movement of Socialists, the Serbian Radical Party, and the Social Democratic Party of Serbia.

Three candidates each of the nine elected on the United Opposition list were respectively endorsed by the Democratic Party and the New Democratic Party of Serbia. Two candidates were endorsed by the Party of Freedom of Justice, and one candidate was endorsed by Dveri.

Incumbent mayor Zoran Semenović of the Progressives was confirmed for another term in office on 5 July 2024.

===== Stara Pazova =====
Results of the election for the municipal assembly of Stara Pazova:

Party	Votes	%	Seats
Aleksandar Vučić—Pazova Tomorrow (Ivica Dačić-Socialist Party of Serbia-SPS; Rasim Ljajić-Social Democratic Party of Serbia-SDP Serbia; Milan Krkobabić-Party of United Pensioners, Farmers, and Proletarians of Serbia – Solidarity and Justice-PUPS – Solidarity and Justice; Dr. Vojislav Šešelj-Serbian Radical Party-SRS; Aleksandar Vulin-Movement of Socialists-PS; Milica Đurđević Stamenkovski-Serbian Party Oathkeepers-OATHKEEPERS; Ivan Karić-Greens of Serbia-ZS; Miloš Vučević-Serbian Progressive Party-SNS)	16,805	65.78	38
It Is Possible ... (Serbia Centre-SRCE, Green–Left Front, New DSS, People's Movement of Serbia, Choice for Our Municipality–Milan Turanjanin, New Face of Serbia, Ecological Uprising-Ćuta)	3,029	11.86	6
"We – Power of the People, Prof. Dr. Branimir Nestorović"–Municipality of Stara Pazova	2,266	8.87	5
Citizens' Group: Danube Movement and Movement for a Healthy Pazova	1,815	7.10	4
Citizens' Group: For a Green Pazova–If Not Now, When?–Dr. Dejan Žujović	537	2.10	–
Movement for the Restoration of the Kingdom of Serbia	534	2.09	–
Citizens' Group: I Choose the Fight Against Violence	300	1.17	–
For the People to Ask (People's Party)	262	1.03	–
Total	25,548	100.00	53
Valid votes	25,548	97.59	
Invalid/blank votes	631	2.41	
Total votes	26,179	100.00	
Registered voters/turnout	56,114	46.65	

Thirty-three of the thirty-eight candidates elected on the Pazova Tomorrow list were endorsed by the Serbian Progressive Party, two by the Socialist Party of Serbia, and one each by the Movement of Socialists, the PUPS, and the Serbian Radical Party.

Two candidates each elected on the It Is Possible list were endorsed by the Green–Left Front, the New Democratic Party of Serbia, and Serbia Centre.

Incumbent mayor Đorđe Radinović of the Progressives was confirmed for another term in office on 9 July 2024.

==== West Bačka District ====
Local elections were held in the one city (i.e., Sombor) and two of the other three municipalities of the West Bačka District. The exception was Kula, where the previous local election had been held in 2022.

The Progressive Party and its allies won majority victories in all jurisdictions that held elections.

===== Sombor =====
Results of the election for the city assembly of Sombor:

Party	Votes	%	Seats
Aleksandar Vučić—Sombor Tomorrow (Ivica Dačić-Socialist Party of Serbia-SPS; Rasim Ljajić-Social Democratic Party of Serbia-SDP Serbia; Milan Krkobabić-Party of United Pensioners, Farmers, and Proletarians of Serbia – Solidarity and Justice-PUPS – Solidarity and Justice; Dr. Vojislav Šešelj-Serbian Radical Party-SRS; Aleksandar Vulin-Movement of Socialists-PS; Miloš Vučević-Serbian Progressive Party-SNS)	20,706	68.57	42
I Choose Sombor Without Violence (Democratic Party, Green–Left Front, Democratic Fellowship of Vojvodina Hungarians, Movement of Free Citizens, New Face of Serbia, People's Movement of Serbia)	5,825	19.29	11
Alliance of Vojvodina Hungarians–Dr. Bálint Pásztor	1,954	6.47	4
Citizens' Group: Civic Front–Stop the Madness	976	3.23	2
For Righteous Sombor!–Democratic Alliance of Croats in Vojvodina–Tomislav Žigmanov	735	2.43	2
Total	30,196	100.00	61
Valid votes	30,196	97.20	
Invalid/blank votes	870	2.80	
Total votes	31,066	100.00	
Registered voters/turnout	70,910	43.81	

Thirty-six of the forty-two candidates elected on the Sombor Tomorrow list were endorsed by the Serbian Progressive Party, three by the Socialist Party of Serbia, and one each by the Movement of Socialists, the Serbian Radical Party, and the Social Democratic Party of Serbia.

Three candidates each elected on the I Choose Sombor Without Violence list were endorsed by the Democratic Party and the Green–Left Front, two by the People's Movement of Serbia, and one each by the Democratic Fellowship of Vojvodina Hungarians, the Movement of Free Citizens, and the New Face of Serbia.

Parliamentarian Emese Úri appeared in the eighth position on the list of the Alliance of Vojvodina Hungarians and was not elected.

Incumbent mayor Antonio Ratković of the Progressives was confirmed for a new term in office on 12 July 2024.

===== Apatin =====
Results of the election for the municipal assembly of Apatin:

Party	Votes	%	Seats
Aleksandar Vučić—Apatin Tomorrow (Ivica Dačić-Socialist Party of Serbia-SPS; Rasim Ljajić-Social Democratic Party of Serbia-SDP Serbia; Aleksandar Vulin-Movement of Socialists-PS; Miloš Vučević-Serbian Progressive Party-SNS)	7,617	70.93	21
Citizens' Group: Perica Popić–"Apatin Will Awaken"	1,785	16.62	5
Alliance of Vojvodina Hungarians–Dr. Bálint Pásztor	920	8.57	2
Citizens' Group: Apatin Without Violence–Miloš Rakas	417	3.88	1
Total	10,739	100.00	29
Valid votes	10,739	96.87	
Invalid/blank votes	347	3.13	
Total votes	11,086	100.00	
Registered voters/turnout	23,916	46.35	

Seventeen of the twenty-one candidates elected on the Apatin Tomorrow list were endorsed by the Serbian Progressive Party, two by the Socialist Party of Serbia, and one each by the Serbian Radical Party and the Social Democratic Party of Serbia.

Incumbent mayor Dubravka Korać of the Progressives was confirmed for a new term in office on 11 July 2024.

===== Kula =====
There was no election for the municipal assembly of Kula in 2024. The previous election took place in 2022.

===== Odžaci =====
Results of the election for the municipal assembly of Odžaci:

Party	Votes	%	Seats
Aleksandar Vučić—Odžaci Tomorrow (Ivica Dačić-Socialist Party of Serbia-SPS; Dr. Vojislav Šešelj-Serbian Radical Party-SRS; Dr. Bálint Pásztor-Alliance of Vojvodina Hungarians-SMV-VMSZ; Miloš Vučević-Serbian Progressive Party-SNS)	9,252	86.01	24
Citizens' Group: Odžaci Against Violence–Dr. Vet. Med. Milovan Stanković	1,505	13.99	3
Total	10,757	100.00	27
Valid votes	10,757	94.02	
Invalid/blank votes	684	5.98	
Total votes	11,441	100.00	
Registered voters/turnout	23,846	47.98	

Nineteen of the twenty-four candidates elected on the Odžaci Tomorrow list were endorsed by the Serbian Progressive Party, three by the Socialist Party of Serbia, and one each by the Alliance of Vojvodina Hungarians and the Serbian Radical Party.

Isidora Đaković of the Progressives was chosen as mayor on 4 July 2024.

=== Šumadija and Western Serbia ===
==== Kolubara District ====
The only local election held in the Kolubara District in 2024 was in the city of Valjevo, where the Serbian Progressive Party and its allies won a majority victory. The last election in Mionica was held in 2021, and the last elections in Lajkovac, Ljig, Osečina, and Ub were held in 2023.

===== Valjevo =====
Results of the election for the city assembly of Valjevo:

Party	Votes	%	Seats
Aleksandar Vučić—Valjevo Tomorrow (Ivica Dačić-Socialist Party of Serbia-SPS; Milan Krkobabić-Party of United Pensioners, Farmers, and Proletarians of Serbia – Solidarity and Justice-PUPS – Solidarity and Justice; Milica Đurđević Stamenkovski-Serbian Party Oathkeepers-OATHKEEPERS; Dr. Vojislav Šešelj-Serbian Radical Party-SRS; Milan Stamatović-Healthy Serbia-ZS; Rasim Ljajić-Social Democratic Party of Serbia-SDP Serbia; Marijan Rističević-People's Peasant Party-NSS; Dragan Marković Palma-United Serbia-JS; Aleksandar Vulin-Movement of Socialists-PS; Nenad Popović-Serbian People's Party-SNP; Miloš Vučević-Serbian Progressive Party-SNS)	20,955	56.65	30
Daybreak – United Valjevo Can Do It (Green–Left Front, Party of Freedom and Justice, New Democratic Party of Serbia, New Face of Serbia, People's Movement of Serbia, Democratic Party)	12,436	33.62	17
Citizens' Group: United Patriotic Opposition of Valjevo–For the King and the Fatherland, Prof. Dr. Branimir Nestorović	1,778	4.81	2
Ecology, Green Valjevo–Lifestyle (European Green Party)	737	1.99	1
Russian Party–Russians and Valjevo in the Heart–Milija Nestorović	723	1.95	1
We're Running Out of Time (People's Party–Mirjana Jugović, Serbian Movement Dveri–Stanko Ranković)	359	0.97	–
Total	36,988	100.00	51
Valid votes	36,988	97.61	
Invalid/blank votes	906	2.39	
Total votes	37,894	100.00	
Registered voters/turnout	74,878	50.61	

Nineteen of the thirty candidates elected on the Valjevo Tomorrow list were endorsed by the Serbian Progressive Party, five by the Socialist Party of Serbia, and one each by Healthy Serbia, People's Peasant Party, the PUPS, the Serbian Party Oathkeepers, the Serbian Radical Party, and the Social Democratic Party of Serbia.

Three candidates each elected on the United Valjevo Can Do It list were endorsed by the Democratic Party, the Green–Left Front, the New Democratic Party of Serbia, the New Face of Serbia, and the People's Movement of Serbia. Two candidates were endorsed by the Party of Freedom and Justice.

Incumbent mayor Lazar Gojković of the Progressives was confirmed for a new term in office on 15 July 2024.

===== Lajkovac =====
There was no election for the municipal assembly of Lajkovac in 2024. The previous election took place in 2023.

===== Ljig =====
There was no election for the municipal assembly of Ljig in 2024. The previous election took place in 2023.

===== Mionica =====
There was no election for the municipal assembly of Mionica in 2024. The previous election took place in 2021.

===== Osečina =====
There was no election for the municipal assembly of Osečina in 2024. The previous election took place in 2023.

===== Ub =====
There was no election for the municipal assembly of Ub in 2024. The previous election took place in 2023.

==== Mačva District (Šabac, Bogatić, Koceljeva, Krupanj, Ljubovija, Loznica, Mali Zvornik, Vladimirci) ====
There were no local elections held in the Mačva District in 2024. The last elections in Šabac, Bogatić, Koceljeva, Krupanj, Ljubovija, Loznica, Mali Zvornik, and Vladimirci were held in 2023.

==== Moravica District ====
===== Čačak =====
Results of the election for the city assembly of Čačak:

Party	Votes	%	Seats
Aleksandar Vučić—Čačak Tomorrow (Ivica Dačić-Socialist Party of Serbia-SPS; Rasim Ljajić-Social Democratic Party of Serbia-SDP Serbia; Milan Krkobabić-Party of United Pensioners, Farmers, and Proletarians of Serbia – Solidarity and Justice-PUPS – Solidarity and Justice; Milan Stamatović-Healthy Serbia-ZS; Dragan Marković Palma-United Serbia-JS; Dr. Vojislav Šešelj-Serbian Radical Party-SRS; Aleksandar Vulin-Movement of Socialists-PS; Nenad Popović-Serbian People's Party-SNP; Milica Đurđević Stamenkovski-Serbian Party Oathkeepers-Oathkeepers; Ivan Karić-Greens of Serbia-ZS; Miloš Vučević-Serbian Progressive Party-SNS)	23,142	51.35	40
Citizens' Group: Ivan V. Ćalović–Truth and Honour	6,932	15.38	12
Let's Wake Up Čačak	6,153	13.65	10
Everyone for Čačak (People's Party–Dr. Aleksandar Radojević, New Serbia–Velimir Ilić, Serbian Farmers' Movement, Prof. Dr. Vlaisav Papić, Movement for the Restoration of the Kingdom of Serbia–Goran Petković)	2,885	6.40	4
Čačak Against Violence and New Democratic Party of Serbia (People's Movement of Serbia, Democratic Party, Serbia Centre, New Democratic Party of Serbia, New Face of Serbia)	2,827	6.27	4
Primarius Dr. Milan Roganović–Serbian Movement Dveri–"Boško Obradović–Radmila Živković–Dragan Ćendić–Biljana Rubaković"	2,636	5.85	4
Russian Party–Serbs and Russians Are Brothers Forever!	488	1.08	1
Total	45,063	100.00	75
Valid votes	45,063	97.84	
Invalid/blank votes	994	2.16	
Total votes	46,057	100.00	
Registered voters/turnout	94,167	48.91	
Source: City Election Commission

Twenty-eight of the forty candidates elected on the Čačak Tomorrow list were endorsed by the Serbian Progressive Party, four by the Socialist Party of Serbia, two by the PUPS, and one each by Healthy Serbia, the Movement of Socialists, the Serbian Party Oathkeepers, the Serbian People's Party, the Serbian Radical Party, and the Social Democratic Party of Serbia.

Two of the four candidates elected on the All for Čačak list were endorsed by New Serbia, and one each was endorsed by the Movement for the Restoration of the Kingdom of Serbia and the People's Party.

Two of the four candidates elected on the Čačak Against Violence list were endorsed by the People's Movement of Serbia, and one each was endorsed by the Democratic Party and Serbia Centre.

Incumbent mayor Milun Todorović of the Progressives was confirmed for a new term in office on 19 August 2024.

===== Gornji Milanovac =====
Results of the election for the municipal assembly of Gornji Milanovac:

Party	Votes	%	Seats
Aleksandar Vučić—Gornji Milanovac Tomorrow (Ivica Dačić-Socialist Party of Serbia-SPS; Rasim Ljajić-Social Democratic Party of Serbia-SDP Serbia; Dr. Vojislav Šešelj-Serbian Radical Party-SRS; Milica Đurđević Stamenkovski-Serbian Party Oathkeepers-OATHKEEPERS; Miloš Vučević-Serbian Progressive Party-SNS)	8,717	51.11	27
UZINAT–We Do Not Rent Out Our Place–Dr. Tatjana Milošević	3,713	21.77	11
"We – Power of the People, Prof. Dr. Branimir Nestorović–Dr. Vladislav Vasić" Gornji Milanovac	1,582	9.27	4
I Choose a Better Milanovac (Democratic Party, Movement of Free Citizens, and United Trade Unions "Sloga")	1,232	7.22	3
Citizens' Group: "Dr. Dragica Topalović–Together to Victory" Gornji Milanovac	1,211	7.10	3
Citizens' Group: Takovski Movement	602	3.53	1
Total	17,057	100.00	49
Valid votes	17,057	97.47	
Invalid/blank votes	443	2.53	
Total votes	17,500	100.00	
Registered voters/turnout	34,640	50.52	

Twenty-one of the twenty-seven candidates elected on the Gornji Milanovac Tomorrow list were endorsed by the Serbian Progressive Party, four by the Socialist Party of Serbia, and one each by the Serbian Radical Party and the Social Democratic Party of Serbia.

Two of the three candidates elected on the I Choose a Better Milanovac list were endorsed by the Democratic Party. The other was endorsed by the Movement of Free Citizens.

Incumbent mayor Dejan Kovačević of the Progressives was confirmed for another term in office on 28 June 2024.

===== Ivanjica =====
Results of the election for the municipal assembly of Ivanjica:

Party	Votes	%	Seats
Aleksandar Vučić—Ivanjica Tomorrow (Ivica Dačić-Socialist Party of Serbia-SPS; Milan Krkobabić-Party of United Pensioners, Farmers, and Proletarians of Serbia – Solidarity and Justice-PUPS – Solidarity and Justice; Milan Stamatović-Healthy Serbia-ZS; Dr. Vojislav Šešelj-Serbian Radical Party-SRS; Milica Đurđević Stamenkovski-Serbian Party Oathkeepers-OATHKEEPERS; Miloš Vučević-Serbian Progressive Party-SNS)	5,854	55.57	22
I Choose the Fight for Ivanjica–Miroslav Miki Aleksić–People's Movement of Serbia	2,374	22.54	8
United Opposition–I Vote for a Better Ivanjica–SSP and DS	922	8.75	3
Miloš Parandilović–New Face of Serbia-Ivanjica–Ivan Jovićević	795	7.55	3
Citizens' Group: Household List of Working People	411	3.90	1
POKS and New DSS, NADA for Ivanjica	178	1.69	–
Total	10,534	100.00	37
Valid votes	10,534	97.87	
Invalid/blank votes	229	2.13	
Total votes	10,763	100.00	
Registered voters/turnout	24,676	43.62	

Fourteen of the twenty-two candidates elected on the Ivanjica Tomorrow list were endorsed by the Serbian Progressive Party, five by the Socialist Party of Serbia, and one each by Healthy Serbia, the PUPS, and the Serbian Radical Party.

Two candidates elected on the United Opposition list were endorsed by the Party of Freedom and Justice. The other was endorsed by the Democratic Party.

The candidate elected on the Household List of Working People list was former parliamentarian Milovan Jakovljević of Dveri.

Aleksandar Mitrović of the Progressives was chosen as mayor on 17 July 2024.

===== Lučani =====
There was no election for the municipal assembly of Lučani in 2024. The previous election took place in 2022.

==== Pomoravlje District ====
Local elections were held in the one city (i.e., Jagodina) and one other municipality (i.e., Svilajnac) of the Pomoravlje District. Elections were not held in Ćuprija, Despotovac, Paraćin, and Rekovac, where the previous elections had taken place in 2023.

United Serbia won the election in its home base of Jagodina. Incumbent Svilajnac mayor Predrag Milanović, who had previously been elected at the head of his own citizens' group, made a new alliance with the Serbian Progressive Party before the election and led the party's list to a majority victory.

===== Jagodina =====
Results of the election for the city assembly of Jagodina:

Party	Votes	%	Seats
"Dragan Marković Palma–United Serbia–Ivica Dačić–Socialist Party of Serbia" –For Our Home Jagodina	16,804	58.64	13
Aleksandar Vučić—Jagodina Tomorrow (Miloš Vučević-Serbian Progressive Party-SNS; Rasim Ljajić-Social Democratic Party of Serbia-SDP Serbia; Milica Đurđević Stamenkovski-Serbian Party Oathkeepers-OATHKEEPERS; Milan Krkobabić-Party of United Pensioners, Farmers, and Proletarians of Serbia – Solidarity and Justice-PUPS – Solidarity and Justice; Dr. Vojislav Šešelj-Serbian Radical Party-SRS)	7,517	26.23	6
Maja Radojičić–Miroslav Miki Aleksić, People's Movement of Serbia–Dr. Zoran Lutovac, Democratic Party–"Jagodina Deserves Better" (Jagodina Against Violence, Boris Tadić–Social Democratic Party, Pavle Grbović–Movement of Free Citizens, Ecological Uprising–Ćuta, The Right to Choose)	1,928	6.73	1
"We – Power of the People, Prof. Dr. Branimir Nestorović-Jagodina"	1,200	4.19	1
Dušan Marković–We Will Ask! Actions, Not Words! (BUNT–True Serbia, Serbian Movement Dveri, War Veterans for Serbia, People's Party, New Face of Serbia, Ravna Gora Movement of Jagodina, Jagodina Forward)	805	2.81	–
It Is Time for Changes, Seniors–Mita Arsić–It Depends on Us–My Russia–Jagodina Centre–We Will Not Be Silent	403	1.41	–
Total	28,657	100.00	21
Valid votes	28,657	97.14	
Invalid/blank votes	844	2.86	
Total votes	29,501	100.00	
Registered voters/turnout	63,655	46.35	

Twelve of the thirteen candidates elected on the For Our Home Jagodina list were endorsed by United Serbia, and one was endorsed by the Socialist Party of Serbia. United Serbia leader Dragan Marković Palma was elected from the lead position on the list, and United Serbia parliamentarian Života Starčević was elected from the fourth position.

All six of the candidates elected on the Jagodina Tomorrow list were endorsed by the Serbian Progressive Party.

The candidate elected on the "Jagodina Deserves Better" list was endorsed by the Democratic Party.

Gordana Jovanović of United Serbia was elected as mayor on 17 June 2024. Dragan Marković Palma was elected as assembly president; he later died on 22 November 2024.

===== Ćuprija =====
There was no election for the municipal assembly of Ćuprija in 2024. The previous election took place in 2023.

===== Despotovac =====
There was no election for the municipal assembly of Despotovac in 2024. The previous election took place in 2023.

===== Paraćin =====
There was no election for the municipal assembly of Paraćin in 2024. The previous election took place in 2023.

===== Rekovac =====
There was no election for the municipal assembly of Rekovac in 2024. The previous election took place in 2023.

===== Svilajnac =====
Results of the election for the municipal assembly of Svilajnac:

Party	Votes	%	Seats
Aleksandar Vučić—Svilajnac Tomorrow–Predrag Milanović	7,852	80.49	39
Dr. Tatjana Toskić Lalović–For a Better Svilajnac	1,315	13.48	6
Ivica Dačić–"Socialist Party of Serbia (SPS), Dragan Marković Palma, United Serbia (JS)"	588	6.03	2
Total	9,755	100.00	47
Valid votes	9,755	95.07	
Invalid/blank votes	506	4.93	
Total votes	10,261	100.00	
Registered voters/turnout	23,630	43.42	

One candidate each from the Socialist Party of Serbia and United Serbia was elected on the Ivica Dačić list.

Incumbent mayor Predrag Milanović, who was the list bearer for Svilajnac Tomorrow and previously led his own citizens' group, was confirmed for another term in office on 7 August 2024.

==== Rasina District (Kruševac, Aleksandrovac, Brus, Ćićevac, Trstenik, Varvarin) ====
There were no local elections held in the Rasina District in 2024. The last elections in Kruševac, Aleksandrovac, Brus, Ćićevac, Trstenik, and Varvarin were all held in 2023.

==== Raška District ====
The two cities of the Raška District (Kraljevo and Novi Pazar) had held early elections in 2023 and so did not hold elections in 2024. The other three municipalities of the district, however, held elections as originally scheduled.

The Serbian Progressive Party and its allies won majority victories in Raška and Vrnjačka Banja, while the Party of Democratic Action of Sandžak was able to form a new administration after falling one seat short of a majority in its main support base of Tutin.

===== Kraljevo =====
There was no election for the city assembly of Kraljevo in 2024. The previous election took place in 2023.

===== Novi Pazar =====
There was no election for the city assembly of Novi Pazar in 2024. The previous election took place in 2023.

===== Raška =====
Results of the election for the municipal assembly of Raška:

Party	Votes	%	Seats
Aleksandar Vučić—Raška Tomorrow (Ivica Dačić-Socialist Party of Serbia-SPS; Milan Krkobabić-Party of United Pensioners, Farmers, and Proletarians of Serbia – Solidarity and Justice-PUPS – Solidarity and Justice; Dragan Marković Palma-United Serbia-JS; Dr. Vojislav Šešelj-Serbian Radical Party-SRS; Milica Đurđević Stamenkovski-Serbian Party Oathkeepers-OATHKEEPERS; Ivan Karić-Greens of Serbia-ZS; Miloš Vučević-Serbian Progressive Party-SNS)	8,261	74.69	27
Citizens' Group: Raška for the People of Raška	1,978	17.88	6
We Choose Better–Raška for Change–Zorica Đorđević–(People's Movement of Serbia, Democratic Party)	821	7.42	2
Total	11,060	100.00	35
Valid votes	11,060	97.12	
Invalid/blank votes	328	2.88	
Total votes	11,388	100.00	
Registered voters/turnout	19,337	58.89	

Twenty of the twenty-seven candidates elected on the Raška Tomorrow list were endorsed by the Serbian Progressive Party, four were endorsed by the Socialist Party of Serbia, and one each was endorsed by the PUPS, the Serbian Radical Party, and United Serbia.

One candidate each from the People's Movement of Serbia and the Democratic Party was elected from the We Choose Better–Raška for Change list.

Darko Milićević of the Progressives was chosen as mayor on 26 June 2024.

===== Tutin =====
Results of the election for the municipal assembly of Tutin:

Party	Votes	%	Seats
SDA Sandžak–Dr. Sulejman Ugljanin (Party of Democratic Action of Sandžak)	6,616	45.87	18
Mufti's Legacy for Proud Tutin–Usame Zukorlić (Justice and Reconciliation Party)	2,290	15.88	6
Wake Up, People–Lejla Redžematović (Sandžak Democratic Party, Serbian Progressive Party)	2,260	15.67	6
Our Choice–Zaim Redžepović (Citizens' Group: Tutin–Our City)	1,161	8.05	3
Tutin in First Place–Bajro Gegić (Citizens' Group: Sandžak in the Heart–Tutin in First Place)	869	6.03	2
We Will, We Can Do Better for Tutin–Adnan Šehović (Citizens' Group: Justice and Development Movement)	623	4.32	1
Citizens' Group: Allied for Tutin–Ljutvija Balkan and Jašar Balić	603	4.18	1
Total	14,422	100.00	37
Valid votes	14,422	99.15	
Invalid/blank votes	123	0.85	
Total votes	14,545	100.00	
Registered voters/turnout	33,030	44.04	

Five of the six candidates elected on the Wake Up, People list were endorsed by the Sandžak Democratic Party, and one was endorsed by the Serbian Progressive Party.

Selma Kučević of the SDA Sandžak was chosen as mayor on 1 August 2024.

===== Vrnjačka Banja =====
Results of the election for the municipal assembly of Vrnjačka Banja:

Party	Votes	%	Seats
Aleksandar Vučić—Vrnjačka Banja Tomorrow (Ivica Dačić-Socialist Party of Serbia-SPS; Rasim Ljajić–Social Democratic Party of Serbia–SDP Serbia; Milan Krkobabić-Party of United Pensioners, Farmers, and Proletarians of Serbia – Solidarity and Justice-PUPS – Solidarity and Justice; Dragan Marković Palma-United Serbia-JS; Dr. Vojislav Šešelj-Serbian Radical Party-SRS; Aleksandar Vulin–Movement of Socialists–PS; Milica Đurđević Stamenkovski-Serbian Party Oathkeepers-OATHKEEPERS; Ivan Karić-Greens of Serbia-ZS; Miloš Vučević-Serbian Progressive Party-SNS)	9,680	74.26	19
And I Am Vrnjačka Banja–I Choose the Fight–Radosav Pejović (People's Movement of Serbia, New Face of Serbia)	2,291	17.58	4
DS–United Opposition of Vrnjačka Banja–Dr. Ljubiša Karamarković (Democratic Party)	1,064	8.16	2
Total	13,035	100.00	25
Valid votes	13,035	97.43	
Invalid/blank votes	344	2.57	
Total votes	13,379	100.00	
Registered voters/turnout	23,380	57.22	

Twelve of the candidates elected on the Vrnjačka Banja list were endorsed by the Serbian Progressive Party, two by United Serbia, and one each by the Movement of Socialists, the PUPS, the Serbian Radical Party, the Social Democratic Party of Serbia, and the Socialist Party of Serbia.

Three of the candidates elected on the And I Am Vrnjačka Banja list were endorsed by the People's Movement of Serbia, and one was endorsed by the New Face of Serbia.

Incumbent mayor Boban Đurović of the Progressives was confirmed for another term in office on 5 July 2024.

==== Šumadija District (Kragujevac, Aranđelovac, Batočina, Knić, Lapovo, Rača, Topola) ====
There were no local elections held in the Šumadija District in 2024. The last election in Aranđelovac was held in 2022, and the last elections in Kragujevac, Batočina, Knić, Lapovo, Rača, and Topola were held in 2023.

==== Zlatibor District ====
Local elections were held in the one city (i.e., Užice) and four of the nine separate municipalities of the Zlatibor District. Elections were not held in Kosjerić (which held a regularly scheduled off-year election in 2021), Bajina Bašta (which held an early election 2022), and Požega, Priboj, and Prijepolje (which held early elections in 2023).

The Serbian Progressive Party's alliance won majority victories in Arilje and Nova Varoš. In Užice, the alliance fell one seat short of a majority and formed a coalition government with Healthy Serbia. Healthy Serbia leader Milan Stamatović led his coalition to a majority victory in Čajetina, and in Sjenica the Justice and Reconciliation Party formed government with the Progressive alliance.

The city of Užice is divided into two municipalities: Užice and Sevojno. The municipality of Užice does not have direct assembly elections: members of the city assembly also serve at the municipal level. Delegates to the Sevojno municipal assembly are directly elected, although there was no election in 2024; the previous vote had taken place in a regularly scheduled off-year election in 2022.

===== Užice =====
Results of the election for the city assembly of Užice:

Party	Votes	%	Seats
Aleksandar Vučić—Užice Tomorrow (Ivica Dačić-Socialist Party of Serbia-SPS; Rasim Ljajić-Social Democratic Party of Serbia-SDP Serbia; Milan Krkobabić-Party of United Pensioners, Farmers, and Proletarians of Serbia – Solidarity and Justice-PUPS – Solidarity and Justice; Dragan Marković Palma-United Serbia-JS; Dr. Vojislav Šešelj-Serbian Radical Party-SRS; Nenad Popović-Serbian People's Party-SNP; Milica Đurđević Stamenkovski-Serbian Party Oathkeepers-OATHKEEPERS; Miloš Vučević-Serbian Progressive Party-SNS)	14,127	46.38	33
Citizens' Group: May Užice Have a Future–Glišo Vidović (Sloga Užice)	4,524	14.85	10
Užice Democratic Front–Dr. Željko Bacotić (Democratic Party, Serbia Centre)	3,445	11.31	8
Citizens' Group: Užice Defense League–Užice Action–Our City–Our People	2,599	8.53	6
Milan Stamatović–Healthy Serbia	2,056	6.75	4
We Choose the Fight, We Choose Užice (Jovanka Lučić–Bojan Mitrović–Green–Left Front and People's Movement of Serbia)	1,754	5.76	4
New Democratic Party of Serbia (New DSS)–Branko Đurić–New Face of Serbia (NLS)–Miloš Parandilović–For a New Užice	1,172	3.85	2
Ivana Parlić The Best for Užice, Patriotic Coalition Dveri–People's Party–POKS	780	2.56	–
Total	30,457	100.00	67
Valid votes	30,457	97.87	
Invalid/blank votes	663	2.13	
Total votes	31,120	100.00	
Registered voters/turnout	63,393	49.09	

Twenty-two of the thirty-three candidates elected on the Užice Tomorrow list were endorsed by the Serbian Progressive Party, three by the Socialist Party of Serbia, two each by the Serbian Party Oathkeepers and the Social Democratic Party of Serbia, and one each by United Serbia, the PUPS, the Serbian People's Party, and the Serbian Radical Party.

Five of the eight candidates elected on the Užice Democratic Front list were endorsed by the Democratic Party; the other three were endorsed by Serbia Centre. Of the four candidates elected on the We Choose the Fight, We Choose Užice list, two each were endorsed by the Green–Left Front and the People's Movement of Serbia. One candidate each elected on the For a New Užice list was endorsed by the New Democratic Party of Serbia and the New Face of Serbia.

Former parliamentarian Ivana Parlić of the People's Party led the Patriotic Coalition list. Bogoljub Zečević of the Movement for the Kingdom of Serbia appeared in the second position.

The Serbian Progressive Party's alliance formed a coalition government with Healthy Serbia, and incumbent mayor Jelena Raković Radivojević of the Progressive Party was confirmed for a new term in office on 1 July 2024.

====== Užice: Sevojno ======
There was no election for the municipal assembly of Sevojno in 2024. The previous election took place in 2022, and the next election took place in 2026.

===== Arilje =====
Results of the election for the municipal assembly of Arilje:

Party	Votes	%	Seats
Aleksandar Vučić—Arilje Tomorrow (Ivica Dačić-Socialist Party of Serbia-SPS; Rasim Ljajić-Social Democratic Party of Serbia-SDP Serbia; Milan Krkobabić-Party of United Pensioners, Farmers, and Proletarians of Serbia – Solidarity and Justice-PUPS – Solidarity and Justice; Milan Stamatović–Healthy Serbia–ZS; Milica Đurđević Stamenkovski-Serbian Party Oathkeepers-OATHKEEPERS; Miloš Vučević-Serbian Progressive Party-SNS)	3,178	52.87	18
United for Arilje (Democratic Party–Dr. Zoran Lutovac, People's Movement of Serbia–Miroslav Aleksić, New Face of Serbia–Miloš Parandilović)	1,431	23.81	8
NADA for Arilje–Marija Prodanović–Serbian Coalition NADA–National Democratic Alternative–Movement for the Restoration of the Kingdom of Serbia (POKS)–New Democratic Party of Serbia (Novi DSS)–For the Kingdom of Serbia (Monarchists)	834	13.87	4
Citizens' Group: I Love Arilje	568	9.45	3
Total	6,011	100.00	33
Valid votes	6,011	95.95	
Invalid/blank votes	254	4.05	
Total votes	6,265	100.00	
Registered voters/turnout	14,905	42.03	

Twelve of the eighteen candidates elected on the Arilje Tomorrow list were endorsed by the Serbian Progressive Party, two by the PUPS, and one each by Healthy Serbia, the Serbian Party Oathkeepers, the Social Democratic Party of Serbia, and the Socialist Party of Serbia.

Four of the eight candidates elected on the United for Arilje list were endorsed by the Democratic Party, three by the People's Movement of Serbia, and one by the New Face of Serbia. Of the four candidates elected on the NADA for Arilje list, two each were endorsed by the Movement of the Restoration of the Kingdom of Serbia and the New Democratic Party of Serbia.

Incumbent mayor Predrag Maslar of the Progressive Party was confirmed for another term in office on 12 July 2024.

===== Bajina Bašta =====
There was no election for the municipal assembly of Bajina Bašta in 2024. The previous election took place in 2022, and the next election took place in 2026.

===== Ćajetina =====
Results of the election for the municipal assembly of Čajetina:

Party	Votes	%	Seats
Milan Stamatović–Healthy Serbia (Coalition: Healthy Serbia–Party of United Pensioners, Farmers, and Proletarians of Serbia – Solidarity and Justice (PUPS))	4,943	57.59	19
Citizens' Group: Our People for Our Place–Marko Pantović	2,130	24.82	8
Aleksandar Vučić—Čajetina Tomorrow (Ivica Dačić-Socialist Party of Serbia-SPS; Dr. Vojislav Šešelj-Serbian Radical Party-SRS; Milica Đurđević Stamenkovski-Serbian Party Oathkeepers-OATHKEEPERS; Miloš Vučević-Serbian Progressive Party-SNS)	1,261	14.69	4
Miloš Parandilović–New Face of Serbia–I Choose the Fight	249	2.90	–
Total	8,583	100.00	31
Valid votes	8,583	97.21	
Invalid/blank votes	246	2.79	
Total votes	8,829	100.00	
Registered voters/turnout	13,524	65.28	

Sixteen of the candidates elected on Stamatović's coalition list were endorsed by Healthy Serbia. The other three were endorsed by the PUPS.

Three of the four candidates elected on the Čajetina Tomorrow list were endorsed by the Serbian Progressive Party. The other was endorsed by the Socialist Party of Serbia. Former parliamentarian Đorđe Dabić of the SNS was re-elected from the fourth list position.

Healthy Serbia leader Milan Stamatović was confirmed for a sixth consecutive term as mayor on 13 July 2024.

===== Kosjerić =====
There was no election for the municipal assembly of Kosjerić in 2024. The previous election took place in 2021, and the next election took place in 2025.

===== Nova Varoš =====
Results of the election for the municipal assembly of Nova Varoš:

Party	Votes	%	Seats
"Aleksandar Vučić—Nova Varoš Tomorrow (Ivica Dačić-Socialist Party of Serbia-SPS; Milan Krkobabić-Party of United Pensioners, Farmers, and Proletarians of Serbia – Solidarity and Justice-PUPS – Solidarity and Justice; Milan Stamatović–Healthy Serbia–ZS; Milica Đurđević Stamenkovski-Serbian Party Oathkeepers-OATHKEEPERS; Miloš Vučević-Serbian Progressive Party-SNS)"	3,706	50.08	15
Unanimously for Nova Varoš–Democratic Party, Serbian Movement Dveri, New Democratic Party of Serbia, Movement for the Restoration of the Kingdom of Serbia	1,461	19.74	5
"Dimitrije Paunović–Survival–Because We Can Do Better"	1,311	17.72	5
Miloš Parandilović–New Face of Serbia–I Choose the Fight	463	6.26	1
Citizens' Group: Bosniak Civic Initiative–And My Voice Matters, Unity for a Better Tomorrow	349	4.72	1
Bosniak-Serb Alliance-BOSS–Samir Tandir	110	1.49	–
Total	7,400	100.00	27
Valid votes	7,400	97.45	
Invalid/blank votes	194	2.55	
Total votes	7,594	100.00	
Registered voters/turnout	12,488	60.81	

Eleven of the fifteen candidates elected on the Nova Varoš Tomorrow list were endorsed by the Serbian Progressive Party, three by the Socialist Party of Serbia, and one by Healthy Serbia.

Three of the five candidates elected on the Unanimously for Nova Varoš list were endorsed by the Democratic Party. The other two were endorsed by Dveri.

Branko Bjelić of the Progressives was chosen as mayor on 2 July 2024.

===== Požega =====
There was no election for the municipal assembly of Požega in 2024. The previous election took place in 2023.

===== Priboj =====
There was no election for the municipal assembly of Priboj in 2024. The previous election took place in 2023.

===== Prijepolje =====
There was no election for the municipal assembly of Prijepolje in 2024. The previous election took place in 2023.

===== Sjenica =====
Results of the election for the municipal assembly of Sjenica:

Party	Votes	%	Seats
Mufti's Legacy, President Munib–Usame Zukorlić (Justice and Reconciliation Party)	2,850	21.65	9
SDA Sandžak–Dr. Sulejman Ugljanin	2,685	20.39	8
Aleksandar Vučić—Sjenica Tomorrow (Ivica Dačić-Socialist Party of Serbia-SPS; Dr. Vojislav Šešelj-Serbian Radical Party-SRS; Milica Đurđević Stamenkovski-Serbian Party Oathkeepers-OATHKEEPERS; Miloš Vučević-Serbian Progressive Party-SNS)	1,849	14.04	6
SDP–SDPS–Rasim Ljajić–New People for New Times (Sandžak Democratic Party, Social Democratic Party of Serbia)	1,784	13.55	5
Citizens' Group: "Without Discrimination"–Aldin Dino Kurtović	1,526	11.59	5
Citizens' Group: For the Future and Development of Sjenica–Fadil Nikšić	1,225	9.30	4
Bosniak-Serb Alliance-BOSS–Samir Tandir–Momir Kovačević–New People New Strength of Serbia	439	3.33	1
Veroljub Veran Karličić–New Democratic Party of Serbia (Novi DSS)–New Face of Serbia (NLS)–Miloš Parandilović	425	3.23	1
Citizens' Group: Bijo je dosta–Mulka Zornić	213	1.62	–
Citizens' Group: Sjenica in the Heart–Aziz Tahirović Ziko	171	1.30	–
Total	13,167	100.00	39
Valid votes	13,167	98.34	
Invalid/blank votes	222	1.66	
Total votes	13,389	100.00	
Registered voters/turnout	27,421	48.83	

Minela Kalender was elected to the assembly from the fourth position on the SDA Sandžak's list.

Four of the six candidates elected on the Sjenica Tomorrow list were endorsed by the Serbian Progressive Party. The other two were endorsed by the Socialist Party of Serbia.

Three of the five candidates elected on the New People for New Times list were endorsed by the Sandžak Democratic Party. The other two were endorsed by the Social Democratic Party of Serbia.

Veroljub Karličić of the New Democratic Party of Serbia was the delegate elected on the Novi DSS–NLS list.

Munib Mujagić of the Justice and Reconciliation Party was chosen as mayor on 27 August 2024. The government was supported by the Progressive alliance, the Without Discrimination list, and the representative elected from the New Democratic Party of Serbia.

=== Southern and Eastern Serbia ===
==== Nišava District ====
In the Nišava District, local elections were held for the Niš city assembly, the assemblies in all five of Niš's constituent municipalities, and the assemblies of Aleksinac and Svrljig.

Elections were not held in Doljevac, Gadžin Han, Merošina, and Ražanj. In each of these municipalities, the last local election took place in 2023.

The Serbian Progressive Party and its allies won the city election in Niš and formed government under extremely contentious circumstances. The Progressives also won in four of Niš's municipalities and in Aleksic. The United Peasant Party won in its home base of Svrljig and afterward formed a coalition government with the Progressives.

The combined opposition forces won a majority victory in the Niš municipality of Medijana and formed government with a representative of Dragan Milić's political group in the role of mayor. As of 2024, Medijana is the only municipality in Serbia with a majority Serb population where the local government is formed by parties opposed to the Progressives at the republic level.

===== Niš =====
The official preliminary results of the city assembly of Niš election showed that the Progressive Party's alliance would command a narrow majority in the assembly, supported by the single delegate from the Russian Party. Opposition parties charged electoral fraud and contended that the four opposition lists that crossed the threshold (i.e., Dragan Milić's list, We Choose Niš, Go-Change, and NADA) actually won a narrow majority victory with thirty-one seats. The opposition noted that initial projections and their own internal data showed the SNS alliance with only twenty-nine seats. Dragan Milić called on the SNS to "admit what the whole of Serbia knows, which is that you lost Niš."

Ultimately, the official final results (listed below) were not significantly different from the preliminary totals and showed the same distribution of seats.

Party	Votes	%	Seats
Aleksandar Vučić—Niš Tomorrow (Ivica Dačić-Socialist Party of Serbia-SPS; Rasim Ljajić-Social Democratic Party of Serbia-SDP Serbia; Milan Krkobabić-Party of United Pensioners, Farmers, and Proletarians of Serbia – Solidarity and Justice-PUPS – Solidarity and Justice; Dragan Marković Palma-United Serbia-JS; Dr. Vojislav Šešelj-Serbian Radical Party-SRS; Aleksandar Vulin-Movement of Socialists-PS; Milica Đurđević Stamenkovski-Serbian Party Oathkeepers-OATHKEEPERS; Ivan Karić-Greens of Serbia-ZS; Miloš Vučević-Serbian Progressive Party-SNS)	49,230	45.07	30
Citizens' Group: Dr. Dragan Milić	27,211	24.91	16
We Choose Niš–Đorđe Stanković (People's Movement of Serbia, Democratic Party, Green–Left Front, Movement of Free Citizens)	17,914	16.40	10
Citizens' Group: Dr. Savo Manojlović–I'm Niš Too–Go-Change	4,371	4.00	2
United–NADA for Niš–Miodrag Stanković–New Democratic Party of Serbia (New DSS)–Niš, My City–People's Party (NS)–Social Democratic Party (SDS)–Enough Is Enough (DJB)–Democratic Union of Roma (DUR)	4,307	3.94	2
Niš, Our City–Branislav Bane Jovanović–New Face of Serbia–Miloš Parandilović	2,239	2.05	–
Russian Party–Russia and Niš in the Heart!–Tihomir Perić	1,223	1.12	1
Citizens' Group: Bojan Avramović–We Don't Give Up Niš	796	0.73	–
The Voice of the People Is the Strength of the People (BUNT–True Serbia, Veterans)	712	0.65	–
United for the Village and the City–Let's Be Clean (Green Party of Serbia)	637	0.58	–
For Our Niš–Petar Bogičević–Coalition "Strength" (Party of Montenegrins, Civic Party of Greeks of Serbia)	597	0.55	–
Total	109,237	100.00	61
Valid votes	109,237	98.26	
Invalid/blank votes	1,933	1.74	
Total votes	111,170	100.00	
Registered voters/turnout	226,268	49.13	

Twenty-one of the thirty candidates elected on the Niš Tomorrow list were endorsed by the Serbian Progressive Party, three by the Socialist Party of Serbia, and one each by the Movement of Socialists, the PUPS, the Serbian Party Oathkeepers, the Serbian Radical Party, the Social Democratic Party of Serbia, and United Serbia.

Seven of the ten candidates elected on the We Choose Niš list were endorsed by the People's Movement of Serbia, although not all were party members. One delegate each was endorsed by the Democratic Party, the Green–Left Front, and the Movement of Free Citizens. Dveri was not officially part of the We Choose Niš alliance, but two of its members were elected on the alliance's electoral list: former local board president Tamara Milenković Kerković (second position) and Andrej Mitić (tenth position). Formally, their endorsements were from the People's Movement of Serbia. Both Milenković Kerković and Mitić left Dveri in September 2024.

Both of the candidates elected on the United list were endorsed by the New Democratic Party of Serbia.

Dragoslav Pavlović of the Progressives was chosen as mayor in a marathon assembly session on 12–13 August 2024.

====== Niš: Crveni Krst ======
Repeat voting was held for certain polling stations on 23 June 2024. The final results of election for the Crveni Krst municipal assembly were as follows:

Party	Votes	%	Seats
Aleksandar Vučić—Crveni Krst Tomorrow (Ivica Dačić-Socialist Party of Serbia-SPS; Rasim Ljajić-Social Democratic Party of Serbia-SDP Serbia; Milan Krkobabić-Party of United Pensioners, Farmers, and Proletarians of Serbia – Solidarity and Justice-PUPS – Solidarity and Justice; Dragan Marković Palma-United Serbia-JS; Dr. Vojislav Šešelj-Serbian Radical Party-SRS; Aleksandar Vulin-Movement of Socialists-PS; Milica Đurđević Stamenkovski-Serbian Party Oathkeepers-OATHKEEPERS; Miloš Vučević-Serbian Progressive Party-SNS)	7,549	55.97	12
Citizens' Group: Dr. Dragan Milić	2,015	14.94	3
We Choose Niš–We Choose Crveni Krst–Saša Stojanović (People's Movement of Serbia, Democratic Party, Green–Left Front, Movement of Free Citizens)	1,367	10.13	2
United–NADA for Niš–Miodrag Stanković–New Democratic Party of Serbia (New DSS)–Niš, My City–People's Party (NS)–Social Democratic Party (SDS)–Enough Is Enough (DJB)–Democratic Union of Roma (DUR)	723	5.36	1
A B'e Niš Bre!!–Milan Stojanović	665	4.93	1
Niš, Our City–Branislav Bane Jovanović–Ljubiša Nikolić Libe–New Face of Serbia–Miloš Parandilović	524	3.88	1
The Voice of the People Is the Strength of the People–Dr. Miloš Stojanović (BUNT–True Serbia, Veterans)	407	3.02	1
United for the Village and the City–Let's Be Clean (Green Party of Serbia)	125	0.93	–
Citizens' Group: Bojan Avramović–We Don't Give Up Niš	113	0.84	–
Total	13,488	100.00	21
Valid votes	13,488	97.61	
Invalid/blank votes	330	2.39	
Total votes	13,818	100.00	
Registered voters/turnout	29,188	47.34	

Eight of the twelve candidates elected on the Crveni Krst Tomorrow list were endorsed by the Serbian Progressive Party, and one each was endorsed by the Movement of Socialists, the PUPS, the Serbian Radical Party, and the Socialist Party of Serbia.

Both candidates elected on the We Choose Niš–We Choose Crveni Krst list were endorsed by the People's Movement of Serbia. The candidate elected on the United list was endorsed by the New Democratic Party of Serbia. The candidate elected on the Niš Our City–New Face of Serbia list was endorsed by the New Face of Serbia.

The candidate elected on the Voice of the People Is the Strength of the People list was endorsed by BUNT–True Serbia.

Incumbent mayor Miroslav Milutinović of the Progressives was chosen for another term in office on 18 July 2024.

====== Niš: Medijana ======
Repeated elections took place in two polling stations in Medijana on 16 June. After the repeat vote, the election commission announced that the combined opposition won 16 seats as against 11 for the SNS coalition:

Party	Votes	%	Seats
Aleksandar Vučić—Medijana Tomorrow (Ivica Dačić-Socialist Party of Serbia-SPS; Rasim Ljajić-Social Democratic Party of Serbia-SDP Serbia; Milan Krkobabić-Party of United Pensioners, Farmers, and Proletarians of Serbia – Solidarity and Justice-PUPS – Solidarity and Justice; Dragan Marković Palma-United Serbia-JS; Dr. Vojislav Šešelj-Serbian Radical Party-SRS; Aleksandar Vulin-Movement of Socialists-PS; Milica Đurđević Stamenkovski-Serbian Party Oathkeepers-OATHKEEPERS; Miloš Vučević-Serbian Progressive Party-SNS)	15,220	38.97	11
Citizens' Group: Dr. Dragan Milić	11,000	28.16	8
We Choose Niš–We Choose Medijana–Miloš Bošković (People's Movement of Serbia, Democratic Party, Green–Left Front, Movement of Free Citizens)	8,317	21.29	6
United–NADA for Niš–Miodrag Stanković–New Democratic Party of Serbia (New DSS)–Niš, My City–People's Party (NS)–Social Democratic Party (SDS)–Enough Is Enough (DJB)–Democratic Union of Roma (DUR)	2,754	7.05	2
Niš, Our City–Branislav Bane Jovanović–Ljubiša Nikolić Libe–New Face of Serbia–Miloš Parandilović	747	1.91	–
Russian Party–Russia and Niš in the Heart!–Tihomir Perić	687	1.76	–
Citizens' Group: Bojan Avramović–We Don't Give Up Niš	333	0.85	–
Total	39,058	100.00	27
Valid votes	39,058	98.56	
Invalid/blank votes	570	1.44	
Total votes	39,628	100.00	
Registered voters/turnout	76,820	51.59	

Nine of the eleven candidates elected on the Medijana Tomorrow list were endorsed by the Serbian Progressive Party, and one each was endorsed by the Socialist Party of Serbia and United Serbia.

Three of the six candidates elected on the We Choose Niš–We Choose Medijana list were endorsed by the People's Movement of Serbia, two by the Democratic Party, and one by the Green–Left Front. Both candidates elected on the United list were endorsed by the New Democratic Party of Serbia.

Mladen Đurić of the Dr. Dragan Milić list was chosen as mayor on 30 July 2024.

====== Niš: Niška Banja ======
Results of the election for the municipal assembly of Niška Banja:

Party	Votes	%	Seats
Aleksandar Vučić—Niška Banja Tomorrow (Ivica Dačić-Socialist Party of Serbia-SPS; Rasim Ljajić-Social Democratic Party of Serbia-SDP Serbia; Milan Krkobabić-Party of United Pensioners, Farmers, and Proletarians of Serbia – Solidarity and Justice-PUPS – Solidarity and Justice; Dragan Marković Palma-United Serbia-JS; Dr. Vojislav Šešelj-Serbian Radical Party-SRS; Milica Đurđević Stamenkovski-Serbian Party Oathkeepers-OATHKEEPERS; Miloš Vučević-Serbian Progressive Party-SNS)	3,811	62.32	12
Citizens' Group: Dr. Dragan Milić	1,221	19.97	4
We Choose an Independent and Strong Municipality–Zoran Vidanović (People's Movement of Serbia, Democratic Party, Green–Left Front, Movement of Free Citizens)	383	6.26	1
United–NADA for Niš–Miodrag Stanković–NADA for Banja–Jovan Jovanović–New Democratic Party of Serbia (New DSS)–Niš, My City–People's Party (NS)–Social Democratic Party (SDS)–Enough Is Enough (DJB)–Democratic Union of Roma (DUR)	293	4.79	1
Niš, Our City–Branislav Bane Jovanović–New Face of Serbia–Miloš Parandilović	236	3.86	1
United for the Village and the City–Let's Be Clean (Green Party of Serbia)	171	2.80	–
Total	6,115	100.00	19
Valid votes	6,115	98.19	
Invalid/blank votes	113	1.81	
Total votes	6,228	100.00	
Registered voters/turnout	11,612	53.63	

Eight of the twelve candidates elected on the Niška Banja Tomorrow list were endorsed by the Serbian Progressive Party, two by United Serbia, and one each by the PUPS and the Socialist Party of Serbia.

The candidate elected on the We Choose an Independent and Strong Municipality list was endorsed by the People's Movement of Serbia. The candidate elected on the United list was endorsed by the New Democratic Party of Serbia. The candidate elected on the Niš, Our City–New Face of Serbia list was endorsed by the New Face of Serbia.

Incumbent mayor Dušan Živković of the Progressives was confirmed for another term in office on 18 July 2024.

====== Niš: Palilula ======
Results of the election for the municipal assembly of Palilula, Niš:

Party	Votes	%	Seats
Aleksandar Vučić—Palilula Tomorrow (Ivica Dačić-Socialist Party of Serbia-SPS; Rasim Ljajić-Social Democratic Party of Serbia-SDP Serbia; Milan Krkobabić-Party of United Pensioners, Farmers, and Proletarians of Serbia – Solidarity and Justice-PUPS – Solidarity and Justice; Dragan Marković Palma-United Serbia-JS; Dr. Vojislav Šešelj-Serbian Radical Party-SRS; Aleksandar Vulin-Movement of Socialists-PS; Milica Đurđević Stamenkovski-Serbian Party Oathkeepers-OATHKEEPERS; Miloš Vučević-Serbian Progressive Party-SNS)	13,927	48.42	14
Citizens' Group: Dr. Dragan Milić	6,862	23.86	6
We Choose Niš–We Choose Palilula–Aleksandar Živadinović (People's Movement of Serbia, Democratic Party, Green–Left Front, Movement of Free Citizens)	4,289	14.91	4
United–NADA for Niš–Miodrag Stanković–New Democratic Party of Serbia (New DSS)–Niš, My City–People's Party (NS)–Social Democratic Party (SDS)–Enough Is Enough (DJB)–Democratic Union of Roma (DUR)	1,810	6.29	1
Russian Party–Russia and Niš in the Heart!–Tihomir Perić	506	1.76	–
We – Voice from the People	432	1.50	–
For Our Palilula–Petar Bogičević–Coalition "Strength" (Party of Montenegrins, Civic Party of Greeks of Serbia, Bunjevci Citizens of Serbia)	367	1.28	–
Citizens' Group: Bojan Avramović–We Don't Give Up Niš	324	1.13	–
United for the Village and the City–Let's Be Clean (Green Party of Serbia)	246	0.86	–
Total	28,763	100.00	25
Valid votes	28,763	98.28	
Invalid/blank votes	502	1.72	
Total votes	29,265	100.00	
Registered voters/turnout	63,325	46.21	

Eight of the fourteen candidates elected on the Palilula Tomorrow list were endorsed by the Serbian Progressive Party, and one each was endorsed by the Movement of Socialists, the PUPS, the Serbian Party Oathkeepers, the Serbian Radical Party, the Socialist Party of Serbia, and United Serbia.

Three of the four candidates elected on the We Choose Niš–We Choose Palilula list were endorsed by the People's Movement of Serbia, and one was endorsed by the Democratic Party. The candidate elected on the United list was endorsed by the New Democratic Party of Serbia.

Incumbent mayor Bratislav Vučković of the Progressives was confirmed for another term in office on 18 July 2024.

====== Niš: Pantelej ======
Results of the election for the municipal assembly of Pantelej:

Party	Votes	%	Seats
Aleksandar Vučić—Pantelej Tomorrow (Ivica Dačić-Socialist Party of Serbia-SPS; Rasim Ljajić-Social Democratic Party of Serbia-SDP Serbia; Milan Krkobabić-Party of United Pensioners, Farmers, and Proletarians of Serbia – Solidarity and Justice-PUPS – Solidarity and Justice; Dragan Marković Palma-United Serbia-JS; Dr. Vojislav Šešelj-Serbian Radical Party-SRS; Aleksandar Vulin-Movement of Socialists-PS; Milica Đurđević Stamenkovski-Serbian Party Oathkeepers-OATHKEEPERS; Miloš Vučević-Serbian Progressive Party-SNS)	10,239	47.61	12
Citizens' Group: Dr. Dragan Milić	4,922	22.88	6
We Choose Niš–We Choose Pantelej–Ljubomir Kostić (People's Movement of Serbia, Democratic Party, Green–Left Front, Movement of Free Citizens)	3,982	18.51	4
United–NADA for Niš–Miodrag Stanković–New Democratic Party of Serbia (New DSS)–Niš, My City–People's Party (NS)–Social Democratic Party (SDS)–Enough Is Enough (DJB)–Democratic Union of Roma (DUR)	980	4.56	1
Niš, Our City–Branislav Bane Jovanović–New Face of Serbia–Miloš Parandilović	397	1.85	–
Russian Party–Russia and Niš in the Heart!–Tihomir Perić	355	1.65	–
The Voice of the People Is the Strength of the People–Prof. Dragan Jovanović (BUNT–True Serbia, Veterans)	241	1.12	–
Citizens' Group: Bojan Avramović–We Don't Give Up Niš	223	1.04	–
United for the Village and the City–Let's Be Clean (Green Party of Serbia)	169	0.79	–
Total	21,508	100.00	23
Valid votes	21,508	98.37	
Invalid/blank votes	357	1.63	
Total votes	21,865	100.00	
Registered voters/turnout	45,315	48.25	

Eight of the twelve candidates elected on the Pantelej Tomorrow list were endorsed by the Serbian Progressive Party, and one each was endorsed by the PUPS, the Serbian Party Oathkeepers, the Socialist Party of Serbia, and United Serbia.

All four of the candidates elected on the We Choose Niš–We Choose Pantelej list were endorsed by the People's Movement of Serbia. The candidate elected on the United list was endorsed by the New Democratic Party of Serbia.

Dragan Pavlović of the Progressives was chosen as mayor on 12 July 2024.

===== Aleksinac =====
Results of the election for the municipal assembly of Aleksinac:

Party	Votes	%	Seats
Aleksandar Vučić—Aleksinac Tomorrow (Ivica Dačić-Socialist Party of Serbia-SPS; Rasim Ljajić-Social Democratic Party of Serbia-SDP Serbia; Milan Krkobabić-Party of United Pensioners, Farmers, and Proletarians of Serbia – Solidarity and Justice-PUPS – Solidarity and Justice; Dragan Marković Palma-United Serbia-JS; Dr. Vojislav Šešelj-Serbian Radical Party-SRS; Aleksandar Vulin-Movement of Socialists-PS; Milica Đurđević Stamenkovski-Serbian Party Oathkeepers-OATHKEEPERS; Miloš Vučević-Serbian Progressive Party-SNS)	9,433	62.06	26
Citizens' Group: Waking Up	2,504	16.47	7
Citizens' Group: Changes Immediately–For the Municipality of Aleksinac–Ivan Dimić–Boban Ranđelović	1,679	11.05	4
Dr. Dragan Branković–Honesty Is the Best Policy (Dveri, Movement for the Restoration of the Kingdom of Serbia, Party of Freedom and Justice)	1,585	10.43	4
Total	15,201	100.00	41
Valid votes	15,201	97.37	
Invalid/blank votes	410	2.63	
Total votes	15,611	100.00	
Registered voters/turnout	39,922	39.10	

Nineteen of the twenty-six candidates elected on the Aleksinac Tomorrow list were endorsed by the Serbian Progressive Party, four were endorsed by the Socialist Party of Serbia, and one each was endorsed by the Serbian Radical Party, the Social Democratic Party of Serbia, and United Serbia.

Two of the four candidates elected on the Honesty Is the Best Policy list were endorsed by the Movement for the Restoration of the Kingdom of Serbia, and one each was endorsed by Dveri and the Party of Freedom and Justice.

Incumbent mayor Dalibor Radičević of the Progressives was confirmed for a new term in office on 18 July 2024.

===== Doljevac =====
There was no election for the municipal assembly of Doljevac in 2024. The previous election took place in 2023.

===== Gadžin Han =====
There was no election for the municipal assembly of Gadžin Han in 2024. The previous election took place in 2023.

===== Merošina =====
There was no election for the municipal assembly of Merošina in 2024. The previous election took place in 2023.

===== Ražanj =====
There was no election for the municipal assembly of Ražanj in 2024. The previous election took place in 2023.

===== Svrljig =====
Results of the election for the municipal assembly of Svrljig:

Party	Votes	%	Seats
We Know Each Other–Milija Miletić (United Peasant Party)	2,714	43.42	12
Aleksandar Vučić—Svrljig Tomorrow (Ivica Dačić-Socialist Party of Serbia-SPS; Milan Krkobabić-Party of United Pensioners, Farmers, and Proletarians of Serbia – Solidarity and Justice-PUPS – Solidarity and Justice; Dragan Marković Palma-United Serbia-JS; Dr. Vojislav Šešelj-Serbian Radical Party-SRS; Milica Đurđević Stamenkovski-Serbian Party Oathkeepers-OATHKEEPERS; Miloš Vučević-Serbian Progressive Party-SNS)	2,219	35.50	10
Citizens' Group: Movement for the Salvation of Svrljig	698	11.17	3
Serbia Against Violence–Svrljig (Democratic Party)	252	4.03	1
"We – Power of the People, Prof. Branimir Nestorović–Svrljig"	204	3.26	1
New DSS for a Better Serbia	78	1.25	–
Roma Unity Party	71	1.14	–
Roma Union of Serbia	15	0.24	–
Total	6,251	100.00	27
Valid votes	6,251	97.38	
Invalid/blank votes	168	2.62	
Total votes	6,419	100.00	
Registered voters/turnout	10,179	63.06	

Six of the ten candidates elected on the Svrljig Tomorrow list were endorsed by the Serbian Progressive Party, two were endorsed by the Serbian Party Oathkeepers, and one each was endorsed by the PUPS and the Socialist Party of Serbia.

Incumbent mayor Miroslav Marković of the United Peasant Party was confirmed for a new term in office on 30 June 2024. As in the previous mandate, his deputy was chosen from the ranks of the Progressives.

==== Pirot District (Pirot, Babušnica, Bela Palanka, Dimitrovgrad) ====
There were no local elections held in the Pirot District in 2024. The last elections in Pirot, Babušnica, Bela Palanka, and Dimitrovgrad were held in 2023.

==== Podunavlje District (Smederevo, Smederevska Palanka, Velika Plana) ====
There were no local elections held in the Podunavlje District in 2024. The last election in Smederevska Palanka was held in 2022, and the last elections in Smederevo and Velika Plana were held in 2023.
