= People's Serbia =

Political coalition in Serbia

People's Serbia Народна Србија
- Abbreviation: NS
- Founded: 28 August 2026
- Ideology: Conservatism
- Political position: Centre-right
- Slogan: "The Choice of the People"; (Izbor naroda)
- National Assembly: 0 / 250

People's Serbia (Serbian: Народна Србија, romanized: Narodna Srbija; abbr. NS) is a political coalition that consists of three political parties in Serbia, the People's Movement of Serbia (NPS), New Face of Serbia (NLS), and Ecological Uprising (EU). Initially, the coalition wanted to take part in the 2026 Serbian parliamentary election, but it withdrew and announced its support for the Student List in September.

== History ==
People's Serbia was founded on 28 August 2026 by three political parties in Serbia, the People's Movement of Serbia (NPS), New Face of Serbia (NLS), and Ecological Uprising (EU). On 10 September, they announced their participation in the 2026 Serbian parliamentary election with a joint list named "Izbor naroda" ("The People's Choice").

The decision to run separately from the Student List was met with dissent within the member parties. Within days, the coalition began to break up. On 13 September, the entire NLS municipal board in Bajina Bašta, along with its local councillors, left the party, citing deep disagreement with the leadership's decisions and declaring full support for the Student List. The following day, the NLS municipal boards in Malo Crniće and Kostolac and the party's office in Kučevo also collectively left the party and announced they would back the Student List. Other local boards and members also left the respective parties. Snežana Rakić, a professor at the Faculty of Medicine in Belgrade, also withdrew her candidacy from the coalition's list, citing the lack of a united front between the opposition and the students.

Following the defections, the NLS presidency unanimously decided on 15 September, at the proposal of party president Miloš Parandilović, not to take part in the election and to support the Student List. The party announced it was leaving the coalition. Ecological Uprising followed shortly after. Later that day, at a press conference outside the Republic Electoral Commission (RIK), the coalition announced that it had submitted its list with 10,500 signatures but would withdraw from the election and endorse the Student List. NPS president Miroslav Aleksić said the decision was meant to contribute to a "referendum atmosphere". Since the signatures had already been filed, RIK proclaimed the list on 18 September, and the coalition formally requested its withdrawal on 22 September.

== Ideology and platform ==
The coalition opposes the rule of Aleksandar Vučić. It describes itself as opposed to corruption, while supporting economic reforms and environmental measures, as well as strengthening the national interests of Serbia. Đorđe Stanković from NPS said that the coalition also supports agricultural reforms.

== Members ==
Name	Leader	Seats before the election
People's Movement of Serbia (NPS)	Miroslav Aleksić	10 / 250
Ecological Uprising (EU)	Aleksandar Jovanović Ćuta	5 / 250
New Face of Serbia (NLS)	Miloš Parandilović	2 / 250
