= Ivana Parlić =

Serbian politician

- Ивана Парлић

Member of the National Assembly of the Republic of Serbia
- In office 1 August 2022 – 6 February 2024

Personal details
- Born: 1975 (age 50–51)
- Party: Narodna (until July 2024)

Ivana Parlić (Serbian Cyrillic: Ивана Парлић; born 1975) is a Serbian politician. She served in the Serbian national assembly from 2022 to 2024 as a member of the People's Party (Narodna).

She left the People's Party in July 2024.

== Early life and career ==
Parlić was born in Užice, in what was then the Socialist Republic of Serbia in the Socialist Federal Republic of Yugoslavia. She was raised in the city and graduated from the University of Belgrade Faculty of Law, after which she worked in the non-government sector and in television production. In 2008, she began working for Pošta Srbije.

== Politician ==
Parlić became president of the Užice city committee of the People's Party in 2020 and took part in the 2021–2022 Serbian environmental protests.

=== Parliamentarian ===
The People's Party participated in the 2022 Serbian parliamentary election as part of the United for the Victory of Serbia coalition. Parlić appeared in the thirtieth position on the coalition's electoral list and was elected to the national assembly when the list won thirty-eight seats. The Serbian Progressive Party (SNS) and its allies won the election, and the People's Party served in opposition. Parlić was a member of the environmental protection committee, a deputy member of the committee on the diaspora and Serbs in the region, a member of Serbia's delegation to the Parliamentary Assembly of the Mediterranean, and a member of the parliamentary friendship groups with Germany, Greece, Hungary, and Switzerland.

The People's Party experienced a serious split in August 2023, with several members joining the breakaway People's Movement of Serbia (NPS). Parlić remained with the People's Party and was a vocal critic of NPS leader Miroslav Aleksić.

The People's Party fielded its own electoral list in the 2023 Serbian parliamentary election, and Parlić appeared in the tenth position. The list did not cross the electoral threshold for assembly representation, and her term ended when the new parliament convened in February 2024.

=== Since February 2024 ===
The People's Party contested the 2024 Serbian local elections in Užice in an alliance with Dveri and the Movement for the Restoration of the Kingdom of Serbia (POKS). Parlić received the lead position on the alliance's list, which did not cross the electoral threshold.

She left in the People's Party in July 2024, in protest against its decision to co-operate with the governing Progressive Party.
