= Tatjana Marković Topalović =

Serbian academic and politician (born 1969)

- Татјана Марковић Топаловић

Member of the National Assembly of the Republic of Serbia
- Incumbent
- Assumed office 6 February 2024

Personal details
- Born: 24 March 1969 (age 57)
- Party: SRCE

Tatjana Marković Topalović (Serbian Cyrillic: Татјана Марковић Топаловић; born 24 March 1969) is a Serbian academic and politician. She has served in the National Assembly of Serbia since February 2024 as a member of Serbia Centre (SRCE).

== Early life and career ==
Marković Topalović was born in Požarevac, in what was then the Socialist Republic of Serbia in the Socialist Federal Republic of Yugoslavia. She graduated from high school in Šabac and later received a bachelor's degree from the University of Belgrade Faculty of Physics (1996), a master's degree from the University of Novi Sad's Department of Physics (2009), and a Ph.D. from the University of Belgrade Faculty of Physics (2022). Since 2004, she has taught at the "Dr. Andra Jovanović" medical school. She has published several expert papers in domestic and international journals. A highly respected teacher, Marković Topalović received a "Best Educators of Serbia" award in 2014 and was Serbia's representative at the competition for the Global Teacher Prize in 2019.

== Politician ==
Marković Topalović became president of Serbia Centre's city board for Šabac in June 2023. In October of the same year, she was chosen as a party vice-president.

=== Parliamentarian ===
Serbia Centre contested the 2023 Serbian parliamentary election as part of the Serbia Against Violence (SPN) coalition. Marković Topalović appeared in the twenty-sixth position on the SPN list and was elected when the list won sixty-five mandates. The Serbian Progressive Party (SNS) and its allies won a majority government, and she now serves in opposition with Serbia Centre's assembly group.

Marković Topalović is a member of the spatial planning committee (Note: Formally known as the Committee on Spatial Planning, Transport, Infrastructure, and Telecommunications.) and the environmental protection committee; a deputy member of the economy committee, (Note: Formally known as the Committee on the Economy, Regional Development, Trade, Tourism, and Energy.) the committee on the rights of the child, and the committee on human and minority rights and gender equality; and a substitute member of Serbia's delegation to the parliamentary dimension of the Central European Initiative.

=== City politics of Šabac ===
Marković Topalović sought to become the list holder for the local Šabac Against Violence coalition in the 2023 local elections, which took place concurrently with the parliamentary election. She was rejected in favour of former mayor Nebojša Zelenović, the leader of Serbia's Together (Zajedno) party. Due to ongoing divisions among Šabac's opposition parties, Serbia Centre ultimately left Šabac Against Violence and contested the local election on a separate list with the People's Movement of Serbia (NPS) and the New Face of Serbia (NLS). Marković Topalović appeared in the lead position and was elected to the city assembly when the list won two mandates.

The SNS and its allies won a majority victory in Šabac. Zelenović's coalition later announced a boycott of the assembly, charging that the election had been stolen. Serbia Centre opposes the boycott, and Marković Topalović has participated in the assembly as an opposition member. These events have led to further acrimony among the city's opposition parties and in particular between Marković Topalović and Zelenović.
