= Slavica Radovanović =

Serbian politician and retired police colonel

- Славица Радовановић

Member of the National Assembly
- Incumbent
- Assumed office 1 August 2022

Personal details
- Born: 1966 (age 59–60)
- Occupation: Politician

Slavica Radovanović (Serbian Cyrillic: Славица Радовановић; born 1966) is a Serbian politician and retired police colonel. She has been a member of the National Assembly since 1 August 2022. A former member of the People's Party (Narodna) and People's Movement of Serbia (NPS), she is now the co-leader of the coalition For Serbia.

== Biography ==
Radovanović was born in 1966. She holds a degree in special pedagogy.

She worked in the Ministry of Internal Affairs for 33 years in crime prevention and police training, first in the Police Directorate, Regional Administration for the City of Belgrade, and then in the Education Directorate of the Ministry of Internal Affairs.

Following her retirement, she started working in the Center for Missing and Abused Children.

=== Political career ===
She was a member of the People's Party (Narodna). In the 2022 general election, the People's Party contested as part of the United for the Victory of Serbia alliance and Radovanović was elected MP. Following the constitution of the National Assembly, Radovanović was sworn in as MP on 1 August 2022. Following a split in the People's Party in August 2023, Radovanović sided with Miroslav Aleksić and joined the People's Movement of Serbia (NPS). She left NPS in November 2024. The co-leader of the coalition For Serbia together with Vladimir Pavićević and Tamara Milenković Kerković.

She supports the introduction of the Amber alert system in Serbia.
