= Dijana Vukomanović =

Serbian politician

- Дијана Вукомановић
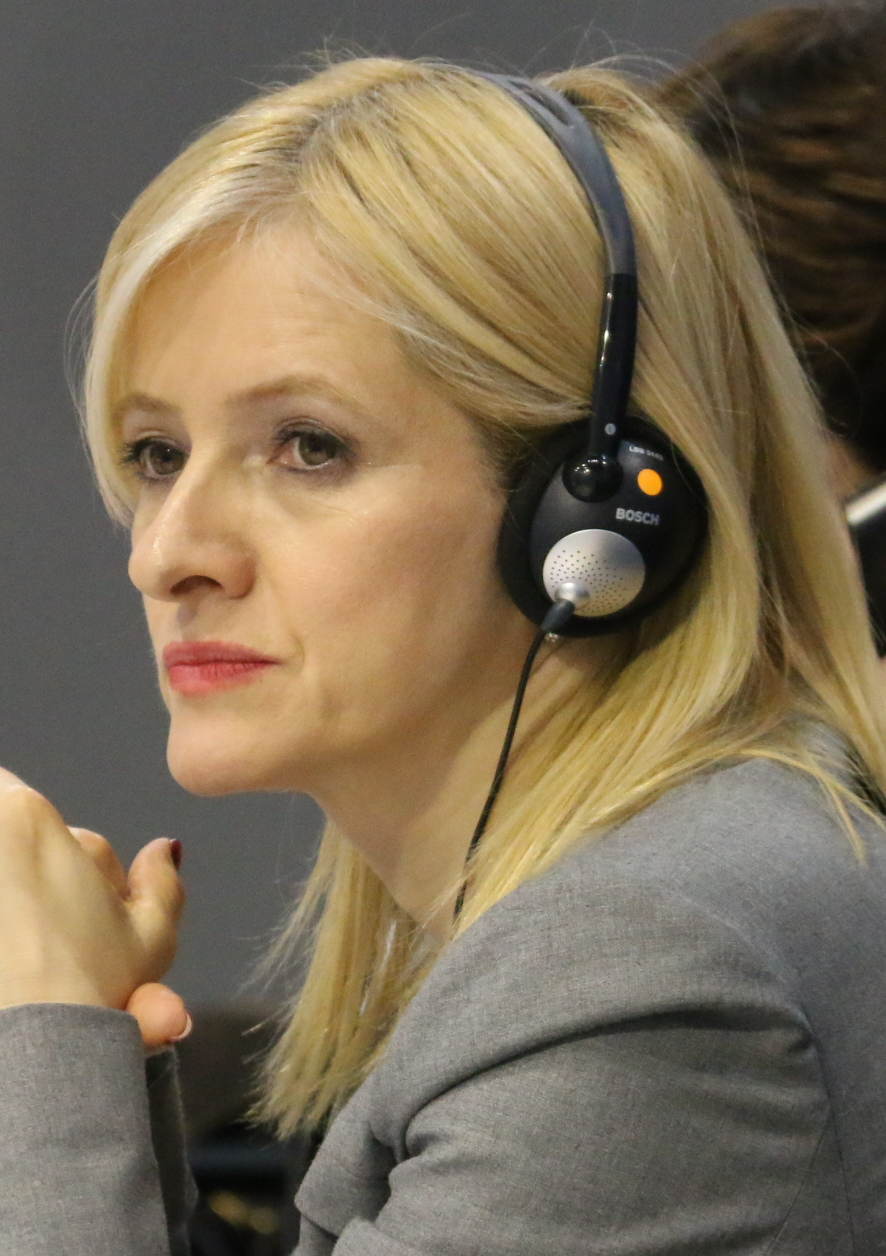
- Vukomanović in 2015

Member of the National Assembly of the Republic of Serbia
- In office 31 May 2012 – 3 August 2020

Member of the City Assembly of Belgrade
- In office 9 May 2018 – 11 June 2022

Personal details
- Born: 3 January 1967 (age 59) Virovitica, SR Croatia, SFR Yugoslavia
- Party: SPS (1996–?, 2010–16); Narodna (2017–22); SRCE (2022–present)
- Education: University of Belgrade, Central European University

Dijana Vukomanović (Serbian Cyrillic: Дијана Вукомановић; born 3 January 1967) is a Serbian political scientist and politician. She served in the Serbian parliament from 2012 to 2020, initially as a member of the Socialist Party of Serbia (SPS) and later with the People's Party (Narodna). She is now a member of Serbia Centre (SRCE).

== Early life and career ==
Vukomanović was born in Virovitica, in what was then the Socialist Republic of Croatia in the Socialist Federal Republic of Yugoslavia. She holds a bachelor's degree from the University of Belgrade Faculty of Political Sciences (1989), a master's degree from Central European University in Hungary (1995), and a Ph.D. from the University of Belgrade Faculty of Political Sciences (2009). She worked as a researcher at the University of Belgrade Institute of Social Sciences from 1992 until 2000, when she became a research associate at the Institute of Political Studies in Belgrade. She has published widely on topics such as nationalism and political transitions in post-communist countries and has been active with non-governmental organizations devoted to human rights, democracy, and local self-government.

== Politician ==
=== Socialist Party ===
==== Early years ====
Vukomanović joined the Socialist Party in October 1996, although she was not publicly associated with the party for several years thereafter. In 2010, she explained her initial decision to join the party as follows: "At that time the Socialists claimed to have 600,000 members. I doubted the authenticity of those claims and asked Milan Jovanović, a Socialist, whether that number could be verified. He told me the best way to check was to become an SPS member. I took his advice and signed up and I received a membership card with a serial number based on the number 600,000." Despite her membership in the SPS, she was an opponent of party leader Slobodan Milošević. In July 2001, she argued that Milošević's extradition to the International Criminal Tribunal for the former Yugoslavia (ICTY) would allow the SPS to become a modern pro-European party. Milošević died in ICTY custody in 2006, and the SPS later distanced itself from his legacy.

At the eighth Socialist Party congress in December 2010, Vukomanović co-authored a new platform that positioned the SPS as a centre-left party focused on European integration. She was elected as a party vice-president at the same congress. In accepting the position, she said, "My political orientation has always been leftist, which is why it was natural for me to be with the Socialists, because they are the most authentic party in Serbia." Referring to the SPS's place in Serbia's political culture, she said, "We are neither communist nor nationalists; we are socialists."

==== Parliamentarian ====
Vukomanović received the fifth position on the Socialist Party's electoral list in the 2012 Serbian parliamentary election and was elected when the list won forty-four mandates. During the campaign, she said that the party's top priorities would be "preserving existing jobs and enabling employment for young and qualified people." In the immediate aftermath of the election, she speculated on the continuation of Serbia's existing coalition government of the Democratic Party (DS) and the Socialists. Ultimately, however, the Socialists formed a new government with the Serbian Progressive Party (SNS). Vukomanović served as a government supporter in the assembly. She was a member of the committee for European integration and the committee for the diaspora and Serbs in the region, a member of Serbia's delegation to the Parliamentary Assembly of the Organization for Security and Co-operation in Europe (OSCE PA), the leader of Serbia's parliamentary friendship group with the United Kingdom, and a member of the friendship group with Montenegro. She was a prominent SPS media spokesperson in this period.

In October 2012, Serbian president Tomislav Nikolić said that Serbia would abandon its plans to join the European Union (EU) if it was required to recognize the independence of Kosovo as a condition of membership. Responding to this statement, Vukomanović said, "We must be prepared both for the best-case scenario, which is to have both Kosovo and EU integration, and for the worst-case scenario, which is to lose both." She added that, in the event of Serbia receiving an ultimatum on Kosovo, the question of continuing on a path to EU membership should be decided via a referendum.

Vukomanović again received the fifth position on the Socialist Party's list in the 2014 Serbian parliamentary election and was re-elected when the list again won forty-four mandates. The Progressive Party and its allies won a majority victory, and the SNS afterward formed a new coalition government with the Socialists and other parties. Vukomanović became the leader of the SPS assembly group; she was also deputy chair of the foreign affairs committee, a member of the education committee, (Note: Formally known as the Committee on Education, Science, Technological Development, and the Information Society.) a deputy member of the committee for European integration, the leader of Serbia's delegation to the OSCE PA, and a member of the friendship groups with Japan, Montenegro, and the United Kingdom. At a 2014 OSCE meeting in Croatia, she spoke of the shared historical, cultural, and economic ties binding all countries in south-eastern Europe and urged other countries to follow the example of Slovenia and Croatia in joining the European Union.

After Syriza won a historic victory in the January 2015 Greek legislative election, Vukomanović dismissed suggestions that the Socialist Party would shift its economic program further to the left. She noted that the SPS was aligned with the rival Panhellenic Socialist Movement (PASOK) in Greece and described Syriza as an "ultra-leftist" organization.

Vukomanović's term as an SPS vice-president came to an end in September 2015, and she became chair of the party's executive committee. She received the sixth position on the Socialist Party's electoral list for the 2016 parliamentary election and was elected for a third term when the list won twenty-nine mandates. The Progressives won another majority victory, and the SPS continued as part of the country's coalition government. There were rumours that Vukomanović would be appointed to a cabinet position, though ultimately this did not occur. She continued to lead the SPS's assembly group and was the leader of Serbia's delegation to the OSCE PA, a member of the foreign affairs committee, and a deputy member of the European Union–Serbia stabilization and association committee.

Vukomanović left the Socialist Party in October 2016. She did not provide a reason for her departure, though media reports noted that she had been reprimanded for a public quarrel with party official Ivana Petrović. After leaving the party, she lost her committee roles and her position in the OSCE PA.

In early 2017, Vukomanović said that the Socialist Party had lost its identity and had become a vassal of Progressive Party leader Aleksandar Vučić.

=== People's Party ===
==== Parliamentarian ====
Vukomanović joined an opposition parliamentary group called New Serbia–Movement for Serbia's Salvation in February 2017, serving with members of New Serbia (NS) and former members of the Democratic Party of Serbia (DSS). She was a prominent supporter of Vuk Jeremić's candidacy in the 2017 Serbian presidential election and joined Jeremić's People's Party at its founding convention in October 2017. She became a member of Narodna's presidency and was the president of its women's forum. In parliament, she was a member of the friendship groups with Germany, Montenegro, and the United Kingdom.

The People's Party began boycotting the national assembly in early 2019, against the backdrop of significant public protests against Serbia's SNS-led government. It subsequently boycotted the 2020 Serbian parliamentary election, and Vukomanović's parliamentary tenure came to an end in that year.

==== City politics in Belgrade ====
The People's Party contested the 2018 Belgrade city assembly election on a coalition electoral list led by former mayor Dragan Đilas. Vukomanović received the thirteenth position on the list and was elected when the alliance won twenty-six seats. The Progressive Party and its allies won a majority victory, and the People's Party served in opposition. Vukomanović was deputy leader of the People's Party group in the city assembly. She was not a candidate in the 2022 city election.

=== Serbia Centre ===
Vukomanović left the People's Party after the 2022 Serbian parliamentary election, in which she was not candidate, and joined the newly formed Serbia Centre party. In a July 2022 interview, she said that her decision was ideological: the People's Party had by this time positioned itself as a party of a right, whereas Serbia Centre was pro-European party with a centre-left orientation on social issues.

She was elected as a vice-president of Serbia Centre in December 2022.
