= Stefan Jovanović =

Stefan Jovanović may refer to:

- Stefan Jovanović (footballer)
- Stefan Jovanović (politician)
