= Duško Lopandić =

Serbian politician, university professor, writer and former diplomat

- Душко Лопандић
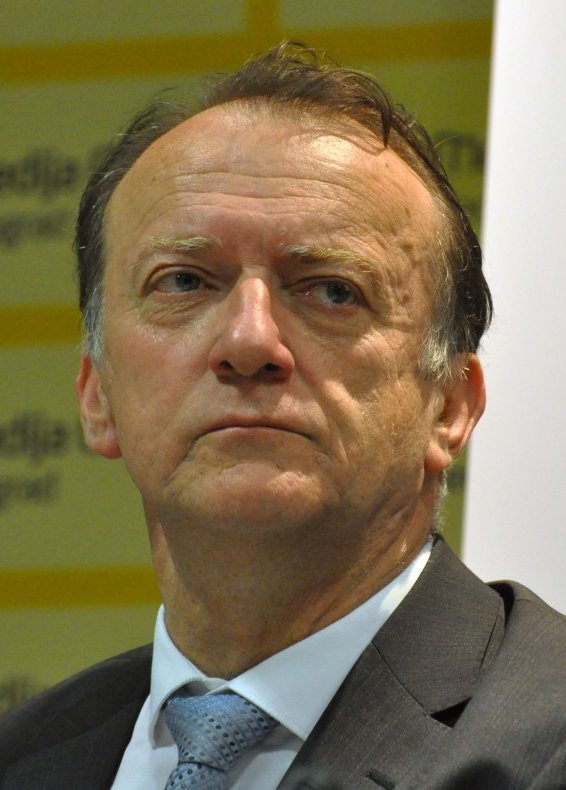
- Lopandić in 2018

Ambassador of Serbia to the European Union
- In office 13 May 2013 – 21 June 2016
- President: Tomislav Nikolić
- Preceded by: Roksanda Ninčić
- Succeeded by: Ana Hrustanović

Assistant to the Minister of Foreign Affairs
- In office 22 August 2011 – 2013
- Minister: Vuk Jeremić; Ivan Mrkić

Ambassador of Serbia to Portugal
- In office 15 June 2007 – 6 June 2011
- President: Boris Tadić
- Preceded by: Dušan Kovačević
- Succeeded by: Mirko Stefanović

Assistant to the Minister of International Economic Relations
- In office 2004–2007
- Minister: Predrag Bubalo; Milan Parivodić

Personal details
- Born: 1957 (age 68–69)
- Party: Serbia Centre (2022–present)
- Education: University of Belgrade Faculty of Law; Paris 1 Panthéon-Sorbonne University
- Occupation: Diplomat, politician, professor, writer

Duško Lopandić (Serbian: Душко Лопандић; born 1957) is a Serbian politician, university professor, writer and former diplomat. A career diplomat from 1986, he served as ambassador of Serbia to Portugal from 2007 to 2011 and to the European Union from 2013 to 2016. He was a vice-president of the centrist Serbia Centre (SRCE) from 2022 until October 2026, when he resigned from all his party functions after the 2026 parliamentary election.

== Education ==
Lopandić graduated from the University of Belgrade Faculty of Law and obtained his master's degree and doctorate in European law at Paris 1 Panthéon-Sorbonne University.

== Diplomatic career ==
Lopandić joined the Ministry of Foreign Affairs of Yugoslavia in 1986 and worked at the Yugoslav mission in Brussels from 1988 to 1994. After the overthrow of Slobodan Milošević, he headed the European Union directorate of the foreign ministry of FR Yugoslavia (later Serbia and Montenegro) from 2001 to 2004. From 2004 to 2007, he was assistant to the minister of international economic relations for multilateral affairs. He served as ambassador of Serbia to Portugal and Cape Verde from 2007 to 2011, and as assistant to the minister of foreign affairs for the European Union and regional cooperation from 2011 to 2013.

From 2013, Lopandić was the head of Serbia's mission to the European Union. In June 2016, the government recalled him, citing his failure to act regarding an exhibition on the Croatian cardinal Aloysius Stepinac in the European Parliament; he was replaced by Ana Hrustanović, until then ambassador in Rome. Lopandić said that he had been dismissed outside the regular procedure, to free up the post for others, while those with real responsibility had kept their positions. Tomislav Nikolić, then the president of Serbia, said that Lopandić had erred by not informing the foreign ministry about the exhibition. Until his retirement in 2022, he headed the foreign ministry's department for analysis and foreign policy planning.

== Academic career and writing ==
Lopandić has worked with a number of research institutes and has published over 100 academic works on the European Union, diplomatic history, regional cooperation and international relations. He has also written history books and school textbooks. He is a professor of public international law and European law at the Faculty of Justice and Economics in Novi Sad.

== Political career ==
In July 2022, Lopandić joined Zdravko Ponoš's newly founded Serbia Centre, and was elected its vice-president in December 2022; he was re-elected in October 2025.

Ahead of the 2026 parliamentary election, SRCE decided to run on the "European Serbia" list with the Party of Freedom and Justice rather than withdraw in favour of the Student List. Lopandić refused to be a candidate on the list, which won about 0.3% of the vote and failed to cross the electoral threshold. On 27 October 2026, he resigned from all his functions in the party, saying that he, part of the leadership and many members had argued from the start for withdrawing from the campaign because of its referendum character. He also accused the party leadership of avoiding responsibility for the defeat and of expelling Slobodan Petrović, an MP who had supported the Student List.

== Other activities ==
Lopandić is a long-time activist and former vice-president of the European Movement in Serbia, which gave him its Contribution of the Year to Europe award in 2003.

== Selected works ==
- La communauté économique européenne et la Yougoslavie: commerce et coopération dans les accords entre la communauté économique européenne et la Yougoslavie
- Letopis velikih župana
- Purpur imperije
- Likovi i priče iz srpskog srednjeg veka
- Dinastije koje su vladale Evropom
- Poslužili svome dragom otečestvu – iz diplomatske istorije Srbije 1914–1918
- Regionalne inicijative u Jugoistočnoj Evropi
- Reči su senke dela
- Evropska integracija između nacije i globalizacije
- Vreme sjaja, vreme tame: diplomate u vrtlogu istorije od XIII veka do 1941. godine
- Bitke za Balkan
