= Miloš Parandilović =

Serbian politician

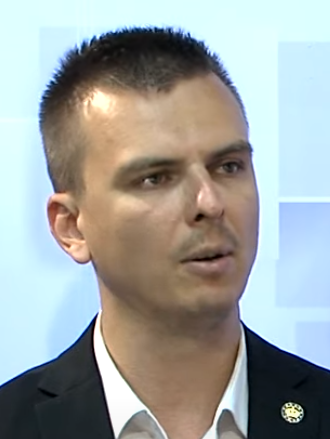
- Parandilović in 2020

Member of the National Assembly
- Incumbent
- Assumed office 1 August 2022

Personal details
- Born: 26 March 1989 (age 37) Priboj, SR Serbia, SFR Yugoslavia
- Party: SPO (2007–2017); POKS (2017–2022); NLS (2022–present)
- Education: Higher Business and Technical in Užice

Miloš Parandilović (Serbian Cyrillic: Милош Парандиловић; born 26 March 1989) is a Serbian politician. He was elected to the National Assembly of Serbia in the 2022 Serbian parliamentary election as a candidate of the Movement for the Restoration of the Kingdom of Serbia (POKS). He is now the leader of the New Face of Serbia (NLS).

== Early life and private career ==
Parandilović was born in Priboj, in what was then the Socialist Republic of Serbia in the Socialist Federal Republic of Yugoslavia. He was raised in the community and attended business and technical college in nearby Užice. He is a specialist professional civil engineer.

== Politician ==
=== Municipal politics ===
Parandilović joined the Serbian Renewal Movement (SPO) in 2007. This party contested the 2012 Serbian local elections in Priboj on the electoral list of the Democratic Party (DS), and Parandilović was included on the list in the twentieth position. The list won five seats, and he was not immediately elected. He was, however, awarded a mandate on 7 June 2013 as the replacement for another party member. He initially served in a parliamentary group with the DS but later joined the group of the Serbian Progressive Party (SNS).

The SPO ran on the SNS's coalition list the 2016 local elections in Priboj. Parandilović received the thirty-fifth position on the list and was not re-elected when it won a narrow majority victory with twenty-two out of forty-one seats.

In 2017, a group of SPO members opposed to Vuk Drašković's continued leadership left the party and founded the POKS. Parandilović joined the new party and later appeared in the fourth position on its list in the 2018 Belgrade City Assembly election. The list did not cross the electoral threshold to win representation in the assembly.

Parandilović was given the tenth position on the POKS's For the Kingdom of Serbia list in the 2020 Serbian parliamentary election. This list also fell below the electoral threshold. His name appeared on the POKS's list in Priboj in the concurrent 2020 local elections, although he was not himself a candidate.

=== 2021 POKS split ===
On 23 December 2021, it was reported that the POKS presidency had met to remove party leader Žika Gojković from office, on the grounds that his four-year term had expired in October. It was further reported that the presidency had dissolved the Belgrade board of the party for "inactivity" and appointed Vojislav Mihailović as commissioner.

Parandilović refuted the claim that Gojković had been removed as leader, saying that the aforementioned meeting of the presidency had been illegitimately convened by a group of party officials seeking to carry out a coup. He added that, according to the party's constitution, meetings of the presidency can only be convened by the president or vice-president, rather than what he described as "a private group that deceives the public and makes decisions that are legally and morally invalid."

The party subsequently became divided into rival groups, respectively led by Gojković and Mihailović, each claiming to be the only legitimate party associstion. Parandilović emerged as a prominent member of Gojković's group.

=== Election to the National Assembly ===
Gojković's POKS won the right to use the party name in the 2022 Serbian parliamentary election, which the party contested in an alliance with Dveri. Parandilović was chosen as the bearer of their combined list and was given the seventh list position. At the press conference during the election, he said that the alliance's first priority was the re-establishment of a kingdom, saying that power had become consolidated around a single leader in the republican system. He also called for what he described as "economic patriotism." He was elected when the Dveri–POKS list won ten mandates and was sworn in as MP on 1 August 2022.

In December 2022, Parandilović formed the New Face of Serbia (NLS) organization. In August 2023, Parandilović joined the newly-formed People's Movement of Serbia – New Face of Serbia parliamentary group and was appointed its deputy president, with Miroslav Aleksić being the president.
