= Tamara Milenković Kerković =

Serbian politician

- Тамара Миленковић Керковић
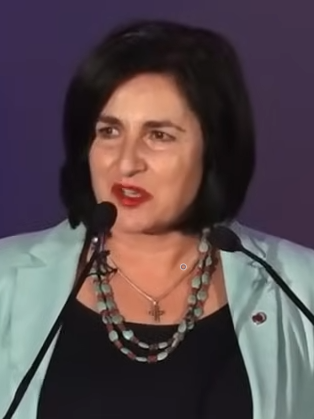
- Milenković Kerković in 2023

Member of the National Assembly of the Republic of Serbia
- In office 1 August 2022 – 6 February 2024

Personal details
- Born: 28 January 1965 (age 61) Niš, SR Serbia, SFR Yugoslavia
- Party: Dveri (until 2024)

Tamara Milenković Kerković (Serbian Cyrillic: Тамара Миленковић Керковић; born 28 January 1965) is a Serbian lawyer, academic, and politician. She served in the Serbian national assembly from 2022 to 2024 and is now a member of the Niš city assembly. Formerly a prominent member of Dveri, Milenković Kerković left the party in September 2024.

She has been described as a conservative environmentalist.

== Early life and career ==
Milenković Kerković was born in Niš, in what was then the Socialist Republic of Serbia in the Socialist Federal Republic of Yugoslavia. She holds a bachelor's degree from the University of Niš Faculty of Law (1990) and a master's degree (1996) and Ph.D. (2003) from the University of Belgrade Faculty of Law. Milenković Kerković began working at the University of Niš Faculty of Economics in 1992 and became a full professor in the field of commercial law in 2014. She has published widely in her field.

== Politician ==
Milenković Kerković joined the right-wing Dveri party in 2016. Before this time, she was not a member of any political party. She became one of Dveri's vice-presidents and the leader of its city board in Niš.

=== Parliamentarian ===
Dveri contested the 2022 Serbian parliamentary election in an alliance with Žika Gojković's branch of the Movement for the Restoration of the Kingdom of Serbia (POKS). Milenković Kerković was given the fifth position on the combined electoral list of the parties and was elected when the alliance won ten mandates. The Serbian Progressive Party (SNS) and its allies won the election, and Dveri served in opposition.

During her parliamentary term, Milenković Kerković was a member of the labour committee (Note: Formally known as the Committee on Labour, Social Issues, Social Inclusion, and Poverty Reduction.) and the culture and information committee, a deputy member of Serbia's delegation to the South-East European Cooperation Process parliamentary assembly, the leader of Serbia's parliamentary friendship group with Sri Lanka, and a member of its friendship groups Armenia, Cyprus, Greece, India, Indonesia, Iran, Israel, Japan, Jordan, and Qatar.

In a March 2023 interview, Milenković Kerković said that the decision of western governments to recognize the Republic of Kosovo set a dangerous precedent that risked exacerbating national difficulties in Spain, Cyprus, and other European states with secessionist movements. In the same interview, she recounted Dveri's activities in opposing school textbooks that included what she described as "LGBT ideology" and "gender ideology."

Dveri contested the 2023 Serbian parliamentary election in an alliance with the far-right Serbian Party Oathkeepers (SSZ). Milenković Kerković appeared in the eighth position on their combined list, which did not cross the electoral threshold for assembly representation. She resigned from all positions in Dveri after the election. Her parliamentary term ended when the new assembly convened in February 2024.

=== Local politics in Niš ===
Milenković Kerković called for all opposition parties in Niš to unite on a single electoral list for the 2024 Serbian local elections. While this did not happen, several opposition parties came together to form the We Choose Niš alliance. Dveri was not officially part of the alliance, but Milenković Kerković received the second position on its list, and another Dveri representative named Andrej Mitić was given the tenth position. Formally, both candidates were endorsed by the People's Movement of Serbia (NPS).

The 2024 city assembly results in Niš were extremely contentious: the SNS alliance and the Russian Party won a combined one-seat majority, and the opposition parties charged electoral fraud. This notwithstanding, the SNS's victory was certified by the city authorities, and the party formed a new coalition government afterward. The We Choose Niš alliance won ten seats, and both Milenković Kerković and Mitić were elected as opposition members.

Milenković Kerković left Dveri in September 2024, as did Mitić. They issued a joint statement announcing their decision, saying they disagreed with the direction of Dveri's incoming party leadership but would continue to promote principles of national democracy, direct democracy, and what they described as "green patriotism."

She criticized the Serbian government's proposed changes to the Law on Higher Education in November 2024, arguing that they would permit "franchises of foreign universities" to run unaccredited study programs in Serbia. She said that the SNS-led government's policies had already led to a proliferation of dubious academic institutions and a general erosion of academic standards.

Milenković Kerković called for greater protection of Niš's heritage sites in December 2024, arguing that the city's centre was losing its identity due to years of urbanistic violence and neglect.
