= Aleksandar Radojević (politician) =

Serbian politician

Aleksandar Radojević (Serbian Cyrillic: Александар Радојевић; born 21 May 1965) is a medical doctor and politician in Serbia. He served in the National Assembly of Serbia from 2012 to 2016, initially as a member of the Serbian Progressive Party (Srpska napredna stranka, SNS) and later as an independent. He is now a member of the People's Party (Narodna stranka, NS).

== Early life and career ==
Radojević was born in the village of Preljina in Čačak, in what was then the Socialist Republic of Serbia in the Socialist Federal Republic of Yugoslavia. He is a pneumatic physiologist.

He resigned from the Čačak General Hospital in 2019 after twenty-five years, citing poor working conditions over an extended period of time.

== Parliament ==
Radojević was given the 74th position on the Progressive Party's Let's Get Serbia Moving electoral list in the 2012 Serbian parliamentary election and narrowly missed direct election when the list won seventy-three mandates. He was awarded a seat on 25 June 2012 as the replacement for another party member. The SNS formed a coalition government with the Socialist Party of Serbia (Socijalistička partija Srbije, SPS), and Radojević served as a supporter of the administration. In his first term, he was a member of the committee on labour, social issues, social inclusion, and poverty reduction; a deputy member of the committee on education, science, technological development, and the information society; a deputy member of the health and family committee; and a member of the parliamentary friendship groups with Azerbaijan, China, Greece, Iraq, Macedonia, Russia, Slovakia, Sweden, and the United States of America.

He appeared in the 104th position on the SNS's list in the 2014 parliamentary election and was re-elected when the list won a landslide victory with 158 out of 250 seats. He was a member of the health and family committee and a deputy member of the environmental protection committee in his second term, as well serving on the friendship groups for Algeria, Azerbaijan, Belarus, the Czech Republic, Indonesia, Iraq, Kazakhstan, Russia, Slovakia, Sweden, Turkmenistan, the United Arab Emirates, the United Kingdom, the United States of America, and Venezuela. He was briefly a member of Serbia's delegation to the Inter-Parliamentary Union assembly and later served in its delegation to the NATO Parliamentary Assembly (where Serbia has observer status). He was not a candidate in the 2016 parliamentary election.

== Local politics ==
Radojević led the SNS's list for Čačak in the 2012 local elections and was elected when the list won thirteen seats. New Serbia (Nova Srbija, NS) won the election; The SNS served in opposition, and Radojević led its group in the city assembly.

He left the SNS in early March 2016, charging that a figure from New Serbia had taken over the party's local branch in Čačak, and established an independent political movement called For a More Progressive Čačak. He led the movement's list in the 2016 local elections and was re-elected to the city assembly when it won six seats. He again served in opposition.

In June 2019, Radojević became president of the city board of the People's Party in Čačak. The party boycotted the 2020 Serbian local elections, and his term in the assembly came to an end that year.
