= New Face of Serbia =

Political party in Serbia

New Face of Serbia Ново лице Србије
- Abbreviation: NLS
- President: Miloš Parandilović
- Vice-President: Ivan Matović
- Founder: Miloš Parandilović
- Founded: 26 September 2022
- Registered: 1 August 2023
- Split from: Movement for the Restoration of the Kingdom of Serbia
- Preceded by: Conservative Reformist Party
- Headquarters: Bulevar despota Stefana 80, Belgrade
- Ideology: Conservatism; Monarchism
- Political position: Centre-right
- Colours: Blue
- Slogan: "Srbija zaslužuje bolje!"; ("Serbia deserves better!")
- National Assembly: 0 / 250
- Assembly of Vojvodina: 0 / 120
- City Assembly of Belgrade: 1 / 110

Website
- novolicesrbije.rs

The New Face of Serbia (Serbian: Ново лице Србије, romanised: Novo lice Srbije, abbr. NLS) is a political party in Serbia. Miloš Parandilović has served as its president since its formation in September 2022.

Parandilović was previously a member of the Movement for the Restoration of the Kingdom of Serbia. Following Žika Gojković's decision to side with the then-ruling Serbian Progressive Party, Parandilović disassociated with Gojković and formed NLS. After the Belgrade school shooting and the Mladenovac and Smederevo shootings in May 2023, NLS was one of the organisers of the mass anti-government protests. In the 2023 parliamentary election, it was part of the Serbia Against Violence alliance and won 2 seats in the National Assembly of Serbia. In 2026, it withdrew from the parliamentary election in favour of the Student List. NLS is a self-described centre-right, conservative, and monarchist party.

== History ==
=== Background and formation ===
Miloš Parandilović was previously affiliated with the Movement for the Restoration of the Kingdom of Serbia (POKS), joining POKS once it split from the Serbian Renewal Movement in 2017. He was a candidate in the 2020 parliamentary election, however, POKS failed to cross the 3% electoral threshold. POKS had a leadership dispute, that began in December 2021, and Parandilović sided with Žika Gojković, who declined to leave the position of the president of POKS. Parandilović was later featured on a Dveri–POKS list in the 2022 parliamentary election and was successfully elected to the National Assembly of Serbia.

Following Gojković's decision to vote in favour of Vladimir Orlić, a member of the Serbian Progressive Party (SNS), becoming the president of the National Assembly of Serbia, Parandilović became critical of Gojković, ultimately leaving Gojković's faction of members of the National Assembly formerly affiliated with POKS.

Parandilović announced the formation of a new movement on 23 September 2022 and presented it inside the National Assembly on 26 September as New Face of Serbia (NLS). At the press conference on 26 September, he announced that NLS had members formerly affiliated with POKS, but also members of citizens' associations. Following the formation of NLS, POKS members of local boards in Jagodina, Valjevo, Ub, Lajkovac, and Bogatić defected to NLS.

=== 2022–present ===
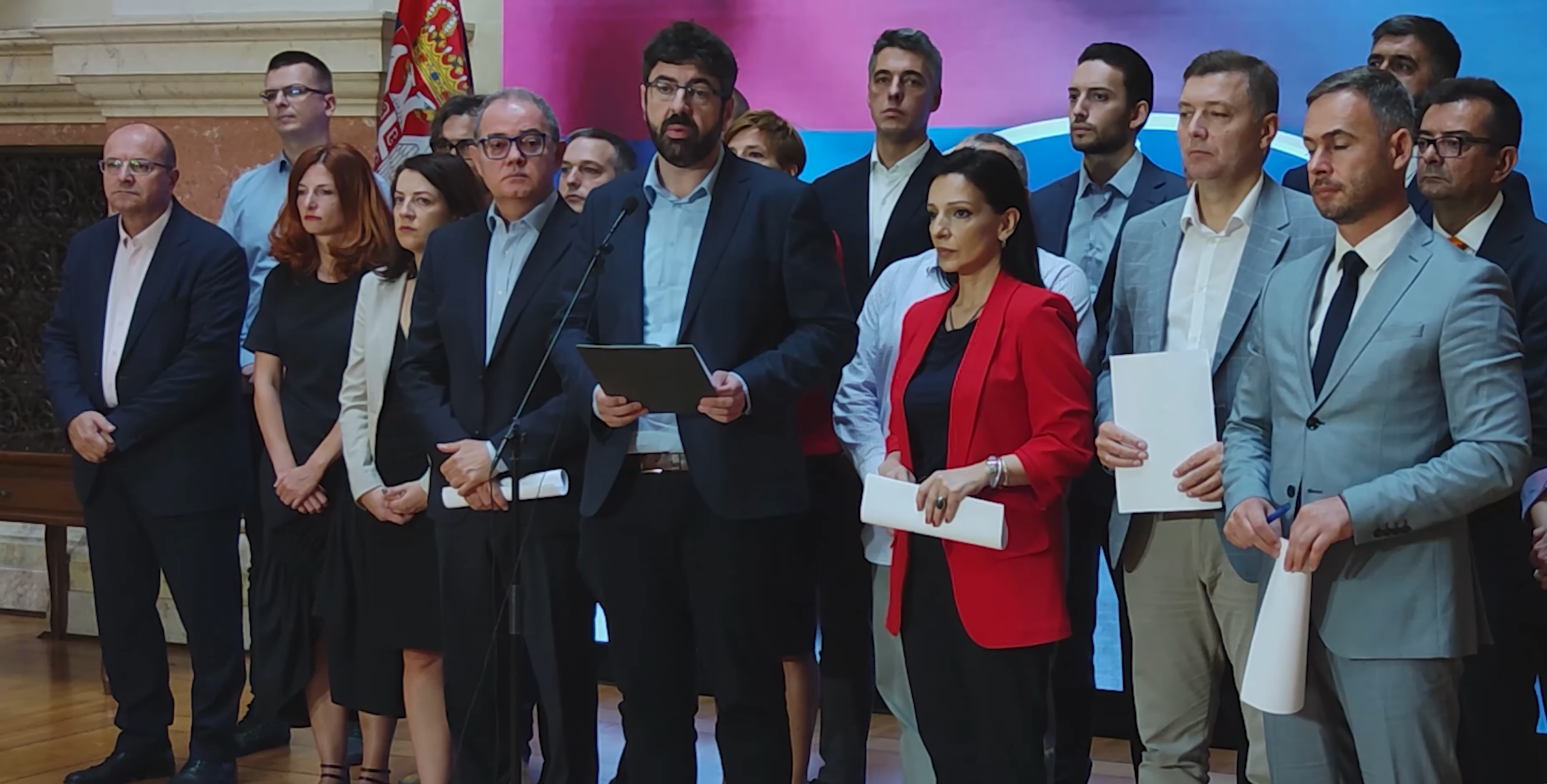
NLS (Parandilović on the far-left) was one of the signatories of the Agreement for Victory in September 2023

Following the Belgrade school shooting and the Mladenovac and Smederevo shootings in May 2023, NLS and Parandilović have taken part in the Serbia Against Violence protests. In June 2023, NLS formed a local board in Valjevo.

After Miroslav Aleksić left the People's Party and reconstituted the People's Movement of Serbia (NPS) in August 2023, Parandilović joined the four NPS members in the National Assembly to create a joint parliamentary group titled "People's Movement of Serbia–New Face of Serbia"; Parandilović became deputy chair of the parliamentary group. The group was expanded in September 2023, when three Ecological Uprising members, led by Aleksandar Jovanović Ćuta joined the parliamentary group, renaming it to "People's Movement of Serbia–Ecological Uprising–New Face of Serbia".

Parandilović participated at the signatory of the Agreement for Victory document in September 2023, which was signed by the organisers of the Serbia Against Violence protests. In the same month, association "Natives" merged into NLS. NLS became part of the Serbia Against Violence (SPN) coalition in October 2023, a coalition of political parties organising the 2023 protests. SPN announced that it would contest the parliamentary, Vojvodina provincial, and Belgrade City Assembly elections, all scheduled for 17 December 2023. In the parliamentary election, SPN won 65 seats, 2 of which went to NLS.

Ahead of the 2026 Serbian parliamentary election, NLS formed the "People's Serbia" (Narodna Srbija) coalition with the People's Movement of Serbia (NPS) and Ecological Uprising (EU). On 15 September 2026, the coalition announced that it would not field candidates and would instead back the Student List; out of respect for the activists who had collected them, it submitted the signatures gathered for its list, which was proclaimed and then withdrawn. The NLS presidency had unanimously voted against taking part in the election on 14 September, reportedly on Parandilović's initiative, although the coalition had already gathered enough signatures. The election, held on 25 October 2026, was won by the Student List with 140 of the 250 seats.

== Ideology and platform ==
NLS was in opposition to SNS until the SNS lost power in the 2026 election. It is a self-described conservative and centre-right political party. Parandilović, a self-described monarchist, has declared that NLS would too support the restoration of the monarchy, but that it would also support youth rights. NLS members and Parandilović were present at a commemoration of youth members of the Chetnik Student Battalion who died in 1944 near Bijeljina. NLS has declared its support for Serbian farmers. NLS opposes the proposed Ohrid Agreement but it supports holding a referendum on the matter. Parandilović has criticised Russophilia present amongst right-wing parties in Serbia and has cited Konrad Adenauer and Charles de Gaulle as role models.

== Organisation ==
Parandilović has led NLS since its formation in September 2022. NLS elected him as president on 12 November, alongside vice-president Ivan Matović. Its slogan is "Serbia deserves better". Its headquarters is at Bulevar despota Stefana 80 in Belgrade. NLS and the Reformist Party (RS) came to an agreement on 1 August 2023 to reconstitute RS as NLS in the registry of political parties, thus NLS skipped the collection of 10,000 signatures to become a registered political party. Aleksandar Višnjić, the president of RS, was announced as one of the vice-presidents of NLS. NLS held its first assembly on 12 November at which the party adopted its programme, statute, and slogan.

=== List of presidents ===
#	President	Birth–Death	Term start	Term end
1	Miloš Parandilović	1989–	26 September 2022	Incumbent

== Electoral performance ==
=== Parliamentary elections ===
National Assembly of Serbia
Year	Leader	Popular vote	% of popular vote	#	# of seats	Seat change	Coalition	Status	Ref.
2023	Miloš Parandilović	902,450	24.32%	▲2nd	2 / 250	▲1	SPN	Opposition	
2026	Miloš Parandilović	Did not participate			0 / 250	▼2	Supported SL	Extra-parliamentary	

=== Provincial elections ===
Assembly of Vojvodina
Year	Leader	Popular vote	% of popular vote	#	# of seats	Seat change	Coalition	Status	Ref
2023	Miloš Parandilović	215,197	22.55%	▲2nd	0 / 120	0	SPN	Extra-parliamentary	

=== Belgrade City Assembly elections ===
City Assembly of Belgrade
Year	Leader	Popular vote	% of popular vote	#	# of seats	Seat change	Coalition	Status	Ref.
2023	Miloš Parandilović	325,429	35.39%	▲2nd	1 / 110	0	SPN	Snap election	
2024	Miloš Parandilović	89,430	12.42%	▼3rd	1 / 110	0	BB	Opposition	
