= Miloje Miletić =

- Милоје Милетић
- General Miloje Miletić in 2011
- Born: 20 June 1953 (age 73); Blace, FPR Yugoslavia
- Military career
- Allegiance: Serbia
- Branch: Serbian Armed Forces; Serbian Army
- Service years: 1976–2011
- Rank: General
- Conflicts: Kosovo War; NATO Bombing of Yugoslavia

Miloje Miletić (Serbian Cyrillic: Милоје Милетић, born 1953) is the former Chief of the General Staff of the Serbian Armed Forces, appointed 15 February 2009. Before that, he served as acting Deputy Chief of the General Staff. He retired from active service on 12 December 2011.

== Education ==
- School of National Defence, 2000
- Staff Command College, 1995
- Military Academy, Artillery, 1976

== Commands held ==
- Deputy Chief of SAF GS
- Chief of the Development Department(Ј-5), SAF GS
- Chief of the Training Department (Ј-7), SAF GS
- Chief of the Artillery Department, Field Army Sector, SAF GS
- Deputy Chief of the Artillery Department, Army Sector, SAF GS
- Chief of the Artillery Department, Field Army Sector, SAF GS
- Command posts ranging from the platoon commander to the commanding officer of motorized and artillery brigade

== Personal life ==
Miletić is married and has two children.

Military offices
Preceded by Zdravko Ponoš	Chief of the General Staff of the Serbian Armed Forces; 15 February 2009 – 12 December 2011	Succeeded by Ljubiša Diković
