= Ivana Rokvić =

Serbian writer and politician

- Ивана Роквић

Member of the National Assembly of the Republic of Serbia
- Incumbent
- Assumed office 6 February 2024

Personal details
- Born: 1977 (age 48–49) Belgrade, SR Serbia, SFR Yugoslavia
- Party: NPS
- Education: University of Belgrade

Ivana Rokvić (Serbian Cyrillic: Ивана Роквић; born 1977) is a Serbian author and politician. She has served in the National Assembly of Serbia since February 2024 as a member of the People's Movement of Serbia (NPS).

== Early life and career ==
Rokvić was born in Belgrade, in what was then the Socialist Republic of Serbia in the Socialist Federal Republic of Yugoslavia. She graduated from the University of Belgrade Faculty of Political Sciences on the topic "Local Self-Government of the USA: Phoenix Case Study" and later completed international studies at the University of Pittsburgh, specializing in public administration management and local self-government.

Rokvić returned to Serbia in 2003 and worked as a project manager for the non-governmental organization PALGO. She later became director of the Serbian government's secretariat for international cooperation and was deputy secretary-general of the Serbian Association for Small and Medium Enterprises. She started a publishing agency in 2015 and has done research on recent Serbian history.

Her historical novel Zapisi crnog pera (English: Notes from a Black Pen) was published in 2019, and she later began work on a novel about the Jasenovac concentration camp.

== Politician ==
The People's Movement of Serbia participated in the 2023 Serbian parliamentary election as part of the Serbia Against Violence (SPN) coalition. Rokvić appeared in the sixteenth position on the coalition's electoral list and was elected when the list won sixty-five seats. The Serbian Progressive Party (SNS) and its allies won a majority victory, and the NPS serves in opposition. Rokvić is a member of the culture and information committee, a deputy member of the health and family committee and the environmental protection committee, and a member of Serbia's delegation to the assembly of the Inter-Parliamentary Union.

In the 2024 Serbian local elections, Rokvić appeared in the eighth position on the coalition "We Choose Belgrade" list in the election for the Belgrade city assembly and the third position on the "We Choose New Belgrade" list in the concurrent election for the New Belgrade municipal assembly. Unofficial results show her elected to both assemblies, with "We Choose Belgrade" winning fourteen seats and "We Choose New Belgrade" winning nine. The same results show the SNS and its allies winning majorities at both levels of government.
