= Ljubiša Diković =

Serbian military officer

- Љубиша Диковић
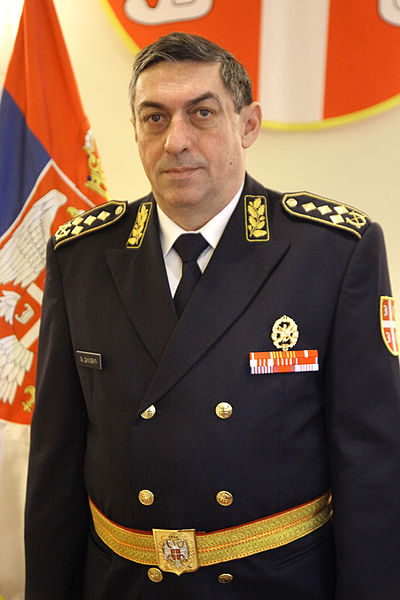
- General Ljubiša Diković in 2012
- Born: 22 May 1960 (age 66); Užice, SFR Yugoslavia
- Military career
- Allegiance: Serbia
- Branch: Serbian Army
- Service years: 1984–2018
- Rank: General
- Unit: Serbian General Staff
- Conflicts: Kosovo War; NATO bombing of Yugoslavia
- Awards: Order of Karađorđe Star

Ljubiša Diković (Serbian Cyrillic: Љубиша Диковић; born 22 May 1960) was the Chief of General Staff of the Serbian Armed Forces from 12 December 2011 to 14 September 2018. He previously served as Commander-in-Chief of the Serbian Land Forces.

== Military career ==
Diković was born in Užice, SFR Yugoslavia on 22 May 1960. He graduated from Military Academy of Land Forces in 1984. In 1989, he became Platoon Commander of Yugoslav People's Army and in 1991 he got promoted to Company Commander. Soon afterwards, in 1992 he moved to the position of Commander of 16th Border Battalion, where he stayed until 1996. In that same year he completed Army's Staff Command College.

From 1996 to 1998 Diković served as Chief of Staff of the 37th motorized brigade, which is part of 3rd Land Force Brigade of Serbian Land Forces only to become the Commander of that same brigade in 1998. He was holding that position until 2001 when he became Head of Army Department at Military Academy in Belgrade until 2003. Next two years he spent at Užice Army corps HQ, firstly as a Chief of Section and afterwards as the Chief of Staff. During 2005, he served as Deputy Chief of the Serbian General Staff and in 2006 as Deputy Chief of J-3, which represents Operations Directorate.

Between 2006 and 2007 General Diković held position of Chief of Staff of Joint Operations Command of Serbian General Staff. In 2007 he moved to the position of Commander at Serbian Training Command for the next two years before being promoted to the position of Commander in Chief of Serbian Land Forces in Niš. On 12 December 2011, Serbian President Boris Tadić appointed him to the position of the Chief of the General Staff of Serbian Armed Forces.

On 14 September 2018, he retired from the military service and Milan Mojsilović replaced him as the Chief of General Staff of the Serbian Armed Forces. He also became the recipient of the Order of Karađorđe's Star, Serbian highest civilian and military decoration.

== Alleged war crimes ==
After being appointed Chief of General Staff of Serbia in 2011, Belgrade-based NGO "Humanitarian Law Center" published two dossiers - "Ljubiša Diković" Dossier in 2012 and "Rudnica" Dossier in 2015. Both dossiers offer evidence that the unit that Diković commanded - 37th Motorized Brigade of the Yugoslav Army - committed war crimes against Albanian civilians in Kosovo during the Kosovo war. Both files offer excerpts of authentic military documents, including orders and combat reports signed by Ljubiša Diković.

"Ljubiša Diković" Dossier from 2012 describes seven crimes committed against Albanian civilians in Kosovo, including murder, rape and deportation, in the area of responsibility of the 37th Motorised Brigade, which resulted in the death of over 450 civilians.

In 2013 a mass grave was discovered Rudnica - in a village in southern Serbia, from which in 2014 52 bodies of Albanian civilians from Kosovo were exhumed. Based on the documentation, in particular the testimony of eyewitnesses, the Humanitarian Law Center was able to identify the circumstances of their death; while on the basis of the use of military and police records from the ICTY database managed to identify the unit that had been present at the time and place of the crime. "Rudnica" Dossier of 2015 provides insight into the evidence on four crimes committed in April and May 1999 in Kosovo, in the area of responsibility of the 37th Motorized Brigade, whose victims were exhumed from mass graves in Rudnica. Military documents, including orders and combat reports of the 37th Motorized Brigade, indicating that members of the brigade participated in at least two of the four crimes. Moreover, orders signed by General Diković for clearing up of the territory show that the 37th Motorised Brigade was responsible for removing the bodies of Kosovo Albanians in their area of responsibility, which indicates that the members of this brigade, have since then took part in the cover-up of civilian bodies found in Rudnica.

However, none of the claims in these dossiers were investigated by the national and international courts, nor were the members of 37th Motorised Brigade prosecuted for the alleged war crimes.

Military offices
Preceded by Miloje Miletić	Chief of the General Staff of the Serbian Armed Forces; 12 December 2011 – 14 September 2018	Succeeded by Milan Mojsilović
