= Stefan Jovanović (politician) =

Serbian politician

- Стефан Јовановић
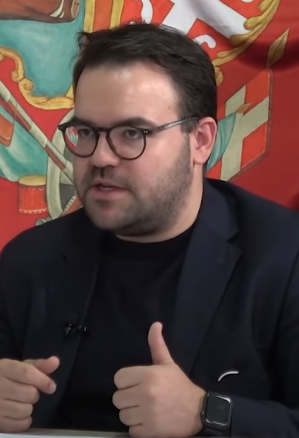
- Jovanović in October 2021

Member of the National Assembly
- In office 1 August 2022 – 6 February 2024
- President: Vladimir Orlić

Personal details
- Born: 1989 (age 36–37) Niš, SR Serbia, SFR Yugoslavia
- Party: Narodna (2017–present)
- Education: University of Niš

Stefan Jovanović (born 1989) is a Serbian politician who served as a member of the National Assembly from 2022 to 2024. He is vice-president of the Center for International Relations and Sustainable Development (CIRSD) and director of the Horizons Forum. He previously served as secretary-general, spokesperson and vice-president of the People's Party.

== Biography ==
Jovanović was born in 1989 in Niš, SR Serbia, SFR Yugoslavia. He graduated from the Faculty of Law at the University of Niš. In 2014, he was elected the first student ombudsman of the university's student parliament.

In May 2026, he defended his master's thesis at the same faculty, entitled The Organization of Public Administration in the People's Republic of China.

After graduating, he began working as a legal and administrative adviser at CIRSD, whose president is Vuk Jeremić. He was part of Jeremić's team during his candidacy for the position of Secretary-General of the United Nations. He has also served as manager of the Mihailo Miško Jeremić Foundation.

He subsequently became vice-president and head of communications at CIRSD. He is also director of the Horizons Forum, an international forum focused on sustainability and connectivity.

== Political career ==
In October 2017, Jovanović was elected secretary-general of the People's Party at its founding assembly. In January 2021, he was elected spokesperson of the party.

In the 2022 Serbian general election, the People's Party contested as part of the United for the Victory of Serbia alliance, and Jovanović was elected to the National Assembly. He initially served as deputy head of the People's Party parliamentary group. In August 2023, following Miroslav Aleksić's departure from the party, Jovanović became head of its parliamentary group. His parliamentary term ended on 6 February 2024.

Jovanović served as a representative of Serbia in the Parliamentary Assembly of the Council of Europe from 10 October 2022 to 14 April 2024. He was a member of its Committee on Migration, Refugees and Displaced Persons and its Committee on Culture, Science, Education and Media.

On 23 December 2023, he resigned as secretary-general of the People's Party following its defeat in the parliamentary election. He was elected a vice-president of the party on 24 February 2024 and subsequently ceased to hold that position.
