= Gordana Čabrić =

Serbian politician (born 1962)

Gordana Čabrić (Serbian Cyrillic: Гордана Чабрић; born 6 December 1962) is a politician in Serbia. She was a member of the National Assembly of Serbia from 2004 to 2007, serving with the Democratic Party of Serbia (Demokratska stranka Srbije, DSS). Now a member of the Varvarin municipal assembly, she is aligned with the People's Party (Narodna stranka, NS) at the republic level.

== Private career ==
Čabrić is a medical doctor and administrator. In 2001, while serving as head of the health centre in Varvarin, she gave an interview on the safety of drinking water in that community and in nearby Ćićevac.

== Politician ==
=== Parliamentarian ===
Čabrić appeared in the sixtieth position on the DSS's electoral list in the 2003 Serbian parliamentary election. The list won fifty-three seats; she was not initially included in her party's assembly delegation but received a mandate on 13 July 2004 as the replacement for another party member. (From 2000 to 2011, mandates in Serbian parliamentary elections were awarded to sponsoring parties or coalitions rather than individual candidates, and it was common practice for the mandates to be distributed out of numerical order. Čabrić's position on the list had no formal bearing on whether or when she received a seat.) The DSS emerged as the leading party in Serbia's coalition government after the election, and Čabrić served as a government supporter. She was a member of the assembly committee for health and the family.

Serbia briefly introduced the direct election of mayors in the 2004 local elections. Čabrić was the DSS's candidate in Varvarin and was eliminated in the first round of voting.

The DSS contested the 2007 parliamentary election in an alliance with New Serbia (Nova Srbija, NS), and Čabrić received the seventy-sixth position on their combined list. The alliance won forty-seven seats, and she was not given a mandate for a second term.

Serbia's electoral laws were reformed in 2011, such that all mandates were awarded to candidates on successful lists in numerical order.

=== Recent local politics ===
Čabrić received the third position on the electoral list of the Serbian Renewal Movement (Srpski pokret obnove, SPO) in Varvarin in the 2016 local elections and was elected when the list won fourteen mandates. The SPO, which had governed Varvarin for several terms, narrowly lost the election and its members served afterward in opposition. After a split in the SPO at the republic level, Čabrić became the leader of a local political group in Varvarin called "Naši Ljudi." She led the movement's list in the 2020 local elections and was re-elected when the list won five mandates.

Čabrić appeared in the 203rd position on the United for the Victory of Serbia list in the 2022 parliamentary election, receiving an endorsement from the People's Party. Election from this position was extremely improbable, and she was not elected when the list won thirty-eight seats.

== Electoral record ==
=== Local (Varvarin) ===
2004 Municipality of Varvarin local election: Mayor of Varvarin (second round results)
Candidate	Party	Votes	%
Zoran Milenković (incumbent)	Serbian Renewal Movement	4,399	51.86
Vojkan Pavić	Socialist Party of Serbia	4,084	48.14
Gordana Čabrić	Democratic Party of Serbia (eliminated in the first round)		
other candidates	eliminated in the first round		
Total		8,483	100.00
