= Slobodan Cvejić =

Serbian sociologist and professor

- Слободан Цвејић
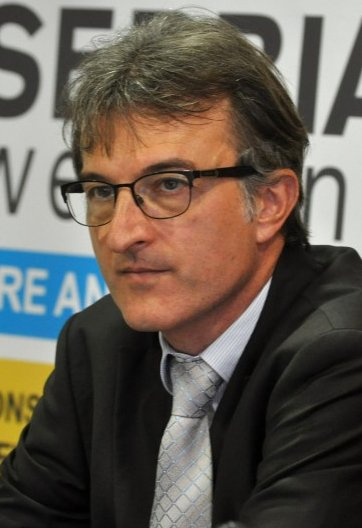
- Cvejić in 2015

Member of the Council of the Regulatory Body for Electronic Media
- In office 14 February 2020 – 22 December 2020

Personal details
- Born: 1965 (age 60–61) Šabac, SR Serbia, SFR Yugoslavia
- Party: Serbia Centre (2022–present)
- Education: University of Belgrade

Slobodan Cvejić (Serbian Cyrillic: Слободан Цвејић; born 1965) is a Serbian sociologist, university professor and politician who is a vice-president of the centrist Serbia Centre (SRCE) since 2022.

== Early life and education ==
Cvejić was born in 1965 in Šabac, SR Serbia, SFR Yugoslavia. He obtained his bachelor's degree, master's degree, and PhD in sociology from the Faculty of Philosophy at the University of Belgrade.

== Academic career ==
Cvejić currently teaches undergraduate and master's courses at the Faculty of Philosophy, as well as master's courses at the University of Belgrade and the University of Arts in Belgrade.

He was a visiting researcher at University College London. He is a member of the Sociological Association of Serbia and Montenegro and the Serbian Sociological Society, as well as the International Sociological Association. He is one of the founders of the citizens' association SeConS, a group for development initiatives and a member of the board of directors of the European Network Against Poverty - Serbia. He was involved in the work of various bodies of the Government of Serbia in the field of education and employment. He participated in numerous research projects, and was the manager of several of them. Since 2006, he has continuously participated in research projects financed by the Ministry of Education, Science and Technological Development of Serbia. He was the head of the research team of the University of Belgrade on the EU TEMPUS project EQUI ED, the head of the national research team for Serbia on the project on Roma marginalization, researcher on the comparative European project on social enterprises and researcher on the comparative project South East European Social Survey Project. He participated in research funded by various organizations such as the UN System, European Commission, World Bank, European Investment Bank, DFID, USAID, Open Society Foundations and other international institutions and organizations. From 2016 to 2019, he was the editor-in-chief of the journal Sociologija.

== Political career ==
In July 2022, Cvejić joined the newly founded centrist political organization Serbia Centre (SRCE) of Zdravko Ponoš and was later elected its vice-president.

== Other activities ==
In February 2020, the National Assembly appointed Cvejić a member of the council of the Regulatory Body for Electronic Media (REM). He submitted his resignation as a member of the REM Council on 22 December 2020 as a sign of protest against the appointment of pro-government council member Olivera Zekić as the president of the council.
