= Ana Jakovljević =

Serbian politician (born 1981)

- Ана Јаковљевић

Member of the National Assembly of the Republic of Serbia
- Incumbent
- Assumed office 6 February 2024

Member of the Parliamentary Assembly of the Council of Europe
- Incumbent
- Assumed office 15 April 2024

Personal details
- Born: 1981
- Party: NPS

Ana Jakovljević (Serbian Cyrillic: Ана Јаковљевић; born 1981) is a lawyer, academic administrator, and politician. She has served in the Serbian parliament since 2024 as a member of the People's Movement of Serbia (NPS).

== Early career ==
Jakovljević holds a bachelor's degree from the University of Belgrade Faculty of Law and a master of laws degree from Loyola University New Orleans. She completed her doctoral studies through the European Doctorate in Law and Economics program, organized by Erasmus University Rotterdam, the University of Bologna, and the University of Hamburg. Her thesis was titled "Fighting Pyramid Corruption – A Legal and Economic Approach to Combatting Corruption in Post-Socialist Countries."

Jakovljević worked in Serbia's ministry of education and sport from 2005 to 2008 as an advisor in the higher education sector. She was later the director of the University of Belgrade's Center for Quality Assurance from 2010 to 2018. From that year until 2021, Jakovljević secretary of the National Body for Accreditation and Quality Assurance in Higher Education of the Republic of Serbia.

Jakovljević has been a lawyer since 2023 and lives in the central Belgrade municipality of Savski Venac.

== Political career ==
Jakovljević joined the People's Movement of Serbia when the party was re-established in 2023 and was elected as one of its inaugural vice-presidents in November of that year.

NPS contested the 2023 Serbian parliamentary election as part of the Serbia Against Violence (SPN) coalition. Jakovljević received the forty-ninth position on the SPN's electoral list and was elected when it won sixty-five mandates. She took her seat when the new assembly convened in February 2024. The Serbian Progressive Party (SNS) and its allies won the election, and NPS representatives served in opposition.

The People's Movement of Serbia later contested the 2024 Belgrade City Assembly election as part of the Biramo! coalition. Jakovljević was given the thirty-sixth position on the coalition's list and was not elected when it won fourteen seats. She also appeared in the eighteenth position on the Biramo! list for the concurrent Savski Venac municipal vote and narrowly missed election when the list won sixteen seats.

In the national assembly, Jakovljević is a member of the committee on human rights and gender equality, the European integration committee, the foreign affairs committee, and the working group for the improvement of the electoral process. In July 2026, she accused the SNS-led government of hypocritically submitting ineffective legislation on electoral reform in order to continue receiving European Union (EU) funds. She is also a member of the parliamentary friendship groups with China, Cuba, France, Germany, Japan, the United Kingdom, the United States of America, the Caribbean countries, (Note: This parliamentary friendship group comprises Antigua and Barbuda, the Bahamas, Barbados, Belize, Dominica, the Dominican Republic, Grenada, Haiti, Panama, Saint Kitts and Nevis, Saint Lucia, Saint Vincent and the Grenadines, and Trinidad and Tobago.) and the countries of Southeast Asia, (Note: This parliamentary friendship group comprises Brunei Darussalam, Cambodia, Indonesia, Laos, Malaysia, Myanmar, the Philippines, Singapore, Thailand, and Vietnam.), as well as the friendship group with Italy, the Holy See, and the Sovereign Order of Malta.

Since April 2024, Jakovljević has been a substitute member of the Serbian parliament's delegation to the Parliamentary Assembly of the Council of Europe (PACE), where she is an alternate member of the committee on migration, international protection, and economic co-operation. She delivered a speech to the PACE in June 2026, arguing that Serbia was facing a deep crisis of institutions and a lack of official responsibility, due to the government's poor response to ongoing anti-corruption protests. She also accused the government of eroding university autonomy, saying that professors who supported student protests had faced negative consequences. She is not a member of any assembly together in the PACE.
