= Đorđe Stanković =

Serbian politician

- Ђорђе Станковић
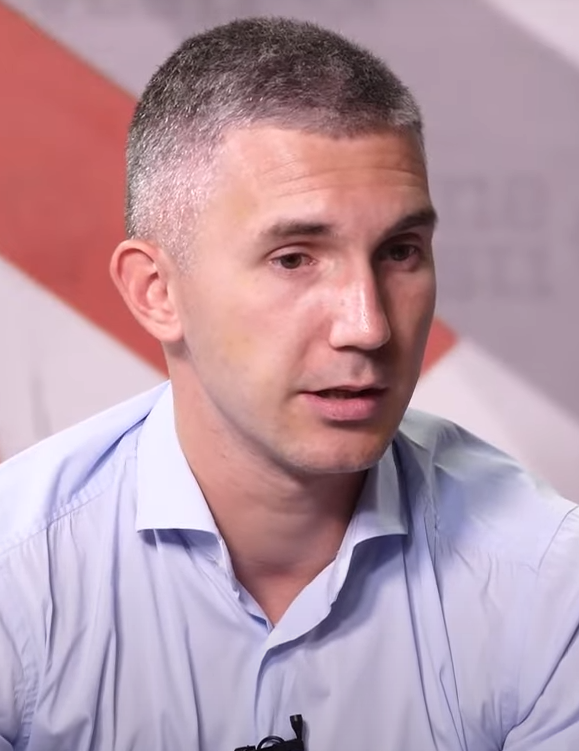
- Stanković in August 2023

Member of the National Assembly
- Incumbent
- Assumed office 1 August 2022
- President: Vladimir Orlić

Personal details
- Born: April 22, 1989 (age 37) Niš, SR Serbia, SFR Yugoslavia
- Party: Narodna (until 2023); NPS (since 2023)
- Education: University of Niš

Đorđe Stanković (Serbian Cyrillic: Ђорђе Станковић; born 22 April 1989) is a Serbian politician who has been a member of the National Assembly since 1 August 2022. He was a vice president of the People's Party (Narodna) until 2023.

== Biography ==
Stanković was born on 22 April 1989 in Niš, SR Serbia, SFR Yugoslavia. He graduated from the Faculty of Civil Engineering and Architecture at the University of Niš. After finishing his undergraduate and master's studies in 2014, he moved to Belgrade, where he continued his career in a German company in the position of construction coordinator, where he spent 3 years. Later he founded his own company in Niš, which deals with real estate and design.

His political career started in February 2021 when he was appointed president of the centre-right People's Party (Narodna) branch in Niš. In December 2021, he was elected vice president of the party.

In the 2022 general election, the People's Party contested as part of the United for the Victory of Serbia alliance and Stanković was elected MP. Following the constitution of the National Assembly, Jovanović was sworn in as MP on 1 August 2022. Following a split in the People's Party in August 2023, Stanković sided with Miroslav Aleksić and joined the People's Movement of Serbia (NPS).
