= People's Party (Serbia, 2017) =

Political party in Serbia

People's Party Народна странка
- Abbreviation: Narodna
- President: Vladimir Gajić
- Vice-Presidents: Aleksandar Radojević; Aleksandar Marković; Gordana Čabrić; Jovica Todorović; Borislav Borović; Nebojša Bogdanović
- Founders: Vuk Jeremić; Miroslav Aleksić
- Founded: 22 October 2017
- Preceded by: People's Movement of Serbia
- Headquarters: Njegoševa 76, Belgrade
- Youth wing: Youth of the People's Party
- Women's wing: Women's Network
- Ideology: Conservatism; Serbian nationalism
- Political position: Right-wing
- National affiliation: Alternative for Serbia
- Colours: Blue; Red
- National Assembly: 0 / 250
- Assembly of Vojvodina: 0 / 120
- City Assembly of Belgrade: 0 / 110

Party flag

Website
- narodna.org.rs

The People's Party (Serbian: Народна странка, romanised: Narodna stranka, abbr. Narodna) is a conservative political party in Serbia. It has been led by Vladimir Gajić since 2024.

Narodna was formed in October 2017 after Vuk Jeremić re-organised the People's Movement of Serbia (NPS), a political party led by Miroslav Aleksić. It cooperated with Dragan Đilas and the Movement of Free Citizens and Serbian Left, with whom Narodna took part in the 2018 Belgrade City Assembly election and won 19% of the popular vote. Narodna then joined the Alliance for Serbia (SZS), a coalition formed by Đilas, which organised mass anti-government protests after the physical attack on Borko Stefanović in November 2018. Together with SZS, Narodna boycotted the 2020 parliamentary election, claiming that its conditions would not be free and fair. Narodna was later a member of the United Opposition of Serbia, which existed between August 2020 and January 2021, and then the United for the Victory of Serbia (UZPS) coalition.

With UZPS, Narodna took part in the 2022 general elections and nominated Zdravko Ponoš, a then-member of Narodna, as their presidential candidate. Ponoš lost the presidential election while Narodna won 12 seats in the National Assembly, although due to conflicts between Narodna and the Party of Freedom and Justice (SSP), UZPS was dissolved after the elections. Narodna had its own parliamentary groups in the National Assembly and City Assembly of Belgrade, while serving in opposition to the Serbian Progressive Party. A schism within the party occurred in 2023, which resulted in Aleksić and other members leaving Narodna and refounding NPS. Narodna failed to retain its representation in the 2023 elections. Initially a centre-right party, Narodna has throughout time shifted to very right-wing and nationalistic positions. Previously supportive of the accession of Serbia to the European Union, it has shifted towards Eurosceptic positions and it declares itself to be in favour of military neutrality.

== History ==
=== Formation ===
Following his unsuccessful bid in an attempt to replace Ban Ki-moon as United Nations Secretary-General in late 2016, Vuk Jeremić, the former minister of foreign affairs of Serbia, announced in January 2017 that he would run in the April 2017 Serbian presidential election. Jeremić won 5.7 percent of the popular vote and placed fourth in the presidential election. After the election, Jeremić announced in June 2017 the formation of a political party which he said "would be positioned on the centre-right on the political spectrum" (da će to biti stranka desnog centra). Jeremić received support from Dijana Vukomanović, a former member of the Socialist Party of Serbia, and Siniša Kovačević, a playwright.

Miroslav Aleksić, the leader of the People's Movement of Serbia (NPS), offered Jeremić to not form a party, but to re-organise his instead under a different name. Jeremić accepted this and announced that the founding assembly would be held on 22 October 2017. At the founding assembly, Jeremić was elected president of the People's Party (abbr. Narodna); Aleksić was elected as first vice-president; and Kovačević, Sanda Rašković Ivić, Svetozar Čiplić, Zdravko Ponoš, and Nikola Jovanović were elected vice-presidents of the party. Narodna also gained three seats in the National Assembly, with Aleksić, Rašković Ivić, and Vukomanović serving as its representatives.

=== 2017–2019 ===
Following the formation, Narodna began cooperating with the Movement of Free Citizens (PSG), a political organisation led by Saša Janković. Together with PSG and the Serbian Left (LS), Narodna announced in January 2018 that Dragan Đilas would be their joint mayoral candidate for the 2018 Belgrade City Assembly election. The coalition ended up placing second and won 19 percent of the popular vote; Narodna won 5 seats in the City Assembly of Belgrade. Following the election, Đilas proposed the idea of creating an opposition alliance with a collective leadership; Narodna supported this proposal. This was initially realised in the City Assembly of Belgrade when Narodna, LS and the group led by Đilas formed the Alliance for Serbia (SZS) in May 2018, however on national level, SZS was formalised in September 2018. After the physical attack on the leader of LS, Borko Stefanović, in November 2018, SzS organised mass anti-government protests.

In January 2019, Narodna, as well as other members of SZS, announced that they would boycott the sessions of the National Assembly, claiming that the National Assembly had no legitimacy due to the obstruction of the government over the opposition by allegedly violating the rules of the National Assembly, laws, and the Constitution. Additionally, Rašković Ivić announced that Narodna would boycott the 2020 parliamentary election and Vojvodina provincial election; this was also announced by SZS in September 2019. They claimed that the election would not be free and fair. At the party assembly in November 2019, Jeremić was re-elected as president of Narodna, while the incumbent vice-presidents, except Čiplić who was replaced by Borislav Novaković, were also re-elected.

=== 2020–2022 ===
The mass protests which began in 2018 formally ended in March 2020 due to the proclamation of the COVID-19 pandemic in Serbia. Following the 2020 parliamentary election, SZS was dissolved and vice-president Jovanović left Narodna. Jovanović was opposed to leaving the SZS parliamentary group. This coalition was transformed into the United Opposition of Serbia (UOPS) in August 2020, in which Narodna also took part. In September 2020, Narodna chose Ponoš as their representative for the upcoming Belgrade City Assembly election, although he later rejected this offer. UOPS was unstable and conflicts between Narodna and the Party of Freedom and Justice (SSP), a political party led by Đilas, occurred inside the coalition. Narodna also opposed the move of SSP and the Democratic Party (DS) to form a joint platform with PSG for the inter-party dialogues on electoral conditions, considering that PSG did not boycott the 2020 parliamentary election. This led to the dissolution of UOPS, which Narodna confirmed in January 2021. Additionally, Narodna presented its platform for the inter-party dialogues on electoral conditions with the Civic Platform, Movement of Free Serbia, and Slobodan Samardžić. The dialogues lasted from July to October 2021. During this period, SSP and Narodna renewed their cooperation and subsequently announced that they would take part in a joint coalition for the 2022 general election.

Narodna opposed the proposed constitutional changes which were voted on a referendum in January 2022. A month later, the coalition between Narodna, SSP, DS, and PSG was formalised under the name United for the Victory of Serbia (UZPS); the coalition nominated Ponoš as their presidential candidate and Vladeta Janković as their mayoral candidate for the 2022 Belgrade City Assembly election. UZPS campaigned on forming technocratic teams, an anti-corruption body, lustration and transparency. In the parliamentary election, the coalition won 14 percent of the popular vote, while Narodna won 12 seats in the National Assembly. In the presidential election, Ponoš placed second and won 18 percent of the popular vote, while in the Belgrade City Assembly election, the UZPS coalition won 21 percent of the popular vote; Narodna won 6 seats. Following the election, Ponoš left Narodna and formed Serbia Centre (SRCE), while UZPS disintegrated. Narodna criticised the meeting between Đilas and Aleksandar Vučić that occurred shortly after the elections, and in response Marinika Tepić accused Narodna of populism. Following the elections, Narodna remained in opposition and formed their own parliamentary groups in the City Assembly of Belgrade and National Assembly of Serbia. It also remained critical of PSG and SSP.

=== 2023–present ===
Narodna took part in the 2023 mass protests, which were triggered after the Belgrade school shooting and a mass murder near Mladenovac and Smederevo in early May 2023. A month later, after a closed session of the party's main board, news media alleged that there was a dispute between Aleksić and Jeremić. The presidency, headed by Jeremić, eventually removed Aleksić from the position as the president of the party's executive board on 15 July. Đorđe Stanković, a vice-president of Narodna, described the move as a "coup d'état" (puč) and accused Jeremić of "autocracy" (autokratija), while general secretary Stefan Jovanović denied that it was a coup d'état. Jovanović claimed that "it would represent a conflict of interest within the party" (to predstavlja određenu vrstu sukoba interesa unutar partije) if Aleksić remained president of the executive board. Aleksić also publicly acknowledged the conflict, describing it as a "frontal conflict between Jeremić and me" (frontalnim sukobom između Vuka Jeremića i mene).

A leadership election was held on 22 October 2023 at which Jeremić was successfully re-elected. Although Jeremić and Aleksić were initially announced as the candidates for the position, Aleksić and other members of Narodna left the party on 6 August. Aleksić announced the reconstitution of NPS with Novaković, Đorđe Stanković, Slavica Radovanović, and the councillors in the City Assembly of Belgrade. Aleksić also said that although he does not have personal problems with Jeremić, "we have conceptual differences and a different view on the directions the party should have taken" (mi imamo konceptualne razlike, drugačije viđenje pravaca kojima je stranaka trebalo da se kreće). Miloš Bešić, a professor at the Faculty of Political Sciences of University of Belgrade, has assessed that the split harmed the party and its reputation.

Shortly before the 2023 leadership election, the Šabac-based "Awakening" organisation, led by Dušan Tufegdžić and Vladimir Terzić, merged into Narodna. Narodna announced that it would run in the 2023 elections independently, first submitting its electoral list for the 2023 parliamentary election and then for the 2023 Belgrade City Assembly election. They nominated Gajić as their mayoral candidate for Belgrade. On 27 November, their electoral list for the 2023 Vojvodina provincial election was also proclaimed. It failed to cross the threshold in the parliamentary, provincial, and Belgrade City Assembly elections. Following the election, all members of the presidency resigned from their positions. Jeremić resigned as president of Narodna while Rašković Ivić announced her retirement from politics. New leadership was elected in February 2024. In the 2024 Belgrade City Assembly election, Narodna formed an electoral list with Velimir Ilić's New Serbia and the anti-vax far-right I Live for Serbia organisation. The joint electoral list failed to gain representation. In the municipality of Vračar, however, Narodna gained representation and rejected the cooperation with the opposition, thus allowing SNS to continue governing the municipality.

== Ideology and platform ==
=== Political leanings ===
At the founding assembly in October 2017, Narodna stated its support for "military neutrality, independent institutions, depoliticisation of the Security Intelligence Agency, and the adoption of the law on lustration" (vojna neutralnost zemlje, nezavisne institucije... depolitizaciju aparata službi bezbednosti u Srbiji, kao i potreba usvajanja zakona o lustraciji). Shortly after the founding assembly, Rašković Ivić also defined Narodna as centrist, stating that Narodna combines conservative views, as well as support for rule of law and workers' rights. In its political programme, Narodna stated its support for "political revanchism towards members and helpers of Vučić" (politički revanšizam prema pripadnicima i pomagačima režima Aleksandra Vučića). It serves in opposition to the ruling Serbian Progressive Party.

Initially, Narodna was positioned on the centre-right on the political spectrum. It has since then been described as a right-wing party, with Dušan Spasojević, a professor at the Faculty of Political Sciences of University of Belgrade, and journalist Zoran Panović noting that following the dissolution of SZS, Narodna has shifted from the centre-right to more right-wing positions. Spasojević added in 2023 that Jeremić has been more open to cooperate with right-wing parties and that he has tried to portray Narodna as the Democratic Party of Serbia under the leadership of Vojislav Koštunica. Aleksić, who left Narodna in 2023, was a member seen as a moderate who is in favour of creating a coalition with pro-European parties and unlike Jeremić, is rather centred on anti-corruption rhetoric. Panović also argued that Aleksić could have brought Narodna back to the ideological centre. Ideologically, Narodna has been described as a liberal-conservative and a conservative party. It is a self-described "state-building and patriotic organisation". After the schism in 2023, Narodna embraced very nationalistic positions.

=== Foreign policies ===
Narodna began as a pro-European party and was supportive of the accession of Serbia to the European Union, although it later shifted to more Eurosceptic positions. In a Heinrich Böll Foundation report written by Spasojević, and professors Slobodan Cvejić, Dragan Stanojević, and Bojan Todosijević, Narodna has been also described as a less "European Union enthusiastic party". Rašković Ivić stated that she remained an Eurosceptic after becoming vice-president of Narodna while Jeremić remained orientated towards pro-Europeanism. Vladimir Gajić, the president of Narodna, has criticised the European Union, claiming that it leads an "imperialist policy in the Balkans" (imperijalnu politiku na Balkanu). It supported a referendum on European Union membership. As of October 2023, Narodna supports Serbia joining the European Economic Area, instead of the European Union.

Following the 2022 Russian invasion of Ukraine, Narodna has voiced its opposition to sanctioning Russia, but it has also supported a discussion about it in the National Assembly. Narodna supports retaining close relations with Russia. It is also opposed to the recognition of Kosovo, and together with Dveri, New Democratic Party of Serbia (NDSS), and Serbian Party Oathkeepers (SSZ) parties, it signed a joint declaration for the "reintegration of Kosovo into the constitutional and legal order of Serbia" (reintegraciju KiM u ustavno-pravni poredak Srbije) in October 2022. However since then, Narodna has "remained on the sideline, while Dveri, NDSS, SSZ, and Movement for the Restoration of the Kingdom of Serbia cooperated more intensively", despite their similar positions regarding Kosovo. Narodna has voiced its opposition to the 2023 Ohrid Agreement and has instead proposed a referendum to be held on the matter. It has criticised the Serb List, the dominant party in North Kosovo, due to their political dominance in the region.

=== Domestic issues ===
In June 2021, Narodna stated that the electoral threshold should be raised to 10 percent, claiming that "we would then know who would be in the government and who would be in the opposition" (da bismo konačno znali ko je vlast, ko opozicija). As of 2020, the threshold is 3 percent. It has also stated its opposition to Rio Tinto, an Anglo-Australian mining company, and its Project Jadar. Narodna opposes lithium mining and supports a complete ban on it. Narodna supports introducing mandatory conscription, citing other military neutral countries as an example.

Narodna opposed the manifestation of 2022 EuroPride in Belgrade. The "Proclamation on the Serbian question in the 21st century" was adopted by Narodna at its 4th Congress in October 2023, with Jeremić saying that "freedom, independence, self-reliance, and strength" are Narodna's four pillars. Narodna has said that it supports family values.

== Organisation ==
Narodna was led by its co-founder Vuk Jeremić until his resignation in December 2023. Since February 2024, Gajić has served as president of Narodna. Aleksandar Radojević, Stefan Jovanović, Aleksandar Marković, Gordana Čabrić, Jovica Todorović, Borislav Borović, and Nebojša Bogdanović are the vice-presidents of Narodna. During its time in the National Assembly, Jovanović served as the party's parliamentary leader since Aleksić's resignation in August 2023. Aleksandar Ljubomirović serves as the party's youth wing, the Youth of the People's Party. Narodna also has a women's wing named Women's Network. Since its formation, three movements have split from Narodna, this being Experts Should Have A Say (Da se struka pita) in 2021, SRCE in 2022, and NPS in 2023.

Its headquarters is located at Njegoševa 76, Belgrade. In May 2021, Narodna claimed that it had around 13,000 registered members.

=== International cooperation ===
In the Parliamentary Assembly of the Council of Europe, Narodna was represented by Jovanović, who sat in the European Conservatives Group and Democratic Alliance (EC/DA). Narodna made an announcement when Jovanović joined the EC/DA in October 2023, stating that "many friends of Serbia who understand our position regarding Kosovo and Metohija" are part of the group; they named far-right Brothers of Italy and French National Rally parties as examples.

=== List of presidents ===
#	President		Birth–Death	Term start	Term end
1	Vuk Jeremić	An image of Vuk Jeremić in 2020	1975–	22 October 2017	22 December 2023
2	Vladimir Gajić	An image of Vladimir Gajić in 2020	1965–	24 February 2024	Incumbent

== Electoral performance ==
=== Parliamentary elections ===
National Assembly of Serbia
Year	Leader	Popular vote	% of popular vote	#	# of seats	Seat change	Coalition	Status	Ref.
2020	Vuk Jeremić	Election boycott			0 / 250	▼3	SZS	Extra-parliamentary	
2022	Vuk Jeremić	520,469	14.09%	▲2nd	12 / 250	▲12	UZPS	Opposition	
2023	Vuk Jeremić	33,388	0.90%	▼10th	0 / 250	▼12	–	Extra-parliamentary	
2026	Vladimir Gajić	3,705	0.08%	▼14th	0 / 250	0	NS–BUNT	Extra-parliamentary	

=== Presidential elections ===
President of Serbia
Year	Candidate	1st round popular vote		% of popular vote	2nd round popular vote		% of popular vote	Ref.
2022	Zdravko Ponoš	2nd	698,538	18.84%	—N/a	—	—	

=== Provincial elections ===
Assembly of Vojvodina
Year	Leader	Popular vote	% of popular vote	#	# of seats	Seat change	Coalition	Status	Ref.
2020	Vuk Jeremić	Election boycott			0 / 120	0	SZS	Extra-parliamentary	
2023	Vuk Jeremić	8,140	0.85%	▲11th	0 / 250	0	–	Extra-parliamentary	

=== Belgrade City Assembly elections ===
City Assembly of Belgrade
Year	Leader	Popular vote	% of popular vote	#	# of seats	Seat change	Coalition	Status	Ref.
2018	Vuk Jeremić	154,147	18.93%	▲2nd	5 / 110	▲5	Narodna–PSG–LS–Đilas	Opposition	
2022	Vuk Jeremić	195,335	21.78%	2nd	6 / 110	▲1	UZPS	Opposition	
2023	Vuk Jeremić	19,141	2.08%	▼7th	0 / 250	▼5	–	Extra-parliamentary	
2024	Vladimir Gajić	4,213	0.59%	▼11th	0 / 250	0	Narodna–NS–ŽZS	Extra-parliamentary	
