= Serbia Centre =

Political party in Serbia

Serbia Centre Србија центар
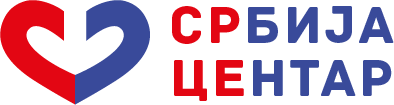
- Abbreviation: SRCE
- President: Vacant
- Vice-Presidents: Mihailo Brkić; Slobodan Cvejić; Tatjana Marković Topalović
- Founder: Zdravko Ponoš
- Founded: 26 June 2022
- Registered: 12 July 2023
- Split from: People's Party
- Headquarters: Stojana Protića 48, Belgrade
- Ideology: Pro-Europeanism
- Political position: Centre
- National affiliation: Platform for a European Serbia
- Colours: Blue; Red
- National Assembly: 0 / 250
- Assembly of Vojvodina: 4 / 120
- City Assembly of Belgrade: 0 / 110

Website
- srce-org.rs

Serbia Centre (Serbian: Србија центар, romanised: Srbija centar, abbr. SRCE, lit. 'heart') is a centrist political party in Serbia. It was founded and led by Zdravko Ponoš, the former chief of the General Staff of the Serbian Armed Forces from 2006 to 2008, until his resignation in November 2026.

Ponoš was the presidential candidate of the United for the Victory of Serbia alliance in the 2022 presidential election. Shortly after the election, SRCE was formed as a split from the People's Party. It became a registered political party in July 2023, after which it became a member of the Serbia Against Violence coalition that contested the parliamentary, Vojvodina provincial, and Belgrade City Assembly elections in December 2023. In those elections, SRCE gained representation in all bodies. It lost its representation in the City Assembly of Belgrade after boycotting the 2024 Belgrade City Assembly election.

SRCE was in opposition to the Serbian Progressive Party (SNS) until the SNS lost power in the 2026 election, and supports the accession of Serbia to the European Union. It supports fighting climate change, increasing child allowance, and the reform of the pension system. Since the beginning of the student-led anti-corruption protests in 2024, SRCE has voiced its support for the students and called for early parliamentary elections and the formation of a transitional government as an end to the crisis started by the protests. It is a member of the Platform for a European Serbia coalition, on whose "European Serbia" list it contested the 2026 parliamentary election; the list won 0.29% of the vote and failed to cross the electoral threshold, after which vice-president Duško Lopandić resigned from all his party functions and Ponoš resigned as party president.

== History ==
=== Formation ===
Zdravko Ponoš, a member and former vice-president of the People's Party (Narodna), as well as the chief of the General Staff of the Serbian Armed Forces from 2006 to 2008, was a candidate in the 2022 Serbian presidential election, on behalf of the United for the Victory of Serbia coalition. He placed second behind incumbent president Aleksandar Vučić, winning 18% of the popular vote. Following the election, he left Narodna and announced that he would work on creating a movement or political party. Serbia Centre (SRCE) was founded on 26 June 2022 and officially presented to the public on 6 July.

=== 2022–2026 ===
After its inception, it cooperated with the Democratic Party (DS), Together, and Green–Left Front opposition parties. Its offices in Vranje were attacked by an unknown group of assailants in February 2023. SRCE supported the mass protests that began after the Belgrade school shooting and Mladenovac and Smederevo shootings in May 2023. In August 2023, SRCE, DS, and Together signed a cooperation agreement. SRCE became part of the Serbia Against Violence (SPN) coalition in October 2023, which were organising the 2023 protests. SPN announced that it would contest the parliamentary, Vojvodina provincial, and Belgrade City Assembly elections, all scheduled for 17 December 2023. In the parliamentary election, SPN won 65 seats, nine of which went to SRCE.

When the National Assembly of Serbia and Assembly of Vojvodina were constituted, the SPN split into several parliamentary groups. The City Assembly of Belgrade, on the other hand, was not constituted because the quorum was not met during its constitutive session. A new Belgrade City Assembly election was then called for 2 June. SPN dissolved shortly after; SRCE opted not to take part in the election.

Since the beginning of the student-led anti-corruption protests in 2024, SRCE has supported the students. Following the resignation of Miloš Vučević as prime minister of Serbia in 2025, SRCE was one of the parties that supported the formation of a transitional government as an end to the crisis started by the protests. The signatories said that according to their plan, the transitional government would fulfil student demands, organise free and fair elections, and revise the voter list. SRCE has additionally called for early parliamentary elections. In May 2025, Slobodan Ilić, a member of parliament, left SRCE, reducing their presence to eight seats.

In June 2026, SRCE became part of the Platform for a European Serbia coalition, alongside the Party of Freedom and Justice and Movement of Free Citizens.

=== 2026 parliamentary election ===
Ahead of the 2026 parliamentary election, several opposition parties withdrew their lists in favour of the Student List, and some of SRCE's local boards urged the party to do the same; Ponoš replied that SRCE would not withdraw. SRCE contested the election on the "European Serbia" list, together with the Party of Freedom and Justice and Goran Ješić's Solidarity civic movement. In mid-September, MP Slobodan Petrović and presidency member Boško Šindić announced that they were leaving the party over its decision to take part in the election; Petrović said that he had hoped until the last moment that the party would change its position. The list won 12,570 votes (0.29%) and failed to cross the electoral threshold.

On 27 October, vice-president Duško Lopandić resigned from all his functions in the party. He said that he, part of the leadership and many members had argued from the start for withdrawing from the campaign because of its referendum character, and that he had refused to be a candidate on the European Serbia list; he also accused the party leadership of avoiding responsibility for the defeat and of expelling Petrović, who had supported the Student List.

On 3 November, the party's Presidency accepted Ponoš's resignation as president; the Presidency and the Executive Board are to lead the party until an electoral assembly, to be held within six months. The party said that the fall of the Vučić and SNS government was the most important step towards normalising the situation in Serbia, and that SRCE would continue as an extra-parliamentary party focused on Serbia's accession to the European Union; it added that it would not act as an opposition, but would support the new government's policies that advanced this agenda.

== Ideology and platform ==
SRCE is a centrist political party. According to Dušan Spasojević, a professor at the Faculty of Political Sciences of the University of Belgrade, during the 2022 electoral campaign Ponoš had "quite unclear positions on key issues" (dosta nejasan oko ključnih pitanja), but had shown "a noticeable shift to the left" (ali je sad primetno njegovo blago pomeranje ulevo) since the formation of SRCE. While in opposition, it criticised the then-ruling Serbian Progressive Party, accusing it of populism and allegedly "destroying the education" (ubije obrazovanje) in Serbia. SRCE has also expressed support for cooperation between opposition parties. Following the Belgrade school shooting and Mladenovac and Smederevo shootings, SRCE expressed its support for the formation of a transitional government. They have again called for the formation of a transitional government during the student-led anti-corruption protests.

According to Marko Vujić, an assistant at the Faculty of Political Sciences of the University of Belgrade, SRCE is a "climate responsible" organisation that has an elaborate strategy to fight climate change. SRCE supports declaring milk as a strategic product for Serbia and adopting measures that would revive the milk production sector. It has criticised the government's approach towards workers at Zastava Arms in January 2023. SRCE supports increasing child allowance, while in October 2024 they submitted a Law on Stolen Babies. They also support the reform of the pension system. Regarding Belgrade, they oppose the demolition of Belgrade Fair.

SRCE supports the accession of Serbia to the European Union. Regarding the Russian invasion of Ukraine, it supports "stepping away from what Russia is doing" (mora i da se odmakne od onoga što Rusija radi). Ponoš has, however, accused Ukraine of trying to involve NATO into the war.

== Organisation ==
SRCE was led by its founder Ponoš, who was elected at its assembly in October 2023 and re-elected in October 2025. He resigned on 3 November 2026, and the party has since been led by its Presidency and Executive Board pending the election of a new president. Mihailo Brkić, Slobodan Cvejić, and Tatjana Marković Topalović serve as vice-presidents. Two other vice-presidents elected in 2025 have since left: Slobodan Petrović left the party in September 2026 and was later expelled, while Duško Lopandić resigned from all party functions in October 2026. Its headquarters is at Stojana Protića 48, Belgrade. Ponoš served as the president of its parliamentary group in the National Assembly.

Ponoš announced in March 2023 that SRCE would begin collecting signatures to register as a political party. In June 2023, SRCE announced that they had collected 10,000 signatures that are needed for the registration. On 12 July 2023, it was registered as political party.

=== List of presidents ===
#	President		Birth–Death	Term start	Term end
1	Zdravko Ponoš	An image of Zdravko Ponoš in 2022	1962–	26 June 2022	3 November 2026

== Electoral performance ==
=== Parliamentary elections ===
National Assembly of Serbia
Year	Leader	Popular vote	% of popular vote	#	# of seats	Seat change	Coalition	Status	Ref.
2023	Zdravko Ponoš	902,450	24.32%	▲2nd	9 / 250	▲9	SPN	Opposition	
2026	Zdravko Ponoš	12,570	0.29%	▼10th	0 / 250	▼9	ES	Extra-parliamentary	

=== Provincial elections ===
Assembly of Vojvodina
Year	Leader	Popular vote	% of popular vote	#	# of seats	Seat change	Coalition	Status	Ref.
2023	Zdravko Ponoš	215,197	22.55%	▲2nd	4 / 120	▲4	SPN	Opposition	

=== Belgrade City Assembly elections ===
City Assembly of Belgrade
Year	Leader	Popular vote	% of popular vote	#	# of seats	Seat change	Coalition	Status	Ref.
2023	Zdravko Ponoš	325,429	35.39%	▲2nd	4 / 110	▲4	SPN	Snap election	
2024	Zdravko Ponoš	Election boycott			0 / 110	▼4	–	Extra-parliamentary	–
