= Milan Mojsilović =

Serbian military officer (born 1967)

- Милан Мојсиловић
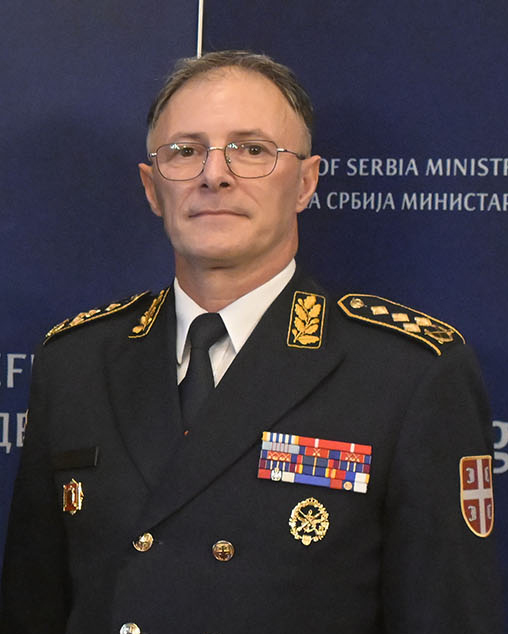
- General Milan Mojsilović in 2025
- Born: 3 August 1967 (age 59); Kosovska Mitrovica, SFR Yugoslavia
- Children: 1
- Military career
- Allegiance: SFR Yugoslavia; FR Yugoslavia; Serbia and Montenegro; Serbia
- Branch: Serbian Army
- Service years: 1991–2026
- Rank: General
- Unit: Serbian Armed Forces General Staff
- Conflicts: Croatian War of Independence; Kosovo War

Milan Mojsilović (Serbian Cyrillic: Милан Мојсиловић; born 3 August 1967) was the Chief of General Staff of the Serbian Armed Forces from 14 September 2018 to 16 November 2026.

== Military career ==
Mojsilović was born in Kosovska Mitrovica, SFR Yugoslavia, on 3 August 1967. He graduated from the Military Academy in 1991, and later from the Staff Command College and School of National Defense in 1998 and 2006, respectively. Among the more important international courses, he attended the executive program which lasted for four months at the European College for Security Studies.

After the start of the war in Croatia, Milan Mojsilović took part in fighting in the Banija region and remained stationed in the vicinity of the city of Petrinja as the commander of a tank platoon until the spring of the following year. In March and April 1992 his tank unit again saw action in the Posavina region and the city of Derventa, where his armored vehicle was hit twice by the Croatian units stationed there. After JNA troops left Bosnia and Hercegovina in May 1992, he took up new duties in the units stationed in Serbia. Upon the commencement of the Kosovo war in March 1999 he was transferred to the 243. mechanized brigade in Uroševac, where he fought and served as the chief operations officer.

After the Yugoslav wars, he was the Chief Operating Officer of the Serbian Armed Forces Operations Command, Deputy Commander of the Joint Operational Command in the General Staff and the Commander of the Land Army.

From October 2013 until October 2014, in addition to the duty of the Head of the Military Representative in the Mission of the Republic of Serbia to NATO, he served as Chair of the International Advisory Group at the Center for Security Cooperation "RACVIAC". From 2013 to 2017, he served as the Head of the Military Representation in the Mission of the Republic of Serbia to NATO in Brussels.

From March 2017 to September 2018, he served as acting Assistant Defense Minister for defense policy.

On 14 September 2018, he was appointed by the President of Serbia Aleksandar Vučić as the Chief of General Staff of the Serbian Armed Forces, following the retirement of Ljubiša Diković. He retired on 16 November 2026. He was succeed by his deputy Lt. Colonel General Tiosav Janković.

Military offices
Preceded by Ljubiša Diković	Chief of the General Staff of the Serbian Armed Forces; 14 September 2018 – 16 November 2026	Succeeded by Tiosav Janković
