= Zdravko Ponoš =

Serbian politician (born 1962)

Lieutenant Colonel General Zdravko Ponoš
- Здравко Понош
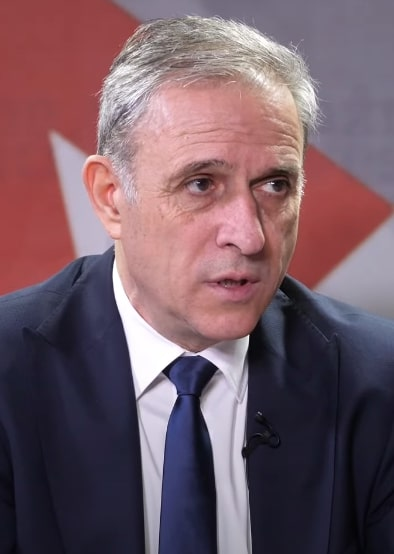
- Ponoš in 2022

President of Serbia Centre
- Incumbent
- Assumed office 26 June 2022
- Preceded by: Party established

Member of the National Assembly
- Incumbent
- Assumed office 6 February 2024

Chief of the Serbian General Staff
- In office 13 December 2006 – 30 December 2008
- President: Boris Tadić
- Preceded by: Ljubiša Jokić
- Succeeded by: Miloje Miletić

Personal details
- Born: 3 November 1962 (age 63) Knin, PR Croatia, FPR Yugoslavia
- Citizenship: Serbian; Croatian
- Party: Narodna (2017–2022); SRCE (2022–present)
- Spouse: Zdenka Ponoš (m. 1986)
- Children: 1
- Education: Military Technical Academy; University of Belgrade; Royal College of Defence Studies
- Occupation: Politician; diplomat; general; author
- Profession: Electrical engineer
- Website: zdravkoponos.rs

Military service
- Allegiance: SFR Yugoslavia; FR Yugoslavia; Serbia
- Branch/service: Yugoslav Ground Forces; Yugoslav Army; Serbian Army
- Years of service: 1986–2009
- Rank: Lt. Col. General
- Commands: Chief of the General Staff (2006–2008)
- Battles/wars: Kosovo War: NATO bombing of Yugoslavia
- Awards: Order of Merit in the Field of Defense and Security

Zdravko Ponoš (Serbian Cyrillic: Здравко Понош; born 3 November 1962) is a Serbian politician, former diplomat, and retired lieutenant colonel general who served as chief of the General Staff of the Serbian Armed Forces from 2006 to 2008.

Born in Golubić, a village near Knin, Ponoš later moved to Zagreb, where he spent most of his youth and obtained a degree in electronic engineering. Ponoš moved to Serbia in 1986, where he began his military career. Two years later, he obtained a job at the Department of Development and Equipment in Belgrade, where he worked until 2002. Ponoš then acquired a position at the Ministry of Defense, where he served as an advisor to multiple ministers, including future president Boris Tadić. In 2005, he was promoted to the rank of major general after having served as a colonel since 2000, and also became deputy chief of the General Army. A year later, Tadić promoted him to become the chief of the General Staff of the Serbian Armed Forces. As chief of the General Staff, Ponoš worked on army reforms and professionalisation, though this process stagnated in late 2008 due to a conflict with defense minister Dragan Šutanovac, which led to his dismissal in December 2008. Ponoš was retired as an army officer a year later.

After leaving the military, Ponoš worked as a diplomatic assistant to foreign affairs minister Vuk Jeremić, whom he previously worked with in the Serbian government. Their cooperation continued after 2012, and Ponoš served as chief of Jeremić's cabinet during his mandate as president of the UN General Assembly. After returning from the United States, they formed the Center for International Cooperation and Sustainable Development, with Ponoš initially serving as executive director and later as a senior advisor.

Ponoš entered politics in 2017 after participating in Jeremić's campaign team during the presidential election, and later that year, they founded the People's Party. He was a vice-president of the party until November 2021 and was the nominee of the United for the Victory of Serbia coalition in the 2022 Serbian presidential election, in which he placed second. He left the People's Party after the election and formed the Serbia Centre organisation in July 2022, which became a registered party a year later. He was elected to the National Assembly in the 2023 election. A centrist politician, he is in favour of the accession of Serbia to the European Union and military cooperation with NATO. He also criticised Aleksandar Vučić and the government's approach towards foreign relations and military.

== Early life and education ==
Zdravko Ponoš was born on 3 November 1962 in Golubić, a village near Knin, in the PR Croatia, Federal People's Republic of Yugoslavia. He comes from a Serb family. He finished elementary school in Golubić and moved to Zagreb in his youth, where he finished secondary technical school and attended land forces high school. He decided to continue with military school, later stating that "it was something completely new and unknown". Ponoš enrolled in a technical military academy in Zagreb, where he obtained a degree in electronic engineering in 1986. He finished his postgraduate studies in 1999 at the University of Belgrade's Faculty of Electrical Engineering, with a master's degree in Global Navigation Systems. During his time at the University of Belgrade, he published his work regarding Global Navigation Systems in a notable Japanese magazine. He attended the Royal College of Defense Studies in London and also completed courses in Switzerland and Germany. He had also completed STANAG 6001, a NATO course.

== Military career ==
=== 1980s–1990s ===
Ponoš's military career began in 1986. After finishing military academy in Zagreb, he was offered a position there as an assistant, but he rejected the offer, instead choosing to work at the Military Technical Institute in Belgrade. Ponoš was stationed in Užice and SAP Kosovo. During that time, he worked on jamming TV Tirana broadcasts in Kosovo, later stating that "the job was rather futile, but the army did not assign those tasks themselves". He was stationed in Kosovo until 1988, when he decided to move back to Belgrade to work at the Department of Development and Equipment. He described his job as "interesting", and that it was mainly concentrated on intensive contacts with civic institutes and companies. By the 1990s, he had already moved to Serbia, and during the beginning of the break-up of Yugoslavia, he thought of leaving the country, but ended up staying. During the NATO bombing of Yugoslavia in 1999, he and his team used methods of detecting aircraft flying overhead to prevent greater losses, especially in AP Kosovo and Metohija. He described it as "the brightest phase of our work". Following the bombing, Ponoš was awarded the Order of Merit in the Field of Defense and Security by Yugoslav president Slobodan Milošević.

=== 2000s ===
Ponoš was promoted to colonel in 2000 and five years later he became a major general. He experienced polarisation in the army during the overthrow of Slobodan Milošević, stating that "effective changes did not occur in the army after the 5 October revolution". He worked at the department until 2002, and shortly after he began working at the defense ministry. He had served as an advisor to Boris Tadić while he was the head of the defence ministry. During his time at the defence ministry, he was offered to form a "cooperation department with NATO" which he accepted. He described his time under Tadić as "a successful collaboration". Ponoš remained in that position until 2004, when he was appointed as chief of the directorate. In 2005, he became the deputy chief of the army. As deputy chief, he was primarily orientated towards army reform and professionalisation, and after the dissolution of Serbia and Montenegro in 2006, he joined the team led by minister Zoran Stanković to continue the reforms. At that time, he was one of the youngest members of the general staff.

=== Chief of the General Staff (2006–2008) ===
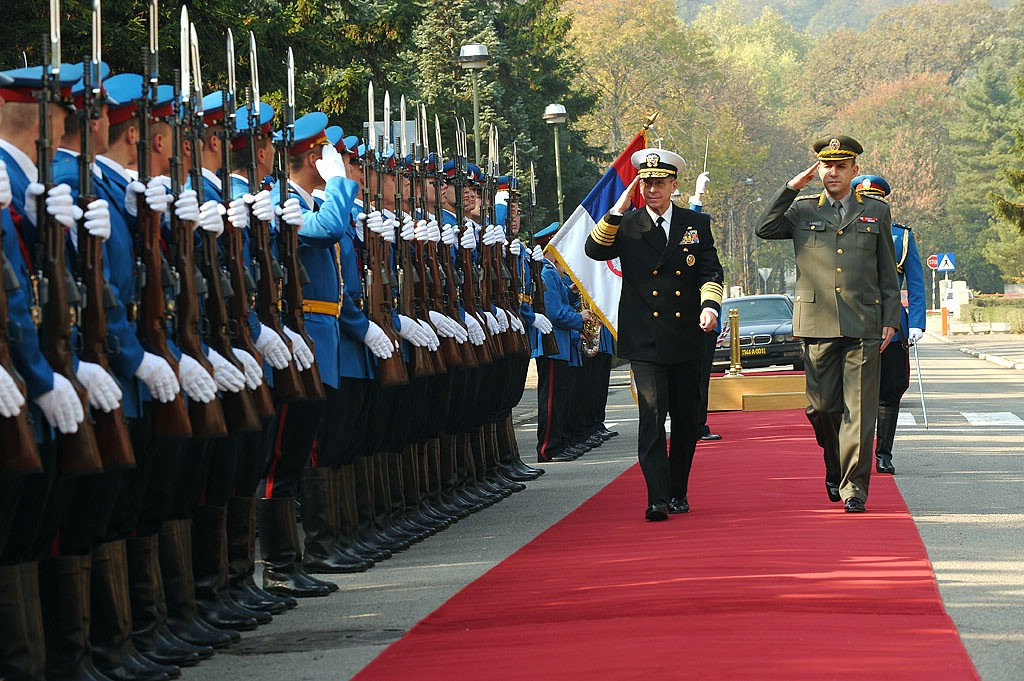
U.S Navy Admiral Michael Mullen (left) and Ponoš (right) in 2007

Ponoš was appointed by Tadić, by then president of Serbia, as the chief of the General Staff on 13 December 2006. He was also promoted to the rank of lieutenant general. His appointment was described by academics as "a package for faster access to European integration" due to his status as a pro-Western general. As chief of the general staff, he continued his support for army reform and professionalisation, and also stated his support for higher salaries for army officers and for army cooperation with neighbouring countries, European Union and NATO.

During his first week as chief of the general staff, he represented Serbia during the opening of the NATO liaison office in Serbia. Dragan Šutanovac replaced Stanković as defence minister in May 2007. Four days later, Ponoš travelled to the United States where he met with the US chief of staff. Ponoš commented in October that "the army would not protect war criminals that were convicted by ICTY". Later in December, Ponoš and Šutanovac stayed for several days near administrative lines with Kosovo to observe the situation, which they later stated to be "peaceful" and that "destabilization in this part of Serbia would not be expected to occur". In October 2008, he met with army representatives of Turkey and Norway. A month later, he expressed his support to change the Kumanovo Agreement.

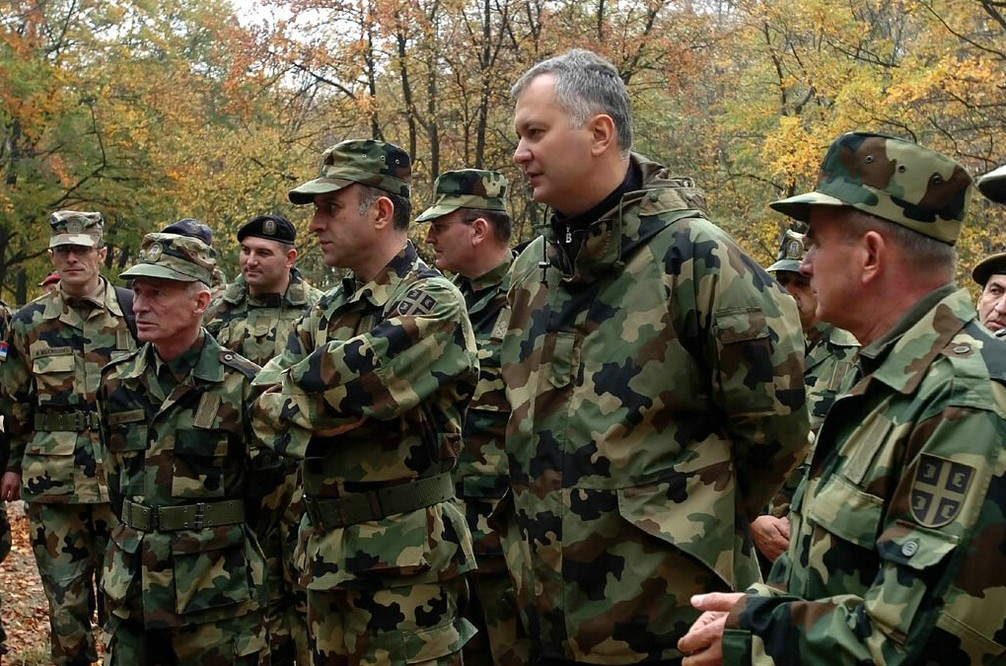
Ponoš and Šutanovac in 2008

A conflict between Ponoš and Šutanovac became public after Ponoš stated in an interview that reforms were allegedly stopped by the ministry, and that Šutanovac allegedly violated military's autonomy. Shortly after, Tadić stated that "the defense system is stable" during an interview. Tadić then decided to side with Šutanovac in this conflict, and he dismissed Ponoš on 30 December, after alleging that he had violating military rules. Ponoš was previously called by conservative politicians to resign due to his reforms and pro-Western views. This had sparked media attention in April 2007. Radio Free Europe journalist Branka Mihajlović had considered the conflict to be a "political showdown within the Democratic Party".

Under Ponoš, the Ohio Army National Guard and Serbia cooperated and engaged in military drills under the auspices of the US State Partnership Program; the program was implemented in September 2007, shortly before his appointment as chief of the General Staff. Ponoš declassified parts of the transcripts from the sessions of the collegium of the chief of the General Staff revealing that Slobodan Milošević and later, to a lesser extent, Vojislav Koštunica, planned to use the army for political purposes, especially in Montenegro. During his time as chief of the General Staff, the army held highest approval ratings according to the Serbian public. He was succeeded by Miloje Miletić in February 2009.

=== Retirement ===
After his dismissal as chief of the General Staff, Ponoš stayed in the army for another year, although unallocated. Ponoš expressed a wish to become an assistant for Vuk Jeremić's foreign affairs ministry, although Šutanovac stated that "he does not intend to propose his retirement to Tadić" and he suggested Ponoš should resign from his position in the defence ministry. He was retired by president Tadić on 31 December 2009.

== Political career ==
=== Early period ===
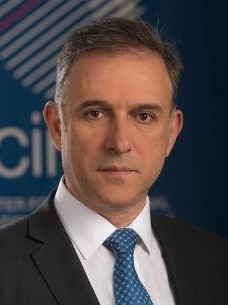
Ponoš in 2014

His interest into politics developed while he was reading the newspaper Borba, and during his time at the army in the 1990s, he opposed the regime of Slobodan Milošević. He met Tadić during the early 2000s, with whom he had a discussion regarding the army during their first encounter. During the campaign period for the 2008 elections, Ponoš stated that "frequent elections do not negatively affect army reforms".

Shortly after his retirement from the military, he became an assistant to Jeremić. Ponoš previously cooperated with Jeremić during the early 2000s while Jeremić served as an advisor to Tadić. In April 2010, he was a part of the delegation that confirmed the friendship with Libya. Ponoš opened an exhibition in June 2011 to promote the history of diplomatic relations between France and Serbia. He continued to work for Jeremić after the change of government in 2012. He later became the chief of Jeremić's cabinet while he was the president of the 67th session of the UN General Assembly. During that time, he resided in New York City. After coming back to Belgrade, Ponoš and Jeremić founded the Center for International Cooperation and Sustainable Development (CIRSD). Ponoš held the position of executive director, while Jeremić was elected as president. He later served as senior advisor.

=== Contemporary career ===
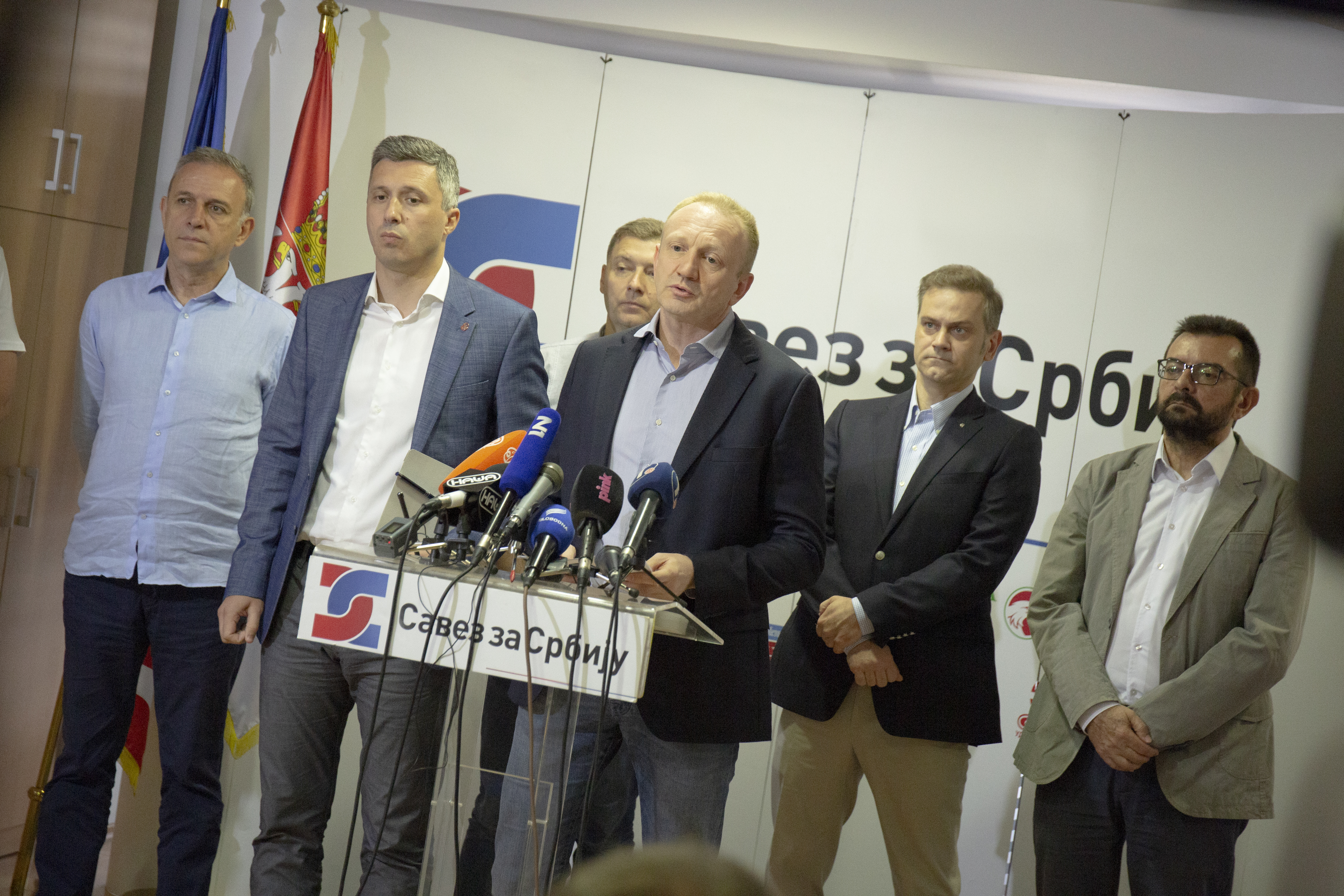
Ponoš with the leaders of the Alliance for Serbia in 2019

After his army and diplomatic careers, Ponoš entered politics in 2017, and participated in Jeremić's campaign team during the 2017 presidential election. Jeremić placed fourth, winning 5.65% of the popular vote. Later that year in October, he participated in the foundation of the People's Party. He was elected as vice-president at the first party conference.

Ponoš supported the formation of a wider coalition for the 2018 Belgrade City Assembly election that would be composed of opposition parties. He appeared on the ballot list, which ended up winning 19% of the popular vote. Later that year, he supported the appointment of Milan Mojsilović as chief of the General Staff. He was also one of the representatives of the opposition during the protests in 2018 and 2019. In July 2019, he stated his opposition to participating in the 2020 parliamentary election, and called for other parties to boycott. This move was later adopted by the Alliance for Serbia, which his party was a part of. He also called for citizens to boycott the parliamentary election. Ponoš was re-elected as vice-president of the People's Party in November 2019. At a party conference in the same month, Ponoš was chosen as the ballot representative for the upcoming Belgrade City Assembly election, although Ponoš later rejected the offer. After boycotting the 2020 election, Ponoš announced that "opposition parties will exert pressure to the government in order to hold the future election under fair conditions". In early 2021, he expressed his support for a joint participation in the 2022 general election and for a joint opposition presidential candidate. Ponoš was also one of the participants of the inter-party dialogues on electoral conditions that took place during 2021. Ponoš stepped down as vice-president of the People's Party at its party conference in November 2021.

=== 2022 election ===
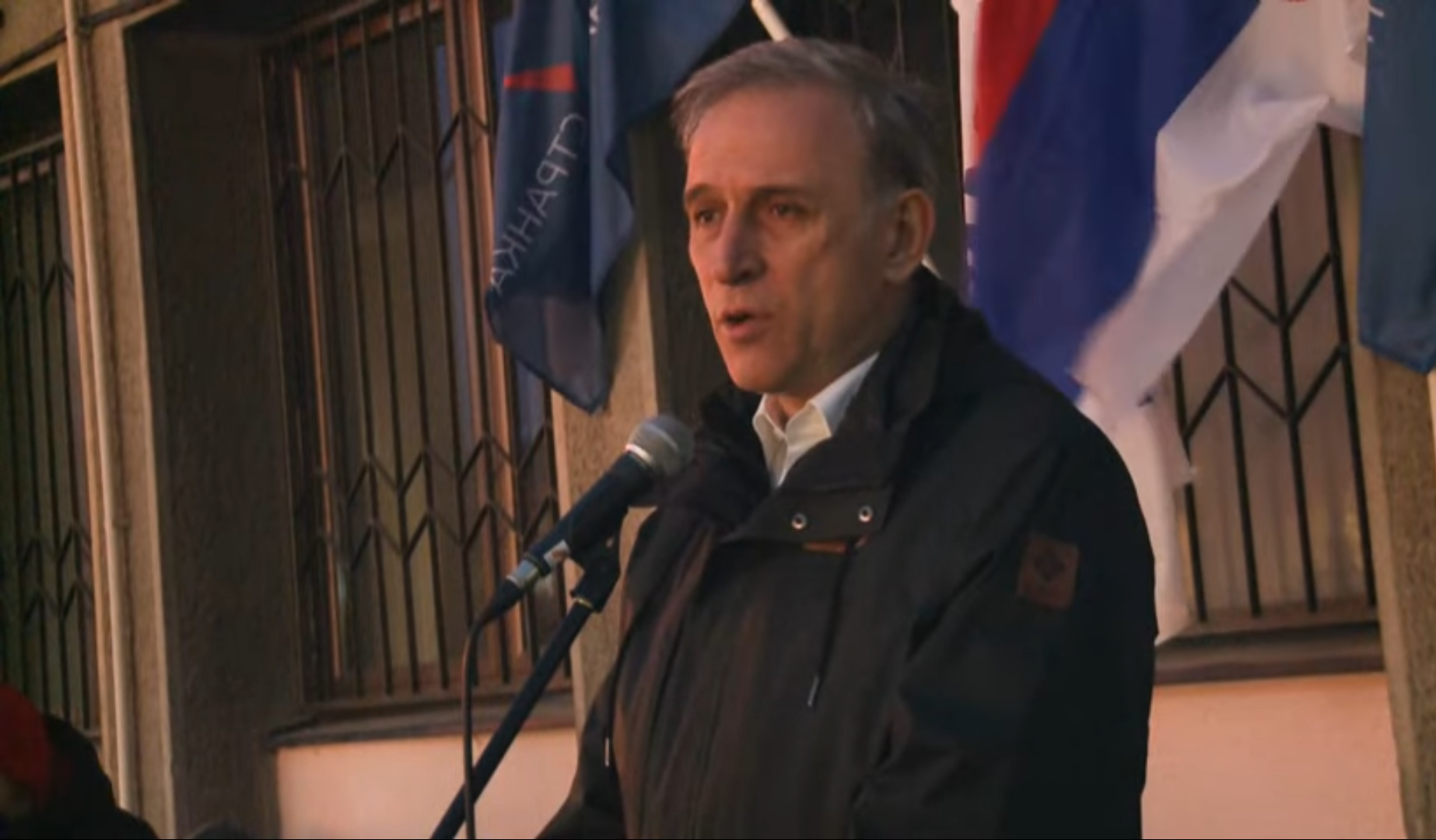
Ponoš during a campaign rally in March 2022

Ponoš stated in early November 2021 that he would run for the presidency if "opposition parties unite themselves at all levels". Jeremić stated that he was surprised by this move, and also stated that the candidate should rather be reached by consensus between opposition parties. Sanda Rašković Ivić, one of the vice-presidents of the People's Party, condemned the attacks that were done by pro-government media and MPs on Ponoš. On 22 January, the Party of Freedom and Justice proposed Ponoš as a joint opposition candidate, while Jeremić stated that his party was ready to back him up. Leaders of the coalition held discussions on 28 and 29 January, after which they concluded their support for Ponoš as presidential candidate. On 2 February, Ponoš was presented as the presidential candidate of the United for the Victory of Serbia coalition. His candidacy was confirmed by the Republic Electoral Commission (RIK) on 6 March. Beginning in February, Ponoš had announced his advisors who would cooperate with him if he were to get elected president. During his campaign, Ponoš held rallies in cities and towns across Serbia. He placed second in the presidential election after winning 18% of the popular vote. Ponoš has been a target of attacks by the pro-government media from 2021 and during the 2022 campaign period.

=== Post-election career ===
Following his election loss, Ponoš left the People's Party. On 16 June 2022, he announced that he would form a political organisation that would be orientated towards pro-Europeanism. In July, Ponoš had announced that the organisation would be named Serbia Centre (SRCE). As the president of SRCE, Ponoš criticised President Aleksandar Vučić's approach towards foreign policy, most notably regarding the European Union and Russian invasion of Ukraine. Its leadership was elected in December 2022, with Ponoš officially serving as its president. In March 2023, Ponoš announced that Serbia Centre would begin collecting signatures to register as a political party. SRCE was registered as a political party in July 2023. In the 2023 Serbian parliamentary election, Ponoš was placed 10th on the Serbia Against Violence electoral list. SPN won 65 seats in the National Assembly and thus Ponoš was successfully elected.

== Political positions ==
Ponoš is a self-described centrist, and has stated that his views combine both the centre-left and centre-right. The Associated Press has described him as a centrist. Observers have described his views as reformist, and moderate conservative. He opposes the rule of the Serbian Progressive Party, and has accused Aleksandar Vučić of working "in his self-interests". Ponoš has compared Vučić with Augusto Pinochet and has accused him of "humiliating the state and the army".

=== Domestic policies ===
Ponoš has described his political views as a mix of civic and national issues, and has stated his support for constitutionalism, and social justice. He has also stated that "civil partnerships should not be called same-sex marriage" and had assessed that "people who live in such a community should receive same rights as everyone else", but he had also emphasised that he is against LGBT adoption. He supports the change of the presidential electoral system to a system in which the president would be elected in a secret vote by the National Assembly. Ponoš had stated that, if elected president, he would sign a law that would return confiscated pensions, which was done by the Vučić-led government in 2014.

Regarding his views on the army, Ponoš criticised the law on the army which was adopted in 2018, and stated that "the law was made to satisfy the interests of arms dealers and brokers". He has also argued that "instead of introducing mandatory conscriptions, they should raise salaries for officers in the army", and has accused the government of abusing the police during electoral campaigns. Ponoš has called for the military leadership to resist the use of the army for political purposes, and has accused the government of being made up of "incompetent politicians are playing with the defense system".

=== Foreign policies ===
Ponoš is in favour of accession of Serbia to the European Union, and during the 2022 campaign period, Ponoš described himself as a "pro-European candidate". He is also supportive of Serbia's membership in the Partnership for Peace and its cooperation with NATO, but is opposed to Serbia joining the military alliance. In 2006, he stated that "the Serbian army should focus on modernization in order to reach the standards of EU and NATO" and that the question regarding NATO should be decided via referendum. In 2017, he stated that Serbia's entry into NATO would be an "irrational and emotionally unacceptable move for generations surviving the trauma of the bombing", and that Serbia should remain militarily neutral. He had accused Aleksandar Vulin of not respecting military neutrality.

He had previously supported the so-called "four pillars" of Serbian foreign policy, in which he also included European integration, Kosovo, and regional cooperation; the "four pillars" of Serbian foreign policy, a term coined by former president Tadić, included free trade agreements with the European Union, Russia, United States, and China. Ponoš stated his opposition to the Russian invasion of Ukraine that began on 24 February 2022. In June, Ponoš stated his support for sanctioning Russia due to its invasion of Ukraine.

=== Kosovo question ===
Ponoš is against the recognition of independence of Kosovo, claiming that the recognition of Kosovo is something that "no democratic government in Serbia can accept" and that the solution for this question will not be brought by the people who incited hatred and war. He has also stated that "it is important that things do not go in the wrong situation, and to slowly normalize life and build trust". He has also stated that "Kosovo is a problem that must be solved...so that any solution is in favor of the citizens who live there". He had also expressed his support for "solving the Kosovo issue", instead of leaving it "frozen and remain as it is". He has criticised the Serb List and Vučić's approach towards Kosovo.

=== Srebrenica massacre and Ratko Mladić ===
During an interview in February 2022, Ponoš stated that he once met Ratko Mladić in Knin. Talking about Mladić's involvement in the Srebrenica massacre, Ponoš stated that Mladić's troops "committed brutal crimes" and that "he was responsible for those crimes, but the whole generation or the whole nation should not be responsible for that". He has also stated that he supports the Srebrenica Declaration, which was adopted by the National Assembly in 2010. Ponoš was criticised by the pro-government media in Serbia over his comments.

== Personal life ==
During his youth, Ponoš resided in Zagreb and later married Zdenka, a Croat woman from Inđija. He has one brother, while his father died shortly before Operation Storm. His maternal grandfather was mobilised by the Yugoslav Partisans and died in combat at the Syrmian Front. He also holds Croatian citizenship. Besides his native Serbian, he also speaks English and Russian. His hobbies include studying history, music, films, football, and cartoons; Ponoš is a fan of The Simpsons animated sitcom. Ponoš is also an author of several academic papers, and he served as a supervisory editor of the journal Horizons. The weekly Vremе news magazine named Ponoš as the person of the year in 2006.

Ponoš tested positive for COVID-19 on 29 March 2020, and was subsequently sent for treatment to the Infectious Diseases Clinic in Belgrade. By 13 April, he tested negative.

== Bibliography ==
- Ponoš, Zdravko; Šunjevarić, Milan (1993). "Satelitski telekomunikacioni sistemi u vojnoj primeni" [Satellite Telecommunication Systems in Military Application]. Vojnotehnički glasnik (in Serbian). Vol. 41. Belgrade: University of Defense in Belgrade. pp. 682–697. eISSN 2217-4753. ISSN 0042-8469.
- ––––––––––––– (2007). "Transformacija vojske Srbije - izazovi i odgovori" [Transformation of the Serbian Army - Challenges and Responses]. Vojno delo (in Serbian). Vol. 5. Belgrade: Ministry of Defense of the Republic of Serbia, University of Defense in Belgrade. pp. 9–30. eISSN 2683-5703. ISSN 0042-8426.

Military offices
Preceded by Ljubiša Jokić as Chief of the General Staff of Serbia and Montenegro Armed Forces	Chief of the Serbian General Staff; 2006–2008	Succeeded by Miloje Miletić
