= People's Movement of Serbia =

Political party in Serbia

People's Movement of Serbia Народни покрет Србије
- Abbreviation: NPS
- President: Miroslav Aleksić
- Vice-Presidents: Borislav Novaković; Đorđe Stanković; Uroš Đokić; Ivana Rokvić; Ana Jakovljević; Miloš Pavlović
- Founded: 22 August 2014 (first); 6 August 2023 (second)
- Dissolved: 22 October 2017 (first)
- Split from: United Regions of Serbia (first); People's Party (second)
- Succeeded by: People's Party (first)
- Ideology: Anti-corruption; Conservatism
- Political position: Centre-right
- Colours: Blue
- National Assembly: 0 / 250
- Assembly of Vojvodina: 5 / 120
- City Assembly of Belgrade: 3 / 110

Website
- nps.org.rs

The People's Movement of Serbia (Serbian: Народни покрет Србије, romanised: Narodni pokret Srbije, abbr. NPS) is a centre-right political party in Serbia. Miroslav Aleksić has been the party's president since its reformation in August 2023. Ahead of the 2026 Serbian parliamentary election, NPS led the "People's Serbia" coalition, which withdrew its list in favour of the Student List.

NPS previously existed from 2014 to 2017 and was also led by Aleksić, who was its only member in the National Assembly of Serbia. In October 2017, Aleksić allowed the party to be registered again as the People's Party under the leadership of Vuk Jeremić.

== History ==
=== 2014–2017 ===
Logo of the first iteration of the People's Movement of Serbia (2015–2017)

Miroslav Aleksić became mayor of Trstenik in 2012 as a member of the United Regions of Serbia (Serbian: Ujedinjeni regioni Srbije, URS). The URS largely became dormant after the 2014 Serbian parliamentary election, and Aleksić left the party later in the year and became acting leader of a breakaway group initially called the People's Party of Serbia (Serbian: Narodna stranka Srbije, NSS). The group was formally constituted as the People's Movement of Serbia in January 2015, and Aleksić was chosen as its leader in February.

The party contested the 2016 parliamentary election as part of the Alliance for a Better Serbia list led by Boris Tadić, Čedomir Jovanović and Nenad Čanak. Aleksić received the eighth position on the electoral list and was elected when the alliance won thirteen mandates.

The People's Movement of Serbia operated in a parliamentary alliance with Tadić's Social Democratic Party, which also contested the 2016 elections in the Alliance for a Better Serbia. Aleksić served as the parliamentary group's deputy leader. Both the alliance with the Social Democratic Party and Aleksić's deputy leadership of the parliamentary group continued after the party was restructured as the People's Party.

=== 2023–present ===
NPS was reconstituted on 6 August 2023 after Aleksić left the People's Party. Alongside Aleksić, members of the National Assembly Slavica Radovanović, Borislav Novaković, and Đorđe Stanković, and councillors in the City Assembly of Belgrade joined the party. Aleksić announced that the party would begin collecting signatures to again become a registered political party. On 25 August, Aleksić announced that they collected over 10,000 signatures. The party was subsequently registered in October 2023.

NPS became part of the Serbia Against Violence (SPN) coalition in October 2023, a coalition of political parties organising the 2023 protests. In the parliamentary election held that December, SPN won 65 seats, ten of which went to NPS.

Ahead of the 2026 Serbian parliamentary election, NPS formed the "People's Serbia" (Narodna Srbija) coalition with New Face of Serbia (NLS) and Ecological Uprising (EU). On 15 September 2026, the coalition announced that it would not field candidates and would instead back the Student List; out of respect for the activists who had collected them, it submitted the signatures gathered for its list, which was proclaimed and then withdrawn. According to Vreme, NPS had initially wanted to run but gave up after its partners decided to withdraw. Aleksić described the withdrawal as a sign that the coalition was "ready to make a sacrifice", saying that no poll had placed it below the threshold. The election, held on 25 October 2026, was won by the Student List with 140 of the 250 seats.

== Ideology and platform ==
The NPS has been described as an anti-corruption, conservative, and centre-right political party.

== Election results ==
=== Parliamentary elections ===
National Assembly of Serbia
Year	Leader	Popular vote	% of popular vote	#	# of seats	Seat change	Coalition	Status	Ref.
2016	Miroslav Aleksić	189,564	5.17%	▲7th	1 / 250	▲1	NPS–SDS–LDP–LSV	Opposition	
2023	Miroslav Aleksić	902,450	24.32%	▲2nd	10 / 250	▲8	SPN	Opposition	
2026	Miroslav Aleksić	Did not participate			0 / 250	▼10	Supported SL	Extra-parliamentary	
