= Miroslav Aleksić (born 1978) =

Serbian politician

- Мирослав Алексић
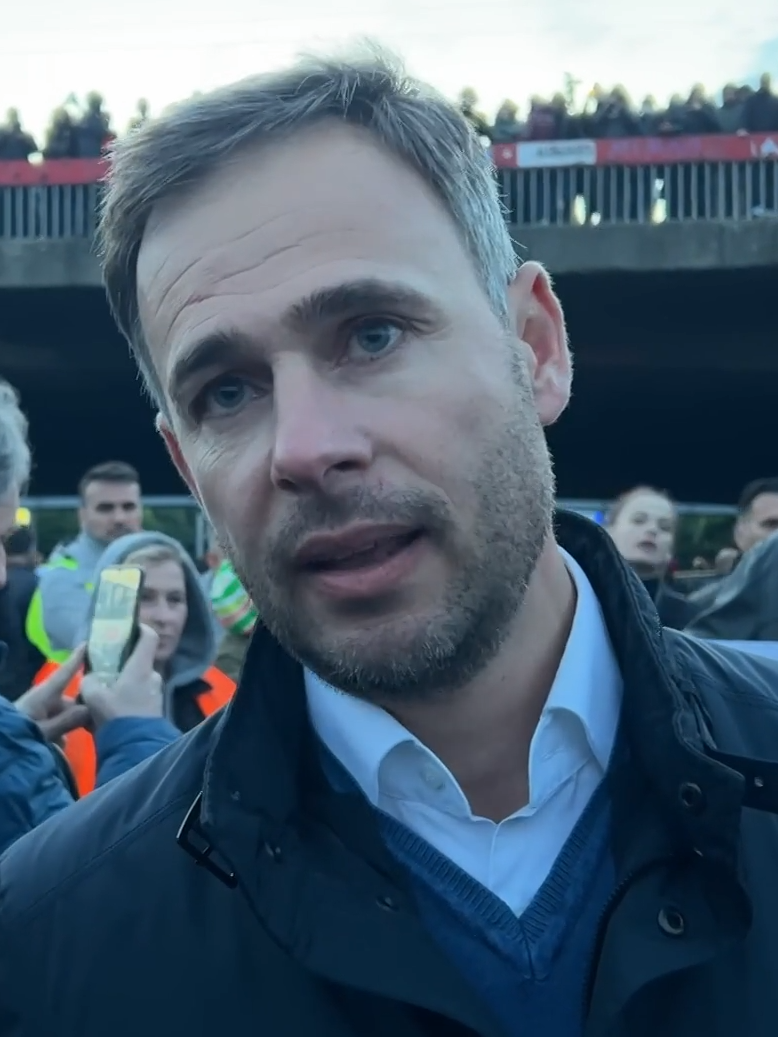
- Aleksić in 2023

Member of the National Assembly
- Incumbent
- Assumed office 1 August 2022
- In office 3 June 2016 – 3 August 2020

Leader of the People's Movement of Serbia
- Incumbent
- Assumed office 12 November 2023
- Preceded by: position established
- In office 8 February 2015 – 22 October 2017
- Preceded by: position established
- Succeeded by: Vuk Jeremić (as leader of the People's Party)

Mayor of Trstenik
- In office 6 July 2012 – 24 June 2016
- Preceded by: Stevan Đaković
- Succeeded by: Aleksandar Ćirić

Personal details
- Born: 6 August 1978 (age 48) Kruševac, SR Serbia, SFR Yugoslavia
- Party: URS (2010–14); NSS/NPS (2014–17); Narodna (2017–23); NPS (2023–present)
- Education: Higher Business School; University of Priština; Faculty of Law for Commerce and Judiciary

Miroslav Aleksić (Serbian Cyrillic: Мирослав Алексић; born 6 August 1978) is a Serbian politician. He is the president of the People's Movement of Serbia (NPS) and a prominent opponent of Serbian president Aleksandar Vučić and the governing Serbian Progressive Party (SNS).

Aleksić was the mayor of Trstenik from 2012 to 2016 and is currently serving his third term in the National Assembly of Serbia. Formerly a member of the United Regions of Serbia (URS), he founded the People's Movement of Serbia for the first time in 2015 and was its leader until 2017, when the party was restructured as the People's Party (Narodna) under Vuk Jeremić's leadership. Aleksić was a deputy president of Narodna from 2017 to 2023, when he split with Jeremić and re-established the NPS as a separate organization.

== Early life and private career ==
Aleksić was born on 6 August 1978 in Kruševac, in what was then the Socialist Republic of Serbia in the Socialist Federal Republic of Yugoslavia. He finished elementary and electrical engineering high school in Trstenik and graduated from the higher business school in Belgrade in 2000, specialising in taxes and customs. In 2010, he received a degree from the Faculty of Economics at the University of Priština in Kosovska Mitrovica (North Mitrovica). Four years later, he completed a master's degree in economics and law from the Faculty of Law for Commerce and Judiciary in Novi Sad.

Aleksić's family has been involved in agricultural production for several decades, and as a teenager he worked with his family in cultivating vegetables. From 2008 to 2015, he was the owner of a company that operated a gas station in Trstenik in partnership with the oil company OMV. He led the directorate of the planning and construction company Trstenik from 2008 to 2012.

== Politician ==
=== Mayor of Trstenik (2012–16) ===
Aleksić began his political career as a member of the United Regions of Serbia, serving as president of its Trstenik municipal board in the early 2010s. He appeared in the lead position on the party's electoral list for the Trstenik municipal assembly in the 2012 Serbian local elections and was elected when the list won a plurality victory with eighteen out of forty-nine mandates. After the election, the URS formed a local coalition government with the Serbian Progressive Party (SNS), New Serbia (NS), the Socialist Party of Serbia (SPS), and the Party of United Pensioners of Serbia (PUPS). Aleksić was chosen as president of the municipality (i.e., mayor) and served in this role for the next four years. He issued a declaration in 2013 that genetically modified food would not be produced in the municipality, and he opposed nickel mining in the area on the grounds that it would jeopardise several local villages.

Aleksić became a prominent URS spokesperson at the republic level early in his mayoralty. He was given the eleventh position on the party's list in the 2014 Serbian parliamentary election but was not elected when the list failed to cross the electoral threshold for assembly representation. The URS became dormant after the election, and Aleksić left the party later in the year to become acting president of a breakaway group called the People's Party of Serbia (NSS). The group formally constituted itself as the People's Movement of Serbia in January 2015, and Aleksić was chosen as its leader in February.

The New Democratic Party (NDS) joined Aleksić's governing coalition in Trstenik in mid-2014 and continued its affiliation after being renamed as the Social Democratic Party (SDS) later in the year. The Progressives, facing serious local divisions, left the coalition in June 2015.

The People's Movement of Serbia formed a political alliance with SDS in early 2016, and the party officially contested the that year's local elections in Trstenik under the SDS's banner. The NPS/SDS list narrowly lost the election to an alliance headed by the Progressive Party. The Progressives afterward formed a new administration with the Socialists and the Serbian Renewal Movement (SPO), and Aleksić's term as mayor came to an end. He served as an opposition member of the local assembly in the term that followed.

=== First term in the National Assembly (2016–20) ===
The Social Democratic Party contested the 2016 Serbian parliamentary election on a coalition list with the Liberal Democratic Party (LDP), and the League of Social Democrats of Vojvodina (LSV), and some SDS list positions were reserved for NPS candidates. Aleksić, as the NPS's leader, was given the eighth position and was elected when the list won thirteen seats; he was the only member of his party to receive a mandate. The Progressive Party and its allies won the election, and Aleksić served in opposition as deputy leader of a SDS–NPS parliamentary group that had five members in total. He was also a member of the agriculture committee, (Note: Formally known as the Agriculture, Forestry, and Water Management Committee.) a deputy member of the committee on Kosovo and Metohija and the committee on the rights of the child, and a member of the parliamentary friendship groups with Austria, Belarus, China, Croatia, Germany, Italy, Poland, Romania, Russia, Slovenia, Switzerland, and the United States of America.

In October 2017, Aleksić allowed the People's Movement of Serbia to be re-registered as the People's Party under Vuk Jeremić's leadership. He was chosen as a vice-president of the reconstituted party at its founding convention in the same month.

=== Boycott and return to the assembly (2019–present) ===
During the 2016–20 parliament, various opposition parties accused Serbian president Aleksandar Vučić and Serbia's SNS-led administration of undermining the country's democratic institutions. Several parties, including the People's Party, began a policy of non-participation with state institutions, including the national assembly, in 2019 and ultimately boycotted the 2020 parliamentary election and the concurrent 2020 local elections. Aleksić was one of the most prominent opposition figures calling for a total election boycott in all jurisdictions and at all levels of government, rather than participating in what he considered a sham democracy. He also accused Vučić and the SNS of involvement with criminal networks in the country.

Serbia's opposition groups ended their boycott of the electoral process in 2022. The People's Party nominated Aleksić as its candidate in the 2022 Serbian presidential election, but he withdrew from the process to support Zdravko Ponoš as a united opposition candidate. He appeared in the third position on the coalition United for the Victory of Serbia list in the 2022 parliamentary election and was elected to a second term when the list won thirty-eight seats. The SNS and its allies won the election, and Aleksić initially led the People's Party assembly group in opposition. During his second term, he was a member of the defence and internal affairs committee, the agriculture committee, the finance committee, the administrative committee, (Note: Formally known as the Committee on Administrative, Budgetary, Mandate, and Immunity Issues.) and the European Union–Serbia stabilisation and association committee; a deputy member of the economy committee; (Note: Formally known as the Committee on the Economy, Regional Development, Trade, Tourism, and Energy.) and a member of the parliamentary friendship groups with Austria, Azerbaijan, Croatia, Germany, Israel, Japan, Kazakhstan, Montenegro, North Macedonia, Romania, and the United States of America.

In May 2023 he played a leading role in the mass Serbia Against Violence protests, which were triggered after the Belgrade school shooting and Mladenovac and Smederevo shootings.

Aleksić left the People's Party in August 2023 and re-established the People's Movement of Serbia. In an interview with Danas, he said that he did not regard Jeremić as his enemy on an individual level but that the People's Party had become autocratic, with no possibility of a change in leadership, and that he could better promote the cause of Serbia's opposition at the head of a different party. He described the revitalized NPS as a party of the pro-European and civil society right. He was formally elected as the party's leader in November 2023.

The NPS contested the 2023 Serbian parliamentary election as part of the Serbia Against Violence (SPN) coalition, and Aleksić and Marinika Tepić of the centre-left Party of Freedom and Justice (SSP) were designated as co-holders of the coalition's list. Both Aleksić and Tepić focused on anti-corruption issues during the campaign; on one occasion, Aleksić was quoted as saying, "We have to [...] introduce a functioning system of institutions, so that those who are responsible for looting the state, who generated crime and violence, who destroyed public companies and institutions, who brought ministers to learn the job, all these people will have to answer."

Aleksić appeared in the second position on the SPN's list and was re-elected when the list won sixty-five mandates. The SNS won a majority victory, and the NPS again serves in opposition. Aleksić is now the leader of the People's Movement of Serbia–New Face of Serbia assembly group and is a member of the defense and internal affairs committee, the finance committee, the agricultural committee, the administrative committee, and the stabilisation and association committee.

When Serbia's new ministry under Miloš Vučević's leadership was announced on 30 April 2024, Aleksić described it as "a government of political trade, extravagance and complete confusion without a shred of coherence," unnecessarily large and compromised by political flyovers.

== Political positions ==
=== Status of Kosovo ===
Aleksić is against the recognition of independence of Kosovo and has criticized Aleksandar Vučić's policies in relation to the disputed territory. He voiced his opposition to the Agreement on the path to normalisation between Kosovo and Serbia in 2023, claiming that Serbia was "not getting fast-track EU membership or anything" in return.

=== European Union ===
In November 2022, Aleksić called on the European Union to be "just as vocal on issues important to the lives of Serbian citizens, such as the fight against crime and corruption and freedom of the media, as it is when it points to the need to harmonize Serbia's foreign and security policy with the EU".
