= 2023 Serbian local elections =

- 17 December 2023
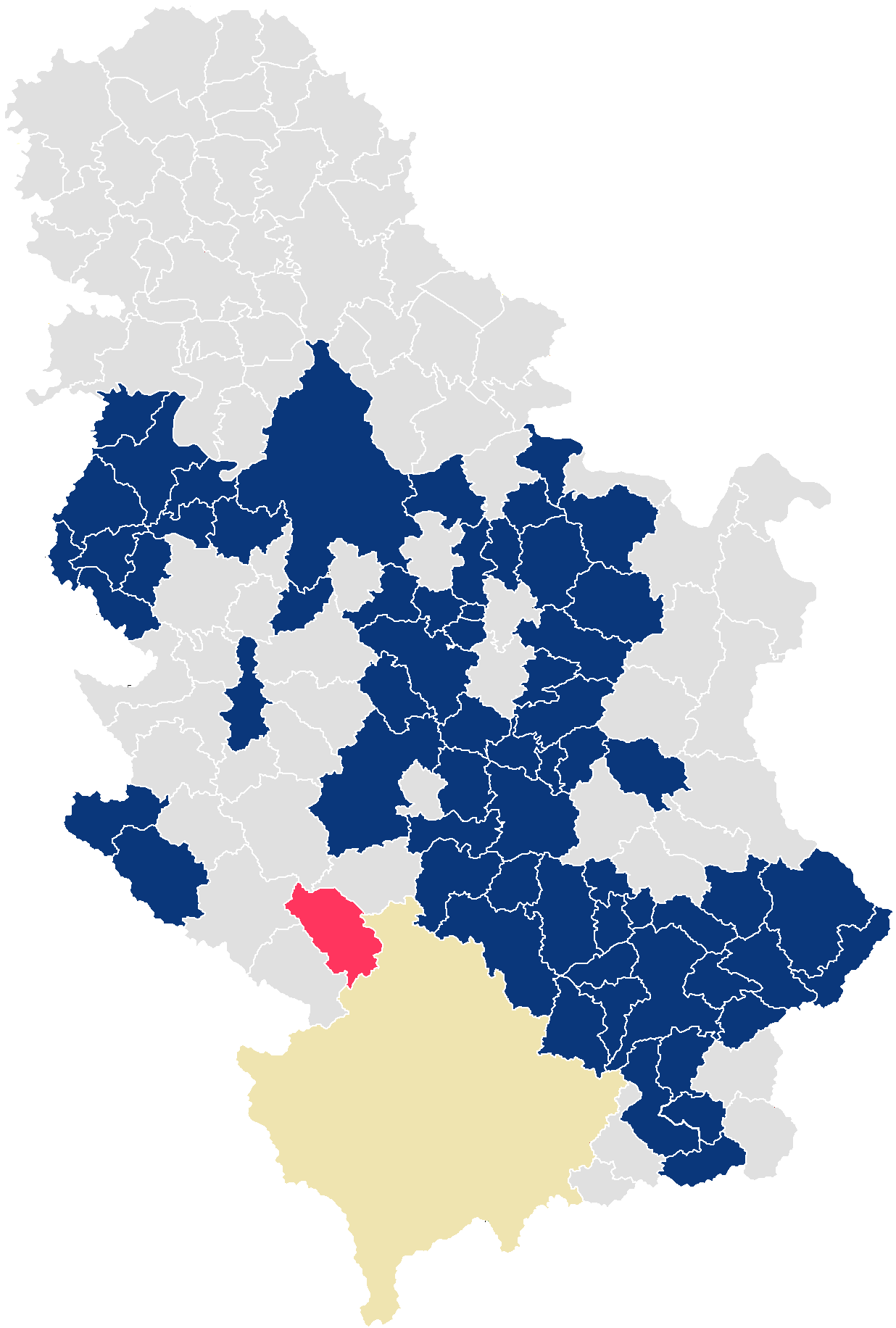
- Results of the local elections Serbian Progressive Party; Social Democratic Party of Serbia

Local elections in 65 cities and municipalities in Serbia were held on 17 December 2023. Initially scheduled to be held in 2024, Aleksandar Vučić, the president of Serbia, announced, first in September and again in October 2023, that local elections could be held in December 2023, concurrently with the provincial and parliamentary elections. Following his announcement in September 2023, mayors and presidents of municipalities, including the capital Belgrade, resigned for the local elections to take place on 17 December. The elections were called on 1 November.

== Background ==
In most cities and municipalities in Serbia, previous local elections, which were regular, were held on 21 June 2020. Initially scheduled for 26 April 2020, they were postponed due to the COVID-19 pandemic. The Serbian Progressive Party (SNS), which has been the ruling party of Serbia since 2012, has won most votes and seats in local assemblies of all cities and municipalities except Čajetina, Ražanj, Surdulica, Beočin, Topola, Svilajnac, and New Belgrade. Most opposition parties, including the opposition Alliance for Serbia coalition, boycotted the elections, claiming that they would not be free and fair. Since then, early local elections were held in 2 cities and 17 municipalities, in 2021 and 2022 respectively. In the 2021 local elections, SNS won the most seats in all municipalities except Preševo, and in 2022 it again won the most seats in the 12 municipalities and 2 cities where the local elections were held.

On national level, general elections were held in April 2022. SNS and its coalition partners won the most seats, while opposition parties returned to the National Assembly. The United for the Victory of Serbia alliance, which placed second in the parliamentary election and the Belgrade City Assembly election, was dissolved after the election. After the Belgrade school shooting and a mass murder near Mladenovac and Smederevo, anti-government protests have been organised in Serbia, with the largest being held in Belgrade. Tens of thousands of demonstrators have taken part in the protests, with Politico describing the protests as largest since the overthrow of Slobodan Milošević.

== Electoral system ==
Local elections in Serbia are held under a proportional representation system. Eligible voters vote for electoral lists, on which the registered candidates are present. An electoral list could be submitted by a registered political party, a coalition of political parties, or a citizens' group. The number of valid signatures needed to be collected to take part in the election varies by the number of eligible voters in that municipality. At least 40 percent of candidates on electoral lists must be female. The electoral list is submitted by its chosen ballot representative, who does not have to be present on its electoral list. An electoral list could be declined, after which those who had submitted can fix the deficiencies in a span of 48 hours, or rejected, if the person is not authorised to nominate candidates. The name and date of the election, the names of the electoral lists and its ballot representatives, and information on how to vote are only present on the voting ballot.

Local electoral commissions and polling boards oversee the election. Seats are allocated with an electoral threshold of 3 percent of all votes cast, however if no electoral list wins 3 percent of all votes cast, then all electoral lists that received votes can participate in the distribution of seats. The seats are distributed by electoral lists in proportion to the number of votes received, while the number of seats belonging to electoral lists is determined by applying the highest quotient system. The seats are distributed by dividing the total number of votes received by the electoral list participating in the distribution of seats by each number from one to the number of councillors the local assembly has. The obtained quotients are classified by size so that the electoral list has as many mandates as it has its quotients among the highest quotients of all the electoral lists participating in the distribution. If two or more electoral lists receive the same quotients on the basis of which the seat is distributed, the electoral list that received the greater number of votes has priority. The seats in the local assemblies are awarded to the candidates to their order on the electoral list, starting with the first candidate from an electoral list. When the councillors of a local assembly are sworn in, they in turn elect the mayor.

An electoral list could be declared the status of an ethnic minority electoral list by the local electoral commission. An ethnic minority electoral list could be only submitted by a registered political party or a coalition of political parties of an ethnic minority. If the percentage of the members of that ethnic minority is less than 50% in that municipality, an electoral list could be then granted the status of an ethnic minority electoral list. If the electoral list receives less than the 3 percent electoral threshold of all votes cast, it would still take part in the distribution of seats. When the distribution of seats takes place, the quotients of ethnic minority electoral lists that won less than 3 percent of the votes are increased by 35 percent.

Any local election, whether it is a municipal or a local assembly election, is called by the president of the National Assembly, who also has to announce its date. To vote, a person has to be a citizen and resident of Serbia and at least 18 years old. A voter could only vote in the municipality of their residence. An election silence begins two days before the scheduled election, meaning that no opinion polls, presentation of candidates and their programmes, or invitation to vote in the election could take place.

=== Election date ===
In April 2023, newspaper Danas reported that snap parliamentary elections, local elections, Vojvodina provincial election, and the Belgrade City Assembly election could be held as early as in November 2023. At a press conference in July 2023, Aleksandar Vučić, the president of Serbia and former president of SNS, said that an early parliamentary election "could take place in September or December if the opposition parties agree. And if not, we will have general elections in April or May 2024, to be held concurrently with the Vojvodina provincial election and the regular local elections". By law, the Vojvodina provincial election and regular local elections could be held as late as 30 June 2024. Darko Glišić, the president of the SNS executive board, stated that the local and provincial elections will be held in the first half of 2024. In August, Vučić said that provincial and local elections will "certainly be held in the next six or seven months", and that "most likely, parliamentary ones will be held as well".

Newspaper Nova and news portal N1 reported in September 2023 that local, provincial, and parliamentary elections could be held as early as 19 December 2023. Vučić and Vučević also held a gathering with officials from Vojvodina on 5 September, with newspaper Blic reporting that the official date will be revealed after the 78th United Nations General Assembly, which is set to be held on 18–26 September. In late September, Vučić announced that the elections will be called in December 2023 in order for them to be organised on 4 March 2023. He subsequently announced in September 2023 that they could be held on 17 December 2023.

Following Vučić's announcement that the elections could be held on 17 December, presidents of municipalities such as Smederevo, Leskovac, Kraljevo, Trstenik, and Kučevo resigned, automatically triggering snap elections in those municipalities. Alongside the presidents of municipalities of Smederevo, Leskovac, Kraljevo, Trstenik, and Kučevo, mayors and presidents of municipalities of Belgrade, Kruševac, Pirot, Novi Pazar, Šabac, Topola, Velika Plana, Lapovo, Veliko Gradište, Malo Crniće, Žabari, Petrovac, Žagubica, Bogatić, Vladimirci, Koceljeva, Despotovac, Požega, and Priboj resigned. In total, 65 mayors and presidents of municipalities resigned. Miloš Vučević, the deputy prime minister of Serbia and president of SNS, said in October 2023 that local elections in rest of municipalities will be held in May or June 2024. The government of Serbia sent a proposal to call local elections in 65 cities and municipalities on 30 October. Vladimir Orlić, the president of the National Assembly of Serbia, called the elections on 1 November.

== Abbreviations ==
Name	Abbreviation
Action for Smederevo	AZS
Alliance of Vojvodina Hungarians	VMSZ/SVM
Democratic Party	DS
Green–Left Front	ZLF
Healthy Serbia	ZS
Initiative for Požega	IZP
Movement for the Restoration of the Kingdom of Serbia	POKS
Movement of Free Citizens	PSG
New Democratic Party of Serbia	NDSS
Party of Freedom and Justice	SSP
PUPS – Solidarity and Justice	PUPS
People's Party	Narodna
Serbia Centre	SRCE
Serbian Movement Dveri	Dveri
Serbian Progressive Party	SNS
Serbian Party Oathkeepers	SSZ
Social Democratic Party	SDS
Social Democratic Party of Serbia	SDPS
Socialist Party of Serbia	SPS
Together	Zajedno
Together for Kragujevac	ZZK
United Serbia	JS

== Results and campaign ==
Demostat, a research and publishing non-governmental organisation, has reported that opposition parties will have a chance of obtaining good results in large urban areas like Belgrade, Novi Sad, Kragujevac, Niš, and Užice. They have pointed out examples like the formation of a joint opposition alliance in Kragujevac, and that despite not forming a local government, opposition parties won more votes than government parties in the Belgrade City Assembly election in 2022. Đorđe Vukadinović of Nova srpska politička misao has argued that opposition parties also have a chance of obtaining good results in Čačak but that in Šabac, Kraljevo, and Zrenjanin, elections could come close. "Although in the rest of Serbia SNS is generally the favourite, it is far from untouchability of previous elections", Vukadinović has said. Srećko Mihailović of Demostat has also said that opposition parties will have smaller chances of winning in smaller municipalities, mainly due to alleged abuse of power in smaller municipalities.

=== Šumadija and Western Serbia ===
==== Aleksandrovac ====
Incumbent Aleksandrovac mayor Mirko Mihajlović of the Serbian Progressive Party resigned in October 2023 to prompt a new election and was appointed as leader of a provisional authority.

The results of the election were as follows:

Party	Votes	%	Seats
Aleksandar Vučić–Aleksandrovac Must Not Stop (Serbian Progressive Party, Social Democratic Party of Serbia)	4,875	36.27	22
Citizens' Group: Movement for Župa–Dr. Jugoslav Stajkovac	2,538	18.88	11
Citizens' Group: Awakening of Župa–Ivan Brborić	2,466	18.35	11
Ivica Dačić–Prime Minister of Serbia (Socialist Party of Serbia)	1,809	13.46	8
Serbia Against Violence–Miroslav Miki Aleksić–Prof. Dragiša Stamenković (People's Movement of Serbia, Democratic Party)	1,532	11.40	7
United Serbia–Dragan Marković Palma	221	1.64	–
Total	13,441	100.00	59
Valid votes	13,441	96.06	
Invalid/blank votes	552	3.94	
Total votes	13,993	100.00	
Registered voters/turnout	21,297	65.70	

Jelena Paunović of the Serbian Progressive Party was chosen as mayor after the election.

==== Batočina ====
Incumbent Batočina mayor Zdravko Mladenović of the Serbian Progressive Party resigned on 30 October 2023 to prompt a new election. A provisional administration was subsequently established with Dejan Aranđelović, also of the Progressive Party, as its leader.

The results of the election were as follows:

Party	Votes	%	Seats
Aleksandar Vučić–Batočina Must Not Stop (Serbian Progressive Party, Better Serbia, Healthy Serbia)	3,335	53.70	17
Citizens' Group: Proven Better for Batočina	965	15.54	5
Ivica Dačić–Prime Minister of Serbia (Socialist Party of Serbia, United Serbia)	823	13.25	4
Citizens' Group: Let Batočina Win	384	6.18	1
Citizens' Group: Justice - Lawyer Predrag Vulović	305	4.91	1
Citizens' Group: Together for Batočina–Srđan Biorac	231	3.72	1
Milica Đurđević Stamenkovski–Serbian Party Oathkeepers	168	2.70	–
Total	6,211	100.00	29
Valid votes	6,211	97.11	
Invalid/blank votes	185	2.89	
Total votes	6,396	100.00	
Registered voters/turnout	9,695	65.97	

Dejan Aranđelović was chosen as mayor after the election.

==== Bogatić ====
Incumbent Bogatić mayor Milan Damnjamović of the Serbian Progressive Party resigned in October 2023 to prompt a new election and was appointed as leader of a provisional authority. Former parliamentarian Dragan Aćimović of the Serbian Radical Party, who had served as deputy speaker in the previous assembly, was also a member of the authority.

The results of the election were as follows:

Party	Votes	%	Seats
Aleksandar Vučić–Bogatić Must Not Stop (Serbian Progressive Party)	7,021	48.67	16
Victory for Mačva	3,438	23.83	8
Ivica Dačić–Prime Minister of Serbia (Socialist Party of Serbia)	1,373	9.52	3
Dr. Vojislav Šešelj–Serbian Radical Party	954	6.61	2
To Save Bogatić (Dveri)	546	3.79	1
Grad. Eng. Aleksandar Firaunović–European Green Party	480	3.33	1
New Face of Serbia–Miloš Parandilović–Milan Mašić	401	2.78	–
POKS–For the Life of a Worthy Man	212	1.47	–
Total	14,425	100.00	31
Valid votes	14,425	97.54	
Invalid/blank votes	364	2.46	
Total votes	14,789	100.00	
Registered voters/turnout	24,123	61.31	

Milan Damnjanović was chosen for a new term as mayor after the election. The Radicals supported the local government; Dragan Aćimović was elected from the lead position on the Radical Party's list and was appointed afterward to a new term as deputy speaker.

==== Brus ====
Incumbent Brus mayor Valentina Milosavljević of the Serbian Progressive Party resigned on 30 October 2023 to prompt a new election and was appointed as leader of a provisional authority.

The results of the election were as follows:

Party	Votes	%	Seats
Aleksandar Vučić–Brus Must Not Stop (Serbian Progressive Party, Social Democratic Party of Serbia)	4,934	58.21	18
Citizens' Group: "Dr. Duta" Brus for the People of Brus	1,840	21.71	7
Ivica Dačić–Prime Minister of Serbia (Socialist Party of Serbia)	737	8.70	2
Coalition: Serbia Against Violence Brus–Marinika Tepić (Party of Freedom and Justice, People's Movement of Serbia, Democratic Party, Independents)	454	5.36	1
Coalition: Serbian State-Building Bloc for Brus–Serbian Party Oathkeepers for Brus–POKS–Movement for the Restoration of the Kingdom of Serbia–Ivan Jeličić	307	3.62	1
United Serbia–Dragan Marković Palma–At Home for Brus	204	2.41	–
Total	8,476	100.00	29
Valid votes	8,476	97.03	
Invalid/blank votes	259	2.97	
Total votes	8,735	100.00	
Registered voters/turnout	12,712	68.71	

Dalibor Savić of the Serbian Progressive Party was chosen as mayor after the election.

==== Ćićevac ====
Incumbent Ćićevac mayor Mirjana Krkić of the Serbian Progressive Party resigned on 30 October 2023 to prompt a new election and was appointed as leader of a provisional authority.

The results of the election were as follows:

Party	Votes	%	Seats
Aleksandar Vučić–Ćićevac Must Not Stop (Serbian Progressive Party, Social Democratic Party of Serbia)	2,933	60.08	16
Serbia Against Violence–Ćuprija–Miroslav Miki Aleksić–Lawyer Nenad Jovanović (People's Movement of Serbia)	1,611	33.00	8
Ivica Dačić–Prime Minister of Serbia (Socialist Party of Serbia)	338	6.92	1
Total	4,882	100.00	25
Valid votes	4,882	96.96	
Invalid/blank votes	153	3.04	
Total votes	5,035	100.00	
Registered voters/turnout	7,227	69.67	

Mirjana Krkić was chosen for another term as mayor after the election.

==== Ćuprija ====
Incumbent Ćuprija mayor Jovica Antić of the Serbian Progressive Party resigned in October 2023 to prompt a new election and was appointed as leader of a provisional authority.

The results of the election were as follows:

Party	Votes	%	Seats
Aleksandar Vučić–Ćuprija Must Not Stop (Serbian Progressive Party, PUPS – Solidarity and Justice, Social Democratic Party of Serbia)	7,803	57.74	22
Serbia Against Violence–Ćuprija–Miroslav Miki Aleksić–Marinika Tepić (Party of Freedom and Justice, People's Movement of Serbia, Democratic Party)	2,555	18.90	7
Ivica Dačić–Prime Minister of Serbia (Socialist Party of Serbia)	1,746	12.92	5
Milica Đurđević Stamenkovski–Serbian Party Oathkeepers	774	5.73	2
United Serbia–Dragan Marković Palma–At Home	637	4.71	1
Total	13,515	100.00	37
Valid votes	13,515	95.95	
Invalid/blank votes	570	4.05	
Total votes	14,085	100.00	
Registered voters/turnout	28,471	49.47	

Jelena Đulinac of the Serbian Progressive Party was chosen as mayor after the election.

==== Despotovac ====
Incumbent Despotovac mayor Zlatko Marjanović of the Serbian Progressive Party resigned on 30 October 2023 to prompt a new election and was appointed as leader of a provisional authority.

The results of the election were as follows:

Party	Votes	%	Seats
Aleksandar Vučić–Despotovac Must Not Stop (Serbian Progressive Party, PUPS – Solidarity and Justice, Social Democratic Party of Serbia)	5,734	53.87	18
Ivica Dačić–Prime Minister of Serbia (Socialist Party of Serbia)	1,596	14.99	5
Citizens' Group: For the Revival of the Municipality of Despotovac	1,239	11.64	3
Citizens' Group: United for Resava	1,202	11.29	3
Victory, Not Division!–Serbian Movement Dveri–Bunt–True Serbia	499	4.69	1
United Serbia–Dragan Marković Palma	374	3.51	1
Total	10,644	100.00	31
Valid votes	10,644	96.36	
Invalid/blank votes	402	3.64	
Total votes	11,046	100.00	
Registered voters/turnout	21,683	50.94	

Zlatko Marjanović was chosen for another term as mayor after the election.

==== Knić ====
Incumbent Knić mayor Srećko Ilić of the Serbian Progressive Party resigned on 30 October 2023 to prompt a new election and was appointed as leader of a provisional authority.

The results of the elections were as follows:

Party	Votes	%	Seats
Aleksandar Vučić–Knić Must Not Stop (Serbian Progressive Party, Healthy Serbia, Social Democratic Party of Serbia, PUPS – Solidarity and Justice)	3,522	53.35	14
Knić Against Violence (Party of Freedom and Justice, Democratic Party)	765	11.59	3
People's Movement of Serbia Knić–Miroslav Miki Aleksić	709	10.74	3
Citizens' Group: "You Decide–Knić Without a Mine"	635	9.62	2
Ivica Dačić–Prime Minister of Serbia (Socialist Party of Serbia)	530	8.03	2
United Serbia–Dragan Marković Palma–Betula	441	6.68	1
Total	6,602	100.00	25
Valid votes	6,602	97.16	
Invalid/blank votes	193	2.84	
Total votes	6,795	100.00	
Registered voters/turnout	10,488	64.79	

Srećko Ilić was confirmed for a new term as mayor after the election with the support of seventeen delegates.

==== Koceljeva ====
Incumbent Koceljeva mayor Dušan Ilinčić of the Serbian Progressive Party resigned in October 2023 to prompt a new election and was appointed as leader of a provisional authority.

The results of the elections were as follows:

Party	Votes	%	Seats
Aleksandar Vučić–Koceljeva Must Not Stop (Serbian Progressive Party, Serbian Radical Party, Movement of Socialists)	5,043	70.04	22
To Save Koceljeva (Dveri)	1,638	22.75	7
Ivica Dačić–Prime Minister of Serbia (Socialist Party of Serbia)	519	7.21	2
Total	7,200	100.00	31
Valid votes	7,200	95.71	
Invalid/blank votes	323	4.29	
Total votes	7,523	100.00	
Registered voters/turnout	10,691	70.37	

Dušan Ilinčić was confirmed for another term as mayor after the election.

==== Kragujevac ====
Incumbent Kragujevac mayor Nikola Dašić of the Serbian Progressive Party announced his resignation on 28 September 2023 and formally resigned on 30 October, thereby prompting a new election. He was appointed as leader of a provisional authority.

In June 2023, a group of opposition parties and citizens' groups, which included DS, Narodna, POKS, PSG, SDS, SRCE, SSP, Zajedno, ZS, and ZZK, announced their joint participation in the local election in Kragujevac. Former mayors of Kragujevac Veroljub Stevanović and Vlatko Rajković were one of the signatories. Dveri, NDSS, and SSZ refused to join.

The results of the election were as follows:

Party	Votes	%	Seats
Aleksandar Vučić–Kragujevac Must Not Stop (Serbian Progressive Party, Social Democratic Party of Serbia, Better Serbia, Movement of Socialists, Healthy Serbia, Strength of Serbia Movement, PUPS – Solidarity and Justice, Serbian Radical Party)	36,136	40.27	38
United Against Violence–Hope for Kragujevac (Movement for the Restoration of the Kingdom of Serbia, Party of Freedom and Justice, People's Movement of Serbia, New Democratic Party of Serbia, Democratic Party, Civic Democratic Party)	13,787	15.36	14
Citizens' Group: "Slađan Rakić–Kragujevac Initiative–I Love the Village Movement–Eko Park"	10,971	12.23	11
New Strength of Kragujevac–Nikola Nešić (Together, SRCE–Zdravko Ponoš, Ecological Uprising–Ćuta, Green–Left Front, Šumadija Region)	6,503	7.25	6
Ivica Dačić–Prime Minister of Serbia (Socialist Party of Serbia)	6,239	6.95	6
Citizens' Group: 300 Kragujevac Citizens–Dušan Zeka Aleksić–Bright Point	4,065	4.53	4
Citizens' Group: For Kragujevac–We Know Each Other! Dr. Miroslav Stojanović Džuga	3,835	4.27	4
Milica Đurđević Stamenkovski–Boško Obradović–National Gathering–State-Building Force (Serbian Party Oathkeepers, Dveri)	2,205	2.46	–
United Serbia–Dragan Marković Palma	1,962	2.19	–
Movement: Kragujevac the Capital–Serbia the Kingdom–Russian Party	1,643	1.83	2
Kragujevac–Strong and Brave	1,258	1.40	1
Boris Kovačević Šuma–My World Kragujevac–Šumadijski Blok 21–Montenegrin Party	1,135	1.26	1
Total	89,739	100.00	87
Valid votes	89,739	97.25	
Invalid/blank votes	2,542	2.75	
Total votes	92,281	100.00	
Registered voters/turnout	152,516	60.51	

Nikola Dašić was confirmed for another term as mayor after the election.

Parliamentarian Nataša Jovanović of the Serbian Progressive Party was elected to the city assembly from the fifth position on the Kragujevac Must Not Stop list.

Slađana Radisavljević of the New Democratic Party of Serbia was elected from the fourth position on the United Against Violence–Hope for Kragujevac list. She resigned her seat in the city assembly in February 2024, saying that she wanted to focus on her work as a parliamentarian.

Nikola Nešić was re-elected to the assembly from the lead position on the New Strength of Kragujevac list.

Mirko Čikiriz, the leader of Kragujevac the Capital–Serbia the Kingdom, was re-elected to the assembly from the second position on his movement's coalition list with the Russian Party.

==== Kraljevo ====
Incumbent Kraljevo mayor Predrag Terzić of the Serbian Progressive Party resigned on 30 October 2023 to prompt a new election and was appointed as leader of a provisional authority.

The results of the elections were as follows:

Party	Votes	%	Seats
Aleksandar Vučić–Kraljevo Must Not Stop (Serbian Progressive Party, Movement of Socialists, PUPS – Solidarity and Justice, Healthy Serbia, Serbian Renewal Movement, Social Democratic Party of Serbia)	23,911	41.49	33
Citizens' Group: Ivan Matović–Longtime Residents–New Face of Kraljevo–We Don't Give Up the Ibar–Let's Save Studenica	9,265	16.08	12
Serbia Against Violence Miroslav Miki Aleksić–Marinika Tepić (Serbia Centre, People's Movement of Serbia, Party of Freedom and Justice, Democratic Party)	6,127	10.63	8
Ivica Dačić–Prime Minister of Serbia (Socialist Party of Serbia, United Serbia)	5,728	9.94	7
Local Front–Predrag Voštinić	5,516	9.57	7
Dr. Miloš Jovanović–Hope for Kraljevo–Serbian Coalition NADA–National Democratic Alternative–New Democratic Party of Serbia (New DSS)–Movement for the Restoration of the Kingdom of Serbia (POKS)–Vojislav Mihailović	2,437	4.23	3
Milica Đurđević Stamenkovski–Strahinja Erac–Serbian Party Oathkeepers	1,654	2.87	–
Dr. Vojislav Šešelj–Serbian Radical Party	983	1.71	–
Dveri for Kraljevo–Dragan Vesović	958	1.66	–
People's Party–Safe Choice, Serious People for Kraljevo–Vuk Jeremić, Katarina Jović, Dr. Sanda Rašković Ivić, Siniša Kovačević, Vladimir Gajić, Marina Lipovac Tanasković	654	1.13	–
Russian Party–Marko Petrović	397	0.69	–
Total	57,630	100.00	70
Valid votes	57,630	97.56	
Invalid/blank votes	1,440	2.44	
Total votes	59,070	100.00	
Registered voters/turnout	99,000	59.67	

Predrag Terzić was chosen for another term as mayor after the election.

United Serbia parliamentarian Marija Jevđić was re-elected to the city assembly from the second position on the Socialist-led list.

==== Krupanj ====
Incumbent Krupanj mayor Ivan Isailović of the Serbian Progressive Party resigned in October 2023 to prompt a new election and was appointed as leader of a provisional authority.

The results of the elections were as follows:

Party	Votes	%	Seats
Aleksandar Vučić–Krupanj Must Not Stop (Serbian Progressive Party, Serbian People's Party, Social Democratic Party of Serbia)	4,154	48.47	18
Citizens' Group: We Don't Give Rađevina–Štefika Dragoslav	2,577	30.07	11
Ivica Dačić–Prime Minister of Serbia (Socialist Party of Serbia)	1,001	11.68	4
Hope for Krupanj–POKS–DS–For a Fair and Free Rađevina	597	6.97	2
Dr. Vojislav Šešelj–Serbian Radical Party	241	2.81	–
Total	8,570	100.00	35
Valid votes	8,570	95.81	
Invalid/blank votes	375	4.19	
Total votes	8,945	100.00	
Registered voters/turnout	13,001	68.80	

Mladen Stefanović of the Progressive Party was chosen as mayor when the new assembly convened in January 2024.

==== Kruševac ====
Incumbent Kruševac mayor Jasmina Palurović of the Serbian Progressive Party resigned on 30 October 2023 to prompt a new election and was appointed as leader of a provisional authority.

The results of the election were as follows:

Party	Votes	%	Seats
Aleksandar Vučić–Kruševac Must Not Stop (Serbian Progressive Party, PUPS – Solidarity and Justice, Social Democratic Party of Serbia, Healthy Serbia, Independents)	36,950	57.88	42
Kruševac Against Violence–Dr. Branislav Bata Andrić (Party of Freedom and Justice, People's Movement of Serbia, Democratic Party, Serbia Centre, New Face of Serbia, Together, Civic Democratic Party, Independents)	16,480	25.82	18
Ivica Dačić–Prime Minister of Serbia (Socialist Party of Serbia, United Serbia)	4,402	6.90	5
Dr. Miloš Jovanović–Hope for Kruševac–Serbian Coalition NADA–National Democratic Alternative–New Democratic Party of Serbia (New DSS)–Movement for the Restoration of the Kingdom of Serbia (POKS)–Vojislav Mihailović	3,093	4.85	3
Milica Đurđević Stamenkovski–Boško Obradović–National Gathering–State-Building Force–Serbian Party Oathkeepers–Serbian Movement Dveri	2,053	3.22	2
Dr. Vojislav Šešelj–Serbian Radical Party	858	1.34	–
Total	63,836	100.00	70
Valid votes	63,836	97.36	
Invalid/blank votes	1,734	2.64	
Total votes	65,570	100.00	
Registered voters/turnout	104,972	62.46	

Ivan Manojlović of the Serbian Progressive Party was chosen as mayor after the election.

==== Lajkovac ====
Incumbent Lajkovac mayor Andrija Živković of the Serbian Progressive Party resigned in October 2023 to permit a new election and was appointed as leader of a provisional authority.

The results of the election were as follows:

Party	Votes	%	Seats
Aleksandar Vučić–Lajkovac Must Not Stop (Serbian Progressive Party, PUPS – Solidarity and Justice, Movement of Socialists)	4,325	53.86	20
People's Party–Safe Choice. Serious People for Lajkovac–Vuk Jeremić, Aleksandar Marković, Dr. Sanda Rašković Ivić, Siniša Kovačević, Vladimir Gajić, Marina Lipovac Tanasković	1,474	18.36	6
Lajkovac Against Violence	1,360	16.94	6
Ivica Dačić–Prime Minister of Serbia (Socialist Party of Serbia)	488	6.08	2
Coalition Simply for Lajkovac (Serbian Movement Dveri, New Face of Serbia)	383	4.77	1
Total	8,030	100.00	35
Valid votes	8,030	96.49	
Invalid/blank votes	292	3.51	
Total votes	8,322	100.00	
Registered voters/turnout	11,466	72.58	

Andrija Živković was confirmed for another term as mayor after the election.

==== Lapovo ====
Incumbent Lapovo mayor Boban Miličić of the Serbian Progressive Party resigned on 30 October 2023 to prompt a new election and was appointed as leader of a provisional authority.

The results of the election were as follows:

Party	Votes	%	Seats
Aleksandar Vučić–Lapovo Must Not Stop (Serbian Progressive Party)	2,454	73.94	16
Ivica Dačić–Prime Minister of Serbia (Socialist Party of Serbia)	865	26.06	5
Total	3,319	100.00	21
Valid votes	3,319	87.39	
Invalid/blank votes	479	12.61	
Total votes	3,798	100.00	
Registered voters/turnout	6,477	58.64	

Boban Miličić was confirmed for another term as mayor after the election.

==== Ljig ====
Incumbent Ljig mayor Dragan Lazarević of the Serbian Progressive Party resigned in October 2023 to prompt a new election. Milomir Starčević, who had previously been elected to the municipal assembly as a member of the Socialist Party of Serbia, was appointed as leader of a provisional authority. For the 2023 election, Starčević led the list of the Progressive Party.

The results of the election were as follows:

Party	Votes	%	Seats
Aleksandar Vučić–Ljig Must Not Stop (Serbian Progressive Party, PUPS – Solidarity and Justice)	2,174	37.66	9
Municipal Coalition Ljig Against Violence (People's Movement of Serbia, Democratic Party, Party of Freedom and Justice, Independents)	1,320	22.87	5
Citizens' Group: Domaćinski Odjek Ljig–Vukosav Sredojević, Dipl. Inž.	1,056	18.29	4
Ivica Dačić–Prime Minister of Serbia (Socialist Party of Serbia)	531	9.20	2
Citizens' Group: "Together and Decisively for the Municipality of Ljig"–Mr. Dragan Stevanović Persinac, Dipl. Inž."	504	8.73	2
Milica Đurđević Stamenkovski–Serbian Party Oathkeepers	188	3.26	1
Total	5,773	100.00	23
Valid votes	5,773	96.55	
Invalid/blank votes	206	3.45	
Total votes	5,979	100.00	
Registered voters/turnout	8,574	69.73	

Milomir Starčević, who was by this time a member of the Progressive Party, was chosen for a full term as mayor after the election. The government was supported by the Progressive alliance, the Socialist Party, and the "Together and Decisively" list.

==== Ljubovija ====
Incumbent Ljubovija mayor Milan Jovanović of the Serbian Progressive Party resigned on 30 October 2023 to prompt a new election and was appointed as leader of a provisional authority.

The results of the election were as follows:

Party	Votes	%	Seats
Aleksandar Vučić–Ljubovija Must Not Stop (Serbian Progressive Party, Serbian People's Party, Healthy Serbia)	3,907	41.85	12
Ivica Dačić–Prime Minister of Serbia (Socialist Party of Serbia)	3,366	36.05	10
SDPS–Goran Josipović Gigo	1,201	12.86	3
Citizens' Group: Together for Ljubovija–Rade Ignjatović–Milovan Kovačević–Nikola Radovanović	523	5.60	1
Dr. Vojislav Šešelj–Serbian Radical Party	339	3.63	1
Total	9,336	100.00	27
Valid votes	9,336	95.28	
Invalid/blank votes	463	4.72	
Total votes	9,799	100.00	
Registered voters/turnout	13,442	72.90	

Milan Jovanović was confirmed for another term as mayor after the election.

Former parliamentarian Sreto Perić was the candidate elected on the Radical Party's list. He resigned his seat on 25 January 2024, when the new assembly convened. He was later appointed as an assistant to the mayor.

==== Loznica ====
Incumbent Loznica mayor Vidoje Petrović of the Serbian Progressive Party resigned as mayor October 2023 to prompt a new election and was appointed as leader of a provisional authority.

The results of the election were as follows:

Party	Votes	%	Seats
Aleksandar Vučić–Loznica Must Not Stop (Serbian Progressive Party, Movement of Socialists, Social Democratic Party of Serbia, Serbian People's Party, Serbian Radical Party)	21,010	55.52	34
Serbia Against Violence–Mr (Note: In this context, "Mr" stands for "Master" and refers to Đedović's academic credentials.) Dajana Đedović (Party of Freedom and Justice, Democratic Party, Civic Democratic Party, People's Movement of Serbia)	5,572	14.72	9
Hope for Loznica–We Don't Want a Mine in Loznica–National Gathering (Serbian Movement Dveri–New DSS–POKS)–Slaviša Miletić	4,266	11.27	6
Ivica Dačić–Prime Minister of Serbia (Socialist Party of Serbia)	3,367	8.90	5
Citizens' Group: Boldly for a Better Loznica–Dragan Pajić	2,305	6.09	3
Milica Đurđević Stamenkovski–Serbian Party Oathkeepers	1,325	3.50	2
Total	37,845	100.00	59
Valid votes	37,845	96.02	
Invalid/blank votes	1,570	3.98	
Total votes	39,415	100.00	
Registered voters/turnout	75,666	52.09	

Vidoje Petrović was chosen for a sixth consecutive term as mayor after the election, with the support of forty-two delegates.

Petrović resigned as mayor in October 2024. Dragana Lukić, also a member of the Progressive Party, was chosen as his successor on 7 November 2024.

==== Mali Zvornik ====
Incumbent Mali Zvornik mayor Zoran Jevtić of the Serbian Progressive Party resigned on 30 October 2023 to prompt a new election and was appointed as leader of a provisional authority.

The results of the election were as follows:

Party	Votes	%	Seats
Aleksandar Vučić–Mali Zvornik Must Not Stop (Serbian Progressive Party, Social Democratic Party of Serbia)	4,729	49.53	12
Ivica Dačić–Prime Minister of Serbia (Socialist Party of Serbia)	2,681	28.08	7
Dr. Miloš Jovanović–Hope for Mali Zvornik–National Democratic Alternative–New Democratic Party of Serbia (New DSS)–Movement for the Restoration of the Kingdom of Serbia (POKS)–Vojislav Mihailović	1,066	11.17	2
Citizens' Group: "Strength of the People"–Dr. Milan Lukić	560	5.87	1
Milica Đurđević Stamenkovski–Serbian Party Oathkeepers	419	4.39	1
Citizens' Group: "Drina"	39	0.41	–
Citizens' Group: "Agreed for Democratic Mali Zvornik"	35	0.37	–
Citizens' Group: "The Original Socialist Ideal"	18	0.19	–
Total	9,547	100.00	23
Valid votes	9,547	96.96	
Invalid/blank votes	299	3.04	
Total votes	9,846	100.00	
Registered voters/turnout	16,234	60.65	

Zoran Jevtić was chosen for another term as mayor after the election.

==== Novi Pazar ====
Incumbent Novi Pazar mayor Nihat Biševac of the Sandžak Democratic Party resigned on 30 October 2023 to prompt a new election and was appointed as leader of a provisional authority.

The results of the election were as follows:

Party	Votes	%	Seats
European Novi Pazar–Rasim Ljajić (Sandžak Democratic Party, Social Democratic Party of Serbia)	17,262	38.67	19
Edin Đerlek for Mayor–Change Is Victory (Justice and Reconciliation Party)	10,759	24.10	12
SDA Sandžak–Dr. Sulejman Ugljanin	8,972	20.10	10
Aleksandar Vučić–Novi Pazar Must Not Stop–Ivica Dačić (Serbian Progressive Party, Socialist Party of Serbia, Serbian Radical Party)	4,691	10.51	5
Citizens' Group: Civic Movement of Sandžak–For a Life Worthy of Man	1,555	3.48	1
Novi Pazar Against Violence–Marinika Tepić–Benjamin Birđozlić (Party of Freedom and Justice)	839	1.88	–
Together For the Future and Development–A Coalition for Peace and Tolerance	461	1.03	–
Bosniak-Serb Alliance–BOSS–Samir Tandir	105	0.24	–
Total	44,644	100.00	47
Valid votes	44,644	97.48	
Invalid/blank votes	1,156	2.52	
Total votes	45,800	100.00	
Registered voters/turnout	91,262	50.19	

Nihat Biševac was confirmed for another term as mayor after the election. The government was formed by the Sandžak Democratic Party's alliance and the Serbian Progressive Party's alliance.

Jahja Fehratović, the leader of the For the Future and Development party, appeared in the largely symbolic twenty-sixth and final position on his party's list.

==== Osečina ====
Incumbent Osečina mayor Nikola Tomić of the Serbian Progressive Party resigned on 28 September 2023 to prompt a new election and was appointed as leader of a provisional authority.

The results of the election were as follows:

Party	Votes	%	Seats
Aleksandar Vučić–Osečina Must Not Stop (Serbian Progressive Party, Serbian People's Party, PUPS – Solidarity and Justice)	3,699	61.80	21
Serbia Against Violence–Dr. Marija Jančić–Vladimir Radivojević (Together, Democratic Party)	1,575	26.32	9
Ivica Dačić–Prime Minister of Serbia (Socialist Party of Serbia)	386	6.45	2
Dr. Miloš Jovanović–Hope for Osečina–National Democratic Alternative–New Democratic Party of Serbia (New DSS)–Movement for the Restoration of the Kingdom of Serbia (POKS)–Vojislav Mihailović	325	5.43	1
Total	5,985	100.00	33
Valid votes	5,985	96.77	
Invalid/blank votes	200	3.23	
Total votes	6,185	100.00	
Registered voters/turnout	9,307	66.46	

Nikola Tomić was appointed for another term as mayor after the election.

==== Paraćin ====
Incumbent Paraćin mayor Vladimir Milićević of the Serbian Progressive Party resigned on 30 October 2023 to prompt a new election and was appointed as leader of a provisional authority.

The results of the election were as follows:

Party	Votes	%	Seats
Aleksandar Vučić–Paraćin Must Not Stop (Serbian Progressive Party, United Serbia, PUPS – Solidarity and Justice)	14,139	56.38	31
Citizens' Group: United Opposition of Paraćin–Bojan Jovanović	4,969	19.81	11
Ivica Dačić–Prime Minister (Socialist Party of Serbia)	2,703	10.78	6
Paraćin Against Violence–SSP, SRCE	1,768	7.05	4
POKS-Hope for Paraćin–New Democratic Party of Serbia (New DSS)–Nemanja Radomirović	1,500	5.98	3
Total	25,079	100.00	55
Valid votes	25,079	96.60	
Invalid/blank votes	882	3.40	
Total votes	25,961	100.00	
Registered voters/turnout	46,396	55.96	

Vladimir Milićević was confirmed for another term as mayor after the election.

==== Požega ====
Incumbent Požega mayor Đorđe Nikitović of the Serbian Progressive Party submitted his resignation on 28 September 2023 in order for the municipality to participate in the early elections. He was appointed afterward as leader of a provisional authority.

An electoral alliance composed of DS and IZP was formalised in October 2023, when the two signed a coalition agreement.

The results of the election were as follows:

Party	Votes	%	Seats
Aleksandar Vučić–Požega Must Not Stop (Serbian Progressive Party, PUPS – Solidarity and Justice)	6,673	46.97	17
Požega Against Violence–Bogdan Radovanović–Mišo Marković (Initiative for Požega, Green–Left Front, Democratic Party)	4,478	31.52	11
Ivica Dačić–Prime Minister (Socialist Party of Serbia, United Serbia)	1,371	9.65	3
Dr. Miloš Jovanović–Hope for Požega–Serbian Coalition NADA–National Democratic Alternative–New Democratic Party of Serbia (New DSS)–Movement for the Restoration of the Kingdom of Serbia (POKS)–Vojislav Mihailović	1,211	8.52	3
Dr. Vojislav Šešelj–Serbian Radical Party	474	3.34	1
Total	14,207	100.00	35
Valid votes	14,207	97.10	
Invalid/blank votes	424	2.90	
Total votes	14,631	100.00	
Registered voters/turnout	23,030	63.53	

Đorđe Nikitović was chosen for a third term as mayor of Požega in February 2024. Bogdan Radovanović was elected from the lead position on the Požega Against Violence list.

==== Priboj ====
Incumbent Priboj mayor Lazar Rvović of the Serbian Progressive Party submitted his resignation on 28 September 2023 in order for the municipality to participate in the early elections. He was appointed afterward as leader of a provisional authority.

The Serbian Progressive Party and the Socialist Party of Serbia ran on a combined list, as they had done in the previous 2020 local elections.

The results of the election were as follows:

Party	Votes	%	Seats
Aleksandar Vučić–Priboj Must Not Stop–Ivica Dačić (Serbian Progressive Party, Socialist Party of Serbia, Healthy Serbia, PUPS – Solidarity and Justice, Movement of Socialists, Serbian Radical Party)	7,364	53.87	23
Citizens' Group: United in Victory "Sloga!" Dr. Nenad Anđić–New Face of Priboj–Miloš Parandilović	2,946	21.55	9
"People for Priboj–Dr. Jasminko Toskić, Dr. Adel Slatina" (Sandžak Democratic Party, Social Democratic Party of Serbia)	1,239	9.06	4
Fahrudin Alagić–SPP–Change Is Victory	667	4.88	2
Dr. Miloš Jovanović–Hope for Priboj–Serbian Coalition NADA–National Democratic Alternative–New Democratic Party of Serbia (New DSS)–Movement for the Restoration of the Kingdom of Serbia (POKS)–Vojislav Mihailović	591	4.32	1
SDA Sandžak–Dr. Sulejman Ugljanin	492	3.60	1
Bosniak-Serb Alliance–BOSS–Samir Tandir	370	2.71	1
Total	13,669	100.00	41
Valid votes	13,669	97.57	
Invalid/blank votes	340	2.43	
Total votes	14,009	100.00	
Registered voters/turnout	27,368	51.19	

Lazar Rvović was chosen for a fifth term as mayor of Priboj in February 2024. The governing coalition comprised the Priboj Must Not Stop alliance, the Sandžak Democratic Party, the Justice and Reconciliation Party, and the Bosniak-Serb Alliance.

Parliamentarian Dijana Radović of the Socialist Party of Serbia was elected from the eighth position on the Priboj Must Not Stop list.

==== Prijepolje ====
Incumbent Prijepolje mayor Drago Popadić of the Serbian Progressive Party submitted his resignation on 28 September 2023 in order for the municipality to participate in the early elections. Izudin Šantić of the Sandžak Democratic Party was appointed afterward as leader of a provisional authority.

The Serbian Progressive Party and the Socialist Party of Serbia ran on a combined list, as they had done in Prijepolje in the previous 2020 local elections.

The results of the election were as follows:

Party	Votes	%	Seats
Aleksandar Vučić–Prijepolje Must Not Stop–Ivica Dačić (Serbian Progressive Party, Socialist Party of Serbia, Serbian Radical Party, PUPS – Solidarity and Justice)	8,144	43.92	19
Together for Prijepolje (Sandžak Democratic Party, Social Democratic Party of Serbia, Democratic Party of Sandžak)	4,623	24.93	11
Dr. Elmedin Čičić for President–SPP–Change Is Victory	2,350	12.67	5
Bosniak-Serb Alliance–BOSS–Samir Tandir	969	5.23	2
For a Clean Prijepolje and New Face of Serbia	909	4.90	2
Prijepolje's Story–Serbian Movement Dveri (Dveri, Independents)	804	4.34	1
SDA Sandžak–Dr. Sulejman Ugljanin	745	4.02	1
Total	18,544	100.00	41
Valid votes	18,544	97.88	
Invalid/blank votes	401	2.12	
Total votes	18,945	100.00	
Registered voters/turnout	32,077	59.06	

Drago Popadić was chosen for a new term as mayor in February 2024, with the support of thirty-eight of the thirty-nine delegates who were present.

Bosniak-Serb Alliance president Samir Tandir was elected from the lead position on his party's list and was chosen as vice-president of the assembly.

==== Rača ====
Incumbent Rača mayor Nenad Savković of the Serbian Progressive Party resigned on 30 October 2023 to prompt a new election and was appointed as leader of a provisional authority.

The results of the election were as follows:

Party	Votes	%	Seats
Aleksandar Vučić–Rača Must Not Stop (Serbian Progressive Party, Healthy Serbia)	3,747	77.79	21
Ivica Dačić–Prime Minister (Socialist Party of Serbia, United Serbia)	1,070	22.21	6
Total	4,817	100.00	27
Valid votes	4,817	78.86	
Invalid/blank votes	1,291	21.14	
Total votes	6,108	100.00	
Registered voters/turnout	9,083	67.25	

Branko Radosavljević of the Serbian Progressive Party was chosen as mayor after the election.

==== Rekovac ====
Incumbent Rekovac mayor Aleksandar Đorđević of the Serbian Progressive Party resigned on 30 October 2023 to prompt a new election and was appointed as leader of a provisional authority.

The results of the election were as follows:

Party	Votes	%	Seats
Aleksandar Vučić–Rekovac Must Not Stop (Serbian Progressive Party, PUPS – Solidarity and Justice)	2,013	37.78	9
Ivica Dačić–Prime Minister (Socialist Party of Serbia)	1,217	22.84	5
Citizens' Group: Dr. Dragan Prodanović	1,023	19.20	4
Serbia Against Violence–Rekovac (People's Movement of Serbia, Democratic Party)	647	12.14	2
Citizens' Group: United for a Better Levač	428	8.03	1
Total	5,328	100.00	21
Valid votes	5,328	97.08	
Invalid/blank votes	160	2.92	
Total votes	5,488	100.00	
Registered voters/turnout	8,171	67.16	

Dragiša Tomić of the Serbian Progressive Party was chosen as mayor after the election.

==== Šabac ====
Incumbent Šabac mayor Aleksandar Pajić resigned on 30 October 2023 in order to prompt a new election and was appointed as leader of a provisional authority.

The results of the election were as follows:

Party	Votes	%	Seats
Aleksandar Vučić–Šabac Must Not Stop (Serbian Progressive Party, PUPS – Solidarity and Justice, Movement of Socialists)	28,808	45.45	35
Šabac Against Violence–Nebojša Zelenović (Together, Party of Freedom and Justice, Democratic Party, Civic Democratic Party, Serbian Renewal Movement, Movement for the Restoration of the Kingdom of Serbia, Movement for Reversal)	15,600	24.61	18
Citizens' Group: Nemanja Pajić–Western Serbia–Always Šabac	6,807	10.74	8
United We Win–Miroslav Aleksić–Zdravko Ponoš–Miloš Parandilović–Tatjana Marković Topalović (Serbia Centre, People's Movement of Serbia, New Face of Serbia)	2,307	3.64	2
Ivica Dačić–Prime Minister of Serbia (Socialist Party of Serbia)	2,210	3.49	2
Dr. Miloš Jovanović–Hope for Šabac–Serbian Coalition NADA–National Democratic Alternative–New Democratic Party of Serbia (New DSS)–For the Kingdom of Serbia	1,969	3.11	2
Citizens' Group: A Clean Slate for a Different Šabac–Vladimir Terzić–Dušan Tufegdžić	1,698	2.68	–
Dr. Dejan Pavlović–European Green Party	1,321	2.08	2
Citizens' Group: At Home for the Village and the City–We Know It–Dragan Stanković	898	1.42	–
Dr. Vojislav Šešelj–Serbian Radical Party	872	1.38	–
It Is Time for Action–Dr. Saša Filipović (Green Party of Serbia)	492	0.78	–
Russian Party–Slobodan Nikolić	408	0.64	–
Total	63,390	100.00	69
Valid votes	63,390	97.29	
Invalid/blank votes	1,768	2.71	
Total votes	65,158	100.00	
Registered voters/turnout	100,051	65.12	

Aleksandar Pajić was chosen for another term as mayor after the election. The local government is supported by the Serbian Progressive Party's alliance, Western Serbia, the European Green Party, and the Socialist Party of Serbia.

Tatjana Marković Topalović was elected to the city assembly from the lead position on the United We Win list.

==== Topola ====
Incumbent Topola mayor Vladimir Radojković of the Serbian Progressive Party resigned on 30 October 2023 to prompt a new election. Former mayor Dragan Jovanović, also of the Progressive Party, was appointed as leader of a provisional authority.

The results of the election were as follows:

Party	Votes	%	Seats
Aleksandar Vučić–Topola Must Not Stop (Serbian Progressive Party, PUPS – Solidarity and Justice)	4,888	45.29	20
Citizens' Group: New People–Topola Is Our Land–Mirko Jevtić–Topola Is Loved!	3,601	33.37	15
Ivica Dačić–Prime Minister of Serbia (Socialist Party of Serbia)	761	7.05	3
Topola Against Violence–Miroslav Miki Aleksić–Marinika Tepić (Party of Freedom and Justice, People's Movement of Serbia)	597	5.53	2
Dr. Miloš Jovanović–Hope for Royal Topola–Serbian Coalition NADA–National Democratic Alternative–New Democratic Party of Serbia (New DSS)–Movement for the Restoration of the Kingdom of Serbia (POKS)–Vojislav Mihailović	473	4.38	1
Serbian Party Oathkeepers–What the Serbian Peasant Believes–Topola Will Not Disappear	305	2.83	–
United Serbia–Dragan Marković Palma–At Home!	167	1.55	–
Total	10,792	100.00	41
Valid votes	10,792	97.45	
Invalid/blank votes	282	2.55	
Total votes	11,074	100.00	
Registered voters/turnout	17,489	63.32	

The Serbian Progressive Party's alliance formed a coalition government with the Socialist Party of Serbia after the election. Vladimir Radojković was chosen for another term as mayor, and Dragan Jovanović, who appeared in the lead position on the Progressive List, was named as president of the municipal assembly.

==== Trstenik ====
Incumbent Trstenik mayor Milena Turk of the Serbian Progressive Party resigned on 30 October 2023 to prompt a new election and was appointed as leader of a provisional authority.

The results of the election were as follows:

Party	Votes	%	Seats
Aleksandar Vučić–Trstenik Must Not Stop (Serbian Progressive Party, Social Democratic Party of Serbia, PUPS – Solidarity and Justice)	10,864	54.75	28
Šabac Against Violence–Miroslav Aleksić–Dr. Vladan Miodragović (Party of Freedom and Justice)	4,590	23.13	12
Ivica Dačić–Prime Minister of Serbia (Socialist Party of Serbia, United Serbia)	1,484	7.48	3
Dr. Miloš Jovanović–Hope for Trstenik–Serbian Coalition NADA–National Democratic Alternative–New Democratic Party of Serbia (New DSS)–Movement for the Restoration of the Kingdom of Serbia (POKS)–Vojislav Mihailović	1,362	6.86	3
Milica Đurđević Stamenkovski–Serbian Party Oathkeepers–To Victory	831	4.19	2
Serbian Movement Dveri–With Our Hearts for Trstenik	711	3.58	1
Total	19,842	100.00	49
Valid votes	19,842	96.18	
Invalid/blank votes	788	3.82	
Total votes	20,630	100.00	
Registered voters/turnout	34,218	60.29	

Milena Turk was chosen for another term as mayor after the election.

==== Ub ====
Incumbent Ub mayor Darko Glišić of the Serbian Progressive Party resigned in October 2023 in order to prompt a new election and was appointed as leader of a provisional authority. His fellow Progressive Party member Ivana Nikolić, who had served as speaker of the assembly in the previous term, was appointed as a member of the authority.

The results of the election were as follows:

Party	Votes	%	Seats
Aleksandar Vučić–Ub Must Not Stop (Serbian Progressive Party, PUPS – Solidarity and Justice)	10,055	68.66	21
New Face of Serbia–Miloš Parandilović	3,368	23.00	7
Ivica Dačić–Prime Minister of Serbia (Socialist Party of Serbia)	1,222	8.34	2
Total	14,645	100.00	30
Valid votes	14,645	96.83	
Invalid/blank votes	480	3.17	
Total votes	15,125	100.00	
Registered voters/turnout	22,636	66.82	

Darko Glišić was confirmed for another term as mayor after the election. Aleksandar Jovanović Džajić, also of the Progressive Party, was chosen for a fourth term as deputy mayor. Ivana Nikolić was elected from the fifth position on the Progressive Party's list and was confirmed afterward for another term as assembly speaker.

Glišić resigned as mayor on 10 May 2024 after being appointed as Serbia's minister for public investments. Aleksandar Jovanović Džajić was chosen as his successor on 7 June 2024, and Ivana Nikolić resigned as assembly speaker on the same day to become the new deputy mayor.

==== Varvarin ====
Incumbent Varvarin mayor Violeta Lutovac Đurđević of the Serbian Progressive Party resigned on 30 October 2023 to prompt a new election and was appointed as leader of a provisional authority.

Party	Votes	%	Seats
Aleksandar Vučić–Varvarin Must Not Stop (Serbian Progressive Party, PUPS – Solidarity and Justice)	4,508	55.05	20
Ivica Dačić–Prime Minister of Serbia (Socialist Party of Serbia, United Serbia)	1,247	15.23	5
People's Party For Our People–Dr. Gordana Čabrić	1,160	14.17	5
Professor Zoran Milenković Može Different for Our Municipality	833	10.17	3
Milica Đurđević Stamenkovski–Boško Obradović–National Gathering–State-Building Force–Serbian Party Oathkeepers–Serbian Movement Dveri	441	5.39	2
Total	8,189	100.00	35
Valid votes	8,189	96.48	
Invalid/blank votes	299	3.52	
Total votes	8,488	100.00	
Registered voters/turnout	14,824	57.26	

Violeta Lutovac Đurđević was confirmed for another term as mayor after the election.

==== Vladimirci ====
Incumbent Vladimirci mayor Goran Zarić of the Serbian Progressive Party resigned on 30 October 2023 to prompt a new election and was appointed as leader of a provisional authority.

Party	Votes	%	Seats
Aleksandar Vučić–Vladimirci Must Not Stop (Serbian Progressive Party, Serbian Radical Party)	5,057	59.05	16
Vladimirci Against Violence (Together, Party of Freedom and Justice, Democratic Party)	1,311	15.31	4
Ivica Dačić–Prime Minister of Serbia (Socialist Party of Serbia, United Serbia)	919	10.73	2
People's Movement of Serbia–Miroslav Aleksić Dr. Vladica Mirković–For a Better Vladimirci	678	7.92	2
Citizens' Group: Janko Đurić–United Opposition	599	6.99	1
Total	8,564	100.00	25
Valid votes	8,564	97.10	
Invalid/blank votes	256	2.90	
Total votes	8,820	100.00	
Registered voters/turnout	13,905	63.43	

Goran Zarić was confirmed for a new term as mayor after the election.

=== Southern and Eastern Serbia ===
==== Babušnica ====
Incumbent Babušnica mayor Ivana Stojičić of the Serbian Progressive Party resigned on 30 October 2023 to prompt a new local election and was appointed as leader of a provisional authority.

The results of the election were as follows:

Party	Votes	%	Seats
Aleksandar Vučić–Babušnica Must Not Stop (Serbian Progressive Party, PUPS – Solidarity and Justice, Movement of Socialists)	3,791	60.86	15
Ivica Dačić–Prime Minister of Serbia, Goran Dimitrijević–Mayor of the Municipality, SPS, SDPS, Democratic Party of Bulgarians (DPB)	1,754	28.16	6
People's Movement of Serbia–Babušnica Against Violence (People's Movement of Serbia, Enough is Enough)	423	6.79	1
Democratic Party–Babušnica Against Violence	261	4.19	1
Total	6,229	100.00	23
Valid votes	6,229	95.99	
Invalid/blank votes	260	4.01	
Total votes	6,489	100.00	
Registered voters/turnout	8,393	77.31	

Ivana Stojičić was confirmed for another term as mayor after the election.

==== Bela Palanka ====
Incumbent Bela Palanka mayor Goran Miljković of the Serbian Progressive Party resigned on 6 November 2023 to prompt a new local election and was appointed as leader of a provisional authority.

The results of the election were as follows:

Party	Votes	%	Seats
Aleksandar Vučić–Bela Palanka Must Not Stop (Serbian Progressive Party, PUPS – Solidarity and Justice)	4,806	70.52	22
Serbia Against Violence–Bela Palanka–Srđan Pavlović Pavle (Party of Freedom and Justice, People's Movement of Serbia, Democratic Party)	693	10.17	3
Ivica Dačić–Prime Minister of Serbia (Socialist Party of Serbia)	648	9.51	2
Citizens' Group: It's Time for Change–Marija Vasić (Voice of the Youth)	427	6.27	1
National Gathering, NADA for Bela Palanka, Serbian Movement Dveri, New Democratic Party of Serbia, Movement for the Restoration of the Kingdom of Serbia, Serbian Party Oathkeepers, Vojkan Popović	241	3.54	1
Total	6,815	100.00	29
Valid votes	6,815	96.22	
Invalid/blank votes	268	3.78	
Total votes	7,083	100.00	
Registered voters/turnout	8,639	81.99	

Goran Miljković was confirmed for another term in office after the election.

==== Dimitrovgrad ====
Incumbent Dimitrovgrad mayor Vladica Dimitrov of the Serbian Progressive Party resigned on 30 October 2023 to prompt a new local election and was appointed as leader of a provisional authority.

The results of the election were as follows:

Party	Votes	%	Seats
Aleksandar Vučić–Dimitrovgrad Must Not Stop (Serbian Progressive Party, Social Democratic Party of Serbia, PUPS – Solidarity and Justice)	2,606	49.52	15
Serbia Against Violence (Together)	880	16.72	5
Serbian Movement Dveri–With Heart for Dimitrovgrad–Boris Kolev	760	14.44	4
Ivica Dačić–Prime Minister of Serbia (Socialist Party of Serbia)	610	11.59	3
Democratic Party of Bulgarians–Nebojša Ivanov	407	7.73	2
Total	5,263	100.00	29
Valid votes	5,263	95.88	
Invalid/blank votes	226	4.12	
Total votes	5,489	100.00	
Registered voters/turnout	7,960	68.96	

Vladica Dimitrov was confirmed for another term as mayor in January 2024.

==== Doljevac ====
Incumbent Doljevac mayor Goran Ljubić of the Serbian Progressive Party resigned on 30 October 2023 to prompt a new local election and was appointed as leader of a provisional authority.

The results of the election were as follows:

Party	Votes	%	Seats
Aleksandar Vučić–Doljevac Must Not Stop (Serbian Progressive Party, PUPS – Solidarity and Justice, Serbian Radical Party, Social Democratic Party of Serbia)	8,594	81.61	31
United Serbia–Dragan Marković Palma	1,088	10.33	3
Ivica Dačić–Prime Minister of Serbia (Socialist Party of Serbia)	849	8.06	3
Total	10,531	100.00	37
Valid votes	10,531	94.94	
Invalid/blank votes	561	5.06	
Total votes	11,092	100.00	
Registered voters/turnout	13,913	79.72	

Goran Ljubić was confirmed for another term as mayor after the election.

==== Gadžin Han ====
Incumbent Gadžin Han mayor Milisav Filipović of the Serbian Progressive Party resigned in late 2023 to prompt a new local election and was appointed as leader of a provisional authority.

The results of the election were as follows:

Party	Votes	%	Seats
Aleksandar Vučić–Gadžin Han Must Not Stop (Serbian Progressive Party, United Peasant Party)	2,631	61.96	17
Ivica Dačić–Prime Minister of Serbia (Socialist Party of Serbia)	614	14.46	3
Citizens' Group: Zaplanje Must Not Disappear	379	8.93	2
United Serbia–Dragan Marković Palma–Let's Revitalize Zaplanje	326	7.68	2
Milica Đurđević Stamenkovski–Boško Obradović–National Gathering–State-Building Force–Serbian Party Oathkeepers–Serbian Movement Dveri	296	6.97	1
Total	4,246	100.00	25
Valid votes	4,246	96.98	
Invalid/blank votes	132	3.02	
Total votes	4,378	100.00	
Registered voters/turnout	5,674	77.16	

Milisav Filipović was confirmed for another term as mayor after the election.

==== Merošina ====
Incumbent Merošina mayor Saša Jovanović of the Serbian Progressive Party resigned in late 2023 to prompt a new local election and was appointed as leader of a provisional authority.

The results of the election were as follows:

Party	Votes	%	Seats
Aleksandar Vučić–Merošina Must Not Stop (Serbian Progressive Party, PUPS – Solidarity and Justice)	5,149	68.26	22
Sanja Miladinović–Democratic Party	903	11.97	4
Ivica Dačić–Prime Minister of Serbia (Socialist Party of Serbia)	617	8.18	2
United Serbia–Dragan Marković Palma	472	6.26	2
People's Movement of Serbia–Miroslav Miki Aleksić	402	5.33	1
Total	7,543	100.00	31
Valid votes	7,543	97.12	
Invalid/blank votes	224	2.88	
Total votes	7,767	100.00	
Registered voters/turnout	9,949	78.07	

Saša Jovanović was confirmed for another term as mayor after the election.

Sanja Miladinović was elected from the lead position on the Democratic Party's list.

==== Pirot ====
Incumbent Pirot mayor Vladan Vasić resigned on 31 October 2023 to prompt a new election and was appointed as leader of a provisional assembly.

The results of the election were as follows:

Party	Votes	%	Seats
Aleksandar Vučić–Pirot Must Not Stop (Serbian Progressive Party, Social Democratic Party of Serbia, Movement of Socialists, PUPS – Solidarity and Justice)	15,202	51.40	29
Citizens' Group: Pirot Against Violence–Darko Božić, Dr. Žarko Todorović, Čedica Džunić, Voice of Pirot, Best for Pirot, Ecological Uprising–Ćuta	10,258	34.68	20
Ivica Dačić–Prime Minister of Serbia (Socialist Party of Serbia)	2,729	9.23	5
Let's Unite Pirot–POKS–Oathkeepers	1,386	4.69	2
Total	29,575	100.00	56
Valid votes	29,575	97.08	
Invalid/blank votes	890	2.92	
Total votes	30,465	100.00	
Registered voters/turnout	45,408	67.09	

Vladan Vasić was confirmed for another term as mayor on 7 February 2024.

==== Ražanj ====
Incumbent Ražanj mayor Dobrica Stojković of the Serbian Progressive Party resigned on 30 October 2023 to prompt a new election and was appointed as leader of a provisional authority.

The results of the election were as follows:

Party	Votes	%	Seats
Aleksandar Vučić–Ražanj Must Not Stop (Serbian Progressive Party, PUPS – Solidarity and Justice)	2,652	62.21	18
Citizens' Group: Velibor Brkić "Velja"–For the Village to Survive and the Youth to Remain	812	19.05	5
Citizens' Group: To Save the Municipality of Ražanj	519	12.17	3
Ivica Dačić–Prime Minister of Serbia (Socialist Party of Serbia)	280	6.57	1
Total	4,263	100.00	27
Valid votes	4,263	97.26	
Invalid/blank votes	120	2.74	
Total votes	4,383	100.00	
Registered voters/turnout	6,049	72.46	

Dobrica Stojković was confirmed for another term as mayor after the election.

==== Smederevo ====
Incumbent Smederevo mayor Jovan Beč of the Serbian Progressive Party resigned on 30 October 2023 to prompt a new election. Jasmina Vojinović, also of the Progressive Party, was chosen as leader of a provisional authority.

In November 2022, citizens group AZS, and opposition parties DS, Narodna, and ZS, announced their joint participation in the local election in Smederevo. Jovan Beč, the mayor of Smederevo, resigned on 28 September 2023, triggering a snap election.

Nine electoral lists successfully submitted their nominations, three of which were from the local citizens' groups.

The results of the election were as follows:

Party	Votes	%	Seats
Aleksandar Vučić–Smederevo Must Not Stop (Serbian Progressive Party, PUPS – Solidarity and Justice, Serbian Radical Party)	23,677	46.64	34
Smederevo Against Violence–Nikola Beronja (Party of Freedom and Justice, People's Movement of Serbia, Democratic Party)	5,979	11.78	8
Citizens' Group: Dr. Ivan Stevanović–For Our Smederevo	5,257	10.35	7
Ivica Dačić–Prime Minister of Serbia (Socialist Party of Serbia, United Serbia)	4,195	8.26	6
Citizens' Group: Andreja Pavlović Profa–Think Differently	3,046	6.00	4
Citizens' Group: Let's Be the Smederevo We Hope For–Professor Nebojša Jovanović Neba and Dejan Pirić	2,384	4.70	3
Dr. Miloš Jovanović–Hope for Smederevo–Serbian Coalition NADA–National Democratic Alternative–New Democratic Party of Serbia (New DSS)–Movement for the Restoration of the Kingdom of Serbia (POKS)–Vojislav Mihailović	2,363	4.65	3
Citizens' Group: God–Family–Smederevo–Doctor Goran Kuljanin	2,264	4.46	3
Serbian Movement Dveri–Boško Obradović	1,604	3.16	2
Total	50,769	100.00	70
Valid votes	50,769	96.90	
Invalid/blank votes	1,626	3.10	
Total votes	52,395	100.00	
Registered voters/turnout	94,957	55.18	

Jasmina Vojinović was confirmed as mayor after the election. The local government was formed by the Serbian Progressive Party's alliance, the Socialist Party of Serbia's alliance, and the God–Family–Smederevo group.

==== Velika Plana ====
Incumbent mayor Velika Plana mayor Igor Matković of the Serbian Progressive Party resigned on 30 October 2023 to prompt a new election and was appointed as leader of a provisional authority.

The results of the election were as follows:

Party	Votes	%	Seats
Aleksandar Vučić–Velika Plana Must Not Stop (Serbian Progressive Party, Serbian Radical Party, PUPS – Solidarity and Justice)	10,246	54.65	23
Dr. Miloš Jovanović–Hope for Velika Plana–Serbian Coalition NADA–National Democratic Alternative–New Democratic Party of Serbia (New DSS)–Movement for the Restoration of the Kingdom of Serbia (POKS)–Vojislav Mihailović	2,760	14.72	6
Serbia Against Violence–Miroslav Miki Aleksić–Marinika Tepić (Democratic Party, Party of Freedom and Justice, People's Movement of Serbia)	2,084	11.12	4
"Ivica Dačić–Prime Minister of Serbia" (Socialist Party of Serbia)	1,709	9.12	4
Milica Đurđević Stamenkovski–Boško Obradović–National Gathering for Velika Plana–Serbian Movement Dveri–Serbian Party Oathkeepers–New Face of Serbia	783	4.18	1
Citizens' Group: Velika Plana Can Do Better–Vojkan Stević	674	3.60	1
United Serbia–Dragan Marković Palma–At Home!	492	2.62	–
Total	18,748	100.00	39
Valid votes	18,748	96.52	
Invalid/blank votes	676	3.48	
Total votes	19,424	100.00	
Registered voters/turnout	35,536	54.66	

Strahinja Pavešković of the Serbian Progressive Party was chosen as mayor after the election.

Former mayor Dejan Šulkić of the Democratic Party of Serbia was re-elected to the assembly from the lead position on the National Democratic Alternative list.
