= Visak (disambiguation) =

Visak is a village in Iran:

Visak may also refer to:

== People ==
- Ivan Višak (born 1993), Croatian motorcycle racer
- Tatjana Višak (born 1974), German philosopher

== Other uses ==
- Visak (Serbia), hill in Serbia
