= Dragana Lukić =

Serbian politician

- Драгана Лукић

Mayor of Loznica
- Incumbent
- Assumed office 8 November 2024
- Preceded by: Vidoje Petrović

Member of the National Assembly of the Republic of Serbia
- In office 1 August 2022 – 8 November 2024

Personal details
- Born: 19 January 1988 (age 38) Loznica, SR Serbia, SFR Yugoslavia
- Party: SNS

Dragana Lukić (Serbian Cyrillic: Драгана Лукић; born 19 January 1988) is a Serbian politician who has been the mayor of Loznica since November 2024. Previously, she served in the Serbian national assembly from 2022 to 2024. Lukić is a member of the Serbian Progressive Party (SNS).

== Early life and career ==
Lukić was born in Loznica, in what was then the Socialist Republic of Serbia in the Socialist Federal Republic of Yugoslavia. She holds a bachelor's degree and a master's degree from the University of Belgrade, where she studied in the Faculty of Defectology, and completed one further year of studies at the Belgrade Institute of Mental Health, where she focused on support and integration for people with developmental disabilities. For nine years, she worked at an elementary school in the village of Lešnica.

== Politician ==
Lukić appeared in the twenty-fifth position on the Progressive Party's electoral list for the Loznica city assembly in the 2020 Serbian local elections and was elected when the list won a majority victory with forty-three out of fifty-nine seats.

=== Parliamentarian ===
Lukić was given the one hundredth position on the SNS's list in the 2022 Serbian parliamentary election and was elected when the list won a plurality victory with 120 out of 250 seats. The Progressives remained the dominant force in Serbia's government after the election, and Lukić supported the ministry in the assembly. In her first term, Lukić served on the labour committee (Note: Formally known as the Committee on Labour, Social Affairs, Social Inclusion, and Poverty Reduction.) and was a member of 130 different parliamentary friendship groups. (Note: She was a member of the friendship groups with Albania, Argentina, Armenia, Australia, Austria, Azerbaijan, the Bahamas, Bangladesh, Belarus, Belgium, Bhutan, Bosnia and Herzegovina, Botswana, Brazil, Bulgaria, Burundi, Cambodia, Cameroon, Cape Verde, the Caribbean countries (Antigua and Barbuda, Barbados, Belize, Dominica, Haiti, Saint Kitts and Nevis, Saint Lucia), Chile, China, Colombia, Comoros, Costa Rica, Croatia, Cuba, the Czech Republic, the Democratic Republic of the Congo, Denmark, Djibouti, the Dominican Republic, Ecuador, El Salvador, Equatorial Guinea, Eritrea, Eswatini, Ethiopia, Finland, France, Gabon, the Gambia, Georgia, Germany, Greece, Grenada, Guatemala, Guinea-Bissau, Guyana, Honduras, Hungary, Iceland, Indonesia, Ireland, Israel, Italy, Jamaica, Japan, Jordan, Kuwait, Kyrgyzstan, Laos, Latvia, Lesotho, Liberia, Libya, Liechtenstein, Luxembourg, Madagascar, Malaysia, the Maldives, Mali, Malta, Mauritius, Micronesia, Mongolia, Montenegro, Morocco, Mozambique, Myanmar, Namibia, the Netherlands, New Zealand and the Pacific Island States (Fiji, Nauru, Palau, Papua New Guinea, the Solomon Islands, Tuvalu, Vanuatu), Nicaragua, North Macedonia, Norway, Oman, Pakistan, Palestine, Panama, Paraguay, Peru, Portugal, Qatar, the Republic of Congo, Romania, Russia, Rwanda, Sao Tome and Principe, Saudi Arabia, Saint Vincent and the Grenadines, Senegal, Sierra Leone, Slovakia, Slovenia, South Sudan, the countries of Southeast Asia (Brunei Darussalam, Singapore, Thailand, Timor-Leste), Spain, Sri Lanka, the countries of Sub-Saharan Africa, Sudan, Suriname, Sweden, Switzerland, Syria, Tajikistan, Togo, Trinidad and Tobago, Turkmenistan, Turkey, Uganda, Ukraine, the United Arab Emirates, the United Kingdom, the United States of America, Uruguay, Uzbekistan, Vietnam, Zambia, and Zimbabwe.)

She was promoted to the fifty-eighth position on the SNS's list in the 2023 parliamentary election and was re-elected when the list won a majority victory with 129 seats. In her second term, she once again served on the labour committee and was a deputy member of the committee on human and minority rights and gender equality, the committee for the diaspora and Serbs in the region, and the committee on the rights of the child. She was a member of the friendship groups with Austria, Belarus, Bosnia and Herzegovina, the Caribbean countries (Antigua and Barbuda, the Bahamas, Barbados, Belize, Dominica, Dominican Republic, Grenada, Haiti, Panama, Saint Kitts and Nevis, Saint Lucia, Saint Vincent and the Grenadines, Trinidad and Tobago), China, Comoros, Cuba, the Democratic Republic of the Congo, Eritrea, Eswatini, Greece, Hungary, Japan, Mali, Nicaragua, Norway, Russia, Sao Tome and Principe, Spain, and Syria, as well as the friendship group with Australia, New Zealand, and the Pacific Islands states (Fiji, Nauru, Palau, Papua New Guinea, the Solomon Islands, Tuvalu, Vanuatu).

She was also promoted to the sixth position on the SNS's list for the Loznica city assembly in the 2023 Serbian local elections, which took place concurrently with the parliamentary vote, and was re-elected when the list won thirty-four seats.

=== Mayor of Loznica ===
Loznica's longtime mayor Vidoje Petrović submitted his resignation in October 2024. On 8 November 2024, Lukić was chosen as his successor. She resigned from the national assembly on the same day, as she could not hold a dual mandate as mayor and a member of parliament.
