= Trska =

- Village
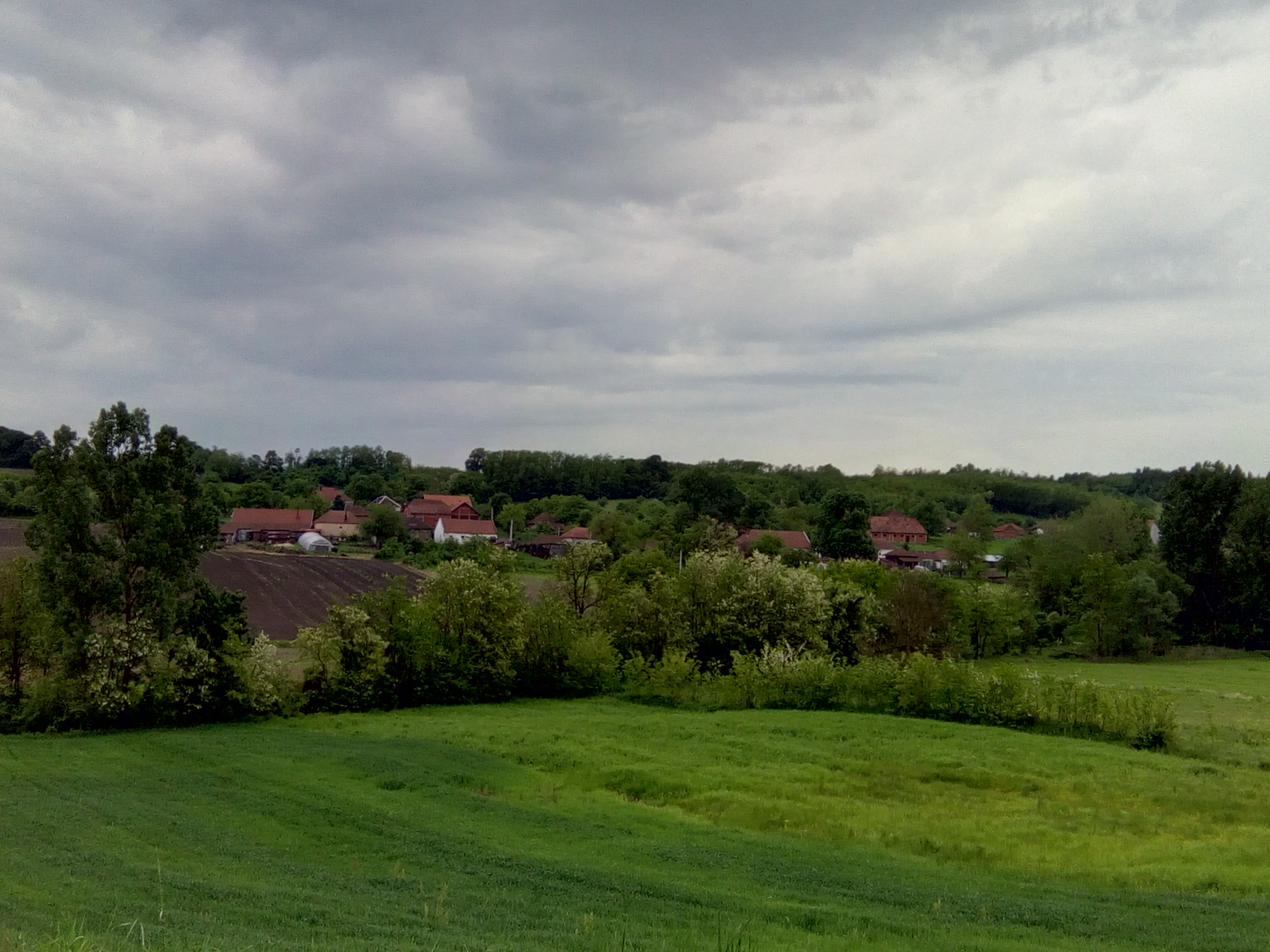

- Location within Serbia
- Coordinates: 44°10′32″N 21°03′10″E
- Country: Serbia
- District: Šumadija District
- Municipality: Rača

Population (2002)
  - Total: 389
- Time zone: UTC+1 (CET)
  - Summer (DST): UTC+2 (CEST)

Trska is a village in the municipality of Rača, Serbia. According to the 2002 census, the village has a population of 389 people.
