= Borci =

Coordinates: 44.2000°N 20.9833°E

- Village
- Interactive map of Borci
- Country: Serbia
- District: Šumadija District
- Municipality: Rača

Population (2002)
  - Total: 389
- Time zone: UTC+1 (CET)
  - Summer (DST): UTC+2 (CEST)

Borci (Serbian: Борци) is a village in the municipality of Rača, Serbia. According to the 2002 census, the village has a population of 389 people.
