= Donje Jarušice =

- Village
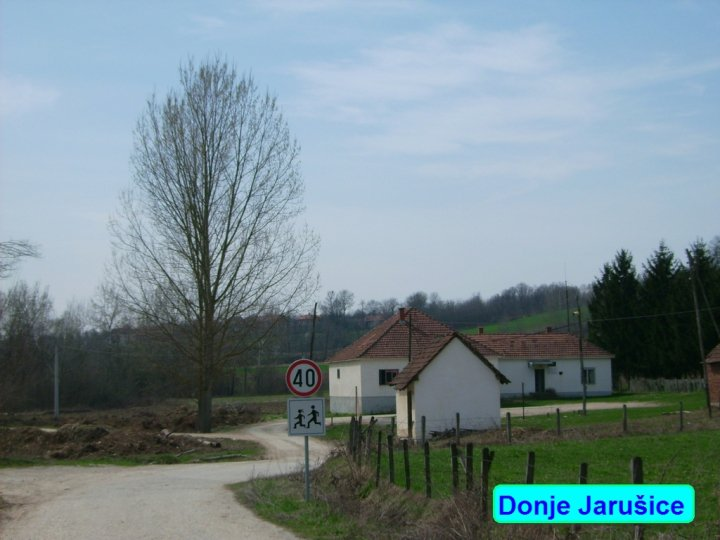
- View of Donje Jarušice

- Location within Serbia
- Coordinates: 44°11′N 20°52′E
- Country: Serbia
- District: Šumadija District
- Municipality: Rača

Population (2002)
  - Total: 265
- Time zone: UTC+1 (CET)
  - Summer (DST): UTC+2 (CEST)

Donje Jarušice (Serbian: Доње Јарушице) is a village in the municipality of Rača, Serbia. According to the 2002 census, the village has a population of 265 people.
