= Nikola Nešić =

Serbian politician (born 1988)

- Никола Нешић

Member of the National Assembly of the Republic of Serbia
- In office 1 August 2022 – 6 February 2024

Personal details
- Born: 1988 Kragujevac, Yugoslavia
- Party: Nova Snaga(2014–2021); Together for Serbia; (2021–2022); Together; (2022–present)
- Occupation: Politician

Nikola Nešić (Serbian Cyrillic: Никола Нешић; born 1988) is a Serbian politician. He served in the National Assembly of Serbia from 2022 to 2024 and is now an opposition leader in the city assembly of Kragujevac. Nešić is a member of the Together party.

== Early life and private career ==
Nešić was born in Kragujevac, in what was then the Socialist Republic of Serbia in the Socialist Federal Republic of Yugoslavia. Raised in the city, he holds a master's degree in electrical engineering and computing from the Department of Telecommunications at the Faculty of Electronics in Niš and has worked at Serbia Broadband.

== Career ==
=== Early years in local politics ===
Nešić co-founded the local party New Strength in Kragujevac in 2014 and was recognized as its leader. The party appeared in the 2016 local election in Kragujevac on the electoral list of Boris Tadić's Social Democratic Party (SDS), and Nešić appeared in the seventh list position. The list won six seats, and he was not immediately elected. He received a mandate on 6 June 2016 as the replacement for another candidate. Some SDS delegates left the party soon after the election to join the governing coalition led by the rival Serbian Progressive Party (SNS). In an article published the following year, Nešić wrote of this situation, and his general experience working with the SDS, in an article published the following year.

New Strength appeared in the 2020 Serbian local elections in Kragujevac on an independent coalition list called Alternativa. Nešić received the second position on the list and was re-elected when it won four mandates. In June 2021, it collectively joined Action (Akcija), a citizens' initiative established by the party Together for Serbia (ZZS). The following month, New Strength joined Together for Serbia outright.

=== Parliamentarian ===
Together for Serbia and Action contested the 2022 Serbian parliamentary election as part of the We Must(Moramo) coalition. Nešić was awarded the fifth position on the coalition's electoral list and was elected when it won thirteen mandates. Shortly after the vote, Together for Serbia and "Action" merged into a new party called Together. SNS and its allies won the election, and Nešić served as a member of the opposition.

During his parliamentary term, Nešić was a member of the spatial planning committee, (Note: Formally known as the Committee on the Spatial Planning, Transport, Infrastructure, and Telecommunications.) a deputy member of the economy committee, (Note: Formally known as the Committee on the Economy, Regional Development, Trade, Tourism, and Energy) a deputy member of Serbia's delegation to the Parliamentary Assembly of the Mediterranean, and a member of thirty-six parliamentary friendship groups. (Note: He was a member of the friendship groups with Australia, Austria, Belarus, Brazil, China, Cuba, the Czech Republic, Egypt, Finland, Georgia, Germany, Greece, Iran, Ireland, Israel, Japan, Kazakhstan, Kuwait, Libya, Malta, Mauritius, Norway, Palestine, Poland, Russia, Saudi Arabia, Slovakia, Spain, Switzerland, Syria, Turkey, Ukraine, the United Arab Emirates, the United Kingdom, the United States of America, and Venezuela.)

=== Local politics since 2023 ===
In the 2023 Serbian local elections, Nešić led a coalition list in Kragujevac of Together, Serbia Centre (SRCE), Ecological Uprising (EU), the Green–Left Front (ZLF), and Šumadija Region. He was elected to a third term when the list won six seats. The SNS and its allies won the election, and he now serves in opposition as the leader of the New Strength KG–Together, Šumadija Region assembly group.

Nešić strongly criticized the city's development strategy in May 2024, accusing the governing coalition of squandering an important opportunity by bringing forward a document filled with errors and illogical proposals.
