= Slađana Radisavljević =

Serbian politician

- Слађана Радисављевић

Member of the National Assembly of the Republic of Serbia
- Incumbent
- Assumed office 6 February 2024

Personal details
- Party: NDSS (formerly DSS)

Slađana Radisavljević (Serbian Cyrillic: Слађана Радисављевић; born 1968) is a Serbian politician. She has served in the National Assembly of Serbia since February 2024 as a member of the New Democratic Party of Serbia (NDSS).

== Private career ==
Radisavljević is a mathematics teacher living in Kragujevac.

== Politician ==
=== City delegate (2012) ===
Radisavljević entered political life as a member of the Democratic Party of Serbia (DSS). She was first elected to the Kragujevac city assembly in the 2012 Serbian local elections, in which the DSS won five seats. The DSS originally supported Veroljub Stevanović's administration in the city after the election. On 8 June 2012, Radisavljević was appointed to the city's planning and construction committee. She resigned her seat on 7 December 2012.

=== 2014 to 2023 ===
Radisavljević appeared in the ninety-ninth position on the DSS's electoral list in the 2014 Serbian parliamentary election. This was too low a position for election to be a realistic possibility, and the list did not cross the electoral threshold in any event.

For the 2016 parliamentary election, the DSS formed an electoral alliance with Dveri. Radisavljević appeared in the eightieth position on their combined list and was not elected when the list won thirteen seats. She also appeared in the third position on a DSS–Dveri list in Kragujevac for the concurrent 2016 Serbian local elections; this list did not cross the electoral threshold.

The DSS contested the 2020 parliamentary election at the head of the METLA coalition. Radisavljević appeared in the forty-fourth position on the coalition's list at the republic level and in the fourth position on its list for Kragujevac in the concurrent 2020 local elections. The coalition failed to cross the threshold at either level.

In 2021, the DSS became a founding member of the National Democratic Alternative (NADA) coalition. Radisavljević received the eighteenth position on the alliance's list in the 2022 parliamentary election and missed election when the list won fifteen seats. Shortly after the election, the Democratic Party of Serbia changed its name to the New Democratic Party of Serbia. When new elections were called in 2023, Radisavljević was the next NDSS candidate in sequence to enter the assembly in the event of a vacancy.

=== Parliamentarian (2024–present) ===
Radisavljević was promoted to the fifth position on the NADA list in the 2023 Serbian parliamentary election and was elected to her first assembly term when the list won thirteen seats. The Serbian Progressive Party (SNS) and its allies won the election, the NADA delegates serve in opposition. Radisavljević is now a member of the committee on human and minority rights and gender equality and a deputy member of the health and family committee, the committee on the rights of the child, and the committee on education, science, technological development, and the information society.

She was also re-elected to the Kragujevac city assembly in the concurrent 2023 Serbian local elections. In Kragujevac, the NADA parties appeared on a coalition list led by former mayor Veroljub Stevanović that also included the main parties of the Serbia Against Violence (SPN) coalition. Radisavljević appeared in the fourth position and was elected when the list won fourteen mandates, finishing second against the SNS alliance. She resigned her seat in the city assembly in February 2024, saying that she wanted to focus on her work as a parliamentarian.
