= Sanja Miladinović =

Serbian politician

Sanja Miladinović (Serbian Cyrillic: Сања Миладиновић; born 8 November 1980) is a Serbian politician. She was the president (i.e., speaker) of the Merošina municipal assembly in 2012 and served in the National Assembly of Serbia from 2022 to 2024. Miladinović is a member of the Democratic Party (DS).

== Private career ==
Miladinović has a bachelor's degree and a master's degree in education and has worked as a primary school teacher. She is the author of the book, Ekološko obrazovanje u osnovnoj školi (English: Environmental Education in Primary School).

== Politician ==
=== Local politics in Merošina (2004–2020) ===
The 2004 Serbian local elections resulted in an extremely fragmented local assembly in Merošina, with the municipality's thirty-seven seats being divided among ten political groupings. The Democratic Party won two seats and afterward participated in the local coalition government. Miladinović was one of her party's assembly representatives. Available online sources do not confirm the point, but is likely that she served a second term following the 2008 local elections, in which the DS won three seats in the municipality.

The Democratic Party won eight seats in Merošina in the 2012 local elections, finishing a close second against the Socialist Party of Serbia (SPS). The SPS, DS, and United Regions of Serbia (URS) formed a coalition government after the election, and Miladinović, who was by this time the leader of the local DS organization, became speaker of the assembly. Her term in office was relatively short; in December 2012, a new local coalition of the URS and the Serbian Progressive Party (SNS) came to power, and she was removed as speaker by a vote of twenty-one to fifteen. The local government remained unstable, and the DS briefly returned to power in April 2016 in coalition with a dissident group of local Progressives.

Miladinović led the DS's electoral list for Merošina the 2016 local elections and was re-elected when the party won two seats. The Serbian Progressive Party formed a new government after the election, and the DS served in opposition. Her term ended in August 2019, when the local assembly was dissolved and an interim administration was established.

The DS and other opposition parties began boycotting Serbia's political institutions in 2019, charging that the Serbian president Aleksandar Vučić and the SNS were undermining the country's democratic foundations. The DS did not participate in the 2020 Serbian local elections.

=== Parliamentarian (2022–24) ===
Miladinović appeared in the 159th position on the Democratic Party's Choice for a Better Life list in the 2012 Serbian parliamentary election. This was too low a position for election to be a realistic prospect, and she was not elected when the list won sixty-seven seats. She later appeared in the seventy-second position on the DS's list in the 2014 parliamentary election and the 125th position in the 2016 parliamentary election; the party's coalitions won nineteen and sixteen seats in these elections, respectively, and she was again not elected. The DS boycotted the 2020 parliamentary election.

For the 2022 Serbian parliamentary election, the DS joined United for the Victory of Serbia, a broad coalition of opposition parties. Miladinović appeared in the forty-fifth position on the coalition's list and was not immediately elected when the coalition won thirty-eight mandates. She was, however, awarded a mandate on 25 October 2022 as a replacement for Olivera Lazović, who had resigned. Her term formally began the following day. The SNS and its allies won the 2022 election, and Miladinović served in opposition. She was the only delegate from Merošina in this sitting of the assembly and one of a comparatively small number of delegates from the south of Serbia generally. After receiving a mandate, she said that she would advocate for decentralization, the direct election of mayors, an end to closed list proportional representation, the annulment of a recent decision to shut down the JKP Hammeum in Prokuplje, and an end to the "alienation" of Niš's airport. She was the leader of Serbia's parliamentary friendship group with South Sudan.

Miladinović was not a candidate in the 2023 parliamentary election, and her term ended when the new assembly convened in February 2024.

=== Return to local politics (2023–present) ===
Miladinović led the Democratic Party's electoral list for Merošina in the 2023 Serbian local elections and was elected when the party won four mandates. The SNS and its allies won the election, and the DS serves in opposition.

In early 2024, Miladinović played a leading role in re-establishing a local branch of the Democratic Party in Niš.
