= Dragan Aćimović =

Serbian politician

- Драган Аћимовић

Member of the National Assembly of the Republic of Serbia
- In office 11 June 2008 – 31 May 2012

Personal details
- Born: 3 September 1976 (age 49) Šabac, SR Serbia, SFR Yugoslavia
- Party: SRS

Dragan Aćimović (Serbian Cyrillic: Драган Аћимовић; born 3 September 1976) is a Serbian politician. He served in the Serbian national assembly from 2008 to 2012, was the deputy mayor of Bogatić from 2008 to 2010, and is currently the deputy speaker of the Bogatić municipal assembly. Aćimović is a member of the far-right Serbian Radical Party (SRS).

== Early life and career ==
Aćimović was born in Šabac, in what was then the Socialist Republic of Serbia in the Socialist Federal Republic of Yugoslavia. He is a private entrepreneur living in Bogatić.

== Politician ==
=== Parliamentarian and deputy mayor ===
Aćimović appeared in the 202nd position (out of 250) on the Radical Party's electoral list in the 2008 Serbian parliamentary election. The list won seventy-eight seats, and he was chosen afterward for an assembly mandate. (From 2000 to 2011, Serbian parliamentary mandates were awarded to sponsoring parties or coalitions rather than to individual candidates, and it was common practice for the mandates to be assigned out of numerical order. Aćimović's low position on the list had no formal bearing on his chances of election.) The overall results of the election were inconclusive, and the Radicals initially held discussions with the Socialist Party of Serbia (SPS) and the Democratic Party of Serbia (DSS) about forming a new coalition government. The talks were not successful; Socialists instead joined a coalition government led by the For a European Serbia (ZES) alliance, and the Radicals served in opposition. During his parliamentary term, Aćimović was a member of the industry committee and the parliamentary friendship group with Romania.

The Radical Party won nine out of thirty-one seats in the Bogatić municipal assembly in the 2008 Serbian local elections, which were held concurrently with the parliamentary elections. Notwithstanding events at the republic level, the Radicals, Socialists, and DSS formed a coalition government in Bogatić, with Radenko Petrić of the Socialists as mayor and Aćimović as deputy mayor.

The Radical Party experienced a serious split in late 2008, with several members joining the more moderate Serbian Progressive Party (SNS) under the leadership of Tomislav Nikolić and Aleksandar Vučić. Aćimović remained with the Radicals.

A new coalition government came to power in Bogatić in August 2010. The Radicals moved into opposition, and Aćimović's term as deputy mayor came to an end.

Serbia's electoral laws were reformed in 2011, such that all parliamentary mandates were awarded to candidates on successful lists in numerical order. Aćimović appeared in the eighty-second position on the Radical Party's list in the 2012 Serbian parliamentary election. Weakened by the split four years earlier, the party fell below the electoral threshold for assembly representation, and Aćimović lost his seat. The Radicals also fell below the threshold in Bogatić in the concurrent 2012 local elections.

=== Since 2012 ===
Aćimović appeared in the eighty-third position on the Radical Party's list in the 2016 Serbian parliamentary election. The list won twenty-two seats, and he was not elected. The Radicals also won two seats in Bogatić in the concurrent 2016 Serbian local elections; online accounts do not clarify if Aćimović was among the candidates elected, but this is the most probable scenario.

He led the SRS list for Bogatić in the 2020 local elections and was re-elected when the list again won two seats. The Progressives won the election and formed a new local coalition that included the Radicals, and Aćimović was chosen as deputy speaker of the local assembly.

Aćimović appeared in the eleventh position on the SRS list in the 2022 parliamentary election and the tenth position in the 2023 parliamentary election. In both instances, the party fell below the electoral threshold. Addressing the Russian invasion of Ukraine in the 2022 election, he said that the Radical Party was not against Ukraine or the Ukrainian people, but added, "The problem is that they receive instructions from the US and the European Union, or NATO, and we know very well what NATO and their countries did to us in 1999 and caused us great material damage." In 2023, Aćimović argued that Serbia should join the BRICS alliance instead of the European Union.

The Bogatić municipal assembly was dissolved in October 2023 for early local elections coinciding with that year's parliamentary vote. Aćimović was appointed as a member of the provisional authority that governed Bogatić pending the formation of a new local government. He once again led the SRS list for the 2023 local elections and was re-elected when the list once again won two seats. The Progressives won a narrow one-seat majority in the local assembly and afterward formed a new coalition with the Radicals, and Aćimović was appointed to another term as deputy speaker.
