= Ivana Nikolić =

Serbian politician

- Ивана Николић

Deputy Mayor of Ub
- Incumbent
- Assumed office 7 June 2024
- Preceded by: Aleksandar Jovanović Džajić

Member of the National Assembly of the Republic of Serbia
- In office 3 June 2016 – 10 June 2024

Personal details
- Born: 1989 (age 36–37) Valjevo, SR Serbia, SFR Yugoslavia
- Party: SNS

Ivana Nikolić (Serbian Cyrillic: Ивана Николић; born 1989) is a Serbian politician who has been the deputy mayor of Ub since June 2024. She was previously a member of Serbia's national assembly from 2016 to 2024 and was president (i.e., speaker) of the Ub municipal assembly on an almost uninterrupted basis from 2020 to 2024. Nikolić is a member of Serbian Progressive Party (SNS).

She is not to be confused with another Serbian politician named Ivana Nikolić, also from the Serbian Progressive Party, who has been the mayor of New Belgrade since July 2024.

== Private career ==
Nikolić was born in Valjevo, in what was then the Socialist Republic of Serbia in the Socialist Federal Republic of Yugoslavia. She attended elementary school in Ub and secondary school in Belgrade. Nikolić holds a master of engineering degree in from the University of Belgrade Faculty of Transport and Traffic Engineering and is working toward a Ph.D. from the same institution.

== Politician ==
=== Parliamentarian ===
Nikolić received the eighty-first position on the Progressive Party's Serbia Is Winning electoral list in the 2016 Serbian parliamentary election and was elected when the list won a majority victory with 131 out of 250 mandates. In the parliament that followed, she was a member of the environmental protection committee, a deputy member of the spatial planning committee (Note: Formally known as the Committee on Spatial Planning, Transport, Infrastructure, and Telecommunications.) and the European integration committee, and a member of the parliamentary friendship groups with Austria, Azerbaijan, Belarus, Bolivia, China, France, Georgia, Germany, Kazakhstan, Morocco, Russia, Slovenia, Sweden, and Switzerland.

She was promoted to the eighth position on the Progressive Party's list in the 2020 parliamentary election and was re-elected when the list won a landslide majority with 188 mandates. In her second term, she was a member of the administrative committee (Note: Formally known as the Committee on Administrative, Budgetary, Mandate, and Immunity Issues.) and the spatial planning committee, a deputy member of the committee on human and minority rights and gender equality, a member of Serbia's delegation to the Parliamentary Assembly of the Mediterranean, the head of Serbia's parliamentary friendship group with Ghana, and a member of fifty-two other friendship groups. (Note: She was a member of the friendship groups with Angola, Argentina, Armenia, Australia, Austria, Azerbaijan, Belarus, Brazil, Bulgaria, China, Cuba, Cyprus, Egypt, Ethiopia, Finland, Fiji, France, Germany, Greece, Hungary, India, Iran, Iraq, Ireland, Israel, Italy, Japan, Kazakhstan, Malta, Mexico, Moldova, Morocco, Myanmar, the Netherlands, North Macedonia, Norway, Palestine, the Philippines, Poland, Portugal, Qatar, Russia, Spain, Sweden, Switzerland, Tunisia, Turkey, the United Arab Emirates, the United Kingdom, the United States of America, Venezuela, and Vietnam.)

Nikolić was given the thirty-sixth position on the SNS's list in the 2022 parliamentary election and was elected to a third term when the list won a plurality victory with 120 mandates. She again served on the spatial planning committee and was a deputy member of the committee on the diaspora and Serbs in the region, a deputy member of Serbia's delegation to the Parliamentary Assembly of the Mediterranean, the leader of Serbia's parliamentary friendship group with the Democratic Republic of the Congo, and a member of fifty-seven other friendship groups. (Note: She was a member of the friendship groups with Angola, Argentina, Armenia, Australia, Austria, Azerbaijan, Bosnia and Herzegovina, Brazil, Bulgaria, China, Cuba, Cyprus, Egypt, Estonia, Ethiopia, Finland, France, Germany, Ghana, Greece, Hungary, India, Iran, Iraq, Israel, Italy, Japan, Kazakhstan, Latvia, Lithuania, Malawi, Malta, the Mexico, Moldova, Morocco, Myanmar, Netherlands, New Zealand and the Pacific Ocean Countries (Fiji, Nauru, Palau, Papua New Guinea, the Solomon Islands, Tuvalu, Vanuatu), North Macedonia, Norway, Palestine, the Philippines, Poland, Portugal, Qatar, Russia, South Korea, Spain, Sweden, Switzerland, Tunisia, Turkey, the United Arab Emirates, the United Kingdom, the United States, Venezuela, and Vietnam.)

In the 2023 parliamentary election, she appeared in the thirty-second position on the SNS's Serbia Must Not Stop list and was again re-elected when the list won 129 seats. In her fourth term, she was a deputy member of the stabilization and association committee.

She resigned from the national assembly on 10 June 2024, as she could not hold a dual mandate as a legislator and a member of the executive branch of government in Ub.

=== Municipal politics ===
Nikolić received the fifth position on the Progressive Party's electoral list for the Ub municipal assembly in the 2020 Serbian local elections and was elected when the list won twenty-six out of thirty mandates. She was chosen as speaker of the assembly after the election.

The Ub municipal assembly was dissolved for early elections in October 2023, and Nikolić was appointed as a member of a provisional authority that oversaw the municipality pending the creation of a new administration. She again appeared in the fifth position on the SNS's list in the election that followed and was re-elected when the list won twenty-one seats. She was chosen for a second term as speaker when the new assembly convened in early 2024.

Ub mayor Darko Glišić resigned on 10 May 2024 after being appointed as a minister in the Serbian government. His deputy Aleksandar Jovanović Džajić became mayor on 7 June 2024, and Nikolić was appointed as the municipality's new deputy mayor on the same day.
