= Dijana Radović =

Serbian politician

- Дијана Радовић

Member of the National Assembly of the Republic of Serbia
- Incumbent
- Assumed office 3 August 2020

Substitute Member of the Parliamentary Assembly of the Council of Europe
- In office 15 April 2024 – 29 September 2024

Personal details
- Born: 1 September 1989 (age 37)
- Party: SPS

Dijana Radović (Serbian Cyrillic: Дијана Радовић; born 1 September 1989) is a Serbian politician. She has served in the Serbian national assembly since 2020 as a member of the Socialist Party of Serbia (SPS).

== Private career ==
Radović is from Priboj. She has a degree from the University of Belgrade Faculty of Political Sciences and has been active with the Socialist Youth of Serbia.

== Politician ==
=== Early years in municipal politics (2012–16) ===
Radović was given the sixth position on the SPS's electoral list for the Priboj municipal assembly in the 2012 Serbian local elections. The list won five seats; she was not immediately elected but received a mandate on 19 July 2012 as the replacement for another party member. She served for the term that followed and was for a time the SPS's assembly leader.

She was promoted to the third position on the SPS list in the 2016 local elections and was re-elected when the list won four seats. She resigned her mandate on 15 June 2016.

=== Parliamentarian (2020–present) ===
Radović received the fifteenth position on the Socialist Party's list in the 2020 Serbian parliamentary election and was elected when the list won thirty-two seats. After the election, the Socialists continued their participation in a coalition government led by the Serbian Progressive Party (SNS), and Radović supported the administration in the assembly.

In her first assembly term, Radović was a member of the agriculture committee (Note: Formally known as the Agriculture, Forestry, and Water Management Committee.) and a deputy member of the committee on constitutional and legal issues, the defence and internal affairs committee, the foreign affairs committee, the committee on human and minority rights and gender equality, the economy committee, (Note: Formally known as the Committee on Economy, Regional Development, Trade, Tourism, and Energy.) the European integration committee, the administrative committee, (Note: Formally known as the Committee on Administrative, Budgetary, Mandate, and Immunity Issues.) and the European Union–Serbia stabilisation and association committee. She was also the head of Serbia's parliamentary friendship group with Trinidad and Tobago and a member of the friendship groups with Bosnia and Herzegovina, Cambodia, China, Egypt, Ireland, Japan, Russia, Slovakia, Tunisia, the United Kingdom, and the United States of America.

She was promoted to the fourth position on the SPS's list for the 2022 parliamentary election. This was tantamount to election, and she was indeed re-elected when the list won thirty-one seats. In the term that followed, she was a member of the agriculture committee and the stabilization and association committee, and a deputy member of the defence committee, the human rights committee, the European integration committee, and the judiciary committee. (Note: Formally known as the Committee on the Judiciary, Public Administration, and Local Self-Government.) She was again the leader of Serbia's parliamentary friendship group with Trinidad and Tobago and was a member of twenty-one other friendship groups. (Note: She was a member of the friendship groups with Australia, Austria, Bosnia and Herzegovina, Bulgaria, the Caribbean countries (Antigua and Barbuda, Barbados, Belize, Dominica, Haiti, St. Kitts and Nevis, and St. Lucia), China, the Democratic Republic of the Congo, Denmark, Egypt, Eswatini, Greece, Hungary, Ireland, Japan, Liechtenstein, New Zealand and the Pacific Island countries (Vanuatu, Tuvalu, Fiji, Nauru, Palau, Papua New Guinea, and the Solomon Islands), Slovakia, Spain, Suriname, Sweden, and Venezuela.)

Radović appeared in the thirteenth position on the SPS's list in the 2023 parliamentary election and was elected to a third term when the list won eighteen seats. She is now a member of the agriculture committee, a deputy member of the environmental protection committee and the European integration committee, a member of the subcommittee on monitoring the agricultural situation in marginal areas with difficult working conditions, the leader of Serbia's parliamentary friendship group with Eswatini, and a member of the twenty-three other friendship groups. (Note: She is a member of the friendship groups with Algeria, Austria, Azerbaijan, Belarus, the Benelux countries, Bosnia and Herzegovina, Brazil, China, Cuba, Cyprus, Denmark, Greece, Hungary, India, Ireland, Morocco, Nigeria, Portugal, Romania, Russia, Slovakia, Ukraine, and Venezuela.)

She was also re-elected to the Priboj municipal assembly in the 2023 Serbian local elections, which were held concurrently with the parliamentary vote. The governing Serbian Progressive Party ran a combined list with the SPS in Priboj; Radović appeared in the eighth position and was elected when the list won a majority victory with twenty-three out of forty-one seats.

In March 2024, Radović was one of five Serbian parliamentarians who served as international observers for the 2024 Russian presidential election. She was elected as a member of the SPS presidency on 17 July 2024.

=== Parliamentary Assembly of the Council of Europe ===
Radović became a substitute member of Serbia's delegation to the Parliamentary Assembly of the Council of Europe (PACE) on 15 April 2024. She served with the Socialists, Democrats and Greens Group and was an alternate member of the committee on culture, science, education, and media. She stood down from the PACE on 29 September 2024.
