= Visak (Serbia) =

Hill in Serbia

Coordinates: 44°10′24″N 20°55′14″E

Visak is a hill in the municipality of Rača (Serbian Cyrillic: Рача) located in the Šumadija District of Serbia. The top of the hill is 396 meters above sea level and is on State Road 157.
