= Milena Turk =

Serbian politician

Milena Turk (Serbian Cyrillic: Милена Турк; born 1986) is a politician in Serbia. She has served in the National Assembly of Serbia since 2014 as a member of the Serbian Progressive Party.

== Early life and career ==
Turk was born in Trstenik, at the time part of the Socialist Republic of Serbia in the Socialist Federal Republic of Yugoslavia. She graduated from the University of Niš Faculty of Natural Sciences and Mathematics with a Bachelor's degree in Chemistry, taught chemistry at the Živadin Apostolović school in Trstenik, and worked for two years at Prva Petoletka in the municipality.

== Political career ==
Turk received the 120th position on the Progressive Party's Aleksandar Vučić — Future We Believe In electoral list for the 2014 Serbian parliamentary election and was elected when the list won a landslide victory with 158 out of 250 mandates. She was promoted to the eighty-fourth position on the successor Aleksandar Vučić — Serbia is winning list for the 2016 parliamentary election and was re-elected when the list won 131 mandates. She is currently a member of the assembly committee on human and minority rights and gender equality, a member of the environmental protectional committee, the head of Serbia's parliamentary friendship group with Luxembourg, and a member of the parliamentary friendship groups with Austria, Azerbaijan, Belarus, Canada, China, the Czech Republic, Germany, Italy, Japan, Kazakhstan, the Netherlands, Norway, Russia, Slovenia, Tunisia, and the United States of America.

Turk is vice-president of the Progressive Party's municipal board in Trstenik.
