= Marina Lipovac Tanasković =

Serbian politician

- Марина Липовац Танасковић

Member of the National Assembly of the Republic of Serbia
- In office 1 August 2022 – 6 February 2024

Member of the City Assembly of Belgrade
- In office 29 June 2018 – 30 October 2023

Personal details
- Born: 1978 (age 47–48)
- Party: Narodna (until April 2024)

Marina Lipovac Tanasković (Serbian Cyrillic: Марина Липовац Танасковић; born 1978) is a Serbian engineer and politician. She served in the Serbian national assembly from 2022 to 2024 as a member of the People's Party (Narodna).

She left the People's Party in April 2024.

== Early life and career ==
Lipovac Tanasković was born in Belgrade, in what was then the Socialist Republic of Serbia in the Socialist Federal Republic of Yugoslavia. She is a graduate of the University of Belgrade Faculty of Traffic Engineering; in 2002, she was cited as the best student in the faculty's road and city department. She has worked as chief engineer on several large infrastructure projects, including the Belgrade–Novi Sad highway, the Pirot–Dimitrovgrad highway, and the construction of a bypass around Belgrade. She has also worked on numerous traffic projects in Western Australia. During her time in public office, she was employed as a technical director for the Chartered Institute of Logistics and Transport.

== Politician ==
=== Belgrade city delegate (2018–23) ===
The People's Party contested the 2018 Belgrade City Assembly election as part of Dragan Đilas's multi-party coalition. Lipovac Tanasković appeared in the twenty-seventh position on the coalition's electoral list and narrowly missed direct election to the city assembly when the list won twenty-six seats. She received a mandate on 29 June 2018 as the replacement for another delegate. The Serbian Progressive Party (SNS) and its allies won a majority government, and Lipovac Tanasković served in opposition.

The People's Party established its own Belgrade assembly group in December 2020, and Lipovac Tanasković was chosen as its leader. She indicated that her party would work closely with the Party of Freedom and Justice (SSP), another prominent opposition group.

For the 2022 Belgrade election, the People's Party participated in the United for the Victory of Serbia (UZPS) coalition of opposition parties. Lipovac Tanasković received the eighth position on the coalition's list and was re-elected when it won twenty-six seats. The SNS won a plurality victory and was ultimately able to remain in power, while the UZPS parties served in opposition.

The city assembly was dissolved on 30 October 2023 in order to permit an early election, and Lipovac Tanasković's term came to an end at that time.

=== Parliamentarian (2022–2024) ===
Lipovac Tanasković received the twenty-fourth position on the United for the Victory of Serbia electoral list in the 2022 Serbian parliamentary election and was elected when the list won thirty-eight seats. The SNS and its allies won the election, and Lipovac Tanasković served with the People's Party group in opposition. She was a member of the spatial planning committee, (Note: Formally known as the Committee on Spatial Planning, Transport, Infrastructure, and Telecommunications.) a deputy member of the environmental protection committee and the committee on the rights of the child, and a member of the parliamentary friendship groups with Australia, Malta, Peru, South Africa, the countries of Southeast Asia, (Note: Thailand, Singapore, Brunei Darussalam, and Timor-Leste.) and the United Arab Emirates.

In a June 2023 interview, Lipovac Tanasković described the People's Party as a bridge between the "national" and "civil" camps in Serbian politics. She was quoted as saying, "Right-wingers think that we are pro-European, and then if you ask some other MPs, they will say that we are too right-wing [...] We believe that we do not give enough attention to national interests, that Kosovo and Metohija is an inalienable part of Serbia, just as we believe that Serbia should strive for some European principles."

The People's Party experienced a serious split in August 2023, with several members joining the breakaway People's Movement of Serbia (NPS). Lipovac Tanasković remained with the People's Party.

The People's Party fielded its own lists in the 2023 Serbian parliamentary election and the concurrent 2023 Belgrade City Assembly election, and Lipovac Tanasković appeared in the fifth position in both campaigns. The party failed to cross the electoral threshold at either level, and her national assembly term ended when the new parliament convened in February 2024.

=== Since February 2024 ===
Lipovac Tanasković left the People's Party in April 2024, saying that it had shifted too far to the right.
