= Dragan Vesović =

Serbian politician

Dragan Vesović (Serbian Cyrillic: Драган Весовић; born 26 September 1966) is a politician in Serbia. He served in the National Assembly of Serbia from 2016 to 2020 as a member of the right-wing Dveri party.

== Early life and career ==
Vesović was born in Čačak, in what was then the Socialist Republic of Serbia in the Socialist Federal Republic of Yugoslavia. He was raised in Kraljevo, where he still resides. Vesović is a graduate of the University of Belgrade Faculty of Dentistry, taught at the Kraljevo medical school for sixteen years, and has been a dentist in private practice since 2002.

== Politician ==
=== Municipal politics ===
Vesović joined Dveri upon its formation as a political party in 2011. He appeared in the lead position on the party's list for the Kraljevo city assembly in the 2012 Serbian local elections and was elected when the list won seven mandates. He appeared in the same position in the 2016 local elections and was elected to a second term when it won six mandates. Dveri did not participate in the 2020 elections, and his term came to an end that year.

=== Parliamentarian ===
Vesović received the 179th position on Dveri's electoral list in the 2012 Serbian parliamentary election and the eleventh position in the 2014 parliamentary election. The party did not cross the electoral threshold to win representation in the national assembly on either occasion.

Dveri contested the 2016 Serbian parliamentary election in an alliance with the Democratic Party of Serbia. Vesović received the fifteenth position on their combined list and, as the list won thirteen mandates, was not initially elected. He was, however, awarded a mandate on 11 August 2016 as a replacement for Biljana Rubaković, who had resigned. The election was won by the Serbian Progressive Party and its allies, and Dveri served in opposition.

During his term in parliament, Vesović was the deputy leader of Dveri's parliamentary group; a member of the assembly's health and family committee and the committee on spatial planning, transport, infrastructure, and telecommunications; a member of a commission "to Investigate the Consequences of the North Atlantic Treaty Organization (NATO) 1999 Bombing on the Health of the Citizens of Serbia, as well as the Environment, with a Special Focus on the Impact of the Depleted Uranium Projectiles"; and a member of the parliamentary friendship groups with Armenia, Belarus, Bulgaria, China, Georgia, Greece, Israel, Japan, Kazakhstan, Macedonia, Russia, and Syria.

Dveri joined an opposition boycott of the assembly in 2019 and did not participate in the 2020 parliamentary elections. Vesović's parliamentary mandate expired on 3 August 2020. Shortly before this occurred, he accused Radio Television of Serbia of acting like a "bot of the Serbian Progressive Party."
