= Vladan Vasić =

Serbian politician (born 1971)

- Владан Васић
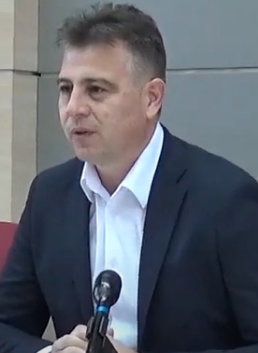
- Born: 1971 (age 54–55)
- Occupation: Mayor of Pirot

Vladan Vasić (Serbian Cyrillic: Владан Васић; born 1971) is a politician in Serbia. He has served as the mayor of Pirot since 2003 and also served a brief term in the National Assembly of Serbia in 2012. Leader for many years of the local Coalition for Pirot, Vasić joined the Serbian Progressive Party in February 2020.

== Early life and private career ==
Vasić was born in 1971 in Pirot, in what was then the Socialist Republic of Serbia in the Socialist Federal Republic of Yugoslavia. He graduated from the University of Niš Faculty of Electronic Engineering in 1996, worked as a systems engineer for six years, and received his master's degree from the University of Niš in 2003.

== Political career ==
Vasić was elected to the Pirot municipal assembly in 2000 as a member of the Democratic Opposition of Serbia, a broad coalition of parties opposed to Slobodan Milošević's administration. He was first elected as mayor in late 2003, defeating Socialist Party of Serbia candidate Dragan Todorović in the second round of a direct election. In 2005, he announced a partnership with the mayor of nearby Pernik, Bulgaria, for cross-border co-operation. The following year, he rejected the far-right Serbian Radical Party's argument that Pirot should reject the donation of a city bus from the Dutch city of The Hague while Serbian military and political figures were detained by the International Criminal Tribunal for the Former Yugoslavia in the same city; Vasić noted that the municipal government and the tribunal were entirely different entities. Vasić and the Coalition for Pirot were re-elected in 2008, running in an alliance with the G17 Plus party.

In 2009–2010, Vasić took part in negotiations with G17 Plus and other regional party leaders that led to the creation of the United Regions of Serbia (URS) alliance. This caused a serious split at the local level; some Coalition for Pirot members who opposed joining the URS sought to overturn Vasić's leadership and expel him from the movement. Vasić responded that the Coalition for Pirot was not a formal political organization and that the expulsion effort was therefore meaningless. At around the same time, Vasić brought the local committee of the Radical Party into his municipal governing alliance following the departure of the Democratic Party. This was a controversial decision; Serbian deputy prime minister Božidar Đelić subsequently refused to visit Pirot during a tour of south Serbia.

Vasić became involved in a controversy with a local newspaper in 2011, after he accused a journalist of interfering with the business of the municipal assembly by making an unauthorized recording on a handheld device. The Independent Journalists' Association of Serbia criticized Vasić in this matter. Meetings of the assembly are open to the public and are broadcast on public media.

In 2012, Vasić signed a memorandum of understanding for the company Michelin to expand its Tigar Tyres plant in the municipality.

Vasić received the fifth position on the URS electoral list in the 2012 Serbian parliamentary election as a G17 Plus candidate and was elected to the National Assembly when the list won sixteen mandates. He was also selected for a third term mayor after his alliance's victory in the 2012 local elections. Legally prevented from holding a dual mandate, he resigned his parliamentary seat on 30 August 2012; in so doing, he remarked that he did not agree with the law and did not believe he was in a conflict of interest situation.

The various groups in the URS merged into a united political party in 2013. Vasić received the eighth position on its list for the 2014 parliamentary election, but the list did not cross the electoral threshold to win representation in the assembly and subsequently dissolved.

Vasić led the Coalition for Pirot to another victory in the 2016 Serbian local elections, narrowly defeating the list of the Serbian Progressive Party. This was the first local election to take place in Pirot after the municipality was upgraded to a city. Vasić was once again confirmed as mayor after the election, forming a new government with the Progressive Party. In February 2020, he announced that the Coalition for Pirot had collectively joined the Progressive Party.

A 2018 profile piece in the newspaper Danas reviewed Vasić's first fifteen years in office.
