= Civic Democratic Party (Serbia) =

Serbian political party

Civic Democratic Party Грађанска демократска партија
- Seal of the GDP
- Abbreviation: GDP
- President: Miroslav Ilić
- Founded: September 2023
- Dissolved: March 2024
- Preceded by: Vojvodina's Party (legal)
- Succeeded by: Movement of Free Citizens (legal)
- Headquarters: Vojvode Putnika 4, Novi Sad
- Ideology: Liberalism
- Political position: Centre
- National affiliation: Serbia Against Violence

The Civic Democratic Party (Serbian: Грађанска демократска партија, romanised: Građanska demokratska partija, abbr. GDP) was a Serbian political party that existed from 2023 to 2024. It joined the Serbia Against Violence (SPN) coalition on 3 November 2023 and took part in Serbia's December 2023 elections at the republican, provincial, and local levels. Its leader was Miroslav Ilić.

The GDP was closely associated with the Movement of Free Citizens (PSG). All of the GDP-endorsed candidates who were elected in the 2023 Serbian parliamentary election and the 2023 Belgrade City Assembly election were members of the PSG, and both of the GDP-endorsed candidates elected in the 2023 Vojvodina provincial election later joined the PSG. (The PSG was not a registered political party at the time of the 2023 elections and could not formally endorse its own candidates under Serbia's election law.)

The GDP merged outright into the Movement of Free Citizens after the 2023 elections, giving its party registration to the PSG.

== History ==
The Civic Democratic Party came into existence in late 2023, when Vojvodina's Party (VP) permitted the new party to take over its official registration. In October 2023, the GDP entered into an alliance with the Movement of Free Citizens and various citizens' groups in Vojvodina.

When the GDP joined the Serbia Against Violence coalition the following month, Novi Sad's Radio 021 observed that the party was not generally known to the public.

=== 2023 Serbian parliamentary election ===
The SPN included nine candidates endorsed by the GDP on its electoral list in the 2023 Serbian parliamentary election. The list won sixty-five seats, and three GDP-endorsed candidates were elected: Anna Oreg, Pavle Grbović, and Vladimir Pajić. All were members of the Movement of Free Citizens.

=== 2023 Vojvodina provincial election ===
The SPN coalition won thirty seats in the 2023 Vojvodina provincial election. Two GDP-endorsed candidates were elected: party leader Miroslav Ilić and Svetlana Kozić, the leader of the local Kikinda political initiative "Banat je u pravu" (Banat Is Right).

After the GDP merged into the Movement of Free Citizens, Ilić became the leader of the PSG's Vojvodina provincial board, and Kozić became the leader of its municipal board in Kikinda.

=== 2023 local elections ===
The SPN coalition won forty-three seats in the 2023 Belgrade City Assembly election. Three GDP-endorsed candidates were elected, all of whom were members of the PSG: Stefan Simić, Jelena Banjac, and Ivana Mandić. Candidates endorsed by the GDP were also elected in other cities.

== After the 2023 elections ==
In early 2024, the Civic Democratic Party permitted the Movement of Free Citizens to take over its party registration and ceased to exist as a separate organisation.
