= Vladica Dimitrov =

Serbian politician

- Владица Димитров
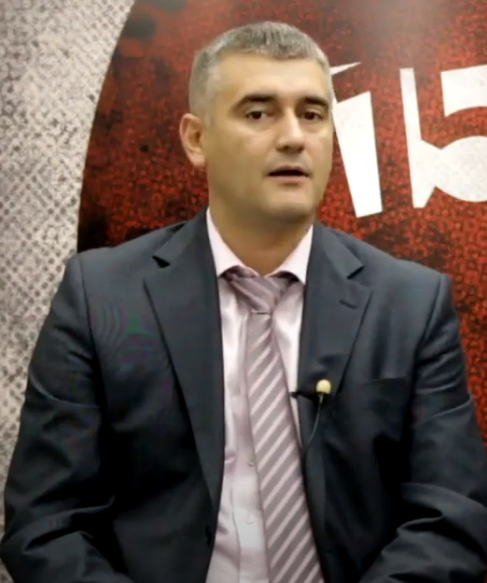

Mayor of Dimitrovgrad
- Incumbent
- Assumed office 2016
- In office 2011–2014

Member of the National Assembly
- In office 2014–2016

Personal details
- Born: 1974 (age 51–52) Dimitrovgrad, SR Serbia, SFR Yugoslavia
- Party: DSS (2001–2008); DS (2008–2013); SNS (2013–present)

Vladica Dimitrov (Serbian Cyrillic: Владица Димитров; born 1974) is a politician in Serbia from the country's Bulgarian community. He was a member of the National Assembly of Serbia from 2014 to 2016 and is currently serving his fourth term as mayor of Dimitrovgrad. Dimitrov has been a member of the Serbian Progressive Party since 2013.

== Early life and career ==
Dimitrov was born in Dimitrovgrad, in what was then the Socialist Republic of Serbia in the Socialist Federal Republic of Yugoslavia. He is a graduate of the University of Niš Faculty of Medicine and works as a radiology specialist in private life.

== Politician ==
Dimitrov entered political life as a member of the Democratic Party of Serbia (Demokratska stranka Srbije, DSS) and was elected to Dimitrovgrad municipal assembly under its banner in the 2004 Serbian local elections. He served as president (i.e., speaker) of the assembly from 2004 to 2007. In the buildup to the 2008 local elections, he left the DSS to join the rival Democratic Party (Demokratska stranka, DS). The DS emerged from these elections as the dominant party in a local coalition government, and Dimitrov was appointed to the municipal council (i.e., the executive branch of the municipal government) with responsibility for health and social policy. He was first chosen as mayor in December 2011, after the resignation of Veselin Velichkov.

After the 2012 local elections, the Democratic Party formed an administration with the Socialist Party of Serbia and other parties, and Dimitrov was selected for a second term as mayor. He was acting leader of the local DS board during this period. In 2013, a split in the party and a realignment of local political forces led to Dimitrov being replaced as mayor by Nebojša Ivanov. Dimitrov left the DS at this time and joined the Serbian Progressive Party.

Dimitrov received the 143rd position on the Progressive Party's Aleksandar Vučić — Future We Believe In electoral list for the national assembly in the 2014 Serbian parliamentary election and was elected when the list won a landslide victory with 158 mandates. For the next two years, he served in parliament as a supporter of the Vučić's ministry. He received the 140th position successor Aleksandar Vučić – Serbia Is Winning list in the 2016 parliamentary election and missed election when the list won 131 mandates. He was however re-elected to the Dimitrovgrad municipal assembly in the concurrent 2016 local elections and was again selected as mayor after the Progressives won a local victory. He had the opportunity to return to the national assembly in 2017 as the replacement for another member, but he chose not to.

Dimitrov led the Progressives to another victory in the 2020 Serbian local elections and was chosen for a fourth term as mayor at the first meeting of the new municipal assembly.

As mayor, he has taken part in a number of delegations to neighbouring Bulgaria.

=== Member of the Bulgarian National Council ===
Dimitrov appeared at the head of his own "Future We Believe In" list for Serbia's Bulgarian National Council in 2014 and was elected when the list won four mandates out of nineteen mandates. He appeared in the second place on a list led by Bosilegrad mayor Vladimir Zahariev in 2018 and was re-elected when the list won a majority victory with seventeen mandates.
