= Vidoje Petrović =

Serbian politician

Vidoje Petrović (Serbian Cyrillic: Видоје Петровић; born 28 June 1961) is a politician in Serbia. He is a longtime mayor of Loznica and has served three terms in the National Assembly of Serbia as a member of G17 Plus and the United Regions of Serbia. Petrović is now a member of the Serbian Progressive Party.

== Early life and career ==
Petrović was born in Lešnica, a village in the municipality of Loznica, in what was then the People's Republic of Serbia in the Federal People's Republic of Yugoslavia. He graduated from the Belgrade Military Academy, worked in the ministry of the interior for sixteen years, and oversaw the first cohort of graduates from the Belgrade Police Academy.

== Politician ==
=== Municipal politics ===
Petrović was first elected as mayor of Loznica via a direct vote as a G17 Plus candidate in the 2004 municipal elections. Serbia subsequently ended the direct election of mayors, and Petrović was given a second term in office by a vote of the city assembly following the 2008 local elections.

In November 2006, Petrović and United States ambassador of Serbia Michael C. Polt inaugurated a Local Economic Development office in Loznica, funded by the United States Agency for International Development (USAID). In June 2010, Petrović joined with Serbian economy minister Mlađan Dinkić to announce that the Italian clothing company Golden Lady would construct a factory in the city. He also served in the Chamber of the Local Authorities in the Congress of Local and Regional Authorities of the Council of Europe from 2004 to 2011, initially as a delegate for Serbia and Montenegro and subsequently for Serbia after Montenegro's declaration of independence in 2006.

In 2012, G17 Plus created a new political alliance called the United Regions of Serbia (URS). Petrović led the alliance to a plurality victory with twenty-one out of fifty-nine mandates in the 2012 local elections and was thereafter chosen for another term as mayor.

The URS dissolved after a poor showing in the 2014 Serbian parliamentary election. Petrović joined the Progressive Party in 2015 and led the party to a majority victory with thirty-four mandates in the 2016 local elections. In 2018, he and Serbian president Aleksandar Vučić announced that the Chinese car parts company Minth would invest in a factory in the city. Petrović subsequently promoted investment in the electric vehicle sector in Loznica in 2019, noting the presence of Rio Tinto's Jadar mine in the municipality as an incentive.

He led the Progressives to an increased majority with forty-three out of fifty-nine mandates in the 2020 local elections.

=== Member of the National Assembly ===
Petrović appeared on the electoral list of G17 Plus in the 2003 Serbian parliamentary election, receiving the 172nd position out of 250. The list won thirty-four mandates, and he was not selected for a mandate. (From 2000 to 2011, mandates in Serbian elections held under proportional representation were awarded to successful parties or coalitions rather than individual candidates, and it was common practice for the mandates to be assigned out of numerical order. Petrović could have been assigned a mandate notwithstanding his position on the list – which was in any event mostly alphabetical – but he was not.) G17 Plus participated in Serbia's coalition government after the election, and Petrović served in the ministry of finance from March to October 2004.

He again appeared on the G17 Plus list for the 2007 parliamentary election. The list won nineteen mandates, and on this occasion he was selected for the party's assembly delegation. G17 Plus joined an unstable coalition government led by the Democratic Party (Demokratska stranka, DS) and the rival Democratic Party of Serbia (Demokratska stranka Srbije, DSS) after the election, and Petrović served as a supporter of the administration.

The DS–DSS coalition collapsed in early 2008, leading to a a new election that year. G17 Plus participated in the Democratic Party's For a European Serbia coalition, which emerged as the largest group in the assembly with 102 out of 250 seats. Petrović was a G17 Plus candidate on the list and was chosen for a second mandate after the election. After extended negotiations, For a European Serbia formed a new coalition government with the Socialist Party of Serbia and other parties, and Petrović again served as a supporter of the ministry. His term in the assembly was brief; he resigned on 29 October 2008.

Serbia's election laws were reformed in 2011, such that mandates were awarded in numerical order to candidates on successful lists. Petrović received the ninth position on the United Regions of Serbia list in the 2012 parliamentary election and was re-elected when the alliance won sixteen seats. The URS initially participated in a coalition government led by the Serbian Progressive Party and the Socialist Party of Serbia. Petrović's term in office was again brief; following the 2011 reforms, he could not hold a dual mandate as mayor and member of the assembly, and so he resigned his mandate on 29 August 2012. In April 2013, G17 Plus formally merged into the URS. Petrović was promoted to the fourth position on the URS's list for the 2014 election, but the list did not cross the electoral threshold to win representation in the assembly.

As of 2021, he has not sought election to the national assembly as a Progressive Party member.
