= Rača, Serbia =

Rača Рача (Serbian)
- Town and municipality
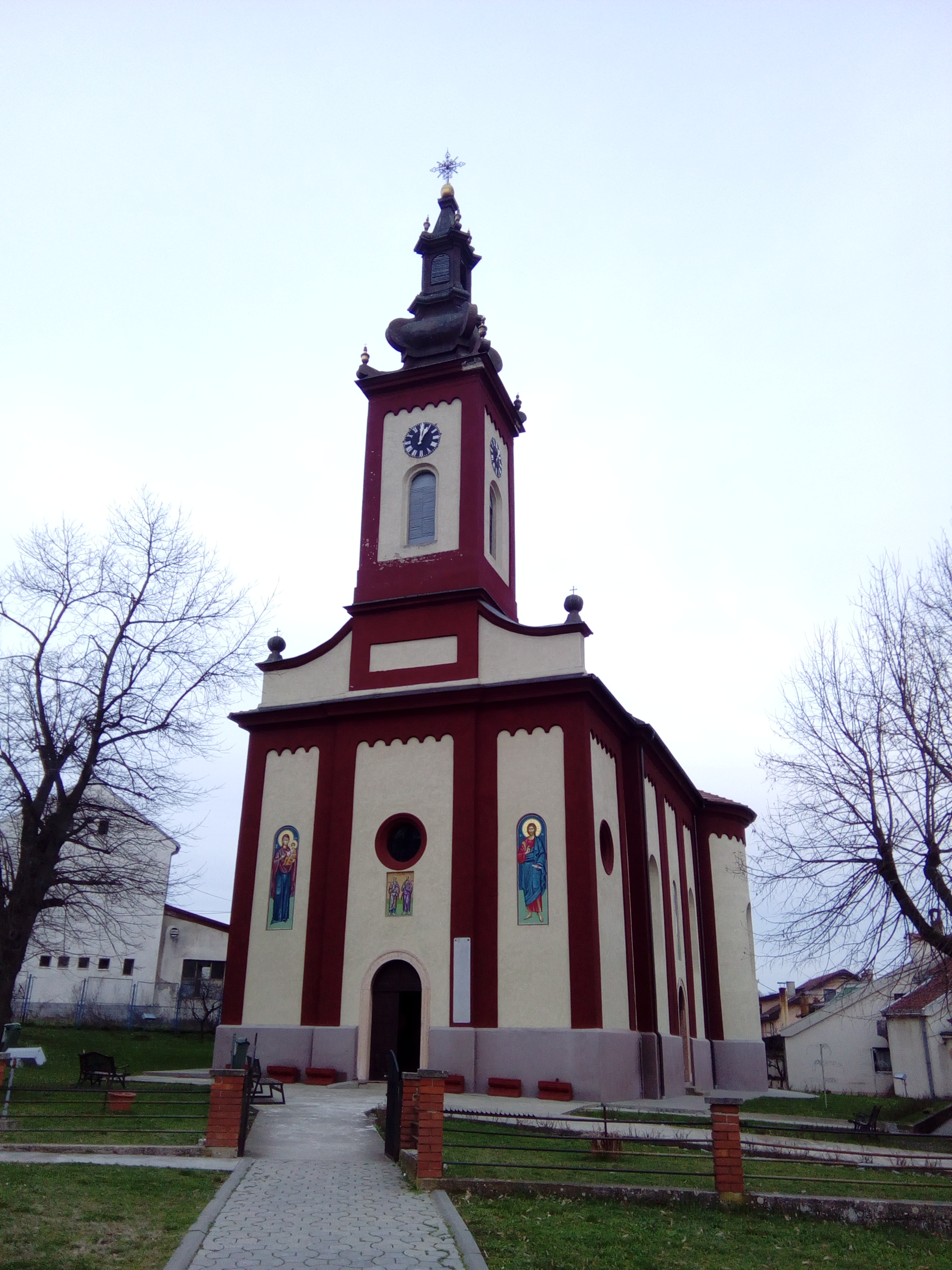

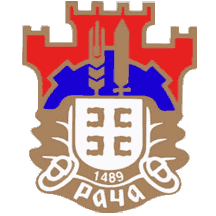
- Coat of arms

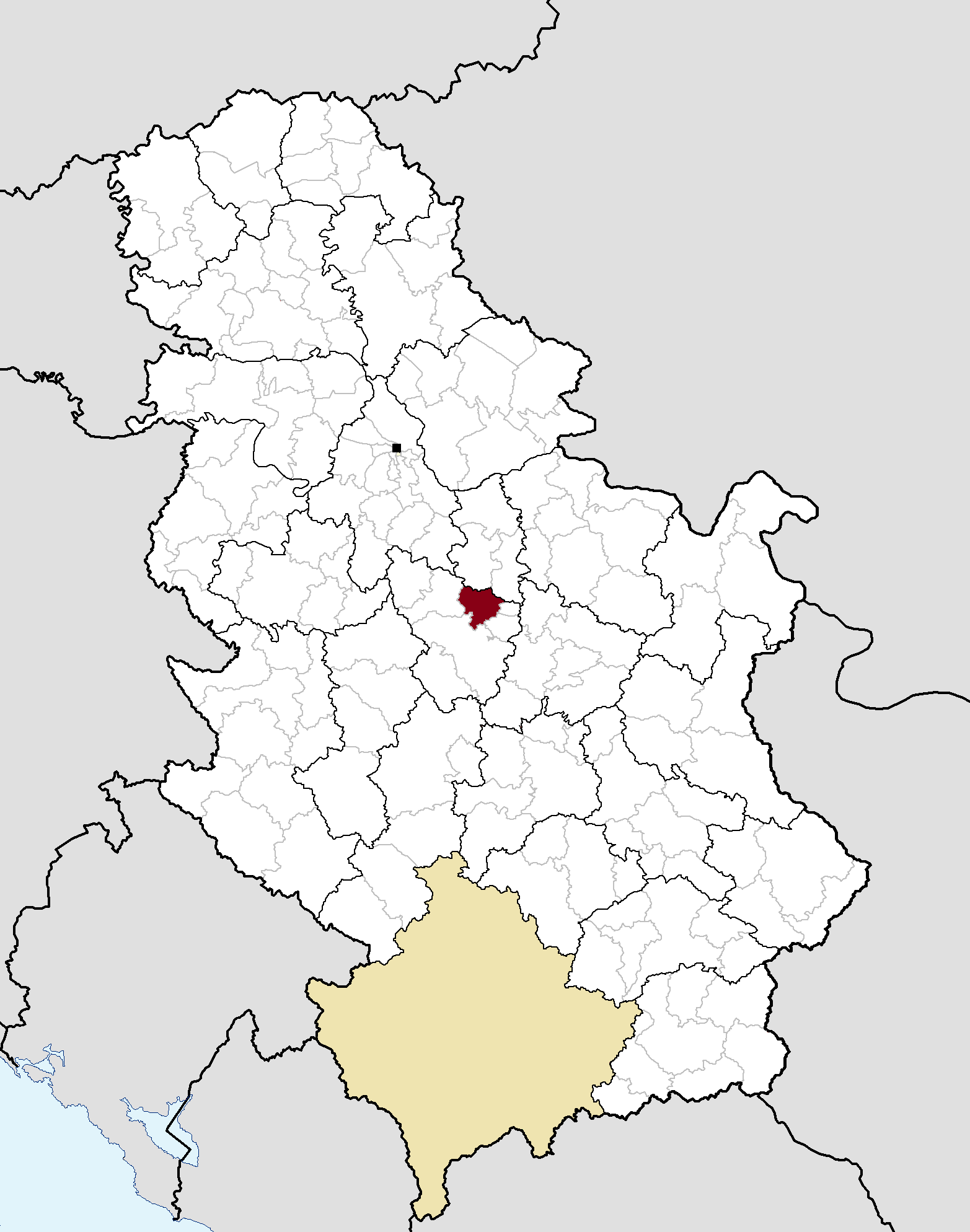
- Location of the municipality of Rača within Serbia
- Coordinates: 44°14′N 20°59′E
- Country: Serbia
- Region: Šumadija and Western Serbia
- District: Šumadija
- Settlements: 18

Government
  - Mayor: Branko Radosavljević (SNS)

Area
  - Municipality: 216 km^{2} (83 sq mi)
- Elevation: 140 m (460 ft)

Population (2022 census)
  - Town: 2,362
  - Municipality: 9,638
- Time zone: UTC+1 (CET)
  - Summer (DST): UTC+2 (CEST)
- Postal code: 34210
- Area code: +381(0)34
- Car plates: KG
- Website: www.raca.rs

Rača (Serbian Cyrillic: Рача) is a town and municipality located in the Šumadija District of central Serbia. According to 2022 census, the population of the town is 2,362, while population of the municipality is 9,638.

== Demographics ==
Historical population
Year	Pop.	±% p.a.
1948	18,361	—
1953	18,969	+0.65%
1961	18,010	−0.65%
1971	16,542	−0.85%
1981	16,262	−0.17%
1991	15,216	−0.66%
2002	12,959	−1.45%
2011	11,503	−1.32%
2022	9,638	−1.60%

== Economy ==
The following table gives a preview of total number of employed people per their core activity (as of 2017):

Activity	Total
Agriculture, forestry and fishing	29
Mining	-
Processing industry	1,455
Distribution of power, gas and water	1
Distribution of water and water waste management	1
Construction	68
Wholesale and retail, repair	278
Traffic, storage and communication	35
Hotels and restaurants	1
Media and telecommunications	7
Finance and insurance	15
Property stock and charter	3
Professional, scientific, innovative and technical activities	56
Administrative and other services	17
Administration and social assurance	136
Education	172
Healthcare and social work	94
Art, leisure and recreation	5
Other services	20
Total	2,458

== See also ==
- Visak
