= Opinion polling for the 2023 Serbian parliamentary election =

In the run-up to the 2023 Serbian parliamentary election, various organisations carried out opinion polling to gauge voting intentions in Serbia. The results of such polls are displayed in this list. The date range for these opinion polls is from the previous election, held on 3 April 2022, to the 2023 election, which was held on 17 December 2023.

== Graphical summary ==
Local regression chart of poll results from 3 April 2022 to 17 December 2023

== Poll results ==
=== 2023 ===
Polling firm	Date of publication	Sample size	SNS–led coalition	SPS–JS	SPN								NADA		NO		Narodna	Others	Lead
Polling firm	Date of publication	Sample size	SNS–led coalition	SPS–JS	SSP	PSG	DS	Together	SRCE	NDB/ZLF	EU (Note: Was part of Together until September 2023.)	NPS (Note: Split from the People's Party (Narodna) in August 2023.)	NDSS	POKS	Dveri	SSZ	Narodna	Others	Lead
2023 election	17 December	–	48.0	6.7	24.3								5.2		2.8		0.9	11.9 (Note: MI-GIN: 4.8%, VMSZ: 1.7%, SRS: 1.5%, DJS: 1.2%, SPP–DSHV: 0.8%, SDAS: 0.6%, PBASN: 0.4%, RS–NKPJ: 0.3%, LDP: 0.2%, KZMT: 0.2%, Nova–D2SP–GDF–Libdem–Glas: 0.1%, APN: 0.1%)	23.8
Ipsos (Note: Poll commissioned on the orders of SNS.)	14 December	3,712	44.6	8.7	23.6								4.9		3.2		1.2	10.8 (Note: Mi–GiN: 4.4%, DJS: 2.1%, VMSZ: 1.4%, SRS: 1.0%, SPP–DSHV: 0.7%, SDAS: 0.3%, MD: 0.3%, PBASN: 0.2%, RS: 0.2%, SNZ: 0.1%, ADA: 0.1%, KZMT: 0.0%)	21.0
OFID	14 December	1,200	38.7	8.9	27.1								5.3		6.1		1.3	12.6 (Note: Mi–GIN: 2.8%, DJS: 2.4%, SRS: 1.7%, VMSZ/SVM: 1.6%, Others: 4.1%)	11.6
NSPM	12 December	1,000	39.8	8.9	25.6								5.9		6.5		2.8	10.5 (Note: Mi–GIN: 2.3%, DJS: 2.2%, SRS: 1.5%, VMSZ/SVM: 1.5%, SPP–DSHV: 1.2%, Others: 1.8%)	14.2
NSPM	15 November	1,000	39.2	8.1	25.8								4.4		5.1		3.2	14.2 (Note: DJS: 2.5%, Others: 3.3%, while 8.4% of respondents had stated that they would vote for the opposition)	13.4
NSPM	22 October	1,000	38.5	9.6	6.2		3.1	–	3.8	2.7	3.6	3.1	4.2		5.6		3.3 (Note: Including Enough is Enough (DJB))	16.3 (Note: ZS: 1.4%, Others: 5.8%, while 9.1% of respondents had stated that they would vote for the opposition)	28.9
Faktor Plus	13 October	1,200	44.5	10.8	8.1	1.1	1.5	1.2	2.0	2.4	2.3	5.9	4.0		11.0		1.7	3.5 (Note: SRS: 1.5%; SDS: 1.0%; PEP: 1.0%)	34.5
Stata	13 October	1,546	36.6	7.0	8.6	–	–	–	4.3	3.8	3.5	7.7	3.1	–	3.9	3.4	–	18.1 (Note: Minority parties: 4.3%, Others: 11.0%, Undecided: 2.8%)	28.0
NSPM	28 September	1,000	37.3	9.5	4.2	–	2.4	1.3	3.2	2.3	2.6	2.8	3.6	–	3.1	3.0	2.8	21.9 (Note: SDS: 1.4%, SRS: 1.2%, Others: 4%, while 15.3% of respondents had stated that they would vote for the opposition)	27.7
Stata	19 September	1,580	36.3	7.3	9.8	1.9	1.2	0.6	4.4	4.0	3.1	5.5	3.0	–	2.6	3.4	0.5	18.8 (Note: PEP: 2.5%, SDS: 1.5%, SRS: 1.2%, Minority parties: 4.2%, Others: 0.7%, Undecided: 6.4%)	26.5
Stata	28 July	1,558	37.8	8.0	9.6	–	–	6.0	4.7	3.7	–	–	3.6	–	2.6	3.1	2.1	18.8 (Note: PEP: 1.9%, Others: 16.9%)	28.2
NSPM	23 July	1,100	37.2	9.4	4.0	–	2.1	1.3	3.5	2.3	3.4	–	4.2	–	3.9	3.6	3.4	21.7 (Note: SDS: 1.6%, SRS: 1.5%, Others: 3.6%, while 15.0% of respondents had stated that they would vote for the opposition)	27.8
NSPM	2 June	1,000	36.2	8.4	3.8	–	2.6	1.6	3.0	1.8	4.3	–	4.6	1.3	4.0	3.6	3.5	21.3 (Note: SDS: 2.0%, SRS: 1.2%, Others: 3.1%, while 15.0% of respondents had stated that they would vote for the opposition)	27.8
NSPM	27 April	1,000	38.0	9.4	4.2	–	2.8	1.4	3.9	–	3.8	–	4.4	1.0	4.0	3.4	3.2	20.5 (Note: SRS: 1.4%, SDS: 1.5%, Others: 4.4%, while 13.2% of respondents had stated that they would vote for the opposition)	28.6
Faktor Plus	11 April	?	45.5	10.7	6.9	1.2	1.8	2.4	2.0	3.0	–	–	4.5		4.0	4.5	2.5	11.0 (Note: SRS: 2.0%, SDS: 1.8%, Minority parties: 4.0%, Others: 3.2%)	34.8
ŠSM	5 April	1,329	42.8	8.5	4.5	2.2	1.9	3.9	2.9	3.2	–	–	5.2	1.7	4.5	3.1	2.6	13.0 (Note: DJB: 2.9%, SRS: 1.5%, VMSZ/SVM: 1.5%, SDS: 1.1%, LSV: 0.8%, SPP: 0.8%, SDAS: 0.6%, GDF: 0.3%, ZS: 0.2%, Minority parties: 1.0%, Blank vote: 2.5%)	31.9
ŠSM	22 February	?	44.5	8.9	4.5	2.1	2.2	3.9	4.3	2.3	–	–	3.1	2.4	3.8	4.0	2.2	11.8 (Note: DJB: 1.9%, VMSZ/SVM: 1.4%, SRS: 1.3%, SDS: 1.2%, SPP: 0.8%, LSV: 0.8%, SDAS: 0.5%, GDF: 0.4%, ZS: 0.3%, LDP: 0.03%, Minority parties: 0.9%, Blank votes: 2.3%)	35.6
NSPM	14 February	1,050	39.1	10.0	4.7	–	2.2	–	5.2	1.6	3.7	–	5.4	–	3.8	3.6	3.1	17.6 (Note: SRS: 2.1%, SDS: 1.5%, Others: 5.0%, while 9.0% of respondents had stated that they would vote for the opposition)	29.1
Faktor Plus	13 February	1,100	46.0	10.8	7.1	1.1	2.0	2.2	2.2	3.3	–	–	4.7		3.3	4.3	2.7	10.3 (Note: SDS: 2.1%, SRS: 2.0%, Minority parties: 3.2%, Others: 3.0%)	35.2

=== 2022 ===
Polling firm	Date of publication	Sample size	SNS–led coalition	SSP	Narodna	DS	PSG	SPS–JS	NADA		NDB	Together	Dveri	SSZ	SRCE	Others	Lead
Polling firm	Date of publication	Sample size	SNS–led coalition	SSP	Narodna	DS	PSG	SPS–JS	NDSS	POKS	NDB	Together	Dveri	SSZ	SRCE	Others	Lead
Faktor Plus	12 December	?	46.8	7.0	2.8	1.8	1.0	10.9	4.5		3.7	1.6	3.0	3.9	2.0	11.0 (Note: SDS: 1.8%, DJB: 1.0%, SRS: 1.0%)	32.7
NSPM	1 November	1,050	42.5	4.6	2.5	1.5	–	9.8	5.5	–	1.2	3.4	3.9	3.9	4.5	15.8 (Note: SRS: 2.2%, SDS: 1.5%, while 7.9% of respondents had stated that they would vote for the opposition)	32.7
Faktor Plus	25 October	?	46.3	6.8	2.8	2.2	1.2	10.8	5.7		4.3	2.5	3.4	4.0	–	8.9 (Note: SDS: 1.5%, SRS: 1.5%, DJB: 1.3%, Others: 4.6%)	32.0
NSPM	27 July	1,000	42.6	5.3	1.5	1.7	1.4	9.4	6.1	–	–	4.8	3.1	3.8	5.9	14.3 (Note: SDS: 2.0%, while 7.9% of respondents had stated that they would vote for the opposition)	33.2
Demostat	29 June	1,203	48.0	10.0	–	3.0	–	9.0	6.0	–	4.0		4.0	3.0	–	13.0	38.0
2022 election	3 April	–	44.2	14.0				11.7	5.5 (Note: DSS took part with Vojislav Mihailović-led faction of POKS in the 2022 parliamentary election. Mihailović was legally recognised as the president of POKS in July 2022.)		4.8		3.9 (Note: Dveri took part with Žika Gojković-led faction of POKS in the 2022 parliamentary election.)	3.8	–	11.7	30.2

== Scenario polls ==
=== Three alliances ===
In July 2023, Stata conducted a scenario opinion poll. It showed that a potential coalition of SNS, SPS, JS, Social Democratic Party of Serbia, Party of United Pensioners of Serbia, and Movement of Socialists would win 44 percent of the popular vote, while a hypothetical alliance of those who organised the Serbia Against Violence protests, which includes SSP, Narodna, DS, PSG, ZLF, and Together, would win 41 percent of the popular vote. Stata conducted another scenario polls in September and October 2023, this time with Narodna being in the "state-building opposition" bloc. CRTA, however, only polled Dveri, SSZ, NDSS, and POKS as part of the "patriotic bloc".

Polling firm	Date of publication	Sample size	SNS–led coalition	SPN	State-building opposition (Note: Including National Democratic Alternative, Dveri, and Serbian Party Oathkeepers in polls from July 2023 onwards. Including the People's Party in Stata polls only from September 2023 onwards.)	Others	Lead
CRTA	16 October	1,544	49.0	41.0	10.0	0.0	8.0
Stata	13 October	1,546	43.0	39.0	12.0	6.0	4.0
Stata	19 September	1,580	44.0	38.0	11.0	7.0	6.0
Stata	28 July	1,558	44.0	41.0	10.0	5.0	3.0

=== Six alliances ===
Nova srpska politička misao (NSPM) conducted an opinion poll in October 2023 in which they polled 6 alliances of parties.

Polling firm	Date of publication	Sample size	PZS (Note: Including the Serbian Progressive Party (SNS), Socialist Party of Serbia (SPS), United Serbia (JS), and Serbian Radical Party (SRS))	Patriotic Bloc (Note: Including the Serbian Party Oathkeepers (SSZ), Dveri, People's Party (Narodna), and Enough is Enough (DJB))	DS–Together–SRCE	PE–ZLF	NPS–EU–NLS	NADA	Others	Lead
NSPM	22 October	1,000	48.4	10.1	9.4	8.5	7.8	4.2	11.6 (Note: Others: 4.1%, while 7.5% of respondents had stated that they would vote for the opposition)	38.3
