= 2021 Serbian local elections =

- 28 March and 17 October 2021
- Results of the local elections

Local elections in Serbia were held on 28 March 2021 in the municipalities of Zaječar, Kosjerić and Preševo, and on 17 October in Mionica and Negotin.

The ruling Serbian Progressive Party (SNS) won a majority of seats in the city assemblies of Zaječar and Kosjerić, while the Alternative for Changes, led by Shqiprim Arifi, won a majority of seats in Preševo. Non-governmental organisations have reported electoral irregularities in Zaječar and Kosjerić, including physical attacks to some journalists and election list candidates; no irregularities were reported in Preševo.

Later that year, SNS also won a majority of seats in the city assemblies of Mionica and Negotin. Physical attacks towards opposition activists in Negotin sparked media attention, while the People's Party claimed that electoral irregularities took place at voting stations.

== Background ==
Previous local elections in Zaječar and Kosjerić were held in 2017. An opposition civic group named "Movement for Krajina", led by Boško Ničić, won the election in Zaječar with 31.9 percent of the popular vote, while the Serbian Progressive Party-led (SNS) list placed second with 30.82 percent of popular vote. In September 2017, Ničić unexpectedly merged his civic group into SNS, directly giving SNS a majority of seats in the city assembly. SNS won 32.3 percent of the popular vote in Kosjerić, double more than the list led by the Democratic Party (DS), and it retained the majority by aligning with the pro-government parties, Movement of Socialists and the Serbian People's Party.

Preševo, a municipality in which Albanians make a majority of the population, experienced political crisis between 2017 and 2021. The crisis began in September 2017, when the local city council was replaced by a temporary body led by the president of the Municipality of Preševo, Shqiprim Arifi. It was dissolved because no sessions were held since 24 May 2017 according to the law on local self-governments. The local government was dissolved on 18 September 2017. Multiple elections were held in December 2017, January 2018, and June 2020. Albanian minority parties won a majority of seats in those elections. In December 2020, the local city council was dissolved again and a temporary body was introduced because there were no sessions held since 27 August. Arifi, who was re-elected in 2018, was chosen as the head of the temporary body since he served as the president of the municipality.

== Electoral system ==
Local elections in Serbia are held under a proportional representation system. Eligible voters vote for electoral lists, on which the registered candidates are present. An electoral list could be submitted by a registered political party, a coalition of political parties, or a citizens' group. The number of valid signatures needed to be collected to take part in the election varies by the number of eligible voters in that municipality. At least 40 percent of candidates on electoral lists must be female. The electoral list is submitted by its chosen ballot representative, who does not have to be present on its electoral list. An electoral list could be declined, after which those who had submitted can fix the deficiencies in a span of 48 hours, or rejected, if the person is not authorised to nominate candidates. The name and date of the election, the names of the electoral lists and its ballot representatives, and information on how to vote are only present on the voting ballot.

Local electoral commissions and polling boards oversee the election. Seats are allocated with an electoral threshold of 3 percent of all votes cast, however if no electoral list wins 3 percent of all votes cast, then all electoral lists that received votes can participate in the distribution of seats. The seats are distributed by electoral lists in proportion to the number of votes received, while the number of seats belonging to electoral lists is determined by applying the highest quotient system. The seats are distributed by dividing the total number of votes received by the electoral list participating in the distribution of seats by each number from one to the number of councilors the local assembly has. The obtained quotients are classified by size so that the electoral list has as many mandates as it has its quotients among the highest quotients of all the electoral lists participating in the distribution. If two or more electoral lists receive the same quotients on the basis of which the seat is distributed, the electoral list that received the greater number of votes has priority. The seats in the local assemblies are awarded to the candidates to their order on the electoral list, starting with the first candidate from an electoral list. When the councilors of a local assembly are sworn in, they in turn elect the mayor.

An electoral list could be declared the status of an ethnic minority electoral list by the local electoral commission. An ethnic minority electoral list could be only submitted by a registered political party or a coalition of political parties of an ethnic minority. If the percentage of the members of that ethnic minority is less than 50% in that municipality, an electoral list could be then granted the status of an ethnic minority electoral list. If the electoral list receives less than the 3 percent electoral threshold of all votes cast, it would still take part in the distribution of seats. When the distribution of seats takes place, the quotients of ethnic minority electoral lists that won less than 3 percent of the votes are increased by 35 percent.

Any local election, whether it is a municipal or a local assembly election, is called by the president of the National Assembly, who also has to announce its date. To vote, a person has to be a citizen and resident of Serbia and at least 18 years old. A voter could only vote in the municipality of their residence. An election silence begins two days before the scheduled election, meaning that no opinion polls, presentation of candidates and their programmes, or invitation to vote in the election could take place.

== Results and campaigns ==
Ivica Dačić, the president of the National Assembly, called the elections in Zaječar, Kosjerić, and Preševo on 5 February 2021. Later that year, he also called early elections to be held in Mionica and Negotin.

=== Zaječar ===
On 9 March, the Party of United Pensioners of Serbia (PUPS) submitted their electoral list for the election, but were denied participation by the City Election Commission due to deficiencies in the electoral list. The Commission declared their list to be invalid three days later. Together with the United Peasant Party (USS) they announced their support for SNS.

On 27 February, Ničić met with construction, transport and infrastructure minister Tomislav Momirović to discuss about expanding local infrastructure in Zaječar. During the last election week, prime minister Ana Brnabić and president Aleksandar Vučić both visited Zaječar. Ministers Darija Kisić Tepavčević and Branislav Nedimović also visited the town during the campaign period.

In the municipality of Zaječar, there were 50,463 eligible citizens that were able to vote in the 2021 local election. The local City Election Commission reported that the turnout was 49.81%. SNS won 24 seats and it secured the majority together with the Socialist Party of Serbia–United Serbia (SPS–JS) coalition, which won 4 seats. The Nenad Ristović List placed second with 16 seats, while the Dragana Rašić List won 4 seats. The Dejan Krstić List and a list headed by the Enough is Enough (DJB) won one seat each.

Party	Votes	%	Seats
Serbian Progressive Party	10,838	43.19	24
Nenad Ristović List	7,047	28.08	16
SPS–JS	2,157	8.60	4
Dragana Rašić List	1,833	7.30	4
Dejan Krstić List	793	3.16	1
Enough is Enough	778	3.10	1
National Democratic Alternative	674	2.69	0
Dragan Stamenković List	514	2.05	0
Healthy Serbia	461	1.84	0
Total	25,095	100.00	50
Valid votes	25,095	98.23	
Invalid/blank votes	452	1.77	
Total votes	25,547	100.00	
Registered voters/turnout	50,463	50.63	
Source: City of Zaječar

=== Kosjerić ===
The election in Kosjerić was held due to the expiry of the term of the previous assembly elected in 2017.

Election campaigning was prominent in Kosjerić, although opposition parties that boycotted the 2020 parliamentary election decided to not take part in the local elections, stating that "the elections won't be free and fair". Several high officials were spotted during the election campaigns, such as Ivica Dačić and the finance minister Siniša Mali. On 9 March, a basketball club was offered a donation by SNS, but they declined it and described it as a "cheap election propaganda".

In the Municipality of Kosjerić, there were 9,332 eligible citizens that were able to vote in the election. The local Election Commission reported that the turnout was 73%. On the election day, a woman collapsed and died after leaving a polling station. The list headed by SNS won a majority of 20 seats, while the Clean People for Clean Kosjerić list won 3 seats, the National Democratic Alternative coalition, headed by the Movement for the Restoration of the Kingdom of Serbia (POKS) and Democratic Party of Serbia (DSS), won 2 seats including Healthy Serbia (ZS), who also won 2 seats.

Party	Votes	%	Seats
Aleksandar Vučić–For the Future of Kosjerić (Serbian Progressive Party, Socialist Party of Serbia, Party of United Pensioners of Serbia, Movement of Socialists, Serbian People's Party, Social Democratic Party of Serbia)	4,575	68.78	20
Clean People for Clean Kosjerić	904	13.59	3
At Home to Win–Milan Stamatović (Healthy Serbia)	642	9.65	2
Hope for Kosjerić–National Democratic Alternative–Miloš Jovanović–Democratic Party of Serbia–Žika Gojković–Movement for the Restoration of the Kingdom of Serbia	485	7.29	2
Dr. Vojislav Šešelj–Serbian Radical Party	46	0.69	–
Total	6,652	100.00	27
Valid votes	6,652	97.65	
Invalid/blank votes	160	2.35	
Total votes	6,812	100.00	
Registered voters/turnout	9,332	73.00	
Source: City of Kosjerić

Incumbent mayor Žarko Đokić of the Serbian Progressive Party was chosen for a new term in office after the election.

=== Preševo ===
Political events in Preševo, including the crisis, influenced the election to take place, in which a new local city council was elected. Seven Serb parties, led by SNS, declared a common electoral list in early March 2021.

In the Municipality of Preševo, there were 41,847 eligible citizens to vote in the local election. The local Election Commission reported that the turnout was 43%. The Alternative for Changes list, headed by Arifi, won 14 seats and followed by them, the Democratic Party of Albanians won 9 seats, Party for Democratic Action won 7 seats, Movement for Reforms list won 5 seats, the SNS-led list won 2 seats and the Democratic Union of Albanians won 1 seat. No irregularities were reported at the election.

Party	Votes	%	Seats
Alternative for Changes	6,020	33.88	14
Democratic Party of Albanians	4,173	23.48	9
Party for Democratic Action	3,368	18.95	7
Movement for Reforms	2,545	14.32	5
SNS–SPS–PUPS–SRS–JS–PS–SD–SSZ	1,222	6.88	2
Democratic Union of Albanians	441	2.48	1
Total	17,769	100.00	38
Valid votes	17,769	98.43	
Invalid/blank votes	283	1.57	
Total votes	18,052	100.00	
Registered voters/turnout	41,847	43.14	
Source: Južne Vesti

=== Mionica ===
The election in Mionica was held due to the expiry of the term of the previous assembly elected in 2017.

Together with PUPS, SNS submitted their common list on 2 September, while the Alliance 90/Greens of Serbia party submitted their ballot on 24 September and the NADA on 28 September. SPS decided to cooperate with the Serbian Radical Party (SRS) to form a common list which was submitted on 29 September. Besides these lists, ZS and two civic groups, the "Free Citizens of Mionica" and "Democracy on the old place", participated in the local election. During the election campaign, environmental protection minister Irena Vujović and Momirović were spotted in Mionica.

In the Municipality of Mionica, there were 10,989 eligible citizens to vote in the local election. The local Election Commission reported that the turnout was 69%. The list headed by SNS won 31 seats and followed by them, the list headed by the SPS won 4 seats, while the "Free Citizens of Mionica" and NADA won 2 seats respectively.

Party	Votes	%	Seats
Aleksandar Vučić–For Our Children (Serbian Progressive Party, Party of United Pensioners of Serbia)	5,489	73.32	31
Ivica Dačić–"Socialist Party of Serbia (SPS), Serbian Radical Party (SRS)"	846	11.30	4
Free Citizens of Mionica	425	5.68	2
Hope for Mionica–Movement for the Restoration of the Kingdom of Serbia (POKS)–Democratic Party of Serbia (DSS)–National Democratic Alternative–Dr. Miloš Jovanović–Žika Gojković	370	4.94	2
Alliance 90/Greens of Serbia	156	2.08	–
Citizens' Group: Democracy on the Old Place–Milan Gavrilović Ćićovan	127	1.70	–
Healthy Serbia For the Health of Mionica–Milan Stamatović	73	0.98	–
Total	7,486	100.00	39
Valid votes	7,486	97.44	
Invalid/blank votes	197	2.56	
Total votes	7,683	100.00	
Registered voters/turnout	10,989	69.92	
Source: Municipality of Mionica

Incumbent mayor Boban Janković of the Progressives was confirmed for another term in office after the election.

=== Negotin ===
On 4 September, SNS and SPS submitted a common list for the election with Vladimir Veličković, an SNS commissioner in Negotin, as the ballot carrier. SRS submitted their ballot on 19 September, and on the same day the Election Commission accepted it. Vuk Jeremić, the leader of the People's Party (Narodna), announced on 15 September that his party will be participating the upcoming local election in Negotin, after boycotting previous local and nationwide elections since 2020. Jeremić also stated that "the decision wasn't made easy" and that the upcoming election will be an "experiment" regarding the electoral conditions. On 22 September, they submitted their list, with Krsta Stanković Njenulović as the ballot carrier. Boris Tadić, the leader of the Social Democratic Party, criticised this move by comparing this situation to when his party was declared "traitorous" because it violated the boycott decision in 2020. NADA submitted their list on 24 September, six days after they began their electoral campaign. PUPS formally submitted their ballot list on 18 September, although they weren't able to qualify because 245 signatures were missing. In late September, the Alliance 90/Greens of Serbia submitted their ballot. Their election list, together with Healthy Serbia's list, was accepted on 1 October. In total, six lists participated in the election.

In the Municipality of Negotin, there were 37,313 eligible citizens to vote in the local election. The Election Commission reported that the turnout was 39%, and the list headed by SNS won 38 seats and followed by them, Narodna won 6 seats and the Alliance 90/Greens of Serbia won one seat.

Physical attacks towards opposition activists took place during voting, while Narodna alleged that the "SNS stole about 20% of votes and gave it away to lists that didn't manage to pass the electoral threshold", and that they will file complaints as soon as possible. On 20 October, the Election Commission announced that they rejected the objections. POKS and SPS have both stated that they are satisfied with their results.

Party	Votes	%	Seats
SNS–SPS	11,119	77.93	38
People's Party	1,887	13.23	6
Alliance 90/Greens of Serbia	510	3.57	1
National Democratic Alternative	322	2.26	0
Serbian Radical Party	241	1.69	0
Healthy Serbia	189	1.32	0
Total	14,268	100.00	45
Valid votes	14,268	96.05	
Invalid/blank votes	586	3.95	
Total votes	14,854	100.00	
Registered voters/turnout	37,313	39.81	
Source: City of Negotin

== Aftermath ==
SNS won the most seats in all municipalities, except Preševo, where they only won two seats. One of the major opposition candidates in Zaječar was Nenad Ristović who placed third in the 2017 Zaječar local election. After the 2021 election, Ristović pledged again to not cooperate with SNS. However, Ristović was later featured on the SNS list for the 2022 parliamentary election. Ničić was successfully re-elected as mayor in May 2021. SNS successfully formed local governments in Kosjerić, Mionica and Negotin.
