= Slobodan Nikolić =

Slobodan Nikolić may refer to:

- Slobodan Nikolić (basketball)
- Slobodan Nikolić (politician)
