= Ardita Sinani =

Serbian politician (born 1980)

- Ардита Синани
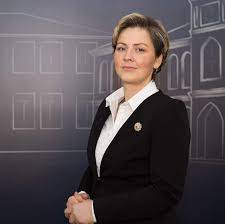

Mayor of Preševo
- Incumbent
- Assumed office 30 July 2024
- Preceded by: Ragmi Mustafa
- In office 12 May 2021 – 11 April 2022
- Preceded by: Shqiprim Arifi
- Succeeded by: Shqiprim Arifi
- In office 13 March 2017 – 15 September 2017
- Preceded by: Shqiprim Arifi
- Succeeded by: Shqiprim Arifi

Personal details
- Born: 15 November 1980 (age 45) Preševo, SFR Yugoslavia
- Party: Party for Democratic Action
- Occupation: Politician

Ardita Sinani (Serbian Cyrillic: Ардита Синани; born 15 November 1980) is a Serbian politician of Albanian origin currently serving as the mayor of Preševo. She succeeded Shqiprim Arifi in a new coalition arrangement in the 2021 Serbian local elections.

== Political positions ==
Ardita Sinani supports the inclusion of the future status of the Albanians in the Preševo valley in the negotiations between Belgrade and Pristina. She has openly proposed that the valley should get the same status as North Kosovo or become part of Kosovo.
