= 2023 Serbian parliamentary election =

- 17 December 2023
- All 250 seats in the National Assembly; 126 seats needed for a majority
- Opinion polls
- Turnout: 58.77% (▲0.24pp)
Electoral list	Leader	Vote %	Seats	+/–
AV–SNSDS	Miloš Vučević (Note: Vučević was the president of the Serbian Progressive Party and the first candidate on the list, while Aleksandar Vučić, the president of Serbia, was its ballot carrier but not a candidate.)	48.07	129	+9
SPN	Marinika Tepić, Miroslav Aleksić	24.32	65	+25
SPS–JS–Zeleni	Ivica Dačić	6.73	18	−13
NADA	Miloš Jovanović	5.16	13	−1
MI–GIN	Branimir Nestorović	4.82	13	New
Minority lists
VMSZ	Bálint Pásztor	1.74	6	+1
SPP–DSHV	Usame Zukorlić	0.78	2	−2
SDAS	Sulejman Ugljanin	0.59	2	0
PBASN	Shaip Kamberi	0.36	1	0
RS–NKPJ	Slobodan Nikolić	0.31	1	New
This lists parties that won seats. See the complete results below.
Most voted-for party by municipality
Prime Minister before	Prime Minister after
Ana Brnabić; SNS	Miloš Vučević; SNS

Early parliamentary elections were held in Serbia on 17 December 2023 to elect members of the National Assembly. The elections were originally due by 30 April 2026; Aleksandar Vučić, the president of Serbia, dissolved the National Assembly and called a snap election on 1 November 2023, on the proposal of the government. In addition to the parliamentary elections, the Vojvodina provincial election and local elections were held in 65 cities and municipalities, including the capital, Belgrade.

In the 2022 parliamentary election, the ruling Serbian Progressive Party (SNS) lost its parliamentary majority, while opposition parties returned to the National Assembly. Ana Brnabić, prime minister since 2017, formed her third cabinet in October 2022. In 2023, Branko Ružić resigned from the cabinet and Rade Basta was dismissed. The cabinet also faced the North Kosovo crisis and, from May to November 2023, anti-government protests triggered by the Belgrade school shooting and a mass murder near Mladenovac and Smederevo. Opposition parties organising the protests formed the Serbia Against Violence (SPN) coalition in October.

The campaign was met with an increase in political tensions, polarisation, and voter intimidation. Candidates campaigned on issues such as fighting against crime and corruption, decreasing inflation, and the Ohrid Agreement. The Republic Electoral Commission proclaimed 18 electoral lists for the parliamentary election. Monitoring and non-governmental organisations reported that election day was marked by electoral fraud, mostly in the Belgrade region. ODIHR concluded that the elections were well organised, but that SNS had a systematic advantage in the election and abused public funds. SNS regained its parliamentary majority, despite opinion polls predicting a decrease in support. We – Voice from the People, led by conspiracy theorist Branimir Nestorović, unexpectedly won representation in the National Assembly. Mass protests were held in December, with SPN and other organisers calling for the annulment of election results. Miloš Vučević of SNS later formed his cabinet in May 2024.

== Background ==
A populist coalition, led by the Serbian Progressive Party (SNS), came to power after the 2012 election, along with the Socialist Party of Serbia (SPS). Aleksandar Vučić, who initially served as deputy prime minister of Serbia and later as prime minister of Serbia, was elected president of Serbia in 2017 and re-elected in 2022. Since he came to power, observers have assessed that Serbia has suffered from democratic backsliding into authoritarianism, followed by a decline in media freedom and civil liberties. In 2023, the V-Dem Institute categorised Serbia as an electoral autocracy, while Freedom House noted that SNS "eroded political rights and civil liberties, put pressure on independent media, the opposition, and civil society organisations".

The Together We Can Do Everything coalition, which was led by SNS, lost its parliamentary majority in the 2022 parliamentary election, in which twelve electoral lists, several of them from the opposition, won seats. Non-governmental organisations (NGOs) and election monitors reported that electoral irregularities occurred during the voting day. Following the election, the United for the Victory of Serbia (UZPS) coalition, which placed second, was dissolved due to inter-coalition conflicts. Brnabić, who had been prime minister since 2017, was sworn in alongside her third cabinet on 26 October 2022. Rade Basta, a minister in Brnabić's cabinet, voiced his support for introducing sanctions on Russia in March 2023. SPS and United Serbia (JS) later proposed his dismissal, which the National Assembly approved in July 2023. In May 2023, Vučić was succeeded by Miloš Vučević as president of SNS.

=== North Kosovo crisis ===
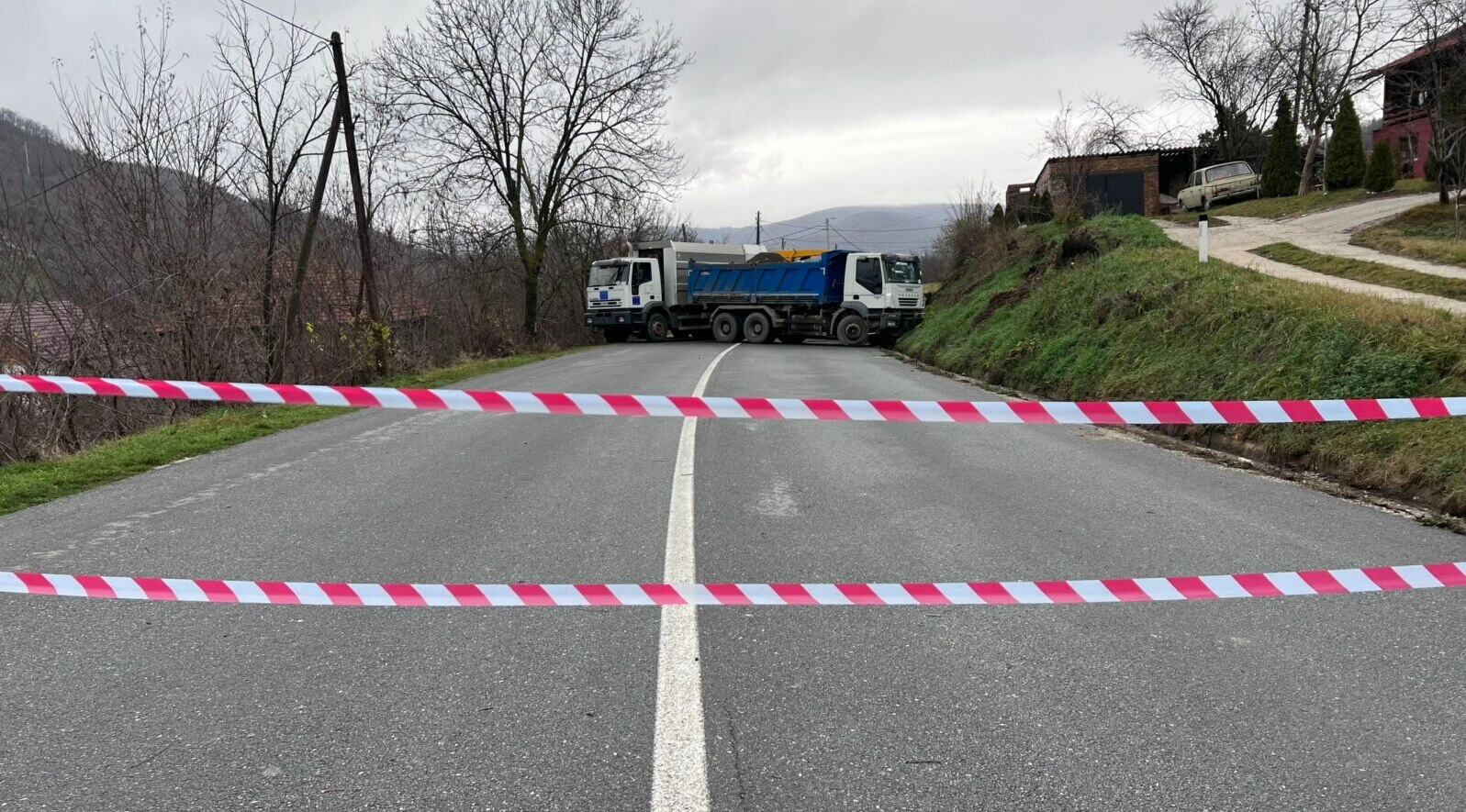
Tensions between Serbia and Kosovo escalated in July 2022

Tensions between Serbia and Kosovo escalated in July 2022, initially due to the expiry of an eleven-year validity period for car documentation. This was resolved in August following negotiations with the diplomatic representatives of the European Union (EU). The agreement went into effect on 1 September, with the deadline for obtaining new car documents set for 31 October 2022. A proposed agreement to normalise tensions between the two countries, later informally known as the Ohrid Agreement, was sent to Serbia and Kosovo by diplomats Jens Plötner and Emmanuel Bonne, and was leaked in September 2022. Its existence was confirmed by Serbia and Kosovo a month later. Just before the car document expiry deadline, Kosovo prime minister Albin Kurti announced a phased implementation lasting until 21 April 2023. In protest of the announcement, hundreds of Kosovo Serb police officers, mayors, and Serb List politicians resigned from their positions. After negotiations with the EU, another agreement regarding documents was reached in November 2022; it was announced that licence plates issued by Serbia would continue to be in use in North Kosovo.

After claims that the Regional Operational Support Unit (ROSU) allegedly raided North Mitrovica in December 2022, Serbia announced that it would deploy Serbian forces to Kosovo. The government of Kosovo denied that ROSU entered North Mitrovica, while Kosovo Force rejected Serbia's request to deploy Serbian forces to Kosovo. Amidst this, barricades were put up in North Kosovo and ultranationalist protests were organised in Belgrade. Negotiations between Serbia and Kosovo continued, and in March 2023 Vučić and Kurti verbally agreed to implement the Ohrid Agreement.

An attack perpetrated by Serb militants occurred on 24 September 2023 in Banjska, a village in North Kosovo. The attack resulted in the death of one Kosovo Police officer and three Serb militants. Milan Radoičić, a businessman and member of the Serb List, admitted his involvement in the attack; he was later arrested by the Serbian government, but the Supreme Court rejected the request to detain Radoičić for 30 days and he was released. Serbia declared 27 September a national day of mourning for the three Serb militants killed in the attack. Kosovo alleged that the Serb participants had close relations with Vučić and the government of Serbia. The European Parliament adopted a resolution calling for measures against Serbia if it was proven to have been directly involved in the attack.

=== 2023 protests ===
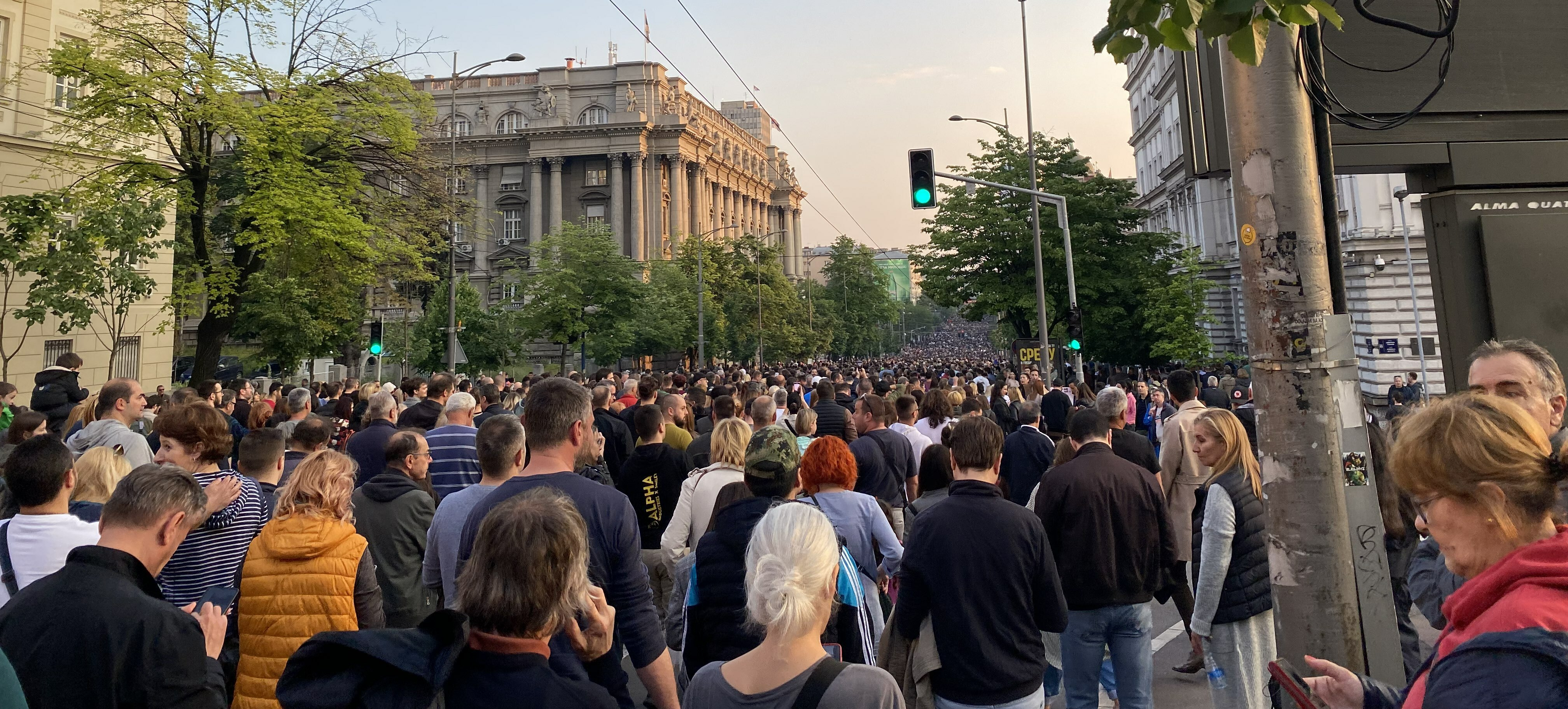
Demonstrators on 19 May 2023

The Belgrade school shooting and a mass murder near Mladenovac and Smederevo occurred in May 2023. The government responded by adopting measures such as stricter regulations on gun ownership and hiring 1,200 police officers for schools. The response was also criticised, particularly due to the statement of Branko Ružić, the minister of education, who said that "a cancerous, pernicious influence of the Internet, video games, and so-called Western values, is evident" (evidentan je kancerogen, poguban uticaj interneta video igrica, takozvanih zapadnih vrednosti) in the shooting, and Brnabić, who said that the "system did not fail" (sistem nije zakazao) when responding to the claims that the government could have stopped the shootings.

This resulted in mass protests, named Serbia Against Violence, which began on 8 May. Tens of thousands of demonstrators attended the protests. Despite being organised by the Democratic Party (DS), Do not let Belgrade drown (NDB), Party of Freedom and Justice (SSP), People's Party (Narodna), and Together opposition parties, no party signs were reported to be seen at the protests. In response to Serbia Against Violence protests, Vučić held an SNS-organised gathering on 26 May. The protests were organised in Belgrade and other cities from May to November 2023.

In response to the shootings, Ružić announced his resignation a day before the protests began. Đorđe Milićević was appointed as acting minister and was succeeded by Slavica Đukić Dejanović in late July 2023. As part of the protest demands, organisers filed a motion in the National Assembly in early July 2023 to dismiss interior minister Bratislav Gašić, but it was unsuccessful.

== Electoral system ==
The 250 members of the National Assembly are elected by closed-list proportional representation from a single nationwide constituency. Eligible voters vote for electoral lists, on which the candidates of the accepted lists are present. A maximum of 250 candidates could be present on a single electoral list. An electoral list could be submitted by a registered political party, a coalition of political parties, or a citizens' group (grupa građana). To submit an electoral list, at least 10,000 valid signatures must be collected, though ethnic minority parties only need to collect 5,000 signatures to qualify on the ballot. At least 40% of candidates on electoral lists must be female. The electoral list is submitted by its chosen representative or representatives. An electoral list could be declined, after which those who submitted it can fix the deficiencies in a span of 48 hours, or rejected, if the person is not authorised to nominate candidates. The name and date of the election, names of the electoral lists and its representatives, and information on how to vote are only present on the voting ballot.

The Republic Electoral Commission (RIK), local election commissions, and polling boards oversee the election. Seats are allocated using the d'Hondt method with an electoral threshold of 3% of all votes cast, although the threshold is waived for ethnic minority parties. The seats are distributed by dividing the total number of votes received by the electoral list participating in the distribution of seats by each number from one to 250. If two or more electoral lists receive the same quotients on the basis of which the seat is distributed, the electoral list that received the greater number of votes has priority. Parliamentary seats are awarded to candidates from electoral lists according to their order, starting with the first candidate from an electoral list.

A parliamentary election is called by the president of Serbia, who must also announce its date and dissolve the National Assembly in the process. To vote, a person must be a citizen and resident of Serbia and at least 18 years old. Those who live abroad are able to vote at diplomatic missions. At least five days before the election, citizens are notified about the election; they receive information about the day and time of the election and the address of the polling station where they can vote. Election silence begins two days before the day of the election and lasts until the closure of all polling stations. On election day, eligible voters are able to vote from 07:00 (UTC+01:00) to 20:00, except that if the polling station opens later than 07:00, voting is then extended by the amount of time by which its opening was delayed. Voters who cannot vote at a polling station due to illness, old age, or disability must inform their election commission before 11:00 on election day so that they can vote from home after 11:00.

=== Election date ===
The National Assembly is elected for a four-year term; following the April 2022 election, the next regular parliamentary election was due by 30 April 2026, although an early election may be called if the National Assembly is dissolved. In April 2023, newspaper Danas reported that the parliamentary elections, local elections, the Vojvodina provincial elections, and the Belgrade City Assembly elections could be held as early as November 2023. Shortly after the beginning of the 2023 protests, Vučić hinted that snap elections could take place before September 2023. Vučić continued to hint that early parliamentary elections could be held either in September or December 2023, or concurrently with the local and Vojvodina provincial elections in April or May 2024. By law, the Vojvodina provincial election and regular local elections could have been held as late as 30 June 2024.

Newspaper Nova and news portal N1 reported in September 2023 that the government considered 19 December as the date for local, provincial, and parliamentary elections. Vučić and Vučević also held a gathering with officials from Vojvodina on 5 September, to discuss the Vojvodina provincial election. The 17 December date was later mentioned by Vučić on 27 September. The decision to hold snap elections was confirmed a day later at a government session. For the election to take place on 17 December, the government of Serbia had to formally propose to dissolve the National Assembly between 18 October and 2 November. The president of Serbia then had 72 hours to decide whether to dissolve the National Assembly or not. The government of Serbia sent Vučić the proposal to dissolve the National Assembly and organise local elections in 65 cities and municipalities on 30 October. On 1 November, Vučić dissolved the National Assembly and called the elections for 17 December. The official campaign period lasted 46 days. Ognjen Radonjić, a professor at the Faculty of Philosophy, and Dragan Popović, the director of the Centre for Practical Politics, argued that the Banjska attack was one of the main reasons why Vučić announced early elections. The Assembly of Vojvodina dissolved itself on 16 November, setting the provincial election date for 17 December.

The 2023 parliamentary election was the first parliamentary election to be held in the winter season since the 2007 parliamentary election, which was held on 21 January. Dejan Bursać, a teaching associate at the Institute for Political Studies, argued that ruling parties "avoid the winter for voting because the voters are more dissatisfied, the turnout cannot be easily controlled because of the weather, and the costs to the people are increased" (izbegavaju zimu za glasanje jer su glasači nezadovoljniji, a ne može se ni izlaznost lako kontrolisati zbog vremena i uz to su povećani troškovi ljudima). Ivana Petronijević Terzić, a Demostat journalist, also listed increased inflation, higher heating bills, and worse weather conditions among the reasons, but also said that these reasons would be a problem in a democratic society. In preparation for the elections, RIK began acquiring election equipment, including ballot boxes, UV lamps, and finger sprays, on 13 October.

=== Election conditions ===
A group of opposition parties, led by the Forward to Europe (PE) and Green–Left Front (ZLF) parliamentary groups, sent a joint letter to Organization for Security and Co-operation in Europe (OSCE) and other election observers in Serbia in September 2023, asking them to assess the election conditions ahead of the upcoming elections. PE and ZLF alleged that the conditions had worsened since the 2022 parliamentary election and said that the organisations should consider assessing the elections as neither free nor democratic if the recommendations of the Office for Democratic Institutions and Human Rights (ODIHR) were not implemented. In an Insajder interview, political scientist Cvijetin Milivojević also claimed that the conditions were worse in comparison with the previous election, but added that the short campaign period left little time to improve them. Bursać and Jovana Đurbabić from NGO and monitoring organisation Centre for Research, Transparency, and Accountability (CRTA) listed "unequal access to the media, campaign of party officials, and control of the elections at the polling stations" (nejednak pristup medijima, funkcionerska kampanja i kontrola samih izbora na biračkom mestu) as the three main problems of the election conditions in Serbia.

After PE and ZLF, Brnabić also called OSCE and ODIHR in October 2023 to monitor the elections, while accusing opposition parties of seeking foreign interference and of trying to create the impression that elections in Serbia were neither free nor democratic. Brnabić claimed that the government of Serbia adopted most of the ODIHR recommendations and that election conditions had improved. In its analysis, CRTA claimed that conditions were only improved in administrative aspects and that recommendations related to voter pressure, misuse of public resources, and media coverage remained unfulfilled. ODIHR announced that it would monitor the elections and that it would deploy 30 long-term observers and 250 short-term observers on election day. The National Youth Council of Serbia (KOMS) and a delegation of the Parliamentary Assembly of the Council of Europe (PACE) also announced that they would monitor the elections. RIK announced that 5,587 observers would monitor the elections in total.

The Committee for Culture and Information of the National Assembly amended the ban on campaign of party officials, extending it to 30 days, as part of the proposed changes to the Law on Public Information and Media which the National Assembly adopted on 26 October. On the same day, the National Assembly also appointed general manager of the National Theatre Svetislav Goncić, political scientist Aleksandar Milosavljević, professor Dragan Vučinić, political scientist Jovanka Matić, science advisor Slobodan Prvanović, professor Branko Rakić, law counselor Miodrag Savović, professor Bojan Tubić, scientist Vojin Vučićević, and opera singer Aleksandar Stamatović as members of the supervisory board for the Election Campaign, which was established on 13 November.

In mid-November 2023, ODIHR announced that it had requested that the votes of Serbian citizens in Kosovo be collected there. Kurti responded by saying that "Kosovo and Serbia must reach a special agreement so that members of the Serbian community in Kosovo, who have dual citizenship, could vote on the territory of Kosovo in the Serbian parliamentary elections". On 23 November, RIK announced that there were no conditions to organise elections in Kosovo and that voters from Kosovo could instead exercise their right to vote in Serbian cities of Vranje, Kuršumlija, Raška, and Tutin. The European Union criticised Kosovo for refusing to allow the Serbian parliamentary election to be held on its territory.

=== Political parties ===
The table below lists political parties and coalitions elected to the National Assembly after the 2022 parliamentary election. Out of 19 electoral lists, only 7 crossed the 3% threshold while 5 minority electoral lists crossed the waived electoral threshold. The official results were postponed until 5 July 2022, due to the repeated voting in Veliki Trnovac, where a seat in the National Assembly was contested between SPS and the Albanian Coalition of Preševo Valley (KSLP), led by the Party for Democratic Action. At the fifth repeat election, held on 30 June, KSLP won enough votes to earn a seat in the National Assembly.

Name	Ideology	Political position	Leader(s)	2022 result	
Name	Ideology	Political position	Leader(s)	Votes (%)	Seats
Together We Can Do Everything	Populism	Big tent	Aleksandar Vučić	44.27%	120 / 250
United for the Victory of Serbia	Anti-corruption	Centre	Marinika Tepić	14.09%	38 / 250
SPS–JS–Zeleni	Populism	Big tent	Ivica Dačić	11.79%	31 / 250
National Democratic Alternative	National conservatism	Right-wing	Vojislav Mihailović	5.54%	15 / 250
We Must	Green politics	Centre-left to left-wing	Nebojša Zelenović	4.84%	13 / 250
Dveri–POKS	Serbian nationalism	Right-wing to far-right	Boško Obradović	3.92%	10 / 250
Serbian Party Oathkeepers	Ultranationalism	Far-right	Milica Đurđević; Stamenkovski	3.82%	10 / 250
Alliance of Vojvodina Hungarians	Hungarian minority interests		István Pásztor	1.63%	5 / 250
Justice and Reconciliation Party	Bosniak minority interests		Usame Zukorlić	0.97%	3 / 250
DSHV–ZZV	Croat minority interests		Tomislav Žigmanov	0.65%	2 / 250
SDA Sandžaka	Bosniak minority interests		Sulejman Ugljanin	0.56%	2 / 250
Party for Democratic Action	Albanian minority interests		Shaip Kamberi	0.27%	1 / 250
Source: Republic Bureau of Statistics

=== Pre-election composition ===
The thirteenth convocation of the National Assembly held its constitutive session on 1 August 2022, at which the parliamentary composition was formalised. Vladimir Orlić of SNS was elected president of the National Assembly on 2 August, while Sandra Božić (SNS), Snežana Paunović (SPS), Elvira Kovács (Alliance of Vojvodina Hungarians, VMSZ), Usame Zukorlić (Justice and Reconciliation Party, SPP), Božidar Delić (National Democratic Alternative, NADA), Borko Stefanović (Party of Freedom and Justice, SSP), and Zoran Lutovac (DS) were elected vice-presidents. Delić died shortly after taking office and was replaced by Vojislav Mihailović in November 2022. The composition of the National Assembly changed after the first session; for example, the European Regions, a parliamentary group composed of minority interest parties, briefly existed until October 2022. The last session of the thirteenth convocation was held from 23 to 26 October. The National Assembly was dissolved on 1 November 2023.

Parliamentary composition at dissolution (1 November 2023)
Groups	Parties	MPs	
Groups	Parties	Seats	Total
Aleksandar Vučić – Together We Can Do Everything	SNS	99	109
Aleksandar Vučić – Together We Can Do Everything	PSS–BK	3	109
Aleksandar Vučić – Together We Can Do Everything	SNP	2	109
Aleksandar Vučić – Together We Can Do Everything	PS	2	109
Aleksandar Vučić – Together We Can Do Everything	SPO	2	109
Aleksandar Vučić – Together We Can Do Everything	NSS	1	109
Ivica Dačić – Socialist Party of Serbia (SPS)	SPS	22	23
Ivica Dačić – Socialist Party of Serbia (SPS)	Zeleni	1	23
Forward to Europe – SSP, PSG, Reversal, Sloga	SSP	9	15
Forward to Europe – SSP, PSG, Reversal, Sloga	PSG	3	15
Forward to Europe – SSP, PSG, Reversal, Sloga	PZP	1	15
Forward to Europe – SSP, PSG, Reversal, Sloga	USS Sloga	1	15
Forward to Europe – SSP, PSG, Reversal, Sloga	Fatherland	1	15
NADA – New DSS – POKS	NDSS	7	14
NADA – New DSS – POKS	POKS	7	14
Democratic Party – DS	DS	10	10
United Serbia – Dragan Marković Palma	JS	7	8
People's Party	Narodna	8	8
People's Movement of Serbia – Ecological Uprising – New Face of Serbia	NPS	4	8
People's Movement of Serbia – Ecological Uprising – New Face of Serbia	EU	3	8
People's Movement of Serbia – Ecological Uprising – New Face of Serbia	NLS	1	8
Serbian Party Oathkeepers	SSZ	8	8
Social Democratic Party of Serbia	SDPS	7	7
PUPS – Solidarity and Justice	PUPS	6	6
Serbian Movement Dveri – Patriotic Bloc	Dveri	6	6
For Reconciliation SPP–USS–DSHV	SPP	2	6
For Reconciliation SPP–USS–DSHV	DSHV	1	6
For Reconciliation SPP–USS–DSHV	USS	1	6
For Reconciliation SPP–USS–DSHV	SNS	1	6
For Reconciliation SPP–USS–DSHV	Ind.	1	6
We Must – Together	Together	5	5
Alliance of Vojvodina Hungarians	VMSZ/SVM	5	5
Green–Left Front, Do not let Belgrade drown	ZLF	5	5
Deputies not members of parliamentary groups	SDAS	1	7
Deputies not members of parliamentary groups	NN–IJS	1	7
Deputies not members of parliamentary groups	PVD/PDD	1	7
Deputies not members of parliamentary groups	SSD	1	7
Deputies not members of parliamentary groups	ZZV	1	7
Deputies not members of parliamentary groups	Ind.	2	7

== Pre-election activities ==
=== Government parties ===
Vučić hinted at a potential formation of a bloc or a movement in September 2022, which he later revealed in March 2023 to be the People's Movement for the State (NPZD). He said that NPZD would act as a "supra-party movement" (nadstranački pokret) and that SNS would not be dissolved. Vučević confirmed that SNS would take part in the movement. Initially announced to be formalised in May 2023, the date was subsequently moved towards autumn 2023. Political commentators on N1 pointed out that the delay may stem from internal divisions within the SPS over whether to join the NPZD. Predrag J. Marković, one of the vice-presidents of SPS, said that the identity of SPS would cease to exist if it joined the movement. Considering that NPZD was not mentioned at the main board session of SNS in October 2023, analyst Đorđe Vukadinović of Nova srpska politička misao (NSPM) and political analyst Dragomir Anđelković argued that NPZD might serve only as a rallying cry for the upcoming elections. Vučić, however, announced in late October 2023 that NPZD would be formed "in the coming period".

Tomislav Žigmanov, the president of the Democratic Alliance of Croats in Vojvodina (DSHV), announced in October 2023 that DSHV would contest the 2023 election in an electoral alliance, with the justification being "because minorities in Serbia do not have guaranteed seats in the parliament" (jer u Srbiji manjine nemaju garantovana mesta u parlamentu). Rasim Ljajić, the president of the Social Democratic Party of Serbia (SDPS), announced that his party would contest the elections with SNS again. Healthy Serbia, led by Milan Stamatović, was announced as an addition to the SNS-led coalition. Additionally, SNS and SPS announced that they would not contest the parliamentary election together and that SPS would again take part in the election with JS and Greens of Serbia (Zeleni).

=== Opposition parties ===
After the dissolution of the UZPS coalition, SSP, the Movement of Free Citizens, the Movement for Reversal, and United Trade Unions of Serbia Sloga formed the Ujedinjeni parliamentary group in the National Assembly in August 2022. Ujedinjeni changed its name to Forward to Europe in July 2023. Zdravko Ponoš, the presidential candidate of the UZPS coalition, left Narodna after the 2022 elections. In June 2022, he formed the Serbia Centre (SRCE) organisation, which was then registered as a political party in July 2023.

The We Must alliance was also dissolved after the 2022 elections, but its member parties said that they would continue cooperating in the National Assembly. Together was formed in June 2022 as a merger of Together for Serbia, Ecological Uprising, and the Assembly of Free Serbia, with Aleksandar Jovanović Ćuta, Biljana Stojković, and Nebojša Zelenović as co-presidents. Solidarity, which was also affiliated with the We Must alliance, merged into Together in January 2023. In August 2023, Ćuta and other members of Ecological Uprising left Together and joined the parliamentary group led by People's Movement of Serbia (NPS). NDB announced in late June 2022 that it had adopted a platform to work on becoming a registered political party; it began collecting signatures in May 2023. NDB also announced that it would rename itself the Green–Left Front (ZLF). ZLF was formalised in July 2023.

Within Narodna, an alleged dispute between its president Vuk Jeremić and vice-president Miroslav Aleksić began in June 2023. Aleksić was removed from the party's executive board in July 2023; he then publicly acknowledged the conflict between him and Jeremić. Although a leadership election was scheduled for October 2023, Aleksić left Narodna and reconstituted NPS in August 2023. With Miloš Parandilović, the president of the New Face of Serbia (NLS), he formed a parliamentary group in the National Assembly.

After his dismissal, Basta left JS and formed the European Way Movement (PEP), now portraying himself as an opposition politician. Mladen Mrdalj, a political scientist, criticised Basta as an opportunist. PEP announced in September 2023 that it would contest the upcoming elections. Besides Basta, former SNS-turned-opposition politicians Zorana Mihajlović, Dragan Šormaz, and Stanislava Pak formed the Always for Serbia organisation in September 2023. Opposition parties organising the Serbia Against Violence protests refused to cooperate with them because of their former ties to SNS.

==== Election alliances ====
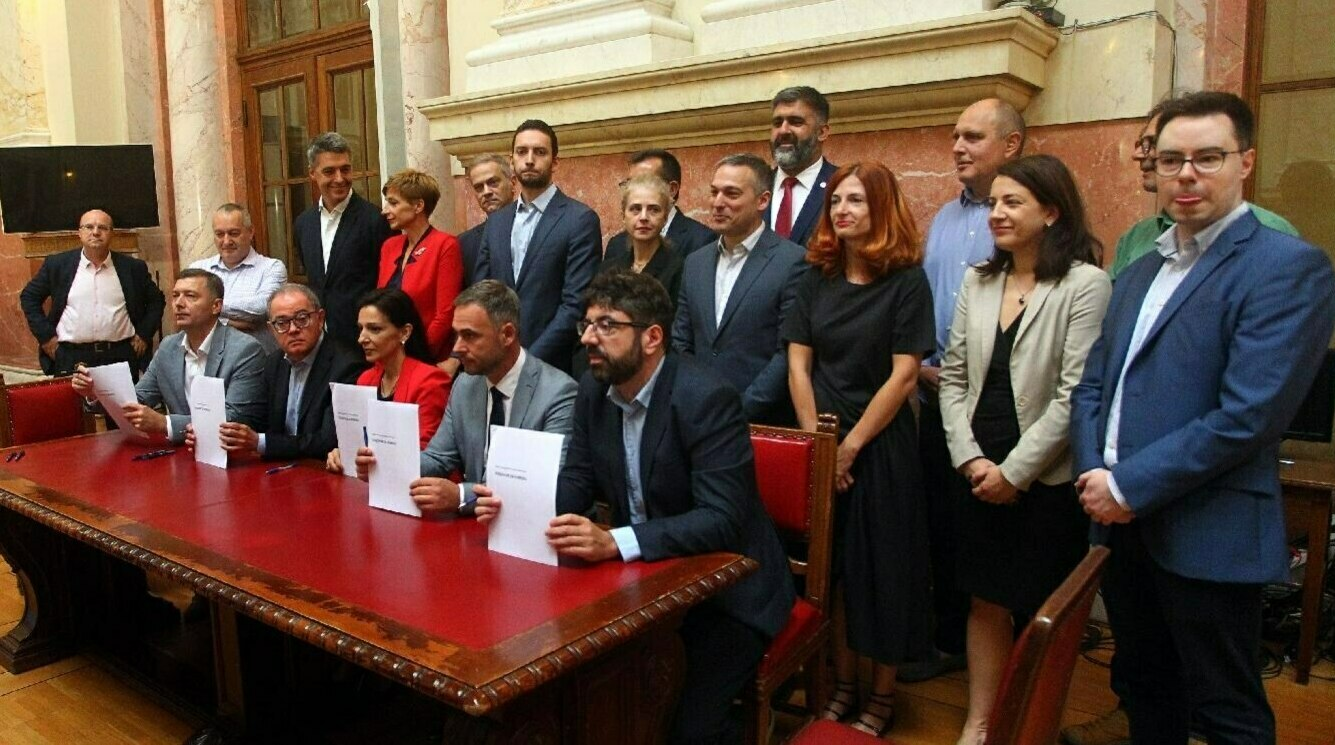
Opposition parties organising the Serbia Against Violence protests (representatives pictured) formed a joint coalition in October 2023

In an interview for newspaper Nova in August 2023, Marinika Tepić, one of the vice-presidents of SSP, said that an electoral alliance of the parties organising the Serbia Against Violence protests was possible. "During this one year of work in the National Assembly, and especially in these last three months during the protests, we, [opposition parties], managed to build trust stronger than ever before" (Tokom ovih godinu dana rada u Narodnoj skupštini, a naročito u poslednja tri meseca tokom protesta, uspeli da izgradimo poverenje snažno kao nikad do sad), Tepić said. DS, SRCE, Together, and ZLF had been cooperating closely since as early as April 2023. DS, SRCE, and Together signed a cooperation agreement in late August 2023, establishing greater cooperation between the parties. Slobodan Cvejić of SRCE expressed his support for creating even greater cooperation between opposition parties.

Radomir Lazović of ZLF also announced in July 2023 that ZLF prepared framework principles of cooperation to achieve non-aggression among opposition parties, joint control of elections, and consolidation of parties into a bigger alliance. Lazović, however, opposed the creation of a single coalition of all opposition parties, stating that it could possibly lead to the loss of votes. PE member parties, ZLF, DS, Together, NPS, Ecological Uprising, and NLS signed an agreement, titled Agreement for Victory, in late September 2023, announcing joint support for calling snap elections and electoral reforms. At an 18 October press conference, Srđan Milivojević of DS said that there were "no dissonant voices" (nema disonantnih tonova) at the negotiations about the creation of a joint alliance. Nova–DS2P and the Social Democratic Party (SDS), led by former president of Serbia Boris Tadić, both expressed support for joining the opposition alliance. The agreement between the parties was reached on 26 October and the coalition, named Serbia Against Violence (SPN), was formalised and presented to the public a day later.

From the political right, Milica Đurđević Stamenkovski, the president of the Serbian Party Oathkeepers (SSZ), expressed her opposition towards creating a joint opposition alliance due to foreign policy differences. Boško Obradović, the president of Dveri, however, voiced support for the formation of a "state-building bloc" (državotvorni blok) that would include SSZ and National Democratic Alternative (NADA); Obradović added that he also saw Narodna as part of the bloc. Miloš Jovanović, the president of the New Democratic Party of Serbia (NDSS), stated that NADA would be open to cooperating with Dveri and SSZ, while Jeremić called for the formation of a coalition that would include Dveri, SSZ, NADA, and Enough is Enough (DJB). In October 2023, Dveri and SSZ formalised a coalition, named National Gathering (NO), for the upcoming elections; they also invited NADA and Narodna to join their bloc. NADA, however, held separate negotiations with Narodna instead. Additional negotiations between Dveri, SSZ, NADA, and Narodna were held in late October 2023, but the parties were unable to form a joint electoral alliance due to SSZ rejecting the proposed document. Narodna and the Serbian Radical Party (SRS), led by Vojislav Šešelj, opted to take part in the elections independently.

== Electoral lists ==
With the dissolution of the National Assembly and a call for elections to be held on 17 December, the deadline to submit electoral lists was set for 26 November. The collective electoral list was published by RIK on 1 December, with 2,818 candidates listed. The table below lists the electoral lists confirmed by RIK. RIK rejected two lists for insufficient valid signatures: that of PEP, which had submitted its list together with two Bunjevci minority parties, and the Levijatan-led Russian Minority Alliance of Pavle Bihali.

^{M} — National minority list

#	Ballot name	Ballot carrier (Note: Under Article 69 of the Law on the Election of Members of Parliament, the ballot carrier (nosilac liste) is the person whose name is included in the name of the electoral list; they may, but need not, be a candidate on it.)	Main ideology	Political position	Signatures (Note: Number of legally valid statements of support, as determined by RIK.)	Note
1	Aleksandar Vučić – Serbia Must Not Stop; SNS, SDPS, PS, PUPS, SNP, SPO, NSS, USS, ZS, SL, SSD	Aleksandar Vučić (Note: Miloš Vučević is the first candidate on the list.)	Populism	Big tent	88,083	
2	Ivica Dačić – Prime Minister of Serbia; SPS, JS, Zeleni	Ivica Dačić	Populism	Big tent	19,618	
3	Dr Vojislav Šešelj – Serbian Radical Party; SRS	Vojislav Šešelj	Ultranationalism	Far-right	10,638	
4	Milica Đurđević Stamenkovski – Boško Obradović – National Gathering – State-Building Force – Serbian Party Oathkeepers – Serbian Movement Dveri; SSZ, Dveri, BPS	Milica Đurđević Stamenkovski; Boško Obradović	Ultranationalism	Far-right	11,896	
5	Dr Miloš Jovanović – NADA for Serbia – Serbian coalition NADA – National Democratic Alternative – New Democratic Party of Serbia (New DSS) – Movement for the Restoration of the Kingdom of Serbia (POKS) – Vojislav Mihailović; NDSS, POKS	Miloš Jovanović; Vojislav Mihailović	National conservatism	Right-wing	10,381	
6	Alliance of Vojvodina Hungarians – For Our President, For Our Community, For the Future!; VMSZ/SVM	None (Note: Bálint Pásztor is the first candidate on the list.)	Hungarian minority interests	Centre-right	11,137	^{M}
7	Serbia Against Violence – Miroslav Miki Aleksić – Marinika Tepić; SSP, NPS, ZLF, DS, Zajedno, SRCE, EU, PSG, NLS, PZP, USS Sloga, Fatherland, GDP, PR/RP	Miroslav Aleksić; Marinika Tepić (Note: Radomir Lazović is the first candidate on the list.)	Anti-corruption	Big tent	17,680	
8	Usame Zukorlić – United for Justice – Justice and Reconciliation Party – Bosniaks of Sandžak, Tomislav Žigmanov – Democratic Alliance of Croats in Vojvodina; SPP, DSHV	Usame Zukorlić; Tomislav Žigmanov	Bosniak minority interests; Croat minority interests		5,580	^{M}
9	SDA of Sandžak – dr Sulejman Ugljanin; SDAS	Sulejman Ugljanin (Note: Sulejman Ugljanin is not a candidate; Selma Kučević is the first candidate on the list.)	Bosniak minority interests	Right-wing	5,369	^{M}
10	Together for the Future and Development – Coalition for Peace and Tolerance; ZBR, VNS, MPSZ/GSM, DZH, GSGS, VP, SCG, BGS, TS, SJ, UŽRMNMS, UBR	None (Note: Jahja Fehratović is the first candidate on the list.)	Minority interests		5,373	^{M}
11	People's Party – Safe Choice. Serious People – Vuk Jeremić, dr Sanda Rašković Ivić, Siniša Kovačević, Vladimir Gajić, Marina Lipovac Tanasković; Narodna	Vuk Jeremić; Sanda Rašković Ivić; Siniša Kovačević; Vladimir Gajić; Marina Lipovac Tanasković	Conservatism	Right-wing	11,904	
12	Saša Radulović (Enough is Enough – DJB) – Duško Vujošević, Boris Tadić (Social Democratic Party – SDS) – Ana Pejić (Stolen Babies) – Good Morning Serbia; DJB, SDS, OBAP	Saša Radulović; Duško Vujošević; Boris Tadić; Ana Pejić	Anti-Ohrid Agreement		10,534	
13	The Political Struggle of the Albanians Continues – Shaip Kamberi; PVD/PDD, PD, LPD, UDS	Shaip Kamberi	Albanian minority interests		5,242	^{M}
14	We – Voice from the People, prof dr Branimir Nestorović; MI–GIN	Branimir Nestorović	Russophilia	Right-wing	10,104	
15	Serbia in the West – Zoran Vuletić – Nemanja Milošević – Experts Should Have A Say – Vladimir Kovačević; Nova–D2SP, GDF, Libdem, Glas	Zoran Vuletić; Nemanja Milošević; Vladimir Kovačević	Pro-Europeanism	Centre	10,328	
16	Russian Party – Slobodan Nikolić; RS, NKPJ	Slobodan Nikolić	Russophilia		5,211	^{M}
17	Čedomir Jovanović – It Must Be Different; LDP (Note: Candidates on Jovanović's list formally took part under the "Čedomir Jovanović – It Must Be Different" citizens group.)	Čedomir Jovanović	Liberalism	Centre	10,300	
18	Albanian Democratic Alternative – United Valley; APN/AZP, LR/PR	None (Note: Visar Mehmeti is the first candidate on the list.)	Albanian minority interests		5,945	^{M}

== Campaign ==
Political scientist and journalist Aleksandar Ivković argued that the campaign was unprincipled, citing graffiti, posters, music videos, and tabloid content directed against opposition parties. Political scientist Boban Stojanović estimated that the political friction did not decrease and that "political violence will be seen until the end of the election campaign" (političko nasilje biće prisutno do kraja kampanje). During their visit in Serbia, PACE representatives concluded that the campaign was met with polarisation and intimidation from the government. Raša Nedeljkov of CRTA expected a harsh and unfair campaign with bigotry as its cornerstone; he listed the targeting of political opponents, media representatives, civil society organisations, and election observers as examples. CRTA claimed that voter intimidation increased during the campaign period. During the first three weeks of the election campaign, CRTA reported "inequality, suspicions, and threats" (neravnopravnost, sumnje i pretnje) in its analysis, claiming that government parties had a significant advantage due to the abuse of public institutions. During the campaign, the Centre for Investigative Journalism of Serbia (CINS) revealed that a youth group ran a call centre to intimidate voters. The call centre also had a database of voters, sorted by whether they were SNS members, SNS voters, or non-SNS voters.

Shortly before the election was called, Bursać predicted that the campaign would be filled with issues such as the ongoing tensions with Kosovo, jeopardised foreign policy positions due to the tensions with Kosovo, rising prices, and the mass shootings that occurred in May 2023. Vojislav Mihailović, the director of public opinion research at CRTA, said that opposition parties should focus on local issues, the economy, corruption, crime, and violence, noting that respondents in CRTA's polls were most concerned about the economy. Journalists Bojan Bilbija (Politika), Zoran Panović (Demostat), and Miloš Garić (editor-in-chief of Kosovo Online) agreed that economic issues and the North Kosovo crisis would be the main issues of the elections. Vladimir Pejić, the director of Agency Faktor Plus, listed the North Kosovo crisis, economic issues, and the fight against crime and corruption as the main issues of the election. Cvijetin Milivojević and political consultant Nikola Tomić named Kosovo as the main issue. Bojan Klačar of CeSID named living standards, inflation and prices, Kosovo, foreign policy positions, and EU membership as main issues, while Stojanović listed living standards, inflation, and Kosovo as main topics, also claiming that "there will also be enormous pressure on SNS voters, on public sector employees, and blackmailing".

=== Party campaigns ===
==== Government ====
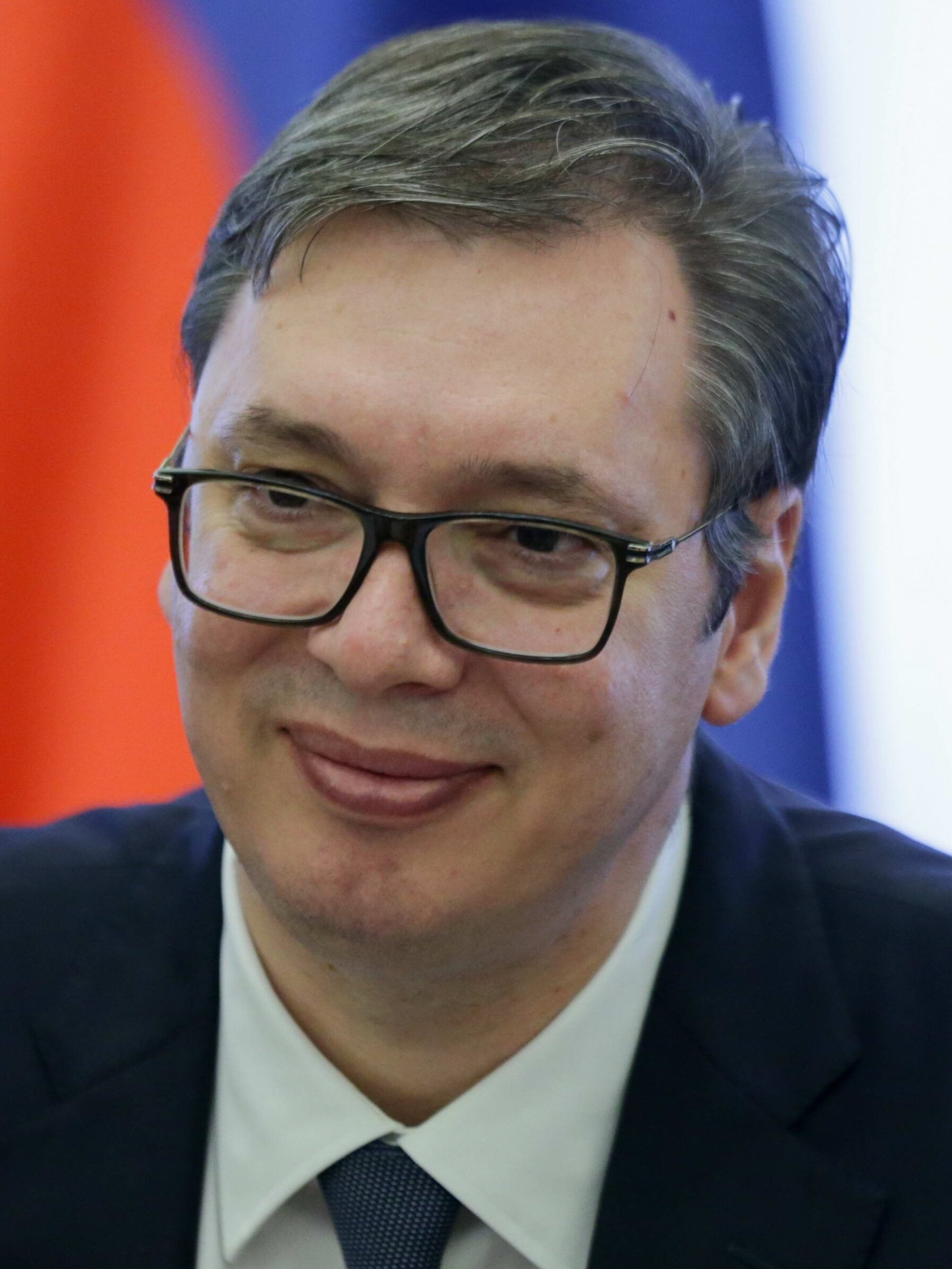
Despite no longer being president of SNS, Vučić mainly represented the party throughout the election campaign.

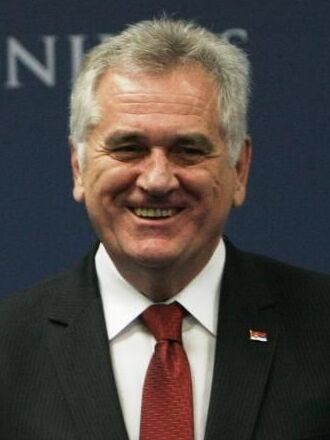
Tomislav Nikolić, former president of Serbia, was featured as a speaker at several rallies, despite retiring in 2017.

SNS campaigned on populist messages. On 29 October, Vučić announced that by 1 December, the government would distribute din. 10,000 (€85) to 170,000 social assistance recipients and 51,000 blind, elderly, and dementia patients, with students also receiving transport discounts. Despite the government denying that this decision would influence the voters, Nemanja Nenadić, from non-profit organisation Transparency Serbia, listed the payouts and discounts as "one of the ways to subtly influence the will of the citizens, to make them think that the government makes concessions to them" (jedan od načina da se malo suptilnije utiče na volju građana, da pomisle kako im vlast čini ustupke). DS filed a complaint with the Anti-Corruption Agency, alleging that Vučić had abused his office to boost SNS in the elections. The Bureau of Social Research (BIRODI) also claimed that Vučić violated Article 40 of the Law on Prevention of Corruption. Zoran Čvorović, a professor at the Faculty of Law of the University of Kragujevac, argued that President Vučić violated the Serbian constitution by being listed as the representative of all SNS-led electoral lists in the 2023 elections. RIK rejected all 15 citizens' complaints about Vučić's name appearing on the SNS-led list although he was not a candidate, saying that "Vučić has agreed on paper for his name to be mentioned on the electoral list" (Vučić pismeno saglasio da svoje ime da jednoj listi). The government of Serbia introduced more populist measures in late November, such as din. 10,000 payouts to high school students.

Although SPS had been SNS's coalition partner since 2012, SPS official Dušan Bajatović was a target of attacks in articles published by pro-government media. During the campaign period, SPS presented itself as "guarantees of political stability" (garant političke stabilnosti) while also expressing support for youth rights and youth activism. Dačić also portrayed the coalition as socialist; while campaigning in Ljubovija, Dačić said that voting for them also meant voting for "patriotism and socialism" (patriotizam i socijalizam). While campaigning in Mrčajevci, Dačić said that the SPS coalition supported free education, free universal health care, and social funds. Dačić also reflected on his opinions about Milošević during the campaign, saying that "Milošević was an example of how to love and defend your country" (Milošević bio primer kako se zemlja voli i brani). The SPS coalition also expressed its support for the accession of Serbia to the EU.

==== Opposition ====
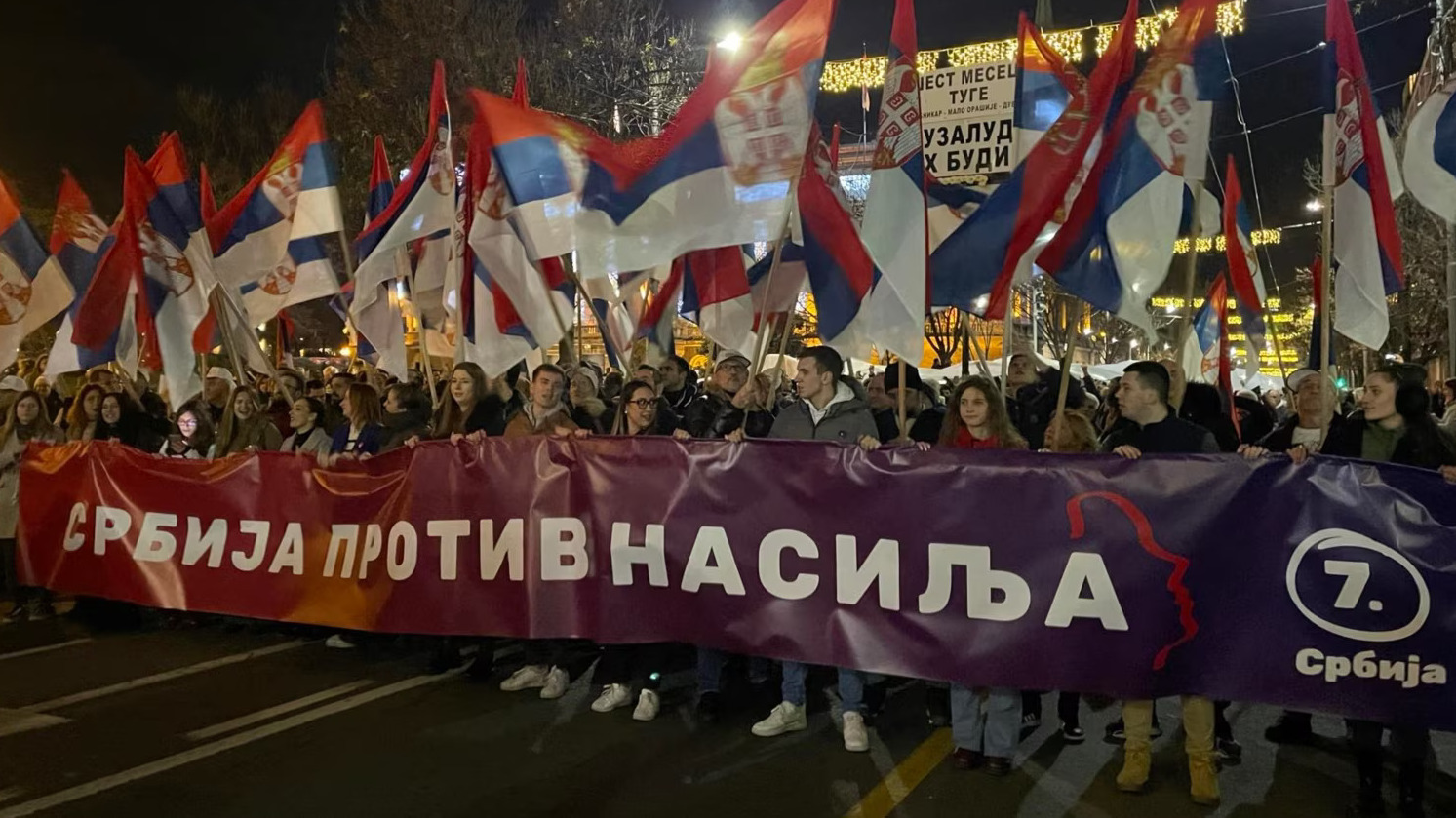
SPN campaigned on increasing pensions, salaries, and investing in education and universal health care

SPN campaigned on returning "stolen pensions" (otete penzije)—the pensions that were lowered by Vučić's government in 2014—and on environmental issues. Ćuta highlighted the issue of poverty and hunger. Lazović also said that SPN supported removing national broadcast frequency status for Happy and Pink television channels, lowering the inflation and prices, and investing in universal health care protection. Aleksić added that SPN would introduce progressive taxation, while Đilas said that SPN would also increase salaries and invest in education. SPN held its last campaign convention on 12 December in Belgrade, which was attended by several thousand supporters.

During the campaign, Miloš Jovanović of NADA intensified his criticism of SNS while declining to criticise pro-European parties. He also called for greater cooperation between opposition parties to remove SNS from power. Jovanović called for electoral reform, pledging to "destroy the partocracy that SNS created" (nakaradna partijska država koju je stvorio SNS). NADA supported the re-introduction of the first-past-the-post system, and campaigned on further regionalisation and decentralisation of Serbia and giving cities and municipalities greater authority over infrastructure and economic matters. NADA also called for the reform of healthcare and agriculture. Vojislav Mihailović of POKS also called for the restoration of the monarchy, saying that "Serbia should be a constitutional, parliamentary monarchy like organised European countries" (da li Srbija treba da bude ustavna, parlamentarna kraljevina poput uređenih evropskih zemalja). Regarding foreign policy, NADA campaigned on strengthening cooperation with the EU in trade, the economy, and culture, but opposed Serbia joining the EU if recognising Kosovo was a condition. NADA held its last campaign convention on 10 December.

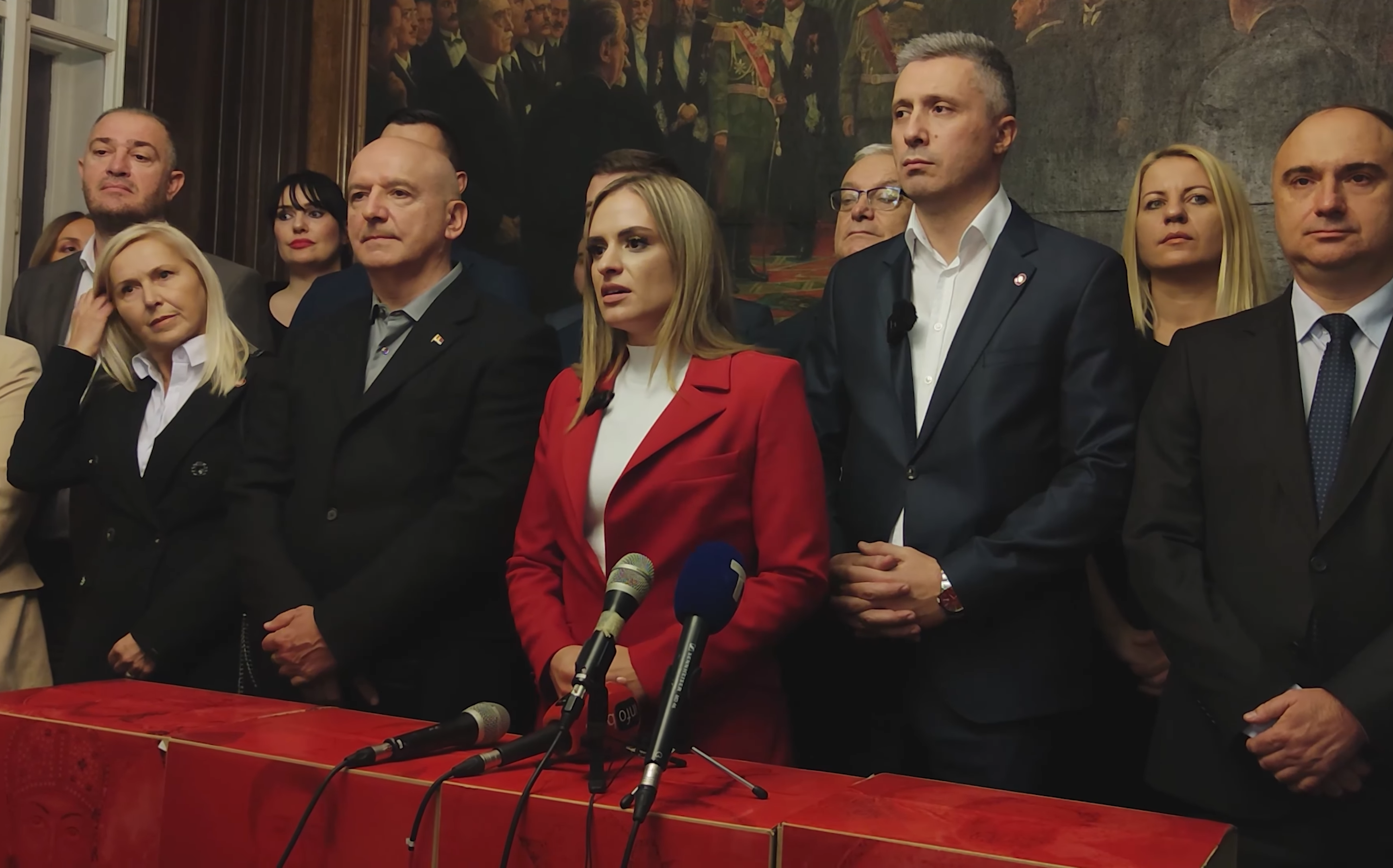
The SSZ–Dveri coalition campaigned on forging closer relations with BRICS, instead of the EU, and opposing the implementation of the Ohrid Agreement

During the campaign, the SSZ–Dveri coalition representatives emphasised their support for greater incentives for domestic businessmen and farmers, the construction of student dormitories in Belgrade, Novi Sad, Niš and Kragujevac, giving free school books, and financial aid for "socially vulnerable families" (socijalno ugrožene porodice). Ratko Ristić, one of the representatives of the NO coalition, also said that one of their main issues is to "return Serbia's sovereignty, especially economic sovereignty" (povratak suverenizma Srbije, posebno ekonomskog) and that they would "pay special attention to the development of Serbian agriculture and the position of Serbian farmers" (posebnu pažnju ćemo obratiti na razvoj srpske poljoprivrede i položaj srpskog seljaka). Đurđević Stamenkovski also said that she wants Serbia to return "the proven traditional values in the education system". Obradović alleged that the SSZ–Dveri coalition was a target of attacks and media censorship. On foreign policy, the coalition supported close relations with China because of its position on Kosovo, and wanted Serbia to join BRICS instead of the EU. Obradović alleged that regions such as Sandžak, Vojvodina, and parts of eastern Serbia would separate from Serbia if "Serbia gives up on Kosovo" (ako se odrekne Kosova). Đurđević Stamenkovski, in an Insajder interview, did not rule out cooperating with SNS after the elections if SNS rejected the Ohrid Agreement. NO held its last campaign convention on 10 December.

== Opinion polls ==
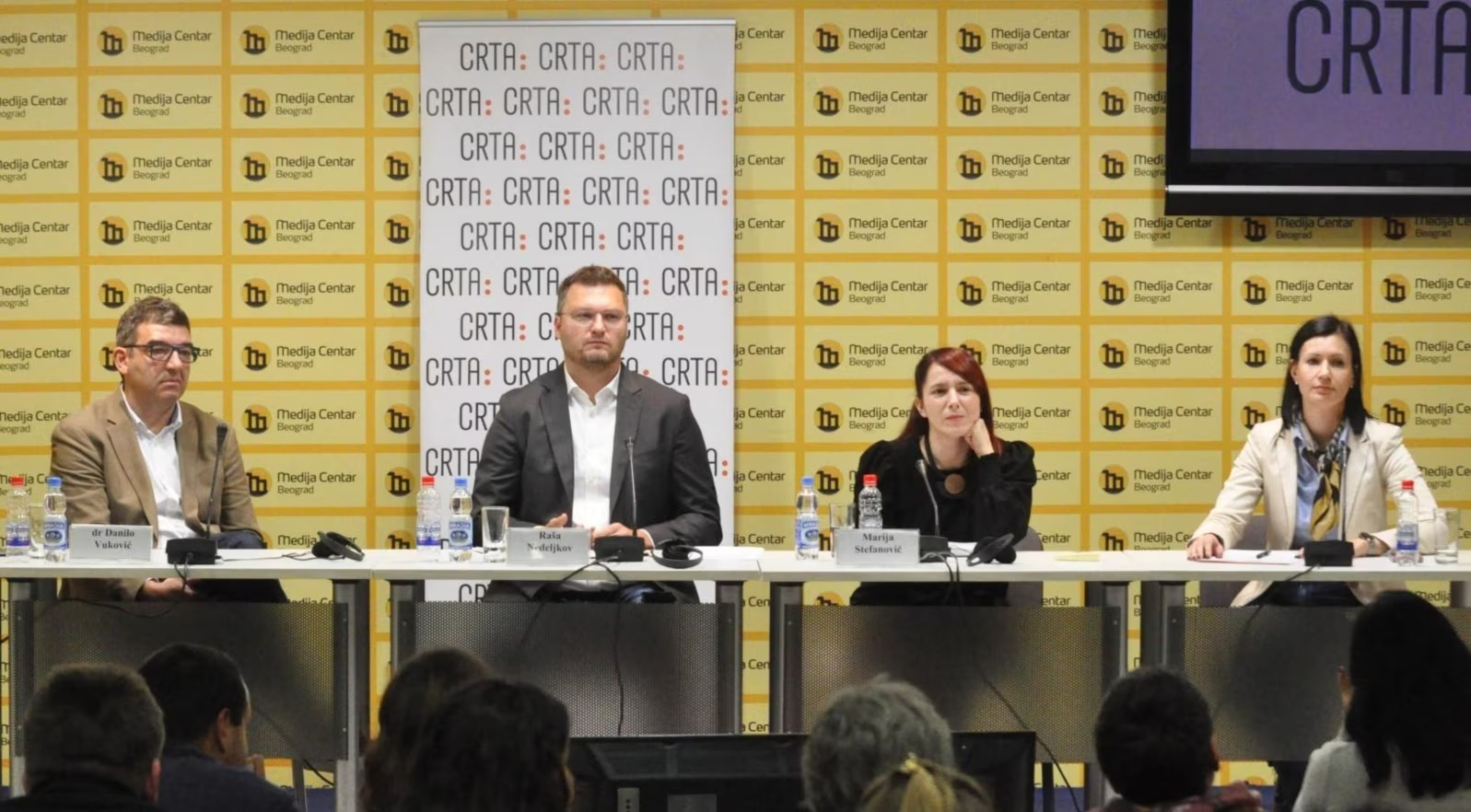
CRTA was one of the non-governmental organisations that conducted opinion polls prior to the election

Opinion polling for the 2023 parliamentary election in Serbia was conducted by various monitoring and research organisations such as Demostat, NSPM, Agency Faktor Plus, Šta Srbija misli?/New Third Way, Stata Agency, and CRTA. Stata Agency has also published scenario polls, featuring a SNS–SPS alliance, the Serbia Against Violence (SPN) coalition, and the "state-building opposition" before the official creation of SPN; Vukadinović of NSPM criticised Stata's scenario polls, saying that the coalition "Serbia Against Violence is, if not exactly a fiction, then, for now, only a projection and, possibly, the desire of some media and political factors. It is difficult to compare something that actually exists with something that could possibly be" (Srbija protiv nasilja ako ne baš fikcija, onda, za sada, samo projekcija i, eventualno, želja nekih medijskih i političkih faktora. Teško je porediti nešto što realno postoji sa nečim što bi, eventualno, tek moglo biti). Anđelković also said that "the public's pulse is very fluid when the elections are still relatively far away" (pulsa javnosti vrlo fluidna kada su izbori još relativno daleko). Besides Stata, CRTA has also published a scenario poll in October 2023.

The Bureau of Social Research (BIRODI) criticised opinion polls for lacking transparency, specifically the omission of key details such as the name of the polling agency, the commissioning party, the sample size, the polling period, and the exact questions asked to respondents, and called on news outlets not to publish such polls. BIRODI stated these organisations "give the opportunity to use opinion polls for propaganda purposes" (daje mogućnost da se istraživanja javnog mnjena koriste u propagandne svrhe) and noted that the elements lead to the "deprofessionalisation of a public opinion researcher" (deprofesionalizacije profesije istraživača javnog mnjenja). Srećko Mihailović of Demostat has also stated that most opinion polls in Serbia are "biased and unprofessional" (pristrasna i neprofesionalna), claiming that "clients are political parties and the government, and researchers manipulate the ratings of parties" (naručioci su političke stranke i vlast, a istraživači manipulišu i sa rejtinzima stranaka) in opinion polls. The World Association for Public Opinion Research, an international professional association of opinion poll researchers, has listed Serbia as a country where there is a denial of the right to public opinion research, stating that "there is pressure from the government, politicians, and some media" (na njih vrši pritisak od strane vlade, političara ali i pojedinih medija).

=== Graphical summary ===
The graph below shows major parties and alliances in opinion polls from the 2022 parliamentary election to 17 December 2023.

Local regression chart of poll results from 3 April 2022 to 17 December 2023

== Conduct ==
According to RIK, 6,500,666 voters were registered for the election, with voting taking place at 8,273 polling stations, including 81 abroad in 35 countries, while 32,216 dual citizens registered to vote abroad. In Canada, Portugal, the United Kingdom, and the United States, voting occurred on 16 December from 07:00 to 20:00. Voting was repeated at 30 polling stations in 19 municipalities on 30 December.

On election day, 17 December, polling stations were open from 07:00 to 20:00. Monitoring organisations such as CeSID and CRTA reported that election day was marked by electoral fraud. By 09:00, CeSID had reported over 50 irregularities, including procedural violations by election committee members and voters photographing or recording their ballots. Kreni-Promeni also reported irregularities, including the use of the "Bulgarian train" vote-rigging method at polling stations in New Belgrade. Nedeljkov of CRTA reported that CRTA observers in Odžaci were physically attacked and their cars damaged; observers there also reported a Bulgarian train. Throughout the rest of the election day, CeSID continued to report more irregularities and intimidation. Parandilović from SPN also published a video in which two Priboj councillor candidates were spotted rigging election ballots.

Voters from Republika Srpska were also driven to the Štark Arena in Belgrade. Although Štark Arena was not a polling station, voters from Republika Srpska confirmed that the Arena was used illegally as a polling station and as a point from which voters were directed to official polling stations in Belgrade. The security at the Štark Arena did not allow members of RIK to enter the building. Brnabić said that she did not see what was irregular or illegal with the Štark Arena serving as a redirect station for voters from Republika Srpska. Miodrag Jovanović, a professor at the Faculty of Law, said, regarding the Arena and the phantom voters (Note: Phantom voters are people registered in the voters list at an address where they do not live, and who therefore cannot legally vote in that municipality or city.) (fantomski glasači), "it is illegal for someone to have a residence where he does not live" (zabranjeno da neko ima prebivalište tamo gde ne živi).

In its report, ODIHR concluded that SNS had a "systematic advantage which created unfair conditions in the elections" (sistematsku prednost koja je stvorila nepravedne uslove) and that Vučić dominated the campaign despite not being a candidate. According to ODIHR, public funds were misused and the media regulator, the Regulatory Body for Electronic Media, was ineffective; although the elections were well organised, they took place in a "socially and politically divided atmosphere". ODIHR described the campaign as polarised and marked by negative campaigning and fearmongering. The Federal Foreign Office of Germany said that abuse of public funds, fearmongering, and vote buying were "unacceptable for a country with the status of a candidate for EU membership".

Stefan Schennach, the chief of the delegation of PACE that monitored the elections, said that "the elections were not fair" and that he had seen "ballots that were printed by a photocopier". In a joint statement, Josep Borrell and Olivér Várhelyi, on behalf of the European Commission, said that Serbia's "electoral process requires tangible improvement and further reform". Political scientist Florian Bieber said that "irregularities appeared to be more widespread than in previous [elections]". Matthew Miller, the spokesperson of the United States Department of State, called for the government of Serbia to investigate the irregularities that occurred. United States senators Jeanne Shaheen and Pete Ricketts also called for the government to "urgently consider whether elections should be repeated in certain regions", saying that the elections were not free and fair. Andreas Schieder, who monitored the elections on behalf of the European Parliament, criticised Brnabić, saying that "the government should work on solving numerous claims about pressure on voters, vote buying, violating voting secrecy, biased media, and the president's involvement in the campaign".

Vučić and SNS denied all of the electoral fraud allegations. Brnabić accused the opposition and CRTA of "destabilising Serbia and its constitutional order" (destabilizuju zemlju i uruše ustavni poredak) and verbally attacked Schennach and Schieder for their criticism of the election conduct.

== Results ==
After the polls closed, CeSID/Ipsos and CRTA were the first to report their projections of the results. According to the 18 December projection from CeSID/Ipsos, the SNS-led list won 46% of the vote and 128 seats, regaining its parliamentary majority, while SPN placed second with 23.6% and 65 seats. The SPS-led list won 6% and 18 seats, its worst result since the 2007 parliamentary election, while NADA won 4.9%. Unexpectedly, Nestorović's MI–GIN also crossed the threshold, winning 13 seats. Of the minority lists, VMSZ was projected to win 6 seats, SPP–DSHV 3, SDAS 2, and the Albanian list and the Russian Party one each. The NO coalition of Dveri and SSZ failed to cross the threshold, winning only 2.8% of the vote. SNS received the most votes abroad.

RIK broadcast the results live, updating them every five minutes. RIK published the final results on 12 January. After the overall election report was published, RIK allocated the National Assembly seats to the candidates within ten days.

Electoral list	Votes	%	+/–	Seats	+/–
Serbia Must Not Stop	1,783,701	48.07	+3.8	129	+9
Serbia Against Violence	902,450	24.32	+5.39	65	+25
SPS–JS–Zeleni	249,916	6.73	–5.06	18	–13
National Democratic Alternative	191,431	5.16	–0.38	13	–1
We – Voice from the People	178,830	4.82	New	13	New
National Gathering	105,165	2.83	–4.91	0	–16
Alliance of Vojvodina Hungarians	64,747	1.74	+0.11	6	+1
Serbian Radical Party	55,782	1.50	–0.72	0	0
Good Morning Serbia	45,079	1.21	–3.69	0	0
People's Party	33,388	0.90	New	0	–12
SPP–DSHV	29,066	0.78	–0.84	2	–3
Party of Democratic Action of Sandžak	21,827	0.59	+0.03	2	0
Political Struggle of the Albanians Continues	13,501	0.36	+0.08	1	0
RS–NKPJ	11,369	0.31	New	1	New
It Must Be Different	9,243	0.25	New	0	New
Coalition for Peace and Tolerance	6,786	0.18	New	0	–1
Nova–D2SP–GDF–Libdem–Glas	5,462	0.15	New	0	0
Albanian Democratic Alternative	3,235	0.09	0	0	0
Total	3,710,978	100.00	–	250	0
Valid votes	3,710,978	97.27			
Invalid/blank votes	104,029	2.73			
Total votes	3,815,007	100.00			
Registered voters/turnout	6,500,666	58.77			
Source: Republic Bureau of Statistics

== Reactions ==
SNS declared victory after the polls closed. SNS was congratulated by Dačić and Milorad Dodik, the president of Republika Srpska, and Katalin Novák, the president of Hungary. Vučić alleged that "an important country intervened in the election process of Serbia in the most brutal way" (jedne važne zemlje u izborni proces Srbije na najbrutalniji način).

Nestorović of MI–GIN said that "even though no one gave us a chance, we became one of the four or five strongest parties" (iako im niko nije davao šanse, ušli u krug četiri, pet najjačih partija); he rejected cooperating with SNS or SPN after the elections. Danas newspaper described Nestorović as "the biggest surprise" (najveće iznenađenje) of the 2023 elections. At an SPS press conference, Dačić expressed dissatisfaction with the result. Pásztor said that VMSZ "achieved the election result that we wanted" (rezultat kakav smo želeli) and that it was ready to join the next SNS-led government.

Miloš Bešić, a professor at the Faculty of Political Sciences, said that the society in Serbia "is even more divided after the elections" (društvo podeljenije nego pre izbora) and argued that "the failure of right-wing parties is one of the main impressions of the voting results" (neuspeh desnice jedan od glavnih utisaka rezultata glasanja). Bešić also said that SNS's attacks on SPS during the campaign were reflected in the results, with SPS losing support and SNS gaining it, but noted that SNS and SPS combined won fewer votes than in 2022.

== Aftermath ==
Due to their failure to secure parliamentary representation, Obradović of Dveri and all members of the presidency of Narodna, including president Jeremić, resigned from their positions.

=== Protests ===
Following the elections on 17 December, SPN began organising protests outside the RIK building. At the 18 December protest, Aleksić and Tepić announced that they would go on a hunger strike until the results of the Belgrade City Assembly election were annulled. SPN expanded its demands on 20 December by demanding the annulment of all 17 December election results. Alongside SPN, NADA, Narodna, SDS, and Dveri also expressed their support for the annulment of 17 December election results and the scheduling of new elections. On 21 December, members of the National Assembly Jelena Milošević and Danijela Grujić joined Aleksić and Tepić in their hunger strike. A day later, Janko Veselinović and Željko Veselinović joined the hunger strike, followed on 23 December by MPs-elect Branko Miljuš and Dušan Nikezić.

After an attempt by politicians to enter the City Assembly of Belgrade, a riot broke out and 38 demonstrators were arrested. Protests continued up to 30 December, at which point the hunger strike ended. The protests were strongly criticised by the government, with Brnabić and Aleksandar Šapić, the then-mayor of Belgrade, comparing the protests to Euromaidan. Russia also alleged that Western powers were involved in the protests.

=== Government formation ===
On several occasions, Dačić expressed his support for continuing to work with SNS after the 2023 election. In October, Dačić had said: "I am convinced that we will continue cooperation even after the victory in the December elections, in the interest of Serbia, and a better future for all the citizens of our country, as well as the Serbian people as a whole" (Uveren sam da ćemo takvu saradnju nastaviti i posle pobede na decembarskim izborima, u interesu Srbije i bolje budućnosti svih građana naše zemlje, kao i srpskog naroda u celini). In a November interview with Insajder, Dačić said that the goal of SPS is "to win a parliamentary majority, together with SNS, because we alone cannot have a majority" (Naš politički cilj je da osvojimo većinu, zajedno sa SNS-om, jer mi sami ne možemo da imamo većinu) and that "the best solution for Serbia is [...] that Vučić should be president [...] and Dačić should be prime minister" (najbolje rešenje za Srbiju [...] Vučić da bude predsednik [...] [i] Dačić premijer). Regarding a government with SNS, Dačić later said that "[SPS] wants [to be in the government], but if they do not want us, then there is no problem" (Mi hoćemo, ako oni ne žele, nikakav problem nije); he also criticised opposition parties and described them as "a big fraud called DOS" (velika prevara koju on naziva DOS-om). Other SPS politicians, like Paunović and Toma Fila, expressed their support for continuing to work with SNS after the elections.

Although SRS ran with SNS in the Belgrade City Assembly election, Vučić said that the next government would not include SRS because of policy disagreements, citing the EU as an example. Vučić also expressed doubts in SPS during the campaign period, while Brnabić criticised SPS officials such as Ružić, her former cabinet minister. Vučević also said that "there are no guarantees that SPS will not switch sides" (nemamo garancije da SPS neće promeniti stranu). Dušan Spasojević, a Faculty of Political Sciences professor, said that the "attacks on SPS are aimed to win back part of the voters who voted for the Socialists in the last elections, and perhaps to take over part of their voting base" (Napadi na SPS imaju za cilj da povrate deo birača koji je na prošlim izborima glasao za socijaliste, a možda i da preuzmu deo njihove baze). Popović of the Centre for Practical Politics argued the same.

The constitutive session of the 14th National Assembly of Serbia took place on 6 February 2024. Brnabić was elected president of the National Assembly in March 2024. After several months of negotiations, Vučević was given the mandate to form a government, which was elected on 2 May 2024. Besides SNS and SPS, his cabinet included Đurđević Stamenkovski, whose SSZ had failed to win representation in the National Assembly.

=== Jadar lithium project ===
The Economist Intelligence Unit (EIU) and Danas reported in early December 2023 that on 22 September, Vučić had signed an agreement with the European Commission on the production of lithium batteries in Serbia. The government had cancelled the Rio Tinto lithium mine project in January 2022, amidst the environmental protests, but the EIU reported that in the September 2023 agreement "the government [of Serbia] has not given up on a plan to allow the mining of lithium at Jadar". The agreement also included the construction of a factory in Ćuprija. EIU stated that due to the 2023 parliamentary election, "the government is likely to stall the plans, reviving them only once the December election is over". In June 2024, the Financial Times reported that Serbia would "give green light to Rio Tinto" and its Jadar project. The Neue Zürcher Zeitung reported the same. In July 2024, the government revived the Jadar project, which resulted in a series of environmental protests.
