= Bojan Torbica =

Serbian politician

Bojan Torbica (Serbian Cyrillic: Бојан Торбица; born 25 July 1974) is a Serbian politician who is the president of the Movement of Socialists. He has served in the National Assembly of Serbia since 2016.

== Early life and career ==
Torbica was born in Novi Sad, Vojvodina, in what was then the Socialist Republic of Serbia in the Socialist Federal Republic of Yugoslavia. He has a Bachelor of Laws degree from the University of Novi Sad. Torbica moved to Temerin in 2002 to work as director of Radio Temerin and subsequently became the director of the Lukijan Mušicki cultural centre. He now lives in Bački Jarak in Temerin.

== Politician ==
=== Municipal politics ===
The Movement of Socialists has been aligned with the Serbian Progressive Party since 2010, and the parties ran a combined electoral list for the Temerin municipal assembly in the 2012 Serbian local elections. Torbica received the fourth position on the list and was elected when the list won five mandates. He served as a member of the municipal assembly until January 2013, when he was appointed as one of Novi Sad's four deputy mayors, with responsibility for the economy. He remained in the latter office until his election to parliament in 2016.

He received the ninth position on the Progressive-led list for Temerin in the 2020 local elections and was re-elected when the list won eighteen mandates. He is now the leader of the PS group in the municipal assembly.

=== Provincial politics ===
Torbica has been the leader of the Vojvodina provincial branch of Movement of Socialists.

=== Parliamentarian ===
The Movement of Socialists contested the 2016 Serbian parliamentary election as part of the Progressive Party's Aleksandar Vučić – Serbia Is Winning list. Torbica received the forty-seventh position and was elected when the list won a landslide victory with 131 out of 250 mandates. During the 2016–20 parliament, the Movement of Socialists served in a parliamentary group with the People's Peasant Party and the United Peasant Party. Torbica was a member of the assembly committee on constitutional and legislative issues and the committee on labour, social issues, social inclusion, and poverty reduction; a deputy member of the culture and information committee and the European integration committee; and a member of the parliamentary friendship groups with Argentina, Armenia, Belarus, Brazil, China, Cuba, Egypt, France, Germany, India, Indonesia, Italy, Russia, Spain, the countries of Sub-Saharan Africa, the United Arab Emirates, the United Kingdom, the United States of America, and Venezuela.

He was physically attacked by unknown assailants in Kosovska Mitrovica in January 2017. He later said that the attack was politically motivated and that he had been targeted for his support of Prime Minister Vučić's administration.

Torbica again received the forty-seventh position on the Progressive Party's coalition list in the 2020 Serbian parliamentary election. The list won a landslide victory with 188 mandates, and he was elected to a second term. He is now a member of the communication on spatial planning, transport, infrastructure, and telecommunications; a deputy member of the defence and internal affairs committee and the culture and information committee; the leader of Serbia's parliamentary friendship group with Croatia; and a member of the parliamentary friendship groups with Algeria, Angola, Argentina, Armenia, Australia, Azerbaijan, Belarus, Bhutan, Brazil, Burundi, Cambodia, Canada, Chile, China, Cuba, the Czech Republic, the Democratic Republic of the Congo, Djibouti, Egypt, Ethiopia, Fiji, France, Georgia, Germany, Ghana, Greece, the Holy See, India, Indonesia, Iran, Iraq, Israel, Italy, Japan, Jordan, Kazakhstan, Kenya, Kuwait, Lesotho, Malawi, Mexico, Moldova, Montenegro, Morocco, Myanmar, Namibia, Nepal, North Korea, North Macedonia, Norway, Oman, the Philippines, Portugal, Qatar, Rwanda, Russia, Saudi Arabia, Sierra Leone, South Africa, the Sovereign Order of Malta, Spain, the countries of Sub-Saharan Africa, Sweden, Switzerland, Syria, Tajikistan, Tunisia, Turkey, Turkmenistan, Uganda, Ukraine, the United Arab Emirates, the United Kingdom, the United States of America, Venezuela, Vietnam, Zambia, and Zimbabwe.
