= Shqiprim Arifi =

Serbian politician of Albanian ethnicity (born 1976)

- Шћиприм Арифи
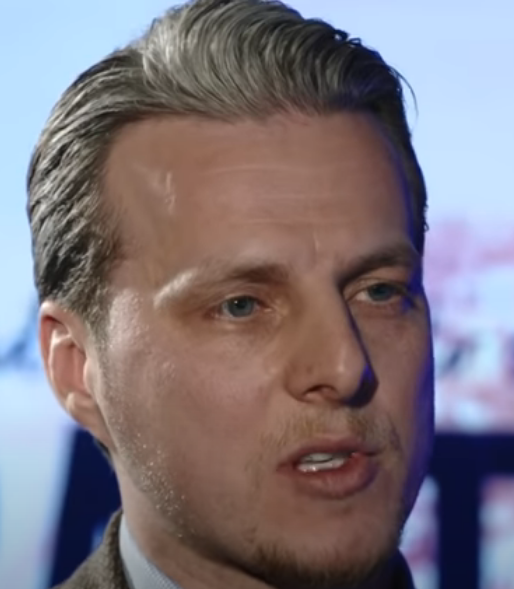
- Shqiprim Arifi, 2020

Mayor of Preševo
- In office 11 April 2022 – 20 April 2024
- Preceded by: Ardita Sinani
- Succeeded by: Ragmi Mustafa
- In office 15 September 2017 – 12 May 2021
- Preceded by: Ardita Sinani
- Succeeded by: Ardita Sinani
- In office 27 May 2016 – 13 March 2017
- Preceded by: Ragmi Mustafa
- Succeeded by: Ardita Sinani

Personal details
- Born: 14 June 1976 (age 50) Mannheim, West Germany
- Citizenship: Serbian; German
- Party: Alternative for Changes
- Occupation: Politician; businessman

Shqiprim Arifi (Serbian Cyrillic: Шћиприм Арифи, romanized: Šćiprim Arifi; born 14 June 1976) is a Serbian politician of Albanian ethnicity who served as the head of the Alternative for Changes and served as mayor of Preševo in three separate stints from 2016 to 2024. Arifi is one of the representatives of the country's Albanian community.

== Biography ==
Arifi was born on 14 June 1976 to an Albanian family in Mannheim, West Germany. His family hails from the village of Trnava, in the vicinity of Preševo. In Germany he attended elementary school and graduated from economics high school in 1998.

After graduating, he started working for HAAF as an international sector manager, and in 2002 he started a private business in the field of logistics, while soon opening branches of his company in Stuttgart, Leipzig, Hamburg, Bratislava and Kumanovo.

He moved from Germany to Preševo in 2013.

After the 2016 Serbian local elections, he was elected president of the municipality of Preševo, while he was re-elected in February 2018. In 2016, Arifi became the president of one of the local governments in Serbia, although he did not speak Serbian.

He advocates the annexation of the Preševo Valley to Kosovo.

== Personal life ==
Arifi is married and has three daughters. Arifi's younger brother, Shpejtim (born 3 May 1979) is a football manager and former player.
