= Russian Party (Serbia) =

Political party in Serbia

Russian Party Руска странка Ruska stranka Русская партия
- Abbreviation: RS
- Leader: Slobodan Nikolić
- Founded: 9 June 2013
- Split from: People's Peasant Party
- Headquarters: Cerska 17/4, Šabac
- Ideology: Russian minority interests; Serbian nationalism; Social conservatism; Russophilia
- National affiliation: NKPJ (2023–)
- Colours: Blue
- Slogan: "Srbija ka istoku" ("Serbia to the East")
- National Assembly: 0 / 250
- Assembly of Vojvodina: 0 / 120
- City Assembly of Belgrade: 1 / 110

Website
- www.ruskastranka.rs

The Russian Party (Serbian: Руска странка, РС / Ruska stranka, RS; Russian: Русская партия, РП, romanized: Russkaya partiya, RP) is a political party in Serbia that claims to represent the Russian ethnic minority. The party gathers a number of pro-Russian citizens, mostly Serbs. The party's president is Slobodan Nikolić, a former vice-president of the People's Peasant Party. The party competed in the 2023 and 2026 parliamentary election in alliance with the New Communist Party of Yugoslavia.

== Programme ==
According to its programme, the Russian Party advocates Serbia's entry into the Eurasian Economic Union, and the full membership of Serbia in the Collective Security Treaty Organization. The party also advocates increasing cooperation with the Russian Federation in the field of economy, culture and education.

== Criticism and electoral controversies ==
The party has faced accusations of being a satellite organisation of the Serbian Progressive Party (SNS) that exploits minority party electoral advantages. Legal expert Sofija Mandić described the party's participation as a "satellite" of the ruling party, suggesting that "these are votes from Serbian Progressive Party, which in this way tries to create another 'reserve player' for itself." Mandić characterised the party as "a political group that does not exist in real political life, appearing only when elections come." Minority parties in Serbia benefit from lower electoral thresholds, needing only to pass the "natural threshold" rather than the standard 3% census required for majority parties.

In the June 2024 Niš local elections, the party won a single mandate with 1,224 votes in a city where only 121 residents identified as ethnically Russian in the 2022 census. This mandate proved decisive, as both the SNS and the opposition lists had won exactly 30 seats, which is one short of a majority. The party's representative, Tihomir Perić, subsequently formed a coalition with SNS, stating "I'm not Russian, I'm a Russophile." Of the eight candidates on the Niš list, only one had a Russian name.

== Electoral performance ==
=== Parliamentary elections ===
National Assembly of Serbia
Year	Leader	Popular vote	% of popular vote	#	# of seats	Seat change	Coalition	Status	Ref.
2014	Slobodan Nikolić	6,547	0.19%	▲15th	0 / 250	0	–	Extra-parliamentary	
2016	Slobodan Nikolić	13,777	0.38%	▼16th	0 / 250	0	–	Extra-parliamentary	
2020	Slobodan Nikolić	6,295	0.20%	▼21st	0 / 250	0	–	Extra-parliamentary	
2022	Slobodan Nikolić	Did not participate			0 / 250	0	–	Extra-parliamentary	–
2023	Slobodan Nikolić	11,369	0.31%	▲14th	1 / 250	▲1	RS–NKPJ	Support	
2026	Slobodan Nikolić	6,503	0.15%	▲12th	0 / 250	▼1	RS–NKPJ	Extra-parliamentary	

=== Presidential elections ===
Year	Candidate	1st round popular vote		% of popular vote	2nd round popular vote		% of popular vote
2017	Did not participate	—	—	—	—	—	—
2022	Did not participate	—	—	—	—	—	—
