= Slobodan Nikolić (politician) =

Serbian politician

- Слободан Николић
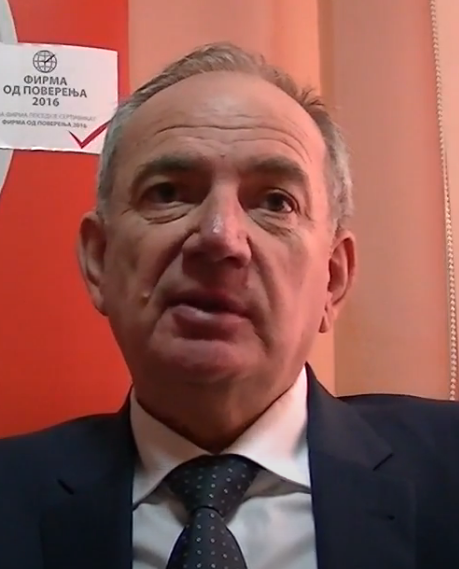

Member of the National Assembly
- Incumbent
- Assumed office 6 February 2024

Personal details
- Born: 27 March 1957 (age 69) Šabac, PR Serbia, FPR Yugoslavia
- Party: NSS (until 2013); RP (2013–present)

Slobodan Nikolić (Serbian Cyrillic: Слободан Николић; Russian: Слободан Николич, born 27 March 1957) is a Serbian politician who has been a member of the National Assembly since 6 February 2024. A former vice-president of the People's Peasant Party (NSS), he is now the president of the Russian Party (RP), which advocates for the interests of the Russian minority in Serbia, as well as for the closer cooperation with the Russian Federation.

== Biography ==
He was born on 27 March 1957 in Šabac. From 1983 to 1984, he worked in the National Statistical Office, and from 1984 to 1996, he worked as a commercialist in the MPI "Žitoratar" Šabac. From 1996 to 2001 he had his own private business. From 2001 to 2005, he was a Director of the Association "Village Threshold 98". The association deals with the revitalisation and demographic problems of the villages, and the establishment of cooperation with the Russian Federation. In 1998, official cooperation was established with the Ivanovo region in Russia and a protocol on cooperation with the Cultural Fund was signed. From 2005 to 2006 he was the director of "Zorka plant protection". Since 2010, he has been the president of the Serbian-Russian Friendship Association "Vladimir Putin" in Šabac and continues the already well-established cooperation with the Russian Federation.

On 26 December 2011, the city of Šabac received the Order of "Yermak" from the Presidium of the Council for Social Recognitions of the Russian Federation, and he received the Order of Tsar Nikolai II Romanov. He also won the Medal of the City of Moscow in 2011.

== Political career ==
From 2006 to 2015, Nikolić was a member of the City Council of Šabac in charge of cooperation with citizens' associations and cooperation with the Russian Federation.

He served as the vice-president of the People's Peasant Party (NSS) until 2013, when he founded the Russian Party (RP) with the goal of establishing even closer connections of Serbia and the Russian Federation. The party advocates Serbia's entry into the Eurasian Economic Union, and the full membership of Serbia in the Collective Security Treaty Organization. The party also advocates increasing cooperation with the Russian Federation in the field of economy, culture and education.

=== Member of the National Assembly ===
Nikolić was elected to the National Assembly following the 2023 parliamentary election and was sworn in as MP on 6 February 2024. He is a member of the Serbian delegation in the Parliamentary Assembly of the Collective Security Treaty Organization. In a meeting with President Aleksandar Vučić, Nikolić voiced his opposition to sanctioning Russia due to its invasion of Ukraine.

== Personal life ==
He is married and is a father of three children. Besides his native Serbian, he speaks Russian.
