= Movement of Socialists =

Political party in Serbia

Movement of Socialists Покрет социјалиста Pokret socijalista
- Abbreviation: PS
- President: Bojan Torbica (Note: Torbica became the party's leader in December 2022, when Vulin resigned on being appointed director of the Security Intelligence Agency. Since 2025, Vulin has again been described in the media as the leader or president of PS and has chaired sessions of its presidency, but the Register of Political Parties continues to list Torbica as its legal representative.)
- Founder: Aleksandar Vulin
- Founded: 8 August 2008; 18 years ago
- Split from: Socialist Party of Serbia
- Headquarters: Bulevar Milutina Milankovića 120B, Belgrade
- Ideology: Left-wing nationalism; Social democracy; Social conservatism; Serbian irredentism
- Political position: Centre-left
- International affiliation: Sovintern
- Colours: Red; Yellow
- National Assembly: 0 / 250
- Assembly of Vojvodina: 2 / 120
- City Assembly of Belgrade: 1 / 110

Party flag
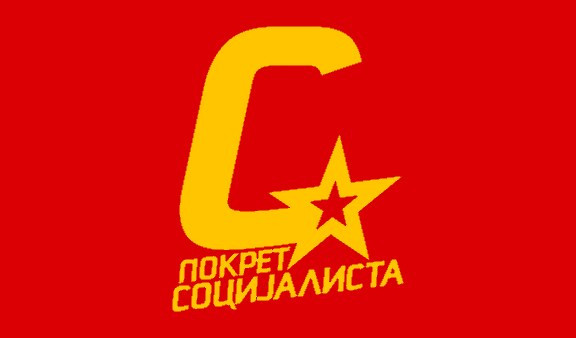

Website
- pokretsocijalista.rs

The Movement of Socialists (Serbian: Покрет социјалиста, romanised: Pokret socijalista, abbr. PS) is a left-wing nationalist political party in Serbia. It was founded in 2008 by Aleksandar Vulin, who led it until 2022, when he was succeeded by Bojan Torbica.

PS ran on the electoral lists led by the Serbian Progressive Party (SNS) in every parliamentary election from 2012 to 2023, and Vulin held ministerial posts in most SNS-led governments. It did not take part in the 2026 parliamentary election, in which it called on its supporters to vote for the SNS-led list, and it has had no seats in the National Assembly since.

== History ==
It was founded on 8 August 2008 by Aleksandar Vulin, a former high-ranking member of Yugoslav Left who left it in 1998 after perceiving the party to have "betrayed its programme and became a political mask for the wealthy sitting in the party". It was formed by former members of the Socialist Party of Serbia because they disagreed with the pro-European policy of the party; however, it took part in the pro-European SNS-led coalitions in the 2012 (as part of the Let's Get Serbia Moving alliance) and 2014 parliamentary elections, and remained part of the SNS-led coalitions until 2026. In December 2022, Vulin resigned as the leader of PS after being appointed as the director of the Security Intelligence Agency.

On 11 July 2023, the United States Department of the Treasury imposed sanctions on Vulin, accusing him of corruption, involvement in transnational organised crime and illegal narcotics operations, and of facilitating Russian "malign activities" in Serbia. PS again ran on the SNS-led list in the 2023 parliamentary election, winning two seats. In the 14th National Assembly, its MPs sat in a joint parliamentary group with Healthy Serbia. Vulin served as a deputy prime minister without portfolio in the cabinet of Miloš Vučević from May 2024, but was not included in the cabinet of Đuro Macut formed in April 2025, the first time since 2013, apart from his year as director of the Security Intelligence Agency, that he was not a member of the government; Vulin attributed this to pressure from the European Union and the West. In April 2026, PS was one of the co-founders of Sovintern, a network of left-wing parties launched in Moscow by A Just Russia.

Ahead of the 2026 snap parliamentary election, PS held talks with We – Power of the People (MI–SN) on a joint list, but withdrew after the talks caused a split within MI–SN, saying it did not want to be "the reason for a split in their ranks". It said that it had not joined the SNS-led list, and that it could not support the Student List, because of its support for an alliance with Russia and China and its opposition to EU and NATO integration. PS did not field a list, and on 5 October Vulin called on its members to vote for "Aleksandar Vučić – United Serbia", while announcing that he would run in the presidential election due in December.

== Ideology and platform ==
It is a self-described radical left or leftist political party. Observers have described it as a centre-left, social-democratic, and left-wing nationalist party. Its foreign policy views are Eurosceptic and anti-Western. PS is supportive of further cooperation with China and Russia; in 2026, it described itself as a "nationally responsible left" advocating an alliance with Russia and China and opposing EU and NATO integration.

It was created as a party vehicle for Vulin, who has been described as a nationalist, and has expressed irredentist views. In 2022, PS proclaimed the "Serbian world" idea as its primary political idea and goal. It has been also described as a satellite party of the ruling Serbian Progressive Party.

In an opinion article, Miloš Baković Jadžić, now-leader of the Political Platform Solidarity and member of the party Together, criticised PS by describing it as a conservative and neoliberal party "with nothing in common with progressive left-wing politics but its name, symbolism, occasional rhetoric and a somewhat radical programme," having engaged in active anti-worker and anti-progressive politics. Sociologist Jovo Bakić has also disputed the leftism of PS due to "their support for the nationalistic and neoliberal policies". Political theorist Srećko Horvat noted PS' participation in the governing coalition's "harsh neoliberal measures, including pension cuts, public sector wage cuts, deregulation and labour market flexibilization" and minister Vulin's direct responsibility for "one of the worst new labour laws" that had been passed in Serbia in 2014. He further discredited the party as having nothing to do with socialism or left-wing politics.

In 2015, Vulin said that he was opposed to same-sex marriage and that, as minister for social policy, he would never sign a law making it possible.

== Organisation ==
Its headquarters are at Bulevar Milutina Milankovića 120B in Belgrade. The party was entered in the Register of Political Parties with 17 July 2008 as its founding date.

=== List of presidents ===
#	President	Born–Death	Term start	Term end
1	Aleksandar Vulin	1972–	7 August 2008	5 December 2022
2	Bojan Torbica	1974–	5 December 2022	Incumbent

== Electoral performance ==
=== Parliamentary elections ===
National Assembly of Serbia
Year	Leader	Popular vote	% of popular vote	#	# of seats	Seat change	Coalition	Status
2012	Aleksandar Vulin	940,659	25.16%	1st	1 / 250	▲1	PS	Government
2014	Aleksandar Vulin	1,736,920	49.96%	1st	3 / 250	▲2	AV–BKV	Government
2016	Aleksandar Vulin	1,823,147	49.71%	1st	3 / 250	0	AV–SP	Government
2020	Aleksandar Vulin	1,953,998	63.02%	1st	3 / 250	0	AV–ZND	Government
2022	Aleksandar Vulin	1,635,101	44.27%	1st	2 / 250	▼1	AV–ZMS	Support
2023	Bojan Torbica	1,783,701	48.07%	1st	2 / 250	0	AV–SNSDS	Government
2026	Bojan Torbica	Did not participate			0 / 250	▼2	Supported AV–US	Extra-parliamentary

=== Presidential elections ===
President of Serbia
Year	Candidate	1st round popular vote		% of popular vote	2nd round popular vote		% of popular vote	Notes	Ref.
2012	Tomislav Nikolić	2nd	979,216	26.22%	1st	1,552,063	51.16%	Supported Nikolić	
2017	Aleksandar Vučić	1st	2,012,788	56.01%	—N/a	—	—	Supported Vučić	
2022	Aleksandar Vučić	1st	2,224,914	60.01%	—N/a	—	—	Supported Vučić	
