= Alternative for Changes =

Political party in Serbia

Alternative for Changes Alternativa për ndryshimа Алтернатива за промене Alternativa za promene
- Abbreviation: APN/AZP
- President: Shqiprim Arifi
- Founded: 2015
- Headquarters: Seljami Halači bb, Preševo
- Ideology: Albanian minority interests
- Colours: Blue
- National Assembly: 1 / 250

Website
- ndryshimi.com

Alternative for Changes (Albanian: Alternativa për ndryshim, abbr. APN; Serbian: Алтернатива за промене, romanised: Alternativa za promene, abbr. AZP) is a political party in Serbia, representing the Albanian ethnic minority in Preševo Valley. It was founded in 2015, and it is currently led by Shqiprim Arifi, the president of the Preševo municipality.

== Electoral performance ==
=== Parliamentary elections ===
National Assembly of Serbia
Year	Leader	Popular vote	% of popular vote	#	# of seats	Seat change	Coalition	Status	Ref.
2020	Shqiprim Arifi	26,437	0.85%	▲14th	1 / 250	▲1	ADA	Opposition	
2022	Shqiprim Arifi	3,265	0.09%	▼19th	0 / 250	▼1	–	Extra-parliamentary	
2023	Shqiprim Arifi	3,235	0.09%	▲18th	0 / 250	0	–	Extra-parliamentary	
2026	Visar Mehmeti	27,683	0.63%	▲6th	1 / 250	▲1	KAPD	TBA	
