= 13th National Assembly of Serbia =

National Assembly of Serbia from 2022 to 2024

Thirteenth convocation of the National Assembly of the Republic of Serbia
←	12th National Assembly	14th National Assembly	→
- Seat composition of the 13th National Assembly

Overview
- Legislative body: National Assembly of Serbia
- Jurisdiction: Serbia
- Meeting place: House of the National Assembly, 13 Nikola Pašić Square, Belgrade
- Term: 1 August 2022 – 6 February 2024
- Election: 3 April 2022
- Government: Third cabinet of Ana Brnabić
- Website: parlament.gov.rs
- Members: 250
- President: Vladimir Orlić (SNS)
- Vice Presidents: Sandra Božić (SNS); Snežana Paunović (SPS); Borko Stefanović (SSP); Zoran Lutovac (DS); Elvira Kovač (VMSZ); Usame Zukorlić (SPP)
- Party control: ZMS–SPS group majority

The thirteenth convocation of the National Assembly of the Republic of Serbia (Serbian: Тринаести сазив Народне скупштине Републике Србије, romanized: Trinaesti saziv Narodne skupštine Republike Srbije) was the convocation of the National Assembly of Serbia from 2022 to 2024, elected in the 2022 general election.

== Leadership ==
At the first session of the National Assembly of the 13th convocation on 2 August 2022, Vladimir Orlić, a member of the Serbian Progressive Party (SNS), was elected chairman. Out of the 230 present, 154 MPs supported Orlić's candidacy, while 76 were against.

Seven vice-presidents of the assembly were also elected: Sandra Božić (SNS), Snežana Paunović (SPS), Borko Stefanović (SSP), Zoran Lutovac (DS), Božidar Delić (NN-IJS), Elvira Kovač (VMSZ) and Usame Zukorlić (SPP). Vice Chairman Božidar Delić died a few weeks after being elected.

== Current composition ==
Name	Political party	Parliamentary group	Year of birth	Residence	Notes
Dragoljub Acković	SNS	Together We Can Do Everything	1952	Belgrade	
Stefan Adžić	SNS	Together We Can Do Everything	1996	Kraljevo	
Ivan Antić	SNS	Together We Can Do Everything	1978	Novi Sad	
Veroljub Arsić	SNS	Together We Can Do Everything	1969	Požarevac	
Marko Atlagić	SNS	Together We Can Do Everything	1949	Belgrade	
Živan Bajić	SNS	Together We Can Do Everything	1982	Šabac	
Nebojša Bakarec	SNS	Together We Can Do Everything	1963	Belgrade	
Igor Bečić	SNS	Together We Can Do Everything	1971	Novi Sad	
Ana Beloica Martać	SNS	Together We Can Do Everything	1992	Raška	
Marko Bogdanović	PSS–BK	Together We Can Do Everything	1981	Belgrade	
Milorad Bajović	SNS	Together We Can Do Everything	1973	Novi Sad	
Nikola Bokan	SNS	Together We Can Do Everything	1999	Novi Sad	
Sandra Božić	SNS	Together We Can Do Everything	1979	Pančevo	Vice President of the National Assembly
Žika Bujuklić	SNS	Together We Can Do Everything	1952	Belgrade	
Slaviša Bulatović	SNS	Together We Can Do Everything	1975	Vranje, Vranjska Banja	
Aleksandar Čotrić	SPO	Together We Can Do Everything	1966	Belgrade	
Tijana Davidovac	SNS	Together We Can Do Everything	1986	Lazarevac	
Zoran Dragišić	SNS	Together We Can Do Everything	1967	Belgrade	
Milovan Drecun	SNS	Together We Can Do Everything	1957	Belgrade	
Vladimir Đukanović	SNS	Together We Can Do Everything	1979	Belgrade	
Nevena Đurić	SNS	Together We Can Do Everything	1993	Kruševac	
Ninoslav Erić	SNS	Together We Can Do Everything	1976	Ćuprija	
Dubravka Filipovski	SNS	Together We Can Do Everything	1967	Belgrade	
Danica Grujičić	SNS	Together We Can Do Everything	1959	Belgrade	
Dejan Ilić	SNS	Together We Can Do Everything	1957	Smederevska Palanka - Selevac	
Biljana Ilić Stošić	SNS	Together We Can Do Everything	1964	Kragujevac	
Nataša Ivanović	SNS	Together We Can Do Everything	1978	Petrovac na Mlavi	
Lepomir Ivković	SNS	Together We Can Do Everything	1959	Belgrade	
Tomislav Janković	SNS	Together We Can Do Everything	1973	Sremska Mitrovica, Mačvanska Mitrovica	
Stanislava Janošević	SNS	Together We Can Do Everything	1986	Zrenjanin	
Krsto Janjušević	SNS	Together We Can Do Everything	1981	Priboj	
Nemanja Joksimović	SNS	Together We Can Do Everything	1990	Belgrade	
Milenko Jovanov	SNS	Together We Can Do Everything	1980	Kikinda	
Darko Jovanović	SNS	Together We Can Do Everything	1977	Belgrade	
Dragan Jovanović	BS	Together We Can Do Everything	1972	Topola - Blaznava	
Jadranka Jovanović	SNS	Together We Can Do Everything	1958	Belgrade	
Marija Jovanović	SNS	Together We Can Do Everything	1987	Leskovac	
Nataša Jovanović	SNS	Together We Can Do Everything	1966	Kragujevac	
Aleksandar Jugović	SPO	Together We Can Do Everything	1975	Čačak	
Dragomir Karić	PSS–BK	Together We Can Do Everything	1949	Belgrade	
Marko Kešelj	SNS	Together We Can Do Everything	1988	Belgrade	
Jovan Kolundžija	SNS	Together We Can Do Everything	1948	Belgrade	
Đorđe Komlenski	PS	Together We Can Do Everything	1965	Belgrade	
Miroslav Kondić	SNS	Together We Can Do Everything	1980	Odžaci	
Darko Laketić	SNS	Together We Can Do Everything	1975	Prokuplje	
Sanja Lakić	SNS	Together We Can Do Everything	1994	Belgrade	
Miodrag Linta	SNS	Together We Can Do Everything	1969	Belgrade	
Dragana Lukić	SNS	Together We Can Do Everything	1988	Loznica, Klupci	
Nada Macura	SNS	Together We Can Do Everything	1948	Belgrade	
Maja Mačužić Puzić	SNS	Together We Can Do Everything	1977	Kraljevo	
Dušan Marić	SNS	Together We Can Do Everything	1963	Velika Plana	
Aleksandar Marković	SNS	Together We Can Do Everything	1981	Belgrade	
Aleksandar Martinović	SNS	Together We Can Do Everything	1976	Ruma	
Jana Mateović	SNS	Together We Can Do Everything	1992	Sokobanja	
Veroljub Matić	SNS	Together We Can Do Everything	1953	Koceljeva	
Tatjana Medved	SNS	Together We Can Do Everything	1974	Novi Sad	
Milija Miletić	USS	Together We Can Do Everything	1968	Svrljig	
Goran Milić	SNS	Together We Can Do Everything	1982	Sombor	
Svetlana Milijić	SNS	Together We Can Do Everything	1970	Niš	
Ana Miljanić	SNS	Together We Can Do Everything	1982	Požarevac	
Aleksandar Mirković	SNS	Together We Can Do Everything	1988	Belgrade	
Marko Mladenović	SNS	Together We Can Do Everything	1990	Pančevo, Jabuka	
Uglješa Mrdić	SNS	Together We Can Do Everything	1978	Belgrade	
Vesna Nedović	SNS	Together We Can Do Everything	1966	Belgrade	
Ivana Nikolić	SNS	Together We Can Do Everything	1989	Ub, Sovljak	
Milica Nikolić	SNS	Together We Can Do Everything	1993	Požega	
Jasmina Obradović	SNS	Together We Can Do Everything	1961	Novi Sad, Futog	
Jelena Obradović	SNS	Together We Can Do Everything	1982	Knić	
Milica Obradović	SNS	Together We Can Do Everything	1990	Rača, Vučić	
Vladimir Orlić	SNS	Together We Can Do Everything	1983	Belgrade	President of the National Assembly
Lav Grigorije Pajkić	SNS	Together We Can Do Everything	1995	Belgrade	
Jovan Palalić	SNP	Together We Can Do Everything	1971	Belgrade	
Biljana Pantić Pilja	SNS	Together We Can Do Everything	1983	Novi Sad	
Borislava Perić-Ranković	SNS	Together We Can Do Everything	1972	Novi Sad	
Olja Petrović	SNS	Together We Can Do Everything	1990	Pirot - Trnjana	
Tamara Pilipović	SNS	Together We Can Do Everything	1990	Bačka Palanka	
Nenad Popović	SNP	Together We Can Do Everything	1966	Belgrade	
Stojan Radenović	SNS	Together We Can Do Everything	1948	Belgrade	
Milan Radin	SNS	Together We Can Do Everything	1988	Novi Sad	
Dušan Radojević	SNS	Together We Can Do Everything	1990	Čačak	
Zoran Radojičić	SNS	Together We Can Do Everything	1963	Belgrade	
Nikola Radosavljević	SNS	Together We Can Do Everything	1975	Jagodina	
Marina Raguš	SNS	Together We Can Do Everything	1969	Belgrade	
Marijan Rističević	NSS	Together We Can Do Everything	1958	Inđija	
Nenad Ristović	SNS	Together We Can Do Everything	1969	Zaječar	
Ivana Srbulović	SNS	Together We Can Do Everything	1988	Majdanpek	
Rodoljub Stanimirović	SNS	Together We Can Do Everything	1969	Smederevska Palanka - Azanja	
Dragana Stević	SNS	Together We Can Do Everything	1975	Stara Pazova	
Saša Stojanović	SNS	Together We Can Do Everything	1991	Novi Sad - Ledinci	
Momir Stojilković	PSS–BK	Together We Can Do Everything	1961	Vranje	
Nataša Tasić Knežević	SNS	Together We Can Do Everything	1977	Belgrade	
Aleksandra Tomić	SNS	Together We Can Do Everything	1969	Belgrade	
Zoran Tomić	SNS	Together We Can Do Everything	1988	Kruševac	
Bojan Torbica	PS	Together We Can Do Everything	1974	Temerin, Bački Jarak	
Radovan Tvrdišić	SNS	Together We Can Do Everything	1971	Belgrade	
Andrijana Vasić	SNS	Together We Can Do Everything	1992	Leskovac	
Goran Vesić	SNS	Together We Can Do Everything	1969	Belgrade	
Draginja Vlk	SNS	Together We Can Do Everything	1989	Belgrade	
Svetozar Vujačić	SNS	Together We Can Do Everything	1949	Belgrade	
Milimir Vujadinović	SNS	Together We Can Do Everything	1979	Subotica	
Danijela Vujičić	SNS	Together We Can Do Everything	1978	Kosovska Mitrovica	
Marija Zdravković	SNS	Together We Can Do Everything	1973	Belgrade	
Jelena Žarić Kovačević	SNS	Together We Can Do Everything	1981	Niš	
Dušan Bajatović	SPS	Ivica Dačić – Socialist Party of Serbia	1967	Novi Sad	
Nataša Bogunović	SPS	Ivica Dačić – Socialist Party of Serbia	1973	Belgrade, Zvezdara	
Igor Braunović	SPS	Ivica Dačić – Socialist Party of Serbia	1975	Belgrade, Vračar	
Ivica Dačić	SPS	Ivica Dačić – Socialist Party of Serbia	1966	Belgrade, Savski Venac	
Zoltán Dani	SPS	Ivica Dačić – Socialist Party of Serbia	1956	Kovin	
Vladimir Đukić	SPS	Ivica Dačić – Socialist Party of Serbia	1957	Belgrade, Savski Venac	
Tatjana Jovanović	SPS	Ivica Dačić – Socialist Party of Serbia	1968	Leskovac	
Ivan Karić	ZS	Ivica Dačić – Socialist Party of Serbia	1975	Belgrade, Obrenovac	
Dubravka Kralj	SPS	Ivica Dačić – Socialist Party of Serbia	1994	Zrenjanin	
Mirka Lukić Šarkanović	SPS	Ivica Dačić – Socialist Party of Serbia	1968	Novi Sad	
Uglješa Marković	SPS	Ivica Dačić – Socialist Party of Serbia	1991	Belgrade, Stari grad	
Đorđe Milićević	SPS	Ivica Dačić – Socialist Party of Serbia	1978	Valjevo	
Ratko Nikolić	SPS	Ivica Dačić – Socialist Party of Serbia	1977	Aranđelovac	
Snežana Paunović	SPS	Ivica Dačić – Socialist Party of Serbia	1975	Peć	
Dejan Radenković	SPS	Ivica Dačić – Socialist Party of Serbia	1971	Belgrade, Zvezdara	
Dijana Radović	SPS	Ivica Dačić – Socialist Party of Serbia	1989	Priboj	
Andreja Savić	SPS	Ivica Dačić – Socialist Party of Serbia	1947	Belgrade, Vračar	
Dunja Simonović Bratić	SPS	Ivica Dačić – Socialist Party of Serbia	1981	Belgrade, Stari Grad	
Zvonimir Stević	SPS	Ivica Dačić – Socialist Party of Serbia	1957	Priština	
Novica Tončev	SPS	Ivica Dačić – Socialist Party of Serbia	1962	Surdulica	
Vladan Zagrađanin	SPS	Ivica Dačić – Socialist Party of Serbia	1968	Belgrade, New Belgrade	
Natan Albahari	PSG	United – SSP, PSG, Preokret, Sloga	1986	Belgrade	
Dejan Bulatović	SSP	United – SSP, PSG, Preokret, Sloga	1975	Šid, Batrovci	
Đorđo Đorđić	SSP	United – SSP, PSG, Preokret, Sloga	1978	Sremska Mitrovica	
Pavle Grbović	PSG	United – SSP, PSG, Preokret, Sloga	1993	Belgrade	
Danijela Grujić	SSP	United – SSP, PSG, Preokret, Sloga	1974	Novi Sad	
Dalibor Jekić	SSP	United – SSP, PSG, Preokret, Sloga	1977	Kragujevac	
Marija Lukić	SSP	United – SSP, PSG, Preokret, Sloga	1988	Brus	
Jelena Milošević	SSP	United – SSP, PSG, Preokret, Sloga	1988	Niš	
Vladimir Obradović	SSP	United – SSP, PSG, Preokret, Sloga	1977	Belgrade	
Anna Oreg	PSG	United – SSP, PSG, Preokret, Sloga	1985	Novi Sad	
Tatjana Pašić	PSG	United – SSP, PSG, Preokret, Sloga	1964	Belgrade	
Slaviša Ristić	Fatherland	United – SSP, PSG, Preokret, Sloga	1961	Zubin Potok	
Borko Stefanović	SSP	United – SSP, PSG, Preokret, Sloga	1974	Belgrade	
Marinika Tepić	SSP	United – SSP, PSG, Preokret, Sloga	1974	Novi Sad	
Janko Veselinović	PZP	United – SSP, PSG, Preokret, Sloga	1965	Novi Sad	
Željko Veselinović	Sloga	United – SSP, PSG, Preokret, Sloga	1974	Belgrade	
Jelena Bogdanović	POKS	National Democratic Alternative	1988	Belgrade, Rakovica	
Miloratka Bojović	New DSS	National Democratic Alternative	1969	Smederevo	
Gorica Gajić	New DSS	National Democratic Alternative	1958	Svilajnac	
Miloš Jovanović	New DSS	National Democratic Alternative	1976	Belgrade, Vračar	
Predrag Marsenić	New DSS	National Democratic Alternative	1970	Belgrade, New Belgrade	
Vojislav Mihailović	POKS	National Democratic Alternative	1951	Belgrade, Stari Grad	
Dušan Radosavljević	POKS	National Democratic Alternative	1959	Šabac, Prnjavor	
Zoran Sandić	New DSS	National Democratic Alternative	1970	Zrenjanin	
Veroljub Stevanović	POKS	National Democratic Alternative	1946	Kragujevac	
Dejan Šulkić	New DSS	National Democratic Alternative	1972	Velika Plana	
Nenad Tomašević	POKS	National Democratic Alternative	1971	Bečej	
Marija Vojinović	POKS	National Democratic Alternative	1980	Novi Sad	
Miroslav Aleksić	NS	People's Party	1978	Trstenik	
Vladimir Gajić	NS	People's Party	1965	Belgrade	
Vladeta Janković	NS	People's Party	1940	Belgrade	
Stefan Jovanović	NS	People's Party	1989	Belgrade	
Siniša Kovačević	NS	People's Party	1954	Belgrade	
Marina Lipovac Tanasković	NS	People's Party	1978	Belgrade	
Borislav Novaković	NS	People's Party	1964	Novi Sad	
Ivana Parlić	NS	People's Party	1975	Užice	
Slavica Radovanović	NS	People's Party	1966	Belgrade	
Sanda Rašković Ivić	NS	People's Party	1956	Belgrade	
Đorđe Stanković	NS	People's Party	1989	Niš	
Branislav Tomašević	NS	People's Party	1977	Belgrade	
Bojana Bukumirović	SSZ	Serbian Party Oathkeepers	1981	Grocka, Kaluđerica	
Nikola Dragićević	SSZ	Serbian Party Oathkeepers	1994	Belgrade, Čukarica	
Milica Đurđević Stamenkovski	SSZ	Serbian Party Oathkeepers	1990	Belgrade, Voždovac	
Strahinja Erac	SSZ	Serbian Party Oathkeepers	1994	Kraljevo	
Sanja Maric	SSZ	Serbian Party Oathkeepers	1981	Belgrade, Palilula	
Dragana Miljanić	SSZ	Serbian Party Oathkeepers	1978	Belgrade, Zvezdara	
Dragan Nikolić	SSZ	Serbian Party Oathkeepers	1960	Vranje	
Dragan Stojanović	SSZ	Serbian Party Oathkeepers	1952	Belgrade, Palilula	
Dušan Stojiljković	SSZ	Serbian Party Oathkeepers	1982	Belgrade, Rakovica	
Zoran Zečević	SSZ	Serbian Party Oathkeepers	1956	Aranđelovac	
Miodrag Gavrilović	DS	Democratic Party	1973	Belgrade	
Branimir Jovančićević	DS	Democratic Party	1962	Belgrade	
Zoran Lutovac	DS	Democratic Party	1964	Belgrade	
Tatjana Manojlović	DS	Democratic Party	1966	Belgrade	
Ksenija Marković	DS	Democratic Party	1986	Mladenovac	
Srđan Milivojević	DS	Democratic Party	1965	Kruševac	
Nenad Mitrović	DS	Democratic Party	1970	Vladičin Han	
Nebojša Novaković	DS	Democratic Party	1984	Novi Sad	
Dragana Rakić	DS	Democratic Party	1973	Vršac	
Nebojša Cakić	Together	We Must – Together	1962	Leskovac	
Aleksandar Jovanović Ćuta	Together	We Must – Together	1966	Belgrade	
Jelena Kalajdžić	Together	We Must – Together	1990	Novi Sad	
Đorđe Miketić	Together	We Must – Together	1978	Belgrade	
Nikola Nešić	Together	We Must – Together	1988	Kragujevac	
Danijela Nestorović	Together	We Must – Together	1974	Belgrade	
Milinka Nikolić	Together	We Must – Together	1954	Pirot	
Nebojša Zelenović	Together	We Must – Together	1975	Šabac	
Biljana Dragić	ZKS	Unaffiliated parliamentarians	1984	Sombor, Kljajićevo	
Jahja Fehratović	SPP	Unaffiliated parliamentarians	1982	Novi Pazar	
Žika Gojković	ZKS	Unaffiliated parliamentarians	1972	Sombor	
Miloš Parandilović	ZKS	Unaffiliated parliamentarians	1989	Priboj	
Zaim Redžepović	SPP	Unaffiliated parliamentarians	1980	Tutin	
Vesna Savović Petković	ZKS	Unaffiliated parliamentarians	1973	Niš	
Usame Zukorlić	SPP	Unaffiliated parliamentarians	1992	Novi Pazar	
Zagorka Aleksić	JS	United Serbia — Dragan Marković Palma	1987	Belgrade, Čukarica	
Rade Basta	JS	United Serbia — Dragan Marković Palma	1979	Belgrade	
Dejan Ignjatović	JS	United Serbia — Dragan Marković Palma	1972	Gadžin Han	
Marija Jevđić	JS	United Serbia — Dragan Marković Palma	1981	Kraljevo	
Dragan Marković Palma	JS	United Serbia — Dragan Marković Palma	1960	Jagodina, Končarevo	
Života Starčević	JS	United Serbia — Dragan Marković Palma	1968	Jagodina	
Vojislav Vujić	JS	United Serbia — Dragan Marković Palma	1975	Vrnjačka Banja	
Vladan Đukić	PUPS	PUPS – Solidarity and Justice	1959	Belgrade	
Milan Krkobabić	PUPS	PUPS – Solidarity and Justice	1952	Belgrade	
Stefan Krkobabić	PUPS	PUPS – Solidarity and Justice	1989	Belgrade	
Hadži Milorad Stošić	PUPS	PUPS – Solidarity and Justice	1954	Niš	
Jelisaveta Veljković	PUPS	PUPS – Solidarity and Justice	1951	Sremski Karlovci	
Momčilo Vuksanović	PUPS	PUPS – Solidarity and Justice	1952	Despotovac	
Muamer Bačevac	SDP	Social Democratic Party of Serbia	1977	Novi Pazar	
Jasmin Hodžić	SDP	Social Democratic Party of Serbia	1983	Priboj	
Sanja Jefić Branković	SDP	Social Democratic Party of Serbia	1984	Niš	
Branimir Jovanović	SDP	Social Democratic Party of Serbia	1979	Kraljevo - Kovači	
Jasmina Karanac	SDP	Social Democratic Party of Serbia	1967	Belgrade	
Dejana Vasić	SDP	Social Democratic Party of Serbia	1977	Novi Sad	
Milovan Jakovljević	Dveri	Serbian Movement Dveri – Patriotic Bloc	1967	Ivanjica	
Ivan Kostić	Dveri	Serbian Movement Dveri – Patriotic Bloc	1975	Vrbas	
Tamara Milenković Kerković	Dveri	Serbian Movement Dveri – Patriotic Bloc	1965	Niš	
Boško Obradović	Dveri	Serbian Movement Dveri – Patriotic Bloc	1976	Čačak	
Borko Puškić	Dveri	Serbian Movement Dveri – Patriotic Bloc	1981	Prijepolje	
Rada Vasić	Dveri	Serbian Movement Dveri – Patriotic Bloc	1967	Belgrade	
Enis Imamović	SDA S	European Regions	1984	Novi Pazar	
Shaip Kamberi	PVD	European Regions	1964	Bujanovac, Veliki Trnovac	
Selma Kučević	SDA S	European Regions	1991	Tutin	
Aleksandar Olenik	ZZV	European Regions	1973	Belgrade	
Tomislav Žigmanov	DSHV	European Regions	1967	Subotica	
Rozália Ökrész	VMSZ	Alliance of Vojvodina Hungarians	1957	Temerin	
Árpád Fremond	VMSZ	Alliance of Vojvodina Hungarians	1981	Bačka Topola, Pačir	
Elvira Kovács	VMSZ	Alliance of Vojvodina Hungarians	1982	Zrenjanin	
Bálint Pásztor	VMSZ	Alliance of Vojvodina Hungarians	1979	Subotica	
Zsombor Újvári	VMSZ	Alliance of Vojvodina Hungarians	1982	Kanjiža	
Biljana Đorđević	NDB	Green-Left Club – NDB – We Must	1984	Belgrade	
Jelena Jerinić	NDB	Green-Left Club – NDB – We Must	1981	Belgrade	
Robert Kozma	NDB	Green-Left Club – NDB – We Must	1982	Belgrade	
Radomir Lazović	NDB	Green-Left Club – NDB – We Must	1979	Belgrade	
Đorđe Pavićević	NDB	Green-Left Club – NDB – We Must	1982	Belgrade	
