= Dušan Radojević =

Serbian politician

Member of the National Assembly of Serbia
- Incumbent
- Assumed office December 2020

Personal details
- Born: 19 April 1990 (age 35) Čačak, Serbia
- Party: Serbian Progressive Party
- Occupation: Politician

Dušan Radojević (Serbian Cyrillic: Душан Радојевић; born 19 April 1990) is a politician in Serbia. He has served in the National Assembly of Serbia since December 2020 as a member of the Serbian Progressive Party.

== Private career ==
Radojević is a management engineer. He was raised in Čačak and initiated the establishment of the city's youth office. He continues to live in the city.

== Politician ==
=== Municipal politics ===
Radojević received the twenty-second position on the electoral list of the Serbian Progressive Party in the 2012 Serbian local elections in Čačak. The list won fifteen mandates, and he was not initially returned. He was, however, awarded a mandate on 1 July 2015 as the replacement for another party member. He was promoted to the thirteenth position of the party's list in the 2016 local elections and was re-elected when the list won thirty-five mandates.

The Progressive Party formed a coalition government following the 2016 election in Čačak, and Radojević was appointed to municipal council (i.e., the executive branch of the municipal government) on 30 June 2016 with responsibility for youth and culture. He continued in this role until the 2020 local elections, in which he was not a candidate.

=== Parliamentarian ===
Radojević received the 197th position on the party's Aleksandar Vučić — For Our Children list for the 2020 Serbian parliamentary election and missed direct election when the list won a landslide majority with 188 of 250 mandates. He was awarded a mandate on 29 December 2020 as a replacement for Maja Mačužić Puzić, a fellow party member who had resigned. He serves as part of the government's parliamentary majority.
