= List of members of the National Assembly of Serbia, 2020–2022 =

Twelfth convocation of the National Assembly of the Republic of Serbia
←	11th National Assembly	13th National Assembly	→
- Seat composition of the 12th National Assembly

Overview
- Legislative body: National Assembly of Serbia
- Jurisdiction: Serbia
- Meeting place: House of the National Assembly, 13 Nikola Pašić Square, Belgrade
- Term: 3 August 2020 – 1 August 2022
- Election: 21 June 2020
- Members: 250
- President: Ivica Dačić (SPS)
- Party control: ZND–SPS group majority

The 12th convocation of the National Assembly was elected in the 2020 parliamentary election, and it first met on 3 August 2020.

== Total membership by parliamentary groups at the dissolution of the assembly ==
Name	MPs	Status
Aleksandar Vučić – For Our Children	180	Government
Socialist Party of Serbia–Greens of Serbia	24	Government
Alliance of Vojvodina Hungarians	9	Gov't support
Party of United Pensioners of Serbia	9	Government
Social Democratic Party of Serbia	8	Government
United Serbia	8	Gov't support
Party for Democratic Action–Party of Democratic Action of Sandžak	6	Opposition
Justice and Reconciliation Party–United Peasant Party	5	Gov't support
Independent	1	Opposition
Source: National Assembly
