= Sanja Lakić =

Serbian politician

Sanja Lakić (Serbian Cyrillic: Сања Лакић; born 1994) is a politician in Serbia. She was elected to the National Assembly of Serbia in the 2020 parliamentary election as a member of the Serbian Progressive Party.In 2024 she became State Secretary in the Ministry of Family Care and Demography of the Republic of Serbia.

== Early life and career ==
Lakić was born in the village of Karin in Zadar County, Croatia, then part of the self-proclaimed and non-recognized state of the Republika Srpska Krajina (RSK). Her family fled the area in 1995 as the result of the Croatian government's Operation Storm, which resulted in the fall of the RSK; Lakić was one of several children who travelled in an extended convoy of RSK residents seeking refuge in the Republic of Serbia. After reaching the border, her family was resettled in Šabac, where Lakić spent her childhood. She subsequently earned a degree from the University of Belgrade Faculty of Law.

She has remained active with the issues of the Krajina Serb community. In 2015, she received first prize at an oratory competition organized by the Association of the Kingdom of Serbia; she spoke on the topic, "Migration of the Serbian People." Two years later, she founded the Regional School "St. Sava," a free program that allows Serbian children in Croatia to visit Belgrade to promote connections among the Serbian communities of both areas. She is also one of the authors of the collection Dan kada je pala jedna srpska država - RSK ("The Day When a Serbian State Fell – RSK").

== Parliamentarian ==
Lakić received the twenty-fifth position on the Progressive Party's Aleksandar Vučić — For Our Children electoral list for the 2020 Serbian parliamentary election. This was tantamount to election, and she was indeed elected when the list won a landslide victory with 188 mandates.

She is now a member of the assembly committee on the diaspora and Serbs in the region and the committee on the judiciary, public administration, and local self-government; a deputy member of the committee on education, science, technological development, and the information society; the leader of Serbia's delegation to the Interparliamentary Assembly on Orthodoxy; the leader of Serbia's parliamentary friendship group with Malaysia; and a member of the parliamentary friendship groups with Albania, Bosnia and Herzegovina, Canada, China, Croatia, Israel, Italy, North Macedonia, Slovenia, South Africa, Spain, the United Kingdom, and the United States of America.
