= Biljana Dragić =

Serbian politician

- Биљана Драгић

Member of the National Assembly of the Republic of Serbia
- In office 1 August 2022 – 6 February 2024

Personal details
- Born: 1984 (age 41–42)
- Party: POKS (until 2022); Independent (from 2022)

Biljana Dragić (Serbian Cyrillic: Биљана Драгић; born 1984) is a Serbian politician. She was a member of the Serbian national assembly from 2022 to 2024, initially serving with the Movement for the Restoration of the Kingdom of Serbia (POKS) and later as an independent.

== Private career ==
Dragić is from the village of Kljajićevo in Sombor. She holds a bachelor's degree in general chemistry.

== Politician ==
Dragić appeared in the 235th position out of 250 on the POKS's For the Kingdom of Serbia electoral list in the 2020 Serbian parliamentary election. Election from this position was not a realistic prospect, and in any event the list failed to cross the electoral threshold for representation in the national assembly.

The POKS split into two rival factions in late 2021, respectively led by Vojislav Mihailović and Žika Gojković. For a period of several months, both groups claimed to be the legitimately constituted party. Dragić was part of Gojković's faction.

=== Parliamentarian ===
Gojković's faction had the legal right to use the POKS name in the 2022 parliamentary election, which it contested in an alliance with Dveri. Dragić received the fourth position on a combined Dveri–POKS electoral list and was elected when it won ten mandates. Six of the candidates elected on the list were endorsed by Dveri, and four were members of Gojković's POKS faction. Soon after the election, Gojković lost the rights to the POKS name when Mihailović was officially recognized as the party's leader.

In August 2022, Gojković and Dragić, along with a third member of their group, voted for Serbian Progressive Party (SNS) candidate Vladimir Orlić to become the new president of the national assembly. The fourth ex-POKS member, Miloš Parandilović, voted against Orlić and terminated his association with Gojković. Parandilović later accused Dragić of breaking a promise to resign after the first session of parliament to permit another candidate to enter the assembly in her place.

During her assembly term, Dragić was a member of the committee on the rights of the child and the parliamentary friendship groups with Canada, Croatia, Italy, and Slovenia. Along with Gojković, she served in an assembly group with members of the Justice and Reconciliation Party (SPP), the United Peasant Party (USS), and the Democratic Alliance of Croats in Vojvodina (DSHV). She did not seek re-election in 2024.
