= Vladan Zagrađanin =

Serbian politician

- Владан Заграђанин
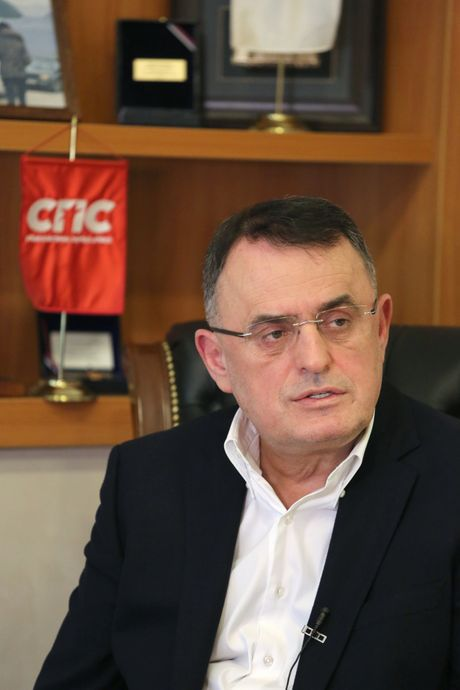

Member of the National Assembly of the Republic of Serbia
- In office 3 June 2016 – 10 October 2024

Personal details
- Born: 30 May 1968 (age 58) Sjenica, SR Serbia, SFR Yugoslavia
- Party: SPS

Vladan Zagrađanin (Serbian Cyrillic: Владан Заграђанин; born 30 May 1968) is a Serbian politician. He served in the Serbian national assembly from 2016 to 2024 and is now a state secretary in Serbia's ministry of internal affairs. Zagrađanin as a member of the Socialist Party of Serbia (SPS).

== Early life and private career ==
Zagrađanin was born in Sjenica, in what was then the Socialist Republic of Serbia in the Socialist Federal Republic of Yugoslavia. He is a graduate of the University of Belgrade Faculty of Law and now resides in Belgrade.

Zagrađanin was executive director of the public enterprise Srbijašume from 1998 to 2000 and president of the Belgrade Youth Council in the same general period. On 2 April 1999, he broke into the opposition B92 radio station with two associates and took it over in the name of the government. The following year, the European Union identified him as a prominent supporter of Slobodan Milošević's administration and included him on a travel ban.

He was later a member of the board of directors of the State Lottery of Serbia from 2004 to 2006. He is kum to Socialist Party leader Ivica Dačić.

== Politician ==
=== Early years ===
Zagrađanin joined the Socialist Party of Serbia on its formation in 1990. From 2003 to 2006, he was the party's business director.

He received the seventy-ninth position on the SPS's electoral list in the 2003 Serbian parliamentary election and was not chosen for a mandate when the list won twenty-two seats. (From 2000 to 2011, Serbian parliamentary mandates were awarded to sponsoring parties or coalitions rather than to individual candidates, and it was common practice for the mandates to be assigned out of numerical order. He could have been given a seat in parliament despite his low position on the list, but this did not occur.)

Zagrađanin was arrested in January 2006 for allegedly attempting to bribe National Bank of Serbia deputy director Dejan Simić with 100,000 Euros to reinstate the Kreditno-Eksportna Banka's operating permit. This case attracted international attention and was dubbed the "suitcase affair" in the Serbian media as the money had been found in a suitcase. Both Simić and Zagrađanin were acquitted by the Higher Court of Belgrade in May 2010, and the acquittal was upheld by the Belgrade Court of Appeal in 2011. During the trial, Ivica Dačić testified that he believed Simić and Zagrađanin had been unfairly targeted.

Serbia's electoral system was reformed in 2011, such that all parliamentary mandates were awarded to candidates on successful lists in numerical order. Zagrađanin received the sixty-fourth position on the Socialist Party's list for the 2014 parliamentary election and was not elected when the list won forty-four mandates.

=== Parliamentarian (2016–present) ===
Zagrađanin was promoted to the twentieth position on the Socialist Party's electoral list for the 2016 parliamentary election and was this time elected to the assembly when the list won twenty-nine seats. The Socialists continued their participation in a coalition government led by the Serbian Progressive Party (SNS) after the election, and Zagrađanin supported the ministry in the assembly. In his first term, he was a member of the assembly's defence and internal affairs committee, a deputy member of the security services control committee, and a member of the parliamentary friendship groups with Austria, Belarus, Belgium, China, Germany, Japan, Kazakhstan, Luxembourg, Montenegro, Russia, Turkey, and the United States of America.

In July 2017, Zagrađanin was chosen as president of the Socialist Party's executive committee.

He appeared in the twenty-first position on the SPS's list in the 2020 parliamentary election and was re-elected when the list won thirty-two seats. In the assembly that followed, he was promoted to deputy chair of the security services control committee and was a member of the judiciary committee (Note: Formally known as the Committee on the Judiciary, Public Administration, and Local Self-Government.) and the defence and international affairs committee, the head of Serbia's parliamentary friendship group with Paraguay, and a member of the friendship groups with China, France, Germany, Hungary, Italy, Russia, the United Arab Emirates, the United Kingdom, and the United States of America.

Zagrađanin was promoted to the ninth position on the SPS's list in the 2022 parliamentary election and was elected to a third term when the list won thirty-one seats. He held the same committee assignments as in the previous parliament, was one of Serbia's delegates to the Interparliamentary Assembly on Orthodoxy, led the parliamentary friendship group with New Zealand and the Pacific Ocean countries (Vanuatu, Tuvalu, Fiji, Nauru, Palau, Papua New Guinea, and the Solomon Islands), and was a member of thirty other friendship groups. (Note: He was a member of the friendship groups with Australia, Austria, Belarus, Belgium, Bosnia and Herzegovina, the Caribbean Countries (Antigua and Barbuda, Barbados, Belize, Dominica, Haiti, Saint Kitts and Nevis, and Saint Lucia), China, Cuba, Cyprus, the Czech Republic, Egypt, France, Germany, Greece, the Holy See, Hungary, Israel, Italy, Japan, Luxembourg, Malta, Morocco, North Macedonia, Russia, Spain, Sweden, Switzerland, Turkey, the United Arab Emirates, and the United States of America.)

For the 2023 Serbian parliamentary election, he received the sixth position on the SPS list and was re-elected even as the list fell to eighteen seats overall. He remains deputy chair of the security services control committee and is a member of the committee on constitutional and legislatives issues, a deputy member of the defence and internal affairs committee, and a member of the parliamentary friendship groups with the Benelux, China, Greece, Italy and the Holy See, and Switzerland. The SPS has continued its participation in Serbia's SNS-led government throughout his time in parliament.

He continues to serve as president of the SPS's executive board and is a member of the party presidency.

=== State Secretary ===
Zagrađanin was appointed as a state secretary in Serbia's ministry of internal affairs on 10 October 2024. He was required to resign from the national assembly on accepting this position.
