= Danijela Vujičić =

Serbian politician

Member of the National Assembly of Serbia
- Incumbent
- Assumed office 2020

Personal details
- Born: 1978 (age 47–48)
- Party: Serbian Progressive Party

Danijela Vujičić (Serbian Cyrillic: Данијела Вујичић; born 1978) is a politician in Serbia. She was elected to the National Assembly of Serbia in the 2020 parliamentary election as a member of the Serbian Progressive Party.

== Private career ==
Vujičić has a master's degree in communications. She is from northern Kosovska Mitrovica in the disputed territory recognized in Serbia as Kosovo and Metohija.

== Politician ==
=== Municipal politics and Government of Kosovo ===
Vujičić entered political life in 2001 and joined the G17 Plus party on its founding in 2002. She served as a G17 Plus representative in the assembly of northern Kosovska Mitrovica before 2013.

She led the electoral list of the Civic Initiative "Srpska" in northern Kosovska Mitrovica in the 2013 Kosovan local elections. These were the first local elections to be held in Kosovo's Serb communities following the 2013 Brussels Agreement, which normalized some relations between the governments of Serbia and Kosovo without resolving the status of the territory. The "Srpska" list received six mandates, winning a narrow victory over Oliver Ivanović's Civic Initiative "SDP," and she served in the local assembly.

Vujičić was given the eighteenth position on the list of the Serb List for northern Kosovska Mitrovica in the 2017 Kosovan local elections. The list won a majority victory with fourteen of nineteen mandates. She was not initially returned, although she subsequently received a mandate as the replacement for another Serb List member.

At one time, Vujičić represented the Serb List as chief of cabinet for the Kosovo ministry of agriculture.

=== Republic of Serbia ===
G17 Plus merged into the United Regions of Serbia (URS) in 2013, and Vujičić appeared in the twenty-fourth position on the URS list in the 2014 Serbian parliamentary election. The list did not cross the electoral threshold to win representation in the assembly. The URS dissolved after the election, and Vujičić subsequently joined the Progressive Party.

She received the fifty-fourth position on the Progressive Party's Aleksandar Vučić — For Our Children electoral list in the 2020 parliamentary election and was elected when the list won a landslide victory with 188 out of 250 mandates. She is a member of the assembly committee on labour, social issues, social inclusion, and poverty reduction; a deputy member of the committee on Kosovo-Metohija and the European integration committee; a deputy member of Serbia's delegation to the North Atlantic Treaty Organization (NATO) Parliamentary Assembly (where Serbia has observer status); the leader of Serbia's parliamentary friendship group with Madagascar; and a member of the friendship groups with the Bahamas, Botswana, Cameroon, the Central African Republic, Comoros, the Dominican Republic, Ecuador, Equatorial Guinea, Eritrea, Greece, Grenada, Guinea-Bissau, Israel, Jamaica, Kyrgyzstan, Laos, Liberia, Mali, Mauritius, Mozambique, Nauru, Nicaragua, Nigeria, Palau, Papua New Guinea, Paraguay, the Republic of Congo, Saint Vincent and the Grenadines, Sao Tome and Principe, Solomon Islands, South Sudan, Spain, Sri Lanka, Sudan, Suriname, Togo, Trinidad and Tobago, Tunisia, the United Arab Emirates, the United States of America, Uruguay, and Uzbekistan.
