= Vesna Nedović =

Serbian politician

Vesna Nedović (Serbian Cyrillic: Весна Недовић; born 3 September 1966) is a Serbian politician. She has served in the National Assembly of Serbia since 2020 as a member of the Serbian Progressive Party.

== Private career ==
Nedović has a master's degree as an engineer in management.

== Politician ==
=== Municipal politics ===
Nedović received the forty-second position on the Progressive Party's electoral list for the Zemun municipal assembly in Belgrade in the 2009 Serbian local elections. The list won a plurality victory with twenty-three seats and Nedović was subsequently selected for a mandate. (Prior to an electoral reform in 2011, mandates were distributed to list candidates at the discretion of successful parties or coalitions, and it was common practice for the mandates to be assigned out of numerical order.) She did not seek re-election in 2013.

In 2016, Nedović was appointed as a citizen member of the Zemun municipal committee for budget and finance.

=== Parliamentarian ===
Nedović was given the 150th position on the Progressive Party's Aleksandar Vučić — For Our Children list in the 2020 Serbian parliamentary election and was elected when the list won a landslide majority with 188 out of 250 mandates. She is a member of the committee on human and minority rights and gender equality; a deputy member of the committee on constitutional and legislative issues and the committee on administrative, budgetary, mandate, and immunity issues; and a member of Serbia's parliamentary friendship groups with China, Greece, Russia, and Turkey.
