= Goran Milić (Serbian politician) =

Serbian politician

Goran Milić (Serbian Cyrillic: Горан Милић; born 1982) is a politician and administrator in Serbia. He has served in the National Assembly of Serbia since 2020 as a member of the Serbian Progressive Party.

== Early life and career ==
Milić was born in Sombor, Vojvodina, in what was then the Socialist Republic of Serbia in the Socialist Federal Republic of Yugoslavia. He was raised in the city and has a degree in law. He was head of the mayor's office in Sombor from 2014 to 2016, and he subsequently served on the municipal council (i.e., the executive branch of the municipal government) with responsibility for international co-operation and co-operation with republic and provincial bodies. In this capacity, he visited the reception center for migrants in Sombor in 2016.

== Politician ==
Milić received the 121st position on the Progressive Party's Aleksandar Vučić — For Our Children list in the 2020 parliamentary election and was elected when the list won a landslide majority with 188 mandates. He is now a member of the assembly committee on the diaspora and Serbs in the region, a deputy member of the foreign affairs committee, and the European integration committee, and the parliamentary friendship groups with Argentina, Austria, Belgium, Bosnia and Herzegovina, Brazil, Bulgaria, Canada, China, Croatia, Cuba, Cyprus, the Czech Republic, Denmark, Finland, France, Georgia, Germany, Greece, Hungary, Ireland, Israel, Italy, Japan, Malta, Montenegro, the Netherlands, North Macedonia, Norway, Poland, Romania, Russia, Slovakia, Slovenia, South Africa, South Korea, Spain, Sweden, Switzerland, Turkey, the United Kingdom, and the United States of America.
