= Mirka Lukić Šarkanović =

Serbian politician (born 1968)

- Мирка Лукић Шаркановић
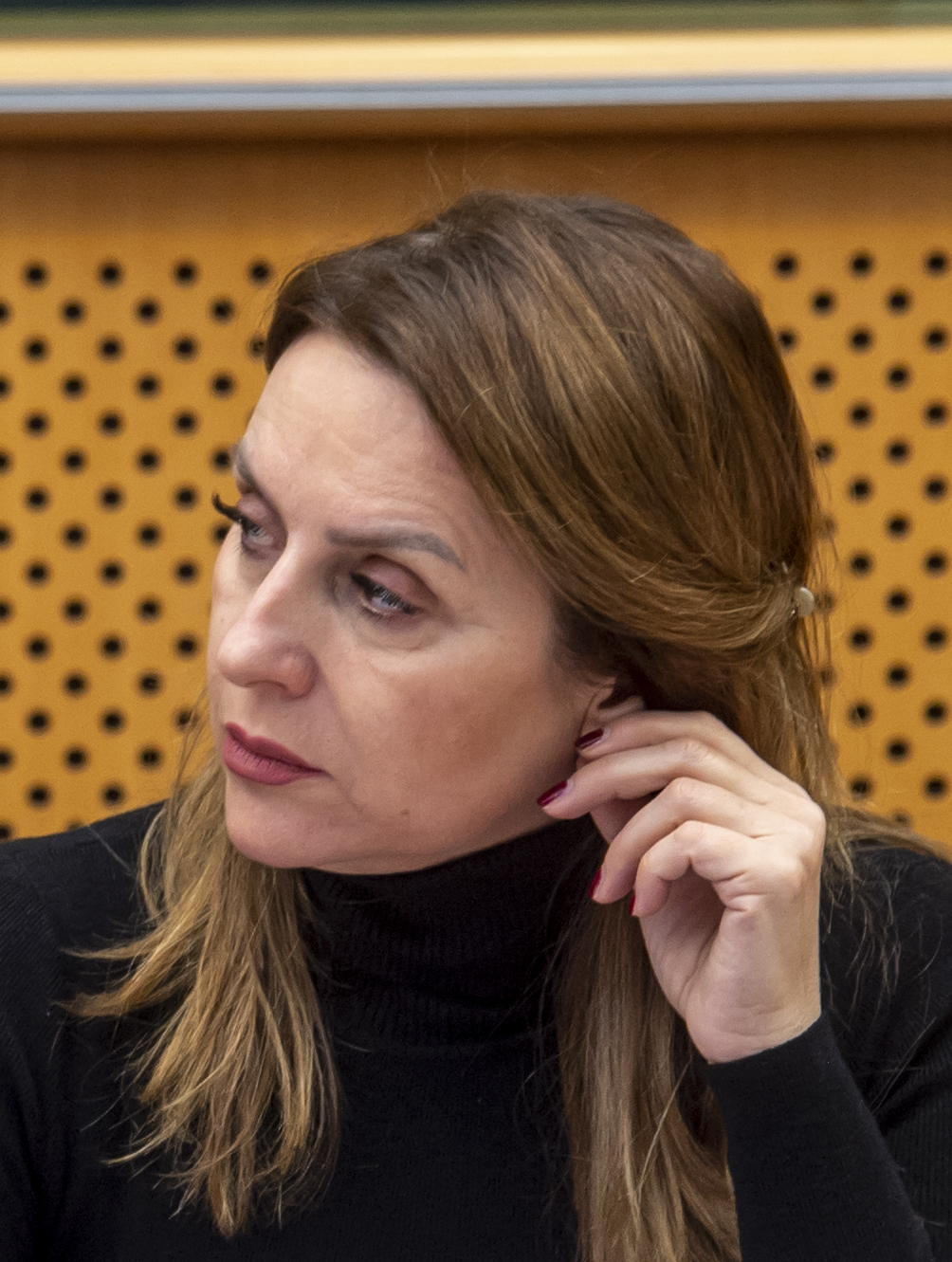
- Šarkanović in 2023

Member of the National Assembly of the Republic of Serbia
- Incumbent
- Assumed office 1 August 2022

Personal details
- Born: 12 October 1968 (age 57) Novi Sad, SAP Vojvodina, SR Serbia, SFR Yugoslavia
- Party: SPS

Mirka Lukić Šarkanović (Serbian Cyrillic: Мирка Лукић Шаркановић; born 12 October 1968) is a Serbian medical doctor, academic, and politician. She has served in the Serbian national assembly since 2022 as a member of the Socialist Party of Serbia (SPS).

== Early life and career ==
Lukić Šarkanović was born in Novi Sad, in what was then the Socialist Autonomous Province of Vojvodina in the Socialist Republic of Serbia, Socialist Federal Republic of Yugoslavia. She completed elementary and secondary school in Loznica, graduated from the University of Novi Sad Faculty of Medicine in 1995, defended her doctoral dissertation at the same institution in 2012, and completed her sub-specialization in pain medicine in 2017. She is an assistant with doctorate at the University of Novi Sad Faculty of Medicine and an assistant professor at the Faculty of Dentistry in Pančevo. Lukić Šarkanović has worked at the Clinical Centre of Vojvodina since 2000 and has published widely in her field.

== Politician ==
Lukić Šarkanović joined the Socialist Party on its formation in 1990.

=== Local and provincial politics ===
Lukić Šarkanović appeared in the third position on the Socialist Party's electoral list for Novi Sad in the 2016 Serbian local elections. The list won seven seats, and she was elected to the city assembly. The Socialists participated in a coalition government led by the Serbian Progressive Party (SNS) in the term that followed. She again appeared in the third position on the party's list for the 2020 local elections and was re-elected when the list won ten seats. She was not a candidate in 2024.

Lukić Šarkanović appeared in the twentieth position on the Socialist Party's list for the Assembly of Vojvodina in the 2020 provincial election. The list won thirteen mandates, and she was not elected.

=== Parliamentarian ===
Lukić Šarkanović received the forty-eighth position on the SPS's list in the 2020 Serbian parliamentary election and was not elected when the list won thirty-two seats.

She was promoted to the twenty-eighth position on the party's list in the 2022 parliamentary election and was elected when the list won thirty-one seats. The governing Serbian Progressive Party and its allies won the election, and the Socialists continued their participation in a coalition government. In her first term, Lukić Šarkanović was a member of the education committee, (Note: Formally known as the Committee on Education, Science, Technological Development, and the Information Society.) a deputy member of the labour committee (Note: Formally known as the Committee on Labour, Social Issues, Social Inclusion, and Poverty Reduction.) and the health and family committee, the head of Serbia's parliamentary friendship group with the Dominican Republic, and a member of the friendship groups with Algeria, Austria, Gabon, Germany, Myanmar, Russia, Slovakia, Suriname, and Switzerland.

Lukić Šarkanović appeared in the eighth position on the SPS's list in the 2023 parliamentary election and was re-elected when the list won eighteen seats. She is now a member of the health and family committee, the committee on the rights of the child, and the committee on human and minority rights and gender equality; a deputy member of the education committee and the culture and information committee; the deputy chair of the Republic of Serbia–Republika Srpska parliamentary forum; and a member of the parliamentary friendship groups with Algeria, Bosnia and Herzegovina, Slovakia, and Switzerland.
