= Nataša Ivanović =

Serbian politician

- Наташа Ивановић

Member of the National Assembly of Serbia
- Incumbent
- Assumed office 2020

Personal details
- Born: 9 August 1978 (age 47) Split, Yugoslavia
- Party: Serbian Progressive Party

Nataša Ivanović (Serbian Cyrillic: Наташа Ивановић; born 9 August 1978) is a politician in Serbia. She has served in the National Assembly of Serbia since 2020 as a member of the Serbian Progressive Party.

== Early life and private career ==
Ivanović was born in Split, in what was then the Socialist Republic of Croatia in the Socialist Federal Republic of Yugoslavia. She was raised in Petrovac na Mlavi in Serbia and graduated from the Belgrade Higher School for teacher education, with further studies in Jagodina and Bujanovac. She has been an educator at "Galeb" Petrovac na Mlavi since 2003 and became director of the institution in 2016.

== Politician ==
=== Municipal politics ===
Ivanović served in the Petrovac na Mlavi municipal assembly following the 2012 Serbian local elections as a Progressive Party member. She was given the sixth position on the party's list in the 2016 local elections and was re-elected when the list won twenty-five out of fifty mandates.

For the 2020 local elections, she received the fifth position on the Progressive Party's list and was elected to a third term when the list won a clear majority with thirty-five mandates.

=== Parliamentarian ===
Ivanović appeared on the Progressive Party's electoral lists in the national assembly elections of 2014 and 2016, respectively in the 210th and 208th positions (out of 250). These numbers were too low for election to be a realistic possibility on either occasion, and indeed she was not elected despite the lists winning majority victories each time.

She was promoted to the 111th position on the Progressive Party's Aleksandar Vučić — For Our Children list in the 2020 parliamentary election and was elected when the list won a landslide majority with 188 mandates. Ivanović is now a member of the assembly's health and family committee and the committee on the rights of the child, a deputy member of the environmental protection committee, the head of Serbia's parliamentary friendship group with Palau, and a member of the parliamentary friendship groups with Australia, Austria, Belgium, Brazil, Canada, China, Croatia, Egypt, France, Germany, Greece, Hungary, India, Italy, Japan, Mexico, Morocco, the Netherlands, Norway, Russia, Slovenia, Spain, Sweden, Switzerland, Tunisia, Turkey, the United Kingdom, the United States of America, and Venezuela.
