= Radovan Tvrdišić =

Serbian politician

- Радован Тврдишић

Vice President of the National Assembly
- Incumbent
- Assumed office 22 October 2020
- President: Ivica Dačić

Personal details
- Born: 10 September 1971 (age 55) Bijelo Polje, SR Montenegro, SFR Yugoslavia
- Party: SNS (2021–present); SPAS (2018–2021); Dveri (2000–2015)
- Education: University of Belgrade
- Profession: Lawyer

Radovan Tvrdišić (Serbian Cyrillic: Радован Тврдишић; born 10 September 1971) is a Serbian lawyer and politician who is currently serving as a Vice President of the National Assembly. He is a member of the ruling Serbian Progressive Party and was previously a member of the Serbian Patriotic Alliance and Dveri.

== Biography ==
Tvrdišić was born in 1971 in Bijelo Polje, SR Montenegro, SFR Yugoslavia.

He graduated from the University of Belgrade Faculty of Law.

From 2004 to 2015, he was a member of the Main Board of Dveri. During theregistration of Dveri as a political party he came into conflict with the planned party leadership, led by Boško Obradović and Srđan Nogo due to disagreement with the idea of growing the organization into a political party. At the party's founding assembly, he voted for the election of Boško Obradović as president, but he continued to oppose the way the statute was passed and the powers of the president and he soon left Dveri.

He served as the President of the Assembly of the City Municipality of New Belgrade in the period 2016–2020.

He was elected a Member of the National Assembly in the 2020 parliamentary elections, as a candidate of the Serbian Patriotic Alliance. He was elected Vice President of the National Assembly at a session held on 22 October 2020.
