= Rozália Ökrész =

Serbian politician

- Ökrész Rozália

Member of the National Assembly of the Republic of Serbia
- In office 1 December 2020 – 6 February 2024

Personal details
- Born: 2 November 1957 (age 68)
- Party: VMSZ

Rozália Ökrész (Serbian Cyrillic: Розалија Екрес, romanized: Rozalija Ekres; born 2 November 1957) is a Serbian politician from the country's Hungarian community. She served in the Serbian parliament from 2020 to 2024 as a member of the Alliance of Vojvodina Hungarians (VMSZ).

== Private career ==
Ökrész is a graduated economist living in Temerin. She became the director of the Vojvodina Hungarian-language newspaper Magyar Szó (English: Hungarian Word) in 2012 and remained in this role until her resignation in November 2022. She has also worked in Vojvodina's secretariat of education and culture and served on the board of directors of the Clinical Center of Vojvodina.

== Politician ==
=== Local politics (2004–16) ===
Ökrész received the twenty-fourth position on the VMSZ's electoral list in Temerin for the 2004 Serbian local elections. In this election cycle, one-third of assembly mandates were given to candidates on successful lists in numerical order, while the remaining two-thirds were assigned to other candidates at the discretion of the sponsoring parties or coalitions. The VMSZ won three seats out of thirty-three in Temerin; Ökrész was not elected and did not receive an "optional" mandate.

Serbia's electoral laws were reformed in 2011, such that all mandates were assigned to candidates on successful lists in numerical order. Ökrész led the party's list for Temerin in the 2012 local elections and was elected when the list again won three seats. She served in the local assembly for term that followed and was not a candidate for re-election in 2016.

=== Parliamentarian (2020–24) ===
Ökrész appeared in the sixteenth position on the VMSZ's list in the 2014 Serbian parliamentary election. The list won six seats, and she was not elected.

The VMSZ led a successful drive to increase its voter turnout in the 2020 parliamentary election and won a record nine seats. Ökrész, who appeared in the tenth position on the party's list, was not immediately elected but received a mandate on 1 December 2020 as the replacement for Annamária Vicsek, who had been appointed to a secretary of state position. In her first parliamentary term, Ökrész was a member of the culture and information committee and the committee on the rights of the child, a deputy member of the finance committee (Note: Formally known as the Committee on Finance, State Budget, and Control of Public Spending.) and the labour committee, (Note: Formally known as the Committee on Labour, Social Issues, Social Inclusion, and Poverty Reduction.) and a member of the parliamentary friendship groups with Finland and Portugal.

She was promoted to the fifth position on the VMSZ's list in the 2022 parliamentary election and was re-elected when the list won five mandates. She served afterward as a member of the culture and information committee and the finance committee; a deputy member of the labour committee, the European integration committee, and the committee on the rights of the child; a member of the subcommittee for the consideration of reports on audits conducted by the state audit institution; a substitute member of Serbia's delegation to the parliamentary dimension of the Central European Initiative; and a member of the parliamentary friendship groups with Croatia, France, and Slovakia. Throughout Ökrész's time in the national assembly, the VMSZ supported Serbia's coalition government led by the Serbian Progressive Party (SNS).

Ökrész received the eighteenth position on the VMSZ's list in the 2023 Serbian parliamentary election. Re-election from this position was not a realistic prospect, and she was not elected when the list won six seats. Her term ended when the new assembly convened in February 2024.
