= Milica Obradović =

Serbian politician

Milica Obradović (Serbian Cyrillic: Милица Обрадовић; born 19 December 1990) is a politician in Serbia. She has served in the National Assembly of Serbia since 2020 as a member of the Serbian Progressive Party.

== Early life and career ==
Obradović was born in Rača, Republic of Serbia, in what was then the Socialist Federal Republic of Yugoslavia. She lives in the village of Vučić in the municipality and holds a bachelor's degree in journalism.

== Politician ==
=== Municipal politics ===
Obradović received the fifteenth position on the Progressive Party's electoral list for the Rača municipal assembly in the 2016 Serbian local elections. The list won nine mandates, and she was not returned. She was promoted to the third position in the 2020 local elections and was elected when the list won a majority victory with twenty-three out of twenty-seven mandates.

=== Parliamentarian ===
Obradović was given the 187th position on the Progressive Party's Aleksandar Vučić — For Our Children list for the 2020 Serbian parliamentary election and was elected when the list won a landslide majority with 188 mandates. She is now a member of the culture and information committee and the committee on Kosovo-Metohija, a deputy member of the European integration committee, a deputy member of Serbia's delegation to the South-East European Cooperation Process parliamentary assembly, the leader of Serbia's parliamentary friendship group with Rwanda, and a member of the parliamentary friendship groups with the Bahamas, Belgium, Botswana, Cameroon, the Central African Republic, China, Comoros, the Dominican Republic, Ecuador, Equatorial Guinea, Eritrea, France, Germany, Greece, Grenada, Guinea-Bissau, Italy, Jamaica, Kyrgyzstan, Laos, Liberia, Luxembourg, Madagascar, Mali, Mauritius, Mozambique, Nauru, Nicaragua, Nigeria, Palau, Papua New Guinea, Paraguay, the Republic of Congo, Saint Vincent and the Grenadines, São Tomé and Príncipe, the Solomon Islands, South Sudan, South Korea, Spain, Sri Lanka, Sudan, Suriname, Switzerland, Togo, Trinidad and Tobago, the United Arab Emirates, the United Kingdom, the United States of America, Uruguay, and Uzbekistan.
