= Miroslav Kondić =

Serbian politician

Miroslav Kondić (Serbian Cyrillic: Мирослав Кондић; born 1980) is a politician in Serbia. He has served in the local government of Odžaci and was elected to the National Assembly of Serbia in the 2020 parliamentary election. Kondić is a member of the Serbian Progressive Party.

== Private life ==
Kondić has a bachelor's degree in economics. He lives in Odžaci, in the province of Vojvodina.

== Politician ==
=== Municipal ===
Kondić received the sixteenth position on the Progressive Party's electoral list for the Odžaci municipal assembly in the 2013 Serbian local elections and was elected when the list won exactly sixteen mandates. When the assembly met in January 2014, he was chosen as deputy mayor of the municipality. Kondić received the ninth position on the Progressive list in the 2017 Serbian local elections and was re-elected when the list again won sixteen mandates. He was again selected as deputy mayor following the election.

Kondić has also served as secretary of the Progressive Party's board in Odžaci. In 2019, he participated in a party delegation on a research visit to China.

=== Parliamentarian ===
Kondić received the 106th position on the Progressive Party's Aleksandar Vučić — For Our Children list in the 2020 election and was elected when the list won a landslide majority with 188 mandates. He is a member of the assembly committee on administrative, budgetary, mandate, and immunity issues; a deputy member of the European integration committee and the committee on labour, social issues, social inclusion, and poverty reduction; the head of Serbia's parliamentary friendship group with Uruguay; and a member of the parliamentary friendship groups with China, Denmark, France, Germany, Greece, Italy, Japan, Russia, and Spain.
