= Momir Stojilković =

Serbian politician

Momir Stojilković (Serbian Cyrillic: Момир Стојилковић; born 14 July 1961) is a politician in Serbia. He has served in the local government of Vranje and has been a member of the National Assembly of Serbia since 2020, serving with the Strength of Serbia Movement.

== Early life and private career ==
Stojilković graduated from the Faculty of Agriculture in Zemun, Belgrade, with a degree in agricultural engineering (1986) and worked in the sector for several years. He lives in Vranje. He is related by marriage to Strength of Serbia Movement leader Bogoljub Karić: his son is married to Karić's daughter.

== Politician ==
=== Municipal politicians ===
Stojilković was a member of the Vranje city assembly prior to the 2012 Serbian local elections, serving with the Serbian Progressive Party. He received the twenty-third position on the Progressive Party's electoral list in the 2012 municipal election and, as the list won fourteen mandates, was not initially returned. He was awarded a new mandate in early 2014 as the replacement for another party delegate.

He was promoted to the fourth position on the Progressive Party's list for the Vranje city assembly in the 2016 Serbian local elections and was re-elected when the list won a majority victory with thirty-five mandates. Following the election, he served as vice-president of the local Progressive Party board and as director of the municipal service organization JKP Komrad. He was removed from both of these positions in 2019 against the backdrop of a division of in the local branch of the party. Several workers from Komrad protested against his dismissal, without success.

Stojilković subsequently left the Progressive Party and joined the Strength of Serbia Movement. In March 2020, he was selected as vice-president of the party.

=== Parliamentarian ===
The Strength of Serbia Movement contested the 2020 Serbian parliamentary election in an alliance with the Serbian Progressive Party, and, notwithstanding his controversy with the local party board in Vranje, Strojilković received the 120th position on the party's Aleksandar Vučić — For Our Children electoral list. He was elected when the list won a landslide majority with 188 out of 250 mandates. Stojilković is now a member of the agriculture, forestry, and water management committee; a deputy member of the environmental protection committee and the committee on labour, social issues, social inclusion, and poverty reduction; the head of Serbia's parliamentary friendship group with Bahrain; and a member of the parliamentary friendship groups with Australia, Belarus, Belgium, China, France, Germany, Greece, Hungary, Israel, Romania, Russia, Slovakia, Spain, Sweden, and Turkey.
