= Tamara Pilipović =

Serbian politician (born 1990)

Tamara Pilipović (Serbian Cyrillic: Тамара Пилиповић; born 17 November 1990) is a Serbian politician. A member of the Serbian Progressive Party, she was elected to the National Assembly of Serbia in the 2020 Serbian parliamentary election.

== Early life and career ==
Pilipović was born in Bačka Palanka, Vojvodina, Republic of Serbia, in what was then the Socialist Federal Republic of Yugoslavia. She is an economic technician in private life.

== Politician ==
=== Municipal politics ===
Pilipović received the ninth position on the Progressive Party's electoral list for the Bačka Palanka municipal assembly in the 2016 Serbian municipal elections and was elected when the list won twenty mandates. The Progressives became the leading force in the municipality's coalition government after the election, and she served for the next four years as a government supporter. Pilipović was active in the oversight of JKP Komunalprojekt during this time. She did not seek re-election in 2020.

=== Parliamentarian ===
Pilipović was awarded the fifty-seventh position on the Progressive Party's Aleksandar Vučić — For Our Children electoral list in the 2020 parliamentary election and was elected when the list won a landslide victory with 188 out of 250 mandates. She is now a member of the assembly committee on Kosovo-Metohija, a deputy member of the defence and internal affairs committee and the committee on human and minority rights and gender equality, the leader of Serbia's parliamentary friendship group with Morocco, and a member of the parliamentary friendship groups with the Bahamas, Belarus, Bosnia and Herzegovina, Botswana, Cameroon, the Central African Republic, China, Comoros, the Dominican Republic, Ecuador, Equatorial Guinea, Eritrea, Finland, Greece, Grenada, Guinea-Bissau, India, Indonesia, Jamaica, Japan, Kyrgyzstan, Laos, Liberia, Madagascar, Mali, Mauritius, Montenegro, Mozambique, Nauru, Nicaragua, Nigeria, Palau, Papua New Guinea, Paraguay, Poland, Qatar, the Republic of Congo, Russia, Saint Vincent and the Grenadines, Sao Tome and Principe, the Solomon Islands, South Sudan, Spain, Sri Lanka, Sudan, Suriname, Togo, Trinidad and Tobago, Turkey, the United Arab Emirates, Uruguay, and Uzbekistan.
