= Biljana Pantić Pilja =

Serbian politician (born 1983)

- Биљана Пантић Пиља
- Born: 11 May 1983 (age 43); Novi Sad, Yugoslavia
- Occupation: Politician

Biljana Pantić Pilja (Биљана Пантић Пиља; born 11 May 1983), formerly known as Biljana Pantić, is a politician in Serbia. She has served in the National Assembly of Serbia since 2012 as a member of the Serbian Progressive Party.

== Private career ==
Pantić Pilja has a bachelor's and a master's degrees from the University of Novi Sad Faculty of Law. A lawyer profession, she has worked with the firm Vučević since 2011. Pantić Pilja lives in Novi Sad.

== Political career ==
=== Municipal politics ===
Pantić Pilja received the 46th position on the electoral list of the far-right Serbian Radical Party for the Novi Sad municipal assembly in the 2008 Serbian local elections. The party won 26 out of 78 mandates, and Pantić Pilja did not serve in its assembly delegation.

The Radical Party experienced a serious split later in 2008, with several members joining the more moderate Progressive Party under the leadership of Tomislav Nikolić and Aleksandar Vučić. Pantić Pilja sided with the Progressives.

=== Parliamentarian ===
Pantić Pilja was given the 60th position on the Progressive Party's Let's Get Serbia Moving electoral list in the 2012 Serbian parliamentary election. The list won 73 mandates, after which she was elected. Upon the election, the Progressive Party formed a new coalition government with the Socialist Party of Serbia and other parties; Pantić Pilja served as part of its parliamentary majority. She moved to the 36th position on the successor Aleksandar Vučić — Future We Believe In list for the 2014 parliamentary election and re-elected when the list won a landslide victory with 158 out of 250 mandates. In the 2016, she received the eighteenth position on the Progressive Party's list and was re-elected when it won a second consecutive majority with 131 mandates.

Between 2016 and 2020, Pantić Pilja was the deputy chair of the assembly committee on the judiciary, public administration, and local self-government; a member of the European integration committee; a deputy member of the committee on administrative, budgetary, mandate, and immunity issues; the head of the parliamentary friendship group with Cyprus; and a member of the parliamentary friendship groups with Austria, Azerbaijan, China, Germany, Greece, Iraq, Italy, Japan, Russia, Switzerland, and the United States of America.

Pantić Pilja is also a member of Serbia's delegation to the Parliamentary Assembly of the Council of Europe; she was first appointed as a substitute member in 2014 and was promoted to a full member in 2016. She sits with the European People's Party group; is a member of the committee on equality and non-discrimination and the committee on migration, refugees, and displaced persons; and is an alternate member of the committee on the election of judges to the European Court of Human Rights. In January 2020, she was appointed as vice-chairwoman of the latter committee. She was also appointed to the sub-committee on refugee and migrant children and young people in March 2019 and has served as a member of the sub-committee on gender equality on two occasions.

Pantić Pilja received the 42nd position on the Progressive Party's list in the 2020 Serbian parliamentary election and was elected to a fourth term when the list won a landslide majority with 188 mandates. She remained deputy chairwoman of the judiciary committee, a member of Serbia's delegation to the parliamentary assembly of the Council of Europe, and the head of Serbia's parliamentary friendship group with Cyprus. Pantić Pilja is a member of the friendship groups with Azerbaijan, China, Denmark, France, Germany, Israel, Italy, Japan, Russia, Spain, the United Arab Emirates, and the United States.
