= Sanja Jefić Branković =

Serbian politician

Sanja Jefić Branković (Serbian Cyrillic: Сања Јефић Бранковић; born 1984), formerly known as Sanja Jefić, is a politician in Serbia. She served in the National Assembly of Serbia from 2012 to 2014, initially as a member of the Liberal Democratic Party (LDP) and subsequently as an independent. She was re-elected to the assembly in the 2020 Serbian parliamentary election as a member of the Social Democratic Party of Serbia (SDPS). Jefić Branković has also served in the city assembly of Niš on two occasions.

== Private career ==
Jefić Branković was born in Niš, and what was then the Socialist Republic of Serbia in the Socialist Federal Republic of Yugoslavia. She is a lawyer based in the city. She has also worked with the government of Serbia's Office of Human and Minority Rights in the city.

== Politician ==
Jefić Branković appeared on the Liberal Democratic Party's electoral lists for the national assembly in the elections of 2007 and 2008. She was not selected for a mandate on either occasion. She also ran for the Niš city assembly in the 2008 Serbian local elections and did not initially receive a mandate. She was appointed to the city assembly in late 2011 as a replacement for Marina Jovanović and served until the end of her term in 2012.

She received the eighteenth position on the LDP's Preokret (U-Turn) coalition list and was elected when the list won nineteen mandates. She also received the third position on the Preokret list for the Niš municipal assembly in the concurrent 2012 Serbian local elections and won re-election when the list won four mandates, although she appears to have declined her mandate in order to serve exclusively in the national assembly. After the election, a new government was formed at the republic level by the Socialist Party of Serbia, the Serbian Progressive Party, and other parties, and the LDP served in opposition. During this time, Jefić Branković was a member on the assembly committee on the diaspora and Serbs in the region and the committee on the rights of the child, and a deputy member of the committee on environmental protection and the committee on agriculture, forestry, and water management.

Her term as a LDP member of the assembly was ultimately brief. Several party members in Niš, including Jefić Branković, announced their resignations en masse in November 2012. She served as an independent member of parliament for the remainder of her term. By virtue of leaving the party, she was removed from her committee assignments in June 2013. In the same month, she strongly criticized a decision by Serbia's ministry of culture not to fund the "Nišvil" jazz festival. She did not seek re-election in 2014.

Jefić Branković subsequently joined the SDPS, which contested the 2016 Niš City Assembly election on a coalition list led by the Serbian Progressive Party. She received the twenty-first position and was elected when the coalition won twenty-eight mandates. She subsequently became the deputy leader of an assembly grouping that also included the Movement of Socialists and the United Peasant Party, both of which were also aligned with the Progressives. She was not a candidate in the 2020 local elections.

She received the sixtieth position on the Progressive Party's Aleksandar Vučić — For Our Children coalition list in the 2020 Serbian parliamentary election and was elected to a second term in the national assembly when the list won a landslide majority with 188 mandates. She is now a member of the committee on the judiciary, public administration, and local self-government; a deputy member of the committee on education, science, technological development, and the information society; a deputy member of the committee on Kosovo-Metohija; a deputy member of the committee on administrative, budgetary, mandate, and immunity issues; the leader of Serbia's parliamentary friendship group with Pakistan; and a member of the friendship groups with Germany, Hungary, Japan, Papua New Guinea, Sri Lanka, Turkey, the United States of America, and Uzbekistan.
