= Vojislav Vujić =

Serbian politician

Vojislav Vujić (Serbian Cyrillic: Војислав Вујић; born 29 October 1975) is a politician in Serbia. He has served in the National Assembly of Serbia since 2012 as a member of United Serbia (Jedinstvena Srbija, JS).

== Early life and career ==
Vujić was born in Aleksandrovac, then part of the Socialist Republic of Serbia in the Socialist Federal Republic of Yugoslavia. He has a degree in economics, was commercial director of the fashion company Todor from 2000 to 2007, and worked at Eurobank Ergasias from 2007 to 2008. He lives in Vrnjačka Banja.

== Political career ==
United Serbia has been aligned with the Socialist Party of Serbia since 2008. In the 2008 Serbian parliamentary election, Vujić received the fifty-first position on the Socialist-led electoral list, which was mostly arranged in alphabetical order. The list won twenty mandates, of which three were apportioned to United Serbia, and Vujić was not included in his party's delegation. (From 2000 to 2011, parliamentary mandates in Serbia were awarded to sponsoring parties or coalitions rather than to individual candidates, and it was common practice for the mandates to be distributed out of numerical order. Vujić could have been awarded a mandate notwithstanding his comparatively low list position, although in the event he was not.)

Serbia's electoral system was reformed in 2011, such that parliamentary mandates were awarded in numerical order to candidates on successful lists. Vujić was awarded the twenty-seventh position on the Socialist-led list and was elected when the list won forty-four mandates. The Socialist Party formed a coalition government with the Serbian Progressive Party after the election, and United Serbia provided support to the administration in the assembly. Vujić was re-elected in the 2014 and 2016 elections; the Socialists have remained in government throughout this time, and United Serbia has continued to support the ministry.

Vujić is currently a member of the assembly's committee on the economy, regional development, trade, tourism, and energy; a member of the committee on finance, state budget, and control of public spending; a deputy member of the committee on constitutional and legal issues and the committee on administrative, budgetary, mandate, and immunity issues; a member of a subcommittee for the consideration of reports on audits conducted by the state audit institution; a member of Serbia's delegation to the South-East European Cooperation Process Parliamentary Assembly; and a member of the parliamentary friendship groups with Austria, Bosnia and Herzegovina, Bulgaria, China, Greece, Russia, and Turkey.

He serves on the presidency of United Serbia.
