= Dubravka Kralj =

Serbian politician

- Дубравка Краљ

Member of the National Assembly of the Republic of Serbia
- In office 3 August 2020 – 6 February 2024

Personal details
- Born: 1994 (age 31–32) Zrenjanin, Vojvodina, Serbia, FR Yugoslavia
- Party: SPS
- Education: University of Novi Sad Faculty of Law
- Profession: Lawyer

Dubravka Kralj (Serbian Cyrillic: Дубравка Краљ; born 1994) is a Serbian politician. She served in the Serbian parliament from 2020 to 2024 as a member of the Socialist Party of Serbia (SPS).

== Early life and career ==
Kralj was born in Zrenjanin, Vojvodina, Republic of Serbia, in what was then the Federal Republic of Yugoslavia. She holds a bachelor's degree (2017) and a master's degree (2019) from the University of Novi Sad Faculty of Law, graduating with a 9.97 average for her bachelor's – the highest grade in her class – and a ten average for her master's. She interned in Novi Sad and was planning to practise law independently at the time of her election to the national assembly.

She married high-profile Serbian lawyer Stefan Jokić on 1 June 2024.

== Politician ==
=== Parliamentarian ===
Despite having little political experience, Kralj was given the third position on the Socialist Party's electoral list in the 2020 Serbian parliamentary election. This was tantamount to election, and she was indeed elected when the list won thirty-two mandates. During the campaign, she defended the Socialist Party as a genuine party of the left, responding to criticism that it had failed to uphold left-wing values when in power.

The Socialist Party continued its participation in a coalition government led by the Serbian Progressive Party (SNS) after the 2020 election, and Kralj supported the ministry in the assembly. During her first term, she was a member of the committee on constitutional and legislative issues; a deputy member of the judiciary committee, (Note: Formally known as the Committee on the Judiciary, Public Administration, and Local Self-Government.) the economy committee, (Note: Formally known as the Committee on the Economy, Regional Development, Trade, Tourism, and Energy.) the health and family committee, and the European Union–Serbia stabilization and association committee; a member of a special commission for the control of the execution of criminal sanctions; the head of Serbia's parliamentary friendship groups with the Comoros and Tunisia; and a member of the friendship groups with Egypt, Ethiopia, France, Hungary, Montenegro, Namibia, Russia, Slovenia, the countries of Sub-Saharan Africa, Turkey, the United Kingdom, and the United States of America. In her capacity as leader of the friendship group with Tunisia, she met Tunisian ambassador to Serbia Seyf-Allah Rejeb in April 2021.

She received the fifteenth position on the SPS's list in the 2022 parliamentary election and was elected to a second term when the list won thirty-one mandates. She served afterward a member of the judiciary committee and the committee on constitutional and legislative issues and was a deputy member of Serbia's delegation to the parliamentary dimension of the Central European Initiative. She remained the head of Serbia's parliamentary friendship group with Tunisia and was a member of forty-seven other friendship groups. (Note: She was a member of the parliamentary friendship groups with Argentina, Bosnia and Herzegovina, Cambodia, the Comoros, the Democratic Republic of the Congo, the Dominican Republic, Egypt, Estonia, Ethiopia, France, The Gambia, Germany, Ghana, Greece, Grenada, Guatemala, Guinea-Bissau, Guyana, Hungary, India, Italy, Japan, Kazakhstan, Kenya, Kyrgyzstan, Liechtenstein, Madagascar, Mauritius, Mexico, Morocco, Namibia, Portugal, Qatar, the Republic of Congo, Romania, Russia, Rwanda, Spain, Sri Lanka, the countries of Sub-Saharan Africa, Suriname, Trinidad and Tobago, Turkey, the United Arab Emirates, the United States of America, Zambia, and Zimbabwe.)

Kralj appeared in the twenty-eighth position on the SPS's list in the 2023 parliamentary election. The SPS alliance fell to eighteen seats, and she was not re-elected. Her term ended when the new assembly convened in February 2024.

=== Local politics ===
Kralj received the second position on the Socialist Party's list for the Zrenjanin city assembly in the 2020 Serbian local elections, which were held concurrently with that year's parliamentary election. She was elected when the list won eleven mandates and served for the term that followed. She did not seek re-election in 2024.
