= Slaviša Bulatović =

Serbian politician

Slaviša Bulatović (Serbian Cyrillic: Славиша Булатовић; born 4 July 1975) is a politician in Serbia. He has served in the National Assembly of Serbia since 2016 as a member of the Serbian Progressive Party.

== Early life and career ==
Bulatović was born in Vranje, in what was then the Socialist Republic of Serbia in the Socialist Federal Republic of Yugoslavia. He holds a Bachelor of Laws degree and has worked in human resources. He lives in the municipality of Vranjska Banja.

== Politician ==
=== Municipal and regional politics ===
Bulatović began his political career at the local level, serving in the Vranjska Banja municipal assembly. He received the lead position on the electoral list of the United Regions of Serbia (URS) in the 2012 Serbian local elections and was appointed to the municipal council (i.e., the executive branch of the municipal government) when the URS joined a municipal coalition government after the election. The URS subsequently dissolved, and Bulatović joined the Progressive Party. He was chosen as leader of the Progressive board in Vranje in July 2015.

He was appointed as governor of the Pčinja administrative district in December 2014 and held this position until his election to the national assembly in 2016. Bulatović called for Albanians in the region to become better integrated into state institutions in March 2016, noting that the existing number of Albanian state employees was very low.

He received the second position on the Progressive Party's list for the Vranje city assembly in the 2020 Serbian local elections and elected to the local assembly when the list won a majority victory with thirty-eight out of sixty-five mandates.

=== Member of the National Assembly ===
Bulatović received the fifty-third position on the Progressive Party's Aleksandar Vučić – Serbia Is Winning electoral list in the 2016 Serbian parliamentary election and was elected when the list won a majority victory with 131 out of 250 mandates. During the 2016–20 parliament, he was a member of the committee on the judiciary, public administration, and local self-government; a deputy member of the committee on constitutional and legislative issues; a deputy member of the committee on finance, state budget, and control of public spending; a deputy member of the agriculture, forestry, and water management committee; and a member of the parliamentary friendship groups with Austria, Azerbaijan, Belarus, Belgium, Bosnia and Herzegovina, Brazil, Bulgaria, Canada, China, Croatia, Cuba, Germany, Greece, Hungary, Italy, Kazakhstan, Montenegro, North Macedonia, Norway, Romania, Slovenia, Spain, Sweden, and Switzerland.

He was given the ninety-first position on the Progressive Party's Aleksandar Vučić — For Our Children list in the 2020 election and was elected to a second term at the national level when the list won a landslide majority with 188 mandates. He is now a member of the committee on Kosovo-Metohija and the security services control committee, and a member of the parliamentary friendship groups with the Bahamas, Botswana, Brazil, Cameroon, the Central African Republic, Comoros, the Dominican Republic, Ecuador, Equatorial Guinea, Eritrea, Grenada, Guinea-Bissau, Jamaica, Kyrgyzstan, Laos, Liberia, Madagascar, Mali, Mauritius, Montenegro, Mozambique, Nauru, Nicaragua, Nigeria, Palau, Papua New Guinea, Paraguay, the Republic of Congo, Saint Vincent and the Grenadines, Sao Tome and Principe, the Solomon Islands, South Sudan, Sri Lanka, Sudan, Suriname, Togo, Trinidad and Tobago, the United Arab Emirates, Uruguay, and Uzbekistan.
