= Ana Miljanić =

Serbian politician and athlete

Ana Miljanić (Serbian Cyrillic: Ана Миљанић; born 1982) is a politician and athlete in Serbia. She has served in the National Assembly of Serbia since 2020 as a member of the Serbian Progressive Party.

== Athlete ==
Miljanić was born in Požarevac, in what was then the Socialist Republic of Serbia in the Socialist Federal Republic of Yugoslavia. She is a professor of physical education and has been a member of Serbia's national basketball team.

== Politician ==
=== Municipal politics ===
Miljanić was appointed to Požarevac's municipal council (i.e., the executive branch of the city government) in 2016 as a non-partisan representative with responsibility for sports, youth, and tourism. She later joined the Progressive Party and served on council until 2020. In August 2020, she was recognized for her role in organizing the Tour de Serbie.

=== Parliamentarian ===
Miljanić received the 154th position on the Progressive Party's Aleksandar Vučić — For Our Children electoral list in the 2020 Serbian parliamentary election and was elected when the list won a landslide majority with 188 out of 250 mandates. She is now a member of the European integration committee; a deputy member of the health and family committee, the culture and information committee, and the committee on labour, social issues, social inclusion, and poverty reduction; and a member of Serbia's parliamentary friendship groups with Australia, Austria, Belgium, Bosnia and Herzegovina, Canada, China, Cuba, Cyprus, France, Germany, Greece, Hungary, Italy, Japan, Norway, Portugal, Russia, Slovenia, Spain, Sweden, Switzerland, Turkey, the United Arab Emirates, the United Kingdom, and the United States of America.
