= Dušan Stojiljković =

Serbian politician

- Душан Стојиљковић

Member of the National Assembly of the Republic of Serbia
- Incumbent
- Assumed office 1 August 2022

Member of the City Assembly of Belgrade
- In office 11 June 2022 – 16 June 2022

Personal details
- Party: SSZ (until 2022); SNS (2023–present)

Dušan Stojiljković (Serbian Cyrillic: Душан Стојиљковић; born 1982) is a Serbian politician. He has served in Serbia's national assembly since 2022. Previously a member of the far-right Serbian Party Oathkeepers (SSZ), he joined the Serbian Progressive Party (SNS) in February 2023.

== Private career ==
Stojiljković is a graduated manager. He lives in the Belgrade municipality of Rakovica.

== Politician ==
Stojiljković appeared in the third position on the SSZ's electoral list in the 2020 Serbian parliamentary election. The list did not cross the electoral threshold to win representation in the national assembly. He also appeared in the tenth position on the party's list for the Rakovica municipal assembly in the concurrent 2020 local elections and was not elected when list won two seats.

=== Parliamentarian ===
Stojiljković again appeared in the third position on the SSZ's list in the 2022 parliamentary election and was this time elected when the list won ten mandates. The Serbian Progressive Party and its allies won the election, and the SSZ served in opposition. While he was a SSZ delegate, Stojiljković was a deputy member of the finance committee. (Note: Formally known as the Committee on Finance, State Budget, and Control of Public Spending.)

Stojiljković also received the third position on the SSZ's list for the Belgrade city assembly in the 2022 city election, which was held concurrently with the parliamentary vote. He was elected when the list won four seats but resigned soon after the assembly convened.

Several SSZ members, including Stojiljković, left the party on 24 October 2022. In their resignation letter, they said they could not work with party spokesperson Milica Đurđević Stamenkovski (whom they described as "the main star of the media that is under the open control of the Western power centers") nor stand "side by side" with the leaders of the People's Party (Narodna), Dveri, and the New Democratic Party of Serbia (NDSS). Stojiljković lost his committee assignment after leaving the party. He and a number of other former SSZ members joined the Progressives in February 2023.

In his first assembly term, Stojiljković was a member of the parliamentary friendship groups with Greece, the Holy See, Iceland, Italy, and Slovenia.

He was given the eighty-fourth position on the SNS's Serbia Must Not Stop list in the 2023 parliamentary election and was re-elected when the list won a majority victory with 129 out of 250 seats. He does not hold any committee assignments.

Stojiljković appeared in the thirty-fourth position on the SNS coalition's list for the Rakovica municipal assembly in the 2024 Serbian local elections. The list won a majority victory with thirty out of fifty seats. He was not initially elected but received a mandate on 14 August 2024 to replace another party member who had resigned.
