= Zsombor Újvári =

Serbian politician

- Újvári Zsombor

Member of the National Assembly of the Republic of Serbia
- In office 1 August 2022 – 6 February 2024

Personal details
- Born: 1982 (age 43–44)
- Party: VMSZ

Zsombor Újvári (Serbian Cyrillic: Жомбор Ујвари, romanized: Žombor Ujvari; born 1982) is a Serbian politician from the country's Hungarian community. He was a member of the Serbian parliament from 2022 to 2024 and in 2024 became the president (i.e., speaker) of the Kanjiža municipal assembly. Újvári is a member of the Alliance of Vojvodina Hungarians (VMSZ).

== Early life and private career ==
Újvári attended primary school in Kanjiža, completed high school and higher electrical engineer training in Subotica, and graduated from the "Mihajlo Pupin" Technical Faculty in Zrenjanin in 2017 with certification as a master information technology engineer. He has been employed in the public sector since 2012 and has worked for Komunalac in Kanjiža as a clerk for personnel records and information technology.

== Politician ==
Újvári appeared in the sixth position on the VMSZ's electoral list for the Kanjiža municipal assembly in the 2020 Serbian local elections and was elected when the list won a landslide majority victory with twenty out of twenty-nine seats. After the election, he was appointed to the municipal council (i.e., the executive branch of the municipal government) with responsibility for tourism and information.

He received the fourth position on the VMSZ's list in the 2022 Serbian parliamentary election and was elected to the national assembly when the list won five mandates. He resigned from the Kanjiža municipal council on 22 July 2022, as he could not hold a dual mandate as a parliamentarian and a member of a local executive.

During his parliamentary term, Újvari was member of the labour committee, (Note: Formally known as the Committee on Labour, Social Issues, Social Inclusion, and Poverty Reduction.) the committee on the rights of the child, and the European Union–Serbia stabilization and association committee; a deputy member of the judiciary committee, (Note: Formally known as the Committee on the Judiciary, Public Administration, and Local Self-Government.) the agriculture committee, (Note: Formally known as the Agriculture, Forestry, and Water Management Committee.) and the European integration committee; and a member of the parliamentary friendship groups with Italy, Romania, and Turkey. During this time, the VMSZ supported Serbia's government led by the Serbian Progressive Party (SNS) in the assembly.

Újvari appeared in the twenty-ninth position on the VMSZ's list in the 2023 parliamentary election. Re-election from this position was not a realistic prospect, and he was not elected when the list won six seats; his term ended when the new assembly convened in February 2024. He later received the second position on the VMSZ's list for Kanjiža in the 2024 Serbian local elections and was re-elected to that body when the list won nineteen seats. When the new local assembly convened on 10 July 2024, he was chosen as assembly president.
