= Bojana Bukumirović =

Serbian politician

- Бојана Букумировић

Member of the National Assembly of the Republic of Serbia
- In office 1 August 2022 – 6 February 2024

Member of the City Assembly of Belgrade
- In office 11 June 2022 – 6 September 2022

Personal details
- Party: SSZ

Bojana Bukumirović (Serbian Cyrillic: Бојана Букумировић; born 1981) is a Serbian politician. She served in the National Assembly of Serbia from 2022 to 2023 as a member of the far-right Serbian Party Oathkeepers (SSZ) and was briefly the leader of the party's group in the City Assembly of Belgrade.

== Private career ==
Bukumirović is from the Kaluđerica neighbourhood in the Belgrade municipality of Grocka. She is a graduated economist.

== Politician ==
Bukumirović received the thirteenth position on the SSZ's list in the 2018 Belgrade city assembly election. The list did not cross the electoral threshold to win representation in the assembly.

She was given the twelfth position on the party's list in the 2020 parliamentary election, which also failed to cross the threshold. In the concurrent 2020 Serbian local elections, she appeared in the lead position on the party's list for the Grocka municipal assembly and was elected when the list won a single mandate.

=== Parliamentarian ===
Bukumirović appeared in the fifth position on the SSZ's list in the 2022 parliamentary election and was elected when the list won ten mandates. The Serbian Progressive Party (SNS) and its allies won the election, and the SSZ served afterward in opposition. During her assembly term, Bukumirović was a member of the finance committee (Note: Formally known as the Committee on Finance, State Budget, and Control of Public Spending.) and the committee on the rights of the child, a deputy member of the health and family committee and the committee on constitutional and legislative issues, a member of Serbia's delegation to the parliamentary dimension of the Central European Initiative, and a member of Serbia's parliamentary friendship groups with the Caribbean countries, (Note: Antigua and Barbuda, Barbados, Belize, Dominica, Haiti, Saint Kitts and Nevis, and Saint Lucia.) the Central African Republic, the Democratic Republic of the Congo, Egypt, Eritrea, Ghana, Guinea-Bissau, Indonesia, Jordan, Madagascar, the State of Palestine, and Uganda.

She also received the fourth position on the SSZ's list for the Belgrade assembly in the 2022 city election, which was held concurrently with the parliamentary vote, and was elected when the list won four mandates. As at the republic level, the SNS and its allies won the election, and the SSZ served in opposition. Bukumirović was initially the leader of the party's assembly group but resigned her seat on 6 September 2022.

The SSZ formed a coalition with Dveri for the 2023 Serbian parliamentary election and Bukumirović appeared in the thirteen position on their combined list. The list did not cross the electoral threshold, and her term ended when the new assembly convened in February 2024. She also appeared in the fifth position on a combined SSZ–Dveri list in the concurrent 2023 Belgrade city assembly election. This list, too, failed to cross the threshold.

Bukumirović was recognized by the name "Bojana Palibrk Todorović" for part of her assembly term, although she appeared on the ballot in the 2023 elections as "Bojana Bukumirović."
