= Uglješa Marković =

Serbian politician

- Угљеша Марковић

Member of the National Assembly of the Republic of Serbia
- Incumbent
- Assumed office 3 August 2020

Substitute Member of the Parliamentary Assembly of the Council of Europe
- In office 23 January 2023 – 14 April 2024

Personal details
- Born: 18 January 1991 (age 35) Belgrade, Serbia, SFR Yugoslavia
- Party: SPS

Uglješa Marković (Serbian Cyrillic: Угљеша Марковић; born 18 January 1991) is a Serbian politician. He has served in the Serbian national assembly since 2020 as a member of the Socialist Party of Serbia (SPS).

== Early life and private career ==
Marković was born in Belgrade, Republic of Serbia, in what was then the Socialist Federal Republic of Yugoslavia. He was raised in the city and holds a bachelor's degree and a master's degree in economics.

== Politician ==
=== Socialist Party activist ===
Marković was raised in a family of SPS supporters and became a party member in 2013. He was elected as president of the Socialist Youth of Serbia on 17 December 2017.

In a 2019 interview, he was asked for his opinion of SPS founder and former Serbian president Slobodan Milošević. Marković described Milošević as a leader who emerged "at the wrong time, in the wrong place," though adding that his legacy included two landmark accomplishments for Serbia: the Dayton Agreement and United Nations Security Council Resolution 1244.

=== Municipal politics ===
Marković received the eighth position on the Socialist Party's electoral list for the Stari Grad municipal assembly in the 2016 Serbian local elections. The list won four seats; he was not immediately elected but received a mandate on 29 September 2016 as the replacement for another party member. He was promoted to the fifth position on the SPS list in the 2020 local elections and was re-elected when the list won six mandates. During his time in the municipal assembly, he served on the committee for the implementation of Stari Grad's youth policy. He was not a candidate in the 2024 Serbian local elections.

=== Parliamentarian ===
Marković was given the fourth position on the Socialist Party's list in the 2020 Serbian parliamentary election. This was tantamount to election, and he was indeed elected when the list won thirty-two mandates. During the campaign, he highlighted the importance of Serbia's public health system established in the socialist era. The SPS continued its participation in a coalition government led by the Serbian Progressive Party (SNS) after the election, and Marković supported the administration in the assembly.

In his first term, Marković was a member of the administrative committee (Note: Formally known as the Committee on Administrative, Budgetary, Mandate, and Immunity Issues.) and the economy committee; (Note: Formally known as the Committee on Economy, Regional Development, Trade, Tourism, and Energy.) a deputy member of the foreign affairs committee, the finance committee, (Note: Formally known as the Committee on Finance, State Budget, and Control of Public Spending.) and the spatial planning committee; (Note: Formally known as the Committee on Spatial Planning, Transport, Infrastructure, and Telecommunications.) the head of Serbia's parliamentary friendship groups with Slovakia and Suriname; and a member of the friendship groups with Albania, Bosnia and Herzegovina, Bulgaria, Burundi, Ghana, the Holy See, Malta, the Netherlands, Romania, Sierra Leone, Sweden, and Tunisia.

He was given the third position on the Socialist Party's list in the 2022 parliamentary election and was re-elected when the list won thirty-one seats. He was promoted to chair of the spatial planning committee in the parliament that followed and was also a member of the foreign affairs committee, a deputy member of the economy committee and the security services control committee, again the leader of Serbia's parliamentary friendship group with Suriname, and a member of the friendship groups with Belarus, Bosnia and Herzegovina, Bulgaria, the Caribbean countries, (Note: Antigua and Barbuda, Barbados, Belize, Dominica, Haiti, St. Kitts and Nevis, and St. Lucia.) China, Egypt, France, Ireland, Kuwait, Liechtenstein, New Zealand and the Pacific Island countries, (Note: Vanuatu, Tuvalu, Fiji, Nauru, Palau, Papua New Guinea, and the Solomon Islands.) Russia, Slovenia, Trinidad and Tobago, and the United Arab Emirates. He was briefly a deputy member of Serbia's delegation to the North Atlantic Treaty Organization (NATO) parliamentary assembly, where Serbia has observer status.

Marković received the sixteenth position on the SPS's list in the 2023 parliamentary election and was elected to a third term when the list won eighteen mandates. He currently serves as deputy leader of the Socialist Party's parliamentary group and is the chair of the spatial planning committee, a deputy member of the foreign affairs committee and the security services control committee, a member of the working group for the improvement of the electoral process, the head of Serbia's parliamentary friendship group with the Comoros, and a member of the friendship groups with Bahrain, Bosnia and Herzegovina, Bulgaria, China, Cuba, Greece, Hungary, Mali, Russia, and South Korea, as well as the group with Australia, New Zealand, and the Pacific Island countries.

In June 2024, Marković and Snežana Paunović, Serbia's delegates to a conference of the Berlin Process in Montenegro, walked out due to what they described as unjustified attacks against Serbia and its president Aleksandar Vučić.

He was elected as spokesperson of the SPS on 17 July 2024.

=== Council of Europe ===
Marković was a substitute member of Serbia's delegation to the Parliamentary Assembly of the Council of Europe (PACE) from January 2023 to April 2024. He served with the Socialists, Democrats and Greens Group and was an alternate member of the committee on social affairs, health, and sustainable development.
