= Marko Mladenović =

Serbian politician

Marko Mladenović (Serbian Cyrillic: Марко Младеновић; born 15.12.1990.) is a politician in Serbia. He has served in the National Assembly of Serbia since 2020 as a member of the Serbian Progressive Party.

== Private career ==
Mladenović was born in the village of Jabuka, Pančevo, in the province of Vojvodina, Serbia, in what was then the Socialist Federal Republic of Yugoslavia. He has a master's degree as an environmental protection engineer and has been a member of Progressive Party's Academy of Young Leaders program.

== Politician ==
=== Municipal politics ===
Mladenović received the sixteenth position on the Progressive Party's electoral list for the Pančevo city assembly in the 2016 Serbian local elections and was elected when the list won a majority victory with thirty-nine out of seventy seats. He was promoted to the fourth position in the 2020 local elections and was re-elected when the list won forty-seven mandates.

=== Parliamentarian ===
Mladenović received the 170th position on the Progressive Party's Aleksandar Vučić — For Our Children list in the 2020 Serbian parliamentary election and was elected when the list won a landslide majority with 188 out of 250 mandates. He is a member of the assembly's environmental protection committee, a deputy member of the committee on constitutional and legislative issues and the committee on the diaspora and Serbs in the region, the leader of Serbia's parliamentary friendship group with Djibouti, and a member of the parliamentary friendship groups with Bosnia and Herzegovina, Canada, China, Cuba, France, Germany, Hungary, India, North Macedonia, Norway, Portugal, Russia, Slovenia, Spain, Switzerland, and the United States of America.
