= Dragana Miljanić =

Serbian politician

- Драгана миљанић

Member of the National Assembly of the Republic of Serbia
- In office 1 August 2022 – 6 February 2024

Personal details
- Born: 1978 (age 47–48)
- Party: SSZ

Dragana Miljanić (Serbian Cyrillic: Драгана миљанић; born 1978) is a Serbian politician. She served in the Serbian parliament from 2022 to 2024 as a member of the far-right Serbian Party Oathkeepers (SSZ).

== Private career ==
Miljanić is an economist from the Belgrade municipality of Zvezdara. She has expounded right-wing viewpoints on various subjects in articles for Serbia's Novi Standard journal, among other things repeating MAGA conspiracy theories about Peanut the Squirrel and promoting a natalist definition of womanhood while condemning radical feminism and gender variance.

== Politician ==
Miljanić received the eighth position on the SSZ's electoral list in the 2020 Serbian parliamentary election. The list did not cross the electoral threshold for assembly representation.

=== Parliamentarian ===
Miljanić appeared in the tenth position on the SSZ's list in the 2022 parliamentary election and was elected when the list won exactly ten seats. The Serbian Progressive Party (SNS) and its allies won the election, and the SSZ served in opposition. During her parliamentary term, Miljanić was a member of the education committee (Note: Formally known as the Committee on Education, Science, Technological Development, and the Information Society.) and the culture and information committee; a deputy member of the defence and internal affairs committee, the administrative committee, (Note: Formally known as the Committee on Administrative, Budgetary, Mandate, and Immunity Issues.) and the European Union–Serbia stabilization and association committee; a deputy member of Serbia's delegation to the South-East European Cooperation Process parliamentary assembly; and a member of Serbia's parliamentary friendship groups with the Czech Republic, the Holy See, Hungary, and Portugal.

In a May 2023 assembly debate, Miljanić accused the Progressives of abandoning the predominantly Serb communities in the north of Kosovo to the Priština authorities. She called for Serbia to end negotiations with Albin Kurti's government, declare Kosovo to be occupied territory, and return the question of its status to the United Nations.

The Oathkeepers contested the 2023 parliamentary election in an alliance with Dveri, and Miljanić received the fifth position on their combined list, which did not cross the electoral threshold. Her term ended when the new assembly convened in February 2024.

Dveri leader Boško Obradović later said that his party's alliance with the Oathkeepers had been a mistake. Miljanić responded by accusing Obradović of trying to restore his ties to the "pro-Brussels opposition," referring to Dveri's previous association with pro-western parties in the Alliance for Serbia.

=== City politics in Belgrade ===
Miljanić appeared in the thirty-fifth position on the SSZ's list in the 2022 Belgrade city assembly election and was not elected when the list won four seats. She later received the seventh position on a combined SSZ–Dveri list in the 2023 city election; this list did not cross the electoral threshold.
