= Stanislava Janošević =

Serbian politician

Stanislava Janošević (Serbian Cyrillic: Станислава Јаношевић; born 1986) is a politician in Serbia. She has served in the National Assembly of Serbia since 2016 as a member of the Serbian Progressive Party.

== Early life and career ==
Janošević was born in 1986. He has a Master of Economics degree and lives in Zrenjanin, Vojvodina.

== Politician ==
Janoševič received the 229th position on the Progressive Party's Aleksandar Vučić — Future We Believe In electoral list for the 2014 Serbian parliamentary election. This was too low a position for election to be a realistic prospect, and although the Progressives won a landslide victory with 158 out of 250 mandates she was not elected and did not serve in the following parliament.

She was promoted to the 132nd position on the successor Aleksandar Vučić – Serbia Is Winning list for the 2016 election. and narrowly missed direct election when the list won a majority victory with 131 out of 250 seats. When Vučić resigned from the assembly to continue serving as prime minister, she was able to assume his vacated mandate; her term formally started on 10 August 2016. During the 2016–20 parliament, she was a member of the committee on the economy, regional development, trade, tourism, and energy; a deputy member of the health and family committee and the committee on human and minority rights and gender equality; and a member of the parliamentary friendship groups with Austria, China, Cyprus, France, Germany, Italy, Japan, the Netherlands, Russia, Spain, and the United Arab Emirates.

Janošević received the 158th position on the Progressive Party's Aleksandar Vučić — For Our Children list in the 2020 election and was elected for a second term when the list won a landslide victory with 188 mandates. She is now a member of the European integration committee and the agriculture, forestry, and water management committee; a deputy member of the environmental protection committee; and a member of the parliamentary friendship groups with Austria, Burundi, Canada, China, Cyprus, the Czech Republic, Finland, France, Germany, Ghana, Hungary, Japan, Kazakhstan, Lesotho, Russia, Spain, Ukraine, the United Arab Emirates, and the United States of America.

She also became a substitute member of Serbia's delegation to the Parliamentary Assembly of the Council of Europe (PACE) in January 2021. She is an alternate member of the committee on legal affairs and human rights, the committee on equality and non-discrimination, and the committee on migration, refugees, and displaced persons.
