= Tijana Davidovac =

Serbian politician

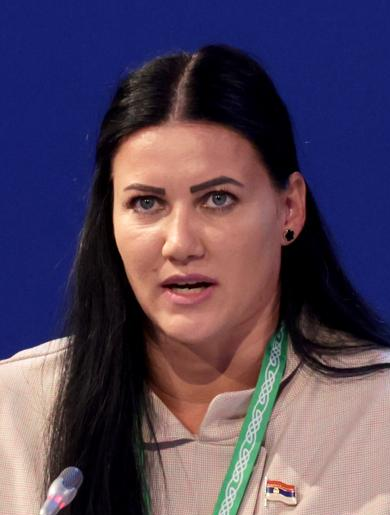
- Davidovac in 2024

Member of National Assembly
- Incumbent
- Assumed office 2016

Personal details
- Born: 1 December 1986 (age 39) Kragujevac, Socialist Federal Republic of Yugoslavia
- Party: Serbian Progressive Party
- Education: University of Kragujevac

Tijana Davidovac (Serbian Cyrillic: Тијана Давидовац; born 1986) is a Serbian politician. She has served in the National Assembly of Serbia since 2016 as a member of the Serbian Progressive Party.

== Early life and career ==
Davidovac finished elementary school in Lajkovac and high school in Valjevo, and now lives in the Belgrade municipality of Lazarevac. She is an economist.

== Politician ==
=== Municipal politics ===
Davidovac was given the thirty-ninth position on the Progressive Party's electoral list for the Lazarevac municipal assembly in the 2016 Serbian local elections. The list won twenty-seven mandates, and she was not elected.

=== Parliamentarian ===
Davidovac received the sixty-third position on the Progressive Party's Aleksandar Vučić – Serbia Is Winning electoral list in the 2016 Serbian parliamentary election and was elected when the list won a majority victory with 131 out of 250 mandates. During the 2016–20 parliament, she was a member of the foreign affairs committee and the committee on agriculture, forestry, and water management; a deputy member of the committee on human and minority rights and gender equality; a member of Serbia's delegation in the Parliamentary Assembly of the Mediterranean; the leader of Serbia's parliamentary friendship group with Finland; and a member of the parliamentary friendship groups with Australia, Belarus, China, Cuba, Egypt, France, Greece, India, Iran, Iraq, Italy, Kazakhstan, Mexico, Morocco, Portugal, Russia, Spain, Switzerland, the United Kingdom, and the United States of America.

She received the eighty-first position on the Progressive Party's Aleksandar Vučić — For Our Children coalition list in the 2020 Serbian parliamentary election and was elected to a second term when the list won a landslide majority with 188 mandates. She is still a member of the agriculture committee, a member of Serbia's delegation to the Parliamentary Assembly of the Mediterranean, and the leader of Serbia's friendship group with Finland. Davidovac is also a deputy member of the foreign affairs committee and the committee on the rights of the child, and a member of the friendship groups with Angola, Argentina, Armenia, Australia, Austria, Azerbaijan, Brazil, Bulgaria, China, Cuba, Cyprus, Egypt, Estonia, Ethiopia, Fiji, France, Germany, Ghana, Greece, Hungary, India, Iran, Iraq, Israel, Italy, Ireland, Japan, Kazakhstan, Latvia, Malawi, Malta, Mexico, Moldova, Morocco, Myanmar, the Netherlands, North Macedonia, Norway, Palestine, the Philippines, Poland, Portugal, Qatar, Russia, South Korea, Spain, Sweden, Switzerland, Tunisia, Turkey, the United Arab Emirates, the United Kingdom, the United States of America, Venezuela, and Vietnam.
