= Jelena Obradović =

Serbian politician

Jelena Obradović (Serbian Cyrillic: Јелена Обрадовић; born 19 January 1982) is a politician in Serbia. She has served in the National Assembly of Serbia since 2020 as a member of the Serbian Progressive Party.

== Early life and career ==
Obradović was born in Kragujevac, in what was then the Socialist Republic of Serbia in the Socialist Federal Republic of Yugoslavia. She graduated from the University of Kragujevac Faculty of Natural Sciences and Mathematics and subsequently worked as a chemistry teacher in Kragujevac and Knić.

== Politician ==
=== Municipal politics ===
Obradović received the second position on the Progressive Party's electoral list for the Knić municipal assembly in the 2016 Serbian local elections and was elected when the list won sixteen out of thirty-three mandates. She was subsequently appointed as deputy mayor with responsibility for culture, science, education, and tourism on the municipal council (i.e., the executive branch of the municipal government). She was again given the second list position in the 2020 local elections and was re-elected when the Progressives and their allies won a majority victory with nineteen of twenty-five mandates in a reduced assembly.

=== Parliamentarian ===
Obradović was given the 184th position on the Progressive Party's Aleksandar Vučić — For Our Children list in the 2020 Serbian parliamentary election and was elected when the list won a landslide majority with 188 out of 250 mandates. She was subsequently identified as the first candidate from Knić ever to win election to the national assembly.

She is a member of the environmental protection committee and the committee on the rights of the child; a deputy member of the committee on education, science, technological development, and the information society; a member of the subcommittee on youth and sports; and a member of Serbia's parliamentary friendship groups with Austria, Belarus, Belgium, Bosnia and Herzegovina, Canada, China, Cyprus, Denmark, Finland, France, Germany, Greece, Italy, the Netherlands, Norway, Poland, Russia, Slovenia, Spain, Sweden, Switzerland, Turkey, Ukraine, and the United Kingdom.
