= Marko Bogdanović =

Serbian politician (born 1981)

Marko Bogdanović (Serbian Cyrillic: Марко Богдановић; born 1981) is a politician in Serbia. He was elected to the National Assembly of Serbia in the 2020 parliamentary election as a candidate of the Strength of Serbia Movement.

== Private career ==
Bogdanović is a surgeon. He lives in Belgrade.

== Politician ==
The Strength of Serbia Movement contested the 2020 parliamentary election in an alliance with the Serbian Progressive Party. Bogdanović received the eighty-fifth position on the Progressive Party's Aleksandar Vučić — For Our Children coalition list in the 2020 Serbian parliamentary election and was elected when the list won a landslide majority with 188 mandates.

He is a member of the health and family committee, a deputy member of the environmental protection committee and the committee on the diaspora and Serbs in the region, the leader of Serbia's parliamentary friendship group with Ireland, and a member of the parliamentary friendship groups with Angola, Argentina, Australia, Austria, Bahrain, Belgium, Bosnia and Herzegovina, Brazil, Bulgaria, Canada, China, Croatia, Cuba, Cyprus, the Czech Republic, Denmark, Egypt, Finland, France, Georgia, Germany, Greece, the Holy See, Hungary, Israel, Italy, Japan, Kazakhstan, Kuwait, Liechtenstein, Luxembourg, Malta, Mexico, Montenegro, the Netherlands, North Macedonia, Norway, Poland, Portugal, Qatar, Romania, Russia, Saudi Arabia, Slovakia, Slovenia, the Sovereign Order of Malta, Spain, Sweden, Switzerland, Tunisia, Turkey, Turkmenistan, Ukraine, the United Arab Emirates, the United Kingdom, the United States of America, and Venezuela.
