= Jasmina Karanac =

Serbian politician and journalist

Jasmina Karanac (Serbian Cyrillic: Јасмина Каранац; born June 10, 1967) is a journalist and politician in Serbia. A prominent figure on B92 television for many years, she has served in the National Assembly of Serbia since 2016 as a member of the Social Democratic Party of Serbia (SDPS).

== Early life and journalistic career ==
Karanac was born in Čačak, in what was then the Socialist Republic of Serbia in the Socialist Federal Republic of Yugoslavia. She is a graduate of the University of Belgrade Faculty of Agriculture.

Karanac worked for TV Čačak in the 1990s and hosted the program TV Parlament, which featured regular appearances by prominent opponents of Slobodan Milošević's administration. She joined B92 in August 2001 as a news editor and reporter, also producing documentaries on the deaths of Ivan Stambolić and Slavko Ćuruvija.

== Politician ==
The SDPS contested the 2016 Serbian parliamentary election as part of the Serbian Progressive Party's coalition Aleksandar Vučić – Serbia Is Winning electoral list. Karanac was nominated to the sixtieth position on the list. She initially identified as a non-partisan candidate aligned with the SDPS, although she officially joined the party at some point thereafter. She was elected when the list won a majority with 131 out of 250 seats.

In the 2016–20 assembly, Karanac was the chair of the committee on human and minority rights and gender equality; a member of the parliamentary environmental protection committee and the committee on spatial planning, transport, infrastructure, and telecommunications; a deputy member of the committee on the rights of the child; the head of Serbia's parliamentary friendship group with Iran; and a member of the parliamentary friendship groups with Azerbaijan, Canada, China, Croatia, Cuba, Denmark, France, Germany, Italy, Kazakhstan, Norway, Pakistan, Russia, Sweden, the United Arab Emirates, the United Kingdom, and the United States of America.

In early 2017, she was one of nine parliamentarians who took part in a working visit to America to study the country's political culture. In May of the same year, she was chosen as president of the SDPS's election staff for the upcoming municipal campaign in Belgrade.

She received the thirtieth position on the Progressive Party's Aleksandar Vučić — For Our Children electoral list for the 2020 Serbian parliamentary election and was returned for a second term when the list won a landslide victory with 188 mandates. She now serves on the environmental protection committee and the committee on the economy, regional development, trade, tourism, and energy; is a member of the European Union–Serbia stabilization and association committee; leads the parliamentary friendship groups with Iran and Saint Vincent and the Grenadines; and serves on the friendship groups with Algeria, Australia, China, Cyprus, France, Georgia, Germany, Greece, Israel, Italy, Kazakhstan, Mauritius, Morocco, Namibia, Portugal, Russia, Spain, Sweden, the United Kingdom, the United States of America, and Uzbekistan.
