= Milimir Vujadinović =

Serbian politician

- Born: 1979 (age 46–47); Mostar, Bosnia and Herzegovina
- Education: University of Novi Sad, Novi Sad, Serbia
- Occupation: Politician

Milimir Vujadinović (Serbian Cyrillic: Милимир Вујадиновић; born 1979) is a народни посланик in Serbia. He has served in the National Assembly of Serbia since 2016 as a member of the Serbian Progressive Party.

== Early life and career ==
Vujadinović was born in Mostar, in what was then the Socialist Republic of Bosnia and Herzegovina in the Socialist Federal Republic of Yugoslavia. He is a graduate of the University of Novi Sad's Faculty of Economics in Subotica, Vojvodina, where he still resides. He worked for Telus a.d. Belgrade in Subotica from 2007 to 2013.

== Political career ==
=== Municipal politics ===
Vujadinović received the thirteenth position on the Progressive Party's electoral list for the Subotica municipal assembly in the 2012 Serbian local elections and missed election when the list won eight mandates. He was subsequently appointed to the city council (i.e., the executive branch of the municipal government) in 2013 with responsibility for social protection. In this capacity, he managed the municipality's response to an increased number of refugees travelling through the area en route to Hungary. He met with a large group of refugees from Middle Eastern countries on this route in August 2015; in so doing, he said his intent was to guarantee the safety of refugees and ensure that life in the city would continue as normal.

=== Parliamentarian ===
Vujadinović received the sixty-seventh position on the Progressive Party's Aleksandar Vučić — Serbia is winning electoral list for the 2016 Serbian parliamentary election and was elected when the list won a majority victory with 131 out of 250 mandates. During the 2016–20 parliament, he was a member of the assembly's European integration committee; a deputy member of the defence and internal affairs committee, the committee on the diaspora and Serbs in the region, and the committee on the economy, regional development, trade, tourism, and energy; a deputy member of Serbia's delegation to the Parliamentary Assembly of the Organization for Security and Co-operation in Europe (OSCE PA); and a member of the parliamentary friendship groups with Albania, Bosnia and Herzegovina, China, Germany, Hungary, Russia, and the United States of America. He was also a leading member of a working group on migration monitoring in Subotica.

He received the seventy-eighth position on the Progressive Party's Aleksandar Vučić — For Our Children coalition list in the 2020 Serbian parliamentary election and was elected to a second term when the list won a landslide majority with 188 mandates. He is now the chair of the committee on the diaspora and Serbs in the region, a member of the security services control committee, a deputy member of Serbia's delegation to the OSCE PA, the leader of Serbia's parliamentary friendship group with Kyrgyzstan, and a member of the parliamentary friendship groups with Albania, Armenia, Azerbaijan, Belarus, Bosnia and Herzegovina, Cuba, France, Hungary, Kazakhstan, Montenegro, Russia, Spain, Tajikistan, Turkey, and the United States of America.

In December 2020, he congratulated the Serb community in Mostar for entering the local parliament following the first municipal elections in the city in twelve years, arguing that the unity of the community was the best way to achieve practical results.
