= Tomislav Janković =

Serbian politician

Tomislav Janković (Serbian Cyrillic: Томислав Јанковић; 11 May 1973) is a politician in Serbia. He has served in the local government of Sremska Mitrovica and was elected to the National Assembly of Serbia in the 2020 parliamentary election. Janković is a member of the Serbian Progressive Party.

== Early life and career ==
Janković was born in Belgrade, in what was then the Socialist Republic of Serbia in the Socialist Federal Republic of Yugoslavia. He was raised in the municipality of Mladenovac, worked for the telephone service Mobtel from 1998 to 2000, and was an employee of Pošta Srbije from 2001 to 2012. In 2015, he received a master's degree as an engineer of management from the University of Novi Sad's "Mihailo Pupin" Faculty of Technical Sciences in Zrenjanin. He now lives in the town of Mačvanska Mitrovica in Sremska Mitrovica, in the province of Vojvodina.

== Politician ==
=== Municipal politics ===
Janković was elected to the Sremska Mitrovica municipal assembly in the 2012 Serbian local elections on the electoral list of the Progressive Party and was subsequently chosen as the municipality's deputy mayor. He was elected again in the 2016 local elections and served as president (i.e., speaker) of the assembly for the next four years. He did not seek re-election at the local level in 2020.

=== Parliamentarian ===
Janković received the seventy-third position on the Progressive Party's Aleksandar Vučić — For Our Children coalition list in the 2020 Serbian parliamentary election and was elected when the list won a landslide majority with 188 mandates. He is a member of the assembly's environmental protection committee, a deputy member of the defence and internal affairs committee and the committee on the rights of the child, the head of Serbia's parliamentary friendship group with Laos, and a member of the parliamentary friendship groups with China, Russia, and Slovenia.
