= Milan Radin (politician) =

Serbian politician (born 1988)

- Милан Радин

Personal details
- Born: 1988 Belgrade, Yugoslavia

Milan Radin (Serbian: Милан Радин; born 1988) is a Serbian politician. He was elected to the National Assembly of Serbia in the 2020 Serbian parliamentary election. Radin is a member of the Serbian Progressive Party.

== Early life ==
Radin was born in Belgrade, in what was then the Socialist Republic of Serbia in the Socialist Federal Republic of Yugoslavia. He has a degree from the Faculty of European Legal and Political Science in Novi Sad and subsequently received a Master of Business Administration degree. He has been the executive director of Mala Mlekara and lives Novi Sad.

== Career ==
Radin has been a member of the Progressive Party's Youth Union. In 2018, he took part in a Progressive Party delegation to a meeting of the European People's Party in Athens, Greece.

Radin received the 74th position on the Progressive Party's electoral list for the Novi Sad municipal assembly in the 2012 Serbian local elections and did not return when the list won fifteen mandates. He was promoted to the 52nd position in the 2016 local elections and was not elected when the list won 38 seats.

Radin received the 88th position on the United Serbia coalition list of the Progressive Party in the 2020 Serbian parliamentary election and was elected when the list won a landslide majority with 188 mandates. He later became a member of the European integration committee; a deputy member of the committee on education, science, technological development, and the information society; a member of the subcommittee on the information society and digitalization; a substitute member of the Serbia's delegation to the Parliamentary Assembly of the Council of Europe; the leader of Serbia's parliamentary friendship group with South Africa; and a member of the parliamentary friendship groups with Argentina, Austria, Belgium, Brazil, Canada, China, Cuba, Cyprus, the Czech Republic, Denmark, Finland, France, Georgia, Germany, Greece, Hungary, Ireland, Israel, Italy, Japan, Malta, the Netherlands, North Macedonia, Norway, Poland, Russia, Slovakia, South Korea, Spain, Sweden, Switzerland, Turkey, the United Kingdom, and the United States of America.
