= Ana Beloica Martać =

Serbian politician

- Ана Белоица Мартаћ

Member of the National Assembly of the Republic of Serbia
- Incumbent
- Assumed office 3 August 2020

Personal details
- Born: 1992 (age 33–34)
- Party: SNS

Ana Beloica Martać (Serbian Cyrillic: Ана Белоица Мартаћ; born 1992), formerly known as Ana Beloica, is a Serbian politician. She has served in Serbia's national assembly since 2020 as a member of the Serbian Progressive Party (SNS).

== Private career ==
Beloica Martać is from Raška and has a master's degree in economics.

== Politician ==
Beloica Martać has been the vice-president of the Progressive Party's municipal board in Raška. She took part in the party's Academy of Young Leaders program in 2019.

=== Parliamentarian ===
Beloica Martać was one of several young SNS activists given a prominent position on the party's For Our Children electoral list in the 2020 Serbian parliamentary election, appearing in tenth place. This was tantamount to election, and she was indeed elected when the list won a landslide majority with 188 out of 250 mandates. During her first term, she was a member of the economy committee, (Note: Formally known as the Committee on the Economy, Regional Development, Trade, Tourism, and Energy.) a deputy member of the finance committee (Note: Formally known as the Committee on Finance, State Budget, and Control of Public Spending.) and the health and family committee, a member of Serbia's delegation to the Parliamentary Assembly of the Mediterranean, the leader of Serbia's parliamentary friendship group with The Gambia, and a member of the friendship groups with China, Cuba, Egypt, France, Germany, Greece, Italy, Japan, Russia, Spain, Switzerland, the United Arab Emirates, the United Kingdom, the United States of America, and Venezuela.

She received the forty-first position on the SNS's list in the 2022 parliamentary election and was re-elected when the list won a plurality victory with 120 seats. In the 2022–24 parliament, she was a member of the finance committee and the European integration committee, a deputy member of the defence and internal affairs committee and the committee on Kosovo–Metohija, a deputy member of Serbia's delegation to the Parliamentary Assembly of the Mediterranean, the leader of Serbia's parliamentary friendship group with the Caribbean countries, (Note: Antigua and Barbuda, Barbados, Belize, Dominica, Haiti, Saint Kitts and Nevis, and Saint Lucia.) and a member of the friendship groups with Brazil, China, Cuba, the Czech Republic, Egypt, Equatorial Guinea, France, The Gambia, Germany, Greece, Italy, the Maldives, Russia, Spain, Switzerland, Turkey, the United Kingdom, and the United States.

In the 2023 parliamentary election, she received the fifty-fifth spot on the SNS list and was elected to a third term when the party's alliance returned to majority status with 129 seats. She is now a member of the economy committee and the finance committee, once again a deputy member of Serbia's delegation to the Parliamentary Assembly of the Mediterranean, and a member of the parliamentary friendship groups with the Benelux, Brazil, China, Cuba, the Czech Republic, France, Germany, Greece, Hungary, Italy and the Holy See, Japan, Russia, the countries of Southeast Asia, (Note: Brunei Darussalam, Cambodia, Indonesia, Laos, Malaysia, Myanmar, the Philippines, Singapore, Thailand, and Vietnam.) Spain, Switzerland, the United Kingdom, and the United States.
