= Darko Laketić =

Medical doctor and politician in Serbia

Darko Laketić (Serbian Cyrillic: Дарко Лакетић; born 10 January 1975) is a medical doctor and politician in Serbia. He has served in the National Assembly of Serbia since 2014 as a member of the Serbian Progressive Party.

== Early life and career ==
Laketić was born in Kosovska Mitrovica, Kosovo, in what was then the Socialist Republic of Serbia in the Socialist Federal Republic of Yugoslavia. He graduated from the school of medicine at the University of Priština and has earned a master's degree (2005) and Ph.D. (2007) from the medical faculty at the University of Niš. Laketić has worked at the Dr Aleksa Savić general hospital in Prokuplje since 2000 and has been president of the Serbian Medical Association in Toplica District since 2010.

== Politician ==
=== Before 2014 ===
Laketić became president of the Progressive Party's municipal board in Prokuplje in 2011. He was given the lead position on the party's electoral list for the Prokuplje municipal assembly in the 2012 Serbian local elections and was elected when the list won twelve mandates, finishing second against the list of the Democratic Party.

He also received the 115th position on the Progressive Party's Let's Get Serbia Moving coalition list in the concurrent 2012 Serbian parliamentary election. The list won seventy-three mandates, and the Progressive Party subsequently became the dominant force in a new coalition government. Laketić was not elected to parliament, but he was appointed as an assistant minister of health in October 2013.

=== Parliamentarian ===
Laketić was promoted to the eighty-sixth position on the Progressive-led Aleksandar Vučić — Future We Believe In list in the 2014 parliamentary election and was elected when the list won a landslide victory with 158 out of 250 seats. He was re-elected to a second term in the 2016 election on the successor Aleksandar Vučić – Serbia Is Winning list, which won a second consecutive majority with 131 mandates.

Laketić was elected as chair of the parliamentary health and family committee on October 7, 2016. During the 2016–20 parliament, he was also a member of the committee on administrative, budget, mandate, and immunity issues; a member of Serbia's delegation to the South-East European Cooperation Process Parliamentary Assembly; the head of Serbia's parliamentary friendship groups with the Czech Republic and Kenya; and a member of the parliamentary friendship groups with Armenia, Belarus, Bosnia and Herzegovina, Brazil, Canada, China, Cuba, Cyprus, France, Germany, Greece, Indonesia, Iran, Iraq, Italy, Japan, Kazakhstan, Montenegro, Norway, Poland, Romania, Russia, Slovakia, Slovenia, Spain, Sweden, Switzerland, the United States of America, Venezuela, and the Sovereign Military Order of Malta. Laketić also chaired a special assembly commission to investigate the consequence of the North Atlantic Treaty Organization (NATO) 1999 bombing on the health of the citizens of Serbia, as well as the environment, with a special focus on the impact of depleted uranium projectiles. The commission concluded that children born in Serbia between 1999 and 2015 were "exposed to a toxic factor that caused them to be susceptible to malignant diseases."

He received the sixty-fourth position on the Progressive Party's Aleksandar Vučić — For Our Children coalition list in the 2020 Serbian parliamentary election and was elected to a third term in the assembly when the list won a landslide majority with 188 mandates. He remains the chair of the health committee, a member of the administrative committee, and the chair of Serbia's parliamentary friendship groups with the Czech Republic and Kenya. He is also now a member of Serbia's delegation to the parliamentary dimension of the Central European Initiative and a member of the parliamentary friendship groups with Cyprus, Bosnia and Herzegovina, France, Germany, Greece, and Montenegro.
