= Krsto Janjušević =

Serbian politician

Krsto Janjušević (Serbian Cyrillic: Крсто Јањушевић; born 23 August 1981) is a politician in Serbia. He has served in the National Assembly of Serbia since 2016 as a member of the Serbian Progressive Party.

== Early life and career ==
Janjušević was born in Priboj, in what was then the Socialist Republic of Serbia in the Socialist Federal Republic of Yugoslavia. He graduated from the University of Kragujevac Faculty of Technical Sciences in Čačak with a Bachelor of Engineering degree in Industrial Management.

== Politician ==
=== Municipal politics ===
Janjušević received the second position on the Progressive Party's Let's Get Priboj Moving electoral list for the Priboj municipal assembly in the 2012 Serbian local elections and was elected when the list won seven mandates. After the election, on 26 July 2012, he became the assistant to the mayor on local economic development and served in the role for the next four years. He was again given the second position on the Progressive list in the 2016 local elections and was re-elected when the list won a majority victory with twenty-two out of forty-one mandates. He served in the assembly for the next four years and did not seek re-election in 2020.

He was also appointed by Serbian president Aleksandar Vučić as trustee of the Progressive Party organization in Nova Varoš in September 2017, when the party's municipal board was temporarily dissolved.

=== Parliamentarian ===
Janjušević received the 175th position on the Progressive Party's Aleksandar Vučić — Future We Believe In list for the 2014 Serbian parliamentary election. The list won a majority victory with 158 out of 250 mandates; he was not elected and narrowly missed being awarded a mandate as the substitute for another Progressive Party member before the assembly dissolved two years later. He was promoted to the 110th position on the Progressive list for the 2016 election and was elected when the list won 131 mandates.

During the 2016–20 parliament, Janjušević was a member of the parliamentary committee on constitutional and legislative issues; a deputy member of the defence and internal affairs committee, the committee on the diaspora and Serbs in the region, the European integration committee, and the committee on spatial planning, transport, infrastructure, and telecommunications; the leader of Serbia's parliamentary friendship group with the State of Palestine; and a member of the friendship groups for Austria, Azerbaijan, Belarus, Belgium, China, the Czech Republic, Germany, Israel, Italy, Japan, Kazakhstan, Russia, Spain, Switzerland, the United Kingdom, and the United States of America.

He received the fifty-first position on the Progressive Party's Aleksandar Vučić — For Our Children list in the 2020 parliamentary election and was elected to a second term when the list won a landslide victory with 188 mandates. He is now a member of the committee on the economy, regional development, trade, tourism, and energy; a member of the committee on spatial planning, transport, infrastructure, and telecommunications; a deputy member of the defence and internal affairs committee; the leader of Serbia's parliamentary friendship group with Nigeria; and a member of the parliamentary friendship groups with Brazil, Chine, the Czech Republic, France, Germany, Greece, Israel, Italy, Montenegro, Russia, Slovenia, Switzerland, and the United States of America.
