= Nemanja Joksimović =

Serbian politician

Nemanja Joksimović (Serbian Cyrillic: Немања Јоксимовић; born 1990) is a politician in Serbia. He has served in the Assembly of the City of Belgrade since 2014 and was elected to the National Assembly of Serbia in the 2020 Serbian parliamentary election. Joksimović is a member of the Serbian Progressive Party.

== Private life ==
Joksimović has a master's degree in law.

== Politician ==
=== Municipal politics ===
Joksimović received the fifty-sixth position on the Progressive Party's electoral list for the municipal assembly of New Belgrade in the 2012 Serbian local elections. The list won eighteen mandates, and he was not elected.

He subsequently received the fifty-ninth position on the Progressive list for the city assembly in the 2014 Belgrade City Assembly election and was elected when the list won a majority victory with sixty-three out of 110 mandates. At twenty-four years of age, he was the youngest person (tied with two others) elected to the assembly. He was promoted to the fortieth position on the Progressive list in the 2018 Belgrade City Assembly election and was elected to a second term when the list won a second majority with sixty-four seats.

=== Parliamentarian ===
Joksimović received the 232nd position (out of 250) on the Progressive list in the 2014 Serbian parliamentary election and the 211th position in the 2016 parliamentary election. These positions were too low for election to be a realistic prospect, and indeed he was not elected on either occasion despite the Progressive Party list winning two consecutive majority victories.

He was promoted to the seventy-second position on the Progressive Party's Aleksandar Vučić — For Our Children coalition list in the 2020 Serbian parliamentary election and was elected when the list won a landslide majority with 188 mandates. He is now a member of the assembly's European Integration Committee; a deputy member of the foreign affairs committee and the committee on administrative, budgetary, mandate, and immunity issues; a member of the European Union–Serbia stabilization and association committee; the leader of Serbia's parliamentary friendship group with Portugal; and a member of the parliamentary friendship groups with Austria, China, France, Germany, Greece, Hungary, Iceland, Israel, Italy, Lebanon, Malta, Morocco, Russia, Turkey, the United Arab Emirates, the United Kingdom, and the United States of America.
