= Lepomir Ivković =

Serbian actor and politician

- Лепомир Ивковић

Member of the National Assembly of the Republic of Serbia
- Incumbent
- Assumed office 1 August 2022

Member of the City Assembly of Belgrade
- In office 9 May 2018 – 11 June 2022

Personal details
- Born: 18 February 1959 (age 67) Belgrade, PR Serbia, FPR Yugoslavia
- Party: Serbian Progressive Party

Lepomir Ivković (Serbian Cyrillic: Лепомир Ивковић; born 18 February 1959) is a Serbian actor and politician. He served in the Belgrade city assembly from 2018 to 2022 and has been a member of Serbia's national assembly since 2022. Ivković is a member of the Serbian Progressive Party (SNS).

== Early life and acting career ==
Ivković was born in Belgrade, in what was then the People's Republic of Serbia in the Federal People's Republic of Yugoslavia. He graduated from the Faculty of Dramatic Arts, where he studied under Milenko Maričić.

He has appeared in film, television, and stage roles since the 1970s, and his body of work includes Sedam sekretara SKOJ-a (1978), Smrt gospodje Ministarke (1992), and District 13: Ultimatum (2009). In 1985, he became a member of the National Theatre in Belgrade.

== Political activities ==
Ivković was a supporter of Serbian president Slobodan Milošević in the 1990s. In December 1996, amid large-scale protests against Milošević's rule in Belgrade and throughout the country, he was prominent in organizing a pro-Milošević counter-protest at the Terazije fountain.

He later joined the SNS and supported Aleksandar Vučić's candidacy in the 2017 Serbian presidential election. He appeared in the forty-sixth position on the party's electoral list in the 2018 Belgrade City Assembly election and was elected when the list won a majority victory with sixty-three out of 110 seats. He served for the next four years as a supporter of the city government.

=== Parliamentarian ===
Ivković was given the tenth position on the SNS's list in the 2022 Serbian parliamentary election and was elected when the list won a plurality victory with 120 out of 150 seats. In his first term, he was a member of the assembly's culture and information committee, a deputy member of the committee on the diaspora and Serbs in the region, the leader of Serbia's parliamentary friendship group with Mali, and a member of the friendship groups with Greece, Montenegro, and Slovenia.

He received the twenty-fifth position on the SNS's list in the 2023 parliamentary election and was re-elected when the list won a majority victory with 129 seats. He is now a member of the culture and information committee, the committee on human and minority rights and gender equality, and the parliamentary friendship group with Greece.
