= Jasmina Obradović =

Serbian politician

Jasmina Obradović (Serbian Cyrillic: Јасмина Обрадовић; born 29 January 1961) is a politician in Serbia. She has served in the National Assembly of Serbia since 2012 as a member of the Serbian Progressive Party.

== Private career ==
Obradović is an economist. She lives in Futog in the city of Novi Sad.

== Politician ==
=== Municipal politics ===
Obradović appeared in the sixth position on the Progressive Party's electoral list for the Novi Sad city assembly in the 2012 Serbian local elections and was elected when the list won fifteen mandates. The Progressives initially served in opposition but formed a new coalition government later in the year. Obradović supported the administration and did not seek re-election at the local level in 2016.

=== Parliamentarian ===
Obradović received the eighty-first position on the Progressive Party's Let's Get Serbia Moving electoral list in the 2012 Serbian parliamentary election. The list won seventy-three mandates, and she was not immediately elected. She was, however, able to take a seat in the assembly on 30 July 2012 as the replacement for another candidate further up the list. The Progressive Party formed a coalition government with the Socialist Party of Serbia and other parties after the election at the republic level, and Obradović served as part of its parliamentary majority.

She received the forty-fifth position on the Progressive Party's Aleksandar Vučić — Future We Believe In list for the 2014 parliamentary election and was re-elected when the list won a landslide victory with 158 out of 250 mandates. She then received the sixty-sixth position on the successor Aleksandar Vučić – Serbia Is Winning list in the 2016 election and was again returned when the list won 131 seats.

During the 2016–20 parliament, Obradović was a member of the assembly's defence and internal affairs committee, the cultural and information committee, and the agriculture, forestry, and water management committee; a deputy member of the committee on constitutional and legislative issues, the security services control committee, and the committee on labour, social issues, social inclusion, and poverty reduction; a deputy member of the European Union–Serbia stabilization and association parliamentary committee; the head of Serbia's parliamentary friendship group with Switzerland; and a member of the parliamentary friendship groups with Austria, Egypt, Finland, France, Germany, Ghana, Iran, Italy, Montenegro, Morocco, and the United States of America. She was also a substitute member in Serbia's delegation to the Parliamentary Assembly of the Council of Europe, where she caucused with the European People's Party group. She was appointed as a substitute member of the Committee on Culture, Science, Education and Media in 2016 and became a full member in 2017.

She received the eighty-third position on the Progressive Party's Aleksandar Vučić — For Our Children coalition list in the 2020 Serbian parliamentary election and was elected to a fourth term when the list won a landslide majority with 188 mandates. She is now a member of the defence committee; a deputy member of the security services committee; a member of Serbia's delegation to the Parliamentary Assembly of the Collective Security Treaty Organization; the head of Serbia's parliamentary friendship group with Switzerland; and a membership of the friendship groups with Iran and Russia.
