= Anna Öreg =

Serbian politician

- Ана Орег

Member of the National Assembly
- Incumbent
- Assumed office 1 August 2022
- President: Ana Brnabić (2024-present); Vladimir Orlić (2022-2024)

Personal details
- Born: 28 December 1985 (age 40) Novi Sad, SAP Vojvodina, SR Serbia, SFR Yugoslavia
- Party: PSG (2019–present)
- Occupation: Veterinarian, politician

Anna Öreg (Serbian Cyrillic: Ана Орег; born 28 December 1985) is a Serbian veterinarian and politician of Hungarian descent who has been a member of the National Assembly since 1 August 2022. She is a president of the Vojvodina branch of the Movement of Free Citizens (PSG) and also vice-president of PSG.

== Biography ==
Öreg was born to a Hungarian family on 28 December 1985 in Novi Sad, SAP Vojvodina, SR Serbia, SFR Yugoslavia. During her youth, she was engaged in show jumping. She graduated from the Faculty of Agriculture, majoring in veterinary medicine.

She gained practical knowledge in the profession at the veterinary clinic "Szögedi ló és kisállat ambulancia" in Hungary. Furthermore, she worked as a one-year trainee in the private veterinary clinic "NS Vet" in Novi Sad. After that, she was employed for two years at the "Nelt" company, in the newly opened pet division. She worked on the formation of a network of customers in the territory of Vojvodina. She obtained her licence by passing the professional exam in 2012. Since 2012, she is the owner of the private veterinary clinic "Dog House", where she deals with professional practice and professional training of graduated veterinarians.

=== Political career ===
She has been a member of the Movement of Free Citizens (PSG) since April 2019. She was elected as the president of the Vojvodina branch of PSG by a majority of votes on 27 September 2020.

In the 2022 general election, PSG contested as part of the United for the Victory of Serbia alliance and Öreg was elected MP. In the 2023 parliamentary elections, PSG contested as part of the Serbia against violence she was placed 15th on the ballot and was again elected MP.

== Personal life ==
She has one child.
