= Svetlana Milijić =

Serbian politician

Svetlana Milijić (Serbian Cyrillic: Светлана Милијић; born 1970) is a politician and administrator in Serbia. She was elected to the National Assembly of Serbia in the 2020 parliamentary election as a member of the Serbian Progressive Party.

== Private career ==
Milijić lives in Niš and has a master's degree as a pharmacist. She has served for several years as chair of the Niš branch of Serbia's Republic Health Insurance Fund; she was first appointed to the position in 2013 on an interim basis after a controversial decision to dismiss the previous director. In early 2020, she was responsible for overseeing the dispersal of emergency medical equipment to counter the COVID-19 pandemic.

== Politician ==
=== Parliamentarian ===
Milijić received the 158th position on the Progressive Party's Aleksandar Vučić – Serbia Is Winning electoral list in the 2016 Serbian parliamentary election. The list won 131 out of 250 mandates, and Milijić did not serve in the parliament that followed. She was promoted to the ninetieth position on the successor Aleksandar Vučić — For Our Children list in the 2020 election and was elected when the list won a landslide majority with 188 mandates. She is now a member of the health and family committee; a deputy member of the committee on finance, state budget, and control of public spending; a deputy member of the committee on education, science, technological development, and the information society; a member of the subcommittee on the information society and digitalization; and a member of the parliamentary friendship groups with Austria, Belarus, Bosnia and Herzegovina, China, Denmark, Greece, Hungary, Norway, Russia, Spain, Turkey, and the United Arab Emirates.

=== Municipal politics ===
Milijić received the lead position on the Progressive Party's list for the municipal assembly of Palilula, Niš in the 2020 Serbian municipal elections and was elected when the list won nineteen mandates.
