= Nikola Dragićević =

Serbian politician

- Никола Драгићевић

Member of the City Council of Belgrade
- Incumbent
- Assumed office 24 June 2024

Member of the National Assembly of the Republic of Serbia
- In office 1 August 2022 – 6 February 2024

Personal details
- Born: 8 November 1994 (age 31) Belgrade, Serbia, FR Yugoslavia
- Party: SSZ

Nikola Dragićević (Serbian Cyrillic: Никола Драгићевић; born 8 November 1994) is a Serbian politician. He served in the Serbian national assembly from 2022 to 2024 and has been a member of the Belgrade city council since June 2024. Dragićević is a member of the far-right Serbian Party Oathkeepers (SSZ).

== Private career ==
Dragićević was born in Belgrade, Serbia, in what was then the Federal Republic of Yugoslavia. He lives in the Belgrade municipality of Čukarica and was a graduate student in political science at the time of the 2022 Serbian parliamentary election.

== Politician ==
=== Early Years (2017–22) ===
Dragićević was the president of the Oathkeepers executive board in 2017. In that year, he took part in a party delegation to Moscow that signed a cooperation agreement with Vladimir Putin's United Russia party.

He appeared in the twelfth position on the SSZ's electoral list in the 2018 Belgrade city assembly election. The list did not cross the electoral threshold for assembly representation. He later appeared in the fourth position on the party's list in the 2020 parliamentary election and the fifteenth position (out of fifteen) on its list for the Čukarica municipal assembly in the concurrent 2020 Serbian local elections. The party again fell below the threshold in both contests.

=== Parliamentarian (2022–24) ===
Dragićević once again received the fourth position on the SSZ list in the 2022 parliamentary election and was this time elected when the list won ten seats. The Serbian Progressive Party (SNS) and its allies won the election, and the SSZ served in opposition for the term that followed. Dragićević was deputy leader of his party's assembly group, as well as being a member of the defence and internal affairs committee, the administrative committee, (Note: Formally known as the Committee on Administrative, Budgetary, Mandate, and Immunity Issues.) and the security services control committee; a deputy member of the education committee, (Note: Formally known as the Committee on Education, Science, Technological Development and the Information Society.) the committee on Kosovo and Metohija, and the culture and information committee; a member of Serbia's delegation to the Inter-Parliamentary Union assembly; the leader of Serbia's parliamentary friendship group with Vietnam; and a member of the friendship groups with Angola, Azerbaijan, Bahrain, Belarus, Ethiopia, Iraq, Israel, Japan, Kyrgyzstan, Myanmar, Russia, Rwanda, South Africa, Syria, and Tajikistan.

He was the SSZ's representative on the Belgrade election commission for the 2022 city assembly election, which was held concurrently with the parliamentary election. In the aftermath of the vote, he rejected calls from the opposition United for the Victory of Serbia and We Must (Moramo) coalitions for repeat voting in certain areas. The opposition parties accused him of acting at the behest of the SNS, a charge that he denied. Dragićević himself appeared in the largely ceremonial 110th and final position on the SSZ's list for the city assembly. Election from this position was a mathematical impossibility, and he was not elected when the list won four mandates.

The SSZ formed a new alliance with Dveri prior to the 2023 Serbian parliamentary election, and Dragićević appeared in the seventh position on their combined list. The list did not cross the electoral threshold, and his term ended when the new assembly convened in early 2024. He also appeared in the third position on a SSZ–Dveri list in the 2023 Belgrade city election; this list too failed to cross the threshold.

The SSZ–Dveri alliance broke down following the 2023 vote, and the SSZ joined the coalition around the Progressive Party prior to the 2024 Serbian local elections. The SNS's list in Čukarica included two SSZ candidates: Jovan Pavićević in the twenty-second position and Dragićević in the forty-fifth and final position. The list won a majority victory with twenty-six seats; Pavićević was elected, and Dragićević became his designated successor.

=== Belgrade municipal councillor (2024–present) ===
Aleksandar Šapić was chosen as mayor of Belgrade by the city assembly on 24 June 2024, leading a coalition government that included the Oathkeepers. Dragićević was elected on the same day as his party's representative on city council (i.e., the executive branch of the city government).
