= Borko Puškić =

Serbian politician

Borko Puškić (Serbian Cyrillic: Борко Пушкић; born 24 November 1981) is a politician in Serbia. He was elected to the National Assembly of Serbia in the 2022 Serbian parliamentary election as a member of Dveri.

== Private career ==
Puškić was born in Prijepolje, in what was then the Socialist Republic of Serbia in the Socialist Federal Republic of Yugoslavia. He was raised in the community, attended high school in nearby Užice, graduated from the Higher Technical School of Vocational Studies of the University of Kragujevac with the title of professional traffic engineer-specialist, and later received the title of graduate traffic engineer from the University of Novi Sad Faculty of Transport. He has worked as a driving school instructor and traffic and public road inspector in Prijepolje, and in 2013 he was hired by the municipality's construction directorate. Puškić was also a professional football player during his student years.

== Politician ==
=== Early years (2004–16) ===
Puškić joined Dveri in 2004 (when it was a youth organization) and was an organizer for the movement in Serbia's Raška region. He was a proponent of Dveri's transformation into a political party in 2011.

He appeared on Dveri's electoral list for the Serbian parliament in the 2012 Serbian parliamentary election and its list for the Prijepolje municipal assembly in the concurrent 2012 local elections. The movement did not cross the electoral threshold to win representation at either level. He later appeared on the movement's list in the 2014 parliamentary election; once again, the list did not cross the threshold.

=== Local representative and parliamentarian (2016–present) ===
Dveri contested the 2016 Serbian parliamentary election in an alliance with the Democratic Party of Serbia (Demokratska stranka Srbije, DSS), and Puškić received the twenty-first politician on their combined list. The alliance won thirteen seats, and he was not elected. He was, however, also given the lead position on Dveri's list in Prijepolje in the 2016 local elections and was elected when the list won three mandates. He served in the assembly as an opposition member. Dveri boycotted the 2020 local elections, and Puškić's term ended that year.

Dveri contested the 2022 Serbian parliamentary election in an alliance with the Movement for the Restoration of the Kingdom of Serbia (Pokret obnove Kraljevine Srbije, POKS). Puškić was given the tenth position on their list and was elected when the list won exactly ten mandates. He is slated to take seat in parliament when the assembly convenes.
