= Zagorka Aleksić =

Serbian politician

- Загорка Алексић

Member of the National Assembly of the Republic of Serbia
- Incumbent
- Assumed office 3 August 2020

Member of the City Assembly of Belgrade
- In office 20 June 2022 – 30 October 2023
- In office 14 March 2014 – 11 June 2022

Personal details
- Born: 28 March 1987 (age 39) Titograd, SR Montenegro, SFR Yugoslavia
- Party: JS (2009–present)

Zagorka Aleksić (Serbian Cyrillic: Загорка Алексић; born 28 March 1987) is a Serbian author and politician. She has served in the Serbian parliament since 2020 and was a member of the Belgrade city assembly on an almost uninterrupted basis from 2014 to 2023. Aleksić is a member of United Serbia (JS).

== Early life and career ==
Aleksić was born in Podgorica (then known as Titograd) in what was then the Socialist Republic of Montenegro in the Socialist Federal Republic of Yugoslavia. She was raised in Vranje in the south of Serbia and later moved to Belgrade. She is a graduated politicologist.

She published her first novel, Naši Ljudi (English: Our People), in 2024.

== Politician ==
Aleksić joined United Serbia in 2009 after meeting party leader Dragan Marković. United Serbia has participated in every parliamentary election since 2008 as part of an alliance led by the Socialist Party of Serbia (SPS) and has also cooperated with the SPS at the local level in several cities, including Belgrade.

While still a student, Aleksić received the third position on the SPS's coalition electoral list in the 2014 Belgrade city assembly election and was elected when the list won sixteen mandates. The Serbian Progressive Party (SNS) and its allies won a majority victory and afterward formed a coalition government that included the Socialists, and Aleksić served as part of the government's assembly majority.

She again received the third position on the SPS list in the 2018 Belgrade city election and was re-elected when the list won eight seats. On this occasion, she was the only JS member elected to the city assembly. The SNS won another majority victory and continued to govern in a coalition including the Socialists, with United Serbia providing outside support.

=== Parliamentarian ===
Aleksić was given the tenth position on the SPS's list in the 2020 Serbian parliamentary election and was elected to the national assembly when the list won thirty-two seats. The SNS coalition won a landslide majority victory in the face of an opposition boycott and, as in Belgrade, governed in a coalition including the Socialists. In her first parliamentary term, Aleksić was a member of the health and family committee and the committee on the rights of the child (and the latter's working group for initiatives, petitions, and proposals), a deputy member of the spatial planning committee (Note: Formally known as the Committee on Spatial Planning, Transport, Infrastructure, and Telecommunications.) and the European integration committee, a deputy member of the Parliamentary Assembly of the Mediterranean, and a member of the parliamentary friendship groups with Argentina, Austria, Bosnia and Herzegovina, China, Croatia, Egypt, Germany, Israel, Italy, Montenegro, the Netherlands, Romania, Russia, Spain, and Turkey.

She appeared in the thirtieth position on the SPS's list in the 2022 Serbian parliamentary election and was re-elected when the list won thirty-one seats. In the term that followed, she was a member of the European integration committee and the committee on the rights of the child, a deputy member of the health and family committee, again a deputy member of the Parliamentary Assembly of the Mediterranean, and a member of twenty-four friendship groups. (Note: She was a member of the friendship groups with Austria, Belarus, Belgium, Bosnia and Herzegovina, Brazil, China, Egypt, France, Germany, Greece, Hungary, Israel, Italy, Moldova, Montenegro, Palestine, Qatar, Romania, Russia, Saudi Arabia, Turkey, the United Arab Emirates, the United Kingdom, and the United States of America.)

Aleksić also appeared in the ninth position on the Socialist Party's list in the 2022 Belgrade city assembly election, which took place concurrently with the parliamentary vote. The list won eight seats; she was not immediately elected but received a mandate on 20 June 2022 as a replacement for fellow party member Rade Basta. Her third city assembly term lasted until 30 October 2023, when the assembly was dissolved for early elections.

Aleksić received the seventeenth position on the SPS's list in the 2023 parliamentary election and was re-elected even as the list fell to eighteen seats overall. She is now deputy chair of the committee on the rights of the child, a member of the finance committee, (Note: Formally known as the Committee on Finance, State Budget, and Control of Public Spending.) a deputy member of the spatial planning committee and the European integration committee, a member of the Republic of Serbia–Republika Srpska parliamentary forum, a member of the working group for the improvement of the electoral process, and a member of the friendship groups with Austria, Azerbaijan, Belarus, Denmark, Egypt, Finland, France, Germany, Greece, Hungary, Nicaragua, North Korea, Norway, Romania, Russia, and Sweden.

She was also given the twenty-eighth position on the SPS's list in the 2023 Belgrade city election, which once again took place concurrently with the parliamentary vote, and was not re-elected to the city assembly when the list fell to only five seats.

In October 2024, Aleksić wrote an opinion piece in the journal Politika that supported the government's natalist policy and criticized what she described as the idea of the "supremacy of the self-sufficient individual."
