= Maja Mačužić Puzić =

Serbian politician

Maja Mačužić Puzić (Serbian Cyrillic: Маја Мачужић Пузић; born 7 May 1977), formerly known as Maja Mačužić is a politician in Serbia. She served in the National Assembly of Serbia from 2016 to 2020 and is now a secretary of state in Serbia's ministry of public administration and local self-government. Mačužić Puzič as a member of the Serbian Progressive Party.

== Early life and career ==
Mačužić Puzić was raised in Kraljevo and graduated in economics from the Faculty of Economics and Engineering Management in Novi Sad. She worked with the Organization for Security and Co-operation in Europe (OSCE) Mission to Serbia in Belgrade from 1998 to 2005, at which time she returned to Kraljevo. From 2008 to 2013, she was employed with JKP Čistoća Kraljevo.

== Political career ==
=== Parliamentarian ===
Mačužić Puzić received the 216th position on the Serbian Radical Party's electoral list in the 2008 Serbian parliamentary election. The party won seventy-eight seats, and Mačužić Puzić was not selected as part of its parliamentary delegation. (From 2000 to 2011, Serbian parliamentary mandates were awarded to sponsoring parties or coalitions rather than to individual candidates, and it was common practice for mandates to be awarded out of numerical order. Mačužić Puzić could have been selected to receive a parliamentary mandate despite her low position on the list, though in fact she was not.)

The Radical Party split later in 2008, with several members joining the breakaway Progressive Party under the leadership of Tomislav Nikolić and Aleksandar Vučić. Mačužić Puzić was among those who sided with the Progressives.

Serbia's electoral system was reformed in 2011, such that parliamentary mandates were awarded in numerical order to candidates on successful lists. Mačužić Puzić received the 191st position on the Progressive Party's Aleksandar Vučić — Future We Believe In electoral list in the 2014 Serbian parliamentary election. Although the party won a landslide victory with 158 out of 250 mandates, Mačužić Puzić was not elected and did not receive a seat as a replacement member over the next two years.

Mačužić Puzić was promoted to the ninety-sixth position on the Progressive Party's Aleksandar Vučić – Serbia Is Winning list in the 2016 parliamentary election and was this time elected when the list won a second consecutive majority victory with 131 out of 250 mandates. During the 2016–20 parliament, she was a member of the assembly's foreign affairs committee; a deputy member of the defence and internal affairs committee and the committee on the economy, regional development, trade, tourism, and energy; the head of Serbia's parliamentary friendship group with Algeria; and a member of the parliamentary friendship groups with Azerbaijan, China, France, Germany, Ghana Italy, Japan, Norway, Russia, and the United States of America.

She received the sixty-second position on the Progressive Party's Aleksandar Vučić — For Our Children list in the 2020 Serbian parliamentary election and was elected to a second term in the assembly when the list won a landslide majority with 188 mandates. She resigned her mandate on 28 December 2020.

=== Municipal politics ===
Mačužić Puzić was awarded the third position on the Progressive Party's list for the Kraljevo municipal assembly in the 2012 Serbian local elections and was elected when the list won sixteen mandates. She was appointed to city council (i.e., the executive branch of the city government) on 21 June 2014 with responsibility for project management and regional and international co-operation. She held this position until 29 June 2016.

She received the fourth position on the Progressive Party's list in the 2020 local elections and was returned to the local assembly when the list won a majority victory with forty-six out of seventy mandates. She resigned from the Kraljevo assembly on 29 December 2020, one day after leaving the national assembly.

== Secretary of State ==
Mačužić Puzić was appointed as a secretary of state in Serbia's the department of public administration and local self-government in early 2021.
