= 14th National Assembly of Serbia =

Convocation of the National Assembly of Serbia (2024–2026)

Fourteenth convocation of the National Assembly of the Republic of Serbia
←	13th National Assembly	15th National Assembly	→
- Composition of the 14th National Assembly as constituted in February 2024

Overview
- Meeting place: House of the National Assembly, 13 Nikola Pašić Square, Belgrade
- Term: 6 February 2024 – 17 November 2026
- Election: 17 December 2023
- Government: Third cabinet of Ana Brnabić (acting, until 2 May 2024); Cabinet of Miloš Vučević (2 May 2024 – 16 April 2025); Cabinet of Đuro Macut (from 16 April 2025)
- Website: parlament.gov.rs
- Members: 250
- President: Ana Brnabić (SNS)
- Vice-presidents: Marina Raguš (SNS); Elvira Kovács (VMSZ/SVM); Edin Đerlek (SPP); Jovan Janjić (MI–GIN); Nevena Đurić (SNS); Dunja Simonović Bratić (SPS)
- Party control: SNS group–SPS group majority

The fourteenth convocation of the National Assembly of the Republic of Serbia (Serbian: Четрнаести сазив Народне скупштине Републике Србије, romanised: Četrnaesti saziv Narodne skupštine Republike Srbije) was the convocation of the National Assembly of Serbia from 2024 to 2026. It was constituted in the House of the National Assembly on 6 February 2024 and was dissolved on 9 September 2026, when Aleksandar Vučić called a snap parliamentary election for 25 October 2026. In the election, the SNS-led list lost its majority to the Student List, which won 140 of the 250 seats, according to the final results announced on 5 November 2026.

In the 2023 parliamentary election, the Serbian Progressive Party (SNS)-led alliance regained its parliamentary majority, winning 129 seats. The Serbia Against Violence coalition came second with 65 seats, while the Socialist Party of Serbia (SPS)-led alliance won 18 seats. Ana Brnabić of SNS was elected president of the National Assembly on 20 March 2024. The convocation elected the cabinet of Miloš Vučević on 2 May 2024 and the cabinet of Đuro Macut on 16 April 2025. At the time of its dissolution, it had 18 parliamentary groups. After Aleksandar Vučić resigned as President of Serbia on 27 September 2026, Brnabić became acting president of Serbia.

== Background ==
Parliamentary elections in Serbia were held on 17 December 2023. The Serbia Must Not Stop alliance led by the Serbian Progressive Party (SNS) won 129 seats, and Serbia Against Violence came second with 65 seats. The alliance led by the Socialist Party of Serbia (SPS) won 18 seats, its worst result since the 2007 parliamentary election.

== Leadership ==
The leadership of the fourteenth convocation was elected at the constitutive session on 20 March 2024. Ana Brnabić of SNS was elected president of the National Assembly, while Sandra Božić and Marina Raguš of SNS, Snežana Paunović of SPS, Elvira Kovács of the Alliance of Vojvodina Hungarians, Edin Đerlek of the Justice and Reconciliation Party, and Jovan Janjić of We – Voice from the People were elected vice-presidents. Srđan Smiljanić, an independent politician, was appointed secretary-general.

Božić resigned from the National Assembly on 7 May 2024. The following day, the Assembly of Vojvodina elected her vice-president of the government of Vojvodina. Nevena Đurić was elected vice-president on 19 March 2025. Paunović resigned on 15 April 2025 to join the government of Serbia, and was succeeded as vice-president by Dunja Simonović Bratić of SPS.

Decision on the election of the president of the National Assembly; Ana Brnabić (SNS)
Ballot →	20 March 2024
Required majority →	126 out of 250
Yes: • SNSDS (111); • SPS–Zeleni (13); • VMSZ/SVM (6); • SDPS (6); • PUPS (6); • PS–NSS–USS–RS (5); • JS (4); • MPs not members of any group (2)	153 / 250
No: • MI–SN (3); • MI–GIN (2)	5 / 250
Abstentions	0 / 250
Absentees: • SSP–PSG (19); • NPS–NLS (14); • NADA (13); • ZLF (10); • SRCE (9); • DS (8); • EU (5); • MI–GIN (5); • MI–SN (3); • SNSDS (2); • JS (1); • MPs not members of any group (3)	92 / 250

== Timeline ==
=== 2024 ===
The constitutive session began on 6 February 2024, when the mandates of the elected members were confirmed. It resumed on 18 March and ended on 20 March. During the session, the president, vice-presidents and general secretary of the National Assembly, the members of its working bodies, and the members of its permanent delegations to international institutions were elected.

After Aleksandar Vučić, the president of Serbia, gave Miloš Vučević the mandate to form a government, the National Assembly elected Vučević and his cabinet at a special session on 2 May 2024. The first extraordinary session began on 23 July, with 60 items on its agenda. During the session, Brnabić issued a warning to Aleksandar Jovanović Ćuta.

The second extraordinary session was held from 23 to 30 September 2024. In October 2024, during the debate on a proposed ban on lithium mining at the first sitting of the autumn regular session, Brnabić and SNS MP Nebojša Bakarec used profanity against opposition members; Bakarec called Zdravko Ponoš "Ustaša garbage" (đubre jedno ustaško). Kovács, who was presiding that day, declined to censure Bakarec, and his remark was left out of the official transcript.

=== 2025 ===
A session on 4 March 2025 was interrupted when opposition MPs threw flares and smoke bombs in protest at the delay in confirming the resignation of the Cabinet of Miloš Vučević; three MPs were injured. On 16 April 2025, the National Assembly elected the cabinet of Đuro Macut.

=== 2026 ===
In May 2026, the National Assembly adopted amendments to several electoral laws, dubbed "Petrašinović's laws" after SNS MP Miroslav Petrašinović. The government said they implemented more than 70% of the recommendations of the Office for Democratic Institutions and Human Rights (ODIHR), while the opposition and non-governmental organisations argued that key recommendations remained unaddressed.

On 7 September 2026, the government submitted a proposal to dissolve the National Assembly. Vučić signed the decree on 9 September, calling a parliamentary election for 25 October 2026. After Vučić resigned as president of Serbia on 27 September to head the SNS-led list, Brnabić, as president of the National Assembly, became acting president of Serbia; the presidential election has to be held by 27 December 2026. In the parliamentary election, the Student List won 140 seats and the SNS-led "Aleksandar Vučić – United Serbia" list 103, after voting had been repeated at 53 polling stations on 1 November. The Republic Electoral Commission announced the final results on 5 November, starting the 30-day period within which the fifteenth convocation must hold its constitutive sitting, which Brnabić had said she would convene as soon as the results were announced.

=== Legislation ===
The law on local elections was amended under an urgent procedure on 23 April 2024, with 165 votes in favour and 26 against. The law on the unified voter roll was amended on 10 May 2024, with 153 votes in favour.

== Parliamentary groups ==
In April 2024, the parliamentary group of the Party of Freedom and Justice (SSP) and the Movement of Free Citizens (PSG) was dissolved after all three PSG MPs left it. SSP then formed its own group, while the PSG MPs sat without a group until September 2024, when they formed a group with the Party of Democratic Action of Sandžak and the Party for Democratic Action. In April 2026, Željko Veselinović's group joined with MPs of the Russian Party and the United Peasant Party to form the "Workers' Party – Russian Party – United Peasant Party" group.

In August 2026, the Democratic Party renamed its group "Deputies with the Students: For Election Control". Deputies from other parties and independents then joined, doubling its membership to 16. The aim was to secure more places on permanent polling-station committees, which the group said it would put at the disposal of the Student List.

Parliamentary groups at dissolution (9 September 2026)
Parliamentary group	MPs
Aleksandar Vučić – Serbia Must Not Stop	110
Ivica Dačić – Socialist Party of Serbia (SPS)	12
People's Movement of Serbia – New Face of Serbia	12
Party of Freedom and Justice	12
Deputies with the Students: For Election Control	16
New DSS and Monarchists – NADA	10
Green–Left Front – Don't Let Belgrade Drown	10
Serbia Centre – SRCE	8
We – Voice from the People	6
PSG–SDA of Sandžak–PDD	6
PUPS – Solidarity and Justice	6
Alliance of Vojvodina Hungarians	6
Social Democratic Party of Serbia	6
Dragan Marković Palma – United Serbia	5
Ecological Uprising	5
We – Power of the People prof dr Branimir Nestorović	5
Workers' Party – Russian Party – United Peasant Party	5
Healthy Serbia – Movement of Socialists	5
MPs not members of parliamentary groups	5
Total	250

== Members ==
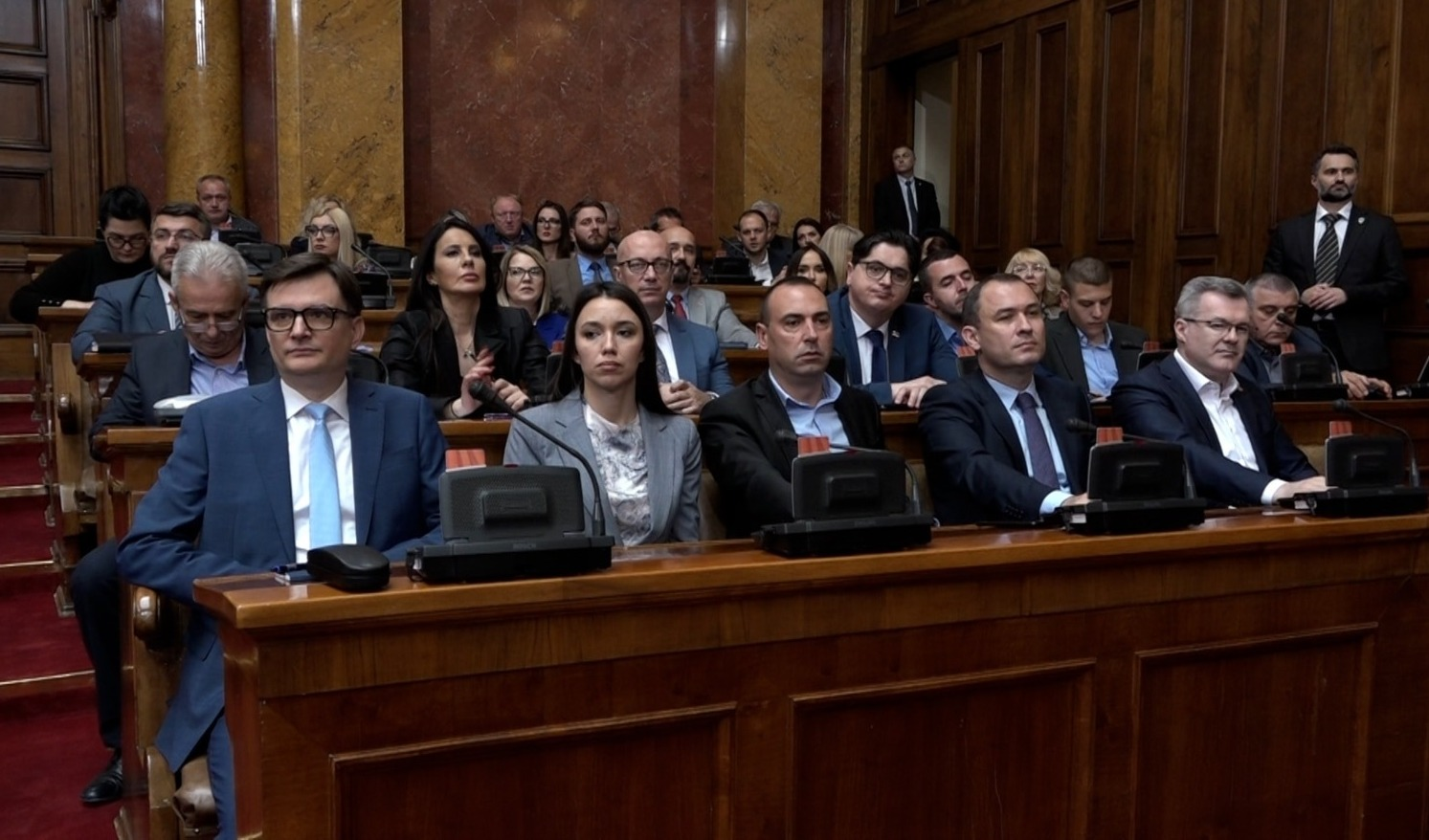
Members of the Serbian Progressive Party, the largest party in the 14th National Assembly

The tables below list the members of the fourteenth convocation by parliamentary group at the time of its dissolution, followed by former members.

=== Aleksandar Vučić – Serbia Must Not Stop ===
Name	Political party	Year of birth	Notes
Andrijana Aleksandrov	SNS	1979	
Ivan Antić	SNS	1978	
Dragana Arsić	SNS	1983	
Veroljub Arsić	SNS	1969	
Marko Atlagić	SNS	1949	
Nebojša Bakarec	SNS	1963	
Igor Bečić	SNS	1971	
Ana Beloica Martać	SNS	1992	
Nikola Bokan	SNS	1999	
Ana Brnabić	SNS	1975	
Dejan Bulatović	SSD	1975	
Aleksandar Čotrić	SPO	1966	
Tijana Davidovac	SNS	1986	
Olivera Denić	SNS	1989	
Zoran Dragišić	SNS	1967	
Milovan Drecun	SNS	1957	
Sanja Džajić	SNS	1989	
Vladimir Đukanović	SNS	1979	
Nevena Đurić	SNS	1993	Parliamentary deputy leader
Vesna Đurišić	SNS	1979	
Ninoslav Erić	SNS	1976	
Dubravka Filipovski	SNS	1967	
Miloš Gnjidić	SNS	1984	
Žika Gojković	SNS	1972	
Uglješa Grgur	SNS	1962	
Mladen Grujić	SNS	1966	
Dejan Gurešić	SNS	1967	
Sonja Ilić	SNS	1981	
Biljana Ilić Stošić	SNS	1964	
Nataša Ivanović	SNS	1978	
Lepomir Ivković	SNS	1959	
Biljana Jakovljević	SNS	1988	
Igor D. Jakšić	SNS	1968	
Tomislav Janković	SNS	1973	
Stanislava Janošević	SNS	1986	
Branislav Josifović	SNS	1991	
Milenko Jovanov	SNS	1980	Parliamentary leader
Darko Jovanović	SNS	1977	
Dragan Jovanović	SNS	1972	
Jadranka Jovanović	SNS	1958	
Nataša Jovanović	SNS	1966	
Snežana Jovanović	SNS	1986	
Aleksandar Jugović	SPO	1975	
Stefan Kitanović	SNS	1992	
Jovan Kolundžija	SNS	1948	
Miroslav Kondić	SNS	1980	
Nenad Krstić	SNS	1980	
Darko Laketić	SNS	1975	
Nikola Lazić	SNS	1999	
Miodrag Linta	SNS	1969	
Nada Macura	SNS	1948	
Dušan Marić	SNS	1963	
Aleksandar Marković	SNS	1981	
Veroljub Matić	SNS	1953	
Nataša Mihajlović	SNS	1993	
Marko Milenković	SNS	1974	
Goran Milić	SNS	1982	
Nataša Milić Milaš	SNS	1980	
Svetlana Miljić	SNS	1970	
Slobodan Milisavljević	SNS	1965	
Ana Miljanić	SNS	1982	
Radoslav Milojičić	SNS (Note: Milojičić was president of the Serbian Left at the start of the convocation and joined SNS in June 2024.)	1984	
Sanja Milošević	SNS	1996	
Aleksandar Mirković	SNS	1988	
Marko Mladenović	SNS	1990	
Zdravko Mladenović	SNS	1977	
Uglješa Mrdić	SNS	1978	
Lidija Načić	SNS	1959	
Vesna Nedović	SNS	1966	
Anita Nešić	SNS	1979	
Dragan Nikolić	SNS	1960	
Goran Nikolić	SNS	1976	
Milica Nikolić	SNS	1993	
Tatjana Nikolić	SNS	1970	
Jasmina Obradović	SNS	1961	
Jovan Palalić	SNP	1971	
Jasmina Palurović	SNS	1972	
Nikola Pantelić	SNS	1993	
Biljana Pantić Pilja	SNS	1983	
Miroslav Petrašinović	SNS	1985	
Olja Petrović	SNS	1990	
Tatjana Petrović Stojković	SNS	1966	
Stojan Radenović	SNS	1948	
Milan Radin	SNS	1988	
Dragana Radinović	SNS	1976	
Nikola Radosavljević	SNS	1975	
Marina Raguš	SNS	1969	
Ivan Rajičić	SNS	1987	
Goran Rakić	SNS	1971	
Tanja Rađenović	SNS	1973	
Željko Rebrača	SNS	1972	
Marijan Rističević	NSS	1958	
Nenad Ristović	SNS	1969	
Vesna Savović Petković	SNS	1973	
Goran Spasojević	SNS	1968	
Dane Stanojčić	SNS	1979	
Katarina Stojanović	SNS	1989	
Staša Stojanović	SNS	1991	
Dušan Stojiljković	SNS	1982	
Vesna Stanković	SNS	1967	
Sanela Strainović	SNS	1973	
Dalibor Šćekić	SNS	1979	
Aleksandra Tomić	SNS	1969	
Radovan Tvrdišić	SNS	1971	
Nevena Veinović	SNS	1996	
Ljubica Vraneš	SNS	1979	
Milimir Vujadinović	SNS	1979	
Danijela Vujičić	SNS	1978	
Marija Zdravković	SNS	1973	
Source: National Assembly of Serbia

=== Ivica Dačić – Socialist Party of Serbia (SPS) ===
Name	Political party	Year of birth	Notes
Aleksandar Antić	SPS	1969	
Dušan Bajatović	SPS	1967	Parliamentary leader
Nataša Bogunović	SPS	1973	
Sanja Ćalović	SPS	1975	
Ivan Karić	Zeleni	1975	
Mirka Lukić Šarkanović	SPS	1968	
Uglješa Marković	SPS	1991	Parliamentary deputy leader
Marko Milošević	SPS	1999	
Aleksandra Pavlović Marković	SPS	1968	
Dijana Radović	SPS	1989	
Branko Ružić	SPS	1975	
Dunja Simonović Bratić	SPS	1981	Vice-president of the National Assembly
Source: National Assembly of Serbia

=== People's Movement of Serbia – New Face of Serbia ===
Name	Political party	Year of birth	Notes
Miroslav Aleksić	NPS	1978	Parliamentary leader
Uroš Đokić	NPS	1982	
Ana Eraković	NPS	1985	
Aleksandar Ivanović	NPS	1982	
Ana Jakovljević	NPS	1981	
Nenad Milojičić	NPS	1978	
Dragan Ninković	NLS	1975	
Borislav Novaković	NPS	1964	Parliamentary deputy leader
Miloš Parandilović	NLS	1989	
Snežana Rakić	NPS	1961	
Ivana Rokvić	NPS	1977	
Đorđe Stanković	NPS	1989	
Source: National Assembly of Serbia

=== Party of Freedom and Justice ===
In October 2024, Željko Veselinović and Đorđo Đorđić left the SSP parliamentary group. They were followed in November by Sonja Pernat and Irena Živković. Veselinović went on to found the Workers' Party, which was registered in May 2026.

Name	Political party	Year of birth	Notes
Dragan Đilas	SSP	1967	
Dalibor Jekić	SSP	1977	
Branko Miljuš	SSP	1972	
Jelena Milošević	SSP	1988	
Peđa Mitrović	SSP	1988	
Dušan Nikezić	SSP	1973	
Tatjana Pašić	SSP	1964	
Goran Petrović	SSP	1966	Parliamentary deputy leader
Mila Popović	SSP	1978	
Jelena Spirić	SSP	1982	
Borko Stefanović	SSP	1974	
Marinika Tepić	SSP	1974	Parliamentary leader
Source: National Assembly of Serbia

=== Deputies with the Students: For Election Control ===
Until August 2026, the group was known as "Democratic Party – DS" and consisted only of the eight DS MPs.

Name	Political party	Year of birth	Notes
Miloljub Albijanić	Independent (Note: Albijanić was elected on the list of Healthy Serbia (ZS) and later left the party.)	1967	
Vladimir Đorđević	POKS	1973	
Ljubinko Đurković	POKS	1962	
Zoran Lutovac	DS	1964	
Ksenija Marković	DS (Note: Elected on the list of Together, which merged into DS in December 2024.)	1986	
Vojislav Mihailović	POKS	1951	
Srđan Milivojević	DS	1965	Parliamentary leader
Nenad Mitrović	DS	1970	
Nebojša Novaković	DS	1984	
Jelena Pavlović	Independent (Note: Pavlović was a member of MI–GIN and later MI–SN, and of their parliamentary groups, until December 2024.)	1976	
Sonja Pernat	Independent (Note: Pernat was a member of SSP and its parliamentary group until 19 November 2024, and later sat in the Sloga group.)	1976	
Slavica Radovanović	Nova–D2SP (Note: Radovanović was a member of NPS and its parliamentary group until 20 November 2024 and subsequently joined the New Party–Experts Should Have A Say. She sat in the Sloga group until 2026.)	1966	
Dragana Rakić	DS	1973	Parliamentary deputy leader
Dragana Rašić	DS	1984	
Žarko Ristić	Independent (Note: Ristić was a member of NPS and its parliamentary group until 12 September 2024, when he was expelled.)	1980	
Filip Tatalović	DS	1981	
Source: National Assembly of Serbia

=== New DSS and Monarchists – NADA ===
The three POKS MPs who did not continue with the Monarchists joined the "Deputies with the Students" group in August 2026.

Name	Political party	Year of birth	Notes
Vladimir Jelić	Monarchists–PKS	1977	
Miloš Jovanović	NDSS	1976	Parliamentary leader
Predrag Marsenić	NDSS	1970	
Slađana Miletić	NDSS	1972	
Slađana Radisaljević	NDSS	1968	
Dušan Radosavljević	Monarchists–PKS	1959	
Zoran Sandić	NDSS	1970	
Zoran Stojanović	NDSS	1968	
Dejan Šulkić	NDSS	1972	
Nenad Tomašević	Monarchists–PKS	1971	
Source: National Assembly of Serbia

=== Green–Left Front – Don't Let Belgrade Drown ===
Name	Political party	Year of birth	Notes
Rastislav Dinić	ZLF	1978	
Biljana Đorđević	ZLF	1984	Parliamentary deputy leader
Robert Kozma	ZLF	1983	
Radomir Lazović	ZLF	1980	Parliamentary leader
Marina Mijatović	ZLF	1976	
Đorđe Pavićević	ZLF	1966	
Bogdan Radovanović	ZLF	1989	
Anđela Ruvidić	ZLF	1994	
Natalija Stojmenović	ZLF	1995	
Dobrica Veselinović	ZLF	1981	
Source: National Assembly of Serbia

=== Serbia Centre – SRCE ===
Name	Political party	Year of birth	Notes
Slobodan Cvejić	SRCE	1965	
Dragan Delić	SRCE	1953	
Stefan Janjić	SRCE	1987	Parliamentary deputy leader
Tatjana Marković Topalović	SRCE	1969	
Verica Milanović	SRCE	1969	
Slobodan Petrović	SRCE	1990	
Zdravko Ponoš	SRCE	1962	Parliamentary leader
Source: National Assembly of Serbia

=== We – Voice from the People ===
Name	Political party	Year of birth	Notes
Jovan Janjić	MI–GIN	1963	Vice-president of the National Assembly
Mitar Kovač	MI–GIN	1959	Parliamentary deputy leader
Ana Krstić	MI–GIN	1986	
Siniša Ljepojević	MI–GIN	1956	
Branko Pavlović	MI–GIN	1960	Parliamentary leader
Dragan Stanojević	MI–GIN	1971	
Source: National Assembly of Serbia

=== PSG–SDA of Sandžak–PDD ===
Name	Political party	Year of birth	Notes
Pavle Grbović	PSG	1993	Parliamentary leader
Minela Kalender	SDAS	1984	
Shaip Kamberi	PVD/PDD	1964	
Anna Oreg	PSG	1985	
Vladimir Pajić	PSG	1989	
Ahmedin Škrijelj	SDAS	1982	Parliamentary deputy leader
Source: National Assembly of Serbia

=== PUPS – Solidarity and Justice ===
Name	Political party	Year of birth	Notes
Aleksandar Đukić	PUPS	1997	
Risto Kostov	PUPS	1954	
Stefan Krkobabić	PUPS	1989	Parliamentary leader
Dragan M. Marković	PUPS	1965	
Ilo Mihajlovski	PUPS	1960	
Milorad Stošić	PUPS	1954	Parliamentary deputy leader
Source: National Assembly of Serbia

=== Alliance of Vojvodina Hungarians ===
Name	Political party	Year of birth	Notes
Boris Bajić	VMSZ/SVM	1982	Parliamentary deputy leader
Elvira Kovács	VMSZ/SVM	1982	Vice-president of the National Assembly
Bálint Pásztor	VMSZ/SVM	1979	Parliamentary leader
József Tóbiás	VMSZ/SVM	1971	
Ákos Újhelyi	VMSZ/SVM	1977	
Emese Úri	VMSZ/SVM	1967	
Source: National Assembly of Serbia

=== Social Democratic Party of Serbia ===
Name	Political party	Year of birth	Notes
Muamer Bačevac	SDPS	1977	Parliamentary deputy leader
Edis Durgutović	SDPS	1983	
Sanja Jefić Branković	SDPS	1984	
Branimir Jovanović	SDPS	1979	Parliamentary leader
Jasmina Karanac	SDPS	1967	
Slađana Šušnjar	SDPS	1975	
Source: National Assembly of Serbia

=== Dragan Marković Palma – United Serbia ===
Name	Political party	Year of birth	Notes
Zagorka Aleksić	JS	1987	
Nenad Filipović	JS	1972	
Marija Jevđić	JS	1981	
Života Starčević	JS	1968	Parliamentary deputy leader
Vojislav Vujić	JS	1975	
Source: National Assembly of Serbia

=== Ecological Uprising ===
Name	Political party	Year of birth	Notes
Dragan Jonić	EU	1966	
Aleksandar Jovanović Ćuta	EU	1966	Parliamentary leader
Milica Marušić Jablanović	EU	1983	
Danijela Nestorović	EU	1974	Parliamentary deputy leader
Goran Petković	EU	1963	
Source: National Assembly of Serbia

=== We – Power of the People prof dr Branimir Nestorović ===
The group was known as "We – Strength from the People prof dr Branimir Nestorović" until April 2024.

Name	Political party	Year of birth	Notes
Borislav Antonijević	MI–SN	1967	Parliamentary deputy leader
Slobodan Ilić	Independent (Note: Ilić was elected on the list of Serbia Centre (SRCE) and was originally a member of its parliamentary group.)	1978	
Ana Ivanović	MI–SN	1971	
Branko Lukić	MI–SN	1959	Parliamentary leader
Branimir Nestorović	MI–SN	1954	
Source: National Assembly of Serbia

=== Workers' Party – Russian Party – United Peasant Party ===
The group was formed in April 2026 as the successor to the "Movement Sloga – Experts Should Have A Say" group, which Veselinović, Đorđić, Pernat, Živković and Radovanović had formed in November 2024.

Name	Political party	Year of birth	Notes
Đorđo Đorđić	RP (Note: Đorđić was a member of SSP and its parliamentary group until 28 October 2024.)	1978	
Milija Miletić	USS	1968	
Slobodan Nikolić	RS	1957	
Željko Veselinović	RP (Note: Veselinović was a member of the SSP parliamentary group until 28 October 2024.)	1974	Parliamentary leader
Irena Živković	RP (Note: Živković was a member of SSP and its parliamentary group until 19 November 2024.)	1979	
Source: National Assembly of Serbia

=== Healthy Serbia – Movement of Socialists ===
Name	Political party	Year of birth	Notes
Radomir Bojović	ZS	1962	
Đorđe Komlenski	PS	1965	
Ivana Stamatović	ZS	1991	
Lidija Šarac	SNP	1958	
Bojan Torbica	PS	1965	Parliamentary leader
Source: National Assembly of Serbia

=== Members without a parliamentary group ===
Name	Political party	Year of birth
Igor Braunović	Independent (Note: Braunović was a member of SPS and its parliamentary group until February 2025.)	1975
Edin Đerlek	SPP	1987
Bogdana Koljević Griffith	Independent (Note: Koljević Griffith was a member of MI–GIN and later MI–SN, and of their parliamentary groups, until 12 July 2024.)	1979
Edin Numanović	SPP	1994
Aleksandar Pavić	Independent (Note: Pavić was a member of MI–SN and deputy leader of its parliamentary group until March 2026.)	1961
Source: National Assembly of Serbia

=== Former members ===
Name	Political party	Parliamentary group	Year of birth	Term	Notes
Slavica Škrbić	POKS	NADA	1980	6 February 2024	
Marija Vojinović	POKS	NADA	1980	6 February 2024	Resigned
Predrag Bandić	SNS	AV–SNSDS	1968	6 February – 27 March 2024	Resigned; later served in the government of Serbia
Nikola Selaković	SNS	AV–SNSDS	1983	6 February – 27 March 2024	Resigned; later served in the government of Serbia
Miloš Vučević	SNS	AV–SNSDS	1974	6 February – 27 March 2024	Resigned; later became prime minister of Serbia
Nastasja Baković	NLS	NPS–NLS	1999	6 February – 17 April 2024	
Milan Krkobabić	PUPS	PUPS	1952	6 February – 30 April 2024	Resigned to serve in the government of Serbia
Ivica Dačić	SPS	SPS–Zeleni	1966	6 February – 1 May 2024	Resigned to serve in the government of Serbia
Slavica Đukić Dejanović	SPS	SPS–Zeleni	1951	6 February – 1 May 2024	Resigned to serve in the government of Serbia
Arno Gujon	SNS	AV–SNSDS	1985	6 February – 1 May 2024	Resigned to serve in the government of Serbia
Zlatibor Lončar	SNS	AV–SNSDS	1971	6 February – 1 May 2024	Resigned to serve in the government of Serbia
Tatjana Macura	Independent	AV–SNSDS	1981	6 February – 1 May 2024	Resigned to serve in the government of Serbia
Đorđe Milićević	SPS	SPS–Zeleni	1978	6 February – 1 May 2024	Resigned to serve in the government of Serbia
Petar Petković	SNS	AV–SNSDS	1980	6 February – 1 May 2024	Resigned to serve in the government of Serbia
Dejan Ristić	SNS	AV–SNSDS	1972	6 February – 1 May 2024	Resigned to serve in the government of Serbia
Novica Tončev	SPS	SPS–Zeleni	1962	6 February – 1 May 2024	Resigned to serve in the government of Serbia
Usame Zukorlić	SPP	Members without a parliamentary group	1992	6 February – 1 May 2024	Resigned to serve in the government of Serbia
Jelena Žarić Kovačević	SNS	AV–SNSDS	1981	6 February – 1 May 2024	Resigned to serve in the government of Serbia
Sandra Božić	SNS	AV–SNSDS	1979	6 February – 7 May 2024	Resigned to serve in the government of Vojvodina
Rejhan Kurtović	SPP	Members without a parliamentary group	1986	1–20 May 2024	Resigned to serve in the government of Serbia
Ivana Nikolić	SNS	AV–SNSDS	1989	6 February – 10 June 2024	Resigned to serve as deputy mayor of Ub
Vladimir Orlić	SNS	AV–SNSDS	1979	6 February – 13 June 2024	Resigned to serve as director of the Security Intelligence Agency
Sabira Hadžiavdić	SPP	Members without a parliamentary group	1975	23 July 2024	Resigned
Jelena Bogdanović	POKS	NADA	1988	1 May – 24 July 2024	
Selma Kučević	SDAS	Members without a parliamentary group	1991	6 February – 6 August 2024	Resigned to serve as mayor of Tutin
Mirza Hajdinović	SDAS	Members without a parliamentary group	1977	24 September 2024	Resigned at the direction of the SDAS leadership
Dragana Lukić	SNS	AV–SNSDS	1988	6 February – 8 November 2024	Resigned to serve as mayor of Loznica
Dragan Marković	JS	JS	1960	6 February – 22 November 2024	Died
Vladan Zagrađanin	SPS	SPS–Zeleni	1968	6 February – 25 November 2024	Resigned to serve in the government of Serbia
Živan Bajić	SNS	AV–SNSDS	1982	6 February 2024 – 22 January 2025	
Branko Vujković	SNS	AV–SNSDS	1979	1 March 2024 – 22 January 2025	
Ninoslav Erić	SNS	AV–SNSDS	1976	5–11 March 2025	
Snežana Paunović	SPS	SPS–Zeleni	1975	6 February 2024 – 15 April 2025	Resigned to serve in the government of Serbia
Aleksandar Antić	SPS	SPS–Zeleni	1969	1 May 2024 – 17 April 2025	
Aleksandra Pavlović Marković	SPS	SPS–Zeleni	1968	27 November 2024 – 17 April 2025	
Tijana Perić Diligenski	SRCE	SRCE	1986	6 February 2024 – 1 July 2025	
Dejan Tomašević	SNS	AV–SNSDS	1973	6 February 2024 – 3 December 2025	Resigned to serve as president of the Olympic Committee of Serbia
Milan Glušac	SNS	AV–SNSDS	1977	17 December 2025	
Jelena Jerinić	ZLF	ZLF	1978	6 February 2024 – 29 June 2026	
Source: National Assembly of Serbia
