= Jovan Janjić =

Serbian politician

- Јован Јањић

Vice President of the National Assembly of the Republic of Serbia
- Incumbent
- Assumed office 20 March 2024

Member of the National Assembly of the Republic of Serbia
- Incumbent
- Assumed office 6 February 2024

Personal details
- Born: 1963 (age 62–63) Vrbić, Krupanj, SR Serbia, SFR Yugoslavia
- Party: MI-GIN
- Education: University of Belgrade Faculty of Law, Megatrend University
- Occupation: Politician, Researcher

Jovan Janjić (Serbian Cyrillic: Јован Јањић; born 1963) is a Serbian author, publisher, researcher, and politician. He has served in the Serbian parliament since February 2024 and has been one of its vice-presidents (i.e., deputy speakers) since March 2024. Janjić is a member of We – Voice from the People (MI-GIN).

== Early life and academic career ==
Janjić was born in the village of Vrbić in the municipality of Krupanj during the time of socialist Yugoslavia; in the year of his birth, the People's Republic of Serbia formally reconstituted itself as the Socialist Republic of Serbia within the Socialist Federal Republic of Yugoslavia. He later moved to Belgrade and now lives in the municipality of Palilula.

He holds a bachelor's degree and a master's degree from the University of Belgrade Faculty of Law; his master's thesis was on the subject, "The role of the clergy in the creation and work of the state organs of the First Serbian Uprising." He later received a doctorate from Megatrend University with the thesis, "Cultural dimension of the activities of the Serbian Orthodox Church in the second half of the 20th century (1945-2000)."

Janjić has been a research associate at the Institute for Political Studies in Belgrade since September 2021.

== Journalist, author, and administrator ==
Janjić was a journalist for NIN between 1990 and 2010. In July 1992, he also became editor-in-chief of Javnosti, a newspaper published by the Bosnian Serb assembly. Before, during, and immediately after the Bosnian War (1992–95), he conducted several detailed interviews with members of the Bosnian Serb leadership, including Radovan Karadžić, Ratko Mladić, Momčilo Krajišnik, Biljana Plavšić, and Nikola Koljević. On many occasions, his interviews provided a forum for Bosnian Serb officials to outline their strategic military and political aims. In 1996, he published a work on the Bosnian War and the Dayton Agreement entitled Američki Rat i Mir (English: American War and Peace) as well as a biographical work entitled Srpski General Ratko Mladić (English: Serbian General Ratko Mladić).

In 2008, Janjić acted as an advisor to the ministry of religion in the Serbian government.

His 2009 book Budimo ljudi – život i reč patrijarha Pavla (English: Let Us Be People – The Life and Works of Patriarch Pavle) was a best-seller in Serbia, the Republika Srpska, and Montenegro, and a Russian language version of the work was published in 2010. In 2013, he wrote the follow-up work, Budimo ljudi – pouke i poruke patrijarha Pavla (Let Us Be People – The Lessons and Messages of Patriarch Pavle). He has written several other works on the role of religion in Serbian culture.

He has also worked as editor-in-chief for the literary magazine Književnost and was general director and editor-in-chief of the publishing company Prosveta from 2011 to 2013.

== Politician ==
Janjić appeared in the eleventh position on the We – Voice from the People electoral list in the 2023 Serbian parliamentary election and was elected to the national assembly when the list won thirteen seats. He took his seat when the assembly convened in February 2024. Shortly thereafter, the We movement split into two factions, with list holder Branimir Nestorović leaving to form a new group called We – Power of the People (MI–SN). Janjić remained with MI-GIN. On March 20 2024, he was elected as one of six assembly vice-presidents. The Serbian Progressive Party (SNS) and its allies won a majority victory in the 2023 election and later formed a new coalition government; both the MI-GIN and MI-SN groups serve in opposition.

Janjić appeared in third position on the MI-GIN list in the 2024 Belgrade City Assembly election. The list did not cross the electoral threshold for representation in the city assembly.

In addition to serving as an assembly vice-president, Janjić is also a member of the culture and information committee and the committee on the rights of the child, one Serbia's two delegates to the Interparliamentary Assembly on Orthodoxy, the leader of Serbia's parliamentary friendship groups with the Democratic Republic of the Congo and Tunisia, and a member of the friendship groups with Armenia, Belarus, Georgia, Romania, and Russia.
