= Đerlek =

Đerlek is a surname. Notable people with the surname include:

- Armin Đerlek (born 2000), Serbian footballer
- Edin Đerlek (born 1987), Serbian politician
