= Nikola Radosavljević =

Nikola Radosavljević may refer to:

- Nikola Radosavljević, perpetrator of the Jabukovac killings
- Nikola Radosavljević (politician), Serbian politician
