= Olja Petrović =

Olja Petrović may refer to:

- Ognjen Petrović, Serbian footballer
- Olja Petrović (politician), Serbian politician
