= Milica Nikolić =

Milica Nikolić may refer to:

- Milica Nikolić (politician)
- Milica Nikolić (judoka)
