= Aleksandar Marković =

Aleksandar Marković may refer to:

- Aleksandar Marković (conductor) (born 1975), Serbian conductor.
- Aleksandar Marković (politician) (born 1981), Serbian politician.
