= Biljana Jakovljević =

Serbian politician

Biljana Jakovljević (Serbian Cyrillic: Биљана Јаковљевић; born 1988), formerly known as Biljana Belić, is a politician in Serbia. She has served in the National Assembly of Serbia since 2020 as a member of the Serbian Progressive Party.

== Private career ==
Jakovljević has a master's degree in pedagogy. She lives in Čačak.

== Politician ==
=== Municipal politics ===
Jakovljević received the fifty-fourth position on the Progressive Party's electoral list for the Čačak city assembly in the 2016 Serbian local elections. The list won thirty-five mandates, and she was not initially returned. She was, however, awarded a mandate in September 2019 as the replacement for another party member. During her time in the city assembly, she served as president of the youth council and was a member of the committee for public order and peace. She did not seek re-election at the local level in 2020.

She is the chair of the Progressive Party's local board in the village of Ostra and has been active with the party's Academy of Young Leaders program.

She is not to be confused with a Social Democratic Party of Serbia politician from Čačak named Biljana Belić.

=== Member of the National Assembly ===
Jakovljević received the 123rd position on the Progressive Party's Aleksandar Vučić — For Our Children list in the 2020 parliamentary election and was elected when the list won a landslide majority with 188 out of 250 mandates. She is now a member of the assembly committee on labour, social issues, social inclusion, and poverty reduction; a deputy member of the committee on the diaspora and Serbs in the region; a deputy member of the committee on education, science, technological development, and the information society; the leader of Serbia's parliamentary friendship group with Lesotho; and a member of the parliamentary friendship groups with Australia, Austria, Belgium, China, Egypt, France, Germany, Greece, Italy, Japan, Norway, Slovenia, Spain, Sweden, Switzerland, the United Kingdom, and the United States of America.
