= Tijana Perić Diligenski =

Serbian politician

- Тијана Перић Дилигенски

Member of the National Assembly of the Republic of Serbia
- In office 6 February 2024 – 1 July 2025

Personal details
- Born: 11 May 1986 (age 39) Knin, SR Croatia, SFR Yugoslavia
- Party: SRCE (2023 – 2025)

Tijana Perić Diligenski (Serbian Cyrillic: Тијана Перић Дилигенски; born 11 May 1986) is a Serbian politician. She has served in the National Assembly of Serbia from February 2024 to July 2025 as a member of Serbia Centre (SRCE).

== Early life and career ==
Perić Diligenski was born in Knin, in what was then the Socialist Republic of Croatia in the Socialist Federal Republic of Yugoslavia. She later moved to Serbia and graduated from elementary school and high school in Belgrade. She earned a bachelor's degree from the University of Belgrade Faculty of Law in 2009 and received a master's degree from the faculty's theoretical-legal department in 2011 on the topic, "Pound's critique of mechanical jurisprudence." In 2017, she was awarded a doctorate from the University of Belgrade Faculty of Political Sciences on the topic, "Institutional factors of political corruption in the post-Yugoslav area 2000-2014." She has published widely in her field and is currently employed at the Institute for Political Studies in Belgrade as a senior research associate. Perić Diligenski has been involved in anti-corruption initiatives with the World Bank and the European Union.

== Politician ==
Serbia Centre participated in the 2023 Serbian parliamentary election as part of the multi-party Serbia Against Violence (SPN) coalition. Perić Diligenski was given the fourth position on the coalition's electoral list and was elected when the list won sixty-five mandates. The Serbian Progressive Party (SNS) and its allies won the election, and Serbia Centre serves in opposition.

Perić Diligenski is now a member of the committee on the rights of the child and the committee on human and minority rights and gender equality, and a deputy member of the environmental protection committee, the European integration committee, and the European Union–Serbia stabilisation and association committee.

In January 2024, she criticized the Serbian government for failing to adopt a national strategic policy on combatting corruption, noting that the country had fallen to a "devastating" 104th place on Transparency International's anti-corruption ranking.

Perić Diligenski was a vice-president of Serbia Centre.
