= Nikola Bokan =

Serbian politician (born 1999)

Member of the National Assembly of Serbia
- Incumbent
- Assumed office 6 February 2024

Personal details
- Born: 1999 (age 25–26)
- Political party: Serbian Progressive Party

Nikola Bokan (born 1999) is a Serbian politician from the Serbian Progressive Party (SNS). He is the youngest member of the National Assembly of Serbia.

== Personal life ==
His father is the politician Tomislav Bokan.

== See also ==
- 14th National Assembly of Serbia
