= Ljubica Vraneš =

Serbian opera singer and politician

- Љубица Вранеш

Member of the National Assembly of the Republic of Serbia
- Incumbent
- Assumed office 6 February 2024

Personal details
- Born: 1979 (age 46–47)
- Party: SNS
- Education: University of Arts in Belgrade
- Profession: Opera singer

Ljubica Vraneš (Serbian Cyrillic: Љубица Вранеш; born 1979) is a Serbian mezzo-soprano opera singer, administrator, and politician. As a performer, she is best known for playing the lead role in productions of Georges Bizet's Carmen. She has been a member of Serbia's national assembly since February 2024, serving with the Serbian Progressive Party (SNS), and has been the artistic director of the National Theatre in Belgrade since July 2025.

== Opera singer ==
Vraneš is originally from Vršac in the province of Vojvodina. In her youth, she often travelled to Belgrade on weekends to watch operas, ballets, and plays. She holds a bachelor's degree and a master's degree from the Faculty of Music at the University of Arts in Belgrade, where she studied under Radmila Bakočević. In addition to Bakočević, she has credited Biserka Cvejić and Nikola Kitanovski as mentors. She became a member of the ensemble of the National Theatre in 2011 and has also performed regularly with the Romanian National Opera, Bucharest. An Austrian reviewer has described her as "perfectly cast" for the role of Carmen.

In 2022, she performed Carmen at the Oper Burg Gars in Austria, in a production that had been postponed twice due to the COVID-19 pandemic. She received excellent reviews, with one writer praising her as an "attractive, sensual, and yet not exaggerated Carmen, who found convincing role interpretation in her differentiated expression."

Vraneš has also played Carmen in several other adaptations, including a rock version in Craiova, Romania. Her other roles include Santuzza in Pietro Mascagni's Cavalleria rusticana, Eboli in Giuseppe Verdi's Don Carlos, and Delilah in Camille Saint-Saëns's Samson and Delilah. In 2019, she was part of an international cast of star performers at the Minsk International Christmas Opera Forum in Belarus.

Following a performance of Gioachino Rossini's Cinderella in December 2024, Vraneš refused to shake the hand of the conductor, who had donned a red glove in a demonstration of solidarity with Serbia's anti-government protestors.

In July 2025, Vraneš became artistic director of the National Theatre in Belgrade.

== Politician ==
Vraneš was given the sixth position on the Serbian Progressive Party's Serbia Must Not Stop electoral list in the 2023 Serbian parliamentary election. This was tantamount to election, and she was indeed elected when the list won a majority victory with 129 out of 250 seats. She has said, "I am a patriot and I will always do the best for my country. That's why I wholeheartedly support Aleksandar Vučić's policy and everything he does." It was rumoured after the election that she would be appointed as Serbia's minister of culture, although ultimately this did not happen.

In the assembly, she is a member of the culture and information committee, a deputy member of European integration committee and the committee on the diaspora and Serbs in the region, and a member of the parliamentary friendship groups with Bulgaria, Cyprus, Greece, Romania, and South Korea. One of her colleagues in the SNS parliamentary caucus is fellow operatic mezzo-soprano Jadranka Jovanović, whom she has described as a role model in her singing career.
