= Goran Spasojević =

Serbian politician

Goran Spasojević (Serbian Cyrillic: Горан Спасојевић; born 21 July 1968) is a politician in Serbia. He served in the Assembly of the City of Belgrade from 2012 to 2016, was a member of the Mladenovac municipal council from 2016 to 2020, and has been serving in the National Assembly of Serbia since 2020. Spasojević is a member of the Serbian Progressive Party.

== Private career ==
Spasojević is an agricultural technician in private life. In July 2020, he was appointed to the executive board of the Football Association of Belgrade.

== Politician ==
=== City of Belgrade ===
Spasojević received the thirty-fifth position on the Progressive Party's electoral list for the Belgrade City Assembly in the 2012 Serbian local elections and was elected when the list won thirty-seven seats. This election was won by the Democratic Party and its allies, and Spasojević served in opposition. The Democratic Party lost its majority in late 2013, and new elections were called for early 2014. Spasojević this time appeared in the forty-first position on the Progressive list and was re-elected when the list won a majority government with sixty-three mandates.

He was also elected to the Mladenovac municipal assembly in the 2016 Serbian local elections. The Progressives and their allies won a majority government in the election, and Spasojević was subsequently appointed to city council (i.e., the executive branch of the municipal government) with responsibility for sport. As he could not hold a dual mandate as an executive member and a legislator, he resigned from the Belgrade assembly in July 2016. He served on the Mladenovac municipal council until 2020.

=== Parliamentarian ===
Spasojević received the 152nd position on the Progressive Party's Aleksandar Vučić — For Our Children list in the 2020 Serbian parliamentary election and was elected when the list won a landslide majority with 188 out of 250 mandates. He is a member of the assembly committee on education, science, technological development, and the information society; a deputy member of the agriculture, forestry, and water management committee; a deputy member of the committee on spatial planning, transport, infrastructure, and telecommunications; the chair of the subcommittee on youth and sports; and a member of the parliamentary friendship groups with Austria, China, Germany, Russia, and the United States of America.
