= Zdravko Mladenović =

Serbian politician and teacher (born 1977)

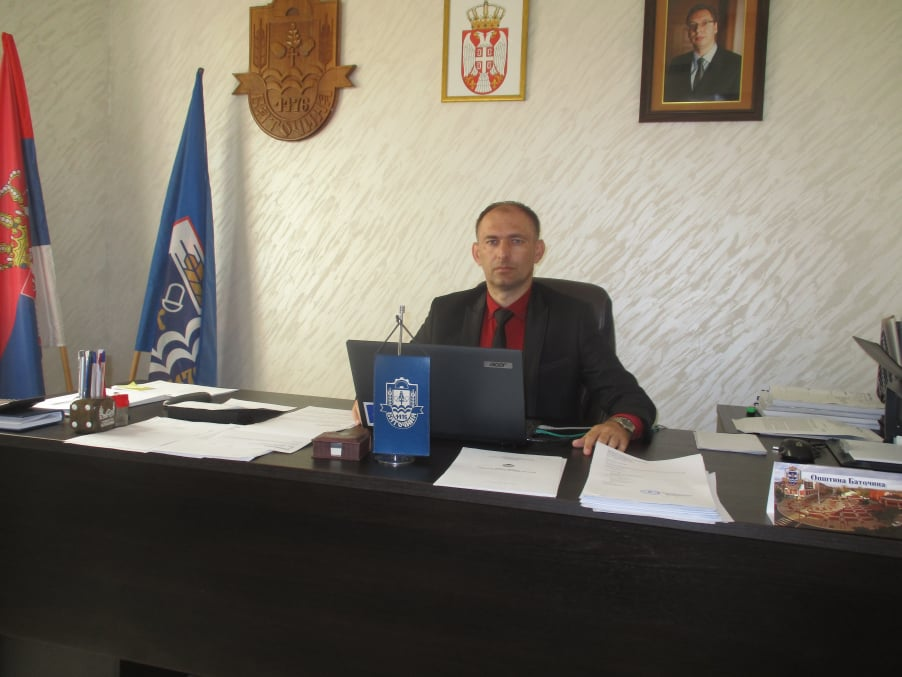
- Mladenovic in 2019

Member of National Assembly
- Incumbent
- Assumed office 23 July 2024

Personal details
- Born: 1 December 1977 (age 48) Kragujevac, Socialist Federal Republic of Yugoslavia
- Party: Serbian Progressive Party
- Other political affiliations: Serbian Renewal Movement
- Education: University of Kragujevac

Zdravko Mladenović is a Serbian mathematics teacher and politician who has been serving as a Member of the Serbian Parliament since July 23, 2024.
