= Vladimir Đorđević (politician) =

Serbian politician

- Владимир Ђорђевић

Member of the National Assembly of the Republic of Serbia
- Incumbent
- Assumed office 6 February 2024

Member of the Parliamentary Assembly of the Council of Europe
- Incumbent
- Assumed office 15 April 2024

Personal details
- Born: 23 January 1973 (age 53) Belgrade, SR Serbia, SFR Yugoslavia
- Party: POKS

Vladimir Đorđević (Serbian Cyrillic: Владимир Ђорђевић; born 23 January 1973) is a Serbian and American martial arts master, writer, filmmaker, and politician. He has served in the Serbian parliament since 2024.

Also known professionally as "Mr. V," Đorđević has described himself as a "humanist, leader of [the] Serbian diaspora [in the United States], public activist, and defender of women and children's rights against violence in schools, family, and society."

== Early life and private career ==
Đorđević was born in Belgrade, in what was then the Socialist Republic of Serbia in the Socialist Federal Republic of Yugoslavia.

He is a dual Serbian and American citizen and has lived in Fort Lauderdale, Florida. During the 2023 Serbian election, he lived in the Belgrade municipality of Rakovica and was described as a Ph.D student in cultural sciences.

== Martial arts ==
Đorđević is an aikido master and has worked as an instructor in the field. In 1999, he established the ODBRANA tactical defence school. He is also an edged weapon combat specialist and has designed his own brand of blades, known as, "Mr. V – Made in USA."

== Film work ==
Đorđević has worked in film production, directing, and fight choreography, with credits including Minor League: A Football Story (2010) [assistant director], She Wants Me (2012) [fight choreographer], and Forget the Pact (2013) [fight choreographer].

== Author ==
Đorđević has written a number of books, including:

- Arkan (2010)
- Tigrov skok (English: Tiger's Leap) (2013)
- Iz Čikaga moji (English: From Chicago, My Dears) (2021)
- Prota Sava Ninković (English: Archpriest Sava Ninković) (2023)

== Politician ==
Đorđević joined the Movement for the Restoration of the Kingdom of Serbia (POKS) on its formation in 2017 and has worked as chief of staff for party president Vojislav Mihailović. He has also been the party's coordinator and election headquarters leader for Belgrade.

He appeared in the thirty-seventh position on the party's electoral list in the 2020 Serbian parliamentary election. The list narrowly missed crossing the electoral threshold for assembly representation.

The POKS joined the National Democratic Alternative (NADA) in 2021. Later in the year, the party split into rival wings led by Mihailović and Žika Gojković; Đorđević sided with Mihailović.

Đorđević was a nominal candidate in the 2022 parliamentary election, appearing in the 249th position out of 250 on NADA's list. He also appeared in the 110th and final position on the alliance's list in the concurrent 2022 Belgrade city assembly election. Election in either of these contests was mathematically impossible, and he was not elected when the lists won fifteen and seven seats, respectively.

=== Parliamentarian ===
Đorđević received the twelfth position on NADA's electoral list for the 2023 Serbian parliamentary election and was elected when the list won thirteen mandates. He took his seat when the new assembly convened in February 2024. The Serbian Progressive Party (SNS) and its allies won the election, and the NADA representatives served in opposition.

In parliament, Đorđević has served as a member of the foreign affairs committee and the culture and information committee, a deputy member of the committee on the diaspora and Serbs in the region, a member of the joint European Union (EU)–Serbia committee on stabilization and association, and a member of Serbia's parliamentary friendship groups with Austria, Bosnia and Herzegovina, Cyprus, France, Germany, Greece, Hungary, Ireland, Japan, Malta, Sweden, the United Kingdom, the United States of America, as well as the friendship group with Italy, the Holy See, and the Sovereign Order of Malta.

Đorđević has also been a member of the Serbian parliament's delegation to the Parliamentary Assembly of the Council of Europe (PACE) since 15 April 2024. He became a member of the European Conservatives Group and Democratic Alliance (EC/DA) in June 2024; in February 2025, the group changed its name to the European Conservatives, Patriots & Affiliates (ECPA). He is a full member of the committee on migration, international protection, and economic co-operation; a full member of the committee on social affairs, health, and sustainable development; a member of the committee on the honouring of obligations and commitments by member states of the Council of Europe; and the vice-chair of the sub-committee on migrant smuggling and trafficking in human beings, as well as holding other responsibilities.

The POKS experienced another split in 2025, with Vladimir Jelić creating a new faction in opposition to Mihailović. Once again, Đorđević sided with Mihailović.

The POKS left the NADA alliance in April 2026 and created its own parliamentary group. In August of the same year, the party's parliamentarians joined the assembly group, "MPs standing with students: for election oversight."

In addition to serving in the national assembly, Đorđević was elected to the Belgrade city assembly in the 2023 city election: he appeared in the seventh position on NADA's list and became a member-elect when the list won seven seats. The city assembly was not properly constituted after the election, however, and he did not officially serve.
