= Aleksandar Jugović =

Academic, author, and politician in Serbia

Aleksandar Jugović (Serbian Cyrillic: Александар Југовић; born 2 November 1975) is an academic, author, and politician in Serbia. He has served in the National Assembly of Serbia since 2008 as a member of the Serbian Renewal Movement (Srpski pokret obnove, SPO).

== Early life and private career ==
Jugović was born in Čačak, in what was then the Socialist Republic of Serbia in the Socialist Federal Republic of Yugoslavia. He is a graduate of the University of Belgrade Faculty of Philology and is a professor of Serbian language and literature. Jugović has published the poetry collections Krv i nije voda (1995), Na kraju krajeva (1999), and Jesenim proleća (2002), the play Luna-park, and the novels DISharmonija (2005), Tri roga meseca (2006), Srpski u sto lekcija (2008), Montana (2010), Laureat (2014), Opsenar (2016), and Mora (2018).

== Politician ==
=== From 2004 to 2012 ===
Jugović received the 105th position on a combined electoral list of the SPO and New Serbia in the 2003 Serbian parliamentary election. The SPO–New Serbia alliance won twenty-two seats, and he was not chosen for his party's delegation. (From 2000 to 2011, mandates in Serbian elections were distributed at the discretion of successful parties and coalitions, and it was common practice for the mandates to be awarded out of numerical order. Jugović could have been given a mandate despite his relatively low list position, but he was not.) From 2004 to 2007, Jugović served as assistant Serbian minister of culture, working with SPO minister Dragan Kojadinović.

The SPO contested the 2007 Serbian parliamentary election on its own, and Jugović received the eighty-sixth position on its list (which was largely arranged in alphabetical order). The party did not receive enough votes to cross the electoral threshold to win representation in the assembly.

For the 2008 election, the SPO joined the Democratic Party's For a European Serbia alliance, and Jugović received the eighty-sixth position on its list. The alliance won 102 out of 250 parliamentary mandates and was subsequently able to form a coalition government. Jugović was included in the SPO's parliamentary delegation.

In October 2008, Jugović described the SPO as "the pillar that rallies the intellectual and pro-European [Union], responsible right wing" in Serbian politics, placing it in the ideological tradition of figures such as Konrad Adenauer and Charles de Gaulle. Three years later, he argued that Serbia should not celebrate July 7 as Uprising Day; his contention was that the Yugoslav partisan uprising on that date in World War II was motivated by communist ideology rather than opposition to the Axis occupation of Serbia.

In September 2009, Jugović proposed a decentralization strategy for Serbia that, among other things, would have divided Vojvodina into three regions. He supported the Ahtisaari plan in relation to the status of Kosovo and Metohija within Serbia.

=== Since 2012 ===
Serbia's electoral system was reformed in 2011, such that parliamentary mandates were assigned in numerical order to candidates on successful lists. The SPO contested the 2012 parliamentary election as part of the Preokret coalition, alternately known in English as Turnover or U-Turn. Jugović received the fifth position on its list, and was re-elected when the alliance won nineteen seats. The Serbian Progressive Party and its allies emerged from the election with the most seats, narrowly defeating the Democratic Party's Choice for a Better Life list. Initially, Jugović urged the formation of a new coalition government led by Boris Tadić and the Democratic Party. Subsequently, however, he supported an alliance between the SPO and the Progressives.

The SPO participated in the Progressive Party's Aleksandar Vučić — Future We Believe In list for the 2014 parliamentary election. Jugović received the twenty-second position on the list and was easily returned when the alliance won a majority with 158 out of 250 seats. He subsequently announced that the SPO would support Vučić's administration in the assembly. From 2012 to 2016, Jugović was the leader of the SPO–Christian Democratic Party of Serbia parliamentary group. He called for changes to the Constitution of Serbia in 2015, saying that the number of deputies in the assembly needed to be reduced and the manner of election changed. As he had done in previous years, he also called for Serbia's secret service files to be opened.

He was re-elected to another term in the National Assembly in the 2016 election after receiving the seventy-first position on the Progressive Party's coalition list, which won a second consecutive majority with 131 seats. The SPO served in the Progressive Party's caucus in the 2016–20 parliament. Jugović was a member of the parliamentary culture and information committee and a deputy member of the committee on science, education, technological development, and the information society. In 2015, he was part of Serbia's delegation to the United States of America's sixty-third annual National Prayer Breakfast in Washington, D.C.

Jugović received the ninety-eighth position on the Progressive Party's Aleksandar Vučić — For Our Children list in the 2020 election and was elected to a fifth term when the list won a landslide majority with 188 mandates. He is currently a member of the assembly's environmental protection committee.
