= Igor Bečić =

Serbian politician

- Игор Бечић
- Born: 5 June 1971 (age 55); Ravno Selo
- Education: European University in Novi Sad Union Universit
- Occupation: Politician

Igor Bečić (Serbian Cyrillic: Игор Бечић; born 5 June 1971) is Serbian politician. He has served in the National Assembly of Serbia for all but one term since 1997. Originally a member of the far-right Serbian Radical Party, he has been a member of the Serbian Progressive Party since 2008.

== Early life and career ==
Bečić was born in Ravno Selo in the municipality of Vrbas, Vojvodina, in what was then the Socialist Republic of Serbia in the Socialist Federal Republic of Yugoslavia. He served in the Yugoslav People's Army from 1990 to 1992, worked for JP "Vrbas" between 1992 and 2012, and has been an employee with Srbijagas. Bečić has a degree in economics from the European University in Novi Sad and a master's degree in industrial management from Union University.

== Politician ==
=== Parliamentarian ===
==== Radical Party ====
Bečić received the second position on the Radical Party's electoral list in Vrbas in the 1997 Serbian parliamentary election and entered parliament after the party won three mandates in the division. (From 1992 to 2000, Serbia's electoral law stipulated that one-third of assembly mandates would be assigned to candidates from successful lists in numerical order, while the remaining two-thirds would be distributed amongst other candidates at the discretion of the sponsoring parties. Bečić did not automatically receive a mandate by virtue of his list position, but he was ultimately included in the Radical delegation all the same.) The Socialist Party of Serbia and its allies won the election, and the Radicals served in opposition until joining a coalition government with the Socialists in 1998. Bečić served on the foreign affairs committee during this sitting of parliament.

Serbia's electoral system was reformed for the 2000 election, with the entire country becoming a single electoral division and all parliamentary mandates being granted to candidates on successful electoral lists at the discretion of sponsoring parties, irrespective of numerical order. Bečić received the forty-eighth position on the Radical Party list; the party won twenty-three seats, and he was not on this occasion included as part of its delegation. He was, however, included in the Radical Party's lists for the 2003, 2007, and 2008 elections and was chosen for its delegation each time. In 2006, he became part of Serbia's standing delegation to the NATO Parliamentary Assembly, where Serbia has associate membership status. The Radical Party served in opposition throughout this period.

==== Progressive Party ====
Following the 2008 election, Bečić was part of a group of twenty-one parliamentarians who left the Radical Party to form the breakaway Serbian Progressive Party, a more moderate conservative group initially led by Tomislav Nikolić. Relations between the two parties were extremely tense after the split; in early 2009, Radio B92 reported that Radical Party parliamentarian Srboljub Živanović physically attacked Bečić during a sitting of the assembly.

Serbia's electoral system was reformed once again in 2011, such that parliamentary mandates were awarded to candidates on successful lists in numerical order. Bečić received the fifty-eighth position on the Progressive Party's Let's Get Serbia Moving list in the 2012 parliamentary election and was re-elected when the list won seventy-three mandates. He was again returned in the elections of 2014 and 2016. He became a deputy speaker of the assembly after the 2014 election and served in that capacity until 2016.

Bečić continued to serve in Serbia's delegation to the NATO Parliamentary Assembly until 2014. In June 2014, while serving as head of the delegation, he gave an interview in Politika in which he stressed that Serbia was militarily neutral and had no ambitions of joining NATO. He added that Kosovo and Metohija was Serbia's greatest security challenge and said that Serbia's delegation had strongly opposed the Kosovo government's proposal that the Kosovo Security Force be transformed into an army. When asked about the Russo-Ukrainian war, he responded that the Serbian government respected the sovereignty and territorial integrity of all United Nations members but for a variety of reasons would not join in sanctions against Russia.

Bečić became the leader of Serbia's delegation to the parliamentary assembly of the Organization of the Black Sea Economic Cooperation (OBSEC) during the 2014–16 parliament. In this capacity, was an international overseer for the 2015 Azerbaijani parliamentary election.

Bečić was selected as chair of the assembly's security services control committee following the 2016 election and served in this position for the next four years. During the 2016–20 parliament, he was also a member of the defence and internal affairs committee; the leader of Serbia's parliamentary friendship groups with Ghana and Montenegro; a member of the parliamentary friendship groups with Azerbaijan, China, Germany, Portugal, Russia, the United Kingdom, and the United States of America; and, once again, the head of Serbia's delegation in the parliamentary assembly of the Organization of the Black Sea Economic Cooperation. In the latter entity, he has served as vice-president in charge of financial matters and a member of the legal and political affairs committee.

He received the seventy-third position on the Progressive Party's Aleksandar Vučić — For Our Children coalition list in the 2020 Serbian parliamentary election and was elected to an eighth term when the list won a landslide majority with 188 mandates. He continues to chair the security services control committee, serve on the defence committee, lead Serbia's delegation to the OBSEC assembly, lead Serbia's parliamentary friendship group with Montenegro, and serve in the friendship groups with Azerbaijan, China, Ghana, Russia, and the United States of America.

=== Provincial politics ===
Bečić won the Vrbas constituency seat for the Assembly of Vojvodina in the 2004 provincial assembly election. He did not seek re-election in 2008.

=== Municipal politics ===
Bečić also served several terms in the Vrbas municipal assembly. He received the lead position on the Radical Party's lists for Vrbas in the 2004 and 2008 local elections and was included in the party's delegation each time. He served as deputy president (i.e., deputy mayor) of Vrbas from 2004 to 2008 and was the speaker of the municipal assembly from 2008 to 2009.

After leaving the Radicals, he received the lead position on the Progressive Party's list for the special 2009 Vrbas municipal election and was re-elected under its banner. He did not seek re-election in 2013.

== Electoral record ==
=== Provincial (Vojvodina) ===
2004 Vojvodina assembly election Vrbas (constituency seat) - First and Second Rounds
Igor Bečić	Serbian Radical Party	3,614	24.75	7,424	54.77
Svetislav Dolapčev (incumbent)	Democratic Party	2,562	17.55	6,130	45.23
Bratislav Kažić	Democratic Party of Serbia	1,944	13.31		
Blagoje Baković	People's Democratic Party	1,941	13.29		
Miodrag Vukotić	New Social Democracy of Vojvodina	1,908	13.07		
Vladimir Kovačević	Socialist Party of Serbia	1,530	10.48		
Milan Kostić	Strength of Serbia Movement	582	3.99		
Žarko Prodanović	G17 Plus - Miroljub Labus	521	3.57		
Total valid votes		14,602	100	13,554	100
Invalid ballots		646		638	
Total votes casts		15,248	42.04	14,192	39.12
