= Snežana Rakić =

Serbian medical doctor and politician (born 1961)

- Снежана Ракић

Member of the National Assembly of the Republic of Serbia
- Incumbent
- Assumed office 6 February 2024

Personal details
- Born: 1961 (age 64–65) Belgrade, PR Serbia, FPR Yugoslavia
- Party: NPS
- Education: University of Belgrade

Snežana Rakić (Serbian Cyrillic: Снежана Ракић; born 1961) is a Serbian medical doctor and politician. She has served in the National Assembly of Serbia since February 2024 as a member of the People's Movement of Serbia (NPS).

== Early life and medical career ==
Rakić was born in Belgrade, in what was then the People's Republic of Serbia in the Federal People's Republic of Yugoslavia. She graduated from the University of Belgrade Faculty of Medicine with an average grade of 9.25, earned her master's degree in 1992, passed the specialty exam for gynecology and obstetrics in 1994, and defended her doctoral dissertation in 1996 on the topic, "Neurological development of the fetus and methods for its evaluation during intrauterine life." She was employed at the GAK Narodni Front from 1989 to 2021 and was its acting director from 2013 to 2021.

At the time she became acting director in 2013, Rakić was a member of the governing Serbian Progressive Party (SNS), and she acknowledged that her political affiliation was a contributing factor behind her appointment. When she was dismissed from the role in February 2021, it was reported in the Serbian media that she had unknowingly come to work with COVID-19 and jeopardized her co-workers and patients. She disputed this account, however, saying that she was neither sick nor in contact with patients, and contending that she was actually fired because she had by this time left the SNS to support the opposition.

From 2021 to 2023, she was medical director of the special gynecological hospital Pronatal Belgrade, and she is now employed at the Acibadem Bel Medic General Hospital in Belgrade.

She has been employed at the University of Belgrade Faculty of Medicine since 1997 and now holds the title of full professor. In 2020, she was elected to the position of full professor at the European Center for Peace and Development of the United Nations University for Peace.

== Politician ==
The People's Movement of Serbia contested the 2023 Serbian parliamentary election as part of the multi-party Serbia Against Violence coalition. Rakić appeared in the fifty-fifth position on the coalition's electoral list and was elected when it won sixty-five mandates. The Serbian Progressive Party (SNS) and its allies won a majority victory, and the NPS serves in opposition. Rakić is a member of the health and family committee, a deputy member of the committee on human and minority rights and gender equality, and a deputy member of Serbia's delegation to the Parliamentary Assembly of the Mediterranean.

The NPS contested the 2024 Serbian local elections in an alliance with several other parties from Serbia Against Violence. Rakić was the alliance's list bearer for the municipal assembly election in the Belgrade municipality of Savski Venac; she appeared in the second position on its list and was elected when it won sixteen mandates. The Progressive Party's alliance and the combined opposition lists each won eighteen seats, meaning that the makeup of the government will be decided by the assembly's only non-committed delegate, who was elected with the endorsement of a Greek national minority party.
