= Dunja Simonović Bratić =

Serbian politician

- Дуња Симоновић Братић

Vice President of the National Assembly of the Republic of Serbia
- Incumbent
- Assumed office 16 June 2025

Member of the National Assembly of the Republic of Serbia
- Incumbent
- Assumed office 20 May 2021

Member of the Parliamentary Assembly of the Council of Europe
- Incumbent
- Assumed office 23 January 2023

Substitute Member of the Parliamentary Assembly of the Council of Europe
- In office 10 October 2022 – 22 January 2023

Personal details
- Born: 1981 (age 44–45) Belgrade, SR Serbia, SFR Yugoslavia
- Party: SPS

Dunja Simonović Bratić (Serbian Cyrillic: Дуња Симоновић Братић; born 1981) is a Serbian politician. She has served in the Serbian parliament since 2021 and has been one of its vice-presidents (i.e., deputy speakers) since June 2025. Simonović Bratić is a member of the Socialist Party of Serbia (SPS).

== Early life and career ==
Simonović Bratić was born in Belgrade, in what was then the Socialist Republic of Serbia in the Socialist Federal Republic of Yugoslavia. She holds a bachelor's degree in Philosophy.

She is the founder of the Sreten Stojanović Foundation and was the editor for Stojanović's Ispovesti (English: Confessions), published in 2014.

== Politician ==
Simonović Bratić received the sixtieth position on the Socialist Party's electoral list in the 2014 Serbian parliamentary election. The list won forty-four seats, and she was not elected.

=== Parliamentarian ===
Simonović Bratić was later given the thirty-fifth position on the SPS's list for the 2020 parliamentary election and was not initially elected when the list won thirty-two seats. Following the resignations of other Socialist parliamentarians, however, she was assigned a mandate on 19 May 2021 and took her seat in the assembly the following day. The Socialists were part of Serbia's coalition government led by the Serbian Progressive Party (SNS) at this time, and she served as a government supporter. In her first term, she was a member of the education committee (Note: Formally known as the Committee on Education, Science, Technological Development, and the Information Society.) and the culture and information committee, as well as the parliamentary friendship groups with Bahrain, Belarus, Belgium, Croatia, Cuba, Germany, the Holy See, India, Latvia, Luxembourg, the Netherlands, Norway, Portugal, Qatar, Russia, Spain, the United Kingdom, and the United States of America.

Simonović Bratić was promoted to the thirteenth position on the SPS's list in the 2022 Serbian parliamentary election and was re-elected when the list won thirty-one seats. The SPS remained part of Serbia's coalition government after the election. In her second term, Simonović Bratić was a member of the foreign affairs committee and the European integration committee; a deputy member of the culture and information committee, the administrative committee, (Note: Formally known as the Committee on Administrative, Budgetary, Mandate, and Immunity Issues.) and the committee on the rights of the child; the leader of Serbia's parliamentary friendship group with Belgium; and a member of the friendship groups with Belarus, Cameroon, China, Cyprus, Georgia, Hungary, Israel, Paraguay, Russia, Saudi Arabia, Slovenia, Spain, Trinidad and Tobago, and Venezuela.

She was also appointed as substitute member of Serbia's delegation to the Parliamentary Assembly of the Council of Europe (PACE), taking her seat on 10 October 2022. During this time, she served as an alternate member on the committee on social affairs, health, and sustainable development. On 23 January 2023, she was promoted to a full member of Serbia's delegation and became a full member of the social affairs committee, a full member of the committee on political affairs and democracy, and an alternate member of the sub-committee on external relations. In January 2024, her term on the external relations sub-committee ended and she became a full member of the sub-committee on the Western Balkans.

For the 2023 Serbian parliamentary election, Simonović Bratić received the fifteenth position on the Socialist Party's list and was re-elected even as the list fell to only eighteen seats overall. Once again, the party participated in a SNS-led coalition government after the election. Simonović Bratić is currently a member of the foreign affairs committee, the culture and information committee, the European integration committee, and the committee on the rights of the child, as well as being the leader of Serbia's friendship group with Japan and a member of the friendship groups with Armenia, Austria, Bahrain, the Benelux countries, Bosnia and Herzegovina, China, Germany, Ghana, Greece, Hungary, Nigeria, Norway, Spain, Tanzania, Turkey, and the United Kingdom. On 16 June 2025, she became one of six vice-presidents of the national assembly, succeeding fellow Socialist Snežana Paunović.

Simonović Bratić was also appointed to a second term as a full member of the PACE following the 2023 election. She continues to serve on the committee on political affairs and democracy and in January 2026 was appointed as the vice-chair of the sub-committee on the Western Balkans. She is also a member of the committee on culture, science, education, and media. Throughout her time in the PACE, she has served with the Socialists, Democrats and Greens Group (SOC).

In March 2024, the PACE political affairs and democracy committee voted to recommend the admission of the Republic of Kosovo to the PACE. Simonović Bratić was one of a minority of delegates to vote against the motion. SPS leader Ivica Dačić subsequently described the motion as "shameful and scandalous" and a threat to Serbia's sovereignty.

Simonović Bratić has accused deans and professors at Belgrade's Faculty of Philosophy of cynically manipulating Serbia's student protests for their own ends, specifically due to fear of competition following Serbian president Aleksandar Vučić's announcement that universities from other countries would be permitted in Serbia.
