= Marija Zdravković =

Serbian cardiologist and politician

- Марија Здравковић

Member of the National Assembly of the Republic of Serbia
- Incumbent
- Assumed office 6 February 2024
- In office 1 August 2022 – 25 October 2022

Member of the City Assembly of Belgrade
- In office 11 June 2022 – 11 June 2022

Personal details
- Born: 18 December 1973 (age 52) Belgrade, SR Serbia, SFR Yugoslavia
- Party: SNS

Marija Zdravković (Serbian Cyrillic: Марија Здравковић; 18 December 1973) is a Serbian medical doctor, administrator, and народна посланица. She has been the director of the hospital Bežanijska Kosa in Belgrade since 2014 and is currently serving her second term in Serbia's national assembly. Zdravković is a member of the Serbian Progressive Party (SNS).

== Early life and medical career ==
Zdravković was born in Belgrade, in what was then the Socialist Republic of Serbia in the Socialist Federal Republic of Yugoslavia. She graduated from the University of Belgrade Faculty of Medicine in 1998 with a 9.94 grade average, received a master's degree in cardiology in 2005, earned a Ph.D. in sports cardiology in 2010, and afterward completed a two-year post-doctoral studies program at the University of Zürich.

She was appointed as a clinical assistant at the Faculty of Medicine in 2012 and was named as an associate professor of internal medicine - cardiology in 2019. She became director of Bežanijska Kosa in September 2014. Zdravković is credited as being the first cardiologist in Serbia to introduce cardiomagnetic resonance into regular clinical practice.

== Politician ==
Zdravković led the SNS's electoral list for New Belgrade in the 2020 Serbian local elections and was elected when the list won twenty-two out of forty-nine mandates. Aleksandar Šapić's Serbian Patriotic Alliance (SPAS) narrowly defeated the SNS in this election, and the Progressives did not initially participate in the local government. In 2021, the SPAS merged into the Progressive Party.

=== Parliamentarian and city assembly member ===
Zdraković received the sixth position on the SNS-led Together We Can Do Everything list in the 2022 Serbian parliamentary election and the second position (after Śapić) on the list in the concurrent 2022 Belgrade City Assembly election. In both cases, her placement was tantamount to election; she was elected to the national assembly when the SNS's alliance won 120 out of 250 seats and to the city assembly when it won forty-eight out of 110 seats.

She resigned from the city assembly on 11 June 2022 (i.e., the day that it convened) and from the national assembly on 25 October 2022. During her brief first parliamentary term, she was a member of the health and family committee and the committee on the rights of the child, as well as being a deputy member of the labour committee (Note: Formally known as the Committee on Labour, Social Issues, Social Inclusion, and Poverty Reduction.) and the environmental protection committee.

Zdravković later appeared in the fourth position on the SNS's Serbia Must Not Stop list in the 2023 Serbian parliamentary election and was elected to a second term when the list won a majority victory with 129 seats. She is once again a member of the health and family committee and the committee on the rights of the child and a deputy member of the environmental protection committee. In addition, she is the leader of Serbia's parliamentary friendship group with Germany and a member of the friendship groups with Austria, Canada, China, Cyprus, France, Greece, Malta, Russia, Spain, Switzerland, the United Arab Emirates, the United Kingdom, the United States of America, and Uzbekistan, as well as the friendship group with Italy, the Holy See, and Sovereign Order of Malta.

She was re-elected to the New Belgrade municipal assembly in the 2024 Serbian local elections after again receiving the lead position on the SNS coalition's list. The list won a controversial majority victory with twenty-five out of forty-nine seats.

In November 2025, Zdravković oversaw a somewhat awkward meeting at the Serbian national assembly with German politician Boris Mijatović, the deputy chair of Germany's Southeast European parliamentary friendship group. Mijatović later said that the meeting lasted considerably longer than he expected and that Zdravković had immediately shut it down when he criticized the amount of time Serbian president Aleksandar Vučić received on Serbian television relative to the country's opposition leaders. According to Mijatović, Zdravković told him that it was not appropriate for him to criticize Vučić (which, in his view, he did not do).
