= Dragan Marković Markoni =

Administrator and politician in Serbia

Dragan Marković (Serbian Cyrillic: Драган Марковић; born 1965), known as Dragan Marković Markoni, is an administrator and politician in Serbia. He was for many years a high-ranking member of Yugoslavia's State Security Service (Resor državne bezbednosti, RDB) and Serbia's successor Security Intelligence Agency (Bezbednosno-informativna agencija, BIA). Marković has served in the National Assembly of Serbia since 2020 as a member of the Party of United Pensioners of Serbia (PUPS).

== Early life and intelligence career ==
Marković was born in Smederevska Palanka, in what was then the Socialist Republic of Serbia in the Socialist Federal Republic of Yugoslavia. He trained as a special education teacher. He joined the RDB in 1992 and rose to a high-ranking position in the agency. Marković was a state secretary in Serbia's ministry of internal affairs from 2008 to 2012 and subsequently became BIA deputy director. He briefly served as acting BIA director between 5 September and 25 October 2013. Media reports from this period indicate that Socialist Party of Serbia leader Ivica Dačić, then the prime minister of Serbia, supported Marković to lead Serbia's police services but that his candidacy was opposed by the Serbian Progressive Party. Marković resigned as BIA deputy director in April 2014 and instead became an adviser to the director. He was later assigned to oversee the BIA center in Niš.

In a 2019 interview, Marković said that the BIA had in 2012 prevented an attempt by Rodoljub Milović, then the director of the Criminal Police Directorate (Uprava kriminalističke policije, UKP), to monitor the communications of Aleksandar Vučić. Marković also accused Milović of hiring a convicted criminal to monitor his activities on an official visit to Vienna and said that he had filed a criminal complaint against Milović on this basis.

He became acting director of FK Radnički Niš in 2017.

== Political career ==
The PUPS contested the 2020 Serbian parliamentary election on the electoral list of the Serbian Progressive Party. Marković received the 101st position on the list and was elected when it won a landslide majority with 188 mandates. Although he was described in an August 2020 news article as an independent candidate who had been endorsed by the PUPS, he subsequently identified as a member of the party.

Marković is a member of the assembly's defence and internal affairs committee, the environmental protection committee, and the committee on the judiciary, public administration, and local self government; a deputy member of the committee on labour, social issues, social inclusion, and poverty reduction; a member of Serbia's delegation to the Parliamentary Dimension of the Central European Initiative; and a member of Serbia's parliamentary friendship groups with Austria, Bosnia and Herzegovina, Canada, China, the Czech Republic, Greece, Hungary, Ireland, Israel, Italy, Jordan, Russia, Slovenia, Spain, Syria, Turkey, and the United Arab Emirates.
