= Jasmina Palurović =

Serbian politician

Jasmina Palurović (Serbian Cyrillic: Јасмина Палуровић; born 5 June 1972) is a politician in Serbia. She has served as mayor of Kruševac since 2017 and also briefly served in the National Assembly of Serbia in August 2020. Palurović is a member of the Serbian Progressive Party.

== Early life and career ==
Palurović was born in Kruševac, in what was then the Socialist Republic of Serbia in the Socialist Federal Republic of Yugoslavia. She graduated from the technical faculty at the University of Kragujevac in Čačak and worked in the production sector before entering political life.

== Politician ==
=== Municipal politics ===
Palurović received the eighteenth position on the Progressive Party's electoral list for the Kruševac municipal assembly in the 2012 Serbian local elections and was elected when the list won eighteen mandates. She was appointed as deputy mayor in 2014 and served in the role for the next two years. Palurović was promoted to the third position on the Progressive list in the 2016 elections and was re-elected when the list won a landslide majority victory with fifty-two of seventy seats. She served as president (i.e., speaker) of the city assembly from 2016 to 2017.

On 25 December 2017, Palurović was elected by the assembly as Kruševac's new mayor, replacing Dragi Nestorović, who had died in office. She led the party's list in the 2020 local elections and was re-elected when the list again won fifty-two mandates. Shortly after the election, she inaugurated a statue of Medieval Serbian leader Stefan Lazarević, who hailed from the Kruševac.

She was appointed to a new term as mayor on 18 August 2020.

=== Parliamentarian ===
Palurović received the forty-fourth position on the Progressive Party's list in the 2020 Serbian parliamentary election and was elected when the list won a landslide majority with 188 mandates. She resigned from the assembly on 20 August 2020 as she could not hold a dual mandate as mayor.
