= Emese Úri =

Serbian doctor and politician

- Úri Emese

Member of the National Assembly of the Republic of Serbia
- Incumbent
- Assumed office 6 February 2024
- In office 3 August 2020 – 1 August 2022

Personal details
- Born: 15 May 1967 (age 58) Vršac, SAP Vojvodina, SR Serbia, SFR Yugoslavia
- Party: VMSZ

Emese Úri (Serbian Cyrillic: Емеше Ури, romanized: Emeše Uri; born 15 May 1967) is a Serbian medical doctor, administrator, and politician from the country's Hungarian community, currently serving her second term in the Serbian national assembly. Úri is a member of the Alliance of Vojvodina Hungarians (VMSZ).

== Early life and career ==
Úri was born in Vršac, in what was then the Socialist Autonomous Province of Vojvodina in the Socialist Republic of Serbia, Socialist Federal Republic of Yugoslavia. She was raised in the Hungarian community of Jermenovci in nearby Plandište and attended medical high school in Zrenjanin. Úri graduated with a general medical degree from the Medical Faculty in Novi Sad, began working at the Sombor health centre in 2000, and became director of the centre in 2013.

== Politician ==
Úri was given the sixth position on the VMSZ's electoral list for Sombor in the 2016 Serbian local elections and was not elected when the list won three seats.

=== Parliamentarian ===
Úri received the eighth position on the VMSZ's list in the 2020 Serbian parliamentary election. The party made a concerted effort to increase its vote in this election, and Úri received her first assembly mandate when the list won a record nine seats. In her first term, she was a member of the labour committee (Note: Formally known as the Committee on Labour, Social Issues, Social Inclusion, and Poverty Reduction.) and the health and family committee, a deputy member of the education committee (Note: Formally known as the Committee on Education, Science, Technological Development, and the Information Society.) and the committee on the rights of the child, and a member of the parliamentary friendship groups with China and Switzerland. The VMSZ supported Serbia's government led by the Serbian Progressive Party (SNS) during this time.

She also appeared in the sixth position on the VMSZ's list for Sombor in the 2020 Serbian local elections, which were held concurrently with the parliamentary election. The list won five seats, and she was not elected. She had the opportunity to enter the assembly later in 2000 as the replacement for another delegate, but she declined her mandate, and the next candidate on the list received it instead.

Úri was promoted to the seventh position on the VMSZ's list in the 2022 parliamentary election and was not re-elected when the list fell to five seats.

She was promoted again to the fifth position in the 2023 parliamentary election and was elected to a second term when the VMSZ won six mandates. She took her seat when the assembly convened in February 2024. Úri is now a member of the health and family committee and the committee on the rights of the child, a deputy member of the culture and information committee, and a member of the friendship group with Slovakia.

She was a nominal VMSZ candidate in the 2024 local elections, appearing in the eighth position on the party's list in Sombor. She was not elected when the list won four seats.
