= Zoran Stojanović =

Serbian politician

Zoran T. Stojanović (Serbian Cyrillic: Зоран T. Стојановић; born 18 July 1968) is a politician in Serbia. He was a member of the National Assembly of Serbia from 2005 to 2007 and the deputy mayor of Vladičin Han from 2008 to 2013. He is currently a member of the Vladičin Han municipal assembly. Stojanović is a member of the Democratic Party of Serbia (Demokratska stranka Srbije, DSS).

== Private career ==
Stojanović was born in Vladičin Han, in what was then the Socialist Republic of Serbia in the Socialist Federal Republic of Yugoslavia. He was raised in the community, graduated from the University of Niš Faculty of Law, and returned to Vladičin Han to work as a lawyer.

== Politician ==
=== Parliamentarian ===
Stojanović was given the eighty-fifth position on the DSS's electoral list in 2003 Serbian parliamentary election. The list won fifty-three mandates, and Stojanović was not initially selected for his party's assembly delegation. (From 2000 to 2011, mandates in Serbian elections were awarded to sponsoring parties and coalitions rather than individual candidates, and it was common practice for the mandates to be assigned out of numerical order. Stojanović could have been selected as a DSS delegate at the start of parliament despite his list position, but he was not.) He was, however, given a mandate on 19 April 2005 as the replacement for another party member. The DSS was the dominant party in Serbia's coalition government during this time, the Stojanović served in the assembly as a government supporter.

The DSS contested the 2007 and 2008 parliamentary elections in an alliance with New Serbia. Stojanović appeared on the alliance's electoral list both times, though he was not chosen for a mandate on either occasion.

Serbia's electoral system was reformed in 2011, such that mandates were awarded in numerical order to candidates on successful lists. Stojanović was given the 101st position on the DSS's list in the 2012 parliamentary election and was not elected when the list won only twenty-one mandates. He appeared in the 209th position on the DSS's list in the 2014 parliamentary election, in which the party failed to cross the electoral threshold, and in the forty-second position on a combined DSS-Dveri list in the 2016 election, in which the list won only thirteen mandates.

The DSS contested the 2020 Serbian parliamentary election as the dominant party in the METLA 2000 alliance, and Stojanović appeared in the eleventh position on its list. Direct election from this position was plausible, but the list did not ultimately cross the threshold to win any mandates.

As of 2021, Stojanović is a member of the DSS's executive board.

=== Municipal politics ===
Stojanović was a founding member of the DSS in Vladičin Han in 2000 and has served several terms in its municipal assembly. Following the 2008 Serbian local elections, he was appointed as deputy mayor of the municipality. He led the local DSS list in the 2012 local elections; the list won three mandates, the DSS once again participated in the local coalition government, and Stojanović was appointed to a second term as deputy mayor after the election. In late 2013, a shift in municipal alliances led to Stojanović being replaced as deputy mayor and returning to the municipal assembly.

The DSS–Dveri list failed to cross the electoral threshold in Vladičin Han in the 2016 local elections, and Stojanović, who appeared at the head of the list, lost his seat in the local assembly. He led the METLA 2000 list for Vladičin Han in the 2020 local elections and was re-elected when the list won a single mandate.
