= Nikola Lazić =

Serbian culturologist and politician

- Никола Лазић
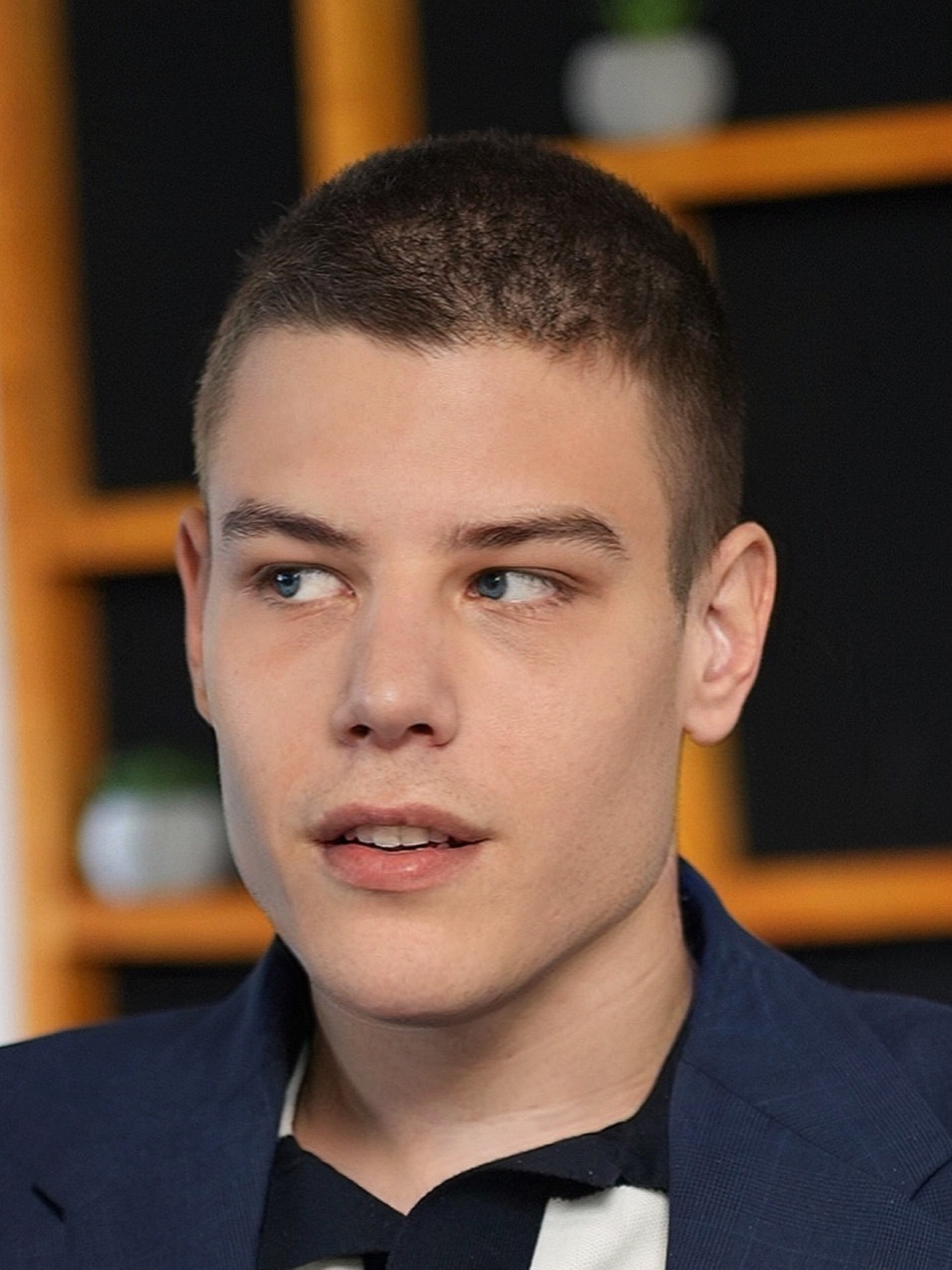

Member of the National Assembly
- Incumbent
- Assumed office 1 May 2024
- In office 3 August 2020 – 1 August 2022

Personal details
- Born: 26 May 1999 (age 27) Belgrade, Federal Republic of Yugoslavia
- Party: Serbian Progressive Party
- Education: Culturologist
- Alma mater: Megatrend University

Nikola Lazić (Serbian Cyrillic: Никола Лазић; born 26 May 1997) is a Serbian culturologist and politician who has served as deputy in the National Assembly of Serbia since 2024. Lazić previously served as deputy in the National Assembly from 2020 to 2022. He is a member of Serbian Progressive Party.

== Biography ==
Lazić lives in Stari Grad, Belgrade. He graduated from a medical high school in Belgrade and is a culturologist after finish the Faculty of Media and Communications at Megatrend University. Lazić is currently in his master's studies at the Faculty of Political Sciences. His mother, Verica Lazić, has served as an advisor to president of Serbia Aleksandar Vučić on social and health issues since 2017.

Lazić received the 160th position on the Progressive Party's Aleksandar Vučić — For Our Children electoral list in the 2020 Serbian parliamentary election and was elected when the list won a landslide majority with 188 out of 250 mandates. He was a member of the assembly committee on the rights of the child; a deputy member of the committee on education, science, technological development, and the information society; a deputy member of the committee on administrative, budgetary, mandate, and immunity issues; a member of the subcommittee on youth and sports the leader of Serbia's parliamentary friendship group with Uganda; and a member of the parliamentary friendship groups with Cuba, Cyprus, France, Greece, Italy, Japan, Montenegro, Spain, and Turkey.

Lazić became a deputy again on 1 May 2024 after resignations of other SNS members that went to serve in the government.
