= Nevena Veinović =

Serbian politician

Nevena Veinović (Serbian Cyrillic: Невена Веиновић; born 1996) is a politician in Serbia. She has served in the National Assembly of Serbia since 2020 as a member of the Serbian Progressive Party.

== Private career ==
Veinović has a Bachelor of Laws degree and lives in the village of Ljutovo in Subotica. From 2019 to 2020, she was a member of the council of the Technical College of Vocational Studies in Subotica.

== Politician ==
Veinović has served on the legal team of the Progressive Party's municipal board in Subotica. She was given the 151st position on the Progressive Party's Aleksandar Vučić — For Our Children list in the 2020 Serbian parliamentary election and was elected when the list won a landslide majority with 188 out of 250 mandates. She is a member of the assembly committee on constitutional and legislative issues; a deputy member of the committee on the judiciary, public administration, and local self-government; a deputy member of the committee on spatial planning, transport, infrastructure, and telecommunications; the head of Serbia's parliamentary friendship group with Cape Verde; and a member of the parliamentary friendship groups with Bosnia and Herzegovina, Croatia, Greece, Hungary, Montenegro, Russia, Switzerland, the United Arab Emirates, and Ukraine.
