= Ninoslav Erić =

Serbian politician

Ninoslav Erić (Serbian Cyrillic: Нинослав Ерић; born 18 February 1976) is a politician in Serbia. He was the mayor of Ćuprija from 2013 to 2020, when he was elected to the National Assembly of Serbia. Erić is a member of the Serbian Progressive Party.

== Private career ==
Erić was born in Ćuprija, in what was then the Socialist Republic of Serbia in the Socialist Federal Republic of Yugoslavia. He holds a bachelor's degree and a master's degree (2012) in economics from the University of Niš Faculty of Economics and has worked for Agroinvest fond.

== Politician ==
=== Municipal ===
Erić was elected to the Ćuprija municipal assembly in the 2012 Serbian local elections at the head of an independent electoral list called Morava grad. The election did not produce a clear winner. The Morava grad movement won five seats (out of thirty-seven) and collectively joined the Progressive Party after the campaign. On 21 June 2013, after a period of instability, a new municipal coalition government was formed by the Progressive Party and the rival Democratic Party, with Erić as mayor.

Erić led the Progressive Party list to majority victories in the 2016 and 2020 local elections, with the party in each instance winning thirty mandates. In August 2020, Erić and Serbian president Aleksandar Vučić announced a major renovation project for Ćuprija's general hospital. This was one of his last acts as mayor; he was required to stand down shortly thereafter as he could not hold a dual mandate as mayor and a parliamentarian. He was instead selected as president (i.e., speaker) of the municipal assembly in August 2020.

=== Member of the National Assembly ===
Erić received the 122nd position on the Progressive Party's Aleksandar Vučić — For Our Children list in the 2020 parliamentary election and was elected when the list won a landslide majority with 188 mandates. He is a member of the parliamentary friendship groups with Algeria, Argentina, Armenia, Australia, Austria, Azerbaijan, Bahrain, Belarus, Belgium, Bosnia and Herzegovina, Brazil, Bulgaria, Burundi, Cambodia, Canada, Chile, China, Croatia, Cuba, Cyprus, the Czech Republic, the Democratic Republic of the Congo, Denmark, Egypt, Estonia, Finland, France, Georgia, Germany, Greece, Hungary, India, Indonesia, Iraq, Iran, Ireland, Italy, Japan, Jordan, Kazakhstan, Kenya, Kuwait, Lesotho, Liechtenstein, Luxembourg, Malta, Mexico, Montenegro, Morocco, Myanmar, Nepal, the Netherlands, North Korea, North Macedonia, Norway, the Philippines, Poland, Portugal, Qatar, Romania, Russia, Saudi Arabia, Slovakia, Slovenia, South Africa, South Korea, Spain, the countries of Sub-Saharan Africa, Sweden, Switzerland, Tunisia, Turkey, Ukraine, the United Arab Emirates, the United Kingdom, the United States of America, and Venezuela.
