= Dragana Radinović =

Serbian politician

Dragana Radinović (Serbian Cyrillic: Драгана Радиновић; born 30 May 1976) is a politician in Serbia. She has been a member of the local government in Inđija and was elected to the National Assembly of Serbia in the 2020 Serbian parliamentary election. Radinović is a member of the Serbian Progressive Party.

== Early life and private career ==
Radinović was born in Novi Sad, Vojvodina, in what was then the Socialist Republic of Serbia in the Socialist Federal Republic of Yugoslavia. She now lives in the village of Krčedin in the Inđija municipality. In private life, she is an engineer specializing in food technology.

== Politician ==
=== Municipal politics ===
Radinović received the sixth position on the Progressive Party's electoral list for the Inđija municipal assembly in the 2016 Serbian local elections and was elected when the list won a majority victory with twenty-one out of thirty-seven seats. She was subsequently chosen as the municipality's deputy mayor. She was re-elected in the 2020 local elections after receiving the second position on the Progressive Party's list, which won twenty-five mandates.

Radinović received the thirty-fifth position on the Progressive Party's list in the 2020 Serbian parliamentary election and was elected when the list won a landslide majority with 188 mandates. She is now a member of the assembly's environmental protection committee and the committee on human and minority rights and gender equality; a deputy member of the committee on labour, social issues, social inclusion, and poverty reduction; and a member of Serbia's parliamentary friendship groups with Argentina, Austria, Belarus, Brazil, Canada, China, Cuba, Cyprus, Denmark, Egypt, France, Germany, Greece, Hungary, India, Ireland, Israel, Italy, Japan, Mexico, Norway, Portugal, Russia, Slovenia, Spain, Sweden, Tunisia, Turkey, the United Kingdom, and the United States of America.
