= Nenad Krstić (politician) =

Serbian politician (born 1980)

Nenad Krstić (Serbian Cyrillic: Ненад Крстић; born 1980) is a politician in Serbia. He served as mayor of Trgovište from 2013 to 2020 and has been a member of the National Assembly of Serbia since 2020. Krstić is a member of the Serbian Progressive Party.

== Early life and career ==
Krstić was born in Trgovište, in what was then the Socialist Republic of Serbia in the Socialist Federal Republic of Yugoslavia. He has a bachelor's degree in economics.

== Politician ==
=== Early municipal career ===
Krstić was a member of the Trgovište municipal assembly during the 2008–12 term, initially serving with the party New Serbia. He was the deputy president (i.e., deputy speaker) of the assembly in early 2010. He joined the Progressive Party later in the year and was promoted to assembly president when a new local coalition government was formed on 8 June 2010.

The Progressives contested the 2012 local election in Trgovište in an alliance with the Reformist Party. Krstić was by this time the local leader of the Progressives; he appeared in the lead position on the alliance's electoral list and was re-elected when the list won four mandates. He was again chosen as president of the assembly after the election.

=== Mayor ===
Krstić was selected as mayor of Trgovište by the assembly in March 2013 following the death of the previous office-holder, Radoslav Jordanović. The journal Blic ran a profile piece on Krstić shortly thereafter, noting that both his grandfather Bogosav and father Aleksandar had previously held the same office. Trgovište is one of the poorest municipalities in Serbia, and Krstić voluntarily reduced his salary on becoming mayor.

He appeared in the lead position on the Progressive Party's list in the 2016 Serbian local elections and was re-elected when the list won a landslide majority with twenty-one out of twenty-five seats. In a 2017 interview with Politika, he said that his top priority as mayor was ending the migration of people from the municipality and that his government had introduced a generous child support policy to better ensure this outcome.

In the 2020 Serbian local elections, the only opposition to the Progressive Party list came from the far-right Serbian Radical Party. Krstić led the Progressives to an absolute victory, with the list winning all twenty-five available seats.

He declared a state of emergency in Trgovište in July 2020 due to the proliferation of COVID-19 in the community. This was one of his last acts as mayor; he stood down shortly thereafter as he was not permitted to hold a dual mandate as a member of the national assembly.

=== Member of the National Assembly ===
Krstić received the 208th position on the Progressive Party's Let's Get Serbia Moving electoral list in the 2012 Serbian parliamentary election. The list won seventy-three mandates, and he was not returned. He was subsequently given the 173rd position on the party's Aleksandar Vučić — For Our Children list in the 2020 parliamentary election and was elected when the list won a landslide majority with 188 out of 250 mandates.

He is a member of the assembly committee on labour, social issues, social inclusion, and poverty reduction; a deputy member of the committee on the judiciary, public administration, and local self-government; a deputy member of the committee on the economy, regional development, trade, tourism, and energy; the leader of Serbia's parliamentary friendship group with Ecuador; and a member of the parliamentary friendship groups with Bulgaria, Croatia, Greece, Montenegro, North Macedonia, and Russia.
