= Jovan Kolundžija =

Serbian violinist and politician

- Јован Колунџија

Member of the National Assembly of the Republic of Serbia
- Incumbent
- Assumed office 3 August 2020

Personal details
- Born: 4 October 1948 (age 78) Belgrade, PR Serbia, FPR Yugoslavia
- Party: Ind. (SNS endorsement)
- Education: University of Arts in Belgrade
- Profession: Classical Violinist

Jovan Kolundžija (Serbian Cyrillic: Јован Колунџија; born 4 October 1948) is a Serbian violin maestro and politician. He has served in Serbia's national assembly since 2020 as an independent representative endorsed by the Serbian Progressive Party (SNS).

== Early life and musical career ==
Kolundžija was born in Belgrade, in what was then the People's Republic of Serbia in the People's Federal Republic of Yugoslavia. He earned a master's degree in music at the University of Arts in Belgrade and later studied with Henryk Szeryng. He performs on a 1745 Guarnerius.

Kolundžija is the founder of the Guarnerius Centre for Fine Arts in Belgrade, which the Serbian government recognized as an institution of cultural significance in 2013. He has participated in more than four thousand concerts, including performances at Carnegie Hall and the Tchaikovsky Concert Hall.

In 1994, Kolundžija was the featured violinist for a four-day program called The Ten Magnificents, which comprised performances of concertos by J.S. Bach, Antonio Vivaldi, Wolfgang Amadeus Mozart, Felix Mendelssohn, Max Bruch, Édouard Lalo, Henryk Wieniawski, Pyotr Ilyich Tchaikovsky, Ludwig van Beethoven, and Johannes Brahms. In 2008, he presented a program called Do You Love Beethoven? in Belgrade, performing all of Beethoven's sonatas for solo violin and piano.

He is the brother of the pianist Nada Kolundžija, with whom he has frequently performed.

== Politician ==
Kolundžija received the third position on the Progressive Party's For Our Children electoral list in the 2020 Serbian parliamentary election. This was tantamount to election, and he was indeed elected when the list won a landslide majority with 188 out of 250 seats. In announcing his candidacy, he said he would work in a non-partisan capacity for meaningful changes in Serbia's cultural sector. In his first term, he was a member of the assembly's culture and information committee and a deputy member of Serbia's delegation to the Parliamentary Assembly of the Mediterranean.

He appeared in the ninth position on the SNS's Together We Can Do Everything list in the 2022 Serbian parliamentary election and was re-elected when the list won 120 seats, falling below majority status but remaining the dominant presence in the assembly. He did not have any committee responsibilities in the term that followed, although he was the leader of Serbia's parliamentary friendship group with Eswatini.

Kolundžija was given the seventh position on the SNS's list in the 2023 parliamentary election and was elected to a third term when the list returned to majority status with 129 seats. He is once again a member of the culture and information committee and a member of the friendship group with Eswatini.

He is now seeking re-election in the 2026 parliamentary election as the eighth-ranked candidate on the SNS-led United Serbia (US) electoral list.
