= Nevena Đurić =

Serbian politician (born 1993)

- Невена Ђурић
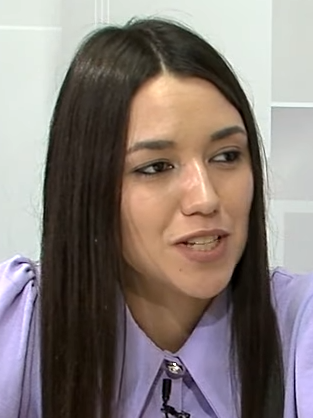
- Đurić in 2021

Vice-President of National Assembly
- Incumbent
- Assumed office 19 March 2025
- President: Ana Brnabić

Member of the National Assembly
- Incumbent
- Assumed office 3 August 2020

Personal details
- Born: 10 October 1993 (age 33) Kruševac, FR Yugoslavia
- Party: SNS

Nevena Đurić (Serbian: Невена Ђурић, born 10 October 1993) is a Serbian politician who has served in the National Assembly as a member of the Serbian Progressive Party (SNS) since 2021, and vice-president of the assembly since 2025. She is deputy chairwoman of the Serbia Must Not Stop parliamentary group, one of vice-presidents of SNS, and has been active in the leadership of the SNS in Kruševac.

== Early life ==
Đurić was born in Kruševac, FR Yugoslavia, on 10 October 1993. She graduated from a medical high school in Kruševac and from the University of Kragujevac with a master's degree in mathematics and worked as a mathematics professor.

== Career ==
Đurić was a member of the Serbian Progressive Party's information council in Kruševac. She was elected as one of the vice presidents of the Main Board of the SNS in 2021, and was president of the City Board of the SNS in Kruševac.

In the 2020 election Đurić won a seat in the National Assembly and was reelected in 2022 as the 14th candidate on the electoral list. She is a member of the Serbia Must Not Stop parliamentary group and is deputy head of the group. She was elected vice president of the assembly with the unanimous support of all 146 members on 19 March 2025.

During Đurić's tenure in the assembly she has served on the Foreign Affairs and Rights of the Child committees. She is chair of the Culture and Information committee. She is a deputy member in Serbia's delegation to the parliamentary assembly of the Organization for Security and Co-operation in Europe.
