= Ostra (Čačak) =

- Village
- Location within Serbia
- Coordinates: 43°54′20″N 20°29′37″E
- Country: Serbia
- District: Moravica District
- Municipality: Čačak

Area
  - Total: 24.06 km^{2} (9.29 sq mi)
- Elevation: 288 m (945 ft)

Population (2011)
  - Total: 918
  - Density: 38.2/km^{2} (98.8/sq mi)
- Time zone: UTC+1 (CET)
  - Summer (DST): UTC+2 (CEST)

Ostra is a village in the municipality of Čačak, Serbia. According to the 2011 census, the village has a population of 918 people.
