= Nebojša Bakarec =

Serbian politician

- Небојша Бакарец
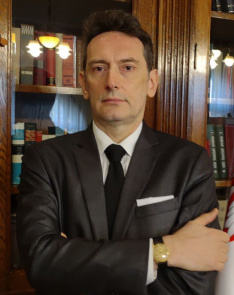

Personal details
- Born: 21 April 1963 (age 63) Osijek, SR Croatia, SFR Yugoslavia
- Party: DS (1990–1992); DSS (1992–2015); NDSS (2015–2017); SNS (2017–present)
- Education: University of Belgrade

Nebojša Bakarec (Serbian Cyrillic: Небојша Бакарец; born 21 April 1963) is a Serbian politician. He has been active for many years in the city politics of Belgrade and is currently serving his second term in the National Assembly of Serbia. At one time a prominent member of the Democratic Party of Serbia (Demokratska stranka Srbije, DSS), he is now a member of the Serbian Progressive Party (Srpska napredna stranka, SNS).

== Early life and private career ==
Bakarec was born in Osijek, in what was then the Socialist Republic of Croatia in the Socialist Federal Republic of Yugoslavia. He later moved to Belgrade. He is also known for having several tattoos and has written a number of songs.

Bakarec has written articles for Informer, a tabloid newspaper in Serbia.

== Political career ==
Bakarec became a member of the Democratic Party (Demokratska stranka, DS) when multi-party democracy was reintroduced to Serbia in 1990. When the DS split in 1992, he joined the breakaway Democratic Party of Serbia.

=== Democratic Party of Serbia ===
In 2000, the DSS participated in the Democratic Opposition of Serbia (DOS), a broad coalition of parties opposed to Slobodan Milošević's administration. Bakarec was a spokesperson for the DOS in the 2000 Yugoslavian general election and the subsequent 2000 Serbian parliamentary election. He became president of the executive board in the Belgrade municipality of Stari Grad following the 2000 Serbian local elections and held this position until 2004. The DSS left the DOS in 2002; in that year, Bakarec was a spokesperson for DSS leader Vojislav Koštunica in his bids to become president of Serbia in the September–October and December elections.

Bakarec received the sixty-seventh position on the DSS's electoral list in the 2003 Serbian parliamentary election. The party won fifty-three seats. He was not initially chosen as part of the DSS's parliamentary delegation, but he received a mandate on 12 February 2004 as the replacement for another member. (From 2000 to 2011, mandates were awarded to successful parties and coalitions rather than individual candidates, and it was common practice for the mandates to be distributed out of numerical order. Bakarec's position on the DSS list had no bearing on whether or when he received a mandate.) His first term in the assembly was in any event brief; he resigned on 16 March 2004.

He appeared in the lead position on the DSS's list for the Stari Grad municipal assembly in the 2004 Serbian local elections and received another mandate after the list won eleven seats. He subsequently became deputy president (i.e., deputy mayor) of the municipality and served in this role until 2008.

Bakarec was given a mandate for the Assembly of the City of Belgrade after receiving the twenty-third position on a combined DSS–New Serbia list in the 2008 Serbian local elections. The results of this election were initially inconclusive, and discussions took place between the DSS, the Serbian Radical Party, and the Socialist Party of Serbia about forming a coalition government. These talks were unsuccessful; a new city government was formed by the DS and the Socialist Party, and the DSS served in opposition. Bakarec also appeared again in the lead position on the DSS's list for the Stari Grad municipal assembly and received another term in that body.

In 2011, Bakarec stated on website of Vidovdan magazine that homosexuality was abnormal and should be treated by psychiatrists and psychologists. The following year, he was convicted by the First Basic Court in Belgrade of hate speech and of severe discrimination against LBGT people on the basis of this statement.

Serbia's electoral system was reformed in 2011, such that mandates were awarded in numerical order to candidates on successful electoral lists. Bakarec received the tenth position on the DSS list for the Belgrade City Assembly in the 2012 city election and was re-elected when the list won ten seats. He also received the fifty-eighth position on the DSS list in the concurrent 2012 Serbian parliamentary election. The party won twenty-one mandates, and he was not returned.

Bakarec was promoted to the fifth position on the DSS's list in the 2014 Belgrade City Assembly election and was re-elected again when the list won nine mandates. The election was won by the Serbian Progressive Party and its allies. The DSS experienced a serious split after the election. Bakarec was expelled from the party in 2015 and joined a breakaway group called the Independent Democratic Party of Serbia, serving as one of its inaugural vice-presidents. In 2017, he left this group to join the Progressive Party. He later said that he joined the Progressives at the request of Aleksandar Vučić and that Progressive Party vice-president Milenko Jovanov, himself a former DSS member, helped to facilitate the move.

=== Serbian Progressive Party ===
Bakarec received the thirty-fifth position on the Progressive Party's list in the 2018 Belgrade City Assembly election and was elected to a fourth term when the list won a majority victory with sixty-four seats. Two years later, he received the 132nd position on the Progressive Party's list in the 2020 Serbian parliamentary election and was elected to a second term in the national assembly when the list won a landslide majority with 188 mandates. He is now a member of the assembly committee on administrative, budgetary, mandate, and immunity issues; a member of the committee on human and minority rights and gender equality; a deputy member of the committee on Kosovo-Metohija and the culture and information committee; the leader of Serbia's parliamentary friendship group with Nauru; and a member of the parliamentary friendship groups with the Bahamas, Botswana, Cameroon, the Central African Republic, Comoros, the Dominican Republic, Ecuador, Equatorial Guinea, Eritrea, Grenada, Guinea-Bissau, Jamaica, Kyrgyzstan, Laos, Liberia, Madagascar, Mali, Mauritius, Mozambique, Nicaragua, Nigeria, Palau, Papua New Guinea, Paraguay, Poland, the Republic of Congo, Saint Vincent and the Grenadines, Sao Tome, the Solomon Islands, South Sudan, Sri Lanka, Sudan, Suriname, Togo, Trinidad and Tobago, Uruguay, and Uzbekistan.
