= Olja Petrović (politician) =

Serbian politician (born 1990)

Olja Petrović (Serbian Cyrillic: Оља Петровић; born 5 December 1990) is a Serbian народна посланица. She was elected to the National Assembly of Serbia in the 2020 Serbian parliamentary election as a member of the Serbian Progressive Party.

== Early life and career ==
Petrović was born in Pirot, Republic of Serbia, in what was then the Socialist Federal Republic of Yugoslavia. She holds a master of laws degree.

== Politician ==
=== Municipal politics ===
Petrović was appointed as a member of Pirot's city council (i.e., the executive branch of the city government) as a Progressive Party representative in 2018, serving in the role until 2020. She also was a participant in the party's Academy of Young Leaders program during this time. She was given the fourth position on the party's electoral list for the Pirot municipal assembly in the 2020 Serbian local elections and was elected when the list won a majority victory with thirty-six mandates.

=== Parliamentarian ===
Petrović was given the twelfth position on the Progressive Party's Aleksandar Vučić — For Our Children electoral list for the 2020 Serbian parliamentary election. This was tantamount to election, and she was indeed elected when the list won a landslide majority with 188 mandates. She is now a member of the assembly committee on constitutional and legislative issues and the agriculture, forestry, and water management committee; a deputy member of the environmental protection committee; a deputy member of the European Union–Serbia stabilization and association committee; the leader of Serbia's parliamentary friendship group with the Democratic Republic of the Congo; and a member of the parliamentary friendship groups with Australia, Brazil, Bulgaria, China, Greece, Mexico, North Macedonia, Montenegro, Portugal, Russia, Spain, the United Arab Emirates, and the United States of America.
