= Jadranka Jovanović =

Serbian operatic prima donna and politician

Doña; Jadranka Jovanović OKZ OLP
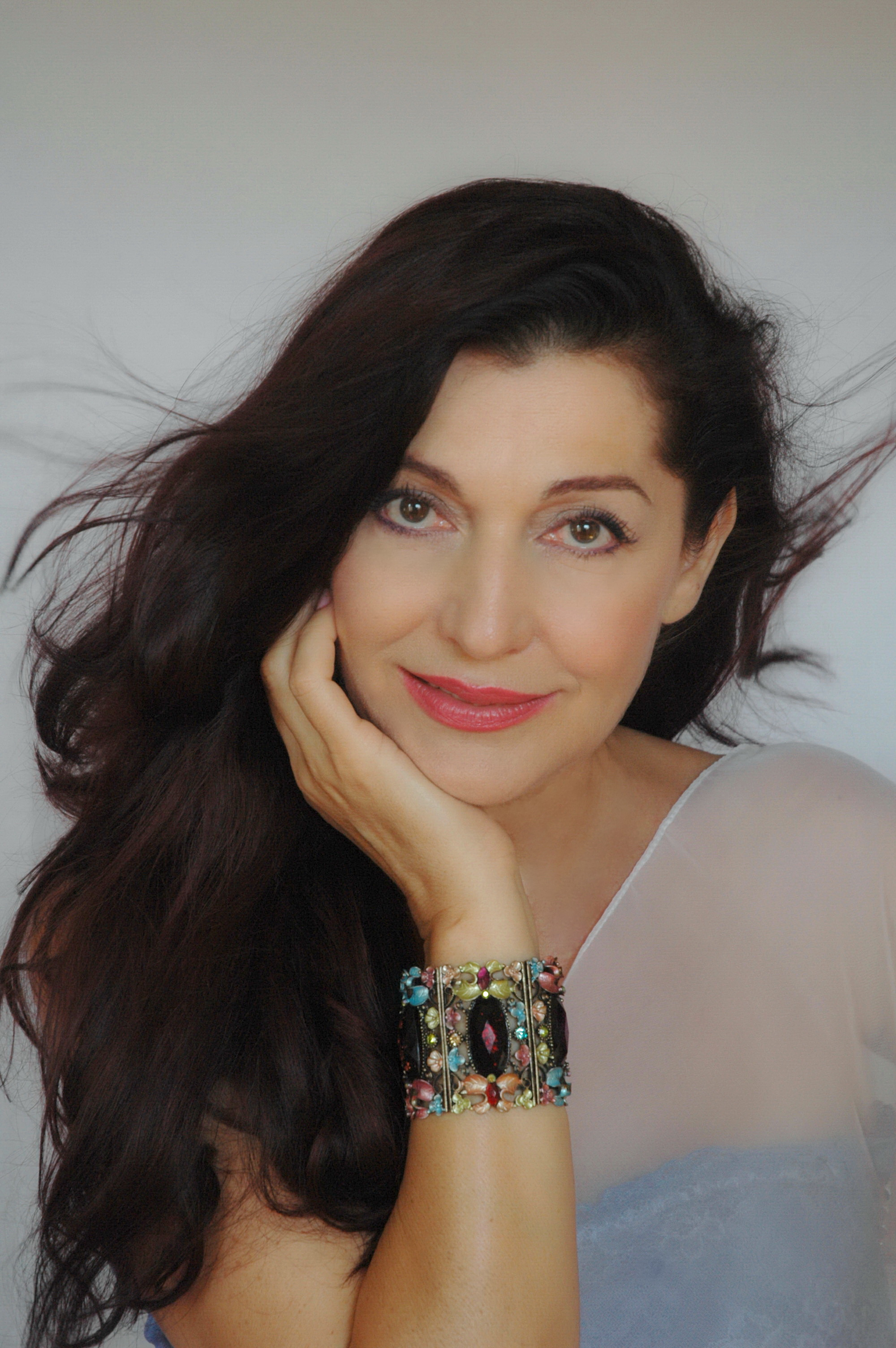

Member of the National Assembly of the Republic of Serbia
- In office 3 June 2016 – 17 November 2026
- Parliamentary group: Serbia Must Not Stop

Personal details
- Born: 8 January 1958 (age 68) Belgrade, Yugoslavia
- Party: Non partisan
- Education: University of Belgrade
- Alma mater: Faculty of Music Arts
- Awards: Order of Karađorđe's Star; Order of La Pléiade
- Musical career
- Genres: Opera; Pop music
- Occupations: Opera artist - Master of Arts; Actress; Politician
- Instruments: Vocals; Piano
- Works: PGP-RTS
- Years active: 1981–present
- Website: jadrankajovanovic.com

Jadranka Jovanović OKZ OLP (Serbian Cyrillic: Јадранка Јовановић; Serbian pronunciation: [jǎdraŋka jɔʋǎːnɔʋitɕ]; born 8 January 1958) is a Serbian operatic prima donna, mezzo-soprano who has an active career natively and internationally. Associated with the National Theatre in Belgrade, she has also been a member of the National Assembly of Serbia since 2016.

== Life and musical career ==
Jovanović was born in Belgrade. In her native town she graduated B.A. in theory of music and solo singing and M.A. in solo singing. She debuted as Rosina in Rossini's Il barbiere di Siviglia at the National Theater in Belgrade, where she interpreted all main mezzo-soprano roles.

Her international career started at Teatro alla Scala in Milan where she appeared in Carmen (Mercedes) and Andrea Chénier (Bersi), conducted by Claudio Abbado and Riccardo Chailly. At La Scala she also appeared in the leading role in the world premiere staging of Orfeo by Luigi Rossi.

She mostly performed in Italian theatres, opera houses and festivals:

- Roma (Teatro Argentino) and Milano (Teatro Carcano), she appeared with José Carreras in fantasy based on Carmen;
- Firenze (Teatro Comunale) The Gambler (Blanche) by Sergei Prokofiev, with Daniela Dessi, Dimiter Petkov and maestro Edoardo Mata.
- Parma (Teatro Reggio), Falstaff (Mrs. Slender) by A.Salieri;
- The Donizetti Festival in Bergamo – Il Diluvio Universale (Ada), and Fausta (Irella);
- Palermo (Teatro Massimo) Rigoletto (Maddalena);
- Cagliari (Teatro Romano) La Forza del Destino (Preziosilla);
- Catania (Teatro Bellini) Il Capello di Paglia Firenza (La baronessa de Champigny) conducted by M.Arena and the Countess of Czardas (Silva);
- Pesaro – The Rossini Festival: Mose in Egitto, conducted by D.Renzetti;
- Trieste (Teatro Verdi) The Countess Maritza by E.Kalman, The Little White horse by R.Benatchy, Hary Janos by Z.Kodally, Miss Juliette by A.Bibalo with Jose Cura.

She sang in various operas in other countries:

- Barcelona (Teatro Liceo) Adriana Lecouvreur (Principessa de Bouillon) with Mirella Freni and Plácido Domingo, and Roberto Devereux (Sara) conducted by Richard Bonynge;
- Lissabon (Teatro Nacional de Sao Carlos) she sang Elena in Mephistopheles by A.Boito conducted by Daniel Nazareth, and Mass in c-minor by Mozart in Gulbenkian Foundation with maestro Claudio Schimone;
- Rio de Janeiro (Teatro Municipal):
- Carmen (Carmen) with Plácido Domingo and Justino Dias; Requiem – G.Verdi, conducted by Anton Guadagno, Il Barbiere di Siviglia (Rosina) and Ariadne auf Naxos (Compositor) conducted by Eugene Kohn.
- São Paulo (Teatro Municipal) Carmen (Carmen) conducted by Isaac Karabtchevsky,
- Tokyo (Bunka Kaikan)- Carmen (Carmen);
- Athens Festival (Irodion)- Carmen (Carmen)
- In National theatre in Dublin, she sang Eboli in Don Carlo, and in Mexico City (Teatro de la Ciudad) Il Barbiere di Siviglia (Rosina).
- At the Palm Beach Opera (USA) she interpreted main roles in LA: Cenerentola and L`Italiana in Algeri, also Eboli in Don Carlo with maestro Anton Guadagno.
- Amneris in opera Aida she sang in Austria in the festival Gars am Kamp, Opera Zagreb, and samer festival `Split-Peristil` in Croatia.
- At Georges Enescu Festival in Bucharest (Romania) she was Abigaille (Nabucco), as well as in Festival in Split, end Festival in Skopje (Macedonia).
- In Bulgaria National opera Sofia she sang Adalgisa (Norma),
- Toronto – Glenn Gould Hall, Recital.

Jovanović sung leading role in the first performance of Carmen in the Middle -East, in Abu Dhabi. She also sang at The Royal Opera de Vallonie(Liege), L'Opera de Nice, L`Opera de Toulon, L`Opera de Bordeaux, Teatro Cervantes (Malaga), Teatro della Maestranza (Siviglia), Teatro Victoria Eugenia (San Sebastian), Teatro Vittorio Emanuele (Messina), Bedzih Smetana Hall (Prag), Opera Budapest, Opera Odessa (Ukraina), Salzburg (Mozarteum), Dubrovnik Samer Festival, Opera Ljubljana i Opera Maribor (Slovenia), Thessaloniki, Brno, Beijing...

At Figeras (Spain) she participated first world performance fragment of the opera Être Dieu with libretto of Salvador Dalí. She has performed two recitals at Kennedy Center (Washington, D.C) as well as a performance at Carnegie Hall (New York).

== Political career ==
Her political career started as nominee on Serbian Progressive Party's Aleksandar Vučić – Serbia Is Winning electoral list in the 2016 Serbian parliamentary election. She is not herself a member of the party but ran as an aligned non-partisan candidate. The list won a landslide victory with 131 out of 250 parliamentary mandates, and Jovanović was sworn in as a legislator on 3 June 2016. During the 2016–20 assembly, she was a member of the parliamentary committee on the diaspora and Serbs in the region; a member of the culture and information committee; the leader of Serbia's delegation to the Parliamentary Assembly of the Francophonie (where Serbia has associate member status); and a member of the parliamentary friendship groups with Algeria, Azerbaijan, Australia, China, France, Germany, Indonesia, Italy, Japan, South Korea, Uganda, and the United States of America.

She received the twenty-third position on the Progressive Party's list in the 2020 election and was elected to a second term when the list won another landslide majority with 188 mandates. She continues to serve on the diaspora and culture committees and lead Serbia's delegation to the Francophonie.

== Awards ==
In 2021, she was awarded the Order of Karađorđe's Star.
