= Nikola Radosavljević (politician) =

Serbian politician (born 1975)

- Born: 1975 (age 50–51); Jagodina
- Occupation: politician
- Title: Member of the National Assembly of the Republic of Serbia since 2020
- Political party: Serbian Progressive Party

Nikola Radosavljević (Serbian Cyrillic: Никола Радосављевић; born 1975) is a politician in Serbia. He has served in the National Assembly of Serbia since 2020 as a member of the Serbian Progressive Party.

== Private career ==
Radsavljević was born in Jagodina, in what was then the Socialist Republic of Serbia in the Socialist Federal Republic of Yugoslavia. He holds a master's degree in economics.

== Politician ==
=== Municipal politics ===
Radosavljević became a commissioner of the Progressive Party's local board in Jagodina in the mid-2010s. In 2015, against the backdrop of a serious split in the local party, he announced that the executive board had expelled the party's four members of the city assembly. The expelled members did not recognize this decision (or Radsavljević's leadership) and continued to serve as a "Progressive Party" group in the assembly until the next election.

Radosavljević received the lead position on the Progressive Party's electoral list for Jagodina in the 2016 Serbian local elections. Municipal politics in Jagodina have long been dominated by United Serbia leader Dragan Marković Palma, whose party won a majority victory in an alliance with the Socialist Party of Serbia. The only other list to cross the electoral threshold was that of the Progressives; Radosaveljević was accordingly elected and led his party's group in the assembly.

In February 2020, it was reported that Radosavljević was the victim of political intimidation when an unknown party threw the severed head of a cat onto his family property.

For the 2020 local elections, the Progressives joined a combined electoral list with United Serbia and the Socialist Party. Radosavljević was given the third position on the list and was re-elected when it won a landslide majority with seventeen out of twenty-one seats.

=== Parliamentarian ===
Radosavljević received the 163rd position on the Progressive Party's Aleksandar Vučić – Serbia Is Winning electoral list in the 2016 Serbian parliamentary election. The list won 131 out of 250 mandates, and he was not elected. He was subsequently given the 171st position on the successor Aleksandar Vučić — For Our Children list in the 2020 election and was elected when the list won a landslide majority with 188 mandates. Radosavljević is now a member of the assembly's health and family committee, a deputy member of the committee on the diaspora and Serbs in the region and the committee on the economy, regional development, trade, tourism, and energy, a deputy member of Serbia's delegation to the Parliamentary Dimension of the Central European Initiative, and a member of the parliamentary friendship groups with Armenia, Austria, Bosnia and Herzegovina, Bulgaria, China, Egypt, Greece, Italy, Montenegro, and the Philippines, Romania, Russia, Slovakia, and Turkey.
