= Institute for Political Studies in Belgrade =

Scientific Institute for political science

Institute for Political Studies
- Serbian: Институт за политичке студије, Institut za političke studije
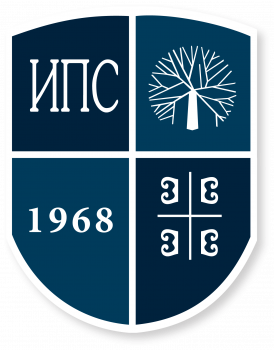
- Official logo
- Founded: 1968; 58 years ago
- Founder: Republic of Serbia
- Location: Belgrade, Serbia
- Origins: Faculty of Political Science - Belgrade

The Institute for Political Studies in Belgrade is an academic institution in Belgrade, Serbia. It is for research of political science.

== History ==
The institute was founded in 1968 by the Government of SFR Yugoslavia. It in fact developed out of the research unit of the High School of Political Science. It developed into an independent scientific institution. After separating from the Faculty of Political Science in Belgrade, the Institute for Political Studies was given the status of independent scientific institution under the Government of Republic of Serbia.

== Scope of Activity ==
Activities of the institute are conducted by a competent and diverse team of researchers, encompassing scientific fields and disciplines such as political science, international relations, law, economy, history, philosophy, psychology and social work. Research results are disseminated externally or through one of seven scientific journals published by the Institute.

== Journals ==
The current periodical editions of the Institute are:

- Serbian Political Thought
- Political Review
- National Interest
- The Policy of National Security
- Social Policy
- Administration and Public Policy

== Structure ==
- Governing Board (responsible to the Government of Serbia)
- Scientific Board(representing Scientific Community of researchers in the Institute)
- Director (as a CEO of an Institute)
