= Edin Đerlek =

Serbian lawyer and politician (born 1987)

- Един Ђерлек
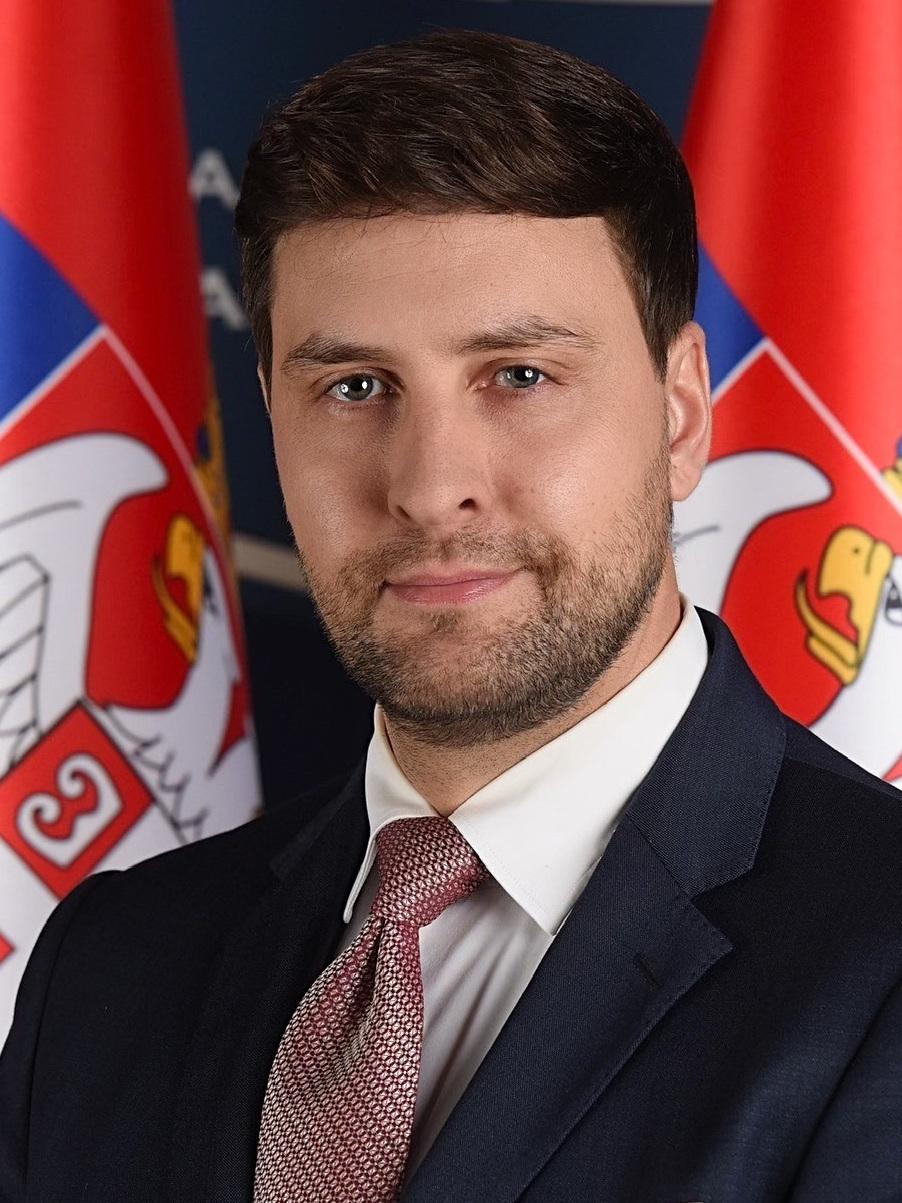
- Official portrait, 2022

Vice President of the National Assembly of the Republic of Serbia
- Incumbent
- Assumed office 20 March 2024

Minister without portfolio
- In office 26 October 2022 – 2 May 2024
- Prime Minister: Ana Brnabić

Personal details
- Born: 23 January 1987 (age 39) Belgrade, SR Serbia, SFR Yugoslavia
- Party: SPP
- Occupation: Politician
- Profession: Lawyer

Edin Đerlek (Serbian Cyrillic: Един Ђерлек; born 23 January 1987) is a Serbian lawyer and politician who served as minister without portfolio from 2022 to 2024. An ethnic Bosniak, he is a vice-president of the Justice and Reconciliation Party (SPP). As minister without portfolio, he was in charge of balancing regional development.

== Early life ==
Edin Đerlek was born on 23 January 1987 in Belgrade, Socialist Republic of Serbia, Socialist Federal Republic of Yugoslavia. He graduated from the university "Abu Nour" in Damascus, Syria in 2009, after which he enrolled into the Faculty of Islamic Studies in Novi Pazar, where he graduated sharia. He also completes studies in law, obtaining the title of Bachelor of Law at the Faculty of Law of the International University in Novi Pazar, where he defended his thesis on "Diplomacy" with a grade of ten.

== Career ==
Đerlek is a member of the Justice and Reconciliation Party (SPP). Đerlek was the candidate of SPP for the National Assembly in 2016 and 2020 Between 2016 and 2022, he served as a member of the City Assembly of Novi Pazar. As of 2022, he serves as the vice-president of SPP.

He held several important functions and duties, such as:

- Chief of Staff to Mufti Academician Muamer-ef. Zukorlić and Secretary in the Islamic Community in Serbia;
- Spokesperson for the Bosniak Democratic Community of Sandzak - BDZS (current name Party of Justice and Reconciliation - SPP);
- General Secretary of the Party of Justice and Reconciliation;
- Vice President of the Party of Justice and Reconciliation;
- Director of the Political Academy of SPP;
- Councilor in the City Assembly of Novi Pazar for two terms;
- Councilor in the Bosniak National Council (BNV) for two terms;
- Member of the Gender Equality Committee at the City Assembly of Novi Pazar;
- Assistant at the Faculty of Islamic Studies;
- Assistant at the International University;
- Professor at the Economic-Trade School. In November 2022, Edin Đerlek was appointed as a minister in the Government of the Republic of Serbia. From 2023, in addition to his ministerial position, he was appointed as a member of the Board of Directors of the Development Fund of the Republic of Serbia, as well as many professional commissions and bodies such as the Public Services Committee, the Administrative Commission, and the Commission for Determining Damage from Natural Disasters. He is the president of the Serbian part of the Joint Commission for Economic and Technical Cooperation with the State of Kuwait.

In May 2023, he was elected as the Deputy President of the Party of Justice and Reconciliation. He is successfully and dedicatedly engaged in political activities, but also in humanitarian work, which was particularly highlighted during the coronavirus pandemic when he and his team helped hundreds of families across the country.

He is the recipient of the LAW Life award from the law and economy portal for demonstrated humanity and altruism during the COVID-19 pandemic. He has participated in numerous scientific gatherings, international conferences, and summits around the world.

In March 2024 he was elected as the vice-president of National Assembly of the Republic of Serbia.

=== Minister without portfolio ===
It was announced on 24 October 2022 that Đerlek would serve as minister without portfolio in the third cabinet of Ana Brnabić. Following the announcement, Đerlek stated that "he would work in interests of Bosniaks, Sandžak, and the state". He was sworn in on 26 October. He is in charge of balancing regional development.

== Personal life ==
By profession, he is a lawyer. He speaks Arabic, English, and Russian.
