= Aleksandar Marković (politician) =

Serbian politician (born 1981)

- Александар Марковић
- Born: 22 May 1981 (age 45); Belgrade, Yugoslavia
- Occupation: Politician

Aleksandar Marković (Александар Марковић; born 22 May 1981) is Serbian politician who has served in the National Assembly of Serbia as a member of the Serbian Progressive Party since 2014. (Note: Somewhat confusing, both politicians named Aleksandar Marković were born in 1981, began political life in the Serbian Radical Party before shifting to the Progressives, and have served in both the City of Belgrade Assembly and the Vračar municipal assembly.)

== Early life and career ==
Marković was born in Belgrade, in what was Socialist Republic of Serbia in the Socialist Federal Republic of Yugoslavia. He is a graduate economist.

== Politician ==
=== Municipal politics ===
Marković entered political life as a member of the far-right Serbian Radical Party. He appeared in the third position on the party's electoral list for the Vračar municipal assembly in the 2004 Serbian local elections and was awarded a mandate after the list finished in third place with nine seats. The election was won by the Democratic Party and its allies, and Marković served in opposition. He given the fourth position on the party's list for Vračar in the 2008 local elections and was selected for a second term after the list won eleven seats.

Marković also received the 48th position on the Radical Party's list for the City Assembly of Belgrade in 2008 and was awarded a mandate after the party won 40 seats. The Radical Party experienced a significant split later in 2008, with several members joining the more moderate Serbian Progressive Party under the leadership of Tomislav Nikolić and Aleksandar Vučić. Marković sided with the Progressives. On 11 February 2009, he stood down from the Belgrade city assembly.

Following a 2011 reformation, mandates in Serbian elections were awarded to successful candidates in numerical order. Marković was given the fourth position on the Progressive Party's Let's Get Vračar Moving list in the 2012 local elections and was returned for a third term when the list won seven mandates, placing second against the Democrats.

=== Parliamentarian ===
Marković received the 125th position on the Progressive Party's Aleksandar Vučić — Future We Believe In list in the 2014 parliamentary election and was elected when the list won a landslide victory with 158 mandates. In the parliament that followed, he served on the assembly committee on administrative, budgetary, mandate, and immunity issues. He was promoted to the nineteenth position on the successor Aleksandar Vučić – Serbia Is Winning list in the 2016 election and was re-elected when the list won 131 mandates.

Between 2016 and 2020, Marković was a member of the defence and internal affairs committee, the committee on the diaspora and Serbs in the region, the committee on Kosovo-Metohija, and the committee on administrative, budgetary, mandate, and immunity issues; a deputy member of the security services control committee and the committee on constitutional and legislative issues; the head of Serbia's parliamentary friendship groups with Lesotho and Moldova; and a member of the parliamentary friendship groups with Azerbaijan, Belarus, Bosnia and Herzegovina, Chile, Croatia, Cuba, Djibouti, El Salvador, Ghana, Guatemala, Guyana, Indonesia, Iraq, Malawi, Micronesia, Montenegro, Myanmar, Nepal, North Korea, the State of Palestine, the Philippines, Russia, Syria, Tunisia, Uganda, the United Arab Emirates, Vietnam, Zambia, and Zimbabwe. He was also appointed as a substitute member of Serbia's delegation to the Parliamentary Assembly of the Council of Europe, where he caucused with the European People's Party. During this period, Marković was an alternate member of the committee on culture, science, education, and media.

Marković received the 32nd position on the Progressive Party's list in the 2020 Serbian parliamentary election and was elected to a third term when the list won a landslide majority with 188 mandates. He is now the chair of the defence committee, a member of the security committee and the diaspora committee, the head of Serbia's parliamentary friendship group with North Macedonia, and a member of the friendship groups with Armenia, Bosnia and Herzegovina, Bulgaria, Hungary, Moldova, Montenegro, Romania, and the United Arab Emirates.
