= Milica Nikolić (politician) =

Serbian politician (born 1993)

Milica Nikolić (Serbian Cyrillic: Милица Николић; born 1993) is a politician in Serbia. She has served in the National Assembly of Serbia since 2020 as a member of the Serbian Progressive Party.

== Early life ==
Nikolić was born in Požega, Serbia, in what was then the Federal Republic of Yugoslavia. She has a Bachelor of Laws degree. Nikolić has participated in the Progressive Party's Academy of Young Leaders program.

== Politician ==
=== Municipal politics ===
In 2019, the Progressive Party's municipal board in Požega was dissolved. Nikolić was appointed to a five-member commission that oversaw the board until new party elections could be held. She received the third position on the party's electoral list for the Požega municipal assembly in the 2020 Serbian local elections and was elected when the list won a majority victory with thirty-two out of fifty-two mandates.

=== Parliamentarian ===
Nikolić received the 164th position on the Progressive Party's Aleksandar Vučić — For Our Children list in the 2020 Serbian parliamentary election and was elected when the list won a landslide majority with 188 out of 250 mandates. She is now a member of the assembly's health and family committee, a deputy member of the defence and internal affairs committee and the committee on the judiciary, public administration, and local self-government, the head of Serbia's parliamentary friendship group with Chile, and a member of the parliamentary friendship groups with China, France, Japan, Montenegro, and Russia.
