= 2023 Serbian parliamentary election campaign =

The election campaign for the 2023 Serbian parliamentary election lasted from 1 November to 17 December. The campaign saw the formation of the ProGlas initiative, as well as an increase of usage of the social media platform TikTok among politicians. Numerous debates also took place, mostly organised by the Radio Television of Serbia. Main issues discussed during the campaign were related to economy, North Kosovo crisis, and living standards. Aleksandar Vučić, the president of Serbia, despite not being a candidate in the elections, dominated the campaign. The Serbian Progressive Party (SNS) began its campaign shortly before the elections were announced; they were joined by former opposition politicians, while also heavily accusing the opposition of trying to incite a civil war. They campaigned on populist themes. The Socialist Party of Serbia coalition portrayed itself as socialist and patriotic, while also supporting the accession of Serbia to the European Union.

Regarding the opposition, Serbia Against Violence campaigned on environmental issues, economy, introducing progressive taxation, and education. The National Democratic Alternative campaigned on re-introducing the first-past-the-post system, while opposing corruption and party employment, and rejecting the Ohrid Agreement. The National Gathering coalition was endorsed by the Alternative for Germany and Obraz organisation; they supported establishing closer relations with BRICS, while opposing cooperation with the European Union and rejecting the Ohrid Agreement.

The Office for Democratic Institutions and Human Rights reported, after the elections, that the SNS had "systematic advantage" over the opposition during the campaign, as well as reporting that the campaign was marked with negative campaigning and fearmongering. During the campaign, it was reported that independent media and opposition politicians received threats.

== Background ==
Parliamentary elections in Serbia are held every four years. Since the Serbian Progressive Party (SNS) came to power in 2012, four parliamentary elections were held. The 2014, 2016, and 2022 parliamentary elections were held earlier than they were supposed to (i.e. snap election), while the 2020 parliamentary election is the only election which was called after the expiration of National Assembly's four-year term.

In April 2023, newspaper Danas reported that the parliamentary elections, local elections, the Vojvodina provincial elections, and the Belgrade City Assembly elections could be held as early as in November 2023. Newspaper Nova and news portal N1 reported in September 2023 that the government considered 19 December as the date for local, provincial, and parliamentary elections. Aleksandar Vučić, the president of Serbia, and Miloš Vučević, the president of the governing SNS, also held a gathering with officials from Vojvodina on 5 September, to discuss the Vojvodina provincial election. The decision to hold snap elections was confirmed in late September at a government session. For the election to take place on 17 December, the government of Serbia had to formally propose to dissolve the National Assembly between 18 October and 2 November. The president of Serbia then had 72 hours to decide whether to dissolve the National Assembly or not. The government of Serbia sent Vučić the proposal to dissolve the National Assembly and organise local elections in 65 cities and municipalities on 30 October. On 1 November, Vučić dissolved the National Assembly of Serbia and called the elections for 17 December. The official campaign period lasted 46 days.

=== Predicted issues ===
Analysts, such as Dejan Bursać, a teaching associate at the Institute for Political Studies, journalists Bojan Bilbija (of Politika), Zoran Panović (of Demostat), and Miloš Garić (Kosovo Online editor-in-chief), Vladimir Pejić, the director of Agency Faktor Plus, Cvijetin Milivojević and political consultant Nikola Tomić, Bojan Klačar, and Stojanović, all cited the ongoing tensions with Kosovo as one of the main issues in the 2023 election.

Bilbija, Panović, Garić, Pejić, and Mihailović also cited the economy as one of the main issues. Bursać and Klačar also added rising prices as one of the main issues of the campaign, while Klačar and Stojanović agreed that living standards and inflation would also be one of the key issues.

Mihailović and Pejić also listed corruption and crime as one of the campaign issues. Klačar additionally named foreign policy positions and EU membership as main issues.

== Conduct ==
Halfway through the campaign, Croatian daily newspaper Večernji list described the 2023 election as "the most uncertain election since 2012". Political scientist and journalist Aleksandar Ivković warned that the campaign would be unprincipled, citing defacing graffiti, inflammatory posters, provocative music videos, and tabloid media content targeted against opposition groups and leaders before to its launch. Political scientist Boban Stojanović said that the political friction did not decrease and that "political violence will be seen until the end of the election campaign" (političko nasilje biće prisutno do kraja kampanje). Stojanović also said that the election was more uncertain than the 2022 election.

During the campaign, Vučić strongly criticised the opposition, alleging that a vote for them is "a vote for the president of the Party of Freedom and Justice, Dragan Đilas, a vote for the independence of Kosovo, and for the introduction of sanctions to Russia", (Note: svaki glas za opoziciju glas za predsednika Stranke slobode i pravde Dragana Đilasa, glas za nezavisnost Kosova i za uvođenje sankcija [Rusiji]) and that Đilas controlled the entire opposition. He portrayed the election as "between the past [...] and the future" (između "prošlosti" [...] i "budućnosti), while alleging with Vučević that there was a plan to overthrow SNS from power. Ana Brnabić and Minister Aleksandar Martinović claimed that the opposition wanted to create disorder and incite a civil war, respectively. These statements were criticised by the non-government organisation CRTA.

During their visit in Serbia, Parliamentary Assembly of the Council of Europe (PACE) representatives concluded that the campaign was characterised by polarisation and intimidation from the government. The representatives cited negative campaigning, incendiary rhetoric and hate speech towards opposition politicians, and attacks on independent media as examples. Raša Nedeljkov from the non-governmental organisation CRTA expected a rigorous and unfair campaign with bigotry as its cornerstone; he listed negative campaigning against political opponents, independent media representatives, civil society organisations, and election observers as examples. CRTA also claimed that voter intimidation increased during the campaign period. During the first three weeks of the election campaign, CRTA reported "inequality, suspicions, and threats" (neravnopravnost, sumnje i pretnje) in its analysis, claiming that government parties had significant advantage due to the abuse of public institutions. During the campaign, the Centre for Investigative Journalism of Serbia (CINS) revealed that a youth group ran a call centre to intimidate voters. CINS also reported that the call centre also possessed a database of voters, with voters sorted in groups based on whether they are a member of SNS, a SNS voter, or a non-SNS voter.

An informal organisation of high school students launched a campaign in October 2023 named "It's Up To You Too" (I ti se pitaš), aimed at first-time voters in the 2023 parliamentary election. The Civic Initiatives, a NGO, also launched a campaign with activists, professors, and public figures to boost the turnout and the number of controllers (members of polling stations) in the 2023 election. A group of public figures, including actors Svetlana Bojković, Dragan Bjelogrlić, former Serbian Academy of Sciences and Arts president Vladimir S. Kostić, legal scholar and judge Miodrag Majić, and former University of Belgrade rector Ivanka Popović, presented the initiative ProGlas on 7 November 2023 to boost the electoral turnout for the 2023 election and promote anti-crime and anti-corruption ideas. The ProGlas initiative received than more 100,000 signatures of support by 15 November. Regarding ProGlas, political scientist Duško Radosavljević said that "if we will remember this campaign for something, it will be because of the attempt by professional and respected people to ask for a new understanding of politics. For me, that is a force that provides a real chance for Serbia to be better". (Note: Ako ćemo po nečemu pamtiti ovu kampanju, to će biti taj pokušaj stručnih i uglednih ljudi da zatraže novo poimanje politike. To je za mene neka sila koja pruža realnu šansu da Srbija bude bolja)

The 2023 parliamentary election campaign also saw the increase of usage of the social media platform TikTok among politicians. Vučić, Boris Tadić, the former president of Serbia, Marinika Tepić, Socialist Party of Serbia (SPS) president Ivica Dačić, and finance minister Siniša Mali all joined the platform in November 2023, to present themselves to younger voters. Jelena Kleut, a professor at the Faculty of Philosophy of the University of Belgrade, said that "knowing the Serbian Progressive Party, this move is based on data suggesting that the TikTok electorate might be interested in going to the polls in the election". (Note: Znajući Srpsku naprednu stranku, taj potez je zasnovan na nekim podacima koji govore da bi biračko telo koje se nalazi na TikTok-u moglo da bude zainteresovano da na ovim izborima izađe na glasanje)

== Slogans ==
Party/coalition	Campaign slogan	English translation	Refs
Alliance of Vojvodina Hungarians	Elnökünkért, közösségünkért, a jövőért!; Za našeg predsednika, za našu zajednicu, za budućnost!	For our President, for our community, for the future!	
National Democratic Alternative	Promene sad!	Changes now!	
People's Party	Siguran izbor. Ozbiljni ljudi	Safe choice. Serious people	
Serbia Against Violence	Promena je počela!	Change has begun!	
Serbian Radical Party	Otadžbina Srbija. Majka Rusija	Fatherland Serbia. Mother Russia	
SDS–DJB–OBAP	Dobro jutro Srbijo!	Good morning Serbia!	
SNS coalition	Srbija ne sme da stane Snaga je u ljudima	Serbia must not stop The power is in the people	
SPS–JS–Zeleni	Ivica Dačić – Premijer Srbije	Ivica Dačić – Prime Minister of Serbia	

== Debates ==
2023 Serbian parliamentary election debates
Date	Time	Organizers	P Present A Absent invitee I Invitee N Non-invitee										
Date	Time	Organizers	SNS	SPS	SPN	NO	NADA	Narodna	DJS	SRS	VMSZ/SVM	SPP–DSHV	Refs
14 Sep	10:05 am	RTS	P Milenko Jovanov	N	P Zoran Lutovac	N	N	N	N	N	N	N	
5 Oct	10:05 am	RTS	P Vladimir Orlić	N	N	N	N	P Vuk Jeremić	N	N	N	N	
10 Oct	9:00 pm	RTS	P Vladimir Orlić	P Snežana Paunović	P Marinika Tepić	P Boško Obradović	N	N	N	N	N	N	
24 Oct	9:00 pm	RTS	P Vladimir Orlić	P Đorđe Milićević	P Zoran Lutovac	N	N	P Vuk Jeremić	N	N	N	N	
26 Oct	10:05 am	RTS	N	P Snežana Paunović	N	P Milica Đurđević Stamenkovski	N	N	N	N	N	N	
31 Oct	9:00 pm	RTS	P Siniša Mali	P Dejan Radenković	P Biljana Đorđević	N	P Predrag Marsenić	N	N	N	N	N	
2 Nov	9:00 pm	Insajder	N	N	P Miroslav Aleksić	P Boško Obradović	N	N	N	N	N	N	
9 Nov	9:00 pm	Insajder	P Vladimir Orlić	P Branko Ružić	P Radomir Lazović	N	P Miloš Jovanović	N	N	N	N	N	
10 Nov	8:05 pm	RTV	P Marina Raguš	P Snežana Paunović	N	P Ivan Kostić	N	N	N	P Aleksandar Šešelj	N	N	
14 Nov	9:00 pm	RTS	P Vladimir Đukanović	P Slavica Đukić Dejanović	P Radomir Lazović	N	P Miloš Jovanović	N	N	N	N	N	
16 Nov	10:05 am	RTS	N	N	N	N	N	N	N	N	P Elvira Kovács	P Usame Zukorlić	
16 Nov	9:00 pm	Insajder	N	P Snežana Paunović	P Borko Stefanović	N	N	P Stefan Jovanović	P Goran Bogdanović	N	N	N	
17 Nov	8:05 pm	RTV	P Milenko Jovanov	N	P Janko Veselinović	N	P Predrag Marsenić	N	N	N	P Elvira Kovács	N	
20 Nov	9:17 am	Happy	N	N	P Aleksandar Jovanović Ćuta	N	N	N	N	P Vojislav Šešelj	N	N	
21 Nov	9:00 pm	RTS	P Ana Brnabić	N	P Aleksandar Jovanović Ćuta	P Boško Obradović	N	P Dušan Tufegdžić	N	N	N	N	
23 Nov	10:05 am	RTS	N	P Đorđe Milićević	N	N	N	P Vuk Jeremić	N	N	N	N	
23 Nov	9:00 pm	Insajder	N	P Slavica Đukić Dejanović	P Slobodan Cvejić	P Goran Igić	N	P Vuk Jeremić	N	N	N	N	
29 Nov	9:00 pm	N1	A	A	P Miroslav Aleksić	P Boško Obradović	P Miloš Jovanović	P Vuk Jeremić	N	N	N	N	
30 Nov	10:08 am	RTS	P Marina Raguš	N	N	N	N	N	P Boris Tadić	N	N	N	
30 Nov	9:00 pm	Insajder	N	P Vladimir Đukić	P Dragan Delić	P Goran Igić	N	P Aleksandar Radojević	P Dejan Žujović	N	N	N	
5 Dec	9:00 pm	RTS	P Vladimir Orlić	P Đorđe Milićević	P Zdravko Ponoš	N	P Miloš Jovanović	N	N	N	N	N	
7 Dec	9:00 pm	RTS	P Igor Simić	P Snežana Paunović	P Miroslav Aleksić	P Milica Đurđević Stamenkovski	N	N	N	N	N	N	
7 Dec	10:07 am	RTS	N	P Ivica Dačić	N	N	P Miloš Jovanović	N	N	N	N	N	
7 Dec	9:00 pm	Insajder	N	P Dejan Radenković	P Dušan Nikezić	P Tamara Milenković Kerković	P Predrag Marsenić	N	N	N	N	N	
12 Dec	9:00 pm	RTS	P Siniša Mali	P Dušan Bajatović	P Dušan Nikezić	N	N	N	P Saša Radulović	N	N	N	
13 Dec	9:00 pm	RTS	P Igor Simić	N	P Marinika Tepić	N	P Miloš Jovanović	P Vuk Jeremić	N	N	N	N	
14 Dec	10:05 am	RTS	P Igor Simić	N	P Miroslav Aleksić	N	N	N	N	N	N	N	

== Party campaigns ==
According to the preliminary report of the Agency for the Prevention of Corruption on 14 December, Serbia on the West alliance spent more than €200,000, People's Party (Narodna) spent €46,000, and SRS spent €1,500. From minority parties, the Russian Party spent €162,000. The final report showed that the SNS spent €7,400,000, the SPS spent €2,200,000, and the VMSZ spent €387,000. Regarding the opposition, the SPN spent €2,000,000 and NADA spent €616,000. The MI–GIN spent €60,000. The SNS spent most of its money on television advertising; it spent over €1,500,000 for advertising on both the Radio Television of Serbia and Pink.

=== Serbian Progressive Party ===
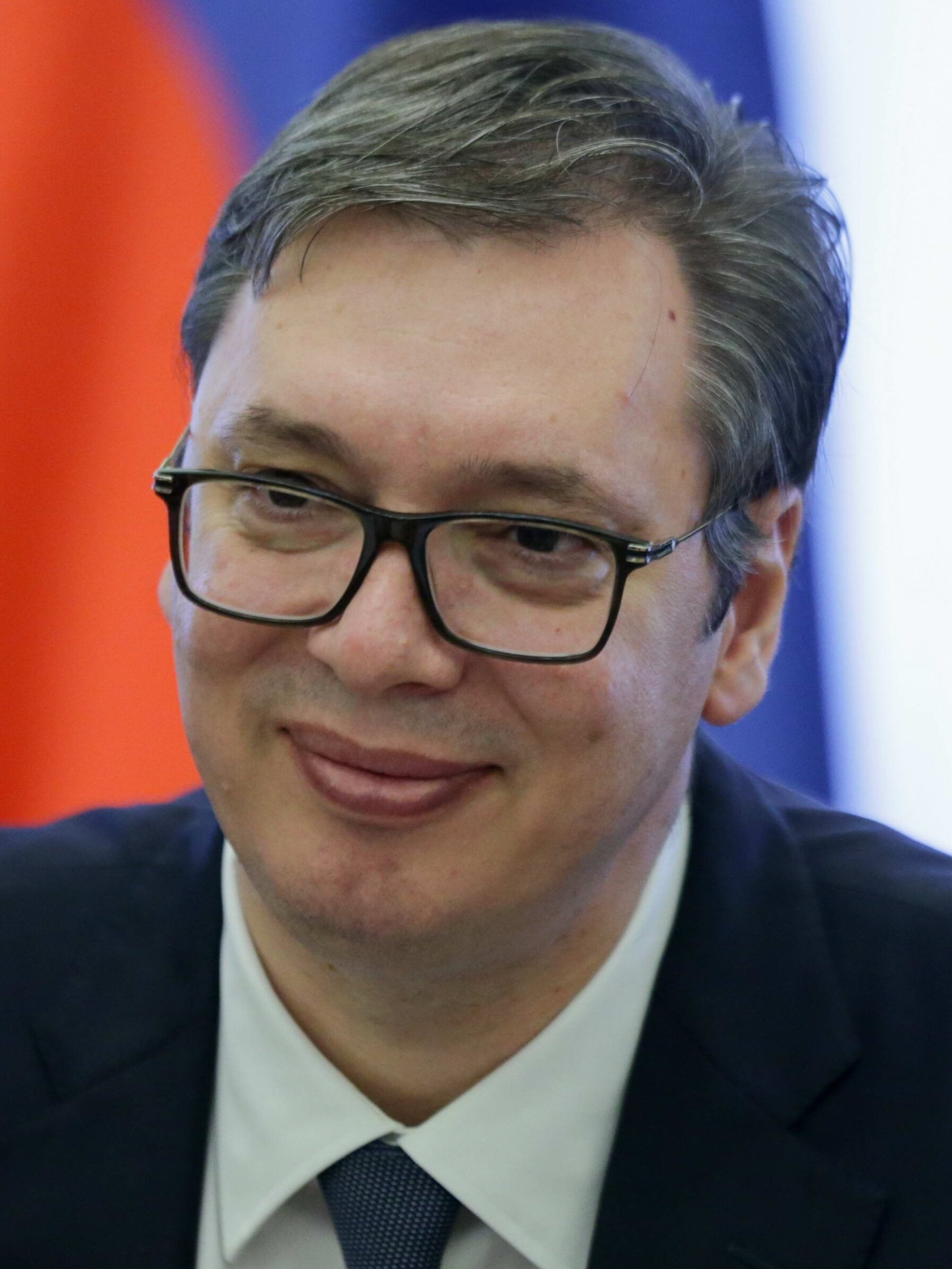
Despite no longer being president of SNS, Vučić mainly represented the party throughout the election campaign.

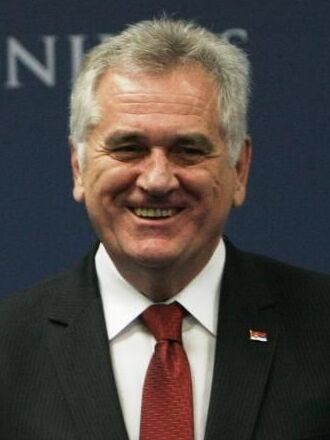
Tomislav Nikolić, former president of Serbia, was featured as a speaker at several rallies, despite retiring in 2017.

On 11 October, Vučević announced that SNS would begin its campaign on 21 October, the day of the party's 15-year anniversary. Despite this, SNS organised gatherings with its supporters before the anniversary to promote the party for the elections. SNS was endorsed by its former party president Vučić, who also announced that Tomislav Nikolić, former president of Serbia and president of SNS, would participate in its campaign. SNS began collecting signatures for its electoral list on 1 November. The party submitted its list to Republic Electoral Commission (RIK) a day later, with 92,637 signatures in total. RIK confirmed its list on 3 November with 88,083 valid signatures collected.

SNS campaigned on populist messages. On 29 October, Vučić announced that by 1 December, the government would distribute din. 10,000 (€85) to 170,000 social assistance recipients and 51,000 blind, elderly, and dementia patients, with students also receiving transport discounts. The government denied that this decision would influence voters. Nemanja Nenadić, representing non-profit organisation Transparency Serbia, contested the government's stance, describing the financial measures as a way to influence voters by appearing to grant concessions. In response to Vučić's campaign, DS submitted a report to the Anti-Corruption Agency, alleging that Vučić allegedly abused power to boost SNS in the elections. The Bureau of Social Research (BIRODI) also claimed that Vučić violated Article 40 of the Law on Prevention of Corruption. Zoran Čvorović, a professor at the Faculty of Law of the University of Kragujevac, argued that President Vučić violated the Serbian constitution by being listed as the representative of all SNS-led electoral lists in the 2023 elections. RIK rejected all 15 citizens' complaints related to Vučić being listed on the SNS-led electoral list, despite not taking part in the elections, saying that "Vučić has agreed on paper for his name to be mentioned on the electoral list" (Vučić pismeno saglasio da svoje ima da jednoj listi). The government of Serbia introduced more populist measures in late November, such as din. 10,000 payouts to high school students.

Despite no longer being the president of SNS, but still serving as president of Serbia, Vučić was its main representative in the election campaign. He was not a candidate in any elections in 2023. Orlić and Nevena Đurić, vice-presidents of SNS, campaigned in Ruma, where they pledged more investments in infrastructure, education, and technology. Another campaign meeting was held on 9 November in Pirot, featuring Vučić, Brnabić, Vučević, Milan Stamatović, and PUPS leader Milan Krkobabić as speakers. SNS also campaigned on improving the status of women and introducing more mammograms in hospitals. The party also expressed its support for the accession of Serbia to the EU. Nikolić made his first public appearance since 2017 at the SNS convention in Belgrade on 2 December.

Stefan Krkobabić, the leader of Party of United Pensioners of Serbia (PUPS) in the National Assembly, expressed his support for SNS during the campaign, while announcing that PUPS would campaign on introducing a guaranteed social pension. The Strength of Serbia Movement, a SNS ally since 2010, announced that they would not contest the 2023 parliamentary election; the Serbian Renewal Movement of Vuk Drašković did not sign a cooperation agreement with SNS for the 2023 election, though two of its candidates still contested the election on the SNS electoral list. Individuals who were formerly critical of SNS and Vučić, including Tatjana Macura, formerly aligned with Enough is Enough (DJB), Radoslav Milojičić, formerly aligned with Democratic Party (DS), and Dejan Bulatović, formerly aligned with Party of Freedom and Justice (SSP), were announced as candidates on the SNS electoral list.

SNS held its last convention in Novi Sad on 13 December.

=== Socialist Party of Serbia ===
The Socialist Party of Serbia (SPS), United Serbia (JS), and Greens of Serbia (Zeleni) signed a cooperation agreement on 1 November, announcing that they would contest the elections together under the same electoral list name, "Ivica Dačić – Prime Minister of Serbia", as they had in the 2022 parliamentary election. The SPS-led coalition submitted its list to RIK on 2 November, with more than 20,000 signatures. RIK confirmed their list on 4 November with 19,618 valid signatures in total. Boban Stojanović argued that RIK should have rejected the SPS electoral list, claiming that a number of signatures of support were certified by notaries who were not listed in the notaries database.

Despite being a coalition government partner with SNS since 2012, SPS official Dušan Bajatović was a target of attacks in articles published by pro-government media. During the campaign period, SPS presented themselves as "guarantees of political stability" (garant političke stabilnosti) while expressing support for youth rights and youth activism. Dačić also portrayed the coalition as socialist; while campaigning in Ljubovija, Dačić said that voting for them also meant voting for "patriotism and socialism" (patriotizam i socijalizam). While campaigning in Mrčajevci, Dačić also said that the SPS coalition supports free education, free universal health care, and social funds. Dačić also reflected on his opinions about Milošević during the campaign, saying that "Milošević was an example of how to love and defend your country" (Milošević bio primer kako se zemlja voli i brani). The SPS coalition also expressed its support for the accession of Serbia to the EU.

=== Serbia Against Violence ===
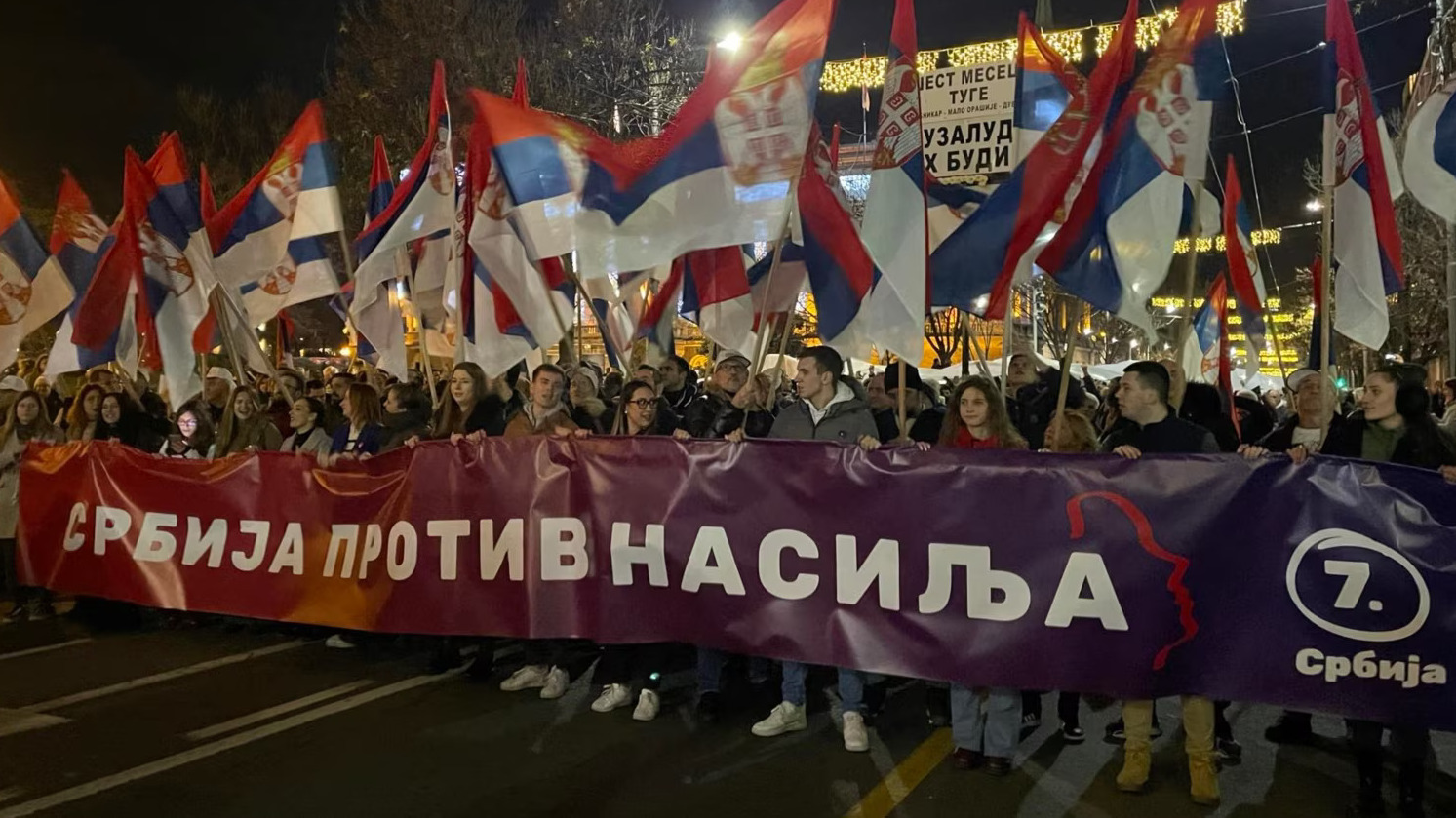
SPN campaigned on increasing pensions, salaries, and investing in education and universal health care

Members of the Serbia Against Violence (SPN) coalition, along with the Romanian Party and the Civic Democratic Party, signed a cooperation agreement on 3 November, saying that the "fight against crime and corruption, stopping inflation and the impoverishment of citizens, restoring pensions reduced in 2014, and the importance of security, especially for the youngest" (Note: borbe protiv kriminala i korupcije, zaustavljanja inflacije ii osiromašenja gradjana, vraćanje penzija smanjenih 2014. godine i značaj bezbednosti, posebno za najmlađe) would be their main issues during the campaign. SPN submitted its electoral list to RIK on 8 November which was confirmed by the next day. While the negotiations were still ongoing, Zoran Lutovac, the president of DS, listed Gordana Matković, a minister under the governments of Zoran Đinđić and Zoran Živković, and Ivan Vujačić, former leader of DS in the National Assembly, as two potential candidates for the position of prime minister. SPN, however, decided to present Tepić and Aleksić as their two main representatives.

Before and during the official campaign period, politicians affiliated with SPN—including Tepić, Miroslav Aleksić, Aleksandar Jovanović Ćuta, and Srđan Milivojević, a DS member of the National Assembly—were subject to negative campaigning in Novi Sad and Belgrade. Pavle Grbović, the president of Movement of Free Citizens (PSG), was also featured on posters that depicted him as an Ustaša. The posters that featured Grbović were promoted by Đorđe Dabić, a SNS state secretary. Aleksić accused Vučić of spreading "old lies" about him, while Grbović filed complaints about the posters. Janko Veselinović, the leader of the Movement for Reversal, was physically assaulted in Novi Sad on 12 November by a director of the public greenery company. SSP offices on Zvezdara, a Belgrade municipality, were attacked by anonymous men on 16 November.

SPN campaigned on returning "stolen pensions" (otete penzije)—the pensions that were lowered by Vučić's government in 2014—and on environmental issues. Ćuta highlighted the issue of poverty and hunger. Radomir Lazović also said that SPN supported removing national broadcast frequency status for Happy and Pink television channels, lowering the inflation and prices, and investing in universal health care protection. Aleksić added that SPN would introduce progressive taxation, while Đilas said that SPN would also increase salaries and invest in education. SPN held its last campaign convention on 12 December in Belgrade, which was attended by several thousand supporters.

=== National Democratic Alternative ===
The National Democratic Alternative (NADA) began its official campaign on 28 October, listing corruption, nepotism, party employment, and rejecting 2023 Ohrid Agreement (an agreement between Serbia and Kosovo) as main issues for the election. NADA submitted its list to RIK on 6 November and RIK confirmed it a day later. Shortly before the official campaign period began, Jovanović was a subject to negative campaigning, that falsely claimed he had released the incumbent prime minister of Kosovo, Albin Kurti, from prison in 2001. Several NADA billboard posters were later torn down on 21 November; NADA accused the government of being behind these acts.

During the campaign period, Miloš Jovanović intensified his criticism of SNS while declining to criticise pro-European parties. He has also called for greater cooperation between opposition parties to topple SNS from power. Jovanović has called for electoral reform, pledging to "destroy the partocracy that SNS created" (akaradna partijska država koju je stvorio SNS). NADA supported the re-introduction of the first-past-the-post system, and campaigned on further regionalisation and decentralisation of Serbia and giving cities and municipalities greater authority over infrastructure and economic matters. NADA also called for the reform of healthcare and agriculture. Vojislav Mihailović of POKS also called for the restoration of the monarchy, saying that "Serbia should be a constitutional, parliamentary monarchy like organised European countries" (da li Srbija treba da bude ustavna, parlamenta kraljevina poput uređenih evropskih zemlje).

Regarding foreign policy, NADA campaigned on wanting strengthening cooperation with the EU in regards to trade, economy, and culture. It did, however, express its opposition to Serbia joining the EU if recognising Kosovo was one of the demands. NADA held its last campaign convention on 10 December.

=== National Gathering ===
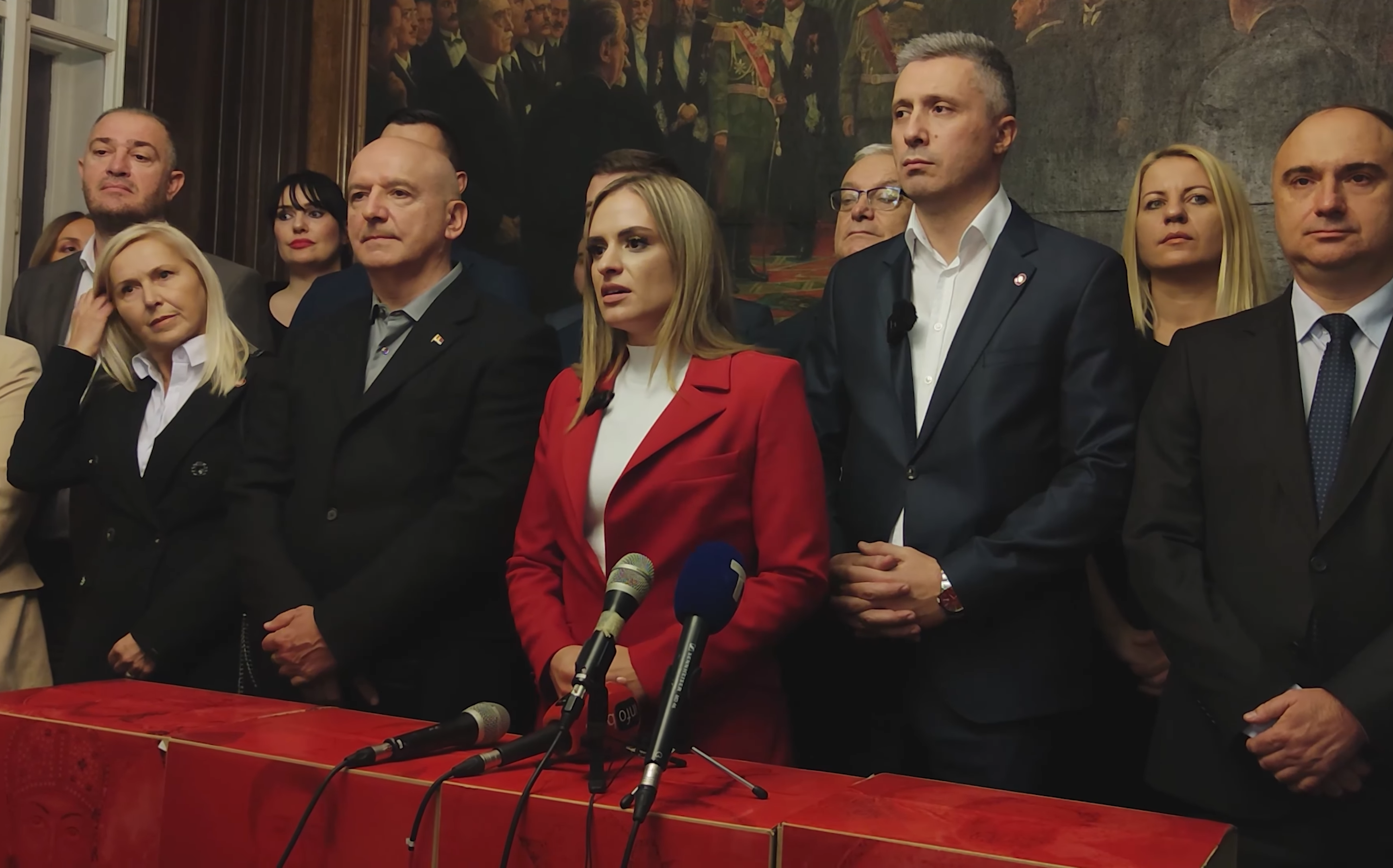
The SSZ–Dveri coalition campaigned on forging closer relations with BRICS, instead of the EU, and opposing the implementation of the Ohrid Agreement

The Serbian Party Oathkeepers (SSZ) and Dveri, the members of the National Gathering coalition, signed another cooperation agreement on 1 November, announcing that they would officially contest the elections together. Boško Obradović identified key priorities for its campaign such as preserving traditional values, affirming Kosovo as part of Serbia, supporting Republika Srpska and Serb communities in neighbouring regions, and promoting ecological patriotism. The coalition submitted its list on 4 November and it was accepted by RIK a day later. At a press conference after they presented their electoral list, Milica Đurđević Stamenkovski emphasised their opposition to the Ohrid Agreement and the EU. The far-right Alternative for Germany party, the Chetnik Ravna Gora Movement, and the clerical-fascist Obraz organisation of Mladen Obradović, voiced their support for the SSZ–Dveri coalition.

During the campaign period, the SSZ–Dveri coalition representatives emphasised their support for greater subsidies for domestic business owners and farmers, the construction of student dormitories in Belgrade, Novi Sad, Niš and Kragujevac, giving free school books, and financial aid for families that are socially vulnerable. Ratko Ristić, one of the representatives of the NO coalition, expressed his support for sovereignism and said the coalition would also look over agricultural issues. Đurđević Stamenkovski also expressed support for reforming the education system. Obradović alleged that the SSZ–Dveri coalition was a target of attacks and media censorship.

On foreign policy, the coalition expressed their support for retaining close relations with China, due to their positions towards Kosovo, and that they would want Serbia to become a member of BRICS instead of the EU. Obradović alleged that regions such as Sandžak, Vojvodina, and parts of eastern Serbia would separate from Serbia if "Serbia gives up on Kosovo" (ako se odrekne Kosova). Đurđević Stamenkovski, in an Insajder interview, did not reject cooperating with SNS after the elections if SNS rejects the Ohrid Agreement. NO held its last campaign convention on 10 December.

=== Serbian Radical Party ===
The Serbian Radical Party (SRS) presented its electoral list to RIK on 3 November, which RIK confirmed it a day later. SRS campaigned on issues such as healthcare reform, saying that Serbia should "use the experiences of foreign, Western European countries, as well as the USA, which has a more developed health system" (da koristimo iskustva stranih, zapadnoevropskih zemalja, kao i SAD koje imaju razvijeniji zdravstveni sistem), advocating greater investments for domestic companies, and preventing bullying by creating "teams of parents, educators, and local municipal officers" (timski rad roditelja dece, prosvetnih radnika i lokalne zajednice). Aleksandar Šešelj also said that SRS supported a ban on NGOs that support the recognition of Kosovo.

In an interview for Radio Television of Vojvodina, Aleksandar Šešelj said that SRS would not join a pro-European government if SRS crosses the electoral threshold. SRS has called for the abandonment of the process of accession of Serbia to the EU and instead called on forging closer ties with Russia and becoming an applicant member of BRICS. Vojislav Šešelj also met with the Palestinian ambassador in Serbia during the campaign; Vojislav Šešelj also criticised Israel, describing their actions towards Palestine as genocidal (Šešelj optužio je danas Izrael da, uz podršku SAD, sprovodi genocid nad Palestincima).

=== Alliance of Vojvodina Hungarians ===
The Alliance of Vojvodina Hungarians (VMSZ), led by acting president Bálint Pásztor, submitted its list to RIK on 7 November. At a press conference after submitting the list, Pásztor said that VMSZ collected 11,355 signatures, more than twice the amount needed for minority parties. RIK confirmed their list on 8 November. Pásztor expressed his support for continuing the cooperation between VMSZ and SNS. VMSZ received support from the Democratic Party of Vojvodina Hungarians and Party of Hungarian Unity in late November.

=== United for Justice ===
The Justice and Reconciliation Party (SPP) and Democratic Alliance of Croats in Vojvodina (DSHV) formalised an electoral alliance under the name United for Justice (UZP) on 4 November. UZP submitted its list to RIK on 9 November, with Zukorlić stating that the coalition would advocate for proportional representation of national communities in public institutions and balanced regional development. Their electoral list was accepted by RIK on 10 November. UZP members expressed their support for remaining in the next government, saying "that members of our communities supported this move" (pripadnici naših zajednica to pozdavili). Zukorlić has described UZP as a pro-European coalition and that "he believes that one day Serbia will nevertheless join the NATO alliance" (veruje da će jednog dana Srbija "ipak pristupiti i NATO alijansi"). DSHV received support from Andrej Plenković, the prime minister of Croatia and leader of the Croatian Democratic Union.

=== Party of Democratic Action of Sandžak ===
The Party of Democratic Action of Sandžak (SDAS) of Sulejman Ugljanin submitted its electoral list to RIK on 16 November, with RIK confirming it on the same day. Its main representative and ballot holder, Selma Kučević, emphasised that SDAS supports decentralisation and regionalism as well as protecting Bosniak minority interests. Ugljanin said that SDAS supported anti-corruption measures and government transparency.

=== Coalition for Peace and Tolerance ===
Following the dissolution of the National Assembly, Jahja Fehratović's For the Future and Development (ZBR) formed a coalition, named "Together for the Future and Development – Coalition for Peace and Development" (KZMT), with Vlach National Party (VNS), Hungarian Civic Alliance (MPSZ), Democratic Union of Croats, Bosniak Civic Party, Party of Montenegrins, Civic Party of Greeks of Serbia, Vojvodina Movement, Tolerance of Serbia, Union of Yugoslavs, Union of Female Roma Network and Non-Roma Network of Serbia, and Union of Banat Romanians. Fehratović was also announced as the coalition's ballot holder. KZMT submitted its electoral list on 17 November. RIK rejected the list on 18 November, stating that out of 6,093 collected signatures, only 4,937 were valid, and that KZMT had to collect the remaining 63 signatures until 20 November. On the same day, KZMT collected 436 more valid signatures and RIK confirmed their electoral list.

=== People's Party ===
After collecting more than 12,500 signatures, the People's Party (Narodna) submitted its electoral list to RIK on 19 November. At a press conference in the building of RIK, Vuk Jeremić said that Narodna would campaign on rejecting the Ohrid Agreement, prohibiting lithium mining, as well as "bringing back sovereignty over the national economy" (vraćanje suvereniteta nad nacionalnom ekonomijom). RIK confirmed their electoral list on 20 November.

Narodna also emphasised its support for introducing military conscription to retain military neutrality, retaining close relations with Russia, and opposing sanctions against Russia, the accession of Serbia to the EU, and the recognition of Kosovo. Jeremić has said that Serbia should seek membership in the European Economic Area instead.

=== DJB–SDS ===
Initially, the Social Democratic Party (SDS) was supposed to take part in the SPN alliance while Enough is Enough (DJB) announced that they would contest the elections independently. SDS was ultimately declined to join SPN, and shortly after in early November, DJB successfully negotiated with SDS and Ana Pejić's Stolen Babies movement to form a joint electoral alliance, mainly centering their opposition to the Ohrid Agreement. The coalition, named Good Morning Serbia, submitted its electoral list to RIK on 22 November. They collected over 11,500 signatures of support. RIK confirmed their electoral list on 23 November, with 10,534 valid signatures.

=== Others ===
The Russian Party, together with the New Communist Party of Yugoslavia (NKPJ), submitted its electoral list on 25 November. On the same day, the Liberal Democratic Party (LDP) of Čedomir Jovanović and the Serbia in the West coalition, composed of Nova–D2SP, Civic Democratic Forum, Liberals and Democrats, and Glas submitted their electoral list. The electoral lists of the citizens group We – Voice from the People (MI–GIN), represented by conspiracy theorist Branimir Nestorović. RIK proclaimed the electoral lists of We – Voice from the People and Serbia in the West on 27 November. On 28 November, the electoral lists of Russian Party–NKPJ and LDP were confirmed by RIK. Jovanović met with Kurti on 3 December, with whom he discussed about Serbia–Kosovo relations.

== Aftermath ==
The elections were ultimately won by SNS, winning 129 out of 250 seats in the National Assembly. Together with SPS, they formed a coalition government led by Vučević of SNS.

In its report, Office for Democratic Institutions and Human Rights (ODIHR) concluded that SNS had a "systematic advantage which created unfair conditions in the elections" (sistematsku prednost koja je stvorila nepravedne uslove) and that Vučić heavily dominated the election campaign, despite not being a candidate in it. According to ODIHR, public funds were abused and the media monitoring body, Regulatory Body for Electronic Media, was not effective during the campaign, and that despite the elections being well organised, they were organised in a "societal and political divided ambience". ODIHR said that the campaign was polarised and met with negative campaigning and fearmongering.

Stefan Schennach, the chief of the delegation of PACE that monitored the elections, said that "the elections were not fair" and that he had seen "ballots that were printed by a photocopier". In a joint statement, Josep Borrell and Olivér Várhelyi, on behalf of the European Commission, said that Serbia's "electoral process requires tangible improvement and further reform". Political scientist Florian Bieber said that irregularities were more prominent in the 2023 elections than in the previous ones. Matthew Miller, the spokesperson of the United States Department of State, called for the government of Serbia to investigate the irregularities that occurred. United States senators Jeanne Shaheen and Pete Ricketts also called for the government to "urgently consider whether elections should be repeated in certain regions", saying that the elections were not free and fair. Andreas Schieder, who monitored the elections on behalf of the European Parliament, criticised Brnabić, saying that "the government should work on solving numerous claims about pressure on voters, vote buying, violating voting secrecy, biased media, and the president's involvement in the campaign".
