= 2009 Serbian local elections =

A small number of municipalities in Serbia held local elections in 2009. These were not part of the country's regular cycle of local elections but instead took place in certain jurisdictions where either the local government had fallen or the last local elections for four-year terms had taken place in 2005.

All local elections in 2009 were held under proportional representation. The direct election of mayors had been introduced in 2002 but was subsequently abandoned in 2007; in 2009, mayors were chosen by elected members of the local assemblies. Parties were required to cross a five per cent electoral threshold (of all votes, not only of valid votes), although this requirement was waived for parties representing national minority communities.

== Results ==
=== Belgrade ===
==== Voždovac ====
The municipal assembly of Voždovac was dissolved on 5 March 2009, after the resignation in January of the municipality's mayor, Goran Lukačević, and the president of its municipal assembly. Lukačević continued to lead a provisional administration pending new elections, which took place on 7 June.

| Party | Votes | % | Seats |
|---|---|---|---|
| Serbian Progressive Party–Tomislav Nikolić | 14,190 | 30.83 | 18 |
| For a European Voždovac–Boris Tadić (Democratic Party, G17 Plus) | 13,785 | 29.95 | 17 |
| Democratic Party of Serbia–New Serbia–People's Party–Vojislav Koštunica | 5,696 | 12.37 | 7 |
| Socialist Party of Serbia–Party of United Pensioners of Serbia–United Serbia–Ivica Dačić | 4,859 | 10.56 | 6 |
| Serbian Radical Party–Dr. Vojislav Šešelj | 2,908 | 6.32 | 3 |
| Liberal Democratic Party–Čedomir Jovanović | 2,481 | 5.39 | 3 |
| "List for Tolerance–Rasim Ljajić" (Sandžak Democratic Party, Roma Social Democratic Party) | 1,576 | 3.42 | 2 |
| Movement of Socialists–Aleksandar Vulin | 388 | 0.84 | – |
| Party "Serbian Accord"–Ljubomir Simić | 88 | 0.19 | – |
| Serbian People's Party | 58 | 0.13 | – |
| Total | 46,029 | 100.00 | 56 |
| Valid votes | 46,029 | 98.18 | |
| Invalid/blank votes | 855 | 1.82 | |
| Total votes | 46,884 | 100.00 | |
| Registered voters/turnout | 148,497 | 31.57 | |

Parliamentarian Marina Raguš led the Radical Party's list and took a seat in the municipal assembly afterwards.

Post-election negotiations for a coalition government were not successful, and another municipal election was held on 6 December 2009.

| Party | Votes | % | Seats |
|---|---|---|---|
| Serbian Progressive Party–Tomislav Nikolić | 23,213 | 37.75 | 26 |
| For a Better Voždovac–Boris Tadić (Democratic Party, Social Democratic Party of Serbia) | 17,829 | 29.00 | 20 |
| Democratic Party of Serbia–New Serbia–Vojislav Koštunica | 5,367 | 8.73 | 6 |
| Socialist Party of Serbia–Party of United Pensioners of Serbia–United Serbia–Ivica Dačić | 4,097 | 6.66 | 4 |
| Liberal Democratic Party–Čedomir Jovanović | 2,962 | 4.82 | – |
| G17 Plus–Mlađan Dinkić | 2,756 | 4.48 | – |
| Serbian Radical Party–Dr. Vojislav Šešelj | 2,239 | 3.64 | – |
| People's Party–Maja Gojković | 1,463 | 2.38 | – |
| None of the Above | 517 | 0.84 | – |
| GEPS for Voždovac–Prof. Dr. Jovan Filipović | 488 | 0.79 | – |
| Party of Veterans of Serbia–General Vukajlo Čađenović | 203 | 0.33 | – |
| Serbia 21–Ivan Markov | 193 | 0.31 | – |
| Forward for the Municipality of Avalski Venac–Zdravko Pršić | 87 | 0.14 | – |
| Serbian Accord–Ljubomir Simić | 74 | 0.12 | – |
| Total | 61,488 | 100.00 | 56 |
| Valid votes | 61,488 | 98.13 | |
| Invalid/blank votes | 1,173 | 1.87 | |
| Total votes | 62,661 | 100.00 | |
| Registered voters/turnout | 149,362 | 41.95 | |

Dragan Vukanić of the Serbian Progressive Party was chosen as mayor on 27 January 2010.

Marina Raguš received the second position on the Radical Party's list.

==== Zemun ====
The municipal assembly of Zemun was dissolved on 5 March 2009, after the assembly failed to adopt its municipal statute by the required deadline. (There was also controversy over a number of disputed mandates claimed by the Radical Party.) Zdravko Stanković of the Democratic Party led a provisional authority pending new elections on 7 June.

| Party | Votes | % | Seats |
|---|---|---|---|
| Serbian Progressive Party–Tomislav Nikolić | 18,296 | 34.61 | 23 |
| "For a European Zemun–Boris Tadić" (Democratic Party, G17 Plus) | 14,913 | 28.21 | 19 |
| Serbian Radical Party–Dr. Vojislav Šešelj | 5,386 | 10.19 | 6 |
| Socialist Party of Serbia (SPS)–Party of United Pensioners of Serbia (PUPS)–United Serbia (JS)–List for Zemun–Ivica Dačić | 3,858 | 7.30 | 4 |
| Democratic Party of Serbia–New Serbia–People's Party–Vojislav Koštunica | 3,777 | 7.15 | 4 |
| Zemun Movement–Prof. Miša Krstić | 2,555 | 4.83 | – |
| Liberal Democratic Party–Čedomir Jovanović | 2,124 | 4.02 | – |
| "List for Tolerance–Rasim Ljajić" (Sandžak Democratic Party, Roma Social Democratic Party) | 1,192 | 2.25 | 1 |
| "Movement of Socialists–Aleksandar Vulin" | 675 | 1.28 | – |
| Party of Serbian Accord–Ana Pavlović | 86 | 0.16 | – |
| Total | 52,862 | 100.00 | 57 |
| Valid votes | 52,862 | 98.22 | |
| Invalid/blank votes | 960 | 1.78 | |
| Total votes | 53,822 | 100.00 | |
| Registered voters/turnout | 152,179 | 35.37 | |

Branislav Prostran of the Progressive Party was chosen as mayor after the election.

=== Vojvodina ===
==== Kovin ====
The Kovin municipal assembly was dissolved by the Serbian authorities on 8 November 2008 after it failed to adopt the country's new municipal statute. Sitting mayor Novica Mijatovič of the Movement for the Revival of Our Municipality list was removed from office, and Slavko Branković of the Democratic Party was appointed to lead a provisional administration. A new election was held on 5 April 2009.

| Party | Votes | % | Seats |
|---|---|---|---|
| For a European Municipality of Kovin–Boris Tadić (Democratic Party, G17 Plus) | 3,556 | 25.68 | 14 |
| Citizens' Group: Movement for the Revival of Our Municipality–Sava Krstić | 2,755 | 19.90 | 10 |
| Serbian Progressive Party–Tomislav Nikolić | 2,522 | 18.22 | 9 |
| Socialist Party of Serbia–United Serbia–For Domestic Kovin | 2,187 | 15.80 | 8 |
| Democratic Party of Serbia–New Serbia–People's Party–Dr. Vojislav Koštunica | 822 | 5.94 | 3 |
| Liberal Democratic Party–Milan Višnjevac | 586 | 4.23 | – |
| Serbian Radical Party–Dr. Vojislav Šešelj | 569 | 4.11 | – |
| Hungarian Coalition–István Pásztor (Alliance of Vojvodina Hungarians, Democratic Party of Vojvodina Hungarians, Vojvodina Hungarian Party) | 458 | 3.31 | 1 |
| Movement of Socialists–Aleksandar Vulin | 390 | 2.82 | – |
| Total | 13,845 | 100.00 | 45 |
| Valid votes | 13,845 | 94.72 | |
| Invalid/blank votes | 771 | 5.28 | |
| Total votes | 14,616 | 100.00 | |
| Registered voters/turnout | 30,035 | 48.66 | |

Slavko Branković of the Democratic Party was confirmed as mayor after the election and served for a full four-year term.

==== Vrbas ====
The municipal government of Vrbas was dismissed in June 2009 due to a breakdown in the local governing coalition and a dysfunctional municipal assembly. A new election was scheduled for 18 October 2009. Željko Vidović of the Democratic Party was appointed as the leader of a provisional administration prior to the election. An explosive device was detonated under his car shortly after he accepted this position, although no-one was in the vehicle at the time.

| Party | Votes | % | Seats |
|---|---|---|---|
| For a European Vrbas–Boris Tadić (Democratic Party–Serbian Renewal Movement–Social Democratic Party of Serbia) | 7,517 | 36.97 | 15 |
| SPS–PUPS–JS–Ivica Dačić | 3,936 | 19.36 | 8 |
| Serbian Progressive Party–Tomislav Nikolić | 2,878 | 14.15 | 6 |
| Serbian Radical Party–Dr. Vojislav Šešelj | 1,563 | 7.69 | 3 |
| DSS–NS–Vojislav Koštunica | 1,249 | 6.14 | 2 |
| Liberal Democratic Party–League of Social Democrats of Vojvodina–List for the Villages | 1,138 | 5.60 | 2 |
| Citizens' Group: There Is Hope | 597 | 2.94 | – |
| Movement of Socialists–Aleksandar Vulin | 545 | 2.68 | – |
| Alliance of Vojvodina Hungarians–István Pásztor | 340 | 1.67 | – |
| Za Vrbas U Plusu–G17 Plus | 305 | 1.50 | – |
| Reformists of Vojvodina–We Love Vojvodina | 266 | 1.31 | – |
| Total | 20,334 | 100.00 | 36 |
| Valid votes | 20,332 | 97.07 | |
| Invalid/blank votes | 614 | 2.93 | |
| Total votes | 20,946 | 100.00 | |
| Registered voters/turnout | 37,176 | 56.34 | |

A new coalition government was formed after the election by the Democratic Party, the Socialist Party, and other parties. Željko Vidović was chosen as mayor. He resigned in 2012 and was replaced by Milan Stanimirović, also of the Democratic Party.

Future mayor Milan Glušac appeared in the fourteenth position on the Progressive Party's list.

=== Central Serbia (excluding Belgrade) ===
==== Kosjerić ====
Željko Prodanović, a member of the Democratic Party of Serbia, was removed from office as mayor of Kosjerić on 26 February 2009, and a provisional administration was established with Milan Štulović of the Democratic Party as its leader. A new election was scheduled for 7 June 2009.

| Party | Votes | % | Seats |
|---|---|---|---|
| Democratic Party–Dragan Vujadinović | 1,832 | 25.57 | 8 |
| Serbian Progressive Party–Tomislav Nikolić | 984 | 13.73 | 5 |
| New Serbia–Velimir Ilić | 952 | 13.28 | 4 |
| Democratic Party of Serbia–Dr. Vojislav Koštunica | 940 | 13.12 | 4 |
| SPS–PUPS–JS Ivica Dačić | 907 | 12.66 | 3 |
| Serbian Renewal Movement–Dr. Ljiljana Kosorić | 576 | 8.04 | 2 |
| G17 Plus–Dr. Svetlana Slavković | 423 | 5.90 | 1 |
| Liberal Democratic Party–Čedomir Jovanović | 378 | 5.27 | 1 |
| Serbian Radical Party Dr. Vojislav Šešelj | 174 | 2.43 | – |
| Total | 7,166 | 100.00 | 28 |
| Valid votes | 7,166 | 98.06 | |
| Invalid/blank votes | 142 | 1.94 | |
| Total votes | 7,308 | 100.00 | |
| Registered voters/turnout | 10,888 | 67.12 | |

Dragan Vujadinović of the Democratic Party was chosen as mayor after the election, leading a coalition government that also included the alliance around the Socialist Party of Serbia, the Serbian Renewal Movement, and G17 Plus. In October 2012, a new governing coalition came to power with Milijan Stojanić of the Serbian Progressive Party as mayor.
