= Zugić =

Zugić is a surname. Notable people with the surname include:

- Igor Zugic (born 1981), Canadian chess player and engineer
- Goran Žugić (1963–2000), Montenegrin policeman and state security operative
- Nikola Zugić (born 1990), Serbian footballer
- Siniša Žugić (born 1969), Serbian diver
