= Marina Raguš =

Serbian politician

- Марина Рагуш

Vice President of the National Assembly of the Republic of Serbia
- Incumbent
- Assumed office 20 March 2024

Member of the National Assembly of the Republic of Serbia
- Incumbent
- Assumed office 3 August 2020
- In office 14 February 2007 – 31 May 2012

Personal details
- Born: 8 July 1969 (age 57) Belgrade, SR Serbia, SFR Yugoslavia
- Party: SRS (1996–2012); SNS (since 2021)
- Occupation: Politician

Marina Raguš (Serbian Cyrillic: Марина Рагуш; born 8 July 1969) is a Serbian politician. She is currently serving her fifth term in Serbia's national assembly. Raguš has been one of the assembly's vice-presidents (i.e., deputy speakers) since March 2024.

Once a prominent member of the far-right Serbian Radical Party (SRS), Raguš joined the Serbian Progressive Party (SNS) in 2021.

== Early life and career ==
Raguš was born in Belgrade, in what was then the Socialist Republic of Serbia in the Socialist Federal Republic of Yugoslavia. She has a bachelor's degree in political science and international relations. Raguš worked part-time for Studio B after her graduation.

== Politician ==
=== Serbian Radical Party ===
==== Early years (1996–2007) ====
Raguš began volunteering with the Radical Party in the Belgrade municipality of Voždovac in 1996 and rose quickly in the party's ranks. The Radicals became part of a federal coalition government in the Federal Republic of Yugoslavia in August 1999, and Raguš was appointed soon afterward as a deputy minister of information, working with Yugoslav Left (JUL) information minister Goran Matić.

Yugoslavian president Slobodan Milošević was defeated in the 2000 Yugoslavian presidential election and fell from power on 5 October 2000, a watershed moment in Serbian politics. A new federal ministry that did not include the Radicals took office the following month, and Raguš's term as a deputy minister came to an end. She also ran for the Belgrade city assembly in Voždovac's tenth division in the 2000 Serbian local elections, which were held concurrently with the presidential vote, and lost to a candidate of the Democratic Opposition of Serbia (DOS).

The Serbian government fell after Milošević's defeat in the Yugoslavian election, and a new Serbian parliamentary election was called for December 2000. Raguš appeared in the 172nd position on the Radical Party's electoral list and did not receive a mandate when the list won twenty-three seats. (From 2000 to 2011, all Serbian parliamentary mandates were assigned to candidates on successful lists at the discretion of the sponsoring parties or coalitions, irrespective of numerical order. Raguš could have been awarded a mandate despite her low list position, though ultimately she was not.)

In 2005, Raguš became an advisor for international relations in the Belgrade municipality of Zemun, where the Radicals led a local coalition government.

==== Parliamentarian (2007–12) ====
Raguš appeared in the sixteenth position on the SRS's list in the 2007 parliamentary election and was this time included in her party's assembly delegation after the list won eighty-one seats. Although the Radicals were the largest party in the parliament that followed, they fell well short of a majority and ultimately served in opposition. During her first parliamentary term, Raguš was a member of the foreign affairs committee and the committee on environmental protection.

She was given the twentieth position on the SRS's list In the 2008 parliamentary election and received a mandate for a second term after the list won seventy-eight seats. The overall results of the election were inconclusive, but the For a European Serbia (ZES) alliance led by the Democratic Party (DS) ultimately formed a coalition government with the Socialist Party of Serbia (SPS), and the Radicals remained in opposition. Raguš also led the SRS's list for Voždovac in the 2008 Serbian local elections, which were held concurrently with the parliamentary vote. The ZES alliance won the election with twenty-four seats and formed a municipal coalition government, while the Radicals won seventeen seats and served in opposition. Raguš did not, at the time, take a seat in the local assembly.

In her second national assembly term, Raguš served on the foreign affairs committee and the committee for development and international economic relations. She was also a member of SRS leader Vojislav Šešelj's defence committee at the International Criminal Tribunal for the former Yugoslavia (ICTY) in The Hague during this time.

The Radical Party experienced a serious split in late 2008, with several members joining the more moderate Serbian Progressive Party (SNS) under the leadership of Tomislav Nikolić and Aleksandar Vučić. Raguš remained with the Radicals. Her public profile was unexpectedly increased in April 2009, when she was the only SRS representative not expelled from a particular session of parliament. Her performance in the assembly received a favourable response in the Serbia media, including from sources not normally inclined to support the Radicals.

Raguš was considered a rising star in the Radical Party in this period, but she did not remain in this role for long. The ZES-led municipal government in Voždovac was unstable, and a new municipal election took place in June 2009. Raguš again led the Radical Party's list. Weakened by the previous year's split, the party fell to only three mandates. This time, she took a seat in the local assembly. Post-election negotiations for a new municipal government were not successful, and yet another local election took place in December 2009. For this campaign, Raguš appeared in the second position on the SRS list. The party continued to lose support and fell below the electoral threshold for assembly representation. Raguš began withdrawing from SRS activities after this time, amid rumours that she was unhappy with the party's strategy in the local campaigns.

She did not appear on the SRS's list for the 2012 Serbian parliamentary election. After the election, she said that she was no longer a member of any party. There were rumours that she would join the Progressives at this time along with fellow disillusioned Radical Aleksandar Martinović, but this did not happen.

During her time out of politics, she was an advisor for a non-governmental organization called the Institute for the Research of Serbian Suffering in the Twentieth Century.

=== Return to political life (2020–present) ===
After eight years out of political life, Raguš contested the 2020 Serbian parliamentary election on the electoral list of Aleksandar Šapić's Serbian Patriotic Alliance (SPAS), appearing in the second position on the list as a non-party candidate. The list won eleven seats, and she was elected to a third parliamentary term. (Serbia's electoral system had been reformed in 2011, such that all mandates were awarded to candidates on successful lists in numerical order.) She was chosen as leader of the SPAS parliamentary group after the election and was also a member of the assembly's administrative committee, (Note: Formally known as the Committee on Administrative, Budgetary, Mandate, and Immunity issues.) a deputy member of the education committee, (Note: Formally known as the Committee on Education, Science, Technological Development, and the Information Society.) the chair of a subcommittee on the information society and digitalization, and a member of Serbia's delegation to the Parliamentary Assembly of the Black Sea Economic Cooperation (PABSEC).

Raguš somewhat belatedly became a member of the SNS in May 2021, when the Serbian Patriotic Alliance merged into the Progressive Party. She was elected to the SNS presidency later in the year.

She received the eighty-sixth position on the SNS-led Together We Can Do Everything coalition list in the 2022 parliamentary election and was re-elected when the list won a plurality victory with 120 out of 250 mandates. After the election, Raguš was chosen as deputy leader of the Together We Can Do Everything parliamentary group. She was also deputy chair of the foreign affairs committee, a deputy member of the European integration committee, and the leader of Serbia's parliamentary friendship group with China.

In May 2022, Vojislav Šešelj received a summons to appear before the International Residual Mechanism for Criminal Tribunals (the successor body to the ICTY) to respond to charges concerning the publication of classified information and the names of protected witnesses. The summons also included the names of seven current and former Radical Party officials, including Raguš. She was ultimately not included in an indictment issued by the court on 11 August 2023.

Raguš was promoted to the eighth position on the SNS's Serbia Must Not Stop list in the 2023 Serbian parliamentary election and was elected to a fifth term when the list won a majority victory with 129 seats. She was again chosen as deputy leader of the SNS coalition's assembly group, and on 20 March 2024 she became a deputy speaker of the assembly. Raguš is also the chair of the foreign affairs committee, a member of the committee on the rights of the child, and once again the leader of Serbia's parliamentary friendship group with China. In June 2024, she led a Serbian delegation that met with Zhao Leji, the chairman of the Standing Committee of the National People's Congress of China, in Beijing.

While presiding over the assembly in October 2025, Raguš controversially chose to continue the work of parliament after a fatal shooting took place outside the assembly building.

Raguš is now seeking re-election to the national assembly in the 2026 Serbian parliamentary election as the fifth-ranked candidate on the SNS-led United Serbia (US) electoral list.

== Electoral record ==
=== Local (City of Belgrade) ===
2000 Belgrade city election: Voždovac Division 10
Candidate	Party	Votes	%
Rebeka Srbinović	Democratic Opposition of Serbia (Affiliation: New Democracy)		elected
Vojislav Milošević	Serbian Renewal Movement		defeated
Marina Raguš	Serbian Radical Party		defeated
Milivoje Todorović	Socialist Party of Serbia–Yugoslav Left		defeated
Total			
Source: All candidates except Srbinović are listed alphabetically.
