= Rebeka Božović =

Serbian administrator, translator, and politician (born 1973)

Rebeka Božović (Serbian Cyrillic: Ребека Божовић; born 1 February 1973), who was known until 2003 as Rebeka Srbinović (Serbian Cyrillic: Ребека Србиновић), is a Serbian administrator, translator, and former politician. She was the deputy mayor of Belgrade from 2003 to 2004. Božović was at one time a prominent member of New Democracy (ND), which was renamed as the Liberals of Serbia (LS) in 2003.

== Early life and career ==
Božović was born in Belgrade, in what was then the Socialist Republic of Serbia in the Socialist Federal Republic of Yugoslavia. She was raised in the city, completed high school in Finland through a student exchange program, and later graduated from the University of Belgrade Faculty of Philology (2001) in Japanese language and literature.

== Politician ==
=== New Democracy spokesperson ===
Božović became active in student protests at the University of Belgrade in 1992 and joined the political organization of New Democracy the following year as a coordinator for youth issues and secretary for international cooperation. In June 1996, at age twenty-three, she became the party's spokesperson. During this period, New Democracy was a junior partner in the Republic of Serbia's coalition government led by the Socialist Party of Serbia (SPS). New Democracy was broadly liberal in its orientation and supported the integration of Serbia into Europe.

Božović welcomed a diplomatic visit to Belgrade by Federation of Bosnia and Herzegovina vice-president Ejup Ganić in July 1996, describing it as an important step in the normalization of relations after the end of the Bosnian War. Later in the year, she supported an agreement between the Serbian government and Kosovo Albanian leader Ibrahim Rugova on the education of Albanian children in Kosovo and Metohija.

During the 1996–1997 Serbian protests, which followed the government's refusal to recognize opposition victories in the 1996 Serbian local elections, Božović called for negotiations on political reform among all of Serbia's parliamentary parties. She welcomed Serbian president Slobodan Milošević's belated recognition of the opposition's victories in the lex specialis of February 1997 and urged the government to follow through on the political, economic, and institutional reforms that it announced in the same period. Božović welcomed the introduction of the Law on Ownership Transformation the following month, describing it as validation of New Democracy's decision to enter government in 1994. Following Milošević's election as president of the Federal Republic of Yugoslavia in July 1997, she urged him to integrate Yugoslavia with European institutions and hasten the pace of economic reform.

New Democracy contested the 1997 Serbian parliamentary election in an alliance with the Socialist Party of Serbia and the Yugoslav Left (JUL). Božović indicated that the party would run on an independent platform and emphasized its status as a modern, pro-European party. She also highlighted the party's support for privatization during the campaign, including in the fields of health and education.

The SPS–JUL–ND alliance won 110 out of 250 seats in the 1997 election, and the far-right Serbian Radical Party (SRS) led by Vojislav Šešelj finished in second place with eighty-two seats. With no party or alliance holding a majority of seats, Božović said that New Democracy would support the creation a new broad-based national unity government, "with the exception, of course, of representatives of Šešelj's Radicals." This did not happen; the SPS and JUL instead formed a coalition with the Radical Party, and New Democracy did not participate in the new administration.

In March 1998, Božović described Kosovo and Metohija as "an integral part of Serbia" and urged both Kosovo Albanian leaders and Serbian authorities to do everything in their power to resolve the status of the province. She also called on Kosovo Albanian leaders to denounce terrorism and said that the existing constitutions of Serbia and Yugoslavia were sufficient to provide autonomy for the Albanian community. Serbia ultimately lost control over most of Kosovo following the 1998–99 Kosovo War and the 1999 NATO bombing of Yugoslavia.

=== Party vice-president, elected official, and deputy mayor ===
New Democracy definitively broke its connections with Serbia's government in the beginning of 1999 and became part of the country's opposition. In the same year, Božović stood down as New Democracy's spokesperson and was elected as a party vice-president with responsibility for public relations, women, and youth issues. She was re-elected as a vice-president in 2000, with responsibility for international relations.

In early 2000, New Democracy joined the Democratic Opposition of Serbia (DOS), a broad and ideologically diverse coalition of parties opposed to Slobodan Milošević's continued rule. DOS candidate Vojislav Koštunica defeated Milošević in the 2000 Yugoslavian presidential election, and Milošević fell from power on 5 October 2000. The DOS also won a landslide victory in Belgrade in the 2000 Serbian local elections, which took place concurrently with the Yugoslavian vote, winning 105 out of 110 seats. Bozović was elected to the Belgrade city assembly as the DOS's candidate in Voždovac's tenth division and afterward supported the local administration. She welcomed the Federal Republic of Yugoslavia's entry into the Organization for Security and Co-operation in Europe (OSCE) in November 2000 while reiterating her party's support for broader integration into European and world institutions.

Božović announced in early 2001 that New Democracy members of the Serbian parliament would attempt to win compensation for media outlets that were damaged under the previous administration's Public Information Act. She later said that the party would introduce two initiatives for the future coexistence of Serbs and Albanians in Kosovo, respectively covering the fields of security and education. In the latter area, she proposed an Educational Council for the whole of the province that would include representatives of the United Nations Interim Administration Mission in Kosovo (UNMIK), members of the newly established Kosovo parliament, and members of the Serbian parliament and government.

At a press conference in October 2001, Božović called for the establishment of a single electoral list for all Serb parties in the upcoming 2001 Kosovan parliamentary election "in order to ensure the survival of our people in Kosovo." She also supported Serbia's Draft Labour Law, which she said would mark a definitive break with socialist self-management and bring Serbia closer to European standards.

Dragan Jočić of the Democratic Party of Serbia (DSS) was dismissed from his role as vice-president of the Belgrade city assembly on 4 July 2003, and Božović was chosen as his successor. At the time, the position was equivalent to deputy mayor.

The renamed Liberals of Serbia contested the 2003 Serbian parliamentary election with their own electoral list, and Božović appeared in the second position. The list did not cross the electoral threshold for assembly representation.

Božović travelled to the Croatian city of Pula in January 2004 to discuss greater cooperation between the Belgrade and Pula youth organizations.

Serbia's local election laws were reformed prior to the 2004 Serbian local elections, such that all city and municipal elections were held under proportional representation with a three per cent electoral threshold. Božović led the LS's electoral list for Belgrade. The party won only 658 votes (0.13%), falling well below the threshold. Her term as deputy mayor ended shortly thereafter.

== Since 2004 ==
Božović later worked as a court interpreter in English and Japanese. She also served for a time as secretary general for Serbia's Packaging Waste Management Association, otherwise known as Sekopak, and has been Executive Manager of the Brewers' Association of Serbia.

== Electoral record ==
=== Local (City of Belgrade) ===
2000 Belgrade city election: Voždovac Division 10
Candidate	Party	Votes	%
Rebeka Srbinović	Democratic Opposition of Serbia (Affiliation: New Democracy)		elected
Vojislav Milošević	Serbian Renewal Movement		defeated
Marina Raguš	Serbian Radical Party		defeated
Milivoje Todorović	Socialist Party of Serbia–Yugoslav Left		defeated
Total			
Source: All candidates except Srbinović are listed alphabetically.
