= Željko Vidović =

Serbian politician

Željko Vidović (Serbian Cyrillic: Жељко Видовић; born 30 May 1964) is a politician in Serbia. He was the mayor of Vrbas from 2009 to 2012 and a member of the Assembly of Vojvodina from 2008 to 2020. Vidović has been at different times a member of the Democratic Party (Demokratska stranka, DS), the Serbian Renewal Movement (Srpski pokret obnove, SPO), and the Movement for the Restoration of the Kingdom of Serbia (Pokret obnove Kraljevine Srbije, POKS).

== Early life and private career ==
Vidović was born in Vrbas, Vojvodina, in what was then the Socialist Republic of Serbia in the Socialist Federal Republic of Yugoslavia. He is a graduate of the University of Belgrade Faculty of Medicine and is a medical doctor with specialization in orthopedic surgery. He has been the director of the general hospital in Vrbas.

== Politician ==
Vidović sought election to the Vrbas municipal assembly in the 2004 local elections, appearing in the sixth position on an independent electoral list led by Miodrag Ivanović. The list did not win any mandates.

=== Democratic Party ===
Vidović subsequently joined the DS. He was first elected to the Vojvodina provincial assembly in the 2008 provincial election, winning the Vrbas constituency seat in the second round. The DS and its allies won the election, and Vidović served as part of the government's assembly majority.

He also appeared in the lead position on the DS's For a European Vrbas list in the concurrent 2008 Serbian local elections. The list won thirteen mandates, finishing second against the list of the far-right Serbian Radical Party (Srpska radikalna stranka, SRS). A local coalition government was subsequently formed by the Radicals, the Socialist Party of Serbia (Socijalistička partija Srbije, SPS), and the Democratic Party of Serbia (Demokratska stranka Srbije, DSS). The DS served in opposition, and Vidović did not take a mandate for the local assembly.

The Radicals experienced a serious split later in 2008, with several members joining the more moderate Serbian Progressive Party (Srpska napredna stranka, SNS). This led to a crisis in the local government, which was dismissed in early 2009; Vidović was appointed as the leader of a provisional administration pending new elections. An explosive device was detonated under his car shortly after he accepted this position, although no-one was in the vehicle at the time. Vidović described this as an attack on the work he was doing rather than on himself.

Vidović again led the DS list for Vrbas in the 2009 local elections and this time led the party to a victory with fifteen of thirty-six mandates; the Socialists finished in second place with eight. In November 2009, a new coalition government was formed by the DS, the SPS, and other parties, and Vidović was appointed as mayor.

In a 2010 interview with Vreme, Vidović discussed the municipality's ongoing issues with pollution in the Great Bačka Canal.

He was re-elected to the Vojvodina assembly in the 2012 provincial election, again winning election in the Vrbas constituency seat. The DS and its allies again won the election, and Vidović continued to serve with its assembly majority. As of late 2012, he was unable to hold a dual mandate as mayor and a member of the assembly. He chose to remain in the provincial assembly and was replaced as mayor by Milan Stanimirović.

=== Serbian Renewal Movement ===
On 24 September 2014, Vidović announced that he had left the DS and joined the SPO. His decision gave the SPO three members in the provincial assembly and allowed them to form their own parliamentary group. In announcing his decision, Vidović indicated that he had not been actively involved in party politics as a DS member over the last two years.

The SPO contested the 2016 provincial election as part of the Progressive Party's alliance. Vojvodina switched to a system of full proportional representation for this election, and Vidović appeared in the twenty-sixth position on the Progressive list. The list won a majority victory with sixty-three out of 120 minutes, and Vidović was elected to a third term.

=== Movement for the Restoration of the Kingdom of Serbia ===
The SPO experienced a serious split in 2017, and the leader of its Vojvodina wing, Žika Gojković, established the POKS as a breakaway party. All three SPO delegates in the provincial assembly, including Vidović, joined the new party. Vidović did not seek re-election in 2020.

== Electoral record ==
=== Provincial (Vojvodina) ===
2012 Vojvodina assembly election Vrbas (constituency seat) - First and Second Rounds
Željko Vidović (incumbent)	Choice for a Better Vojvodina (Affiliation: Democratic Party)	5,529	26.46	9,179	50.14
Milan Milović	Socialist Party of Serbia–Party of United Pensioners of Serbia–United Serbia–Social Democratic Party of Serbia	4,437	21.24	9,129	49.86
Ivan Kankaraš	Let's Get Vojvodina Moving	3,602	17.24		
Branislav Petrović	Serbian Radical Party	1,765	8.45		
Aleksandar Babić	Democratic Party of Serbia	1,281	6.13		
Slavomir Ruskovski	U-Turn	1,256	6.01		
Boris Brajković	Citizens' Group – Dveri	1,236	5.92		
Svetozar Botić	League of Social Democrats of Vojvodina	1,183	5.66		
Maja Bjekić	Maja Gojković – United Regions of Serbia	604	2.89		
Total valid votes		20,893	100	18,308	100

2008 Vojvodina assembly election Vrbas (constituency seat) - First and Second Rounds
Željko Vidović	For a European Vojvodina: Democratic Party–G17 Plus, Boris Tadić (Affiliation: Democratic Party)	7,679	35.09	7,006	55.93
Branislav Petrović	Serbian Radical Party	6,290	28.74	5,520	44.07
Milan Milović	Socialist Party of Serbia–Party of United Pensioners of Serbia	2,950	13.48		
Miroslav Aleksić	Democratic Party of Serbia	2,870	13.11		
Ivica Budinski	Coalition: Together for Vojvodina - Nenad Čanak	1,248	5.70		
Zoran Simićević	Liberal Democratic Party	847	3.87		
Total valid votes		21,884	100	12,526	100
Invalid ballots		955		263	
Total votes casts		22,839		12,789	
