= Ljiljana Kosorić =

Serbian politician (born 1957)

Ljiljana Kosorić (Serbian Cyrillic: Љиљана Косорић; born 10 November 1957) is a politician in Serbia. She served in the National Assembly of Serbia from 2014 to 2016 as a member of the Serbian Renewal Movement (Srpski pokret obnove, SPO).

== Private career ==
Kosorić is a pediatrician. She lives in Kosjerić.

== Politician ==
=== Municipal politics ===
Kosorić appeared at the head of the SPO's electoral list for Kosjerić in the 2009 Serbian local elections. The list won two mandates, and the SPO subsequently participated in a coalition government in the municipality. Kosorić was appointed to the municipal council (i.e., the executive branch of the municipal government) on 14 July 2009. The entire council, including Kosorić, left office on 5 October 2012.

She again led the SPO list for Kosjerić in the 2013 local elections and received the right to serve in the municipal assembly when the list again won two mandates. She declined her mandate.

=== Parliamentarian ===
Kosorić was included on the SPO's list for the 2007 Serbian parliamentary election. The list did not cross the electoral threshold to win representation in the assembly. The SPO later formed an alliance with the Liberal Democratic Party and other parties called U-Turn (Preokret) for the 2012 parliamentary election, and Kosorić received the twenty-eighth position on their list. The list won nineteen mandates, and she was not elected.

The SPO then joined the coalition around the Serbian Progressive Party and contested the 2014 parliamentary election on that party's Aleksandar Vučić — Future We Believe In list. Kosorić was given the ninety-third position and was elected when the list won a majority victory with 158 out of 250 mandates. During the 2014–16 parliament, she was a member of the health and family committee and the parliamentary friendship groups with France and Russia. She was also a member of the informal green parliamentary group and served on a working group that developed a code of conduct for delegates.

She was given the 214th position on the successor Aleksandar Vučić – Serbia Is Winning list in the 2016 parliamentary election. This was too low a position for direct re-election to be a realistic possibility, and indeed she was not re-elected when the list won 131 mandates.

Kosorić has served as a vice-president of the SPO.
