= Predrag Marsenić =

Serbian politician

- Предраг Марсенић
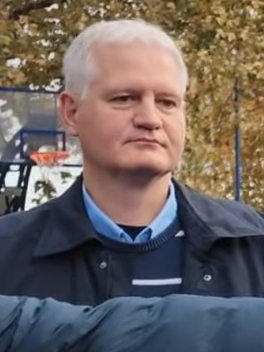
- Marsenić in 2023

Member of the National Assembly
- Incumbent
- Assumed office 1 August 2022
- President: Vladimir Orlić

Personal details
- Born: 1970 (age 55–56) Belgrade, SR Serbia, SFR Yugoslavia
- Party: DSS/NDSS (2007–present)
- Education: University of Belgrade
- Occupation: Engineer, politician

Predrag Marsenić (Serbian Cyrillic: Предраг Марсенић; born 1970) is a Serbian engineer and politician who has been a member of the National Assembly since 1 August 2022. He is a vice president of the New Democratic Party of Serbia (NDSS).

== Biography ==
Marsenić was born in 1970 in Belgrade, SR Serbia, SFR Yugoslavia. He graduated from the Belgrade Mathematical Gymnasium and the Faculty of Mechanical Engineering, University of Belgrade, where he earned a degree in mechanical engineering.

Following his graduation, he worked as a math professor and later emigrated to Canada where he worked in several companies on the development of prototypes and production of finished products in the precision mechanics industry.

After returning to Serbia, he worked for GSP Belgrade, passed the professional exam prescribed for a graduate mechanical engineer and worked in the management of infrastructure projects in the field of thermotechnics, process and gas engineering.

He is the author of numerous projects in the field of thermotechnics.

He is a member of the Serbian Chamber of Engineers and the Society of Mechanical and Electrical Engineers and Technicians of Serbia.

=== Political career ===
He joined the Democratic Party of Serbia (DSS) in 2007 and later became a vice president of the party.

In the 2022 general election, DSS contested as part of the National Democratic Alternative (NADA) alliance and Marsenić was elected member of the National Assembly.
