= Information Directorate (Serbia and Montenegro) =

The Information Directorate (Serbian Cyrillic: Дирекција за информисање, romanized: Direkcija za informisanje) was government agency in the State Union of Serbia and Montenegro. It existed from July 2003 until June 2006, when the state union dissolved.

Previous iterations of the information directorate had existed in the Federal Republic of Yugoslavia from 1994 to 2003, and there was briefly a Ministry of Information (Serbian Cyrillic: Министарство информисања, romanized: Ministarstvo informisanja) in the Yugoslavian government from 1999 to 2000.

A similar government agency also existed in the time of the Socialist Federal Republic of Yugoslavia.

== History ==
The federal Information Secretariat (Serbian Cyrillic: Секретаријат за информисање, romanized: Sekretarijat za Informisanje) was established in September 1994. Although not a government ministry in the strict sense, it was overseen by a member of the federal government. The first secretary for information was Dragutin Brčin, a member of the Socialist Party of Serbia (SPS). In March 1997, Brčin was succeeded by Goran Matić of the Yugoslav Left (JUL).

The Serbian Renewal Movement (SPO) joined Yugoslavia's federal government in January 1999, and prominent party member Milan Komnenić was named as secretary for information on 18 January of that year. His term in office was brief. SPO leader Vuk Drašković was fired from the government on 28 April 1999, at which time the party's other ministers, including Komnenić, resigned in a demonstration of solidarity. The position was not immediately filled after this, although in practice Goran Matić (who was by this time a minister without portfolio in the Yugoslavian government) seems to have taken on its responsibilities again.

The Yugoslavian federal government was restructured on 12 August 1999, and Matić was chosen to oversee the newly created ministry of information. He held this role for more than a year. After the fall of Slobodan Milošević and the coming to power of a new ministry under the Democratic Opposition of Serbia (DOS), the ministry was dissolved and the information secretariat re-established. Slobodan Orlić of Social Democracy (SD) was named as secretary for information on 6 December 2000.

The Federal Republic of Yugoslavia was restructured as the State Union of Serbia and Montenegro in March 2003. On 11 July 2003, Orlić was appointed to oversee the newly established information directorate. He did not, in this iteration of the role, serve on the federation's council of ministers. Orlić resigned from the directorship in September 2005, when his party withdrew support from the government. The final director of the information directorate was Ivan Cvejić, who oversaw the agency on an acting basis in a more technical capacity.

== Responsibilities ==
The information directorate had the following responsibilities as of 2004:

- informing the public about the work of the government of Serbia and Montenegro
- reviewing domestic and international coverage of the government
- studying the public's response to the dissemination of information on the government's work and familiarizing the government with the same
- overseeing the state union's registry
- performing other responsibilities in accordance with the laws of the state union and its member states

== List of ministers and directors ==
=== Federal Republic of Yugoslavia (1994–2003) ===
Political Party: SPS JUL SPO SD SDP

Name	Party	Term of Office		Prime Minister
Secretary for Information
Dragutin Brčin (born 1952)	SPS	15 September 1994	27 March 1997	Kontić
Goran Matić (born 6 June 1959)	JUL	27 March 1997	18 January 1999	Kontić • Bulatović
Milan Komnenić (8 November 1940 – 24 July 2015)	SPO	18 January 1999	28 April 1999	Bulatović
Minister for Information
Goran Matić (born 6 June 1959)	JUL	12 August 1999	4 November 2000	Bulatović
Secretary for Information (re-established)
Slobodan Orlić (born 1971)	SD (2000–2002)	6 December 2000	7 March 2003	Žižić • Pešić
Slobodan Orlić (born 1971)	SDP (2002–2003)	6 December 2000	7 March 2003	Žižić • Pešić

=== Serbia and Montenegro (2003–2006) ===
Political Party: SDP

Name	Party	Term of Office	
Director of the Information Directorate
Slobodan Orlić (born 1971)	SDP	11 July 2003	9 September 2005
Ivan Cvejić (acting) (born 2 October 1969)	non-party	9 September 2005	5 June 2006
