= Dejan Radenković =

Serbian politician

Dejan Radenković (Serbian Cyrillic: Дејан Раденковић; born September 9, 1971) is a politician in Serbia. He has served in the National Assembly of Serbia on an almost continuous basis since 2008 as a member of the Socialist Party of Serbia.

== Early life and career ==
Radenković was born in Priština, Socialist Autonomous Province of Kosovo, in what was then the Socialist Republic of Serbia in the Socialist Federal Republic of Yugoslavia. Raised in the city, he graduated in economics from the University of Priština and later earned a second degree from the private EDUCONS university in Sremska Kamenica. He was active in several youth organizations in Kosovo and Metohija and was a member of the Socialist Party's youth organization. He has worked for First Global Brokers and Orbita Communications; since 2010, Radenković has worked in a senior management capacity for the company Ratko Mitrović a.d.

== Political career ==
Radenković received the 199th position on an electoral list led by the Socialist Party in the 2008 Serbian parliamentary election. The list won twenty mandates, and Radenković was not initially selected as part of the party's assembly delegation. (From 2000 to 2011, Serbian parliamentary mandates were awarded to sponsoring parties or coalitions rather than to individual candidates, and it was common practice for mandates to be awarded out of numerical order. Radenković could have been awarded a mandate despite his low position on the list, which was in any event mostly alphabetical. In the event, however, he was not.) He was, however, given a mandate on July 16, 2008, as the replacement for another Socialist member who had resigned to take a government position. The Socialist Party was a junior partner in a coalition government with the For a European Serbia alliance led by the Democratic Party during this time, and Radenković served with its parliamentary majority. He also served as deputy chair of the assembly committee on Kosovo and Metohija.

Radenković was also the Socialist Party of Serbia's main board co-ordinator for Kosovo and Metohija in this period. In 2010, he took part in negotiations to establish a new coalition government between the Democratic Party and the Socialist Party in Novo Brdo and other Serb municipalities in the region.

Serbia's electoral system was reformed again in 2011, such that parliamentary mandates were awarded in numerical order to candidates on successful lists. Radenković was given the thirty-sixth position on the Socialist-led list and was re-elected when the list won forty-four mandates. The Socialist Party formed a new coalition government with the Serbian Progressive Party after the election. Radenković subsequently supported talks between the governments of Serbia and Kosovo to guarantee stability in the region and was part of the Kosovo Serb delegation that led to the 2013 Brussels Agreement to normalize relations between the two entities.

Radenković received the forty-seventh position on the Socialist-led list in the 2014 parliamentary election and, as the list once again won forty-four seats, was not initially re-elected. He was, however, awarded a new mandate on 10 May 2014 as a replacement for as a replacement for Aleksandar Antić, who had resigned to continue in a ministerial position in the government of Serbia. In this sitting of the assembly, he served as chair of the spatial planning, transport, infrastructure, and telecommunications committee.

He received the thirty-eighth position on the Socialist-led list in the 2016 election; the list won twenty-nine mandates and he was once again not initially elected. He received a new mandate on 19 July 2017 as a replacement for Branko Ružić, who resigned to take a cabinet position. The Socialist Party has continued as part of Serbia's coalition government throughout this time.

Radenković is currently a member of Serbia's European integration committee, a member of its delegation to the NATO Parliamentary Assembly (where Serbia has associate status), the leader of its parliamentary friendship group with the United Kingdom, and a member of its parliamentary friendship groups with Armenia, Azerbaijan, Bosnia and Herzegovina, Croatia, Georgia, Germany, Greece, Hungary, Italy, Macedonia, Montenegro, Slovenia, Spain, Switzerland, Turkey, and the United States of America.
