= Zdravko Stanković =

Serbian politician

Zdravko Stanković (Serbian Cyrillic: Здравко Станковић; born December 4, 1980) is a politician in Serbia. He has served in the National Assembly of Serbia since 2016 as a member of the Social Democratic Party (Socijaldemokratska stranka, SDS).

== Early life and career ==
Stanković is an economist. He was a member of the oppositionist group Otpor! in 2000 and took part in protests against Slobodan Milošević's administration. In August 2000, he was arrested while handing out invitations to an opposition film screening.

== Political career ==
Stanković was chair of the municipal assembly of Zemun, Belgrade, from 2000 to 2004 and chair of the municipality's provisional council in 2009. From 2008 to 2012, he served on the steering board of Belgrade's directorate for urban planning and construction. In this period, he was a member of the Democratic Party (Demokratska Stranka, DS),

Stanković received the 222nd position on the Choice for a Better Life coalition electoral list led by DS leader Boris Tadić in the 2012 Serbian parliamentary election. This was too low a position for election to be a realistic possibility, and indeed he was not elected.

The Democratic Party subsequently split into two factions, with Tadić creating a breakaway group called the New Democratic Party in 2014. This group contested the 2014 election in a fusion with the Greens of Serbia and in alliance with other parties; following the election, the New Democratic Party was reconstituted as the SDS. Stanković sided with Tadić in the split, was a founding member of the new party, and has held positions in its leadership. He appeared in the twenty-ninth position on Tadić's list in the 2014 election; the list won eighteen mandates and he was once again not elected.

Stanković was promoted to the thirteenth position on a coalition list of the SDS and other parties in the 2016 parliamentary election and was elected when the list won thirteen mandates. Serbian Progressive Party and its allies won the election, and the SDS serves in opposition. Stanković is currently a member of the committee on the economy, regional development, trade, tourism, and energy; a deputy member of the committee on spatial planning, transport, infrastructure, and telecommunications; a member of a working group for the political empowerment of persons with disabilities; and a member of the parliamentary friendship groups with Algeria, Azerbaijan, Egypt, Israel, Kazakhstan, the Macedonia, and the countries of Sub-Saharan Africa.
