= Goran Žugić =

Montenegrin policeman

Goran Žugić (May 11, 1963 in Tuzla, SR Bosnia-Herzegovina, SFR Yugoslavia – May 31, 2000 in Podgorica, Montenegro, FR Yugoslavia) was a Montenegrin policeman and state security operative. He was also the personal aide and a close friend to Montenegrin statesman Milo Đukanović.

Due to his position as the national security adviser to Montenegrin president Milo Đukanović, Žugić's May 2000 assassination in Podgorica sparked Balkan-wide reaction from political circles. The investigation carried out by the Montenegrin police never produced a suspect. In the years since, a lot of additional information and speculation has surfaced about his role in the Montenegrin state apparatus and alleged involvement in cigarette smuggling.

== Early life and career ==
Born and raised in the northern Bosnian city of Tuzla to Montenegrin parents (father Vukola from Žabljak and mother Poleksija Đurović from a village near Danilovgrad) who worked as school teachers, Žugić graduated from the University of Sarajevo's Faculty of Law. In 1988 he found employment at SR Bosnia-Herzegovina's Secretariat of the Interior (SUP), before advancing to the position of sector chief at state security's Tuzla branch in 1991.

War soon broke out in Bosnia, and the Žugić family, including 29-year-old Goran and his brother Igor, fled to Montenegro. Goran Žugić's law enforcement career continued in the coastal town of Herceg Novi where in 1992 he became the assistant chief at the local police branch (Centar za javnu bezbjednost Herceg Novi). He soon got promoted to the main chief role.

Following the 1995 turmoil at the Podgorica police branch that prompted removal of Interior Minister Nikola Pejaković, Žugić got his next big promotion, moving up to capital Podgorica where he continued in the police chief role at the Centar bezbjednosti Podgorica. In addition to the capital city, the police branch Žugić was now heading also had jurisdiction over the towns of Cetinje, Danilovgrad, and Kolašin. Once there, Žugić, along with Montenegin police, was loyal to Prime Minister Milo Đukanović and remained so as the power struggle between Đukanović and president Momir Bulatović began. Žugić had a key organizational role after Đukanović got inaugurated as the president of Montenegro following the controversial 1997 presidential elections and violent protests by Bulatović's loyalists in January 1998.

Following his continued alignment with Milo Đukanović, Žugić was appointed as his national security adviser. During this period, media reports and political observers identified Žugić as an influential figure within the administration, attributing to him involvement in oversight related to the country's cigarette smuggling trade. Reports also noted his close relationship with businessman Stanko "Cane" Subotić.

== Death ==
On Wednesday night, May 31, 2000, past 23:00 CET, Žugić parked his Audi A6 close to his apartment building at 7 Save Kovačevića Boulevard in Podgorica. He got out of the vehicle and walked over towards the building entrance when he got approached from behind by a single person who killed him with a succession of shots to the head from an automatic weapon.

Žugić's assassination happened to occur at an extremely tense time in the relations of Montenegro and Serbia (federal units within FR Yugoslavia) with federal Yugoslav president Slobodan Milošević (not supported by the West at the time and accused of war crimes by The Hague tribunal) and Montenegrin president Đukanović (openly supported by the West at the time) locked in an ongoing power struggle. It also came as the latest in a wave of assassinations of prominent mobsters and high political and politically connected figures in FR Yugoslavia (Žugić's was among the first to take place on the territory of Montenegro). It also happened to occur days before the June 11th local municipal elections in Herceg Novi and Podgorica.

== Reaction ==
=== Press reaction ===
Due to the tense political circumstances during which the murder occurred, some English-language Western media outlets like The Guardian and the Los Angeles Times were quick to indirectly point out a possible connection to similar events in Serbia at the time (Serbia was going through its own wave of assassinations in the first part of 2000). They went as far as to cautiously suggest Žugić's assassination was an attempt by Belgrade to destabilize Montenegro ahead of its first elections after the 78-day 1999 NATO bombing of FR Yugoslavia. Others, like the Italian Corriere della Sera went even further, saying that "Montenegro and Serbia have for months been at the edge of separation" and that "this tragic event brought the possibility of a compromise between them down to a minimum" before ominously exclaiming: "If another war flares up in the Balkans we will have known its start date in advance as well its detonator".

=== Montenegrin official reaction ===
The reaction of certain Montenegrin officials went along the similar dramatic lines. Speaking on the day after the assassination, President of the republic Milo Đukanović said:

"Whoever targeted Goran Žugić committed a terrorist act against democracy in Montenegro and against the security of Montenegrin citizens. And let me deliver a message to those who might be happy about this crime that Montenegro will not become hesitant nor discouraged from continuing with the state policy that will guide the republic along the path of peace into the company of developed European countries as a stable, democratic, and open multiethnic society".

Montenegirn Minister of Justice Dragan Šoć from the pro-Serbian People's Party was more restrained: "We are dealing with a murder like those we have seen outside Montenegro (namely in Serbia) and that is disturbing. I cannot give you any details because that would be speculating on motives". While leading pro-Đukanović regime Podgorica lawyer Ranko Vukotić went the furthest, arguing that the killing was part of a "deliberate campaign" to destabilize Montenegro, presumably by Yugoslav President Slobodan Milošević and his Montenegrin supporters.

=== EU reaction ===
Even EU foreign policy and security chief Javier Solana felt a need to react, "strongly condemning the, it is becoming increasingly obvious, politically motivated murder of high Montenegrin official Goran Žugić". "EU condemns any attempt to undermine the reform process in Montenegro and to undermine the preparations for the upcoming local elections".

=== Belgrade's official reaction ===
Milošević's regime in Belgrade wasn't without reaction either with controversial Yugoslav federal Minister of Information Goran Matić on June 6, 2000 directly accusing Montenegrin security officials Vukašin Maraš and Darko "Beli" Raspopović of being involved in Žugić's murder, which, according to Matić, took place with CIA's organizational and logistical support. At the same press-conference, Matić accused CIA of having an "organized group for the logistical preparation of terrorist acts on FR Yugoslavia's territory". Matić even named names, accusing James Schweigert (State Department's Balkans work group chief answering directly to James F. Dobbins, Assistant Secretary of State for European Affairs) of being the terrorist group's coordinator with Sean Berns (American office's chief in Dubrovnik) and Paul Davis (USAID worker in Dubrovnik) as his close accomplices.

== Funeral ==
Žugić was buried at Podgorica's Čepurci cemetery on Friday, June 2, 2000 with highest Montenegrin regime officials, including Milo Đukanović, Svetozar Marović, and, Filip Vujanović in attendance.

The task of speaking for the regime went to its officials Miomir Mugoša and Miodrag "Miško" Vuković. Speaking about Žugić, Mugoša said: "He was brave and decisive when it came to defending Podgorica and the peace of its citizens, but wise when it came to controlling and calming the various divisions, so inherently traditional in our society... Thanks to him, our city had the reputation of being secure, and remained so. Nobody will make us tentative and indecisive, we refuse to become fearful and afraid of the criminal hand that gunned down Goran Žugić while aiming at Podgorica and Montenegro, or any other such hand for that matter". Vuković added that "gunshots at Goran Žugić are strikes at all of us who see Montenegro the same way he did; gunshots at him are strikes at Montenegrin democracy, at our future, at our joint living, humanly, and stately ideal".

== Aftermath, speculation, and accusations ==
Since the Montenegrin police never even produced a suspect, let alone arrest anyone in connection with Žugić's assassination, the crime became a subject of rife public debate in the years since, especially in light of the fact that it turned out to be only the first in a series of assassinations of prominent individuals in Montenegro and those with ties to the tiny republic. Less than five months after Žugić, Vanja Bokan, prominent alleged cigarette smuggler with connections to Montenegrin regime, was killed in Athens, Greece. In January 2001, Žugić's police colleague Beli Raspopović was gunned down in broad daylight on a Podgorica street. Couple of months after that, Blagota "Baja" Sekulić, another operative with ties to Montenegrin regime, was murdered in Budva. In another similarity to Žugić's murder no suspects were produced for these murders nor was anyone arrested.

=== 2001 Nacional affair ===
In May 2001, Žugić's name featured prominently in the series of articles on Stanko Subotić and cigarette smuggling through Montenegro in Croatian weekly news magazine Nacional, all of which soon became known as the 'tobacco affair' or 'Nacional affair'. In the series' very first article written by journalist Jasna Babić it was explicitly mentioned that Žugić was murdered by Beli Raspopović. In the interview for the magazine couple of issues later, Srećko Kestner, former Subotić's aide who got into the cigarette smuggling business through Vanja Bokan, named Žugić as an important cog in 'tobacco mafia':

"I met Žugić not too long after Subotić got into the business. At the time Žugić just got named to the post of Podgorica police chief. His units were under direct orders from Đukanović, providing secure escort for trucks full of cigarettes to make sure they safely leave Montenegro before entering Serbia. He also gave me police escort when some local criminals tried to extort me - 11 policemen from Podgorica police intervention unit were with me at all times. In return I was buying vehicles for Podgorica police.... For his services and involvement in smuggling, Žugić was getting paid DM100,000 per month.... When I partly financed Milo Đukanović's 1997 presidential election campaign with some $3-4 million, I submitted the money through Žugić, and therefore I never met Đukanović face to face. When his political opponent Momir Bulatović called Đukanović out publicly on television for having his campaign financed by a 'cigarette smuggler Kestner', Đukanović responded that he never even met me, which was actually true".

=== Ratko Knežević's accusations in 2009 ===
On August 12, 2009, in a lengthy letter to Belgrade high circulation daily Blic, former Montenegrin regime insider Ratko Knežević who was the chief of Montenegrin trade mission in Washington, D.C. during the mid-1990s as well as another one of Milo Đukanović's close friends, gave a detailed account of the information he claims to know about the various assassinations in Montenegro in terms of who planned, ordered and committed them. It's been speculated before that Knežević was the unnamed source for many of the claims in Nacional, however this was the first time he personally named names and talked directly about alleged crimes.

Writing in response to Stanko Subotić's denials of smuggling (that which Knežević accused him of in July 2009 interviews to Blic, Vijesti, and NIN), Knežević now wrote a letter to Blic accusing Subotić, Jovica Stanišić and Đukanović of ordering the murder of smuggler Vanja Bokan as far back as 1997 and originally getting Serbian mobster and state security operative Željko "Arkan" Ražnatović to organize it. He also accused them of ordering and signing off on Radovan "Badža" Stojičić's assassination in April 1997, which according to Knežević was organized and carried out by Beli Raspopović and his unit.

Meanwhile, according to Knežević, the preparations for Bokan's murder stalled because Arkan had more pressing concerns at the time so the logistical part of the job went to Goran Žugić who in the meantime rose to be one of Đukanović's most trusted confidants and partners in cigarette smuggling while the immediate assassin job went to Baja Sekulić - thus by 1999/2000, the Bokan murder was logistically planned out and prepared. However, according to Knežević, this didn't sit well with Beli Raspopović who was by this time completely squeezed out of the cigarette smuggling profit sharing and furthermore saw Žugić rise to the role he once occupied - regime's top security operative. Raspopovic thus, according to Knežević, decided to strike and take out both Žugić and Sekulić. According to Knežević, Raspopović managed to kill Žugić but couldn't pull off the same with Sekulić who in the meantime killed Bokan in Greece in October 2000 and later managed to eliminate Raspopović in Podgorica through a paid assassin brought in from Republika Srpska.

== Personal ==
Žugić was married to Nataša who worked in the pharmaceutical industry. They have two children: son Andrej who was three years old at the time of his father's assassination and daughter Tara who was 11 months old.
