= Brankica Stanković =

Serbian investigative journalist

- Бранкица Станковић
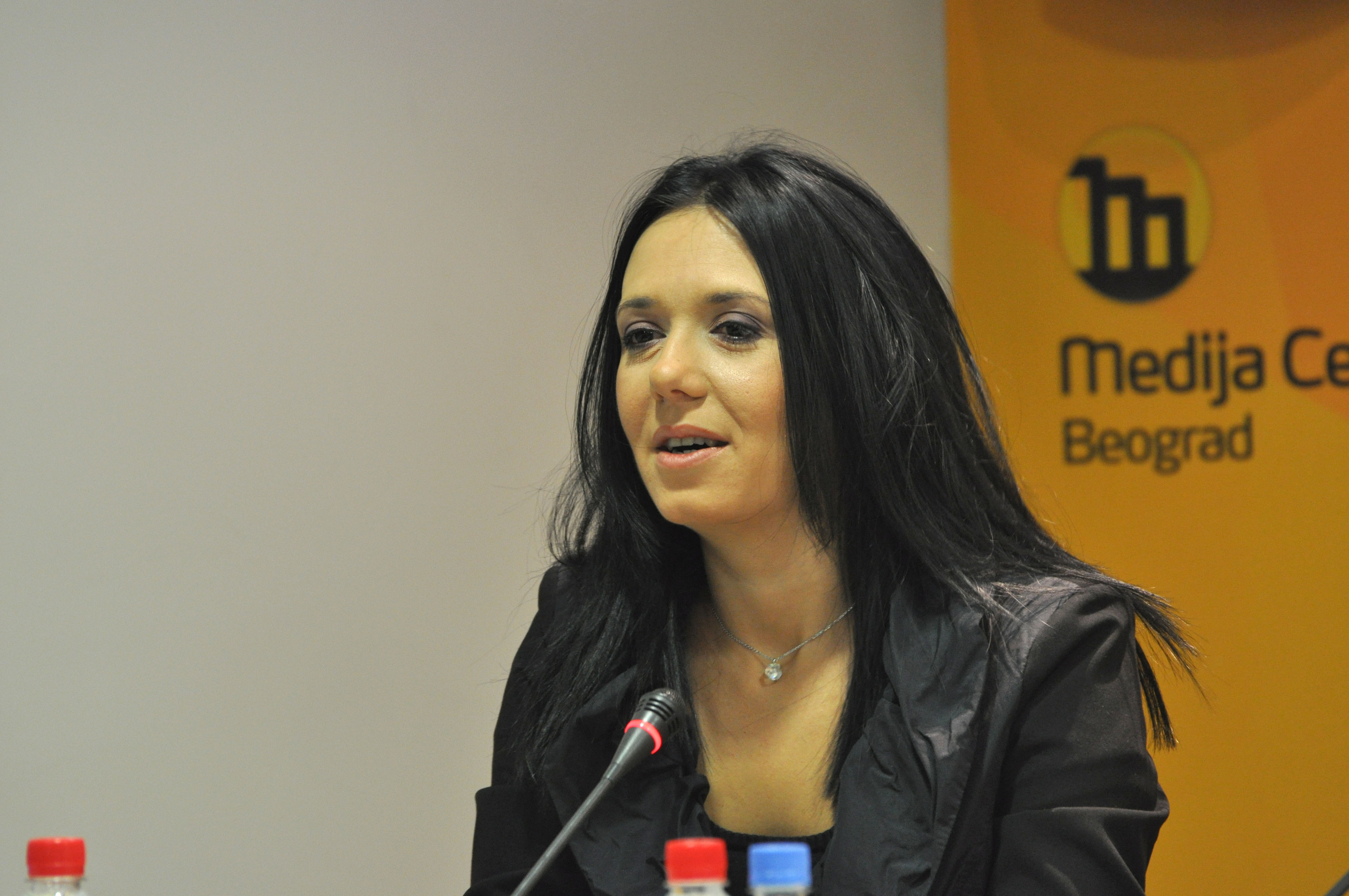
- Stanković at the 2009 Jug Grizelj Award ceremony in January 2010.
- Born: October 14, 1975 (age 51); Belgrade, SFR Yugoslavia
- Occupation: Journalist
- Years active: 1996—present
- Employer: B92
- Known for: Insajder

Brankica Stanković (Serbian Cyrillic: Бранкица Станковић; born October 14, 1975) is a prominent Serbian investigative journalist reporting on topics of crime and political corruption in Serbia. She is the main writer of the investigative television news programme Insajder (Serbian for "Insider") produced by the B92 television between 2004 and 2015, and by Stanković's own news production company since 2016.

Her reports led to much controversy, and she routinely receives death threats. For that reason, she has been placed under 24 hours police protection since December 2009.

== Early career ==
Stanković was born in Belgrade, Serbia (then SFR Yugoslavia) in October 1975. After high school graduation, she enrolled a private acting school, but quit after two years. She began her career as a journalist for radio and television company RTV Studio B in 1996, where she spent a year. In 1997, she switched to Radio B92, where she has been working ever since. During the 1990s, B92 was a prominent pro-democracy news broadcasting company, opposed to the corrupt regime of then-president Slobodan Milošević. During her early career, she was the editor of B92 radio news programming, and was a screenwriter for such weekly programs as Jutopija and Apatrija. She also worked as a foreign correspondent for Sveriges Radio and German Westdeutscher Rundfunk.

== B92 ==
In 2004, B92 television launched a program called Insajder (Insider), with Stanković as chief editor. It is an investigative TV program whose aim is to expose political corruption and political crime in Serbia. Since 2004, nineteen seasons of Insajder were broadcast, two each year, with each season containing between two and nine episodes, 82 episodes in total (as of October 2013). The first season of Insajder was about the political aspects of the assassination of Zoran Đinđić. While working on this topic, the Insajder crew found out that after Milorad Ulemek, Đinđić's assassin, was arrested, he was not taken to the police custody, but to the office of then Minister of Internal Affairs Dragan Jočić. Later episodes investigated such topics as: the Customs Mafia case, high-profile cigarette smuggling, and secret transfers of state money to Cyprus. This led to the arrest of former Director of Customs Bureau Mihalj Kertes. Other episodes investigated corruption in RB Kolubara, links between politicians and football hooligans and other extremist groups, corruption with privatization of state-owned companies, corruption in RTB Bor and many other major cases of political corruption and crime.

After reporting on the criminal records of many football hooligan leaders and their links with mafia and politicians in 2009, Stanković received multiple death threats from hooligans. The most infamous incident occurred on 16 December 2009 during the UEFA Europa League football game between FK Partizan and FC Shakhtar Donetsk when a group of hooligans supporting FK Partizan stabbed with knives an inflatable doll representing Stanković. During the incident, hooligans chanted "You're like a serpent, you'll follow Ćuruvija, Brankica the whore", referring to the death of Slavko Ćuruvija, another prominent investigative journalist who was assassinated in 1999. Belgrade's appellate court sentenced three hooligans to suspended sentences of 10 to 12 months in October 2013 for making death treats to Stanković. Miloš Radosavljević Kimi, the leader of the "Alkatraz" hooligan group was separately sentenced to 16 months in prison in 2010.

In 2013, B92 published Stanković's autobiographic book titled "Insajder: My Story". (Serbian: "Insajder, moja priča"). In 2014, she was awarded the Courage in Journalism Award given by International Women's Media Foundation (IWMF).

== Insajder.net ==
In 2016, Stanković quit job at B92 in order to launch her own news production company and investigative internet portal Insajder.net. Her company continued producing the "Insajder" programme for B92 television (renamed "O2 television" in 2017). Insajder.net also produces several other TV programmes ("Insajder debata", "Insajder bez ograničenja") broadcast in syndication by N1 television and TV Prva.
