= Milan Stanimirović =

Serbian politician

Milan Stanimirović (Serbian Cyrillic: Милан Станимировић; born 10 May 1960) is a politician in Serbia. He served in the National Assembly of Serbia for most of the period from 2001 to 2012 as a member of the Democratic Party (Demokratska stranka, DS) and has also served two terms as mayor of Vrbas. Stanimirović is now a member of the Social Democratic Party (Socijaldemokratska stranka, SDS).

== Early life and private career ==
Stanimirović was born in Vrbas, Autonomous Province of Vojvodina, in what was then the People's Republic of Serbia in the Federal People's Republic of Yugoslavia. He has been a journalist since age seventeen and began a long-standing relationship with the public radio outlet Vrbas and the affiliated journal Glas in 1987. He has also been an associate professor at the University of Belgrade Faculty of Political Sciences, specializing in international relations.

== Political career ==
=== First term as mayor ===
Stanimirović joined the DS in 1996 and was elected to his first of several terms in the Vrbas municipal assembly in that year's local elections. He was re-elected in the 2000 local elections, was deputy mayor from 2000 to 2002, and served his first term as mayor from 2002 to 2004. In January 2004, he hosted a seminar in Vrbas entitled, "The Role of the Media in Improving Ethnic Relations." He also became a member of DS's party's main board and Vojvodina provincial committee in 2000.

He was the DS's candidate for mayor of Vrbas in the 2004 local election and was defeated.

=== Member of the National Assembly ===
The DS contested the 2000 Serbian parliamentary election as part of a broad coalition called the Democratic Opposition of Serbia (DOS), which won a landslide majority with 176 out of 250 seats. Stanimirović received the 175th position on its electoral list and was subsequently awarded a mandate, taking his seat when the assembly met in early 2001. (From 2000 to 2011, parliamentary mandates were awarded to sponsoring parties or coalitions rather than to individual candidates, and the mandates were often distributed out of numerical order. Stanimirović did not automatically receive a seat by virtue of his list position, but he was included in the DOS's assembly delegation all the same.) He was a supporter of the Zoran Đinđić and Zoran Živković administrations in the parliament that followed.

The DOS was officially dissolved in November 2003, and the DS contested the 2003 Serbian parliamentary election at the head of its own electoral alliance. Stanimirović received the 156th position on the DS-led list, which won thirty-seven seats. He was not initially selected for the party's delegation but was awarded a mandate on 17 February 2004 as the replacement for another member who had resigned. The DS served in opposition to a government led by Vojislav Koštunica's Democratic Party of Serbia (Demokratska stranka Srbije, DSS) in this sitting of parliament. In August 2004, Stanimirović said that his party would support the government's amendments to Serbia's law on broadcasting; he noted that the DS was not fully satisfied with the changes but that new legislation was needed to bring some order to the chaotic sector.

Stanimirović was again included on the DS's list for the 2007 parliamentary election, was again not selected for its initial assembly delegation, and was again awarded a mandate as the replacement for another member on 8 June 2007. The DS won sixty-four seats and formed an unstable coalition government with the DSS after the election; the coalition dissolved in early 2008, and a new election was called for May of that year.

The DS contested the 2008 election at the head of an alliance called For a European Serbia, which won 102 seats. The overall results were initially inconclusive, but For a European Serbia eventually formed a new coalition government with the Socialist Party of Serbia. Stanimirović was included on the alliance list, was not included in his party's initial delegation, and for the third consecutive parliament was selected as a replacement member on 16 July 2008. He served as a supporter of the administration for the next four years.

Serbia's electoral system was reformed in 2011, such that parliamentary mandates were awarded in numerical order to candidates on successful lists. Stanimirović received the 103rd position on the DS's Choice for a Better Life list in the 2012 parliamentary election; the list won sixty-seven mandates, and he was not returned.

=== Since 2012 ===
Stanimirović was selected as mayor of Vrbas by a vote of the municipal assembly in December 2012, replacing Željko Vidović, who resigned because he could not hold a dual mandate as mayor and a member of the Assembly of Vojvodina. Stanimirović held the position until new elections were called in 2013.

The Democratic Party experienced a serious split in early 2014, with Boris Tadić setting up a breakaway group initially called the New Democratic Party. This group contested the 2014 election in a fusion with the Greens of Serbia and in alliance with other parties. Stanimirović sided with Tadić in the split and was given the thirty-fourth position on the alliance's electoral list; the list won eighteen mandates and he was again not returned. The New Democratic Party was reconstituted as the SDS later in the year.

Stanimirović criticized Vrbas's decision to dissolve its public media agency in 2015, noting that the decision left the community without local television, radio, or newspaper outlets.

For the 2016 parliamentary election, the SDS ran in an alliance with the Liberal Democratic Party and the League of Social Democrats of Vojvodina. Stanimirović received the twentieth position on their combined list and was again not returned when it won thirteen mandates.
