= Goran Matić =

Serbian journalist and politician

Goran Matić (Serbian Cyrillic: Горан Матић; born 6 June 1959) is a Serbian former journalist and politician. He was successively the secretary for information, a minister without portfolio, and the minister for information in the Federal Republic of Yugoslavia between 1997 and 2000 and later served in the Yugoslavian parliament. Matić was a member of the Yugoslav Left (JUL) and was at one time the party's vice president.

During his time in government, Matić was known for his vehement criticism of the North Atlantic Treaty Organization (NATO) and his accusations that western powers, particularly the United States of America and Germany, were seeking to destabilize Yugoslavia.

== Early life and career ==
Matić was born in Sremska Mitrovica, in what was then the Autonomous Province of Vojvodina in the People's Republic of Serbia, Federal People's Republic of Yugoslavia. He worked at the local radio station M, where he became editor-in-chief.

== Politician ==
During the 1980s, Matić led the municipal League of Socialist Youth in Sremska Mitrovica; he was also active with the league at the provincial level in Vojvodina and served on its presidency at the federal level in the Socialist Federal Republic of Yugoslavia. He later joined the Yugoslav Left, becoming a party spokesperson in 1996 and serving as a member of the party's directorate. He represented the JUL at a rally in Brčko for the 1996 Bosnian general election. In March 1997, he spoke against an over-reliance on privatization in modernizing the Yugoslavian economy.

=== Secretary for Information (1997–99) ===
On 27 March 1997, Matić was appointed as secretary for information in the Yugoslavian federal government. At the time, the Yugoslav Left was a junior partner in a coalition government led by the Socialist Party of Serbia (SPS) and the Democratic Party of Socialists of Montenegro (DPS), and Serbian political life generally was dominated by the authoritarian rule of Socialist Party leader Slobodan Milošević.

Soon after his appointment, Matić announced that Yugoslavia was preparing a new law on information. In so doing, he criticized the standard categorization of the country's media outlets as either "pro-government" or "independent," saying that Yugoslavia had no genuinely "independent" media outlets insofar all as they represented the views of their owners and founders. He added, "the emphasis in the media should be on truth and objectivity, not on dependence and independence." He also criticized opposition municipal governments for permitting broadcasts by international outlets such as Deutsche Welle and Radio Free Europe, which he described as being "under the direct control of the state bodies of Germany and the United States." During this period, Matić promoted the idea of a journalistic code of ethics, in which every Yugoslavian media outlet would be required to formulate and publish its own journalistic guidelines, so that the public would be able to see if its rules were being followed and if its "informational activity" was socially valuable.

Matić announced in May 1997 that the federal government planned to set up a "Yugoslav Radio-TV" (RTJ) network, on the grounds that it was not proper for Yugoslavia to be the only federal state in Europe without its own public television. In a follow-up speech, he advocated for strengthening the idea of Yugoslavism with the aim of integrating the federation into international frameworks as quickly as possible; in the same speech, he criticized journalists who abandoned "real facts" in favour of "imagination, fabrications and hoaxes," citing a recent headline story in the Dnevni telegraf that he said "demonized" Serbs as a people. Matić later said that the main purpose of RTJ would be to ensure that the Yugoslavian parliament and government could communicate with the public and convey information on vital and essential matters to all citizens.

Matić argued, early in his tenure as information secretary, that the large number of Albanian language newspapers in Kosovo was proof that Albanians in Yugoslavia had autonomy in information. In an interview with Radio Priština in early 1998, he said that Albanians, like all other citizens of Yugoslavia, had the right to express their views and opinions, with the exception of calling for violence or the breakdown of constitutional order; he added that some existing Albanian language papers advocated terrorism and serious violations of human rights and freedoms. He criticized Serbia's opposition media more generally in a February 1998 interview with Borba, saying that several outlets that "do not recognize basic professional standards" had been established "as an extension of certain political circles from home and abroad" with the intent of defaming Serbia and Yugoslavia in global public opinion.

In the early period of the Kosovo War in 1998, Matić contended that international media outlets such as CNN, the British Broadcasting Corporation (BBC), Voice of America, and Deutsche Welle were systemically reporting on events in Kosovo in a distorted manner to defame Serbia and Yugoslavia, adding that rebroadcasting the views of Voice of America radio in Serbia amounted in his view to a form of "direct subversion and fifth columnism." Referring to the Kosovo conflict more broadly, he said that the Albanian leadership was comprised "not [of] authentic representatives of that nationality in Kosovo and Metohija, but rather of certain interest circles outside Kosovo" and that its members were "instruments for implementing the policy of destroying the Federal Republic of Yugoslavia." He invited international journalists to report on events in Kosovo several times throughout 1998, saying that neither he nor Serbia had anything to hide.

Matić was appointed as president of the administrative board of the Tanjug news service in June 1998; not long thereafter, he announced that Tanjug would begin presenting information on the internet. The following month, he was appointed to the board of directors of the University of Belgrade and, separately, was re-elected as a member of the JUL directorate.

Throughout 1998, several previously unlicensed radio and television stations in Yugoslavia were given official certification. Matić noted at the end of the year that more than four hundred stations had been legalized in this way, pointing to this as evidence of media freedom in the country.

Matić said in late 1998 that Germany was "supporting terrorists and threatening military intervention" in Kosovo with the intent of creating an international protectorate in the province, and with longer-term plans of enacting a similar destabilization plan in Vojvodina.

=== Minister without portfolio (1999) ===
On 13 January 1999, Matić was appointed as a minister without portfolio in Yugoslavia's government. Prior to the NATO bombing of Yugoslavia, he charged that international media forces were creating a false narrative of events in Kosovo and "building a trend towards military intervention."

During the NATO bombing campaign, Matić defended Yugoslavia as a multi-ethnic state and said that the ethnic cleansing of Serbs, Albanians, and other communities in Kosovo was being carried out by NATO's war machinery. In May 1999, he sent a public letter to several international media organizations, criticizing them for not condemning attacks on journalists in Yugoslavia. On a number of occasions, he accused NATO of deliberately targeting civilians with the intent of creating mass panic.

Shortly after the end of the conflict, Matić inaugurated Tanjug's renovated International Press Centre in Belgrade. He said that Tanjug had an important role to play in countering propaganda against Yugoslavia and exposing what he described as the crimes of NATO.

=== Minister of Information (1999–2000) ===
Yugoslavia's government was restructured on 12 August 1999, and Matić was appointed to the newly created position of minister of information. His duties were not substantively different from before. Shortly after his appointment, he announced that Tanjug was expanding its operations, describing the media service "the pillar" of Yugoslavia's "information defence." In an interview with Radio Belgrade in early September 1999, he said that the NATO countries were continuing their "extended aggression" on Yugoslavia through media campaigns and by sponsoring some opposition groups in the country. He later described the opposition Alliance for Change as a "NATO gendarme."

In late October 1999, Matić accused Republika Srpska prime minister Milorad Dodik (who was at the time considered a western ally) of attempting to destabilize Yugoslavia through the introduction of counterfeit currency. He later accused International Federation of Journalists leader Aiden White of demonizing Yugoslavia, ignoring crimes committed against Serbs in Kosovo, and attempting to utilize Serbia's "independent" media in a broader destabilization campaign.

Matić described the assassination of Boško Perošević on 13 May 2000 as terrorist act with "a deep ideological and political background" and "the aim of further destabilizing Yugoslavia from the outside." In the same period, he accused the opposition Serbian Renewal Movement (SPO) of trying to take power in Serbia through "political terror."

In late May 2000, Matić was elected as president of the Yugoslav Left's city board for Novi Sad.

Matić sent a public letter to the ambassadors of the member states of the United Nations Security Council in early June 2000, expressing his "astonishment" at International Criminal Tribunal for the former Yugoslavia (ICTY) prosecutor Carla Del Ponte's statement that NATO neither intentionally targeted civilians nor committed war crimes in the previous year's bombing campaign. He said that the ICTY, thorough Del Ponte's statement, had "definitely sided with the aggressor and become an accomplice in NATO's crimes in Yugoslavia." In the same period, Matić accused the CIA of sponsoring the assassination of Montenegrin politician Goran Žugić so as to remove any possible impediment to Vukašin Maraš being able to dominate Montenegrin politics through his control over Milo Đukanović. This was a contentious claim even by Matić's usual standards; an article in the newspaper Vreme described Matić's comments as "ridiculous."

On 23 June 2000, the editors of Serbia's largest private and independent media outlets condemned Matić's recent statement that they were "directly connected to the American intelligence service, the CIA, and that they work on its orders"." NIN journalist Ljiljana Smajlović, whom Matić had specifically targeted in his remarks, announced that she would take legal action against him. A few days thereafter, NIN editor-in-chief Stevan Nikšić announced that the paper would also bring a defamation lawsuit against Matić.

Matić wrote a public letter to the director of the South Slavic Languages Program on Radio Free Europe in July 2000. He again described the station as a vehicle for American propaganda and said that, in light of what he described as the American government's "constant efforts to threaten the territorial integrity and constitutional order in our country and forcibly overthrow its elected government and establish a puppet government," there was no basis for Radio Free Europe to be registered in Yugoslavia.

Democratic Opposition of Serbia (DOS) candidate Vojislav Koštunica defeated Slobodan Milošević in the 2000 Yugoslavian presidential election, and Milošević fell from power on 5 October 2000, a watershed moment in Serbian and Yugoslavian politics. A new federal administration came to power on 4 November 2000, bringing Matić's ministerial term to an end.

=== Yugoslavian parliamentarian (2000–03) ===
The Yugoslav Left contested the 2000 Yugoslavian parliamentary election (which took place concurrently with the presidential vote) in an alliance with Socialist Party of Serbia. Matić led the alliance's electoral list for the Chamber of Citizens in the New Belgrade constituency and was elected when it won a single mandate. (For this election, half of the assembly mandates were assigned to candidates on successful lists in numerical order, with the other half assigned to other candidates at the discretion of the sponsoring parties or coalitions. Due to rounding, Matić was automatically elected.) The Democratic Opposition of Serbia won the election and subsequently formed a coalition government with the Socialist People's Party of Montenegro (SNP CG), while the SPS and JUL served in opposition. No longer in a position of power, Matić assumed a much lower public profile than before.

In May 2001, Matić said that the Yugoslav Left would soon have a "serious debate" about high-ranking party officials who had enriched themselves in public life. He noted there were "many members of the Main Board who used their time in politics to improve their financial situation, and who compromised the JUL and left it in the situation it is in."

Matić was elected as vice president of the Yugoslav Left in April 2002. The following month, he said that the party's parliamentarians would not take part in the work of drafting a new federal constitutional charter, on the grounds that the party did not want to give legitimation to the breakup of Yugoslavia. By this time, the JUL was increasingly becoming a marginal force in Serbian and Yugoslavian politics.

The Federal Republic of Yugoslavia was restructured as the State Union of Serbia and Montenegro in early 2003. The Chamber of Citizens ceased to exist, and Matić's parliamentary term came to an end. He retired from public life at this time and became active in consulting work.
