= Vladimir Orlić =

Serbian politician

- Владимир Орлић
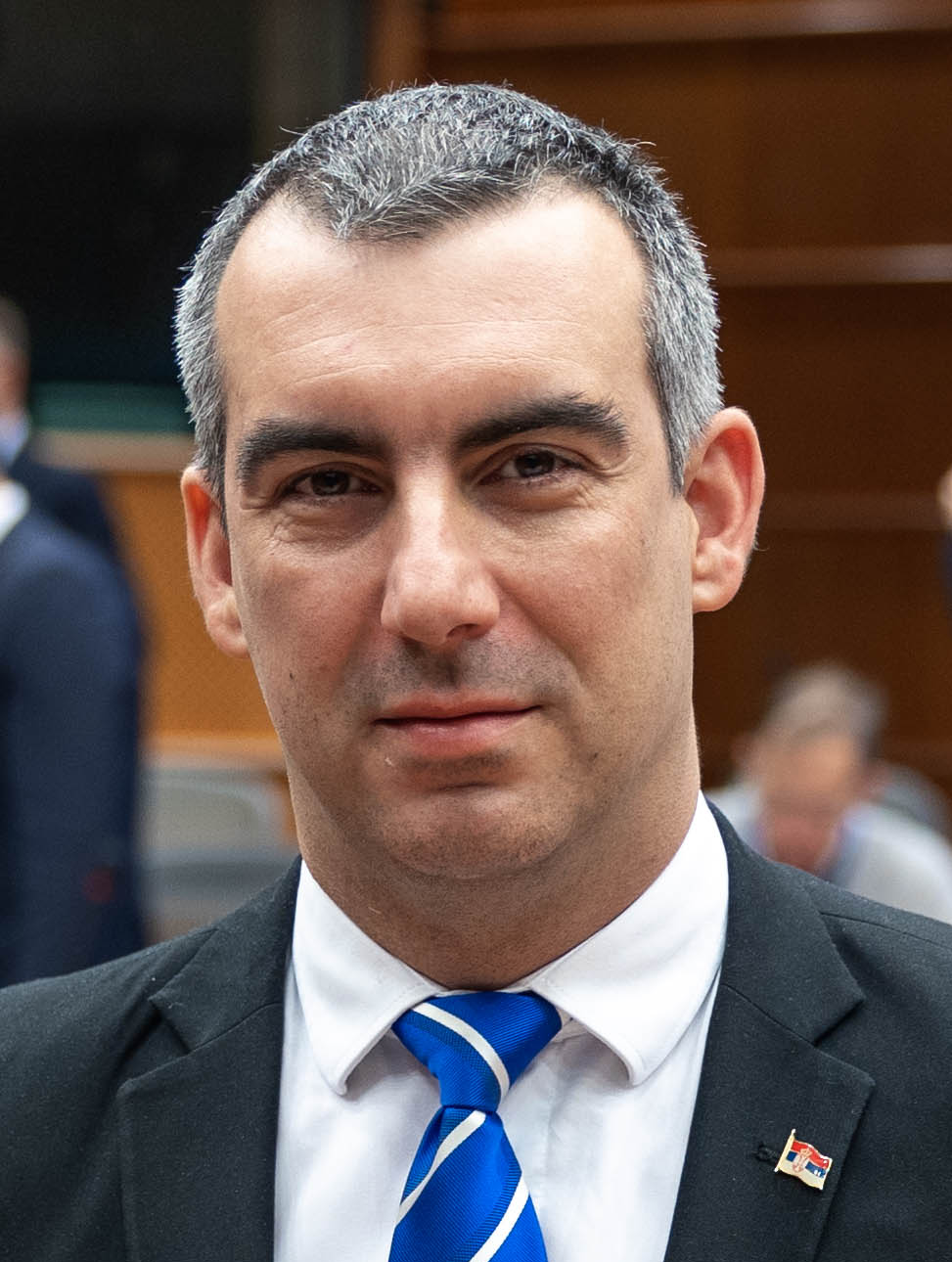
- Orlić in 2023

Director of the Security Intelligence Agency
- Incumbent
- Assumed office 12 June 2024
- Preceded by: Tomislav Radovanović (acting); Aleksandar Vulin

President of the National Assembly of Serbia
- In office 2 August 2022 – 6 February 2024
- Preceded by: Vladeta Janković (acting); Ivica Dačić
- Succeeded by: Stojan Radenović (acting); Ana Brnabić

Vice-President of the National Assembly of Serbia
- In office 22 October 2020 – 1 August 2022

Member of the National Assembly of Serbia
- In office 16 April 2014 – 13 June 2024

Member of the City Assembly of Belgrade
- In office 8 September 2016 – 11 June 2022

Personal details
- Born: 15 April 1983 (age 43) Belgrade, SR Serbia, SFR Yugoslavia
- Party: SNS (2008–present)
- Children: 3
- Education: University of Belgrade

Vladimir Orlić (Serbian Cyrillic: Владимир Орлић; born 15 April 1983) is a Serbian politician and administrator. He served five terms in Serbia's national assembly between 2014 and 2024 and was its president from August 2022 to February 2024. Since 12 June 2024, he has been the director of Serbia's Security Intelligence Agency (BIA).

He is a member of the Serbian Progressive Party (SNS) and has been one of its vice-presidents since 2021. Orlić is known for insulting political opponents and his harsh rhetoric.

== Early life and career ==
Orlić was born in Belgrade, in what was then the Socialist Republic of Serbia in the Socialist Federal Republic of Yugoslavia. He graduated from the University of Belgrade School of Electrical Engineering in 2007 and received a Ph.D. in electrical engineering and computing from the same institution in 2011. He has published over eighty scientific and professional papers. Orlić has worked in research and development for Imtel, and in 2012 he began working at the Vlatacom Research and Development Institute.

== Political career ==
Orlić joined the Progressive Party on its formation in 2008 and became a member of its presidency in 2017. He was elected as one of its vice-presidents in November 2021.

=== City politics in Belgrade ===
Orlić appeared in the fifty-ninth position on the Progressive Party's electoral list for the Belgrade city assembly in the 2012 local elections. The list won thirty-seven seats, and he was not elected.

He was given the seventy-fourth position on the SNS list in the 2014 Belgrade city election. The Progressives and their allies won a majority victory with sixty-three out of 110 seats; Orlić was not initially elected but received a mandate on 8 September 2016 as the replacement for another SNS representative. He was promoted to the thirtieth position on the party's list in the 2018 city election and was re-elected when the Progressives and their allies won a second consecutive majority victory with sixty-four seats. He was not a candidate in the 2022 city election, and his term in the city assembly ended in that year.

Orlić also received the fifth position on the Progressive Party's list for the Čukarica municipal assembly in the 2016 Serbian municipal elections and was elected when the list won twenty-one seats. He resigned his seat on 3 June 2016.

=== Parliamentarian ===
==== First three terms (2014–22) ====
Orlić received the eighty-third position on the Progressive Party's Future We Believe In list for the 2014 parliamentary election and was elected when the list won a landslide victory with 158 out of 250 mandates. In his first term, he was a member of the assembly's spatial planning committee (Note: Formally known as the Committee on Spatial Planning, Transport, Infrastructure, and Telecommunications.) and education committee, (Note: Formally known as the Committee on Education, Science, Technological Development, and the Information Society.) a deputy member of the European integration committee, the head of Serbia's parliamentary friendship group with Argentina, and a member of the friendship groups with the Arab Gulf States, South Africa, and the countries of Sub-Saharan Africa.

Orlić was promoted to the forty-fourth position on the SNS list for the 2016 parliamentary election and was re-elected when the party and its allies won a second consecutive majority with 131 seats. In the term that followed, he was deputy leader of the SNS parliamentary group, served once again on the spatial planning and education committees, chaired the European Union–Serbia stabilization and association committee, was a member of Serbia's delegation to the Parliamentary Assembly of the Organization for Security and Co-operation in Europe (OSCE PA), led Serbia's parliamentary friendship groups with Argentina, North Korea, and South Africa, and was a member of the friendship groups with China, Egypt, Ghana, Indonesia, Israel, Russia, the countries of Sub-Saharan Africa, and the United States of America.

He received the thirty-first position on the Progressive Party's list in the 2020 Serbian parliamentary election and was elected to a third term when the list won a landslide majority with 188 mandates. There were rumours that he would become president of the assembly after the election, but Ivica Dačić was chosen instead for the role and Orlić became one of its vice-presidents. He continued to chair the stabilization and association committee and was a member of the committee on the rights of the child.

==== Speaker of the assembly (2022–24) ====
Orlić received the twenty-third position on the Progressive Party's list in the 2022 parliamentary election and was re-elected when the list won 120 seats, falling below majority status but remaining the dominant presence in the assembly. He was elected president of the assembly in August 2022, succeeding Dačić. The choice of Orlić was controversial; the assembly president's role is meant to be non-partisan, and Orlić had by this time cultivated a reputation for harsh insults directed toward the SNS's rivals. During the debate on his candidacy, Party of Freedom and Justice (SSP) assembly leader Marinika Tepić described him as "a symbol of the erosion of parliamentarism" in Serbia under the SNS. An article in the journal NIN later alleged that Orlić oversaw the house in a biased manner, "turn[ing] off microphones, [...] respond[ing] with insults to criticism," and making frequent use of procedural mechanisms against the opposition.

Orlić also chaired the committee on the rights of the child during the 2022–24 term and led Serbia's delegations to the South-East European Cooperation Process (SEECP) parliamentary assembly and the Inter-Parliamentary Union (IPU) assembly.

==== Fifth term (2024) ====
Orlić was promoted to the fifth position on the SNS's list for the 2023 parliamentary election and was re-elected when the list returned to majority status with 129 seats. His term as assembly president ended on 6 February 2024, when the fourteenth convocation began. Stojan Radenović, as the oldest member of the assembly, became acting president, and Ana Brnabić was later chosen for the role on a full-time basis.

In a March 2024 interview about the composition of Serbia's next government, SNS president Miloš Vučević said, "I think Orlić is definitely part of the future cabinet, we'll see in what position." When Serbia's new ministry was announced on 30 April 2024, however, Orlić's name was not included.

Orlić led the SNS alliance's list for Čukarica in the 2024 Serbian local elections and was re-elected to the municipal assembly when the list won a majority victory with twenty-six out of forty-five seats. He resigned from the local assembly on 10 July 2024, the day it convened.

== BIA Director ==
On 12 June 2024, Orlić was appointed as director of Serbia's Security Intelligence Agency (BIA). As with his appointment as national assembly president two years earlier, this decision was met with criticism in some circles. An article in NIN described his appointment as consistent with a broader pattern of the SNS asserting party control over state security mechanisms. He resigned from the national assembly on the day after his appointment.

Orlić has faced criticism over the BIA's alleged misuse of digital monitoring technologies against activists and journalists. Separately, Democratic Party (DS) leader Srđan Milivojević filed criminal charges against Orlić in March 2026, alleging that he exerted illegal pressure in the election for members of the High Council of Prosecutors.

== Personal life ==
Orlić is married and has three daughters. He resides in Belgrade.

He writes poetry and has published a poetry collection titled Jabah.

== Notes ==
Political offices
Preceded by Ivica Dačić	President of the National Assembly of Serbia; 2022–2024	Succeeded by Ana Brnabić
