= Mrdić's Laws =

Amendments to judicial laws in Serbia

National Assembly of Serbia
- Long title: (1) Law on Amendments to the Law on the High Council of Prosecutions (2) Law on Amendments to the Law on Seats and Areas of Courts and Public Prosecutor's Offices (3) Law on Amendments to the Law on the Organisation and Competencies of State Authorities to Fight High-Tech Crime (4) Law on Amendments to the Law on Public Prosecutions (5) Law on Amendments to the Law on Judges
- Passed by: National Assembly of Serbia
- Passed: 28 January 2026
- Enacted: 9 February 2026
- Signed by: Aleksandar Vučić
- Signed: 30 January 2026
- Introduced by: Uglješa Mrdić
- Introduced: 22 December 2025

Mrdić's Laws (Serbian: Мрдићеви закони, Mrdićevi zakoni) are a collection of amendments to judicial laws in Serbia. They are named after their sponsor Uglješa Mrdić, a member of the National Assembly of Serbia affiliated with the Serbian Progressive Party. Before the laws were submitted, the Public Prosecutor's Office for Organised Crime (TOK) launched investigations into several former ministers of the government of Serbia. Mrdić's Laws target the Law on the High Council of Prosecutions, Law on Seats and Areas of Courts and Public Prosecutor's Offices, Law on the Organisation and Competencies of State Authorities to Fight High-Tech Crime, Law on Public Prosecutions, and Law on Judges. The most prominent changes to these laws include the reorganisation of the TOK and Prosecutor's Office for High-Tech Crime to be subordinate to the Higher Public Prosecutor's Office in Belgrade, which is headed by Nenad Stefanović, an Aleksandar Vučić loyalist, and the creation of the Fourth Basic Court in Belgrade.

Submitted to the National Assembly on 22 December 2025, the laws were adopted on 28 January 2026 by a majority of MPs. Vučić signed the laws on 30 January and they went into effect on 9 February. Those supportive of the changes say that the laws would improve the judiciary's efficiency. Mrdić's Laws received criticism from the TOK, High Council of the Judiciary, High Council of the Prosecutor's Office, Republic Prosecutor's Office, European Union, political opposition, non-governmental organisations, and judicial experts. Critics said that the laws do not meet international standards, that they abandon the principles of the European Union and the process of the accession of Serbia to the European Union, or that the judiciary would be put under the control of the government. Government officials have disputed some of these claims. Lack of public discussion regarding the proposals was also criticised. In response to this, the government sought an opinion from the Venice Commission, sending its proposed changes to the advisory body. It published some proposals in April and discussed the changes in detail in June, announcing that the government of Serbia adopted seven out of nine proposals it recommended. In June, the National Assembly voted in favour of amendments to Mrdić's Laws.

== Background ==
Uglješa Mrdić is a member of the National Assembly of Serbia affiliated with the Serbian Progressive Party (SNS). He is the president of the Judiciary Committee in the National Assembly. On 31 October 2025, he began a hunger strike in front of the National Assembly, demanding that Nebojša Bojović and Milutin Milošević, officials formerly associated with the Serbian Railways Infrastructure company, be jailed. He also said that Zagorka Dolovac, the Supreme Public Prosecutor, was allegedly defending them and that a colour revolution was underway. Aleksandar Vučić, the president of Serbia, demanded that he end the hunger strike on 8 November. Mrdić ended the hunger strike on 10 November.

After the hunger strike, Mrdić continued to criticise the Serbian judiciary, alleging that the Supreme Public Prosecutor's Office did not work "in favour of Serbian interests". He sued several prosecutors, including Dolovac, whose removal he also called for. He also said that he would introduce several amendments to judicial laws in the National Assembly, stating that "we must have a judiciary and prosecutor's office that works in the interest of the state" (moramo imati sudstvo i tužilaštvo koje radi u interesu države). Mrdić's suggestions received support from Nenad Vujić, the minister of justice, and Constitutional Court judge Vladan Petrov, while the Supreme Public Prosecutor's Office objected to the proposals.

The Public Prosecutor's Office for Organised Crime (TOK) had previously launched an investigation into the Novi Sad railway station canopy collapse and Trump Tower Belgrade (General Staff Building) in 2024 and 2025, respectively. In the aftermath of the canopy collapse, the TOK indicted former ministers Tomislav Momirović and Goran Vesić. The government had introduced a lex specialis regarding the General Staff Building, which removed the building's status as cultural heritage, and Jared Kushner's company was supposed to build Trump Tower Belgrade on the building's property. However, on 15 December 2025, the TOK filed an indictment against minister Nikola Selaković, stating that he abused his public position and falsified documents related to the lex specialis. Selaković denied the accusations, saying that the General Staff Building never had the status of cultural heritage. In response to the indictment, Kushner's company announced that it abandoned the Trump Tower Belgrade project.

== Content ==
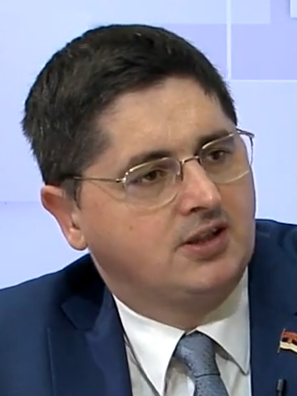
Uglješa Mrdić, the proposer of the changes

Mrdić's proposed amendments to the Law on the High Council of Prosecutions, Law on Seats and Areas of Courts and Public Prosecutor's Offices, Law on the Organisation and Competencies of State Authorities to Fight High-Tech Crime, Law on Public Prosecutions, and Law on Judges. Mrdić's proposals would make the TOK and Public Prosecutor's Office for War Crimes subordinate to the Higher Public Prosecutor's Office in Belgrade, which is headed by Nenad Stefanović, and create the Fourth Basic Court in Belgrade that would be in charge of cases related to Expo 2027.

Changes to the Law on Public Prosecutions include the return of the institution of referral of public prosecutors from lower to higher public prosecutor's offices, while the Supreme Public Prosecutor's Office would be deprived of the right to decide on the referral, with the High Council of Prosecutions would be in charge of that instead. Additionally, a public prosecutor may be referred to another public prosecutor's office of any level for a maximum of three years. The amendment also states that the Supreme Public Prosecutor would be elected every six years. Their right of discretionary authority to decide who will be the head of the Special Department for the Fight Against High-Tech Crime would also be stripped.

Regarding the Law on Judges, there is only a single amendment, regarding the re-election of court presidents for another five-year terms.

== Vote ==
=== First vote ===
Mrdić submitted the proposals to the National Assembly on 22 December 2025. An amendment to Mrdić's proposals to the Law on Public Prosecutions was submitted by Olja Petrović, also a member of the SNS, on 13 January 2026. Mrdić's proposals came to be known as Mrdić's Laws in the media. The journalist Vuk Jeremić of Insajder reported that some part of the public thought that the proposals would be withdrawn from the procedure due to their negative reception. However, on 28 January, the National Assembly voted in favour of the proposals. The proposals were voted on under "urgent procedure" (hitna procedura) and without public discussion. A majority of MPs voted in favour of the laws. All of the amendments proposed by opposition parliamentary groups were rejected. President Vučić signed Mrdić's Laws two days later. They went into effect on 9 February.

Law on Amendments to the Law on the High Council of Prosecutions
| Ballot → | 28 January 2026 |
| Required majority → | 126 out of 250 |
| Yes | 138 / 250 |
| No | 36 / 250 |
| Abstentions | 0 / 250 |
| Absentees | 76 / 250 |
Source: Otvoreni Parlament

Law on Amendments to the Law on Seats and Areas of Courts and Public Prosecutor's Offices
| Ballot → | 28 January 2026 |
| Required majority → | 126 out of 250 |
| Yes | 136 / 250 |
| No | 32 / 250 |
| Abstentions | 0 / 250 |
| Absentees | 77 / 250 |
Source: Otvoreni Parlament

Law on Amendments to the Law on the Organisation and Competenceies of State Authorities to Fight High-Tech Crime
| Ballot → | 28 January 2026 |
| Required majority → | 126 out of 250 |
| Yes | 138 / 250 |
| No | 36 / 250 |
| Abstentions | 0 / 250 |
| Absentees | 74 / 250 |
Source: Otvoreni Parlament

Law on Amendments to the Law on Public Prosecutions
| Ballot → | 28 January 2026 |
| Required majority → | 126 out of 250 |
| Yes | 138 / 250 |
| No | 38 / 250 |
| Abstentions | 0 / 250 |
| Absentees | 73 / 250 |
Source: Otvoreni Parlament

Law on Amendments to the Law on Judges
| Ballot → | 28 January 2026 |
| Required majority → | 126 out of 250 |
| Yes | 138 / 250 |
| No | 37 / 250 |
| Abstentions | 0 / 250 |
| Absentees | 73 / 250 |
Source: Otvoreni Parlament

=== Second vote ===
Changes to Mrdić's Laws were introduced to the National Assembly at its session that began on 17 June 2026. The changes were introduced after the recommendations by the Venice Commission. At the session, Mrdić said that the government did not withdraw the laws but improved them instead. The Ministry of Justice denied that there were any differences between the changes submitted to the Venice Commission and the National Assembly. On 25 June, the National Assembly voted in favour of the changes to Mrdić's Laws.

== Analysis ==
Mrdić said that his proposals would improve the independent status of the judiciary. The journalist Vuk Cvijić of the news magazine Radar noted that the changes to the Law on Public Prosecutions would mean that most important investigations done by the TOK would stop once the three-year term of prosecutors expires. He put the Jovanjica case, Darko Šarić case, and the Balkan Cartel case as examples of such investigations. The proposals would also mean that chief prosecutors and court presidents could operate under acting status. According to the TOK, Petrović's amendment would mean that cases related to organised crime and corruption could be undermined considering that most prosecutors under the TOK came from other prosecutor's offices. Jeremić also reported that the reorganisation of the Prosecutor's Office for High-Tech Crime under the Higher Public Prosecutor's Office in Belgrade could increase the number of criminal proceedings related to social media comments. The N1 television has reported that this is due to Nenad Stefanović's (the president of the Higher Public Prosecutor's Office in Belgrade) loyalist status towards Vučić.

== Reactions ==
=== Support ===
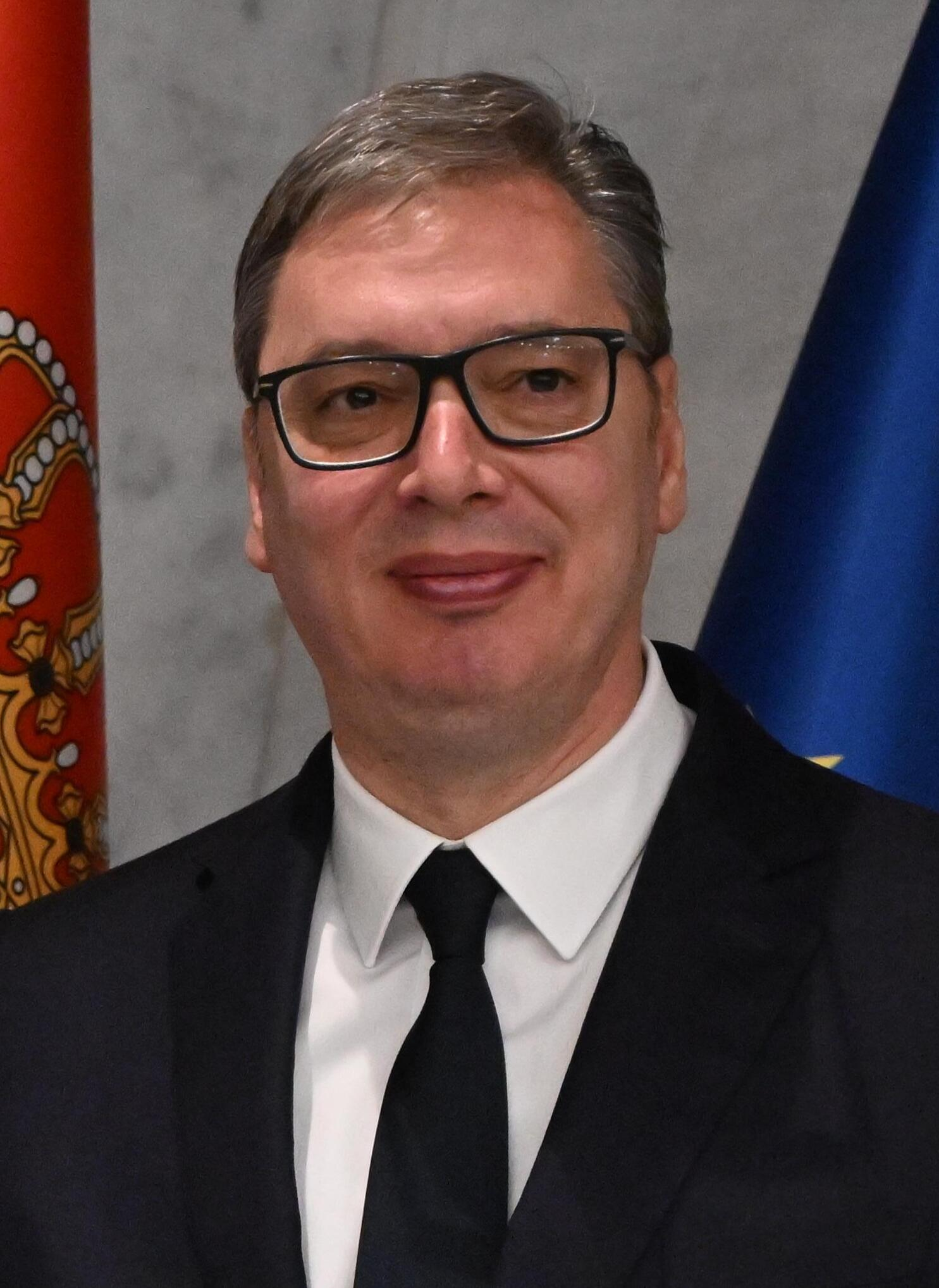
Aleksandar Vučić, the president of Serbia, expressed his support for the changes

Those supportive of Mrdić's Laws say that the efficiency of the judiciary would be increased and improved. Mrdić admitted that he proposed the changes due to the prosecution of SNS members. Milenko Jovanov, the president of the SNS parliamentary group, voiced his support for the proposals. (Note: The journalist Sandra Petrušić of Radar noted that despite his support of the changes, Jovanov had previously praised the Serbian judiciary and the government's work on making the judiciary more independent.) Vučić has also expressed his support for the changes, but has also criticised the SNS and Vujić for the lack of public discussion about the proposals. Elvira Kovács, a vice-president of the National Assembly of Serbia, stated that Mrdić's Laws would not go out of European Union's legal bounds. The Judiciary Committee in the National Assembly also expressed their support for the changes. Petrov, the president of the Constitutional Court, praised Mrdić's character, but only had concerns about Mrdić not asking for opinions from the High Council of the Judiciary and the High Council of the Prosecutor's Office. Nemanja Starović, the minister for European integration, says that with the adoption of the changes, Serbia did not end its process of the accession to the European Union.

=== Opposition ===
==== Experts ====
The TOK, High Council of the Judiciary, High Council of the Prosecutor's Office, Republic Prosecutor's Office, Association of Prosecutors of Serbia, and the Association of Judges of Serbia expressed their opposition to the changes. The Centre for Judicial Research (CEPRIS) also voiced opposition to the amendments, saying that they would strengthen the influence of the government over the judiciary. CEPRIS, alongside six other non-governmental organisations and a group of judges, sent an appeal to the UN Special Rapporteur on the Judiciary in January 2026. The rapporteur Margaret Satterthwaite responded in March, criticising the laws, saying that they do not meet international standards regarding the independence of judiciary.

Dolovac opposed the changes, criticising the lack of discussion and the abandonment of the principles of the European Union. Prosecutor Bojana Savović said that with the proposer ignoring public discussion, the government ignored the rule of law and opinions from judicial experts. She also criticised changes to the Prosecutor's Office for High-Tech Crime. Jasmina Paunović, a retired prosecutor, voiced her opposition to Mrdić's Laws, saying that the proposed changes would be a step backward for the judiciary as a whole. Radovan Lazić, a prosecutor from Novi Sad, and Katarina Golubović, the president of the Committee of Lawyers for Human Rights (YUCOM), also expressed their opposition, especially criticising lack of discussion. Vesna Rakić Vodinelić, a law professor, said that with the adoption of Mrdić's Laws, the Serbian government essentially ended the process of the accession of Serbia to the European Union. Jovana Spremo from the Committee of Lawyers for Human Rights said that the government's goal is to rein in the TOK, as well as abandoning accession to the European Union.

A number of lawyers attended a protest against the proposed changes on 7 December 2025. Several protests organised by lawyers, prosecutors, and judges were organised throughout February 2026, namely on 6, 9, 10, and 21 February.

==== European Union ====
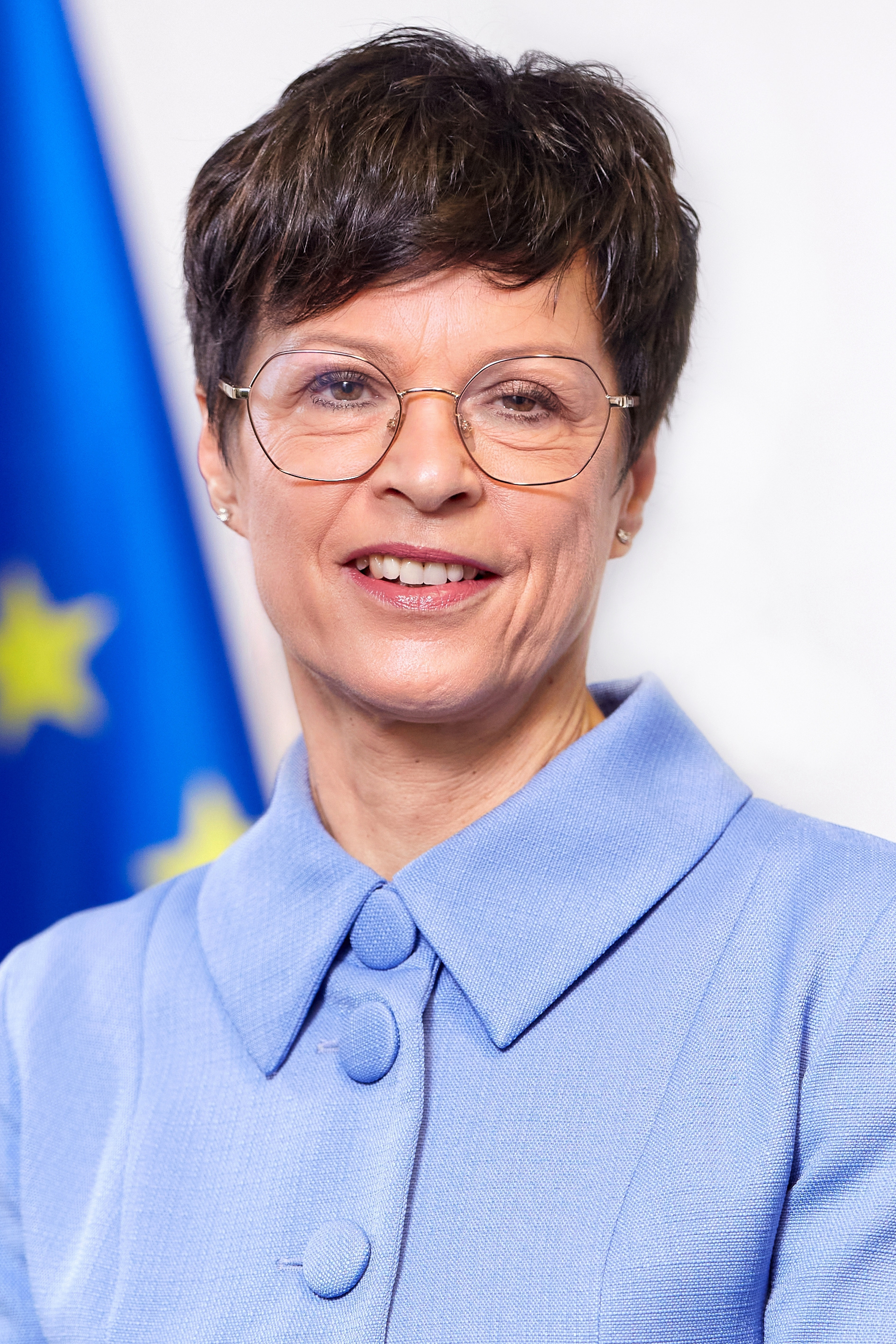
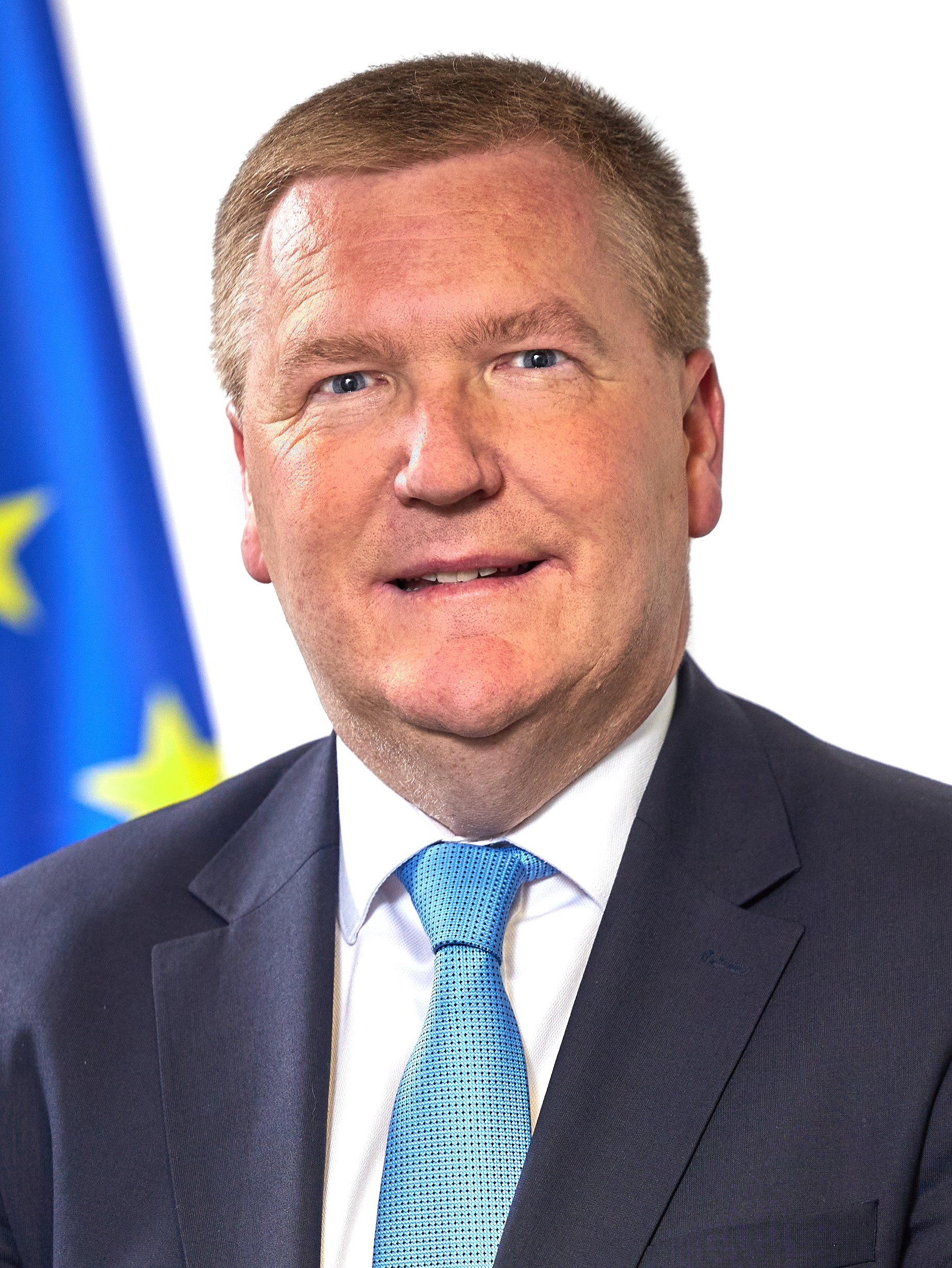
European Commissioners Marta Kos (left) and Michael McGrath (right) expressed their opposition to the changes

The European Union reacted negatively to the proposed laws. Marta Kos, the European Commissioner for Enlargement, said that the National Assembly should audit the adopted changes, saying that the changes put Serbia away from its accession to the European Union. A European Commission representative also said that the changes put Serbia "a step back" in regards to the accession to the European Union. The representative also said that the European Commission also hopes the laws would not be applied until the Venice Commission gives its opinion. The European Commission also issued a request to the government to reconsider the adopted changes. Michael McGrath, the European Commissioner for Justice, also expressed concerns about Mrdić's Laws, advising the government to suspend the changes to the laws. A delegation of the European Union in Serbia, led by Andreas von Bekerath, also expressed disagreement with the proposals. Sandro Gozi, a member of the European Parliament, said that the European Commission should also reconsider ending the discussions about the accession of Serbia to the European Union.

McGrath met with Vujić, the minister of justice of Serbia, in early February, where they discussed Mrdić's Laws. Vujić informed McGrath that the government was seeking an opinion from the Venice Commission, while the European Commission advised to suspend the changes. On 14 February, Vučić met with Kos, discussing Mrdić's Laws. A month later, Kos met with Brnabić.

Kos welcomed the 25 June vote in the National Assembly regarding Mrdić's Laws, while the European Commission announced that it was investigating whether the adopted changes were in line with the recommendations by the Venice Commission.

==== Political opposition ====
The political opposition reacted negatively to the proposals, saying that the judiciary would essentially be put under the control of the government, while also criticising lack of discussion. They say that the TOK, which is investigating several government officials, would be effectively dissolved and that the judiciary would lose its independence. Part of the opposition also said that the laws were essentially a coup d'état.

Pavle Grbović, the president of the Movement of Free Citizens (PSG) and a member of the Judiciary Committee in the National Assembly, said that the proposed amendments would establish "a more desired balance of power" (poželjniji balans moći) in favour of the SNS government. Branko Pavlović from the We – Voice from the People and Branko Lukić from the We – Power of the People, both lawyers, also opposed the changes, stating their reasonings during a session in the National Assembly. Miloš Pavlović from the People's Movement of Serbia (NPS) also negatively reacted to the changes, saying that the government would then confront its judicial opponents, while also criticising lack of discussion. Savo Manojlović from the Kreni-Promeni said that Mrdić's Laws would lead Serbia into a dictatorship. Zdravko Ponoš, the president of the Serbia Centre, Marinika Tepić of the Party of Freedom and Justice, Radomir Lazović of the Green–Left Front (ZLF), and the Democratic Party also expressed their opposition to the changes.

The ZLF, PSG, NPS, and New Face of Serbia parliamentary groups in the National Assembly submitted a request to the Constitutional Court to assess the constitutionality of Mrdić's Laws in February 2026. The Constitutional Court began working on the case a month later.

== Aftermath ==
=== European Union funds ===
Radar notes that the European Union did not send funds to Serbia on 27 January, but did not specify whether it was because of Mrdić's Laws. Despite this, the European Commission said that the government should have held a transparent discussion with the European Commission and the Venice Commission. A European Commission representative also said that they expect Serbia to align their judicial standards with the European Union. On 13 February, Kos said that there is a possibility that the European Union could block €1.6 billion worth of funds to Serbia. The European Commission confirmed this in April.

=== Venice Commission response ===
In response to the negative reception, Brnabić announced that the government would seek an opinion from the Venice Commission. The Venice Commission responded by saying that it will discuss the changes during its session in June. In March, the representatives of the Venice Commission visited Serbia, discussing the laws with Brnabić, Vujić, MPs, various prosecutors, and non-governmental organisations. Shortly thereafter, the Venice Commission published a document in which the Serbian government explained the Mrdić's Laws in detail, while also sending it some of its own proposals. The High Council of the Prosecutor's Office declined to adopt the proposals.

The Ministry of Justice created a working group on 28 April to discuss the proposals sent by the Venice Commission. Its first meeting was held a day later, while its second one was held on 4 May. Mrdić was confirmed as one of its members on 5 May. The Ministry of Justice sent its "improved texts" of the changed laws to the Venice Commission, European Commission, and the European Union on 18 May. Insajder reported that the "improved texts" aligned more with the proposals of the Venice Commission.

On 12 and 13 June, the Venice Commission met to discuss Mrdić's Laws; Brnabić was present at the plenary session. After the first day, Brnabić said that the Venice Commission gave a positive response on the improved texts and that the National Assembly will vote on them again in the same month. Minister Vujić also said that Serbia fully adopted the commission's proposals. The Venice Commission responded by saying that the Serbian government adopted seven out of nine proposals that were recommended by them. The government did not apply changes regarding the TOK and Prosecutor's Office for High-Tech Crime.

== See also ==
- 2022 Serbian constitutional referendum
