= Jelena Pavlović =

Serbian politician

- Јелена Павловић

Member of the National Assembly of the Republic of Serbia
- In office 6 February 2024 – 17 November 2026

Member of the City Assembly of Belgrade
- Incumbent
- Assumed office 18 June 2024

Personal details
- Born: 1976 (age 49–50)
- Party: MI–GIN (2023–24); MI–SN (2024); Ind. (2024–present)

Jelena Pavlović (Serbian Cyrillic: Јелена Павловић; born 1976) is a Serbian politician. She has served in the Serbian parliament since February 2024 and has also been a member of Belgrade city assembly since June 2024. Previously a member of the We – Voice from the People (MI–GIN) and We – Power of the People (MI–SN) political movements, she is now an independent.

== Private career ==
Pavlović is a lawyer living in the Belgrade municipality of New Belgrade.

== Politician ==
Pavlović appeared in the fourth position on the We – Voice from the People electoral list in the 2023 Serbian parliamentary election and was elected when the list unexpectedly won thirteen mandates. She took her seat when the new assembly convened in February 2024. Shortly thereafter, the We movement split into two factions, with list holder Branimir Nestorović leaving to form a new group called We – Power of the People (MI–SN). Pavlović joined Nestorović's group. The Serbian Progressive Party (SNS) and its allies won the 2023 election, and both of the We factions served in opposition.

Pavlović later appeared in the fourth position on the MI–SN list in the 2024 Belgrade city assembly election and was elected when the list won ten seats. As at the republic level, the Progressives and their allies won the election, and the We delegates serve in opposition.

In September 2024, Pavlović complained that MI–SN leader Branimir Nestorović was creating a crisis in the movement by withholding the parliamentary group's budgetary funds. She said that the lack of funding was making it difficult for her to even call a press conference at Serbia's Media Centre.

Pavlović was expelled from MI–SN in December 2024. No official reason was given, although MI–SN issued a statement that Pavlović "knows more than she might like to reveal to the public" about recent hacking efforts on the movement's social media outlets. She, in turn, accused her former colleagues of having a "lack of courage and dignity in resolving problems transparently and constructively" and described the insinuations around hacking as "a shameful attempt to discredit my actions."

She is now an independent member of national assembly and does not serve with any parliamentary grouping. She was initially a member of the labour committee; (Note: Formally known as the Committee on Labour, Social Issues, Social Inclusion, and Poverty Reduction.) a deputy member of the education committee, (Note: Formally known as the Committee on Education, Science, Technological Development, and the Information Society.) the health and family committee, the administrative committee, (Note: Formally known as the Committee on Administrative, Budgetary, Mandate, and Immunity Issues.) and the committee on the rights of the child; and a member of the parliamentary friendship groups with Argentina, Armenia, Cuba, Italy and the Holy See, Japan, Malta, Portugal, Spain, and the United Arab Emirates. After leaving MI–SN, she lost her committee assignments.
