= Siniša Ljepojević =

Serbian politician

- Синиша Љепојевић

Member of the National Assembly of the Republic of Serbia
- Incumbent
- Assumed office 6 February 2024

Personal details
- Born: 1956 (age 69–70) Mrkonjić Grad, PR Bosnia and Herzegovina, FPR Yugoslavia
- Party: MI–GIN (2023–25); Ind. (since 2025)

Siniša Ljepojević (Serbian Cyrillic: Синиша Љепојевић; born 1956) is a Serbian journalist and politician. He has served in the Serbian parliament since 2024, initially as a member of the We – Voice from the People (MI–GIN) political organization and later as an independent.

== Private career ==
Ljepojević was born in Gerzovo in the Mrkonjić Grad municipality, in what was then the People's Republic of Bosnia and Herzegovina in Federal People's Republic of Yugoslavia. He was employed by the Tanjug news agency for several years as a journalist and correspondent based in London.

He has written several articles for Serbia's Novi Standard newspaper in recent years. Among other things, he has supported Brexit, defended Boris Johnson at the time of the 2019 United Kingdom general election as a champion of "the people" against "the elites," described the global response to the COVID-19 pandemic as "primarily a political project of the globalist elite" and an effort to destroy the independence of nation-states, referred to Elizabeth II as having been the last remaining symbol of Britain's lost greatness (while implying that she may have died from a COVID-19 booster short), described Serbia's acceptance of the 2023 Ohrid Agreement as capitulation to external powers and evidence of the country's political collapse, and castigated Keir Starmer's government for cutting benefits to the elderly while pledging military support for Ukraine.

Shortly before the Russian invasion of Ukraine in February 2022, Ljepojević said that the growing military tensions in Europe were due in large part to "Washington's efforts to re-colonize and control the European continent" and the crisis could be an impetus for the western powers to bring Bosnia and Herzegovina into the North Atlantic Treaty Organization (NATO) as a means of eliminating the influence of Russia and China in the country.

Ljepojević lives in the Belgrade municipality of Palilula.

== Politician ==
Ljepojević appeared in the second position on the We – Voice from the People electoral list in the 2023 Serbian parliamentary election and was elected when the list unexpectedly won thirteen mandates. He took his seat when the new assembly convened in February 2024. Shortly thereafter, the We movement split into two factions, with list holder Branimir Nestorović leaving to form a new group called We – Power of the People (MI–SN). Ljepojević initially remained with MI–GIN. He said that Nestorović had insisted on becoming president of the official "We" political party then being formed, a demand that was rejected by others in the movement.

The Serbian Progressive Party (SNS) and its allies won the 2023 election, and both of the We factions now serve in opposition. Ljepojević does not hold any committee responsibilities in parliament. He is a member of the parliamentary friendship group with Syria, which he joined prior to Bashar al-Assad's fall from power.

In May 2025, Ljepojević left MI–GIN and became an independent parliamentarian.
