= Aleksandar Pavić =

Serbian politician

- Александар Павић

Member of the National Assembly of the Republic of Serbia
- Incumbent
- Assumed office 6 February 2024

Member of the City Assembly of Belgrade
- Incumbent
- Assumed office 18 June 2024

Personal details
- Born: 11 November 1961 (age 64) Belgrade, PR Serbia, FPR Yugoslavia
- Party: SPO (1990–?); MI–GIN (2023–2024); MI–SN (2024–2026); Ind. (since March 2026)

Aleksandar Pavić (Serbian Cyrillic: Александар Павић; born 11 November 1961) is a Serbian writer and politician. He has served in the Serbian parliament since February 2024, originally as a member of the We – Voice from the People (MI–GIN) political movement, later with the breakaway We – Power of the People (MI–SN) movement, and since March 2026 as an independent. He has also been a member of the Belgrade city assembly since June 2024.

Pavić has a long history of involvement in Serbian nationalist causes and was an advisor to Republika Srpska president Biljana Plavšić in 1996–97.

== Early life and private career ==
Pavić was born in Belgrade, in what was then the People's Republic of Serbia in the Federal People's Republic of Yugoslavia. His biography indicates that he later moved with his family to the United States of America and completed elementary and secondary school in Chicago before earning a Bachelor of Arts degree in political science from the University of California, Berkeley (1985). He returned to Belgrade in 1990 with the end of one-party socialist rule in Yugoslavia and was active in the right-wing opposition to Slobodan Milošević's rule. He has been identified as a founder of the Belgrade committee of the Serbian Renewal Movement (SPO), at a time when that party was associated with a hardline nationalist ideology. In March 1991, in the early period of the Croatian War, Pavić reportedly travelled with Dragan Vasiljković to the territory of the SAO Krajina.

In July 1995, Pavić travelled to Srebrenica in the immediate aftermath of the Srebrenica massacre. He rejects the interpretation of the events in Srebrenica as a genocide and has accused western powers of using these events to promote the Responsibility to Protect (RSP) doctrine on a global level as a hypocritical justification for military invention and the erosion of national sovereignty.

Pavić served as chief political advisor for Biljana Plavšić from August 1996 to July 1997, standing down at the beginning of the 1997–98 political crisis in the Republika Srpska. When Plavšić later pleaded guilty to crimes against humanity before the International Criminal Tribunal for the former Yugoslavia (ICTY) in 2003, Pavić said, "Biljana Plavšić admitted what she did not do, thinking that she was acting correctly and taking responsibility for the crimes she was charged with. However, the prosecution used it to accuse the entire [Serb] people."

By 2001, Pavić was working as an investment consultant in Belgrade. He has written on various topics from a vantage point of right-wing Serbian nationalism, on one occasion arguing that Serbia's leaders "forgot their historical roots," "abandoned their Orthodox identity," and began "ignoring the[ir] true, natural interests" after the creation of the first Yugoslavia in 1918. In 2007, he published a book entitled, Forbidden truth about Srebrenica - a manual based exclusively on foreign sources. He is a regular speaker at events organized by the Presidency of the Republika Srpska in Belgrade where Milorad Dodik has also been a participant.

In 2016, Pavić wrote an article in which he defended paleoconservatism, attacked neoconservatism, and offered qualified support for Donald Trump's bid to become United States president. He has expressed socially conservative views on many occasions and has, among other things, depicted social acceptance of the LGBTQ community as a form of indoctrination imposed on Serbia by the western powers.

== Politician ==
Pavić appeared in the third position on the We – Voice from the People electoral list in the 2023 Serbian parliamentary election and was elected when the list unexpectedly won thirteen mandates. He took his seat when the new assembly convened in February 2024. Shortly thereafter, the We movement split into two factions, with list holder Branimir Nestorović leaving to form a new group called We – Power of the People (MI–SN). Pavić joined Nestorović's group.

The Serbian Progressive Party (SNS) and its allies won the 2023 election, and both of the We factions served in opposition. Pavić was initially the deputy leader of the MI–SN parliamentary group and also served as deputy chair of the assembly committee on Kosovo and Metohija, a member of the defence and internal affairs committee and the committee on the diaspora and Serbs in the region, a member of Serbia's delegation to the parliamentary assembly of the Collective Security Treaty Organization (CSTO), and a deputy member of Serbia's delegation to the South-East European Cooperation Process (SEECP) parliamentary assembly. He is a member of Serbia's parliamentary friendship group with Australia, New Zealand, and the Pacific Island states (the Bahamas, Fiji, Grenada, Nauru, Palau, Papua New Guinea, the Solomon Islands, Tuvalu, and Vanuatu), as well as the friendship groups with the Caribbean countries (Antigua and Barbuda, Barbados, Belize, Dominica, the Dominican Republic, Haiti, Panama, Saint Kitts and Nevis, Saint Lucia, Saint Vincent and the Grenadines, and Trinidad and Tobago), China, India, Mexico, and Russia.

Pavić later appeared in the third position on the MI–SN list in the 2024 Belgrade city assembly election and was elected when the list won ten seats. As at the republic level, the Progressives and their allies won the election, and the We delegates serve in opposition.

Pavić left MI–SN in March 2026. His departure was primarily the result of Nestorović's decision to start a political party in the Republika Srpska; Nestorović said that Pavić's support for Milorad Dodik made his continued involvement in MI–SN untenable under these circumstances. Pavić also accused MI–SN of wiretapping conversations during this time. He is no longer a member of any political party; in leaving MI–SN, he lost his committee assignments and his membership in the CSTO and SEECP delegations.
