= 2024 Belgrade City Assembly election =

- 2 June 2024
- All 110 seats in the City Assembly; 56 seats needed for a majority
- Turnout: 45.82 (▼12.59 pp)
| Party | Leader | Vote % | Seats | +/– |
|---|---|---|---|---|
| Belgrade Tomorrow | Aleksandar Šapić | 53.79 | 64 | +10 |
| Kreni-Promeni | Savo Manojlović | 18.03 | 21 | New |
| Biramo! | Dobrica Veselinović | 12.42 | 14 | −29 |
| MI–SN | Branimir Nestorović | 8.31 | 10 | New |
| RS | Željko Pantić | 1.18 | 1 | +1 |
This lists parties that won seats. See the complete results below.
Results by municipality
| Mayor before | Mayor after |
|---|---|
| Vacant (Note: Before the establishment of the Temporary Council of Belgrade on 30 October 2023, Aleksandar Šapić of the Serbian Progressive Party served as mayor of Belgrade.) | Aleksandar Šapić; SNS |

Local elections were held in Belgrade on 2 June 2024 amidst reports of irregularities during the 2023 City Assembly election. The election was called after the constitutive session of the City Assembly of Belgrade failed to meet quorum after the 2023 elections.

== Background ==
=== Protests ===
Shortly after the closing of the voting stations, SNS held a press conference at which Vučić reported that SNS placed first in the election, winning 38 percent of the popular vote. The election resulted in a hung parliament, with Nestorović's MI–GIN being the party that could choose whether to side with the ruling coalition of SNS and SPS or the opposition of SPN and NADA. Nestorović said that "even though no one gave us a chance, we became one of the four or five strongest parties"; he rejected cooperating with either one of the blocs after the elections. "I think it will be very difficult to form a city government. There will be new elections, probably soon. We will not support either side", Nestorović also said. Vučić also said that "If Nestorović does not end up supporting anyone, you will have repeat elections". Nestorović and Aleksandar Pavić from MI–GIN rejected cooperation with SPN after the elections and said that cooperation with SNS is possible under certain demands. MI–GIN later released a joint statement in which they said that they will not support anyone and that they are ready for new elections.

Due to the election fraud, SPN announced that it would reject the results, claiming that the election was not fair. Aleksić claimed that over 40,000 ID cards were issued for voters who did not live in Belgrade in order for them to gain the right to vote in the Belgrade City Assembly election. SPN called for the annulling of the results. A day after the election, a mass protest was organised outside the Republic Electoral Commission by SPN. At the protest, Aleksić and Marinika Tepić from SPN announced that they would go on a hunger strike until the election results are annulled. Aleksić and Tepić were later joined by Jelena Milošević, Danijela Grujić, Janko Veselinović, Željko Veselinović, Branko Miljuš, and Dušan Nikezić in the hunger strike.

At the 24 December protest, protesters tried to storm the building of the City Assembly of Belgrade. Vučić issued an urgent statement in response to the attempt to storm the building of the City Assembly of Belgrade, saying that "a revolution is not happening". Amidst the protest, Ćuta was hit with a tear gas.

In the 2023 City Assembly election, the Serbian Progressive Party retained its status as the largest party in the City Assembly by winning 49 seats. However, the government formation process was postponed multiple times amidst opposition protests and boycotts.

=== Government formation ===
Like on national level for the parliamentary elections, opposition parties pledged to form a government, if they were to win a parliamentary majority. Opposition parties and alliances that won representation after the 2023 election and that expressed their support for the formation of a government include SPN and NADA. Pavle Grbović, the president of the Movement of Free Citizens, said that "despite differences, some form of cooperation is possible [with other opposition parties], especially at the level of Belgrade". Vojislav Mihailović, the president of the Movement for the Restoration of the Kingdom of Serbia (POKS) and former mayor of Belgrade, said that "in the local self-government of Belgrade, we do not decide over the Franco-German agreement and other national issues" and that "he does not see what can be disputed about the idea of unity of the entire opposition" after the elections. Miloš Jovanović, the president of the New Democratic Party of Serbia (NDSS), said that "changes can only be made in cooperation with the rest of the opposition".

The constituent session of the City Assembly was held on 19 February. Toma Fila, who as the oldest councillor presided over the City Assembly, said that there was no quorum and that the session would be postponed to 1 March. SNS, SPS and Mi-GIN deputies did not appear in the hall for holding sessions, while opposition councillors entered and unfurled banners waiting for the session to begin. The constituent session of the Assembly of Belgrade was postponed again to 3 March as councillors from SPS, SNS and Mi-GIN did not show up again. Šapić announced that SNS would negotiate with MI-GIN until 3 March. Nestorović, however, re-confirmed MI-GIN's position of not supporting the SNS-led government. The quorum was not met again on 3 March, meaning that a new snap election has to be called by the president of the National Assembly.

== Date ==
During a tour of the Military Technical Institute in Jakovo Vučić told reporters: "If the President of the Serbian Parliament is elected on 11, 12 or 13 March, it doesn’t matter, the elections must be held by 11 or 12 May. So they can be on 28 April, between the 45th and 60th day, according to the law." However, the fact that the president of the Serbian Parliament will (most likely) be elected at the parliamentary session scheduled for 11 March absolutely does not mean that new city elections must be called on that day, or a day or two after that. Since the deadline for the constitution of the Assembly of Belgrade expired on 3 March, the President of the National Assembly must call for new elections for the city assembly within a month from the day when the assembly was supposed to be constituted. Therefore, the deadline for holding the Belgrade elections is 2 June.

The opposition said that they will not participate in the elections if they are scheduled for 28 April because it is impossible to implement the recommendations of the OSCE and because a marathon is scheduled for that day. On 8 March ProGlas, Serbia Against Violence, NADA and Dveri signed an agreement on free elections. In the Agreement, the public service is required to provide timely and truthful information to the citizens about the course of the election process, but also that all those who will participate in the elections be equally represented on the public channels.

On 10 March Vučić said that the elections in Belgrade will be held on 2 June and that all other elections will be held in accordance with the legal and constitutional deadlines.

== Electoral lists ==
The following are the electoral lists that will participate in the election. The wide SNS-led coalition nominating the incumbent mayor Šapić is going to be the first on the ballot.

^{M} — Minority list

| # | Ballot name | Ballot carrier | Main ideology | Political position | Note |
|---|---|---|---|---|---|
| 1 | Aleksandar Vučić – Belgrade Tomorrow; SNS, SPS, SDPS, PS, PUPS, SNP, ZS, NSS, USS, SRS, VMSZ/SVM, JS, ZS, SSZ, Samostalna, PA | Aleksandar Šapić | Populism | Big tent | |
| 2 | Russian Party – Serbs and Russians are Brothers Forever!; RS | Željko Pantić | Russophilia | Right-wing | ^{M} |
| 3 | Dad, This Is For You – Petar Đurić; ĆOJZT | Petar Đurić | Liberalism | Centre | |
| 4 | For a Green Belgrade – When, If Not Now — Dr. Dejan Žujović; UPZS | Tamara Brložanović | Green politics | Left-wing | |
| 5 | 1 of 5 million – Belgrade Front – Rhythm City; 1 of 5 million | Dušan Teodosijević | Liberalism | Centre-left | |
| 6 | We Choose Belgrade! – Dobrica Veselinović – Miloš Pavlović; ZLF, NPS, DS, EU, SPO, PSG, NLS, PZP, USS Sloga, Solidarity | Dobrica Veselinović | Anti-corruption | Big tent | |
| 7 | We – Power of the People – prof. dr. Branimir Nestorović; MI–SN | Branimir Nestorović | Russophilia | Right-wing | |
| 8 | People's List – Key for Victory – New Serbia – Movement I Live for Serbia; Narodna, NS | Vladimir Gajić | Conservativism | Right-wing | |
| 9 | Belgrade Is Our City – Vasilios Proveleggios – Marijana Ivović Vukotić – Dr. Ferid Bulić – Snaga Coalition; BGS, VNS, SJ, SBR, SCG, GSGS | Vasilios Proveleggios | Minority rights | | ^{M} |
| 10 | Roma Union of Serbia — For Belgrade; URS | Nenad Stojanović | Minority rights | | ^{M} |
| 11 | Belgrade is the World — SPP — Usame Zukorlić; SPP | Muhamed Tutić | Minority rights | | ^{M} |
| 12 | Dr Savo Manojlović – I'm Belgrade Too – Kreni-Promeni; Kreni-Promeni | Savo Manojlović | Anti-corruption | Big tent | |
| 13 | Saša Radulović – Enough is Enough – A Solution for Change; DJB | Saša Radulović | Right-wing populism | Right-wing | |
| 14 | We–The Voice from the People; MI–GIN | Branko Pavlović | Conspiracy theorism | Right-wing | |

== Opinion polls ==
| Polling firm | Date of publishment | Sample size | Belgrade Tomorrow | Biramo! | Kreni-Promeni | MI–SN | Others | Lead |
|---|---|---|---|---|---|---|---|---|
| Ipsos | 30 May | 3025 | 47.7 | 16.2 | 16.3 | 7.7 | 12.1 | 31.4 |
| NSPM | 22 May | 1000 | 52.2 | 15.4 | 17.8 | 7.6 | 7.0 | 34.4 |

== Results ==
| Party, alliance, or citizens' group | Votes | % | +/– | Seats | +/– |
|---|---|---|---|---|---|
| Belgrade Tomorrow | 387,326 | 53.79 | +6.37 | 64 | +10 |
| Kreni-Promeni | 129,868 | 18.03 | New | 21 | New |
| We Choose Belgrade | 89,430 | 12.42 | New | 14 | −29 |
| We – Power of the People | 59,805 | 8.31 | New | 10 | New |
| Russian Party | 8,509 | 1.18 | +0.78 | 1 | +1 |
| For a Green Belgrade | 8,485 | 1.18 | New | 0 | New |
| We – Voice from the People | 6,911 | 0.96 | -4.54 | 0 | –6 |
| Enough is Enough | 6,887 | 0.96 | New | 0 | 0 |
| 1 of 5 million | 6,567 | 0.91 | New | 0 | New |
| Dad, This is for You | 5,485 | 0.76 | +0.28 | 0 | 0 |
| People's List – Key for Victory | 4,213 | 0.59 | -1.49 | 0 | 0 |
| Roma Union of Serbia | 3,325 | 0.46 | New | 0 | New |
| Belgrade Is Our City | 2,311 | 0.32 | New | 0 | New |
| Belgrade is the World | 974 | 0.14 | -0.02 | 0 | 0 |
| Total | 720,096 | 100.00 | – | 110 | – |
| Valid votes | 720,096 | 98.09 | | | |
| Invalid/blank votes | 14,039 | 1.91 | | | |
| Total votes | 734,135 | 100.00 | | | |
| Registered voters/turnout | 1,602,150 | 45.82 | | | |
Source: City Election Commission
