= Dragan Stanojević =

Serbian politician and businessman

- Драган Станојевић
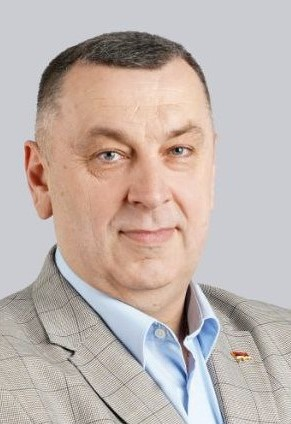

Member of the National Assembly
- Incumbent
- Assumed office 6 February 2024

Personal details
- Born: May 28, 1971 (age 55) Priboj, SR Serbia, SFR Yugoslavia
- Party: MI–GIN (2023–present)
- Occupation: Politician; businessman

Dragan Stanojević (Serbian Cyrillic: Драган Станојевић; born 28 May 1971) is a Serbian politician and businessman who is one of the representatives of the right-wing populist We–The Voice from the People (MI–GIN) political organization. A pro-Russian politician, he was elected to the National Assembly in the 2023 parliamentary election. He was one of the main representatives of the Serbian diaspora in Ukraine until 2014.

== Early life, education and business career ==
Stanojević was born in 1971 in Priboj, SR Serbia, SFR Yugoslavia. According to his official biography, he graduated from the Faculty of Economics, majoring in "business management". From 1989 to 1990 he completed his mandatory military service in the Yugoslav People's Army.

Shortly after, he started working as a security chief in a large construction company. In 1992, he immigrated to Perm, Russia, where he worked as the head of security of a sports complex until 1994. Stanojević eventually started his own business and moved to Ukraine, settling in Dnipropretrovsk. According to Stanojević, his company exported iron, non-ferrous metals and wood and had a turnover of over a million dollars one year. He also had two construction companies.

== Controversial activities in Ukraine ==
He founded the Serbian Municipality "Sveti Sava" organization in Dnipropetrovsk in 1999, which was the first Serbian organization founded in the former USSR. Stanojević was the main initiator, ideologue and sponsor of the creation of an international organization United Serbian Diaspora of Eurasia, which creates branches throughout the CIS.

Stanojević held close relations with pro-Russian political figures in Ukraine and lobbied for the Verkhovna Rada not to recognize Kosovo. Stanojević personally met Yulia Tymoshenko, Viktor Yanukovych, Leonid Kuchma and Volodymyr Zelenskyy.

In 2013, Stanojević was appointed president of the Assembly of Diaspora and Serbs in the Region.

During Euromaidan, Stanojević received threats from a group of "Ukrainian Cossacks", who accused him of being the head of a "Serbian, pro-Russian terrorist organization, a Putin worshipper and a hardened Eurasian". He claimed that he does not leave the house, that he feels threatened and that he also addressed this to the Serbian embassy in Ukraine. United Serbian Diaspora of Eurasia was declared a terrorist organization, a decision which was overturned in court seven years later.

In 2014, he returned to Serbia.

Since June 2021, he has been under the sanctions of the National Security and Defense Council of Ukraine and was banned from entering Ukraine for three years.

== Political career ==
In 2011, Stanojević was photographed with Aleksandar Vučić, the then deputy president of the Serbian Progressive Party (SNS). According to his own words, he was the link between the then-opposition leaders Tomislav Nikolić and Vučić and the Russian government. He also claimed that all the leaders of the then parliamentary parties went to meetings and round tables in Russia, where he was the mediator.

In 2018, he founded the Patriots of the Fatherland and Diaspora Movement (ROD), gaining media presence in the domestic and regional media.

In December 2023, it was revealed that Stanojević is registered as the head of the Serbian office of the Other Ukraine organization founded by Viktor Medvedchuk. The Ukrainian embassy in Serbia later requested a ban on Other Ukraine.

He was elected to the National Assembly in the 2023 parliamentary election as a candidate of the right-wing populist We–The Voice from the People political organization.

== Political views ==
Stanojević is a pro-Russian figure and publicly supports the Russian invasion of Ukraine. He claims that Kosovo is Serbian territory, "even if there are no people there".
