= Uglješa Mrdić =

Serbian politician

- Угљеша Мрдић
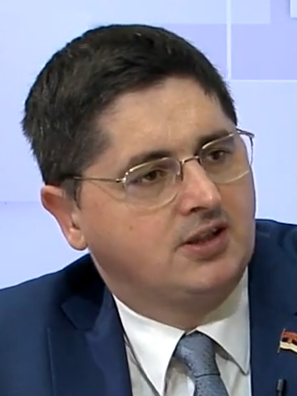
- Mrdić in 2021

Member of the National Assembly of Serbia
- Incumbent
- Assumed office 21 June 2020

Personal details
- Born: 18 March 1978 (age 48) Mostar, SR Bosnia and Herzegovina, SFR Yugoslavia
- Party: Serbian Progressive Party

Uglješa Mrdić (Serbian Cyrillic: Угљеша Мрдић; born 18 March 1978) is a Serbian politician who has served in the National Assembly of Serbia from the Serbian Progressive Party since 2020.

== Private career ==
Mrdić has a Bachelor of Laws degree and lives in Belgrade. He joined the Progressive Party upon its formation in 2008 and has served on its main board.

== Politician ==
=== Municipal ===
Mrdić received the sixteenth position on the Progressive Party's electoral list for the Vračar municipal assembly in Belgrade in the 2016 Serbian local elections and was elected when the list won sixteen mandates. Following the election, he was chosen as leader of the Progressive Party's group in the assembly. He received the tenth position on the Progressive Party's list in the 2020 local elections and was re-elected when the list won thirty-four seats.

=== Member of the National Assembly ===
Mrdić received the 107th position on the Progressive Party's Aleksandar Vučić — For Our Children list in the 2020 Serbian parliamentary election and was elected when the list won a landslide majority with 188 out of 250 mandates. He is a member of the defence and internal affairs committee and the committee on constitutional and legislative issues; a deputy member of the committee on administrative, budgetary, mandate, and immunity issues; and a member of the parliamentary friendship groups with Albania, Argentina, Austria, Belarus, Bosnia and Herzegovina, Brazil, China, Croatia, Germany, Hungary, Israel, Italy, Montenegro, North Macedonia, Peru, Russia, Slovenia, the Sovereign Order of Malta, Switzerland, the United Kingdom, and the United States of America.

Mrdić is the sponsor of judicial laws commonly referred to as Mrdić's Laws.
