= Mitar Kovač =

Serbian politician

Major General Mitar Kovač
- Митар Ковач
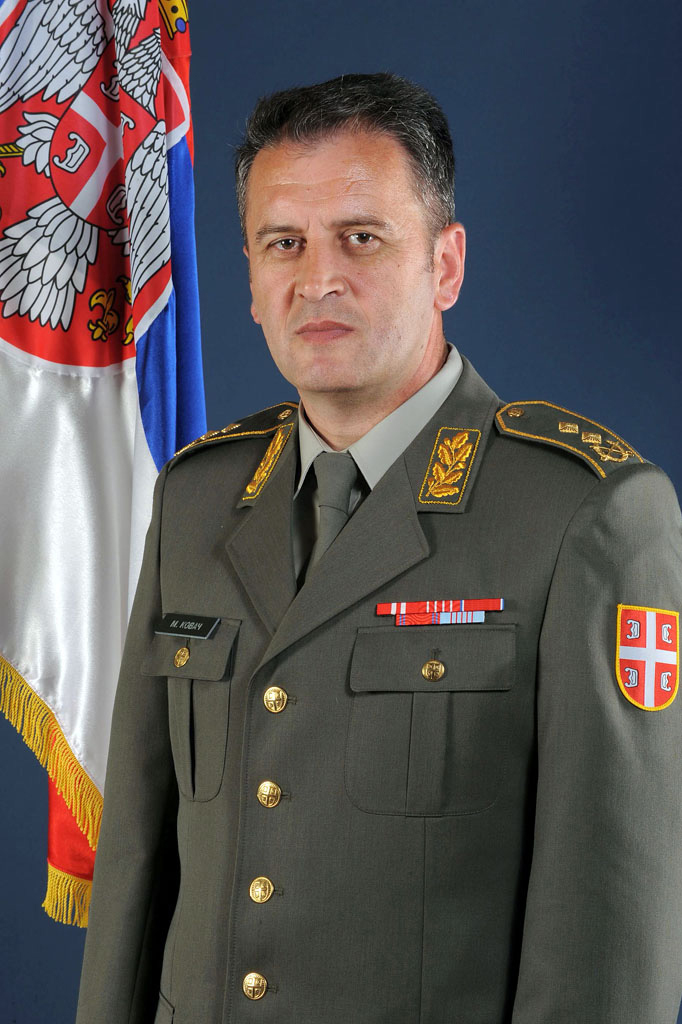
- Kovač in 2008

Member of the National Assembly
- Incumbent
- Assumed office 6 February 2024

Personal details
- Born: 27 July 1959 (age 67) Kalinovik, PR Bosnia and Herzegovina, FPR Yugoslavia
- Party: MI–GIN (2023–present)
- Education: Military Academy
- Occupation: Politician; general; professor

Military service
- Allegiance: SFR Yugoslavia; FR Yugoslavia; Serbia
- Branch/service: Yugoslav Ground Forces; Yugoslav Army; Serbian Army
- Years of service: 1984–2014
- Rank: Major General
- Battles/wars: Bosnian War

Mitar Kovač (Serbian Cyrillic: Митар Ковач; born 27 July 1959) is a Serbian politician, university professor and retired major general who was elected to the National Assembly in the 2023 parliamentary election.

== Early life, education and military career ==
Kovač was born on 27 July 1959 in Ulog, Kalinovik, PR Bosnia and Herzegovina, FPR Yugoslavia.

He graduated from the Military Academy in Belgrade in 1981, then completed postgraduate studies in military sciences in 1990, and in 1998 he received his doctorate in the field of war skills as the youngest doctor of military sciences. He also completed the School of National Defense, as well as general staff training in 2002.

He briefly fought in the Bosnian War as a member of the Army of Republika Srpska.

He worked as a researcher at the Institute for Strategic Research and was president of the editorial board of the magazine Vojno delo for two terms.

From 2004 to 2010, he was the head of the Directorate for Strategic Planning in the Ministry of Defense, and from 2010 to 2013, he was the head of the Directorate for Planning and Development of the Serbian Armed Forces in the General Staff. Between 2013 and 2014, he was the head of the Directorate for Strategic Planning once again.

He retired on 22 December 2014 at his personal request. As a defense military expert, he appeared at the trial of Ratko Mladić at the ICTY.

He is a professor at the Faculty of Project and Innovation Management.

== Political career ==
He was elected to the National Assembly in the 2023 parliamentary election as a candidate of the right-wing populist We–The Voice from the People political organization.
