= Savo Manojlović =

Serbian lawyer, activist and politician

- Саво Манојловић
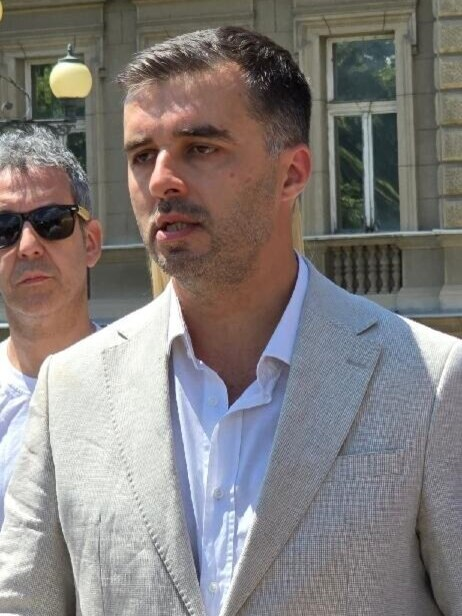
- Manojlović in 2024

Member of the City Assembly of Belgrade
- Incumbent
- Assumed office 21 June 2024

Personal details
- Born: 25 January 1986 (age 40) Priština, SAP Kosovo, SR Serbia, SFR Yugoslavia
- Party: Kreni-Promeni
- Education: University of Belgrade
- Occupation: Lawyer; activist; politician

Savo Manojlović (Serbian Cyrillic: Саво Манојловић; born 25 January 1986) is a Serbian lawyer, activist and politician. A representative of the Kreni-Promeni political organization, he was elected to the City Assembly of Belgrade following the 2024 election.

== Early life and education ==
Manojlović was born on 25 January 1986 in Priština, SAP Kosovo, SR Serbia, SFR Yugoslavia. Due to the Kosovo War, the family moved to Belgrade where Manojlović completed his education. He graduated from the Faculty of Law, University of Belgrade in 2008. During his studies, he was a scholarship recipient of the Government of Serbia, the Businessmen's Club, the Belgrade Čukarica Rotary Club and the Konrad Adenauer Foundation. He completed his master's studies at the Faculty of Law and also obtained his doctorate at the same faculty. For his doctoral dissertation he received the Miodrag Jovičić Foundation Award for the best doctorate and scientific contribution in the field of constitutional law and the political system for 2020 and 2021.

== Law career ==
Manojlović worked as a junior advisor in the Constitutional Court of Serbia. As the secretary of the working groups of the Ministry of Justice and the Ministry of Finance, he participated in their work and wrote the draft of the existing Law on the Financing of Political Activities, as well as its amendments. He was the central coordinator of the Anti-Corruption Agency for the monitoring of political campaign financing for the local, provincial and general elections in 2012. He was engaged as a legal expert or campaign organizer in numerous projects related to judicial reform, improvement of the economic environment, consumer protection, financing of political parties and transparent employment.

Manojlović has been employed at the Institute for Comparative Law since 2015 and is currently a research associate. He is the president of the Association for the Protection of Constitutionality and Legality. He is a member of the Serbian Association for Constitutional Law and the Assembly of Free Serbia.

== Activism ==
As a representative of the Kreni-Promeni organization, he was the leader of the 2021–2022 Serbian environmental protests against the Rio Tinto investment in Serbia. He also led the protests against the proposal to amend the Law on Referendum and People's Initiative and the Law on Expropriation.

Manojlović was detained by the police in 20 November 2024 during a protest against the demolition of the Old Sava Bridge.

== Political career ==
Following the partial opposition boycott of the 2024 Belgrade City Assembly election, Manojlović announced that Kreni-Promeni will take part in the local elections, with Manojlović as the mayoral candidate. Kreni-Promeni placed second in Belgrade with around 17.7% of the popular vote, which is the individual opposition result since 2012. Kreni-Promeni also passed the electoral census in Niš, Novi Sad and Sremska Mitrovica. On 6 June 2024, Manojlović announced that Kreni-Promeni won't participate in the City Assembly of Belgrade as a form of protest against electoral fraud and the ruling Serbian Progressive Party.
