= Kreni-Promeni =

Political movement in Serbia

Kreni-Promeni Крени-Промени
- Abbreviation: KP
- Representative: Savo Manojlović
- Founder: Savo Manojlović
- Founded: 2020
- Headquarters: Brankova 9, Belgrade
- Ideology: Environmentalism; Animal rights; Animal welfare
- Political position: Centre-right
- Colors: Yellow
- National Assembly: 0 / 250
- Assembly of Vojvodina: 0 / 120
- City Assembly of Belgrade: 21 / 110

Website
- kreni-promeni.org

Kreni-Promeni (Serbian: Крени-Промени, lit. 'Go-Change' or 'Move-Change', abbr. KP) is a political movement in Serbia. The campaign director Savo Manojlović is the head of the movement. A centre-right movement, KP promotes local politics, environmentalism, and animal rights. They are known for launching petitions on various political issues.

KP started its activities in 2020, initially focusing on environmental themes. They were one of the organisers of the 2021–2022 Serbian environmental protests, protesting against Rio Tinto's project near Loznica. They launched a petition against lithium exploitation during the protests but it was rejected by the National Assembly of Serbia. After the protests, they organised a petition against lithium and borate mining. KP expanded its activities in 2023, creating an animal welfare team within the movement and organising petitions and activities related to animals. KP refused to participate in the 2023 Serbian parliamentary election, but later took place in the 2024 Serbian local elections in Belgrade, its municipalities, Niš, and Novi Sad. They gained representation in the assemblies of Belgrade, New Belgrade, Novi Sad, and Niš. Since the beginning of the student-led anti-corruption protests, KP has voiced its support for the students. After the 15 March 2025 protest in Belgrade, KP launched a petition for an investigation into the alleged use of a sonic weapon during the protest.

KP is a self-described anti-corruption movement and it serves in opposition to the Serbian Progressive Party. They have criticised the European Union over its position on the Rio Tinto project, proposed the confiscation of national broadcast licences of pro-government television channels, and successfully led an initiative for the introduction of free textbooks in Sremska Mitrovica.

== History ==
=== 2020–2022: Early beginnings ===
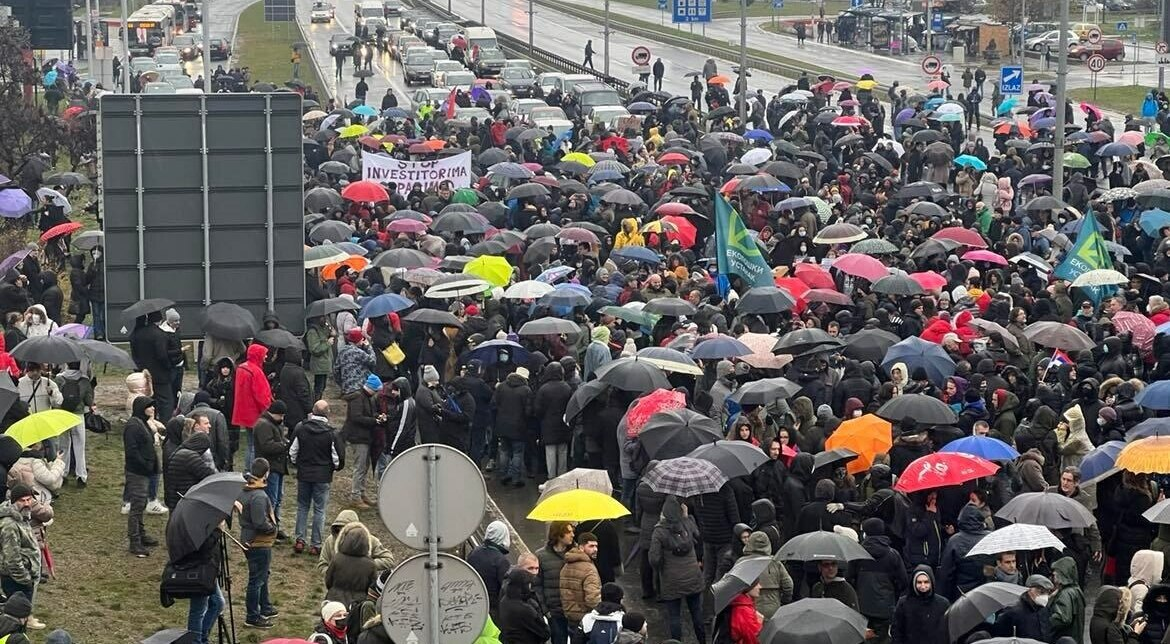
Kreni-Promeni (KP) was one of the organisers of the 2021–2022 Serbian environmental protests

Kreni-Promeni (KP, translated to English as Go-Change or Move-Change) started out as an activist group that launched petitions on various issues. One of its first activities was organised in August 2020, when students who were members of KP launched a petition for the reduction of school fees by 30%. They led several protests in September and October of that year, and in December, KP launched an environmental petition focused on air quality in Serbia. In February 2021, KP activists put up a billboard in Belgrade with attached cotton lungs that would gradually darken as they absorb polluted air. Savo Manojlović, a lawyer and environmental activist, said in an interview that their air quality petition reached 51,000 signatories up to that point. However, the communal police asked for the removal of the billboard. In response, KP rented a different billboard in Belgrade.

In June 2021, KP launched another petition, this time focusing on the Rio Tinto-led project near Loznica. KP said that it had collected 90,000 signatories up to 8 June. Later in September, the 2021–2022 Serbian environmental protests began. KP was one of its organisers, demanding an end to the Rio Tinto-led project near Loznica and prohibition of borate and lithium mining. KP helped create an advertisement against Rio Tinto, featuring citizens and actors. They asked the Radio Television of Serbia (RTS) to air the ad, but RTS declined. In response, KP organised a protest in front of the RTS building. KP also organised several physical blockades of roads in Belgrade and in other locations in Serbia. After it was announced that the Expropriation Law would be withdrawn, KP stopped organising protests. Manojlović announced on 14 January 2022 that it had filed a petition against lithium exploitation with 290,000 signatories. The petition was, however, rejected by the National Assembly of Serbia, and in response, KP organised a protest on 20 January. A day later, Manojlović welcomed the government's decision to revoke the licence for the project. They, however, briefly resumed protesting in February. Amidst the protests, KP and several other non-governmental organisations launched a petition against changes to the Law on Referendum; according to them it had reached 68,000 signatories by 24 November. The proposed changes included the abolition of the 50%+1 turnout required for a referendum's result to be considered valid.

After the end of the environmental protests, KP launched a petition to prohibit lithium and borate mining in Serbia. By early April, KP said that the petition had over 32,000 signatories. Later in November, Manojlović also announced that the petition had the support of 61 members of the National Assembly. Manojlović and KP refused to participate in the 2022 Serbian general election. In June, KP launched a petition against granting the pro-government television channels Pink and Happy national broadcast licences. By 7 June, KP said that the petition had 56,000 signatories, while by 15 June it reached over 200,000 signatories. The petition was not acted upon by the Regulatory Body for Electronic Media; Pink and Happy were given the licences again in July 2022. In December, KP put up 20 billboards that measure air quality in Novi Sad.

=== 2023–present: Mainstream prominence ===
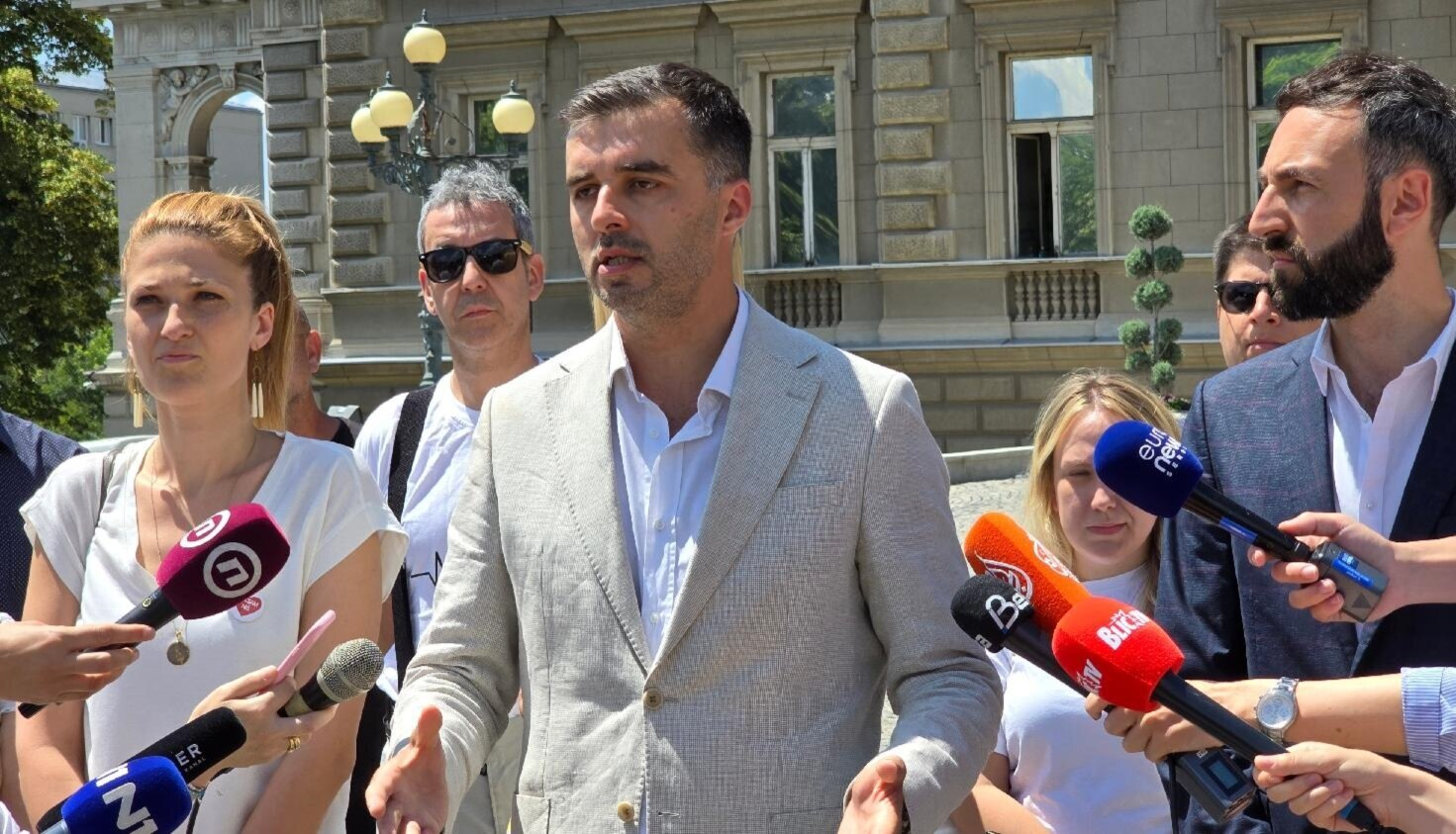
Savo Manojlović, the representative of KP, holding a press conference after the 2024 Belgrade City Assembly election

In January 2023, KP announced that its petition against the urbanisation of the Tara National Park reached 64,000 signatures; the petition was initiated in December 2022. A month later, it launched an animal rights petition towards dog shelters. Together with several organisations, KP organised an action of cleaning up the streets in 146 locations in Serbia in April. In September, it submitted a petition for the introduction of free textbooks in Serbia, with over 50,000 signatories. Manojlović said in an interview that KP refused to file an electoral list for the 2023 Serbian parliamentary election, instead opting to monitor the elections. In the elections, KP had 233 observers who reported 52 irregularities in the election. In January 2024, KP submitted a petition against obstetric violence. A month later, it organised a humanitarian event where it collected dog food, while in March it began collecting signatures for the protection of the General Staff Building in Belgrade.

Manojlović announced that KP will participate in the 2024 Belgrade City Assembly election in April 2024. They nominated Manojlović as their mayoral candidate. They participated in the election as a citizens' group (grupa građana), not as a political party. Manojlović said that, in the event of an opposition victory, he would work with the Green–Left Front on forming a local government. The political consultant Dušan Milenković argued that KP could attract opposition voters who were dissatisfied with other opposition parties. KP ended up winning 21 seats in the City Assembly of Belgrade. Most of KP's voters previously voted for opposition parties. Additionally, KP participated in elections in Zemun, New Belgrade, Voždovac, Lazarevac, Niš, Sremska Mitrovica, and Novi Sad. They were denied participation in the local elections in Belgrade's Vračar municipality due to failing to meet the gender quota. KP won 8 seats in the City Assembly of Novi Sad and 2 seats in the City Assembly of Niš. After the elections, Manojlović said that KP would boycott the sessions of the City Assemblies of Belgrade and New Belgrade. They ended the boycott in September.

KP led the July 2024 environmental protests. When the student-led anti-corruption protests started in November 2024, KP expressed its support for the students and called citizens to participate in their protests. After the 15 March 2025 protest in Belgrade, KP launched a petition for the investigation into the alleged use of a sonic weapon during the protest. By 17 March, the petition had over 530,000 signatories. In the same month, they launched a petition against the organisation of Expo 2027. KP monitored the 2025 Serbian local elections in Kosjerić and Zaječar, alleging election irregularities.

== Ideology and platform ==
=== Political leanings ===
Manojlović defined KP as pursuing the introduction of reference prices, anti-corruption measures inspired by Laura Kövesi and Verica Barać, and environmental and youth-oriented policies, such as the utilisation of cryptocurrency in government. KP has been positioned on the centre-right on the political spectrum. Manojlović said that KP is opposed to the Serbian Progressive Party, arguing that the left-wing and right-wing opposition parties have to unite to defeat it in elections. Following the resignation of Miloš Vučević in January 2025, KP called for the formation of a transitional government that would be composed of experts. In July 2025, they presented an anti-corruption programme that would eliminate corruption in the government of Serbia. Manojlović said that he would like to see Serbia "without corruption, and as an ecological country without Rio Tinto" (bez korupcije, ekološku državu bez Rio Tinta). The scholar Jagoda Topalov described KP as one of the movements that have voiced support for equality and social change.

=== Foreign policy ===
KP has criticised the European Union over its position on the Rio Tinto project in Loznica. Manojlović has said that that European Union's support for the project amounts to the "destruction of the rule of law and the creation of a green Europe with Serbia as a black hole" (razaranje vladavine prava i stvaranje zelene Evrope sa Srbijom kao crnom rupom). In October 2024, they organised a protest against the visit of Ursula von der Leyen. Manojlović has also criticised the German Konrad Adenauer Foundation. Amidst the Banjska attack in North Kosovo, KP called for the demilitarisation of the region. KP has criticised the SNS position towards Kosovo and has opposed the 2023 Ohrid Agreement.

=== Domestic issues ===
During the 2021–2022 Serbian environmental protests, KP highlighted its positions on environmental issues. It opposed the Rio Tinto-led Jadar project, and called for the prohibition of borate and lithium mining by introducing a moratorium. KP believed that by introducing a moratorium, Rio Tinto would not come back to Serbia. Manojlović has criticised low environmental standards in Bor. In the 2024 Belgrade City Assembly campaign, KP highlighted its environmental policies, such as by proposing expansions to green areas in New Belgrade.

KP is an animal rights party. They operate a team for animal welfare. In 2023 it launched a petition concerning dog shelters, while a year later it held a humanitarian event where they collected dog food. In January 2025, KP brought attention to a dog shelter in Ruma where dogs were locked up and held in bad conditions. Later in June, they brought attention to a dog shelter where they alleged that animals were mistreated and killed.

In November 2023, KP supported the workers' strike in Pošta Srbije. KP supports lowering the value-added tax for menstrual products. In December 2023, it gave out condoms to students as part of the international day against HIV. KP opposes giving national broadcast licences to the pro-government Pink, Happy, Informer TV, and Studio B television channels.

=== Local issues ===
In the 2024 Belgrade City Assembly election, KP campaigned on improving infrastructure and the environment, as well as on anti-corruption sentiment. KP opposed the demolition of the Old Sava Bridge; Manojlović was arrested at one of the protests opposing its demolition. KP opposes the demolition of the building of the General Staff Building and the construction of Trump Tower Belgrade. It also opposes the expansion of the Belgrade Waterfront project; it has submitted a petition with 34,000 signatories to oppose the destruction of the Belgrade Fair to the Agency for Spatial Planning and Urbanism. They also oppose the organisation of EXPO 2027.

In Sremska Mitrovica, KP proposed the introduction of free textbooks. Their initiative was adopted in August 2024. They also proposed the same in Niš in August 2024. In Novi Sad, it opposes the construction of the Novi Sad on Water project, and supports the renovation of maternity hospitals.

== Organisation ==
Manojlović is the head of KP; he is officially the campaign director. Their headquarters is at Brankova 9 in Belgrade.

== Electoral performance ==
=== Parliamentary elections ===
National Assembly of Serbia
Year	Leader	Popular vote	% of popular vote	#	# of seats	Seat change	Coalition	Status	Ref.
2026	Savo Manojlović	Did not participate			0 / 250	0	Supported SL	Extra-parliamentary	

=== Belgrade City Assembly elections ===
City Assembly of Belgrade
Year	Leader	Popular vote	% of popular vote	#	# of seats	Seat change	Status	Ref.
2024	Savo Manojlović	129,868	18.03%	▲2nd	21 / 110	▲21	Opposition	
