= Branko Pavlović =

Serbian politician and lawyer

- Бранко Павловић
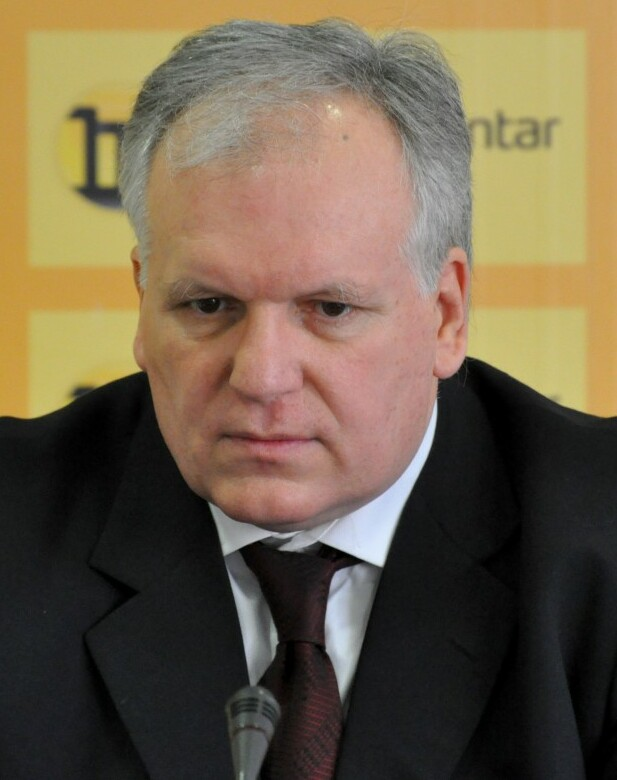
- Pavlović in 2017

Member of the National Assembly
- Incumbent
- Assumed office 6 February 2024
- In office January 2001 – December 2003

Personal details
- Born: 11 June 1960 (age 66) Belgrade, PR Serbia, FPR Yugoslavia
- Party: SKJ (1983—1987); GSS (1992—1996); SDU (1996—2003); MI–GIN (2023–present)
- Education: University of Belgrade
- Occupation: Politician; lawyer

Branko Pavlović (Serbian Cyrillic: Бранко Павловић; born 11 June 1960) is a Serbian politician and lawyer. Following the overthrow of Slobodan Milošević, Pavlović served as a member of the National Assembly from January 2001 to December 2003 and was the director of the Agency for Privatization from 15 April to 15 July 2004.

He is now one of the representatives of the right-wing populist We–The Voice from the People political organization.

== Early life, education and career ==
Pavlović was born on 11 June 1960 in Belgrade, PR Serbia, FPR Yugoslavia. He graduated from the Faculty of Law of the University of Belgrade in 1984, and in 1986 he started working as a trainee lawyer. He passed the bar exam in 1988, and since 1989 he has been practicing law.

== Political career ==
Pavlović was a member of the League of Communists of Yugoslavia (SKJ) from 1983 until 1987. He was later one of the founders of the Civic Alliance of Serbia (GSS). Following a split within GSS, Pavlović, along with Žarko Korać, was one of the founders of the Social Democratic Union (SDU) and was elected its vice-president. He served as a member of the National Assembly from January 2001 to December 2003 after being elected MP as part of the Democratic Opposition of Serbia (DOS) coalition. He left SDU in 2003 and formed the Initiative for Normal Serbia.

In 2004, he was the director of the Agency for Privatization.

He was the leader of the list Branko Pavlović – "Because it has to be better" on 2007 Serbian parliamentary election that won no seats.

He was elected to the National Assembly in 2023 election as a candidate of the right-wing populist We–The Voice from the People political organization.
