= We – Voice from the People =

Political organisation in Serbia

We – Voice from the People Ми – Глас из народа
- Abbreviation: MI–GIN
- Leader: Collective leadership
- Founders: Branimir Nestorović; Jovan Janjić; Mitar Kovač; Siniša Ljepojević; Aleksandar Pavić; Branko Pavlović; Dragan Stanojević
- Founded: 2023
- Ideology: Russophilia; Right-wing populism; Conspiracy theorism; Anti-vaccination
- Political position: Right-wing
- Parliamentary group: We – Voice from the People
- Colours: Dark green; Dark blue
- National Assembly: 0 / 250
- Assembly of Vojvodina: 0 / 120
- City Assembly of Belgrade: 0 / 110

Website
- miglasiznaroda.rs

The We – Voice from the People (Serbian: Ми — Глас из народа, Mi — Glas iz naroda, abbrev. MI–GIN) is a populist political organisation in Serbia. Until the 2024 split, the main representative of MI–GIN was Branimir Nestorović, a prominent pulmonologist and conspiracy theorist. MI–GIN gained national representation in the National Assembly of Serbia and City Assembly of Belgrade following the 2023 Serbian parliamentary election and 2023 Belgrade City Assembly election.

== History ==
=== Background and formation ===
In the 2022 Serbian parliamentary election, Branimir Nestorović supported the Dveri–POKS list, which helped this list in attracting votes. After the election, Nestorović said that he was dissatisfied with the Dveri list, and that Serbia "deserves a national, non-partisan, honest and decent option. With people who will not trade mandates and votes after the election".

Nestorović announced the creation of the movement on 23 June 2023.

=== 2023 election ===
The movement announced that it would participate in the 2023 Serbian parliamentary election on 27 October 2023. Prior to that, it was mainly centered around a YouTube channel. On 26 November 2023, the movement submitted 10 thousand signatures to the Republican Electoral Commission of Serbia, and on 27 November it was registered for the 2023 Serbian parliamentary election. Nestorović has said that the campaign had been done only with the help of social media, and that "appropriate space" for a campaign was not given to the movement. Reportedly, 12 000 euros were spent on the campaign.

Following the elections in Belgrade, Nestorović rejected the possibility of joining any coalition, either that of the SNS or SPN.

Following the 2024 split, MI-GIN was left with 6 MPs in the National Assembly.

== Ideology and platform ==
During the 2023 campaign, Nestorović drew attention to Serbia's weak healthcare system and called for its improvement. It has cooperated with the far-right Our Homeland Movement and Alternative for Germany.

== Electoral performance ==
=== Parliamentary elections ===
National Assembly of Serbia
Year	Leader	Popular vote	% of popular vote	#	# of seats	Seat change	Status	Ref.
2023	Branimir Nestorović	178,830	4.82%	▲5th	13 / 250	▲13	Opposition	
2026	Collective leadership	Did not participate			0 / 250	▼13	Extra-parliamentary	

=== Belgrade City Assembly elections ===
City Assembly of Belgrade
Year	Leader	Popular vote	% of popular vote	#	# of seats	Seat change	Status	Ref.
2023	Aleksandar Jerković	50,535	5.5%	▲4th	6 / 110	▲6	Snap election	
2024	Branko Pavlović	6,911	0.96%	▼7th	0 / 110	▼6	Extra-parliamentary	
