= We – Power of the People =

Political party in Serbia

We – Power of the People Ми – Снага народа Mi – Snaga naroda
- Abbreviation: MI–SN
- President: Branimir Nestorović
- Founder: Branimir Nestorović; Aleksandar Pavić; Borislav Antonijević
- Founded: 27 March 2024; 2 years ago
- Registered: 16 March 2026; 7 months ago
- Split from: We – Voice from the People
- Headquarters: Bulevar oslobođenja 83, Belgrade
- Ideology: Nationalism; Populism; Conspiracy theorism
- Political position: Right-wing
- Colours: Blue; Red
- National Assembly: 0 / 250
- Assembly of Vojvodina: 0 / 120
- City Assembly of Belgrade: 10 / 110

Website
- mi-snaganaroda.rs

We – Power of the People (Serbian: Ми – Снага народа, romanised: Mi – Snaga naroda, abbr. MI–SN) is a right-wing populist political party in Serbia, led by pulmonologist Branimir Nestorović. It was formed in March 2024 by a faction that split from We – Voice from the People (MI–GIN), and was registered as a political party in March 2026. In the 14th National Assembly, it had its own parliamentary group, which had five members when the assembly was dissolved in September 2026. After an internal split, it did not take part in the 2026 parliamentary election.

== History ==
=== Formation ===
The movement was formed after the faction led by Nestorović left We – Voice from the People, following the refusal of that movement's collective leadership to declare Nestorović its president and a conflict between its founders Dragan Stanojević and Aleksandar Pavić at a meeting in Pančevo. It was initially known as True We – Voice from the People (Прави Ми – Глас из народа, Pravi Mi – Glas iz naroda). On 27 March 2024, Nestorović announced that the movement would be renamed We – Power of the People. Its MPs formed a separate parliamentary group in the National Assembly.

In the 2024 Belgrade City Assembly election, MI–SN won 8.31% of the vote and 10 seats, finishing fourth.

=== Registration and departure of Pavić ===
By a decision of the Ministry of Public Administration and Local Self-Government of 16 March 2026, the movement was entered in the Register of Political Parties as the "Movement We – Power of the People" (Pokret Mi snaga naroda), under number 135, with Nestorović as its legal representative.

On 23 March 2026, Aleksandar Pavić resigned from all his functions in the party, citing his disagreement with Nestorović's plan to found a new party in Republika Srpska while MI–SN was not yet organised "even in all 17 Belgrade municipalities", and with Nestorović's criticism of Milorad Dodik. Nestorović said that Pavić had left because he supported Dodik.

=== 2026 split ===
Ahead of the 2026 snap parliamentary election, MI–SN held talks with Aleksandar Vulin's Movement of Socialists (PS) on a joint list. Nestorović said that "people from the Russian Federation" had asked him to gather all Russophile parties and movements in Serbia, including the PS. Members of the party's presidency who opposed the coalition were removed by an extraordinary session of the party assembly, a decision they described as illegal; the PS then said it did not want to be the cause of a split in the movement. Nestorović was hospitalised in mid-September.

The assembly removed five members of the presidency, including MPs Borislav Antonijević, Branko Lukić, Slobodan Ilić and Ana Ivanović. While Nestorović announced that MI–SN would run together with the People's Party and several smaller movements, the removed members, who contested the decision, held a session of the presidency on 21 September at which they decided that the party would not take part in the election. The following day, People's Party president Vladimir Gajić said that his party would not run with MI–SN because of Nestorović's serious health problems and the party's internal conflicts. On 23 September, Lukić, who under the party statute represents the party while Nestorović is incapacitated, informed the Republic Electoral Commission that MI–SN would not take part in the election.

== Ideology ==
NIN has described MI–SN as a nationalist and right-wing populist party, highlighting Nestorović's promotion of conspiracy theories. The party itself rejects the left–right political spectrum.

== Electoral history ==
=== Parliamentary elections ===
National Assembly of Serbia
Year	Leader	Popular vote	% of popular vote	#	# of seats	Seat change	Coalition	Status	Ref.
2026	Branimir Nestorović	Did not participate			0 / 250	▼5	–	Extra-parliamentary	

=== Belgrade City Assembly elections ===
City Assembly of Belgrade
Year	Leader	Popular vote	% of popular vote	#	# of seats	Seat change	Coalition	Status	Ref.
2024	Branimir Nestorović	59,805	8.31%	4th	10 / 110	▲8	–	Opposition	
