= Branimir Nestorović =

Serbian pulmonologist and conspiracy theorist

- Бранимир Несторовић
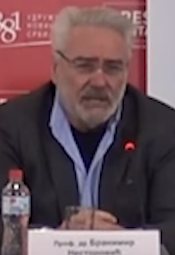
- Nestorović in 2021

President of We – Power of the People
- Incumbent
- Assumed office 28 March 2024
- Preceded by: Party established

Member of the National Assembly
- Incumbent
- Assumed office 6 February 2024

Personal details
- Born: 16 December 1954 (age 71) Belgrade, PR Serbia, FPR Yugoslavia
- Party: SPO (until 2000); DS (later); Independent (later); MI–GIN (2023–2024); MI—SN (2024–present)
- Education: University of Belgrade
- Occupation: Politician; pulmonologist; university professor

Branimir Nestorović (Serbian Cyrillic: Бранимир Несторовић; born 16 December 1954) is a Serbian politician, pulmonologist, conspiracy theorist, and retired university professor serving as the member of the National Assembly since 6 February 2024. He is one of the representatives of the We–The Voice from the People organisation and was elected to the National Assembly and the Belgrade City Assembly in 2023. In his career, he was also a paediatrician, allergist, and a professor emeritus of the Faculty of Medicine, University of Belgrade.

== Early life and education ==
Nestorović was born on 16 December 1954 in Belgrade, PR Serbia, FPR Yugoslavia. He graduated from the Natural-Mathematics Department of the Obrenovac Gymnasium. He completed his studies at the Faculty of Medicine of the University of Belgrade in 1979 and gained his doctorate at the same faculty in 1985 with a dissertation in the narrow scientific field of paediatrics and allergology titled Pollen Allergy in Children.

== Career ==
=== Medical career ===
Nestorović was the head of the Department of Pulmonology and Allergology at the University Children's Hospital in Belgrade.

=== Academic career ===
In 1987, he was elected as an assistant at the Faculty of Medicine in Belgrade. He was re-elected in 1991, and was elected to the position of assistant professor in 1995. He became an associate professor in 2000 and was re-elected in 2009.

He holds the title of full professor in the field of paediatrics and has published paediatrics textbooks.

=== Controversial medical stances ===
He gained notoriety for downplaying the impact of the COVID-19 pandemic, and his support for the anti-vaccination and alternative medicine movements. As a member of the COVID-19 crisis team, appointed by the government of Serbia, he proclaimed COVID-19 as the "funniest virus in the history of mankind".

Nestorović has endorsed many conspiracy theories, such as existence of a secret cure for cancer, usage of Tesla's death ray in Iraq and Serbia, and existence of "time portals" which send people to the future.

== Political career ==
Nestorović was previously a member of the Serbian Renewal Movement and he took part in the protests against Slobodan Milošević in the 1990s. In 1999, following the formation of SPS-SPO coalition, Nestorović was the assistant to the minister of education. After the overthrow of Slobodan Milošević in 2000, he became a member of the Democratic Party. In 2022, he publicly endorsed the Dveri–POKS electoral list for the 2022 Serbian parliamentary election.

In 2023, he was one of the founders of the right-wing populist We–The Voice from the People political organisation. He was also its ballot carrier in the 2023 parliamentary elections and the Belgrade City Assembly election. MI—GIN passed the electoral census in both elections and Nestorović was elected to the National Assembly and the Belgrade City Assembly. Following the preliminary results for the Belgrade City Assembly election, president Aleksandar Vučić stated that Nestorović's organisation will be the kingmaker for Belgrade's local government.

He was sworn in as MP in the National Assembly on 6 February 2024. Nestorović raised a controversy at the constitutive session of the National Assembly by comparing the Serbia Against Violence MP's to Gypsies. He later apologized to the Romani community.
