= 2023 Vojvodina provincial election =

- 17 December 2023
- All 120 seats in the Assembly of Vojvodina; 61 seats needed for a majority
- Turnout: 58.99% (▲8.76 pp)
Electoral list	Leader	Vote %	Seats	+/–
AV–VNSDS	Damir Zobenica	48.82	66	−10
SPN	Marinika Tepić, Mihailo Brkić	22.55	30	New
NADA	Branislav Ristivojević	5.30	7	−3
SPS–JS–ZS	Dušan Bajatović	5.21	7	−6
Minority lists
VMSZ	Bálint Juhász	6.68	9	−2
RS	Slobodan Nikolić	1.04	1	New
This lists parties that won seats. See the complete results below.
Election results by municipality
President of the Government before	President of the Government after
Igor Mirović; SNS	Maja Gojković; SNS

Provincial elections were held in Vojvodina on 17 December 2023 to elect members of the Assembly of Vojvodina. Initially scheduled to be held by 30 June 2024, the possibility of calling a snap election was discussed in 2023. The Assembly dissolved itself on 16 November 2023, setting the election date for 17 December. It was concurrently held with the parliamentary and local elections in 65 cities and municipalities in Serbia.

The Serbian Progressive Party (SNS), which came to power in Vojvodina in 2016, won a supermajority of seats in the 2020 election due to the election boycott that was proclaimed by most opposition parties, including Alliance for Serbia which claimed that the election would not be free and fair. Igor Mirović also retained his position as the president of the government of Vojvodina. The election was preceded by the death of the Assembly president István Pásztor in October 2023. The Provincial Electoral Commission proclaimed 13 electoral lists for the election. For the first time ever, Mirović was not present on the SNS electoral list and did not take part in its election campaign.

The election resulted in SNS losing its supermajority, but still retaining a parliamentary majority on its own. The opposition Serbia Against Violence alliance also crossed the threshold. After the election, Maja Gojković succeeded Mirović as the president of the government.

== Background ==
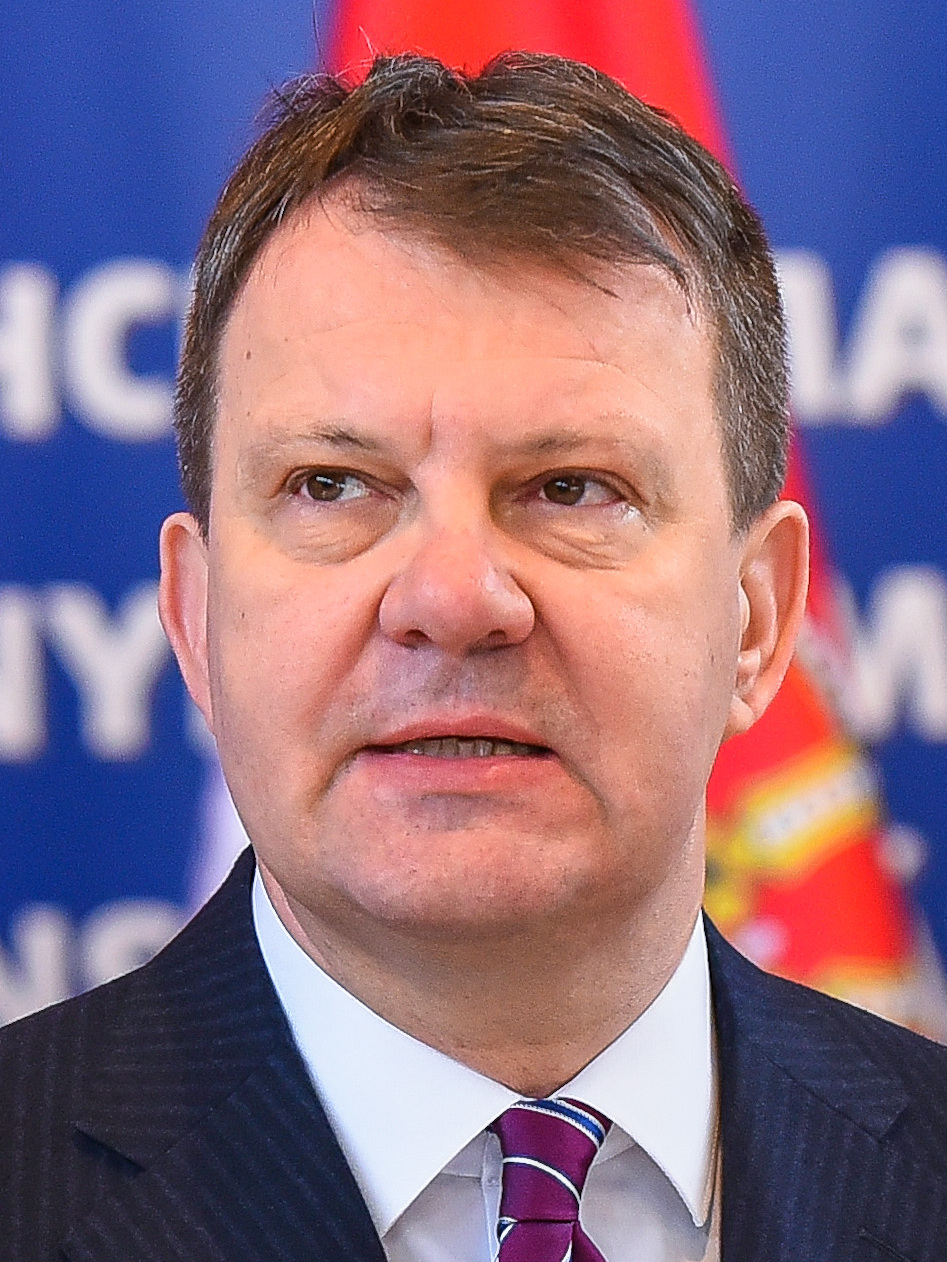
Igor Mirović, president of the government of Vojvodina from 2016 to 2024

A populist coalition led by the Serbian Progressive Party (SNS) came to power in Vojvodina after the 2016 election, along with the Socialist Party of Serbia (SPS) and Alliance of Vojvodina Hungarians (VMSZ). Since then, Igor Mirović of SNS has been the president of the government of Vojvodina. On national level in Serbia, Aleksandar Vučić, who initially served as deputy prime minister and later as prime minister, was elected president of Serbia in 2017. Since he came to power, observers have assessed that Serbia has suffered from democratic backsliding into authoritarianism, followed by a decline in media freedom and civil liberties. In 2023, the V-Dem Institute categorised Serbia as an electoral autocracy, while Freedom House noted that SNS has "eroded political rights and civil liberties, put pressure on independent media, the opposition, and civil society organisations".

The For Our Children coalition, led by SNS, won a supermajority of votes and seats in the 2020 provincial election. SNS was followed by the SPS–United Serbia (JS) coalition which won 13 seats, the Vojvodina Front, led by the League of Social Democrats of Vojvodina (LSV), which won 6 seats; Democratic Party of Serbia (DSS) and Movement for the Restoration of the Kingdom of Serbia (POKS) each won 5 seats, while the Serbian Radical Party (SRS) won 4 seats. The election was organised amidst the boycott of most opposition parties, including the leading Alliance for Serbia (SZS) coalition, which claimed that election conditions are not free and fair. Following the election, Mirović was re-elected as president of the government of Vojvodina, establishing a coalition government composed of SNS, SPS, JS, and VMSZ. Since the 2020 provincial elections, general elections were organised in Serbia in April 2022. This time, SNS led the Together We Can Do Everything coalition, which lost its parliamentary majority in the election. However, twelve electoral lists in total, including the ones from the opposition, crossed the 3 percent threshold. In Novi Sad, the capital of Vojvodina, SNS was met with a decline in support in the election.

== Electoral system ==
The 120 members of the Assembly of Vojvodina are elected by closed-list proportional representation from a single nationwide constituency. Eligible voters vote for electoral lists, on which the registered candidates are present. A maximum of 120 candidates could be present on a single electoral list. An electoral list could be only submitted by a registered political party; until 2023, a coalition of political parties or a citizens' group could do it as well. To submit an electoral list, at least 4,000 valid signatures must be collected, though ethnic minority parties only need to collect 2,000 signature to qualify on ballot. At least 40 percent of candidates on electoral lists must be female. The electoral list is submitted by its chosen ballot representative. An electoral list could be declined, after which those who had submitted can fix the deficiencies in a span of 48 hours, or rejected, if the person is not authorised to nominate candidates. The name and date of the election, names of the electoral lists and its ballot representatives, and information on how to vote are only present on the voting ballot.

The Provincial Electoral Commission (PIK), local election commissions, and polling boards oversee the election. Seats are allocated using the d'Hondt method with an electoral threshold of 3 percent of all votes cast, although the threshold is waived for ethnic minority parties. The seats are distributed by dividing the total number of votes received by the electoral list participating in the distribution of seats by each number from one to 120. If two or more electoral lists receive the same quotients on the basis of which the seat is distributed, the electoral list that received the greater number of votes has priority. Seats are awarded to candidates from electoral lists according to their order, starting with the first candidate from an electoral list.

A provincial election is called by the president of the Assembly of Vojvodina, who also has to announce its date and dissolve the Assembly in the process. It is possible for a snap election to take place. To vote, a person has to be a citizen and resident of Serbia and at least 18 years old. At least five days before the election, citizens are notified about the election, receive information about the day and time of the election, and the address of the polling station where they could vote. During the election day, registered voters could vote from 07:00 (UTC+01:00) to 20:00, though if the polling station is opened later than 07:00, voting is then extended by the amount of time for which the opening of the polling station was delayed.

Until 2014, provincial elections were conducted under a mixed electoral system; 60 seats were conducted under a proportional representation system and the other 60 seats were conducted under a first-past-the-post majoritarian system. Since then, all 120 seats have been conducted under a proportional representation system. Dejan Bursać, an associate at the Institute of Political Studies in Belgrade, noted that with this change, geographical and minority representation decreased in the Assembly of Vojvodina while the representation of women increased.

Parliamentary groups led by SNS, SPS–JS, and VMSZ introduced a proposal to amend the electoral system of Vojvodina in September 2023. They had proposed to lower the number of needed valid signatures and to bar coalitions and citizens' groups from taking place in the future elections. The Assembly of Vojvodina adopted the changes on 4 October, with 90 votes in favour.

=== Election date ===
In April 2023, the newspaper Danas reported that snap parliamentary elections, local elections, Vojvodina provincial election, and the Belgrade City Assembly election could be held as early as in November 2023. At a press conference in July 2023, Aleksandar Vučić, the president of Serbia and former president of SNS, said that an early parliamentary election "could take place in September or December if the opposition parties agree. And if not, we will have general elections in April or May 2024, to be held concurrently with the Vojvodina provincial election and the regular local elections". By law, the Vojvodina provincial election and regular local elections could be held as late as 30 June 2024. Darko Glišić, the president of the SNS executive board, stated that the local and provincial elections will be held in the first half of 2024. In August, Vučić said that provincial and local elections will "certainly be held in the next six or seven months", and that "most likely, parliamentary ones will be held as well".

Newspaper Nova and news portal N1 reported in September 2023 that local, provincial, and parliamentary elections could be held as early as 19 December 2023. Vučić and Miloš Vučević, the president of SNS, also held a gathering with officials from Vojvodina on 5 September, with newspaper Blic reporting that the official date will be revealed after the 78th United Nations General Assembly, which is set to be held on 18–26 September. In late September, Vučić announced that the elections will be called in December 2023 for them to be organised on 4 March 2024. He subsequently announced that they could be held on 17 December 2023. Mirović, however, stated that he does not plan to resign from the position of the president of the government of Vojvodina.

Due to the death of István Pásztor, the president of the Assembly of Vojvodina, in late October 2023, a new president of the Assembly of Vojvodina had to be elected for the elections to be called on 17 December, considering that the president of the Assembly of Vojvodina only has the right to call provincial elections. Portal Autonomija described the situation as "unprecedented in the history of the Assembly of Vojvodina". Momo Čolaković, elected president of the Assembly of Vojvodina on 6 November, scheduled a session of the Assembly for 16 November, proposing an early termination of mandates for the election to be called on 17 December. With 95 votes in favour, the Assembly dissolved itself on 16 November, setting the election date for 17 December.

=== Political parties ===
The table below lists political parties and coalitions elected to the Assembly of Vojvodina after the 2020 provincial election.

Name	Ideology	Political position	Leader	2020 result	
Name	Ideology	Political position	Leader	Votes (%)	Seats
SNS–led coalition	Populism	Big tent	Igor Mirović	61.58%	76 / 120
SPS–JS	Populism	Big tent	Dušan Bajatović	11.18%	13 / 120
Alliance of Vojvodina Hungarians	Minority politics	Centre-right	István Pásztor	9.29%	11 / 120
Vojvodina Front	Vojvodina autonomism	Centre-left	Nenad Čanak	5.12%	6 / 120
Democratic Party of Serbia	National conservatism	Right-wing	Branislav Ristivojević	4.38%	5 / 120
POKS	National conservatism	Right-wing	Goran Ivančević	4.21%	5 / 120
Serbian Radical Party	Ultranationalism	Far-right	Đurađ Jakšić	3.27%	4 / 120

=== Pre-election composition ===
Pre-election parliamentary composition
Groups	Parties	MPs	
Groups	Parties	Seats	Total
Aleksandar Vučić – For Our Children	SNS	68	78
Aleksandar Vučić – For Our Children	PSS–BK	3	78
Aleksandar Vučić – For Our Children	PUPS	3	78
Aleksandar Vučić – For Our Children	SDPS	3	78
Aleksandar Vučić – For Our Children	PS	2	78
Aleksandar Vučić – For Our Children	SPO	1	78
Aleksandar Vučić – For Our Children	SV	1	78
Socialist Party of Serbia – United Serbia	SPS	8	13
Socialist Party of Serbia – United Serbia	JS	3	13
Socialist Party of Serbia – United Serbia	ZS	1	13
Socialist Party of Serbia – United Serbia	PZB	1	13
Vajdasági Magyar Szövetség – Pásztor István	VMSZ/SVM	11	11
NADA – New DSS – POKS	NDSS	4	8
NADA – New DSS – POKS	POKS	4	8
Vojvodina Front – League of Social Democrats of Vojvodina, Vojvodina's Party	LSV	5	6
Vojvodina Front – League of Social Democrats of Vojvodina, Vojvodina's Party	VP	1	6
MPs not members of parliamentary groups	SRS	4	4

== Pre-election activities ==
=== Government parties ===
The Serbian Patriotic Alliance (SPAS), a party that won several seats in the City Assemblies of Novi Sad and Kikinda, was offered to merge into SNS in May 2021. Aleksandar Šapić, the leader of SPAS, accepted the offer and SPAS ceased to exist on 29 May. In preparation for the 2022 elections, SNS affirmed their cooperation with SPS. However, after the 2022 elections, Vučić hinted at a potential formation of a bloc or a movement, which he later revealed in March 2023 to be the People's Movement for the State (NPZD). He said that NPZD would act as a "supra-party movement" and that SNS would not be dissolved. Miloš Vučević, the former mayor of Novi Sad, was elected president of SNS in May 2023 and affirmed that SNS would take part in the movement, with Vučić as its leader. The movement is set to be formed by September 2023.

Dušan Bajatović, the leader of SPS in Vojvodina, announced in July 2023 the preparations for the upcoming elections in Vojvodina.

=== Opposition parties ===
In the aftermath of the 2020 elections, SZS was dissolved and succeeded by the United Opposition of Serbia coalition. However, this coalition would be dissolved by January 2021. Parties in the coalition, namely the Party of Freedom and Justice (SSP), People's Party (Narodna), and Democratic Party (DS), renewed their cooperation in November 2021, in preparation for the 2022 elections. They formalised the United for the Victory of Serbia (UZPS) alliance in January 2022 which ultimately won 14 percent of popular vote in the 2022 parliamentary election. After the elections, SSP retained connections with the Movement of Free Citizens as members of the Ujedinjeni parliamentary group, however, Narodna, DS, and members of the We Must alliance, went their own ways.

DSS and POKS signed a cooperation agreement in January 2021, further expanding it in May 2021 with the creation of the National Democratic Alternative (NADA). POKS was, however, met with a leadership dispute in December 2021. DSS changed its name to New Democratic Party of Serbia (NDSS) in May 2022, while a month later Vojislav Mihailović was legally recognised as the president of POKS. In February 2023, POKS left the local government of Novi Sad, which is led by SNS. Soon after, more than 120 members of POKS defected to SNS, while POKS established connections with NDSS in the Assemblies of Novi Sad and Vojvodina through the formations of the NADA parliamentary groups.

Zdravko Ponoš, the presidential candidate of the UPZS alliance, also left Narodna after the 2022 elections. He formed the Serbia Centre (SRCE) organisation in June 2022 which was registered as a political party in July 2023. Within Narodna, a dispute between its president Vuk Jeremić and vice-president Miroslav Aleksić began in June 2023. Aleksić was eventually removed from the position of the party's executive board in July 2023; he then publicly acknowledged the conflict between him and Jeremić. Although a leadership is scheduled for October 2023, Aleksić left Narodna and reconstituted the People's Movement of Serbia (NPS) in August 2023.

Although the We Must alliance ceased to exist after the 2022 elections, its member parties said that they would continue cooperating in the National Assembly. Together, with Aleksandar Jovanović Ćuta, Biljana Stojković, and Nebojša Zelenović as its co-presidents, was formed in June 2022 as a merger of Together for Serbia, Ecological Uprising, and Assembly of Free Serbia. Solidarity, which was also affiliated with the We Must alliance, merged into Together in January 2023. NDB announced in late June 2022 that it had adopted a platform to work on becoming a registered party, while it began collecting signatures in May 2023. It also announced that it would rename itself to Green–Left Front (ZLF). ZLF was formalised in July 2023.

== Electoral lists ==
With the dissolution of the Assembly, the deadline to submit electoral lists was set for 26 November. The collective electoral list was published by PIK on 1 December. The following table includes electoral lists that were confirmed by PIK and that took part in the 2023 Vojvodina provincial election.

^{M} — National minority list

#	Ballot name	Ballot carrier	Main ideology	Political position	Signatures	Note
1	Aleksandar Vučić – Vojvodina Must Not Stop; SNS, SDPS, PS, PUPS, SPO, SV/SN, ZS	Dušanka Golubović	Populism	Big tent	7,079	
2	Ivica Dačić – Prime Minister of Serbia; SPS, JS, ZS, PZB	Dušan Bajatović	Populism	Big tent	5,932	
3	Dr Vojislav Šešelj – Serbian Radical Party; SRS	Đurađ Jakšić	Ultranationalism	Far-right	5,933	
4	Russian Party – Serbs and Russians are brothers forever!; RS	Ljubica Bertović	Russophilia	Right-wing	2,409	^{M}
5	Dr Miloš Jovanović – NADA for Serbia – NADA for Vojvodina – Serbian coalition NADA – National Democratic Alternative – New Democratic Party of Serbia (New DSS) – Movement for the Restoration of the Kingdom of Serbia (POKS) – Vojislav Mihailović; NDSS, POKS	Branislav Ristivojević	National conservatism	Right-wing	4,379	
6	Alliance of Vojvodina Hungarians – For our President, For our Community, For the Future!; VMSZ/SVM	Bálint Juhász	Minority politics	Centre-right	6,526	^{M}
7	Serbia Against Violence – Marinika Tepić – Mihailo Brkić; SSP, NPS, ZLF, DS, Zajedno, SRCE, EU, PSG, NLS, PZP, USS Sloga, Fatherland, GDP, PR/RP, APV	Stanko Pužić	Anti-corruption	Big tent	5,094	
8	Tomislav Žigmanov – United for Justice – Democratic Alliance of Croats in Vojvodina, Usame Zukorlić – Justice and Reconciliation Party – Bosniaks of Sandžak; DSHV, SPP	Tomislav Žigmanov	Minority politics		2,117	^{M}
9	Čedomir Jovanović – Vojvodina Must Be Different; LDP (Note: Candidates on Jovanović's list are formally taking part under the "Čedomir Jovanović – It Must Be Different" citizens group)	Tatjana Tabački	Liberalism	Centre	4,560	
10	People's Party – Safe Choice. Serious People – Vuk Jeremić, Siniša Kovačević, dr Sanda Rašković Ivić, Đorđe Vukadinović; Narodna	Siniša Sević	Conservatism	Right-wing	4,678	
11	Milica Đurđević Stamenkovski – Boško Obradović – National Gathering – State-Building Force – Serbian Party Oathkeepers – Serbian Movement Dveri; SSZ, Dveri	Dejan Vuković	Ultranationalism	Far-right	4,348	
12	Saša Radulović (Enough is Enough–DJB) – Boris Tadić (Social Democratic Party–SDS) – Ana Pejić (Stolen Babies) – Good Morning Serbia; DJB, SDS, OBAP, DUR	Aleksandar Bujić	Anti-Ohrid Agreement		4,402	
13	Vojvodinians – League of Social Democrats of Vojvodina – Vojvodinians, Democratic Fellowship of Vojvodina Hungarians, Together for Vojvodina – Bojan Kostreš; LSV, VMDK/DZVM, ZZV	Bojan Kostreš	Vojvodina autonomism	Centre-left	4,735	

== Campaign ==
Political scientist Dejan Bursać argued that the provincial election has been largely overshadowed by the parliamentary election.

=== Slogans ===
Party/coalition	Original slogan	English translation	Refs
Alliance of Vojvodina Hungarians	Elnökünkért, közösségünkért, a jövőért!; Za našeg predsednika, za našu zajednicu, za budućnost!	For our President, for our community, for the future!	
National Democratic Alternative	Promene sad!	Changes now!	
People's Party	Siguran izbor. Ozbiljni ljudi	Safe choice. Serious people	
Serbia Against Violence	Promena je počela!	Change has begun!	
Serbian Radical Party	Otadžbina Srbija. Majka Rusija	Fatherland Serbia. Mother Russia	
SDS–DJB–OBAP	Dobro jutro Srbijo!	Good morning Serbia!	
SNS coalition	Vojvodina ne sme da stane	Vojvodina must not stop	
SPS–JS–ZS	Ivica Dačić – Premijer Srbije	Ivica Dačić – Prime Minister of Serbia	

=== Debates ===
2023 Vojvodina provincial election debates
Date	Time	Organizers	P Present A Absent invitee I Invitee N Non-invitee									
Date	Time	Organizers	SNS	SPS	SPN	SRS	NADA	DJS	VMSZ/SVM	NO	LSV	Refs
24 Nov	8:05 pm	RTV	P Dušanka Golubović	P Slobodan Cvetković	P Mihailo Brkić	P Đurađ Jakšić	N	N	N	N	N	
1 Dec	8:05 pm	RTV	P Stanislava Hrnjak	N	N	N	P Branislav Ristivojević	P Aleksandar Bujić	P Bojan Bagi	N	N	
6 Dec	9:00 pm	N1	A	A	P Mihailo Brkić	P Đurađ Jakšić	N	N	N	P Borko Ilić	P Bojan Kostreš	

=== Party campaigns ===
==== Serbian Progressive Party ====
SNS began collecting signatures for its electoral list on 16 November, once the elections were called. Vučević called for "even development of Vojvodina". SNS submitted its list to PIK on the same day, with 7,079 collected signatures in total. Their electoral list was confirmed by PIK a day later. The Strength of Serbia Movement, which previously ran candidates on the SNS electoral list, did not submit any of their candidates for the 2023 election. Saša Vujić from Healthy Serbia also appears on the list, while Milan Đukić, despite being a Serbian Renewal Movement (SPO) member, is listed as a SNS candidate due to SPO not signing a cooperation agreement with SNS. Incumbent president of the government of Vojvodina, Mirović, however, is not present on the list for the first time since 2012. Mirović has previously criticised Vučević. Mirović did not take part in the 2023 election campaign and was absent from SNS billboards in Vojvodina; Damir Zobenica was instead seen as the main representative of SNS during the election campaign.

==== Socialist Party of Serbia ====
SPS submitted its list to PIK on 17 November, with 5,932 collected signatures. PIK confirmed the list on 19 November.

==== Serbia Against Violence ====
Represented by Marinika Tepić and Mihailo Brkić, the Serbia Against Violence (SPN) coalition submitted its electoral list on 21 November. The Action of Progressive Vojvodina also filed candidates on the SPN electoral list. "Our places from all over Vojvodina should be a breeding ground for knowledge, education and upbringing, and not for crime", Tepić has said. PIK confirmed the SPN electoral list on 22 November.

==== National Democratic Alternative ====
NADA submitted its list on 20 November, after collecting 4,379 signatures. Its list was confirmed by PIK on 22 November.

==== Serbian Radical Party ====
The electoral list of SRS was submitted on 18 November, with 5,933 collected signatures. Đurađ Jakšić was announced as their ballot holder; Jakšić said that SRS is in favour of a unitary state "with one parliament, one government and one president, without autonomous provinces". Jakšić claimed that Vojvodina does not have historical foundation and that it should not exist. PIK confirmed the SRS list on 19 November. Jakšić has expressed his support for the construction of a main water supply to solve the water supply problem in the North Banat and Central Banat districts.

==== Alliance of Vojvodina Hungarians ====
Shortly after the midnight on 21 November, VMSZ submitted its electoral list with 6,526 signatures. Its electoral list was confirmed by PIK a day later. VMSZ received support from the Democratic Party of Vojvodina Hungarians and Party of Hungarian Unity. VMSZ expressed their support for further decentralisation in Vojvodina.

==== Russian Party ====
Shortly after SRS submitted their list, the Russian Party also submitted theirs, with 2,409 signatures in total. The Russian Party also submitted a request for their electoral list to be registered as a minority list. PIK confirmed the Russian Party's electoral list on 19 November, allowing the list to be registered as a minority one. Ljubica Bertović, who is featured first on the Russian Party list, is also a member of SNS.

==== United for Justice ====
The Democratic Alliance of Croats in Vojvodina (DSHV) and Justice and Reconciliation Party coalition submitted its electoral list to PIK on 24 November, with 2,117 signatures. Tomislav Žigmanov of DSHV, the ballot holder of the United for Justice, said that the coalition supports multiculturalism and that it would support the expansion of minority rights. PIK confirmed the United for Justice electoral list on 26 November.

==== Others ====
The Liberal Democratic Party of Čedomir Jovanović submitted its electoral list on 25 November, with 4,560 signatures in total. Its electoral list was confirmed by PIK on 26 November. Narodna of Vuk Jeremić also submitted its electoral list on 26 November, with 4,678 signatures in total. Siniša Kovačević was announced as its ballot holder and main representative. On 26 November, PIK also received the electoral lists of the LSV–Democratic Fellowship of Vojvodina Hungarians–Together for Vojvodina coalition, which collected 4,735 signatures, the National Gathering (NO) coalition of Serbian Party Oathkeepers and Dveri, which collected 4,348 signatures, and the Enough is Enough (DJB)–Social Democratic Party (SDS) coalition, which collected 4,402 signatures. Narodna's and NO coalition's electoral lists were confirmed by PIK on 27 November. On 29 November, PIK confirmed the LSV and DJB–SDS electoral lists.

The LSV-led and DJB–SDS coalitions emphasised their support for decentralisation. The Democratic Union of Roma filed candidates on the DJB–SDS electoral list.

== Opinion polls ==
The graph below showcases major parties and alliances in opinion polls from the 2020 Vojvodina provincial election to 17 December 2023.

Local regression chart of poll results from 21 June 2020 to 17 December 2023

Polling firm	Date of publishment	Sample size	SNS–led coalition	SPS–JS	VMSZ	SPN						LSV	NADA		NO		Narodna	Others	Lead
Polling firm	Date of publishment	Sample size	SNS–led coalition	SPS–JS	VMSZ	SSP	PSG	DS	ZZS/Together	NDB/ZLF	SRCE	LSV	NDSS	POKS	SSZ	Dveri	Narodna	Others	Lead
2023 election	17 December	–	48.8	5.2	6.7	22.5						2.6	5.3		2.4		0.8	5.7	26.3
ŠSM	5 April 2023	?	41.7	7.4	5.5	4.0	1.7	2.9	6.8	1.8	2.4	3.0	5.0	1.4	2.1	3.8	0.9	9.2 (Note: DJB: 3.0%, SRS: 2.1%, SDS: 1.3%, Minority parties: 1.9%, Blank vote: 1.3%)	34.3
ŠSM	22 February 2023	?	43.3	8.5	5.1	3.2	1.6	2.5	3.6	1.4	4.0	2.3	4.1	2.4	5.0	3.1	1.6	8.3 (Note: DJB: 2.6%, SRS: 2.1%, SDS: 1.2%, SPP: 0.2%, ZS: 0.1%, LDP: 0.05%, Minority parties: 0.8%, Blank vote: 1.4%)	34.8
ŠSM	10 December 2021	1,525	56.4		2.9	18.3			8.7		–	1.8 (Note: Including the LDP and GDF)	2.8		1.7	0.7	18.3 (Note: As part of the SSP coalition)	6.7 (Note: DJB: 1.9%, SDS–Nova: 1.2%, SRS: 1.0%, Levijatan: 1.0%, #1od5m: 0.8%, S90/ZS: 0.04%, Blank ballots: 0.8%)	38.1
2020 election	21 June 2020	–	61.6	11.2	9.3	–						5.1	4.4	4.2	–			7.9	50.4

== Results ==
There were 1,669,791 citizens in total who had the right to vote in the provincial election. Elections were repeated at five voting stations.

Electoral list	Votes	%	+/–	Seats	+/–
Vojvodina Must Not Stop	466,035	48.82	–12.76	66	–10
Serbia Against Violence	215,197	22.55	New	30	New
Alliance of Vojvodina Hungarians	63,721	6.68	–2.61	9	–3
National Democratic Alternative	50,582	5.30	–3.29	7	–3
SPS–JS–ZS	49,775	5.21	–5.97	7	–4
LSV–VMDK–ZZV	24,625	2.58	–2.54	0	–6
National Gathering	22,487	2.36	New	0	New
Serbian Radical Party	21,135	2.21	–1.06	0	–4
Good Morning Serbia	14,715	1.54	New	0	New
Russian Party	9,907	1.04	New	1	New
People's Party	8,140	0.85	New	0	New
SPP–DSHV	4,979	0.52	–0.14	0	–
Vojvodina Must Be Different	3,221	0.34	–0.24	0	–
Total	954,519	100.00	–	120	0
Valid votes	954,519	96.91			
Invalid/blank votes	30,444	3.09			
Total votes	984,963	100.00			
Registered voters/turnout	1,669,791	58.99			
Source: Provincial Electoral Commission

== Aftermath ==
The Assembly of Vojvodina was constituted on 9 February 2024. Juhász Bálint of the Alliance of Vojvodina Hungarians was elected president of the Assembly. At the session on 8 May, the Assembly elected Maja Gojković as the new president of the government of Vojvodina, succeeding Mirović.
