= National Gathering (Serbia) =

Political coalition in Serbia

National Gathering Национално окупљање
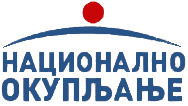
- Abbreviation: NO
- Representatives: Boško Obradović; Milica Đurđević Stamenkovski; Ratko Ristić
- Founded: 4 October 2023; 3 years ago
- Dissolved: 30 December 2023; 2 years ago
- Ideology: Ultranationalism; Ultraconservatism
- Political position: Far-right
- Colours: Blue

Website
- nacionalnookupljanje.rs

National Gathering (Note: Also translated as National Rally.) (Serbian: Национално окупљање, romanised: Nacionalno okupljanje, abbr. NO), initially known as the Serbian State-Building Bloc (Serbian: Српски државотворни блок, romanised: Srpski državotvorni blok, abbr. SDB), was a far-right political coalition in Serbia, composed of Serbian Party Oathkeepers (SSZ) and Dveri. Formed in October 2023, the NO took part in the parliamentary, Vojvodina provincial, and Belgrade City Assembly elections, all of which were held on 17 December 2023.

During the campaign period, the NO was represented by Boško Obradović, the president of Dveri, Milica Đurđević Stamenkovski, the president of SSZ, and Ratko Ristić, the coalition's mayoral candidate for Belgrade. The election coalition was unsuccessful; it failed to cross the threshold and lost all of its representation in the bodies. It was dissolved shortly afterwards. Despite not having any representation in the National Assembly, SSZ joined the Serbian Progressive Party (SNS)-led government in May 2024.

An ultranationalist coalition, the NO was critical of the ruling SNS. It opposed the Ohrid Agreement, the independence of Kosovo, and the accession of Serbia to the European Union and NATO; instead, it proposed closer relations with Russia, China, and the BRICS. NO received support from the far-right Alternative for Germany, and it also organised a gathering with the Hungarian Our Homeland Movement and Bulgarian Revival parties.

== History ==
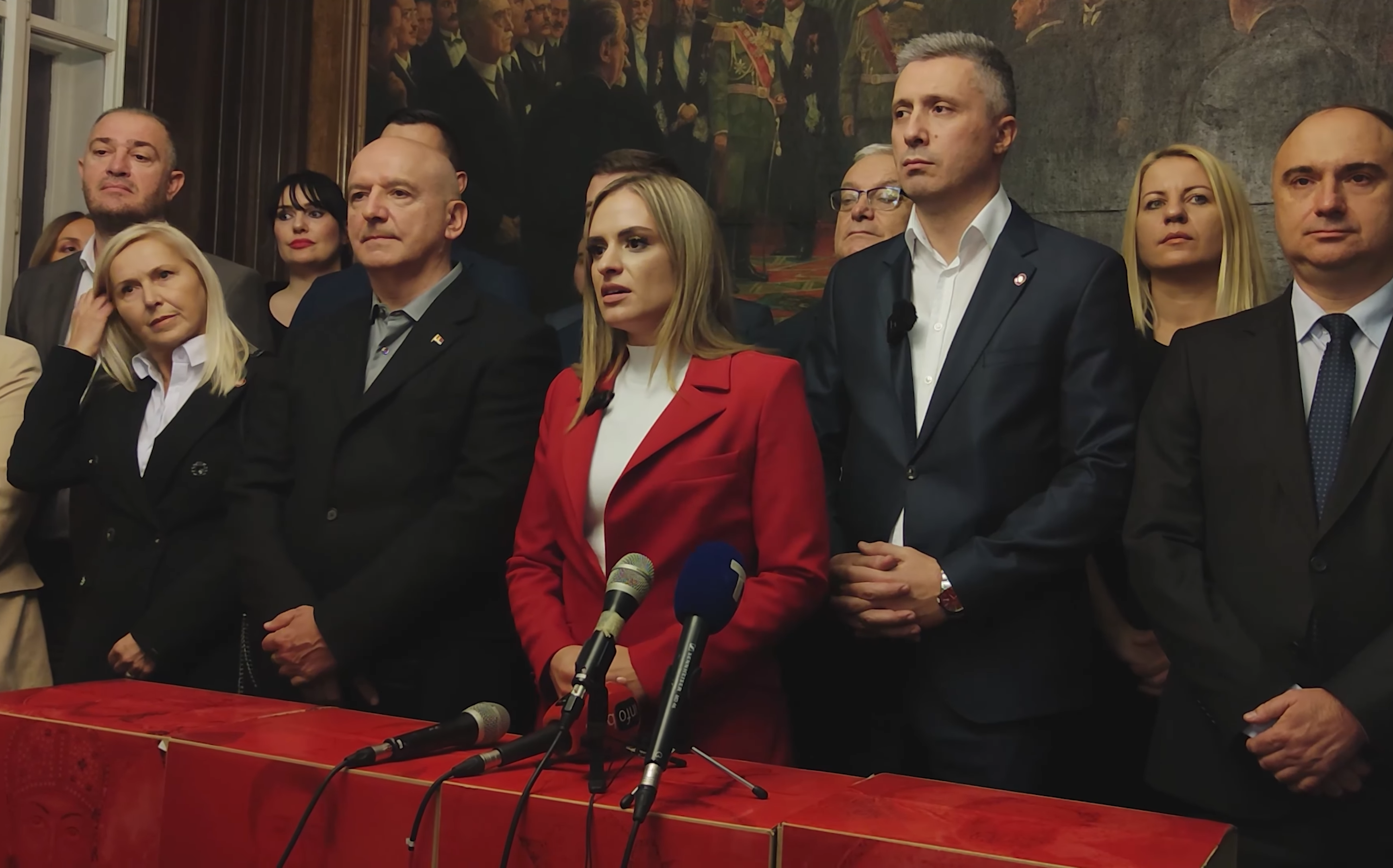
The National Gathering (representatives pictured) was led by the Serbian Party Oathkeepers and Dveri

=== Background ===
The Serbian Party Oathkeepers (SSZ), led by Milica Đurđević Stamenkovski, and Dveri, led by Boško Obradović, had been cooperating as early as April 2022, when they signed a document in which they pledged to oppose any sanctions against Russia that are related to the Russian invasion of Ukraine. At the press conference, Đurđević Stamenkovski added that, however, SSZ and Dveri did not sign a pre-election coalition agreement or an agreement on merging their parliamentary groups in the National Assembly of Serbia.

Their cooperation was further expanded in October 2022, when, together with the National Democratic Alternative (NADA), which is composed of New Democratic Party of Serbia (NDSS) and Movement for the Restoration of the Kingdom of Serbia (POKS), and the People's Party (Narodna), they signed a joint declaration for the "reintegration of Kosovo into the constitutional and legal order of Serbia" (za reintegraciju KiM u ustavno-pravni poredak Srbije). Later that month, SSZ, Dveri, NDSS, and POKS submitted a proposed resolution against introducing sanctions against Russia in the National Assembly. Beginning in January 2023, SSZ, Dveri, and NADA organised protests and called for the rejection of the Ohrid Agreement, a proposed agreement to normalise relations between Serbia and Kosovo. They organised protests in January and March 2023.

=== Formation ===
Inside the City Assembly of Belgrade, SSZ and Dveri formed a joint councillor group in September 2023, named "Serbian Movement Dveri – Serbian Party Oathkeepers – Patriotic Bloc". Đurđević Stamenkovski was presented as the group's leader, however, she said that Radmila Vasić would instead act as its main spokesperson. A month later, on 4 October 2023, SSZ and Dveri formed the Serbian State-Building Bloc (SDB). Alongside Đurđević Stamenkovski and Obradović, Miloš Ković, a historian and professor at the Faculty of Philosophy, was also one of its initiators; Obradović also added that academics Dušan Proroković, Ratko Ristić, and Valentina Arsić Arsenijević were also part of the bloc, despite not attending the press conference. SSZ and Dveri announced that they would take part together in the upcoming elections, and they invited NADA, Narodna, and "other extra-parliamentary and parliamentary parties that are opposed to the [Ohrid Agreement] to join the bloc" (druge vanparlamentarne i parlamentarne činioce koji se protive francusko nemačkom predlogu da postanu deo ovog bloka).

SSZ and Dveri announced on 9 October that they had begun talks with NADA, Narodna, and other extra-parliamentary parties to expand SDB for the upcoming elections. Miloš Jovanović, the president of NDSS, did not rule out NADA joining SDB; he also said that "if it does not happen it will not be a drama" (i ako se ne desi nije drama). Further talks between SSZ, Dveri, NDSS, POKS, and Narodna were held in late October 2023; however, Stefan Stamenkovski, on behalf of SSZ, rejected the proposed document to create a single electoral list for the 2023 parliamentary election. Đurđević Stamenkovski herself said that "they had multiple constructive discussions" (imali su nekoliko konstruktivnih razgovora) but that there would not be a single electoral list consisting of SSZ, Dveri, NDSS, POKS, and Narodna. Following these negotiations, Ković disassociated himself with SSZ and Dveri.

=== Elections and aftermath ===
On 27 October, SSZ and Dveri presented Ristić as their mayoral candidate for the elections in Belgrade. Once the elections were called on 1 November, SSZ and Dveri announced that they would contest the elections under the National Gathering (NO) label instead. The Republic Electoral Commission confirmed their electoral list on 5 November, with Đurđević Stamenkovski as the ballot holder. For the Belgrade City Assembly election, their electoral list was confirmed on 13 November. Their electoral list for the Vojvodina provincial election was confirmed on 27 November. NO held its last campaign convention on 10 December.

In the elections, NO failed to cross the electoral threshold, and thus it lost representation in the National Assembly of Serbia and the City Assembly of Belgrade and failed to gain representation in the Assembly of Vojvodina. Subsequently, Obradović resigned as president of Dveri and announced his retirement from national politics. Ristić also defected to the We – Power of the People (MI–SN) organisation of Branimir Nestorović. The coalition was eventually dissolved on 30 December. SSZ changed its perception of SNS after the elections. It was initially announced that SSZ would join the People's Movement for the State and that it would contest the local elections in Prokuplje and Pirot with SNS. Later, in April 2024, SSZ announced that it would contest the 2024 Belgrade City Assembly election with SNS and the Socialist Party of Serbia. In this election, SSZ regained one seat in the City Assembly of Belgrade. Ristić also became a councillor, on behalf of MI–SN. Amidst the campaign, Đurđević Stamenkovski was appointed a minister in the new government of Serbia.

== Ideology and platform ==
A political coalition composed of SSZ and Dveri, far-right ultranationalist and ultraconservative parties, NO was opposed to the implementation of the proposed Ohrid Agreement. Although in opposition to the ruling Serbian Progressive Party, NO was also critical of pro-European parties and refused to cooperate with them.

At the October 2023 press conference, Obradović also declared that it is important to "preserve the domestic economy, agriculture, family, and traditional values, as well as respect for the Constitution of Serbia" (očuvanja domaće privrede i poljoprivrede, porodičnih i tradicionalnih vrednosti kao i poštovanja Ustava Srbije). Đurđević Stamenkovski said that the main vision of the bloc was to gather nationalist parties. At its second press conference in Kragujevac, the RTV Kragujevac described NO's main principles as "fighting for a sovereign, independent Serbia with a national economy, agriculture, and education" (suverena, nezavisna Srbija sa nacionalnom ekonomijom, agrarom i prosvetom). While campaigning in Valjevo, Obradović said that NO would "defend and preserve Kosovo and Metohija as part of Serbia, Republika Srpska, oppose sanctions against Russia and Serbia's membership in NATO, and protect the environment" (odbrana i očuvanje Kosova i Metohije u sastavu Srbije, Republike Srpske, ne sankcijama Rusiji i članstvu Srbije u NATO paktu, i [...] zaštiti životne sredine).

NO's campaign was largely focused on opposing the Ohrid Agreement, preserving traditional values and Kosovo as part of Serbia, supporting Republika Srpska and Serbs in neighbouring regions, and supporting ecological patriotism. Obradović, on behalf of NO, stated his support for greater incentives for domestic businessmen and farmers. NO also expressed their support for retaining close relations with China due to their positions towards Kosovo. Đurđević Stamenkovski said that NO would want Serbia to become a member of BRICS. Regarding the Belgrade election, Ristić campaigned on combating corruption, drug addiction, impurity, and revamping the public transport.

With Đurđević Stamenkovski leading the delegation, the far-right Alternative for Germany (AfD) voiced its support for NO during the delegation's visit in Germany in November 2023. The Ravna Gora Movement and Mladen Obradović of the clerical-fascist Obraz organisation also expressed their support for the coalition. In December 2023, NO organised a gathering in Belgrade, featuring far-right parties AfD, Hungarian Our Homeland Movement, and Bulgarian Revival. Đurđević Stamenkovski and Obradović met with Maria Zakharova, the spokesperson of the foreign ministry of Russia, on 1 December.

== Members ==
NO was composed of SSZ and Dveri. In the National Assembly of Serbia, SSZ had 8 members and Dveri had 6, while in the City Assembly of Belgrade, the SSZ–Dveri councillor group had 5 members.

Name	Leader	Main ideology	Political position	National Assembly (2023 election)	City Assembly of Belgrade (2023 election)
Serbian Party Oathkeepers (SSZ)	Milica Đurđević Stamenkovski	Ultranationalism	Far-right	0 / 250	0 / 110
Serbian Movement Dveri (Dveri)	Boško Obradović	Serbian nationalism	Far-right	0 / 250	0 / 110

== Electoral performance ==
=== Parliamentary elections ===
National Assembly
Year	Leader		Popular vote	% of popular vote	#	# of seats	Seat change	Status	Ref.
Year	Name	Party	Popular vote	% of popular vote	#	# of seats	Seat change	Status	Ref.
2023	Milica Đurđević Stamenkovski	SSZ	105,165	2.83%	▲6th	0 / 250	▼14	Extra-parliamentary	

=== Provincial elections ===
Assembly of Vojvodina
Year	Leader		Popular vote	% of popular vote	#	# of seats	Seat change	Status	Ref.
Year	Name	Party	Popular vote	% of popular vote	#	# of seats	Seat change	Status	Ref.
2023	Dejan Vuković	SSZ	22,487	2.36%	▲7th	0 / 120	0	Extra-parliamentary	

=== Belgrade City Assembly elections ===
City Assembly of Belgrade
Year	Leader		Popular vote	% of popular vote	#	# of seats	Seat change	Status	Ref.
Year	Name	Party	Popular vote	% of popular vote	#	# of seats	Seat change	Status	Ref.
2023	Ratko Ristić	Ind.	24,213	2.63%	▲6th	0 / 110	▼7	Extra-parliamentary	
