= Milan Đukić =

Milan Đukić may refer to:

- Milan Đukić (politician, born 1947) (1947–2007), Croatian Serb politician
- Milan Đukić (Vojvodina politician) (born 1975), Serbian politician in the province of Vojvodina
- Milan Đukić (handballer), Serbian athlete
