= Milenko Jovanov =

Serbian politician (born 1980)

- Миленко Јованов
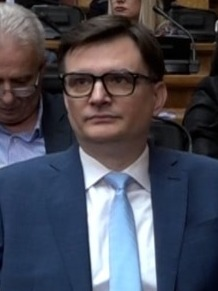

Parliamentary leader of the coalition around the Serbian Progressive Party "Serbia Must not Stop"
- Incumbent
- Assumed office 1 August 2022
- Preceded by: Aleksandar Martinović

Member of the National Assembly of the Republic of Serbia
- Incumbent
- Assumed office 3 August 2020

Member of the Assembly of Vojvodina
- In office 22 June 2012 – 31 July 2020

Provincial leader of the Democratic Party of Serbia in Vojvodina
- In office 5 April 2014 – 23 May 2015
- Preceded by: Branislav Ristivojević
- Succeeded by: Branislav Ristivojević

Personal details
- Born: 13 September 1980 (age 46) Kikinda, SR Serbia, SFR Yugoslavia
- Party: DSS (2001–2015); SNS (2015–present)
- Education: University of Belgrade

Milenko Jovanov (Миленко Јованов; born 13 September 1980) is a Serbian politician. He has been a member of the Serbian parliament since 2020 and previously served in the Vojvodina provincial assembly from 2012 to 2020.

At one time a prominent member of the Democratic Party of Serbia (DSS), Jovanov joined the Serbian Progressive Party (SNS) in 2015. Since 2022, he has been president of the SNS-led coalition's parliamentary group, recently known by the name Serbia Must Not Stop.

== Personal life ==
Jovanov was born in 1980 in Kikinda, in what was then the Socialist Autonomous Province of Vojvodina in the Socialist Republic of Serbia, Socialist Federal Republic of Yugoslavia. He holds a Bachelor of Laws degree from the University of Belgrade is also a graduate in specialist professional studies from the Faculty of Political Science at the same institution, focusing on "Political Parties and Elections."

== Politician ==
=== Democratic Party of Serbia ===
Jovanov joined the Democratic Party of Serbia in 2001.

The DSS won three seats in Kikinda in the 2008 Serbian local elections and subsequently joined a local coalition government led by the far-right Serbian Radical Party (SRS). Jovanov was not a candidate in the election but was designated as a member of the municipal council (i.e., the executive branch of the municipal government) on 3 June 2008. The Radical Party experienced a serious split later in the year, with several of its leading members – including Kikinda mayor Branislav Blažić – leaving to form the more moderate Serbian Progressive Party. The split in the Radicals caused an upheaval in the local government, and the Democratic Party (DS) formed a new administration on 17 October 2008, at which time Jovanov's tenure on the municipal council came to an end.

He received the fourth position on the DSS's electoral list in the 2012 Vojvodina provincial election and was elected to the provincial assembly when the list won four mandates. The DS and its allies won the election and afterward formed a new coalition government, while the DSS representatives served in opposition. In his first provincial term, Jovanov was a member of the committee for determining the identity of provincial regulations in languages in official use and the committee for co-operation with committees of the national assembly in exercising the competencies of the province.

Jovanov also led the DSS's list for Kikinda in the 2012 Serbian local elections, which took place concurrently with the provincial vote, and was elected to the local assembly when the list won two mandates. The DS initially formed a coalition government in the city with the Socialist Party of Serbia (SPS), and the DSS served in opposition at this level as well. A new coalition led by the SNS came to power in September 2013, and the DSS supported the administration.

Jovanov was chosen the DSS's provincial leader for Vojvodina in April 2014. He attracted some notoriety the following month for proposing "language patrols" to determine the number of settlements in which Serbian citizens of the Hungarian nationality could not speak the Serbian language.

In October 2014, Jovanov supported Sanda Rašković Ivić's successful campaign to become DSS leader and became a party vice-president at Rašković Ivić's proposal. His time in the DSS leadership did not last for long, however; he resigned from the party in May 2015, citing disagreements with its direction.

=== Serbian Progressive Party ===
Jovanov joined the Serbian Progressive Party in August 2015. He was given the eleventh position on the Progressive Party's list in the 2016 Vojvodina provincial election and was elected to a second provincial term when the list won a majority victory with sixty-three out of 120 mandates. In the term that followed, he was president of the SNS's assembly group, vice-president of the assembly's committee for the constitutional and legal status of the province, and a member of the committee on regulations.

He was also given the eleventh position on the Progressive Party's list for Kikinda in the 2016 Serbian local elections and was re-elected to the city assembly when the list won a majority victory with twenty-six out of thirty-nine seats.

Jovanov was elected as vice-president of the SNS's main board in May 2016. He did not seek re-election at either the provincial or municipal level in 2020.

==== Parliamentarian ====
Jovanov received the twenty-second position on the Progressive Party's Aleksandar Vučić — For Our Children list in the 2020 Serbian parliamentary election and was elected when the list won a landslide majority victory with 188 out of 250 seats. In the term that followed, he was a member of the assembly's committee on constitutional and legislative issues, the leader of Serbia's parliamentary friendship group with Norway, and a member of the friendship groups with Israel and Romania. His term as vice-president of the SNS main board ended in 2021.

Jovanov was given the twenty-fourth position on the SNS-led Together We Can Do Everything list in the 2022 parliamentary election and was re-elected when the list won a plurality victory with 120 seats. After the election, he was chosen as the leader of the SNS coalition's parliamentary group and was also chair of the committee on administrative, budgetary, mandate, and immunity issues.

For the 2023 parliamentary election, Jovanov was promoted to fifteenth position on the SNS's Serbia Must Not Stop list and was elected to a third term when the list won a majority victory with 129 seats. After the election, he was again chosen as leader of the SNS coalition's parliamentary group and as chair of the administrative committee.

Jovanov is now seeking re-election to the national assembly in the 2026 Serbian parliamentary election as the sixth-ranked candidate on the SNS-led United Serbia (US) electoral list.
