= Strahinja Erac =

Serbian politician

- Страхиња Ерац

Member of the National Assembly of the Republic of Serbia
- Incumbent
- Assumed office 1 August 2022

Personal details
- Born: 1994 (age 31–32)
- Party: SSZ

Strahinja Erac (Serbian Cyrillic: Страхиња Ерац; born 1994) is a Serbian politician. He was elected to the National Assembly of Serbia in 2022 as a member of the far-right Serbian Party Oathkeepers (Srpska stranka Zavetnici, SSZ).

== Private career ==
Erac is a graduated social worker from Kraljevo.

== Politician ==
Erac appeared in the twentieth position on the SSZ's electoral list in the 2016 Serbian parliamentary election. The list did not cross the electoral threshold to win representation in the assembly. In 2019, Erac was attacked and seriously injured by unknown parties in Kraljevo.

In the 2020 parliamentary election, Erac was promoted to the sixth position on the SSZ's list. He also appeared in the lead position on the party's list for Kraljevo in the concurrent 2020 Serbian local elections. The party's list missed the threshold at both levels.

=== Parliamentarian ===
Erac was again given the sixth position on the SSZ's list in the 2022 parliamentary election and was elected when the list won ten mandates. The Serbian Progressive Party (Srpska napredna stranka, SNS) and its allies won the election, and the SSZ serves in opposition. Erac is a member of the assembly's defence and internal affairs committee and a deputy member of the committee on the diaspora and Serbs in the region.
