= Serbian Party Oathkeepers =

Political party in Serbia

Serbian Party Oathkeepers Српска странка Заветници
- Abbreviation: SSZ
- President: Milica Đurđević Stamenkovski
- Founded: 15 February 2012
- Registered: 14 August 2019
- Split from: Serbian Radical Party
- Headquarters: Terazije 38, Belgrade
- Ideology: Ultranationalism; Social conservatism; Russophilia
- Political position: Far-right
- Colours: Blue
- National Assembly: 0 / 250
- Assembly of Vojvodina: 0 / 120
- City Assembly of Belgrade: 1 / 110

Website
- zavetnici.rs

The Serbian Party Oathkeepers (Serbian: Српска странка Заветници, Srpska stranka Zavetnici, abbr. SSZ), commonly known as just Oathkeepers, is a far-right political party in Serbia. Milica Đurđević Stamenkovski has been the party's president since 2021.

Initially known as Serbian Council Oathkeepers, SSZ was formed in 2012 with Stefan Stamenkovski as its first president. SSZ began its actions by organising protests against the recognition of Kosovo, the Brussels Agreement, and Belgrade Pride parades. SSZ entered electoral politics in 2013 and it participated in the 2014 parliamentary election in which it did not win any seats. They later organised protests opposed to the commemoration of Srebrenica massacre and NATO; they also organised a rally in support of convicted war criminal Ratko Mladić. SSZ unsuccessfully sought to win seats in the National Assembly of Serbia and City Assembly of Belgrade up to 2022, when SSZ for the first time gained parliamentary representation. It was in the parliamentary opposition to the Serbian Progressive Party (SNS). SSZ lost all of its representation in the 2023 elections, in which it contested as part of the National Gathering. After the elections, it aligned itself with SNS, with Đurđević Stamenkovski becoming a government minister in May 2024.

SSZ is an ultranationalist party that pursues sovereignist views towards Kosovo and supports the unification of Serbia and Republika Srpska, an entity within Bosnia and Herzegovina. It is also socially conservative and supports restricting Serbia's immigration system. SSZ supports labelling non-governmental organisations funded from abroad as "foreign agents". An Eurosceptic and anti-NATO party, it is in favour of forging closer relations with Russia and China. It is also opposed to sanctioning Russia in regards to the Russian invasion of Ukraine. SSZ has closely cooperated with United Russia, the ruling party of Russia, and has also received support from the far-right Alternative for Germany.

== History ==
=== 2012–2014 ===
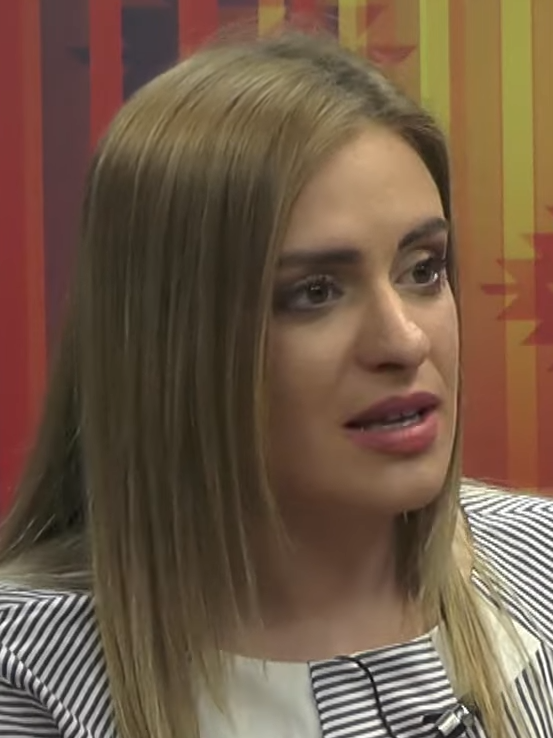
Milica Đurđević Stamenkovski was the spokesperson of SSZ until 2021, when she became the president of SSZ.

Initially, the organisation was known by names Oathkeepers of Kosovo and Metohija (Zavetnici Kosova i Metohije) and Serbian Council Oathkeepers (Srpski sabor Zavetnici, SSZ). SSZ was formed on Presentation of Jesus, 15 February 2012, by former members of the Serbian Radical Party (SRS). The association derived its name from Kosovo Myth, a national myth based on legends about the Battle of Kosovo. A day after SSZ's formation, Stefan Stamenkovski, its president, gave a speech during a protest that was organised in opposition to the recognition of Kosovo in Prague, Czech Republic, while on 17 February, the organisation was one of the organisers of a protest in Belgrade. The protest was organised by SSZ and far-right organisations such as Dveri, Obraz, SNP Naši, and 1389 Movement. Shortly before Hillary Clinton's visit to Belgrade in October 2012, SSZ again organised a protest in opposition to the recognition of Kosovo.

Beginning in April 2013, SSZ organised protests in opposition to the Brussels Agreement, the agreement that normalised relations between Serbia and Kosovo. Milica Đurđević, the spokesperson, one of the co-founders of SSZ and then a student of the University of Belgrade, said in a 2013 interview that SSZ used internet activism to spread their views and claimed that, by the time of the interview, the organisation had several thousand members. SSZ later organised a counter-protest to the Belgrade Pride parade in September 2013. Đurđević has said that the pride parades "distracted Serbs from their real social and political problems". During the process of rehabilitation of Draža Mihailović, the leader of Chetniks during the World War II, a group of its members protested in front of the building of the Higher Court in Belgrade in December 2013. In the same month, SSZ contested its first election, the local election in Voždovac, with Dveri. Đurđević was one of the candidates on the electoral list. The list did not win any seats in the City Assembly of Voždovac.

SSZ celebrated its two years of existence in the Russian House, Belgrade. In March 2014 it contested the parliamentary election with Borislav Pelević's Council of Serbian Unity, as part of the Patriotic Front. Đurđević was the representative of the electoral list. The list did not win any seats in the National Assembly of Serbia. In the same month, SSZ came in support of activist Radomir Počuča, who called for members of the Women in Black organisation to be lynched. On Vidovdan (28 June), SSZ members held a public performance in Sarajevo, holding a banner that had "Serbian Princip lives forever" (Srpski Princip zauvek živi) written on it; this caused controversy in the Federation of Bosnia and Herzegovina. Later in November 2014, SSZ organised a counter-protest to a gathering organised by the Women in Black, who commemorated the end of the Battle of Vukovar.

=== 2015–2017 ===
SSZ organised an exhibition in Belgrade in June 2015 named "British genocidal policy" (Britanska genocidna politika) that showed "photographs of United Kingdom's war crimes from the end of the 19th century to the present day" (fotografije ratnih zločina Velike Britanije od kraja 19. veka do današnjih dana). A month later, it organised a counter-protest to the commemoration of the Srebrenica massacre; SSZ repeated this in 2017. SSZ denies the Srebrenica massacre. Together with Obraz, it organised an anti-NATO protest in February 2016 which was participated by several thousand demonstrators. A month later it again organised a protest against Serbia's cooperation with the NATO Support and Procurement Agency. Đurđević described the cooperation between Serbia and NATO as "disrespectful to the Serbian people".

SSZ contested both the parliamentary election and Vojvodina provincial election in April 2016. Božidar Zečević, a playwright, was the representative of the list for the parliamentary election while Đurđević was featured second on its electoral list. SSZ campaigned on forging closer relations with Russia while being opposed to cooperation with NATO and the European Union. During the campaign period, SSZ has received the least attention, according to non-governmental organisation CRTA. It won 0.7 percent of the popular vote and no seats in the National Assembly.

In 2017, members of SSZ interrupted a projection of a documentary film, a festival, and a book promotion. They deemed them as "harmful to the state" (štetnim za državu) and have called the organisers "traitors" (izdajnici). In July 2017, SSZ organised a rally in support of convicted war criminal Ratko Mladić, claiming that "Mladić liberated Srebrenica". Đurđević married Stamenkovski in September 2017.

=== 2018–2020 ===
SSZ took part in the Belgrade City Assembly election in March 2018; it began campaigning in late January. It campaigned on building a memorial building for Dragutin Gavrilović, giving Mirijevo the status of a municipality, criticising non-governmental organisations, whom they labelled "foreign mercenaries" (strani plaćenici), and arranging Belgrade's river banks and piers. It won 0.65 percent of the popular vote. Following the election, its members unsuccessfully tried to stop the projection of a movie titled Kosovo... Nazdravlje! Gezuar! (Kosovo... Cheers!). Later in May 2018, SSZ organised a counter-protest to the Mirëdita, dobar dan! (Good Day!) festival with the SRS. Đurđević Stamenkovski has accused the festival organisers of "treating Kosovo as an independent state" (Kosovo tretira kao nezavisna država).

SSZ again organised a counter-protest during the Mirëdita, dobar dan! festival in 2019 and 2020. On 14 August 2019, SSZ registered itself as a political party under the name Serbian Party Oathkeepers. N1 news channel reported allegations that members of the Serbian Progressive Party (SNS) were one of the signatories while SSZ was collecting signatures to become a political party. Later in December 2019, it organised a protest in support of the ongoing clerical protests in Montenegro.

Initially, parliamentary elections were to be held in April 2020, however, the election was postponed to June 2020 due to the COVID-19 pandemic. The Republic Electoral Commission accepted the SSZ electoral list in May 2020. Zoran Zečević was featured first on the list, while Đurđević Stamenkovski was featured second. Political scientist Boban Stojanović accused SNS of helping SSZ to collect signatures for its electoral list. SSZ did not cross the 3 percent electoral threshold to gain representation in the National Assembly. After the elections, Đurđević Stamenkovski criticised those who boycotted the election.

=== 2021–2023 ===
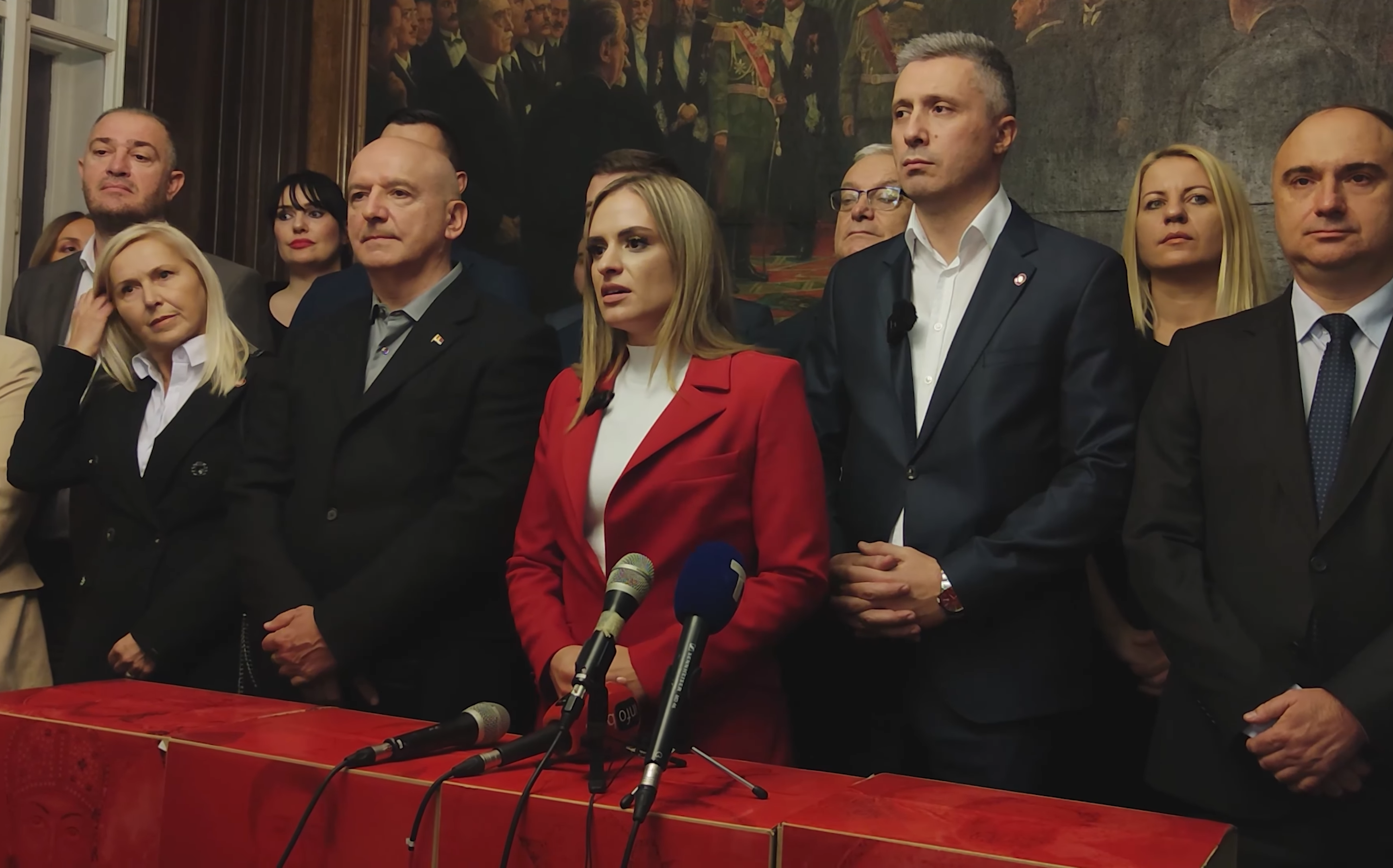
SSZ and Dveri (president Boško Obradović to the right of Đurđević Stamenkovski) failed to obtain any representation in the 2023 elections while participating in the National Gathering coalition.

SSZ signed a cooperation agreement with Vladan Glišić's National Network in February 2021, due to their sharing support for sovereignitism. Beginning in May 2021, inter-party dialogues on electoral conditions without the presence of delegators from the European Union began. SSZ was one of the parties that took part in the dialogues. An agreement between the government and parties that participated in the dialogues was reached in October 2021. In the same month, Đurđević Stamenkovski became the president of SSZ. While the dialogues were still ongoing, SSZ members interrupted the presentation of Svetislav Basara's book in August 2021, criticising his personal views whom they labelled as "anti-Serbian". Later in December 2021, SSZ started campaigning against the proposed changes that were voted in the constitutional referendum in January 2022. A majority of voters that took part in the voting voted in favour of the changes. Following the referendum, SSZ took part in a protest where they demanded the results to be annulled.

SSZ announced its participation in the 2022 general elections in February 2022; Đurđević Stamenkovski was presented as its presidential candidate. It also participated in the Belgrade City Assembly election. During the campaign period, SSZ has stated its opposition to introducing sanctions on Russia while Đurđević Stamenkovski criticised the European Union and NATO. In the presidential election, Đurđević Stamenkovski won 4.3 percent of the popular vote while SSZ won 10 seats in the National Assembly. Additionally, SSZ gained representation in the City Assembly of Belgrade, with four seats in total. After the elections, SSZ took part in the government negotiations but refused to join the incoming government due to ideological differences, opting to go into the parliamentary opposition.

Two members of the National Assembly and two members of the City Assembly of Belgrade left SSZ in October 2022, criticising Đurđević Stamenkovski and other SSZ members of the National Assembly. SSZ later demanded them to return their mandates. These members joined SNS in February 2023. In March 2023, SSZ was one of the organisers of a protest opposed to the agreement on the path to normalisation between Kosovo and Serbia. It has expressed its opposition to the Serbia Against Violence protests, which began after the Belgrade school shooting and Mladenovac and Smederevo shootings in May 2023.

Together with Dveri, SSZ formed a joint councillor group inside the City Assembly of Belgrade in September 2023, while a month later, they formed the National Gathering coalition. Miloš Ković, a historian and professor at the Faculty of Philosophy of University of Belgrade, was also one of the initiators; Dveri and SSZ also invited the People's Party (Narodna) and member parties of the National Democratic Alternative to join the coalition. Further talks were held in late October 2023, however, Stefan Stamenkovski, on behalf of SSZ, rejected the proposed document, thus not reaching an agreement on joint participation in the 2023 parliamentary election.

In early November 2023, Dragan Nikolić, one of the vice-presidents of SSZ and its member in the National Assembly, left the party and re-joined SNS. The National Gathering coalition also announced Ratko Ristić as their candidate for the 2023 Belgrade City Assembly election. Their electoral lists for the parliamentary and Belgrade City Assembly election lists were accepted on 5 and 13 November respectively. On 27 November, their electoral list for the 2023 Vojvodina provincial election was accepted too. SSZ lost all of its representation in the National Assembly and City Assembly of Belgrade, as the National Gathering coalition failed to cross the threshold. The National Gathering coalition was dissolved shortly afterwards the election.

=== 2024–present ===
Following the 2023 elections, SSZ participated in talks with SNS about joining the People's Movement for the State. On local level, it also aligned itself with SNS in municipalities such as Prokuplje and Pirot. In April 2024, it was announced that SSZ would run on the joint list led by SNS and Socialist Party of Serbia for the 2024 Belgrade City Assembly election. Amidst the campaign, Đurđević Stamenkovski became the minister of family welfare and demography in the government led by SNS in May 2024. The Belgrade City Assembly election resulted in SSZ gaining one seat from the joint list.

SSZ again stated its opposition to the Mirëdita, dobar dan! festival in June 2024, with Đurđević Stamenkovski alleging that the festival undermines the constitution of Serbia. The Ministry of Internal Affairs then banned the festival from taking place.

SSZ did not run its own list in the 2026 parliamentary election; in July 2026, Đurđević Stamenkovski announced the party's support for the SNS-led list "Aleksandar Vučić – United Serbia", describing it as "a bulwark against attacks on the state". The list lost the election to the Student List.

== Ideology and platform ==
Đurđević Stamenkovski said in a 2013 interview that SSZ is in favour of strengthening relations with Russia while being opposed to the accession of Serbia to the European Union. Sonja Biserko, the president of the Helsinki Committee for Human Rights in Serbia, has described SSZ as pro-fascistic. Political scientist Věra Stojarová has described SSZ as a radical ethno-nationalist party due to them declaratively rejecting fascism. The late University of Sarajevo professor Samir Beglerović described SSZ as neo-fascist.

On the political spectrum, SSZ is positioned on the far-right. It has been also described as a radical right party, and a proponent of populist and anti-globalist rhetoric. The party views itself as patriotic, however observers have described SSZ as ultranationalist. Đurđević Stamenkovski has rejected that SSZ promotes hate, instead claiming that non-governmental organisations are "anti-Serbian" due to allegedly "ignoring Serbian victims of Balkan atrocities committed during the [Yugoslav Wars]". SSZ supports introducing a law that would label non-governmental organisations funded from abroad as "foreign agents". SSZ has spread misinformation in regards to the origin of the COVID-19 virus.

SSZ is a socially conservative, traditionalist, and religious conservative party. Regarding social issues, Dušan Spasojević, a professor at the Faculty of Political Sciences of University of Belgrade, has placed SSZ on the far-right. SSZ supports family values, and the introduction of a law like the Russian anti-gay law in Serbia. In a television interview, Đurđević Stamenkovski has once said "What is the plus in the LGBT+, zoophiles and pedophiles maybe? You will also ask for the rights of pedophiles". In 2022, it opposed the manifestation of the EuroPride event in Belgrade. SSZ is not opposed to making abortions illegal and instead wants to "raise awareness among women" to lower the number of unwanted pregnancies. Đurđević Stamenkovski has, however, falsely claimed that 100,000 abortions are performed every year in Serbia. According to the statistics of the Institute for Public Health "Dr Milan Jovanović Batut", only 11,000 abortions were performed in 2022.

Regarding immigration, it supports changing the current immigration system. It is supportive of increased transparency in regards to how many people in migrant centres expressed their desire to stay in Serbia and building a barrier, similar to Hungarian border barrier, in case of a heavy migrant crisis. SSZ has described the migrant centre near Horgoš as "one of the most serious risks for citizens of Serbia" (jedan od najozbiljnijih rizika za građane Srbije).

SSZ is a Eurosceptic party that is in favour of suspending the accession of Serbia to the European Union. It is instead in favour of sovereignist "Europe of Nations" (Evropu nacija) policy. SSZ supports Serbia's membership in BRICS as an alternative to the European Union. It is also opposed to NATO and instead wants to pursue closer ties with Russia, and China. SSZ is supportive of Vladimir Putin. After the beginning of the Russian invasion of Ukraine, SSZ has opposed sanctioning Russia. After the death of Russian activist Darya Dugina in September 2022, members of SSZ drew a mural of her in Belgrade.

SSZ pursues a sovereignist policy towards Kosovo, opposing its recognition as an independent country. SSZ is also opposed to the 2013 Brussels Agreement and is in favour of repealing it and bringing back the Serbian Army to Kosovo. It has supported the initiative to repopulate Kosovo with Serbs with kibbutz-style settlements. Together with Dveri, Narodna, and New Democratic Party of Serbia, it signed a joint declaration for the "reintegration of Kosovo into the constitutional and legal order of Serbia" (Deklaraiju za reintegraciju KiM u ustavno-pravni poredak Srbije) in October 2022. SSZ supports the unification of Serbia and Republika Srpska and denies that a genocide had been committed on Bosniaks in Srebrenica.

== Organisation ==
SSZ has been led by Đurđević Stamenkovski since 28 October 2021. Its headquarters is located at Terazije 38, Stari Grad, Belgrade. SSZ was registered as an association in the Agency of Private Registers in September 2012 with Stefan Stamenkovski as its representative. Since May 2023, the association has been in liquidation.

Within the organisation, Đurđević Stamenkovski also served as the president of the party's parliamentary group in the National Assembly during its time in the National Assembly. Dragan Nikolić and Strahinja Erac formerly served as the vice-presidents of the party.

In a 2017 interview, Đurđević Stamenkovski said that SSZ had 25,000 members. SSZ has used the White Angel and Miloš Obilić on its emblem, while on its coat of arms it has used a shield that dates from the period of the Nemanjić dynasty.

=== International cooperation ===
Members of SSZ, including Đurđević Stamenkovski, met with Sergey Lavrov, the minister of foreign affairs of Russia, in 2016. In the same year, SSZ established connection with United Russia, the ruling party of Russia. A year later, its members met with representatives of United Russia in Moscow. Since then, SSZ has retained close relations with United Russia. In December 2023, the youth representatives of SSZ met with A Just Russia – For Truth youth representatives.

In September 2023, Đurđević Stamenkovski hosted a delegation from S.O.S. Romania, including leader Diana Iovanovici-Șoșoacă, and signed a statement of cooperation between the parties.

Đurđević Stamenkovski met with Tino Chrupalla, the co-leader of the far-right Alternative for Germany (AfD) political party, in November 2023; she described AfD as the "leading sovereignist and state-building option in Germany". AfD expressed its support for the SSZ–Dveri coalition and it is also opposed to the recognition of Kosovo. A month later, SSZ and Dveri organised another gathering featuring far-right parties AfD, Hungarian Our Homeland Movement, and Bulgarian Revival. In April 2024, SSZ signed the Sofia Declaration with Revival, Our Homeland Movement, Slovak Republic, Dutch Forum for Democracy, the Swiss Mass Voll, Alternative for Sweden, the Moldovan Revival Party, and the Agricultural Livestock Party of Greece. Đurđević Stamenkovski participated in AfD's campaign for the 2025 German federal election.

In February 2025, Đurđević Stamenkovski spoke at a rally in support of President of Republika Srpska Milorad Dodik in Banja Luka.

=== List of presidents ===
| # | President | | Birth–Death | Term start | Term end |
|---|---|---|---|---|---|
| 1 | Stefan Stamenkovski | | 1982– | 15 February 2012 | 28 October 2021 |
| 2 | Milica Đurđević; Stamenkovski | A photo of Milica Đurđević Stamenkovski in 2022 | 1990– | 28 October 2021 | Incumbent |

== Electoral performance ==
=== Parliamentary elections ===
National Assembly of Serbia
| Year | Leader | Popular vote | % of popular vote | # | # of seats | Seat change | Coalition | Status | Ref. |
|---|---|---|---|---|---|---|---|---|---|
| 2012 | Stefan Stamenkovski | Did not participate | | | 0 / 250 | 0 | – | Extra-parliamentary | – |
| 2014 | Stefan Stamenkovski | 4,514 | 0.13% | ▲17th | 0 / 250 | 0 | Patriotic Front | Extra-parliamentary | |
| 2016 | Stefan Stamenkovski | 27,690 | 0.73% | ▲12th | 0 / 250 | 0 | – | Extra-parliamentary | |
| 2020 | Stefan Stamenkovski | 45,950 | 1.43% | ▲10th | 0 / 250 | 0 | – | Extra-parliamentary | |
| 2022 | Milica Đurđević; Stamenkovski | 141,227 | 3.82% | ▲7th | 10 / 250 | ▲10 | – | Opposition | |
| 2023 | Milica Đurđević; Stamenkovski | 105,165 | 2.83% | ▲6th | 0 / 250 | ▼10 | NO | Government (Note: The SSZ won no parliamentary representation, but joined the government after the election.) | |
| 2026 | Milica Đurđević; Stamenkovski | Did not participate | | | 0 / 250 | 0 | Supported US | Extra-parliamentary | |

=== Presidential elections ===
President of Serbia
| Year | Candidate | 1st round popular vote | | % of popular vote | 2nd round popular vote | | % of popular vote | Ref. |
|---|---|---|---|---|---|---|---|---|
| 2012 | Did not participate | | | | | | | – |
| 2017 | Did not participate | | | | | | | – |
| 2022 | Milica Đurđević Stamenkovski | 5th | 160,553 | 4.33% | —N/a | — | — | |

=== Belgrade City Assembly elections ===
City Assembly of Belgrade
| Year | Leader | Popular vote | % of popular vote | # | # of seats | Seat change | Coalition | Status | Ref. |
|---|---|---|---|---|---|---|---|---|---|
| 2012 | Stefan Stamenkovski | Did not participate | | | 0 / 110 | 0 | – | Non-parliamentary | – |
| 2014 | Stefan Stamenkovski | 996 | 0.12% | ▲18th | 0 / 110 | 0 | Patriotic Front | Non-parliamentary | |
| 2018 | Stefan Stamenkovski | 5,301 | 0.65% | ▲11th | 0 / 110 | 0 | – | Non-parliamentary | |
| 2022 | Milica Đurđević; Stamenkovski | 32,029 | 3.57% | ▲6th | 4 / 110 | ▲4 | – | Opposition | |
| 2023 | Milica Đurđević; Stamenkovski | 24,213 | 2.63% | 6th | 0 / 110 | ▼4 | NO | Extra-parliamentary | |
| 2024 | Milica Đurđević; Stamenkovski | 366,345 | 52.80% | ▲1st | 1 / 110 | ▲1 | BS | Government | |
