= Damir Zobenica =

Serbian politician

- Дамир Зобеница

Vice-president of the Assembly of Vojvodina
- In office June 2, 2016 – December 13, 2024
- President: István Pásztor; Bálint Juhász

Deputy in the Assembly of Vojvodina
- In office June 22, 2012 – December 13, 2024
- President: István Pásztor; Bálint Juhász

Personal details
- Born: April 15, 1981 (age 44), Pula, Croatia, SFR Yugoslavia
- Party: Serbian Progressive Party
- Education: University of Novi Sad

Damir Zobenica (Serbian Cyrillic: Дамир Зобеница; born April 15, 1981) is a Serbian politician in who has served in the Assembly of Vojvodina from 2012 to 2024 and has been a vice-president of the Assembly from 2016 to 2024. Zobenica is a member of the Serbian Progressive Party.

== Early life and career ==
Zobenica was born in Pula, in what was then the Socialist Republic of Croatia in the Socialist Federal Republic of Yugoslavia. He completed grammar school in Novi Sad and graduated from the University of Novi Sad Faculty of Philosophy in 2008 with a sociology degree.

== Politician ==
Zobenica joined the Progressive Party upon its founding in 2008. The following year, he was elected as the president of its local board in Sremska Kamenica.

He received the seventh position on the Progressive Party's electoral list for the Novi Sad municipal assembly in the 2012 Serbian local elections and was elected when the list won fifteen mandates. The Democratic Party and its allies initially formed a coalition government at the municipal level in Novi Sad, and Zobenica served as a member of the opposition. The Progressives and their allies formed a new administration in October 2012 following a shift in local alliances, and he served as advisor to the mayor between 2012 and 2016.

=== Member of the provincial assembly ===
Zobenica was elected to his first term in the Vojvodina assembly in the 2012 provincial election, winning Novi Sad's first constituency seat. The election was won by the Democratic Party and its allies, and the Progressives served in opposition for the next four years.

Vojvodina switched to a system of full proportional representation for the 2016 provincial election, and Zobenica was given the third position on the Progressive Party's list. This was tantamount to election, and he was indeed re-elected when the list won a majority with 63 out of 120 seats. He was chosen as a vice-president of the assembly following the election and held this role for the next four years.

Zobenica also became active with the Assembly of European Regions during this time, serving as vice-president of Committee 1 (dealing with economic and regional economic cooperation issues) in 2016–17. He subsequently became vice-president of the assembly in charge of diplomacy and Black Sea cooperation in 2017–19 and vice-president in charge of regional economic development beginning in 2019.

He was given the second position on the Progressive Party's list in the 2020 provincial election and was elected to a third term when the list won an increased majority with seventy-six seats. He was confirmed for another term as vice-president of the assembly after the election, and he serves as a member of the committee on European integration and interregional cooperation and the committee on administrative and mandatory issues. He has also continued to participate in Serbia's delegation to the Assembly of European Regions.

In November 2024, during protests following the collapse of the canopy at the Novi Sad Railway Station, Zobenica was accused by Member of Parliament Marinka Tepić of organizing SNS activists during the clashes at the protest, releasing an audio recording of the orders. Serbian President Aleksandar Vučić commented on these claims, stating that Zobenica denied this and claimed the audio was made using artificial intelligence. Sound engineer Dejan Tomka stated that it is impossible to create the sound in the recording using artificial intelligence. On December 13, 2024, Zobenica resigned from his position as Vice President of the Assembly of Vojvodina. A criminal complaint was filed against him, but it was dismissed because "it was determined that the reported act is not a criminal offense prosecuted ex officio."

== Electoral record ==
=== Provincial (Vojvodina) ===
2012 Vojvodina assembly election Novi Sad I (constituency seat) - First and Second Rounds
Damir Zobenica	Let's Get Vojvodina Moving (Affiliation: Progressive Party)	6,711	27.49	11,438	52.36
Slobodan Kačar	Choice for a Better Vojvodina	4,554	18.65	10,407	47.64
Milan Balać	Democratic Party of Serbia	2,917	11.95		
Lazar Kanjerić	Serbian Radical Party	2,429	9.95		
Vasilije Topalov	Socialist Party of Serbia–Party of United Pensioners of Serbia–United Serbia–Social Democratic Party of Serbia	2,321	9.51		
Damir Kondić	League of Social Democrats of Vojvodina	2,295	9.40		
Milica Jovanov Banić	Preokret	1,039	4.26		
Marko Radaković	Maja Gojković–United Regions of Serbia	909	3.72		
Milorad Ćitić	Serb Democratic Party	678	2.78		
Drago Stupar	Citizens' Group – Vote for Yourself	563	2.31		
Total valid votes		24,416	100	21,845	100
