= RTV Kragujevac =

Radio Television Kragujevac
- Country: Serbia

Ownership
- Owner: RTKG

History
- Launched: 1994

Links
- Website: www.rtk.co.rs

Radio Television Kragujevac (RTV Kragujevac; Serbian: Радио Телевизија Крагујевац (РТВ Крагујевац) / Radio Televizija Kragujevac) is only one local television station in Kragujevac, Serbia and one of three regional television stations in Šumadija and Pomoravlje Region. They are trying to become not only commercial but educational stations too. They can be received in a wide region of central Serbia.
