= Đurađ Jakšić =

Serbian history professor and politician

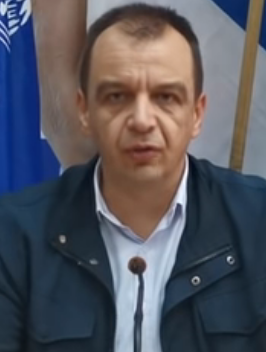

Personal details
- Born: 22 July 1977 (age 49) Drniš, SFR Yugoslavia
- Party: Serbian Radical Party
- Relations: Married
- Children: Four
- Education: University of Novi Sad
- Occupation: Politician

Đurađ Jakšić (Serbian Cyrillic: Ђурађ Јакшић, pronounced [dʑǔradʑ jǎkʃitɕ]; born 22 July 1977) is a Serbian historian and politician.

== Career ==
He ran for mayor of Novi Sad in the 2012 and 2016 mayoral elections. Jakšić is the Serbian Radical Party president of the city council of Novi Sad.

In December 2012, he sparked controversy by forming a petition requesting that a street in Novi Sad be named after Slobodan Milošević. He previously sparked controversy in March 2007 when he suggested that Veljko Milanković and Mladen Bratić have streets named after them in Novi Sad.
