= Milan Đukić (Vojvodina politician) =

Milan Đukić (Serbian Cyrillic: Милан Ђукић; born 11 March 1975) is a politician in Serbia, currently serving his second term in the Assembly of Vojvodina. Đukić is a member of the Serbian Renewal Movement (Srpski pokret obnove, SPO).

== Private career ==
Đukić is a lawyer. He lives in Novi Sad.

== Politician ==
The SPO contested the 2008 Vojvodina provincial election as part of the For a European Vojvodina alliance led by the Democratic Party (Demokratska stranka, DS). Đukić received the twenty-fourth position on the alliance's electoral list and was awarded a mandate after the list won twenty-three seats. (From 2000 to 2011, mandates in Serbian elections held under proportional representation were awarded to parties or coalitions rather than individual candidates, and it was common practice for the mandates to be assigned out of numerical order. Đukić's list position had no specific bearing on whether or not he received a mandate.) For a European Vojvodina won a majority of seats in the election, and Đukić served as a government supporter for the next four years.

On 18 September 2009, he was also appointed to the Novi Sad city council (i.e., the executive branch of the municipal government) with responsibility of education. He resigned from this position in September 2011, following a reform that prevented him from holding a dual mandate as a city councillor and assembly member.

In late 2011, he and prominent Vojvodina politicians took part in the removal of hate speech graffiti from buildings near the Novi Sad police department.

Serbia's electoral law was reformed in 2011, such that assembly mandates were awarded in numerical order to candidates on successful lists. For the 2012 provincial election, the SPO joined a coalition known as Preokret (English: U-Turn), and Đukić was given the fourth position on their list. The list narrowly missed crossing the electoral threshold to win representation in the assembly.

As he was no longer a member of the provincial assembly and was not in a conflict-of-interest situation, Đukić rejoined the Novi Sad city council on 29 June 2012 with responsibility for social and child protection. His term in office was brief; he resigned on 27 August 2012, after the SPO left the city's coalition government and announced a new partnership with the Serbian Progressive Party (Srpska napredna stranka, SNS). In resigning, Đukić said that he would not rejoin council even if the SPO became part of a new civic administration, although he clarified that he would not leave the party.

There was a serious split in the SPO in 2017, wherein several dissidents left to form a new party called the Movement for the Restoration of the Kingdom of Serbia (Pokret obnove Kraljevine Srbije, POKS). The POKS was led by Žika Gojković, who had hitherto been the SPO's provincial leader in Vojvodina; all three SPO members of the provincial assembly also joined the new organization. Đukić was one of the more prominent SPO members in Vojvodina to remain with the party.

The SPO contested the 2020 provincial election as part of the SNS's Aleksandar Vučić — For Our Children coalition. Đukić was the sole SPO candidate on the coalition's list, appearing in the fifty-first position; he was elected to a second term when the list won a majority victory with seventy-six of 120 mandates. He is now a member of the committee on issues of the constitutional and legal status of the province and the committee on petitions and motions.

Đukić is a member of the SPO presidency.
