= Branislav Ristivojević =

Serbian politician

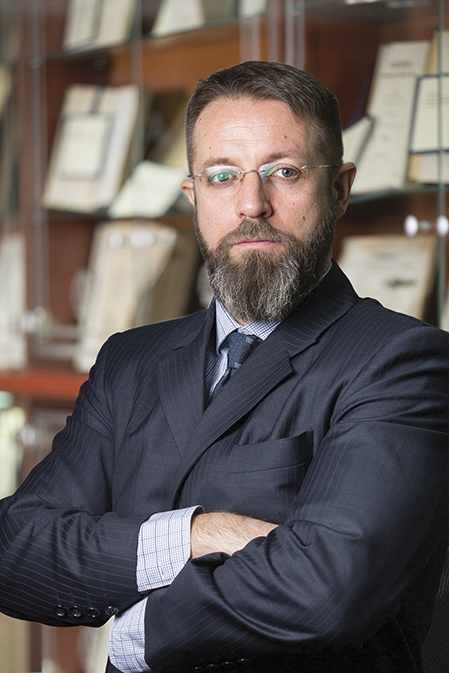

Branislav Ristivojević (Serbian Cyrillic: Бранислав Ристивојевић; born 10 October 1972) is an academic and politician in Serbia. He was a member of the National Assembly of Serbia in 2004 and is currently serving his second term as a member of the Assembly of Vojvodina. Ristivojević is a member of the Democratic Party of Serbia (Demokratska stranka Srbije, DSS).

== Early life and academic career ==
Ristivojević was born in Novi Sad, in what was then the Socialist Republic of Serbia in the Socialist Federal Republic of Yugoslavia. He received a Bachelor of Laws degree from the University of Novi Sad in 1996 and subsequently earned a Master of Laws degree from the same institution. In 2006, he received in Ph.D from the University of Belgrade Faculty of Law for a thesis entitled, "Crimes Against Humanity from the Point of View of Criminal Law." He became an assistant professor at the University of Novi Sad in 2007, an associate professor in 2012, and a full professor in 2017. He is the head of the department of criminal law and a dean of the faculty of law.

Ristivojević has written four books and numerous articles on the subject of criminal law. He was an expert witness in several cases at the International Criminal Tribunal for the Former Yugoslavia (ICTY) and has participated in four international conferences, in Riga, Athens, Amsterdam, and Sarajevo.

In May 2018, Ristivojević was convicted in civil court of discrimination against women and LGBT people, on the basis of an article he had written entitled, "Nasilje u porodici i nasilje nad porodicom." The conviction was overturned on appeal in August 2020.

== Politician ==
=== Parliamentarian and government advisor ===
Ristivojević received the thirty-third position on the DSS's electoral list in the 2003 Serbian parliamentary election. The list won fifty-three mandates, and he was included in the party's delegation when the assembly met in early 2004. (From 2000 to 2011, mandates in Serbian elections were awarded to successful parties and coalitions rather than individual candidates, and it was common practice for the mandates to be assigned out of numerical order. Ristivojević did not automatically receive a mandate by virtue of his list position.) The DSS became the dominant force in Serbia's coalition government after the election, and Ristivojević served with its parliamentary majority. During his time in parliament, he chaired the legislative committee and the judiciary committee. He resigned from the assembly on 13 July 2004; fellow DSS MP Miloš Aligrudić indicated that he did so because of other obligations.

Ristivojević was an advisor to Serbian prime minister Vojislav Koštunica on legal issues from 2007 to 2008 and was a media spokesperson for the DSS in the same period. He threatened that Serbia would sue the United States of America in February 2008, after the American government recognised Kosovo as independent.

He appeared on the coalition electoral lists of the DSS and New Serbia in the 2007 and 2008 parliamentary elections, though he was not selected for a mandate on either occasion.

=== Municipal politics ===
Ristivojević appeared in the lead position on the DSS–New Serbia list for the Novi Sad city assembly in the 2008 Serbian local elections and was selected for a mandate when the list won five seats. He did not seek re-election in 2012. He was included on the party's METLA 2020 list in the 2020 local elections in the largely ceremonial twenty-sixth position (out of twenty-six) and was not elected when the list won three seats.

=== Provincial politics ===
Ristivojević appeared in the seventh position on the DSS-New Serbia list in the 2008 Vojvodina provincial election. The list won four mandates, and he was not included in its assembly delegation.

Serbia's electoral system was reformed in 2011, such that assembly mandates were awarded in numerical order to candidates on successful lists. Ristivojević received the second position on the DSS's list in the 2012 provincial election was elected when the list won four mandates. The Democratic Party (Demokratska stranka, DS) and its allies won the election, and the DSS served in opposition.

The DSS formed an electoral alliance with Dveri in early 2016. Ristivojević received the second position on the alliance's list in the 2016 provincial election and was not re-elected when the list fell below the electoral threshold for representation in the assembly. He also received the 237th position (out of 240) on the alliance's list in the 2016 Serbian parliamentary election. This was too low a position for election to be a realistic prospect, and indeed he was not returned when the list won thirteen mandates at the republic level.

The DSS led the METLA 2020 alliance in the 2020 provincial election; Ristivojević appeared in the lead position on its list and was elected to a second term at the provincial level when the list won five mandates. The election was won by the Progressive Party and its allies, and the DSS once again serves in opposition. One of the other candidates elected on the METLA list subsequently joined the parliamentary group of the Progressive Party, and, as five members are needed for a parliamentary group, the DSS/METLA group ceased to exist at this time. Ristivojević is now a member of the committee on security and the committee on organisation of administration and local self-government.

He also appeared in the thirty-third position the METLA 2020 list in the 2020 Serbian parliamentary election, which was held concurrently with the provincial and municipal elections. The list failed to cross the electoral threshold.
