= Serbian Progressive Party =

Political party in Serbia

Serbian Progressive Party Српска напредна странка
- Abbreviation: SNS
- President: Miloš Vučević
- De facto leader: Aleksandar Vučić
- Vice-Presidents: See list: Aleksandar Šapić; Ana Brnabić; Marko Đurić; Nevena Đurić; Irena Vujović; Siniša Mali; Vladimir Orlić
- Founder: Aleksandar Vučić; Tomislav Nikolić
- Founded: 8 September 2008; 18 years ago
- Registered: 10 October 2008; 18 years ago
- Split from: Serbian Radical Party
- Headquarters: Palmira Toljatija 5/3, Belgrade
- Newspaper: SNS Informator
- Youth wing: Youth Union
- Women's wing: Women Union
- Membership (2024): 700,000+
- Ideology: Populism; Nationalist populism; Serbian nationalism; Illiberalism; Neoliberalism
- Political position: Centre to far-right (Note: Political scientists describe SNS as a catch-all party driven by a pragmatic rather than ideological approach and seeking to appeal to as broad an electorate as possible. Narrower assessments have placed it in the centre, on the centre-right or on the right, or also on the far-right.)
- National affiliation: United Serbia
- European affiliation: European People's Party (associate)
- International affiliation: International Democracy Union
- Colours: Blue
- National Assembly: 92 / 250 (Note: The Republic Electoral Commission does not publish candidates' party affiliations, and the National Assembly records all 103 deputies of the "Aleksandar Vučić – United Serbia" list as elected on the proposal of the SNS. The figure is the list total minus the 11 deputies of partner parties and the four independents Stojan Radenović, Jovan Kolundžija, Branislav Lečić and Dejan Bulatović, and may include other non-party candidates. It includes Marko Korać, who is not a member of the parliamentary group.)
- Assembly of Vojvodina: 59 / 120
- City Assembly of Belgrade: 45 / 110

Party flag

Website
- sns.org.rs

The Serbian Progressive Party (Serbian: Српска напредна странка, romanised: Srpska napredna stranka, abbr. SNS) is a major political party in Serbia. Founded in 2008, it led the government of Serbia from 2012 until its defeat in the 2026 parliamentary election. Political scientists most commonly describe it as populist and a catch-all party; it has also been described as nationalist, and has been placed variously from the centre to the right. Miloš Vučević, a former prime minister of Serbia, has been its president since 2023, although Aleksandar Vučić is widely regarded as its de facto leader.

Founded by Vučić and Tomislav Nikolić in 2008 as a split from the far-right Serbian Radical Party, SNS served in opposition to the Democratic Party until 2012. SNS gained prominence and became the largest opposition party due to their anti-corruption platform and the protests in 2011, at which they demanded early elections. In 2012, Nikolić was elected president of Serbia, succeeded in turn by Vučić as president of SNS. A coalition government led by SNS and Socialist Party of Serbia (SPS) was also formed. Vučić became prime minister in 2014 while SNS became the largest party in Belgrade and Vojvodina in 2014 and 2016, respectively. Observers have assessed that after the party came to power, Serbia suffered democratic backsliding into authoritarianism, as well as a decline in media freedom and civil liberties.

SNS chose Vučić as their presidential candidate for the 2017 election, which he ultimately won. Mass protests were organised following his election, while Ana Brnabić, an independent who later joined SNS, succeeded him as prime minister. SNS was later faced with protests from 2018 to 2020 and gained a supermajority of seats in the National Assembly of Serbia after the 2020 election, which was boycotted by most opposition parties. The Serbian Patriotic Alliance merged into SNS in 2021 while environmental protests were also organised in 2021 and 2022. Vučić was re-elected as president in 2022, while SNS continued to lead the government with SPS. A year later, Vučić was formally succeeded by Vučević as president of SNS, who led the party in the 2023 parliamentary election, while Vučić retained de facto control over the party. By 2024, SNS had at least 700,000 members, making it one of the largest political parties by membership in Europe. From late 2024, SNS faced student-led anti-corruption protests. In September 2026, Vučić resigned as president to head the SNS-led list in the snap parliamentary election, with Brnabić becoming acting president. In the election, held on 25 October 2026, the list won 103 of the 250 seats and was defeated by the Student List, which won an absolute majority; Vučić conceded defeat and said that SNS would go into opposition after 14 years in power. On 31 October, the party's main board called an extraordinary assembly for 13 December, at which Vučević said he would propose Vučić as party president.

Political scientists have most commonly described SNS as a populist and catch-all party with a weak or flexible ideological profile and a pragmatic rather than ideological approach. It has also been described as nationalist, especially in later years, and scholars have characterised its rule as illiberal, nationalist-populist and authoritarian, often comparing it to that of Viktor Orbán's Fidesz in Hungary; at the same time, it is noted that the party that presents itself as a moderate, stabilising force. SNS officially supports Serbia's accession to the European Union. An economically neoliberal party, SNS has pushed for austerity, market economy reforms, privatisation, economic liberalisation, and has reformed wages, pensions, the labour law, introduced a lex specialis for Belgrade Waterfront, and reformed the Constitution in the part related to judiciary. SNS is an associated member of the European People's Party and a member of the International Democracy Union.

== History ==
=== Formation ===
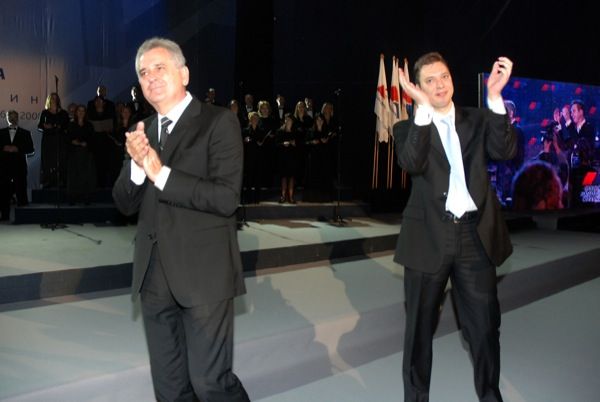
Tomislav Nikolić and Aleksandar Vučić at the founding convention on 21 October 2008

The conflict between Tomislav Nikolić and Vojislav Šešelj came to light after Nikolić's statement that the Serbian Radical Party (SRS), a far-right political party, in the National Assembly would support the Stabilisation and Association Process agreement for the accession of Serbia to the European Union; Nikolić's statement was met with the resistance from Šešelj and his supporters. Nikolić, who was the head of the SRS parliamentary group and a deputy president of the party since 1992, resigned from these posts on 7 September 2008. A day later, Nikolić formed the "Forward, Serbia" parliamentary group with 10 other MPs; five more MPs joined the parliamentary group in the following days. Božidar Delić and Jorgovanka Tabaković, high-ranking members of SRS, were one of the founding members of the parliamentary group.

On 11 September, Nikolić announced that the "Forward, Serbia" parliamentary group would transform itself into a political party. It was speculated that Aleksandar Vučić, the general-secretary of SRS, would join the newly formed party; Nikolić later that day confirmed that he would join the party. A day later, SRS dismissed Nikolić and 17 other MPs from the party due to their opposition to Šešelj, while Vučić left SRS on 13 September. Nikolić stated that the newly formed party would be the party of the "modern right", whilst supporting strengthening relations with the European Union and Russia. On 24 September, Nikolić announced that the party would be called the Serbian Progressive Party (SNS). SNS was registered as a political party on 10 October, while the founding convention was held on 21 October, at which a 20-man presidency was presented with Nikolić as the president and Vučić as deputy president. During the period of its formation, SNS gained 21 members in the National Assembly in total and members of local chapters of SRS switched their affiliation to SNS.

=== 2008–2011: Opposition ===
In November 2008, SNS called for snap parliamentary elections to be held by October 2009; this proposal was also later supported by Čedomir Jovanović, leader of the Liberal Democratic Party (LDP). Later that month, Vučić stated that SNS would act in opposition to the Democratic Party (DS). SNS opposed the DS initiative regarding constitutional changes in May 2009, which it described as "frivolous". A month later, SNS took part in local elections in Zemun, a Belgrade municipality known for being the stronghold of SRS; SNS won 34% of the popular vote, while SRS only won 10%. By July 2009, SNS established itself as the strongest opposition party in Serbia. SNS took part in local elections in Voždovac and Kostolac in December 2009; in Voždovac, it won 37% of the popular vote and 26 seats in the Local Assembly, while in Kostolac it won 12% of the popular vote. Following the elections, SNS formed a local government with the Democratic Party of Serbia (DSS) and New Serbia (NS) in Voždovac. CeSID, a non-governmental and electoral monitoring organisation, argued that the reason behind their electoral success was due to their anti-corruption promises.

SNS announced in February 2010 that it collected over 500,000 signatures in favour of snap parliamentary elections; a month later, it claimed that the number grew to over a million signatures. After March 2010, SNS claimed that DS "was pulling the country into a deep crisis", and that in response it would organise anti-government protests in Belgrade. SNS declaratively supported the Srebrenica Declaration and condemned the victims of the 1995 massacre in Srebrenica, although it abstained from voting in the National Assembly in March 2010. SNS announced in December 2010, that it would organise protests in February 2011; New Serbia also said that it would join the protests. SNS handed over 304,580 signatures in favour of changing the constitution in January 2011. A series of anti-government protests that were organised by SNS began in February 2011. SNS demanded the government to call snap elections by December 2011. Initially the protests were held in Belgrade, although they spread throughout other locations in Serbia in March and April 2011. Nikolić went on a hunger strike in mid-April, after demanding president Boris Tadić to call snap parliamentary elections.

=== 2012–2013: Early years in government ===
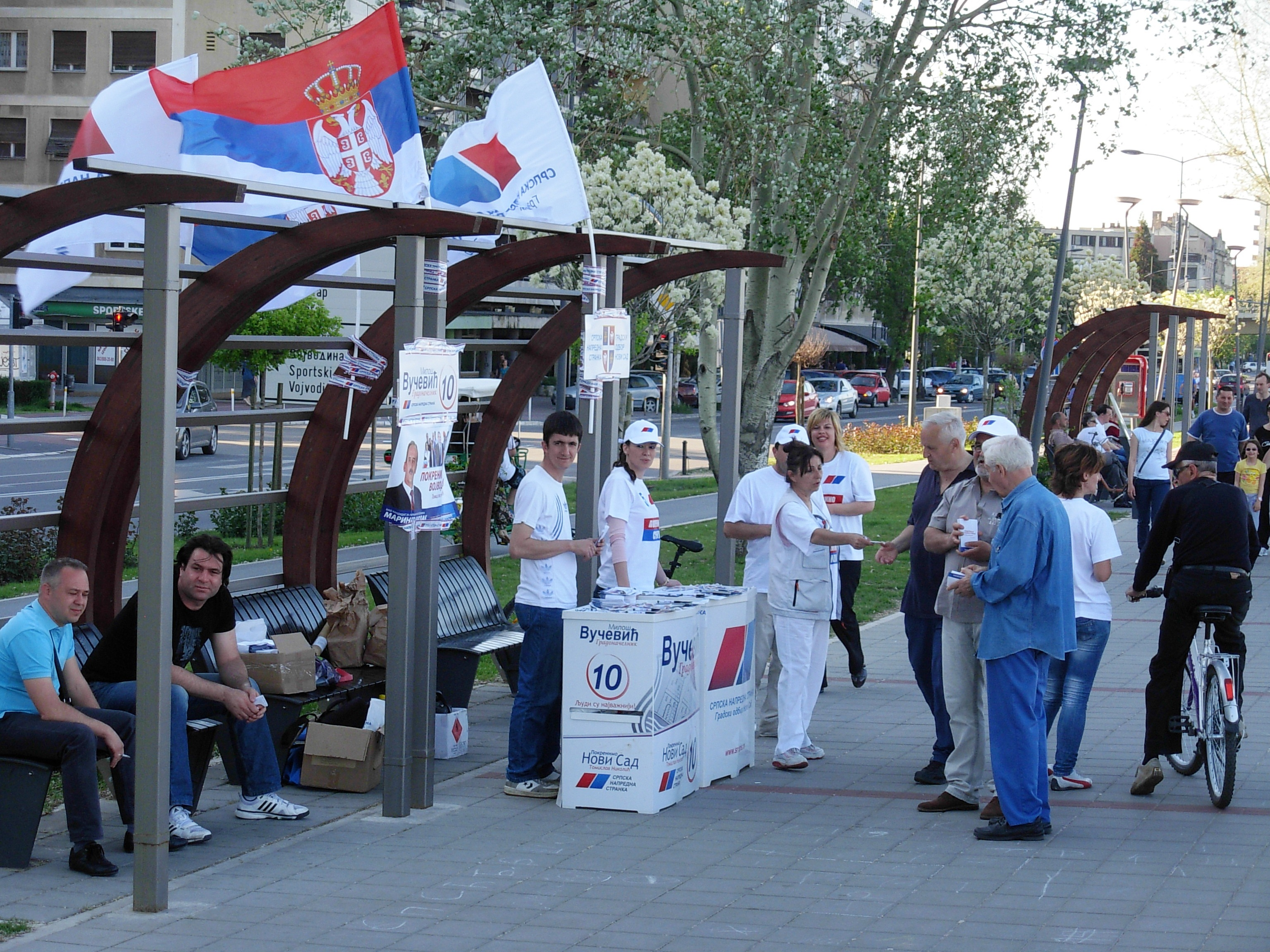
SNS members campaigning during the 2012 general election campaign period

Back in November 2010, SNS signed a cooperation agreement with New Serbia and two other parties, the Movement of Socialists (PS) and Strength of Serbia Movement (PSS). The parties later held a meeting in February 2011 and took part together in protests that were organised by SNS. The protests played a role in boosting the popularity of SNS, while opinion polls had shown that SNS received more support from voters than DS. Due to the anti-government protests, President Tadić called for general elections to be held in spring of 2012. In January 2012, it was confirmed that SNS would take part in a joint parliamentary list together with NS, PS, PSS, and eight minor parties and associations. The coalition was later named "Let's Get Serbia Moving". Nikolić was chosen as the presidential candidate of SNS, while Tabaković was chosen as the candidate for prime minister.

During the campaign period, SNS criticised DS whilst campaigning on a pro-European platform, as well as promising to "correct the mistakes of DS". Rudy Giuliani, the former mayor of New York City, met with Nikolić and Vučić during the campaign period in Belgrade to consult for them. In the parliamentary election, the SNS-led coalition topped at the first place with 25% of the popular vote and won 73 seats in the National Assembly; SNS itself won 55 seats. Nikolić accused DS of vote fraud; during a press conference he showed a bag with about three thousand ballots that were allegedly thrown into a trash can. In the presidential election, Nikolić received enough support to enter the second run-off against President Tadić; Nikolić won. SNS did not receive the highest number of votes in the provincial and Belgrade City Assembly elections, and was unable to form governments in Vojvodina and Belgrade. On 24 May 2012, Nikolić resigned as the president of SNS and was succeeded by Vučić, who was then later elected in September 2012; Tabaković was also elected deputy president.

Nikolić held consultations with parliamentary parties after the election. After the consultations, Ivica Dačić, the leader of the Socialist Party of Serbia (SPS), was given the mandate to form a government. Dačić reached a deal with SNS and the United Regions of Serbia (URS) and on 27 July the new government was sworn in. Vučić became the first deputy prime minister. After becoming the first deputy prime minister, Vučić entered into a conflict with oligarch businessman Miroslav Mišković; he claimed that Mišković allegedly "gained illegal profit" in the 2000s. Mišković was arrested in December 2012 on suspicion of corruption, although in July 2013 he was released from custody. In October 2012, it was reported that SNS had over 330,000 members. The People's Party (NP), led by former mayor of Novi Sad Maja Gojković, merged into SNS in December 2012. By February 2013, SNS received over 40% of support in opinion polls, while DS, now in opposition, had 13% of support.

In July 2013, SNS and SPS concluded that they would continue leading the government without URS; the SNS–SPS government was then reshuffled in early September 2013. Veroljub Arsić, who served as the head of the SNS parliamentary group, was replaced by Zoran Babić in August 2013. A month later, Dragan Đilas, the mayor of Belgrade, was dismissed after a vote of no confidence that was called by SNS and DSS; SPS and the Party of United Pensioners of Serbia (PUPS) also voted in support of the vote. Guy de Launey, a BBC News correspondent, Dragoljub Žarković, the co-founder of the Vreme newspaper, and journalist Koča Pavlović, stated that Vučić held the most influence and power in the government due to his status as the president of the largest party in the coalition government. Freedom House, a non-profit research organisation, noted that the efforts to curb corruption during 2013 received mixed results.

=== 2014–2016: First SNS-led government ===
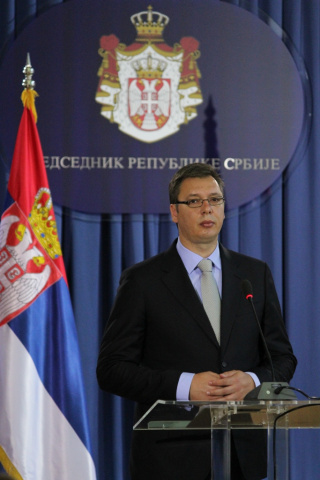
Vučić became the prime minister of Serbia in 2014

SNS held an assembly on 26 January 2014 at which Vučić was re-elected unopposed as the party's president. At the assembly, he proposed to "test the will of the people" and called for a snap parliamentary election. President Nikolić dissolved the National Assembly on 29 January and set the parliamentary election to be held on 16 March 2014. In February, SNS presented its ballot list under the name "Future We Believe In". Additionally, it was announced that the Social Democratic Party of Serbia (SDPS), Serbian Renewal Movement (SPO), and Christian Democratic Party of Serbia (DHSS) would appear on its list, alongside NS, PS, and PSS, who appeared on the SNS list in 2012. SNS campaigned on its anti-corruption platform, although Aleksandar Pavković, a Macquarie University professor, noted that there was no evidence that the platform decreased corruption. SNS also based its platform on criticising its opponents, especially DS. In the parliamentary election, the SNS-led coalition won a majority of 158 seats in the National Assembly. Simultaneously, the City Assembly elections were held in Belgrade, in which the SNS-led coalition won 63 out of 110 seats. Siniša Mali, an independent nominated by SNS, was elected mayor of Belgrade on 24 April 2014. Vučić was elected and sworn in as prime minister three days later. His first cabinet was mostly composed of SNS and SPS individuals. A United States Agency for International Development (USAID) report noted that the SNS now had "complete political dominance" due to the status of Vučić as prime minister. BBC News described the victory as an "unprecedented event".

In October 2014, Radomir Nikolić, the son of President Nikolić, was brought to power in Kragujevac, the fourth largest city in Serbia by population, after successfully removing Veroljub Stevanović from power after a vote of no confidence. By early 2015, SNS reported that it had around 500,000 members. Since coming to power, no major protests in Serbia were held until the anti-government protests in April 2015. The Do not let Belgrade drown (NDB) initiative, which headed the protests, opposed the Belgrade Waterfront, an urban development project headed by the Government of Serbia; one of its representatives described it as a "big scam". The project previously received criticism, with Milan Nešić, a Radio Free Europe journalist, describing it as a "pre-election trick". The protests lasted up to September 2015. After the cuts in public sector, protests were also held in December 2015. Freedom House criticised the SNS-led government by stating that it displayed "a sharp intolerance for any kind of criticism either from opposition parties, independent media, civil society, or even ordinary citizens".

In January 2016, Vučić announced that parliamentary elections will be held in April 2016. Der Standard, an Austrian daily newspaper, stated that "[Vučić] now has an absolute majority, and he wants to ensure it for the next four years". Vučić stated that the reason behind the snap election was to "ensure a fresh mandate to push European Union accession". SNS began its campaign in late February 2016. In early March, President Nikolić dissolved the National Assembly and scheduled the parliamentary elections for 24 April 2016. This time, SNS took part under the "Serbia Is Winning" banner, while individuals from the Party of United Pensioners of Serbia (PUPS) and Serbian People's Party (SNP) were also present on its ballot list, including individuals from parties that took part with SNS in the 2014 election. It was also reported that Aleksandar Martinović would replace Babić as the head of the SNS parliamentary group. During the campaign, SNS expressed its support for the European Union and military neutrality, while maintaining cooperation with NATO, and ensuring economic reforms and a Western-type economy. The Organisation for Security and Co-operation in Europe (OSCE) noted that billboards and posters that promoted SNS were dominant during the campaign. In the parliamentary election, the SNS-led coalition won a majority of 131 seats in the National Assembly. Simultaneously, the provincial election was held in Vojvodina, in which SNS won 63 out of 120 seats in the Assembly of Vojvodina. Florian Bieber, a Luxembourgian political scientist, noted that "the landslide victory did not come as a surprise". DS, DSS, the Social Democratic Party (SDS), Liberal Democratic Party (LDP), League of Social Democrats of Vojvodina (LSV), Dveri, and Enough is Enough (DJB), all whom were in opposition to SNS, claimed that SNS allegedly stole the elections.

Shortly after the election, opposition parties organised a protest in Belgrade. Another series of anti-government protests began in Belgrade in May 2016 after the demolition of private objects in Savamala, an urban neighbourhood in Belgrade where the Belgrade Waterfront project is supposed to be built. The NDB initiative organised the protests which ended up lasting until October 2016. Vučić was re-elected president of SNS in May 2016. Igor Mirović was elected president of the Government of Vojvodina in June 2016. Vučić was given the mandate by President Nikolić to form a government, which he did with SPS in August 2016. Ana Brnabić, an openly lesbian and independent politician, was appointed minister in the Vučić's cabinet. In December 2016, Vučić affirmed that he would not run in the 2017 presidential election, although he also stated that the main body of SNS would decide its presidential candidate.

=== 2017–2019: Second SNS-led government ===
In January 2017, President Nikolić stated that he would want to run for re-election, although ministers such as Zorana Mihajlović and Aleksandar Vulin persuaded Vučić to run instead. A month later, SNS announced Vučić as its presidential candidate. Vučić received support from the coalition partners of SNS, and SPS, Alliance of Vojvodina Hungarians (VMSZ), and United Serbia (JS). During the campaign period, it was reported that major newspapers, such as Alo!, Blic, Večernje novosti, Politika, Dnevnik, Kurir, and Srpski telegraf, printed campaign posters of SNS on its front pages; Voice of America reported it as an "unprecedented move". Vučić campaigned on raising living standards, selling or shutting down state-owned companies, and austerity cuts. Robert Creamer, an American political consultant, criticised him and stated that "Vučić would be in a position to select a prime minister of his choice, [and] control the judiciary, and the election apparatus — eliminating all checks and balances in the Serbian government". In the presidential election, Vučić won 55% of the popular vote in the first run-off.

Shortly after his election, mass protests erupted in Belgrade, Novi Sad, Niš, and other locations in Serbia. The protests lasted until Vučić's inauguration, which occurred on 31 May 2017. In June 2017, Vučić proposed Brnabić as prime minister. She was sworn in on 29 June 2017. Radio Free Europe noted that even though the presidency is a ceremonial role, Vučić has retained de facto power of SNS, while the Belgrade Centre for Human Rights claimed that the political system de facto turned into a presidential one, similar to the era of Slobodan Milošević. Zoran Panović, a journalist for Danas, reported that by October 2017 SNS was close to reaching 600,000 members.

SNS announced its participation in the 2018 Belgrade City Assembly election under the "Because We Love Belgrade" banner in January 2018. Zoran Radojičić, a paediatric surgeon, was chosen to be the first candidate on its ballot list. At a conference in Belgrade Youth Center in February 2018, its ballot list candidates and election programme were presented. In the City Assembly election, SNS won 64 seats. CRTA, a non-governmental organisation, noted that SNS mostly criticised opposition politicians during the campaign period. Radojičić replaced Mali and was appointed mayor in June 2018.

In July 2018, political scientist Boban Stojanović noted that SNS had around 700,000 members. A series of anti-government protests, dubbed 1 of 5 million, began in December 2018 after an assault on Borko Stefanović, an opposition politician. The demonstrators criticised Vučić and SNS, demanded the end to political violence and stifling media freedom and freedom of expression. The protests, which were attended by tens of thousands, continued into 2019. In January 2019, SNS organised a meeting in support of Vladimir Putin's visit to Belgrade. A month later, SNS launched a campaign named "Future of Serbia", in contrary to the anti-government protests. Journalist Slobodan Georgiev noted that the campaign effectively silenced the protests. Prime Minister Brnabić joined SNS in October 2019.

=== 2020–2022: Supermajority in the National Assembly ===
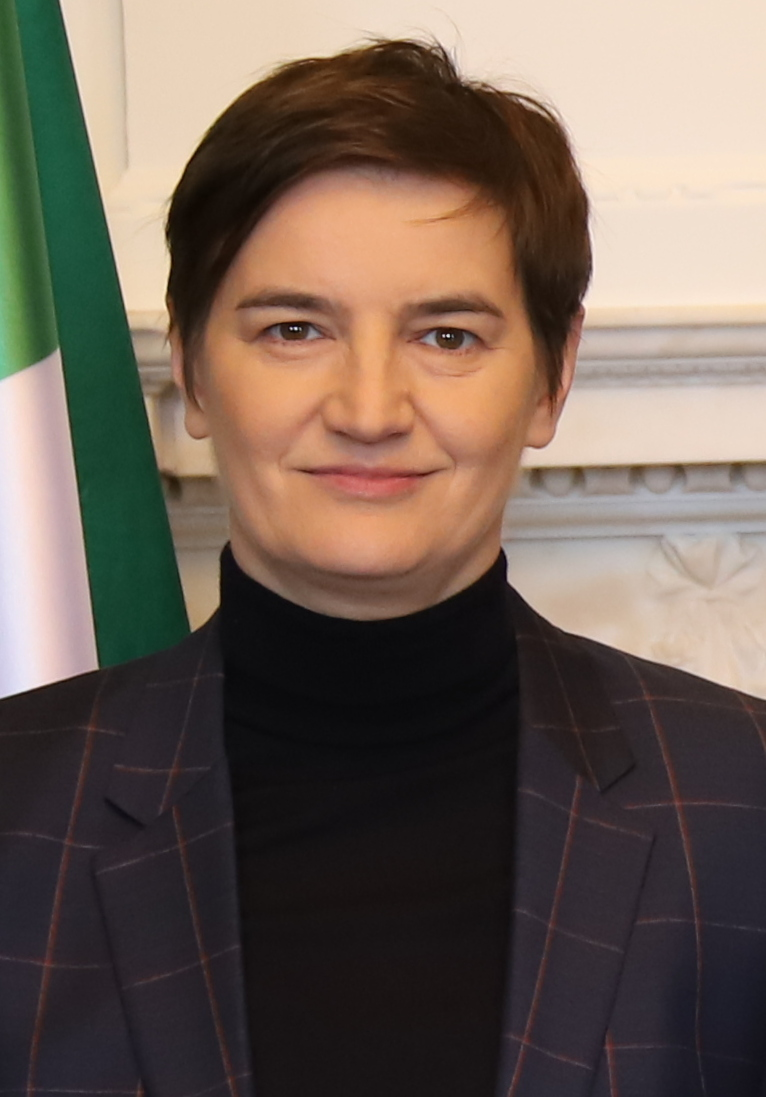
Brnabić, an independent politician who later joined SNS, was the prime minister of Serbia from 2017 to 2024.

In January 2020, Vučić announced that the electoral threshold would be lowered to 3 percent. Critics saw this as a way that SNS would allow the alleged "controlled opposition" to enter the National Assembly. SNS announced in February 2020 that it would take part under the "For Our Children" banner in the 2020 parliamentary election, stating that more than 50 percent of its ballot list would be comprised young people. The SNS-led ballot list was sent over to the Republic Electoral Commission (RIK) on 5 March, although the government postponed the election on 16 March due to the beginning of the COVID-19 pandemic in Serbia. Initially supposed to be held on 26 April, the election was postponed to 21 June 2020. In the same month, the anti-government protests which began in December 2018, formally ended in March 2020 due to the COVID-19 pandemic. The Alliance for Serbia (SzS), the major opposition alliance, announced that it would boycott the election, claiming that the elections would not be free and fair. Freedom House labelled Serbia as a hybrid regime in May 2020, citing alleged "increased state capture, abuse of power, and terror tactics" by Vučić. In June 2020, newspaper Danas reported that SNS had over 800,000 members.

In the parliamentary election, the SNS-led coalition won a supermajority of 188 seats; ignoring minority parties, SNS, the SPS–JS coalition, and the Serbian Patriotic Alliance (SPAS) only crossed the electoral threshold. Vučić described it as a "historical moment". Journalist Milenko Vasović saw the SNS election campaign as a promotion of Vučić and not the party itself. Simultaneously, a provincial election was held in Vojvodina in which SNS also won a supermajority of 76 seats. CeSID concluded that the election was met with "minimum democratic standards", while OSCE characterised that the election was met with political polarisation. Bieber described it as a pyrrhic victory for SNS and noted that the incoming legislation would not include opposition parties. Journalist Patrick Kingsley stated that the election could allow "for greater momentum in peace talks with Kosovo".

After gaining a supermajority in the National Assembly, the government of Serbia submitted a constitutional amendment regarding judiciary. In early July 2020, a series of protests and riots against the government and the announced tightening of measures due to the spread of COVID-19 began in Belgrade. It was reported that demonstrators took a peaceful approach in the protests, although that a group of far-right demonstrators also stormed the building of the National Assembly; the police shortly after cleared the building, although the clashes continued outside. The government responded by taking a violent approach towards the demonstrators. The protests lasted until the first constitutive session of the post-2020 election legislation, which occurred on 3 August 2020. After the first constitutive session, the SNS parliamentary group changed its name to "Aleksandar Vučić – For Our Children". Prime Minister Brnabić was re-elected in October 2020, while her new cabinet was mostly composed of members of SNS, SPS, and SPAS. The National Assembly adopted the proposal for constitutional changes in December 2020.

Vučić announced in early May 2021 that he submitted a proposal to merge SPAS into SNS. Aleksandar Šapić, the leader of SPAS, stated that he supported the proposal. The merge was completed on 26 May, after which Šapić was appointed vice-president of SNS while SPAS MPs joined SNS in June 2021. Dialogues to improve election conditions between government and opposition parties, in which SNS took part, began in May 2021 and lasted until late October 2021. A series of environmental protests began in September 2021 due to the concerns about the Project Jadar, a lithium mining project headed by Rio Tinto, an Anglo-Australian mining company. The Government of Serbia supported the Project Jadar, whilst SNS officials also criticised the protests. The protests lasted until 15 February 2022. The government of Serbia adopted changes for the law on referendum and people's initiative on 10 November 2021. The changes received criticism due to the abolishment of the 50 percent turnout that was needed for referendums to pass. At the end of the November 2021, Vučić was re-elected president of SNS. In January 2022, a constitutional referendum was held. A majority of 60% of voters voted in favour of proposed changes, an option which was supported by SNS.

In preparation for the 2022 general election, SNS and SPS announced that they would not run on a joint parliamentary list but that SPS would support the presidential candidate of SNS. Additionally, SNS announced Šapić as its mayoral candidate for the Belgrade City Assembly election. The National Assembly was dissolved in February 2022 to call snap parliamentary elections; presidential elections were called next month. In the 2022 election, SNS took part under the "Together We Can Do Everything" banner, while Vučić was announced as the presidential candidate of SNS in March 2022. Transparency Serbia noted that SNS had a significant domination in the media during the campaign period, while CRTA alleged that the campaign period was met in worse conditions than in 2020. In the presidential election, Vučić was re-elected after winning 60% of the popular vote, while in the parliamentary election, the SNS-led coalition won 120 seats. In the Belgrade City Assembly election, the SNS-led coalition won 48 seats. Šapić was elected mayor of Belgrade in June 2022. Milenko Jovanov was appointed head of the SNS parliamentary group in August 2022, replacing Martinović, who was its head since 2016. Later that month, Prime Minister Brnabić was given another mandate to form a government. The composition of her third cabinet was announced on 23 October, while the cabinet was sworn in on 26 October.

=== 2023–2026: Change in leadership ===
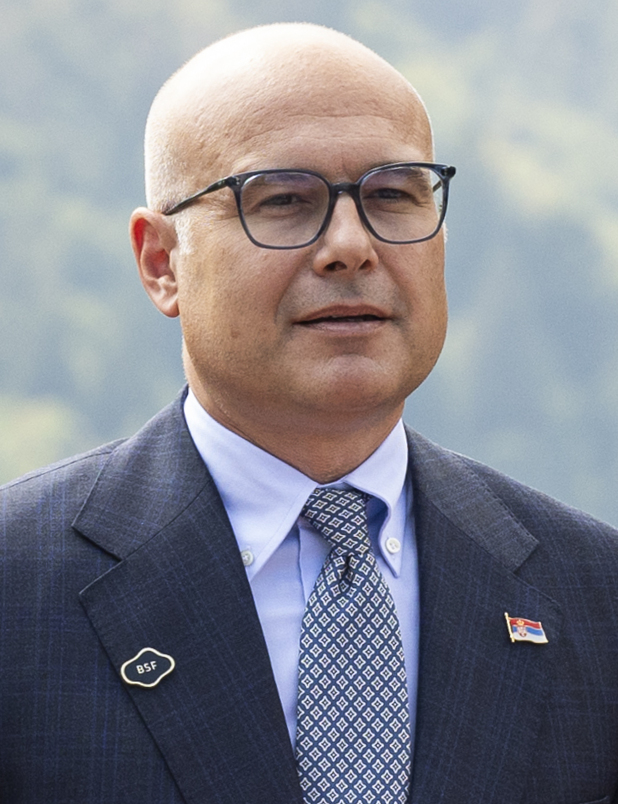
Miloš Vučević was elected president of SNS in 2023 and prime minister of Serbia in 2024

In February 2023, two MPs as well as two members of the City Assembly of Belgrade formerly affiliated with the Serbian Party Oathkeepers (SSZ) defected to SNS, citing their disapproval with their former party's leader. Later that month, another member of the City Assembly of Belgrade defected to SNS, while in March 2023, an MP that was previously a member of the Movement for the Restoration of the Kingdom of Serbia (POKS) defected to SNS. Better Serbia, led by its only MP Dragan Jovanović, merged into SNS in April. Žika Gojković, the former leader of POKS, joined SNS in late October 2023.

Beginning in September 2022, speculations arose whether Vučić would form a separate political party. Vučić confirmed the formation of the People's Movement for the State (NPZD), a political movement, in March 2023. It was announced that SNS will be a member of the movement. Initially, the movement was set to be formed by May 2023, however, the date of the formalisation was then moved to autumn 2023. At the SNS main board session, held in October 2023, there were no mentions of NPZD, however, later that month, Vučić announced that NPZD will be formalised "in the coming period". Vučić revived the question about the formation of the NPZD in February 2024; he said that the movement "should continue the economic growth of Serbia and defend [Serbia's] national and state interests" (koji će imati snage da ubrza ekonomski rast Srbije i odbrani naše nacionalne i državne interese). In an interview in December 2024, Vučić announced that the movement is scheduled to be formed on 15 March 2025 and that he would not preside over the movement. A rally promoting the movement was held on 24 January 2025.

A party assembly and a leadership election was held on 27 May 2023. Miloš Vučević was elected as Vučić's successor and president of SNS. Journalist Ana Lalić characterised the change as "cosmetic". Vučević is a close associate and lawyer of the Vučić family, including Andrej Vučić.

Following the mass shootings in May 2023, the Belgrade school shooting and a mass murder near Mladenovac and Smederevo, SNS was met with anti-government protests, dubbed Serbia Against Violence. The protests were attended by tens of thousands of demonstrators and despite being organised by opposition parties, no party signs were reported to be seen at the protests. Due to SNS not accepting the demands of the protests, opposition parties organising the protests started demanding for early elections in September 2023. Throughout 2023, Vučić announced several times that he would call early elections, ultimately setting 17 December as the date of the elections once opposition parties started demanding early election. For the 2023 parliamentary election, SNS announced that it would contest under the Serbia Must Not Stop banner with its allies. In the parliamentary election, SNS was also joined by opposition-turned-pro-government parties such as Milan Stamatović's Healthy Serbia, Tatjana Macura formerly of Party of Modern Serbia, Radoslav Milojičić's Serbian Left, and Dejan Bulatović's Alliance of Social Democrats. Provincial elections were also called on 16 November; SNS submitted its electoral list on the same day. For the first time, Mirović did not appear on the SNS electoral list for the provincial election.

In the parliamentary election, the SNS-led coalition won 128 seats, 103 seats of which went to SNS alone. In the provincial election, it won 53 seats and in the Belgrade City Assembly election, it won 40 seats. The Belgrade City Assembly election resulted in a hung parliament. After the elections, the Serbia Against Violence coalition organised anti-government protests up to 30 December. Once the 14th National Assembly of Serbia was constituted, Jovanov continued to chair the SNS-led parliamentary group. The City Assembly of Belgrade was not constituted because the quorum was not met during the constitutive session. This resulted into the 2024 Belgrade City Assembly election. For this election, SNS formed a joint electoral list with its partners, including SPS and SSZ. Vučević said that the electoral list is effectively the NPZD. Journalist Zoran Panović said that with the formation of the electoral list, the NPZD was also effectively created, despite not having an official announcement. In the election, the Belgrade Tomorrow electoral list won 52 percent of the popular vote and 64 out of 110 seats in the City Assembly of Belgrade.

During Vučević's term as prime minister, the Novi Sad railway station canopy collapsed in November 2024. In the aftermath, ministers Goran Vesić and Tomislav Momirović resigned. Soon after, mass student-led anti-corruption protests began in December 2024. Amidst the protests, Vučić claimed that within SNS he had 17,000 "extremely pro-Russian oriented loyalists", including his brother Andrej Vučić, who swore a blood oath to defend him and his regime against an alleged Western-backed "colour revolution" in Serbia. After a group of students were physically attacked in Novi Sad by the party activists, Vučević tendered his resignation from office on 28 January 2025. He was succeeded by Đuro Macut, an independent politician nominated by SNS, in April 2025.

=== 2026: Electoral defeat ===
For the 2026 parliamentary election, the SNS-led coalition contested the election as "Aleksandar Vučić – United Serbia". SNS unanimously nominated Vučić, then the president of Serbia, as its candidate for prime minister and the head of the list. Vučić resigned as president on 27 September, with Brnabić, the president of the National Assembly, becoming acting president; the presidential election has to be held by 27 December 2026. SPS, the junior partner in every SNS-led government since 2012, did not join the list; it announced that it would run in a coalition with United Serbia, the Social Democratic Party of Serbia and the Greens of Serbia, and contested the election as "Ivica Dačić – Factor of Stability!".

According to the final results announced by the Republic Electoral Commission on 5 November, after voting had been repeated at 53 polling stations, the SNS-led list won 1,731,323 votes (39.48%) and 103 seats, while the Student List won 140 seats, an absolute majority. Vučić conceded defeat on election night, saying that SNS would "show them what opposition is" and that, while some businessmen would now leave the party, its structure remained "very solid". Analysts interviewed by Danas expected the party to hold a congress at which Vučić, by then an ordinary member, could again be elected its president, and predicted attrition and internal conflicts within SNS after its loss of power. On 27 October, Vučević announced that marketing expert Nebojša Krstić and actress Lidija Vukićević had joined the party.

On 31 October, at a session in the Belgrade Arena, the SNS main board unanimously backed Vučević's proposal to convene an extraordinary party assembly on 13 December to elect a new leadership, at which Vučević said he would propose Vučić as party president. Vučić said that SNS might not field a candidate in the presidential election due by the end of December, saying that under the current conditions it was "not realistic", although he did not rule it out.

The mandates of the list's 103 deputies were confirmed at the constitutive sitting of the 15th National Assembly on 17 November 2026. Its parliamentary group, renamed "Aleksandar Vučić – Serbia Is Winning", has 102 members and is led by Vučić, with Milenko Jovanov as his deputy; besides SNS, it includes four deputies of the SRS, three of PUPS, and one each of the Bosniak-Serb Alliance, the People's Peasant Party, the United Peasant Party and the Workers' Party, as well as four independents. Marko Korać, elected on the list on the SNS's proposal, did not join the group. The group nominated Stojan Radenović, who chaired the sitting as the oldest deputy, for President of the National Assembly, while the Student List nominated Aleksandar Čupić.

== Ideology and platform ==
=== Political leanings ===
Following the establishment of SNS, Aleksandar Vučić denounced his previous support for the establishment of Greater Serbia, while Tomislav Nikolić stated that SNS would continue the accession of Serbia to the European Union. SNS declared its main tasks to be "fight against corruption and the realisation of the rule of law", while describing itself as a "state-building party". Its white paper (election programme) was published in October 2011. Jovan Teokarević, an associate professor at the Belgrade Faculty of Political Sciences, described their ideological orientation as a "complete u-turn" in comparison with the Serbian Radical Party (SRS). Bojana Barlovac, a Balkan Insight journalist, stated that SNS "became much closer to DS on its policy profile", although in 2013, she described the party as conservative.

==== Populism ====
SNS has been described as a populist party. SNS presented itself as a party of the ordinary people who were "left behind socioeconomically by the transition to democracy and a market economy". Biserko stated that SNS is populist and that it built its ideological image on "social dissatisfaction". Zoran Lutovac, a political scientist and future president of DS, described SNS as populist. He also added that SNS does not have a "coherent ideology" and that its coalition "includes everyone, regardless of their ideology". Scholars and political scientists such as Justin Vaïsse and Florian Bieber also agreed that SNS is populist. Zoran Stojiljković and Dušan Spasojević, professors at the Belgrade Faculty of Political Sciences, noted that following the formation of SNS, the Serbian political system acquired characteristics of moderate pluralism, and described SNS as a catch-all party. Additionally, they noted that SNS was formed as a centre-right party, although its image shifted to the centre after the 2012 elections. Stojiljković and Spasojević also noted that SNS showed "clear populistic elements", and that "populist ideas are integral and important for its ideological profile".

==== Nationalism and illiberalism ====
SNS has also been described as nationalist, including as "nationalist populist" or "populist nationalist". Political scientist Jerzy Wiatr described it as a nationalist-populist party that benefited from disenchantment with the inability of liberal-democratic parties to deal with the consequences of the Yugoslav Wars for Serbia, while A. A. Manolescu described Vučić's ideology as a form of neo-nationalism that "combines neo-nationalist sovereignty assertion with Serb ethnic nationalism". Daniel Bochsler, a professor at Central European University and the University of Belgrade, said in 2023 that SNS had emerged from the split in the SRS "as a post-fascist movement" and was "now trying to come across as a grassroots centre-right party", comparing this to the trajectory of Giorgia Meloni, and that Vučić relied on "cronyism and populism, spiced with a bit of nationalism".

Political scientist Dimitri Sotiropoulos writes that SNS distanced itself from the open ultranationalism of the SRS, including its irredentist goal of a Greater Serbia, and promised European integration, but without completely abandoning its nationalist profile. He describes its populism as anti-democratic, built around a cult of personality of Vučić and the concentration of power in his hands, and links its rule to Serbia's democratic backsliding, during which opponents have been labelled "foreign agents". Hungarian scholar Mária Bordás describes Vučić as a "nationalist and populist" leader "clearly encouraging the idea of Serbian nationalism, to extend Serbia beyond its borders", in the context of a wave of illiberalism in post-communist Europe, which she treats as far-right.

Several authors and media outlets have grouped Vučić's party and government with other illiberal movements, particularly that of Viktor Orbán in Hungary. The Istituto Affari Internazionali described Vučić and Orbán as "illiberal right-wing populists" whose rule fostered patronage networks and the capture of state institutions, and political scientist Marlene Laruelle, who defines illiberalism as, above all, an ideology, has listed Vučić's Serbia among illiberal regimes. Václav Štětka and Sabina Mihelj describe SNS as "at the forefront of Serbia's illiberal turn", and group Vučić with Orbán and Jarosław Kaczyński as leaders who used populism to mobilise support and shared a "commitment to ethno-nationalism, disdain for cultural liberalism, and a propensity for adopting majoritarian solutions and undermining key democratic institutions, such as the judiciary and independent media". They note, however, that Serbian public media adopted a "more moderate tone" than commercial pro-government outlets, and that SNS made limited gestures on LGBT rights, such as appointing Ana Brnabić as prime minister, to signal its pro-European orientation.

Andrijana Lazarević and Aleksandra Marković describe SNS as combining "valence populism with elements of nationalism, authoritarianism, and a soft Eurosceptic stance", but note that it "has not joined transnational far-right or radical populist networks" and instead "positions itself as a stabilizing force with a nationalist-populist profile adapted to Serbia's context".

==== Descriptions as a catch-all party ====
Marko Stojić, a Metropolitan University Prague lecturer, also noted that SNS has an eclectic and weakly-rooted ideological profile and that it lacks firm political principles, while he also described SNS as a "typical catch-all party". Eric Gordy, a professor at the University College London, considers SNS to be a party "based around [Vučić]". Political analyst Ivana Petronijević Terzić has described SNS as clientelistic and said that SNS does not represent any ideology or a category of population. Dušan Milenković, a political consultant, compared SNS to the League of Communists of Yugoslavia (SKJ), however, he added that unlike SKJ, SNS does not express a clear ideology and its policy is rather based on populist measures that may be found across wide spectrum of political ideologies, from the left to the right, while what unites the people joining it is the desire of "proximity to power." De Launey described SNS as an "ideologically elusive" party.

Ognjen Zorić of Radio Free Europe also described the party as centrist and catch-all, although he noted that "some analysts also stated that the party is right-leaning and conservative". Bieber described SNS as centre-right but also as "non-ideological". BBC News noted that SNS "does not have a clear programmatic nor ideological vision", and added that SNS functions as a catch-all party. Bojan Klačar of CeSID stated that SNS "espouses a right-of-centre ideology", but stated that "more importantly, SNS is a catch-all party" that captures a wide variety of opinions, and that SNS can be also considered to be liberal and pro-European. Political scientists Đorđe Pavićević and Boban Stojanović, journalist Ivan Radovanović, and authors Aleksandar Marinković and Novak Gajić also described SNS as a catch-all party. Danas noted that as a catch-all party, SNS has sought to "attract all voters, regardless of ideological commitment" and has flirted with "the most diverse ideologies". Journalist Vuk Jeremić wrote that SNS absorbed ideas and individuals indiscriminately, from technocrats to former officials of the Milošević government—"a bit to the left, a bit to the right, all packaged in a populist form" (malo levo, malo desno, a sve upakovano u populistički pitku formu).

In 2024, Dušan Spasojević wrote that SNS was "born as a moderate, pro-European, and right-wing party" and later "developed a distinctive right-wing, catch-all, and populist ideology" while aiming to occupy the centre of the political space "in spatial, not ideological terms"; to do so, it combined contradictory positions, such as supporting EU membership while maintaining good relations with Russia and China, or having "an LGBT prime minister to pinkwash presidents' soft anti-LGBT rhetoric". Lazarević and Marković similarly describe its populism as "flexible, pragmatic and catch-all rather than ideologically rigid".

==== Descriptions as centrist to right-wing ====
Political scientist Vassilis Petsinis stated that SNS took advantage of fragmentation of centrist and centre-right political parties and that it has consolidated its grip on power by dominating the "continuum that stretches from the liberal centre to the conservative right". Additionally, political scientist Branislav Radeljić, author Laurence Mitchell, and Palgrave Macmillan in their The Statesman's Yearbook had described SNS as centrist, while George Vasilev, a La Trobe University lecturer, and Srđan Mladenov Jovanović, a scholar, described SNS as centre-right; some authors had also described it as a right-wing party.

Sociologist Jovo Bakić described SNS as a "pragmatically re-profiled" and moderately conservative party, and compared its development to Gianfranco Fini's projects in Italy. Additionally, he stated that "since its foundation SNS had wanted to remodel itself as a conservative party".

In 2024, political analyst Đorđe Vukadinović told NIN that the government had visibly shifted to the right, but mainly in its rhetoric, while in practice it was increasingly fulfilling "the key demands and wishes of Brussels and Washington"; political scientist Rade Veljanovski argued that right-wing ideas had dominated Serbian politics for more than thirty years and that "SNS has always been on the right", adding that the ruling parties "no longer hide" their ideological position.

==== Conservatism ====
Some scholars and journalists also described SNS as conservative, liberal-conservative, and national-conservative. Stojić said that even though SNS "claimed to belong to the [conservative] family", it is essentially pragmatic and weakly ideologically profiled.

In 2021, some SNS MPs voiced their support for the legalisation of same-sex relationships. Aleksandar Šapić's SPAS, which merged into SNS in 2022, also supported same-sex relationships. Gordana Čomić, a minister in the SNS government, worked on introducing the law to the National Assembly.

=== Economy ===
SNS is economically neoliberal, and it advocates for austerity, market economy reforms, privatisation, reduced spending, and liberalisation of labour laws. Stojiljković and Spasojević noted that SNS already displayed their neoliberal position during the 2012 election period, and that SNS campaigned on significantly reducing subsidies, but also the number of MPs, ministries, agencies, institutes, and the state administration. Additionally, Stojiljković described its position as "neoliberal populist". While in power, SNS has introduced a law that reformed wages and pensions, which received controversy as wages and pensions were reduced by this law. It has also reformed the labour law, introduced a lex specialis for Belgrade Waterfront, and reformed the law on financial assistance to families and organ donations.

=== Media and civil liberties ===
SNS has enacted centralisation policies, especially in Vojvodina. Since coming to power in 2012, observers have assessed that Serbia has suffered from democratic backsliding into authoritarianism, followed by a decline in media freedom and civil liberties. A research that was conducted by Cenzolovka in 2015 noted that SNS used media outlets to further their influence. Additionally, SNS was accused of paying internet trolls to praise the government and condemn those who think the opposite on internet forums and social networks. In 2020, Twitter suspended 8,558 accounts that promoted SNS and Vučić, whilst criticising the opposition. Meta suspended 5,374 accounts and 12 Facebook groups that were connected to SNS in the fourth quarter of 2022, stating that the "SNS network functioned differently than traditional troll networks". Additionally, Meta revealed that SNS spent over 150,000$ USD on advertising on Facebook and Instagram. In July 2023, 14,310 Twitter, Facebook, and Instagram accounts that praised the SNS, Vučić, and the government and criticised the opposition were leaked to the public, including their full names and places of origins. In response, member of parliament Nebojša Bakarec started a campaign named "Yes, I am a bot", with Vučić later uploading a photo on Instagram titled "Yes, I am too a SNS bot".

In 2021, the V-Dem Institute categorised Serbia as an electoral autocracy; the institute also stated that the standards of judiciary and electoral integrity had declined in the past ten years. According to the Freedom House's report from 2022, SNS has "eroded political rights and civil liberties, put pressure on independent media, the political opposition, and civil society organisations". Additionally, it reported that internet portals close to the government that "manipulate facts and slander independent media" continued to receive public funds on state and local levels. As a response, Vučić and Brnabić criticised Freedom House's report.

=== Foreign policies ===
Journalists have described SNS as pro-European. SNS advocates for close economic and political ties, as well as accession of Serbia to the European Union, alongside "productive ties" with Russia. Biserko stated that its support for European Union is rather a "declarative support", and not a substantial one. Stojić described SNS as "soft Euroenthusiast". Additionally, Vladimir Goati, a political scientist, described the position of SNS towards the European Union rather as pragmatic, than ideological, while economic anthropologist Jovana Diković described SNS as "euro-pragmatic". Analyst Miljan Mladenović said that the SNS coalition includes a big tent of voices, including Aleksandar Vulin, Zorana Mihajlović, and the former NATO voices of the Serbian Renewal Movement.

In a 2014 report, Freedom House noted that the SNS-led government advanced Serbia's efforts regarding the European Union. Dragan Đukanović, a Belgrade Faculty of Political Sciences professor, noted that SNS received support from the U.S. and European Union due to its pro-European agenda. Sonja Biserko, a human rights activist, argued in 2013 that SNS declaratively adopted the agenda of DS and the Liberal Democratic Party (LDP) regarding the views on the European Union. Jacobin, an American socialist magazine, described SNS as a fusion of "a nationalist, pro-Russian wing and a modernising, pro-European wing", while describing Nikolić as being represented in the pro-Russian wing, and Vučić in the pro-European wing, although that both wings agree on neoliberal austerity.

A European Parliament-published study noted that the SNS-led government continued the "four-pillar policy", a policy that seeks cooperation with European Union, United States, Russia, and China, which was introduced by Boris Tadić, the former president of Serbia and leader of DS. During the 2015 European migrant crisis, the SNS-led government did not impose any restrictions on migrants while crossing into the European Union, which author Vedran Džihić as a pragmatic move. Stojić described the move as "populist-Euroenthusiastic". SNS supports military neutrality and it opposes joining NATO, although Serbia has continued militarily cooperating with NATO.

Following the beginning of the Russian invasion of Ukraine, the government of Serbia led by SNS has condemned the invasion but has not implemented sanctions on Russia. In the United Nations, Serbia voted in favour of resolutions that condemned the invasion of Ukraine. Nikola Selaković of SNS has also said that Serbia would not recognise the 2022 annexation referendums in Russian-occupied Ukraine. Vučić has also criticised the Wagner Group and has described Ukraine as Serbia's friend.

=== Demographic characteristics ===
Political scientist Slaviša Orlović noted in 2011 that supporters of SNS tended to be the unemployed, pensioners, and housewives. According to the Centre for Free Elections and Democracy (CeSID) in 2012, a majority of SNS supporters were male, primary or high school educated, workers', technicians, and dependents, while they had a widespread age structure. In 2014, CeSID reported that its voting base now mostly consisted of people over age of 50, while ideologically speaking, they did not possess any dominant value determination. According to a 2016 opinion poll conducted by Nova srpska politička misao, most of its supporters were over 60 years old, while only 12% of its supporters were highly educated.

== Organisation ==
SNS has a presidency which acts as the operational and political body of the party; it is composed of 30 members. It also has a main board and an executive board. The current president of SNS is Miloš Vučević, who was elected in 2023; Jorgovanka Tabaković is the deputy president. Aleksandar Šapić, Ana Brnabić, Marko Đurić, Nevena Đurić, Irena Vujović, Siniša Mali, and Vladimir Orlić are the current vice-presidents of SNS; all of them were elected in 2021 and re-elected in 2023, except Vujović, who was not elected in 2021. Milenko Jovanov headed the SNS parliamentary group from 2022 until the dissolution of the National Assembly in September 2026; in the 15th National Assembly, the group is led by Vučić, with Jovanov as his deputy. Darko Glišić is the president of the party's executive board.

The headquarters of SNS is located at Palmira Toljatija 5/3 in Belgrade. SNS publishes SNS Informator, the party's newspaper. It also has a youth and women's wing. SNS also operates the For the Serbian People and State Foundation, which it formed in 2019. SNS has received most of its support because of Vučić; an opinion poll conducted by Faktor Plus in December 2014 noted that 80% of SNS voters would not vote for SNS if someone else than Vučić was the head of the party. With at least 800,000 members as of 2020, SNS is the largest political party in Europe by membership as of 2019. N1 reported in 2024 that SNS had 700,000 members.

Petronijević Terzić has stated in 2023 that SNS has used local self-government bodies for party purposes and funds of local public companies for party gatherings, rallies, and promotions. Transparency Serbia has also reported that during the 2016 parliamentary election campaign period SNS has used official events, such as the opening of private factories, to spread their election messages.

=== International cooperation ===
In 2011, SNS signed a cooperation agreement with the Freedom Party of Austria. SNS also cooperated with Fidesz, the ruling party of Hungary; Fidesz members attended an SNS rally in 2019. In 2014, it was reported that SNS had ties with the New Serb Democracy in Montenegro, while SNS officials also attended a Democratic Party of Socialists (DPS) rally in 2015. SNS has been accused of "practically running" the Serb List in Kosovo, while Vučić has been also accused of being "figure behind" the party.

SNS representatives in the Parliamentary Assembly of the Council of Europe (PACE) joined the European People's Party (EPP) in 2013. In the same year, SNS received support from the Christian Democratic Union of Germany (CDU) due to the establishment of the Brussels Agreement. SNS has received support from the CDU in regards to membership in the EPP in 2015. A year later, SNS and its youth wing became associate members of EPP. SNS officials attended CDU's congress in 2018. In 2025, Vučević met with a CDU member. However, in September 2025, Manfred Weber, the president of the EPP, announced that the party will discuss the membership of SNS due to their response to the student-led anti-corruption protests. SNS became a member of the International Democracy Union in 2018. In the PACE, SNS was also affiliated with the Free Democrats Group; Dubravka Filipovski once served as its vice-chairperson.

In November 2026, it was reported that the EPP wanted to suspend the membership of SNS. The EPP also listed demands for the SNS to follow if it wanted to stay in the EPP. Cutting its ties with United Russia, supporting EU sanctions against Moscow, distancing SNS from the Chinese government and renewing its commitment to EU integration.

SNS took part in a meeting with Chinese Communist Party (CCP) officials in 2019. At the meeting, the parties "pledged to forge ever-closer links". SNS officials were also present in a 2021 summit that was organised by CCP, while in 2023 SNS described CCP as its inspiration. SNS established connections with United Russia (YeR) in 2010. Tomislav Nikolić was present at a YeR congress in 2011, while a year later, SNS officials were present at a YeR conference. Since then, SNS and YeR have signed several cooperation agreements, most recently being in 2021.

=== List of presidents ===
#	President		Birth–Death	Term start	Term end
1	Tomislav Nikolić	Official portrait of Tomislav Nikolić from 2012	1952–	21 October 2008	24 May 2012
2	Aleksandar Vučić	A photo of Aleksandar Vučić in June 2019	1970–	24 May 2012	27 May 2023
3	Miloš Vučević	A photo of Miloš Vučević in September 2024	1974–	27 May 2023	Incumbent

== Electoral performance ==
=== Parliamentary elections ===
National Assembly
Year	Leader	Popular vote	% of popular vote	#	# of seats	Seat change	Coalition	Status	Ref.
2012	Tomislav Nikolić	940,659	25.16%	1st	58 / 250	▲37	PS	Government	
2014	Aleksandar Vučić	1,736,920	49.96%	1st	128 / 250	▲70	AV–BKV	Government	
2016	Aleksandar Vučić	1,823,147	49.71%	1st	93 / 250	▼35	AV–SP	Government	
2020	Aleksandar Vučić	1,953,998	63.02%	1st	157 / 250	▲64	AV–ZND	Government	
2022	Aleksandar Vučić	1,635,101	44.27%	1st	95 / 250	▼62	AV–ZMS	Government	
2023	Miloš Vučević	1,783,701	48.07%	1st	105 / 250	▲10	AV–SNSDS	Government	
2026	Miloš Vučević	1,731,323	39.48%	▼2nd	92 / 250	▼13	AV–US	Opposition	

=== Presidential elections ===
President of Serbia
Year	Candidate	1st round popular vote		% of popular vote	2nd round popular vote		% of popular vote	Ref.
2012	Tomislav Nikolić	2nd	979,216	26.22%	1st	1,552,063	51.16%	
2017	Aleksandar Vučić	1st	2,012,788	56.01%	—N/a	—	—	
2022	Aleksandar Vučić	1st	2,224,914	60.01%	—N/a	—	—	

=== Provincial elections ===
Assembly of Vojvodina
Year	Leader	Popular vote	% of popular vote	#	# of seats	Seat change	Coalition	Status	Ref.
2012	Igor Mirović	185,311	19.26%	▲2nd	22 / 120	▲22	PV	Opposition	
2016	Igor Mirović	428,452	45.78%	▲1st	63 / 120	▲41	AV–SP	Government	
2020	Igor Mirović	498,495	61.58%	1st	65 / 120	▲2	AV–ZND	Government	
2023	Damir Zobenica	466,035	48.82%	1st	59 / 120	▼6	VNSDS	Government	

=== Belgrade City Assembly elections ===
City Assembly of Belgrade
Year	Leader	Popular vote	% of popular vote	#	# of seats	Seat change	Coalition	Status	Ref.
2012	Tomislav Nikolić	219,198	26.83%	▲2nd	37 / 110	▲37	PS	Opposition	
2014	Aleksandar Vučić	351,183	43.62%	▲1st	63 / 110	▲26	AV–BKV	Government	
2018	Aleksandar Vučić	366,461	44.99%	1st	64 / 110	▲1	ZSVB	Government	
2022	Aleksandar Vučić	348,345	38.83%	1st	36 / 110	▼28	AV–ZMS	Government	
2023	Miloš Vučević	367,239	39.93%	1st	40 / 110	▲4	BNSDS	Snap election	
2024	Miloš Vučević	387,326	53.79%	1st	45 / 110	▲5	BS	Government	
