= Milivoje Todorović =

Serbian politician

- Миливоје Тодоровић

Member of the Assembly of Vojvodina
- Incumbent
- Assumed office 9 February 2024

Personal details
- Born: 2 August 1984 (age 41)
- Party: SPO (until 2017); POKS (2017–present)

Milivoje Todorović (Serbian Cyrillic: Миливоје Тодоровић; born 2 August 1984) is a Serbian politician. He has served in the Vojvodina provincial assembly since February 2024 as a member of the Movement for the Restoration of the Kingdom of Serbia (POKS).

== Early life and career ==
Todorović is a graduated economist. He has worked in the private sector and for the public utility Čistoća in Novi Sad. He lives in Sremska Mitrovica.

== Politician ==
=== Serbian Renewal Movement ===
Todorović became politically active in 2007. In 2008, he was appointed president of the youth organization of the Serbian Renewal Movement (SPO) in Sremska Mitrovica. In the years that followed, he attended several seminars and trainings in the field of political education.

The SPO contested the 2012 local election in Sremska Mitrovica as part of an alliance called Preokret (English: U-Turn), and Todorović appeared in the second position on its electoral list. The list did not cross the electoral threshold for representation in the local assembly.

=== Movement for the Restoration of the Kingdom of Serbia ===
The SPO experienced a serious split in 2017, with several members leaving to form the Movement for the Restoration of the Kingdom of Serbia under the leadership of Žika Gojković. Todorović was among those who joined the new party.

The POKS fielded its own list in the 2020 Vojvodina provincial election. Todorović appeared in the eighth position and was not elected when the list won five seats. When the assembly dissolved for a new election in 2023, he was the next candidate in sequence slated to receive a mandate in the event of another POKS member leaving the assembly.

In late 2021, the POKS split into two rival factions, respectively led by Gojković and Vojislav Mihailović. Todorović initially sided with Gojković's faction, which at that time held the legal right to use the POKS name. Gojković's POKS contested the 2022 Serbian parliamentary election in an alliance with Dveri, and Todorović appeared in the thirty-second position on their combined list. The list won ten seats, and he was not elected. Gojković's faction dissolved soon after the election, and Mihailović's group won the rights to the POKS name. Todorović joined Mihailović's group at this time and remained with the party.

In May 2023, Todorović took part in a POKS delegation that visited the Luhansk People's Republic and the Donetsk People's Republic at the invitation of the president of the "Russia House" organization. He later wrote about his visit in the Serbian media, supporting what he described as the efforts of Russian inhabitants of the Donbass to defend their freedom from pro-western invaders.

The POKS is part of the National Democratic Alternative (NADA), a political coalition that also includes the New Democratic Party of Serbia (NDSS) and other parties. Todorović appeared in the 176th position on NADA's electoral list for the 2023 Serbian parliamentary election. Election from this position was not a realistic prospect, and he was not elected when the list won thirteen seats.

==== Provincial representative ====
Todorović appeared in the sixth position on NADA's list in the 2023 Vojvodina provincial election, which was held concurrently with the parliamentary vote, and was elected when the coalition won seven seats. The Serbian Progressive Party (SNS) and its allies won the election, and the NADA delegates serve in opposition. Todorović is a member of the committee for youth and sports and the committee for petitions and proposals.

He led a NADA coalition list in Sremska Mitrovica for the 2024 Serbian local elections. The list did not cross the electoral threshold for assembly representation.
