= Marija Vojinović =

Serbian politician

- Марија Војиновић

Member of the National Assembly of the Republic of Serbia
- In office 1 August 2022 – 6 February 2024

Personal details
- Born: Užice, SR Serbia, SFR Yugoslavia
- Party: POKS

Marija Vojinović (Serbian Cyrillic: Марија Војиновић; born 1980) is a Serbian politician. She served in the National Assembly of Serbia from 2022 to 2024 as a member of the Movement for the Restoration of the Kingdom of Serbia (POKS).

== Private life and career ==
Vojinović was born in Užice, in what was then the Socialist Republic of Serbia in the Socialist Federal Republic of Yugoslavia. She has completed undergraduate and master's studies in Belgrade and is a master manager in the service sector. She lives in Novi Sad, Vojvodina.

== Politician ==
Vojinović joined POKS on its formation in 2017 and is currently the secretary of its executive board. She received the fifth position on the party's electoral list in the 2020 Vojvodina provincial election and was elected to the Assembly of Vojvodina when the list won five mandates. She chose to decline her mandate, and the next candidate on the list, Novak Maksimović, was able to enter the assembly in her place. She also received the ninth position on the POKS list for the national assembly in the concurrent 2020 Serbian parliamentary election. The list narrowly missed crossing the electoral threshold to win assembly representation.

The POKS experienced a serious split in late 2021, and the party became divided into rival factions led by Vojislav Mihailović and Žika Gojković. Vojinović joined Mihailović's group, which contested the 2022 Serbian parliamentary election as part of the National Democratic Alternative (NADA) alliance. Due to an ongoing dispute over the party name, Mihailović's group could not be identified as the POKS; it instead used the name "For the Kingdom of Serbia (Monarchists)" during the election. Vojinović was given the fifth position on the alliance's list and was elected when it won fifteen mandates. Soon after the election, Mihailović was recognized as the legitimate leader of the POKS.

The Serbian Progressive Party (SNS) and its allies won the 2022 election, and the NADA alliance served in opposition. During her parliamentary term, Vojinović was a member of the health and family committee and a deputy member of the committee on the rights of the child and the committee on human and minority rights and gender equality.

Vojinović appeared in the fourth position on the NADA coalition's list in the 2023 Serbian parliamentary election and was re-elected when the list won thirteen seats. She resigned her mandate on 6 February 2024, the day that the new assembly convened. She also received the tenth position on NADA's list in the concurrent 2023 Vojvodina provincial election and was not elected when the list won seven mandates.
