= Dejan Šulkić =

Serbian politician

- Дејан Шулкић

Member of the National Assembly of the Republic of Serbia
- Incumbent
- Assumed office 1 August 2022
- In office 3 June 2016 – 3 August 2020

Substitute Member of the Parliamentary Assembly of the Council of Europe
- In office 10 October 2022 – 14 April 2024

Mayor of Velika Plana
- In office 2004 – 25 August 2015
- Preceded by: Goran Rakovac
- Succeeded by: Igor Matković

Personal details
- Born: 22 October 1972 (age 53) Velika Plana, SR Serbia, SFR Yugoslavia
- Party: NDSS (formerly DSS)
- Education: University of Kragujevac

Dejan Šulkić (Serbian Cyrillic: Дејан Шулкић; born 22 October 1972) is a Serbian politician. He was the mayor of Velika Plana from 2004 to 2015 and is currently serving his third term as a member of the National Assembly of Serbia. Šulkić is a member of the New Democratic Party of Serbia (NDSS), which was known until May 2022 as the Democratic Party of Serbia (DSS).

== Early life and career ==
Šulkić was born in Velika Plana, in what was then the Socialist Republic of Serbia in the Socialist Federal Republic of Yugoslavia. He is a graduate of the University of Kragujevac Faculty of Law, and he was the director of JP "Plana" in Velika Plana in the early 2000s.

== Politician ==
=== Mayor of Velika Plana ===
Serbia introduced the direct election of mayors for the 2004 local elections. Šulkić ran as the DSS's candidate in Velika Plana and was elected in the second round of voting.

The direct election of mayors was abandoned after a single cycle and replaced by indirect election by the elected members of Serbia's municipal assemblies. Šulkić led the DSS to victories in Velika Plana in the 2008 and 2012 local elections and was in both cases confirmed for a new term as mayor afterward. He was removed from office in August 2015, when the local Democratic Party (DS) board ended its alliance with the DSS and formed a new coalition government with the Serbian Progressive Party (SNS). In leaving office, Šulkić took credit for careful financial management over the previous eleven years. (The Democratic Party leadership did not approve of the local board's decision to align with the SNS and dissolved the board shortly thereafter.)

The DSS contested the 2016 local elections in Velika Plana in an alliance with the Strength of Serbia Movement (PSS) and the Serbian Renewal Movement (SPO). Šulkić led the alliance's electoral list and was re-elected to the municipal assembly when the list won seven mandates. The SNS won a majority victory with twenty-two seats, and the DSS served in opposition.

=== Politics at the Republic Level ===
Šulkić received the 219th position (out of 250) on the DSS's electoral list in the 2003 Serbian parliamentary election. The list won fifty-three mandates, and he was not included in his party's assembly delegation. (From 2000 to 2011, Serbian parliamentary mandates were awarded to sponsoring parties or coalitions rather than individual candidates, and it was common practice for the mandates to be assigned out of numerical order. Šulkić could have been selected for a mandate despite his low position on the list, although ultimately he was not.)

Serbia's electoral system was reformed in 2011, such that parliamentary mandates were awarded to candidates on successful lists in numerical order. Šulkić received the fifty-second position on the DSS's list in the 2012 parliamentary election and was not elected when the list won twenty-two mandates. He was chosen as president of the DSS's executive board in June 2015.

==== Parliamentarian (2016–20, 2022–present) ====
The DSS contested the 2016 Serbian parliamentary election in an alliance with Dveri. Šulkić received the sixth position on their combined list and was this time elected to the national assembly when the list won thirteen mandates. The Progressive Party and its allies won the election, and the DSS served in opposition.

The DSS experienced a serious split in late 2016, following which Šulkić, Gorica Gajić, and Milan Lapčević were the only delegates in the national assembly to remain with the party; as five members are needed to form a parliamentary group, all served as independents. In May 2017, Šulkić was chosen as one of the DSS's three vice-presidents. During the 2016–20 parliament, he was a member of the committee on constitutional and legislative issues and the committee on the diaspora and Serbs in the region, a deputy member of the labour committee, (Note: Formally known as the Committee on Labour, Social Issues, Social Inclusion, and Poverty Reduction.) and a member of the parliamentary friendship groups with Montenegro, North Macedonia, and Slovenia. He articulated several criticisms of Serbia's parliamentary culture, and what he described as the loss of democratic freedoms under Aleksandar Vučić's rule, in a 2020 interview with Danas.

The DSS formed an electoral alliance called METLA 2020 in late 2019, and Šulkić received the fourth position on its list in the 2020 parliamentary election. The list did not cross the electoral threshold for assembly representation. In Velika Plana, the alliance's list in the concurrent 2020 local elections was called "METLA 2020 - Dejan B. Šulkić"; notwithstanding this, Šulkić only appeared in the twelfth position (out of fourteen) and was not re-elected when the list won three mandates.

In 2021, the DSS co-founded the National Democratic Alternative (NADA), an alliance of national conservative parties in Serbia. Šulkić appeared in the sixth position on NADA's electoral list in the 2022 Serbian parliamentary election and was elected to a second national assembly term when the list won fifteen seats. The Progressives and their allies won a plurality victory and remained the dominant force in Serbia's coalition government, and the DSS (renamed as the NDSS after the election) remained in opposition. In his second term, Šulkić was a member of the judiciary committee (Note: Formally known as the Committee on the Judiciary, Public Administration, and Local Self-Government.) and a deputy member of the security services control committee and the committee on constitutional and legislative issues. He was also appointed as a deputy member of Serbia's delegation to the Parliamentary Assembly of the Council of Europe (PACE), where he was an alternate on the committee on migration, refugees, and displaced persons.

Šulkić was given the seventh position on NADA's list in the 2023 Serbian parliamentary election and was re-elected when the list won thirteen seats. The SNS and its allies this time won a majority victory, and the NDSS once again serves in opposition. As in the previous parliament, Šulkić is a member of the judiciary committee and a deputy member of the security services control committee. He was not re-appointed to the PACE, and his term in that body ended on 14 April 2014.

He received the lead position on the NADA coalition's list for Velika Plana in the 2023 Serbian local elections and was re-elected to the local assembly when the list won six seats. The SNS and its allies won a majority government, and the NDSS serves in opposition at this level as well.

== Electoral record ==
=== Local (Velika Plana) ===
2004 Municipality of Velika Plana local election: Mayor of Velika Plana
Candidate	Party	First round		Second round	
Candidate	Party	Votes	%	Votes	%
Dejan Šulkić	Democratic Party of Serbia			5,767	62.09
Nebojša Todorović	Democratic Party			3,521	37.91
Slobodan Milosavljević	Serbian Radical Party				
other candidates					
Total				9,288	100.00
