= Gorica Gajić =

Serbian politician

- Горица Гајић

Member of the National Assembly of the Republic of Serbia
- In office 1 August 2022 – 6 February 2024
- In office 3 June 2016 – 3 August 2020
- In office 26 July 2012 – 16 April 2014

Member of the Assembly of Serbia and Montenegro
- In office 5 March 2004 – 3 June 2006

Personal details
- Born: 1 January 1958 (age 68)
- Party: NDSS (formerly DSS)

Gorica Gajić (Serbian Cyrillic: Горица Гајић; born 1 January 1958) is a Serbian politician who has served three terms in the National Assembly of Serbia. She is a member of the New Democratic Party of Serbia (NDSS), which was known until May 2022 as the Democratic Party of Serbia (DSS).

== Private life ==
Gajić lives in Svilajnac and is a graduated economist.

== Politician ==
Gajić joined the DSS on its formation in 1992.

=== Member of the Federal Assembly (2004–06) ===
Gajić received the 119th position on the DSS's electoral list in the 2003 Serbian parliamentary election. The list won fifty-three seats, and she was not afterward included in the party's national assembly delegation. (From 2000 to 2011, Serbian parliamentary mandates were awarded to sponsoring parties or coalitions rather than to individual candidates, and it was common practice for mandates to be assigned out of numerical order. Gajić could have been given a mandate despite her list position, though ultimately she was not.)

By virtue of its performance in the 2003 parliamentary election, the DSS had the right to appoint twenty delegates to the Assembly of Serbia and Montenegro in early 2004. Gajić was included in her party's delegation and served on the federal assembly's committee for internal economic affairs and finance. The assembly ceased to exist in 2006, when Montenegro declared independence.

=== Member of the National Assembly (three terms between 2012 and 2024) ===
The DSS contested the 2007 and 2008 Serbian parliamentary elections in an alliance with New Serbia (NS). Gajić was included both times on the coalition's electoral list but was not chosen for a mandate on either occasion.

Serbia's electoral system was reformed in 2011, such that all parliamentary mandates were awarded to candidates on successful lists in numerical order. Gajić received the twenty-fourth position on the DSS's list in the 2012 parliamentary election and was not immediately elected when the party won twenty-one seats. After the resignation of other candidates further up the list, she received a mandate on 26 July 2012. The Serbian Progressive Party (SNS) won the election and afterward formed a coalition government with the Socialist Party of Serbia (SPS) and other parties, while the DSS served in opposition. During her first term in the national assembly, Gajić was a member of the spatial planning committee, (Note: Formally known as the Committee on Spatial Planning, Transport, Telecommunications, and Infrastructure.) a deputy member of the labour committee, (Note: Formally known as the Committee on Labour, Social Issues, Social Inclusion, and Poverty Reduction.) and a member of the parliamentary friendship groups with France and Hungary.

She was promoted to the fifteenth position on the DSS's list for the 2014 election. On this occasion, the list did not cross the electoral threshold for assembly representation. Gajić was elected to the DSS presidency in October 2014.

The DSS contested the 2016 parliamentary election in alliance with Dveri. Gajić received the eighth position on their combined list and was elected to a second term when the list won thirteen seats. The SNS and its allies won a majority victory, and the DSS again served in opposition. In the 2016–20 parliament, Gajić was a member of the economy committee (Note: Formally known as the Committee on the Economy, Regional Development, Trade, Tourism, and Energy.) and the labour committee, a deputy member of the finance committee (Note: Formally known as the Committee on Finance, State Budget, and Control of Public Spending.) and the committee on the rights of the child, and a member of the parliamentary friendship groups with France, Greece, and Russia.

The DSS experienced a serious split in late 2016, after which Gajić, Milan Lapčević, and Dejan Šulkić were the only assembly members who remained with the party. Lapčević subsequently left the party as well. In 2019, Gajić criticized the parties of the opposition Alliance for Serbia for boycotting the assembly, describing their decision as rushed and ultimately counterproductive.

The DSS created a new alliance called METLA 2020 for the 2020 Serbian parliamentary election, and Gajić appeared in the third position on its list. The list did not cross the electoral threshold. The following year, the DSS and the Movement for the Restoration of the Kingdom of Serbia (POKS) formed a coalition called the National Democratic Alternative (NADA). Gajić received the fourth position on the coalition's list in the 2022 parliamentary election and was elected to a third term when the list won fifteen seats. The Progressives and their allies once again won the election, and the DSS (renamed as the NDSS after the election) remained in opposition.

In her third assembly term, Gajić was a member of the labour committee and a deputy member of the education committee, (Note: Formally known as the Committee on Education, Science, Technological Development, and the Information Society.) the health and family committee, and the committee on the rights of the child.

She appeared in the twenty-first position on the NADA coalition's list in the 2023 Serbian parliamentary election and was not re-elected when the list fell to thirteen seats. Her term ended when the new assembly convened in February 2024. She is currently the fourth NDSS-endorsed candidate in sequence with the right to enter the assembly as a replacement delegate in the event of a vacancy.

=== Local politics ===
Gajić has served a number of terms in the Svilajnac municipal assembly. She was the DSS's candidate for mayor in the 2004 Serbian local elections, in which mayors were directly elected. Although unsuccessful in that contest, she was chosen afterward as the municipality's deputy mayor and served in this role for the next four years.

Gajić appeared in the lead position on the DSS's list for Svilajnac in the 2012 Serbian local elections and was re-elected when the list won three mandates. She later led a DSS–Dveri list in the 2016 local elections; this list did not cross the threshold. In the 2020 Serbian local elections, she was re-elected to the municipal assembly on the list of an alliance called "Only Forward Svilajnac," which won two seats.

== Electoral record ==
=== Local (Svilajnac) ===
2004 Svilajnac municipal election: Mayor of Svilajnac
Candidate	Party	Votes	%
Dobrivoje Budimirović	Citizens' Group: For a Rich Municipality of Svilajnac	7,127	55.85
Milija Jovanović (incumbent)	Democratic Party	1,624	12.73
Gorica Gajić	Democratic Party of Serbia	1,579	12.37
Mića Nešić	G17 Plus	852	6.68
Branislav Marinković	Serbian Renewal Movement–Citizen's Group: PP	794	6.22
Radovan Radosavljević	Strength of Serbia Movement	440	3.45
Staniša Strainović	Socialist Party of Serbia	232	1.82
Ljubiša Radosavljević	People's Democratic Party–Democratic Movement of Romanians of Serbia	114	0.89
Total		12,762	100.00
