= Milovan Jakovljević =

Serbian politician

- Милован Јаковљевић

Member of the National Assembly of the Republic of Serbia
- In office 1 August 2022 – 6 February 2024

Personal details
- Born: 28 September 1967 (age 58)
- Party: Dveri

Milovan Jakovljević (Serbian Cyrillic: Милован Јаковљевић; born 28 September 1967) is a Serbian politician. He served in the Serbian parliament from 2022 to 2024 and is now a member of the Ivanjica municipal assembly. Jakovljević is a member of Dveri.

== Private career ==
Jakovljević is a graduated economist and war veteran living in Ivanjica. He is a raspberry producer and owns the fire protection company Plamen.

== Politician ==
=== Early years (2012–22) ===
Jakovljević joined Dveri in 2012, became president of its Ivanjica board in 2014, and became the party's coordinator for the Zlatibor District in 2016. He was elected to the party presidency in 2018 and has served as a party vice-president.

Dveri ran a combined electoral list with the Democratic Party of Serbia (DSS) in Ivanjica for the 2016 Serbian local elections, and Jakovljević appeared in the second position. The list narrowly missed crossing the electoral threshold for representation in the local assembly.

=== Parliamentarian (2022–24) ===
Dveri ran a combined list with Žika Gojković's branch of the Movement for the Restoration of the Kingdom of Serbia (POKS) in the 2022 Serbian parliamentary election. Jakovljević appeared in the sixth position on the list and was elected when the alliance won ten seats. The Serbian Progressive Party (SNS) and its allies won a majority victory, and Dveri served in opposition for the term that followed. Jakovljević was a member of the agriculture committee, (Note: Formally known as the Agriculture, Forestry, and Water Management Committee.) the chair of a sustainable development subcommittee, (Note: Formally known as the Subcommittee for Sustainable Development, Agricultural Cooperatives and Cooperative Association of Farmers.) and a member of a subcommittee for monitoring the agricultural situation in marginal areas. (Note: Formally known as the subcommittee for monitoring the agricultural situation in marginal/least developed areas of the Republic of Serbia/areas with difficult working conditions in agriculture.) He was also a deputy member of the defence and internal affairs committee and a member of the parliamentary friendship groups with Belarus, Bosnia and Herzegovina, the Czech Republic, Italy, Montenegro, North Macedonia, Russia, Slovakia, Slovenia, Sri Lanka, and Turkey.

In April 2023, Jakovljević said that Serbia should improve anti-hail protection for farmers and increase subsidies for crop insurance. He also criticized the lack of regulation and long-term planning in Serbia's raspberry market and called for greater protections, including a ban on the re-export of raspberries imported under the Serbian brand.

For the 2023 parliamentary election, Dveri fielded a combined list with the far-right Serbian Party Oathkeepers (SSZ), and Jakovljević again appeared in the sixth position. The list did not cross the threshold for assembly representation, and his term ended when the new assembly convened in early 2024.

=== Municipal representative (2024–present) ===
Dveri did not field an electoral list in Ivanjica for the 2024 Serbian local elections, but Jakovljević led an independent list called the Household List of Working People and was elected when it won a single seat. The Progressives and their allies won a majority victory, and he once again serves in opposition.
