= Novak Maksimović =

Serbian politician

Novak Maksimović (Serbian Cyrillic: Новак Максимовић; born 1973) is a politician in Serbia. He was elected to the Assembly of Vojvodina in the 2020 provincial election as a member of the Movement for the Restoration of the Kingdom of Serbia (Pokret obnove Kraljevine Srbije, POKS).

== Private career ==
Maksimović is an economist. He lives in Novi Sad.

== Politician ==
Maksimović entered political life as a member of the Serbian Renewal Movement (Srpski pokret obnove, SPO). This party contested the 2016 Serbian local elections in Novi Sad on the electoral list of the Serbian Progressive Party (Srpska napredna stranka, SNS), and Maksimović was awarded the seventy-fourth position. The list won thirty-eight seats. Maksimović was not elected and did not serve in the sitting of the local assembly that followed. He did, however, serve as president of the local community of Budisava in the city.

The SPO experienced a split in 2017, and several dissident members left the party to form the POKS. Maksimović joined the new party and became its commissioner for Budisava. He is now a member of the party's main board and co-ordinator for the South Bačka District.

Maksimović received the sixth position on the POKS list for the 2020 provincial election. The list won five seats, and he was not initially elected; he was, however, awarded a mandate on 24 July 2020 as a replacement for fifth-ranked candidate Marija Vojinović, who declined to serve. He is now a member of the committee on issues of constitutional and legal status of the province, the committee on urban and spatial planning and environmental protection, and the committee on youth and sports.

He also received the fifty-sixth position on the POKS list for the National Assembly of Serbia in the 2020 Serbian parliamentary election. The list missed the electoral threshold to win seats in the assembly.
