= Monarchism in Serbia =

Flag of the Kingdom of Serbia

Monarchism in Serbia details the history of monarchist government in the country and its predecessors, and encompasses modern advocacy of restoring Serbia's form of government to a constitutional monarchy. Monarchy in Serbia was abolished after World War II with the deposition of Peter II of Yugoslavia by the new communist government of Josip Broz Tito.

Alexander, Crown Prince of Yugoslavia, head of the Karađorđević dynasty, the most recent former royal house of the Kingdom of Yugoslavia and Kingdom of Serbia, is a proponent of re-creating a constitutional monarchy in Serbia and sees himself as the rightful king. He believes that the monarchy could give Serbia "stability, continuity and unity".

== History ==
Serbia as an independent territory was ruled under a monarchy from its obtaining autonomy and subsequently independence from the Ottoman Empire in the early 19th century until the installation of the provisional government of the Partisans-led Democratic Federal Yugoslavia in the mid-1940s, first as Revolutionary Serbia, then as the Principality of Serbia, Kingdom of Serbia, and finally a part of the Kingdom of Yugoslavia. After being forced to flee and form a government-in-exile following the Axis invasion of the country in 1941, the monarchy was officially abolished following the end of World War II, giving rise to the Socialist Federal Republic of Yugoslavia.

== Movement to restore the monarchy ==
Serbian Chetniks meeting in Ravna Gora in 2004

The Centre for Research of Orthodox Monarchism is a Serbian monarchist association from Belgrade, founded in 2001 and registered with the Ministry of Justice of Federal Republic of Yugoslavia in May 2002.

Following Montenegro's successful independence referendum on 21 May 2006, the re-creation of the Serbian monarchy found its way into daily political debate. A monarchist proposal for the new Serbian constitution has been published alongside other proposals. The document approved in October 2006 is a republican one. The Serbian people have not had a chance to vote on the system of government.

The Crown Prince raised the issue of a royal restoration in the immediate aftermath of the vote. In a press release issued on 24 May 2006 he stated:

It has been officially confirmed that the people of Montenegro voted for independence. I am sad, but I wish our Montenegrin brothers peace, democracy and happiness. The people of Montenegro are our brothers and sisters no matter what if we live in one or in two countries, that is how it was and that is how it will be forever.

I strongly believe in a Constitutional Parliamentary Kingdom of Serbia. Again, we need to be proud, a strong Serbia that is at peace with itself and with its neighbors. We were a proud, respected and happy country in the days of my great grandfather King Peter I. So, we can do it! Only if we have a form of governance close to the Serbian soul: the Kingdom of Serbia.

Simply, the King is above daily politics, he is the guardian of national unity, political stability and continuity of the state. In Constitutional Parliamentary Monarchies the King is the protector of public interest: there is no personal or party interest. What is most important is the interest of Serbia.

I am ready to meet all our politicians; we have to work together for the common good of Serbia, and to be friends in the name of the future of our country. I appeal for the end of the continuous political wrangling, division and arguments. I appeal for mature democratic debate in the interest of Serbia. Serbia must have clear and realistic objectives.

A number of political parties and organizations support a constitutional parliamentary monarchy in Serbia. The Serbian Orthodox Church has openly supported the restoration of the monarchy.

In 2017 an NGO, the Kingdom of Serbia Association announced that in 2016 they had collected over 123,000 signatures of support for a referendum on restoring the monarchy, short of the 150,000 needed to force a constitutional amendment.

== Polling ==
In 2011 an online open access poll by Serbian middle-market tabloid newspaper Blic showed that 64% of Serbians support restoring the monarchy.

Another poll in May 2013 had 39% of Serbians supporting the monarchy, with 32% against it. The public also had reservations with Alexander's apparent lack of knowledge of the Serbian language.

On 27 July 2015, newspaper Blic published a poll "Should Serbia be a monarchy?", 49.8% respondents expressed support in a reconstitution of monarchy, 44.6% were opposed and 5.5% were indifferent.

== Acts by monarchists ==
=== Kosovo ===
In 2017 the Serbian monarchist group the Order of the Dragon published a picture of its members on a hilltop in Kosovo wearing tactical vests, and military fatigues while flying drones. The Balkan Investigative Reporting Network investigated the group and uncovered a "constellation" of loosely linked groups attempting to equip and prepare Kosovo Serbs with Russian military equipment claiming that a Kosovar attempt to cleanse the Serb minority is "looming", although no evidence exists that any such operation is planned. The Belgrade based Order of the Dragon was also revealed to be financed by British far-right activist Jim Dowson and have been in contact with Russian far-right political theorist Alexander Dugin.

=== Ukraine ===
Bratislav Živković led a Chetnik military unit as volunteers on the side of Russia during their invasion of Ukraine. Before this he had been arrested in 2018 in Serbia for being part of the Russian forces that took control of Crimea when Moscow illegally annexed Ukraine's peninsula in 2014. His activities were in open violation of international laws and sought to spread Serbian influence and he built a reputation as one of the most prominent extremists in the Balkans. Živković would be killed in action on 3 January 2025 during the Kursk offensive.

== Parties ==
- Serbian Renewal Movement (1990–present)
- New Serbia (1998–present)
- Movement for the Restoration of the Kingdom of Serbia (2017–present)
- New Face of Serbia (2022–present)
