= Duško Kočalka =

Serbian politician (born 1971)

Duško Kočalka (Serbian Cyrillic: Душко Кочалка; born 18 September 1971) is a politician in Serbia. He has served in the Assembly of Vojvodina since November 2020 as a member of the Movement for the Restoration of the Kingdom of Serbia (Pokret obnove Kraljevine Srbije, POKS).

== Private career ==
Kočalka has a high school diploma and has been an entrepreneur in Žitište since 2004.

== Politician ==
=== Municipal politics ===
Kočalka began his political career as a member of the Serbian Renewal Movement (Srpski pokret obnove, SPO). He received the second position on a combined electoral list of the SPO and New Serbia for the Žitište municipal assembly in the 2008 Serbian local elections and was awarded a mandate when the list won three seats. (From 2000 to 2011, mandates in Serbian elections were awarded to sponsoring parties or coalitions rather than individual candidates, and it was common practice for the mandates to be awarded out of alphabetical order. Kočalka did not automatically receive a mandate by virtue of his list position, but he was awarded a mandate all the same.) He subsequently resigned from the assembly to serve as an assistant to the mayor.

Serbia's electoral system was revised in 2011, such that mandates were awarded in numerical order to candidates on successful lists. Kočalka received the sixth position in the 2016 local elections on a coalition list led by the Democratic Party and the Social Democratic Party and was re-elected when the list won eight mandates.

Koćalka joined the POKS after its formation in 2017. He appeared in the lead position on the party's list for Žitište in the 2020 local elections and was re-elected when the list won two mandates. He continues to serve in the local assembly.

=== At the republic level ===
Kočalka appeared in the 138th position on the SPO–New Serbia coalition list for the 2003 Serbian parliamentary election. The list won twenty-two mandates, and he was not included in the SPO's parliamentary delegation. He later received the twenty-second position on the POKS's For the Kingdom of Serbia list in the 2020 Serbian parliamentary election. The list narrowly missed crossing the electoral threshold to win representation in the assembly.

=== Provincial ===
The SPO contested the 2012 Vojvodina provincial election in an alliance with the Liberal Democratic Party known as Preokret and generally referred to in English as U-Turn. Kočalka received the fifty-second position on its electoral list. The list did not win any proportional mandates.

He was given the seventh position on the POKS list in the 2020 Vojvodina provincial election and narrowly missed direct election when the list won five mandates. He was awarded a mandate on 2 November 2020 as a replacement for fellow party member Bojana Jelić.
