= Aleksandar Jerković =

Serbian politician

- Александар Јерковић
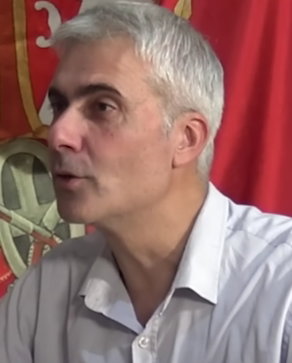
- Jerković in 2023

Member of the National Assembly
- Incumbent
- Assumed office 18 October 2022

Personal details
- Born: 1972 (age 52–53); Belgrade, SR Serbia, SFR Yugoslavia
- Political party: NN–IJS (2022—present)
- Occupation: Politician

Aleksandar Jerković (Serbian Cyrillic: Александар Јерковић; born 1972) is a Serbian politician who has been a member of the National Assembly since 18 October 2022. A close associate of Božidar Delić, he succeeded Delić as the leader of the There's no Going Back – Serbia Is Behind (NN–IJS) political organization.

== Early life, education and career ==
Jerković was born in 1972 in Belgrade, SR Serbia, SFR Yugoslavia.

According to Jerković, he gained a degree in mechanical engineering, majoring in weaponry. He has been involved in elections and campaigns for over 20 years and worked for many political parties in Serbia.

== Political career ==
According to Vreme, Jerković was a member of multiple political parties such as the Democratic Party of Serbia (DSS), G17 Plus and was allegedly one of the founders of the populist Serbian Progressive Party (SNS) and a member of its executive board, later joining the Serbian Radical Party (SRS).

He was a close associate of General Božidar Delić and founded the right-wing There's no Going Back – Serbia Is Behind (NN–IJS) political organization along with Delić.

In the 2022 parliamentary election, Jerković appeared on the National Democratic Alternative (NADA) electoral list which consisted of the New Democratic Party of Serbia (NDSS), Movement for the Restoration of the Kingdom of Serbia (POKS) and the Bunjevci Citizens of Serbia (BGS) parties. Jerković was registered as a candidate of BGS. Jerković failed to get elected to the National Assembly but succeeded Delić following his death and was sworn in as MP on 18 October 2022. In December 2022, Jerković split with NADA's leadership, leaving its parliamentary group and accusing NDSS president Miloš Jovanović of collaborating with the ruling SNS.

As a member of the National Assembly, Jerković was actively posting political posts on TikTok, gaining more popularity. In March 2023, he claimed to have been attacked in Košutnjak.

He took part in the Serbia Against Violence protests in 2023.

In the 2023 Belgrade City Assembly election, Jerković led the right-wing populist We–The Voice from the People list (MI–GIN), was its mayoral candidate and was elected to the City Assembly of Belgrade. He later split with MI–GIN leadership with them accusing Jerković of siding with SNS.
