= Dobrivoje Budimirović =

Serbian politician (born 1947)

Dobrivoje Budimirović (Serbian Cyrillic: Добривоје Будимировић; born 5 January 1947), commonly known as Bidža, is a retired politician in Serbia. He was the mayor of Svilajnac for most of the period from 1989 to 2008 and also served in the Serbian and Yugoslavian parliaments. For many years a member of the Socialist Party of Serbia (Socijalistička partija Srbije, SPS), he later started his own political movement and is now a member of the Serbian Progressive Party (Srpska napredna stranka, SNS).

== Early life and career ==
Budimirović was born in the village of Lukovica near Svilajnac, in what was then the People's Republic of Serbia in the Federal People's Republic of Yugoslavia. He graduated from the Faculty of Agriculture in Belgrade and later worked in a co-operative and for the company Agroeksport. Beginning in 1980, he served for a number of years as director of the Agricultural School.

In 2013, Budimirović took part in a reality television show called Farmers. The following year, his home was seriously damaged in the 2014 Southeast Europe floods. In 2020, it was reported that he was cultivating one-and-a-half hectares of farmland, where he grew wheat, corn, and alfalfa, and was still busy with a variety of domestic and international projects.

He once saved his leg from gangrene by amputating an infected toe with vineyard shears.

== Politician ==
=== The Miloševic Years (1987–2000) ===
Budimirović was a personal associate of Slobodan Milošević during the latter's political ascension in Serbia and has remained a defender of Milošević's political legacy. He has said that he persuaded Milošević to marry Mirjana Marković (of whom he was significantly less fond) in a church ceremony, in order to build popular support for their union.

When Slobodan Milošević was chosen as president of the Federal Republic of Yugoslavia in July 1997, Budimirović and fellow Socialist parliamentarian Radovan Radović sang a duet in praise of Milošević in the national assembly, with the words, "Slobodane, Slobodane ti si ko komunista, volimo te, volimo te ko Isusa Hrista." (English: "Slobodan, Slobodan, you are a communist. We love you, we love you like Jesus Christ.")

==== Mayor of Svilajnac (1989–2000) ====
Budimorović first became mayor of Svilajnac following the 1989 Serbian local elections, the last to be held when Serbia was still a one-party socialist state. The following year, multi-party democracy was re-introduced and Budimirović became a member of Milošević's SPS. He continued in office as mayor after the May 1992, December 1992, and 1996 Serbian local elections. In this role, he was a colourful and often bombastic figure, and was derided in some circles as a crude political boss. He has described his mayoralty as a time of unprecedented growth for the community, pointing to the construction of the maternity hospital and the gasification of the town as being among his successes.

When sanctions were imposed against Yugoslavia in the context of the Yugoslav wars of the 1990s, Budimirović responded by legalizing the sale of smuggled cigarettes in the municipality. Officials from Belgrade who had arrived to confiscate the contraband cigarettes were required to return them.

==== Parliamentarian (1990–2001) ====
Budimirović was elected to the National Assembly of Serbia for the Svilajnac division in the 1990 parliamentary election. The Socialist Party won a majority victory, and he served as a government supporter when the assembly convened in early 1991.

Serbia introduced a system of proportional representation for republic-level elections in 1992. Budimirović was given the ninth position on the SPS's electoral list in Smederevo for the December 1992 parliamentary election and was awarded a mandate when the list won ten seats. (From 1992 to 2000, Serbia's electoral law stipulated that one-third of parliamentary mandates would be assigned to candidates on successful lists in numerical order, while the remaining two-thirds would be distributed amongst other candidates at the discretion of sponsoring parties or coalitions. Budimirović did not receive an automatic mandate, though he was included in the SPS's delegation all the same.) The Socialists won a minority victory in 1992 and initially governed in an informal alliance with the far-right Serbian Radical Party (Srpska radikalna stranka, SRS).

This SPS–SRS alliance broke down in mid-1993, and another parliamentary election was held in December of that year. Budimirović received the sixth position on the SPS's list in Smederevo and was again granted a mandate when the list won eleven seats. The Socialists increased their seat total in this election and afterward formed a new administration with New Democracy (Nova Demokratija, ND).

In 1994, Mirjana Marković started a political party called the Yugoslav Left (Jugoslovenska Levica, JUL), which largely operated in an alliance with Milošević's SPS. Budimirović, who opposed the alliance, personally intervened to prevent the JUL from starting a local branch in Svilajnac. There was some speculation that he would afterward be excluded as a SPS candidate in the 1997 parliamentary election, but he was ultimately given the third position on the party's coalition list in the smaller, redistributed division on Jagodina. The list won three seats in the division, and he was again chosen for a mandate.

In May 2000, Budimirović was chosen as part of the Serbian assembly's delegation to the Chamber of Republics in the parliament of the Federal Republic of Yugoslavia. He served until the first direct elections for the chamber took place in September of the same year.

Milošević was defeated by Vojislav Koštunica of the Democratic Opposition of Serbia (Demokratska opozicija Srbije, DOS) in the 2000 Yugoslavian general election, an event that precipitated widespread political changes in Serbia and Yugoslavia. The DOS also won a narrow victory in Svilajnac in the concurrent 2000 Serbian local elections, and Budimirović afterward stood down as mayor.

A new Serbian parliamentary election was held later in 2000; prior to the vote, Serbia's electoral system was reformed such that the entire country became a single electoral division and all mandates were awarded to candidates on successful lists at the discretion of the sponsoring parties or coalitions, irrespective of numerical order. Budimirović was included in the sixteenth position on the SPS's list, which was mostly alphabetical. The list won thirty-seven seats. He was not awarded a new mandate, and his parliamentary term ended when the new assembly convened in January 2001.

=== Since 2000 ===
Out of the office, Budimirović faced a number of legal challenges in Svilajnac. In June 2004, he was convicted of negligence in the use of municipal funds and sentenced to three months in prison. The sentence was not final, and he had the right of appeal; ultimately, he did not serve any time in jail.

The SPS experienced serious internal divisions in 2002, largely over the question of Milošević's leadership. Budimirović supported the party's decision to hold an extraordinary congress; in the buildup to this event, he described himself as a continued supporter of Milošević. The party subsequently split, and Budimirović became a vice-president of the breakaway Socialist People's Party (Socijalistička narodna stranka, SNS). He led the party's electoral list in the 2003 Serbian parliamentary election; the list did not cross the electoral threshold to win representation in the assembly.

Serbia briefly introduced the direct election of mayors in the 2004 local elections. Budimirović ran in Svilajnac as the candidate of his own citizens' group and was re-elected by a landslide, serving in office for the next four years. He survived a recall election in 2007; he had promised to retire to a monastery if defeated.

The Socialist People's Party participated in the 2007 Serbian parliamentary election on a coalition electoral list led by the Party of United Pensioners of Serbia (Partija ujedinjenih penzionera Srbije, PUPS) and the Social Democratic Party (Socijaldemokratska partija, SDP). Budimirović was given the thirty-first position on the coalition list, which failed to cross the electoral threshold. His local list was defeated in the 2008 local elections in Svilajnac, and his final term as mayor came to an end in that year.

He later joined the Progressive Party and served on its main board. In 2016, he took part in a local protest against a project for the treatment of medical waste in Svilajnac.

== Electoral record ==
=== Municipal (Svilajnac) ===
2004 Svilajnac municipal election: Mayor of Svilajnac
Candidate	Party	Votes	%
Dobrivoje Budimirović	Citizens' Group: For a Rich Municipality of Svilajnac	7,127	55.85
Milija Jovanović (incumbent)	Democratic Party	1,624	12.73
Gorica Gajić	Democratic Party of Serbia	1,579	12.37
Mića Nešić	G17 Plus	852	6.68
Branislav Marinković	Serbian Renewal Movement–Citizen's Group: PP	794	6.22
Radovan Radosavljević	Strength of Serbia Movement	440	3.45
Staniša Strainović	Socialist Party of Serbia	232	1.82
Ljubiša Radosavljević	People's Democratic Party–Democratic Movement of Romanians of Serbia	114	0.89
Total		12,762	100.00

Svilajnac mayoral recall election, 2 September 2007
Choice	Votes	%
No on recall	5,940	51.17
Yes on recall	5,668	48.83
Total valid votes	11,608	100

=== National Assembly of Serbia ===
1990 Serbian parliamentary election: Svilajnac
Candidate	Party
Dobrivoje Budimirović Bidža (***WINNER***)	Socialist Party of Serbia
Vitomir Vasić	Liberal Party (Liberalna stranka)
Nenad Govedarović	Democratic Party
Zoran Lalković	Serbian Renewal Movement
Radoslav Milosavljević	Citizens' Group
Radiša Nedeljković	Party of the Union of Serbian Peasants
Obradin Čolić	Citizens' Group
Total
