= Ljubinko Đurković =

Serbian military officer and politician (1962)

- Љубинко Ђурковић
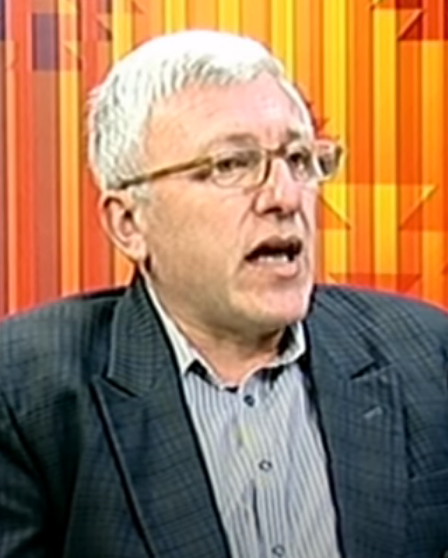
- Đurković in 2018

Member of the National Assembly of the Republic of Serbia
- Incumbent
- Assumed office 24 July 2024
- In office 18 October 2022 – 6 February 2024

Personal details
- Born: 1962 (age 63–64) Raška, PR Serbia, FPR Yugoslavia
- Party: Non-Party, aligned with POKS (2020–present); Movement for Serbia (previously)

Military service
- Allegiance: SFR Yugoslavia; FR Yugoslavia; Serbia
- Branch/service: Yugoslav People's Army; Armed Forces of FR Yugoslavia; Serbian Army
- Years of service: 1986–2011
- Rank: Colonel (VS)
- Unit: Second Battalion of the 125th Motorized Brigade
- Battles/wars: Croatian War of Independence; Kosovo War; Battle of Košare

Ljubinko Đurković (Serbian Cyrillic: Љубинко Ђурковић; born 1962) is a Serbian politician and retired colonel. He is best known for having led forces of the Yugoslav Army in the Battle of Košare during the 1999 Kosovo War. He is currently serving his second term in the Serbian national assembly.

He is a vice-president of the Movement for the Restoration of the Kingdom of Serbia (POKS), although he is not formally a member of the party.

== Early life and military career ==
Đurković was born in Raška, in what was then the People's Republic of Serbia in the Federal People's Republic of Yugoslavia. He graduated from the Military Academy and General Staff School in Belgrade and was assigned to what was then the Socialist Autonomous Province of Kosovo in 1985, with his home garrison situated in Peć. During the Croatian War of the 1990s, he fought with the forces of the Republika Srpska Krajina in Pakrac.

In the Battle of Košare, the Yugoslavian Army fought against insurgents from the Kosovo Liberation Army (KLA), who were aided by the North Atlantic Treaty Organization (NATO) and the Albanian Army. In two months of intense fighting, the Yugoslavian forces prevented the KLA from securing a corridor from Albania into Kosovo. Đurković served as commander of the Second Battalion of the 125th Motorized Brigade. In a 2018 interview, he described the KLA attack as part of a larger campaign of NATO aggression and praised his soldiers for what he described as their bravery in defending their homeland and its cultural heritage under extremely difficult conditions. He also described the battle as having been a "forbidden topic" in the years immediately after the war and expressed gratitude that its military importance was belatedly recognized. In another interview, he praised non-Serb officers in the Yugoslav Army for their service at Košare, giving particular citation to Captain Krunoslav Ivanković, an ethnic Croat who died in the battle.

He retired from the Serbian Armed Forces (a successor to the Yugoslavian army) in 2011 with the rank of colonel. He now lives in the village of Pocesje in Raška.

== Politician ==
Đurković has served as vice-president of a small political party called the Movement for Serbia (Pokret za Srbiju).

He appeared on a combined electoral list of the Democratic Party of Serbia (DSS) and Dveri in the 2016 Serbian parliamentary election as a non-party candidate. During the campaign, he said that he would fight for the interests of veterans and those invalided by war and seek the annulment of all agreements with NATO that harm Serbia's interests. The DSS–Dveri alliance was on the right wing of the political spectrum; this notwithstanding, DSS leader Sanda Rašković Ivić described Đurković as a "committed leftist" who had chosen to align himself with their campaign. He appeared in the twenty-fifth position on their combined list and was not elected when it won thirteen mandates.

In 2018, Đurković attended a conference entitled "Spiritual and Moral Security of Man in the Modern World" (Духовно-морална безбедност човека у савременом свету) in Luhansk, in the secessionist Luhansk People's Republic in Ukraine. He argued that the spiritual values of the Donbas people would lead them to victory over what he described as the materialist values of the west. He also criticized not only NATO but also the peacekeeping forces of the United Nations for their actions in the Yugoslav Wars of the 1990s.

Đurković received the first position on the POKS's For the Kingdom of Serbia list in the 2020 Serbian parliamentary election. Once again, he contested the election as a non-party figure. In accepting the nomination, he said that he would fight for Serbia to provide support for veterans of the Yugoslav Wars of the 1990s. He was later part of a For the Kingdom Serbia delegation that laid a wreath at the monument of Draža Mihailović at Ravna Gora; in so doing, he argued for Mihailović's credentials as an anti-fascist leader. The POKS list narrowly missed the threshold to win assembly representation.

In December 2021, the POKS became divided into rival groups led by party founder Žika Gojković and former Belgrade mayor Vojislav Mihailović. Đurković sided with Mihailović's group, which contested the 2022 Serbian parliamentary election with the DSS in the National Democratic Alternative (NADA) alliance. Due to an ongoing dispute over the party name, Mihailović's group could not be identified as the POKS; it instead used the name "For the Kingdom of Serbia (Monarchists)." Đurković received the seventeenth position on the alliance's list and narrowly missed election when it won fifteen mandates. Soon after the vote, Mihailović was recognized by Serbia's government as the legitimate leader of the POKS.

Đurković received an assembly mandate on 18 October 2022 as the replacement for another delegate. He served afterward as a member of the committee on constitutional and legislative issues and the committee on education, science, technological development, and the information society; he was also the leader of Serbia's parliamentary friendship group with India. The Serbian Progressive Party (SNS) and its allies won the 2022 election, and the POKS served in opposition.

He was given the eighteenth position on the NADA coalition's list in the 2023 Serbian parliamentary election and was not immediately re-elected when the list won thirteen seats. His first term ended when the new assembly convened in February 2024.

He returned to parliament on 24 July 2024, once again as the replacement for another POKS delegate.
