= Nemanja Šarović =

Serbian politician and journalist (born 1974)

- Немања Шаровић
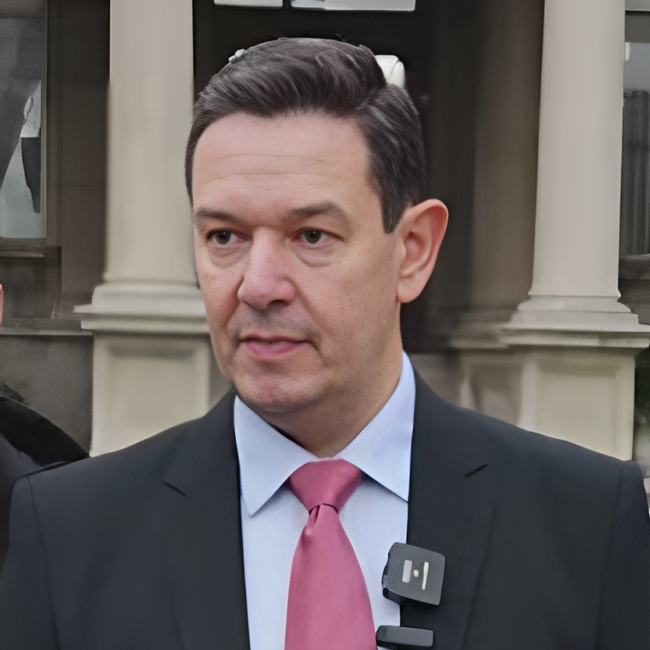
- Šarović in 2023

President of Love, Faith, Hope
- Incumbent
- Assumed office 21 September 2020
- Preceded by: Position established

Member of the National Assembly
- In office 3 June 2016 – 3 August 2020
- In office 28 December 2009 – 31 May 2012
- In office 12 February 2004 – 11 June 2008

Member of the City Assembly of Belgrade
- In office 16 September 2008 – 12 June 2012

Personal details
- Born: 28 December 1974 (age 51) Belgrade, SR Serbia, SFR Yugoslavia
- Party: LJVN (2020–present)
- Other political affiliations: SRS (1997–2020)
- Spouses: Aleksandra Ilić (m. 2011; div. 2013) Katarina Odalović (m. 2017; div. 2021)
- Children: 3
- Education: University of Belgrade
- Occupation: Politician; journalist

Nemanja Šarović (Serbian: Немања Шаровић; born 28 December 1974) is a Serbian politician and journalist. A long-time member of the far-right Serbian Radical Party (SRS) and a close associate of its leader Vojislav Šešelj, he served four terms in the National Assembly between 2004 and 2020. He left the SRS in 2020 and founded the right-wing political movement Love, Faith, Hope (LJVN), which he has led since. Since 2023, he has worked as a journalist for the opposition broadcaster KTV Television, where he became known for his satirical coverage of rallies of the ruling Serbian Progressive Party (SNS). Ahead of the 2026 Serbian parliamentary election, his movement endorsed the Student List.

== Early life and career ==
Šarović was born in Belgrade. He graduated from the University of Belgrade Faculty of Law, completed a legal apprenticeship, and worked for two and a half years at Belgrade's First Municipal Court before entering politics.

== Political career ==
=== Early years (2000–2004) ===
Šarović led the SRS list for the Belgrade division of Palilula in the 2000 Yugoslav parliamentary election, and was not elected when the party won no seats in the division. He also ran for the City Assembly of Belgrade and the Stari Grad municipal assembly in the concurrent 2000 Serbian local elections, and was defeated at both levels. (Note: This was the last local election cycle in Serbia in which delegates were elected in single-member constituencies. All subsequent cycles have used proportional representation.)

These votes were overshadowed by the presidential election, in which Slobodan Milošević of the Socialist Party of Serbia (SPS) fell from power after losing to Vojislav Koštunica of the Democratic Opposition of Serbia (DOS). A new Serbian parliamentary election followed in December 2000, under a reformed system in which the whole country formed a single constituency and parties assigned mandates to candidates on their lists at their own discretion, regardless of list order. Šarović was 81st on the SRS list and was not assigned a mandate after the list won 23 seats. During this period, he led the SRS municipal board in Stari Grad.

=== First and second assembly terms (2004–2008) ===
Šarović was 85th on the SRS list in the 2003 Serbian parliamentary election, in which the party won 82 seats. He was not initially included in the party's delegation, but received a mandate on 12 February 2004 as a replacement for a member who had resigned. The Radicals were the largest party in the assembly but served in opposition. During this term, Šarović sat on the legislative committee and the committee on justice and administration. He also led the SRS list in Stari Grad in the 2004 Serbian local elections and was elected when the list won nine of 56 seats; the Democratic Party (DS) won the election, and the Radicals were in opposition at this level too.

In 2005, it was reported that Šarović had claimed 1,639,088 dinars in travel expenses between Belgrade and Vranje, where he worked as an SRS organiser. In a 2006 interview with the Mexican newspaper Reforma, he said that the Radicals did not oppose Serbia joining the European Union in principle, but would not accept the price of giving up sovereignty over Kosovo. He also said he had been arrested three times since the fall of Milošević.

Šarović was 21st on the SRS list in the 2007 parliamentary election and was elected when the list won 81 seats. The Radicals again finished first but remained in opposition. During his second term, he sat on the committees on foreign affairs, economic reforms and administration.

=== Third assembly term (2008–2012) ===
Šarović was tenth on the SRS list in the 2008 parliamentary election, in which the party won 78 seats, and also ran in the concurrent local elections in Belgrade and Stari Grad. After inconclusive results, the Radicals negotiated with the Democratic Party of Serbia (DSS) and the SPS to form governments at the republic and city levels. Šarović was an SRS negotiator in Belgrade, and was rumoured to be in line for the post of city manager. The Socialists instead formed coalitions with the DS-led For a European Serbia alliance at both levels, and Šarović did not initially take up a mandate. In July 2008, he led a protest march in Belgrade's Voždovac municipality against the arrest of former Bosnian Serb leader Radovan Karadžić.

When the SRS split in late 2008 and several members founded the more moderate Serbian Progressive Party under Tomislav Nikolić and Aleksandar Vučić, Šarović stayed with the Radicals and became a vocal critic of the new party. On 16 September 2008, he took a seat in the Belgrade city assembly and replaced Vučić as leader of the SRS group there. He also ran to succeed Vučić as party secretary-general, but lost to Elena Božić Talijan. He returned to the National Assembly on 28 December 2009, replacing Božić Talijan after her resignation. In this term, he sat on the committee for Kosovo and Metohija and was a member of Serbia's delegation to the Inter-Parliamentary Union assembly.

After the arrest of former Bosnian Serb military commander Ratko Mladić in 2011, Šarović described the victims of the Srebrenica massacre as "casualties of war" and said he believed Mladić was innocent of war crimes, stating: "Those who died in Srebrenica were only those who did not lower their weapons and continued to fight. War is war and these things happen." He also served as an adviser to Šešelj, who was then on trial at the International Criminal Tribunal for the former Yugoslavia (ICTY) in The Hague. On one occasion, the tribunal barred Šešelj from meeting Šarović, on the grounds that he was using such meetings to send out political directives.

=== Out of parliament (2012–2016) ===
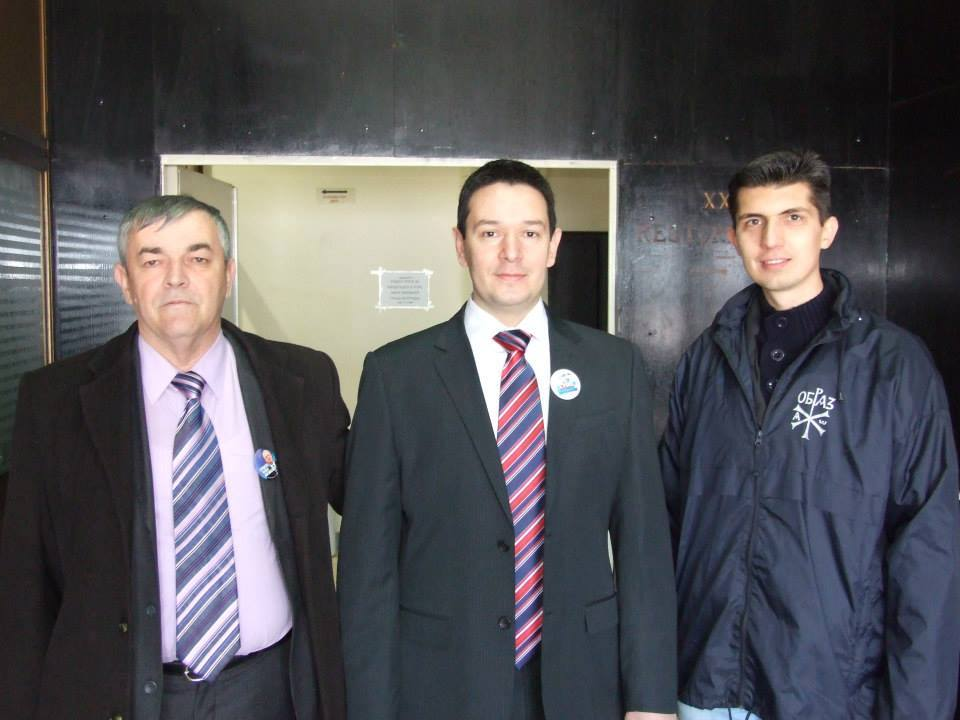
Šarović (centre) with General Božidar Delić (left) and Obraz leader Mladen Obradović (right) in 2014

From 2012, parliamentary mandates were awarded to candidates strictly in list order. Šarović was fourth on the SRS list in the 2012 parliamentary election and second in the 2014 election. He also led the SRS lists in Belgrade and Stari Grad in the 2012 Serbian local elections, and was second on the party's list in the 2014 Belgrade City Assembly election. In both Belgrade elections, he was the party's candidate for mayor. (Note: Serbian mayors are not directly elected; Šarović was the SRS's presumptive nominee for mayor had the party won.) The SRS fell below the electoral threshold in all of these elections.

In 2013, Šarović led protests against the negotiations on the Brussels Agreement between Belgrade and Pristina, at one point accusing President Nikolić of treason. After the agreement was concluded, then Deputy Prime Minister Vučić said that Šarović had sent him threatening text messages from his personal phone. When the ICTY allowed Šešelj to return to Serbia for medical treatment in 2014, Šarović said that Šešelj would not return to The Hague voluntarily.

=== Fourth assembly term and departure from the SRS (2016–2020) ===
The Radicals returned to parliament with 22 seats in the 2016 parliamentary election, and Šarović, again second on the list, was elected to a fourth term. He and Nataša Jovanović represented the SRS in consultations with President Nikolić on forming a government, a meeting that reportedly ended after 30 seconds when the Radicals demanded Nikolić's resignation. Later in 2016, Šarović was convicted of burning a flag of the United States and given a suspended sentence. When Šešelj was convicted in absentia by the ICTY in 2018 and some MPs called for his expulsion from the assembly, Šarović argued that there was no legal basis for it.

During the 2016–2020 parliament, Šarović was a member of the administrative committee (Note: Formally the Committee on Administrative, Budgetary, Mandate and Immunity Issues.) and the health and family committee; a deputy member of the committees on constitutional and legislative issues, on the diaspora and Serbs in the region, and on Kosovo and Metohija; a deputy member of Serbia's delegation to the NATO Parliamentary Assembly, where Serbia has observer status; and a member of the parliamentary friendship groups with China, Greece, Russia and Venezuela.

Šarović was seventh on the SRS list in the 2020 Serbian parliamentary election, in which the party again fell below the threshold. He left the party on 16 July 2020, citing fundamental disagreements with Šešelj over its direction and the wider political situation. He later accused Šešelj of being insufficiently critical of the SNS-led government, and rejected suggestions that he would join the Progressives.

=== Love, Faith, Hope ===
In September 2020, Šarović and General Božidar Delić, another former Radical, launched the political movement Love, Faith, Hope (LJVN). Šarović said the name reflected "universal Christian virtues" from which society had moved away, that the movement wanted "a state where the law applies to everyone", and that he regarded Aleksandar Vučić as its main political opponent. Delić left in January 2022 to form the movement There's no Going Back – Serbia Is Behind.

The movement did not contest the 2022 parliamentary election, but ran the list "Nemanja Šarović – For the Whole Normal World" in the concurrent 2022 Belgrade City Assembly election, with Šarović as its mayoral candidate. He said he was running alone to avoid the "political mud and political trade" of electoral coalitions. The list fell below the threshold. In November 2023, Šarović withdrew from the 2023 Belgrade City Assembly election, citing bureaucratic obstruction by the SNS. The movement also stayed out of the 2024 Belgrade City Assembly election, and Šarović called on smaller opposition groups to withdraw as well, to avoid vote splitting that would benefit the SNS. Ahead of the 2026 Serbian parliamentary election, LJVN decided not to run and endorsed the Student List.

=== IRMCT summons ===
In May 2022, Šarović was among seven current and former SRS officials named in a summons issued to Šešelj by the International Residual Mechanism for Criminal Tribunals (IRMCT), the successor to the ICTY, over the publication of classified information and the names of protected witnesses. Šarović said he recognised only the laws of Serbia and would not respond. He was not included in the indictment issued on 11 August 2023.

== Journalism ==
Since 2023, Šarović has reported for the opposition broadcaster KTV Television of Zrenjanin, which he has called "the only free television in Serbia". He became known for his satirical coverage of SNS rallies and his interviews with their participants.

While covering the 2024–present Serbian anti-corruption protests, Šarović was detained twice by police. On 8 March 2025, he was detained for "disturbing public order and peace" while reporting on a pro-SNS counter-protest in Pionirski Park, and was released the same day. He was detained again on 14 March. On 12 April 2025, he and a KTV crew were physically attacked while covering an SNS rally outside the National Assembly.

== Political positions ==
Šarović is a right-wing politician. He opposes the recognition of Kosovo and has claimed that Vučić "did more for independent Kosovo than Hashim Thaçi and Albin Kurti". He opposes Serbia's accession to the European Union, saying it would be "much better for the citizens of Serbia and for the country to turn away from the European Union and start taking care of our own interests". He also opposes NATO, and in 2013 took part in burning NATO, EU, US and Kosovo flags in Belgrade. In 2021, he argued that the Taliban's return to power in Afghanistan showed it was "disastrous" for countries to align with the United States, contrasting this with Russia's backing of Bashar al-Assad in Syria.

== Personal life ==
Šarović married Aleksandra Ilić of New Serbia in 2011, and they have a son. They divorced in 2013, partly because of political differences. He married Katarina Odalović in 2017, with whom he has two children.

== Electoral history ==
Sources for the list positions and results below are given in the relevant sections above.

Year	Election	List	Position	Result
2000	Federal Assembly (Chamber of Citizens), Palilula division	SRS	1	Not elected
2000	Belgrade City Assembly, Stari Grad division 2	SRS	—	Not elected
2000	Stari Grad Municipal Assembly, division 10	SRS	—	Not elected
2000	National Assembly	SRS	81	Not assigned a mandate
2003	National Assembly	SRS	85	Mandate from 12 February 2004 (Note: As a replacement for a member who had resigned.)
2004	Stari Grad Municipal Assembly	SRS	1	Elected
2007	National Assembly	SRS	21	Elected
2008	National Assembly	SRS	10	Mandate from 28 December 2009
2008	Belgrade City Assembly	SRS	3	Mandate from 16 September 2008
2008	Stari Grad Municipal Assembly	SRS	1	Did not take up mandate
2012	National Assembly	SRS	4	List below threshold
2012	Belgrade City Assembly (Note: Also the SRS's candidate for mayor.)	SRS	1	List below threshold
2012	Stari Grad Municipal Assembly	SRS	1	List below threshold
2014	National Assembly	SRS	2	List below threshold
2014	Belgrade City Assembly	SRS	2	List below threshold
2016	National Assembly	SRS	2	Elected
2020	National Assembly	SRS	7	List below threshold
2022	Belgrade City Assembly (Note: Also the list's candidate for mayor.)	Love, Faith, Hope: "Nemanja Šarović – For the Whole Normal World"	1	List below threshold
