= National Democratic Alternative =

National Democratic Alternative may refer to:

- National Democratic Alternative (Portugal)
- National Democratic Alternative (Serbia)
