= Bunjevci Citizens of Serbia =

Serbian political party

Bunjevci Citizens of Serbia (Serbian: Буњевци Грађани Србије, Bunjevci građani Srbije; abbr. BGS), formerly known as the Bunjevac Party of Vojvodina (Bunjevačka stranka Vojvodine, BSV), is a political party in Serbia representing the Bunjevac ethnic minority. The party joined the National Democratic Alternative (NADA) alliance in 2022. As of 2022, the party's representative is Bojana Jelić.

Božidar Delić was elected to the National Assembly of Serbia in the 2022 parliamentary election as a BGS candidate, although he was not a member of the party.

== History ==
=== Bunjevac Party of Vojvodina ===
The Bunjevac Party of Vojvodina was formed in Subotica in February 2008, with the goals of promoting the autonomy of Bunjevci in Serbia and recognition of the Bunjevac language. Branko Francišković was chosen as the party's first president; representatives of the Democratic Party (DS), G17 Plus, and other parties were in attendance at its founding convention. The party was initially a rival of Mirko Bajić's Alliance of Bačka Bunjevci (SBB), whose recruitment tactics Francišković criticized in 2010. The BSV won a single seat in the Subotica city assembly in the 2008 Serbian local elections.

The BSV joined the United Regions of Serbia (URS) coalition for the 2012 local elections. The coalition's list fell below the threshold for representation in the Subotica assembly; in the aftermath of the campaign, the party announced changes to its leadership. Vojislav Orčić became the BSV's new president, and in the 2014 Serbian parliamentary election he announced its support for the Serbian Progressive Party (SNS).

=== Bunjevci Citizens of Serbia ===
Renamed as Bunjevci Citizens of Serbia, the party formed an electoral alliance with Srđan Šajn's Roma Party called "Citizens of Serbia" in 2016. This alliance later expanded into a broader coalition of parties, mostly representing Serbia's national minority communities. BGS's leader at the time was Stevan Rainović. The "Citizens of Serbia" coalition intended to field its own electoral list in the 2016 Serbian parliamentary election but ultimately did not do so.

BGS participated in the 2018 elections for Serbia's Bunjevac National Council as part of a coalition of all major Bunjevac parties. In the 2020 Serbian local elections, BGS formed an electoral alliance in Subotica with its former rival, Bajić's SBB. The alliance won two seats in the city's parliament.

==== 2022 parliamentary election ====
BGS participated in the 2022 Serbian parliamentary election as part of the NADA alliance. Božidar Delić, the leader of the There's no Going Back – Serbia Is Behind political movement, appeared in the lead position on the alliance's electoral list; formally, his endorsement was from BGS. The only other BGS-endorsed candidate on the list was Aleksandar Jerković, the vice-president of Delić's movement, who appeared in the twenty-third position. Neither was actually a member of Bunjevci Citizens of Serbia.

The list won fifteen seats, and Delić was elected. He died on 23 August 2022, and Jerković later entered the assembly as his replacement.
