= Milija Jovanović =

Serbian Politician and Mayor (1953)

Milija Jovanović (Serbian Cyrillic: Милија Јовановић; born 8 November 1953) is a politician in Serbia. He was the mayor of Svilajnac from 2000 to 2004 and served in the National Assembly of Serbia from 2001 to 2004. Originally a member of the Democratic Party (Demokratska stranka, DS), he joined the breakaway Liberal Democratic Party (Liberalno demokratska partija, LDP) on its formation in 2005.

== Private career ==
Jovanović is a graduated economist.

== Politician ==
=== Democratic Party ===
Jovanović appeared in the sixteenth position (out of twenty-two) on the DS's electoral list for the Smederevo division in the 1992 Serbian parliamentary election. The list did not cross the electoral threshold to win any seats in the division. He was promoted to the second position in the 1993 Serbian parliamentary election; he list won three seats, but despite being in an advantageous position he was not chosen for a mandate. (From 1992 to 2000, Serbia's electoral law stipulated that one-third of parliamentary mandates would be assigned to candidates on successful lists in numerical order, while the remaining two-thirds would be distributed amongst other candidates at the discretion of sponsoring parties or coalitions. Jovanović was not automatically elected and was not given an optional mandate.)

In 2000, the DS participated in the Democratic Opposition of Serbia (Demokratska opozicija Srbije, DOS), a broad and ideologically diverse coalition of parties opposed to Slobodan Milošević's administration. DOS candidate Vojislav Koštunica defeated Milošević in the 2000 Yugoslavian presidential election, a watershed moment in Serbian and Yugoslavian politics. The DOS also won a narrow victory in Svilajnac in the concurrent 2000 Serbian local elections, and Jovanović was afterward chosen as mayor. He held a much lower profile in this role than his larger-than-life predecessor, Dobrivoje Budimirović.

The fall of Milošević led to a new Serbian parliamentary election in December 2000. Serbia's electoral laws were reformed prior to the vote, such that the entire country was counted as a single electoral division and all mandates were awarded to candidates on successful lists at the discretion of the sponsoring parties or coalitions, irrespective of numerical order. Jovanović was given the 186th position on the DOS list and was chosen for a mandate when the list won a landslide majority with 176 out of 250 seats. In parliament, he served on the committee for finance and the committee for petitions and proposals.

DS leader Zoran Đinđić was assassinated in 2003. Afterward, Jovanović oversaw the renaming of one of Svilajnac's main streets after Đinđić.

The DOS had dissolved by the time of the 2003 Serbian parliamentary election. Jovanović received the 163rd position on the DS's list; the list won thirty-seven seats, and he was not chosen for a new mandate.

Serbia briefly introduced the direct election of mayors for the 2004 Serbian local elections. Jovanović sought re-election in Svilajnac and was resoundingly defeated by Budimirović. After reclaiming office, Budimirović reversed the decision to rename a street after Đinđić.

=== Liberal Democratic Party ===
The DS experienced a significant split in 2005, and Jovanović joined the breakaway Liberal Democratic Party. Jovanović appeared on the LDP's electoral lists in the 2007 and 2008 parliamentary elections but was not given a mandate on either occasion. The LDP did not cross the electoral threshold in Svilajnac in the 2008 local elections.

Serbia's electoral laws were reformed again in 2011, such that all mandates were awarded to candidates on successful lists in numerical order. The LDP contested the 2012 parliamentary election in the U-Turn (Serbian: Preokret) coalition. Jovanović was given the 115th position on the coalition's list and was not elected when the list won only nineteen seats. He also led the coalition's list in Svilajnac in the concurrent 2012 local elections; the list did not cross the threshold. He has not sought a return to political life since this time.

== Electoral record ==
=== Municipal (Svilajnac) ===
2004 Svilajnac municipal election: Mayor of Svilajnac
Candidate	Party	Votes	%
Dobrivoje Budimirović	Citizens' Group: For a Rich Municipality of Svilajnac	7,127	55.85
Milija Jovanović (incumbent)	Democratic Party	1,624	12.73
Gorica Gajić	Democratic Party of Serbia	1,579	12.37
Mića Nešić	G17 Plus	852	6.68
Branislav Marinković	Serbian Renewal Movement–Citizen's Group: PP	794	6.22
Radovan Radosavljević	Strength of Serbia Movement	440	3.45
Staniša Strainović	Socialist Party of Serbia	232	1.82
Ljubiša Radosavljević	People's Democratic Party–Democratic Movement of Romanians of Serbia	114	0.89
Total		12,762	100.00
