= KTV Television =

Television station in Zrenjanin, Serbia

KTV Television (Serbian Cyrillic: КТВ телевизија, romanized: KTV Televizija), also known as KTV Zrenjanin, is a privately owned Serbian television station based in the city of Zrenjanin in the province of Vojvodina.

== History ==
KTV Television was founded by the husband and wife team of Saša and Danica Radić in 1993. During the rule of Slobodan Milošević's administration in the 1990s, the station was known for providing a forum for both government and opposition voices and for expanding beyond merely local programming.

Beginning in 2016, the Serbian government made efforts to buy and take over the station. These were ultimately unsuccessful. After Danica Radić's death in November 2021, ownership of the station passed to her son, Danijel Radić.

The station has often had a fraught relationship with Serbian president Aleksandar Vučić and the country's administration led by the Serbian Progressive Party (SNS). In July 2024, Serbia's minister of information and telecommunications Dejan Ristić accused a KTV journalist of calling for "the public lynching of the son of the Serbian president." The station responded that Ristić's statement was "shameful" and a "complete falsehood," and that it represented an attack on Serbia's independent media. Ristić's ministry later initiated proceedings against KTV, a move that was criticized as overstepping its powers and infringing on the work of the Regulatory Body for Electronic Media (REM).

One of KTV Television's most prominent journalists as of 2025 is Nemanja Šarović, a former Serbian Radical Party (SRS) parliamentarian who is now the leader of the Love, Faith, Hope (LJVN) political movement. Šarović, a longtime opponent of Vučić and the SNS government, has received attention for his coverage of Serbia's ongoing anti-corruption protests.
