= Milan Lapčević =

Serbian politician

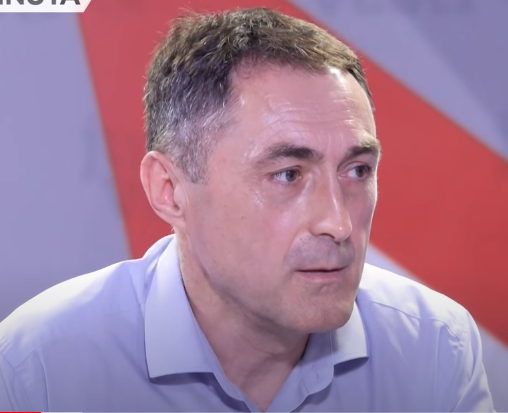
Milan Lapčević in 2018

Milan Lapčević (Serbian Cyrillic: Милан Лапчевић; born 8 October 1969) is a politician in Serbia. He has served three terms in the National Assembly of Serbia, most recently from 2016 to 2020. Formerly a member of the Democratic Party of Serbia (Demokratska stranka Srbije, DSS), Lapčević has been an independent politician since 2018.

== Private life ==
Lapčević is a graduated mechanical engineer living in Niš. In 2015–16, he led a hiking expedition through Albania and Greece to commemorate the centenary of the Serbian army's retreat through Albania during World War I.

== Politician ==
=== Municipal and regional politics ===
Lapčević served on the executive board of Niš's city government from 2000 to 2004 and was the administrator for Serbia's Nišava District from 2004 to 2008. In May 2004, he introduced an anti-corruption program focused on border crossings between Serbia and Bulgaria. He ran for mayor of Palilula, Niš in the 2004 Serbian local elections and finished third.

He returned to the Niš city assembly following the 2008 Serbian local elections and led the DSS group in the assembly. He subsequently appeared in the lead position on the party's electoral list in the 2012 local elections and was re-elected when the list won four mandates. He did not seek re-election at the local level in 2016.

=== Parliamentarian ===
Lapčević received the 133rd position on the DSS's list in the 2003 Serbian parliamentary election. The party won fifty-three seats, and he was not included in its assembly delegation. (From 2000 to 2011, Serbian parliamentary mandates were awarded to sponsoring parties or coalitions rather than to individual candidates, and it was common practice for mandates to be assigned out of numerical order. Lapčević could have been chosen to serve in the assembly despite his relatively low position, but he was not.) He received the 118th position on a combined DSS–New Serbia list for the 2007 parliamentary election and was once again not selected for an assembly mandate.

He was promoted to the forty-first position on the DSS–New Serbia list for the 2008 parliamentary election and, this time, was chosen to serve in his party's delegation after the list won thirty seats. The DSS, which had been in government before the election, moved into opposition when a new coalition government was formed under the rival Democratic Party (Demokratska stranka).

Serbia's electoral system was reformed in 2011, such that parliamentary mandates were assigned in numerical order to candidates on successful lists. Lapčević received the nineteenth position on the DSS's list in the 2012 election and was re-elected when the list won twenty-one mandates. The Serbian Progressive Party and the Socialist Party of Serbia formed a new coalition government after the election, and the DSS remained in opposition. Lapčević received the sixteenth position on the DSS's list in the 2014 election, in which the party did not cross the electoral threshold to win representation in the assembly.

Lapčević became a vice-president of the DSS in 2015. He took part in a delegation of DSS and Dveri members to the Republic of Crimea in October of the same year, following the disputed area's de facto joining of the Russian Federation.

The DSS contested the 2016 Serbian parliamentary election on a combined list with Dveri. Lapčević received the tenth position on the list and was elected for a third term when the list won thirteen mandates. The DSS continued to serve in opposition.

The DSS experienced a serious split in November 2016, after which Lapčević, Gorica Gajić, and Dejan Šulkić were the only assembly members to remain with the party. As four members are needed to form a parliamentary group, they served in the assembly as independents. Lapčević left the DSS on 11 April 2018. In June 2020, he said that he had tried to create an informal group of parliamentarians from southern Serbia, without success.

During the 2016–20 parliament, Lapčević was deputy chair of the parliamentary committee on finance, state budget, and control of public spending; a deputy member of the culture and information committee and the committee on constitutional and legislative issues; a member of the subcommittee for the consideration of reports on audits conducted by the state audit institution; a deputy member of Serbia's delegation to the Parliamentary Assembly of the Organization for Security and Co-operation in Europe (OSCE PA); and a member of the parliamentary friendship groups with Australia, Azerbaijan, Belarus, Bosnia and Herzegovina, China, Georgia, Greece, Iran, Italy, Kazakhstan, North Macedonia, Montenegro, Romania, Russia, Slovenia, and Switzerland. He was not a candidate for re-election in 2020.

== Electoral record ==
=== Local (City of Niš) ===
2004 City of Niš local election: Mayor of Palilula
| Candidate | Party | First round | | Second round | |
| Candidate | Party | Votes | % | Votes | % |
|---|---|---|---|---|---|
| Miroslav Đorđević | Serbian Renewal Movement (endorsed by Democratic Party–Boris Tadić) | 3,390 | 26.00 | 7,438 | 51.30 |
| Milosav Lukić | Serbian Radical Party–Tomislav Nikolić | 2,250 | 17.26 | 7,060 | 48.70 |
| Milan Lapčević | Democratic Party of Serbia–Vojislav Koštunica | 1,583 | 12.14 | | |
| Milica Marković | information missing | 1,538 | 11.80 | | |
| Aleksandar Milićević | G17 Plus | 1,353 | 10.38 | | |
| Miloš Stojković | information missing | 858 | 6.58 | | |
| Velibor Petrović | Political Organization for Democratic Change "New Serbia"–Velimir Ilić | 801 | 6.14 | | |
| Miodrag Stanković | Citizens' Group: Coalition for Niš–Miodrag Stanković | 695 | 5.33 | | |
| Miodrag Mitić | Strength of Serbia Movement–Bogoljub Karić | 334 | 2.56 | | |
| Miodrag Mladenović | Democratic Alternative–Social Democratic Party–Dr. Nebojša Čović | 234 | 1.80 | | |
| Total | | 13,036 | 100.00 | 14,498 | 100.00 |
