= Aleksandra Ilić =

Serbian politician

Aleksandra Ilić (Serbian Cyrillic: Александра Илић; born 30 March 1981), formerly known as Aleksandra Šarović (Serbian Cyrillic: Александра Шаровић), is a politician in Serbia. She served in the National Assembly of Serbia from 2008 to 2012 as a member of New Serbia (Nova Srbija, NS).

== Early life and career ==
Ilić was born in Užice, in what was then the Socialist Republic of Serbia in the Socialist Federal Republic of Yugoslavia. She graduated from Belgrade's Music Academy in the department of instrumental piano and taught at the Josip Marinković Music School in Belgrade before entering political life.

== Politician ==
New Serbia contested the 2008 Serbian parliamentary election in an alliance with the Democratic Party of Serbia (Demokratska stranka Srbije, DSS), and Ilić received the 155th position on the combined electoral list of the parties. The list won thirty mandates, nine of which were assigned to New Serbia, and she was included in her party's delegation when the new assembly convened. (From 2000 to 2011, Serbian parliamentary mandates were awarded to sponsoring parties or coalitions rather than to individual candidates, and it was common practice for mandates to be awarded out of numerical order. Ilić's specific position on the list had no formal bearing on her chances of election.) The results of the election were inconclusive, but the For a European Serbia alliance eventually formed a coalition government with the Socialist Party of Serbia (Socijalistička partija Srbije, SPS), and New Serbia served in opposition. Ilić was a member of the parliamentary friendship groups with Greece, Italy, and the Sovereign Order of Malta.

She was given the sixth position on a combined DSS–NS list for the Voždovac municipal assembly in a special off-year election held in December 2009. The list won six seats, and Ilić did not take a seat in the assembly.

New Serbia subsequently ended its alliance with the DSS and became part of the coalition around the Serbian Progressive Party (Srpska napredna stranka, SNS). In an unrelated development, Serbia reformed its electoral laws in 2011 such that mandates were awarded to candidates on successful lists in numerical order. Ilić did not seek re-election at the republic level in 2012, but she was given the twelfth position on the SNS's list for the Voždovac municipal assembly in the 2013 local elections. The list won a majority victory with thirty-six out of fifty-five mandates; Ilić was elected and served for the next three years. She was not a candidate for re-election in 2016.

Ilić married Nemanja Šarović of the far-right Serbian Radical Party (Srpska radikalna stranka, SRS) in 2011. They divorced in 2013, in part due to political differences. Ilić was known as Aleksandra Šarović during the time that they were married.
