= Mirko Čikiriz =

Serbian politician

- Мирко Чикириз

Assistant Mayor of Kragujevac
- In office 5 November 2020 – 10 October 2023

State Secretary in the Serbian Ministry of Justice
- In office 2017–2020

Member of the National Assembly of the Republic of Serbia
- In office 11 June 2008 – 3 June 2016

Personal details
- Born: 21 January 1963 (age 63) Guča, Lučani, PR Serbia, FPR Yugoslavia
- Party: SPO (1990–2017); POKS (2017–2022); Kragujevac the Capital–Serbia the Kingdom (2023–present)
- Occupation: Politician

Mirko Čikiriz (Serbian Cyrillic: Мирко Чикириз; born 21 January 1963) is a Serbian politician. He has served three terms in the National Assembly of Serbia, been a state secretary in the Serbian government, and been an assistant mayor of Kragujevac.

At one time a prominent member of the Serbian Renewal Movement (SPO), Čikiriz joined the breakaway Movement for the Restoration of the Kingdom of Serbia (POKS) in 2017. That organization split in late 2021, and he became a prominent figure in a party faction led by Žika Gojković. Gojković's POKS group ceased to exist in 2022, and the following year Čikiriz launched a local political movement called Kragujevac the Capital–Serbia the Kingdom.

== Early life and career ==
Čikiriz was born in the small town of Guča, Lučani, in what was then the People's Republic of Serbia in the People's Federal Republic of Yugoslavia. He graduated from the University of Kragujevac Faculty of Law in 1988, passed the bar exam in 1995, and afterward worked at law in Kragujevac. From 1998 to 2008, he was the legal representative and head of the legal service for Takovo osiguranje in the city.

== Politician ==
=== Serbian Renewal Movement ===
Čikiriz's family has a long history of involvement in Serbian royalist politics. His ancestors were supporters of the Karađorđević dynasty in the nineteenth century, and for twenty days during World War II Draža Mihailović kept his military headquarters in the house of Čikiriz's grandmother. Several members of Čikiriz's family were shot by German forces during the Axis occupation of Serbia.

Čikiriz joined the SPO on its formation in 1990. He was arrested along with party leader Vuk Drašković following street protests against Slobodan Milošević's administration in June 1993; on his release, he organized further protests for the benefit of those party members still incarcerated. Čikiriz became a member of the SPO Kragujevac city board in 1996, and in 1997–98 he was secretary of the municipal assembly and municipal administration in nearby Lapovo. He later became president of the SPO's Kragujevac board and a member of its presidency for the Šumadija District.

He was a candidate in the Serbian parliamentary elections of 2000, 2003, and 2007, although he was not elected on any of these occasions. The SPO's electoral list did not cross the electoral threshold in 2000 or 2007. In 2003, the party ran in an alliance with New Serbia (NS) that won twenty-two seats. Čikiriz appeared in the 114th position on the combined list of the parties and was not given a mandate afterward. (From 2000 to 2011, assembly mandates were awarded to sponsoring parties or coalitions rather than to individual candidates, and it was common practice for the mandates to be assigned out of numerical order. Čikiriz could have been included in the SPO's delegation despite his low position on the list, but ultimately he was not.)

==== Parliamentarian ====
The SPO contested the 2008 Serbian parliamentary election as part of the For a European Serbia (ZES) alliance led by the Democratic Party (DS). Čikiriz was included on the alliance's (mostly alphabetical) list in the 242nd position and was given a mandate when ZES won a plurality victory with 102 seats out of 250. The overall results of the election were inconclusive, but ZES ultimately formed a coalition government with the Socialist Party of Serbia (SPS), and the SPO supported the administration. In his first assembly term, Čikiriz was a member of the legislative committee; a deputy member of the committee on youth and sports, the committee for relations with Serbs outside Serbia, and the poverty reduction committee; and a member of the parliamentary friendship groups with Australia, Belgium, Norway, and Portugal.

Čikiriz was also elected to the Kragujevac city assembly on the ZES alliance's list in the 2008 Serbian local elections. His term was brief; he resigned from the city assembly on 10 October 2008.

Serbia's electoral system was reformed in 2011, such that all mandates were awarded to candidates on successful lists in numerical order. The SPO contested the 2012 Serbian parliamentary election in an alliance with the Liberal Democratic Party (LDP) known as U-Turn (Preokret). Čikiriz received the seventeenth position on the alliance's list and was re-elected when it won nineteen seats. The Serbian Progressive Party (SNS) won the election and afterward formed a new coalition government with the SPS and other parties, and the SPO served in opposition. Čikiriz was a member of the committee on constitutional affairs and legislation and the committee on the rights of the child, a deputy member of the finance committee (Note: Formally known as the Committee on Finance, Budget, and Control of Public Spending.) and the administrative committee, (Note: Formally known as the Committee on Administrative, Budgetary, Mandate, and Immunity Issues.) and a member of the friendship groups with Japan, Slovenia, South Korea, and the Sovereign Order of Malta.

The SPO joined the SNS's political alliance in the buildup to the 2014 parliamentary election. Čikiriz received the ninety-second position on the alliance's Aleksandar Vučić—Future We Believe In list and was elected to a third term when the alliance won a landslide victory with 158 seats. In the 2014–16 term, Čikiriz was a member of the committee on constitutional affairs and legislation and the committee on the rights of the child; a deputy member of the administrative committee, the committee for Kosovo and Metohija, the health and family committee, the committee on defence and internal affairs, and the finance committee; a deputy member of Serbia's delegation to the Parliamentary Assembly of the Organization for Security and Co-operation in Europe (OSCE PA); and a member of the friendship groups with Australia, the Czech Republic, Denmark, France, Italy, Japan, Slovenia, South Korea, Spain, and the United States of America.

He received the 134th position on the SNS-led Aleksandar Vučić–Serbia Is Winning list in the 2016 parliamentary election and narrowly missed re-election when the list won 131 mandates. He was later appointed as a state secretary in Serbia's ministry of justice. As none of the SPO's three elected members left the assembly prior to the 2020 election, Čikiriz did not have the opportunity to return as a replacement.

Čikiriz was a vice-president of the SPO at the time that he left the party in 2017.

=== Movement for the Restoration of the Kingdom of Serbia ===
The SPO split in 2017, and a new party called the Movement for the Restoration of the Kingdom of Serbia (POKS) was established under Žika Gojković's leadership. Čikiriz joined the POKS, saying that its founders were dissatisfied with Vuk Drašković's continued leadership of SPO but did not want to attempt a disruptive takeover of that party. In leaving the SPO, Čikiriz accused Drašković of singling out the crimes committed by Serb forces in the Yugoslav Wars of the 1990s and ignoring the crimes of other sides. The POKS initially continued to support Serbia's SNS-led administration, and Čikiriz remained in his role as a state secretary.

In 2019, the Kragujevac city assembly voted to name an alley after Draža Mihailović. Čikiriz supported this decision, describing both Mihailović's Chetniks and the Yugoslav Partisans as having been anti-fascist forces in World War II.

He appeared in the third position on the POKS's For the Kingdom of Serbia electoral list in the 2020 Serbian parliamentary election. The list narrowly missed crossing the electoral threshold. He also led the POKS's list for Kragujevac in the concurrent 2020 Serbian local elections and was elected when the list won three mandates. Once again, his term in the local assembly was relatively brief. He was appointed as an assistant mayor on 5 November 2020, with responsibility for co-operation with churches and religious communities. (The city's other assistant mayors were appointed in September, but Čikiriz was required to wait until the end of his term as a state secretary before he could take office.) By virtue of holding an executive role, he was required to resign from the city assembly, which he did on 27 November.

In May 2021, he introduced a contract valued at seven million dollars to be spent on financing and co-financing projects sponsored by the city's different religious communities.

=== POKS split and after ===
The POKS split into rival factions in late 2021, respectively led by Žika Gojković and former Belgrade mayor Vojislav Mihailović. For several months, both Gojković and Mihailović claimed to be the legitimate leader of the party. Čikiriz was one of Gojković's most prominent allies in this intra-party division. On 28 December 2021, the group centered around Mihailović formally expelled both Gojković and Čikiriz from the POKS, a decision that they in turn rejected as invalid.

Gojković's POKS group contested the 2022 Serbian parliamentary election in an alliance with Dveri, and Čikiriz received the twelfth position on their combined electoral list. The list won ten seats, and he was not elected. Shortly after the election, Gojković's group lost the rights to the POKS name when Mihailović was formally recognized as the party's leader. Gojković's movement ceased to exist soon after this time.

Čikiriz continued to serve as an assistant mayor of Kragujevac until 30 October 2023, when the city's mayor resigned and a provisional administration was appointed pending a new election.

Čikiriz launched a new political movement in late 2023 called Kragujevac the Capital–Serbia the Kingdom, which contested the local election in an alliance with the Russian Party (RS). Čikirz appeared in the second position on the alliance's electoral list and was re-elected to the city assembly when the list won two mandates. He resigned his seat on 15 May 2024.
