= Goran Ivančević =

Serbian politician (born 1970)

Goran Ivančević (Serbian Cyrillic: Горан Иванчевић; born 27 March 1970) is a Serbian politician. He was elected to the Assembly of Vojvodina in the 2020 provincial election as a member of the Movement for the Restoration of the Kingdom of Serbia (Pokret obnove Kraljevine Srbije, POKS).

== Private life and career ==
Ivančević was born in Zrenjanin, Vojvodina, in what was then the Socialist Republic of Serbia in the Socialist Federal Republic of Yugoslavia. He holds a master's degree (2012) and a doctorate (2016) in political science from Educons University, a private institution in Novi Sad. His doctoral thesis was on Vojvodina's political system since the re-introduction of multi-party democracy in 1990.

He has served as deputy provincial secretary for regional development, inter-regional co-operation, and local self-government in the government of Vojvodina.

== Politician ==
Ivančević was a member of the executive board of the Serbian Renewal Movement until 2017, when he and other party officials resigned in protest against Vuk Drašković's continued leadership of the party. He subsequently became a founding member of the POKS and is its current secretary-general.

He received the lead position on the POKS electoral list for the Vojvodina provincial assembly in the 2020 provincial election and was elected when the list won five mandates. He is the leader of the POKS group in the assembly, the deputy chair of the committee on culture and public information, and a member of the committee for administrative and mandate issues. He also received the ninety-second position on the party's list for the National Assembly of Serbia in the concurrent 2020 Serbian parliamentary election. This list did not cross the electoral threshold to win seats in the assembly.

Ivančević holds right-wing views on issues of cultural identity. In the 2020 elections, he described migrant refugees in Serbia as a "security threat" and said that the country should close its borders to refugees, including those whom he described as "jihadists."
