= Bojana Jelić =

Serbian politician (born 1981)

Bojana Jelić (Serbian Cyrillic: Бојана Јелић; born 1981) is a politician in Serbia. She briefly served in the Assembly of Vojvodina in 2020 as a member of the Movement for the Restoration of the Kingdom of Serbia (Pokret obnove Kraljevine Srbije, POKS).

== Private life and career ==
Jelić was born in 1981 and lives in Novi Sad. She has a Bachelor of Laws degree. Her husband, Vladimir Jelić, has served in the city government of Novi Sad.

== Politician ==
Jelič received the fourth position on the POKS electoral list for the 2020 provincial election and was elected when the list won five mandates. Her term in office was brief; she resigned on 5 August 2020. She was replaced by fellow party member Duško Kočalka.

She also received the eighth position the POKS list for the National Assembly of Serbia in the concurrent 2020 Serbian parliamentary election. This list narrowly missed crossing the electoral threshold to win seats in the assembly.
