= Centre for Research of Orthodox Monarchism =

Serbian monarchist association

The Centre for Research of Orthodox Monarchism is a Serbian monarchist association, founded in Belgrade in 2001 and registered with the Ministry of Justice of the Federal Republic of Yugoslavia in May 2002.

== History ==
The founder and first director of the centre was Nebojša M. Krstić, also known as the founder of the far-right organisation Obraz. Nebojsha died in a traffic collision on 4 December 2001, and was succeeded as the director of the centre by Nenad M. Jovanovich, of the Serbian Orthodox Church. From 2008 until 2012 the director was Boško R. Marinkov, and since 2012 the director has been Nemanja S. Mrdjenović.

== Activities ==
The centre has five study committees and two volunteer sections. The five study committees are devoted to: heraldry and genealogical studies, cultural studies, historiography, state and legal studies, and theological studies. The two volunteer sections are the Serbian Orthodox Action ('Sabor') and the society for fighting addiction diseases ('Svitanje').

The centre operates under the high patronage of Crown Prince Alexander II of Yugoslavia and the spiritual patronage of Irinej Dobrijević, Bishop of the Metropolitanate of Australia and New Zealand of the Serbian Orthodox Church.

During their 'patron saint' celebration in June 2013, held at the Orthodox Theological Faculty of the University of Belgrade, with the blessings of Patriarch Irinej, the centre received support from senior representatives of the Serbian Orthodox Church, the Serbian Army, and Crown Prince Alexander II. In June 2014 the centre received a St. Emperor Constantine medal, awarded by the Holy Synod of the Serbian Orthodox Church.

== Research and publications ==
The centre is noted as an authority on Balkan heraldry. They have published books, including poetry and translations of monarchist books into Serbian. Their representatives participated in a number of international academic conferences. The official web site of CROM contains the largest collection of works on Orthodox monarchism in the Serbian language. The centre published a book titled "Православна монархија" ("Orthodox Monarchy").
