= Goran Rakovac =

Serbian politician

Goran Rakovac (Serbian Cyrillic: Горан Раковац; born 1 September 1961) is a Serbian politician. He was the mayor of Velika Plana from 2000 to 2004 and served in the National Assembly of Serbia from 2004 to 2008 as a member of Democratic Party of Serbia (Demokratska stranka Srbije, DSS).

== Private career ==
Rakovac holds a Bachelor of Laws degree.

== Politician ==
Rakovac received the twenty-second and final position on the DSS's electoral list for the Smederevo division in the 1993 Serbian parliamentary election. The list did not cross the electoral threshold to win representation in the assembly.

=== Mayor of Velika Plana ===
In 2000, the DSS became part of the Democratic Opposition of Serbia (Demokratska opozicija Srbije, DOS), a broad and ideologically diverse coalition of parties opposed to Slobodan Milošević's administration. DOS candidate Vojislav Koštunica defeated Milošević in the 2000 Yugoslavian presidential election, a watershed moment in Serbian and Yugoslavian politics. The DOS also won in several municipalities in the concurrent 2000 Serbian local elections; in Velika Plana, the alliance won a narrow majority victory with twenty out of thirty-nine seats in the local assembly. Rakovac was elected to the assembly and was subsequently chosen as its president, a position that was at the time equivalent to mayor. He also led the DSS's local municipal committee.

The government of Serbia fell after Milošević's defeat in the Yugoslavian election, and a new Serbian parliamentary election was called for December 2000. Serbia's electoral system was reformed prior to the vote, such that the entire country became a single electoral division and all mandates were awarded to candidates on successful lists at the discretion of the sponsoring parties or coalitions, irrespective of numerical order. Rakovac was given the 185th position on the DOS's list. The list won a landslide majority with 176 out of 250 seats, and he was not initially given a mandate.

Relations between the DSS and the rest of the DOS were often fraught, and the party left the alliance in 2002. On 12 June of that year, the DOS controversially removed a number of DSS politicians from the national assembly. Some of the vacant mandates were awarded to DSS members from the 2000 electoral list; others were awarded to representatives of various other parties still in the DOS. Rakovac was among the DSS candidates who received a replacement mandate. The party contended that the removal of its sitting members was illegitimate, and the new DSS delegates (including Rakovac) refused to serve. The appointments were later overturned on a technicality, and the original DSS members were returned to the assembly.

Rakovac served as mayor of Velika Plana until 2004, serving over a local coalition government that was fraught with serious divisions. He also served for a time as president of Serbia's Standing Conference of Towns and Municipalities. He did not seek re-election as mayor in 2004.

=== Parliamentarian ===
The DSS contested the 2003 Serbian parliamentary election on its own, and Rakovac received the sixty-sixth position on its list. The list won fifty-three mandates, and he was not initially included in the party's assembly delegation. He was, however, given a mandate on 12 February 2004 as the replacement for another party member. The DSS was the dominant force in Serbia's coalition government in the assembly term that followed, and Rakovac served as a supporter of the administration. In his first parliamentary term, he was deputy president of the committee for local self-government and also served on the committee for constitutional affairs, the legislative committee, and the committee for justice and administration.

For the 2007 Serbian parliamentary election, the DSS formed an electoral alliance with New Serbia (Nova Srbija, NS). Rakovac appeared in the fifty-first position on their combined list and was given a mandate for a second term when the list won forty-seven seats. The DSS formed an unstable coalition government with the rival Democratic Party (Demokratska stranka, DS) and G17 Plus after the election, and Rakovac again served as a supporter of the administration. In this term, he was a member of the legislative committee and the committee for local self-government.

The DS–DSS alliance collapsed in early 2008, and a new election was held in May of that year. The DSS and NS once again contested the election on a combined list, and Rakovac was included in the sixty-ninth position. The list won thirty seats, and he was not given a mandate for a third term. He has not sought a return to the assembly since this time.
