= Nenad M. Jovanovich =

Deacon of the Serbian Orthodox Church

Rev. Nenad M. Jovanovich is a Serbian Deacon of the Serbian Orthodox Church.

== Honours ==
- Royal House of Portugal: Knight Commander of the Order of Saint Michael of the Wing (September 2011)
