= Božidar Delić =

Serbian politician (1956–2022)

- Божидар Делић
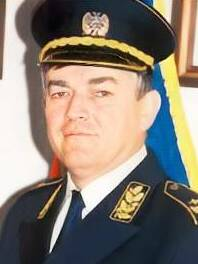
- Delić in 2004

Vice President of the National Assembly
- In office 2 August 2022 – 23 August 2022
- In office 22 May 2007 – 31 May 2012

Personal details
- Born: 20 February 1956 Đakovica, AR Kosovo and Metohija, PR Serbia, FPR Yugoslavia
- Died: 13 August 2022 (aged 66) Moscow, Russia
- Party: NN—IJS (2022); LJVN (2020–2022); SRS (2011–2020); SNS (2008–2011); SRS (2006–2008)
- Other political affiliations: NADA (2022)
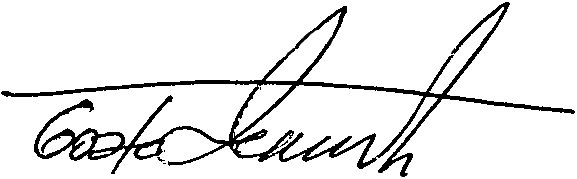
- Signature

Military service
- Allegiance: SFR Yugoslavia; Republika Srpska; FR Yugoslavia
- Branch/service: Yugoslav Ground Forces; Army of Republika Srpska; Yugoslav Army
- Rank: General
- Unit: 549th Motorized Brigade
- Battles/wars: Yugoslav Wars; Croatian War; Bosnian War; Kosovo War; Battle of Glođane; Albanian–Yugoslav border ambush (April 1998); Albanian-Yugoslav border clashes (July 1998); Attack on Orahovac; Battle of Junik; Battle of Košare; Battle of Paštrik

Božidar Delić (Serbian Cyrillic: Божидар Делић, pronounced [bǒʒidar dě:litɕ]; 20 February 1956 – 23 August 2022) was a Serbian general and politician who served as the vice president of the National Assembly of Serbia from 2007 to 2012 and again from 2 to 23 August 2022.

Initially a member of the Serbian Radical Party (SRS), Delić joined the Serbian Progressive Party (SNS) in 2008 and later returned to SRS in 2011. In 2020, Delić left SRS again and founded Love, Faith, Hope (LJVN) political organization along with Nemanja Šarović. He left LJVN in early 2022 and, shortly after, he was announced as the National Democratic Alternative coalition's ballot carrier for the 2022 Serbian parliamentary election.

== Early life and education ==
Delić was born on 20 February 1956 in Petrovac, a village near Đakovica, in the AR Kosovo and Metohija, PR Serbia, FPR Yugoslavia.

He attended the first four grades of elementary school in Petrovac, and the second four grades in Đakovica. Later he moved to Belgrade, where he graduated from the Military Academy of the Yugoslav Ground Forces and the National Defence School.

== Military career ==
After finishing his studies, he was assigned as an infantry lieutenant in Bileća, SR Bosnia and Herzegovina, and worked there at the training center for the training of reserve officers.

=== Yugoslav Wars ===
As a major, Delić participated in the Siege of Dubrovnik and remained there from 1991 to 1992. There he was promoted to the rank of lieutenant colonel. Then, with the consent of the superior command, he volunteered to go fight in Nevesinje, in the Bosnian War and was named Chief of Staff of the Bileća Brigade of the Army of Republika Srpska.

In 1995, he was reassigned to the position of commander of the 549th Motorized Brigade of the Yugoslav Army. He was a commander of this brigade during the Kosovo War and the NATO bombing of Yugoslavia in 1999. His brigade also included a group of Russian volunteers, the most famous of whom were Anatoly Lebed and Albert Andiev. After the signing of the Kumanovo Agreement, the Yugoslav Army had to withdraw from AP Kosovo and Metohija. He spent some time with the brigade in Leskovac, where the demobilization of volunteers, reservists and ranks whose military service ended, was organized. He was later promoted to the rank of one-star general.

On 16 August 2022, representatives of a Kosovar NGO from the town of Gjakova submitted lawsuits to Kosovo’s Special Prosecution, accusing Delić of war crimes in the villages of Meja and Krusha. Delić was previously investigated, but was never indicted and stated to the ICTY that he was unaware of the atrocities.

=== Post war military career ===
During the overthrow of Slobodan Milošević on 5 October 2000, Delić was the commander of the Belgrade Corps of the Yugoslav Army. His units did not intervene during the demonstrations.

From 2002 to 2005, he served in the Operational Directorate of the General Staff of the Yugoslav Army and the Army of Serbia and Montenegro. He was retired in 2005.

He appeared as a defense witness before the ICTY in the trials of Slobodan Milošević and Vladimir Lazarević.

== Political career ==
Delić was originally a member of the Serbian Radical Party (SRS) and was elected to the National Assembly under its banner in the 2007 Serbian parliamentary election. Subsequently, he was elected vice president of the National Assembly. He was re-elected vice president of the National Assembly following the 2008 parliamentary elections.

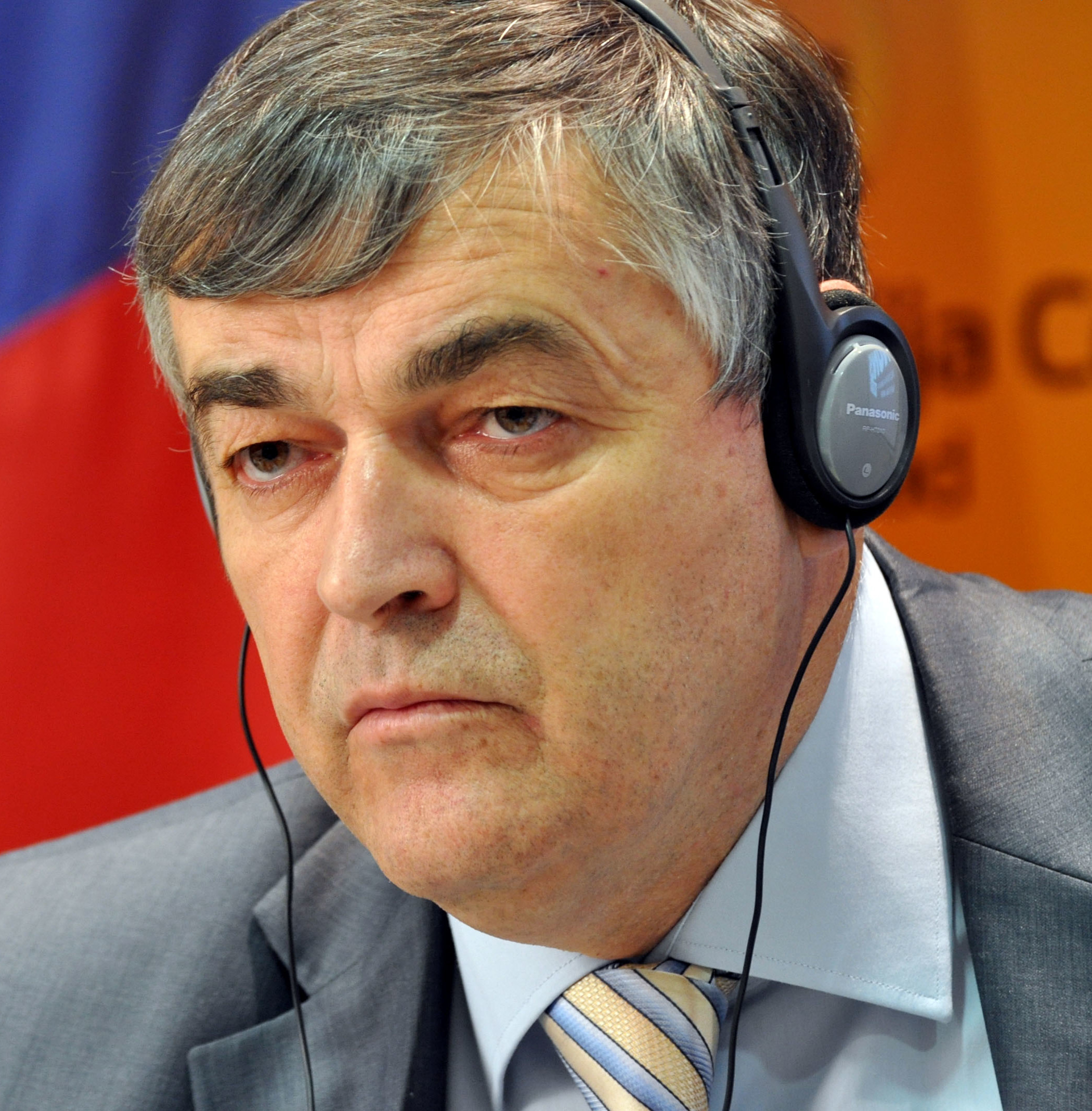
Delić in 2008

In September 2008, when there was a split in the Serbian Radical Party, he sided with Tomislav Nikolić and together with him founded the parliamentary club "Go Forward Serbia", and then the Serbian Progressive Party. In December 2010, Delić stated that "there have been disagreements between him and the leadership of the Serbian Progressive Party". In February 2011, he announced that he was leaving the Serbian Progressive Party and returning to the Serbian Radical Party.

As a member of SRS, he served as a member of the main board of the party and was re-elected MP in the 2016 parliamentary elections.

After the 2020 parliamentary elections, when the Serbian Radical Party failed to pass the electoral threshold, together with the vice president of the party Nemanja Šarović, he entered into a conflict with the party's long time president Vojislav Šešelj, as a result of which they were expelled from party membership. Shortly after, they founded the Love, Faith, Hope (LJVN) political subject, with Šarović being elected president and Delić vice president. In January 2022, it was announced that Delić had left LJVN and founded his own political group There's no Going Back – Serbia Is Behind.

In February 2022, National Democratic Alternative opposition coalition named Delić as their ballot carrier for the 2022 parliamentary election. Formally, his endorsement was from Bunjevci Citizens of Serbia, although he was not a member of the party. Following his election to the National Assembly after the 2022 election, Delić was elected vice president once again on 1 August.

== Death ==
Delić died of cancer on 23 August 2022, in Moscow, Russia, at the age of 66.
