= There's no Going Back – Serbia Is Behind =

Political party in Serbia

There's no Going Back – Serbia is Behind Нема назад – иза је Србија
- Abbreviation: NN–IJS
- President: Aleksandar Jerković
- Founder: Božidar Delić
- Founded: 27 January 2022
- Split from: Love, Faith, Hope
- Headquarters: Cerski venac 6, Belgrade
- Ideology: National conservatism; Veterans' rights
- Political position: Right-wing
- Colours: Red; Blue; White
- Slogan: "Za ljude koji razumeju budućnost" ("For the people who understand the future")
- National Assembly: 0 / 250
- Assembly of Vojvodina: 0 / 120
- City Assembly of Belgrade: 0 / 110

There's no Going Back – Serbia is Behind (Serbian: Нема назад – иза је Србија, Nema nazad – iza je Srbija, abbr. NN–IJS) is a right-wing political organisation in Serbia.

== History ==
There's no Going Back – Serbia is Behind (NN–IJS) was founded in January 2022 by retired major general of the Army of Serbia and Montenegro Božidar Delić. The movement is known to the public for its participation in the National Democratic Alternative (NADA) coalition in the 2022 general elections, when the movement's president, Božidar Delić, was the holder of the electoral list in the 2022 parliamentary election. Following Delić's death in August 2022, the movement has been led by Aleksandar Jerković, its sole member in the National Assembly of Serbia. In December 2022, the movement left NADA.

Despite still heading the organisation, Jerković joined the "We–The Voice from the People" citizens' group in November 2023.

== Organisation ==
=== List of presidents ===
#	President	Birth–Death	Term start	Term end
1	Božidar Delić	1956–2022	27 January 2022	23 August 2022
2	Aleksandar Jerković	1972–	23 August 2022	Incumbent

== Electoral performance ==
=== Parliamentary elections ===
National Assembly of Serbia
Year	Leader	Popular vote	% of popular vote	#	# of seats	Seat change	Coalition	Status	Ref.
2022	Božidar Delić	204,444	5.54%	▲4th	1 / 250	▲1	NADA	Opposition	

=== Presidential elections ===
President of Serbia
Year	Candidate	1st round popular vote		% of popular vote	2nd round popular vote		% of popular vote	Notes	Ref.
2022	Miloš Jovanović	3rd	226,137	6.10%	—N/a	—	—	Supported Jovanović	
