= National Democratic Alternative (Serbia) =

Political coalition in Serbia

National Democratic Alternative Национално демократска алтернатива
- Abbreviation: NADA
- Leader: Miloš Jovanović (Note: Jovanović announced his resignation as president of the New Democratic Party of Serbia on 26 October 2026.)
- Founder: Miloš Jovanović; Žika Gojković
- Founded: 26 January 2021
- Ideology: National conservatism; Euroscepticism; Monarchism
- Political position: Right-wing
- Colours: Red; Blue; Grey
- Slogan: Odvažno srpski! ('Boldly Serbian!')
- National Assembly: 0 / 250
- Assembly of Vojvodina: 8 / 120
- City Assembly of Belgrade: 0 / 110

Website
- nadazasrbiju.rs

The National Democratic Alternative (Serbian: Национално демократска алтернатива, romanized: Nacionalno demokratska alternativa; NADA, lit. 'hope') is a national-conservative political coalition in Serbia, composed of the New Democratic Party of Serbia (NDSS) and the Monarchists – Movement for the Kingdom of Serbia. Formed in 2021 by NDSS (then the Democratic Party of Serbia) and the Movement for the Restoration of the Kingdom of Serbia (POKS), it won seats in the 2022 and 2023 elections; POKS left the coalition in April 2026.

In the 2026 Serbian parliamentary election, the coalition ran as Authentic Right (Аутентична десница, Autentična desnica) and, according to preliminary results, won less than 1% of the vote, failing to enter the National Assembly. Its leader, Miloš Jovanović, announced his resignation as president of NDSS the following day.

== History ==
=== Formation ===
It was initially formed as a joint political platform between the Democratic Party of Serbia (DSS) and POKS in January 2021, and was expanded into a political coalition in May 2021. More than 20 citizens' associations later joined it. Matija Bećković and Ljubinko Đurković expressed their support for the coalition. Its presidential candidate for the 2022 election was Miloš Jovanović, while its ballot carrier for the parliamentary election was retired general Božidar Delić.

On 28 January 2022, Together for Šumadija, a minor political party from Kragujevac, joined the coalition.

In April 2026, the Movement for the Restoration of the Kingdom of Serbia (POKS), led by Vojislav Mihailović, officially withdrew from the coalition and formed its own parliamentary group in the National Assembly.

=== 2026 parliamentary election ===
Ahead of the 2026 snap parliamentary election, NDSS and the Monarchists signed a coalition agreement to run jointly under the name Authentic Right. The Main Board of the Monarchists stated that the list supported maximum cooperation with the European Union but opposed Serbia's membership in it, and called on supporters of restoring a constitutional parliamentary monarchy to vote for the list.

During signature collection, NDSS accused the local Serbian Progressive Party (SNS) branch in Obrenovac of sending employees of a municipal public utility company to give signatures to the list in an organised manner, alleging that a similar situation had occurred in Stari Grad. The Republic Electoral Commission proclaimed the list Authentic Right – Dr Miloš Jovanović – Boldly Serbian! on 18 September 2026, with 10,436 valid signatures and 250 candidates.

Besides Jovanović, the list includes NDSS vice-president Predrag Marsenić, Monarchists leader Vladimir Jelić, law professor Branislav Ristivojević, historian Bojan Dimitrijević, and non-partisan figures such as political scientist and outgoing MP Aleksandar Pavić and historian Nemanja Dević.

Two candidates on the list had previously cooperated with SNS. Jelić, third on the list, was fifth on the SNS-led list Aleksandar Vučić – For Our Children in the 2020 local election in Novi Sad, and served as a member of the Novi Sad City Council responsible for education until 2020. POKS later left the governing coalition in Novi Sad after SNS broke off its local coalitions with the party over disagreements on Kosovo policy. Miloš Tubić, head of the NDSS city board in Novi Sad and 46th on the list, was appointed director of the public utility company "Tržnica" in 2012, when the Democratic Party of Serbia was in coalition with SNS, and held the post until 2016.

According to preliminary results from the Republic Electoral Commission, with 96.9% of polling stations processed, the list won 38,286 votes (0.9%), well below the 3% electoral threshold, leaving the coalition without seats in the National Assembly for the first time since its formation. On election night, Jovanović took full responsibility for the result and congratulated the Student List on its victory. The following day, he announced that he was resigning as president of NDSS and withdrawing from public life.

== Political positions ==
It opposes the legalisation of same-sex civil unions, supports a proposal for the adoption of a declaration of support for Republika Srpska, and supports the restoration of the monarchy. In September 2021, it presented its programme for the 2022 elections. It opposed the 2022 constitutional referendum.

During the 2026 campaign, Jovanović said that cooperation with the European Union was "necessary and desirable", but that the coalition opposed membership, arguing that it would bring Serbia "more harm than good". He called for the question of EU membership to be decided in a referendum.

== Members ==
Name	Leader	Main ideology	Political position	National Assembly (Note: At the dissolution of the National Assembly on 9 September 2026.)	Assembly of Vojvodina	City Assembly of Belgrade
New Democratic Party of Serbia (NDSS)	Miloš Jovanović	National conservatism	Right-wing	7 / 250	8 / 120 (Note: Joint parliamentary group "NADA – New DSS and Monarchists".)	0 / 110
Monarchists – Movement for the Kingdom of Serbia (Monarhisti)	Vladimir Jelić; Dušan Radosavljević	National conservatism; Monarchism	Right-wing	3 / 250	8 / 120	0 / 110

=== Former members ===
Name	Leader	Main ideology	Political position	Years
Movement for the Restoration of the Kingdom of Serbia (POKS)	Žika Gojković; Vojislav Mihailović	National conservatism; Monarchism	Right-wing	2021–2026
Together for Šumadija (ZZŠ)	Veroljub Stevanović	Liberal conservatism; Regionalism	Centre-right	2022–2023
There's no Going Back – Serbia Is Behind (NN–IJS)	Božidar Delić; Aleksandar Jerković	National conservatism; Veterans' rights	Right-wing	2022–2023
Bunjevci Citizens of Serbia (BGS)	Bojana Jelić	Bunjevac minority interests		2022–2023

== Electoral performance ==
=== Parliamentary elections ===
Year	Leader		Popular vote	% of popular vote	#	# of seats in the National Assembly	Seat change	Status
Year	Name	Party	Popular vote	% of popular vote	#	# of seats in the National Assembly	Seat change	Status
2022	Božidar Delić	NN–IJS	204,442	5.54%	▲4th	15 / 250	▲15	Opposition
2023	Miloš Jovanović	NDSS	191,431	5.16%	4th	13 / 250	▼2	Opposition
2026	Miloš Jovanović	NDSS	39,503	0.90%	4th	0 / 250	▼13	Extra-parliamentary

=== Presidential elections ===
Year	Candidate		1st round popular vote		% of popular vote	2nd round popular vote		% of popular vote	Ref.
Year	Name	Party	1st round popular vote		% of popular vote	2nd round popular vote		% of popular vote	Ref.
2022	Miloš Jovanović	DSS	3rd	226,137	6.10%	—N/a	—	—	

=== Belgrade City Assembly elections ===
Year	Leader		Popular vote	% of popular vote	#	# of seats in the City Assembly	Seat change	Status
Year	Name	Party	Popular vote	% of popular vote	#	# of seats in the City Assembly	Seat change	Status
2022	Vojislav Mihailović	POKS	57,760	6.44%	▲5th	7 / 110	▲4	Opposition
2023	Vojislav Mihailović	POKS	56,415	6.13%	▲3rd	7 / 110	0	Snap election
2024	Vojislav Mihailović	POKS	Election boycott			0 / 110	▼7	Extra-parliamentary

=== Local elections ===
Date	Municipality	Popular vote	% of popular vote	Number of seats
28 March 2021	Kosjerić	485	7.29%	2 / 27
28 March 2021	Zaječar	674	2.69%	0 / 50
17 October 2021	Mionica	370	4.94%	2 / 39
17 October 2021	Negotin	322	2.26%	0 / 45
3 April 2022	Bajina Bašta	405	2.85%	0 / 45
3 April 2022	Knjaževac	539	3.79%	1 / 45
3 April 2022	Majdanpek	364	3.88%	1 / 45
