= Vojislav Mihailović =

Serbian politician

- Војислав Михаиловић
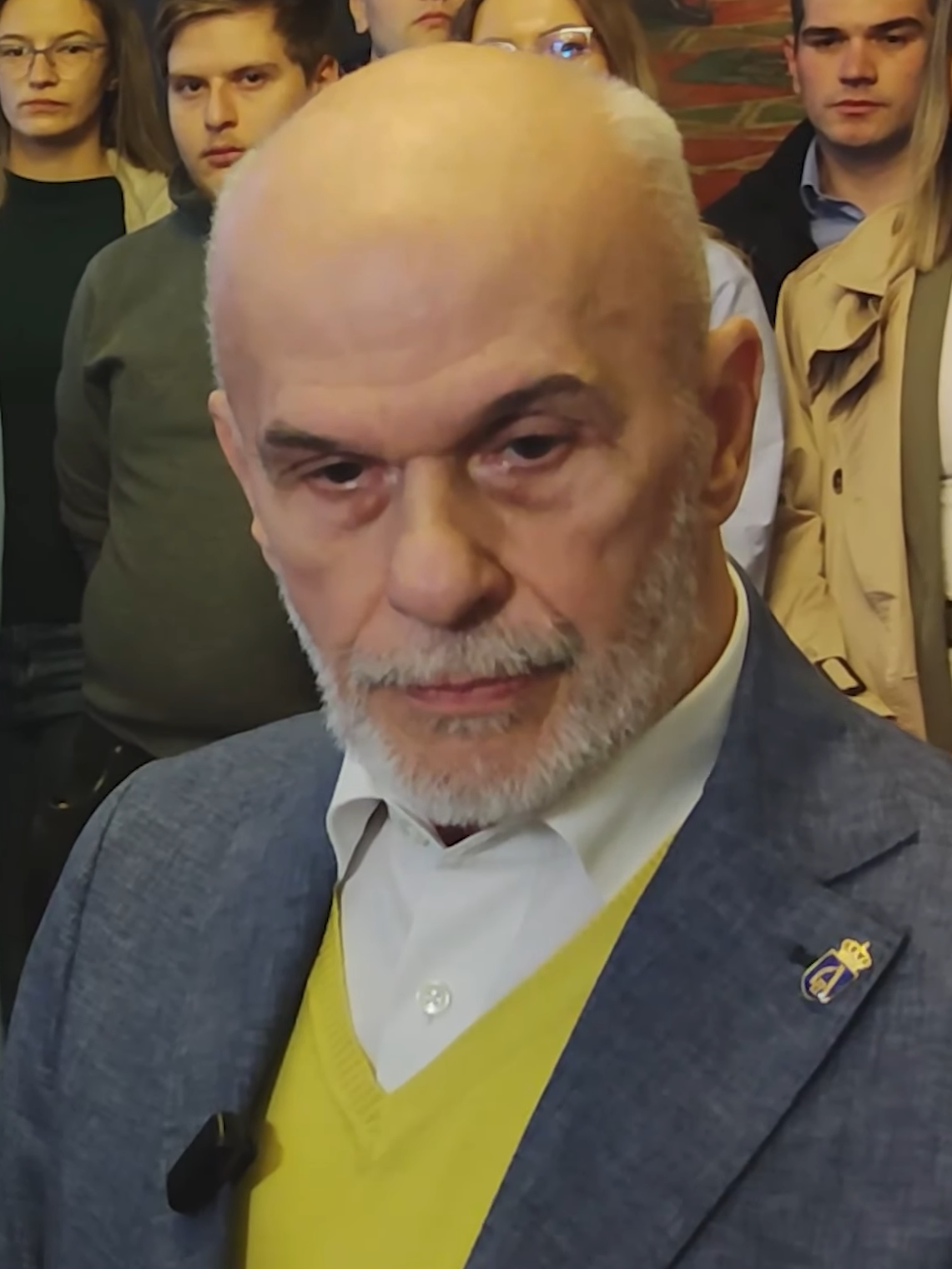
- Mihailović in 2023

Vice-President of the National Assembly
- In office 10 November 2022 – 6 February 2024
- In office 4 February 2004 – 14 February 2007
- In office 11 February 1994 – 22 January 1999

President of Serbia
- Acting
- In office 3 March 2004 – 4 March 2004
- Prime Minister: Zoran Živković
- Preceded by: Dragan Maršićanin (acting)
- Succeeded by: Predrag Marković (acting)

Mayor of Belgrade
- In office 22 January 1999 – 5 October 2000
- Preceded by: Milan Božić (acting)
- Succeeded by: Milan St. Protić

Personal details
- Born: 9 March 1951 (age 75) Belgrade, PR Serbia, FPR Yugoslavia
- Party: SPO (1990–2005); SDPO (2005–2010); SNP (2014–2016); POKS (2018–present)
- Children: 2
- Education: University of Belgrade
- Nickname: Vojo

Vojislav Mihailović (Serbian Cyrillic: Војислав Михаиловић; born 3 September 1951) is a Serbian politician who served as the mayor of Belgrade from 1999 to 2000. As of January 2022, he has been the president of the Movement for the Restoration of the Kingdom of Serbia (POKS). He is a grandson of Draža Mihailović, the leader of Chetniks during World War II.

A long-time member of the Serbian Renewal Movement (SPO), he left the party in 2005 after a party split, becoming one of the founders and co-president of the Serbian Democratic Renewal Movement (SDPO). In 2014, he joined the Serbian People's Party (SNP), left it in 2016, and then in 2018 he joined POKS. He has served as vice-president of the National Assembly of Serbia from 1994 to 1999, from 2004 to 2007, and again from 2022 to 2024.

== Early life and private career ==
Mihailović was born on 3 September 1951 in Belgrade, in the PR Serbia, Federal People's Republic of Yugoslavia. He finished primary school in Belgrade and then graduated from the Faculty of Law at the University of Belgrade in 1980.

After finishing his studies, he worked as a lawyer, and later he founded a private business. He used to be a co-owner of a company that imports Pampers diapers.

== Political career ==
=== SPO (1993–2005) ===
He joined the monarchist Serbian Renewal Movement (SPO) headed by Vuk Drašković in 1993, and a year later, he was named a member of the party presidency. He was elected MP in the 1993 parliamentary elections, elected vice-president of the National Assembly and later re-elected to both positions in the 1997 parliamentary elections.

When Zoran Đinđić was removed from office as the mayor of Belgrade at the initiative of SPO and help from the then ruling Socialist Party of Serbia (SPS) in late 1997, the office was vacant for more than a year, with Milan Božić serving as the acting mayor. Following the vacancy period, Mihailović was elected Mayor of Belgrade on 22 January 1999. Mihailović ran as SPO candidate for President of Federal Republic Yugoslavia in the 2000 Yugoslav general elections, winning 2.95% of the popular vote. Following the overthrow of Slobodan Milošević, Mihailović was succeeded as mayor by Milan St. Protić.

Mihailović was once again elected MP in the 2003 parliamentary election, and later the vice-president of the National Assembly. He served as the acting president of Serbia for one day, from 3 to 4 March 2004. In December 2004, Mihailović, along with Veroljub Stevanović and other SPO high-ranking members, published a letter, accusing the party leadership for "misapproriating 136,000 euros from the state budget, while some local party boards did not have funds for utilities and telephone bills". Danica Drašković, the wife of SPO leader Vuk Drašković, responded by accusing the then prime minister of Serbia, Vojislav Koštunica, and the director of the Security Intelligence Agency (BIA), Rade Bulatović, for being behind the letter and sued the signatories of the letter for defamation. In March 2005, Mihailović announced that he was leaving SPO.

=== SDPO (2005–2010) ===
In May 2005, Mihailović, along with Veroljub Stevanović, founded the centre-right Serbian Democratic Renewal Movement (SDPO), while he and Stevanović were elected co-presidents of the newly formed party. Nine SPO MP's joined SDPO following a party split. In the 2007 parliamentary election, SDPO participated in a coalition with New Serbia (NS) and Democratic Party of Serbia, with SDPO gaining two seats and Mihailović being elected MP once again. In late 2007, the president of Together for Kragujevac, also the co-president of the SDPO, signed a coalition agreement with the leader of G17 Plus, Mlađan Dinkić, which Mihailović opposed. SDPO did not participate in the 2008 parliamentary election and the party dissolved in 2010.

=== SNP (2014–2016) ===
In December 2014, Mihailović spoke at the founding assembly of the Serbian People's Party (SNP) headed by Nenad Popović, and became a member of the SNP presidency. During his speech at the founding assembly of SNO, Mihailović stated that "SNP will strive to preserve the identity of Serbs in the region, the ties between the motherland and the diaspora".

=== POKS (2018–present) ===
In 2018, Mihailović joined the Movement for the Restoration of the Kingdom of Serbia, another break-away faction of SPO. He was the party's ballot carrier in the 2018 Belgrade City Assembly election, however, POKS only won 0.53% of the popular vote and failed to pass the electoral threshold. He was later named member of the party presidency and elected vice-president of POKS.

In December 2021, conflict arose between the president of POKS, Žika Gojković, and Mihailović. On 23 December 2021, it was reported that the POKS presidency, led by Mihailović, had met to remove Gojković from the office of president, on the grounds that his four-year term had expired in October. POKS official Miloš Parandilović stated that the aforementioned meeting had been "illegitimately convened by a group of party officials seeking to carry out a coup" and that Gojković was still the legitimate president. Mihailović's faction announced on 28 December that Gojković and his prominent ally Mirko Čikiriz had been expelled from the party. Mihailović's faction held an assembly in Belgrade on 3 January 2022 and elected Mihailović as president of POKS. Shortly after, Mihailović was recognised as legitimate president by POKS's coalition partner, the Democratic Party of Serbia and its leader Miloš Jovanović and Mihailović was announced as the National Democratic Alternative (NADA) coalition's candidate for Mayor of Belgrade in the upcoming 2022 Belgrade City Assembly election. Due to Gojković still legally representing the POKS leadership, Mihailović had to register under the "For the Kingdom of Serbia" organisation for the 2022 elections.

On 10 November 2022, he was sworn in as vice-president of the National Assembly.

== Personal life ==
Vojislav Mihailović is a grandson of Draža Mihailović, leader of the royalist Chetniks during the World War II, and has led the political rehabilitation process of his grandfather until the High Court in Belgrade rehabilitated him and restored his civil rights in 2015. At the time of Mihailović's birth, his father, Branko, was a prisoner on Goli Otok.

He is married and has two children.

Government offices
| Preceded by Dragan Maršićanin; Acting | President of Serbia; Acting; 2004 | Succeeded by Predrag Marković; Acting |
Political offices
| Preceded by Zoran Đinđić | Mayor of Belgrade; 1999 – 2000 | Succeeded by Milan St. Protić |
