= Žika Gojković =

Serbian politician

- Жика Гојковић
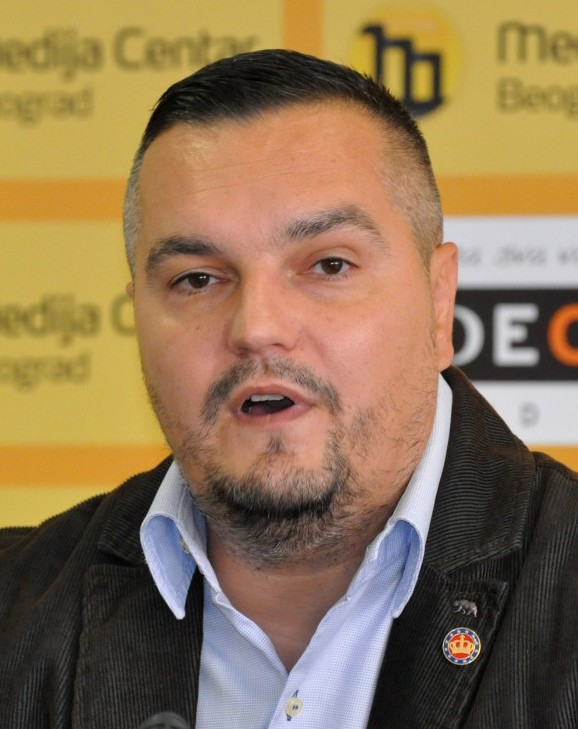
- Gojković in 2017

Member of the National Assembly of the Republic of Serbia
- Incumbent
- Assumed office 1 August 2022
- In office 11 June 2008 – 3 August 2020

Leader of the Movement for the Restoration of the Kingdom of Serbia
- In office 3 June 2017 – 1 August 2022 (Claim to leadership disputed from 23 December 2021 to 1 August 2022.)
- Preceded by: position created
- Succeeded by: Vojislav Mihailović

Personal details
- Born: 9 November 1972 (age 53) Sombor, SR Serbia, SFR Yugoslavia
- Party: SPO (1992–2017); POKS (2017–2022); SNS (2023–present)
- Occupation: Politician

Žika Gojković (Serbian Cyrillic: Жика Гојковић; born 9 November 1972) is a Serbian politician. He is currently serving his sixth term in Serbia's national assembly.

At one time a leading figure in the Serbian Renewal Movement (SPO), Gojković founded the breakaway Movement for the Restoration of the Kingdom of Serbia (POKS) in 2017. In late 2021, the POKS became divided into rival groups led by Gojković and former Belgrade mayor Vojislav Mihailović. For several months, both Gojković and Mihailović claimed to be the legitimate party leader. Gojković legally headed the party until 1 August 2022, when the Serbian ministry of public administration and local self-government ruled in favour of Mihailović. Gojković joined the Serbian Progressive Party (SNS) in late 2023.

== Early life and private career ==
Gojković was born in Sombor, in what was then the Socialist Autonomous Province of Vojvodina in the Socialist Republic of Serbia, Socialist Federal Republic of Yugoslavia. He has a Bachelor of Management Studies degree in economy and was elected president of Sombor's sports association in 2014.

== Politician ==
=== Serbian Renewal Movement ===
Gojković chaired the SPO's Vojvodina provincial board for several years and was a party vice-president at the republic level.

==== Early candidacies ====
Gojković was included on the SPO's electoral lists in the 2000, 2003, and 2007 Serbian parliamentary elections, although he did not receive a mandate on any of these occasions. In 2000 and 2007, the SPO list failed to cross the electoral threshold. The party contested the 2003 election in an alliance with New Serbia (NS) and won twenty-two seats; Gojković appeared in the forty-ninth position and was not chosen for a mandate. (From 2000 to 2011, assembly mandates were awarded to sponsoring parties or coalitions rather than to individual candidates, and it was common practice for the mandates to be assigned out of numerical order. Gojković could have been included in his party's delegation despite his relatively low position on the list, but ultimately he was not.)

The SPO contested the 2004 Vojvodina provincial election as part of the Clean Hands of Vojvodina coalition. Gojković appeared in the eleventh position on its list, which did not cross the electoral threshold.

==== Parliamentarian ====
For the 2008 Serbian parliamentary election, the SPO joined the For a European Serbia (ZES) coalition led by Boris Tadić's Democratic Party (DS). Gojković received the thirty-ninth position on the ZES list, which won 102 seats. On this occasion, he was given a mandate. The election did not produce a clear winner, but For a European Serbia ultimately formed a coalition government with the Socialist Party of Serbia (SPS), and Gojković served as a supporter of the administration. In his first parliamentary term, he was a member of the committee on constitutional affairs, the committee on youth and sports, and the committee on agriculture; a deputy member of the committee on defense and security and the committee on trade and tourism; and a member of the parliamentary friendship groups with Australia, Italy, and the Sovereign Order of Malta.

Serbia's electoral system was reformed in 2011, such that all parliamentary mandates were awarded to candidates on successful lists in numerical order. The SPO contested the 2012 parliamentary election in an alliance with the Liberal Democratic Party (LDP) called U-Turn (Preokret); Gojković received the thirteenth position on the alliance's list and was re-elected when it won nineteen mandates. The Serbian Progressive Party (SNS) won the election and afterward formed a new coalition government with the SPS and other parties; the SPO served in opposition. Gojković was a member of the finance committee (Note: Formally known as the Committee on Finance, Budget, and Control of Public Spending.) and the committee on the diaspora and Serbs in the region, a deputy member of Serbia's delegation to the Parliamentary Assembly of the Organization for Security and Co-operation in Europe (OSCE PA), and a member of the parliamentary friendship groups with Austria and the United States of America.

The SPO joined the SNS's political alliance in the buildup to the 2014 parliamentary election. Gojković received the forty-first position on the SNS-led Future We Believe In list and was elected to a third term when the list won a landslide victory with 158 out of 250 mandates. In the 2014–16 term, he was a member of the finance committee and the defence and internal affairs committee, a deputy member of the diaspora committee, the leader of Serbia's friendship group with Brazil, and a member of the friendship groups with France, Italy, the Netherlands, and the United States.

He received the eighty-second position on the Progressive Party's Aleksandar Vučić–Serbia Is Winning list in the 2016 parliamentary election and was re-elected when the alliance won a second consecutive majority with 131 seats. The SPO did not win enough seats to form its own assembly group, and the party's delegates served in caucus with the Progressives.

In his fourth national assembly term, Gojković was a member (and later a deputy member) of the finance committee, a deputy member of the foreign affairs committee, once again the head of Serbia's parliamentary friendship group with Brazil, and a member of its parliamentary friendship groups with France, Georgia, Italy, the Netherlands, and the United States.

==== Local politics ====
The SPO contested the 2004 Serbian local elections in Sombor in an alliance with the People's Democratic Party (NDS). The alliance won five seats; Gojković appeared on its list and was included afterward in the SPO's municipal assembly delegation. He was re-elected in the 2008, 2012, and 2016 local elections, although on each occasion he resigned his seat shortly thereafter.

=== Movement for the Restoration of the Kingdom of Serbia ===
Several SPO members, including Gojković, were expelled from the party in May 2017 after recommending that longtime leader Vuk Drašković step down from his position to become an honorary president. The following month, a number of prominent former SPO members established the POKS. The new organization was registered as a party on 17 July 2017, and Gojković was chosen as its leader on 15 October. He continued to caucus with the Progressive Party, noting the POKS's good relations with the SNS and with Serbian president Aleksandar Vučić.

In February 2020, he called for the direct election of mayors and two-thirds of local assembly members.

The POKS contested the 2020 Serbian parliamentary election on a coalition list called For the Kingdom of Serbia. Gojković was the list bearer, although he agreed to have Ljubinko Đurković appear ahead of him in the first position. The list narrowly missed crossing the electoral threshold to win representation in the assembly.

=== POKS split and after ===
On 23 December 2021, a group identifying itself as the POKS presidency removed Gojković as leader on the grounds that his four-year term had expired in October. POKS official Miloš Parandilović said that the meeting had been illegitimately convened and that Gojković was still the party's leader.

The group identifying itself as the POKS presidency announced on 28 December 2021 that Gojković and his prominent ally Mirko Čikiriz had been expelled from the party. Gojković's supporters rejected this announcement, stating that Serbia's ministry of public administration and local self-government had issued a statement the previous day identifying him as the party's only legitimate representative. Gojković's group held an assembly in Topola on 2 January 2022, at which time he was re-affirmed as party leader. The rival group held an assembly in Belgrade on 3 January and elected Vojislav Mihailović as leader.

In the aftermath of the split, Mihailović accused Gojković of concealing his appointment by the Serbian government as a director of Mtel, a telecommunications company in Montenegro primarily owned by the state company Telekom Srbija. Mihailovic's supporters further asserted that the appointment was evidence of collusion between Gojković and Vučić's government. Gojković rejected this, saying that he received only minimal compensation for serving as a director (which he had reported in any event) and that it was not evidence of ongoing ties to the SNS.

Gojković announced in February 2022 that his POKS group would contest the upcoming presidential, parliamentary, and Belgrade elections in an alliance with Dveri. He appeared in the second position on the alliance's Patriotic Bloc for the Restoration of the Kingdom of Serbia list in the parliamentary election and was elected to a fifth term when the list won ten mandates, six of which were assigned to Dveri members and four to POKS members. Soon after the election, Gojković's group lost the rights to the POKS name when Mihailović was recognized as the party's legitimate leader.

In August 2022, Gojković and two of the other three delegates in his group voted for SNS candidate Vladimir Orlić to become the new president of the national assembly. The fourth ex-POKS delegate, Miloš Parandilović, voted against Orlić and ended his affiliation with Gojković. Parandilović later charged Gojković with seeking to join Serbia's SNS-led administration and of surrendering his claim to the POKS leadership after the election, thereby allowing Mihailović to take over the party.

In the 2022–24 assembly term, Gojković was a member of the assembly's defence and internal affairs committee, a member of Serbia's delegation to the Parliamentary Assembly of the Francophonie (where Serbia has associate member status), and a member of the friendship groups with Argentina, the Bahamas, Italy, Slovenia, and the United States. He served in a parliamentary group with members of the Justice and Reconciliation Party (SPP), the United Peasant Party (USS), and the Democratic Alliance of Croats in Vojvodina (DSHV).

=== Serbian Progressive Party ===
In October 2023, Gojković joined the Serbian Progressive Party. He appeared in the 117th position on the SNS alliance's list in the 2023 Serbian parliamentary election and was re-elected when it won a majority victory with 129 seats. He is now a member of the education committee (Note: Formally known as the Committee on Education, Science, Technological Development and the Information Society.) and the agriculture committee, (Note: Formally known as the Committee on Agriculture, Forestry, and Water Management.) a deputy member of the committee on constitutional and legislative issues, and a member of the friendship groups with Italy and the Holy See, Malta, Spain, and the United States of America.
