= Movement for the Restoration of the Kingdom of Serbia =

Political party in Serbia

Movement for the Restoration of the Kingdom of Serbia Покрет обнове Краљевине Србије
- Abbreviation: POKS
- President: Vojislav Mihailović (Note: A rival faction elected Vladimir Jelić as president on 21 June 2025; it has since used the name "Monarchists" and remained in the NADA coalition. Mihailović remains registered as the party's president.)
- Founder: Žika Gojković
- Founded: 3 June 2017; 9 years ago
- Registered: 17 July 2017; 9 years ago
- Split from: Serbian Renewal Movement
- Headquarters: Dobračina 44, Belgrade
- Ideology: National conservatism; Monarchism
- Political position: Right-wing
- Colours: Blue
- National Assembly: 0 / 250
- Assembly of Vojvodina: 3 / 120
- City Assembly of Belgrade: 0 / 110

Website
- srbijakraljevina.rs

The Movement for the Restoration of the Kingdom of Serbia (Serbian: Покрет обнове Краљевине Србије, romanised: Pokret obnove Kraljevine Srbije, abbr. POKS) is a monarchist and national-conservative political party in Serbia. It was founded in 2017 by Žika Gojković and other members expelled from the Serbian Renewal Movement (SPO), and initially cooperated with the ruling Serbian Progressive Party (SNS).

It ran separately in 2020, narrowly failing to enter the National Assembly, and in 2021 formed the National Democratic Alternative (NADA) opposition coalition with the Democratic Party of Serbia (DSS). In December 2021, it split into rival groups led by Gojković and former Belgrade mayor Vojislav Mihailović; the ministry responsible for the register of political parties recognised Mihailović as president in 2022. As part of NADA, POKS entered the National Assembly in 2022 and 2023. A second leadership dispute in June 2025 led most of the party's leadership to form a rival faction, later known as the Monarchists, which stayed in NADA, while Mihailović's POKS left the coalition in April 2026. It did not contest the 2026 parliamentary election.

== History ==
=== Formation and cooperation with SNS ===
POKS was formed on 3 June 2017, shortly after Gojković and others were expelled from the SPO for recommending that party leader Vuk Drašković step down and become honorary president. The new party was registered on 17 July 2017, and Gojković was elected its president on 15 October 2017.

Before the split, Gojković was one of three SPO members of the National Assembly, all of whom had been elected in the 2016 election on the SNS-led electoral list and sat in the SNS parliamentary group. Gojković remained in the SNS group after leaving the SPO and, on becoming POKS president, noted the party's good relations with SNS and with President Aleksandar Vučić. All three SPO members of the Assembly of Vojvodina also joined POKS.

On 12 October 2017, the Christian Democratic Party of Serbia (DHSS) merged into POKS; its president, Olgica Batić, expressed support for the party's goals of traditional values, preserving the family, support for Serbian farmers and Serbia's membership of the European Union. POKS briefly gained a second member of the National Assembly in May 2018, when Nada Kostić, elected on the Enough Is Enough list, joined the party; she left shortly afterwards to sit as an independent.

=== 2020 elections and NADA ===
POKS contested the 2020 parliamentary election in the "For the Kingdom of Serbia" (ZKS) alliance with smaller groups, including the Monarchist Front and the Movement of Serbian Monarchists. Gojković was the ballot carrier, while Ljubinko Đurković was the first candidate on the list. The list won 2.77% of the vote and narrowly missed the electoral threshold, even after voting was repeated at several polling stations. In the concurrent provincial election, it won five seats in the Assembly of Vojvodina, where its group was led by Goran Ivančević.

On 26 January 2021, POKS and the Democratic Party of Serbia (DSS) signed an agreement on joint action and a common political platform, the National Democratic Alternative (NADA), which was formalised as a pre-electoral coalition in May 2021.

=== December 2021 split ===
On 23 December 2021, the POKS presidency met and removed Gojković as president on the grounds that his four-year term had expired in October; it also dissolved the party's Belgrade board for "inactivity" and appointed Mihailović as its commissioner. POKS spokesperson Miloš Parandilović said that the meeting had been convened illegitimately by a group of officials attempting a coup, as only the president or vice-president could convene the presidency.

On 28 December, the group around Mihailović announced that Gojković and his ally Mirko Čikiriz had been expelled from the party. Gojković's allies rejected this, and said that the Ministry of Public Administration and Local Self-Government had issued a certificate on 27 December identifying Gojković as the party's only legitimate representative.

Both groups held electoral assemblies in early January 2022: Gojković's group confirmed him as president in Topola on 2 January, and the rival group elected Mihailović in Belgrade the following day. On 15 January, Gojković's group ended the alliance with the DSS, accusing it of siding with Mihailović, while Mihailović's group confirmed its place in NADA the same day. In February 2022, Gojković's group agreed to contest the 2022 general election with Dveri, and RIK proclaimed their joint list on 23 February, while NADA said that the authorities were preventing POKS from taking part in the election. In July 2022, the ministry concluded that Mihailović was the party's legitimate president, giving his group the exclusive right to use the POKS name.

=== 2022–2025: NADA in the National Assembly ===
POKS ran on the NADA list in the 2022 and 2023 parliamentary elections, in which the coalition won 5.54% and 5.16% of the vote respectively. NADA also won seats in the City Assembly of Belgrade in 2022 and 2023, and in the Assembly of Vojvodina in 2023. NADA leader Miloš Jovanović said that it would not take part in the 2024 Belgrade election, which he described as "electoral theft".

In June 2025, a group of POKS officials, including vice-president Vladimir Jelić and MP Dušan Radosavljević, launched a procedure to remove Mihailović, accusing him of trying to break up the coalition with the New DSS; Mihailović called a rival assembly and described their move as "an attempt at deception". On 21 June, an extraordinary assembly in Kragujevac elected Jelić as president and named Mihailović honorary president, while the next day an assembly in Belgrade re-elected Mihailović and expelled Jelić, Radosavljević and Nenad Tomašević. Mihailović remained registered as the party's president.

=== 2026: Departure from NADA ===
In March 2026, Mihailović's POKS announced that it would not take part in the 2026 local elections, which he described as a "farce", and called on its supporters to vote for lists led by students and citizens' groups. On 7 April 2026, it left NADA, saying that it no longer wanted to share a political front with individuals whose scandals "cast a shadow over the genuine opposition struggle", and formed a parliamentary group with Mihailović, Vladimir Đorđević, Ljubinko Đurković, Igor Braunović, elected on the SPS list, and Slobodan Nikolić of the Russian Party. The rival faction, by then called the Monarchists – Movement for the Kingdom of Serbia, distanced itself from the move, saying that Mihailović had joined MPs close to the government; Radosavljević said that it would use only the name "Monarchists" to distinguish itself from those who "serve the regime" under the POKS name, and that it would remain in partnership with the New DSS. Later that month, Nikolić joined a new group formed by the Workers' Party, the Russian Party and the United Peasant Party, and POKS had no parliamentary group when the National Assembly was dissolved in September 2026. POKS did not field or join a list in the 2026 snap parliamentary election.

== Ideology and platform ==
POKS is a right-wing party that advocates the restoration of the monarchy. It has also been described as national-conservative and conservative. It is Eurosceptic.

POKS is generally further to the right than the SPO on issues of national identity. When the party was formed, founding member and former MP Mirko Čikiriz accused Drašković of singling out crimes committed by Serb forces during the Yugoslav Wars while ignoring those of other sides. During the 2020 provincial election campaign, Ivančević described migrants in Serbia as a "security threat" and said that the country should close its borders to refugees, including those he described as "jihadists".

== Organisation ==
=== List of presidents ===
#	President		Birth–Death	Term start	Term end
1	Žika Gojković	Žika Gojković	1972–	15 October 2017	3 January 2022
2	Vojislav Mihailović	Vojislav Mihailović	1951–	3 January 2022	Incumbent

== Electoral performance ==
=== Parliamentary elections ===
National Assembly
Year	Leader	Popular vote	% of popular vote	#	# of seats	Seat change	Coalition	Status	Ref.
2020	Žika Gojković	85,888	2.77%	4th	0 / 250	▼1	ZKS	Extra-parliamentary	
2022	Vojislav Mihailović	204,444	5.54%	4th	7 / 250	▲7	NADA	Opposition	
2023	Vojislav Mihailović	191,431	5.16%	4th	6 / 250	▼1	NADA	Opposition	
2026	Vojislav Mihailović	Did not participate			0 / 250	▼6	–	Extra-parliamentary	

=== Presidential elections ===
President of Serbia
Year	Candidate	1st round popular vote		% of popular vote	2nd round popular vote		% of popular vote	Notes	Ref.
2022	Miloš Jovanović	3rd	226,137	6.10%	—N/a	—	—	Supported Jovanović	

=== Provincial elections ===
Assembly of Vojvodina
Year	Leader	Popular vote	% of popular vote	#	# of seats	Seat change	Coalition	Status	Ref.
2020	Žika Gojković	34,083	4.21%	6th	5 / 120	▲5	ZKS	Opposition	
2023	Vojislav Mihailović	50,582	5.30%	▲4th	3 / 120	▼2	NADA	Opposition	

=== Belgrade City Assembly elections ===
City Assembly of Belgrade
Year	Leader	Popular vote	% of popular vote	#	# of seats	Seat change	Coalition	Status	Ref.
2018	Žika Gojković	4,291	0.53%	12th	0 / 110	0	–	Extra-parliamentary	
2022	Vojislav Mihailović	57,760	6.44%	▲5th	3 / 110	▲3	NADA	Opposition	
2023	Vojislav Mihailović	56,415	6.13%	▲3rd	3 / 110	0	NADA	Snap election	
2024	Vojislav Mihailović	Election boycott			0 / 110	▼3	NADA	Extra-parliamentary	
