= Independent Serbian Party =

Political party in Serbia

The Independent Serbian Party (Serbian: Самостална српска странка, romanized: Samostalna Srpska Stranka, Samostalna) is a conservative political party in Serbia. It was founded in February 2020 via a merger of the Independent Democratic Party of Serbia (Samostalni DSS), the Movement for the Development of Serbia, and the National Democratic Political Council. Samostalna's leader is Andreja Mladenović, a former parliamentarian and deputy mayor of Belgrade.

Samostalna contested the 2022 Belgrade City Assembly election as part of the Serbian Progressive Party (SNS)'s coalition and won one seat in the City Assembly of Belgrade.

== Antecedents ==
=== Movement for the Development of Serbia ===
The Movement for the Development of Serbia was founded by military equipment entrepreneur Mile Dragić in October 2011. The party contested the 2012 Serbian local elections on its own in some jurisdictions, including Pančevo and the Niš municipality of Crveni Krst; in both of these areas, it finished well below the electoral threshold for assembly representation. In Sremska Mitrovica, it was part of the SNS's alliance.

The party mostly became inactive after 2012, although it supported the Socialist Party of Serbia (SPS)'s alliance in Sremska Mitrovica in the 2016 local elections.

=== Independent Democratic Party of Serbia ===
The Samostalni DSS was established in 2015 by former members of the Democratic Party of Serbia (DSS). In July 2015, DSS leader Sanda Rašković Ivić expelled Andreja Mladenović and six of the party's delegates in the Belgrade assembly on the grounds that they were trying to turn the party into a satellite of the SNS. The expelled members originally intended for the Samostalni DSS to be a fraction within the DSS, but it soon became a distinct party. Its founding convention took place in October 2015, and Mladenović was chosen as leader.

Mladenović was the deputy mayor of Belgrade at the time of the Samostalni DSS's formation and remained in this role until 2018. He was also elected to Serbia's national assembly as a Samostlani DSS candidate in the 2016 parliamentary election, with an endorsement from the SNS. He resigned his assembly seat in October 2016, as he could not hold a dual mandate as a parliamentarian and deputy mayor of Belgrade.

The Samostalni DSS seems to have become largely inactive as an organization by 2017, although Mladenović was re-elected to the Belgrade assembly in the 2018 Belgrade City Assembly election. Formally, his endorsement was from the SNS. He was briefly the acting mayor of Belgrade in May–June 2018 before becoming an assistant to new mayor Zoran Radojičić.

== Formation and ideology ==
Samostalna was established on 19 February 2020. Andreja Mladenović was chosen as party president and Mile Dragić as vice-president. The party situated itself in the political legacy of parties such as the Independent Radical Party and the Democratic Party of Serbia.

== Electoral history ==
=== 2020 elections ===
Samostalna fielded its own electoral list in the Belgrade municipality of Barajevo in the 2020 Serbian local elections. The party received 9.37% of the vote and won three seats.

=== 2022 elections ===
Samostalna supported Aleksandar Vučić's successful bid for re-election as president of Serbia in the 2022 Serbian presidential election.

The party received two places on the SNS's electoral list in the 2022 Belgrade election. Andreja Mladenović appeared in the eighth position and was elected when the list won a plurality victory with forty-eight out of 110 seats. He resigned from the assembly on 18 August 2022 and was replaced by the party's other candidate, former DSS and Samostalni DSS delegate Dejan Čulić.
