= Toma Fila =

Serbian lawyer and politician

- Тома Фила
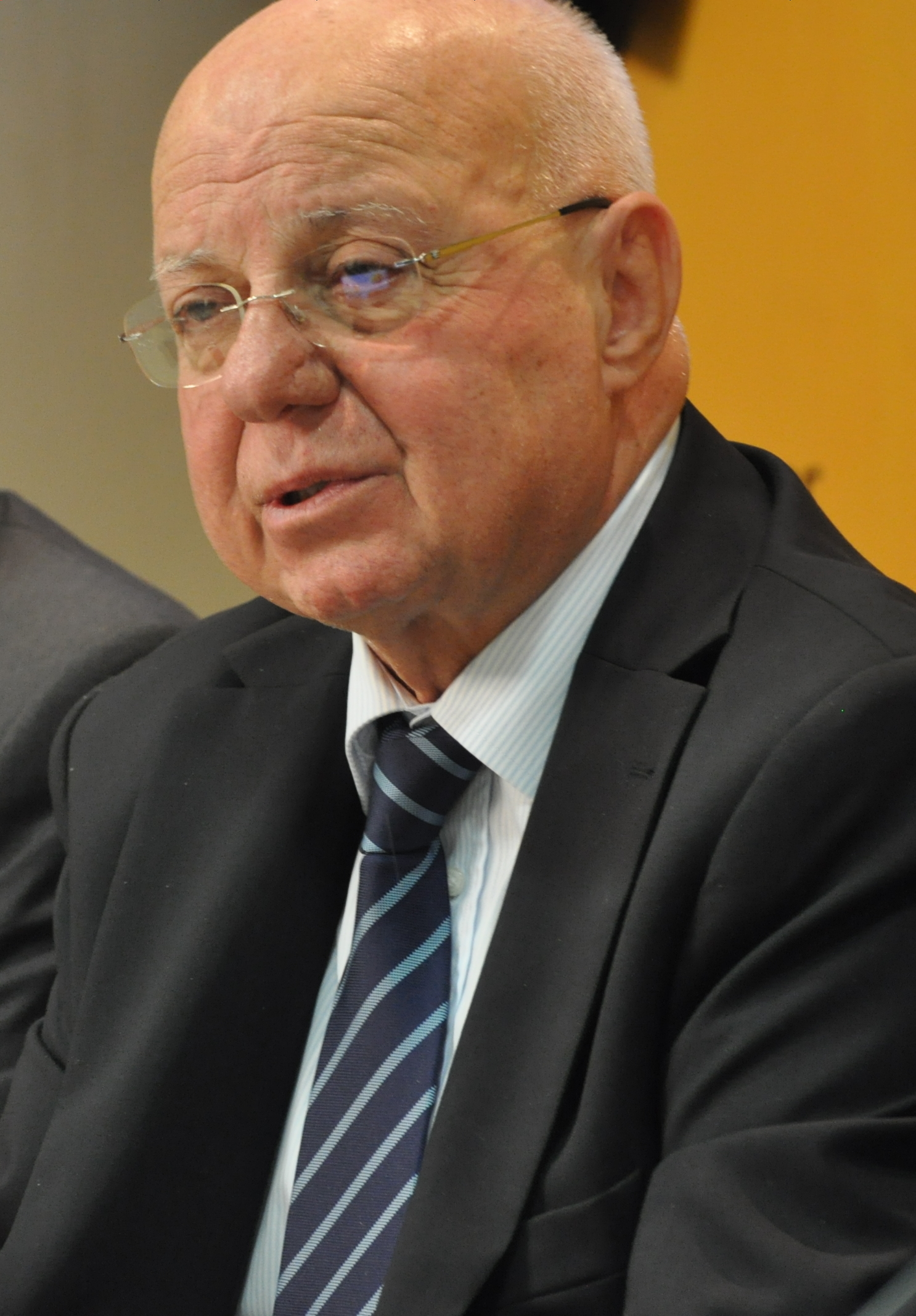
- Fila in 2015

Member of the National Assembly
- Incumbent
- Assumed office 3 August 2020
- President: Ivica Dačić; Vladimir Orlić

Member of the City Assembly of Belgrade
- In office 9 May 2018 – 7 June 2018
- President: Nikola Nikodijević

Personal details
- Born: 29 July 1941 (age 85) Bitolj, Bulgarian-occupied Yugoslavia (modern North Macedonia)
- Party: SPS (2017–present)
- Education: University of Belgrade
- Occupation: Lawyer, politician

Toma Fila (Serbian Cyrillic: Тома Фила; born 29 July 1941) is a Serbian lawyer and politician serving as a member of the National Assembly since 3 August 2020. He is also a member of the presidency of the Socialist Party of Serbia (SPS) and a member of the Diocesan Council of the Archbishopric of Belgrade and Karlovci.

== Early life and education ==
Fila was born on 29 July 1941 in Bitola, territory of the Kingdom of Yugoslavia, then occupied by Bulgaria (modern North Macedonia). His father was an ethnic Aromanian lawyer Filota Fila and his mother Eli was the daughter of a merchant from Belgrade. After the Bulgarian occupation authorities expelled them from Bitola, his father's hometown, they had to move to Nazi-occupied Serbia. Toma spent the war years with his mother in Negotin, while his father worked in Belgrade and in 1943 he was arrested for being a Yugoslav Partisan member, for which he was detained in the Banjica concentration camp and then taken to the Mauthausen-Gusen concentration camp.

He finished elementary and high school in Belgrade and in 1963 graduated from the Faculty of Law at the University of Belgrade.

== Law career ==
Following his graduation, he became the youngest lawyer in Yugoslavia and continued to work in his father's law office. Fila and his father were against the death penalty and often defended the accused for the most serious crimes. He served as the president of the Serbian Bar Association from 1990 to 1994. He was twice the president of the Federation of the Yugoslav Bar Association. Throughout his career, he defended Jovanka Broz, Slobodan Milošević, Žarko Laušević, Goran Hadžić and others.

== Political career ==
His political career started in 2008 when he was named legal advisor of Ivica Dačić, at that time the deputy prime minister of Serbia and the minister of internal affairs. In 2017, he joined SPS and, one year later, he was elected to the City Assembly of Belgrade following the 2018 local elections. Shortly after, on 7 June, he resigned as a member of the City Assembly. He currently serves as the member of the presidency of the Socialist Party of Serbia.

Following the 2020 Serbian parliamentary election, Fila was elected member of the National Assembly. In February 2022, Fila was named the ballot carrier and SPS's candidate for Mayor of Belgrade at the upcoming Belgrade City Assembly election.
