= United Serbia (2026 coalition) =

Political coalition in Serbia

Aleksandar Vučić – United Serbia Александар Вучић – Уједињена Србија
- Abbreviation: AV–US
- President: Miloš Vučević
- Parliamentary group leader: Aleksandar Vučić
- Deputy leader: Milenko Jovanov
- Founder: Tomislav Nikolić
- Founded: March 2012
- Ideology: Populism
- Political position: Big tent
- National Assembly: 102 / 250
- Assembly of Vojvodina: 62 / 120
- City Assembly of Belgrade: 57 / 110

Website
- srbijanesmedastane.org.rs

Aleksandar Vučić – United Serbia (Note: Serbian: Александар Вучић – Уједињена Србија, romanized: Aleksandar Vučić – Ujedinjena Srbija) (AV–US), commonly shortened to United Serbia, is an electoral list and political coalition led by the Serbian Progressive Party (SNS), which contested the 2026 Serbian parliamentary election. Its parliamentary group in the 14th National Assembly, dissolved in September 2026, was named "Aleksandar Vučić – Serbia Must Not Stop". In the 2026 election, the list lost to the Student List, winning 1,731,323 votes (39.48% of the valid votes) and 103 seats, 26 fewer than in 2023, and Aleksandar Vučić, its candidate for prime minister, conceded defeat on election night. In the 15th National Assembly, 102 of its 103 deputies form the opposition "Aleksandar Vučić – Serbia Is Winning" parliamentary group, led by Vučić.

SNS gained parliamentary status in 2008, when a group of MPs who had left the Serbian Radical Party formed the "Forward, Serbia" parliamentary group, which was renamed "Serbian Progressive Party" after the party was registered. It cooperated with the Democratic Party of Serbia (DSS) and New Serbia (NS) from its formation until 2010, when SNS formed a coalition with NS and two other parties, the Movement of Socialists (PS) and the Strength of Serbia Movement (PSS). The coalition was formalised for the 2012 parliamentary election under the "Let's Get Serbia Moving" banner, winning 73 seats, and formed a government with the Socialist Party of Serbia (SPS) and United Regions of Serbia (URS).

Tomislav Nikolić, then president of Serbia, called snap parliamentary elections for March 2014. SNS formed the "Future We Believe In" list, which also included the Serbian Renewal Movement (SPO) and the Christian Democratic Party of Serbia (DHSS), and won 158 seats. After the election, Aleksandar Vučić, the president of SNS, was appointed prime minister, succeeding Ivica Dačić. Vučić called snap elections in early 2016, after which the Party of United Pensioners of Serbia (PUPS) and the Serbian People's Party (SNP) joined the coalition; running under the "Serbia is Winning" banner, it won 131 seats. The "For Our Children" coalition won a supermajority of seats in the 2020 parliamentary election, and its convocation lasted until February 2022. The coalition contested the 2022 general election as "Together We Can Do Everything", the 2023 parliamentary election as "Aleksandar Vučić – Serbia Must Not Stop", and the 2026 election as "Aleksandar Vučić – United Serbia".

The coalition has also governed Belgrade since 2014 and Vojvodina since 2016. Vučić was President of Serbia from 2017 to 2026.

== History ==
=== Name ===
- 2012 election: Let's Get Serbia Moving – Tomislav Nikolić (Покренимо Србију – Томислав Николић, Pokrenimo Srbiju – Tomislav Nikolić)
- 2014 election: Aleksandar Vučić – Future We Believe In (Александар Вучић – Будућност у коју верујемо, Aleksandar Vučić – Budućnost u koju verujemo)
- 2016 election: Aleksandar Vučić – Serbia Is Winning (Александар Вучић – Србија побеђује, Aleksandar Vučić – Srbija pobeđuje)
- 2018 Belgrade election: Aleksandar Vučić – Because We Love Belgrade (Александар Вучић – Зато што волимо Београд, Aleksandar Vučić – Zato što volimo Beograd)
- 2020 election: Aleksandar Vučić – For Our Children (Александар Вучић – За нашу децу, Aleksandar Vučić – Za našu decu)
- 2022 election: Aleksandar Vučić – Together We Can Do Everything (Александар Вучић – Заједно можемо све, Aleksandar Vučić – Zajedno možemo sve)
- 2023 election: Aleksandar Vučić – Serbia Must Not Stop (Александар Вучић – Србија не сме да стане, Aleksandar Vučić – Srbija ne sme da stane)
- 2024 Belgrade election: Aleksandar Vučić – Belgrade Tomorrow (Александар Вучић – Београд сутра, Aleksandar Vučić – Beograd sutra)
- 2026 election: Aleksandar Vučić – United Serbia (Александар Вучић – Уједињена Србија, Aleksandar Vučić – Ujedinjena Srbija)

=== Foundation and early history ===
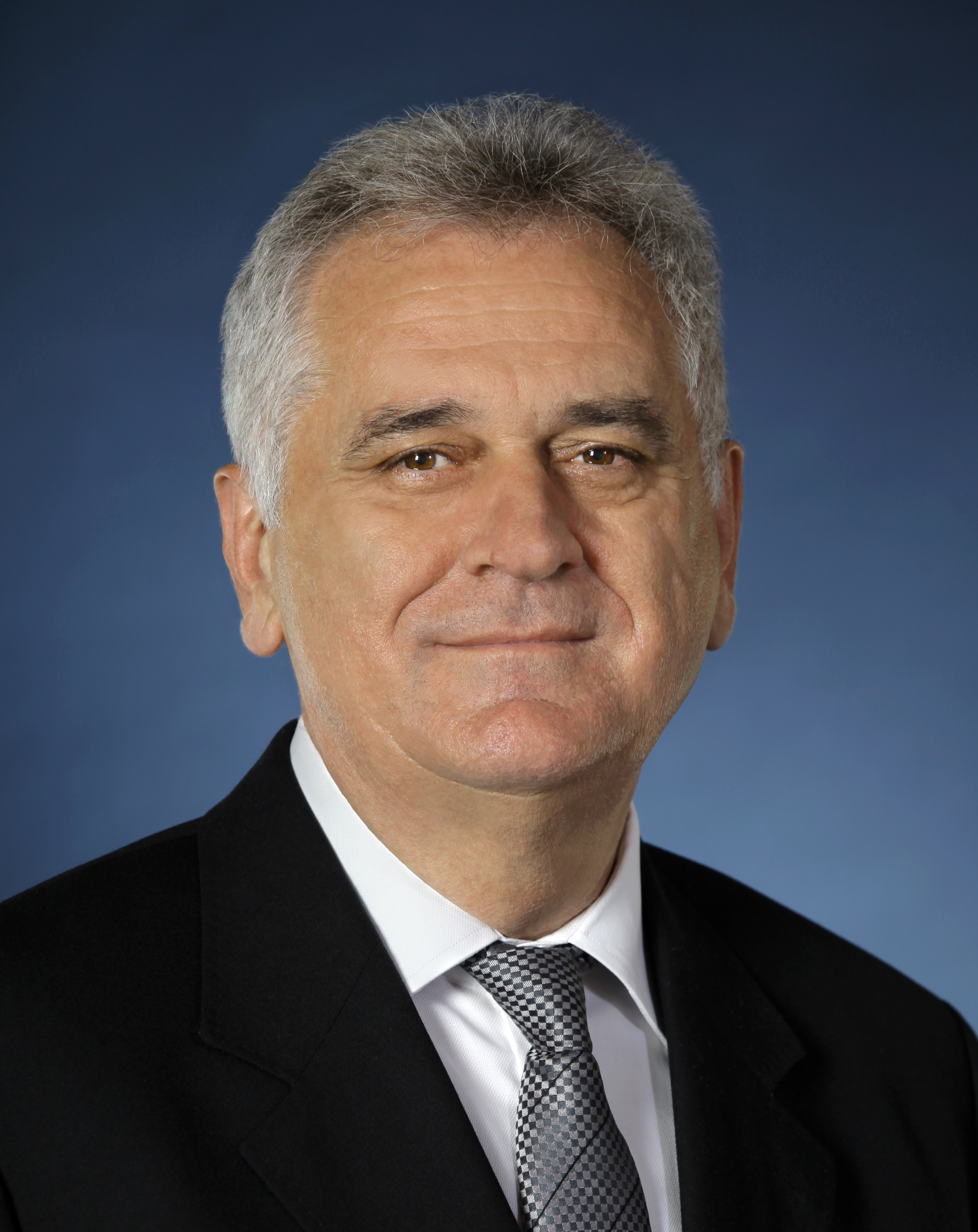
Tomislav Nikolić, founder of SNS

The Serbian Progressive Party (SNS) gained its parliamentary group status as a faction inside the far-right Serbian Radical Party (SRS) in September 2008, and a month later, SNS was officially formalised as a party, initially holding 21 MPs. At its foundation, SNS expressed support for the creation of a conservative political coalition with the Democratic Party of Serbia (DSS) and New Serbia (NS). This idea was realised at the local level after the 2009 local elections in Zemun, and later that year in Voždovac. A year later, Tomislav Nikolić stated that their cooperation would be extended. DSS rejected the formation of a coalition for the upcoming elections, which led to the signing of a cooperation agreement in November 2010 between SNS, NS, and two other parties, the Movement of Socialists (PS) and the Strength of Serbia Movement (PSS). Its first rally was held in February 2011, after which the coalition began organising mass protests in Belgrade. During the protests, Nikolić demanded early elections. The protests continued until April 2011.

The coalition was formalised in March 2012 under the name "Let's Get Serbia Moving" (Покренимо Србију, Pokrenimo Srbiju), and also included the Bosniak People's Party (BNS), the Democratic Party of Macedonians (DPM), the People's Peasant Party (NSS), the Roma Party (RP), and minor organisations. The name was also one of its slogans during the 2012 elections and the name of its electoral list in the 2012 parliamentary election. The coalition named the improvement of the economy and the fight against crime and corruption among its main goals, while its representative, Nikolić, was described as a nationalist. Despite predictions of a victory for Boris Tadić, Nikolić won the presidential election, while in the parliamentary election, the "Let's Get Serbia Moving" list won 73 seats in the National Assembly. It did not place first in the Vojvodina election, where it won 22 seats. Shortly after the election, Nikolić stepped down as president of SNS, and Aleksandar Vučić succeeded him. Nikolić gave the mandate to Ivica Dačić, the leader of the Socialist Party of Serbia (SPS), which had previously been part of the government led by the Democratic Party (DS), to form a government with SNS and the United Regions of Serbia (URS). The government was formed in July 2012. Veroljub Arsić was appointed head of the SNS parliamentary group, while Zoran Babić served as deputy head until August 2013, when they switched places.

The coalition was extended in late 2013, when the Serbian Renewal Movement (SPO) signed a cooperation agreement with SNS, a few months after cutting ties with DS. During the 2012–2014 convocation, SPO formed a parliamentary group with the Christian Democratic Party of Serbia (DHSS).

=== 2014 elections ===
The SNS–SPS government led by Dačić was reshuffled in July 2013 due to disagreements between the governing parties. Dačić also threatened that his party would leave the government if SNS did not accept the reshuffle, which led to speculation about snap elections. During Dačić's government, Vučić's popularity grew significantly, and in January 2014, he proposed calling snap parliamentary elections; Dačić's party accepted, and President Nikolić called the election for March 2014. This time, the SNS-led coalition ran under the "Future We Believe In" (Будућност у коју верујемо, Budućnost u koju verujemo) banner, with Vučić as its candidate for prime minister. The list also included SPO, DHSS, and the Social Democratic Party of Serbia (SDPS), which had not been on the SNS list in 2012.

The coalition won 158 seats in total, more than the number needed for a majority. In the City Assembly election held in Belgrade at the same time, it also won a majority of seats. Shortly after the election, SNS and SPS decided to continue their cooperation, and Vučić was appointed prime minister in April 2014, while in Belgrade, Siniša Mali, an independent nominated by SNS, was elected mayor. Between 2014 and 2016, the Serbian Progressive Party parliamentary group was composed of SNS, PSS, and NSS representatives.

=== 2016 elections ===
In January 2016, Vučić proposed calling snap elections, claiming that "Serbia needs more stability in order to join the European Union". Shortly after, the Party of United Pensioners of Serbia (PUPS), which had been a member of the SPS-led coalition, joined the SNS-led coalition, as did the Serbian People's Party (SNP) and the Independent Democratic Party of Serbia (SDSS). This time, the SNS-led coalition ran under the "Serbia Is Winning" (Србија побеђује, Srbija pobeđuje) banner, again with Vučić as its ballot carrier. DHSS and BNS were not on the list, although the minor Serb Democratic Party (SDS) ran with the SNS-led coalition in Vojvodina.

At the national level, the "Serbia Is Winning" coalition won 131 seats, while in the Vojvodina election, it placed first with 63 seats. Vučić continued his mandate, and SNS extended its cooperation with SPS. Between 2016 and 2020, the Serbian Progressive Party parliamentary group was composed of SNS, SPO, SNP, and PSS representatives. Aleksandar Martinović succeeded Babić as head of the parliamentary group following the election. In early 2017, Velimir Ilić, the leader of NS, announced that his party was leaving the SNS-led coalition. Vučić was elected president in the April 2017 election, and he then appointed Ana Brnabić to replace him as prime minister.

=== 2018–2020 elections ===
Logo of the For Our Children parliamentary group (2020–2022)

The SNS-led coalition also took part in the 2018 Belgrade City Assembly election, under the "Because We Love Belgrade" (Зато што волимо Београд, Zato što volimo Beograd) banner, with Zoran Radojičić as its mayoral candidate. The "Because We Love Belgrade" list won 64 seats, and in June 2018, Radojičić was sworn in as mayor and Goran Vesić as deputy mayor.

In the 2020 parliamentary election, the SNS-led coalition ran under the "For Our Children" (За нашу децу, Za našu decu) banner, with Branislav Nedimović first on the list. The United Peasant Party (USS), led by Milija Miletić, took part on the "For Our Children" list. The list won a supermajority of 188 seats, while in the Vojvodina election, it won 76 seats. Following the election, the parliamentary group changed its name from "Serbian Progressive Party" to "For Our Children", and between 2020 and 2022 it was composed of SNS, SPO, SNP, PSS, PS, and NSS representatives. In May 2021, the Serbian Patriotic Alliance (SPAS) merged into SNS, and its 10 MPs joined the "For Our Children" parliamentary group in early June.

=== 2022 elections ===
In February 2022, Brnabić announced that Vučić would be the coalition's candidate in the presidential election, while Danica Grujičić would be first on the parliamentary list. Its mayoral candidate for the Belgrade City Assembly was Aleksandar Šapić, the former president of SPAS. The SNS-led coalition ran under the "Together We Can Do Everything" (Заједно можемо све, Zajedno možemo sve) banner. Shortly after, Better Serbia (BS) joined the coalition. The list was submitted on 16 February, and proclaimed by RIK a day later. Vučić won 58% of the popular vote in the first round of the presidential election, while the "Together We Can Do Everything" list lost 68 seats compared with the 2020 parliamentary election.

=== 2023 elections ===
Logo for the 2023 elections

In the 2023 Serbian parliamentary election, the SNS-led coalition ran under the "Aleksandar Vučić – Serbia Must Not Stop" banner and won 129 seats. Its list also included candidates from Healthy Serbia, Radoslav Milojičić of the Serbian Left, Dejan Bulatović of the Alliance of Social Democrats, and Tatjana Macura, formerly of the Party of Modern Serbia.

=== 2026 elections ===
In June 2026, Vučić announced that he would resign as president and lead the SNS campaign in the next parliamentary election. On 5 September 2026, the SNS Main Board unanimously named Vučić as the list's candidate for prime minister and decided that the coalition would run as "Aleksandar Vučić – United Serbia". On 9 September, Vučić dissolved the National Assembly and called snap parliamentary elections for 25 October. The Republic Electoral Commission (RIK) proclaimed the list on 13 September, with 209,130 valid signatures out of 224,557 submitted; it was first on the ballot.

Vučić headed the list as its ballot carrier while still serving as president. On 16 September, RIK rejected four complaints, including one arguing that the list should not have been proclaimed because it bore the name of the sitting president. Vučić resigned as president on 27 September, after returning from the United Nations General Assembly in New York. SNS opened its campaign in mid-September by placing a black container in Kragujevac, in which it showcased alleged violence by the student movement. At an SNS rally in Novi Sad on 16 October, Vučić spoke of an alleged threat of the secession of Vojvodina.

Besides SNS, the Serbian Radical Party, PUPS, the Serbian People's Party, the Workers' Party, the People's Peasant Party and the United Peasant Party ran on the list, as did the Bosniak-Serb Alliance and the Vlach National Party. The Serbian Party Oathkeepers gave their support to the list.

Several former partners did not join the list. The Socialist Party of Serbia (SPS) decided to run separately with its traditional partners, United Serbia (JS) and the Greens of Serbia, while stating that it wanted to continue cooperating with SNS after the election. The Social Democratic Party of Serbia, which had run on the SNS list since 2014, joined the SPS-led list "Factor of Stability", and the Strength of Serbia Movement ran with its own list.

United Serbia lost the election to the Student List. According to RIK's count of all 8,392 polling stations, published after voting was repeated at 53 polling stations on 1 November, it won 1,731,323 votes (39.48% of the valid votes) and 103 seats, 26 fewer than in 2023, while the Student List won 2,354,417 votes and 140 seats. Vučić conceded defeat on election night, saying that "on the basis of a stratified sample, it is clear that we have lost these elections", and said that SNS would "show them what opposition is".

The mandates of the list's 103 deputies, its first 103 candidates, were confirmed at the constitutive sitting of the 15th National Assembly on 17 November 2026. Its parliamentary group, renamed "Aleksandar Vučić – Serbia Is Winning", has 102 members and is led by Vučić, with Milenko Jovanov as his deputy; Marko Korać, elected on the SNS's proposal, did not join it. Besides SNS deputies, the group includes four members of the Serbian Radical Party (Aleksandar Šešelj, Vjerica Radeta, Marina Nedeljković and Dejan Marinković), three of PUPS (Stefan Krkobabić, Risto Kostov and Dragan M. Marković), and one each of the Bosniak-Serb Alliance (Samir Tandir), the People's Peasant Party (Marijan Rističević), the United Peasant Party (Milija Miletić) and the Workers' Party (Đorđo Đorđić). It also includes four independents: Stojan Radenović, Jovan Kolundžija, Branislav Lečić and Dejan Bulatović, the president of the Alliance of Social Democrats, an association of citizens. The group nominated Stojan Radenović, who chaired the sitting as the oldest deputy, for President of the National Assembly.

== List of presidents of the parliamentary group ==
Name	Term start	Term end
Tomislav Nikolić	8 September 2008	31 May 2012
Veroljub Arsić	31 May 2012	27 August 2013
Zoran Babić	27 August 2013	3 June 2016
Aleksandar Martinović	3 June 2016	1 August 2022
Milenko Jovanov	1 August 2022	9 September 2026
Aleksandar Vučić	17 November 2026	present

== Members ==
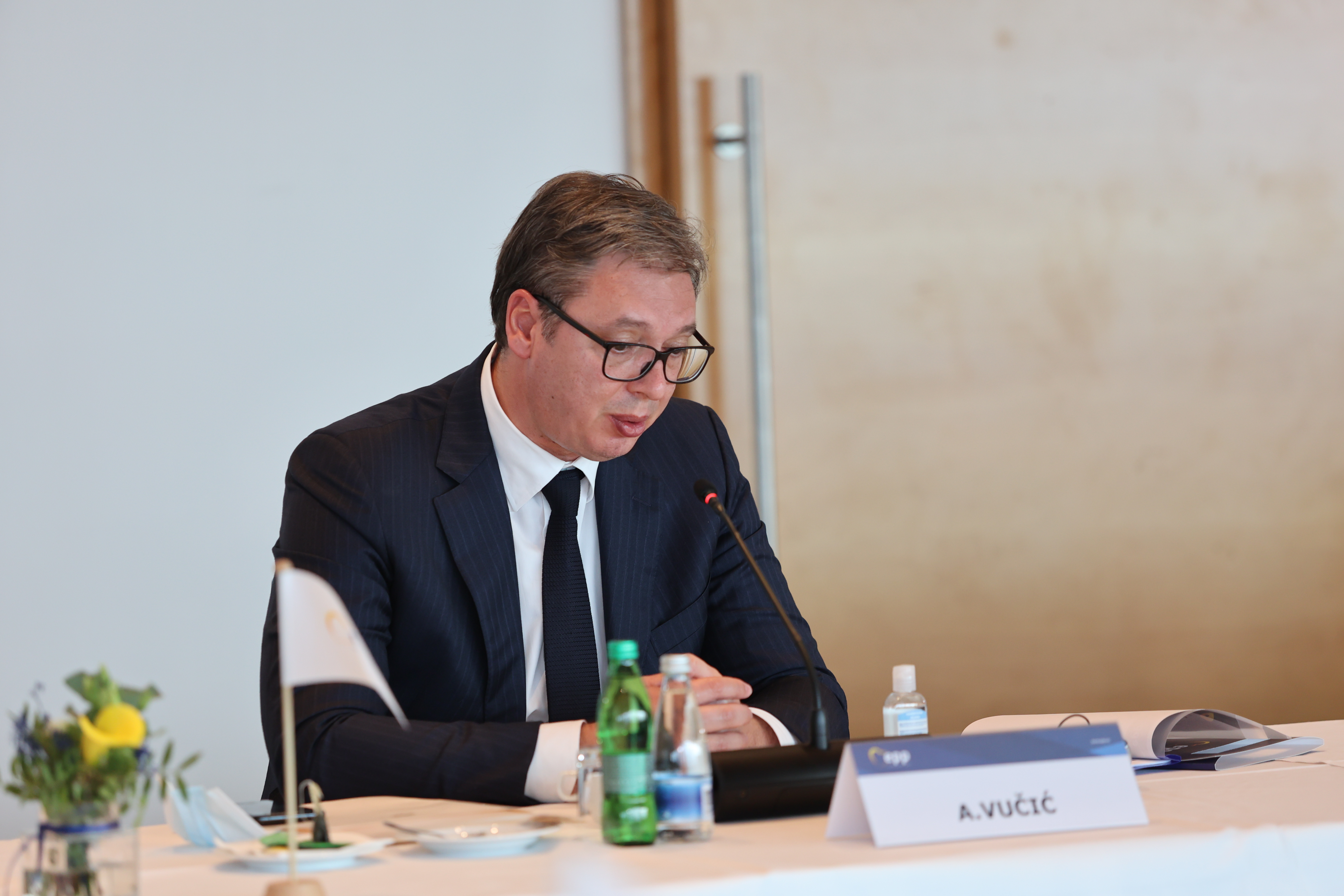
Aleksandar Vučić, president of SNS from 2012 to 2023

The following table lists the political parties that took part on the "Aleksandar Vučić – United Serbia" list in the 2026 Serbian parliamentary election, with the seats their members won. Healthy Serbia and the Movement of Socialists took part on the 2023 list; sources do not confirm their participation in 2026. Dejan Bulatović, the president of the Alliance of Social Democrats, was again a candidate on the list, as an independent.

Name	Leader(s)	Main ideology	Political position	Membership	National Assembly (2026 election)
Serbian Progressive Party (SNS)	Miloš Vučević	Populism	Big tent	2010–present	92 / 250 (Note: The Republic Electoral Commission does not publish candidates' party affiliations, and the National Assembly records all 103 deputies as elected on the proposal of the SNS. The SNS figure is the remainder after the partner parties' deputies and the four independents (Stojan Radenović, Jovan Kolundžija, Branislav Lečić and Dejan Bulatović), and may include other non-party candidates on the list; it includes Marko Korać, who is not a member of the parliamentary group.)
Serbian Radical Party (SRS)	Vojislav Šešelj	Ultranationalism	Far-right	2026–present	4 / 250
PUPS – Solidarity and Justice (PUPS)	Milan Krkobabić	Pensioners' interests	Single-issue	2016–present	3 / 250
Bosniak-Serb Alliance (BOSS); Бошњачко-српски савез Bošnjačko-srpski savez	Samir Tandir	Bosniak minority interests		2026–present	1 / 250
People's Peasant Party (NSS)	Marijan Rističević	Agrarianism	Right-wing	2012–present	1 / 250
United Peasant Party (USS)	Milija Miletić	Agrarianism	Centre-right	2014–present	1 / 250
Workers' Party (RP)	Željko Veselinović	Laborism	Centre-left	2026–present	1 / 250
Serbian People's Party (SNP)	Nenad Popović	National conservatism	Right-wing	2016–present	0 / 250
Vlach National Party (VNS); Влашка народна странка Vlaška narodna stranka	Predrag Balašević	Vlach minority interests		2026–present	0 / 250
Serbian Party Oathkeepers (SSZ)	Milica Đurđević Stamenkovski	Ultranationalism	Far-right	Support (2026)	0 / 250

=== Former members ===
Name		Leader	Founded	Ideology	Political position	Membership
Better Serbia; Боља Србија; Bolja Srbija	BS	Dragan Jovanović	2017	National conservatism Agrarianism	Right-wing	2022–2023
Healthy Serbia; Здрава Србија; Zdrava Srbija	ZS	Milan Stamatović	2017	National conservatism	Right-wing	2023–2026
Serbian Left; Српска левица Srpska levica	SL	Radoslav Milojičić	2022	Socialism	Left-wing	2023–2024
Bosniak People's Party; Бошњачка народна странка Bošnjačka narodna stranka	BNS	Mujo Muković	2012	Bosniak minority interests		2012–2016
Christian Democratic Party of Serbia; Демохришћанска странка Србије; Demohrišćanska stranka Srbije	DHSS	Olgica Batić	1997	Christian democracy	Centre	2014–2016
Democratic Party of Macedonians; Демократска партија Македонаца; Демократска партија на Македонци	DSM	Nenad Krsteski	2004	Macedonian minority interests		2012–2014
Social Democratic Party of Serbia; Социјалдемократска партија Србије; Socijaldemokratska partija Srbije	SDPS	Jug Radivojević	2009	Social democracy	Centre-left	2014–2026
Strength of Serbia Movement; Покрет снага Србије; Pokret snaga Srbije	PSS	Bogoljub Karić	2004	Conservatism	Centre-right	2010–2026
Serbian Renewal Movement; Српски покрет обнове Srpski pokret obnove	SPO	Aleksandar Cvetković	1990	Monarchism	Centre-right	2014–2025
Independent Democratic Party of Serbia; Самостална демократска странка Србије; Samostalna demokratska stranka Srbije	SDSS	Andreja Mladenović	2015	National conservatism	Centre-right	2016–2018
New Serbia; Нова Србија; Nova Srbija	NS	Velimir Ilić	1998	Conservatism; Right-wing populism	Right-wing	2010–2017
Roma Party; Ромска партија Romska partija	RP	Srđan Šajn	2003	Romani minority interests		2012–2014
Serb Democratic Party; Српска демократска странка Srpska demokratska stranka	SDS	Branislav Švonja	2011	Serbian nationalism	Right-wing	2012–2016

== Election results ==
=== Parliamentary elections ===
National Assembly of Serbia
Year	Leader		Popular vote	% of popular vote	#	# of seats	Seat change	Coalition	Status	Ref.
Year	Name	Party	Popular vote	% of popular vote	#	# of seats	Seat change	Coalition	Status	Ref.
2012	Tomislav Nikolić	SNS	940,659	25.16%	▲1st	73 / 250	▲52	Let's Get Serbia Moving	Government	
2014	Aleksandar Vučić	SNS	1,736,920	49.96%	1st	158 / 250	▲85	Future We Believe In	Government	
2016	Aleksandar Vučić	SNS	1,823,147	49.71%	1st	131 / 250	▼27	Serbia Is Winning	Government	
2020	Aleksandar Vučić	SNS	1,953,998	63.02%	1st	188 / 250	▲57	For Our Children	Government	
2022	Aleksandar Vučić	SNS	1,635,101	44.27%	1st	120 / 250	▼68	Together We Can Do Everything	Government	
2023	Aleksandar Vučić	SNS	1,783,701	48.07%	1st	129 / 250	▲9	Serbia Must Not Stop	Government	
2026	Aleksandar Vučić	SNS	1,731,323	39.48%	▼2nd	103 / 250	▼26	United Serbia	Opposition	

=== Provincial elections ===
Assembly of Vojvodina
Year	Leader		Popular vote	% of popular vote	#	# of seats	Seat change	Coalition	Status
Year	Name	Party	Popular vote	% of popular vote	#	# of seats	Seat change	Coalition	Status
2012	Igor Mirović	SNS	185,311	19.26%	▲2nd	22 / 120	▲22	Let's Get Vojvodina Moving	Opposition
2016	Igor Mirović	SNS	428,452	45.78%	▲1st	63 / 120	▲41	Serbia Is Winning	Government
2020	Igor Mirović	SNS	498,495	61.58%	1st	76 / 120	▲13	For Our Children	Government
2023	Damir Zobenica	SNS	452,850	48.94%	1st	66 / 120	▼10	Vojvodina Must Not Stop	Government

=== Belgrade City Assembly elections ===
City Assembly of Belgrade
Year	Leader		Popular vote	% of popular vote	#	# of seats	Seat change	Coalition	Status
Year	Name	Party	Popular vote	% of popular vote	#	# of seats	Seat change	Coalition	Status
2012	Aleksandar Vučić	SNS	219,198	26.83%	▲2nd	37 / 110	▲37	Let's Get Belgrade Moving	Opposition
2014	Siniša Mali	SNS	351,183	45.17%	▲1st	63 / 110	▲26	Future We Believe In	Government
2018	Zoran Radojičić	SNS	366,461	44.99%	1st	64 / 110	▲1	Because We Love Belgrade	Government
2022	Aleksandar Šapić	SNS	348,345	38.83%	1st	48 / 110	▼18	Together We Can Do Everything	Government
2023	Aleksandar Šapić	SNS	367,239	39.93%	1st	49 / 110	▲1	Belgrade Must Not Stop	Snap election
2024	Aleksandar Šapić	SNS	387,326	53.79%	1st	64 / 110	▲15	Belgrade Tomorrow	Government

=== Presidential elections ===
President of Serbia
Year	Candidate		1st round popular vote		% of popular vote	2nd round popular vote		% of popular vote	Ref.
Year	Name	Party	1st round popular vote		% of popular vote	2nd round popular vote		% of popular vote	Ref.
2012	Tomislav Nikolić	SNS	2nd	979,216	26.22%	1st	1,552,063	51.16%	
2017	Aleksandar Vučić	SNS	1st	2,012,788	56.01%	—N/a	—	—	
2022	Aleksandar Vučić	SNS	1st	2,224,914	60.01%	—N/a	—	—	
