= Tatjana Pašić =

Serbian politician

- Татјана Пашић
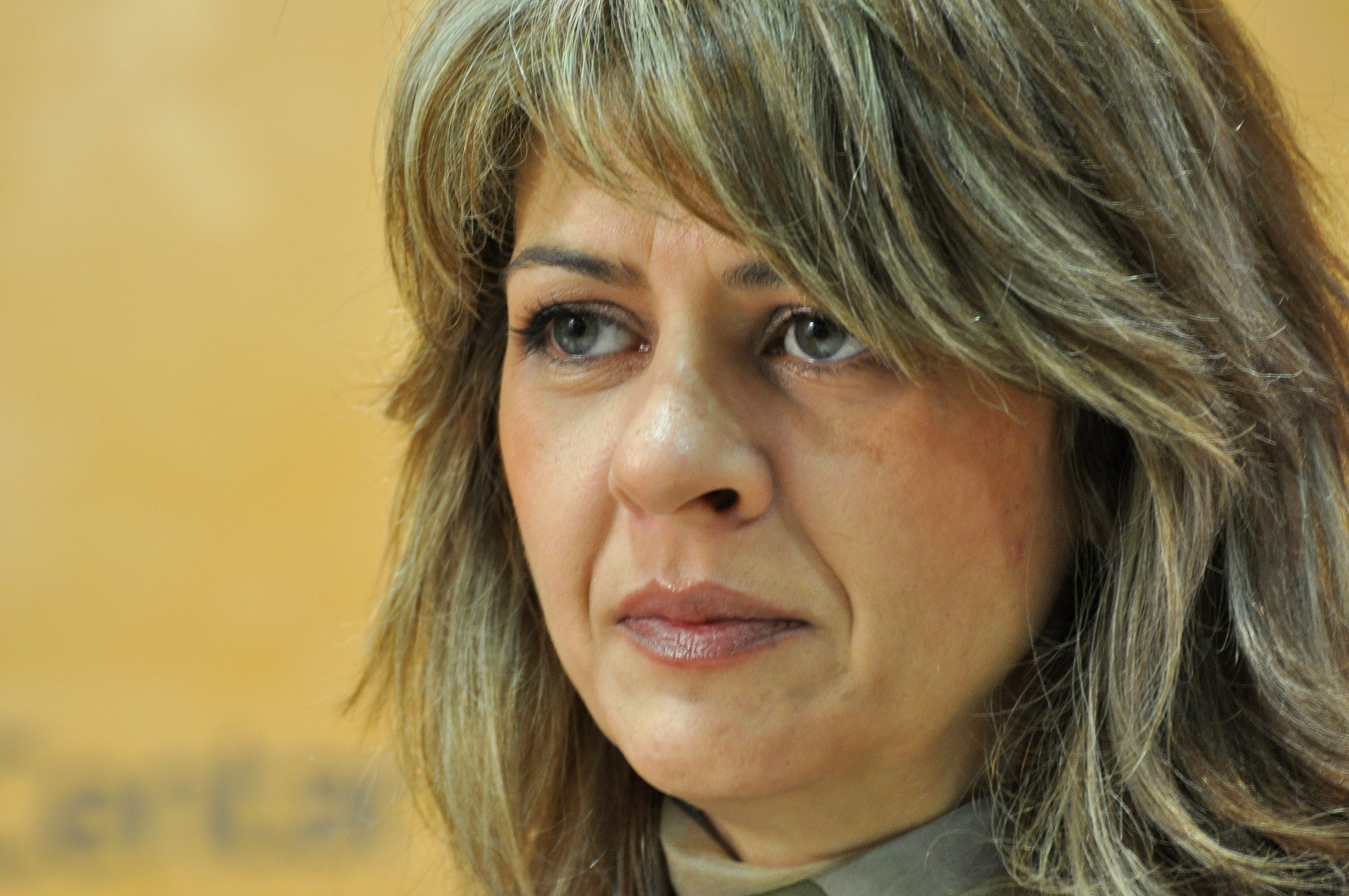
- Pašić in 2010

Member of the National Assembly of Serbia
- Incumbent
- Assumed office 1 August 2022
- President: Vladimir Orlić
- Constituency: Closed list

Member of the City Assembly of Belgrade
- In office 23 April 2014 – 11 June 2022
- President: Nikola Nikodijević
- Constituency: Closed list

Deputy Mayor of Belgrade
- In office 13 June 2012 – 24 September 2013
- Mayor: Dragan Đilas
- Preceded by: Milan Krkobabić
- Succeeded by: Andreja Mladenović (2014)

Personal details
- Born: 21 September 1964 (age 62) Belgrade, SR Serbia, SFR Yugoslavia
- Party: DS; SSP (2019–present)
- Other political affiliations: SzS (2019–2020); UOPS (2020–2021); UZPS (2021–2022); PE (2022–present)
- Education: University of Belgrade (LL.B.)
- Occupation: Politician
- Profession: Lawyer
- Other offices: 2007–2010: Director of the People's Office of the President; Nov–Dec 2013: Member of the Temporary Council of Belgrade

Tatjana Pašić (Serbian Cyrillic: Татјана Пашић, pronounced [tǎtjana pǎʃitɕ]; born 21 September 1964) is a Serbian politician who has been serving as a member of the National Assembly of Serbia since 2022. She is a member of the Party of Freedom and Justice (SSP), and was elected to the national assembly in the 2022 general election on the list of the United for the Victory of Serbia (UZPS), an alliance of parties in the opposition to Aleksandar Vučić.

== Early life ==
Pašić was born on 21 September 1964 in Belgrade, SR Serbia, SFR Yugoslavia. She earned a Bachelor of Laws from the Faculty of Law at the University of Belgrade, and finished the Diplomatic Academy of the Ministry of Foreign Affairs of Serbia.

== Career ==
Pašić worked as a journalist at the Radio B92, and then at the RTV Studio B. From 2004, she worked in the People's Office of the President of the Republic Boris Tadić as an advisor to the director, and from 2007 to 2010, she was the director of the People's Office.

She became an assistant to the Mayor of Belgrade Dragan Đilas in 2010, and then his deputy after the 2012 City Assembly election, becoming a member of the City Council. Đilas was dismissed by the City Assembly in September 2013; consequently, Pašić and other members of the City Council were dismissed as well. The Temporary Council was established two months later, to run the city as a provisional body until the 2014 City Assembly election. Pašić was appointed as a member of the council, representing the Democratic Party (DS); she resigned from that position in December 2013, in protest at the decisions made by the majority of council members.

From 2014 to 2022, she served as a member of the City Assembly of Belgrade. She was a member and official of the Democratic Party. Upon its foundation, she joined the Party of Freedom and Justice, and is a member of its Presidency.

Pašić was a candidate on the United for the Victory of Serbia list in the 2022 general election. She was elected, and became a member of the 13th convocation of the National Assembly of Serbia on 1 August 2022; she currently sits with the Ujedinjeni parliamentary group. In October 2022, she became a representative in the Parliamentary Assembly of the Council of Europe and she currently sits with the Socialists, Democrats and Greens Group.

Civic offices
Preceded by Dragan Đilas	Director of the People's Office of the President; 2007–2010	Succeeded by ?
Political offices
Preceded by Milan Krkobabić	Deputy Mayor of Belgrade; 2012–2013	Succeeded by Andreja Mladenović (2014)
City Assembly of Belgrade
Preceded by	Member of the City Assembly; 2014–2022	Succeeded by
National Assembly of the Republic of Serbia
Preceded by	Member of the National Assembly; 2022–present	Incumbent
