= Andreja Mladenović =

Serbian politician and administrator

- Андреја Младеновић
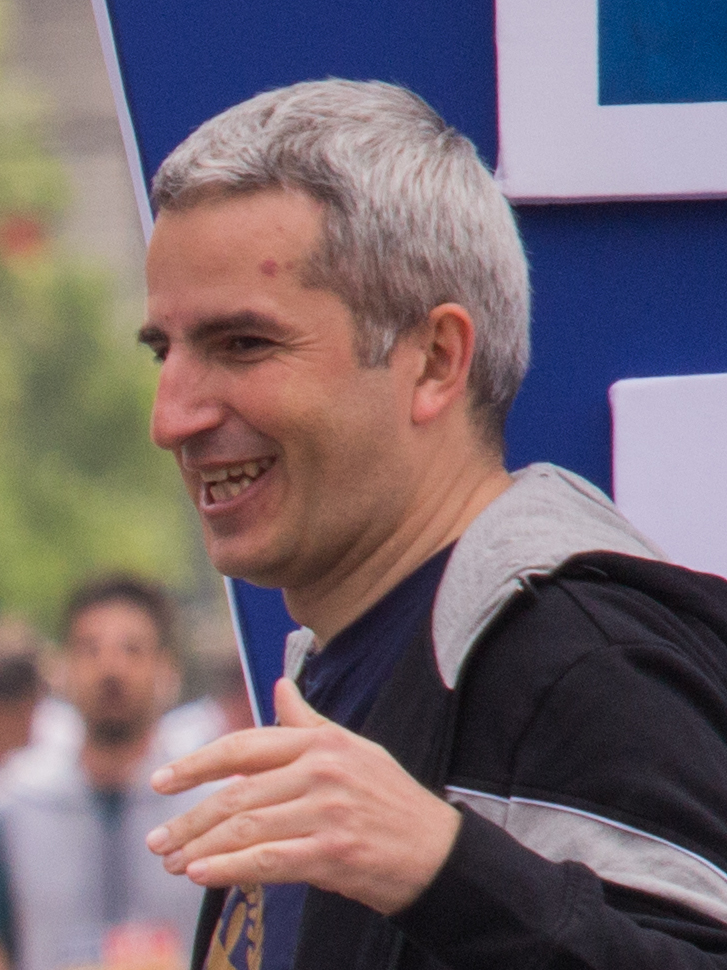

Director of the Belgrade Metro
- Incumbent
- Assumed office 18 August 2022
- Preceded by: Stanko Kantar

Leader of the Independent Serbian Party
- Incumbent
- Assumed office 19 February 2020
- Preceded by: position established

Leader of the Independent Democratic Party of Serbia
- In office 7 October 2015 – 19 February 2020
- Preceded by: position established
- Succeeded by: position eliminated

Acting Mayor of Belgrade
- In office 28 May 2018 – 7 June 2018
- Preceded by: Siniša Mali
- Succeeded by: Zoran Radojičić

Deputy Mayor of Belgrade
- In office 24 April 2014 – 7 June 2018
- Preceded by: vacant, previously Tatjana Pašić
- Succeeded by: Goran Vesić

Member of the Provisional Governing Council of Belgrade
- In office 18 November 2013 – 24 April 2014

Member of the City Council of Belgrade
- In office 26 November 2004 – 19 August 2008

Member of the National Assembly of the Republic of Serbia
- In office 3 June 2016 – 3 October 2016

Member of the City Assembly of Belgrade
- In office 11 June 2022 – 18 August 2022
- In office 9 May 2018 – 26 June 2018
- In office 23 April 2014 – 24 April 2014
- In office 26 November 2004 – 18 November 2013

Personal details
- Born: 15 March 1975 (age 51) Belgrade, SR Serbia, SFR Yugoslavia
- Party: DSS (1994–2015); Samostalni DSS (2015–20); Samostalna (since 2020)

Andreja Mladenović (Serbian Cyrillic: Андреја Младеновић; born 15 March 1975) is a Serbian politician and administrator. He was the deputy mayor of Belgrade from 2014 to 2018 and was an assistant to the mayor from 2018 to 2022. In August 2022, he was appointed as director of the Belgrade Metro.

A prominent member of the Democratic Party of Serbia (DSS) for many years, Mladenović was expelled from the party in 2015 and founded the Independent Democratic Party of Serbia (Samostalni DSS). Since 2020, he has been the leader of the Independent Serbian Party (Samostalna).

Since 2022, he has held the position of Acting Director of the Public Utility Company "Belgrade Metro and Train," which was established for the purpose of implementing and managing the metro system project in Belgrade.

== Early life and private career ==
Mladenović was born in Belgrade, in what was then the Socialist Republic of Serbia in the Socialist Federal Republic of Yugoslavia. He is a graduate of the University of Belgrade Faculty of Law, has a master's degree from the Faculty of International Engineering Management at the European University in Belgrade, and has enrolled in doctoral studies at the latter institution.

== Political career ==
=== Democratic Party of Serbia ===
==== City and municipal politics from 2000 to 2008 ====
Mladenović joined the Democratic Party of Serbia in 1994.

The DSS contested the 2000 Serbian local elections as part of the Democratic Opposition of Serbia (DOS), a broad and ideologically diverse coalition of parties opposed to Slobodan Milošević's government. The DOS won landslide victories in Belgrade and most of its constituent municipalities; in the election for the Zemun municipal assembly, it took sixty-one out of seventy seats.

Mladenović was one of the DOS delegates elected at the municipal level in Zemun. When the assembly convened in October 2000, he was chosen as its vice-president (i.e., deputy speaker, a position then equivalent to deputy mayor). For the next four years, he held administrative responsibility for sports and youth, refugees and social issues, and relations with religious communities.

Mladenović appeared in the second position on the DSS's electoral list for the City Assembly of Belgrade in the 2004 local elections and was elected when the list won thirteen mandates. The Democratic Party (DS) won the election and afterward formed a coalition government with the DSS and G17 Plus. Mladenović was appointed to city council (i.e., the executive branch of the city government) with responsibility for sports and youth, and served in this role for the next four years.

He also received the second position on the DSS's electoral list for Zemun in 2004 and was re-elected to the municipal assembly when the list won seven seats. The far-right Serbian Radical Party (SRS) won the election and formed a coalition government with the Strength of Serbia Movement (PSS), and the DSS served in opposition.

==== DSS spokesperson in the first Koštunica ministry ====
Mladenović appeared in the fifty-seventh position (out of 250) on the DSS's electoral list in the 2003 Serbian parliamentary election. The list won fifty-three mandates, and he was not included in the party's assembly delegation. (From 2000 to 2011, Serbian parliamentary mandates were awarded to sponsoring parties or coalitions rather than to individual candidates, and it was common practice for the mandates to be assigned out of numerical order. Mladenović could have been given a seat despite his comparatively low position on the list, but ultimately he was not.) The DSS became the dominant party in Serbia's coalition government after the election, and party leader Vojislav Koštunica became prime minister in 2004. Mladenović was appointed as the party's media spokesperson in the same year.

In early 2005, Mladenović said that Sreten Lukić would surrender voluntarily to the International Criminal Tribunal for the Former Yugoslavia (ICTY) in The Hague to face charges of war crimes. He added that the DSS supported the principle of voluntary surrender for ICTY indictees and opposed a policy of arrests. The following year, he criticized the European Union's pressure tactics on Serbia to surrender prominent war crimes suspects such as Radovan Karadžić and Ratko Mladić, both of whose whereabouts were unknown at the time. Mladenović said in June 2006, "What will [additional conditions on Serbia's bid for European Union membership] bring if Mladić is dead? What if he has left the country?" This notwithstanding, he later said that Serbia was co-operating with the ICTY in hunting for Mladić and other suspects. He rejected suggestions that Serbia's security forces needed to be "purged" in order to ensure the capture of prominent war criminals, saying, "a serious country would never allow anyone from outside to dictate the country's most important positions. That would mean that we are not a country, but a colony."

Serbia's national assembly observed a moment of silence for all victims of the 1990s Yugoslav Wars on 11 July 2005. Critics noted that the ceremony did not include specific reference to the victims of the 1995 Srebrenica massacre. Mladenović responded, "Serbia has an interest in exposing and condemning all war crimes in the history of the former Yugoslavia, in which the Serbian people were the biggest victims."

United Nations Special Envoy for Kosovo Martti Ahtisaari was quoted as saying in August 2006 that Serbs were culpable as a people for crimes committed in the Kosovo War. Mladenović described this statement as "scandalous, shameful, and racist." In February 2007, he supported the protests of Kosovo Serbs against Ahtisaari's plan for a final resolution of the status of Kosovo. The following month, he described a revised version of the Ahtisaari plan as "worse than the previous one," in that it fully corresponded "with the stance of the Albanian separatists."

==== DSS spokesperson in the second Koštunica ministry ====
The 2007 Serbian parliamentary election did not produce a clear winner, and the DS, DSS, and G17 Plus ultimately formed an unstable coalition government with Vojislav Koštunica continuing in the role of prime minister. Mladenović, who provided regular media updates during the negotiations for a new government, remained the DSS's media spokesperson, although from July 2007 he shared this responsibility with Branislav Ristivojević.

In September 2007, Mladenović said that Serbian Army forces would not be deployed to international missions in either Afghanistan or Iraq. In November, he said that a new European Union (EU) mission to Kosovo and Metohija would be unacceptable for Serbia before a multilateral settlement on the status of the territory.

The DSS offered to support DS incumbent Boris Tadić in the second round of the 2008 Serbian presidential election provided that Tadić agreed to abandon Serbia's Stabilization and Association Agreement with the European Union in the event of a new EU mission to Kosovo unsanctioned by the Serbian government. Tadić rejected the offer, and the DSS remained neutral in the runoff vote between Tadić and SRS candidate Tomislav Nikolić. Mladenović blamed Tadić and the DS for this situation, stressing that the DSS proposal was a legitimate offer and not a form of political blackmail. Tadić ultimately won a narrow victory in the runoff.

Kosovo's unilateral declaration of independence in February 2008 and the subsequent recognition of the Republic of Kosovo by many European Union countries created a crisis for the DSS–DS–G17 Plus government. Mladenović said that Serbia's "official policy thus far has been that Kosovo is Serbia and that we will join the EU with Kosovo as a constituent part," and he called for a referendum on whether the country was willing to continue on the European Union path "with or without Kosovo." The crisis ultimately led to the breakdown of the coalition government and to an early parliamentary election in May 2008. The DSS contested the election in a partnership with New Serbia (NS), and Mladenović received the sixty-second position on their combined list.

Boris Tadić announced during the 2008 parliamentary campaign that he would sign the Stabilization and Association Agreement with the EU. Mladenović responded, "his signature is not the signature of Serbia. He is in fact putting a seal of Judas on his party coalition to the [agreement]."

==== Politician and DSS spokesperson from 2008 to 2010 ====
The 2008 parliamentary election again failed to produce a clear winner. The DSS–NS alliance won thirty seats, and Mladenović said afterward that it would not negotiate with pro-EU parties for a new government. The DSS sought to form a new administration with the SRS and the Socialist Party of Serbia (SPS), and Mladenović again provided regular updates on negotiations between the parties. The talks ultimately failed, and the Socialists instead entered a coalition government with the For a European Serbia (ZES) alliance led by the DS. The DSS moved into opposition. Mladenović was not included in his party's delegation in the national assembly.

Mladenović was also given the thirteenth position on the DSS–NS list for Belgrade in the 2008 local elections, which were held concurrently with the parliamentary vote, and received a mandate for a new term after the list won twelve seats. In parallel with developments at the republic level, the DSS held talks with the Radicals and Socialists for a new government, and Mladenović indicated that the DSS was willing to endorse the SRS's Aleksandar Vučić for mayor. Mladenović, Vučić, and Milan Krkobabić (representing the Socialist alliance) announced an agreement for a new city government on 28 May 2008, and rumours circulated that Mladenović would become deputy mayor. The deal fell apart when the ZES and Socialists formed a coalition at the republic level, and a ZES–SPS alliance soon came to power in Belgrade as well. The DSS moved into opposition, and Mladenović led its group in the city assembly. His term on city council formally ended on 19 August 2008.

Mladenović also led the DSS–NS list for the Zemun municipal assembly in 2008. The list won five mandates, and on this occasion he did not take a seat.

In July 2008, Mladenović announced that the DSS would support a rally organized by the Radical Party against the recent arrest of Radovan Karadžić. The following month, he said that Russia's decision to recognize the independence of Abkhazia and South Ossetia in Georgia was a reaction to the recognition of Kosovo's independence by the western powers.

Mladenović announced a new co-operation agreement between the DSS, New Serbia, and Maja Gojković's People's Party (NP) in November 2008, saying that the parties would fight for "enduring democratic principles and national values." In June 2009, he said that the DSS was prepared to align itself with the recently established Serbian Progressive Party (SNS) to form new coalition governments in the Belgrade municipalities of Zemun and Voždovac. He appears to have stood down as a DSS media spokesperson in early 2010.

==== After 2010 ====
Serbia's electoral system was reformed in 2011, such that all mandates were awarded to candidates on successful lists in numerical order. Mladenović received the forty-fourth position on the DSS's electoral list in the 2012 Serbian parliamentary election and was not elected when the list won twenty-one mandates. He was also given the second position on the DSS's list in the concurrent 2012 Belgrade city election and was re-elected to the city assembly when the list won ten mandates.

The DS and Socialists initially maintained their coalition agreement in Belgrade after the 2012 election, and the DSS again served in opposition. In late 2013, the party participated in a key vote of non-confidence that forced the resignation of mayor Dragan Đilas. The Serbian government dissolved the Belgrade assembly in November 2013 pending new elections, and Mladenović was appointed as the DSS's representative on a multi-party interim governing council.

Mladenović received the second position on the DSS list in the 2014 city assembly election and was re-elected when the list won nine mandates. The Serbian Progressive Party (SNS) and its allies won a majority victory with sixty-three seats out of 110 and afterward formed a new coalition government that included the DSS. Mladenović was appointed as Belgrade's deputy mayor in April 2014. By virtue of holding this position, he was required to resign from the city assembly.

Mladenović also received the tenth position on the DSS's list in the 2014 Serbian parliamentary election, which was once again held concurrently with the Belgrade vote. The party failed to cross the electoral threshold for assembly representation.

=== Independent Democratic Party of Serbia ===
DSS leader Sanda Rašković Ivić expelled Mladenović and six members of the party's Belgrade assembly delegation in July 2015, on the grounds that they were trying to turn the DSS into a satellite of the Progressive Party. Mladenović subsequently formed the Independent Democratic Party of Serbia and created alliances with the SNS at the republic and city levels.

Mladenović was given the tenth position on the Progressive Party's coalition list in the 2016 parliamentary election and was elected when the list won a majority victory with 131 out of 250 mandates. He was his party's only representative in the national assembly and appears to have been its only candidate on the SNS list. During his brief assembly term, he was a member of the committee on Kosovo and Metohija and a deputy member of the economy committee. (Note: Formally known as the Committee on the Economy, Regional Development, Trade, Tourism, and Energy.) He resigned his seat on 3 October 2016 as he could not hold a dual mandate as a national assembly member and deputy mayor of Belgrade.

Mladenović later received the eighth position on the Progressive Party's list in the 2018 Belgrade city election and was elected for a fifth term when SNS coalition won a second consecutive majority victory with sixty-four seats. He served as acting mayor of Belgrade from 28 May to 7 June 2018, following Siniša Mali's resignation to accept a cabinet position and before Zoran Radojičić was confirmed as his replacement. Mladenović's term as deputy mayor ended when Radojičić took office; he was re-assigned as an assistant to the mayor and served in this role for the next four years.

=== Independent Serbian Party ===
The Independent Democratic Party of Serbia merged with the Movement for the Development of Serbia and the National Democratic Political Council in February 2020 to form the Independent Serbian Party. Mladenović was chosen as the party's first president.

The SNS's coalition list for the 2022 Belgrade city assembly election included two candidates of the Independent Serbian Party; Mladenović appeared in the eighth position on the list and was re-elected when it won a plurality victory with forty-eight mandates. Following the election, the SNS formed a new coalition administration with Aleksandar Šapić as mayor.

Mladenović was appointed as director of the Belgrade Metro on 18 August 2022. By virtue of accepting this appointment, he resigned his seat in the city assembly on the same day. In August 2024, he represented the Belgrade Metro in signing a 20.5 million Euro deal with PowerChina.
