= 2022 Belgrade City Assembly election =

City Assembly election in Belgrade

- 3 April 2022
- All 110 seats in the City Assembly; 56 seats needed for a majority
- Turnout: 57.85% ▲6.55 pp
Party	Leader	Vote %	Seats	+/–
SNS coalition	Aleksandar Šapić	38.83	48	−28
UZPB	Vladeta Janković	21.78	26	0
Moramo	Dobrica Veselinović	11.04	13	+13
SPS–JS–ZS	Toma Fila	7.14	8	0
NADA	Vojislav Mihailović	6.44	7	+7
SSZ	Mladen Kočica	3.57	4	+4
Dveri–POKS	Radmila Vasić	3.44	4	+4
This lists parties that won seats. See the complete results below.
Results by municipality
Mayor before	Mayor after
Zoran Radojičić; Independent	Aleksandar Šapić; SNS

Local elections were held in Belgrade on 3 April 2022 to elect members of the City Assembly. Alongside the election, national-level general elections and local elections in 12 other towns and municipalities were held on the same day.

== Background ==
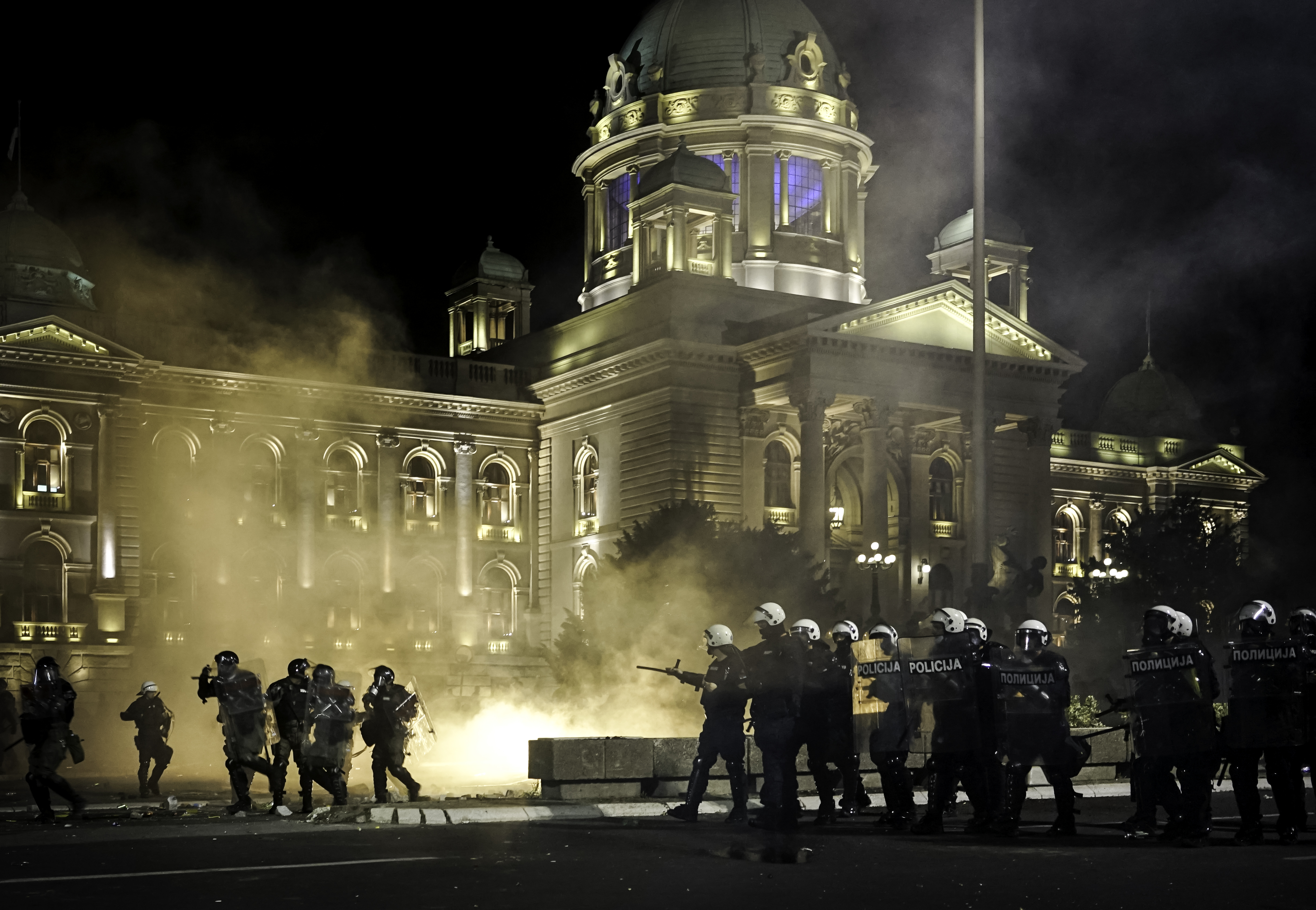
Protests outside the National Assembly building in July 2020

Following the vote of no confidence in 2013, Dragan Đilas was dismissed as mayor, and a temporary body was set up by the Serbian Progressive Party (SNS), who has ruled Belgrade since then. The current session of the City Assembly was elected in 2018, after SNS, Socialist Party of Serbia (SPS) and United Serbia (JS) formed a majority. Zoran Radojičić, an independent endorsed by SNS, was elected mayor, succeeding Siniša Mali, while Goran Vesić was elected deputy mayor. The 2018 election also marked the return of Đragan Đilas to politics, and his list ended up gaining 26 seats, while the list led by Aleksandar Šapić won 12 seats.

Later that year, the Alliance for Serbia (SzS) was formed by Đilas, along with Vuk Jeremić, Zoran Lutovac, and Boško Obradović. It was a major opposition alliance, that also played a key role in the 2018–2020 protests, and it boycotted the 2020 parliamentary election. Municipal elections were held in Belgrade after the parliamentary election, in which, SNS won a majority in all 16 Belgrade municipalities except New Belgrade, where the Serbian Patriotic Alliance (SPAS), which was led by Aleksandar Šapić, managed to form a local government, third time in a row. During that period, protests erupted in Belgrade over the announcement of the reimplementation of the curfew and government's allegedly poor handling of the COVID-19 pandemic. The demonstrators took to the streets, stormed the National Assembly building, and clashed with the police. The clashes and riots continued for the next few days, while the police used excessive force.

In May 2021, Šapić merged his party into SNS, after which he was promoted to vice president of the party. A series of environmental protests have been held in Belgrade as early as January 2021, although since September 2021, the protests have garnered greater attention, which led to roadblocks on the Gazela Bridge in November and December 2021.

== Electoral system ==
Local elections in Belgrade are held under a proportional representation system. Voters in Belgrade will determine the composition of the City Assembly, which in turn elects the mayor. Shortly prior the election, parties must submit a ballot list and their ballot leader. One mandate of a mayor and an elected member of the City Assembly lasts four years.

On 15 February 2022, Ivica Dačić, the president of the National Assembly, called the local elections.

=== Political parties ===
The table below lists political parties represented in the City Assembly of Belgrade after the 2018 election.

Name	Ideology	Political position	Leader	2018 result	
Name	Ideology	Political position	Leader	Votes (%)	Seats
SNS–led coalition	Populism	Big tent	Zoran Radojičić	44.99%	64 / 110
Dragan Đilas list	Anti-corruption	Centre	Dragan Đilas	18.93%	26 / 110
Aleksandar Šapić – Mayor	National conservatism	Right-wing	Aleksandar Šapić	9.01%	12 / 110
SPS–JS	Populism	Centre-left	Aleksandar Antić	6.13%	8 / 110

=== Pre-election composition ===
Party	Seats
Serbian Progressive Party	76
Party of Freedom and Justice	13
SPS–JS	8
Civic Democratic Forum	6
People's Party	5
Movement of Free Citizens	2

== Electoral lists ==
The following are the official electoral lists published by the Belgrade City Electoral Commission (GIK).

#	Ballot name	Ballot carrier	Main ideology	Political position
1	Aleksandar Vučić — Together We Can Do Everything; SNS, SDPS, PS, PUPS, PSS–BK, SNP, SPO, VMSZ, Samostalna	Aleksandar Šapić	Populism	Big tent
2	Ivica Dačić — Prime Minister of Serbia, Toma Fila — Mayor of Belgrade; SPS, JS, ZS	Toma Fila	Populism	Big tent
3	Dr Vojislav Šešelj — Serbian Radical Party; SRS	Miljko Ristić	Ultranationalism	Far-right
4	Milica Đurđević Stamenkovski — Serbian Party Oathkeepers; SSZ	Mladen Kočica	Ultranationalism	Far-right
5	Vladeta Janković — United for the Victory of Belgrade; SSP, NS, DS, PSG, PZP, VMDK, USS Sloga, SMS, VS, PSS	Vladeta Janković	Anti-corruption	Big tent
6	Dr Miloš Jovanović — NADA for Serbia — Serbian Coalition NADA — National Democratic Alternative — Democratic Party of Serbia — For the Kingdom of Serbia — Vojislav Mihailović; DSS, ZKS, (Note: Due to a dispute between Vojislav Mihailović and Žika Gojković, Mihailović had to register under the "For Kingdom of Serbia" organization because Gojković still legally represents the leadership of POKS) BGS	Vojislav Mihailović	National conservatism	Right-wing
7	We Must – For a Better City – Do not let Belgrade drown – Action – Ecological Uprising – Ćuta – Choice for Our Municipality – Solidarity Platform – Forum of Romani People of Serbia – Dobrica Veselinović; NDB, ZZS, EU, IZNO, Solidarity, FRS	Dobrica Veselinović	Green politics	Centre-left to left-wing
8	Duško Vujošević — Boris Tadić — Come on People — Social Democratic Party — New Party — 1 of 5 million — Tolerance of Serbia — United Green Movement of Serbia — Bosniak Civic Party — Party of Montenegrins; SDS, Nova, #1od5m, TS, UPZS, BGS, SC	Duško Vujošević	Social liberalism	Centre to centre-left
9	Nemanja Šarović — For the Whole Normal World; LJVN	Nemanja Šarović	National conservatism	Right-wing
10	Sovereignists — Saša Radulović — Milan Stamatović — dr Jovana Stojković; DJB, ZS, ŽZS	Vojin Biljić	Right-wing populism	Right-wing
11	Boško Obradović — Serbian Movement Dveri — POKS — Miloš Parandilović — Patriotic Bloc for the Restoration of the Kingdom of Serbia; Dveri, POKS	Radmila Vasić	Serbian nationalism	Right-wing
12	Russian Minority Alliance for Belgrade — Aleksandar Buhanac (Serbo-Russian Movement, Serbo-Russian Party Wolves, Movement of Greeks Srbiza); SRP, (Note: The Serbo-Russian Movement is made up of the Leviathan Movement, two political parties and ten organizations.) SRPV, PGS	Pavle Bihali	Neo-fascism	Far-right

== Campaign ==
=== Slogans ===
Party/coalition	Original slogan	English translation	Source
United Serbia	Beograd te zove	Belgrade is calling you	
We Must	Za dobar grad!	For a good city!	
Dveri–POKS	Srcem za Beograd	For Belgrade with heart	

=== Party campaigns ===
==== Serbian Progressive Party ====
In January 2022, the Serbian Progressive Party chose Aleksandar Šapić as their candidate for mayor, and GIK confirmed their ballot list on 17 February.

== Opinion polls ==
Polling organization	Date published	SNS—led coalition	SPAS	SPS—JS	United Serbia				Moramo	Dveri	DJB	NADA	SSZ	Others	Lead
Polling organization	Date published	SNS—led coalition	SPAS	SPS—JS	PSG	SSP	NS	DS	Moramo	Dveri	DJB	NADA	SSZ	Others	Lead
Results	3 April	38.83		7.14	21.78				11.04	3.44	2.18	6.44	3.57	5.57	17.05
ŠSM	28 Mar 2022	45.8		4.6	29.0				9.6	2.0	2.2	3.5	1.6	1.7	16.8
Nova S	14 Mar 2022	38.9		3.2	16.4				17.2	–	–	2.9	2.5	3.7 (Note: Without 8.3% undecided and 6.9% refused to answer)	21.7
NSPM	11 Mar 2022	41.8		8.2	21.6				10.0	2.2	2.7	3.6	3.4	6.5	20.2
Elections called, beginning of official campaigning
NSPM	11 Feb 2022	36.6		7.4	14.0				12.6	1.2	1.6	3.2	2.5	20.9 (Note: Including 14.9% for the opposition, but still undecided as to whom)	22
Stata.rs	11 Feb 2022	29.3			28.2				7.1	2.8	2.8	3.6	4.6	21.6 (Note: Including 13.7% undecided and 5.7% that would not vote)	1.1
ŠSM	10 Dec 2021	47.9			25.3				13.5	0.9	1.8	3.8	1.9	4.9	22
Demostat	2 Dec 2021	46.0			22.0				13.0	5.0	–	4.0	with Dveri	10.0	24
United Serbia coalition formed, escalation of the environmental protests
Faktor plus	31 Oct 2021	44.3		7.0	2.0	9.7	2.9	2.4	6.4	1.3	3.9	3.1	2.5	14.5	34.6
Demostat	26 Oct 2021	38.9		6.2	26.5				6.0	2.0	4.0	4.2	1.9	10.3	12.4
Demostat	17 Aug 2021	31.8			–	31.8 (Note: Includes all opposition parties that boycotted last parliamentary election)					–	–	–	36.4 (Note: Including 21.2 for the opposition, but still undecided as to whom and 15.1 for "constructive opposition".)	Tossup
Faktor plus	5 Aug 2021	45.1		7.1	–	10.0	4.0	–	6.5	–	4.3	–	–	23.0	35.1
ŠSM	18 Jul 2021	44.6		8.8	15.6		5.8	–	10.8	3		2.3	–	9.1	29
NSPM	3 June 2021	34.5	11.7	6.7	–	22.6 (Note: Includes all opposition parties that boycotted last parliamentary election)					–	–	–	24.5 (Note: Including 15.9 for the opposition, but still undecided as to whom, 7.1 for "constructive opposition")	11.9
SPAS merges with SNS
NSPM	20 June 2019	40.7	3.8	8.1	4.3	18.2 (Note: For later dissolved Alliance for Serbia (SzS))			1.9	(SzS)	–	1.0	–	28.5 (Note: Including 18.7 for the opposition, but still undecided as to whom.)	22.5
2018 election	4 Mar 2018	44.9	9.0	6.1	18.9			2.2	3.4	3.9		(Note: DSS: 1.1; POKS: 0.5)		20.9	26.0

=== Mayor preferences ===
Polling organization	Date of publishment	Šapić SNS	Janković US	Lead
Stata.rs	11 Feb 2022	44.5	49.4	4.9

== Results ==
The following results were published with 88.63% of polling stations reporting. Voting was repeated at three voting stations on 16 April and on two voting stations on 21 April. Final results were published on 9 May. SNS and SPS won the most votes in Suburban municipalities, such as Obrenovac, Barajevo and others, while UZPS and Moramo got a majority of their votes from central municipalities such as Vračar, Stari Grad and Savski Venac.

Party	Votes	%	+/–	Seats	+/–
Together We Can Do Everything	348,345	38.83	–6.16	48	–28
United for the Victory of Belgrade	195,335	21.78		26	0
We Must	99,078	11.04		13	+13
SPS–JS–ZS	64,050	7.14		8	0
National Democratic Alternative	57,760	6.44		7	+7
Serbian Party Oathkeepers	32,029	3.57		4	+4
Dveri–POKS	30,898	3.44		4	+4
SDS–Nova	26,219	2.92		0	0
Sovereignists	19,544	2.18		0	0
Serbian Radical Party	14,674	1.64		0	0
Nemanja Šarović — For the Whole Normal World	5,239	0.58		0	0
Russian Minority Alliance	3,879	0.43		0	0
Total	897,050	100.00	–	110	–
Valid votes	897,050	97.91			
Invalid/blank votes	19,155	2.09			
Total votes	916,205	100.00			
Registered voters/turnout	1,600,462	57.85			
Source: GIK

== Aftermath ==
Preliminary results were published a day after the elections. Opposition parties had managed to win more votes than the governing parties, although the opposition Social Democratic Party remained below the threshold. The We Must coalition called for a discussion between opposition parties, while the National Democratic Alternative and Dveri have stated that they would cooperate with other opposition parties to form a local government. Zoran Alimpić, the representative of the United for the Victory of Belgrade coalition, and the We Must coalition stated that irregularities occurred during the election day. The opposition held a press conference on 5 April.

Following the conference, Dragan Đilas and Marinika Tepić stated that "the shortest route would be to call early elections". Đilas later met with Aleksandar Vučić to discuss the outcome of the elections. The move was criticized by the People's Party and Serbian Party Oathkeepers, while Zoran Lutovac, president of the Democratic Party, said that Đilas did not consult with other coalition members before the meeting. Radomir Lazović, a representative of the We Must coalition, stated that "two people [Vučić and Đilas] should not decide on matters that are far beyond their competence". Dveri had stated their support for the formation of a minority government.

The Social Democratic Party failed to cross the threshold even after the repeated elections on 16 and 21 April; they have claimed that the votes were stolen in order for them to not cross the threshold. Opposition parties have stated that the next elections might be called earlier. Lutovac stated that he would prefer to create a wide alliance of moderate parties for the next election, while Pavle Grbović, the leader of the Movement of Free Citizens, stated that his party might leave the coalition in order to continue alone. On 20 June, Aleksandar Šapić was chosen as mayor of Belgrade.
