= President of the City Assembly of Belgrade =

Presiding officer of the City Assembly of Belgrade

- Председник Скупштине града Београда; Predsednik Skupštine grada Beograda
- Coat of arms of Belgrade
- Incumbent; Nikola Nikodijević since 23 April 2014
- Style: President
- Residence: No official residence
- Seat: Old Palace
- Appointer: City Assembly
- Term length: 4 years
- Inaugural holder: Milorad Perović
- Formation: 3 October 2004
- Deputy: Andrea Radulović

The president of the City Assembly of Belgrade (Serbian: Председник Скупштине града Београда / Predsednik Skupštine grada Beograda) is the speaker of the City Assembly of Belgrade, capital of Serbia. The president's term lasts four years, and is elected by members of each new assembly. The current president of the City Assembly of Belgrade is Nikola Nikodijević (SPS). He was elected on 23 April 2014, following the 2014 City Assembly election, and re-elected thrice – on 9 May 2018, following the 2018 City Assembly election, on 11 June 2022, following the 2022 City Assembly election, and on 21 June 2024, following the 2024 City Assembly election.

The offices of the president of the City Assembly of Belgrade and the mayor of Belgrade were merged and held by the same person until 2004, when they were separated.

== Office ==
According to the current legislation, the City Assembly elects the president and deputy president of the City Assembly of Belgrade from the complement of the councilors for the four-year term.

== Authorities (competences) ==
- Organizing the work of the City Assembly;
- Summoning sessions, suggesting the agenda and presiding over the City Assembly sessions;
- Looking after implementation of the transparency of work of the City Assembly;
- Signing bylaws adopted by the City Assembly, and
- Performing any other operations entrusted by the City Assembly.

== List of presidents ==
Portrait	Name (Birth–Death)	Term of office			Political party
Portrait	Name (Birth–Death)	Took office	Left office	Time in office	Political party
	Milorad Perović (born 1960)	3 October 2004	8 October 2007	3 years, 5 days	Democratic Party of Serbia
	Zoran Alimpić (born 1965)	8 October 2007	21 July 2008	287 days	Democratic Party
	Branislav Belić (1932–2016)	21 July 2008	15 December 2008	147 days	Democratic Party
	Aleksandar Antić (born 1968)	16 December 2008	30 August 2013	4 years, 257 days	Socialist Party of Serbia
	Nikola Nikodijević (born 1981)	23 April 2014	Incumbent	12 years, 137 days	Socialist Party of Serbia

== See also ==
- City Assembly of Belgrade
- Mayor of Belgrade
