= Radmila Vasić =

Serbian politician

- Радмила Васић

Member of the National Assembly of the Republic of Serbia
- In office 1 August 2022 – 6 February 2024

Member of the City Assembly of Belgrade
- In office 11 June 2022 – 30 October 2023

Personal details
- Born: 14 December 1967 (age 58) Kosovska Kamenica, AP KiM, SR Serbia, SFR Yugoslavia
- Party: Dveri

Radmila Vasić (Serbian Cyrillic: Радмила Васић; born 14 December 1967) is a Serbian politician. She served in the Serbian parliament from 2022 to 2024 and the Belgrade city assembly from 2022 to 2023. Formerly a prominent member of Dveri, Vasić left the party in September 2024.

== Early life and career ==
Vasić was born in Kosovska Kamenica, in what was then the Autonomous Province of Kosovo and Metohija in the Socialist Republic of Serbia, Socialist Federal Republic of Yugoslavia. She was raised in the community and graduated from the Faculty of Civil Engineering and Architecture in 1994, later working on the control and construction of commercial and residential buildings. Since 1999, she has worked for Kopovi and Građevinar Kocić in Belgrade.

== Politics ==
Vasić joined Dveri when the movement became a political party in 2011.

=== Municipal delegate (2012–20) ===
Vasić appeared in the third position on Dveri's electoral list for the Zvezdara municipal assembly in the 2012 Serbian local elections and was elected when the list won three seats. The Democratic Party (DS) won the election, and the Dveri delegates served afterward in opposition.

She also appeared in the 180th position on Dveri's list in the 2012 Serbian parliamentary election and the forty-second position on its list in the 2012 Belgrade city assembly election, both of which occurred concurrently with the municipal vote. The party did not cross the electoral threshold for assembly representation at either level. She was promoted to the twenty-seventh position on Dveri's list for the 2014 Serbian parliamentary election, in which the party once again failed to cross the threshold. She was elected to the main board of Dveri in 2015.

Vasić received the third position on a combined Dveri–Democratic Party of Serbia (DSS) list in Zvezdara for the 2016 Serbian local elections and was re-elected when the list won three seats. The Serbian Progressive Party (SNS) and its allies won the election, and Dveri again served in opposition. She also appeared in the forty-seventh position on a Dveri–DSS list in the concurrent 2016 Serbian parliamentary election and was not elected when the list won thirteen seats. Vasić filed criminal charges with the Higher Public Prosecutor's Office in Belgrade during the 2016–20 municipal assembly, accusing the Zvezdara government of illegal spending practices.

Dveri contested the 2018 Belgrade city assembly election on a combined list with the Enough is Enough (DJB) political movement, and Vasić appeared in the thirty-fifth position. The list did not cross the electoral threshold.

Dveri joined an opposition boycott of the 2020 parliamentary election and the concurrent 2020 local elections, accusing the governing Serbian Progressive Party of undermining Serbia's democratic institutions. Vasić's term in the Zvezdara assembly came to an end that year. In May 2020, she was elected as the leader Dveri's city board in Belgrade and a member of the party presidency.

=== Parliamentarian and Belgrade city delegate (2022–24) ===
The opposition's electoral boycott ended in 2022, and Dveri ran a combined list with Žika Gojković's branch of the Movement for the Restoration of the Kingdom of Serbia (POKS) in the 2022 parliamentary election. Vasić appeared in the eighth position on the list and was elected when the list won ten seats, six of which were assigned to Dveri members. The SNS and its allies won the election, and Dveri served in opposition. In May 2022, Vasić said that Dveri would represent "the voice of the people" in opposing sanctions against Russia against the backdrop of the Russian invasion of Ukraine.

During her assembly term, Vasić was a deputy member of the labour committee, (Note: Formally known as the Committee on Labour, Social Issues, Social Inclusion, and Poverty Reduction.) the health and family committee, and the administrative committee, (Note: Formally known as the Committee on Administrative, Budgetary, Mandate, and Immunity Issues.) as well as being the leader of Serbia's parliamentary friendship group with Latvia and a member of the friendship groups with Argentina, Armenia, Austria, Belarus, Bosnia and Herzegovina, Brazil, the Caribbean countries (Antigua and Barbuda, Barbados, Belize, Cyprus, the Czech Republic, Dominica, Haiti, Saint Kitts and Nevis, and Saint Lucia), China, Cuba, Denmark, France, Georgia, Greece, Hungary, Italy, Japan, Mexico, Montenegro, the Netherlands, North Macedonia, Portugal, Romania, Russia, Slovakia, Slovenia, Spain, Switzerland, and the United States of America. She was elected as a vice-president of Dveri in May 2023.

Vasić also led the Dveri–POKS list in the 2022 Belgrade city assembly election, which was held concurrently with the parliamentary vote, and was elected when the list won four seats. The SNS alliance won a plurality victory and later formed a coalition government in the city, and the Dveri delegates served in opposition at this level as well.

Vasić was sometimes a spokesperson for her party's socially conservative views during her time as an elected official. In August 2022, she tried to start a debate in the Belgrade assembly on Dveri's proposal to cancel EuroPride. She was overruled on the grounds that the City of Belgrade was not the organizer of the event. The EuroPride match ultimately took place the following month despite a last-minute ban by the Serbian government. Vasić later filed criminal charges against Serbian prime minister Ana Brnabić for inviting LGBT Serbian citizens to gather in spite of the ban, arguing that the gathering put public safety at risk.

Her term in the city assembly ended on 30 October 2023, when the assembly was dissolved for an early election.

For the 2023 Serbian parliamentary election and the concurrent 2023 Belgrade city assembly election, Dveri ran a combined slate with the far-right Serbian Party Oathkeepers (SSZ). Vasić appeared in the tenth position on the Dveri–Oathkeepers list for the parliamentary vote and the fourth position for the city assembly vote. In both instances, the list failed to cross the electoral threshold. Vasić's term in the national assembly ended when the new parliament convened in February 2024.

=== Since 2024 ===
Dveri contested the 2024 local elections in Zvezdara on a combined list with the People's Party (Narodna), and Vasić appeared in the third position. The list did not cross the electoral threshold.

Vasić left Dveri in September 2024, citing serious structural issues within the party.
