= Zoran Babić =

Serbian politician

- Зоран Бабић
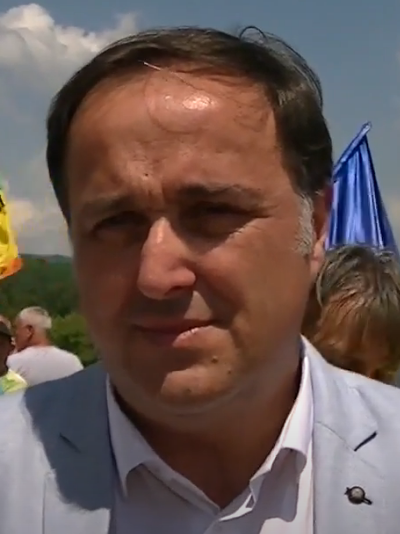
- Babić in 2018

Leader of the Serbian Progressive Party parliamentary group
- In office 27 August 2013 – 3 June 2016
- Preceded by: Veroljub Arsić
- Succeeded by: Aleksandar Martinović

Member of the National Assembly
- In office 25 June 2008 – 3 June 2016

Personal details
- Born: 16 April 1971 (age 53); Vrnjačka Banja, SR Serbia, SFR Yugoslavia
- Political party: SRS (2006–2008); SNS (2008–present)
- Spouse: Nataša Babić (divorced)
- Children: 2
- Education: University of Belgrade

Zoran Babić (Serbian Cyrillic: Зоран Бабић; born 16 April 1971) is a Serbian politician. A member of the Serbian Progressive Party (SNS), he served as the leader of its parliamentary group from 2013 to 2016.

== Early life ==
Babić was born on 16 April 1971 in Vrnjačka Banja, SR Serbia, SFR Yugoslavia, where he finished primary and secondary school. He graduated from the Faculty of Mechanical Engineering of the University of Belgrade in 1996.

== Career ==
He began his career at the agricultural company "ZM produkt" in Vrnjačka Banja, where he served as marketing director.

He joined the Serbian Radical Party (SRS) in 2006, and two years later he was elected MP. Later that year he defected to the Serbian Progressive Party (SNS). After the 2012 parliamentary election, Babić was appointed deputy head of the Serbian Progressive Party parliamentary group. In 2013, he became the head of the group. He did not appear on the ballot list for the 2016 parliamentary election, and he was succeeded by Aleksandar Martinović as the head of the parliamentary group.

== Personal life ==
Babić has two daughters, Teodora and Julijana, and was married to Nataša Babić.

In late January 2019, he was involved in a traffic accident that occurred near Doljevac, which a woman was killed. Shortly after the incident, he resigned from his position as director of "Koridori Srbije".
