= Aleksandar Mirković =

Serbian politician (born 1988)

- Александар Мирковић
- Born: 12 July 1988 (age 38); Belgrade, Yugoslavia
- Occupation: Politician

Aleksandar Mirković (Serbian: Александар Мирковић; born 12 July 1988) is a Serbian politician. He has led the Serbian Progressive Party group in the Assembly of the City of Belgrade since 2018 and was elected to the National Assembly of Serbia in the 2020 parliamentary election.

== Early life and career ==
Mirković was born and raised in the Belgrade municipality of Voždovac. He has a bachelor's degree in economics.

== Political career ==
=== Municipal politician ===
Mirković was deputy leader of the Progressive Party's municipal board in Belgrade from 2010 to 2013. He received the 26th position on the party's electoral list in the 2012 Belgrade City Assembly election and was elected when the list won 37 mandates. The election was won by the Democratic Party and its allies, and Mirković served as a member of the opposition. The Democratic-led administration lost its majority in late 2013 and a new city election was called for 2014. Mirković was not a candidate in this election. Instead, he received the fourteenth position on the Serbian Progressive Party's list in the December 2013 Voždovac municipal election and was elected when the list won a majority victory with 36 out of 55 mandates.

Mirković received the fourth position on the Progressive Party's list in the 2016 Voždovac municipal election and was elected to a second term when the list won 26 mandates. He was also re-elected to the Belgrade city assembly in the 2018 city election, ranked 32nd on the Progressive list and was returned when the list won a majority victory with 64 four out of 110 seats. Mirković was named leader of the Serbian Progressive Party in the city assembly following the election.

=== Parliamentarian ===
Mirković received the 48th position on the Progressive Party's list in the 2020 Serbian parliamentary election and was elected when the list won a landslide majority with 188 out of 250 mandates. He later became member of the assembly's defence and internal affairs committee and the committee on Kosovo-Metohija: a deputy member of the committee on spatial planning, transport, infrastructure, and telecommunications. The leader of Serbia's parliamentary friendship group with Argentina – as well as a member of the parliamentary friendship groups with the Bahamas, Botswana, Brazil, Cameroon, the Central African Republic, Chile, China, Comoros, Cuba, Ecuador, Equatorial Guinea, Eritrea, Greece, Grenada, Guinea-Bissau, Jamaica, Japan, Kyrgyzstan, Laos, Liberia, Madagascar, Mali, Mauritius, Mexico, Morocco, Mozambique, Nauru, Nicaragua, Nigeria, Palau, Papua New Guinea, Paraguay, Peru, Portugal, Russia, Saint Vincent and the Grenadines, Sao Tome and Principe, South Sudan, Spain, Sri Lanka, the Dominican Republic, the Republic of Congo, the Solomon Islands – alongside the countries of Sub-Saharan Africa, Sudan, Suriname, Togo, Trinidad and Tobago, Uruguay, Uzbekistan, and Venezuela.
