= Milovan Marinković =

Serbian politician and mayor of Belgrade late 19th, early 20th century

- Милован Маринковић
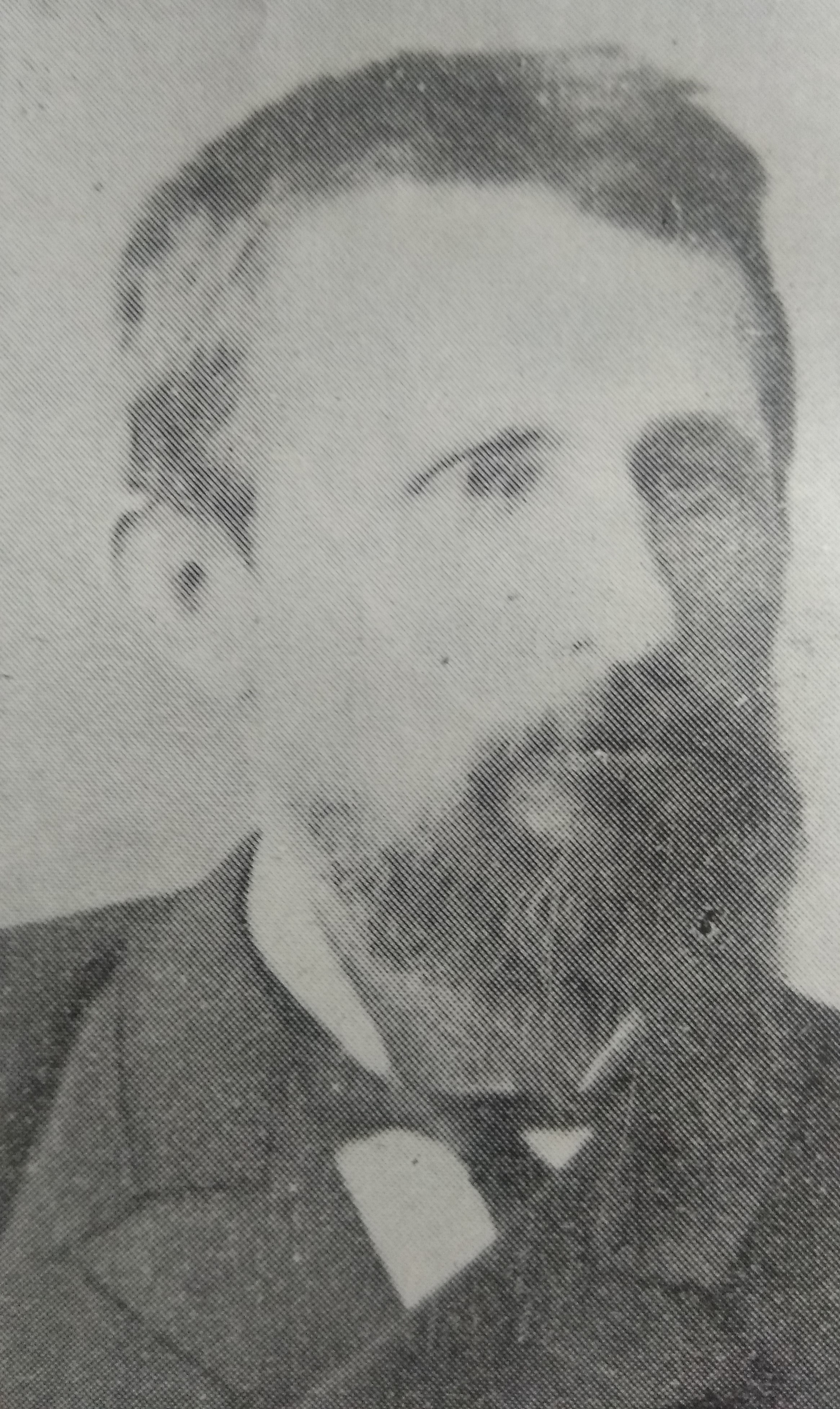

Mayor of Belgrade
- In office 28 May 1901 – 06 Nov 1902
- Monarch: Alexander I
- Preceded by: Antonije Pantović
- Succeeded by: Nikola Stamenković
- In office 06 Apr 1893 – 12 May 1894
- Monarch: Alexander I
- Preceded by: Petar Tatić
- Succeeded by: Mihailo Bogićević
- In office 26 May 1891 – 22 Nov 1892
- Monarch: Alexander I
- Preceded by: Nikola Petar Pašić
- Succeeded by: Petar Tatić

Milovan Marinković (Serbian Cyrillic: Милован Маринковић); was a politician in the Kingdom of Serbia during the late 19th and early 20th centuries. He served three terms as mayor of Belgrade between 1891 and 1902.

== First term as mayor of Belgrade ==
=== 1891 Mayoral Election ===
On 15 April 1881, the board of the municipality of Belgrade decided to hold elections for the president of the municipality on 5 May, as the previous president, Nikola Pašić, had vacated the position after becoming the president of the Council of Ministers of Serbia. The elections for the president of the Belgrade municipality were called for 19 May 1891. Milovan Marinković, a director and professor from Belgrade, was elected as the mayor of the municipality after receiving 91.7 % of the votes (785 votes) while his opponent, Dragutin Ilić received only 8.3% of the votes (71 votes). On 23 May 1891 Marinković's election as mayor was confirmed by the municipal court of the city of Belgrade. Marinković, took the oath and assumed his duties at an extraordinary session of the Belgrade board on 23 May 1891.

=== Inauguration of Belgrade's first tram line ===
On 14 October 1892, under the leadership of Mayor Marinković, Belgrade inaugurated its first tram line, which ran from Kalemegdan to Slavija and was horse-powered. Marinković, accompanied by members of his administration, was among the first passengers on this historic journey. The tram set off at 11:00 AM, making its way toward Terazije Square, where thousands of citizens had gathered to witness the event.
