= Mayor of Belgrade =

Head of the City of Belgrade

- Градоначелник Београда; Gradonačelnik Beograda
- Coat of arms of Belgrade

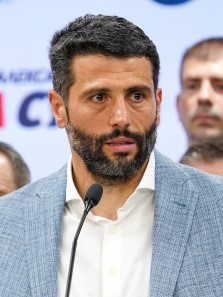
- Incumbent; Aleksandar Šapić since 24 June 2024
- Style: Mayor
- Member of: City Council
- Reports to: City Assembly
- Residence: No official residence
- Seat: Old Palace
- Term length: 4 years
- Inaugural holder: Ilija Čarapić
- Formation: 7 May 1839
- Deputy: Vesna Vidović
- Salary: €1,399 monthly

The mayor of Belgrade (Serbian: Градоначелник Београда, romanized: Gradonačelnik Beograda) is the head of the City of Belgrade (the capital and largest city of Serbia). The mayor acts on behalf of the city, and performs an executive function in the City of Belgrade. The position is important as the city is the most important hub of economy, culture, science and technology in Serbia.

The current mayor of Belgrade is Aleksandar Šapić of the Serbian Progressive Party, elected after the 2024 City Assembly election.

== Office ==
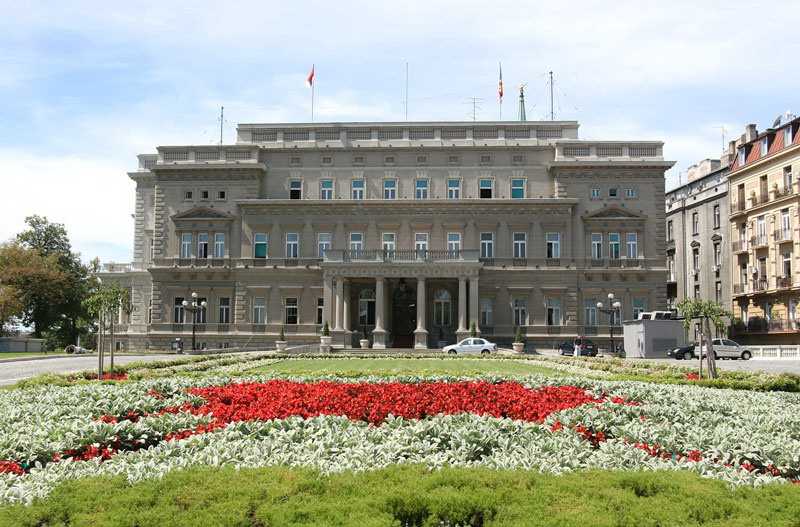
The City Hall (Old Palace) – Office of the mayor. Built in 1884 according to the project of architect Aleksandar Bugarski.

According to the current legislation, the mayor is elected along with members of the City Assembly at the direct secret ballot for the period of four years. The mayor may not be a councilor of the City Assembly.

In case of an extended absence or other reason that prevents the discharge of their duties, the mayor is replaced by a deputy mayor. The mayor appoints and dismisses the deputy mayor based on the approval of the City Assembly.

The mayor is concurrently the chairman of the city council with the right to vote.

== Authorities (competences) of the mayor ==
- Immediate execution and/or looking after carrying out of the decisions and/or other documents of the City Assembly;
- Proposing of draft decisions and/or other documents to be made by the City Assembly, as well as the manner of resolving the issues to be decided by the City Assembly;
- Looking after carrying out of the entrusted duties within the scope of rights and responsibilities of the Republic;
- Directing and coordinating of operations of the City Administration;
- Proposing of the appointment and/or dismissal of the Head and Deputy Head of the City Administration;
- Deciding on granting the right to use or lease the property, as well as on terminating the contracts on granting the right to use or lease such property, and charging the mortgage over the property used by the City and/or City Administration under the approval of the Property Directorate of the Republic of Serbia;
- The Mayor is the executive authority in charge of the budget implementation;
- Making of individual documents he is authorized to present under the current legislation, Charter or decision of the City Assembly;
- Establishing of the expert working bodies in charge of their respective terms of references, and
- Performing of any duties as provided for by the Charter, and/or other bylaws of the City.

== List of mayors ==
Denotes Acting Mayor
Denotes Temporary Council

=== Principality of Serbia ===
- Ilija Čarapić (7 May 1839 – 27 May 1840)
- Miloš Bogićević (28 May 1840 – 24 September 1840)
- Mladen Žujović (25 September 1840 – till end of 1841)
- Stojan Delimirković (1855)
- Marko Stojković (1861 – 1862)
- Jovan Smiljanić (1865 – 1866)
- Gligorije Jovanović (1866)
- Mihailo Terzibašić (6 September 1866 – 14 September 1867)
- Jovan Nikolić-Čokojić (14 September 1867 – 1868)
- Vasilije Ivanović (1868)
- Gligorije Jovanović (1868)
- Aćim Čumić (1869)
- Arsa Lukić (27 December 1869 – April 1871)
- Aleksa Đurić (10 June 1871 – 31 December 1872)
- Dimitrije Popović (30 March 1872 – August 1878)
- Aleksa Stevanović (August 1878 – October 1879)
- Živko Karabiberović (October 1879 – 6 March 1882)

=== Kingdom of Serbia ===
- Živko Karabiberović (6 March 1882 – 1 August 1884)
- Vladan Đorđević (1 August 1884 – 10 August 1885) (Serbian Progressive Party)
- Mihailo Bogićević (4 April 1886 – 4 February 1887)
- Svetomir Nikolajević (7 March 1887 – 1 September 1887) (People's Radical Party)
- Živko Karabiberović (1 September 1887 – 30 December 1889)
- Nikola Pašić (30 December 1889 – 14 January 1891) (People's Radical Party)
- Milovan Marinković (26 May 1891 – 22 November 1892)
- Petar Tatić (23 November 1892 – 2 April 1893)
- Milovan Marinković (6 April 1893 – 12 May 1894)
- Mihailo Bogićević (14 May 1894 – 8 November 1896)
- Nikola Stevanović (5 December 1896 – 31 December 1896)
- Nikola Pašić (10 January 1897 – 13 November 1897) (People's Radical Party)
- Nikola Stevanović (13 November 1897 – 14 November 1899)
- Antonije Pantović (20 November 1899 – 13 April 1901)
- Milovan Marinković (28 May 1901 – 6 November 1902)
- Nikola Stamenković (28 March 1903 – 11 August 1903)
- Kosta Glavinić (20 August 1903 – 20 November 1907)
- Velisav Vulović (1 January 1908 – 10 October 1909)
- Kosta Glavinić (11 April 1910 – 21 September 1910)
- Ljubomir Davidović (24 October 1910 – 19 January 1914) (Independent Radical Party)
- Đorđe Nestorović (1 February 1914 – January 1919)

=== Kingdom of Serbs, Croats and Slovenes / Kingdom of Yugoslavia ===
Portrait	Name (Birth–Death)	Term of office			Political party
Portrait	Name (Birth–Death)	Took office	Left office	Time in office	Political party
	Mihailo Marjanović (1871–1925)	January 1919	9 November 1919	10 months	People's Radical Party
	Kosta Jovanović (1875–1930)	9 November 1919	25 August 1920	290 days	Democratic Party
	Filip Filipović (1878–1938)	25 August 1920	25 August 1920	0 days	Communist Party of Yugoslavia
	Đoka Kara-Jovanović	2 September 1920	3 March 1921	182 days	People's Radical Party
	Dobra Mitrović (1886–1923)	9 March 1921	12 March 1923	2 years, 3 days	People's Radical Party
	Mihailo Marjanović (1871–1925)	22 August 1923	6 January 1925	1 year, 137 days	People's Radical Party
	Kosta Kumanudi (1874–1962)	22 August 1926	18 February 1929	2 years, 180 days	Democratic Party
	Miloš Savčić (1865–1941)	18 February 1929	23 May 1930	1 year, 94 days	Independent
	Milan Nešić (1886–1970)	23 May 1930	12 May 1932	1 year, 355 days	Independent
	Milutin Petrović	12 May 1932	5 January 1935	2 years, 238 days	Independent
	Vlada Ilić (1882–1952)	10 January 1935	13 September 1939	4 years, 246 days	Independent
	Vojin Đuričić	13 September 1939	20 June 1940	281 days	Independent
	Jevrem Tomić	20 June 1940	12 April 1941	296 days	Independent
	Ivan Milićević	12 April 1941	19 June 1941	68 days	Independent

=== Nedić's regime under Nazi German occupation ===
Portrait	Name (Birth–Death)	Term of office			Political party
Portrait	Name (Birth–Death)	Took office	Left office	Time in office	Political party
	Milosav Stojadinović	19 June 1941	29 August 1941	71 days	Independent
	Dragomir Jovanović (1902–1946)	29 August 1941	20 October 1944	3 years, 52 days	Independent

=== DF Yugoslavia / FPR Yugoslavia / SFR Yugoslavia ===
Portrait	Name (Birth–Death)	Term of office			Political party
Portrait	Name (Birth–Death)	Took office	Left office	Time in office	Political party
	Mihajlo Ratković	1944	1946	2 years	League of Communists of Yugoslavia
	Ninko Petrović (1896–1981)	1946	18 May 1951	5 years	League of Communists of Yugoslavia
	Đurica Jojkić (1914–1981)	18 May 1951	February 1955	3 years, 8 months	League of Communists of Yugoslavia
	Miloš Minić (1914–2003)	February 1955	8 April 1957	2 years, 2 months	League of Communists of Yugoslavia
	Đurica Jojkić (1914–1981)	8 April 1957	26 May 1961	4 years, 48 days	League of Communists of Yugoslavia
	Milijan Neoričić (1922–2014)	26 May 1961	15 April 1965	3 years, 324 days	League of Communists of Yugoslavia
	Branko Pešić (1922–1986)	15 April 1965	May 1974	9 years	League of Communists of Yugoslavia
	Živorad Kovačević (1930–2011)	May 1974	29 April 1982	7 years, 11 months	League of Communists of Yugoslavia
	Bogdan Bogdanović (1922–2010)	29 April 1982	29 April 1986	4 years	League of Communists of Yugoslavia
	Aleksandar Bakočević (1928–2007)	29 April 1986	4 December 1989	3 years, 219 days	League of Communists of Yugoslavia
	Milorad Unković (1945–2013)	4 December 1989	2 July 1992	2 years, 211 days	League of Communists of Yugoslavia

=== FR Yugoslavia / Serbia and Montenegro ===
Portrait	Name (Birth–Death)	Term of office			Political party
Portrait	Name (Birth–Death)	Took office	Left office	Time in office	Political party
	Slobodanka Gruden (1940–2025)	2 July 1992	22 June 1994	1 year, 355 days	Socialist Party of Serbia
	Nebojša Čović (born 1958)	23 June 1994	21 February 1997	2 years, 243 days	Socialist Party of Serbia
	Zoran Đinđić (1952–2003)	21 February 1997	30 September 1997	221 days	Democratic Party
	Milan Božić (born 1952)	30 September 1997	22 January 1999	1 year, 114 days	Serbian Renewal Movement
	Vojislav Mihailović (born 1951)	22 January 1999	5 October 2000	1 year, 257 days	Serbian Renewal Movement
	Milan St. Protić (born 1957)	5 October 2000	20 March 2001	166 days	New Serbia (DOS)
	Dragan Jočić (born 1960)	20 March 2001	1 June 2001	73 days	Democratic Party of Serbia (DOS)
	Radmila Hrustanović (born 1952)	1 June 2001	7 October 2004	3 years, 128 days	Civic Alliance of Serbia (DOS)
	Nenad Bogdanović (1954–2007)	7 October 2004	5 June 2006	1 year, 241 days	Democratic Party

=== Republic of Serbia ===
Portrait	Name (Birth–Death)	Term of office			Political party
Portrait	Name (Birth–Death)	Took office	Left office	Time in office	Political party
	Nenad Bogdanović (1954–2007)	5 June 2006	27 September 2007†	1 year, 114 days	Democratic Party
	Zoran Alimpić (born 1965)	27 September 2007	21 July 2008	298 days	Democratic Party
	Branislav Belić (1932–2016)	21 July 2008	19 August 2008	29 days	Democratic Party
	Dragan Đilas (born 1967)	19 August 2008	18 November 2013 (Note: Dismissed by the City Assembly of Belgrade on 24 September 2013.)	5 years, 91 days	Democratic Party
	Temporary Council (Note: Serbian: Привремено веће, romanized: Privremeno veće.) (Note: Members: President Siniša Mali (SNS), Nikola Nikodijević (SPS), Andreja Mladenović (DSS), Tatjana Pašić (DS) (until 10 December 2013) and Nebojša Čović (SNS).)	18 November 2013	24 April 2014	157 days	Multipartisan
	Siniša Mali (born 1972)	24 April 2014	28 May 2018	4 years, 34 days	Serbian Progressive Party
	Andreja Mladenović (born 1975)	28 May 2018	7 June 2018	10 days	Independent Democratic Party of Serbia (Note: Endorsed by the Serbian Progressive Party.)
	Zoran Radojičić (born 1963)	7 June 2018	20 June 2022	4 years, 13 days	Independent (Note: Nominated to the post by the Serbian Progressive Party.)
	Aleksandar Šapić (born 1978)	20 June 2022	30 October 2023 (Note: Tendered his resignation on 29 September 2023.)	1 year, 132 days	Serbian Progressive Party
	Temporary Council (Note: Members: President Aleksandar Šapić (SNS), Aleksandar Mirković (SNS), Nikola Nikodijević (SPS), Vladimir Obradović (Independent), Dobrica Veselinović (ZLF).)	30 October 2023	24 June 2024	238 days	Multipartisan
	Aleksandar Šapić (born 1978)	24 June 2024	Incumbent	2 years, 150 days	Serbian Progressive Party

== See also ==
- Belgrade City Administration
- City Assembly of Belgrade
  - President of the City Assembly of Belgrade
