= Independent Democratic Party of Serbia =

Defunct political party in Serbia

The Independent Democratic Party of Serbia (Serbian Cyrillic: Самостална демократска странка Србије, romanized: Samostalna demokratska stranka Srbije, Samostalni DSS) was a conservative political party in Serbia that existed from 2015 to 2020.

The party was formed in 2015 following a split from the Democratic Party of Serbia (DSS). Its leader was Andreja Mladenović, who served as deputy mayor of Belgrade from 2014 to 2018 and was briefly a member of the National Assembly in 2016.

== History ==
The Serbian Progressive Party (SNS) and its allies won a majority in the 2014 Belgrade City Assembly election, securing sixty-three out of 110 seats. The Democratic Party of Serbia (DSS) finished in fourth place with nine seats and subsequently joined the SNS in a coalition government. Andreja Mladenović, who had led the DSS group in the previous assembly term, was appointed deputy mayor of Belgrade with SNS support.

In July 2015, DSS leader Sanda Rašković Ivić expelled Mladenović and six other members of the party's Belgrade assembly group, accusing them of attempting to turn the DSS into a satellite of the SNS. The expelled members rejected this decision as unjust and contrary to party policy, subsequently forming the Independent Democratic Party of Serbia (Samostalni DSS) with Mladenović as their leader. Initially identifying as a faction within the DSS, they stated their intention to work toward the party's renewal.

By October 2015, the Samostalni DSS had formally become an independent political party, with Mladenović elected as its first leader at the founding convention. The party established branches in several municipalities across Serbia, attracting some local assembly members.

Mladenović aligned the Samostalni DSS with the SNS at both the national and municipal levels. He was placed tenth on the SNS-led coalition's electoral list in the 2016 Serbian parliamentary election, a position that effectively guaranteed his election. The coalition won a majority with 131 out of 250 seats, securing Mladenović’s place in the National Assembly. However, due to Serbian regulations prohibiting dual mandates, he resigned as a national assembly member on 3 October 2016 to remain deputy mayor of Belgrade.

By 2017, the Samostalni DSS had become largely inactive. In the 2018 Belgrade City Assembly election, Mladenović was re-elected to the city assembly, officially running as an SNS-endorsed candidate. In May–June 2018, he briefly served as acting mayor of Belgrade before being appointed an assistant to new mayor Zoran Radojičić.

In November 2019, the Samostalni DSS announced a merger with the Movement for the Development of Serbia and the National Democratic Political Council to form the Independent Serbian Party. The merger was formalized in February 2020, with Mladenović serving as the new party’s first leader.
