= Veroljub Arsić =

Serbian politician

Veroljub Arsić (Serbian Cyrillic: Верољуб Арсић; born 28 August 1969) is a politician in Serbia. He has served in the National Assembly of Serbia since 2001, originally as a member of the Serbian Radical Party and since 2008 as a member of the Serbian Progressive Party.

== Early life and career ==
Arsić was born in Požarevac, in what was then the Socialist Republic of Serbia in the Socialist Federal Republic of Yugoslavia. His graduated from the high school of electrical engineering in Kostolac, was appointed director of a business centre in Požarevac in January 1990, and has operated his own business in the city since 1992.

== Politician ==
=== Radical Party ===
Arsić received the twenty-sixth position on the electoral list of Vojislav Šešelj's Serbian Radical Party in the 2000 Serbian parliamentary election. The Radicals won twenty-three seats (out of 250) and became the second-largest opposition party in the legislature; Arsić was included in the party's delegation and took his seat when the assembly met in early 2001. (From 2000 to 2011, Serbian parliamentary mandates were awarded to sponsoring parties or coalitions rather than to individual candidates, and it was common practice for mandates to be awarded out of numerical order. Arsić's numerical position on the list had no official bearing on his election.)

Arsić was again included in the Radical Party's parliamentary delegation after the 2003 election, in which he received the twentieth list position. The Radicals won eighty-two seats to become the largest group in the assembly, although they did not have a majority of seats and did not form government. During the 2004 Serbian presidential election, Arsić participated in at least one major rally with Radical Party candidate Tomislav Nikolić.

He received the seventy-seventh position on the Radical Party's list for the 2007 parliamentary election and the seventh-fourth position in the 2008 election, and was again included in the party's delegation each time. The Radical Party remained in opposition throughout this period.

=== Progressive Party ===
The Radical Party experienced a serious split following the 2008 election, with several members joining the more moderate Progressive Party under the leadership of Nikolić and Aleksandar Vučić.

Serbia's electoral system was reformed in 2011, such that parliamentary mandates were awarded in numerical order to candidates on successful lists. In the 2012 parliamentary election, Arsić received the forty-first position on the Progressive Party's Let's Get Serbia Moving coalition list and was re-elected when the list won seventy-three seats. The Progressive Party subsequently formed a coalition government with the Socialist Party of Serbia and other parties, and Arsić served as the Progressive whip in the assembly.

Rumours circulated in 2013 that Radical Party leader Vojislav Šešelj would be permitted to return to Serbia from the International Criminal Tribunal for the former Yugoslavia in The Hague, where he was then facing charges for war crimes, and various Serbian politicians speculated on how his return could impact the country's political scene. Arsić was quoted as saying, "[Šešelj] could hardly bring the [Radical Party] back to the assembly if he persists with the rhetoric of ten years ago. Serbia has taken another course and he cannot understand that. Myself, I am very much prepared for his rhetoric and debates because I know him better than others." Šešelj ultimately did not return to Serbia at this time, although he did so following a provisional release by the tribunal the following year.

Arsić received the thirteenth position on the Progressive Party's Aleksandar Vučić — Future We Believe In list in the 2014 parliamentary election and was returned when the list won a majority victory with 158 seats. He was appointed as a deputy speaker after the election. He was also appointed as chair of the assembly's committee on finance; in May 2014, he announced that a revised budget by Vučić's administration would introduce low-interest state-subsidized loans.

In May 2014, Arsić led Serbia's delegation to the South-East European Cooperation Process (SEECP). He attempted to steer a middle course between Russian and European interests, noting that the Serbian delegation "did not support [SEECP's] statement on the crisis in Ukraine, due to the controversial wording about 'annexation of Crimea,' but did not block its adoption either."

Arsić received the twenty-second position on the Aleksandar Vučić – Serbia Is Winning list in the 2016 parliamentary election and was returned to a seventh term in parliament when the alliance won a second consecutive majority with 131 seats. During the 2016–20 assembly, in addition to serving as a deputy speaker, he was a member of the parliamentary committee on the rights of the child and the committee on finance, state budget and control of public spending; a member of the European Union–Serbia stabilization and association parliamentary committee; a member of the sub-committee for the consideration of reports on audits conducted by the state audit institution; the chair of the parliamentary friendship groups with Greece and Cape Verde; and a member of the parliamentary friendship groups with Austria, Azerbaijan, Belarus, China, Cuba, the Czech Republic, Indonesia, Iraq, Ireland, Japan, Morocco, the Netherlands, Romania, Russia, Saudi Arabia, Syria, and the United Kingdom.

He received the fifty-ninth position on the Progressive Party's list in the 2020 Serbian parliamentary election and was elected to an eighth term when the list won a landslide majority with 188 mandates. He is now the chair of the committee on the economy, regional development, trade, tourism, and energy, and a member of the finance committee, the stabilization and association committee, and the audit sub-committee. He is the leader of Serbia's delegation to the Parliamentary Assembly of the Mediterranean, continues to lead the country's parliamentary friendship group with Greece, and is a member of the friendship groups with Angola, Armenia, Austria, Azerbaijan, Belarus, Bulgaria, Cape Verde, Chile, China, Cuba, Cyprus, the Czech Republic, the Democratic Republic of the Congo, Egypt, Ethiopia, the Gambia, Ghana, India, Japan, Jordan, Kazakhstan, Kenya, Kuwait, Morocco, Nepal, North Korea, North Macedonia, Pakistan, Palestine, Poland, Qatar, Russia, Rwanda, Saudi Arabia, Slovakia, South Africa, Spain, the countries of Sub-Saharan Africa, Switzerland, Syria, Turkey, Venezuela, Vietnam, Zambia, and Zimbabwe.

=== Municipal politics ===
Arsić has also served several terms in the Požarevac municipal assembly. He received the lead position on the Radical Party's list in the 2004 Serbian local elections and the second position in 2008 and was included in the party's delegations on both occasions.

After leaving the Radicals, he received the lead position for the Progressive Party in the 2012 and 2016 local elections and was re-elected on both occasions. He did not seek re-election at the local level in 2020.
