= Nikola Nikodijević =

Serbian politician

- Никола Никодијевић

President of the City Assembly of Belgrade
- Incumbent
- Assumed office 21 June 2024
- In office 23 April 2014 – 30 October 2023

Personal details
- Born: 26 September 1981 (age 45) Belgrade, SR Serbia, SFR Yugoslavia
- Party: SPS
- Education: University of Belgrade

Nikola Nikodijević (Serbian Cyrillic: Никола Никодијевић; born 26 September 1981) is a Serbian politician who has been the president of the City Assembly of Belgrade since 2024, previously serving that role from 2014 to 2023. He is a member of the main board of the Socialist Party of Serbia (SPS).

== Biography ==
He was born on 26 September 1981 in Belgrade. He graduated from the Faculty of Law at the University of Belgrade.

In his youth, he was active in sports and was engaged in SD Crvena zvezda.

As a member of the Socialist Party of Serbia (SPS) he was elected to the City Assembly of Belgrade following the 2008 City Assembly election. Until 2012 he served as the head of the SPS-JS deputy group in the City Assembly.

He was named member of the City Council on 13 June 2012 and served until 2013, when he was appointed by the Government of Serbia as a member of the Temporary Council of Belgrade.

He was elected President of the City Assembly of Belgrade on 23 April 2014 and re-elected in 2018 and 2022. His mandate ended on 30 October 2023, when the City Assembly was dissolved. After the 2024 Belgrade City Assembly election, he was re-elected president at the constitutive session on 21 June 2024.
