= Zoran Radojičić =

Serbian pediatric surgeon and politician

- Зоран Радојичић
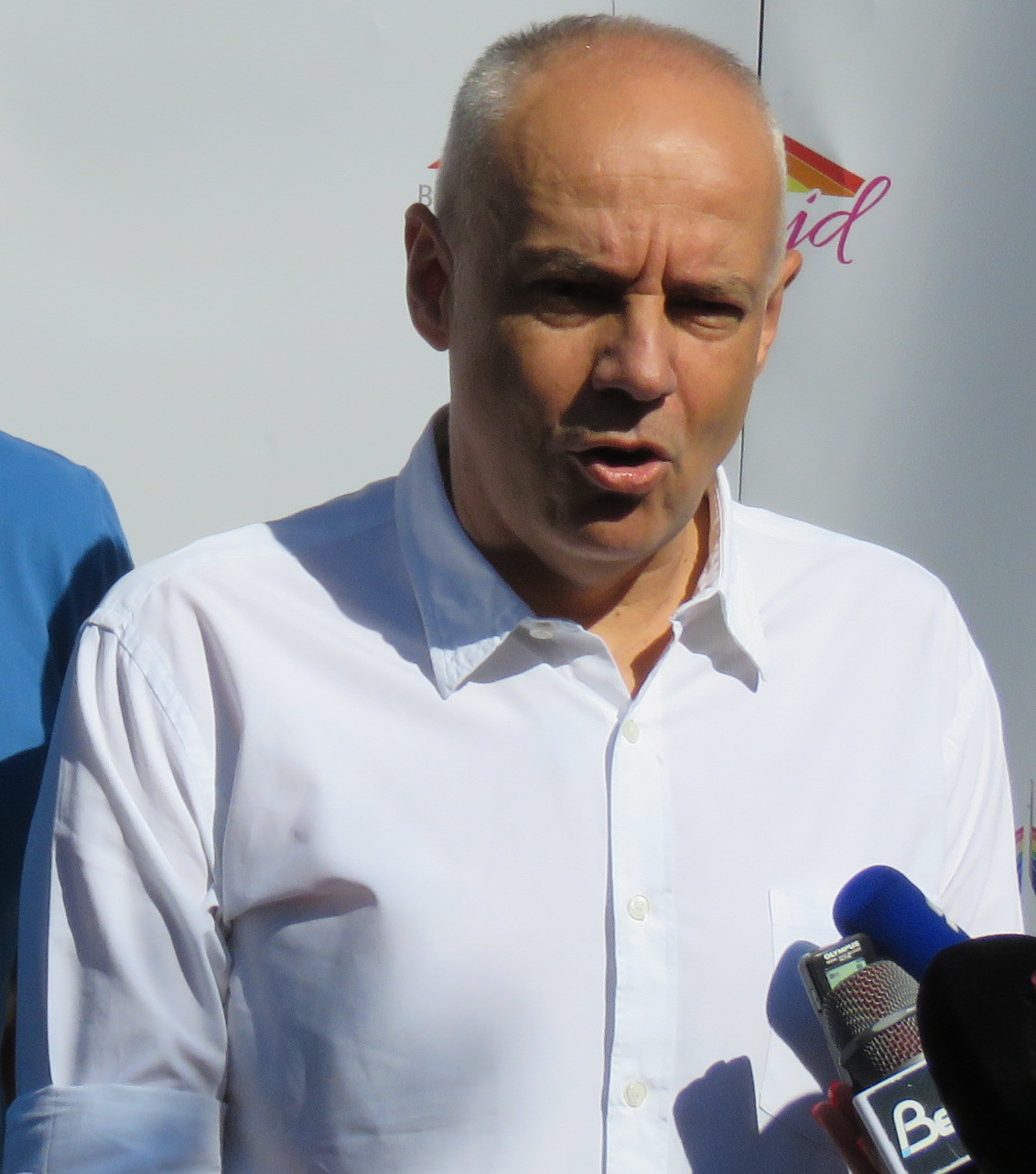
- Radojičić in 2018

74th Mayor of Belgrade
- In office 7 June 2018 – 20 June 2022
- Preceded by: Siniša Mali; Andreja Mladenović (Acting)
- Succeeded by: Aleksandar Šapić

Personal details
- Born: 24 October 1963 (age 62) Belgrade, PR Serbia, Yugoslavia
- Party: Independent (Note: Aligned with SNS.)
- Spouse: Tijana Radojičić
- Children: 2
- Education: Faculty of Medicine
- Alma mater: University of Belgrade
- Occupation: Doctor, politician
- Profession: Pediatric surgery

Zoran Radojičić (Serbian Cyrillic: Зоран Радојичић; born 24 October 1963) is a Serbian pediatric surgeon and politician who served as the mayor of Belgrade from 2018 to 2022.

== Biography ==
=== Early life and education ===
He was born on 24 October 1963 in Lazarevac, Serbia, at the time part of Yugoslavia. In 1989, he graduated from the University of Belgrade Faculty of Medicine, and later obtained magisterial and doctoral thesis in 1998 and 2006, respectively.

=== Medical career ===
Before taking political office in 2018, he practiced pediatric urology at University Children's Hospital in Belgrade, and he is also a professor of surgery at the University of Belgrade Faculty of Medicine.

=== Political career ===
On 7 June 2018, he was appointed as the Mayor of Belgrade on the nomination of Serbian Progressive Party (SNS), following the 2018 Belgrade City Assembly elections. Although Radojičić was the mayor, deputy mayor Goran Vesić wielded more power and influence and was sometimes described as de facto mayor. Radojičić left office on 20 June 2022 when he was succeeded by Aleksandar Šapić.

== Personal life ==
He is married to Tijana and has two sons with her – Ivan and Ognjen.

Political offices
Preceded by Siniša Mali; Andreja Mladenović (Acting)	Mayor of Belgrade; 2018–2022	Succeeded by Aleksandar Šapić
