= 2018 Belgrade City Assembly election =

Serbian local election

- 4 March 2018
- All 110 seats in the City Assembly; 56 seats needed for a majority
- Turnout: 51.3%
Party	Leader	Vote %	Seats	+/–
SNS–led list	Aleksandar Vučić	44.99	64	+1
PSG–NS–LS	Dragan Đilas	18.93	26	New
Šapić List	Aleksandar Šapić	9.01	12	New
SPS–JS	Aleksandar Antić	6.13	8	−8
This lists parties that won seats. See the complete results below.
Mayor before	Mayor after
Siniša Mali; SNS	Zoran Radojičić; Independent

The local election for the City Assembly of Belgrade, capital of Serbia, was held on 4 March 2018. The election had to be scheduled by the end of February 2018, since this is when the mandate of the current City Assembly expires. Parties and coalitions ran for 110 seats in the Assembly, with 5% election threshold required to win seats.

== Background ==
Current City assembly was elected in 2014, after Dragan Đilas, mayor at that time, lost a no-confidence motion, and was replaced by a Temporary Council, led by Siniša Mali, then an independent endorsed by the Serbian Progressive Party (SNS). After the election, the Assembly's composition was significantly changed, since Democratic party (DS) lost substantial number of seats, while SNS coalition obtained majority of them. This election marked an ending to 9-year rule of Democratic party in Belgrade.

Siniša Mali was elected mayor by the City Assembly on 24 April 2014. During his term, Belgrade Waterfront project commenced, a large urban development project, though marked by a number of protests of local population. Key moment in Mali's term was demolition of a city block to make way for Belgrade Waterfront project. This caused massive demonstrations in the City, and almost led to Mali's resignation from the post. However, backed by the then-prime minister Aleksandar Vučić, Mali kept his position, and will complete his term as Mayor, though it remains uncertain whether he will be a mayoral candidate in the upcoming elections.

It is yet unclear how will the opposition parties organize themselves for the election, but pollsters conduct polls as if there is a relatively united opposition front against the ruling parties, with the exception of Šapić, who is the current head of Novi Beograd municipality, who stated that he is not interested in pre-election coalitions, and that he will compete alone. Besides that, the ruling parties also didn't reveal whether they (SNS and SPS) will form an election coalition, or will they compete separately.

Dragan Đilas stated that he will enter the race for mayor of Belgrade, and gathered support from PSG, NS and other opposition organizations. At the same time, DS is not willing to support its former president yet, but the party remains open for that option after the election. DS agreed to form an electoral alliance with SDS, a party of DS' former president, Boris Tadić, who then called for restoration of the Democratic party. DJB and Dveri also announced a coalition in the run for the City Assembly seats.

On the other hand, the citizen organization Ne da(vi)mo Beograd, loosely translated as We Won't Let Belgrade D(r)own, that rose in 2015 from strong opposition of local population to controversial urban and architectural projects such as the Belgrade Waterfront, decided to participate in the local elections as a citizen group. This organization obtained support from similar civil groups in other European countries, notably from Barcelona's mayor, Ada Colau, followed by Yanis Varoufakis, and Zagreb is OURS movement from Croatia.

City Electoral Commission granted observer licences to representatives from Crta, Građani na straži, CeSID and Yucom. Apart from them, party representatives also observe the elections, as well as representatives from the Electoral Commission.

According to Serbian law, election silence begins at midnight, on 1 March, and will last until 4 March, when polls close. During this period, all campaigning is prohibited, in order to maintain a free voting environment.

== Electoral system ==
Voters in Belgrade determine the composition of the City Assembly, which in turn elects the Mayor. This means that the Mayor is only indirectly elected by the voters. Only parties which reach an electoral threshold of 5% may enter the Assembly, although this is waived for minority lists. The Mayor may or may not be a councilor of the Assembly. Assembly's composition is subject to a 4-year election cycle, and it has 110 seats, allocated using d'Hondt system.

In this election, there are 1.606.693 eligible voters, voting in 1.185 polls across the City's district.

== Electoral lists ==
The following are the electoral lists in the capital city so far proclaimed by the City Electoral Commission:

Ballot Number	Ballot Name
1	ALEKSANDAR VUČIĆ – Zato što volimo Beograd!
2	Dr VOJISLAV ŠEŠELJ – SRPSKA RADIKALNA STRANKA
3	IVICA DAČIĆ – Socijalistička partija Srbije (SPS), DRAGAN MARKOVIĆ PALMA – Jedinstvena Srbija (JS)
4	DA OSLOBODIMO BEOGRAD – Demokratska stranka (DS), Socijaldemokratska stranka (SDS), Nova stranka (NOVA) i Zelena ekološka partija – Zeleni (ZEP – Zeleni)
5	ALEKSANDAR ŠAPIĆ – GRADONAČELNIK
6	„Šta radite bre – Marko Bastać”
7	DOSTA JE BILO I DVERI – DA OVI ODU, A DA SE ONI NE VRATE
8	DR MILOŠ JOVANOVIĆ – DEMOKRATSKA STRANKA SRBIJE
9	ZELENA STRANKA SRBIJE
10	Beograd ima snage – ZAVETNICI
11	Dragan Đilas – Beograd odlučuje, ljudi pobeđuju!
12	„INICIJATIVA NE DAVIMO BEOGRAD - ŽUTA PATKA - ČIJI GRAD, NAŠ GRAD - Ksenija Radovanović”
13	RUSKA STRANKA – MILE MILOŠEVIĆ
14	PREDRAG MARKOVIĆ – POKRET OBNOVE KRALJEVINE SRBIJE
15	Dr. Muamer Zukorlić – Stranka pravde i pomirenja
16	ZELENA STRANKA – Kakav Beograd želiš? Misli
17	Republikanska stranka – Republikánus párt – Nikola Sandulović
18	JEDINSTVENA STRANKA PRAVDE (JSP) – JEKHUTNO ĆIDIMOS ČAĆIMASKO (JĆČ)
19	ZA BEOGRAD – BEOGONDOLA – SAOBRAĆAJ, URBANIZAM, TURIZAM – NOVA REŠENJA, KONKRETNI PROJEKTI – JOVAN RANĐELOVIĆ
20	NIJEDAN OD PONUĐENIH ODGOVORA
21	Građanska Stranka Grka Srbije – Vasilios Proveleggios
22	DOSTA JE BILO PLJAČKE, KORUPCIJE I LOPOVLUKA – Radulović Milorad
23	Liberalno demokratska partija – LDP – Čedomir Jovanović
24	Ljubiša Preletačević BELI – Zato što volimo BELOVGRAD

== Opinion polls ==
The highest percentage figure in each polling survey is displayed in bold, and the background shaded in the leading party's color. In the instance that there is a tie, then no figure is shaded. The lead column on the right shows the percentage-point difference between the two parties with the highest figures. When a specific poll does not show a data figure for a party, the party's cell corresponding to that poll is shown empty. Poll results use the date the fieldwork was done, as opposed to the date of publication. However, if such date is unknown, the date of publication will be given instead.

Pollster	Date	Sample size	SNS coalition	SPS & JS	DS coalition	DSS	PSG-NS-Đilas	Šapić list	SRS	Dveri & DJB		Others	Lead
Belgrade City Assembly election 2018	4 March 2018	N/A	44.99	6.13	2.25	1.12	18.93	9.01	2.34	3.89		11.34	26.06
Ipsos	1 Mar	?	44.1	5.8	3.9		13.4	7.9	4	3.9		8.3	30.7
Večernje Novosti	28 Feb	?	43.1	6.7	4.8		13.9	7.6	4.4	4.3		7.8	29.2
Informer	26 Feb	?	41.3	6.7	4.5		13	9.2	5.1	4.8		?	28.3
Alo	25 Feb	?	43	6.2	4.5		13.2	10.1	4	5.0		?	29.8
NSPM	26 Jan–3 Feb	1,200	38.1	6.2	3.9	1.0	19.0	15.2	3.8	5.0		7.8	23.8
Faktor plus	23–29 Jan	1,200	40.4	6.6	7.2	2.1	16.6	11.1	3.5	5.2		7.3	23.8
Ninamedia	3–16 Jan	1,208	37.2	7.5	9.6	1.4	14	9.2	6.1	9.9		5.1	23.2
NSPM	24 Dec–4 Jan	1,200	39.8		2.5		23.8	18.6	3.1	4.4		7.8	16
2018
Faktor plus	15–25 Dec	1,200	39.1	5.8	6.8		15.6	15	3.5	5.7		8.5	23.5
Faktor plus	28 Nov–5 Dec	1,000	39	5.9	5		16	16	2.5	5.3		10.3	23
NPSM	1–10 Nov	1,200	30.9	5.5	2.2		28.3	16.8	3.6	5.8		6.9	2.6
NPSM	25–30 Sep	1,100	33.8	5.5	2.3		27.7	16.1	3.6	4.8		6.2	6.1
2017
Belgrade City Assembly election 2014	16 March 2014	N/A	43.62	11.49	15.70	6.39	Did not exist	Did not exist	2.02	3.74	2.06	14.57	27.92

== Results ==
The following are the final results proclaimed by the City Electoral Commission:

Party	Votes	%	Seats	+/–
Serbian Progressive Party	366,461	45.74	64	+1
Movement of Free Citizens–People's Party–Serbian Left	154,147	19.24	26	New
Serbian Patriotic Alliance	73,425	9.16	12	New
Socialist Party of Serbia-United Serbia	49,895	6.23	8	-8
Enough is Enough-Dveri	31,682	3.95	0	0
Ne davimo Beograd	28,017	3.50	0	New
Serbian Radical Party	19,094	2.38	0	0
Ljubiša Preletačević Beli	19,013	2.37	0	New
Democratic Party, Social Democratic Party, New Party, Green Ecological Party - Greens	18,286	2.28	0	-22
Democratic Party of Serbia	9,084	1.13	0	-9
Serbian Party Oathkeepers	5,301	0.66	0	0
Movement for the Restoration of the Kingdom of Serbia	4,291	0.54	0	New
What are you doing, bre - Marko Bastać	3,604	0.45	0	New
Green Party of Serbia	3,349	0.42	0	New
Russian Party	3,040	0.38	0	0
Green Party	2,695	0.34	0	New
Liberal Democratic Party	1,955	0.24	0	0
None of the Above	1,498	0.19	0	0
Citizens' Party of Greeks in Serbia	1,493	0.19	0	New
Justice and Reconciliation Party	1,402	0.17	0	New
Enough Robbery, Corruption and Theft - Radulović Milorad	1,113	0.14	0	New
Republican Party - Republikánus párt - Nikola Sandulović	1,108	0.14	0	New
For Belgrade - Beogondola - Traffic, Urbanism, Tourism - New Solutions, Real Projects	823	0.10	0	New
United Justice Party - Jekhutno Ćidimos Čaćimasko	385	0.05	0	New
Total	801,161	100.00	110	–
Valid votes	801,161	98.41		
Invalid/blank votes	12,969	1.59		
Total votes	814,130	100.00		
Registered voters/turnout	1,594,141	51.07		
Source: Službeni List Grada Beograda

== Aftermath ==
Clear victory for the ruling party — SNS, meant that this party will determine the City's future mayor. Party leader, and President of Serbia, Aleksandar Vučić, stated that his party's cooperation in the City government with SPS will continue for another 4 years.

On the other hand, a once dominant party in Belgrade — DS, lost all its seats and won't be represented in the City Assembly for the first time since its inception. Its votes went largely to Đilas and Šapić, both of them former members of the party.

Nationalist parties and movements, such as SRS and Dveri were also heavily defeated in this election.
