= City Assembly of Belgrade =

Legislature of Belgrade, Serbia

City Assembly of Belgrade Скупштина града Београда Skupština grada Beograda
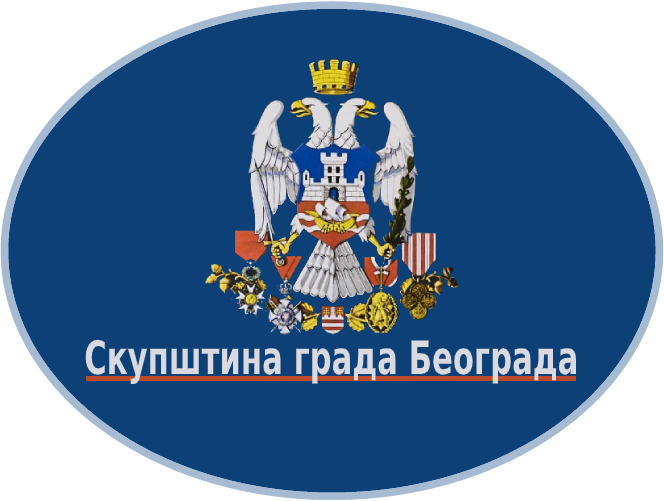
- Logo of the City Assembly

Type
- Type: Unicameral

Leadership
- President: Nikola Nikodijević, SPS since 21 June 2024
- Deputy President: Igor Jovanović, SDPS since 21 June 2024
- Secretary: Biljana Živković since 21 June 2024

Structure
- Seats: 110
- Political groups: Government (63): AV–BS (57); SPS–JS (6); Supported by (1): RS (1); Opposition (45): KP (21) (Note: Kreni-Promeni councillors verified their mandates at the constitutive session but walked out in protest over alleged electoral irregularities, announcing that they would donate their councillor fees to charity.); MI–SN (10); NPS–DS–NLS–EU (7); ZLF–PSG (6); Independent (1) (Note: Jelena Banjac, elected on the ZLF–PSG list, left the PSG and the ZLF–PSG councillor group on 12 November 2026.); Vacant (1): Vacant (1)
- Length of term: 4 years

Elections
- Voting system: Closed-list party-list proportional representation using the D'Hondt method with a 3% electoral threshold (not applied to ethnic minority lists); See Elections in Serbia
- Last election: 2 June 2024
- Next election: by 2028

Meeting place
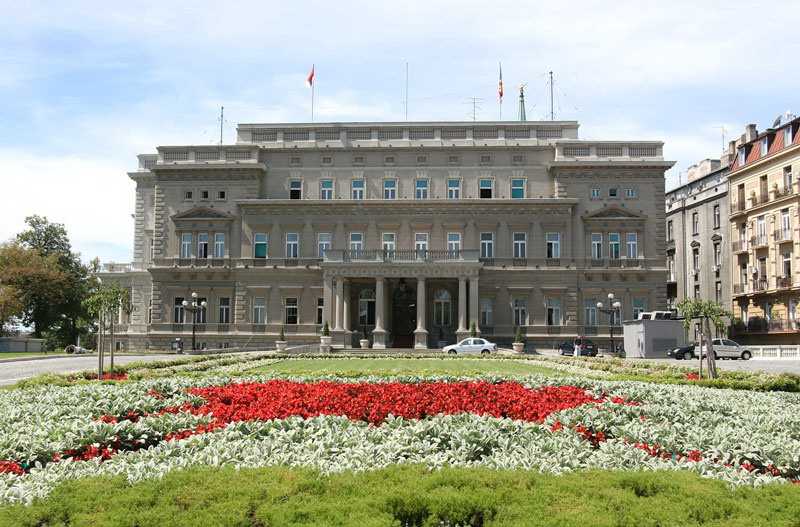
- Old Palace; 2 Dragoslava Jovanovića Street, Belgrade

Website
- beograd.rs

Constitution
- Statute of the City of Belgrade

The City Assembly of Belgrade (Serbian: Скупштина града Београда, romanized: Skupština grada Beograda) is the legislature of Belgrade, the capital of Serbia. It has 110 councillors, elected by proportional representation for four-year terms.

== Organisation ==
=== Presiding officers ===
The Assembly elects a president and a deputy president from among its councillors. On the proposal of the president, it also appoints a secretary and a deputy secretary for four-year terms; they oversee the professional work related to convening and holding sessions and manage the Assembly's administration. The current Assembly was constituted on 21 June 2024, when Nikola Nikodijević of the Socialist Party of Serbia was elected president for his fourth consecutive term.

Presiding officers of the City Assembly
Position	Name	Party
President	Nikola Nikodijević	Socialist Party of Serbia
Deputy President	Igor Jovanović	Social Democratic Party of Serbia
Secretary	Biljana Živković	Not a councillor
Deputy Secretary	Tatjana Vučenović	Not a councillor

== Latest election results ==
Party, alliance or citizens' group	Votes	%	+/–	Seats	+/–
Belgrade Tomorrow	387,326	53.79	+6.37	64	+10
Kreni-Promeni	129,868	18.03	New	21	New
We Choose Belgrade!	89,430	12.42	New	14	−29
We – Power of the People	59,805	8.31	New	10	New
Russian Party	8,509	1.18	+0.78	1	+1
For a Green Belgrade	8,485	1.18	New	0	New
We – Voice from the People	6,911	0.96	−4.54	0	−6
Enough is Enough	6,887	0.96	New	0	0
1 of 5 million	6,567	0.91	New	0	New
Dad, This is for You	5,485	0.76	+0.28	0	0
People's List – Key for Victory	4,213	0.59	−1.49	0	0
Roma Union of Serbia	3,325	0.46	New	0	New
Belgrade Is Our City	2,311	0.32	New	0	New
Belgrade is the World	974	0.14	−0.02	0	0
Total	720,096	100.00	–	110	–
Valid votes	720,096	98.09			
Invalid/blank votes	14,039	1.91			
Total votes	734,135	100.00			
Registered voters/turnout	1,602,150	45.82			
Source: City Election Commission

The previous election was held in 2023.

== See also ==
- Mayor of Belgrade
- President of the City Assembly of Belgrade
