= Milan St. Protić =

Serbian historian, politician and diplomat

His Excellency Milan St. Protić Милан Ст. Протић
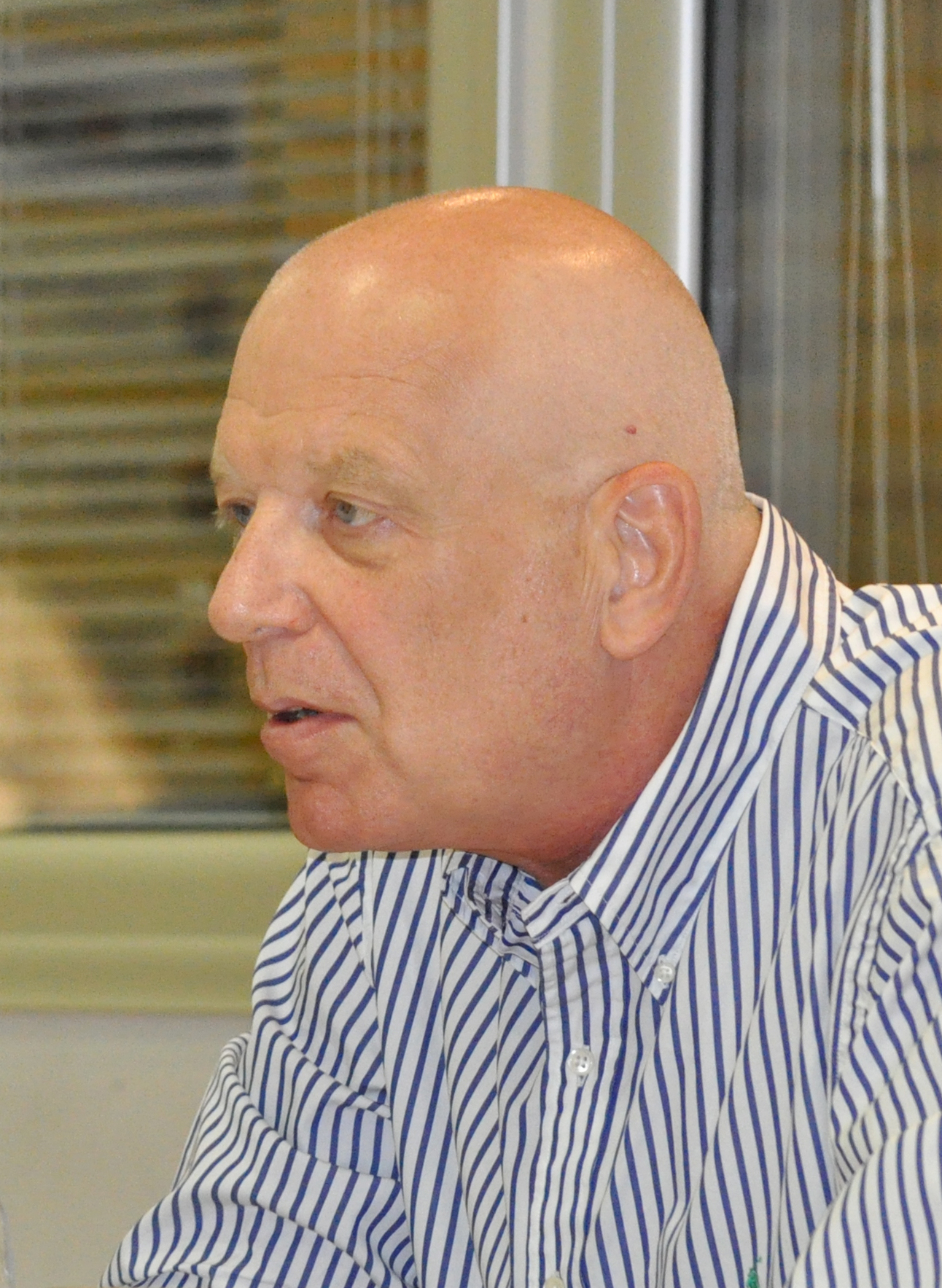
- Protić in 2017

Serbian Ambassador to Switzerland
- In office 27 January 2009 – September 2014
- Preceded by: Dragan Maršićanin
- Succeeded by: Snežana Janković

Yugoslav Ambassador to the United States
- In office 14 February 2001 – 23 August 2001
- Preceded by: Živorad Kovačević
- Succeeded by: Ivan Vujačić

69th Mayor of Belgrade
- In office 5 October 2000 – 14 February 2001
- Preceded by: Vojislav Mihailović
- Succeeded by: Dragan Jočić (acting)

Personal details
- Born: 28 July 1957 (age 69) Belgrade, PR Serbia, FPR Yugoslavia
- Party: DSS (1992); NS (1998–2000); DHSS (2001–2010)
- Education: University of Belgrade, LL.B. 1980; Univ. of California, Santa Barbara, M.A. 1982, Ph.D. 1987

Milan St. Protić (Serbian Cyrillic: Милан Ст. Протић; born 28 July 1957) is a Serbian historian, politician and diplomat who served as the Ambassador of the Federal Republic of Yugoslavia to the United States, Switzerland and Liechtenstein. He was also the Mayor of Belgrade in 2000/01.

== Early life and education ==
He was born in a prominent Serbian family of politicians and intellectuals. His great grandfather Stojan Protić was Serbian statesman and the Prime Minister of Yugoslavia (1918–1920). His grandfather Milan St. Protić was the Governor of the Yugoslav Central Bank (1939–1940) and was the member of the Yugoslav cabinet (1941). His father was a renowned Yugoslav sportswriter and FIFA official.

Protić graduated from the University of Belgrade's Law School in 1980, but was not allowed to pursue an academic career for political reasons. Leaving the country, he continued graduate studies in the History department at the University of California, Santa Barbara where he received M.A. (1982) and Ph.D. (1987).

Upon his return to Yugoslavia, Milan St. Protić entered the Institute for Balkan Studies as a Research Fellow. He was a visiting professor at UC Santa Barbara (1991–1992). He also gave lectures at universities in Thessaloniki, Paris, Cambridge, London, Harvard, Washington, D.C., and Toronto. He is the author of several books about Serbian and Yugoslav 19th and 20th century history.

== Political career ==
From 1991, St. Protić took an active part in the opposition movement against the regime of Slobodan Milošević. He became one of the leading figures of the opposition movement and a member of its leadership in 1998.

On October 5, 2000, he was elected Mayor of Belgrade as the first official-elect of the new democratic government.

In February 2001, Milan St. Protić was appointed Ambassador to the United States, but was recalled after six months due to public criticism of the Yugoslav President Vojislav Koštunica and his policies. In following years he was the Deputy Chairman of the Christian Democratic Party of Serbia (DHSS).

In January 2009, Protić was appointed Ambassador to Switzerland and Liechtenstein.

== Personal life ==
Milan St. Protić is married and father of three daughters. He is a self-described Serbian nationalist and Serbian Orthodox Christian.

== See also ==
- Mayor of Belgrade

Political offices
Preceded by Vojislav Mihailović	Mayor of Belgrade; 2000–2001	Succeeded by Dragan Jočić (acting)
