= United States–Yugoslavia relations =

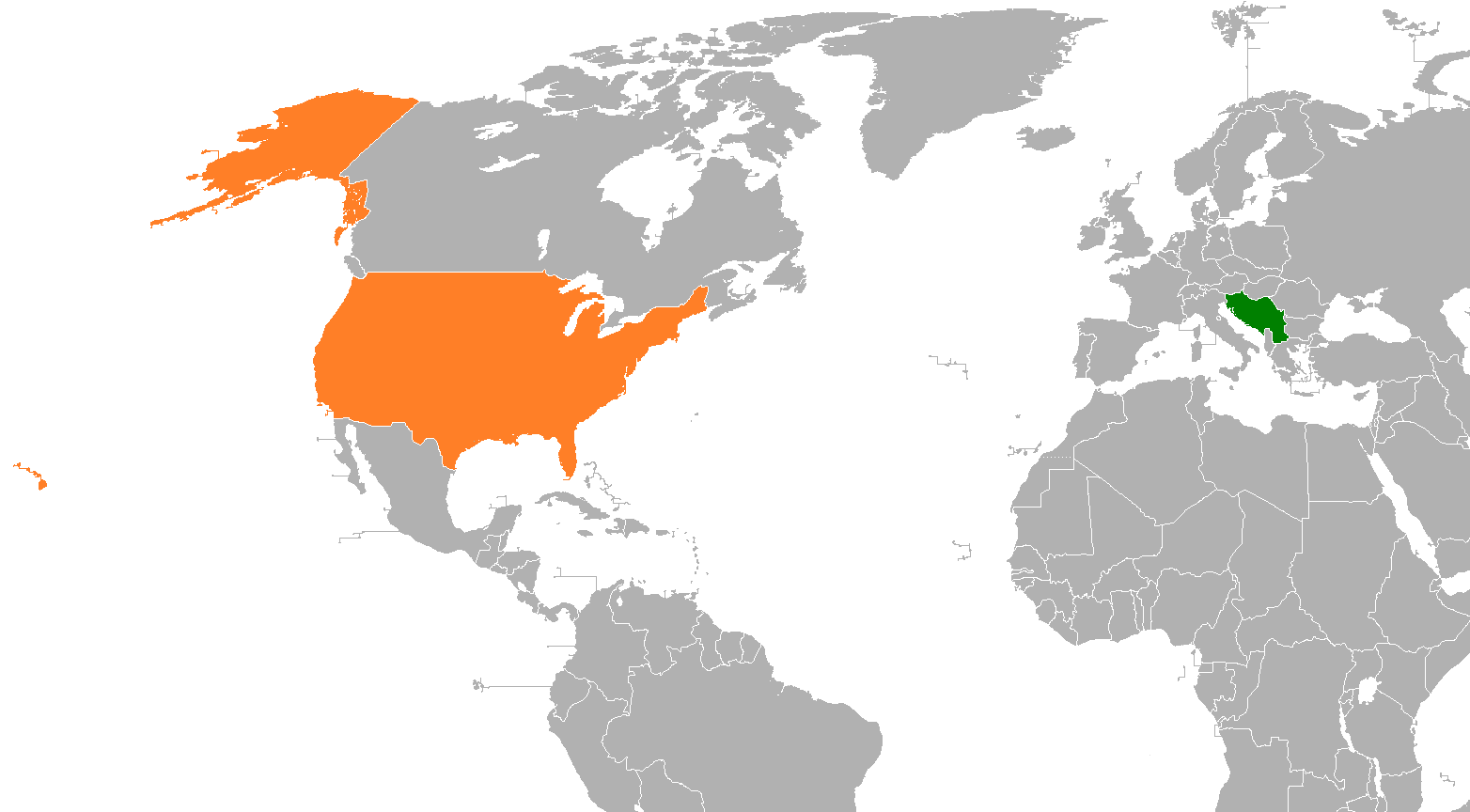

- United States: Yugoslavia

Diplomatic mission
- Embassy of the United States, Belgrade: Embassy of Yugoslavia, Washington D.C.

United States–Yugoslavia relations were the historical foreign relations between the United States and both the Kingdom of Yugoslavia (1918–1941) and Socialist Federal Republic of Yugoslavia (1945–1992). During the existence of the SFRY, relations oscillated from mutual ignorance, antagonism to close cooperation, and significant direct American engagement. The United States was represented in Yugoslavia by its embassy in Belgrade and consulate general in Zagreb.

== History ==
=== Kingdom of Serbia ===
United States–Kingdom of Yugoslavia relations
- United States: Yugoslavia

Diplomatic mission
- Embassy of the United States, Belgrade,: Embassy of Yugoslavia, Washington D.C.

The United States recognized the Kingdom of Serbia as a sovereign nation on October 14, 1881, with the signing of consular and commercial agreements. On November 10, 1882, U.S. Consul General Eugene Schuyler presented his credentials to the government of Serbia. At this time, the American Legation in Belgrade was established, though Schuyler was resident at Athens. U.S. and Serbian officials first made overtures to establish diplomatic relations in 1867, but it was not until 1881, three years after the country gained its independence from the Ottoman Empire, that the United States officially recognized the Kingdom of Serbia.

On October 14, 1881, both countries signed two treaties. The first was the Treaty on Commercial Relations to facilitate and develop commercial relations between the two countries signed by U.S. Chargé d’Affaires and Consul-General at Bucharest Eugene Schuyler and Serbian Minister of Foreign Affairs Čedomilj Mijatović. The second treaty was the Convention on Rights, Privileges, and Immunities of Consular Officers. This agreement defined and regulated the rights, immunities, and privileges of each state’s consular officers. On October 25, 1901, the United States and the Kingdom of Serbia signed a Treaty on Extradition in Belgrade. The treaty promoted justice and confirmed friendly relations between the two nations, and was negotiated by U.S. Minister Charles Spencer Francis and Serbian Minister of Foreign Affairs Michel V. Vouïtch.

=== Interwar period ===
The Kingdom of Yugoslavia was created in the aftermath of the World War I under the influence of the Fourteen Points self-determination ideas by the Woodrow Wilson administration. The United States was the first country to diplomatically recognize Yugoslavia.

=== World War II ===
During World War II in Yugoslavia, the United States initially supported the royalist Yugoslav government in exile. When Nazi Germany invaded Yugoslavia in the spring of 1941, the United States decisively supported the Chetniks in the first years of the war. This however changed once British sources recognized Yugoslav Partisans as the only significant resistance movement which will rise to become the most effective anti-Axis resistance movement during the war.

=== Initial postwar years ===
In the initial period after the war relations between the two countries were poor with Yugoslavia being perceived as the closest Soviet ally, and the country in which Communist party gained power without any significant Soviet support. This phase lasted in a short period after the end of the World War II in 1945 and before the beginning of the Cold War in 1947. This period was characterized by Soviet conciliatory diplomacy towards the West and much more belligerent Yugoslav foreign policy involved in issues such as the Free Territory of Trieste and Greek Civil War. Relations were further strained when two USAF C-47 Skytrain cargo aircraft were shot down over Yugoslavia in the space of two weeks. At the time, relations with United States were given lower priority to country's relations with United Kingdom.

=== Relations after 1948 ===
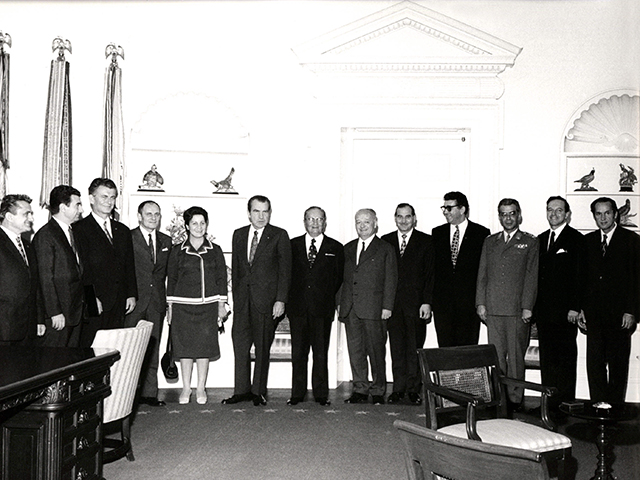
Group photo with Yugoslav delegation.

The 1948 Tito-Stalin split represented the major turning point in the relations of United States and the new socialist republic. Yugoslavia first requested assistance from the United States in summer 1948. The Truman administration decided to provide substantial aid, loans and military assistance to Yugoslavia despite some concerns caused by earlier relations. Omar Bradley was also an outspoken supporter of providing aid and improving relations with Yugoslavia, stating in an address to Congress on 30 November 1950 that "In the first place, if we could even take them out of the hostile camp and make them neutral, that is one step. If you can get them to act as a threat, that's a second step. if you can get them to actively participate on your side, that is an even further step and then, of course, if you had a commitment, where their efforts were integrated with those of ours on the defence, that would still be a further step." This marked the beginning of US military aid to a communist nation in order to counter Soviet ambitions in the region, leading to greater strives in United States–Yugoslavia relations. Tito received US backing in Yugoslavia's successful 1949 bid for a seat on the United Nations Security Council, against Soviet opposition. In 1949, the United States provided loans to Yugoslavia, and in 1950 the loans were increased and followed by large grants and military aid. On 29 November 1950, Yugoslav Republic Day, president Harry S. Truman asked Congress to endorse the Yugoslav Emergency Relief Act. Even though the Yugoslavs initially avoided asking for military aid believing that it would be a pretext for a Soviet invasion, by 1951 Yugoslav authorities became convinced that Soviet attack was inevitable and Yugoslavia was included in the Mutual Defense Assistance program. The United States recognized strategic importance of an independent and successful socialist Yugoslavia as a subversive model for other states which were part of the Eastern Bloc.

Yugoslav Chief of the General Staff Peko Dapčević (left) on an official visit to the US, greeted by US Army Chief of Staff J. Lawton Collins upon arrival at Washington, D.C., March 1953.

As part of its advocacy in the Non-Aligned Movement, Yugoslavia criticized the US war in Vietnam and US support for Israel.

The Yugoslav diplomacy dealt successfully with the shifts in the focus of American policy from Kennedy's "Grand Design," Johnson's "building bridges" appeal, Nixon's personal diplomacy, to Carter's focus on the human rights. Yugoslavia pursued a highly independent foreign policy and maintained leadership of the international Nonaligned movement that created a competing ideology and challenged the two superpowers.

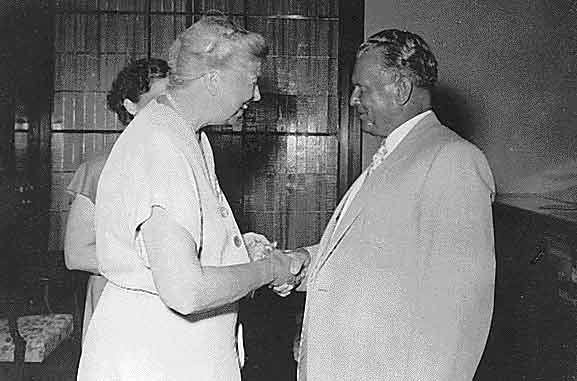
Eleanor Roosevelt and Josip Broz Tito in 1953

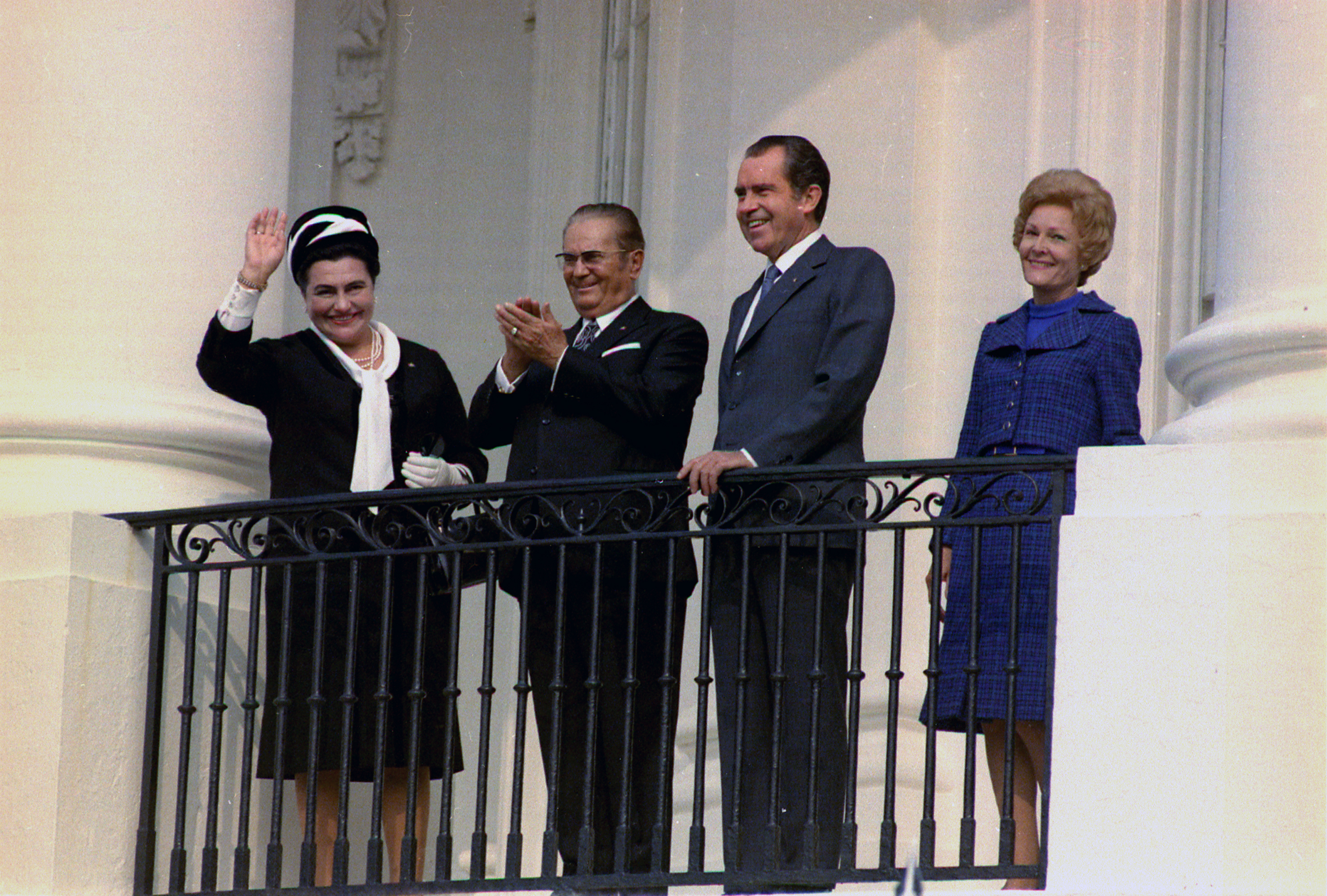
President and Mrs. Broz, President and Mrs. Nixon overlooking arrival ceremony on the South Lawn from the White House.

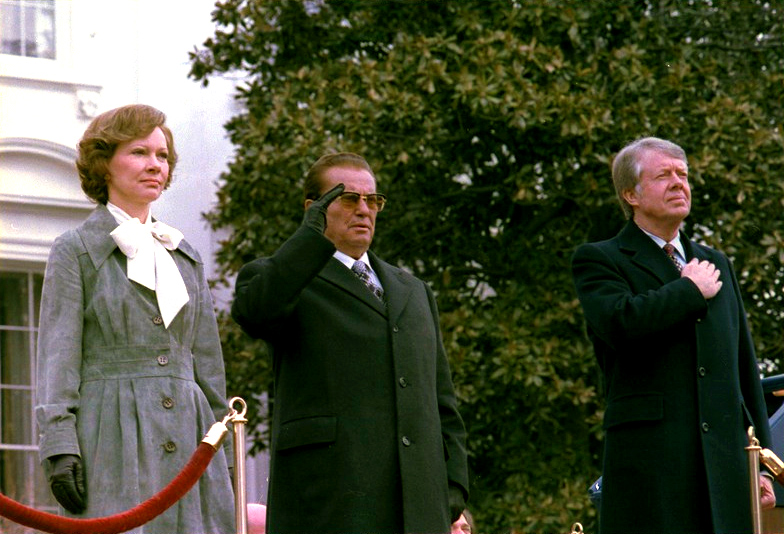
Tito with Rosalynn & Jimmy Carter during Tito's third state visit to USA in 1978.

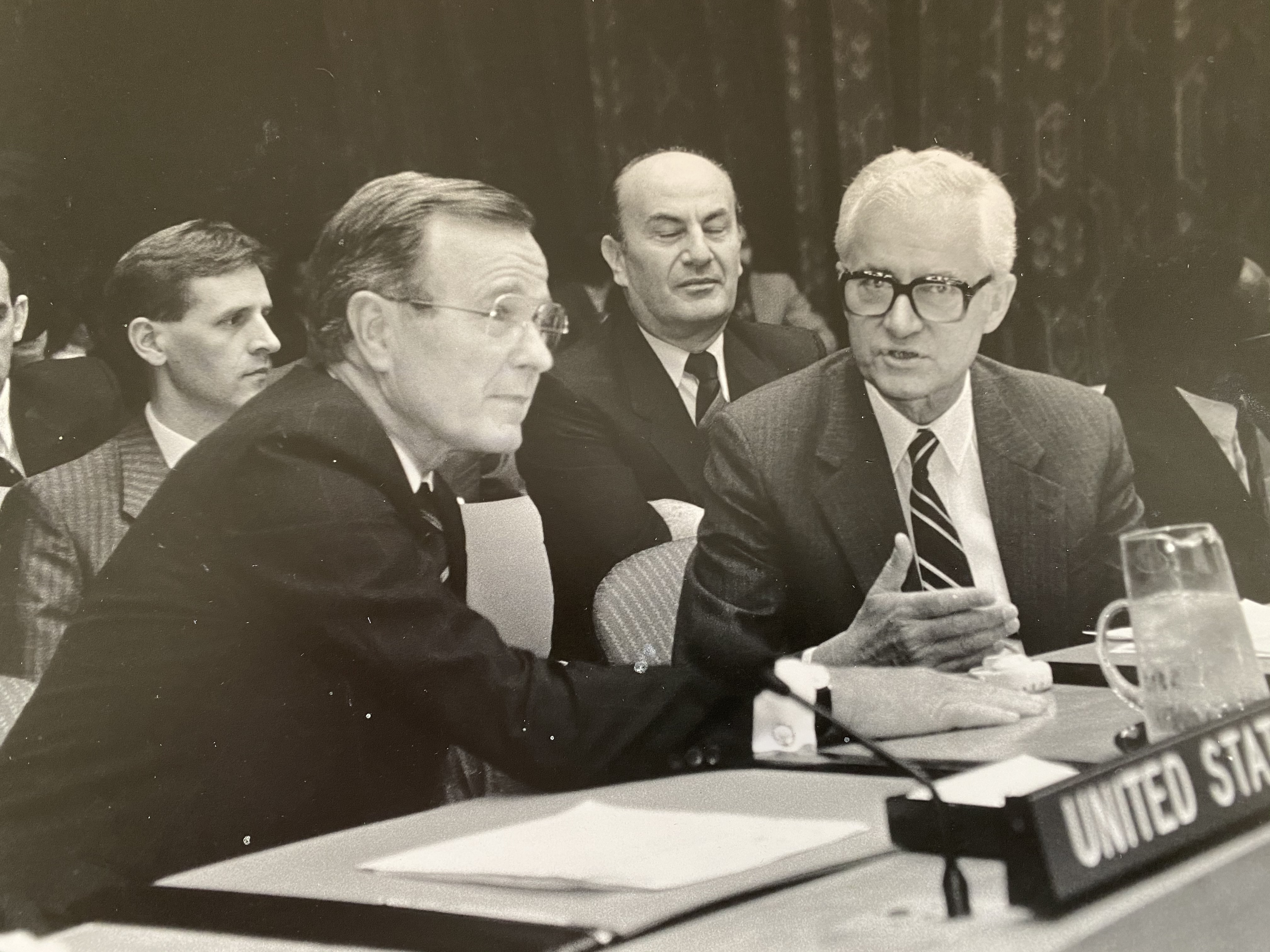
Yugoslav representative Dragoslav Pejić talking to George H. W. Bush at the United Nations Security Council meeting on 14 July 1988.

=== Yugoslav crisis, breakup and wars ===
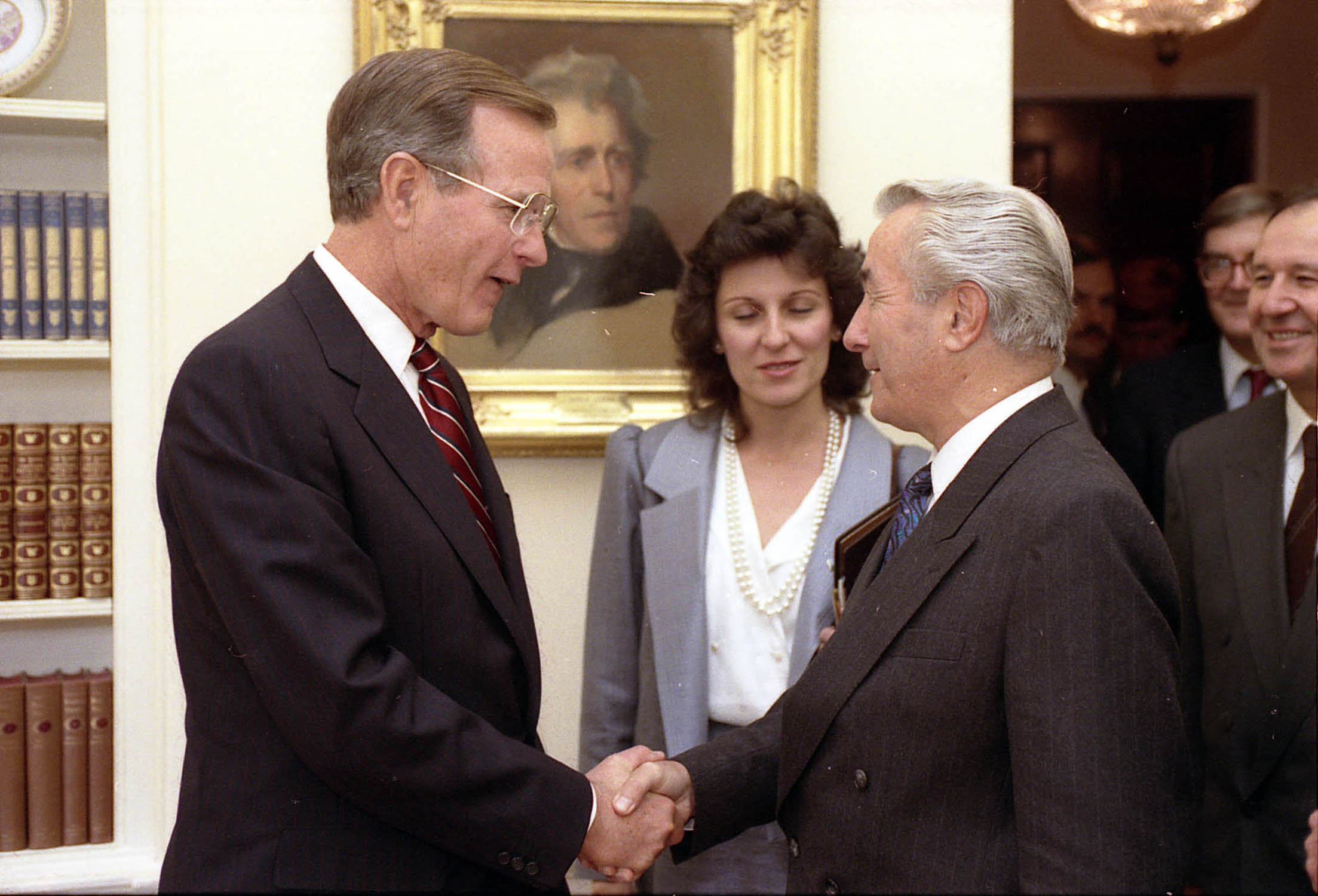
President George H. W. Bush and Ante Marković in 1989.

In the initial stage of the Yugoslav crisis and the breakup of Yugoslavia at the end of the Cold War the United States were strong advocates of Yugoslav integrity. At the same time, Washington believed the crisis was an issue for Europe to resolve. Failure of the European Community and subsequently the European Union to deal with the Yugoslav Wars led to significant American involvement in the region. In this process Presidency of Bill Clinton provided security guarantees and efforts for smaller and weaker former Yugoslav republics of Bosnia and Herzegovina and Macedonia. This led to some friction with Croatia as well as significant tension with FR Yugoslavia (which US rejected to recognize as the sole successor to Socialist Yugoslavia) and Bosnian Serbs which escalated in 1995 after Operation Deliberate Force and in 1999 due to the NATO bombing of Yugoslavia and continued until the overthrow of Slobodan Milošević.

== See also ==
- Yugoslavia and the Non-Aligned Movement
- Yugoslavia–European Communities relations
- Bosnia and Herzegovina–United States relations
- Croatia–United States relations
- Kosovo–United States relations
- Montenegro–United States relations
- North Macedonia–United States relations
- Serbia–United States relations
- Slovenia–United States relations
- Yugoslav Americans
  - Bosnian Americans
  - Croatian Americans
  - Macedonian Americans
  - Serbian Americans
  - Slovene Americans
  - Montenegrin Americans
