= Leposava Milićević =

Serbian politician

Leposava Milićević (Serbian Cyrillic: Лепосава Милићевић; born 12 August 1950) is a former politician in Serbia. She was Serbia's Minister of Health from 1994 to 2000 and also briefly served as minister of religious affairs in the Federal Republic of Yugoslavia. Milićević was a member of the Yugoslav Left (Jugoslovenska Levica, JUL).

== Early life and private career ==
Milićević was born in Bela Crkva, Autonomous Province of Vojvodina, in what was then the People's Republic of Serbia in the Federal People's Republic of Yugoslavia. She graduated from the University of Belgrade Faculty of Medicine in 1976, worked in Kladovo in 1977–78, and then moved to Požarevac, where she was head of general medical service at the health centre before entering political life in 1994.

== Politician ==
=== Minister of Health ===
==== First Marjanović administration (1994–98) ====
Milićević was appointed as health minister in the first government of Mirko Marjanović on 18 March 1994, at a time when Serbia was facing a variety of challenges against the backdrop of the Yugoslav Wars of the 1990s. In October 1994, she remarked that the easing of international sanctions against Yugoslavia was reducing shortages of medical supplies, saying, "the health institutions in Serbia at present have heating fuel enough for a month or two, and some have sufficient quantities to last them through the winter." When the Republic of Serbian Krajina fell in August 1995, Milićević despatched medical crews on the road from Prijedor to Serbia's border to provide medical assistance to Serb refugees fleeing the area.

Milićević faced several instances of labour unrest during her tenure as health minister. In May 1996, she attempted to avert a threatened strike by announcing a thirty per cent wage increase for health workers. She later charged that Serbia's drug producers were damaging the sector by refusing to extend credits for longer than 180 days. She urged longer-term loans, saying that Serbia could turn to international firms if this did not occur.

In October 1996, international medical experts met in Belgrade to announce the creation of the first international teaching centre for (in the terminology that was prevalent at the time) "genital and transsexual surgery." Milićević indicated that the Serbian government would provide full support to the initiative.

The JUL contested the 1997 Serbian parliamentary election as a junior partner in an electoral coalition led by the Socialist Party of Serbia (Socijalistička partija Srbije, SPS). Milićević received the lead position on the coalition's list in the Požarevac division and was elected when the list won three out of six available mandates. (From 1992 to 2000, Serbia's electoral law stipulated that one-third of parliamentary mandates would be assigned to candidates from successful lists in numerical order, while the remaining two-thirds would be distributed amongst other candidates on the lists at the discretion of the sponsoring parties. Milićević automatically received a mandate.) The SPS alliance won the election, although it fell short of a majority.

==== Second Marjanović administration (1998–2000) ====
The SPS formed a new Serbian administration in February 1998 in coalition with the JUL and the far-right Serbian Radical Party (Srpska radikalna stranka, SRS). Marjanović continued to serve as prime minister, and Milićević was retained in the role of health minister. During the early period of the Kosovo War, she was a part of Serbia's delegation in negotiations with representatives of the Albanian community of Kosovo and Metohija.

In February 1999, Serbian authorities seized control of the Yugoslavian unit of ICN Pharmaceuticals Inc. Milan Panić, the company's chairman and chief executive officer, described the move as "theft of a grand order." Milićević defended it as a "logical" act, saying that the company had paid only fifty million dollars of a $270 million contract signed in 1990. (The company disputed this charge).

Milićević also served on the managing board of the University of Belgrade during this period.

===== NATO bombing of Yugoslavia =====
Milićević was responsible for overseeing Serbia's health sector during the 1999 NATO bombing of Yugoslavia. In late February, she ordered all medical facilities in Serbia to prepare for war and to send home those patients who did not require continued hospital treatment. In April 1999, during the midst of the bombing, she condemned North Atlantic Treaty Organization (NATO) spokesperson Jamie Shea for alleging that Serb forces were forcing ethnic Albanians to provide blood for injured Serbs. She was quoted as saying, "NATO is not only a monstrous killing machine but also a lying machine." Later in the same month, she accused NATO of causing a "humanitarian catastrophe" through its bombing activities, causing "killings and serious injuries of civilians, severe destructions of natural environment and deteriorated nutrition of the population."

On 19 May 1999, a NATO missile destroyed the University Hospital Center Dr Dragiša Mišović, killing three civilian patients as well as seven soldiers of the Yugoslav Army who were in the hospital. NATO later stated that the missile was aimed at a nearby military target but went off course. In the immediate aftermath of the bombing, Milićević was quoted as saying, "They make so many mistakes, I couldn't believe that it is not by purpose."

After the conclusion of the bombing campaign, Milićević and another Serbian cabinet minister led the first convoy of Kosovo Serb refugees back to Pristina. She later said that medical conditions in Kosovo were falling to disastrous levels, charging that in several jurisdictions Serbian health workers had been replaced by ethnic Albanians with no experience in the field.

=== Yugoslavian cabinet minister ===
Milićević's term as health minister ended on 13 July 2000, and she was appointed to the newly created position of minister of religious affairs in Momir Bulatović's federal Yugoslavian administration. Bulatović's government described the appointment as evidence of its commitment to promote cooperation with religious authorities. During her tenure in office, Milićević was received in an official capacity by Patriarch Pavle, leader of the Serbian Orthodox Church.

She was dismissed from office following the 2000 Yugoslavian general election, in which Yugoslavian president Slobodan Milošević was defeated by Vojislav Koštunica, a watershed event that prompted large-scale changes in Serbian and Yugoslavian politics. Milićević was herself a candidate for the City Assembly of Belgrade in the concurrent 2000 Serbian local elections, losing to future mayor Nenad Bogdanović in Stari Grad's second division. She did not run in the subsequent 2000 Serbian parliamentary election, and her term in the Serbian parliament ended when the new assembly convened in January 2001.

== Since 2000 ==
After the fall of the Milošević regime, Milićević was charged with abuse of office. It was reported in 2014 that no verdict had been issued due to statute of limitations issues.

== Electoral record ==
=== City Assembly of Belgrade ===
2000 City of Belgrade election Stari Grad Division II
Nenad Bogdanović (incumbent)	Democratic Opposition of Serbia (Affiliation: Democratic Party)	Elected
Vasilije Jeremić	Serbia Together	
Leposava Milićević	Socialist Party of Serbia–Yugoslav Left (Affiliation: Yugoslav Left)	
Aleksandar Milutinović (incumbent for New Belgrade)	Serbian Renewal Movement	
Nenad Čoporda	Serb Party	
Nemanja Šarović	Serbian Radical Party	
