= Aleksandar Milutinović =

Serbian politician (1948–2013)

Aleksandar Milutinović (Serbian Cyrillic: Александар Милутиновић; 16 October 1948 – 18 September 2013) was a politician and administrator in Serbia. He was a prominent member of Belgrade's city government from 1997 to 2000, a member of the National Assembly of Serbia from 1997 to 2001, and briefly Serbia's transport minister in 2000–01 after the fall of Slobodan Milošević's administration. Milutinović was a member of the Serbian Renewal Movement (Srpski pokret obnove, SPO).

== Private career ==
Milutinović was born in Belgrade, in what was then the People's Republic of Serbia in the Federal People's Republic of Yugoslavia. He was a graduated engineer.

== Politician ==
The SPO contested the 1993 Serbian parliamentary election as part of a larger Democratic Movement of Serbia (Demokratski pokret Srbije, DEPOS) coalition. Milutinović appeared in the twenty-fourth position on the coalition's list in the Belgrade division. The list won eleven mandates, and he was not awarded a mandate. (From 1992 to 2000, Serbia's electoral law stipulated that one-third of parliamentary mandates would be assigned to candidates on successful lists in numerical order, while the remaining two-thirds would be distributed amongst other candidates at the discretion of sponsoring parties or coalitions. Milutinović could have received an optional mandate, though in the event he did not.)

=== Belgrade city government ===
The SPO later formed an alliance called Zajedno (English: Together) with the Democratic Party (Demokratska stranka, DS) and the Civic Alliance of Serbia (Građanski savez Srbije, GSS). Milutinović was elected to both the City Assembly of Belgrade and the New Belgrade municipal assembly as a Zajedno candidate in the 1996 Serbian local elections. The Serbian government, led by Milošević's Socialist Party of Serbia (Socijalistička partija Srbije, SPS), did not initially recognize the victories of Zajedno is several municipalities, leading to extended protests that lasted into early 1997. The opposition's victory was eventually recognized in most disputed areas, including the city of Belgrade (although not in New Belgrade, where the SPS retained power).

When Zajedno officially formed government in Belgrade in February 1997, Milutonović was appointed as a vice-president of the city's executive council (i.e., effectively a deputy premier of the city government). He was given specific responsibility for economy and finance.

Zajedno subsequently broke up in Belgrade, and Milutinović became a vocal critic of DS mayor Zoran Đinđić, accusing him of violating joint accords and campaigning against the SPO. Đinđić was dismissed as mayor on 30 September 1997, and the SPO became the sole party in the city's government, governing with informal support in the assembly from the SPS and the Serbian Radical Party (Srpska radikalna stranka, SRS).

Milutinović oversaw Belgrade's public transit sector during his time in the city's government. In February 2000, he complained that the Serbian government had not responded to the city's request for a fare increase from five to eight dinars.

He ran for re-election to the Belgrade assembly in Stari Grad's second constituency in the 2000 Serbian local elections and was defeated by future mayor Nenad Bogdanović, the candidate of the Democratic Opposition of Serbia (Demokratska opozicija Srbije, DOS).

=== Parliamentarian and cabinet minister ===
Milutinović received the second position on the SPO's list for New Belgrade in the 1997 Serbian parliamentary election and was awarded an optional mandate when the list won two seats. The SPS and its allies won the election, and the SPO served in opposition.

Slobodan Milošević was defeated by DOS candidate Vojislav Koštunica in the 2000 Yugoslavian presidential election, an event that prompted wide-ranging changes in the governments of Serbia and Yugoslavia. A transitional Serbian government comprising representatives of the SPS, DOS, and SPO was established in October 2000, and Milutinović was included in the administration as transport minister.

Serbia's election laws were subsequently changed such that the entire country was counted as a single electoral district and all mandates were assigned at the discretion of successful parties and coalitions, irrespective of the numerical order of candidates. Milutinović received the 117th position on the SPO's list, which was mostly alphabetical; the list did not cross the electoral threshold to win representation in the assembly. His term in government ended on 25 January 2001.

=== Administrator ===
The SPO contested the 2003 Serbian parliamentary election in an alliance with New Serbia (Nova Srbija, NS), and Milutinović appeared on their combined list in the fifty-third position. The list won twenty-two seats, and the SPO again participated in Serbia's coalition government after the election. Milutinović was not returned to the assembly, but on 25 March 2004 he was appointed as general director of the publicly owned company Jat Airways. In this role, he planned to revise a prior agreement signed by the Milošević government with Airbus and to purchase new planes from Boeing, although this plan was not successful. JAT went into receivership on 17 February 2005, and Milutinović was removed as director.

== Death ==
Milutinović died on 18 September 2013.

== Electoral record ==
=== City Assembly of Belgrade ===
2000 City of Belgrade election Stari Grad Division II
Nenad Bogdanović (incumbent)	Democratic Opposition of Serbia (Affiliation: Democratic Party)	Elected
Vasilije Jeremić	Serbia Together	
Leposava Milićević	Socialist Party of Serbia–Yugoslav Left (Affiliation: Yugoslav Left)	
Aleksandar Milutinović (incumbent for New Belgrade)	Serbian Renewal Movement	
Nenad Čoporda	Serb Party	
Nemanja Šarović	Serbian Radical Party	
