= Branislav Belić =

Serbian politician

- Бранислав Белић
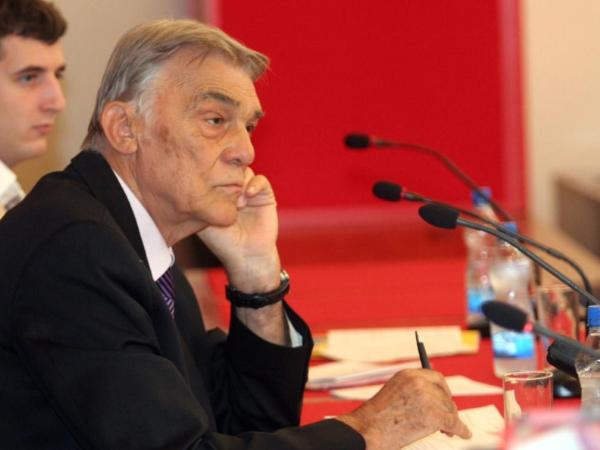

Acting Mayor of Belgrade
- In office 21 July 2008 – 19 August 2008
- Preceded by: Zoran Alimpić
- Succeeded by: Dragan Đilas

Personal details
- Born: 10 March 1932 Belgrade, Kingdom of Yugoslavia
- Died: 17 July 2016 (aged 84) Belgrade, Serbia
- Party: DS
- Education: University of Belgrade

Branislav Belić (Serbian Cyrillic: Бранислав Белић, pronounced [brǎnislaʋ bělit͡ɕ] or [běːlit͡ɕ]; 10 March 1932 – 17 July 2016) was a Serbian politician.

He was an Acting Mayor of Belgrade following the 2008 election. He served as an interim Chairman of the Assembly as the oldest member. Previously this seat, which is also a seat of the acting mayor, was held by Zoran Alimpić. Acting mayors were necessary in the period until the election of the new one, due to the death of the elected mayor Nenad Bogdanović. His term ended with election of Dragan Đilas.

He graduated from the University of Belgrade's Law School and has worked in the legal profession as well as foreign trade. He was an elected councilor and president of the Municipal Assembly of Savski Venac and councilor of the City of Belgrade in several terms, and he was a member of the National Assembly of Serbia and member of the Assembly of the State Union of Serbia and Montenegro.

He died on 17 July 2016 in Belgrade.

== See also ==
- Mayor of Belgrade

Political offices
Preceded by Zoran Alimpić	Acting Mayor of Belgrade; July 2008 – 19 August 2008	Succeeded by Dragan Đilas
