= Dragan Jočić =

Serbian lawyer and politician

- Драган Јочић
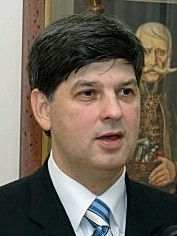
- Jočić in December 2006.

Minister of Internal Affairs
- In office 3 March 2004 – 7 July 2008
- Prime Minister: Vojislav Koštunica
- Preceded by: Dušan Mihajlović
- Succeeded by: Ivica Dačić

Mayor of Belgrade (Acting)
- In office 13 February 2001 – 1 June 2001
- Preceded by: Milan St. Protić
- Succeeded by: Radmila Hrustanović

Personal details
- Born: 7 September 1960 (age 66) Belgrade, PR Serbia, FPR Yugoslavia
- Party: Democratic Party of Serbia (1992–2014); Independent (2014–present)
- Education: University of Belgrade Faculty of Law
- Occupation: Politician
- Profession: Lawyer

Dragan Jočić (Serbian Cyrillic: Драган Јочић, born 7 September 1960) is a Serbian lawyer and politician. He served as the Minister of Internal Affairs from 2004 until 2008 in the cabinet of Prime Minister Vojislav Koštunica.

He was a member of the Democratic Party of Serbia (DSS) since its inception up until 2014. He also served as the party vice-president and has been a member of the party's executive board since its founding. From 1992 to 1997, he was an MP in the Serbian parliament. He was also a city council member and has been a member of the Belgrade City Council since 2000.

== Early life and education ==
Jočić is of Montenegrin Serb descent, his family originating from Martinići, a village near Danilovgrad, Montenegro. He graduated from the University of Belgrade's Law School. After graduation, he started private law practice.

== Car accident ==
On 25 January 2008, around 11:30pm CET, Jočić was severely injured in a car crash when a government-issued, chauffeur-driven Mercedes-Benz ML 500 that he was riding in hit a dog on the Belgrade-Niš highway near the town of Velika Plana. After hitting the animal, the driver, Mirko Damnjanović lost control of the vehicle, which then careened into a mid-highway divider, crossed into the oncoming traffic lanes, spun several times, and landed in a ditch. Jočić was then airlifted to Belgrade's Banjica orthopedic clinic with spinal injuries where an emergency surgery was performed early Saturday morning on 26 January 2008. Driver Damnjanović was rushed to Belgrade's Emergency Center where he also had an emergency surgery. It was initially reported that they're both in stable conditions following their surgeries. However, it soon became clear Jočić's condition remained life-threatening and a lot more serious than initially predicted and he was put back into intensive care where reanimation measures were performed. On 27 January 2008, a team of Russian neurosurgeons from Burdenko Institute arrived to Belgrade in order to help with Jočić's post-surgery recovery process. He then spent three weeks at the Orthopädische Universitätsklinik Balgrist in Zürich, Switzerland, before coming back to Serbia on 11 April 2008 and continuing the rehab at the Dr Miroslav Zotović Rehabilitation Clinic in Belgrade. In January 2009, his condition was reported as "much improved". However, as of October 2010, Jočić is still unable to walk and has been released from the rehab clinic (after spending two and a half years there) for further rehabilitation at home.

In November 2015, in his first interview after the accident, given to NIN, Jočić said that the country's authorities have failed to protect him and give him needed help after the accident. He also stated that: "the length and painful way in which I try to accomplish what belongs to me, so that I can live, offends dignity".

== Controversy ==
After being named Minister of Internal Affairs on 3 March 2004, several newspapers reported that as a 21-year-old Jočić was directly involved in a 1981 kiosk robbery for which he was convicted to a 6-month conditional jail sentence. He confirmed the stories when asked about them. He later stated that this was his "only mischief as a youth" and that "everybody knows that Dragan Jočić is a good man". Both claims became a popular catchphrase among those unsympathetic towards his and his party's policies.

In September 2004, Jočić became the target of criticism for allegedly trying to influence Dejan Milenković Bagzi, one of the accused in the Prime Minister Zoran Đinđić murder trial who became a protected witness (svedok saradnik). The accusation of meddling in the trial came after the transcripts of Bagzi's apparent phone call with his attorney Biljana Kajganić were published. In them, attorney Kajganić allegedly tells her client that she got him the protected witness status after talking to Jočić and BIA chief Rade Bulatović, but that in return he (Bagzi) has to "admit to organizing the killing of Momir Gavrilović in 2001 on orders from Ljubiša "Čume" Buha". Jočić strenuously denied the charges that he in any way influenced the trial and added that transcripts were forged.

Jočić was blasted again for having a private meeting with the chief suspect for the murder of the Prime Minister Đinđić just minutes after he was arrested. The meeting lasted several hours. Jočić confirmed this, but denied that he broke the law by stating that this was the safest option.

He was also accused by some Serbian press outlets of failing to adequately protect the Belgrade's Bajrakli Mosque during riots caused by March 17, 2004 ethnically motivated violence in Kosovo. Jočić reacted by sacking the chief of Belgrade police force even though transcripts of phone calls which they had during the riot clearly proved that he strictly insisted that no force be used against protestors. That eventually led to the significant damage to the mosque.

Political offices
Preceded by Dušan Mihajlović	Minister of the Interior; 2004–2008	Succeeded by Ivica Dačić
Preceded by Milan St. Protić	Mayor of Belgrade (Acting); 2004	Succeeded by Radmila Hrustanović
