= Embassy of the United States, Belgrade =

Diplomatic mission of the US in Serbia

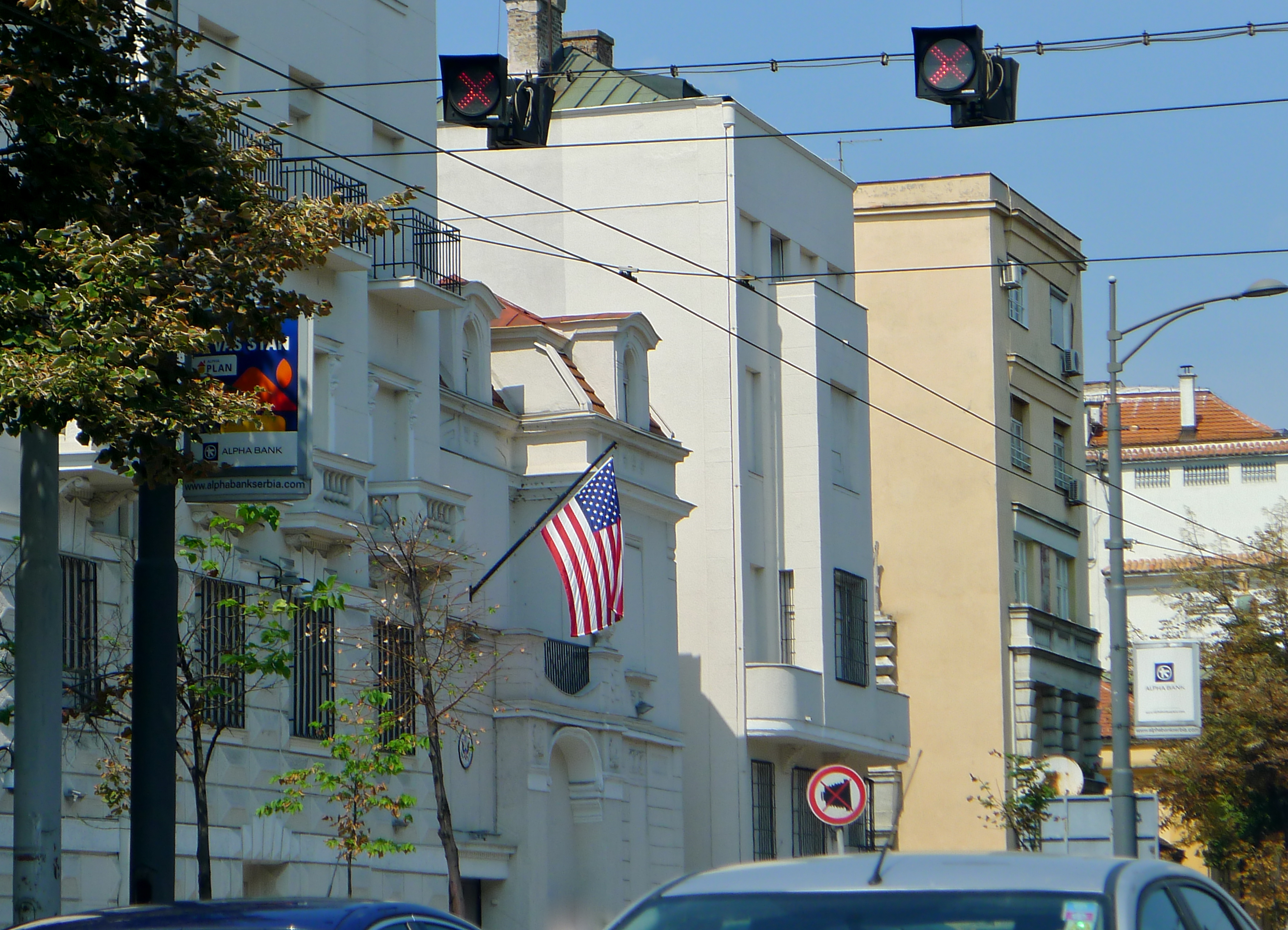
- Former embassy in Knez Miloša street
- Location: Belgrade, Serbia
- Address: Bulevar kneza Aleksandra Karađorđevića 92
- Coordinates: 44°46′19″N 20°27′11″E
- Website: https://rs.usembassy.gov

The Embassy of the United States in Belgrade is the diplomatic mission of the United States of America in Serbia. Serbia, being at a crucial geographic and strategic juncture in the Balkans, has maintained its significance to U.S. foreign policy.

== History ==
Originally, the United States had relations with Yugoslavia until 1992, which consisted of several republics including Serbia. Following the declaration of the Federal Republic of Yugoslavia (FRY) by Serbia and Montenegro in April 1992, the United States refused to recognize the FRY as the successor state to the Socialist Federal Republic of Yugoslavia. Consequently, the U.S. Ambassador was recalled from Belgrade, although the embassy continued its functions under a Chargé d'Affaires ad interim.

During the Kosovo War and on the eve of the NATO bombing of Yugoslavia, on 23 March 1999, the United States severed diplomatic relations and closed the Embassy in Belgrade. Relations and full diplomatic ties resumed in November 2000, following an exchange of letters between U.S. President Bill Clinton and Yugoslavia President Vojislav Koštunica that reestablished full diplomatic relations between the two countries. The Embassy reopened in May 2001, and the formal appointment of an Ambassador to Serbia followed later that year on November 26, with William Dale Montgomery taking up the post.

On 21 February 21 2008, Serbian protesters set fire to the embassy, due to U.S. support for the 2008 Kosovo declaration of independence.

On 1 July 2013, after three years of construction, new 14,000 square metres (150,000 sq ft) embassy building was opened in Dedinje neighborhood in Belgrade.

== See also ==
- Embassy of Serbia, Washington, D.C.
- List of ambassadors of the United States to Serbia
- Serbia–United States relations
