= Radmila Hrustanović =

Serbian politician (born 1952)

- Радмила Хрустановић
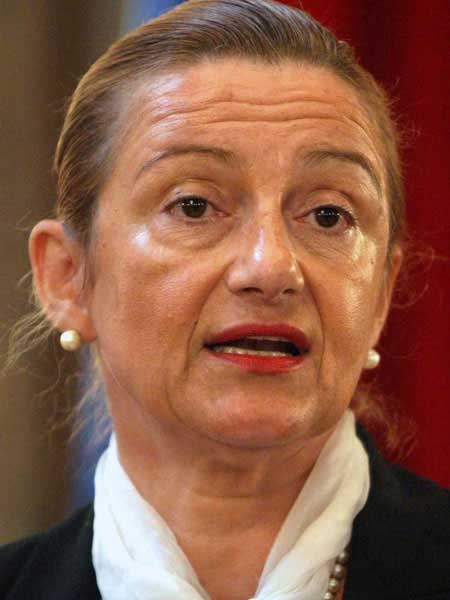

Serbian Ambassador to Slovakia
- In office 13 June 2011 – 18 April 2013
- Preceded by: Danko Prokić
- Succeeded by: Šani Dermaku

70th Mayor of Belgrade
- In office 1 June 2001 – 3 October 2004
- Preceded by: Dragan Jočić (acting)
- Succeeded by: Nenad Bogdanović

Personal details
- Born: November 25, 1952 (age 73) Belgrade, PR Serbia, FPR Yugoslavia
- Party: Civic Alliance of Serbia (1992–2004); Democratic Party (2004–2013)
- Education: University of Sarajevo

Radmila Hrustanović (Serbian Cyrillic: Радмила Хрустановић, pronounced [rǎdmila xrǔstanoʋit͡ɕ] or [xrustǎːnoʋit͡ɕ]; born 25 November 1952 in Belgrade, Yugoslavia) is a Serbian politician.

== Biography ==
She finished primary and high schools in Belgrade and went on to graduate from the University of Sarajevo's Faculty of Law. She had been a practising attorney-at-law for eight years, and was employed with the Federal Executive Council for 14 years.

From 1996 to 2000, she was a member of the Executive Board of the Zvezdara Municipal Assembly. From 2000-2001, she was a member of the Executive Board of the City of Belgrade Assembly in charge of property-right, building land and information affairs. At the same time, she was the Acting Director of Studio B Public Broadcasting Enterprise (for seven months). From June 2001 to November 2004, she was the Chairwoman of the City of Belgrade Assembly.

She was the Mayor of the City of Belgrade between 2001 and 2004, and the Deputy Mayor from 2004 to 2007. With the death of Mayor Nenad Bogdanović on 27 September 2007, her deputy post also expired. With an election of the new Mayor Dragan Đilas she became the assistant to the mayor, however he dismissed her in March 2010. In June 2011 she became an Ambassador Extraordinary and Plenipotentiary of the Republic of Serbia to Slovakia.

She was a member of both the Reform Party of Yugoslavia and Civic Alliance of Serbia, however in October 2004, she quit her membership in the Civic Alliance of Serbia and joined Democratic Party. She also helped foundation of Women's Political Network of Serbia in February 2000.

== See also ==
- Mayor of Belgrade

Political offices
Preceded by Dragan Jočić (Acting)	Mayor of Belgrade; 2001 – 2004	Succeeded by Nenad Bogdanović
