= Serbia–United States relations =

- Serbia: United States

Diplomatic mission
- Embassy of Serbia, Washington, D.C.: Embassy of the United States, Belgrade

Envoy
- Ambassador Dragan Šutanovac: Chargé d'affaires Alexander Titolo

Serbia and the United States maintain diplomatic relations established in 1882. From 1918 to 2006, the United States maintained relations with the Kingdom of Yugoslavia, the Socialist Federal Republic of Yugoslavia (SFRY), and the Federal Republic of Yugoslavia (FRY) (later Serbia and Montenegro), of which Serbia is considered shared (SFRY) or sole (FRY) legal successor.

At the end of the 19th century, the United States sought to take advantage of the Ottoman Empire's retreat from the Balkans by establishing diplomatic relations with the region's newly emerged nation states, among which was Serbia. The two countries were allies during World War I. After the war, Serbia united with Montenegro and territories previously held by Austria-Hungary to create a unified South Slavic state that would come to be known as Yugoslavia. The country had diplomatic relations with the United States up to the start of World War II. During World War II in Yugoslavia, the United States initially supported the Serbian royalist Chetniks over their rivals, the communist Partisans. The Chetniks ultimately lost out to the Partisans and Yugoslavia became a single-party communist state with Partisan leader Josip Broz Tito at its head. In the immediate aftermath of the war, Yugoslavia and the United States had little diplomatic relations. The end of the war also resulted in the mass emigration of refugees from Yugoslavia, many of whom were Serbs that ended up moving to the United States. This helped create the first major Serbian diaspora in the United States. Some of the Serbian refugees who settled in the United States after World War II were anti-communist exiles who attempted to undermine Tito during the Cold War, using the United States as a venue for their anti-communist aims.

During the breakup of Yugoslavia, the United States engaged in both combative and economic conflict, particularly with Serbia, known at the time as the Federal Republic of Yugoslavia (one of socialist Yugoslavia's successor states). The United States imposed sanctions and spearheaded a NATO bombing campaign against Yugoslavia in 1999. During this period, another wave of Serbian emigration ensued, and many Serbian refugees moved to the United States. In the 2000s, diplomatic relations between the United States and Yugoslavia were restored, but were changed when Montenegro seceded in 2006, after which Serbia was the successor state to continue relations previously held by the Federal Republic of Yugoslavia. Kosovo unilaterally declared independence from Serbia in 2008, a move which the US recognized.

== History ==
=== Early Serbian immigration to the United States ===
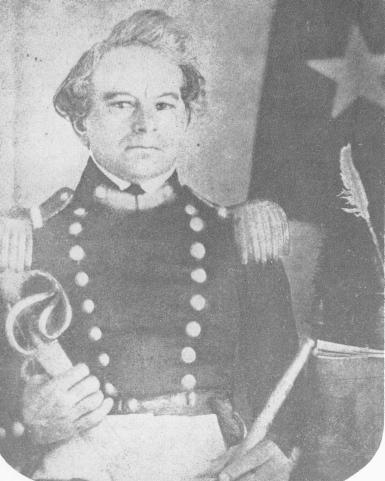
George Fisher, Serbian immigrant, early leader of the Republic of Texas

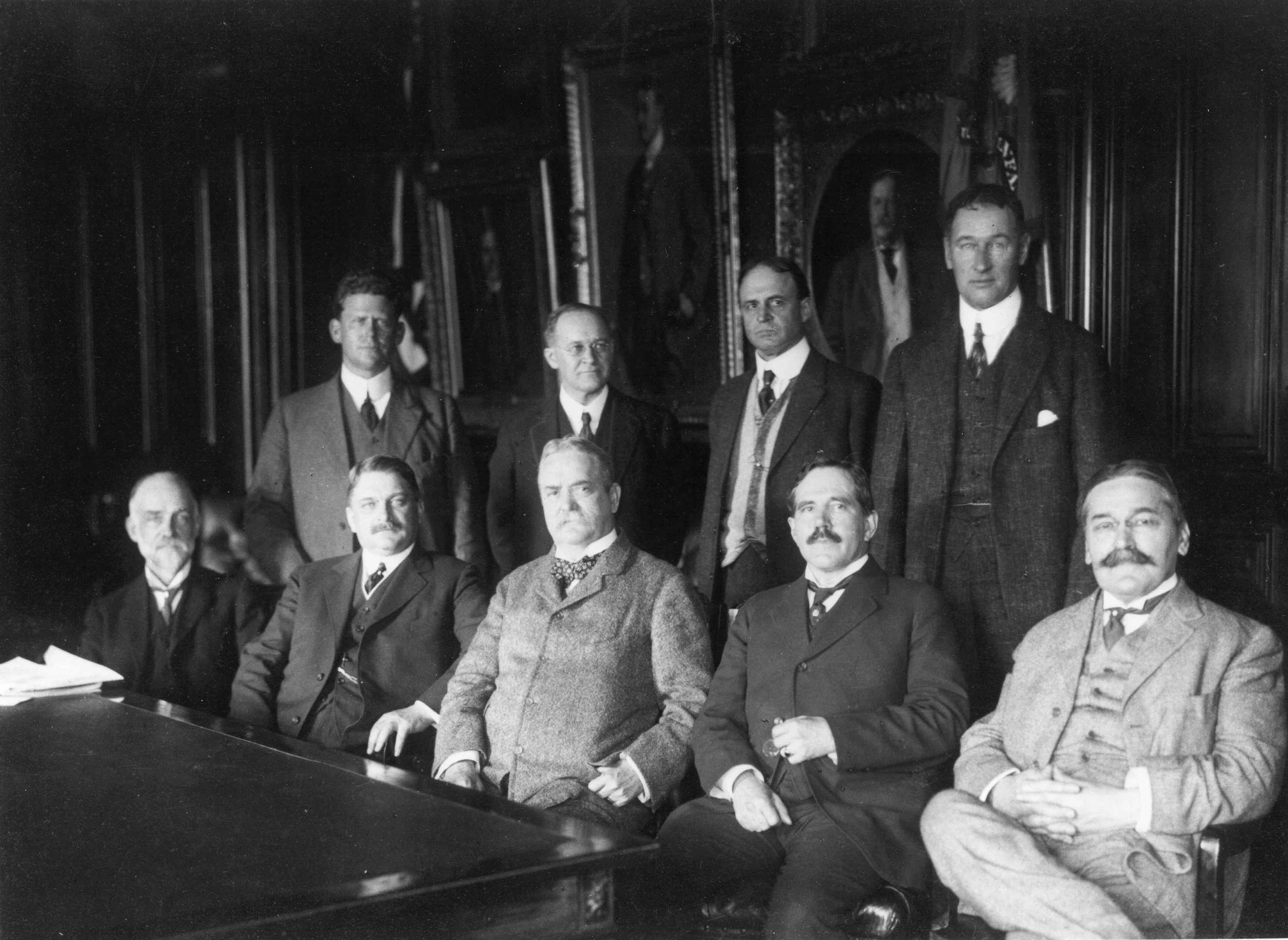
Mihajlo Pupin (seated first from right), honorary consul of Serbia in the United States, at the first meeting of the NACA, 1915

The first Serbian settlers to the United States came to Louisiana in the 1830s, largely from the Bay of Kotor and the Dalmatian coast. Further settlers were attracted by the California gold rush of 1848. One of the first Serb immigrants was the settler George Fisher, who fought in the Texan Revolution and was appointed a judge, having previously served in the Serbian revolutionary forces during the First Serbian Uprising. Towards the latter part of the 19th century, Serbs sought opportunities in the northeast, midwest and far west, which became the centers of immigration by the 1940s.

=== Relations between the Kingdom of Serbia and the United States ===
Diplomatic relations between the then-Kingdom of Serbia and the United States were established in the 19th century. In 1879, the Serbian Consulate-General in New York was opened. On February 3, 1882, the Serbian Parliament adopted a contract and convention of diplomatic relations between the Kingdom of Serbia and the United States, given by King Milan Obrenović. The United States Senate adopted both documents on July 5, 1882 without debate or amendments. On November 10, 1882, Eugene Schuyler became the first United States ambassador in Serbia.

In 1894, a visit of a group of 40 US tourists to Belgrade during their European tour attracted significant public attention in Serbian capital. The guests were welcomed by the US consul and numerous citizens after which they visited major attractions and spent an evening in a garden with music.

=== Relations between the Kingdom of Yugoslavia and the United States ===
==== US role in defining borders of the Kingdom of Serbs, Croats, and Slovenes ====
After the participation of the United States in World War I, US president Woodrow Wilson issued his Fourteen Points as a list of prioritized negotiations to end the war. Wilson's tenth point asserted that the peoples living in Austria Hungary should independently decide their fates after the war, directly contradicting the British government's post-war vision of a surviving Austria-Hungary. Wilson's eleventh point more specifically involved Serbia, explicitly stating that Serbia be guaranteed open access to the Adriatic Sea. During the negotiations for the Treaty of Versailles, the United States were represented by a delegation which was heavily involved in defining the borders for the new Kingdom of Serbs, Croats, and Slovenes. During the process of defining new borders, The Kingdom of Serbia selected Jovan Cvijić to show maps to the American delegation in an effort to persuade them to endorse the acquisition of Baranya, east Banat, and other regions previously ruled by Austria Hungary, Bulgaria, and Romania. Likewise, the American delegation also faced the lobby of Serbia's neighboring countries, and for the most part endorsed the allocation of Baranya to Hungary and most of Banat to Romania, in contrast to Cvijić's proposals.

==== Cultural exchange ====
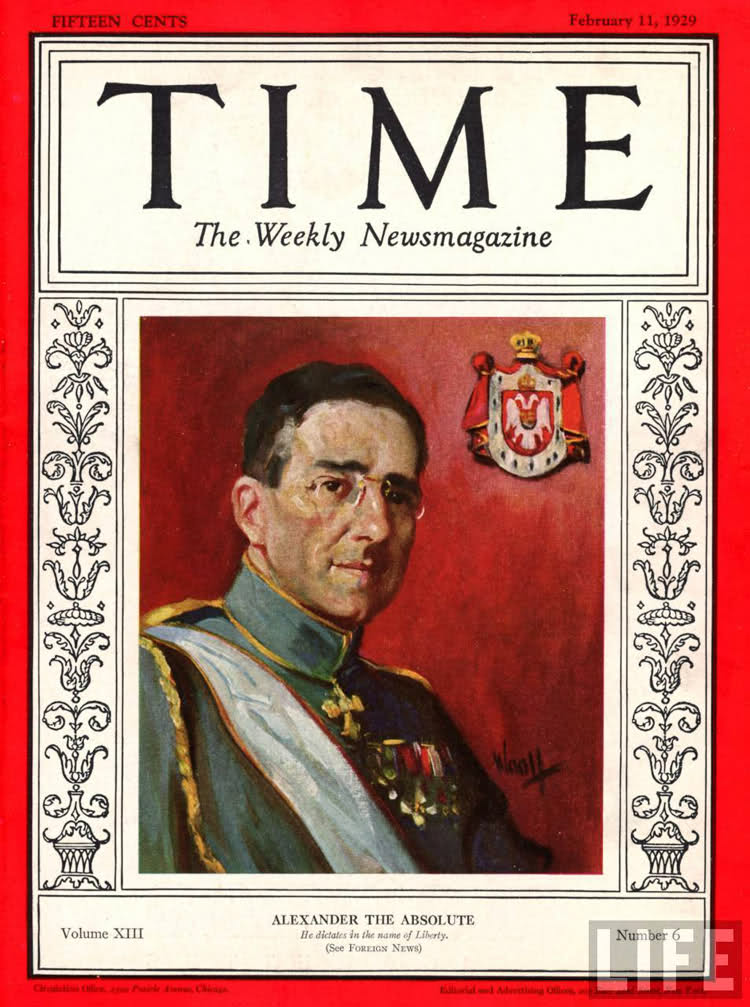
King Alexander I of Yugoslavia on the cover of Time on February 11, 1929

Serbian students began studying in the US after World War I. The International Serbian Educational Committee was founded by professor Rosalie Slaughter Morton in 1919, and it was soon made official by the Ministry of Education. Morton was the first woman professor of gynecology in New York and she sought to "pay her respect, gratitude and admiration" for Serbia's role in the war. Total of 61 students (mostly from modern-day Serbia) were enrolled in the first generation. Various American colleges were made available for free studying to Serb students as a sign of good will and partnership. Such actions were only one aspect of generally good relations between the two nations on all fields at the time.

American films made up over 50 percent of foreign showings in Yugoslav cinemas in the 1930s, with Charlie Chaplin being a favourite of the Belgrade public. During the same period, Jazz music became popular and several American musicians played in Belgrade, such as Arthur Rubinstein.

=== US support of Serbian monarchists during World War II ===
During the World War II in Yugoslavia, the United States initially supported the royal government of Yugoslavia. When the Nazis invaded Yugoslavia in the spring of 1941, the United States provided large amounts of support to the Chetniks in the first years of the war. This support took place in the form of extensive clandestine relations between the Office of Strategic Services and Chetniks with William Donovan's administration. Such cooperation was highlighted by complex operations such as Operation Halyard, in which several hundred American pilots were rescued by Chetniks.

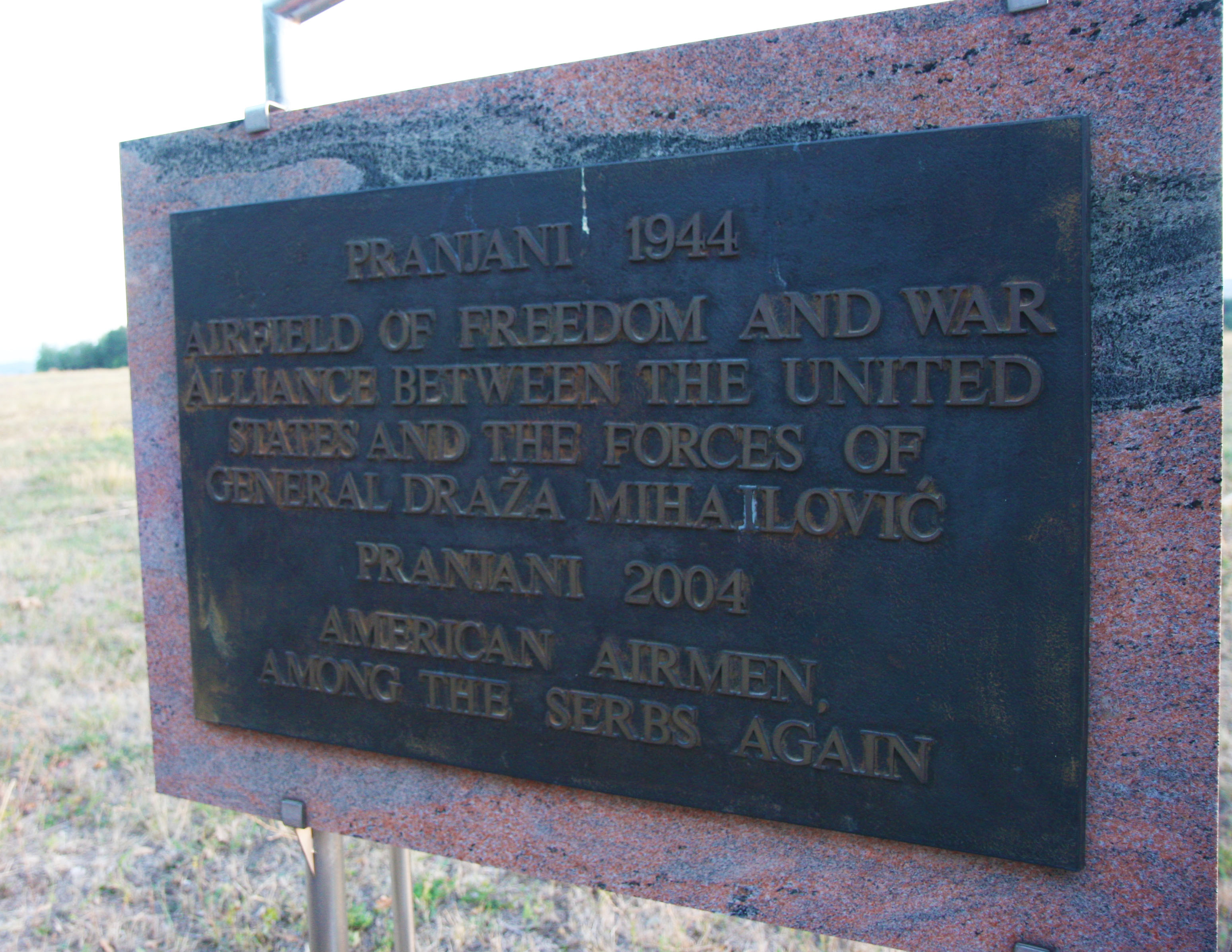
Memorial plaque for Operation Halyard in Pranjani

However, OSS support for the Chetniks was compromised by the British government's MI6 policy of favoring the Yugoslav Partisans instead of the Chetniks. In 1943, the US government's support for the Chetniks over the Yugoslav Partisans was such that president Franklin D. Roosevelt discussed with Winston Churchill in a private conversation that he imagined that Yugoslavia's boundaries would be completely redrawn into three separate states, with Peter II being the monarch of an independent Serbian kingdom at the end of the war. The USAF and the RAF began bombing Belgrade in April 1944 when they came to the conclusion that the Nazi occupation could not be removed by Serbian resistance alone.

The United States intelligence circles gradually conceded its influence on Yugoslav guerrilla operations to the British. At the end of the war, President Harry S. Truman dedicated a Legion of Merit to Chetnik leader Draža Mihailović, but the award wasn't revealed publicly until 2005.

=== Cold War relations ===
After the end of World War II, the Federal People's Republic of Yugoslavia (FNRJ) was formed. One of the first diplomatic contacts made with the new communist government was the US Department of State's request for the US Army to testify at the Mihailović trial. However, the request was shunned and early relations between the United States and the government of Josip Broz Tito became strained, as American diplomats were furious over Mihailović's execution in 1946. Relations degraded even further a month later, when two USAF C-47 Skytrain cargo aircraft were shot down over Yugoslavia in the space of two weeks. More USAF aircraft were shot down over Yugoslavia up to 1948. As a result, U.S. senator Thomas Dodd staunchly opposed American financial aid to Tito's government, even saying that "Tito had bloodied hands." In one of Josip Broz Tito's early visits to the United States, protesters in San Pedro drowned an effigy of him. Following the Second World War into 1961, the United States operated a Military Assistance Advisory Group (MAAG) and many Yugoslavian officers received American training. Along with receiving many American weapons, Yugoslavia received US$600 million in military aid.

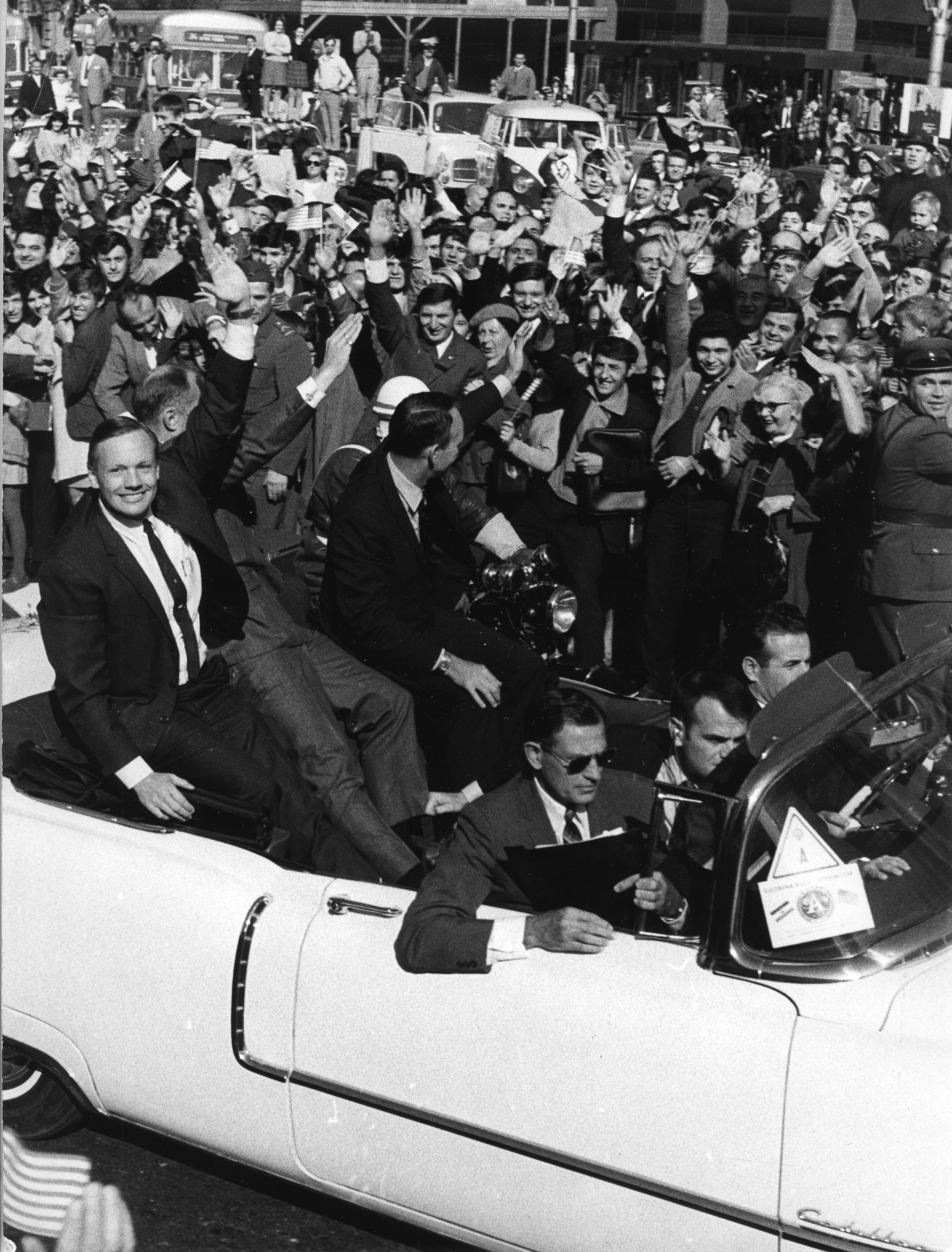
The Apollo 11 crew in Belgrade, 1969

The communist governments in Europe deferred to Stalin and rejected Marshall Plan aid from the United States in 1947. At first, Tito went along and rejected the Marshall plan. However, in 1948 Tito broke decisively with Stalin on other issues, making Yugoslavia an independent communist state. Yugoslavia then requested American aid. American leaders were internally divided, but finally agreed and began sending money on a small scale in 1949, and on a much larger scale 1950–53. The American aid was not part of the Marshall Plan.

Yugoslavia began opening more diplomatic dialogue to western nations after the Tito–Stalin split, which assured that Yugoslavia was not to become a member of the Warsaw Pact. Pan American World Airways launched direct flights from New York to Belgrade in 1963. On 1 January 1967, Yugoslavia was the first communist state to open its borders to all foreign visitors and abolish visa requirements. The regular commercial air travel between the United States and Yugoslavia then saw the launching of JAT Yugoslav Airlines flights to the United States, effectively competing with Pan Am. Trade opportunities reopened between the United States and Yugoslavia, and American businesses began exporting to Yugoslavia. Likewise, by the 1980s Yugoslavia was even exporting many of its manufactured automobiles from Zastava Automobili's assembly line in Kragujevac to the United States. U.S. president Jimmy Carter discussed issues regarding Palestine and Egypt with Tito and referred to him as a "great world leader". Subsequently, the Reagan administration presented their policies towards Yugoslavia in a Secret Sensitive 1984 National Security Decision Directive NSDD 133. "U.S. Policy towards Yugoslavia." A censored version declassified in 1990 elaborated on NSDD 54 on Eastern Europe, issued in 1982. The latter advocated "efforts to expand U.S. economic relations with Yugoslavia in ways which will benefit both countries" serving as "a useful reminder to countries in Eastern Europe of the advantages of independence from Moscow".

==== Serbian anti-communists in the United States ====
For much of the socialist period, the United States was a haven for many Serbian anti-communists living outside Yugoslavia. On 20 June 1979, a Serbian nationalist named Nikola Kavaja hijacked American Airlines Flight 293 from New York City with the intention of crashing the Boeing 707 into League of Communists of Yugoslavia headquarters in Belgrade. The aircraft, however, landed in Shannon, Ireland, where Kavaja was arrested.

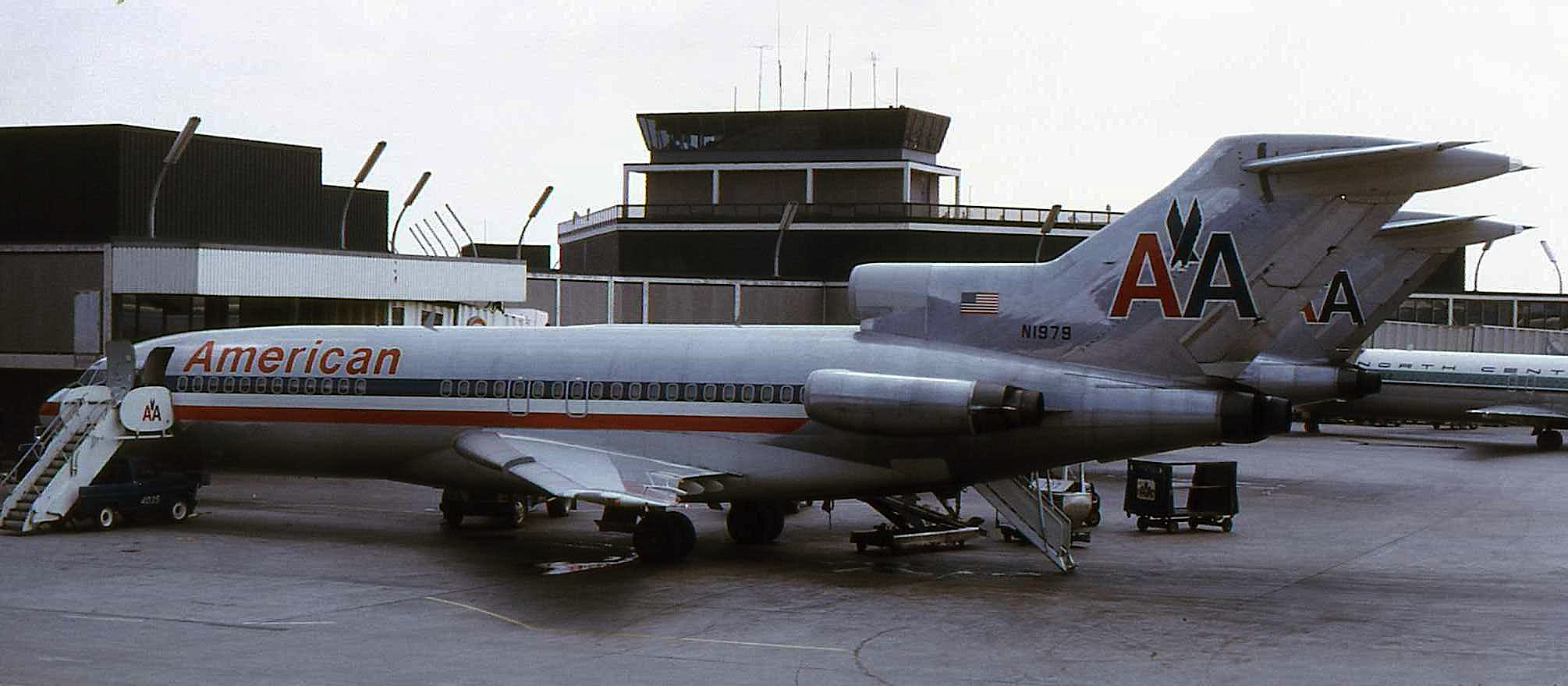
Nikola Kavaja hijacked American Airlines Flight 293 in 1979 with the intention of crashing it into the League of Communists of Yugoslavia headquarters in Belgrade.

A group of six Serbian nationalists, among them Boško Radonjić, placed a home-made bomb in the home of the Yugoslav consulate in Chicago in 1975. Radonjić later became the leader of the Westies gang in New York City, where he participated in organized crime and racketeering. He eventually became one of the most feared gangsters in the New York City underworld, and developed extensive friendships with Vojislav Stanimirović, John Gotti and the Gambino family. After Sammy Gravano turned John Gotti in to the Federal Bureau of Investigation in December 1990, Radonjić was highly suspected to have attempted to fix the trial on John Gotti's behalf. As a result of this, Radonjić was arrested in December 1999 during a spectacular rerouted plane going to Cuba to a lockdown at Miami International Airport when he was tracked down by the FBI. He was arrested in the United States again in January 2000 for further investigation of the 1992 Gotti trial. Upon release in 2001, he left the United States and moved back to Serbia where he lived until his death in 2011. He was also an admirer and long-time friend of Radovan Karadžić until the latter went into hiding in 1996.

In the 1980s, Vojislav Šešelj taught political science at the University of Michigan after being expelled by the League of Communists of Yugoslavia in 1981. In June 1989, he traveled to the United States again to meet with Momčilo Đujić in San Marcos, California, where Đujić named him Chetnik Vojvoda (duke in Serbian). He went on to form the Serbian Radical Party in 1991 and was accused by the ICTY tribunal of leading the Beli Orlovi militants in Bosnia and Herzegovina and in war-state Republic of Serbian Krajina. Radovan Karadžić pursued post-graduate medical studies at Columbia University from 1974 to 1975, but did so without any specific political agenda at the time being; he later became the war-time president of the Republika Srpska during the Bosnian War and subsequently went into hiding in Serbia until his capture in 2008 for ICTY charges of war crimes and genocide.

=== Deteriorating relations and Yugoslav Wars ===
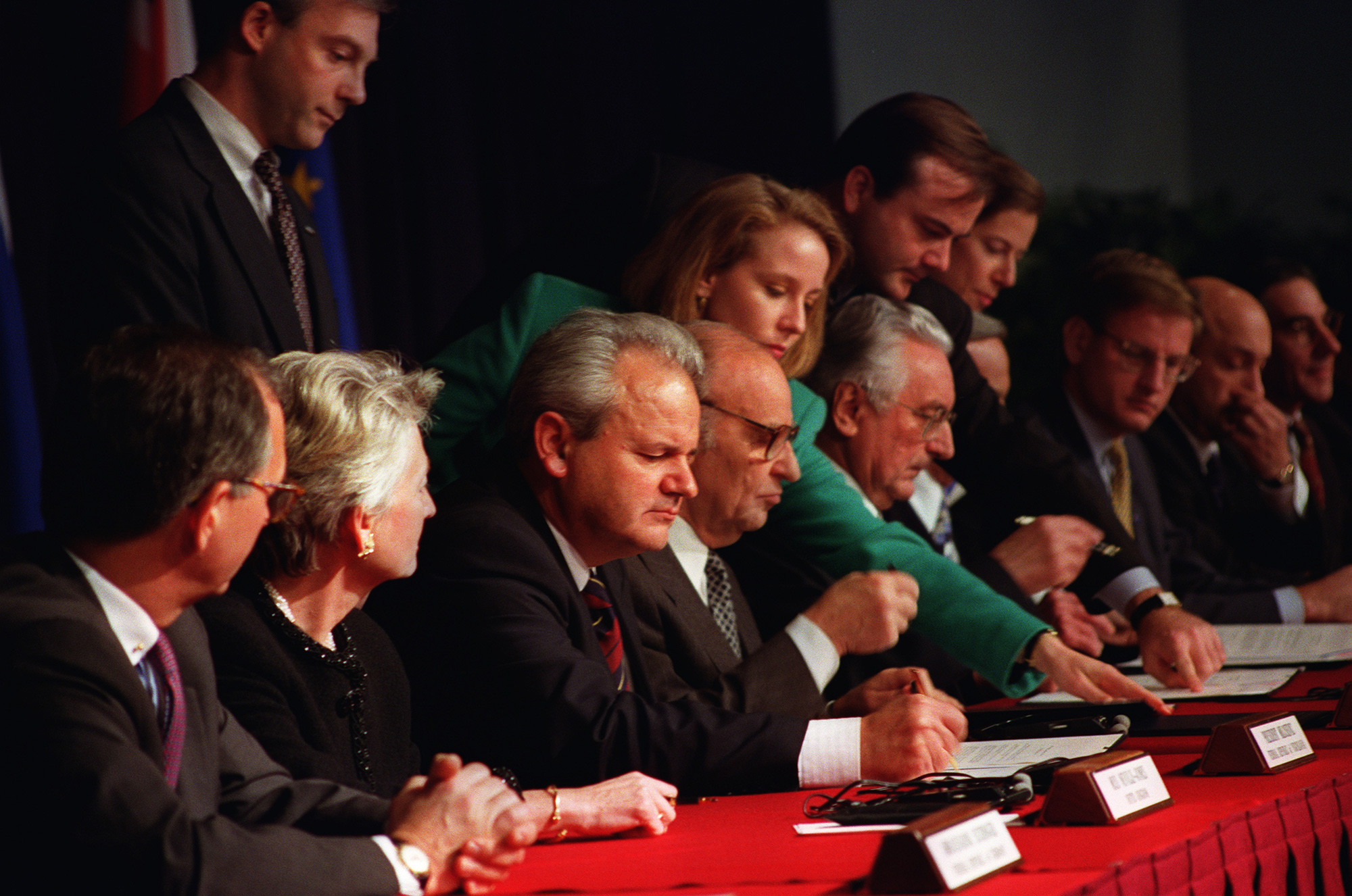
Seated from left to right: Slobodan Milošević, Alija Izetbegović, Franjo Tuđman signing the Dayton Peace Accords at Wright-Patterson Air Force Base, 1995

The first form of sanctions initiated by the US against Yugoslavia took place already from 1990 as the Nickels Amendment, which was sponsored by senators Don Nickles and Bob Dole. The amendment was passed due to concerns about Albanians being arrested in Kosovo. The amendment officially came into legal effect from May 6, 1992; although it applied only to $5 million-worth of US foreign aid, it was reported as instrumental in denying SFR Yugoslavia its last application for IMF loans before its breakup and hyperinflation episode.

The breakup of Yugoslavia began in 1992, the territories consisting of Serbia, Montenegro, and Kosovo composed the Federal Republic of Yugoslavia. In the midst of the Yugoslav Wars, the United States as well as an overwhelming majority of states from the United Nations severed economic ties and imposed sanctions on FR Yugoslavia on May 30, 1992.

==== The Panić–Ćosić–Milošević triangle and the United States ====
The Yugoslav government of the newly formed FR Yugoslavia (one of successors to SFR Yugoslavia) ended up having three ideologically-opposed leaders occupying executive positions. From 1992, while Slobodan Milošević was the president of Serbia, national theorist Dobrica Ćosić was named President of FR Yugoslavia. Meanwhile, Milan Panić, a business magnate based in Newport Beach, California, accepted Milošević's invitation to be Prime Minister of FR Yugoslavia. Panić was subsequently elected as prime minister in the 1992 Yugoslav parliamentary elections. The United States did not revoke Panić's citizenship even though his occupation of an executive position in the Yugoslav government clearly contradicted the United States Constitution. Nevertheless, Panić would become a person of interest in US diplomatic circles, given his business and residence backgrounds. At a CSCE meeting in Helsinki in July 1992, US Secretary of State James Baker abruptly dismissed Panić's appeal to reduce the sanctions to Yugoslavia, even after an agreement (between Panić, Milošević, and Dušan Mitević) was reached by which Milošević would resign in return for sanction-relief. This ended up severely damaging Panić's unique diplomatic position internationally, as well as his standing in Yugoslavia. The Los Angeles Times published an article which described Panić as a doubtful upholder of potential American-Yugoslavian peacemaking, when in fact, many years later made to be known, Panić was actually invited by Baker in the first place rather than voluntarily coming to Helsinki.

Panić and former US ambassador to Yugoslavia John Douglas Scanlan cooperated on a deep level in a campaign to challenge conservative politicians which echoed Baker's disapproval of giving Yugoslavia sanctions-relief in return for Milošević's planned resignation. One of Panić's advisors, academic Ljubiša Rakić, was dispatched to explain to Larry Eagleburger that the H.W. Bush administration was mistaken in seeing Panić as a Milošević puppet. Eagleburger replied, "Don't worry, we are going to do our own thing".

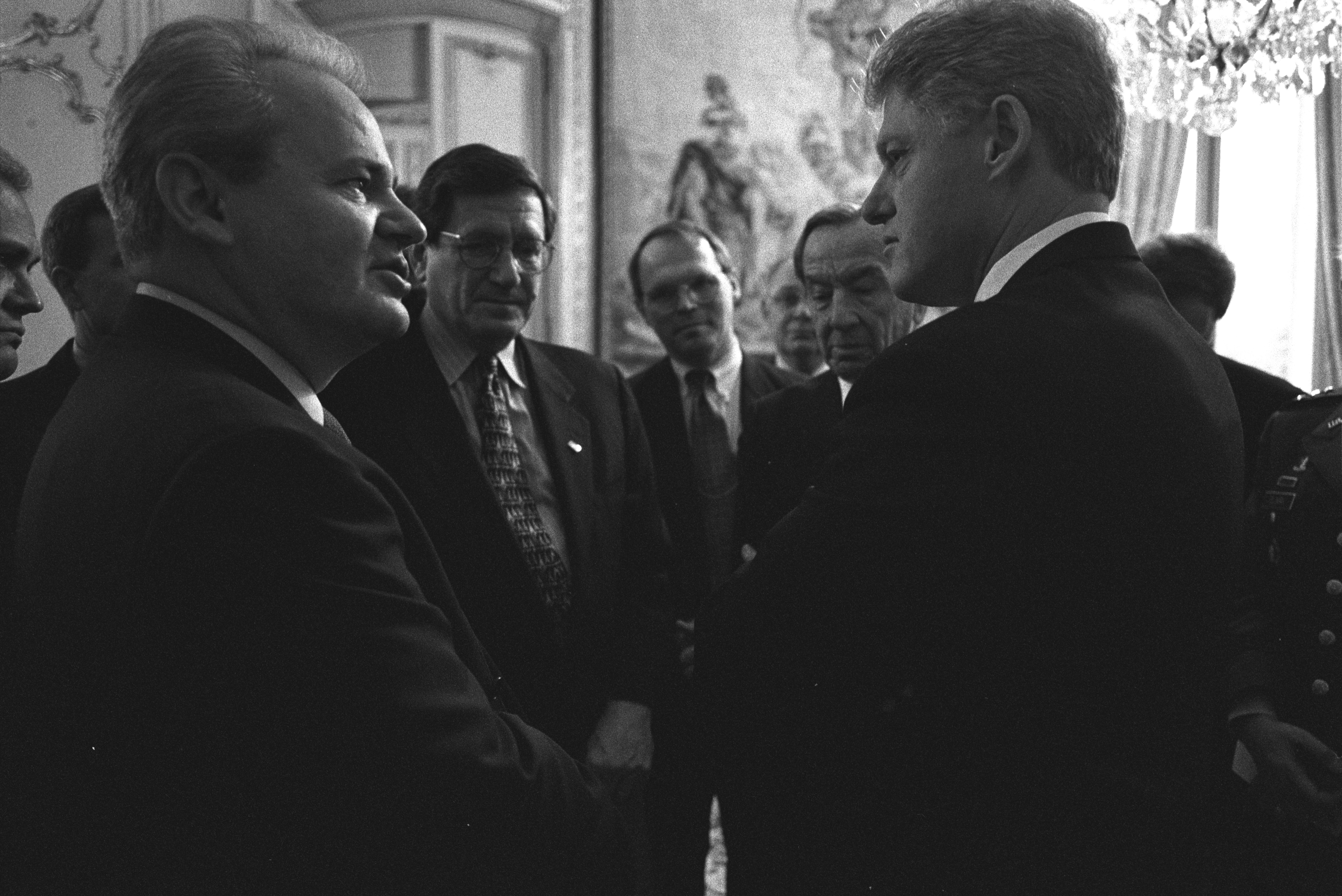
Slobodan Milošević, President of Serbia, with Bill Clinton, President of the United States, 1995

The three-pronged government lasted only from May to December 1992, as Panić and Ćosić decided to challenge Milošević in institutionally-revised elections in December that same year. The December election ended up as a failure for the opposition to Milošević, as Ćosić pulled out of the campaign in the last moment due to health problems. Multiple politicians of the opposition parties criticized the US-instigated fossil-fuel sanctions in the midst of a cold 1992–93 winter, saying that they actually further helped sympathy for Milošević and not against him.

==== Post-Dayton lull ====
On November 21, 1995, Serbian president Slobodan Milošević travelled to the United States to sign the Dayton Peace Accords with Croatian president Franjo Tuđman and Bosnian president Alija Izetbegović near Dayton, Ohio. Months later, sanctions against Yugoslavia were finally lifted in October 1996.

In 1997, a group of 17 economists wrote a letter titled "Program Radikalnih Ekonomskih Reformi u Jugoslaviji", advocating liberal macroeconomic policy by creating alarming predictions of the Yugoslav economy from 1998 to 2010. Not by coincidence, the letter was first published by B92, arguably the most West-friendly media outlet in Yugoslavia at the time. This would be the base for what would become a highly controversial political party in Serbia, G17 Plus, which began as an NGO funded by the National Endowment for Democracy. The original writers of the 1997 letter subsequently divided, as some either shunned or even criticized G17's fundamentals, whereas others would end up occupying positions in the post-Milošević government from 2000.

==== NATO bombing of Yugoslavia ====
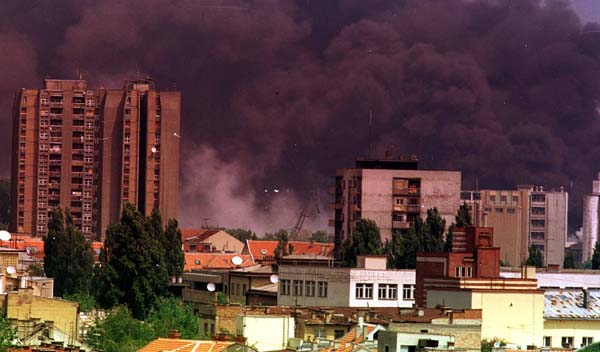
Smoke from bombed oil refinery in Novi Sad, 1999

The United States reinstated sanctions against Yugoslavia in March 1998 when the Kosovo War started. Shortly after the controversies at Račak and Rambouillet, American diplomat Richard Holbrooke traveled to Belgrade in March 1999 to deliver the final ultimatum requesting entry of UN forces into Kosovo and Serbia with full freedom from persecution under Serbian law for the intervening force. Milošević rejected the ultimatum, and the United States completely severed ties with Yugoslavia on March 23, 1999. Bill Clinton became the first president to declare war while bypassing a Congressional majority. The establishment of the bombing campaign was contested by one of the tightest voting margins in the entire history of the House of Representatives (213–213). Out of all the territories in Yugoslavia at the time, Serbia was bombed the most due to its concentration of military targets. As a result of Slobodan Milošević granting entry to KFOR in Kosovo, the war against Yugoslavia ceased on June 10, 1999.

=== Overthrow of Milošević ===
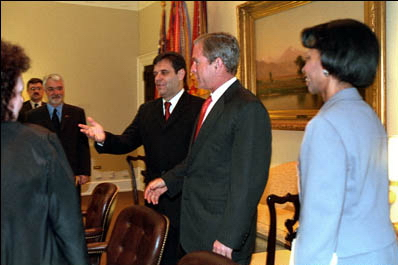
Vojislav Koštunica, President of FR Yugoslavia, and George W. Bush, President of the United States, in the White House, 2001

A group named Otpor!, originally formed by students in 1998 with the financial assistance of USAID, International Republican Institute, and NED, was one of multiple significant participants in the Bulldozer Revolution, from which Milošević was overthrown. USAID donated over $30 million for Otpor to "purchase cell phones and computers for DOS's leadership and to recruit and train an army of 20,000 election monitors" as well as to supplement them with "a sophisticated marketing campaign with posters, badges and T-shirts." In 2013, several media outlets reported that a CIA operative, Francis Archibald, participated in the organization of the October 5 coup, citing an Associated Press article which said that the overthrow was "regarded inside the CIA as a blueprint for running a successful peaceful covert action".

After the Bulldozer Revolution on October 5, 2000, the United States reestablished a diplomatic presence in Belgrade. The new president, Vojislav Koštunica, was initially lukewarm about talks with the US and ruled out a meeting with President Clinton or a visit by Secretary of State Madeleine Albright. US sanctions against FR Yugoslavia were lifted in January 2001 but the United States under the Bush administration denied giving any aid to Yugoslavia even several months after UN sanctions were lifted until Koštunica promised to cooperate with demands from The Hague regarding the Slobodan Milošević trial.

=== Democratic transition and Montenegro's independence ===
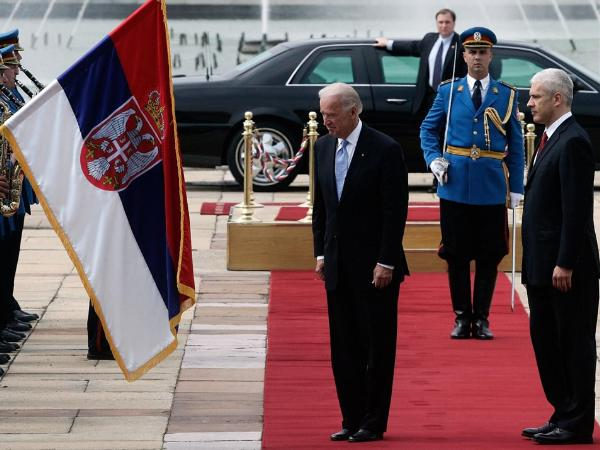
Joe Biden, Vice President of the United States and Boris Tadić, President of Serbia, in Belgrade, 2009

After Milošević was arrested by the police under the new Yugoslav government, the United States pressured Yugoslavia to extradite Milošević to the ICTY or lose financial aid from the International Monetary Fund and World Bank. In March 2001, American economist Joseph Stiglitz traveled to Belgrade to talk to a prominent Democratic Opposition leader, Zoran Đinđić, about the potential consequences of IMF-sponsored austerity. Koštunica denounced the extradition of his predecessor to the Hague Tribunal, which he saw as an instrument of U.S. foreign policy, and opposed NATO involvement in Kosovo.

On June 25, 2001, Stiglitz published a paper, "Serbia's Advantages in Coming Late", about the necessity for Serbia not to rush privatization and not to pursue "shock therapy", which was the established macroeconomic advice of the Bretton Woods institutions. Đinđić, however, did not live long to analyze the advice of the Bretton Woods institutions or the anti-austerity plan of Stiglitz, as he was assassinated on March 12, 2003. The G17 Plus got into an intense standoff with the Serbian government, composed mostly by DOS, due to the fact that G17 Plus continuously lobbied for the dissolution of the state union of Serbia and Montenegro. Later, in May 2006, Montenegro declared independence from the Serbo-Montenegrin state union; the United States immediately respected the results and urged the new government in Podgorica to keep close ties with Serbia. The United States recognized Serbia as the official successor state of the Serbia and Montenegro and the preceding Yugoslav state.

Outside of fiscal policy, American influence was evident in executive positions. In September 2002, it was announced that the Military Court in Belgrade was to press charges against Momčilo Perišić, who was the vice president of the Federal Republic of Yugoslavia at the time, for espionage in the favour of the CIA. The trial never took place, although upon his release from The Hague on February 28, 2013, it was announced by Perišić's lawyer Novak Lukić that his client was "ready to be judged" on the same 2002 accusations of espionage. In 2022, after a long process and a first-instance verdict, the Court of Appeal issued a verdict according to which Perišić was guilty of espionage and sentenced to 4 years in prison.

=== Independence of Kosovo ===
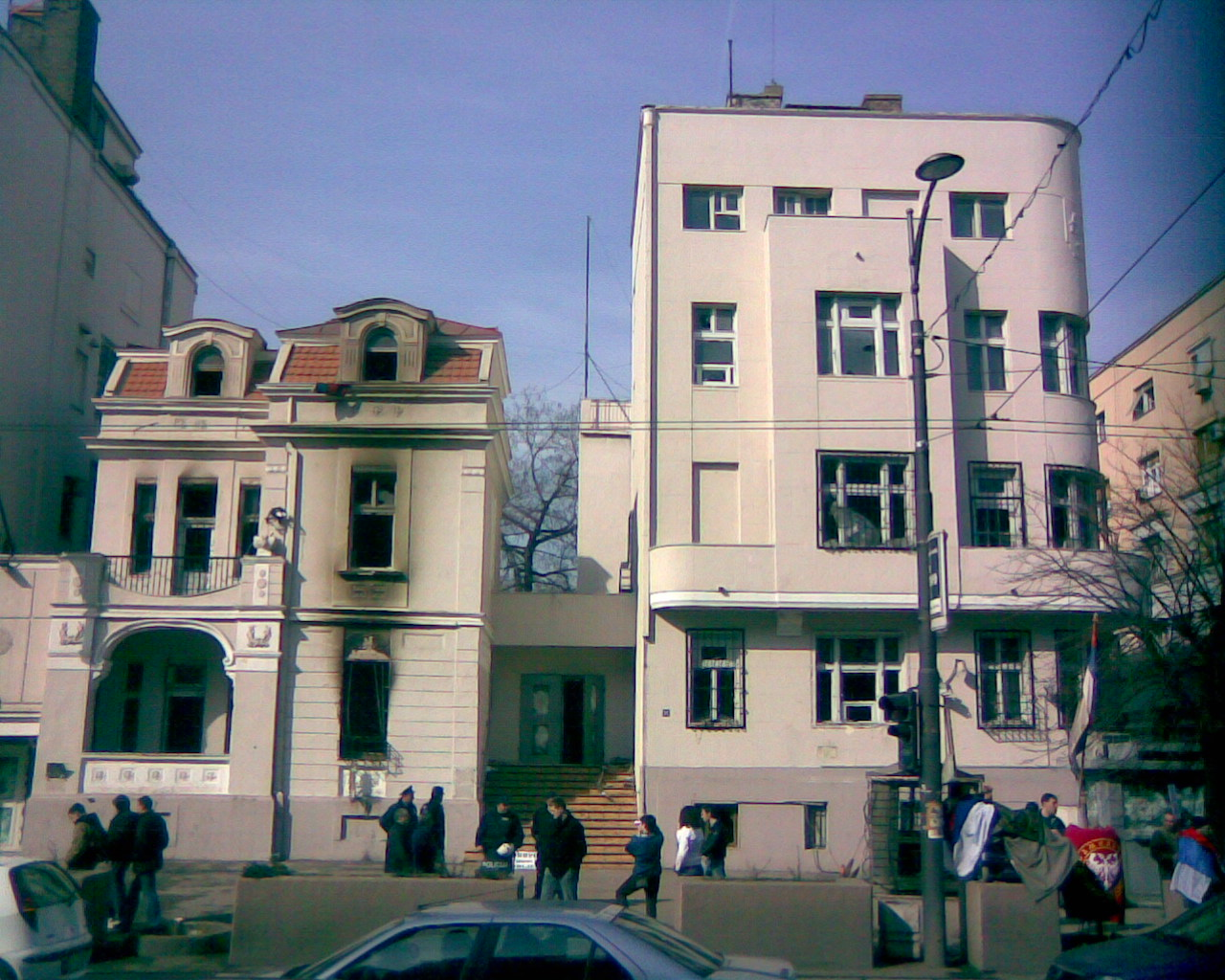
The evacuated United States embassy in Belgrade after the demonstrations against Kosovo's proclamation of independence, 2008

On February 15, 2008, it was announced that the pro-Western Boris Tadić won the 2008 Serbian presidential election. The 2008 elections were particularly important to Serbia's relations with the United States, as the main challenging party which lost the election, SRS, disintegrated when Tomislav Nikolić split with Vojislav Šešelj over integration into the European Union. When Nikolić split from SRS and began pursuing a pro-European profile (a reversal from SRS's eurosceptic position), he was being advised by American lobbying firm Quinn Gillespie & Associates.

Only a few days after this election result, the declaring of independence by Kosovo spurred off widespread unrest in Serbia, during which the embassy of the United States was evacuated and then torched by a mob. One man of Serbian nationality was killed inside of the embassy during the unrest. Serbia temporarily withdrew its ambassador from Washington, D.C., but the U.S. embassy in Belgrade was closed only for several days. Ambassador Cameron Munter said that no degrading of relations were expected regardless of the unrest.

=== Recent period ===
On 19 April 19 2012, shortly before the 2012 Serbian parliamentary and presidential election, former New York City mayor Rudy Giuliani traveled to Belgrade to attend a news conference with the SNS candidate for Belgrade mayor, Aleksandar Vučić. The US Embassy to Serbia released a statement saying that Giuliani's appearance did not represent the United States endorsing any candidate in Serbia's parliamentary upcoming election. The incumbent Belgrade mayor at the time, Dragan Đilas, slammed the conference which Giuliani attended, telling press that "Giuliani should not speak about Belgrade's future as a man who supported the bombing of Serbia."

The 2012 Serbian parliamentary and presidential elections both took place on May 6, 2012. The result ended with the removal of the incumbent DS-led coalition from the parliament majority, and the loss of incumbent Boris Tadić to Serbian Progressive Party candidate Tomislav Nikolić. On July 3, 2012, the US government sent Philip Reeker to Belgrade, who participated in an undisclosed discussion with Mlađan Dinkić of the United Regions of Serbia party in his first day there. Reeker subsequently talked to Čedomir Jovanović, Ivica Dačić, Aleksandar Vučić, and Tomislav Nikolić. The contents of the discussions were not disclosed to journalists, as they were repeatedly shunned when asking about Reeker's mission in Serbia. Reeker's meetings with the leaders of various parties shortly after the election resulted in speculation on the United States overtly forming a coalition in the Serbian government. In one instance, professor Predrag Simić from the University of Belgrade Faculty of Political Sciences claimed that Reeker's visit to Belgrade in July 2012 was an attempt to create a parliamentary coalition between Democratic Party and Serbian Progressive Party, as opposed to the Serbian Progressive Party-SPS bloc which had been composed by the election results.

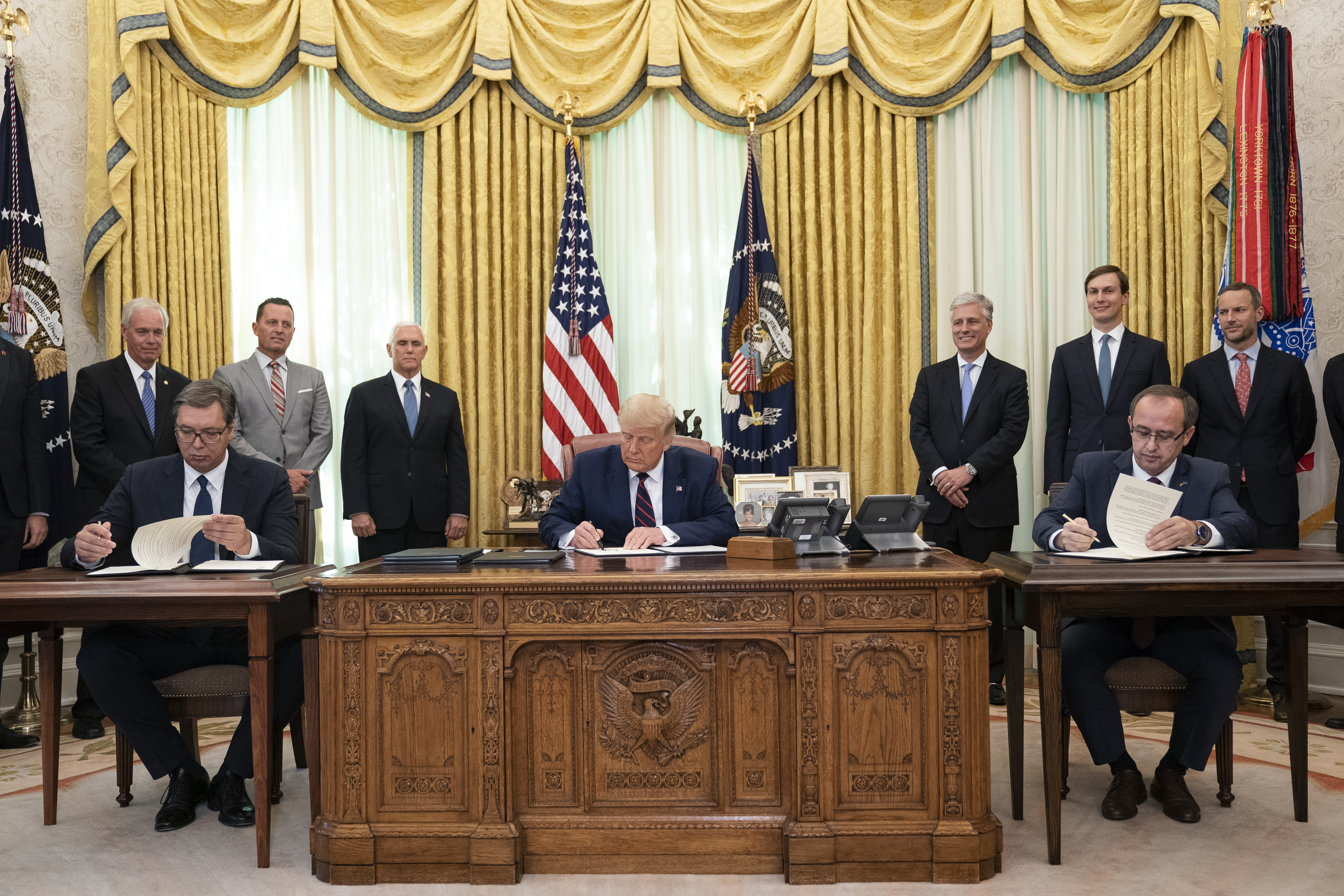
Aleksandar Vučić, President of Serbia, Donald Trump, President of the United States, and Avdullah Hoti, Prime Minister of Kosovo, signing the Kosovo and Serbia economic normalization agreements in the White House, 2020

In spite of the claim, the victorious SNS kept SPS as a coalition partner. However, United Regions of Serbia ultimately joined the ruling coalition, whose leader Dinkić was the first party leader Reeker spoke to in his July 2012 trip. Overall, the election ultimately resulted in the defeat of DS as they became the largest parliamentary opposition to SNS. The newly elected government ultimately continued Euro-Atlantic integration programs pursued by the Tadić administration.

According to the 2012 U.S. Global Leadership Report, only 20% of Serbian public approved of U.S. leadership, with 57% disapproving and 22% uncertain, the fifth-lowest rating for any surveyed European country that year.

Ahead of the 2016 presidential election in the United States, Vučić attended the Clinton Foundation's Global Initiative Annual Meeting held in September 2016. In the meeting, Vučić participated in a discussion about the relationship between Serbs and Bosniaks in Bosnia and Herzegovina with the former mayor of Srebrenica, Ćamil Duraković. The discussion was moderated by Bill Clinton. Subsequently, former Trump campaign consultant Roger Stone alleged on an InfoWars episode that the government of Serbia paid $2 million for attending the Clinton Foundation's meeting. Before his appearance at the Clinton Foundation forum, Vučić was interviewed by Gorislav Papić from Serbian TV show Oko ("Eye" in Serbian). When Papić asked Vučić why he appeared in the Clinton Foundation meeting in September 2016, Vučić asked Papić, "what, you want to get into a conflict with Hillary Clinton?" Vučić insisted that he was neutral in the US election in spite of his appearance at the Clinton Foundation meeting, adding that "Serbia is a small country to take sides of decisions made by Americans".

On October 4, 2019, U.S. President Donald Trump appointed Richard Grenell as the Special Presidential Envoy for Serbia–Kosovo negotiations. After months of diplomatic talks, on January 20, 2020 Serbia and Kosovo agreed to restore flights between Belgrade and Pristina for the first time in over 20 years.

On September 4, 2020 the President of Serbia, Aleksandar Vučić, and the Prime Minister of Kosovo, Avdullah Hoti, signed an agreement on the normalisation of economic relations between Serbia and Kosovo at the White House. The deal will encompass freer transit, including by rail and road, while both parties agreed to work with the Export–Import Bank of the United States and the U.S. International Development Finance Corporation and to join the Open Balkan regional initiative, but the agreement also included the relocation of the Serbian embassy to Jerusalem, as well as, and mutual recognition between Israel and Kosovo.

== Economic relations ==
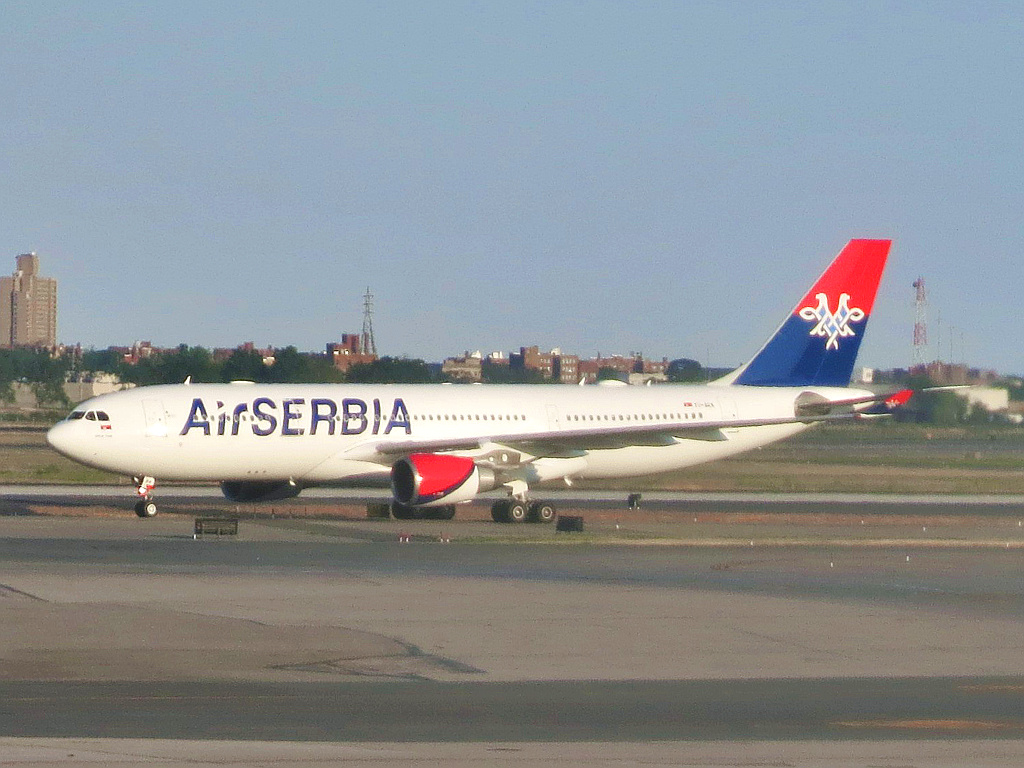
Air Serbia Airbus A330-200 at JFK International Airport

The United States is Serbia's major trading partner in the Western hemisphere. Trade between two countries amounted to $1.26 billion in 2022 with American merchandise exports to Serbia at $725 million while Serbian exports stood at $521 million.

As of 2023, more than 250 American companies are present in Serbia employing approximately 22,000 workers and in last two decades they invested over $5 billion in the country. Blue-chip American corporations present in Serbia include PepsiCo, Philip Morris, Molson Coors, Archer Daniels Midland, Goodyear, and Ball. The United States is the primary partner of Serbia in the ICT industry, with likes of Microsoft, AMD, and NCR having their development centers in Belgrade.

Serbian flag carrier Air Serbia operates flights between Belgrade and New York City as well as Belgrade and Chicago.

== Immigration from Serbia ==
There is a sizable Serbian diaspora in the United States; according to data from the 2023 American Community Survey, 181,469 people stated that they had Serb ancestry (whether alone or in combination with another ancestry), out of which 42,968 were Serbia-born. The Serbian American community is concentrated in Great Lakes region, with major hubs in Chicago, Cleveland, and Milwaukee metro areas.

== Resident diplomatic missions ==
- Serbia has an embassy in Washington, D.C. and a consulates general in Los Angeles and Chicago.
- The United States has an embassy in Belgrade.
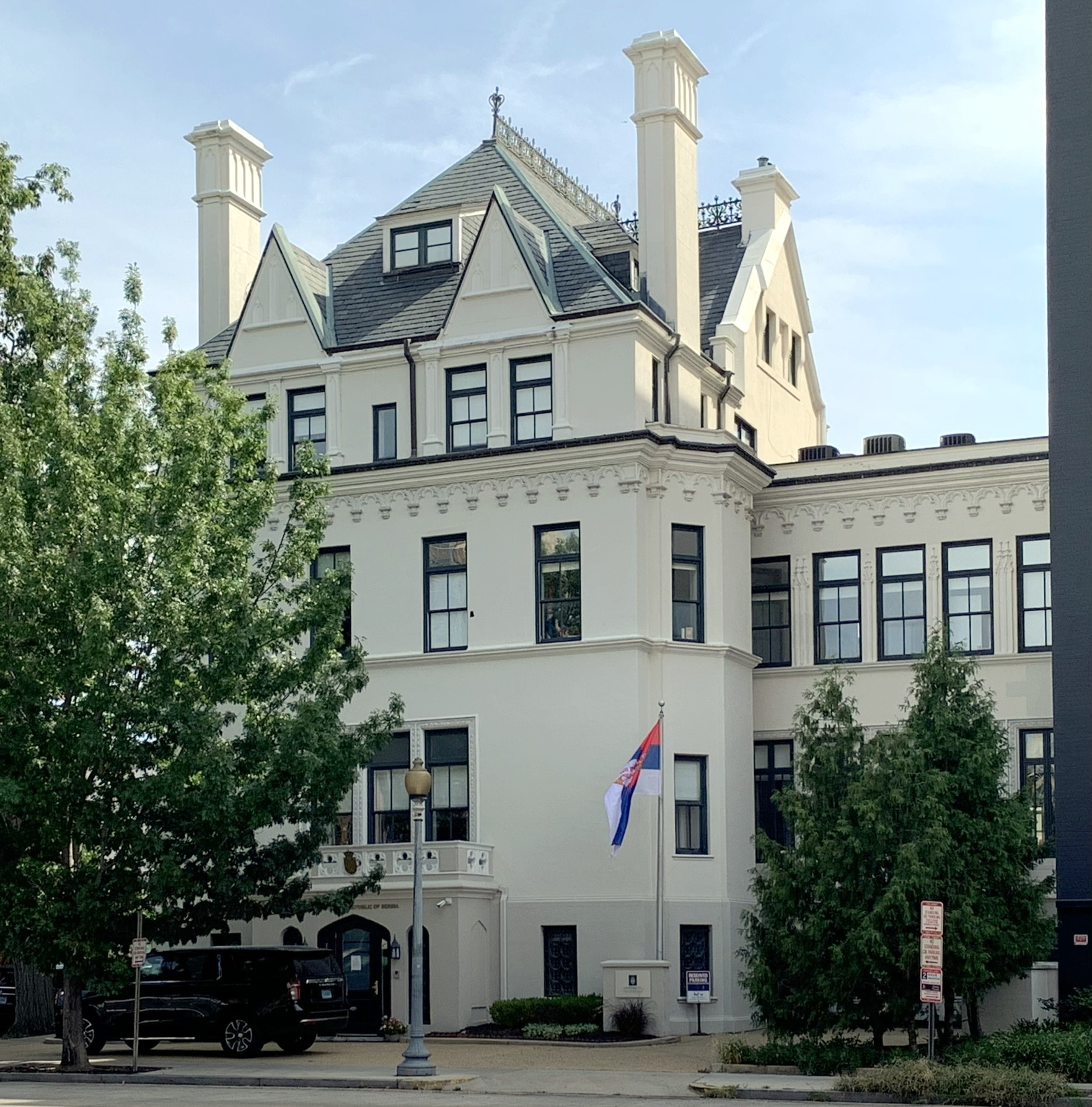
Embassy of Serbia in Washington, D.C.

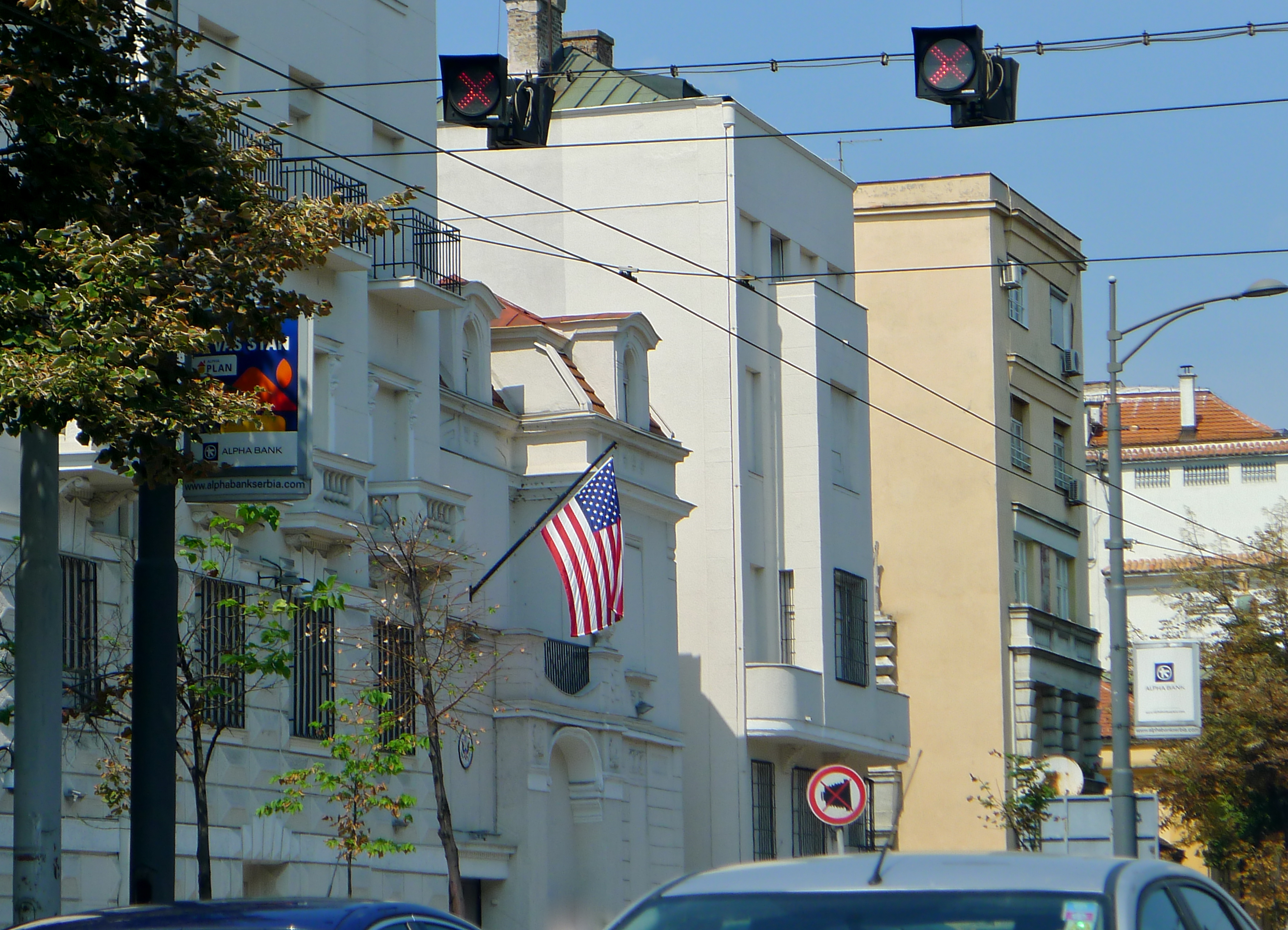
U.S. embassy in Belgrade

== See also ==
- Foreign relations of Serbia
- Foreign relations of the United States
- Serbia–NATO relations
- United States–Yugoslavia relations

== Sources ==
- Vuković, Sava (1998). History of the Serbian Orthodox Church in America and Canada 1891–1941. Kragujevac: Kalenić.
- Doder, Dusko; Branson, Louise (1999). Milosevic: Portrait of a Tyrant. Free Press. ISBN 978-1-4391-3639-3.
- Parenti, Michael (2002) [2000]. To Kill a Nation: The Attack on Yugoslavia. Verso. ISBN 978-1-85984-366-6.
- - Serbia
