= Zoran Alimpić =

Serbian politician

- Зоран Алимпић
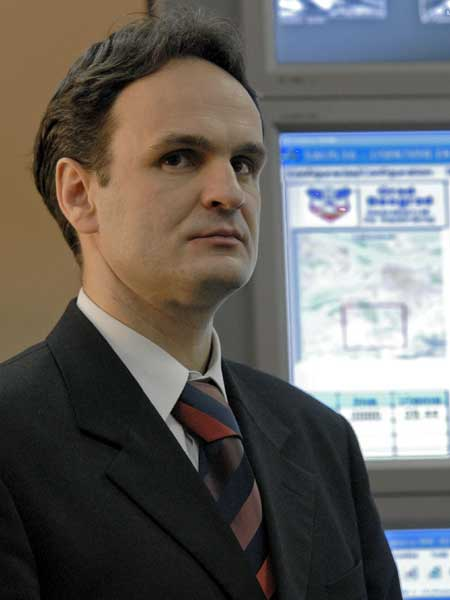

Acting Mayor of Belgrade
- In office 27 September 2007 – 21 July 2008
- Preceded by: Nenad Bogdanović
- Succeeded by: Branislav Belić

Personal details
- Born: 20 October 1965 (age 60) Pančevo, SR Serbia, SFR Yugoslavia
- Party: DS
- Spouse: Ljiljana Alimpić
- Education: University of Belgrade

Zoran Alimpić (Serbian Cyrillic: Зоран Алимпић; born 20 October 1965) is the former chairman of the Assembly of the City of Belgrade.

He was born in Pančevo. He has lived in Belgrade since 1968, where he finished primary school, secondary architectural-engineering school, and Faculty of Forestry at the University of Belgrade.

After the Mayor of Belgrade, Nenad Bogdanović, died in September 2007, Zoran Alimpić served as the acting mayor until the election of Dragan Đilas.

He was a councilor of the Municipal Assembly of Čukarica in three terms, from 1994 to 2004 and has been a councilor of the City of Belgrade Assembly since 1996. He was the chairman of the Municipal Assembly of Čukarica in two terms – from 1997 to November 2004. Since July 2004 he has been a Member of the National Assembly of Serbia. He is currently a councilor of the Assembly of the City of Belgrade.

He is currently the Deputy Chairman of the City Board of the Democratic Party.

== See also ==
- Mayor of Belgrade

Political offices
| Preceded by Nenad Bogdanović | Acting Mayor of Belgrade; October 2007 – July 2008 | Succeeded by Branislav Belić (acting) |
