= Embassy of Serbia, Washington, D.C. =

Serbian Embassy, Washington, D.C.
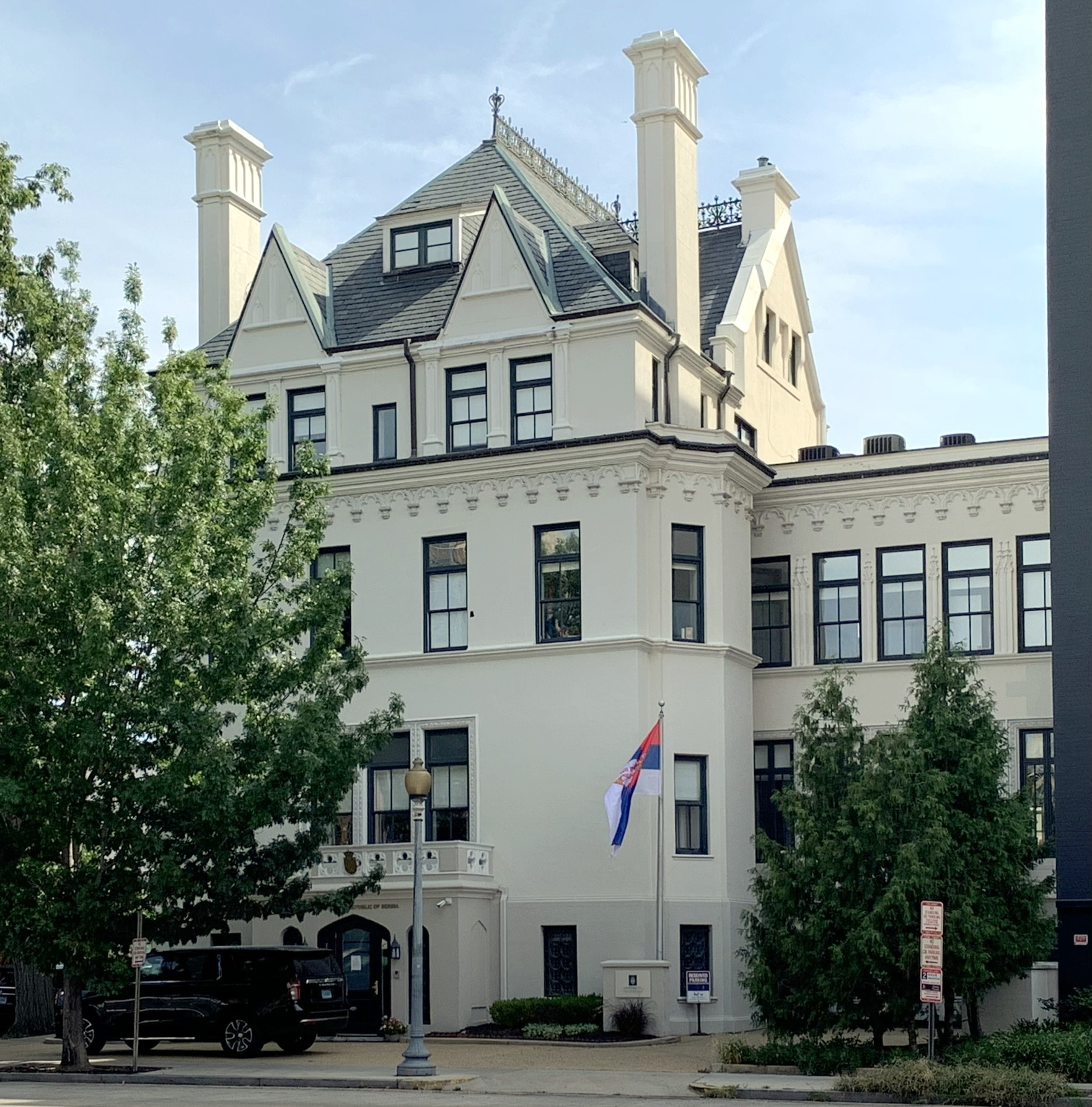
- Chancery of the Serbian Embassy in Washington, D.C.
- Location: Dupont Circle
- Address: 1333 16th Street NW
- Coordinates: 38.908333°N 77.035833°W
- Ambassador: Dragan Šutanovac
- Website: www.washington.mfa.gov.rs

The Embassy of Serbia, Washington, D.C. (Serbian: Амбасада Србије у Вашингтону) or alternatively, Serbian Embassy, Washington, D.C. (Serbian: Српска амбасада у Вашингтону) is the primary diplomatic mission of Serbia to the United States. The embassy is located at 1333 16th Street NW, in the Dupont Circle neighborhood of Washington, D.C. The current ambassador of Serbia to the United States is Dragan Šutanovac, since May 8, 2025.

== See also ==
- List of ambassadors of Serbia to the United States
- Serbia–United States relations
- List of diplomatic missions in Washington, D.C.
- List of diplomatic missions of Serbia
- Foreign relations of Serbia
