= Nenad Bogdanović =

Serbian politician

- Ненад Богдановић
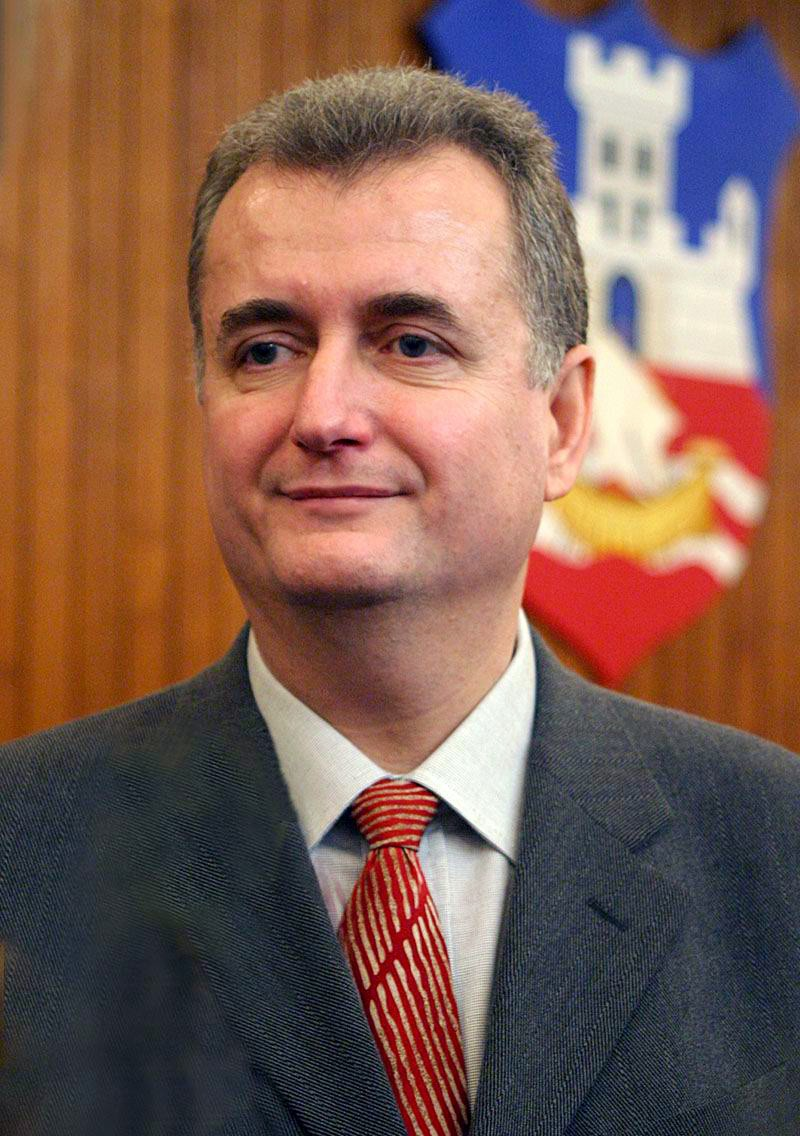

71st Mayor of Belgrade
- In office 3 October 2004 – 27 September 2007
- Preceded by: Radmila Hrustanović
- Succeeded by: Zoran Alimpić (Acting); Branislav Belić (Acting); Dragan Đilas

Personal details
- Born: 12 May 1954 Beška, PR Serbia, FPR Yugoslavia
- Died: 27 September 2007 (aged 53) Belgrade, Serbia
- Party: Democratic Party
- Education: University of Belgrade

Nenad Bogdanović (Serbian Cyrillic: Ненад Богдановић, pronounced [nênaːd bogdǎːnoʋit͡ɕ]; 12 May 1954 – 27 September 2007) was a Serbian politician who served as the mayor of Belgrade from 2004 to 2007.

== Education and career ==
Bogdanović was born on 12 May 1954. He completed his high school education at Matematička gimnazija (a school of Special National Interest) and then graduated from the University of Belgrade Faculty of Electrical Engineering, earning a Magister of Sciences in Electrical Engineering.

Bogdanović then worked in the telecommunications sector, first on research and development and later, in managerial jobs.

In 1989, he was appointed Director of the joint venture of Messrs. GTE Telecommunications and EI Pupin. Two years later, he became the Commercial Manager and, as of 1996, he had been the General Manager of Alkatel Pupin Jugoslavija.

Bogdanović became a member of the Democratic Party (DS) in 1992 and was elected as Chairman of the Zemun Board in 1993, thereafter the Vice Chairman of the City Board and the commissioner for Belgrade. In 2001 he became an MP in the National Parliament of Serbia.

Bogdanović was elected Mayor of Belgrade in 2004. He served until his death in 2007 after succumbing to a "grave illness". Afterwards, Zoran Alimpić and Branislav Belić became acting Mayors of Belgrade, and was eventually succeeded by Dragan Đilas.

== See also ==
- Mayor of Belgrade

Political offices
Preceded by Radmila Hrustanović	Mayor of Belgrade; 2004 – 2007	Succeeded by Zoran Alimpić (acting)
