= Narrow-gauge railways in Bosnia and Herzegovina =

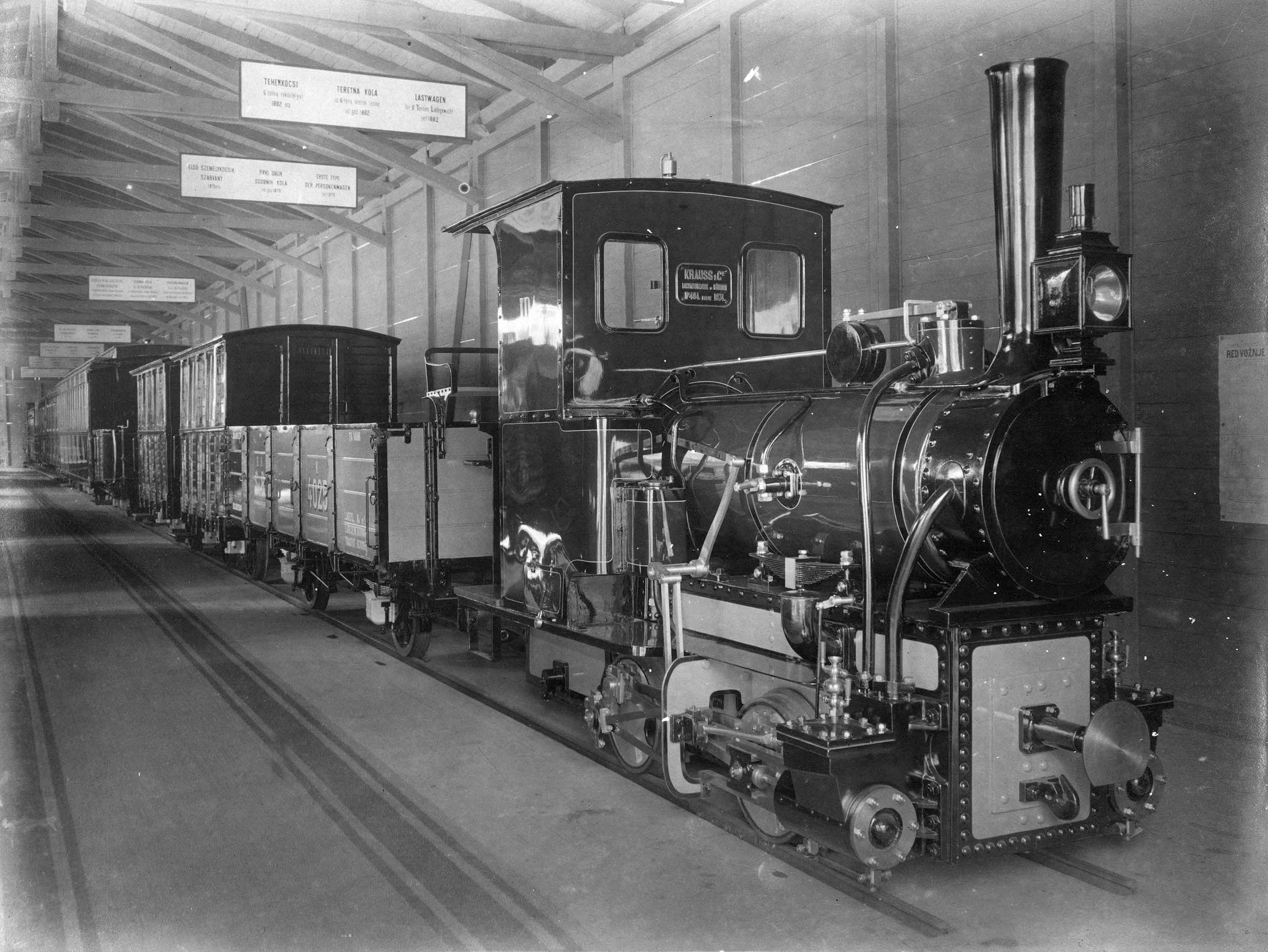
Rolling stock of the Old Bosnian State Railway (kkBB)

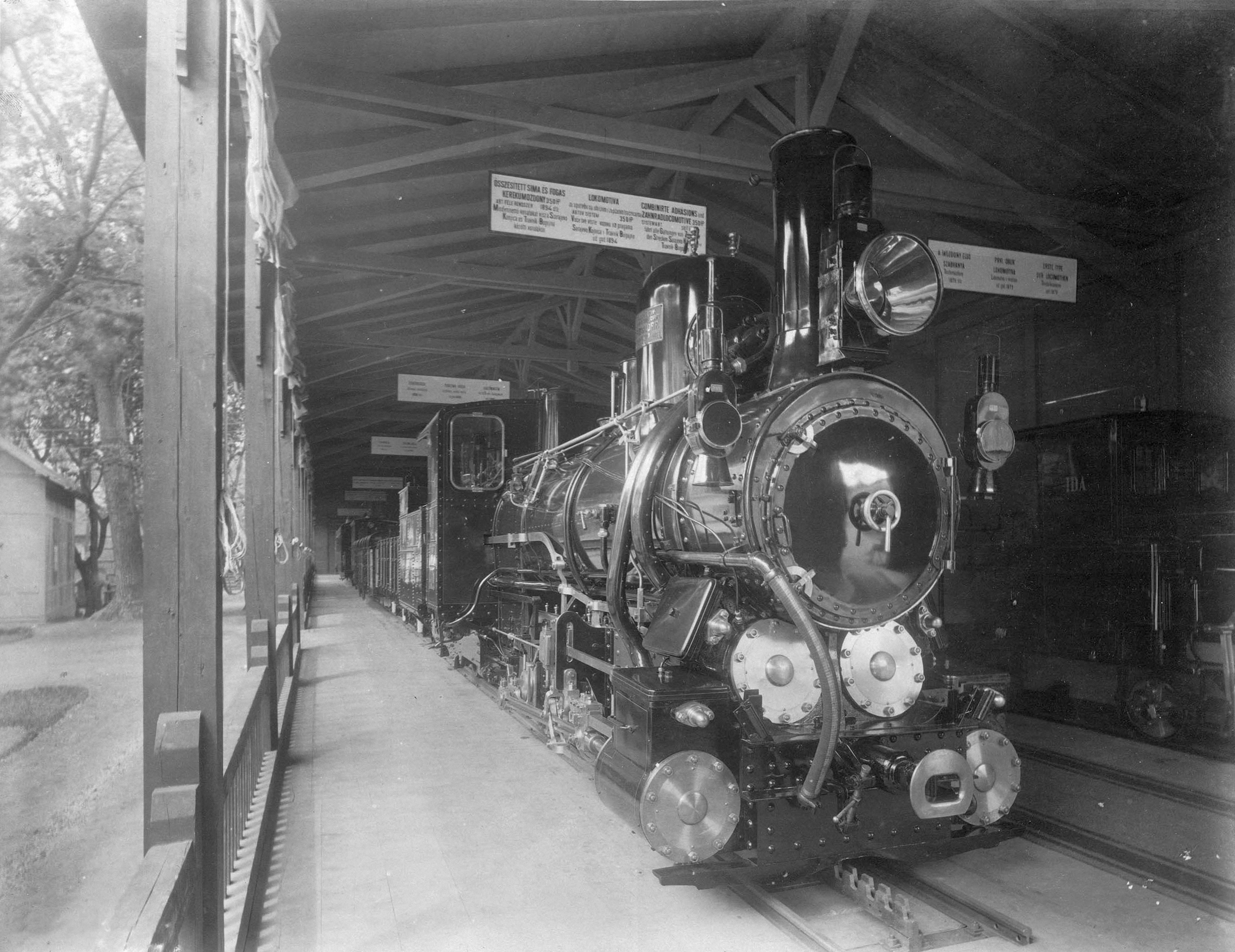
Rolling stock of the New Bosnian State Railway (BHStB)

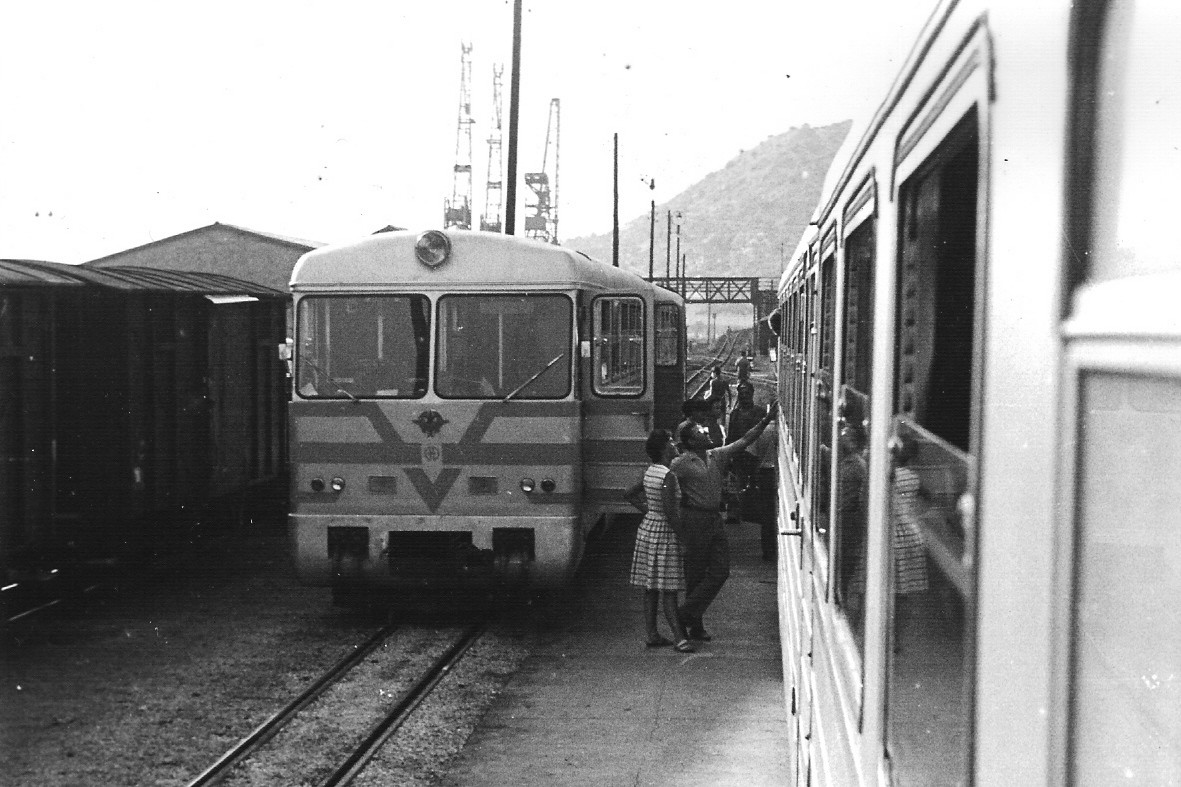
Railcar type JDŽ 802

Most Bosnian-gauge railway lines were built during the Austro-Hungarian Empire. Several 760 mm (2 ft 5 15/16 in) gauge railways were planned in order to link the extensive narrow-gauge railways in the Austro-Hungarian Empire with those in Bosnia and Herzegovina. Until the outbreak of the Balkan Wars in 1912 several were constructed.

Between World War I and World War II the network was extended significantly, at the end connecting the Adriatic Coast with Belgrade, with the network growing to around 1500 km in length.

Construction of a new standard-gauge line from Sarajevo to Ploče on the Adriatic in 1966 replaced the 760 mm (2 ft 5 15/16 in) Narentabahn (Narenta railway) from Sarajevo to the coast and isolated the south-western narrow-gauge system from the 760 mm (2 ft 5 15/16 in) railways starting at Sarajevo. With the demise of a connecting network all the other remaining narrow-gauge lines were then at risk and restricted to local traffic.

The system based on the Adriatic closed in 1975. By 1979 the rest of the Bosnian lines had closed. In Serbia the last 760 mm (2 ft 5 15/16 in) line closed in 1983. The most modern diesel railcars were sold to the Portuguese Railways (where they regauged to metre gauge for use on the Douro Valley metre-gauge lines, such as the Tua line), becoming Portuguese train type 9700.

== Central 760 mm (2 ft 5 15/16 in) gauge network ==
=== "Steinbeis" railways ===
Approximately 400 km, 1902–75.

Built as a group of four main forest railways of the "Bosnische Forstindustrie AG Otto Steinbeis". All four railways started off from Srnetica.

1. Srnetica–Šipovo–Jajce
  - In Jajce it connected directly further to Donji Vakuf via the Spalato railway)
2. Sanski Most – Srnetica – Prijedor
  - In Prijedor it had an interchange connection to the normal-gauge railway Dobrljin – Bosanski Novi – Prijedor – Banja Luka.
3. Srnetica – Drvar – Lička Kaldrma – Knin (Croatia)
  - In Knin it had an interchange connection to the normal-gauge railway system of Croatia.
  - "Unska pruga" normal-gauge railway was built in 1948 in the vicinity of this railway in the section between Knin and Lička Kaldrma, but both railways had their own distinct routes and even operated simultaneously for a short period of time.
4. Srnetica – Gornji Ribnik

These four main forestry railrays had numerous local forestry logging branches near Grmeč, Klekovača, Oštrelj, Manjača and Glamoč.

=== "Spalato" railway ===
Spalato Bahn (Splitska pruga); 104.5 km, built 1893–95, Connecting the Steinbeis railway with the Bosna railway.

- Lašva–Travnik; 30.1 km, 1893
  - With direct connection to "Bosna" railway in Lašva;
- Travnik – Donji Vakuf – Bugojno; 70.7 km, 1894, including 14.1 miles (22.7 km) of Abt rack railway over the Komar mountain pass
- Donji Vakuf – Jajce; 33.7 km, 1895
  - With direct connection to Steinbeis railway in Jajce;
- Bugojno–Aržano–Split; (Planned, never built)

=== Bosna railway ===
Bosnabahn (BHStB), 355.2 km

- Bosanski Brod – Derventa – Doboj – Maglaj – Zavidovići – Žepče – Zenica – Lašva – Kakanj – Visoko – Podlugovi – Semizovac – Sarajevo; 268.2 km, built 1879–1882;
  - It had direct connections to the following railways:
    - Doboj–Usora–Teslić railway in Doboj;
    - Doboj–Ω – Lukavac – Tuzla – Simin Han railway in Doboj;
    - Zavidovići – Olovo – Han Pijesak – Kusače in Zavidovići;
    - Spalato Railway in Lašva;
    - Podlugovi–Breza–Vareš in Podlugovi;
    - Semizovac–Srednje (Ilijaš)–Čevljanovići in Semizovac;
    - East Bosnian railway in Sarajevo;
    - Narenta railway in Sarajevo.

Railroad's demise:

- A sort-of replacement normal-gauge railroad Bosanski Šamac – Doboj – Maglaj – Zavidovići – Žepče – Zenica – Lašva – Kakanj – Visoko – Podlugovi – Semizovac – Sarajevo was built in 1947.
- This caused an immediate closure of the entire central section of the old narrow-gauge Bosna railway from Doboj to Zenica in 1947.
- However, its remaining two sections continued to operate:
  - Section "Bosanski Brod – Derventa – Doboj" operated until 1968, in order to keep the direct-gauge connection of the Teslić basin railway to Sava river at Bosanski Brod.
  - Section "Zenica–Lašva" continued to operate until 1975 (until the Spalato railway was discontinued), in order to provide direct-gauge connection of Zenica's industry with the areas serviced by Spalato railway.
  - Section "Lašva–Kakanj–Visoko–Sarajevo" continued to operate until 1967 (until the new normal-gauge railroad "Sarajevo–Konjic–Jablanica–Mostar–Čapljina–Ploče" was completed) in order to provide the direct-gauge connection of Zenica's industry with the port of Ploče.

=== Tuzla basin railway ===
- Doboj – Karanovac – Lukavac – Tuzla – Simin Han, 66.7 km, built 1886;
  - It had a direct connection to Bosna railway in Doboj.

=== Karanovac–Gračanica ===
- Karanovac–Gračanica; 4 km or 6.0 km (needs verification), 760 mm (2 ft 5 15/16 in), 1898–1967
  - It had a direct connection to Tuzla basin railway in Karanovac.

=== Teslić basin railway ===
- Doboj–Usora–Teslić, where it branched off in three relatively long directions to various local mountains and forests;
  - It had a direct connection to Bosna railway in Doboj.

=== Zavidovići – Olovo – Han Pijesak – Kusače ===
- Zavidovići – Olovo – Han Pijesak – Kusače
  - Built as a private forestry railroad with numerous local branches along the way.
    - Taken by the state later on and used as a mixed public / forestry railroad.
  - It had a direct connection to Bosna railway in Zavidovići.

=== Podlugovi–Breza–Vareš industrial railway ===
- Podlugovi–Breza–Vareš, 24.5 km;
  - Built primarily for servicing the iron and steel industry in Vareš;
  - It had a direct connection to Bosna railway in Podlugovi.

=== Semizovac–Srednje–Čevljanovići–Ivančići ===
- Semizovac–Srednje–Čevljanovići–Ivančići; 20.3 km built 1885.
  - Built primarily for extracting ores from mines in Čevljanovići and Ivančići;
  - It had a direct connection to Bosna railway in Semizovac.

=== Narenta railway ===
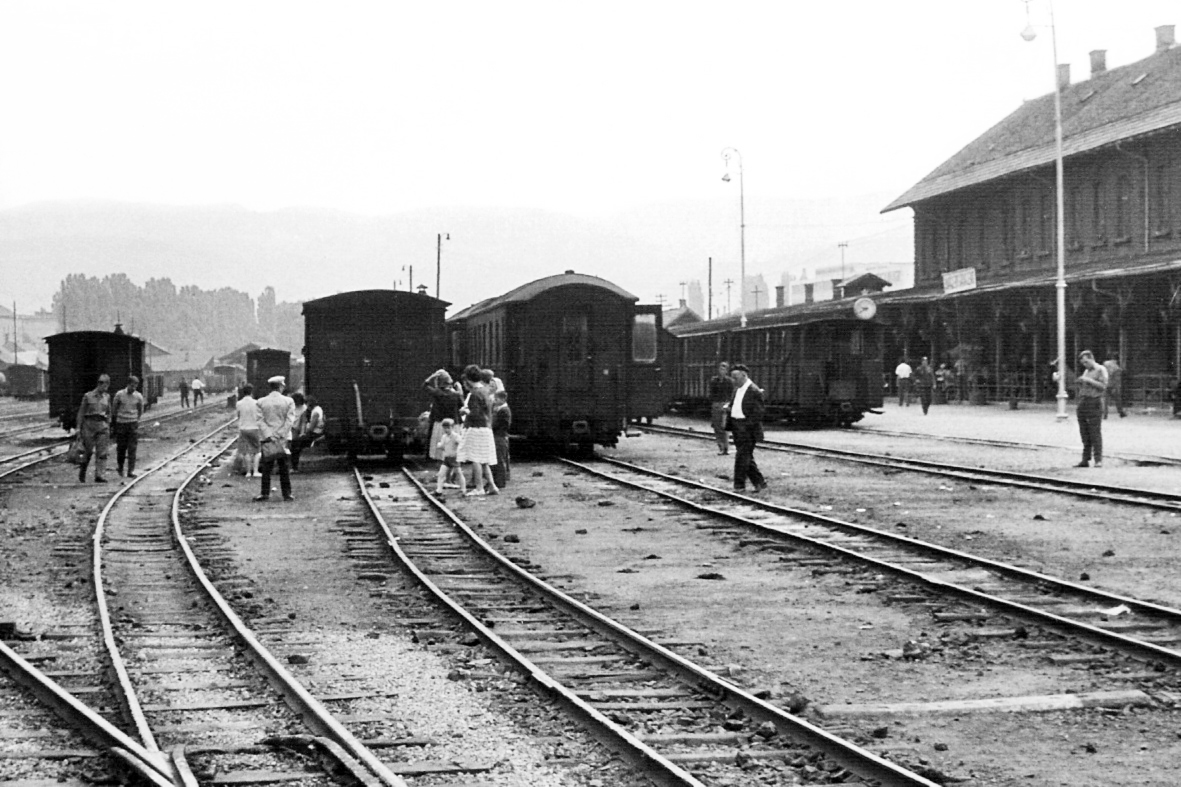
Sarajevo railway station

Narenta railway (German: Narentabahn, Bosnian: Neretvanska pruga); 178.4 km, constructed 1885–1891.

- Metković–Gabela–Čapljina–Mostar; 42.4 km, 1885 (Gabela is a junction with the Dalmatian railway)
- Mostar–Ostrožac; 65.9 km, 1888
- Ostrožac–Konjic; 13.0 km, 1889
- Konjic – Ivan pass – Hadžići – Ilidža – Sarajevo; 55.8 km, 1891 (including 18.8 miles (30.3 km) of Abt rack railway over the Ivan mountain pass, replaced with a tunnel in 1931, having a standard-gauge railway structure gauge profile).
  - Connecting with the Ostbahn and the Bosna railway at Sarajevo.
  - Branch: Ilidža – Banja Ilidža; 1.3 km, built 1892.

Ploče–Metković; 1942 extension to a planned sea harbour in Ploče.

=== Dalmatian and Zelenika railways ===
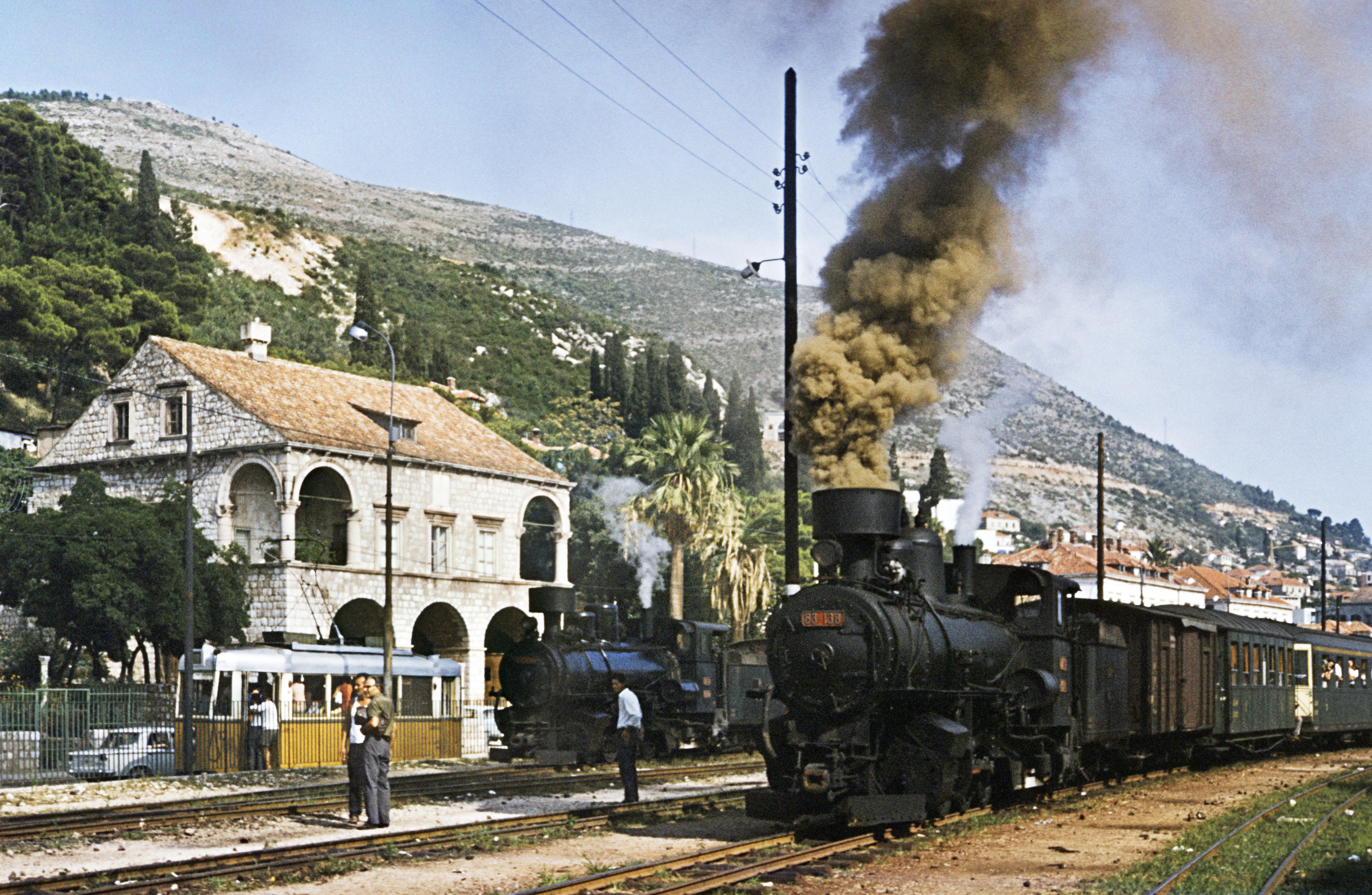
Dubrovnik railway station

Dalmatiner Bahn (Dalmatinska pruga); 188.6 km, built 1901.

- Gabela – Hum – Uskoplje – Herceg Novi (Montenegro) – Zelenika; 155.5 km (Gabela Junction–Narenta railway (Sarajevo))
- Hum–Trebinje, 17 km, built in 1901 and extended to Bileća in 1931 (37 km), Nikšić (Montenegro) in 1938 (71 km) and further to Podgorica in 1948 (56 km).
- Branch: Uskoplje–Dubrovnik; 16.5 km

=== East Bosnian railway ===
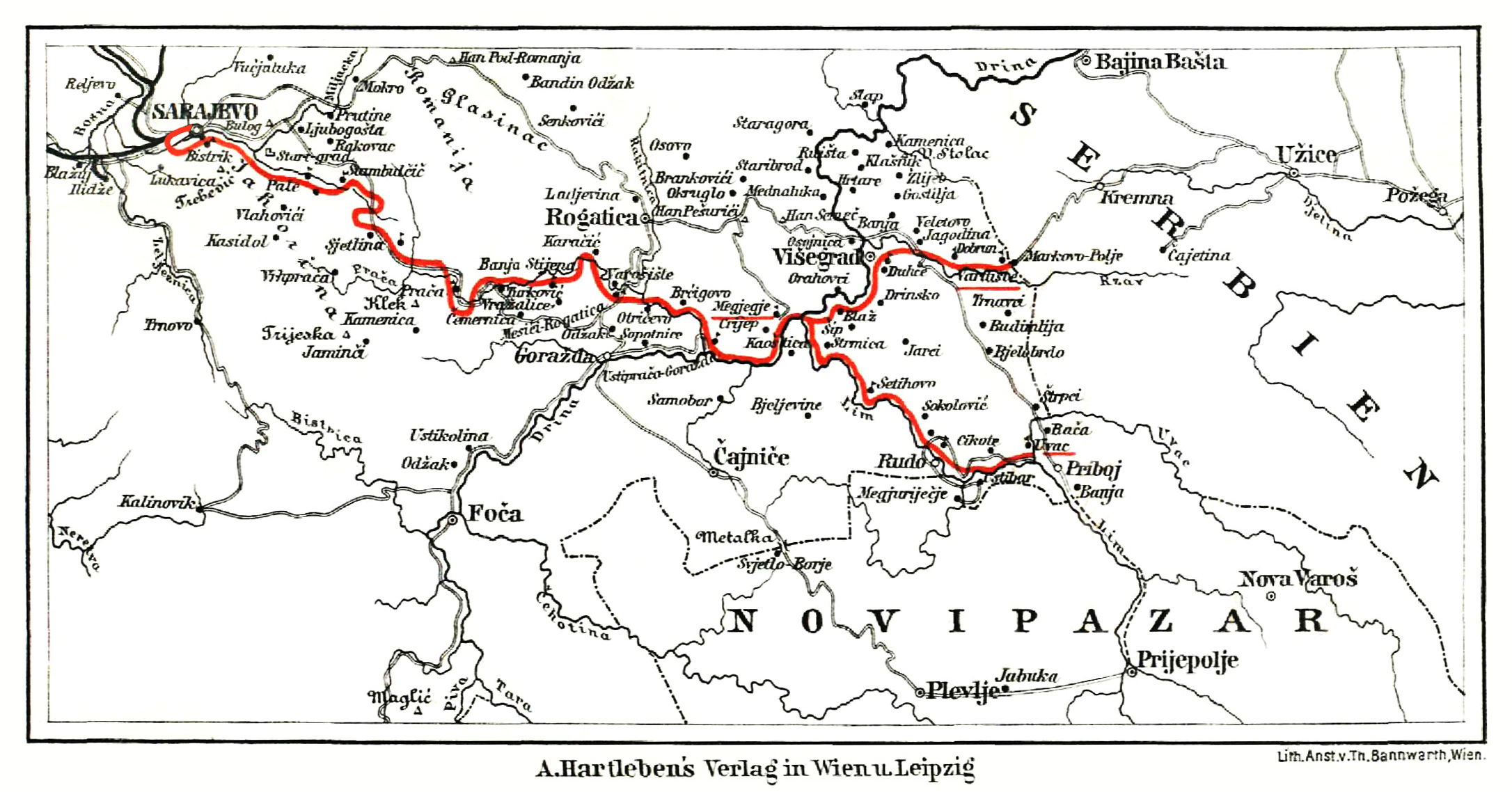
Map of the Bosnian Eastern Railway, from the 1908 book by Milena Mrazović

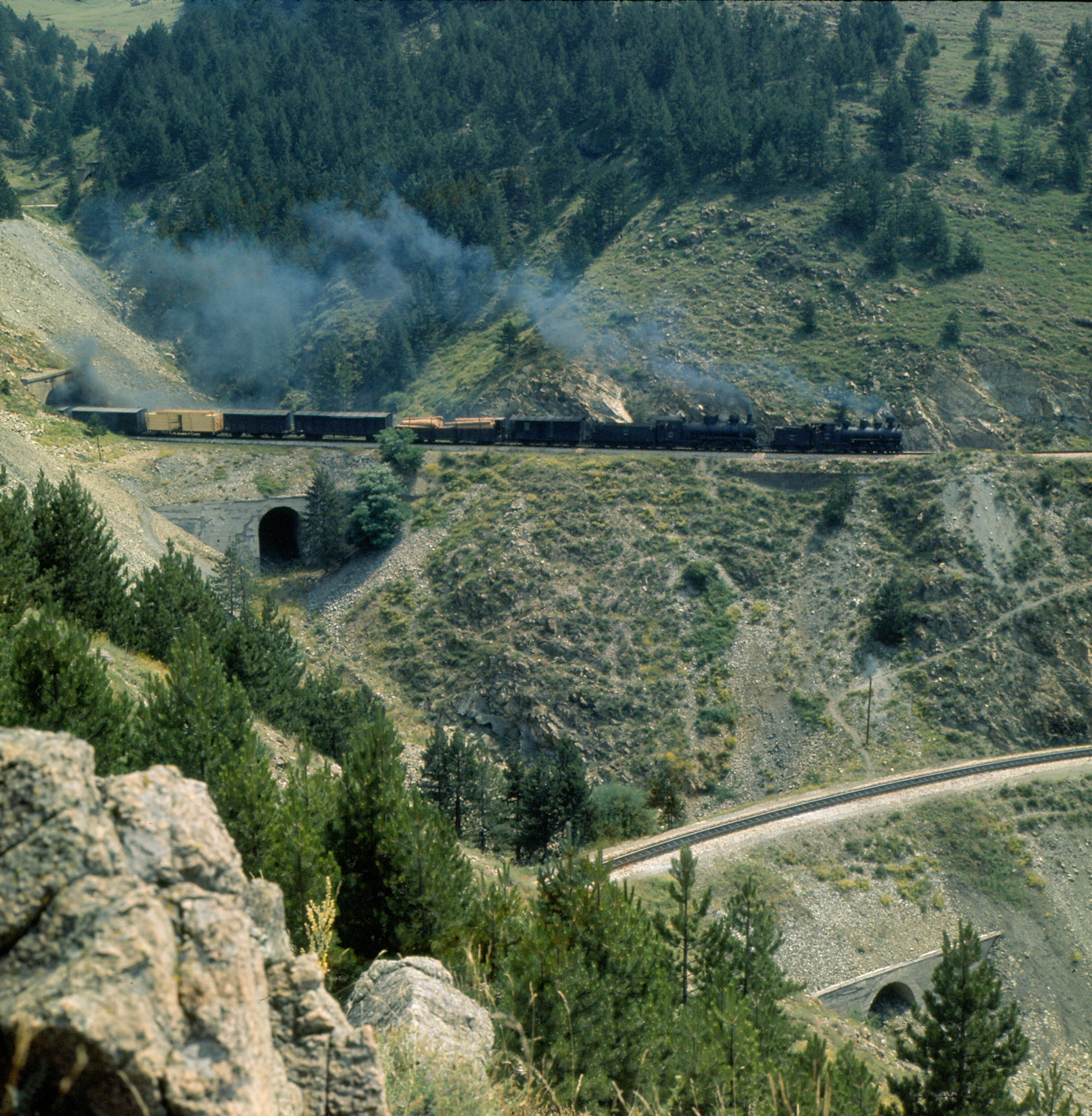
A freight train in 1970

Bosnische Ostbahn (Bosanska istočna pruga) 166.4 km, built 1906.

- Sarajevo–Pale–Prača–Ustiprača–Međeđa–Uvac 137.6 km (Serbian border);
  - Extension Uvac – Priboj, Serbia (built 1929). This line is connected to the Bosna railway and the Narenta railway at Sarajevo.
- Međeđa – Višegrad – Dobrun – Vardište at Serbian border; 28.8 km;
  - Extension Vardište – Mokra Gora – Šargan Vitasi – Užice built in 1925;
    - This extension connected this railroad with the narrow-gauge railroad Užice–Čačak (built 1912); Čačak – Gornji Milanovac (built 1920); Gornji Milanovac – Lajkovac (built 1922); Lajkovac–Obrenovac (built 1908); Obrenovac–Belgrade (built 1928).

=== Upper Drina railway ===
- Ustiprača–Goražde–Foča (built 1939);
  - It had direct connection to the East Bosnian railway in Ustiprača.
  - It was extended in 1946 to Brod na Drini village, which connected it to the forestry narrow-gauge railroad network of "Maglić" forestry conglomerate (railroads to Miljevina and to Tjentište and further on).

In the 1960s, plans were made to regauge the lines to standard gauge. However, this was not realised. On 28 May 1978 the line was closed for commercial traffic.

The track bed is currently very visible in the landscape, with several stations, tunnels still visible. A small part of the track is still in service as a heritage railway rebuilt between 1999 and 2003, Šargan Eight.

== Other ==
There were numerous private industrial and mostly forestry narrow-gauge railroads in operation throughout the late 19th and most of 20th century, with varying construction and deconstruction dates.

Some of them were isolated, while some had direct connections to one of the main state narrow-gauge railroads.

Only some of those railroads are mentioned below.

=== Bosanska Mezgraja–Bijeljina railway ===
Bosanska Mezgraja–Bijeljina–Ugljevik;

An isolated 760 mm (2 ft 5 15/16 in) gauge railway

=== Sinj railway ===
Split–Sinj (completed in Croatia); 40 km, 1903–62. A planned extension via Aržano to Bugojno (and further on existing tracks to Sarajevo) never materialized because of World War I and the line remained isolated from the Bosnian 760 mm (2 ft 5 15/16 in) network.

=== Banovići coal-mine railway ===
A 760 mm (2 ft 5 15/16 in) gauge industrial line opened in 1947 near Tuzla. Still in commercial operation.

== See also ==
- Bosnian-gauge railways
- Narrow-gauge railway
- Narrow-gauge railways in Croatia
- Ohrid line – a narrow-gauge railway in Macedonia
- Narrow-gauge railways in Serbia
