= Tunnel A1 (Ivan) =

- Coordinates: 43°47′31″N 18°00′33″E
- Owner: JP Autoceste BiH

Characteristics
- Design: Tunnel

History
- Construction start: January 2020
- Construction end: October 2022
- Construction cost: €69.56 million (136.23 million BAM)
- Opened: October 31, 2022

Location
- Interactive map of Tunnel A1 (Ivan)

Tunnel A1 (Ivan) is a tunnel part of the A1 motorway in Bosnia and Herzegovina built by Autocesta FBiH. In January 2020 the first digging has been confirmed to have begun in the Herzegovina side of the tunnel. A total of 340,000,000 Euros (664,9 million KM) have been invested in the project to build the tunnel along with 11,4 million Euros for other expenses.

The project is part of newly built A1 motorway section Tarčin-Ivan.

The tunnel was expected to be completed by May 2022.

On October 31, 2022, following the completion of the Tarčin-Ivan motorway section, the tunnel opened along with the newly completed section.
