= Petar Kočić =

Bosnian Serb writer (1877–1916)

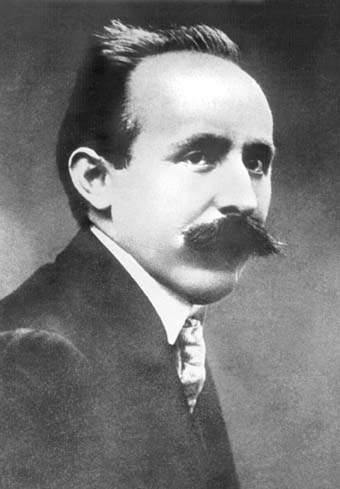
- Born: 29 June 1877; Stričići, Bosnia Vilayet, Ottoman Empire
- Died: 27 August 1916 (aged 39); Belgrade, Kingdom of Serbia
- Resting place: Belgrade New Cemetery, Serbia
- Education: University of Vienna
- Occupations: Writer; playwright; poet; politician
- Spouse: Milka (née Vukmanović)
- Children: 2
- Writing career
- Years active: 1899–1916

Petar Kočić (Serbian Cyrillic: Петар Кочић; 29 June 1877 – 27 August 1916) was a Bosnian Serb writer, activist and politician. Born in rural northwestern Bosnia in the final days of Ottoman rule, Kočić began writing around the turn of the twentieth century, first poetry and then prose. While a university student, he became politically active and began agitating for agrarian reforms within Bosnia and Herzegovina, which had been occupied by Austria-Hungary following the Ottomans' withdrawal in 1878. Other reforms that Kočić demanded were freedom of the press and freedom of assembly, which were denied under Austria-Hungary.

In 1902, Kočić published his first short story collection. He published two more short story collections in 1904 and 1905, and subsequently adapted one of his most successful short stories, The Badger on Trial, for the stage. Kočić subsequently led several demonstrations in Sarajevo and was imprisoned on three occasions for publishing newspaper tracts critical of Habsburg rule. He spent the majority of his imprisonment in solitary confinement, which contributed to his development of depression. In 1909, Kočić was released as part of a general amnesty. The following year, he published his third and final short story collection, and won a seat in the newly created Diet of Bosnia (Sabor), where he became the leader of a faction of anti-Austrian Serb nationalists. He lobbied for increased concessions to Bosnian Serb peasants and farmers, agitating against the Austro-Hungarians as well as the Bosnian Muslim landowning class. He left the Sabor in 1913, citing mental exhaustion. In January 1914, Kočić was admitted into a Belgrade mental hospital, where he died two years later.

Kočić was one of the most important Bosnian Serb politicians of the Austro-Hungarian era, as well as one of Bosnia and Herzegovina's most important twentieth-century playwrights. He was noted for his fiery temperament and sharp wit, which he frequently deployed against the Austro-Hungarian authorities. Kočić's works not only influenced an entire generation of Bosnian intellectuals, such as the future Nobel laureate Ivo Andrić, but also the Serbian and Yugoslav nationalist movements, as well as the Bosnian autonomist and Yugoslav communist movements. Numerous streets in Bosnia-Herzegovina and Serbia carry his name and his likeness has appeared on Bosnian 100 KM banknotes since 1998.

== Early life and education ==
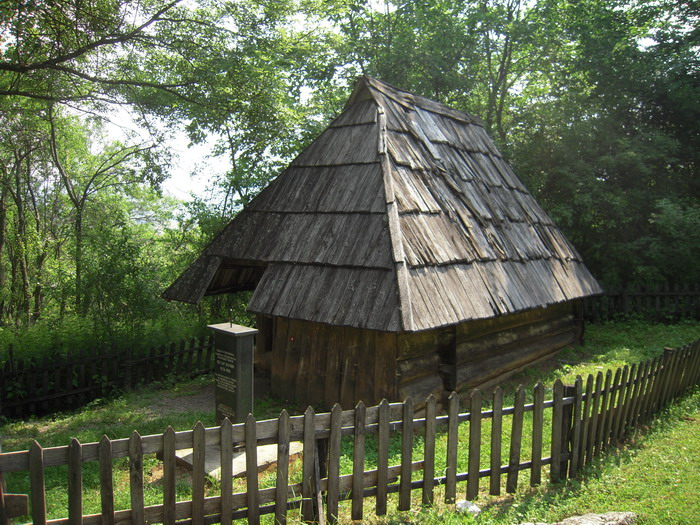
The house in which Kočić was born, Stričići

Petar Kočić was born into a Bosnian Serb family on 29 June 1877 in the hamlet of Stričići, in the Zmijanje region, near Banja Luka in northern Bosnia. His father, Jovan, was an Eastern Orthodox priest and his mother, Mara, was a housewife. Within a year of his birth, the Bosnia Vilayet was occupied by Austria-Hungary, bringing more than four centuries of Ottoman rule to a sudden end. Kočić's father had taken his priestly vows in 1873. In 1879, Kočić's mother died while giving birth to his younger brother Ilija, and his father decided to become a monk at the Gomionica Monastery, where he adopted the monastic name Gerasim.

Following his mother's death, Kočić and his siblings, Milica and Ilija, were sent to live with their extended family in a peasant zadruga. Each member of the zadruga was assigned a particular role. Kočić was tasked with herding livestock. At the time, ninety percent of Bosnia's population was illiterate, and storytelling took on a predominantly oral character, as exemplified by the tradition of the gusle, a one-stringed instrument used to accompany the recitation of epic poetry, which was the primary form of entertainment in Serb peasant communities. Kočić remained illiterate until the age of eleven, when he was dispatched to Gomionica, where his father had since become abbot, to receive basic schooling. Kočić's stay at the monastery, during which he was taught the history of the Serbs and became acquainted with Serbian tradition and lore, left an indelible impression on him, and was to influence his future writing. In 1888, around the time Kočić arrived at Gomionica, his father was arrested by the Austro-Hungarian police for leading a demonstration against Crown Prince Rudolph during a state visit to Banja Luka, and sentenced to seven months' imprisonment.

Kočić left Gomionica after two years and completed his primary education at the Eastern Orthodox religious school in Banja Luka, though he returned to the monastery every summer in order to spend time with his father. Kočić was the best student in his class at the religious school, and upon graduating in 1891, he departed for Sarajevo to attend high school at the First Sarajevo Gymnasium. During his first three years, he excelled in subjects such as mathematics, as well as Greek, Latin, German and Serbo-Croatian, which the Austro-Hungarians deemed the "language of the land" (zemaljski jezik), so as not to become entangled in local ethnolinguistic disputes. Kočić experienced a violent fit in his fourth year, swearing at a theology teacher and throwing a textbook at him over a poor grade. He was dismissed from the classroom and subjected to a monetary fine. According to a classmate, the outburst changed Kočić, "turning him from an ambitious, disciplined student, into a truant and frequenter of kafanas and bars." Following an incident in which a visibly intoxicated Kočić and his friends verbally abused Muslim students in a hotel bar, Kočić was expelled from the Gymnasium. (Note: The incident is said to have started with the singing of nationalistic songs and quickly escalated into a brawl.) He found himself unable to enroll into any of the high schools in Bosnia, having apparently drawn the ire of the Austro-Hungarian authorities. Kočić was forced to continue his education in neighbouring Serbia and enrolled into a Belgrade high school, from which he graduated in 1899.

== Career ==
=== Early writing and activism ===
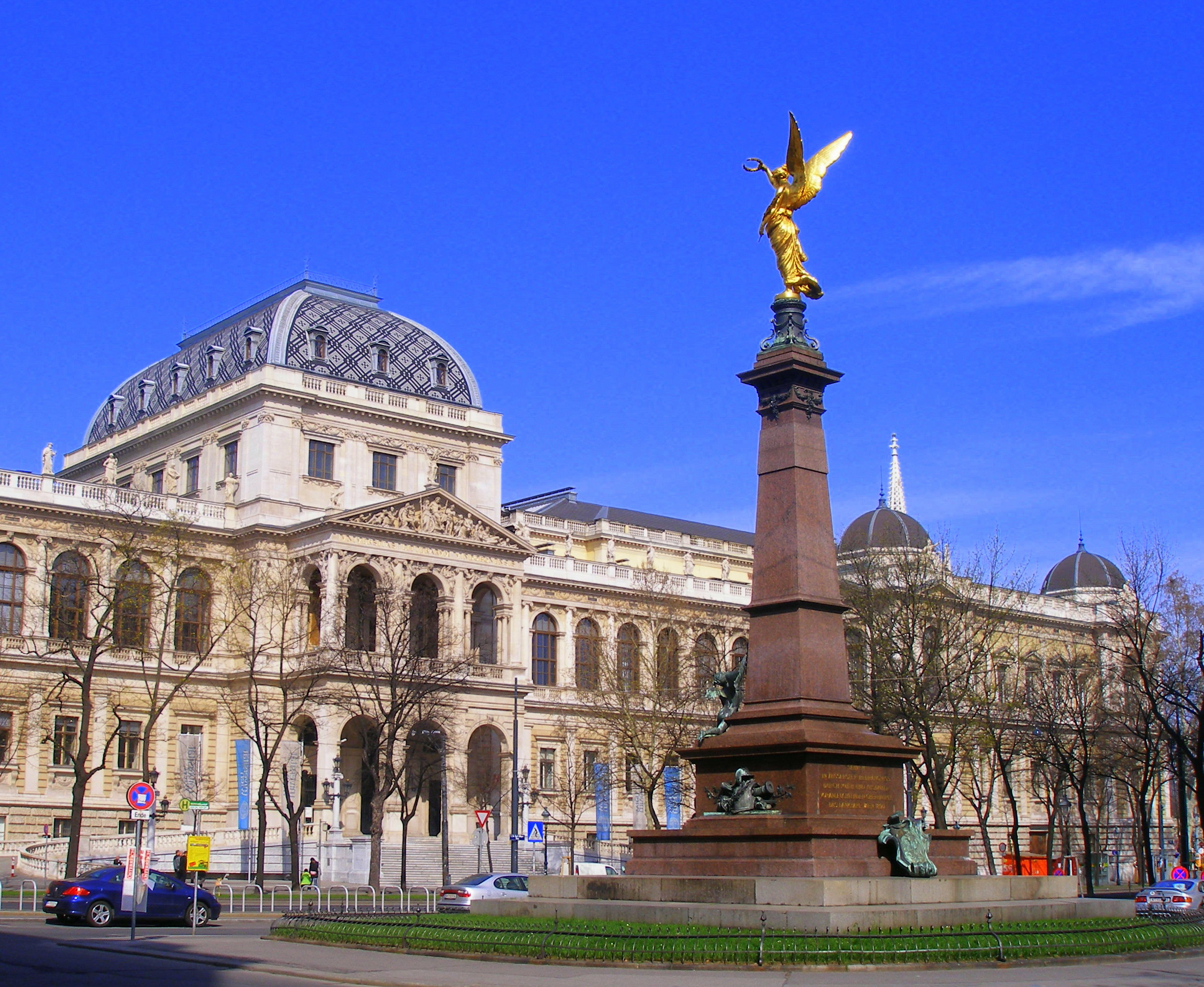
Kočić studied at the University of Vienna between 1899 and 1905

While in Belgrade, Kočić met the writer Janko Veselinović, whose popular short stories and novels romanticized Serbian peasant life. Kočić shared several of his poems with Veselinović, who recommended that he focus on prose instead. Kočić's time in Belgrade was marked by dire poverty. "Although Serbian," he wrote, the city was "a foreign world." Kočić's behaviour became extremely volatile, as exemplified in a letter he wrote his childhood friend and future wife Milka Vukmanović, threatening to kill her and then himself if she married another man. Letters to his father, pressing for money, also struck an abusive and manipulative tone. The notion of suicide began to appear more frequently in his notes. "I will kill myself," he wrote, "to put an end once and for all to all the sufferings and torments that have pursued me from my birth. My life in Banja Luka was hard and dark, in Sarajevo still worse, and in Belgrade, it reached the very climax of suffering." The historian Robin Okey describes such passages as "a reminder of the stresses on young students in this first transition from patriarchalism, particularly without funding when illness and hunger were recurrent."

Frequently homeless, Kočić took to sleeping on the street. One evening, he was woken by a kick to the gut. A policeman stood overhead, swearing and threatening to arrest him. Kočić fled but later recounted that he forgave the policeman because the kick had been administered by "the same soldier who will, sooner or later, carry victorious banners" into Bosnia. Historian Edin Hajdarpašić believes Kočić's response to this incident is emblematic of his nationalist philosophy. "Some roughness from one's co-nationals was understandable," Hajdarpašić writes, "but an 'alien' rule of law was intolerable since it violated, by default, the 'native' national sentiment that Kočić claimed as his position."

In the fall of 1899, Kočić enrolled into the University of Vienna's Department of Slavistics and began writing prose. His first short story appeared in the publication Bosanska vila (Bosnian Fairy) in 1899. Soon, Kočić began taking part in South Slavic student demonstrations on campus, demanding freedom of the press and assembly in Bosnia. Despite living in the city and being well educated, Kočić took up the cause of the Bosnian Serb peasants. Most peasants were kmets, or serfs, and did not own the land they tilled. Though they were no longer legally referred to as serfs from 1878 onwards, their farmland remained the property of the Muslim landowning class, which emerged from the Ottoman withdrawal largely unscathed. Kočić helped produce memoranda outlining the protesters' demands, which attracted the attention of the Austro-Hungarian authorities. Kočić understood that his political views could lead to restrictions being imposed on his liberty, as demonstrated in a letter he wrote Vukmanović in 1901: "I shall spend perhaps the greater part of my life in jails and prisons, because all us students are going to begin a struggle against the [Austrians], who plunder our nation, deprive it of its freedom, and destroy its happiness."

During his stay in Vienna, Kočić joined the Serbian academic society Zora (Dawn). It was here that he met Pavle Lagarić, another aspiring writer. Lagarić recognized Kočić’s literary talents and introduced him to realism, moving him away from the romanticism of Veselinović. Petar adapted to the new style with ease, publishing his first collection of short stories, S planine i ispod planine (From the Mountain and Below the Mountain) in 1902. Kočić first read the drafts of his stories to members of Zora, took note of their comments and concerns, and made changes accordingly. Between 1902 and 1905, Kočić published three volumes of short stories, all under the same title, S planine i ispod planine. Notable among these was Jazavac pred sudom (The Badger on Trial), in which a farmer attempts to sue a badger for eating his crops. Kočić subsequently adapted the story into a one-act play. It premiered at Belgrade's National Theatre on 26 November 1905.

=== Anti-government tracts and imprisonment ===
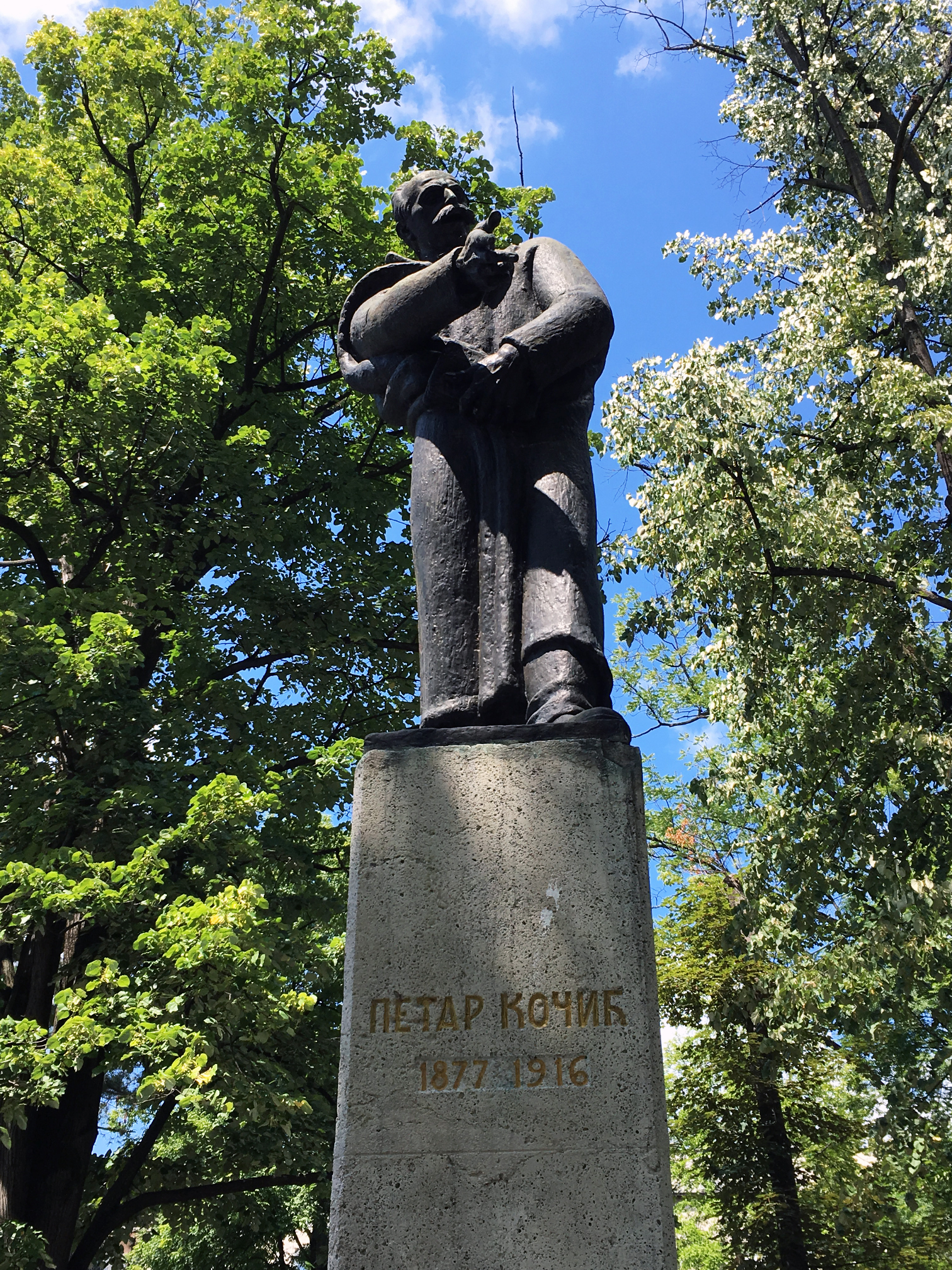
A statue of the writer in Petar Kočić park, Banja Luka

Upon graduating, Kočić left Vienna in April 1904 and returned to northern Bosnia, where he and Vukmanović eloped on 18 September. In February 1905, the two relocated to Skopje, in Ottoman-controlled Macedonia, where Kočić worked as a teacher at a local Serbian-language high school. Upon arriving in Skopje, Kočić was shaken by the news that his father had died. During his stay, he staged the first theatrical performance in the city's history, a stage production of Jazavac pred sudom. Kočić remained in Skopje for less than a year. He made the mistake of writing an article for the Belgrade daily Politika that was critical of the local Serbian archimandrite, prompting his superiors to arrange a transfer to Bitola, which he declined. Kočić and his wife moved back to Vienna, but their stay there proved to be shortlived. Within a year, the couple relocated to Sarajevo, where Kočić became the general secretary of Prosveta (Enlightment), a Serb cultural society. In May 1906, he took part in a province-wide general strike. In his speeches, he drew parallels between the grievances of workers and those of peasants, whose discontent continued to fester, as the average size of their plots had decreased by 11 percent between 1895 and 1910.

Shortly after relocating to Sarajevo, Kočić applied for a license to publish a satirical newspaper called Jazavac (The Badger). Kočić declared that the newspaper would mock "everything that is rotten and sick in our contemporary social life". His request again brought him to the attention of the Austro-Hungarian authorities, who compiled a secret internal memorandum branding him "a fanatical revolutionary" who led "an Austrophobic movement dedicated to organizing a pan-Serbian uprising in Bosnia." In October 1906, Kočić led a student protest against a Bosnian Croat newspaper titled Hrvatski dnevnik (The Croatian Daily), which he had accused of using pejoratives in describing the Bosnian Serbs. (Note: Kočić accused the newspaper's editors of referring to Serbs as "a maffia [sic], arsonists, a robber gang and escapees from the scaffold." One of the newspaper's editors responded that he and his colleagues had been subject to "daily sneers ... at everything which must be holy to us as Catholics and Croats.") The authorities acted quickly against both Kočić and the paper's two editors. The editors, both of whom were from Croatia, were expelled from the province. Kočić was notified that he had 48 hours to leave Sarajevo or face arrest.

He moved back to Banja Luka, but according to biographer Thomas Butler, "the authorities were not satisfied with merely banishing him." In 1907, Kočić applied for a license to publish a newspaper called Otadžbina (Fatherland), which was granted. The first issue appeared on 28 June 1907, during Vidovdan (St. Vitus Day), a holiday of great significance in the Serbian national consciousness marking the anniversary of the Battle of Kosovo. In that issue, Kočić bitterly criticized Austro-Hungarian rule and its negative effect on the peasant, for which he and his managing editor Vasa Kondić were jailed. (Note: Their imprisonment underscored the limits of the Austro-Hungarians' new, purportedly liberalizing press laws. The authorities insisted that while "concrete criticism" of the Habsburg administration was permissible, Kočić's primary objective was to bring the state into "disrepute", and thus a criminal violation.) Kočić was imprisoned inside the Black House, the same prison in which his father had been held. He was first sentenced to two months' imprisonment, but persisted in his recriminations, leading to a second stint in prison that lasted eight months, then a third which lasted fifteen. Kočić spent the majority of his imprisonment in solitary confinement, but sympathetic peasants often appeared at his window and waved at him, which kept his spirits high. Midway through one of his stints in prison, he was transferred to a correctional facility in Tuzla, where he was not allowed to speak to his fellow prisoners or the prison guards. This had a negative effect on his psychological well-being. He slipped into a deep depression and became increasingly worried about the welfare of his wife and child in his absence.

During Kočić’s imprisonment, Austria-Hungary formally annexed Bosnia and Herzegovina. His sentence was commuted in early 1909, as part of a general amnesty for political prisoners. By this time, Kočić’s physical health had also deteriorated. He first returned to his native Stričići, where he rested for two months and collected material for a folk narrative about the history of Zmijanje. The resulting short story collection, titled Jauci sa zmijanja (The Wailing from Zmijanje), was published in 1910.

=== Bosnian Parliament, psychological deterioration and death ===
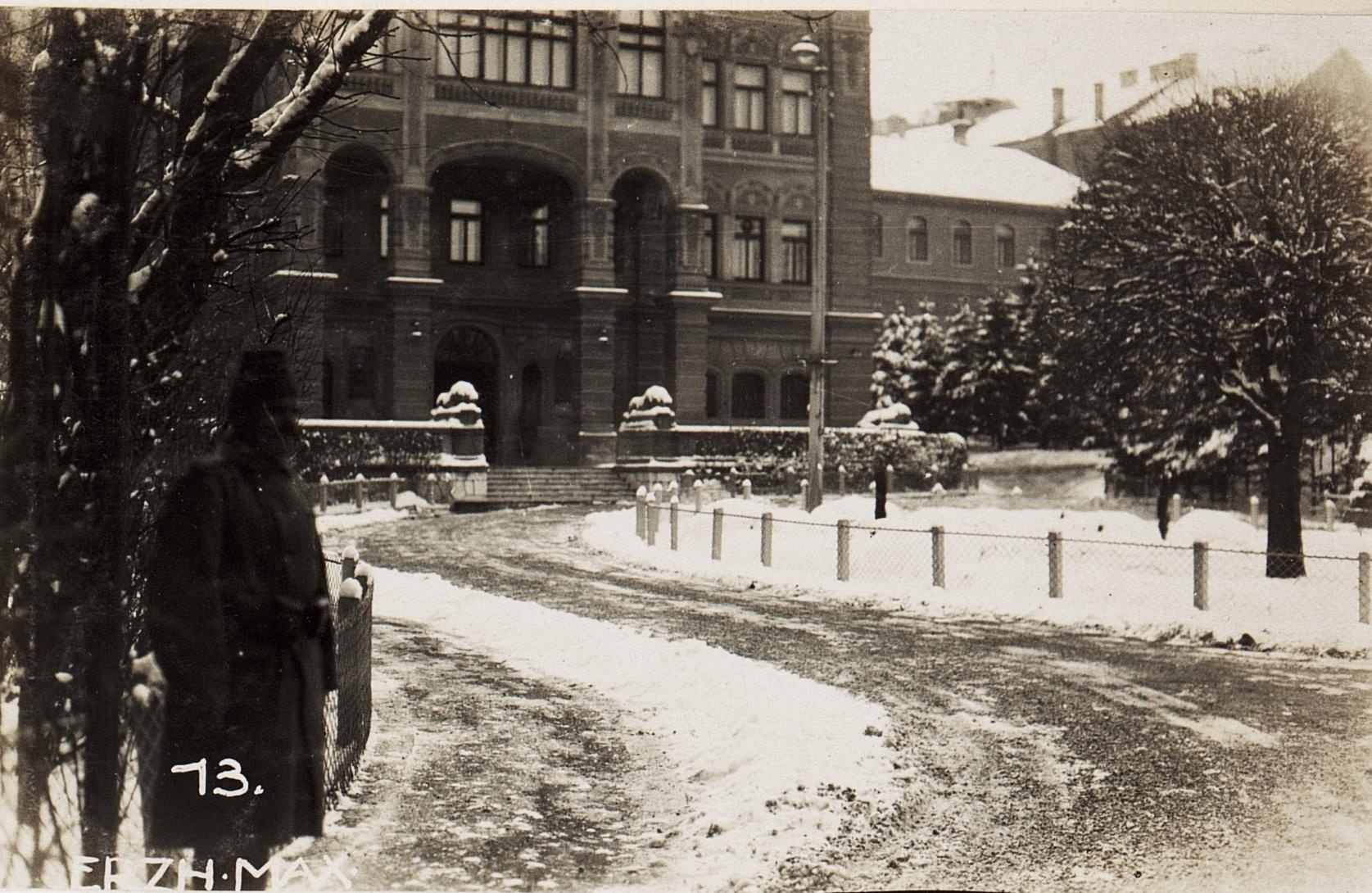
The building of the Diet of Bosnia, 1917

Austria-Hungary allowed for the formation of a Diet of Bosnia (Sabor) in 1910. Kočić ran in the district of Banja Luka as a candidate of the Agrarian Party and won. One senior Austro-Hungarian official described all the Serb members of parliament, with the exception of Kočić, as being "formally loyal" to the Habsburg crown. Other officials were far less restrained in their criticism, branding Kočić a "well-known agitator", "extremist", "proselytizing subversive", "fanatical revolutionary", "destructive influence", "spiritus rector of disaffection", "boundlessly excitable demagogue" and the "most zealous champion of the Great Serb cause".

By 1911, Kočić had relocated to Sarajevo, ready to represent his district. Shortly thereafter, he was appointed to the Administrative and Cultural Council. He wrote little, with the exception of Sudanija (Trials), a dialogue based on his prison experiences, and instead devoted himself to penning fiery speeches to be delivered in the Sabor. The main subjects of these speeches were the agrarian question and forestry rights, both of which disproportionately affected the Bosnian Serb peasantry, Kočić's primary constituents, who made up nearly half of Bosnia and Herzegovina's rural population at the time. During this period, Kočić was one of the two primary proponents of agrarian reform in the province, alongside Lazar Dimitrijević.

Kočić also went about agitating against the Muslim landowning class. The Muslim landlords became one of the primary targets of his speeches, second only to the Austro-Hungarians. "Every kmet's income is taxed," Kočić complained, "while people in towns do not pay any taxes on the interest they get on their money in the banks nor do the feudal lords pay taxes on the one third they obtain from the kmets." Kočić's movement was one of four Bosnian Serb parties in the Sabor, and the only one representing the Serb peasantry. The other three represented city-dwelling Serb nationalists, pan-Slavic Serbs, and pro-Habsburg Serbs. The historian Ivo Banac describes Kočić's followers as "the most uncompromising anti-Austrian Serb nationalists in Bosnia-Herzegovina." Kočić and his followers also had extensive ties to Mlada Bosna (Young Bosnia), a South Slav nationalist student movement calling for an end to Austro-Hungarian rule.

By 1912, the strains of politics were beginning to take a toll on Kočić's mental health, and he vacated his position on the Administrative and Cultural Council the following year. He spent the subsequent months at a resort near Mount Ivan, in central Bosnia, but the state of his mental health remained poor. In January 1914, Kočić was admitted to a Belgrade mental hospital, where he died on 27 August 1916, amid the chaos of World War I and the city's occupation by Austria-Hungary. By some accounts, Kočić committed suicide, but this has been denied by his family. He was survived by his wife Milka and daughter Dušanka, who went on to become a professor. The couple also had a son, Slobodan, who predeceased his father. Kočić's remains were buried at Belgrade's New Cemetery.

== Style and themes ==
Like those of his contemporaries Aleksa Šantić, Vladimir Ćorović and Jovan Dučić, Kočić's writings were greatly influenced by the Nemanjić-Byzantine literary tradition, which was mainly taken up by Serb writers, and primarily dealt with themes from Serbian history, such as the medieval Serbian Empire and the Battle of Kosovo. His stories all bespeak the social and political beliefs to which he adhered. His primary sources of inspiration were Serbian epic poetry and Njegoš's Gorski vijenac (The Mountain Wreath; 1847). Kočić's works were written in his native Ijekavian dialect, primarily spoken west of the Drina.

Powerless peasants standing up to the complex Austro-Hungarian bureaucratic apparatus, usually in court, is a theme that recurs throughout Kočić's works. His stories were often satirical in nature and dealt with the everyday hardships faced by the Bosnian Serb peasantry, mocking the Austro-Hungarian administration and pointing out its flaws. They also had patent didactic overtones. "These features alone," Hajdarpašić writes, "the satirical tone, the complaints about the government, the comparisons to the Turkish yoke, do not stand out as particularly exceptional, suggesting in fact rather narrow targets of Kočić's critique." According to Hajdarpašić, stories such as Jazavac pred sudom "enabled him to encapsulate a wide array of grievances in an accessible and entertaining literary form."

Contemporary critics noted that Kočić's peasant characters deviated from the idyllic representations that were prevalent in 19th-century South Slavic literature, and that his stories instead depicted rural life as strenuous and hard. Kočić was also noted for his extensive use of word play, usually for comedic effect. An example of this can be found in Sudanija, in which the main character, an illiterate peasant named Ćiko Trubajić, incorrectly refers to the paragraphs in the Austro-Hungarian law code using a sociolect, paligrafi ("paligraphs"). In a number of stories, particularly Jazavac pred sudom, Kočić repeatedly mocks the Austro-Hungarians for their poor grasp of Serbo-Croatian. In his speeches before the Sabor, he frequently lambasted the authorities for their supposed corrupting influence on the Serbo-Croatian language. The authority figures who frustrate the powerless Serb peasant's calls for justice are faceless, nameless individuals who have trouble understanding the nuances and subtleties of Balkan life. "Kočić's objections seemed directed not at political oppression as such," Hajdarpašić contends, "but rather specifically against the 'foreign' character of the Habsburg administration."

== Legacy ==
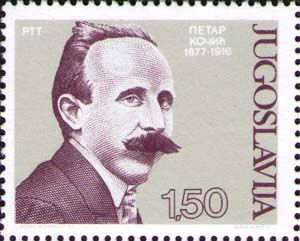
A 1977 Yugoslav commemorative postage stamp

Kočić was one of the most important Bosnian Serb politicians of the Austro-Hungarian era. He was also one of Bosnia and Herzegovina's most important twentieth-century playwrights. Short stories such as Jazavac pred sudom inspired an entire generation of young South Slav workers, farmers and intellectuals to oppose Austro-Hungarian rule. The most notable of these was the writer Ivo Andrić, who was awarded the Nobel Prize in Literature in 1961. Kočić's cause was also taken up by South Slav nationalists such as Gavrilo Princip, the Young Bosnian who assassinated Archduke Franz Ferdinand of Austria in June 1914, precipitating the July Crisis and the outbreak of World War I. Young revolutionaries, Butler writes, "learned from Kočić's example that Bosnia could not be freed through the law and the courts."

The radical land reforms advocated by Kočić only came to fruition after World War I, following the collapse of Austria-Hungary and the creation of the Kingdom of Serbs, Croats and Slovenes, which was later renamed the Kingdom of Yugoslavia. According to the historian Marko Attila Hoare, this caused the Muslim landowning class to further resent the Bosnian Serb peasantry and was one of the contributing factors behind the genocide of hundreds of thousands of Serbs by the Croatian nationalist Ustaše movement during World War II. The appeal of Kočić's political pronouncements among Bosnian Serbs extended across the political spectrum. During World War II, the Serbian nationalist Chetniks and the communist Partisans, both of whose members were predominantly Serbs, upheld Kočić as a hero. This manifested itself in the creation of the "Petar Kočić" Chetnik Detachment, under the command of Uroš Drenović. In Partisan propaganda, Kočić was lauded as an anti-German revolutionary who fought to liberate Bosnia and Herzegovina from foreign domination. During the socialist period, which lasted between 1945 and 1991, Kočić's Serb heritage was deliberately understated in schoolbooks, and schoolchildren were taught to regard him as an exclusively Bosnian historical and literary figure.

Kočić's works witnessed a resurgence in popularity following the breakup of Yugoslavia. During the Bosnian War, Kočić's likeness was used on the obverse of Republika Srpska 5,000 to 500 million dinar notes. In 1998, his likeness began to appear on 100 KM notes issued in Republika Srpska, which became official tender following the Dayton Agreement. Numerous streets in Bosnia-Herzegovina, Serbia and Montenegro bear his name. A Sarajevo street named after Kočić was renamed during the Bosnian War, as part of the Bosniak-dominated central government's plan to reduce the number of city streets named after non-Bosniaks. Before the war, Banja Luka's central library carried Kočić's name, but was later renamed the National Library of Republika Srpska. One of the city's largest parks continues to bear his name; at its centre is a life-sized statue of the writer. Kočić's last months were dramatized in Goran Marković's 2016 film Slepi putnik na brodu ludaka (A Stowaway on the Ship of Fools).

== List of works ==
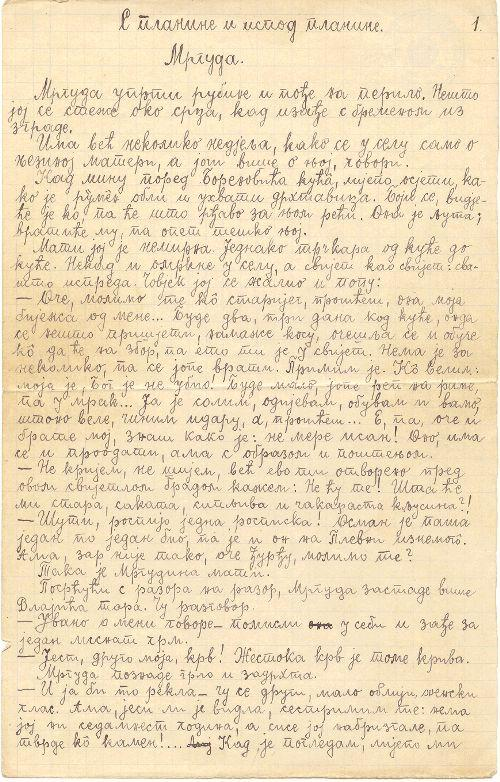
The handwritten first draft of one of Kočić's short stories

Source: Rastko (2017b, Bibliography)

- 1902 S Planine i ispod planine. Srpsko akademsko društvo zora, Vienna (short story collection)
  - Jablan
  - Kod Markanova točka
  - Grob slatke duše
  - Zulum Simeuna Đaka
  - Istiniti zulum Simeuna Đaka
  - Đurini zapisi
  - Mrguda
- 1904 S Planine i ispod planine. Srpska štamparija, Zagreb (short story collection)
  - Uspomeni genija Đure Jakšića
  - Jelike i omorike
  - Kroz maglu
  - Mračajski proto
  - Jazavac pred sudom
- 1905 S Planine i ispod planine. Taletova štamparija, Belgrade (short story collection)
  - Iz starostavne knjige Simeuna Đaka
  - Mejdan Simeuna Đaka
  - Rakijo, majko!
  - Sa zbora
  - Jajce
  - Pjesma mladosti
  - U magli
- 1910 Jauci sa zmijanja. Srpska štamparija, Zagreb (short story collection)
  - Zmijanje
  - Molitva
  - Vukov Gaj
  - Kroz mećavu
- 1911 Sudanija. Islamska dioničarska štamparija, Sarajevo (dialogue)
