= Kusače =

Kusače may refer to:

- Kusače (Han Pijesak)
- Kusače (Sokolac)
