= Railway Museum, Belgrade =

Railway museum in Nemanjina, Belgrade, Serbia

Railway Museum
- Железнички музеј Železnički muzej
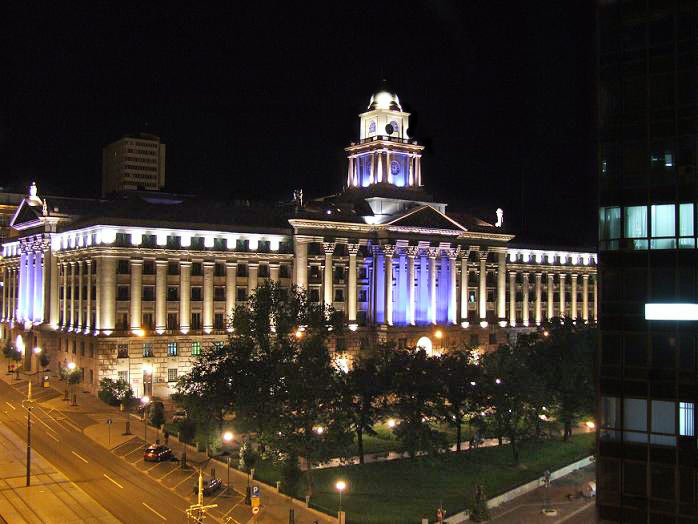
- Established: 1 February 1950; 76 years ago
- Location: Nemanjina 6, Belgrade
- Coordinates: 44°48′22″N 20°27′31″E
- Type: Railway museum

The Railway Museum (Serbian: Železnički muzej / Железнички музеј) is a museum located in the Savski Venac, Belgrade, the capital of Serbia.

== History ==
It was founded on 1 February 1950. The first exhibition was held in 1953 under title "Through the history of Yugoslav Railways" (Kroz istoriju Jugoslovenskih Železnica). Museum is in possession of over 40,000 objects and also has an archive and library. It also operates the Šargan Eight narrow gauge heritage railway, running from the village of Mokra Gora to Šargan Vitasi station. As of 2018, it is managed by the company Serbian Railways.

== Gallery ==
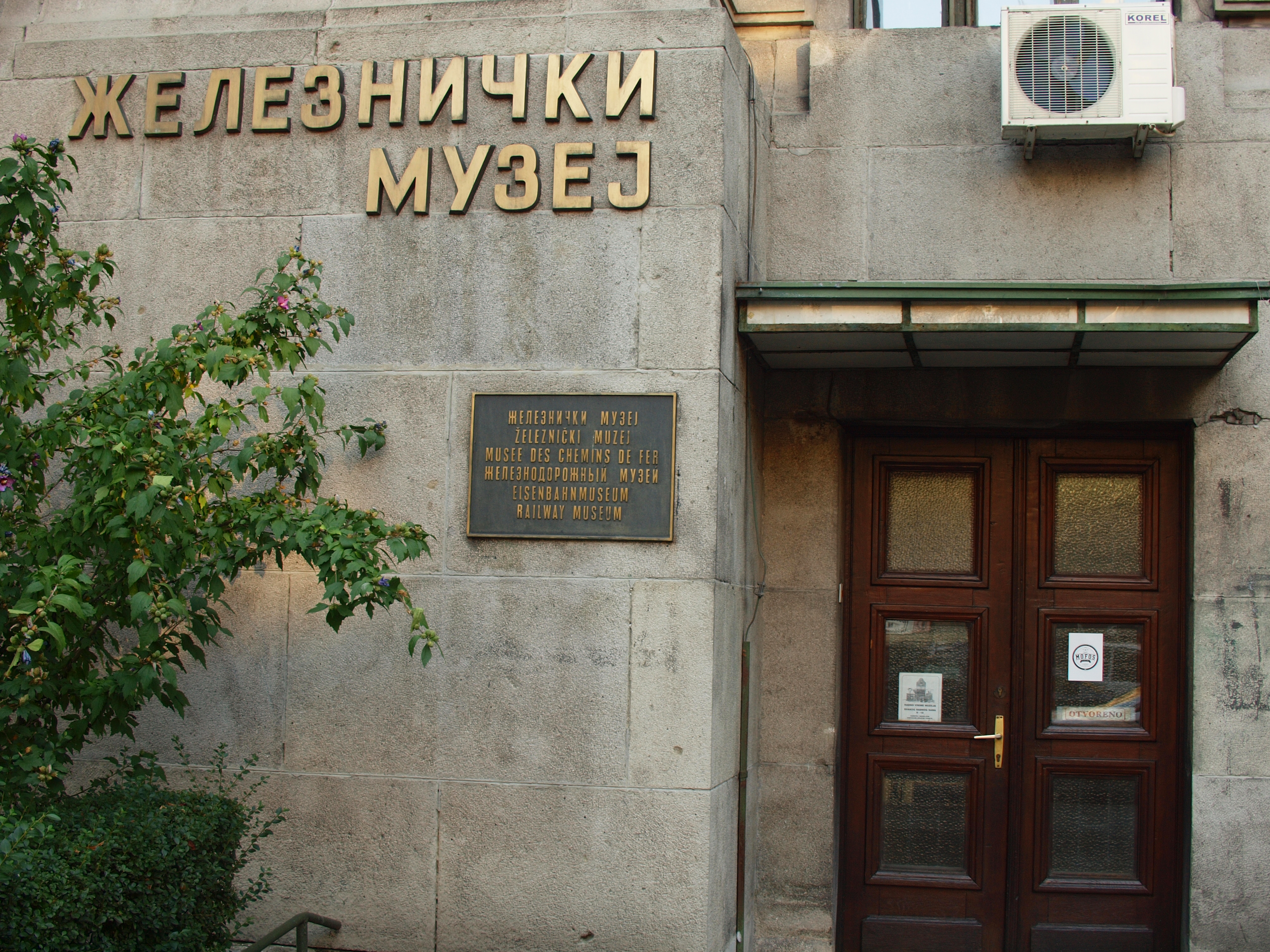
Entrance to Railway Museum

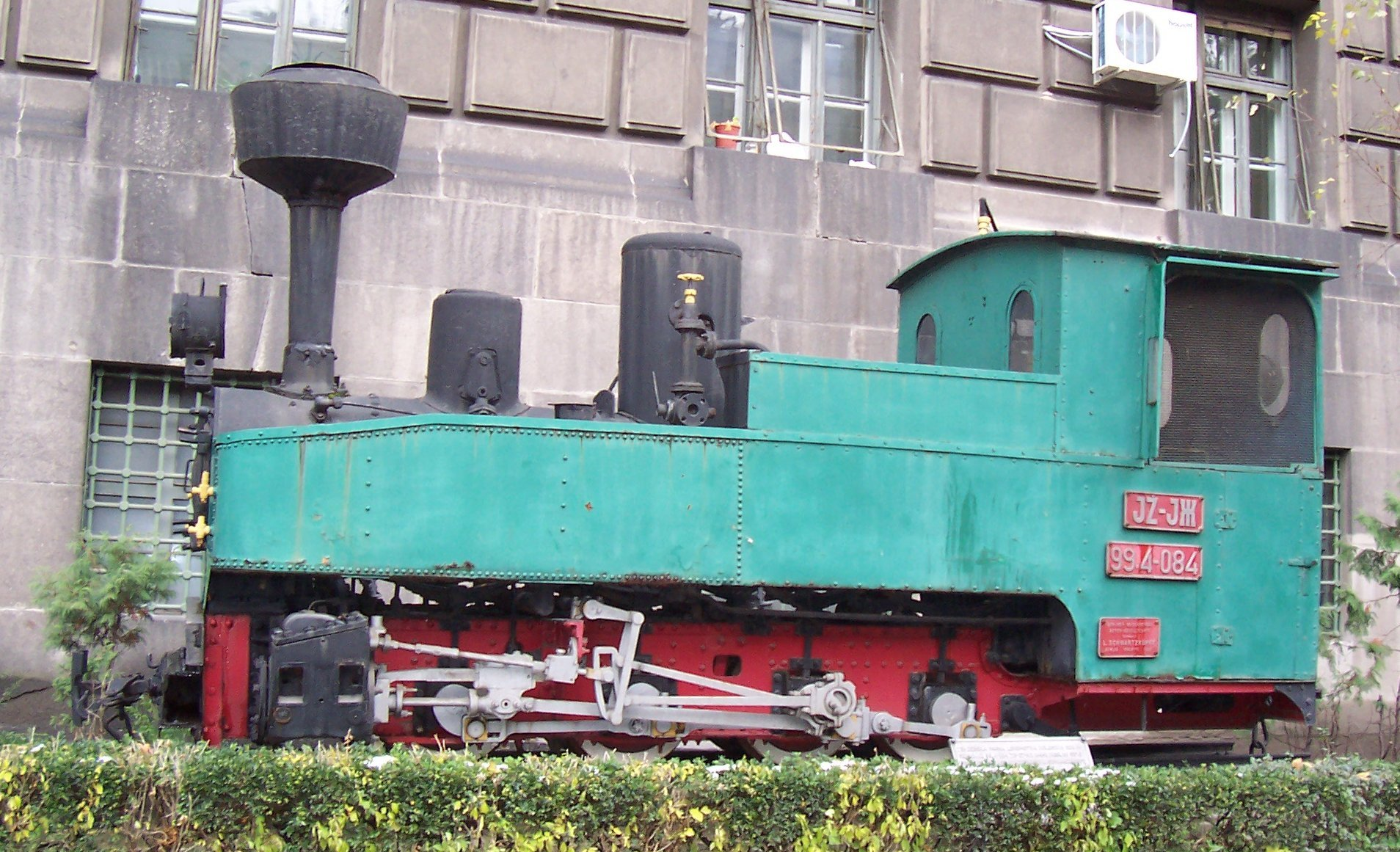
JŽ class 99.4.084 Brigadelok from the 600 mm Ohrid line

== See also ==
- List of museums in Serbia
