= Ohrid line =

Defunct railway line in North Macedonia

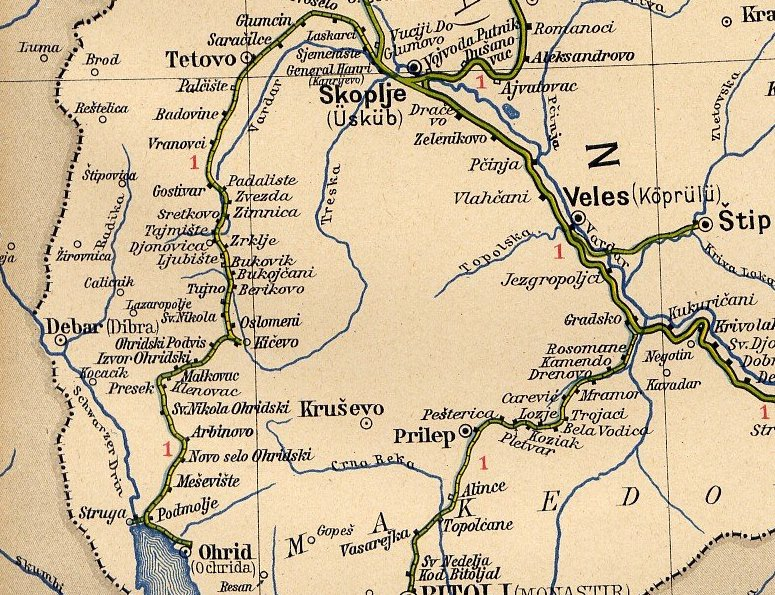

The Ohrid line was a narrow-gauge railway line in what is now the Republic of North Macedonia. It ran to a gauge of 600 mm (1 ft 11 5/8 in).

The route was: Skopje–Gostivar–Kičevo–Podmolje–Ohrid, a distance of 167 kilometres (104 mi).

The section from Skopje–Gostivar was converted to standard gauge in the 1950s. The remaining 600 mm lines were closed altogether in 1966. The standard-gauge line now runs as far as Kičevo.

Immediately before World War I, the area of Vardar Macedonia was part of Serbia, rather than Austria-Hungary. During the war it came under Bulgarian occupation. The railway was built as part of a military railway during this occupation and so was built to the Bulgarian 600 mm Feldbahn standards, rather than the 760 mm Bosnian gauge of the Austro-Hungarian railways that would later become so well known as part of narrow-gauge railways in Yugoslavia. Construction of the 600 mm line between Gradsko and Drenovo began on 26 February 1916. Construction of the Ohrid line began that summer and by 1923 the line ran from the General Hanris station (today Gorce Petrov) (Note: Gorce Petrov station, 42.017°N 21.365°E) on the western edge of Skopje, through to Ohrid.

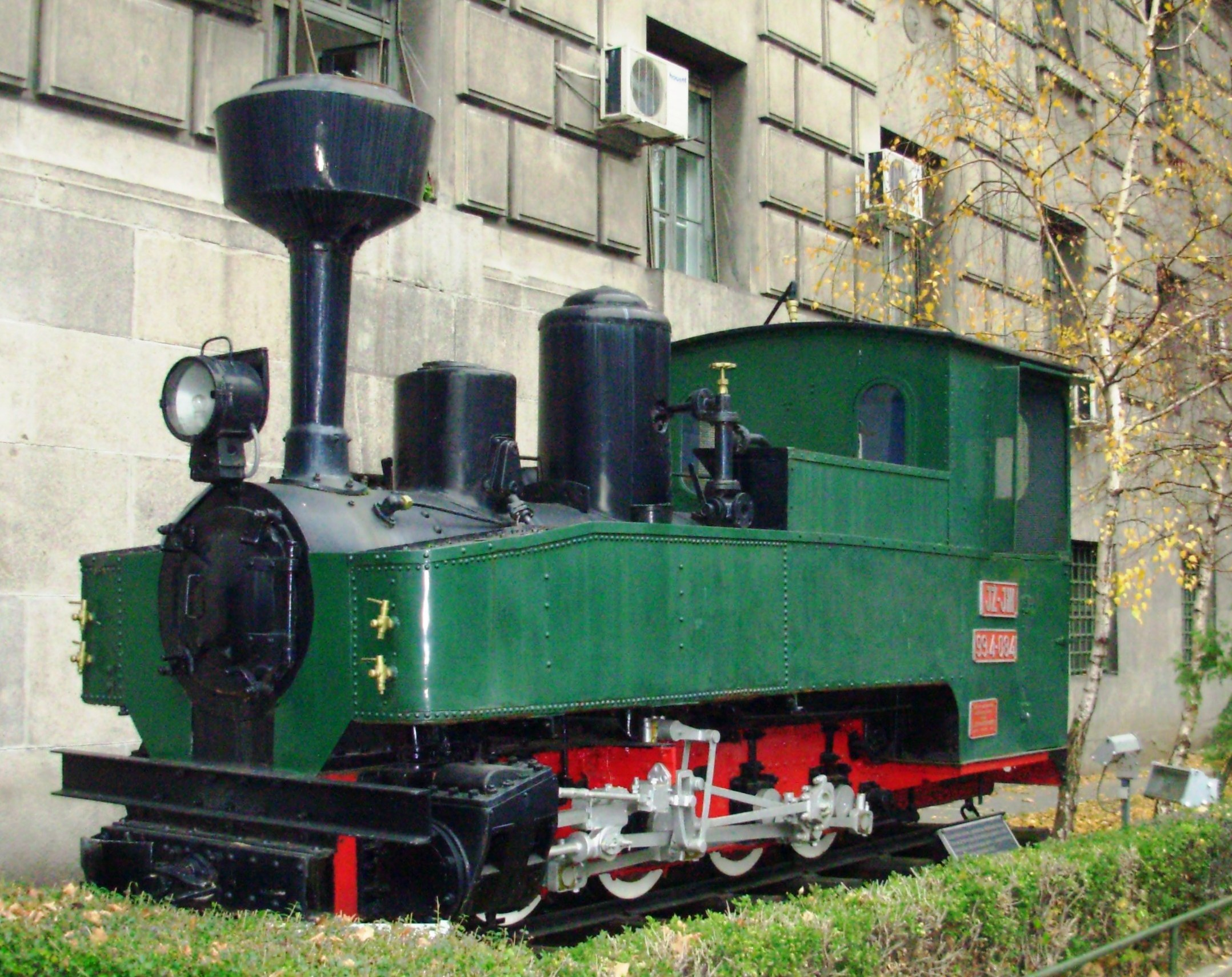
Brigadelok 99.4.084, now outside the railway Museum, Belgrade

The railway was operated by a number of 0-8-0T Brigadelok from German Heeresfeldbahn, described as the JŽ 99.4 class.

1948, the beginning of the separatist Informbiro period, was a period of new investment in the line. The line to Kičevo was lifted and relaid as standard gauge, opening to Gostivar on 25 May 1952, and Kičevo in 1969. Conversion beyond this, to Ohrid, never took place, and by this point the narrow-gauge line had been closed.

One Brigadelok and three coaches are preserved outdoors at Kičevo. (Note: JŽ 99.4-053, Henschel 0-8-0T 15079 of 1917 41.5126°N 20.951°E) 99.4.084 is outside the railway museum in Belgrade. Another locomotive, 99.4.025 (Vulkan 3129 of 1917) was preserved for some years at the Lisice depot, in south-eastern Skopje.

In the 1930s, the Italians considered this route for part of an integrated rail route from the Adriatic coast in Albania to the west of Lake Ohrid, through Podmolje and on to Tetovo and Skopje. In the 21st century, Albanian rail services ran as far as Pogradec, on the southern coast of the lake. Plans have been discussed to link this through to the old Ohrid route, and further to Skopje, although this now appears unlikely.

== See also ==
- 2 ft and 600 mm gauge railways
- Narrow-gauge railways in Bosnia and Herzegovina
- Narrow-gauge railways in Albania
