= Kaldrma =

Kaldrma Калдрма (Serbian)
- Village
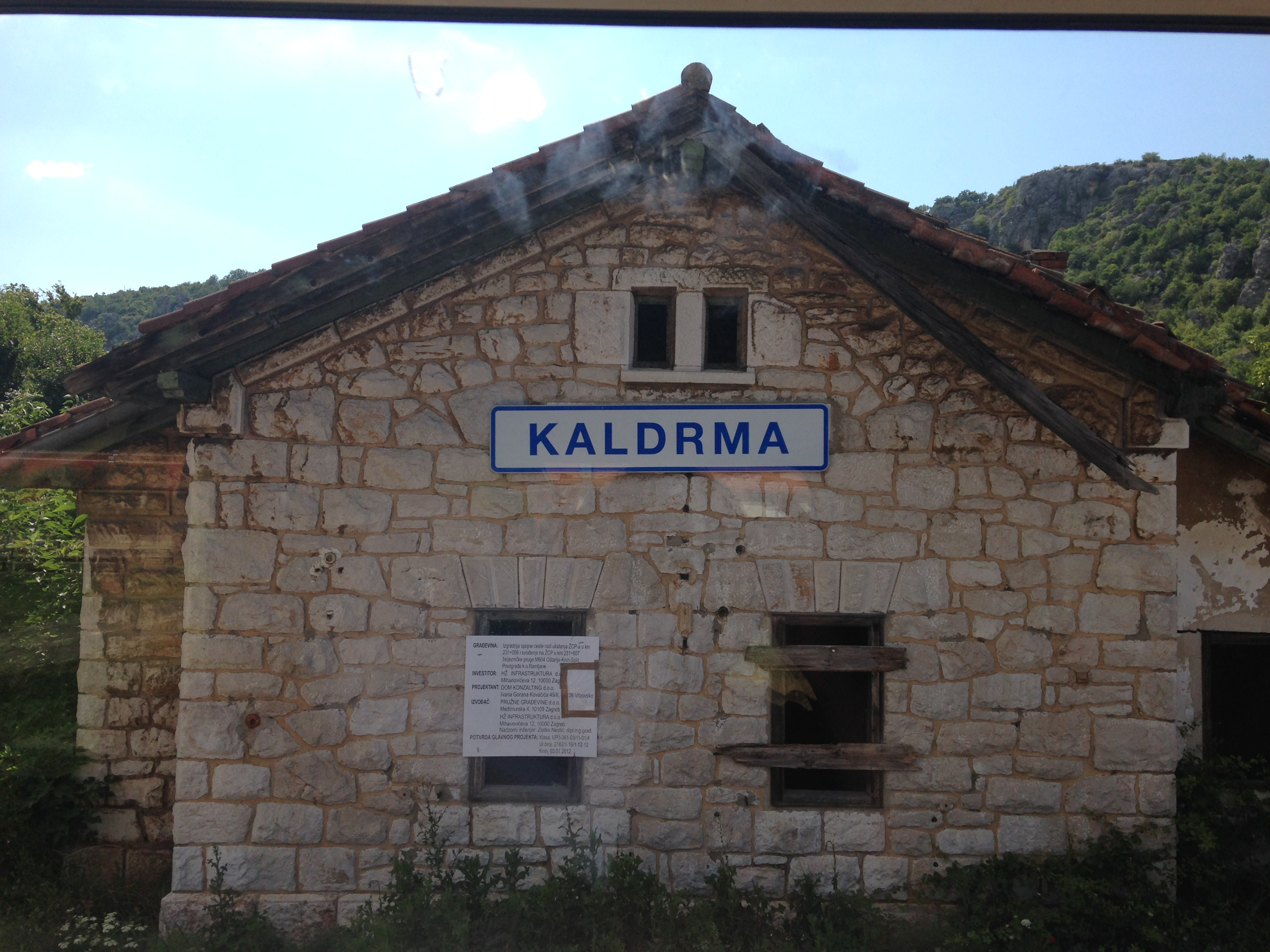
- Kaldrma, railway station

- Location within Croatia
- Coordinates: 44°18′44″N 16°11′21″E
- Country: Croatia
- County: Zadar County
- Municipality: Gračac

Area
  - Total: 4.1 km^{2} (1.6 sq mi)
- Elevation: 679 m (2,228 ft)

Population (2021)
  - Total: 20
  - Density: 4.9/km^{2} (13/sq mi)
- Time zone: UTC+1 (CET)
  - Summer (DST): UTC+2 (CEST)
- Postal code: 23446 Kaldrma
- Area code: +385 (23)

Kaldrma (Serbian Cyrillic: Калдрма) is a village located in the Gračac municipality within the Zadar County in Croatia.

== Population ==
According to the 2011 census, Kaldrma had 31 inhabitants.

Population
1857	1869	1880	1890	1900	1910	1921	1931	1948	1953	1961	1971	1981	1991	2001	2011
246	252	192	219	239	268	230	281	181	189	212	209	193	175	23	31

=== 1991 census ===
According to the 1991 census, settlement of Kaldrma had 175 inhabitants, which were ethnically declared as this:

Kaldrma
1991
total: 175
1. Serbs 173 (98.8%)
2. Yugoslavs 2 (1.14%)

=== Austro-Hungarian 1910 census ===
According to the 1910 census, settlement of Kaldrma had 268 inhabitants in 2 hamlets, which were linguistically and religiously declared as this:

Population by language	Croatian or Serbian
Kaldrma	182
Zavlaka	86
Total	268 (100%)

Population by religion	Eastern Orthodox
Kaldrma	182
Zavlaka	86
Total	268 (100%)

== Transport ==
=== Railway ===
Kaldrma railway station was built on the Oštrelj-Drvar-Knin narrow-gauge railway in 1902. The so-called Steinbeiss Railway, built mainly to service the fledgling timber industry, branched off past Drvar, further to Jajce and Prijedor. After WWII, in 1948 the Knin-Kaldrma section was upgraded to a normal gauge in order to become a part of a new Una railway, an important rail link between Zagreb and Dalmatia. Old narrow-gauge line towards Drvar branched off from Una railway in Kaldrma. While other narrow-gauge sections further east were gradually closed, amidst heavy lobbying and protests from locals, Kaldrma kept its old link to Drvar until May 28, 1978, when the last train arrived from Drvar to Kaldrma station. In 1987, Una railway was electrified.

Traffic on Una railway was only sporadic during the Croatian War of Independence (1991–1995) due to the breakaway Serb Krajina blockade. After 1995, traffic was not reintroduced due to the damage and difficulties concerning numerous border crossings on the line.

== Nature ==
A lake situated northwest from Kaldrma railway station is believed to be a rare example of bifurcation; namely, some of the lake's water ends up in the Black Sea via Una river, while some of it flows into the Adriatic Sea via Krka river.

== Literature ==
- Savezni zavod za statistiku i evidenciju FNRJ i SFRJ, popis stanovništva 1948, 1953, 1961, 1971, 1981. i 1991. godine.
- Knjiga: "Narodnosni i vjerski sastav stanovništva Hrvatske, 1880-1991: po naseljima, author: Jakov Gelo, izdavač: Državni zavod za statistiku Republike Hrvatske, 1998., ISBN 953-6667-07-X, ISBN 978-953-6667-07-9;
