= Stričići =

Stričići Стричићи (Serbian)
- Village (Selo)
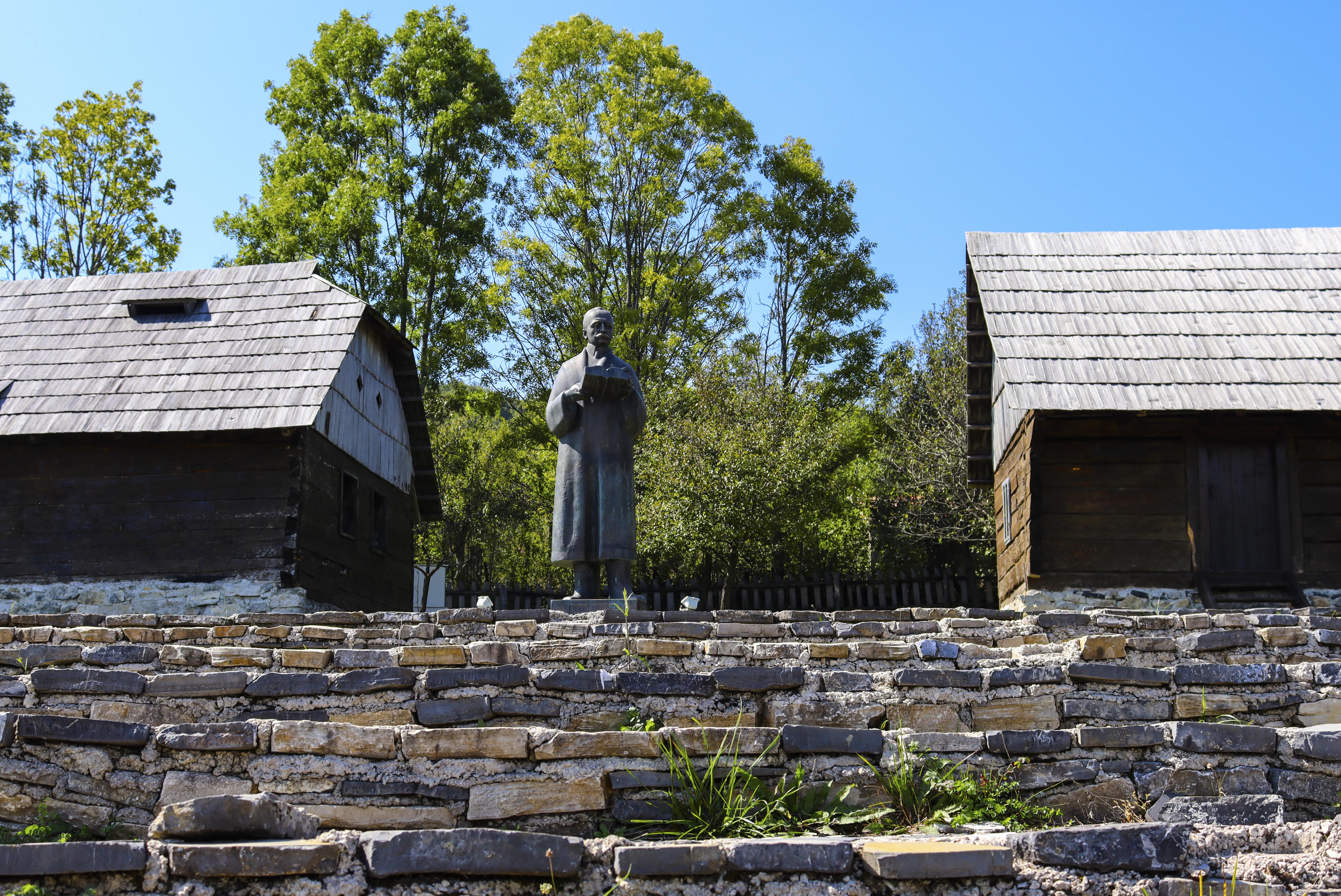

- Location within Bosnia and Herzegovina
- Coordinates: 44°34′39″N 17°04′00″E
- Country: Bosnia and Herzegovina
- Entity: Republika Srpska
- Municipality: Banja Luka

Population (2013)
  - Total: 229
- Time zone: UTC+1 (CET)
  - Summer (DST): UTC+2 (CEST)

Stričići (Serbian Cyrillic: Стричићи) is a village in the municipality of Banja Luka, Republika Srpska, Bosnia and Herzegovina.

== See also ==
- Petar Kočić
