= Narrow-gauge railways in Serbia =

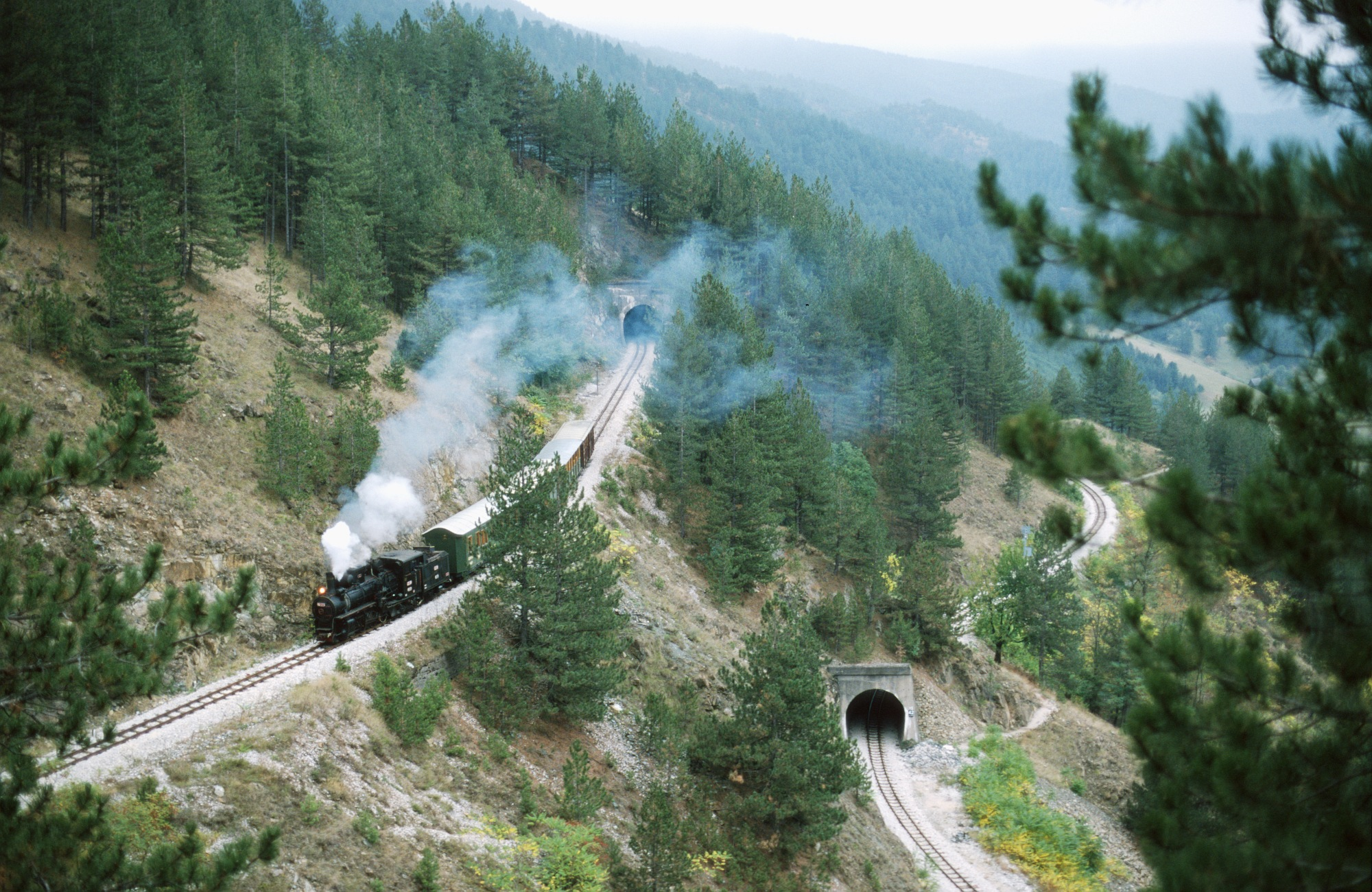
Šargan Eight railroad

Most Serbian railway lines were built as a result of an expansion of railway networks by Austro-Hungarians. Several 760 mm (2 ft 5 15/16 in) gauge railways were planned to link the extensive narrow-gauge railways in the Austro-Hungarian Empire with those in Bosnia and Herzegovina. Until the outbreak of the Balkan Wars in 1912 several of these were constructed, the first ones in Eastern Serbia:

== Closed lines ==
Serbian railway (narrow-gauge) network began to develop in the 1880s.

- In 1882, a primarily industrial, though occasionally used for passenger transport, 12 km long 600 mm wide gauge track from Majdanpek copper processing plant to Velike Livade built by the "Serbian Copper & Iron Co" (official name in English, most stock holders were British). First run on the track was in June 1882.
- In 1888, the 82 km long dual purpose (industrial and passenger transport) 760 mm gauge track from Vrška Čuka mine to the port of Radujevac on the Danube, built by the Societé Anonyme "L'Industrielle Serbe" registered at Brussels in Belgian, French, (Austro-)Hungarian, and Serbian ownership (in order of the percentage of stock owned).,
- In 1892, primarily for coal transport, but also for passenger service, 31.2 km long 750 mm wide line from Ćuprija to Senjski Rudnik was built. In 1908, extended to Ravna Reka and widened to now standard 760 mm Bosnian-gauge. The line was closed partially in 1962, and completely in 1967.

In the 1920s the network was extended from Bosnia and Herzegovina to Belgrade.

- Boljevac–Metovnica–Zajecar; 42 km, closed 1980
- Šabac–Banja Koviljača narrow-gauge railway in Western Serbia, opened in 1910. In 1950 the railway was replaced with a standard gauge line, the old narrow-gauge line was used for its construction and closed after completion.
- Sarajevo–Belgrade narrow-gauge railway, the Bosnian part closed in 1974, the last common carrier traffic on the Serbian part of the railway was the Lajkovac–Mladenovac line which ceased activities in 1983.
- Priboj, a terminus station on a branch line of the Bosna Railway from Bosnia and Herzegovina.
- Zrenjanin–Jimbolia narrow-gauge railway, 68 km, 1899–1968. Had a short tramway section in Zrenjanin, which was closed in 1932. Redirected to Srpska Klarija (now part of Radojevo) after World War 1.

== Šargan Eight ==
The Šargan Eight is Serbia's only narrow-gauge railroad line in service, albeit as a heritage railway. It operates passenger travel from Mokra Gora to Šargan. Originally, the Šargan Eight connected Serbia with Bosnia and Herzegovina (Belgrade-Sarajevo line) when it was first constructed in 1916; the original link extended all the way to Višegrad. Today, however, the train only uses 9.6 miles of track on its trips from Mokra Gora to Šargan, reconstructed in 2003 and in service since then.

== Kolubara ==
In Veliki Crljeni and Vreoci there is a private narrow-gauge railway that is used to transport coal from the Kolubara Mine to the Kolubara Thermal Power Plant (A). There is no passenger service on this line as the line is used only for cargo and freight. Unlike the Šargan Eight, the Kolubara narrow-gauge line is electrified. There is very little information about the railway, but a historical note is that the railway uses about 5.95 km of the old route from the old Mladenovac-Lajkovac narrow-gauge railway. The gauge of the track is a mixed gauge although the true width is unknown.
