= Srnetica =

Srnetica Срнетица
- Village
- Location within Bosnia and Herzegovina
- Coordinates: 44°27′11″N 16°35′52″E
- Country: Bosnia and Herzegovina
- Entity: Republika Srpska
- Municipality: Istočni Drvar

Area
  - Total: 7.98 sq mi (20.67 km^{2})
- Elevation: 3,440 ft (1,050 m)

Population (2013)
  - Total: 0
  - Density: 0.0/sq mi (0.0/km^{2})
- Time zone: UTC+1 (CET)
  - Summer (DST): UTC+2 (CEST)

Srnetica (Serbian Cyrillic: Срнетица) is a desolate village in the municipality of Istočni Drvar (East Drvar), Bosnia and Herzegovina. It lies in western Bosnia, in the part of municipality of Drvar awarded to Republika Srpska, at a mountain saddle about 1050 metres above sea.

From the beginning of 20th century to 1975, there was a main junction of forest narrow-gauge railways built by AG Otto Steinbeis. The tracks are now dismantled and transformed into paths.

== Demographics ==
According to the 2013 census, its population was nil.
