= Šargan Eight =

Coordinates: 43.8000°N 19.5220°E

- Map of the railway

Overview
- Termini: Mokra Gora; Šargan Vitasi

Technical
- Track gauge: 760 mm (2 ft 5 15/16 in)

The Šargan Eight (Serbian: Шарганска осмица / Šarganska osmica) is a narrow-gauge heritage railway in Serbia, running from the village of Mokra Gora to Šargan Vitasi station. The modern line was restored on 1 September 2003. An extension to Višegrad in the Republika Srpska, Bosnia and Herzegovina, was finished on 28 August 2010. It was planned to extend the railway to the village of Kremna by the end of 2011, and in 2013 to extend to the city of Užice, but this was only partially carried out.

"Museum-Tourism Complex Šargan Eight" within the Serbian Railways, which administers the railway, is seated in Mokra Gora. In 2021, Mokra Gora was declared one of the best tourism villages in the world by the United Nations World Tourism Organization.

== History ==
=== Origin ===
Construction began during World War I and the plan was to connect Serbia with Austro-Hungary, which occupied both Serbia and Bosnia and Herzegovina at the time. Šargan was located 9 km (5.6 mi) away from the pre-war border. The Austrians hastily piled the materials needed for the construction and enlisted numerous Russian and Italian prisoners of war in order to speed up the construction as they were in the hurry. Plans were drafted in 1916 and the original, Austrian route differed from the later finished one. They were planning to connect the final station on the Bosnian side, Donje Vardište, to Užice, final station on the Serbian side, which was reached by the railway in 1912. The originally projected route went through the upstream depression, gorges and defiles, or roughly where today the Užice-Višegrad road goes today. It was to swirl along the Kamešina river almost to the top of Šargan.

Digging was extremely hard. Despite so many water sources, the slopes of the Šargan were barren and infested with snakes. The local population called the mountain rocks kremenjak (flint) as it sparks when hit by the pickaxe. Originally, works started along the river, and was several meters above the present route, as evident by the remaining bridge across the Beli Rzav at Kotroman. The original, higher bridge, was built by the Austrians and demolished when the railway was finished after the war and the lower bridge was built, leaving the concrete foundation of its right section. The lower bridge was demolished by the occupying German forces during their withdrawal in the late 1944.

From the station in Mokra Gora, the Austrians conducted the railway across the village cemetery in Markovo Polje. Despite begging from the local population to leave the cemetery alone, Austrian engineers and technicians were marking the route by digging wooden sticks next to the graves and tombstones. They were followed by the workers who were then digging the remains out of the graves. The cemetery was split in two, and remains so to this day, though the tracks were never operational.

From the cemetery, tracks continue to lead along the valley of the Kamešina river and then disappear. Next to this ending are walls, which were used to dam the river. Tracks resurface later, continuing up the Šargan, reaching the Budim hill. In 1916, after an explosion during the digging of the "Budim" tunnel, the ceiling collapsed killing the entire shift of workers. Between 150 and 200 Italian and Russian prisoners were killed. After this, the Austrians quit further works on the construction of the railway. They placed a small memorial to mark the disaster. Today, the locality is on the route and is called Deveti Kilometar ("ninth kilometer"), because 9 kilometres (5.6 mi) of tracks were built before the disaster.

=== Yugoslavia ===
The works were halted and were only continued in 1921, in the newly formed Kingdom of the Serbs, Croats and Slovenes. They officially continued on 1 March 1921. This is when the "eight" was designed and built, as an attractive and practical example of mastering the major attitude changes on short tracks. A descent of 300 m (980 ft) was surmounted with the tracks which curve in the shape of 8, hence the name. The track is 15.44 km (9.59 mi) long and due to the curvature, on some sections the train passes twice through the same points. The railway's 8-shape is best visible from the Krst station, though it appears as two separate railways, on two levels. An operational center was set, which hosted the workers. Three temporary cableways were constructed, for lifting the materials needed during the construction. Surrounding villages blossomed. Aside from wages received by the locals who were employed by the construction companies, the farmers were able to sell all of its products, including meat, milk or timber and money "splashed the villages". Some 500 people from the area were in the end fully employed on the railroad.

The construction of the railway was to be finished in April 1924. However, due to the problems with the constructors, which had to be changed, the first train to Vardište passed through on 25 January 1925. Additional number of bridges, tunnels and supporting walls than originally planned had to be built. At the portal of the Vardište tunnel, which was to be a border one before the war, there is a sculpture of Serbian soldier crushing the crown of the Austria-Hungary with his foot. In total, there are 22 tunnels and five larger bridges on the route. The railroad left Užice at the elevation of 404 m (1,325 ft), peaking at the Šargan tunnel at 808 m (2,651 ft). The entire area is abundant in water, which gave name to the village Mokra Gora ("Wet Mountain"). There are 365 known water springs along the route. The water is literally dripping down the tunnel walls.

The railroad connected Belgrade to the Adriatic Sea, and the coastal towns of Dubrovnik and Zelenika. The former East Bosnian railway with a gauge of 760 mm (2 ft 5 15/16 in) was an important part of the former narrow-gauge main line from Sarajevo to Belgrade and closed on 28 February 1974. In the mid-1990s, the Homeland Society of Mokra Gora, founded a board to promote the reconstruction of the railway. They inspected the route and reported that some of the tunnels deteriorated a lot. Established in May 1994, the society organized public actions in 1997 and 1998, when the railway route was cleaned, including the tunnels. The state reconstructed one of the tunnels and then added the entire route to its reconstruction plans in August 1999. In one year, the demolished station buildings in Mokra Gora, Jatare, Šargan-Vitasi, and the auxiliary objects, were rebuilt. Missing tracks were laid and already in 1999 the first train passed through. Between 1999 and 2003 the section over the Šargan pass was rebuilt by the Serbian Ministry of Tourism and the Yugoslav state railway JŽ, now the Serbian railways (Železnice Srbije).

=== 21st century ===
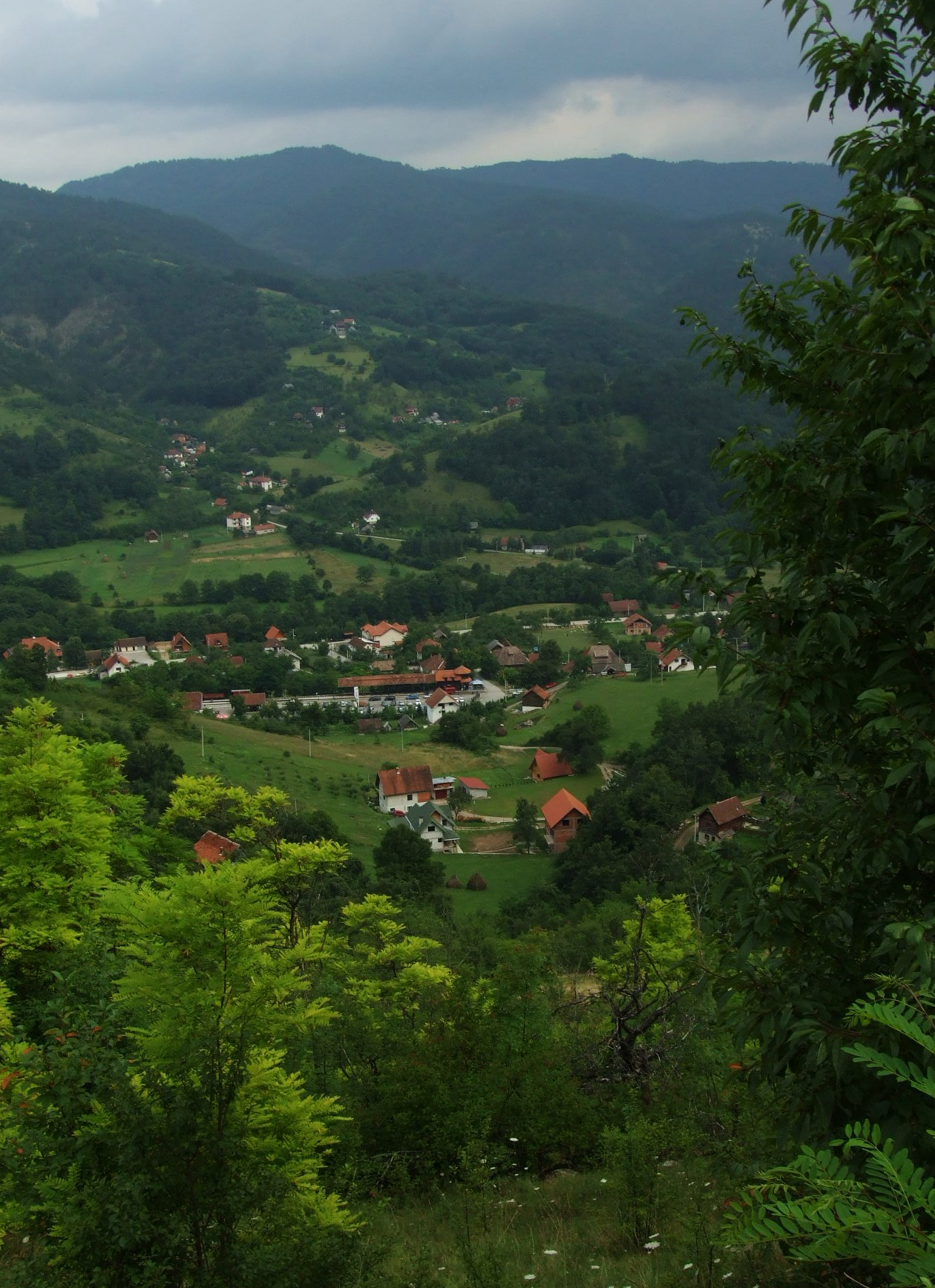
Village of Mokra Gora, with Šargan Eight's station in the central section of the photo

Touristic complex Mokra Gora was opened in 2000. After taking the route in the restored "Ćira" train in 2001, prime minister Zoran Điniđić said 'This is Switzerland'. First, trial ride on the entire route was conducted in October 2002 and the line became fully operational on 1 September 2003. The cars have been renovated and kept the authentic 1930s style. There are five stations, each with a scenic viewpoint. Emir Kusturica, a famous film director who had the town of Drvengrad (near the Šargan Eight station on Mokra Gora) built for one of his movies, is known for publicly promoting the route.

An extension to Višegrad was finished on 28 August 2010, and the line became operational in September 2011. The Mokra Gora-Višegrad branch is 25 kilometres (16 mi) long. It was planned to extend the railway to the village of Kremna by the end of 2011, and in 2013 to extend to the city of Užice. However, by 2021, though 4 kilometres (2.5 mi) of tracks were placed, the remaining 0.5 kilometres (0.31 mi) needed to reach Kremna were not finished.

As of 2017, the train popularly named "Ćira" but officially called "Nostalgia", still runs only on the route Mokra Gora-Šargan Vitasi-Mokra Gora, with occasionally running to Višegrad. During the snowy periods, it runs only from Mokra Gora to Jatare. In 2017 season it had 75,000 visitors, out of which 25,000 were foreign tourists. Attractions include the restaurant carved into the rock at Šargan and a rock named "crazy stone" (Serbian colloquialism for getting married) at Golubići, which "invokes love". In the 2019 season, number of visitors grew to 88,000.

By the 2020s, the area along the route of the Šargan Eight developed into the touristic complex. It includes Mokra Gora (with inns), Kusturica's ethno-village Drvengrad, ski resort Iver, excursion areas Jatare and Jatarice (with small river lake), Kamišina hiking path, Kamišina waterfalls, water spring Bele Vode (discovered in 1994 after the Kamišina flooding, declared a medicinal), resting areas and pathways made of old rails and car springs, etc. Along the Kamišina river there is even narrower, today out of use railway, which was used for the local timber transport. A small, wooden Orthodox church, was built in 2011, with blessing from both Serbian and Russian Orthodox Churches. Dedicated to the Seven Martyrs of Ephesus, it is a memorial chapel for all those who worked on the railroad's construction, including the killed prisoners of war. There is another church across the river, dedicated to the Saint John the Baptist. A bridge in front of the church was built in 2009.

By September 2022, the Jatare station was the only one of five where not one ticket was ever sold. The Golubići station was actually one of the sets for Kusturica's film Life Is a Miracle. The sets developed into Drvengrad after the filming was finished, and Golubići became a tourist attraction of its own. Jatare's scenic viewpoint is Devojačka Stena ("girl's boulder"), with view on Mokra Gora and Bele Vode, with its water spring. Attraction along the route also include the 14th century's Dobrun monastery.

In 2019 reconstruction of the tunnels began. Works should be finished by 2021, a centennial of the construction works on the railroad. Also in 2019, the connection to Višegrad was again discontinued, but was restored in late August 2022.

== Protection ==
The area surrounding the railway was placed under the preliminary protection by the government in 2005. In 2008. the area was officially protected as the "Šargan-Mokra Gora" nature park. It covers an area of 108.13 km^{2} (41.75 sq mi) and includes the whole of the Mokra Gora basin, part of the Kremna basin, southeast slopes of the Tara, northwest slopes of the Zlatibor, and the Šargan pass, which divides these two mountains. The preservation of Šargan Eight was specifically named as one of the reasons for protection in government's decree.

== Gallery ==
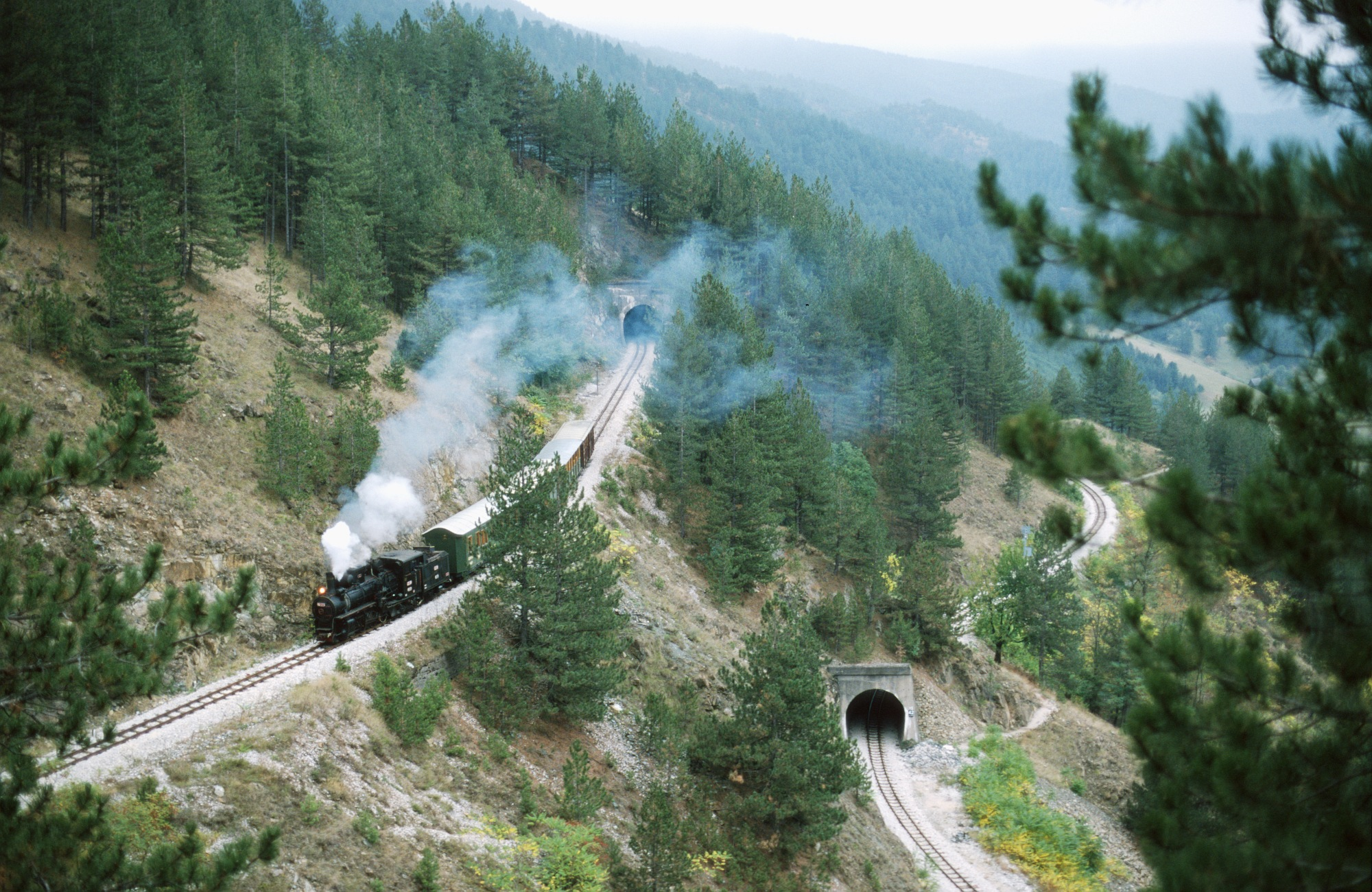
Train hauled by a Class 83

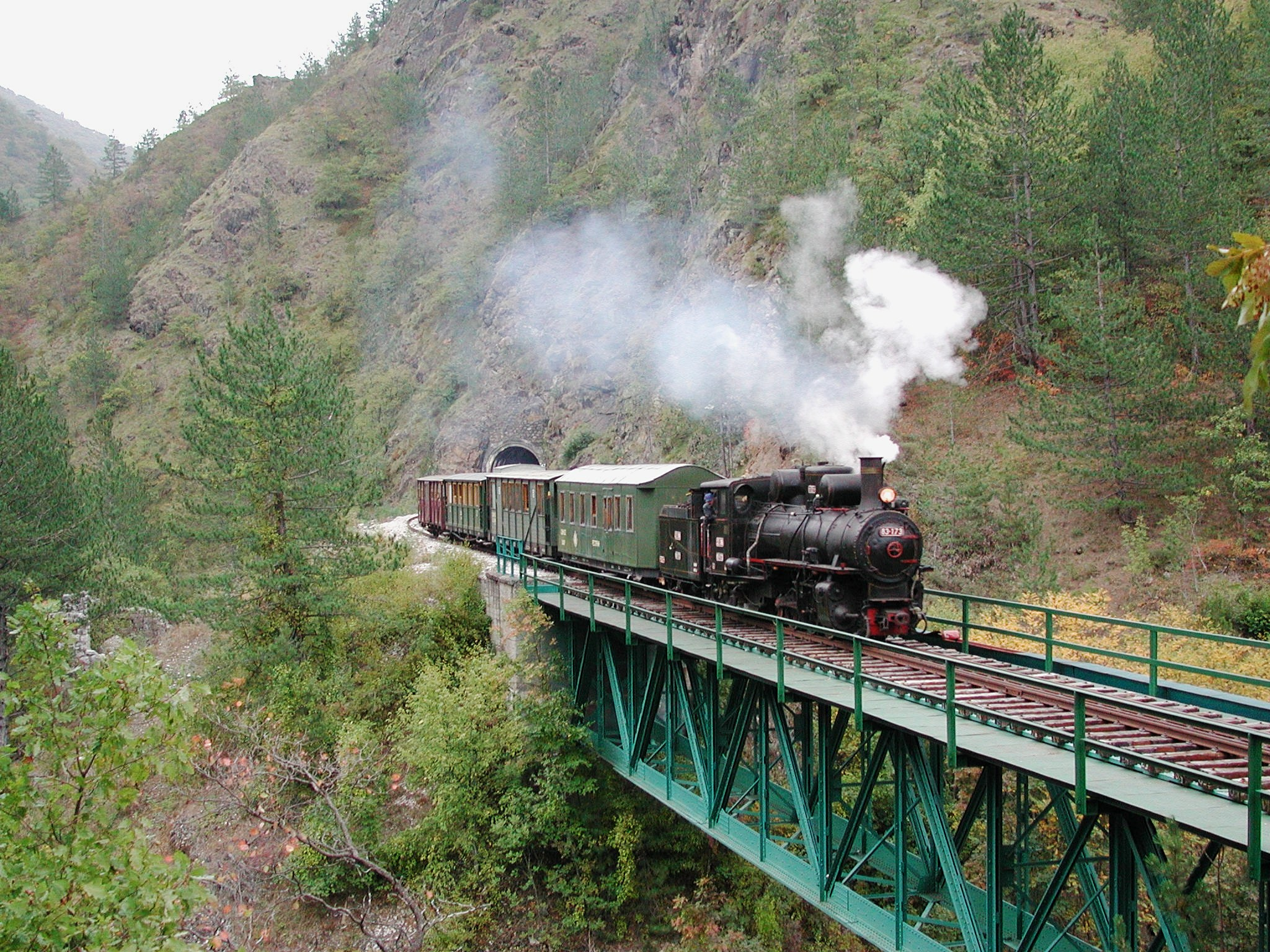
Train crossing the longest bridge on the line

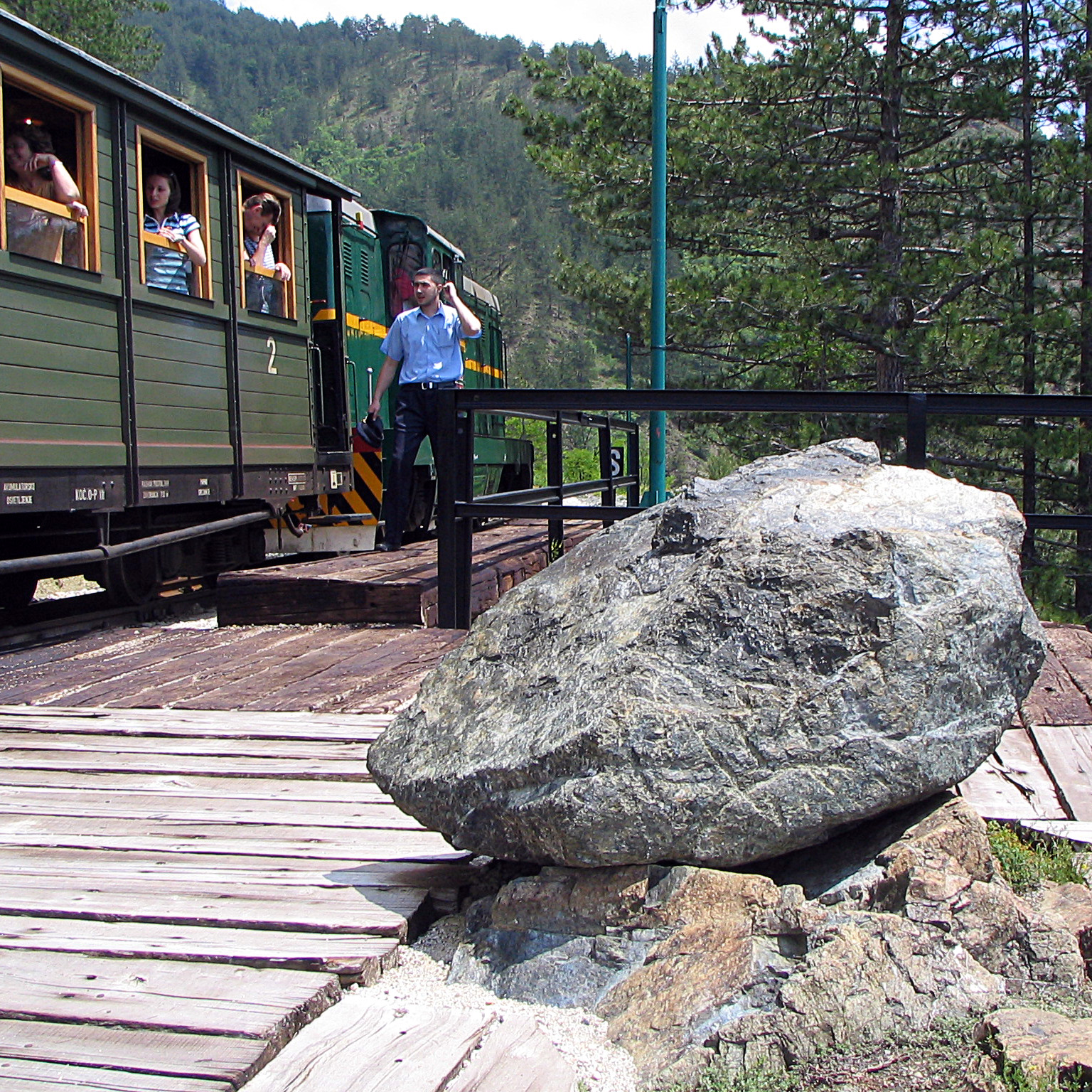
The Crazy Stone

== See also ==
- Narrow-gauge railways in Bosnia and Herzegovina
- Narrow-gauge railways in Serbia
- Tourism in Serbia
