= Hum, Trebinje =

Hum Хум
- Village
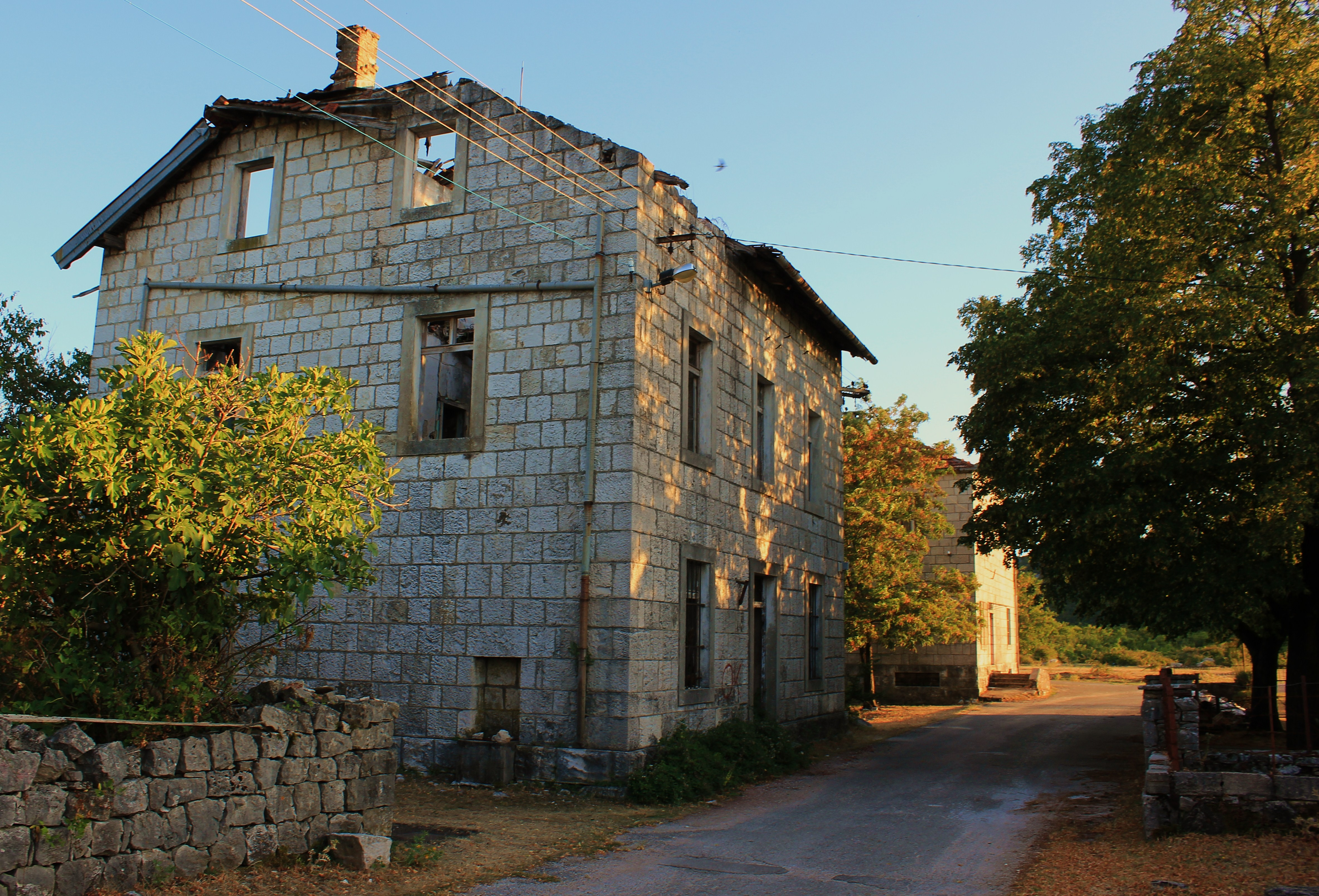

- Location within Bosnia and Herzegovina
- Coordinates: 42°43′45″N 18°11′39″E
- Country: Bosnia and Herzegovina
- Entity: Republika Srpska
- Municipality: Trebinje
- Time zone: UTC+1 (CET)
  - Summer (DST): UTC+2 (CEST)

Hum (Serbian Cyrillic: Хум) is a village in the municipality of Trebinje, Republika Srpska, Bosnia and Herzegovina. Between 1901 and 1976, it used to be an important junction on the Gabela - Zelenika narrow gauge railway.
