= Semizovac =

- Village
- Location within Bosnia and Herzegovina
- Coordinates: 43°55′N 18°19′E
- Country: Bosnia and Herzegovina
- Entity: Federation of Bosnia and Herzegovina
- Canton: Sarajevo
- Municipality: Vogošća

Area
  - Total: 0.66 sq mi (1.72 km^{2})

Population (2013)
  - Total: 790
  - Density: 1,200/sq mi (460/km^{2})
- Time zone: UTC+1 (CET)
  - Summer (DST): UTC+2 (CEST)

Semizovac is a village in Vogošća municipality, near Sarajevo, Federation of Bosnia and Herzegovina, Bosnia and Herzegovina.

== Demographics ==
According to the 2013 census, its population was 790.

Ethnicity in 2013
Ethnicity	Number	Percentage
Bosniaks	688	87.1%
Serbs	19	2.4%
Croats	21	2.7%
other/undeclared	62	7.8%
Total	790	100%
