= Podmolje =

Podmolje Подмоље
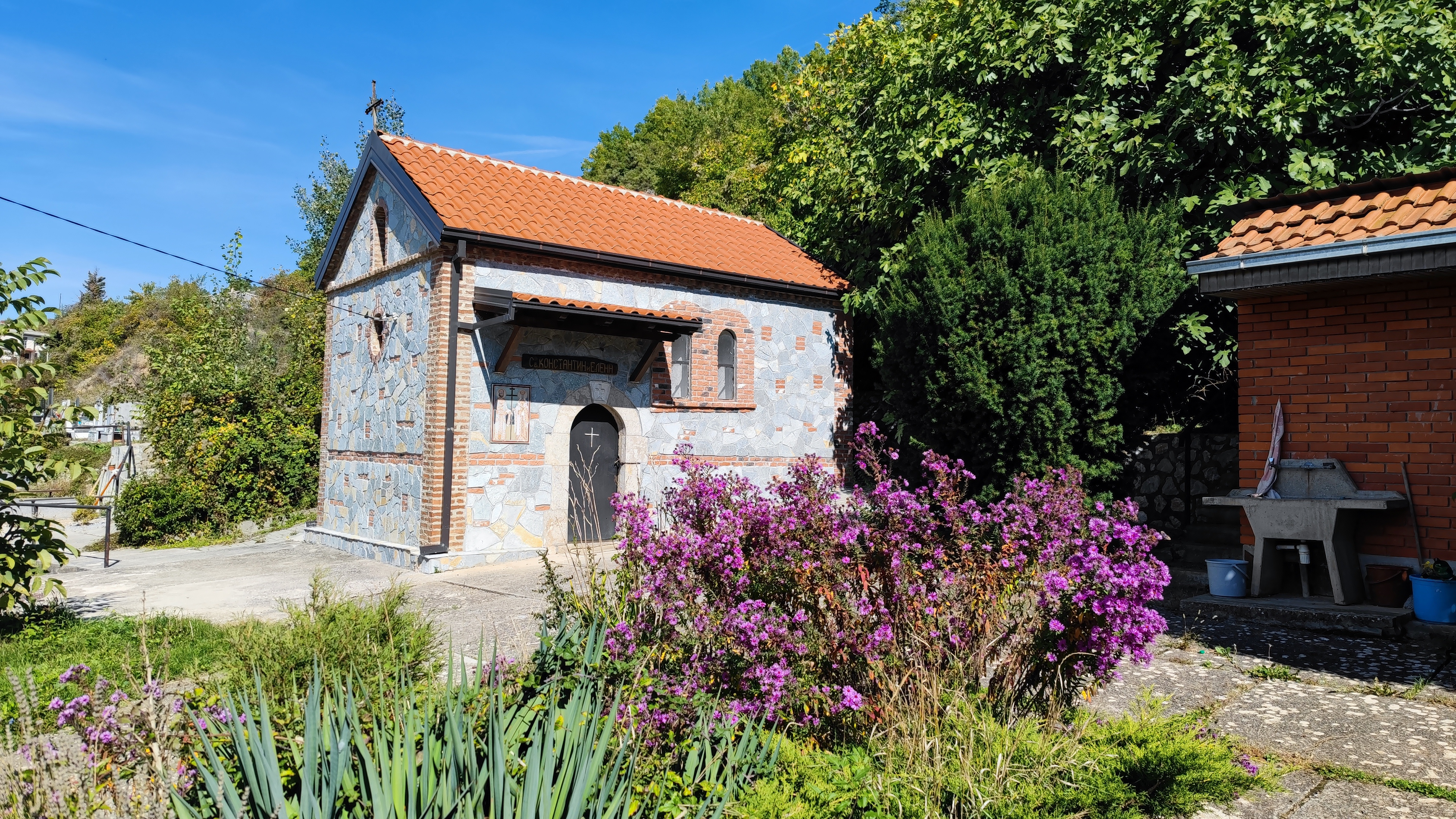
- Sts. Constantine and Helena Church

- Location within North Macedonia
- Coordinates: 41°9′40″N 20°45′8″E
- Country: North Macedonia
- Municipality: Ohrid Municipality

Population (2002)
  - Total: 331

Podmolje (Macedonian: Подмоље) is a village in the municipality of Ohrid, in the southwestern part of North Macedonia.

== Demographics ==
According to the national census of 2002, the village had a total of 331 inhabitants. Ethnic groups in the municipality include:

- Macedonians: 325
- Serbs: 2
- Other: 4
