= Podlugovi =

Podlugovi Подлугови
- Village
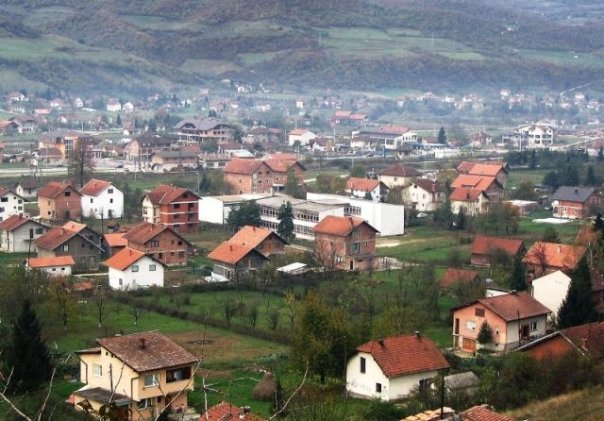

- Location within Bosnia and Herzegovina
- Coordinates: 43°58′N 18°16′E
- Country: Bosnia and Herzegovina
- Entity: Federation of Bosnia and Herzegovina
- Canton: Sarajevo
- Municipality: Ilijaš

Area
  - Total: 0.53 sq mi (1.37 km^{2})

Population (2013)
  - Total: 1,228
  - Density: 2,320/sq mi (896/km^{2})
- Time zone: UTC+1 (CET)
  - Summer (DST): UTC+2 (CEST)

Podlugovi (Serbian Cyrillic: Подлугови) is a village in the municipality of Ilijaš, Bosnia and Herzegovina.

The village is known in former Yugoslavia thanks to Zdravko Čolić's song Stanica Podlugovi from 1983.

== Demographics ==
According to the 2013 census, its population was 1,228.

Ethnicity in 2013
Ethnicity	Number	Percentage
Bosniaks	1,105	90.0%
Serbs	37	3.0%
Croats	23	1.9%
other/undeclared	63	5.1%
Total	1,228	100%
