= Uskoplje, Ravno =

Uskoplje
- Village
- Location within Bosnia and Herzegovina
- Coordinates: 42.6731908°N 18.1570546°E
- Country: Bosnia and Herzegovina
- Entity: Federation of Bosnia and Herzegovina
- Canton: Herzegovina-Neretva
- Municipality: Ravno

Area
  - Total: 3.00 sq mi (7.78 km^{2})

Population (2013)
  - Total: 169
  - Density: 56.3/sq mi (21.7/km^{2})
- Time zone: UTC+1 (CET)
  - Summer (DST): UTC+2 (CEST)

Uskoplje is a village in the municipality of Ravno, Bosnia and Herzegovina.

== Demographics ==
According to the 2013 census, its population was 169.

Ethnicity in 2013
Ethnicity	Number	Percentage
Croats	88	52.1%
Serbs	74	43.8%
Bosniaks	7	4.1%
Total	169	100%
