= Vitasi =

- Village
- Location within Serbia
- Coordinates: 43°50′N 19°33′E
- Country: Serbia

Population (2011)
  - Total: 179
- Time zone: UTC+1 (CET)
  - Summer (DST): UTC+2 (CEST)

Vitasi (Serbian Cyrillic: Витаси) is a village located in the Užice municipality of Serbia. In the 2011 census, the village had a population of 179.
