= Ivan planina =

Ivan
- Location within Bosnia and Herzegovina

Highest point
- Elevation: 1,534 m (5,033 ft)
- Coordinates: 43°47′31″N 18°00′33″E

Geography
- Location: Bosnia and Herzegovina
- Parent range: Dinaric Alps

Ivan planina (Serbian Cyrillic: Иван планина; lit. Ivan Mountain) is a mountain near Hadžići, Konjic and Kreševo, in central Bosnia and Herzegovina. Ivan Mountain is part of the Dinaric Alps. It is 1,534 metres (5,033 ft) tall. It is a major pass between Bosnia and Herzegovina, which is known under the name Ivan Sedlo.

== See also ==
- List of mountains in Bosnia and Herzegovina
