= Mostar railway station =

Railway station in Mostar, Bosnia and Herzegovina

Mostar
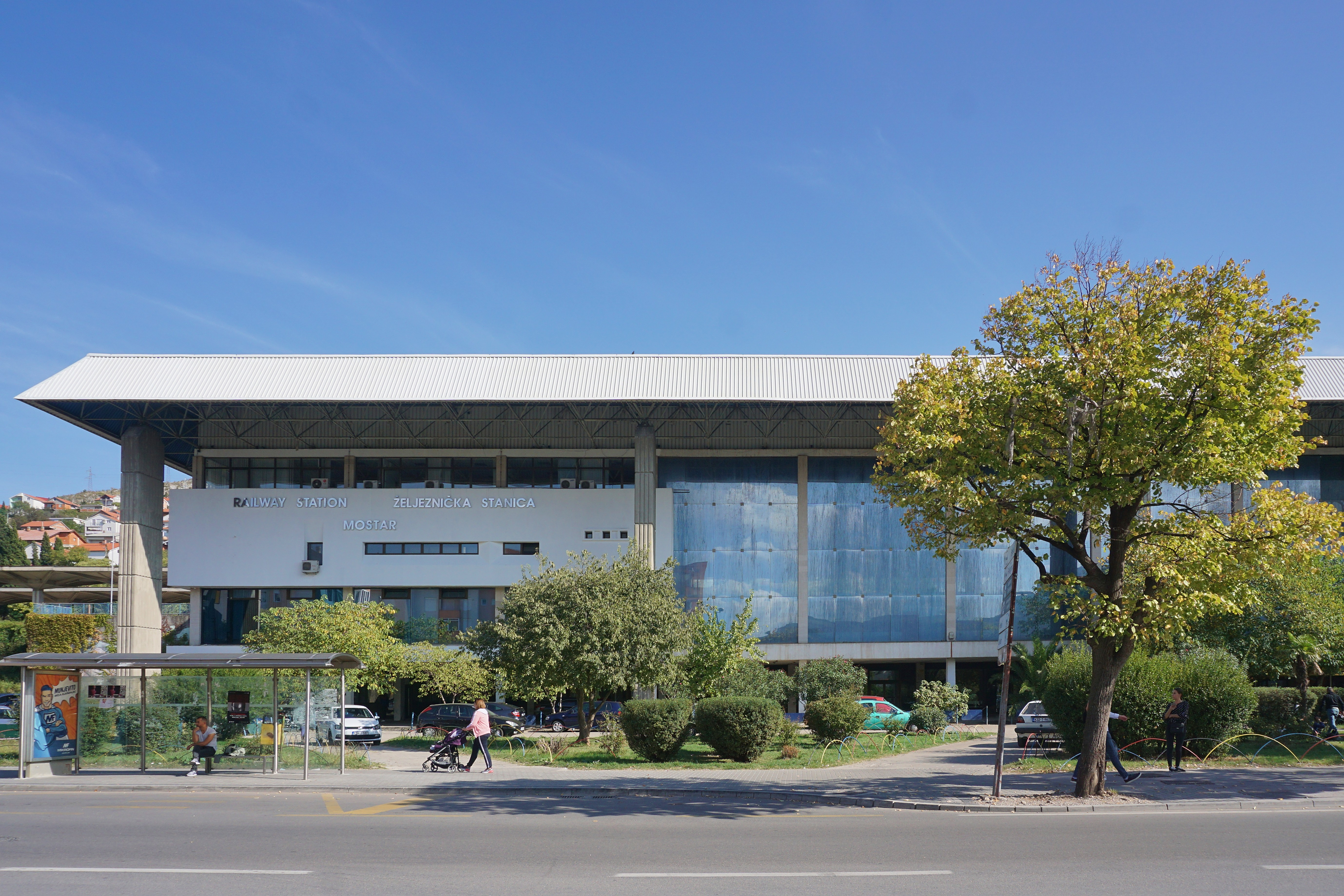
- Mostar railway station, 2019

General information
- Location: Trg Ivana Krndelja 1, Mostar; Herzegovina-Neretva Canton; Bosnia and Herzegovina
- Coordinates: 43°20′55″N 17°48′50″E
- Owner: ŽFBH
- Line: Sarajevo–Ploče railway
- Platforms: 3
- Tracks: 6
- Train operators: ŽFBH

Construction
- Structure type: Elevated
- Platform levels: 1
- Parking: Yes
- Cycle facilities: Yes

Other information
- Status: Staffed
- Website: http://www.zfbh.ba

History
- Opened: 30 June 1885; 141 years ago
- Rebuilt: 27 November 1966; 59 years ago
- Electrified: 25 kV AC, 50 Hz
Location
- Location within Bosnia and Herzegovina

Mostar railway station (Bosnian: Željeznička stanica Mostar) is a railway station located in Mostar, Bosnia and Herzegovina, in the eastern part of the city, near the Carinski Bridge, on Maršala Tita Street. The terminal also includes a bus station.

== History ==
The station opened on 14 June 1885, when the first section of the Southern Railway was completed with some rail traffic had already commenced on 26 January 1885. Built with authorization of the Austro-Hungarian Monarchy to better to establish communication from the interior to the sea, the line runs through the valley of the Neretva River. The line was built to Bosnian gauge of 760mm.

The opening of the station was a huge social event for the city, which was gradually modernizing after centuries of Turkish rule. The old railway station, built entirely in the spirit of Austro-Hungarian architecture, was known primarily for the fact that there was an entrance to the waiting room from the street side and then an entrance to the platform from the other side. In 1963 the line was realigned and rebuilt to Standard gauge; as a result, a number of stations along the line were upgraded, including Mostar. The new station was relocated from its original location, the original station was demolished, with a new street in the city built on the track alignment. The new modern, spacious terminal with two platforms was built in Brutalist style. The new line was officially opened on 26 and 27 November 1966. The line was electrified by 1969, becoming Yugoslavia's first AC-electrified rail line.

By early 1992, the Ploče-Sarajevo railway bosted APB, remote control of traction, and remote control of traffic to ensure a high level of safety in rail traffic and new rollingstock, making it one of the most modern railways in Europe. However, in 1992, in connection with the war in Bosnia and Herzegovina, Railway facilities and infrastructure were damaged or destroyed, with the original railway archive located in the station area burned. The total damage is estimated at $1 billion US dollars. The line was closed from 2015 to 2017 for repairs and upgrades. Today the station still operates, but is slightly rundown and with only a few long-distance services.

In early February 2020, the station was hit by storm force winds that damaged parts of the roof of the main building. In March, the still damaged building was flooded, with passengers forced to access the platforms through the adjacent building.

In March 2024, Five freight wagons derailed and overturned during the night near the settlement of Opine (near Mostar), the train was traveling from Čapljina to Mostar railway station, There were no report injuries. However all rail traffic on the line was suspended as a result of the accident. In May 2024 the Sarajevo-Mostar Intercity service derailed outside of Konjic, with passengers needing to take a bus to complete their journey. The derailment was later attributed to poor maintenance of the track bed.

== Services ==
=== Trains ===
Since 2010 passenger service uses Talgo trains. The Sarajevo–Ploče line was closed from 2015 to 2017 for repairs and upgrades. Passenger service did not extend into Croatia; the final distance from Čapljina at the border to Ploče, where a rail replacement bus service was in operation. Nonetheless, during the summer of 2022, the Talgo service from Sarajevo was extended to the Croatian coastal town of Ploče during the weekends. Starting from 1 July 2022. until 11 September 2022 the train runs three times a week, on Fridays, Saturdays and Sundays.

- Čapljina – Mostar – Konjic – Sarajevo (two per day and direction)

The trains are operated by Railways of the Federation of Bosnia and Herzegovina (ŽFBH).

=== Buses ===
Mostar bus station is outside the railway station with coaches to many destinations in BiH and surrounding countries.

City buses also serve the station.

== Station layout ==
L Ground/Concourse	Customer service	Tickets/Exits
Level; Ε1	Side platform, doors will open on the right
Level; Ε1	Platform 1	Intercity towards Ploče ←
Level; Ε1	Platform 2	Intercity towards Sarajevo →
Level; Ε1	Island platform, doors on the right/left
Level; Ε1	Platform 3	In non-regular use

== Gallery ==
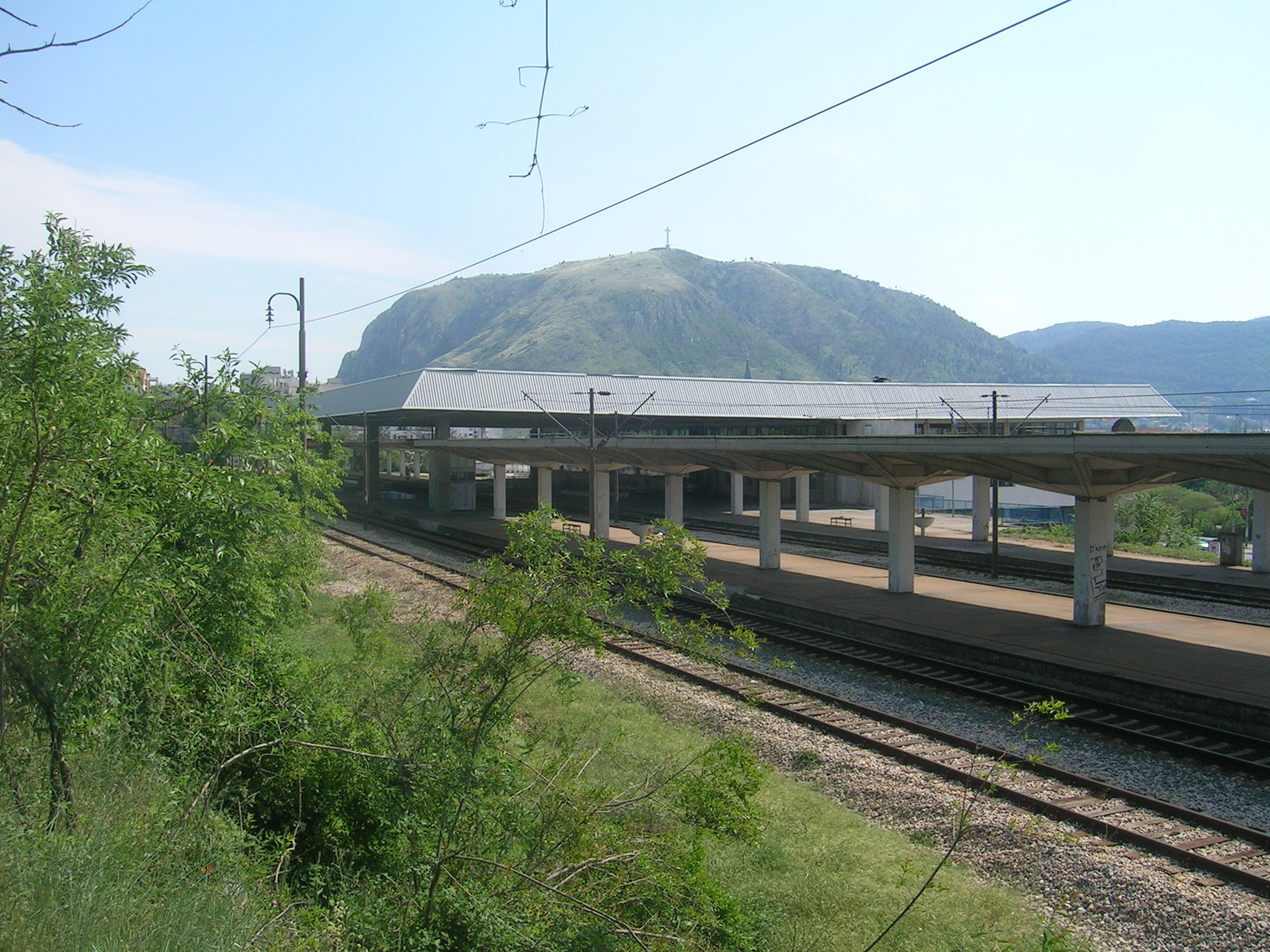
Platforms of Mostar railway station, in the background Hum mountain, May 2012

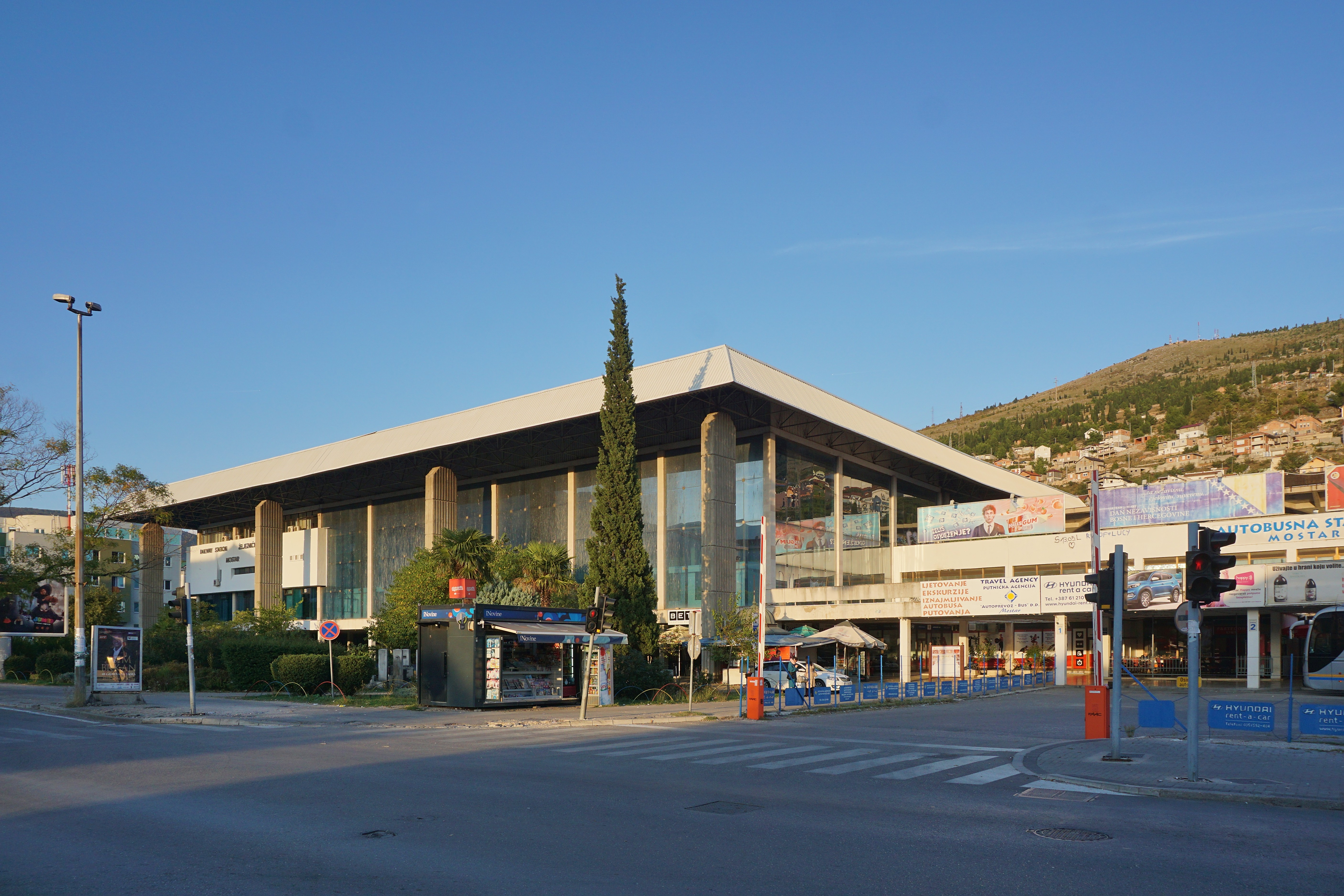
The station forecourt, October 2019
