= Sarajevo–Ploče railway =

Railway line in Bosnia and Herzegovina and Croatia

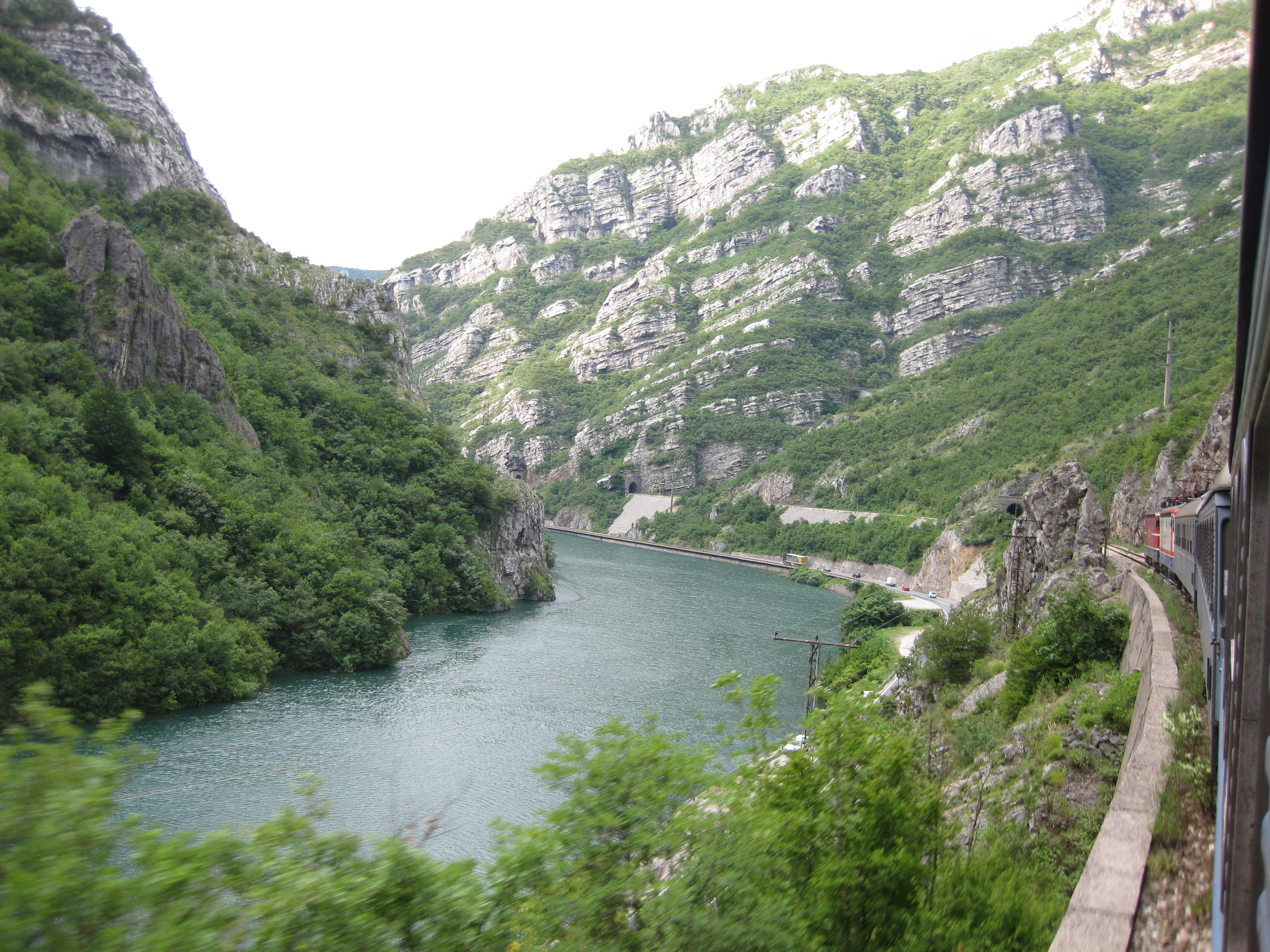

Overview
- Native name: Željeznička pruga Sarajevo–Ploče
- Status: in use
- Owner: ŽFBH; HŽ
- Locale: Bosnia and Herzegovina, Croatia
- Termini: Sarajevo (43°51′37″N 18°23′57″E); Ploče
- Stations: 27

Service
- Type: Heavy rail
- Services: 3
- Operator(s): ŽFBH; HŽ
- Rolling stock: Talgo wagons ŽFBH 441 locomotives

History
- Opened: 27 November 1966; 59 years ago (standard gauge)

Technical
- Line length: 194 km (121 mi)
- Number of tracks: Single track
- Track gauge: 1,435 mm (4 ft 8 1/2 in) standard gauge
- Old gauge: 760 mm (2 ft 5 15/16 in) Bosnian gauge
- Electrification: 25 kV 50 Hz
- Operating speed: 70 km/h (45 mph) in B&H; 110 km/h (70 mph) in Croatia

former Sarajevo–Ploče narrow gauge railway

Overview
- Status: out of use

History
- Opened: 1 August 1891; 134 years ago
- Closed: 5 November 1966; 59 years ago

Technical
- Line length: 191.7 km (119.1 mi)
- Number of tracks: Single track
- Rack system: Abt
- Track gauge: 760 mm (2 ft 5 15/16 in) Bosnian gauge
- Minimum radius: 80 metres (260 ft)
- Operating speed: 40 km/h (25 mph) (railcars: 60 km/h)

The Sarajevo–Ploče railway is a 194-kilometre (121-mile) long railway in Bosnia and Herzegovina and Croatia. The line connects Sarajevo with Konjic, Mostar and Ploče. The route operates through the regions of Sarajevo Canton, Herzegovina-Neretva Canton and Dubrovnik-Neretva County. The route largely follows the route of the Neretva river. Passenger services along the full length of line have been discontinued between 2013 and 2022, running only between Sarajevo and the town of Čapljina on the Bosnian-Croatian border. International train service between Sarajevo and Ploče resumed on 1 July 2022, on weekends until 1 September 2022, using Spanish-designed Talgo wagons. This service also ran during the summer of 2023. The line is part of the pan-European corridor 5C from Budapest via Osijek and Sarajevo to Ploče. The section through Bosnia and Herzegovina is marked 11, and through Croatia M304.

== Route ==
Longitudinal profile of the track

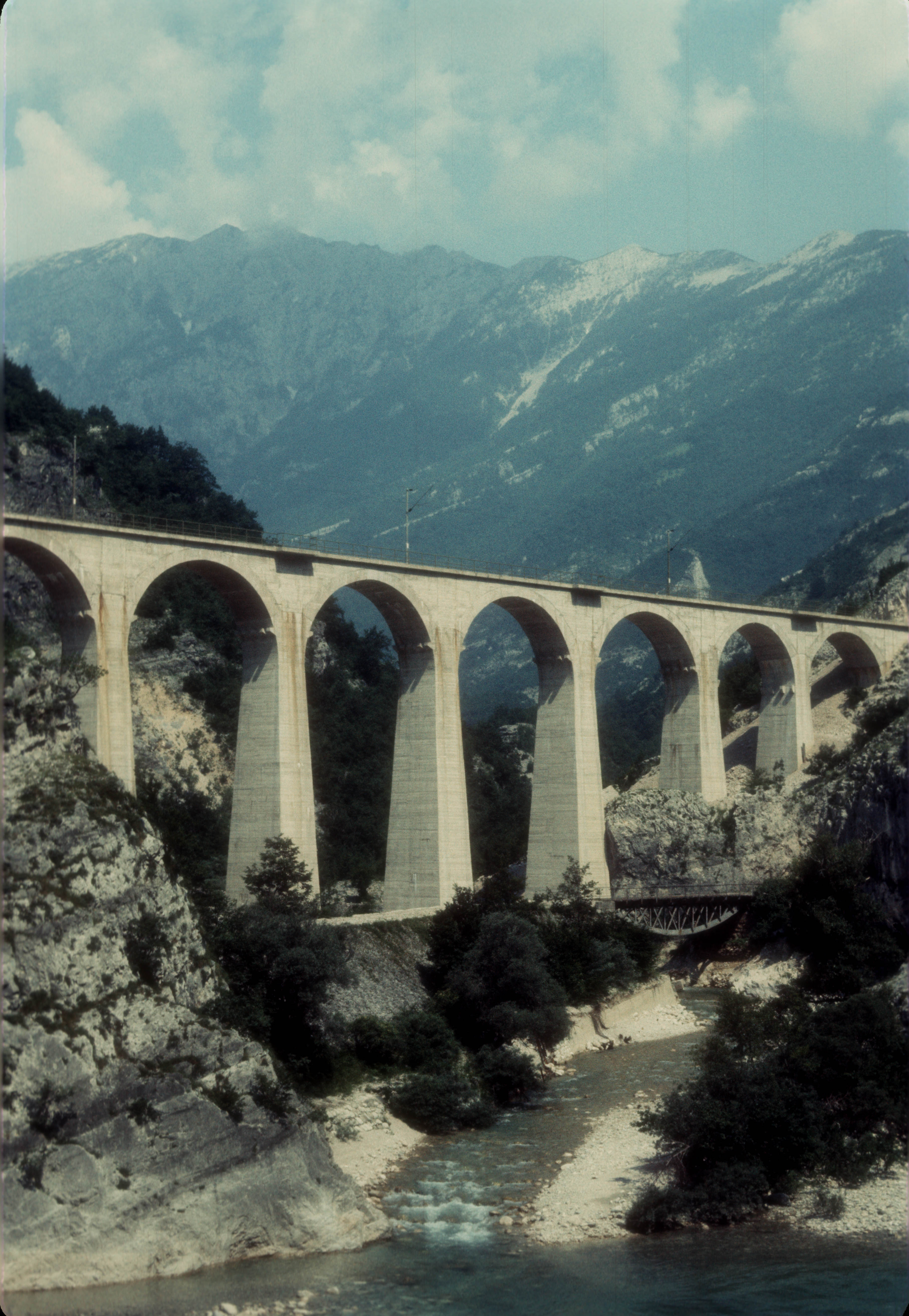
The railway bridge at the confluence of the Grabovica and Neretva river, under which the old narrow-gauge railway bridge is visible

The railway starts at Sarajevo station, goes through the Sarajevo field, and has the characteristics of a plain railway. The valley of the river Zujevina acquires the characteristics of a slope and descends through the Ivan Mountain to the Bradina high-slope railway. The descent of the railway continues on the left side of the Trešanica river to Podorašac, where it crosses to the right side of the Trešanica river to Konjic. The route continues across the Jablanica lake, and after Ostrošac, it descends towards the Neretva with features of a slope railway. Before Jablanica, it crosses to the right side of the Neretva. The railway continues through the Neretva canyon between the Prenj and Čvrsnica mountains, and after Raštan, it again crosses to the left side of the Neretva and enters Mostar. Leaving Mostar, the line heads south, again crosses to the right side of the Neretva to Ploče with the features of the low valley railway before ending on the coast of the Adractic sea.

== Railway features ==
Technical data about the current standard gauge railway:

- Length: 194.6 km
- Track: 1
- Stations: 27
- Bridges: 71 with a total length of 3.7 km (2.3 mi)
- Tunnels: 106 with a total length of 36.6 km (22.7 mi) (the longest Ivan sedlo, 3.23 km (2.01 mi))
- Of the above, 46 tunnels and 21 bridges are on the section between Bradina and Konjic
- Track length in stations:130.7 km (81.2 mi) (of which 23.7 km (14.7 mi) in Sarajevo)
- Minimum radius on the most difficult sections: 250 m (between Grad and Konjic stations)
- Minimum radius on other sections: 400 m (1,300 ft)
- Track development coefficient: 1.63
- Expected speeds (according to the project): 65 km/h (40 mph) (minimum) 110 km/h (68 mph) (maximum)
- Axle pressure: 20 t
- Electrical voltage networks: 25 kV, 50 Hz.

== Stations ==
- Sarajevo
- Konjic
- Čelebić
- Ostrožac
- Mostar
- Ploče

== History ==
=== The planning and building ===
After the Berlin Congress in 1878, Bosnia and Herzegovina came under the military administration of Austria-Hungary. This change in circumstances allowed the construction of a railway network in the newly acquired areas to be accelerated, reversing the previous policy of isolating Dalmatian ports from inland access. Military and strategic interests had priority in determining future routes over economic interests. Over the next several decades, a network of narrow-gauge railways throughout Bosnia and Herzegovina were built, with a gauge width of 760 mm, often called the Bosnian gauge. In the period from 1879 to 1891, several railways were connected on the route Bosanski Brod-Zenica-Sarajevo-Mostar-Metković. After the construction of the railway Bosanski Brod-Sarajevo, the plan was to build the railway from Sarajevo-Banja Luka via Travnik and Jajce, and further towards Aržano and Split (Sinjska rera), as well as the Una railway. The Hungarians opposed that plan, believing that the Austrian part of the Monarchy would benefit more from that railway. At that time, the plan for the construction of the Sarajevo-Metković railway was adopted, although it was not the best solution in the long run due to the shallow and muddy Neretva and the impossibility of docking larger vessels in the port of Metković.

The first measurements began in 1879, and in the summer of 1884, the construction of the first section from Metković to Mostar began, for which all the material was brought via the port in Metković. The most difficult part of this section was from Buna to Čapljina, a length of 19 kilometres (12 miles), because it passed through the Neretva canyon, which was difficult to access, so an auxiliary road was also built for construction purposes. From Gabela to Metković, due to the flooding of the Neretva, the railway was built on an embankment. In this section, the width of the upper embankment was 3 metres (9.8 ft). The rails weighed 17.8 kg per meter in length and the tunnels were built with a width of 3.3 metres (11 ft) and a height of 3.1 metres (10 ft). The capacity of the section was 30 trains in 24 hours, and the maximum speed was up to 18 km/h. Although this speed corresponded to a minimum radius of 71 metres (233 ft), the built minimum radius was 100 metres (330 ft).

=== The line opens ===
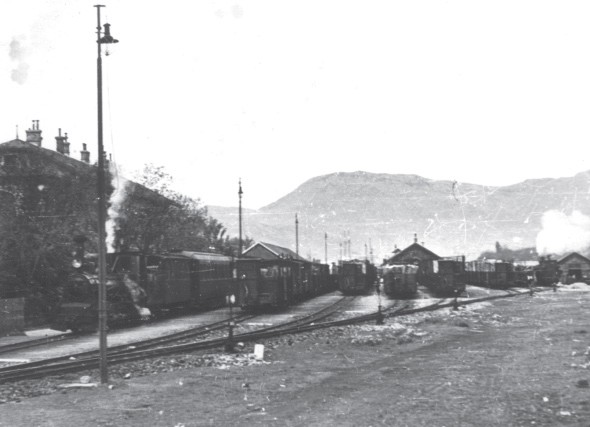
Metković railway station during narrow gauge era

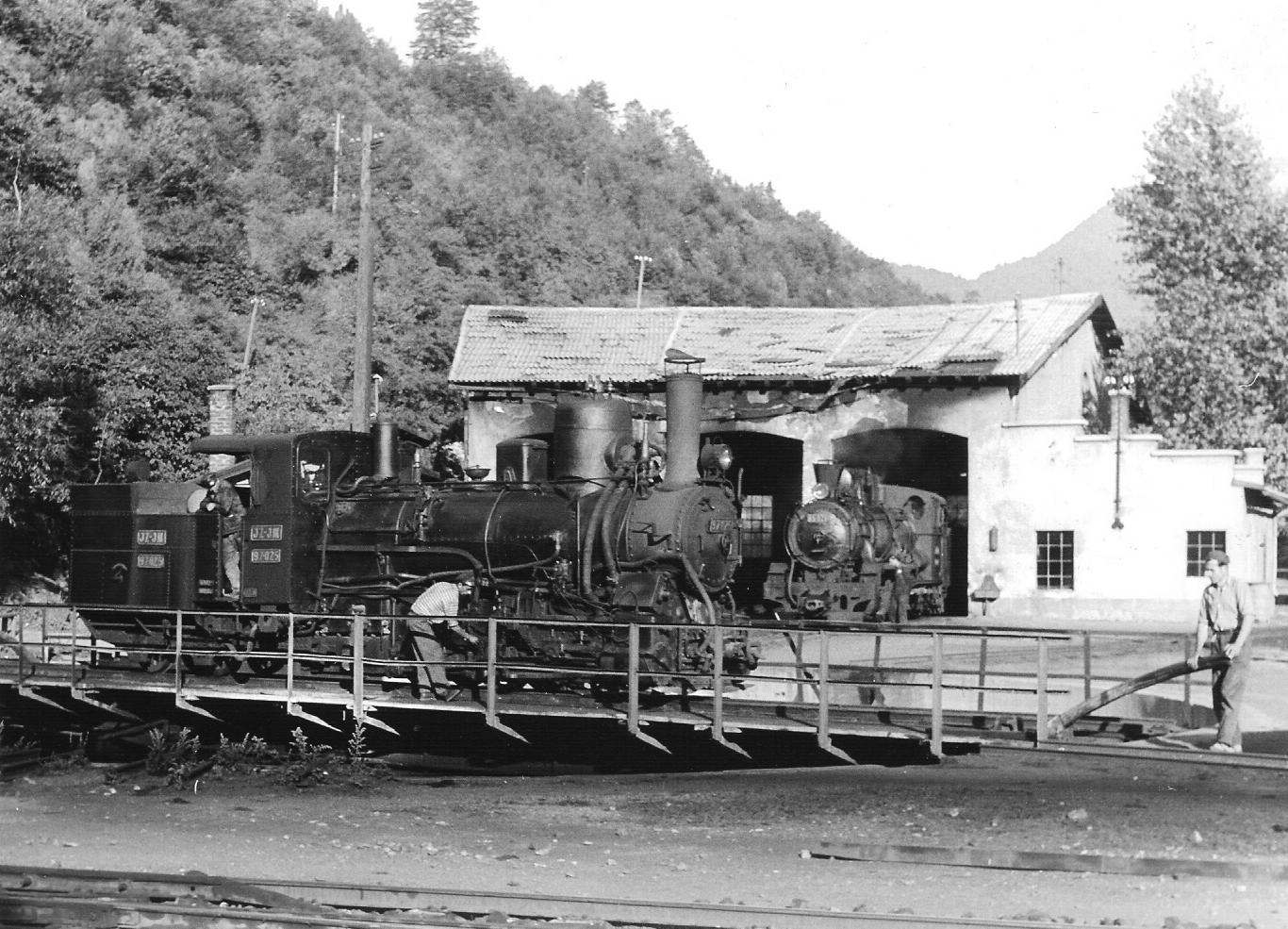
A 97 series locomotive on the turnpike at Bradina in 1965

The line was opened in 1891 in the Bosnian gauge of 760mm. With the construction of the railway, the port of Metković grew into one of the most important ports in Dalmatia, and the first port in Dalmatia to receive a railway line. The section from Mostar to Konjic was built through the canyon of the Neretva river, and in some places, it had features of a mountain railway. A lot of walls, tunnels and cuttings were built, and because of the frequent crossing from one side of the river to the other, there were also a lot of bridges, so that section was much more expensive than the section built before. From Konjic to Sarajevo, the builders had to overcome the ascent of Ivan Mountain with a relative height of 600 metres (2,000 ft). For this purpose, a third rail (the so-called cogwheel of engineer Roman Abt) was laid on two sections: Pazarić - Tarčin (3.722 km, incline 35 per thousand) and Podorašac - Raštelica (15.222 km, gradient 60 per thousand). With the construction of the railway, the port in Metković has grown into one of the most important ports in Dalmatia, and the first port in Dalmatia to receive a railway. A 648 m tunnel was also cut through the Ivan mountains. Special steam locomotives of the 97 series pulled the trains on these two sections.

The total length of the railway from Metković to Sarajevo was 177.64 km (110.38 mi), and the construction costs were 19,900,000 Dinars, and built in a total of four stages, namely:

- Metković - Mostar, 43.678 km, put into traffic on 14 May 1885.
- Mostar - Ostrožac, 65.315 km, put into traffic on 22 August 1888.
- Ostrožac – Konjic, 13.030 km, put into traffic on 10 November 1889.
- Konjic - Sarajevo, 55.432 km, put into traffic on 1 August 1891.

In addition to the port in Metković, with the subsequent construction and commissioning of the Gabela - Zelenika railway line, Bosnia was also connected to the port in Gruž near Dubrovnik.

With the subsequent change of the route from Raštelica to Pazarić (complete abolition of the cogwheel on that section) and the construction of a new tunnel through Ivan planina with a length of 3,223 m between the two world wars, the cogwheel was partially abolished on 9 April 1931. Trains used additional locomotives in the so-called pushing or harnessing. Despite the subsequent works, the section was the bottleneck of the entire railway and limited the capacity to 1,000,000 net tons per year, and like most railways built at the time in BiH, this entire railway was built well below the standards for railways of this type.

=== Continuation to Ploče ===
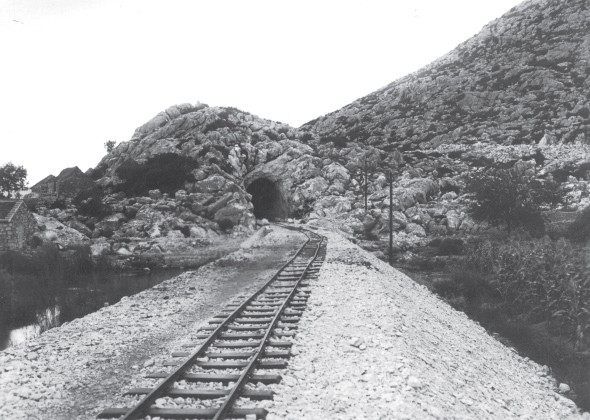
Tunnel drilling on the Metković-Ploče railway line, c. 1941.

Although there was an idea of extending the railway to the mouth of the Neretva, it became relevant in the 1920s as part of the project to connect Belgrade via Sarajevo with a new port on the sea, considering that the port in Metković could not meet growing needs. There were suggestions that the port should be in Klek or Neum, and the ports in Split and Dubrovnik were also against the new port. At the initiative of the Sarajevo Chamber of Commerce and Crafts, in late 1922 and early 1923, the Association of Engineers and Architects carried out the first measurements and surveys of the terrain at the site of the future port in Ploče. Subsequently, at the railway conference held in 1926, it was decided that the future port would be in Ploče. However, construction was constantly delayed due to conflicting interests regarding the future port. The technical study was completed only in 1936, with the port project in Ploče accepted 1938, and work began on the entire route to Ploče. The entire section had five stations, four bridges and five tunnels. By the end of 1940, almost 80% earthworks on the embankments, five tunnels, twenty-seven buildings, and other structures were complete. With the German and Italian attack on Yugoslavia, all works were suspended. In 1942, Italy completed the construction of the railway, and after Italy's capitulation, Germany rebuilt the partially damaged railway. At the end of the Second World War, the railway damaged by the withdrawal of German forces was being rebuilt again, and on 15 July 1945, the entire length from the port in Ploče to Sarajevo was put into traffic.

=== Postwar modernization ===
The price and costings of railway construction by sections (according to the project)

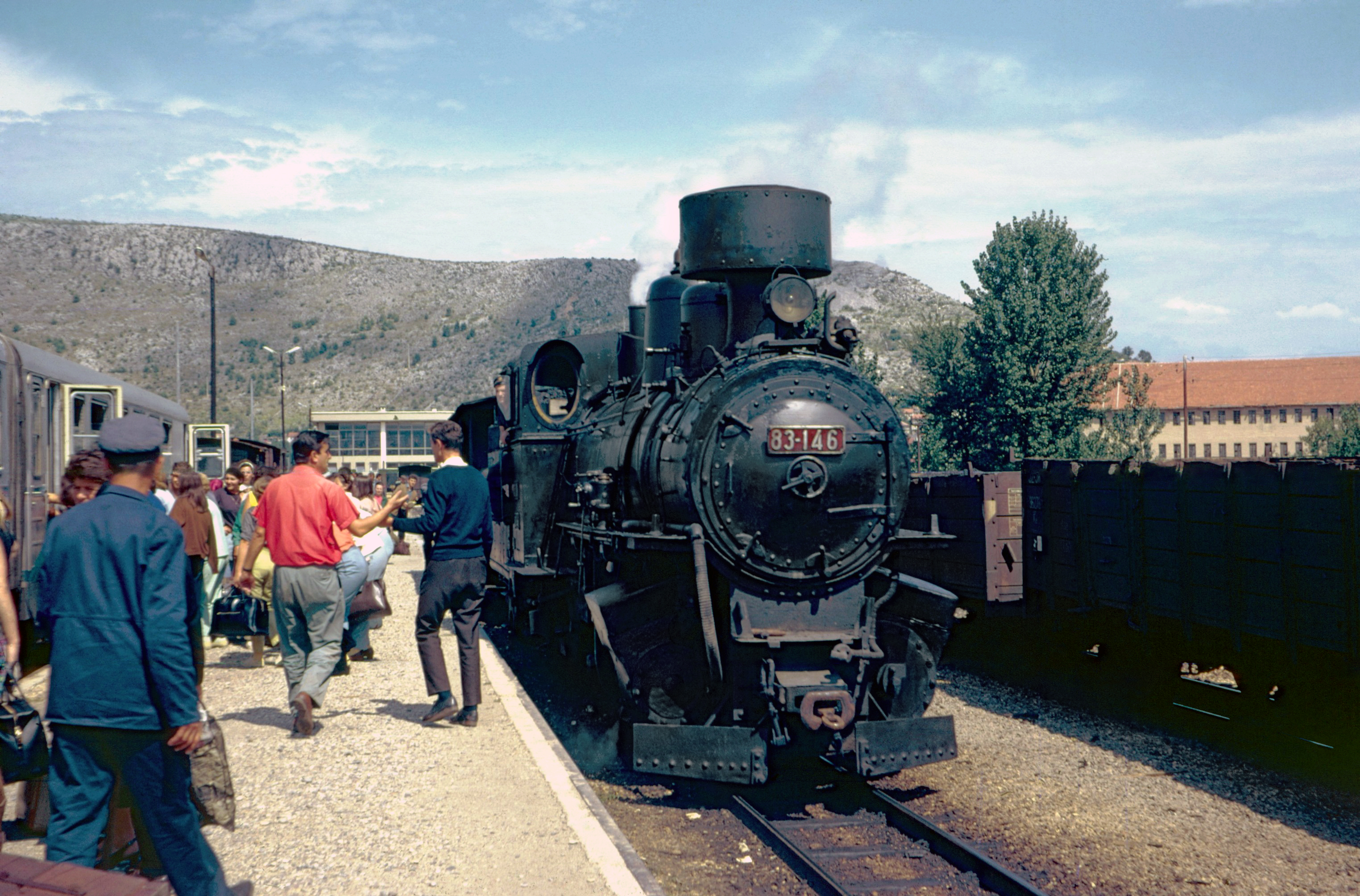
Locomotive series 83 at Čapljina 1968. (narrow gauge line towards Dubrovnik)

One of the necessary conditions for the industrialization of the Socialist Federal Republic of Yugoslavia (SFRY) after the Second World War was the reconstruction of 80% of the railway network destroyed or disabled in the war, the modernization and transition to a standard gauge (1435 mm), in order to increase rail capacity. In Bosnia and Herzegovina, new or modernized existing railways were built: Brčko - Banovići, Vrpolje - Šamac - Sarajevo, Doboj - Banja Luka and others. It was also necessary to modernize the Sarajevo–Ploče railway, considering that the port in Ploče was the most favourable outlet for BiH industry to the Adriatic Sea. The biggest problem was solving the most difficult section of the railway over Ivan Mountain. Research works and studies lasted from 1948 to 1958, during which time 13 possible solutions were analyzed. The adopted solution provided for the maximum use of the existing tunnel through Ivan mountain and the settlements and industries along the existing narrow-gauge railway. The five-year plan established that the railway should be built by the end of 1962.

Work on the railway began in 1958, but due to a lack of financial resources, the intensity was limited on the Bradina - Konjic section. Work only intensified in 1961, and the entire length of the line was completed in 1964.

Construction took place in three stages:

- building construction capacities and a smaller number of tracks
- electrification and construction of electrical relay security of stations
- remote traffic control, automatic track block, and completion of tracks in stations.

The last train of the narrow-gauge railway left Ploče on 5 November 1966. The correspondent of Slobodna Dalmacija wrote on that occasion:

U subotu je iz Ploča, po specijalnom voznom redu, krenuo posljednji vlak na uskoj pruzi Sarajevo - Ploče. Kompozicija putničkoga vlaka s lokomotivom br. 83-146, kojom je upravljao mašinovođa Alija Klepo, svečano je ispraćena u Pločama... Na svim usputnim stanicama duž čitave trase, građani su izašli da na rastanku pozdrave njegov odlazak s ovog područja. [On Saturday, the specially scheduled last train on the narrow gauge Sarajevo-Ploče railway departed Ploče. The passenger train, powered by locomotive No. 83-146 and operated by engineer Alija Klepo, was ceremonially farewelled from Ploče... Members of the public waited at every station along the line to farewell its final departure from this area.]

— Slobodna Dalmacija, br. 6749, 7. studenoga 1966 [Slobodna Dalmacija newspaper, issue no. 6749, 7 November 1966].

Parts of the original line were flooded by the creation of a number of hydroelectric dams along the river. The standard gauge line was officially opened on 26 and 27 November 1966. The new railway was put into traffic on 1 December 1966, and traction was initially performed by diesel locomotives because the railway was in the first stage of construction. The electrification of the railway and the electrical relay protection of the stations was completed and put into operation in May 1969. The final completion of the works on the railway was in 1972, with the completion of the remote traffic control system and power plants for powering the catenary network. The final price of the works on the railway amounted to 1.15 billion dinars. Together with the Vrpolje-Sarajevo line, this line made up 24% of the railway network in Bosnia and Herzegovina at the time (the total length of both lines was 450.5 km), and 60% of the work and 65% of the revenue of ŽTP Sarajevo, and at that time it was the most modern railway of the then state.

=== Modernization Effects ===
Development of freight and passenger traffic in 1968–1988 to Ploče train station (black) and the Port of Ploče (red)

The Sarajevo–Ploče line

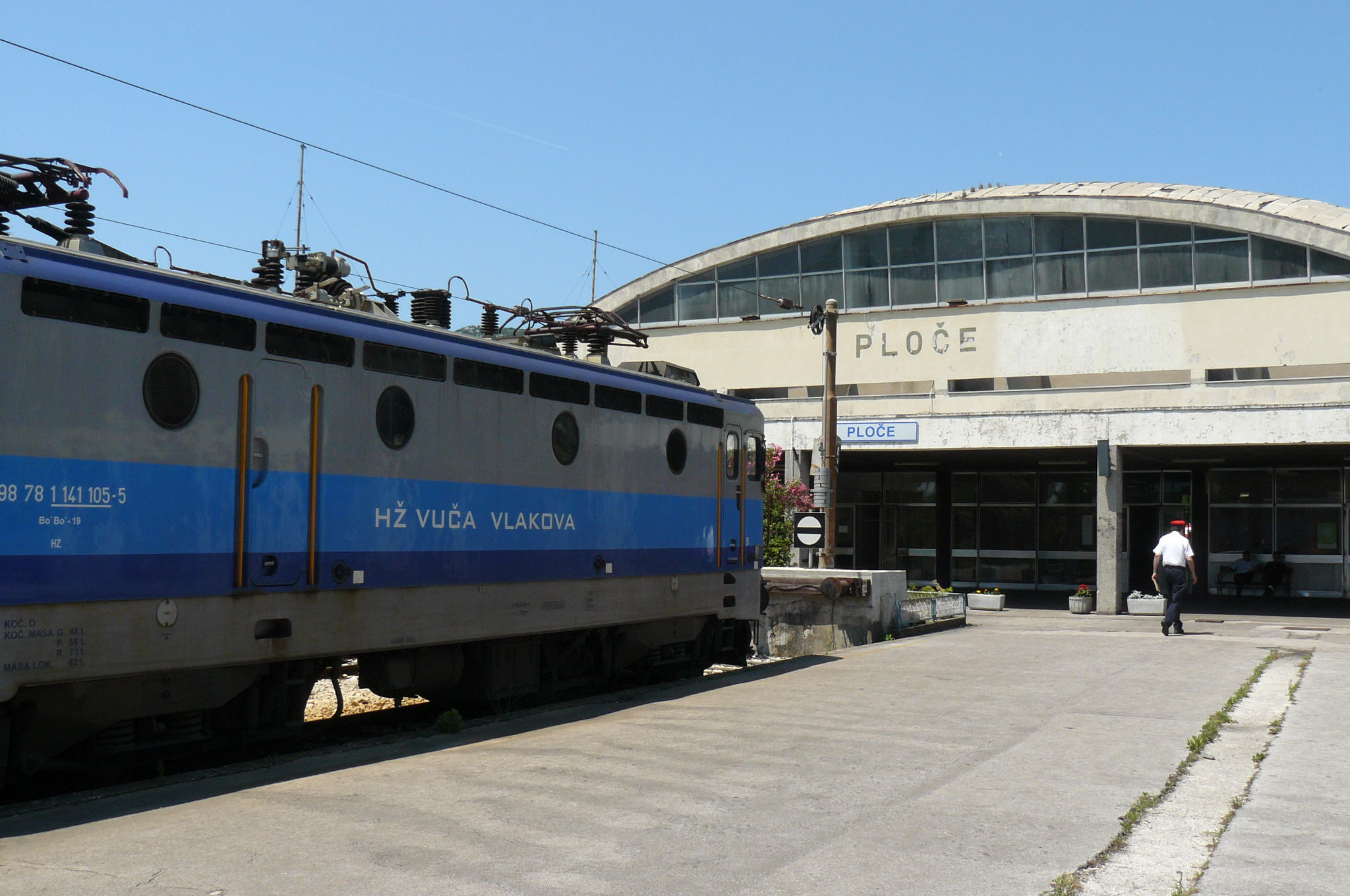
HŽ locomotive series 1141 in Ploče

With the electrification of the railway, goods traffic recorded constant growth. By 1969, the turnover of goods at Ploče railway station amounted to 1.03 million tons. Already in 1971, the turnover doubled (2.09 million tons), reaching 2.86 million tons in 1977 and 3.61 million tons in 1987. At the same time, passenger traffic was declining: 482,000 passengers departed from the Ploče railway station in 1969, 384,000 in 1971, 296,000 in 1977, and 173,000 in 1987.

Due to the integration of the Port of Ploče and ŽTP Sarajevo in 1969, work began on expanding the port's capacity in Ploče. The increase in the volume of freight traffic on the railway was accompanied by an increase in traffic in the port of Ploče. Thus, traffic in the port increased from 1.1 million tons in 1969 to 2.3 million tons in 1971, when an oil-receiving facility with a capacity of 1.5 million tons per year was built. The increase in the capacity of the port in Ploče continued with the construction of a terminal for the transport of live livestock, wood, grain, and alumina, so the port in Ploče acquired the conditions for transit cargo from Central European countries. Already in 1977, the traffic of the port amounted to 2.95 million tons, and thanks to the development of large companies in Bosnia and Herzegovina (Željezara Zenica, KHK Lukavac, Aluminij Mostar) was constantly increasing, so in 1987 it exceeded 4.5 million tons.

=== Breakup of Yugoslavia ===
With the independence of Croatia in 1991, the Croatian section of the line was transferred to the newly formed railway company Hrvatske željeznice (HŽ), while the remaining section north of Metković remained within Bosnia and Herzegovina (then still a constituent republic of SFRY). This section was transferred to Željeznice Federacije Bosne i Hercegovine (ŽFBH) in 1993 following Bosnia's declaration of independence. On the eve of the war itself, in 1992, a large part of the railway infrastructure in BiH was modernized, including the rolling stock and traction vehicles, and the tracks were overhauled The war in Bosnia and Herzegovina led to the suspension of traffic on most railway lines. Although on a much smaller scale than before the war, traffic on part of this railway was also carried out during the war, namely on the section Ploče - Čapljina and Mostar-Baćevići and later (with the establishment of Željeznice Herceg Bosne) also from the suburbs of Mostar to Čapljina. According to data from Željeznice FBiH, war damage to facilities and infrastructure in BiH amounted to about 854 million US dollars. The port in Ploče also suffered indirect war damage, which during the war operated at 5-10% of its capacity, and the pre-war volume of traffic was overtaken only in 2008 (5.1 million tons).

== Current status ==
Today, three railway operators operate the line. In the territory of BiH, Željeznice FBiH operates (including the Čapljina station), and further in the territory of Croatia, HŽ Cargo and Enna Transport operate. Since 2010, passenger services uses Talgo trains. The passenger service connecting Sarajevo and Ploče ceased operating in December 2013 and resumed again after almost 9 years. According to data from the State Bureau of Statistics, in 2012, traffic of 1,118,962 tons (loading 788,674 t, unloading 329,288 t) was recorded at the railway station in Ploče. The number of passengers was 7,935, which was significantly lower compared to the period before the War in Croatia. The line was closed from 2015-2017 for repairs and upgrades. Passenger service did not extend into Croatia; the final distance from Čapljina at the BiH-Croatia border to Ploče was operated as a rail replacement bus service. Nonetheless, during the summer of 2022, the Talgo service from Sarajevo was extended to the Croatian coastal town of Ploče during the weekends. From 1 July to 11 September 2022. the train operated three times a week, on Fridays, Saturdays and Sundays.

In 2018 The Guardian named the line "among the most beautiful in the world" among the 18 countries in the world where you can best experience the adventure of travelling by train.

== Usage ==
The line is used by the following services:

- Sarajevo - Konjic - Mostar - Čapljina Brzi voz (Talgo)
- Sarajevo - Konjic Lokalni voz
- Metković - Ploče

== Gallery ==
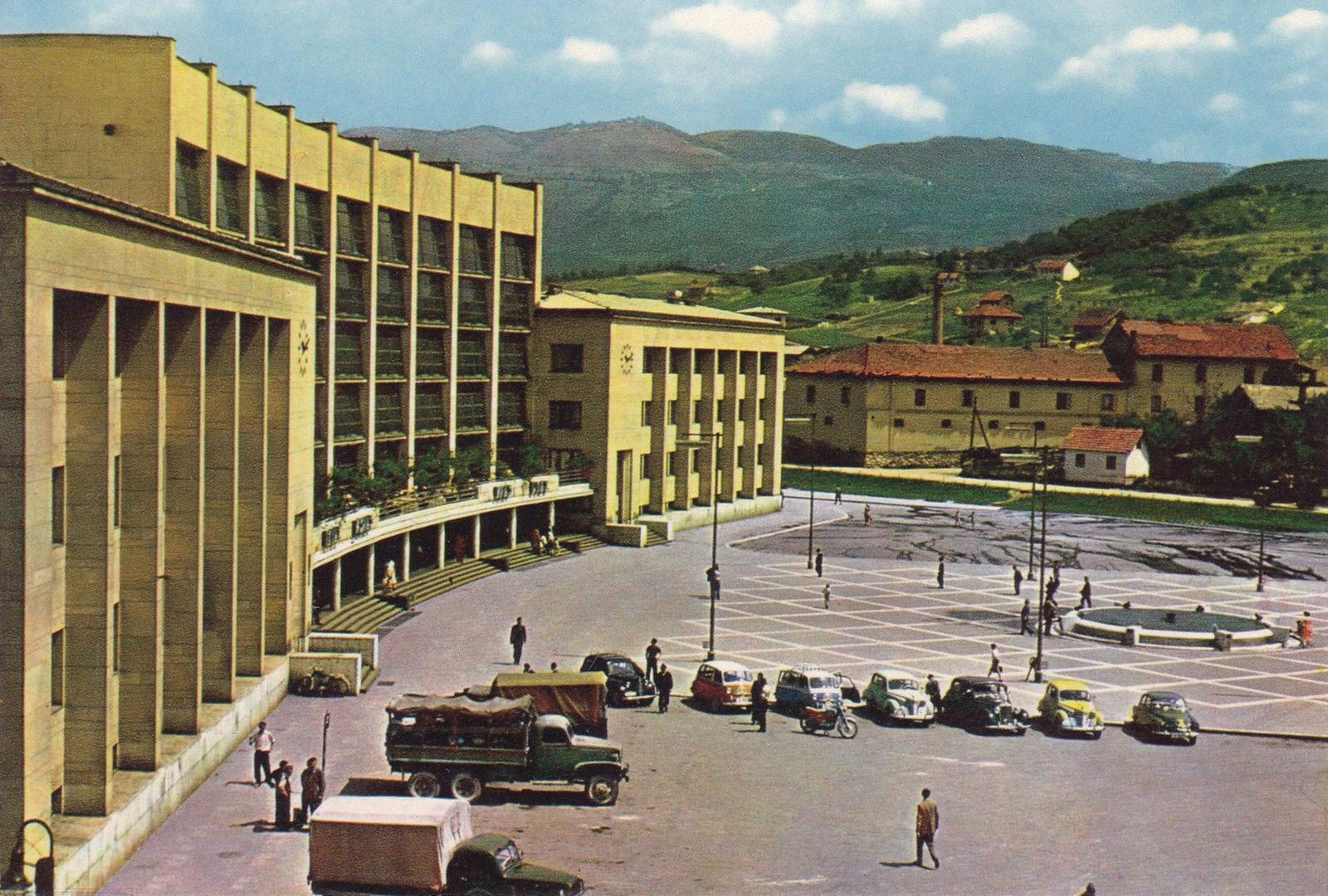
Sarajevo railway station around 1960

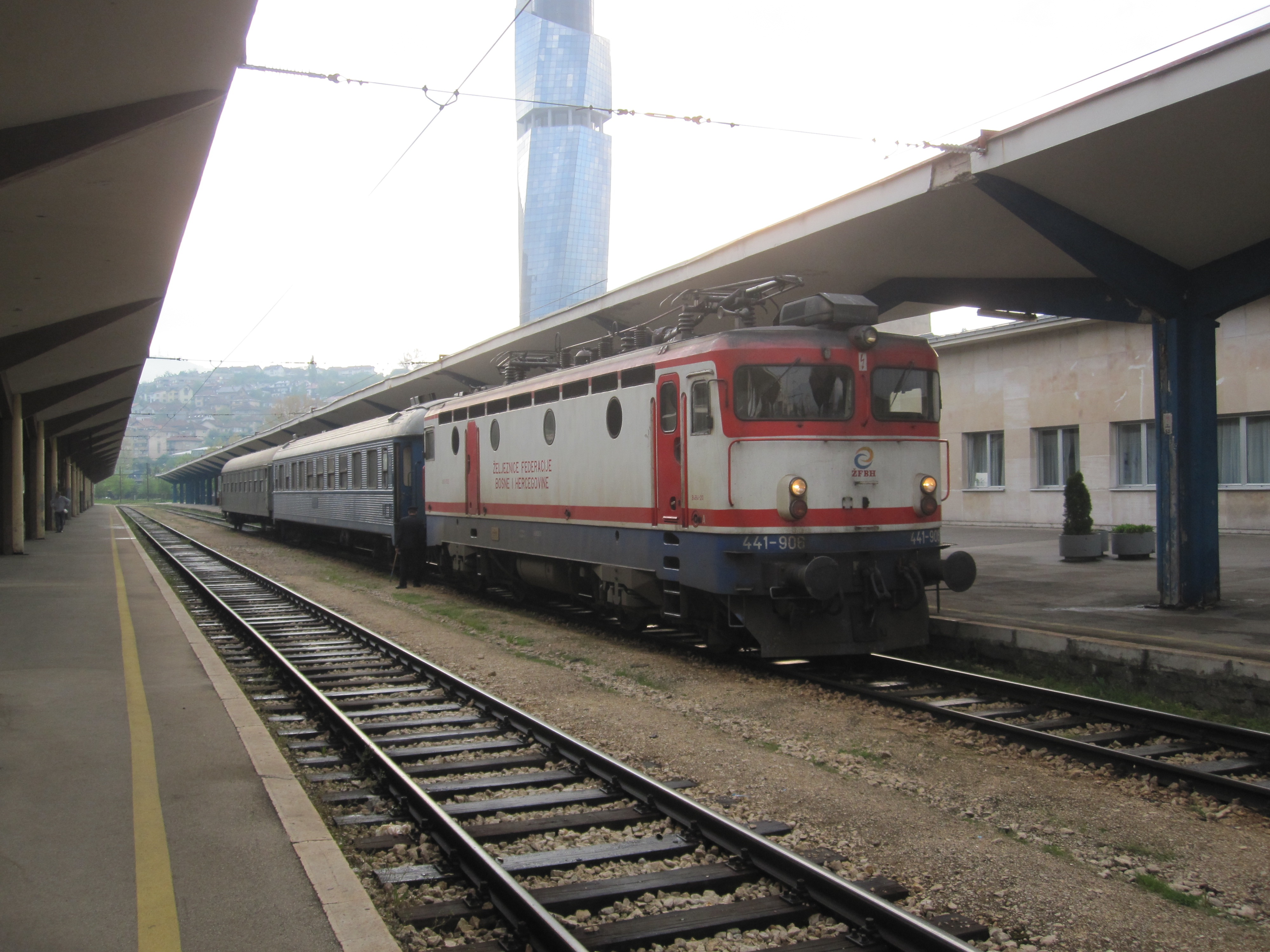
Class 441 electric loco with two coaches (ex-SJ) at Sarajevo main railway station, May 2011

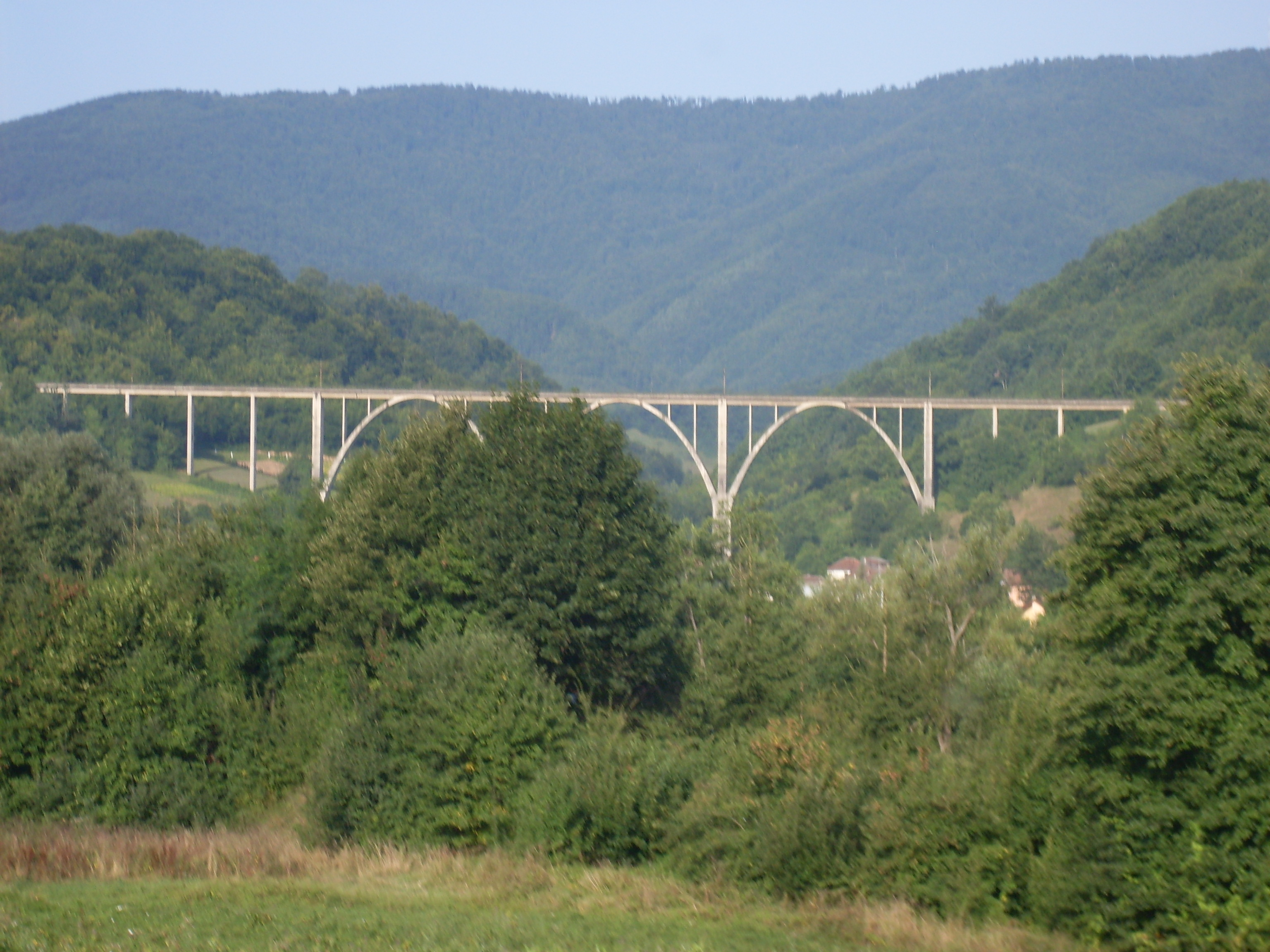
Railway bridge near Sarajevo

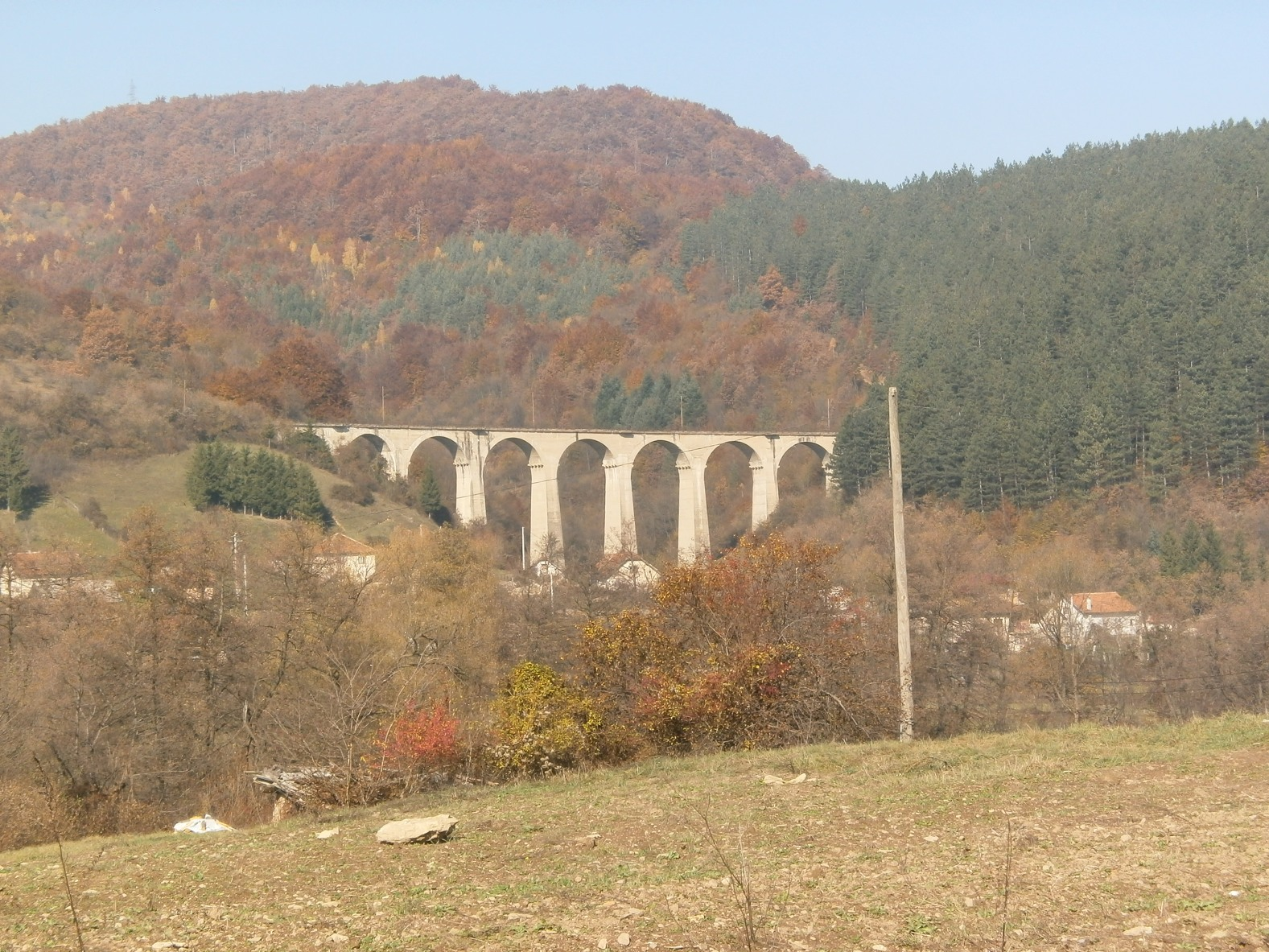
Viaduct near Tarčin

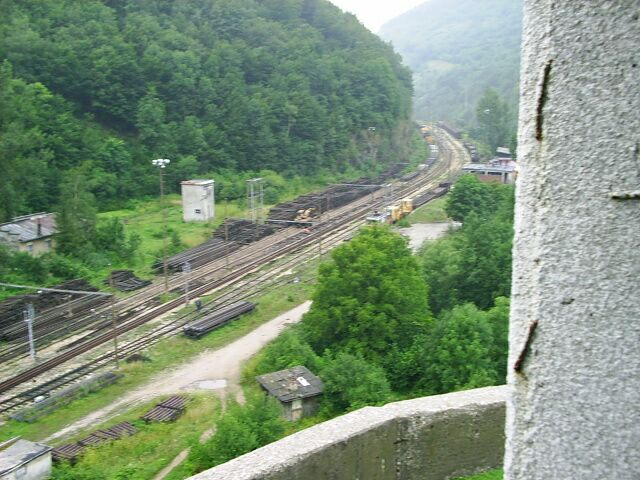
Bradina railway station, Bosnia and Herzegovina, 2012

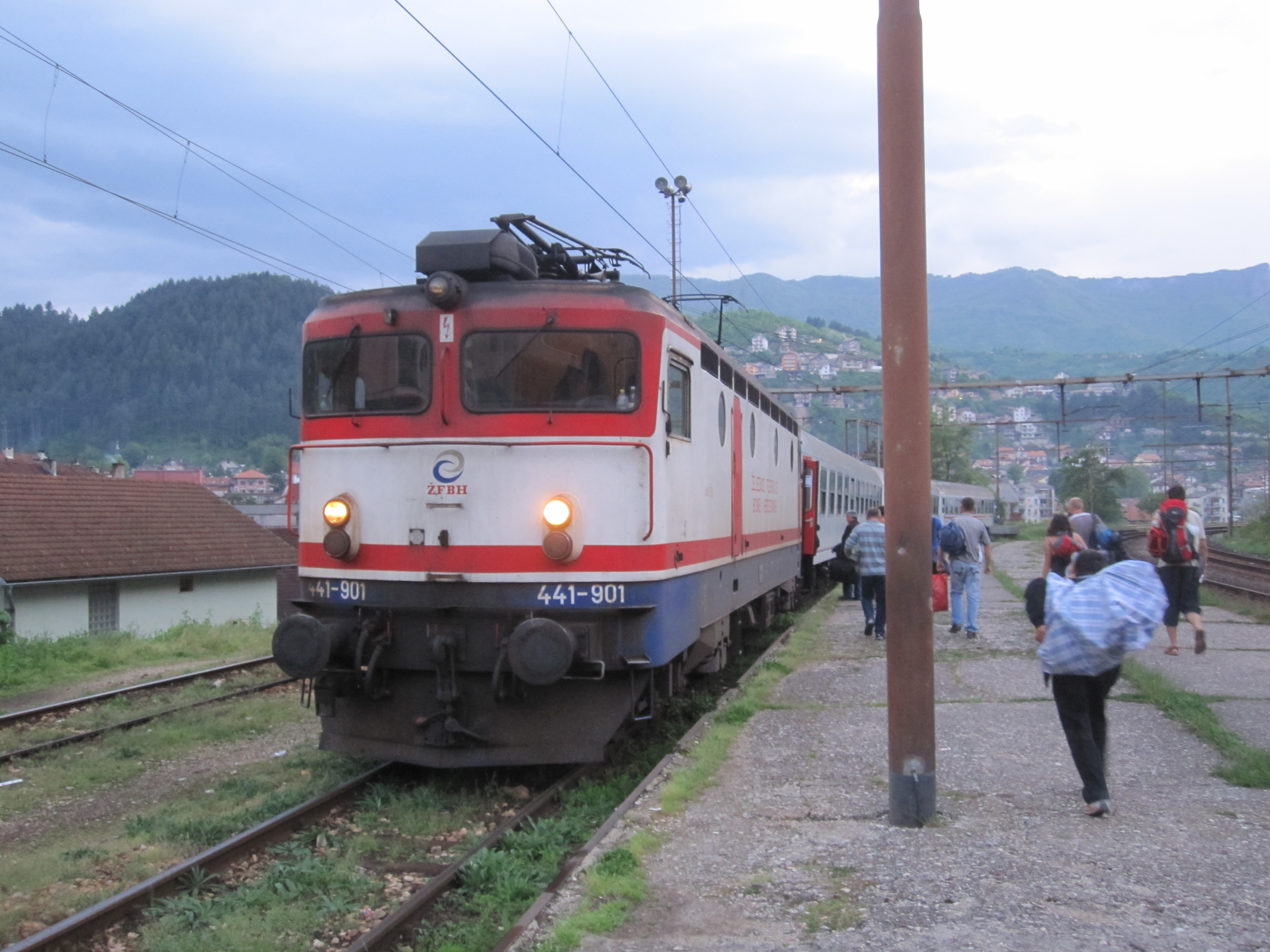
ŽFBH 441.901 at Konjic railway station

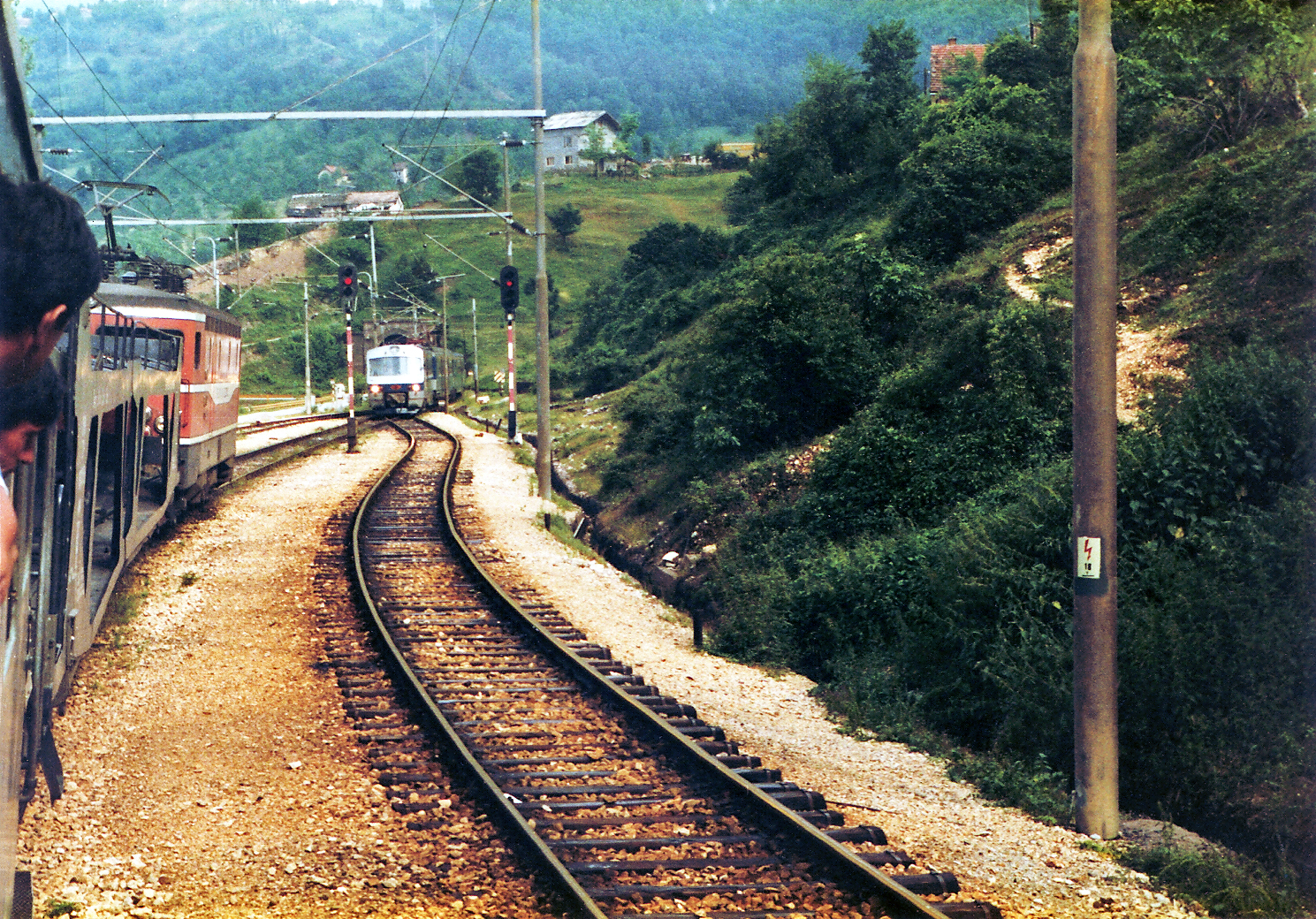
Train in Ostrožac near Jablanica, 1982

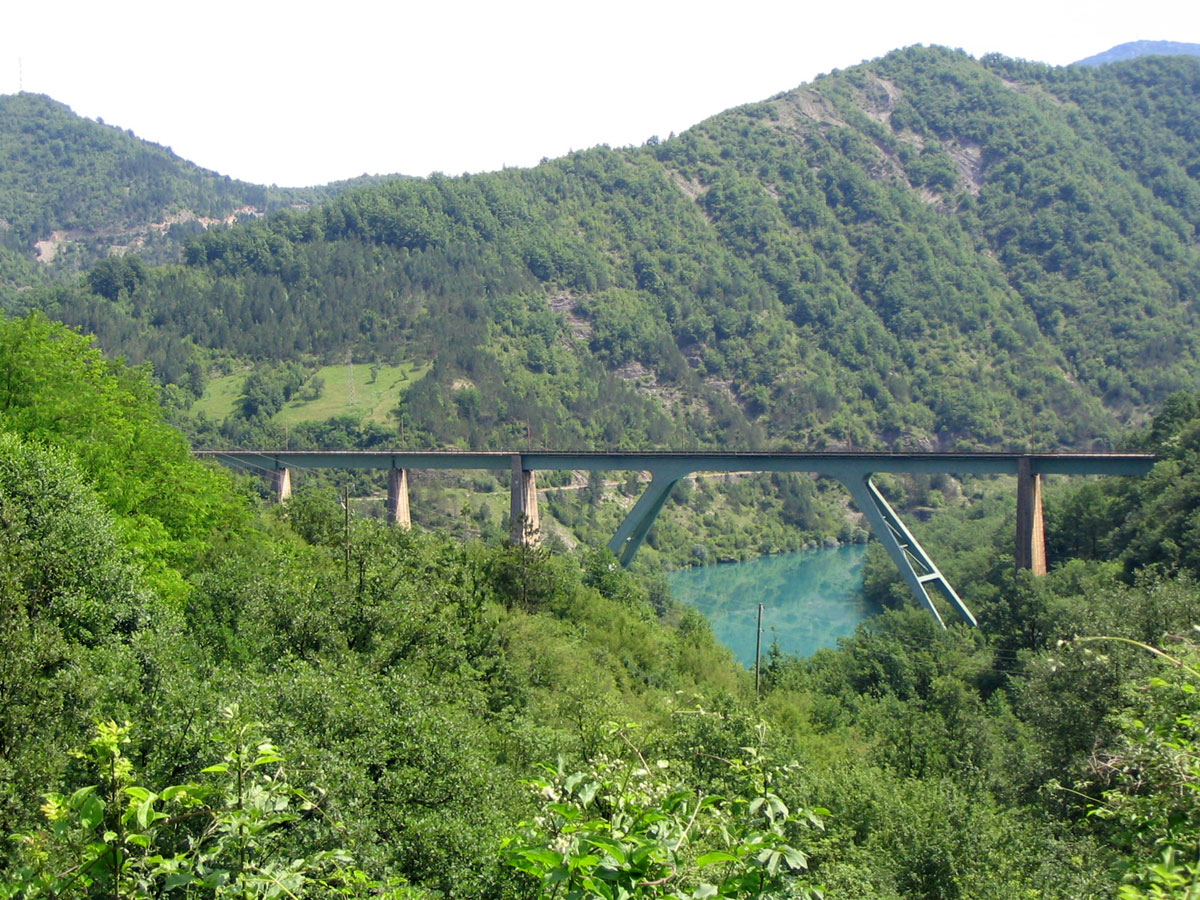
Neretva railway bridge, south of Jablanica, 2007

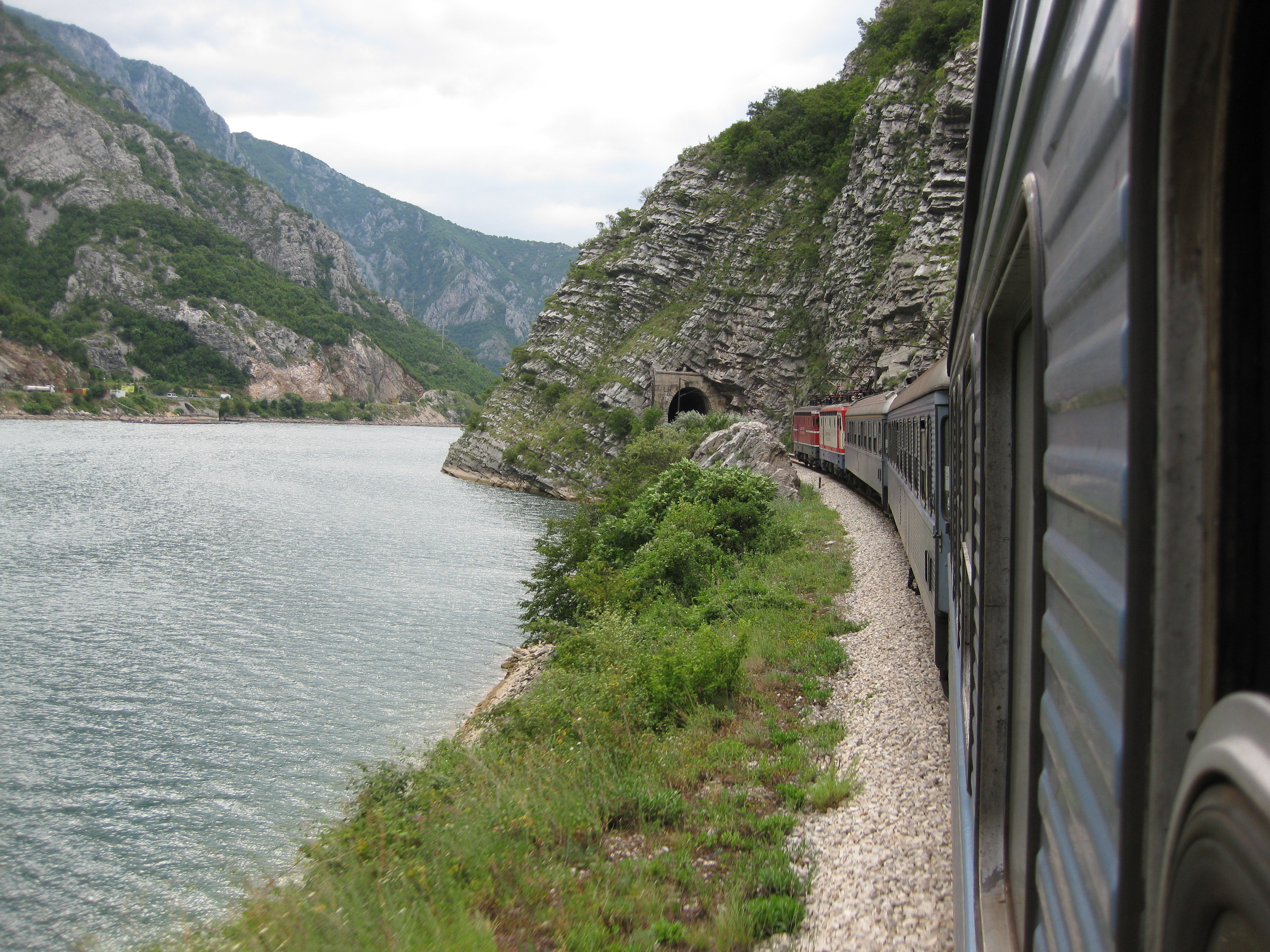
Photo taken from train between Jablanica and Mostar (Neretva-valley)

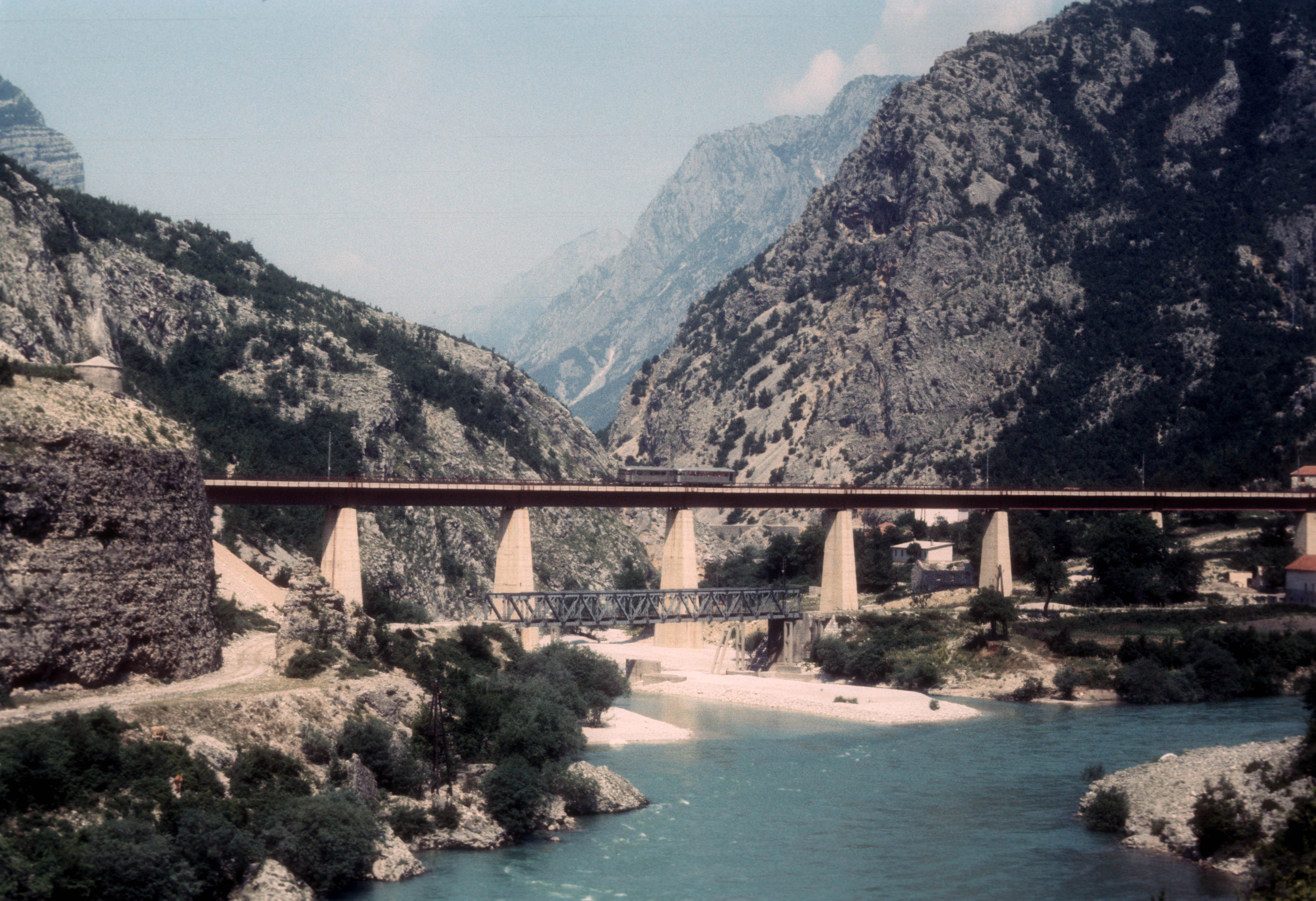
Regional train near Drežanka

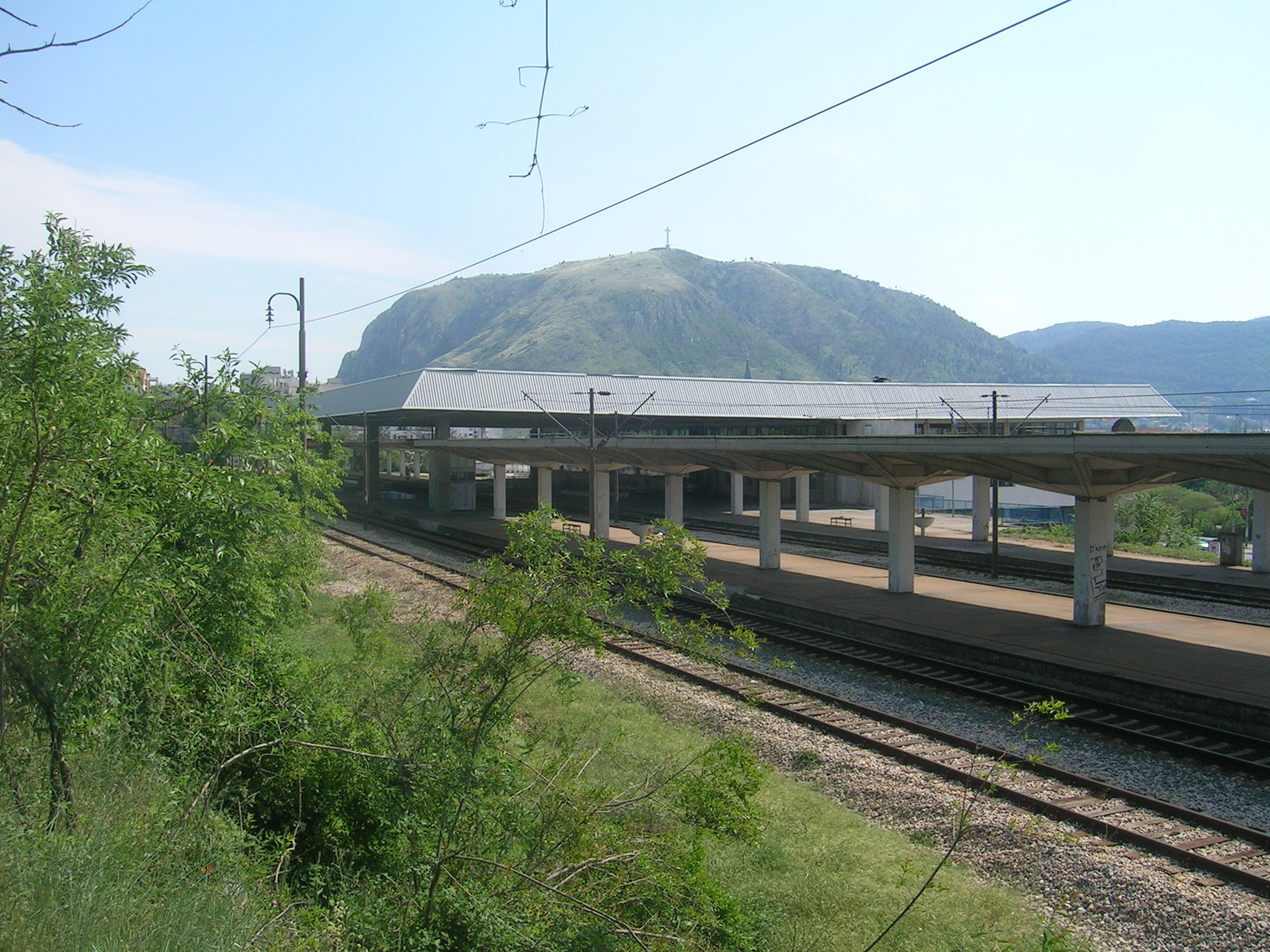
Platforms of Mostar railway station, in the background Hum mountain, May 2012

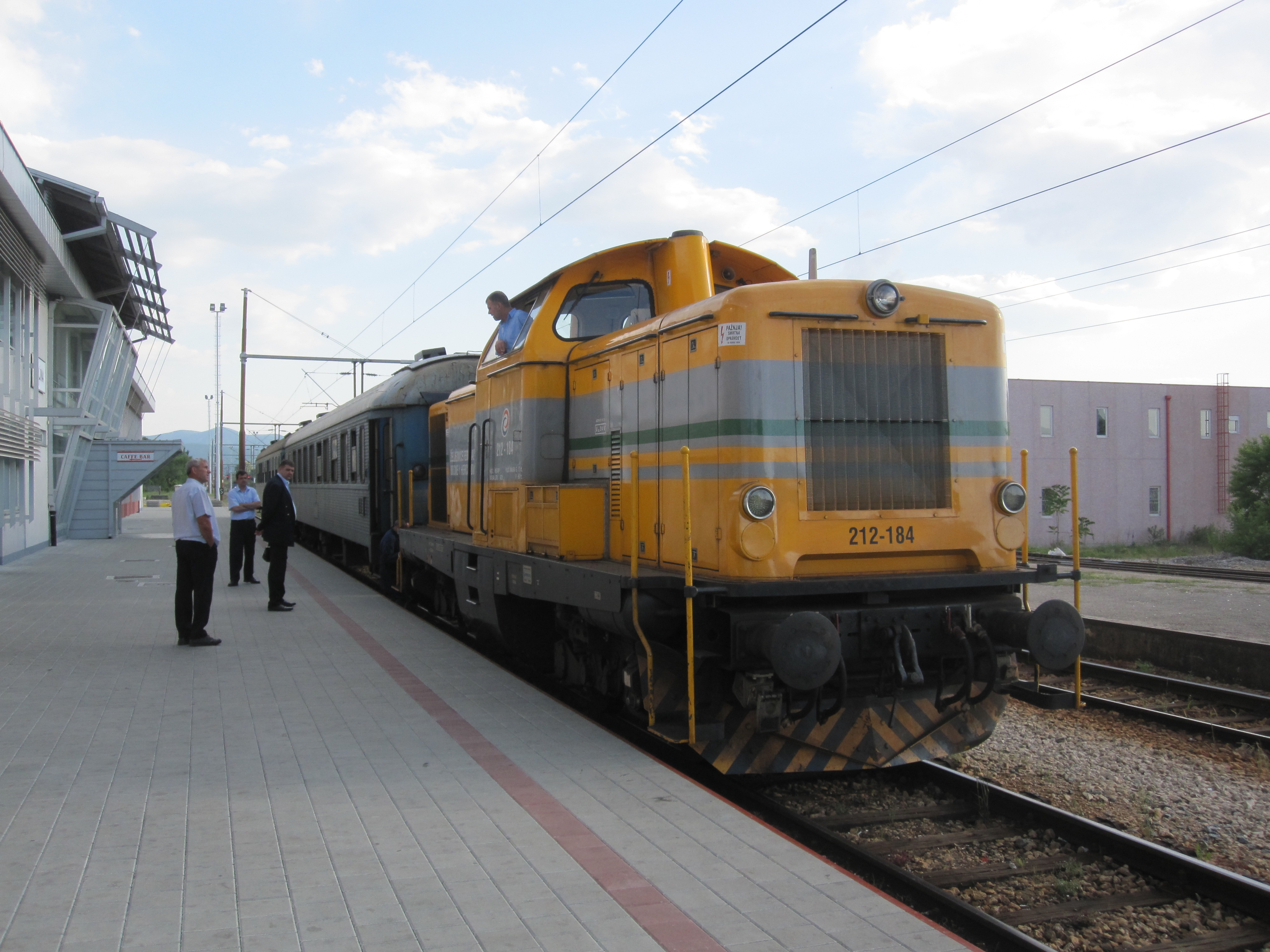
Čapljina border station, with an ex-DB 212.184 diesel.

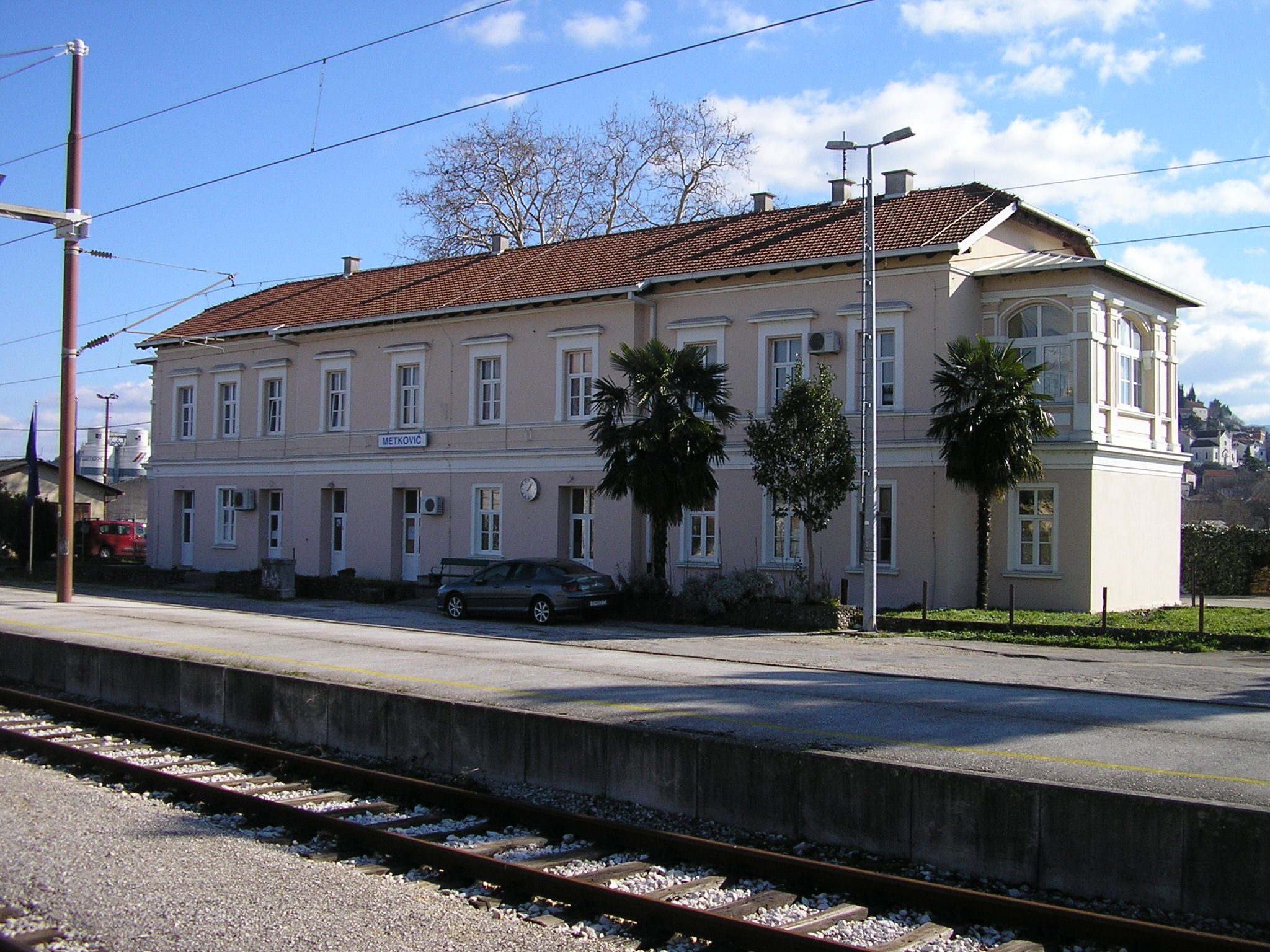
Metković railway station

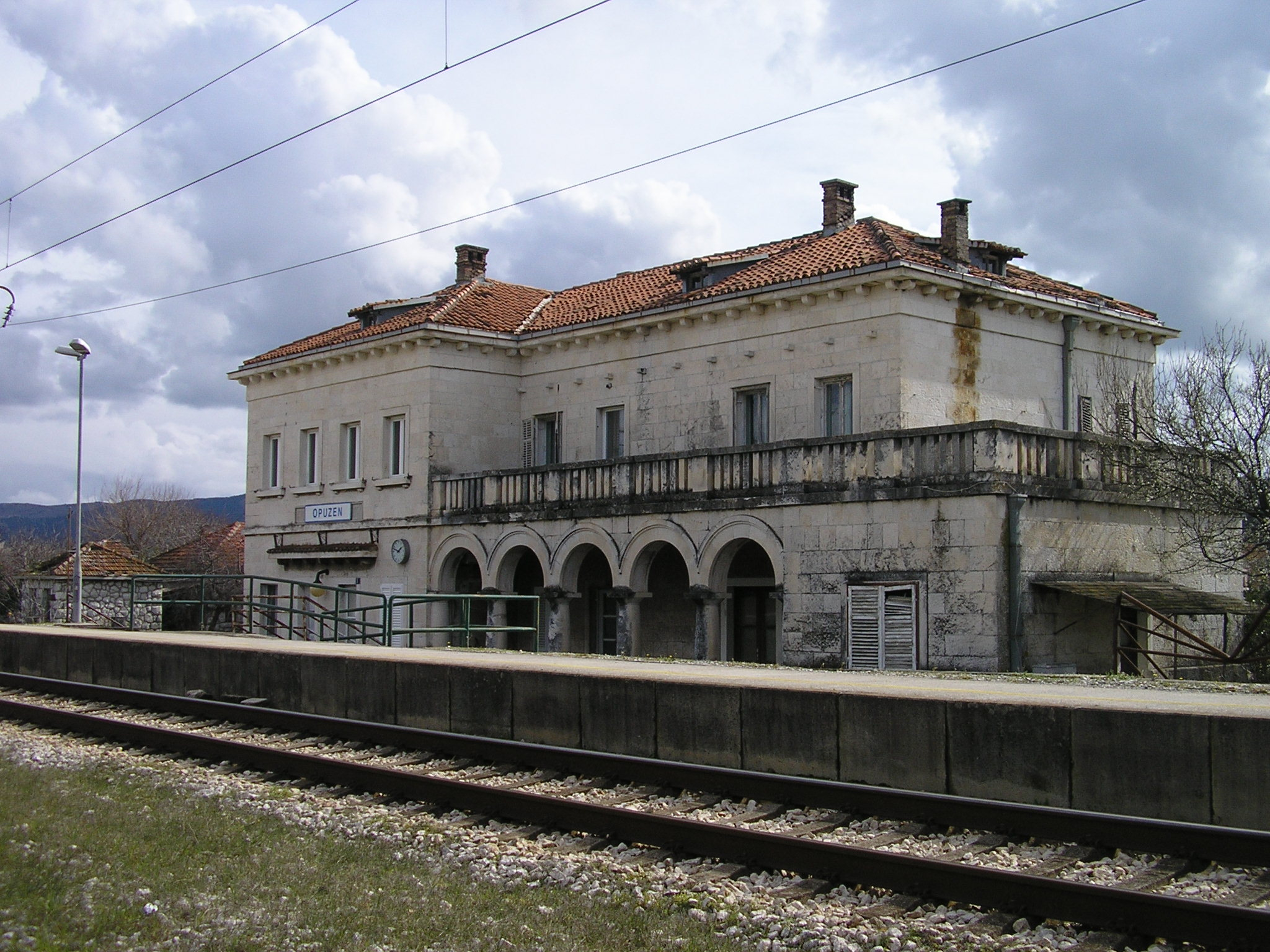
Opuzen railway station

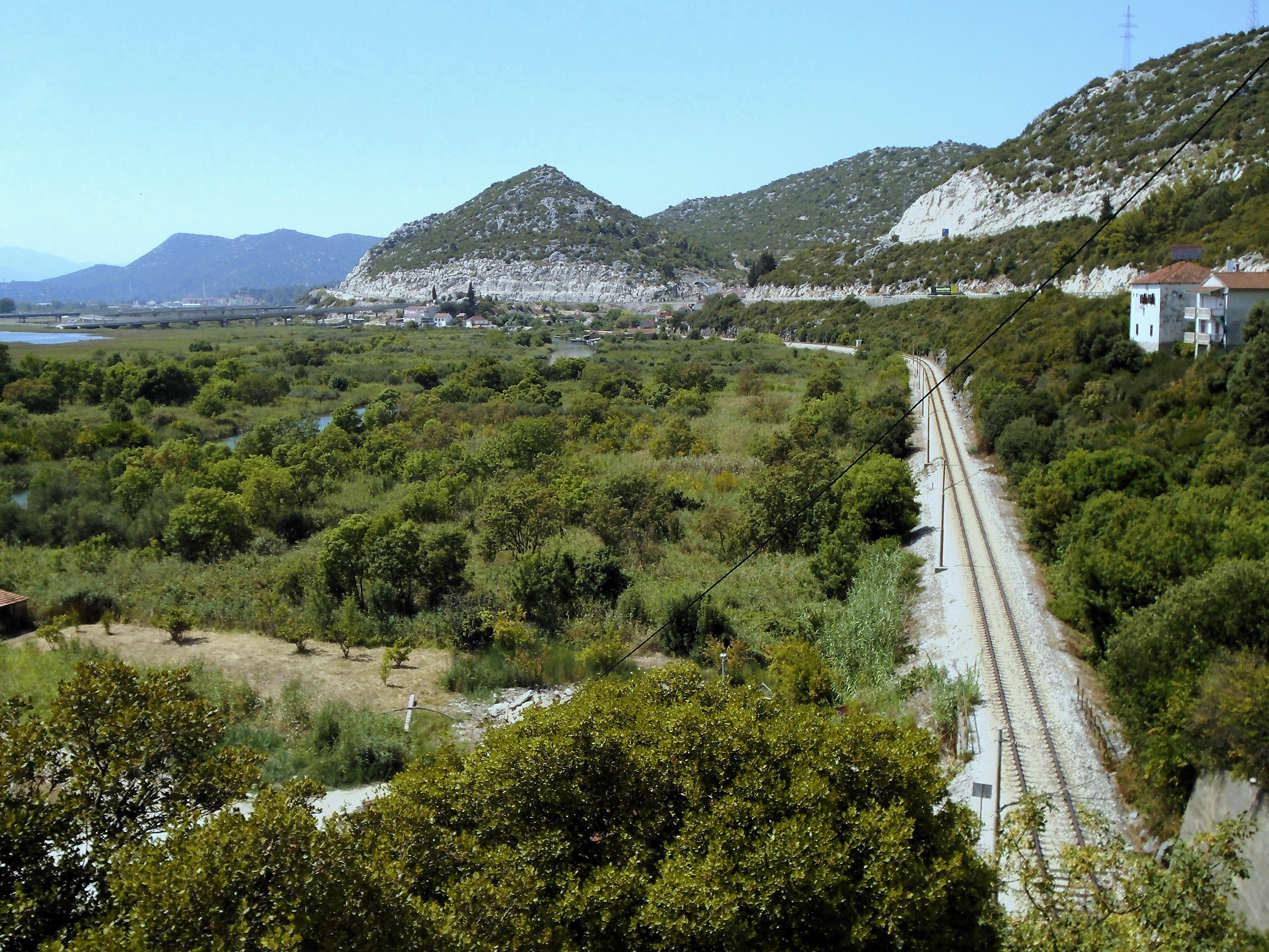
Railway line at Rogotin

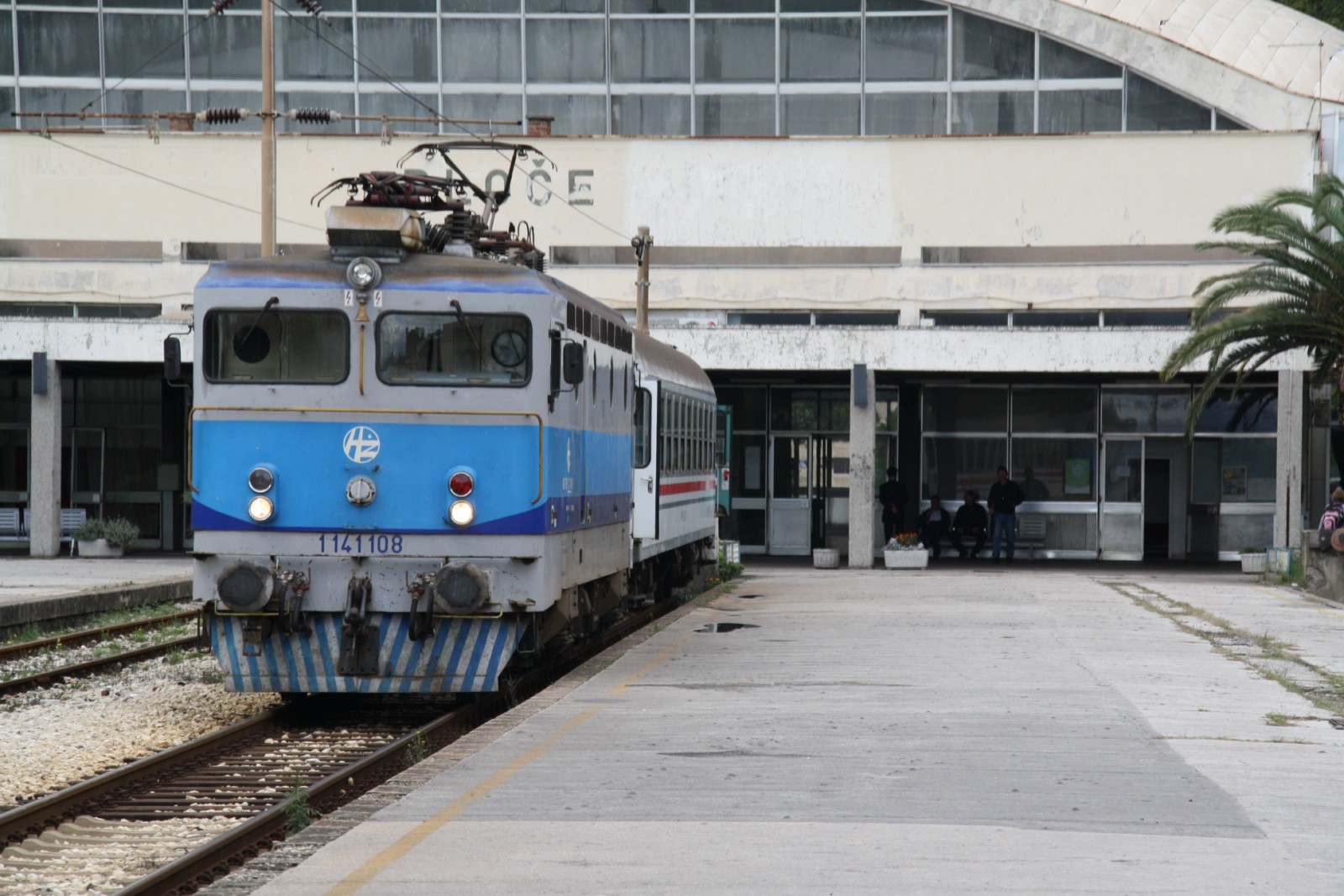
Ploče railway station, 2009
