= Sarajevo main railway station =

Railway station in Sarajevo, Bosnia and Herzegovina

Sarajevo main railway station Glavna željeznička stanica u Sarajevu
- Sarajevo main railway station in 2019

General information
- Location: Sarajevo, Trg žrtava genocida u Srebrenici; Bosnia and Herzegovina
- Coordinates: 43°51′37″N 18°23′57″E
- Owner: ŽFBH
- Platforms: 3(5)
- Tracks: 5
- Train operators: ŽFBH

Construction
- Structure type: at-grade
- Platform levels: 1
- Parking: Yes
- Cycle facilities: No
- Architect: Bedřich Hacar; Bogdan Stojkov

Other information
- Status: Staffed
- Website: https://www.zfbh.ba

History
- Opened: 1882
- Rebuilt: 1949
Location
- Location within Bosnia and Herzegovina

Sarajevo main railway station (Bosnian: Glavna željeznička stanica u Sarajevu) is a railway station in Sarajevo, the capital of Bosnia and Herzegovina, located in the northwest part of the city, approximately 3 kilometers from the downtown area near Marijin Dvor.

== Construction ==
The building has a semi-circular ground plan and is roofed with hyperbolic paraboloid structures. In front of it there is an extensive open-air area and a tramway terminal. The square in front of the station is named after the victims of the Srebrenica massacre (Bosnian: Trg žrtava genocida u Srebrenici). Tracks are entering the station from the west and then turning north, after few hundred meters rail line ends since dismantling of narrow-gauge line to Uvac, Rudo close to Serbian borders in 1978.

== History ==
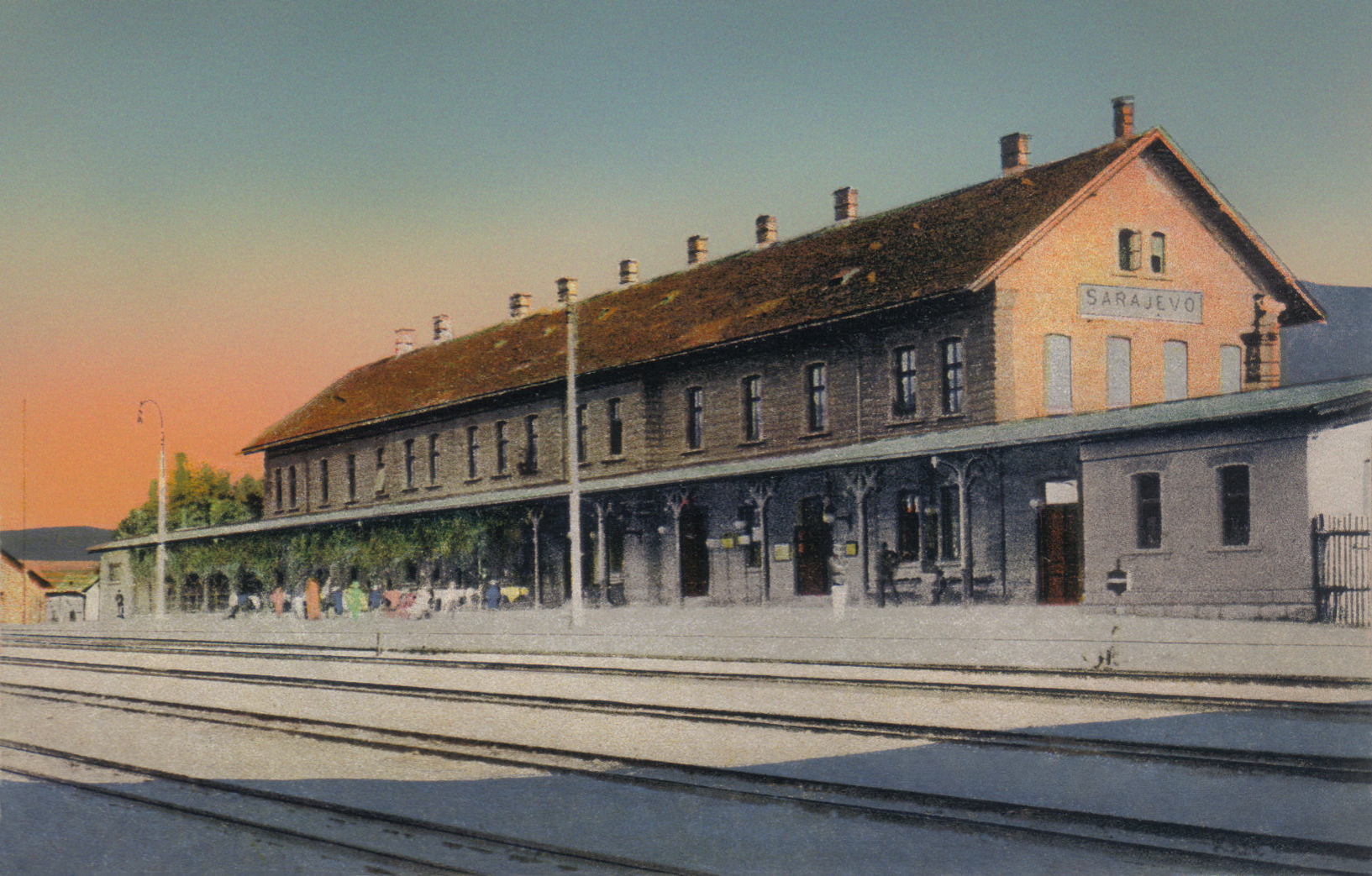
Original station built in 1882

The railway station was built in 1882 for the narrow gauge railway, while Bosnia was under Austro-Hungarian rule. Near it, further west of the city were the main railway depot for the whole of Bosnia, where a thousand people were employed at the peak.

In September 1941, the transport of the Sarajevo Jews was dispatched from there by the resolution of Ustashe administration. The Jews were transported in wagons for the cattle to a transfer camp in Travnik. After World War II, it was decided to replace war damaged old station by a new functionalist building designed by Czechoslovak architects led by Bedřich Hacar.

The designers and most of the technical staff leave Sarajevo, and the Ministry of Construction of the then People's Republic of Bosnia and Herzegovina continued the construction. The project is headed by the assistant minister, architect Jahiel Finci (one of the founders of the Technical Faculty and the Collegium Artisticum movement), assisted by colleagues Muhamed Kadić and Emanuel Šamanek, and engineers Bogdan Stojkov and Lorenc Eichberger.

An agreement was made with the German prisoners of war, who participated in the construction of the station as workers, that they would continue the work without constant technical supervision, and in return, their living conditions were improved and a promise was made that they would be released as soon as the construction was finished. In its time, it was one of the few projects in the city that was not influenced by socialist realism. However, due to the political turmoil in Czechoslovak-Yugoslav relations, they could not complete their work. Finally, the Croatian architect Bogdan Stojkov finished the new departure hall. The reasons for the construction of the new railway station were several; the track to Sarajevo was rebuilt to a standard gauge of 1435 mm, longer trains were expected and would be not possible to service them. The ceremonial completion of the station building took place in 1953.

The station was electrified in 1967, as part of the early electrification programme introduced in Bosnia up to 1969. The Sarajevo–Ploče railway provides a connection to the Adriatic coast. It holds the distinction of being the first 25 kV AC-electrified country in the former Yugoslavia, followed by Croatia and Serbia (both countries introduced electric trains in 1970).

In 1971, the original historic station building was abandoned and pulled down. Railway equipment was damaged between 1992 and 1995, but it was eventually rebuilt in the late 1990s. Today it is one of the recognizable attractions of the city.

The Commission to Preserve National Monuments, at a session held in 2016, declared the Railway station (with the square to the front of the buildings) as a national monument of Bosnia and Herzegovina.

== Routes ==
The station is at the junction of Bosnia and Herzegovina's two most important railway lines. The Sarajevo–Ploče railway line via Konjic, Mostar and Čapljina is an electrified, single-track main national long-distance transport route, which is developed for 70 km/h (ŽFBH) or 100 km/h (HŽ) and is part of the Pan-European Corridor Vc. In Sarajevo, long-distance passenger transport is transferred to the also electrified and partly double-track railway line via Zenica to Doboj, which can be traveled at speeds of up to 70 km/h. Both passenger and freight trains run on these two routes towards Šamac and Ploče. The Sarajevo-Šamac section is operated by the ŽFBH and the ŽRS. The Sarajevo–Ploče railway line, on the other hand, is shared by the public limited company owned by the Federation and the Croatian State Railways.

The following route book routes meet in Sarajevo :

- KBS 11: Sarajevo – Konjic – Mostar – Čapljina – Metković – Opuzen – Ploče
- KBS 12: Sarajevo – Zenica – Zavidovići – Doboj – Modriča – Šamac

== Services ==
In 2009, after nearly 18 years, rail traffic resumed between Sarajevo and Belgrade (approximately 500 km/310 miles), only to be cancelled in 2012.

However, since 2016, there are no trains towards Zagreb. The only connections with Croatia resumed service in June 2023 on the Sarajevo-Ploče line.

== Gallery ==
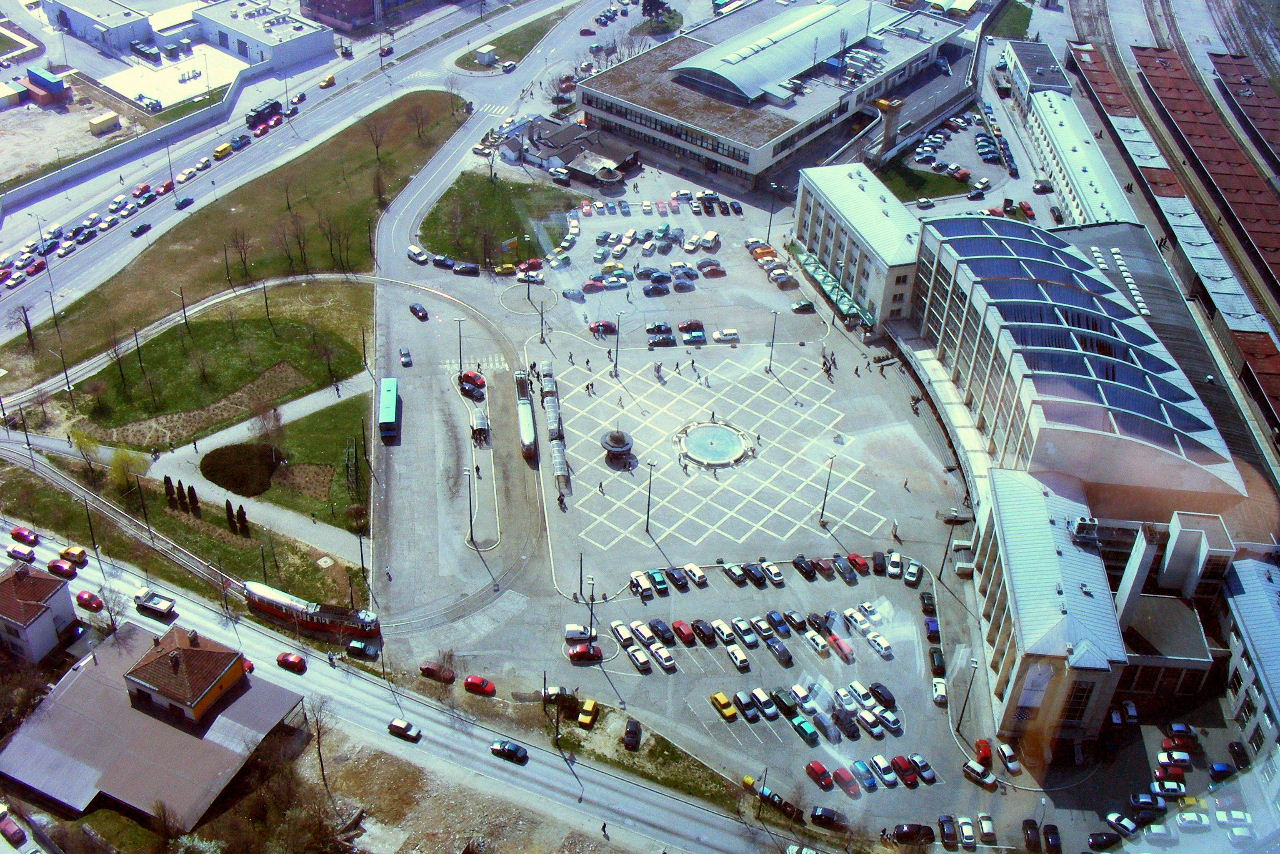
View from the Avaz Twist Tower

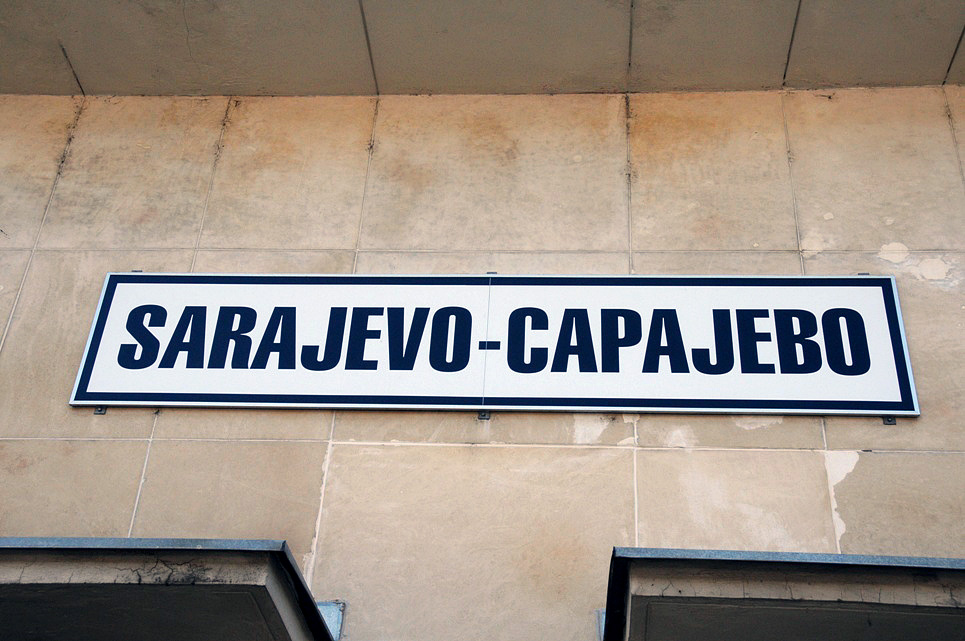
A sign at platform level, with the name in Bosnian/Croatian and Serbian.

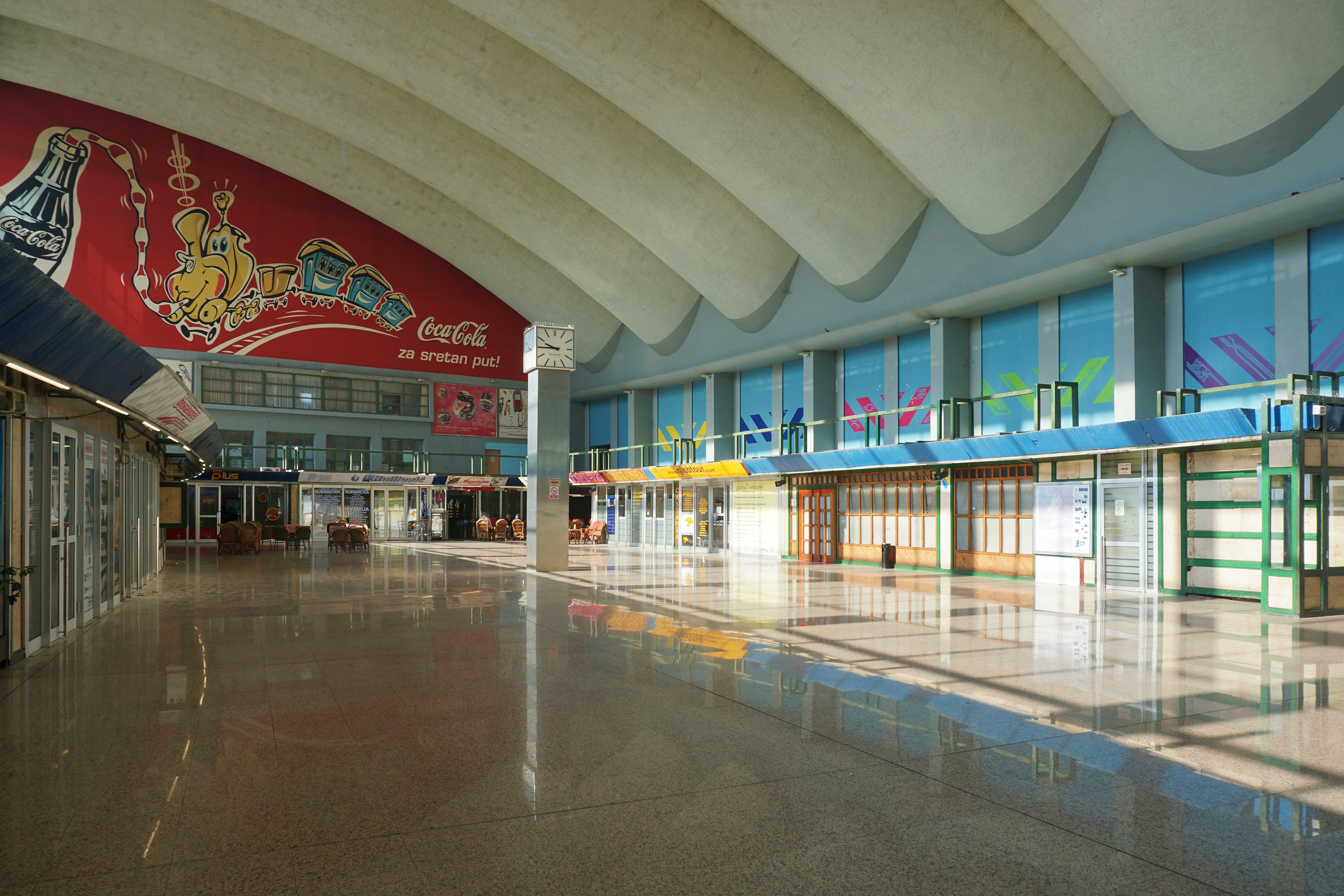
The booking Hall in 2019

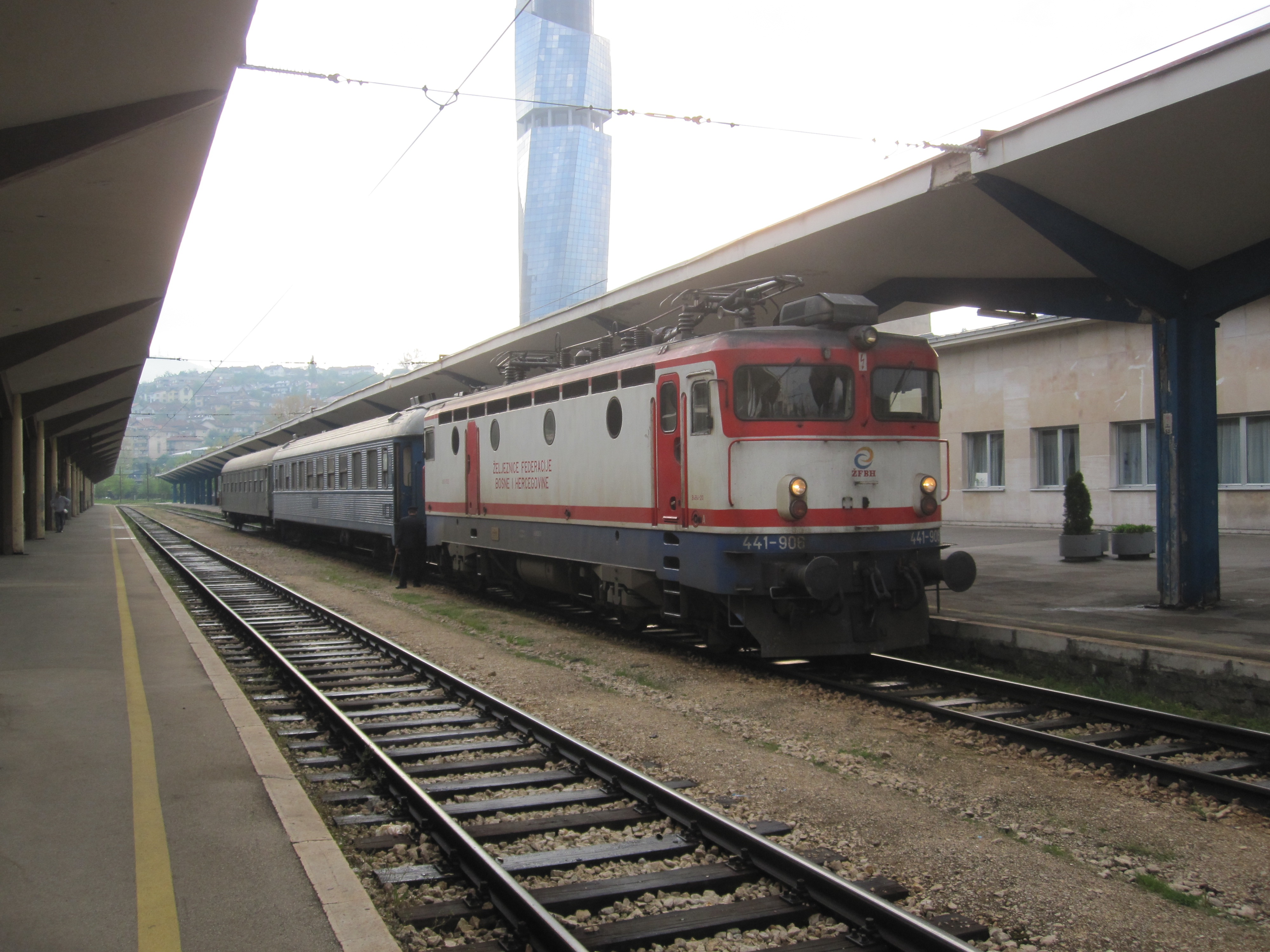
ŽFBH 441.906

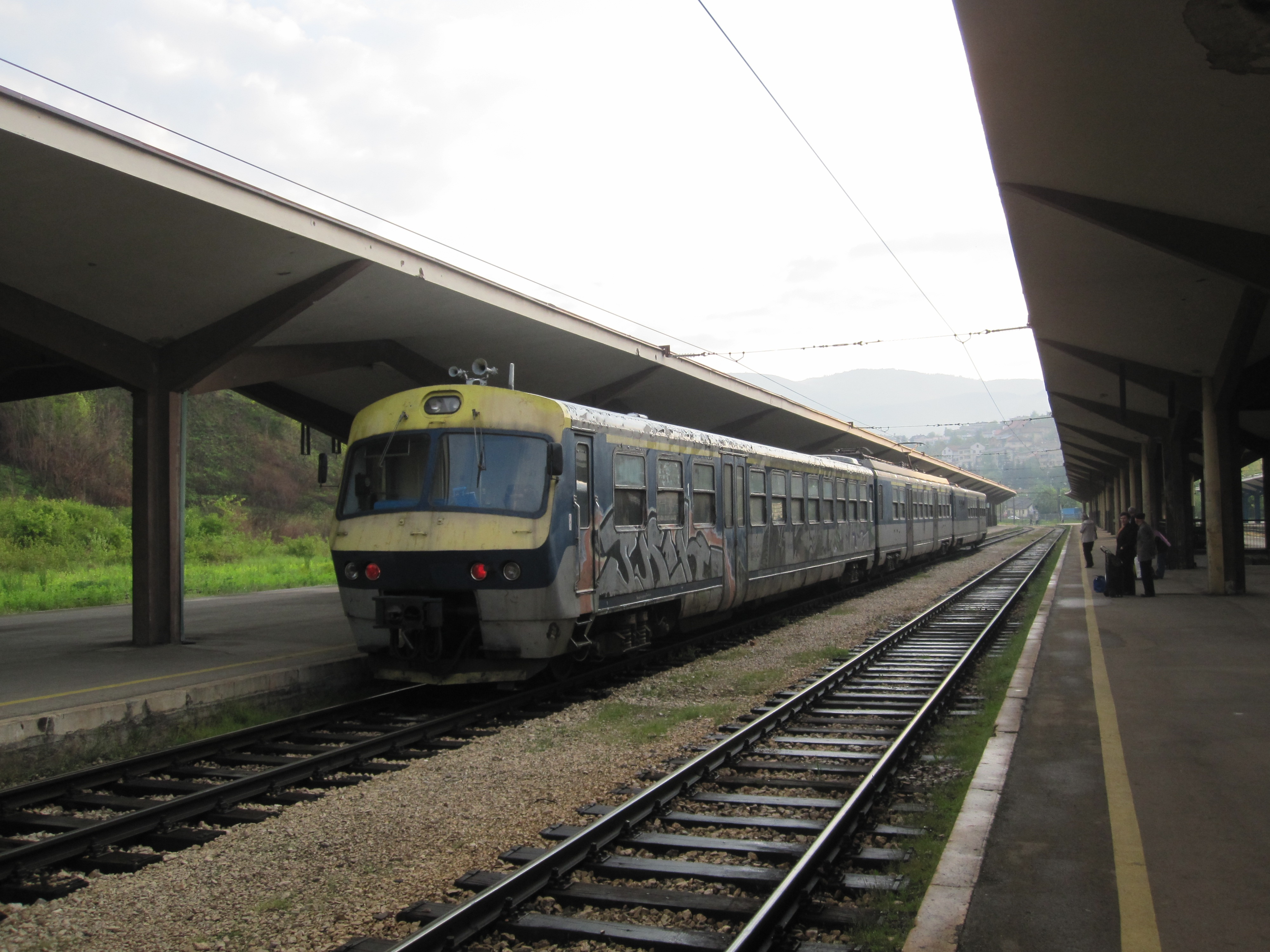
ŽFBH EMU

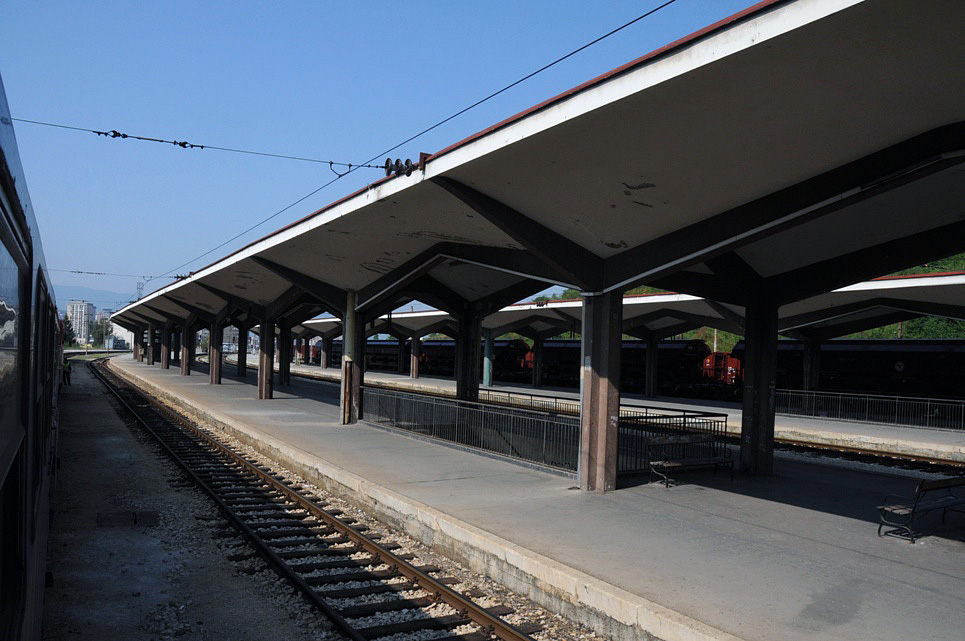
Platforms

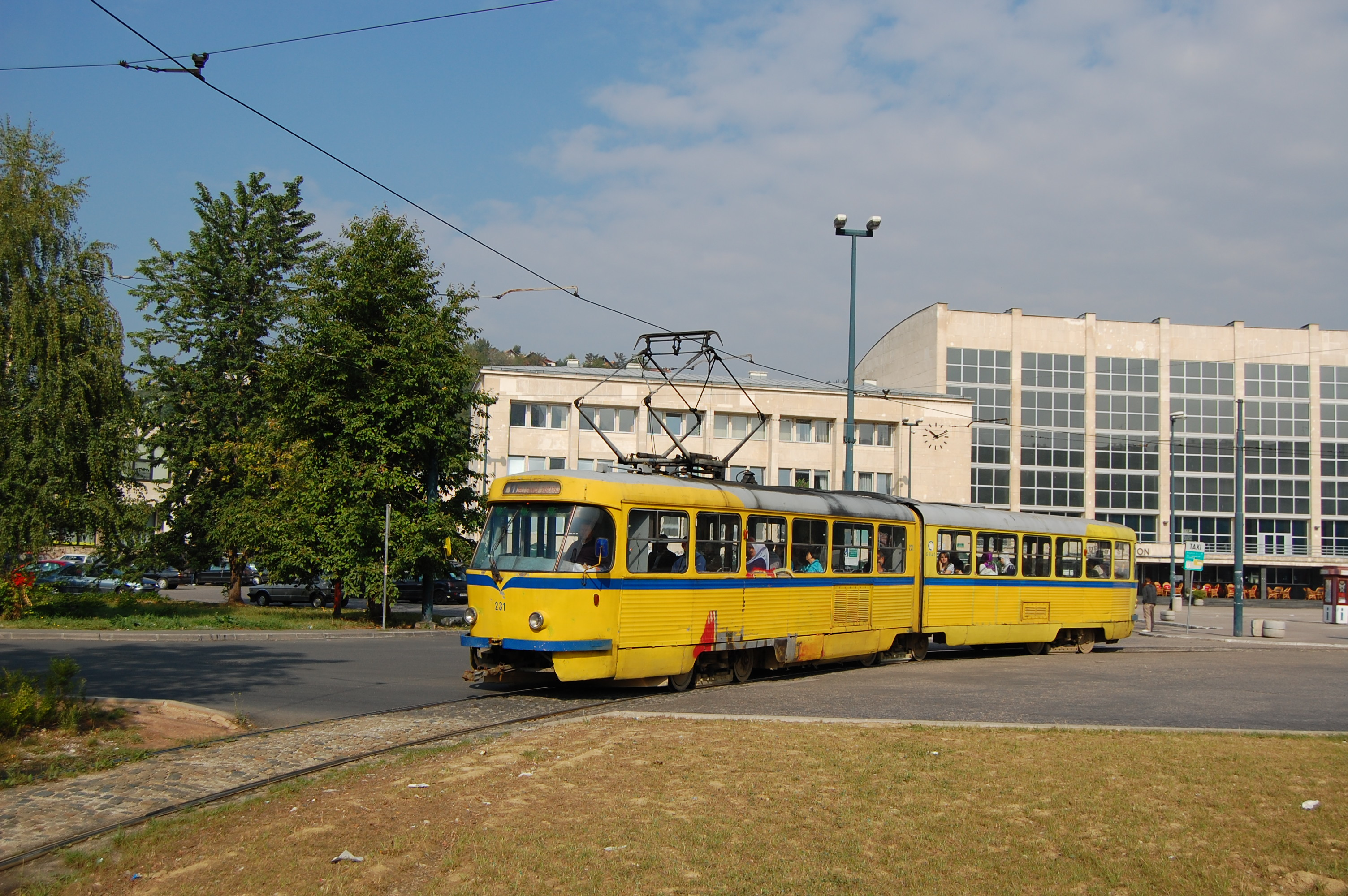
Czechoslovak Tatra K2 tram

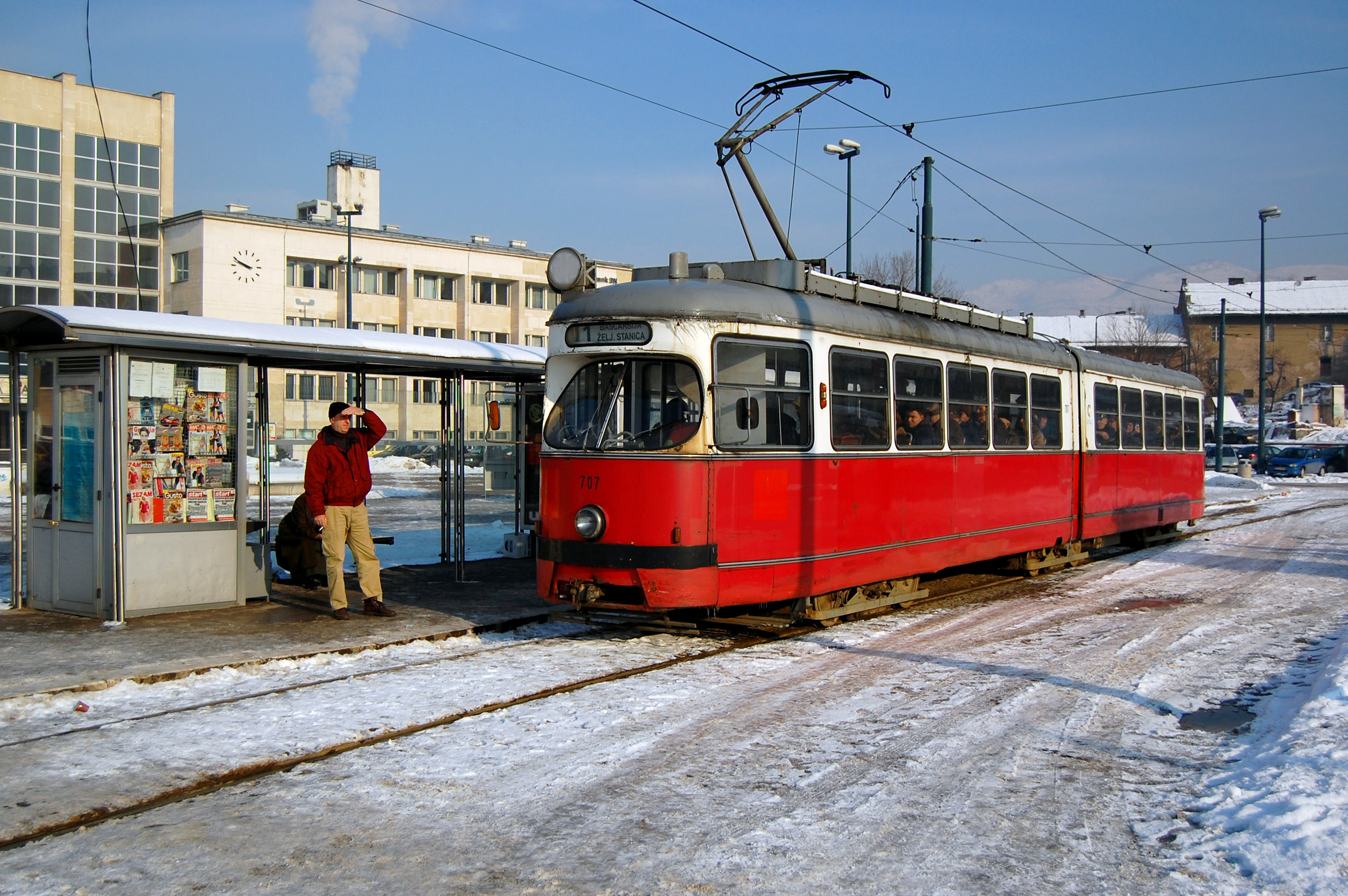
Vienna tram type E
