= Mount Hum (Mostar) =

Mountain in Mostar, Bosnia and Herzegovina

Hum
- Location within Bosnia and Herzegovina

Highest point
- Elevation: 436 m (1,430 ft)
- Coordinates: 43°19′38″N 17°48′23″E

Geography
- Location: Bosnia and Herzegovina
- Parent range: Dinaric Alps

Hum is a small mountain located south of Mostar, Bosnia and Herzegovina, on the left bank of the Neretva river. The 436-meter high mountain is part of the Čvrsnica region of the Dinaric Alps.

In 2002, the "Millennium Cross" was erected on top of the hill. The cross, measuring 33 metres, is meant to celebrate two millennia of Christianity, making it a controversial landmark due to Mostar being populated by both Christians and Muslims.
