= Narrow-gauge railways in Hungary =

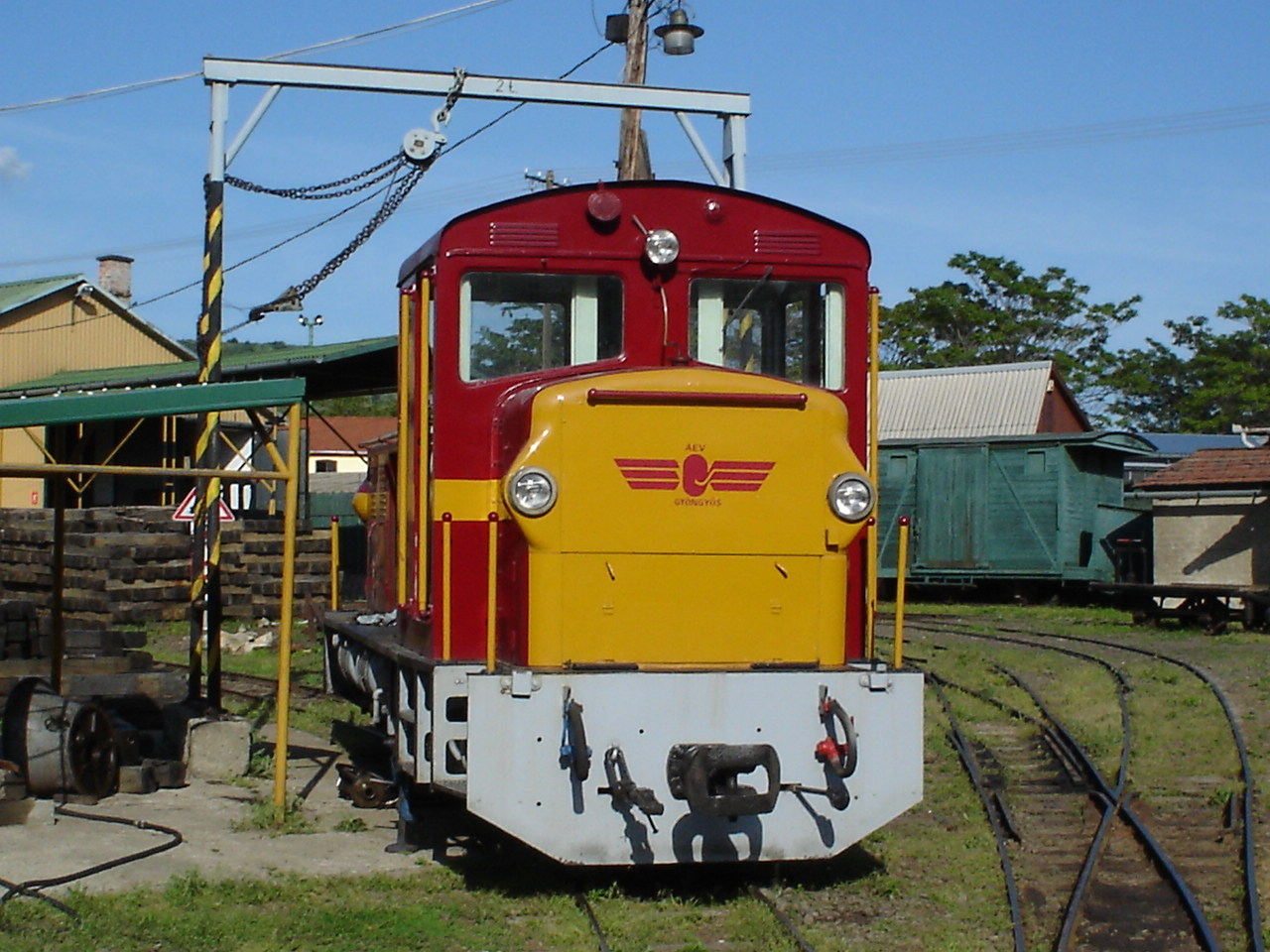
Forest railway depot in Gyöngyös

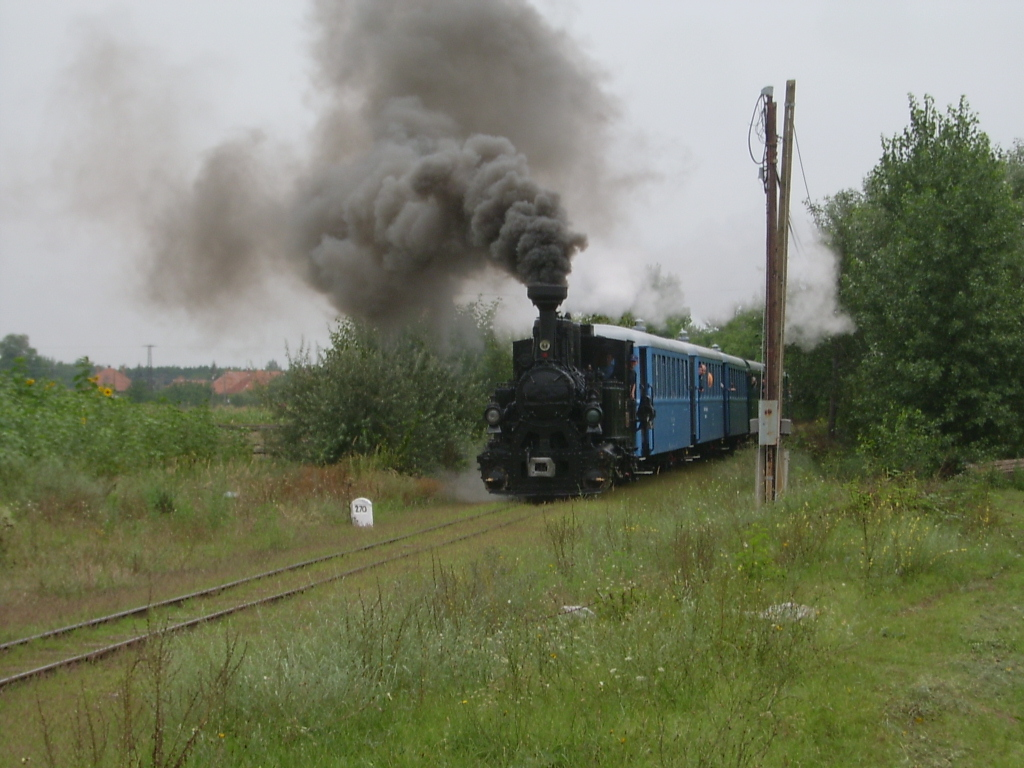
Kecskemét Light Railway

The former Austria-Hungary empire had a narrow-gauge rail network thousands of kilometres in length, most of it using Bosnian gauge 760 mm (2 ft 5 15/16 in) or 600 mm (1 ft 11 5/8 in) gauge, constructed between 1870 and 1920. Landlords, mines, agricultural and forest estates established their own branch lines which, as they united into regional networks, increasingly played a role in regional passenger traffic. Following the Treaty of Trianon some railways were cut by the new border, many remained on the territory of Romania, Czechoslovakia and Yugoslavia. Due to a lack of intact roads, following World War II in many places narrow-gauge railway was the only reasonable way to get around. In 1968 the Communist government started to implement a policy to dismantle the narrow-gauge network in favour of road traffic. Freight haulage on the few remaining lines continued to decline until 1990 from when a patchwork of railways was gradually taken over by associations and forest managements for tourist purposes. State Railways operated narrow-gauge railways at Nyíregyháza and Kecskemét that played a role in regional transport until December 2009.

Most railways have a track gauge of 760 mm (2 ft 5 15/16 in), unless otherwise specified.

== Field railways ==
- Balatonfenyves narrow-gauge railway, active in 2 lines
- Fishery Railway Hortobágy, closed since 2021
- Kecskemét Light Railway, only with draisine
- Nyírvidék Light Railway, closed in 2009
- Fishery Railway Szeged, active fishery railway
- Hemp Factory Railway Szegvár, closed in 2012
- Fishery Railway Tömörkény, closed in 2021

== Forest railways ==
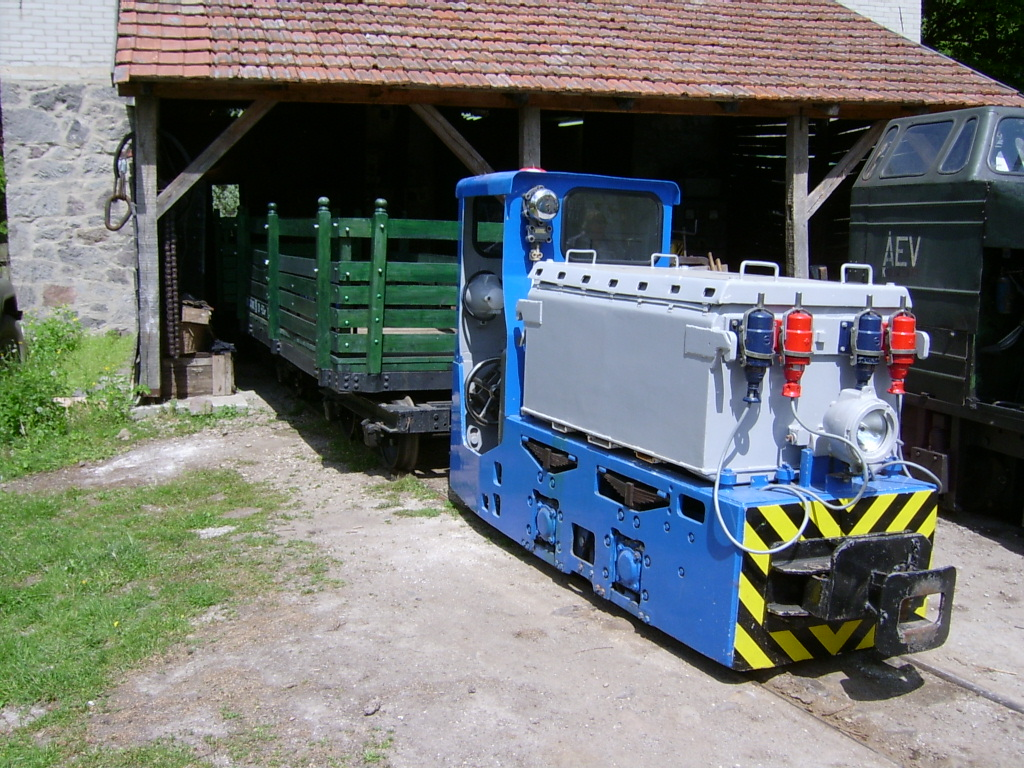
Kemence Forest Museum Railway

- Almamellék State Forest Railway, 600 mm (1 ft 11 5/8 in) narrow gauge
- Csömödér State Forest Railway, active forest railway
- Debrecen Forest Railway
- Felsőtárkány National Forest Railway
- Gemenc State Forest Railway, active forest railway
- Gödöllő Forest Railway, closed in 2023
- Gyöngyös State Forest Railway, active in 2 lines
- Kaszó Forest Railway
- Kemence Forest Museum Railway, 600 mm (1 ft 11 5/8 in) narrow gauge
- Királyrét State Forest Railway
- Lillafüred Forest Train
- Mesztegnyő Forest Railway, closed since 2023
- Pálháza State Forest Railway
- Szilvásvárad Forest Railway
- Szob-Nagybörzsöny forest railway

== Children's railways ==
- Budapest Children's Railway
- Mecseki narrow gauge railway
- Széchenyi Railway Museum
- Tiszakécske Children's Railway

== Heritage railway ==
- Vál Valley Light Railway
