= C-50 (narrow-gauge locomotive) =

Hungarian narrow-gauge diesel locomotive series (1952–1968)

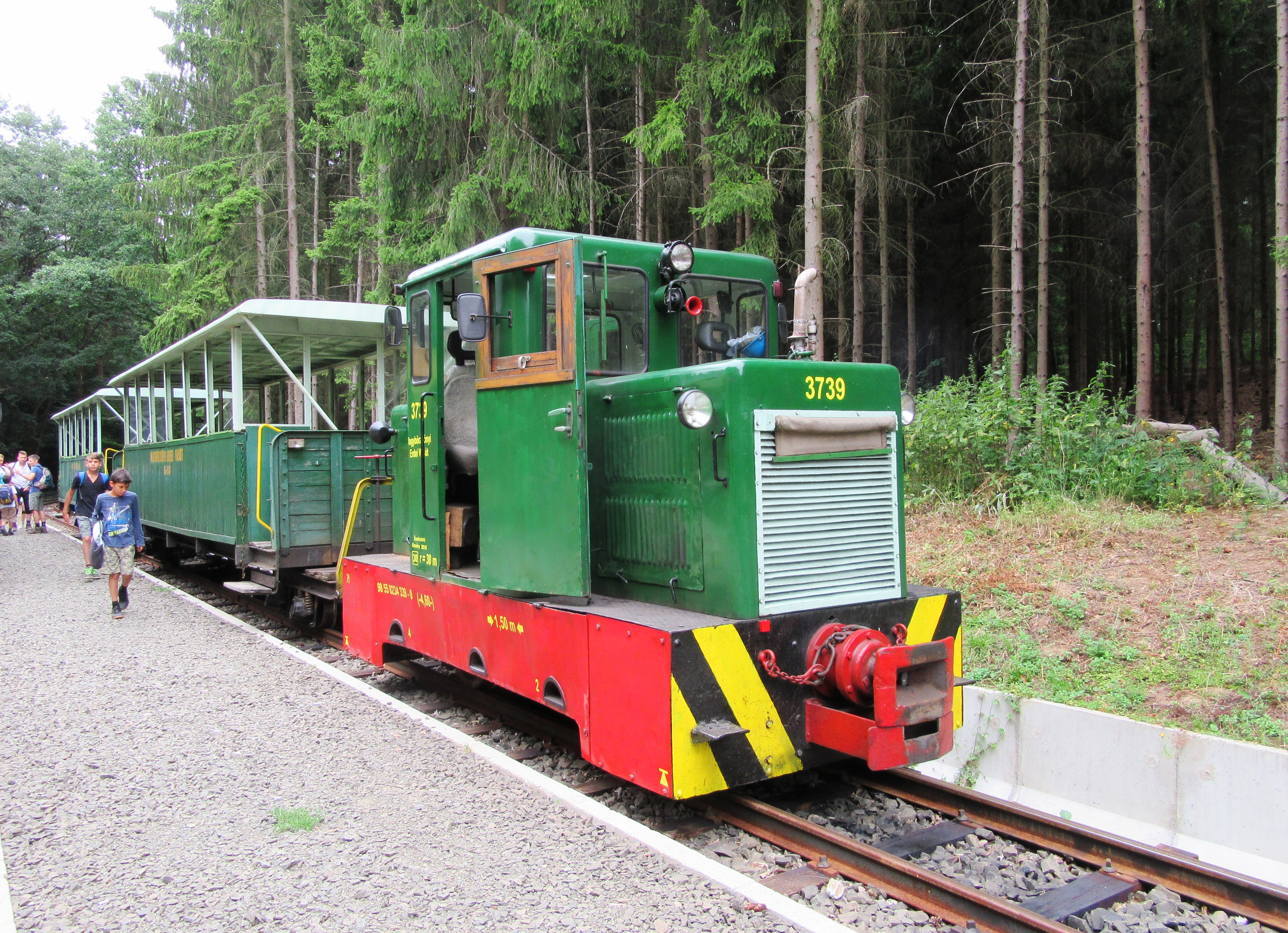
Type and origin
- Power type: diesel
- Builder: Northern Repair Works
- Build date: 1952–1968
- Total produced: 280
Specifications
- Configuration
  - UIC: B
- Gauge: 760 mm (2 ft 5 15/16 in)
- Wheel diameter: 600 mm (1 ft 11 5/8 in)
- Minimum curve: 40 m (130 ft)
- Wheelbase: 1,500 mm (4 ft 11 in)
- Length
  - Over couplers: 4,600 mm (15 ft 1 in)
- Width: 1,850 mm (6 ft 1 in)
- Height: 2,600 mm (8 ft 6 in)
- Loco weight: Total: 7 t (6.9 long tons; 7.7 short tons); Empty: 44.5 t (44 long tons; 49 short tons)
- Fuel capacity: 80 L (18 imp gal; 21 US gal)
- Prime mover: Csepel W 413; Diesel engine
- Cylinders: 2
- Transmission: Diesel mechanical
Performance figures
- Maximum speed: 30 km/h (19 mph)
- Power output: Engines: 85 hp (63 kW)
Career
- Operators: Hungarian State Railways (formerly)

The C-50 is a Hungarian series of diesel locomotives for narrow-gauge railways produced in large numbers between 1952 and 1968.

Production of the series began in 1952 at the Northern Repair Works of Magyar Államvasutak (MÁV) in Budapest. For the propulsion, lorry components from the truck and van manufacturer Csepel were used. The locomotives were initially produced mainly for the commercial railways of MÁV with a track gauge of 760 mm (2 ft 5 15/16 in), but later they were also produced in large numbers for industrial and forest railways with a track gauge of 600 mm (1 ft 11 5/8 in) and 1,000 mm (3 ft 3 3/8 in). 20 locomotives were exported to North Korea. With the closure of many narrow-gauge railways in the 1960s, the number of locomotives of the series were scrapped, but they are still in use today on mainly tourist-operated forest railways and former pioneer railways, including Budapest Children's Railway, Szob-Nagybörzsöny forest railway, Balatonfenyves narrow-gauge railway or the Fishery Railway of Hortobágy.

The frame is made of rolled steel sections with a box at each corner to accommodate additional weights, giving the locomotives a low centre of gravity that helps running on poorly laid track and allowing the axle load to be changed. The standard centre buffer coupling is spring-mounted at the fronts and can be adjusted in height. The locomotive body with the small stems is made of sheet-metal plated steel frames. Depending on the series, the running gear is fitted with an inner frame (series 3700) or outer frame (series 5700) and has a leaf spring suspension.

It was originally powered by a Csepel W 413 four-cylinder, four-stroke, pre-chamber in-line diesel engine (a licensed version of the Steyr WD 413), which could be started either by an electric starter or by a crank. Power is transmitted to both wheelsets via a conventional 5-speed Csepel lorry gearbox (with foot clutch and gear lever) and a two-stage change and reversing gearbox.

== Gallery ==
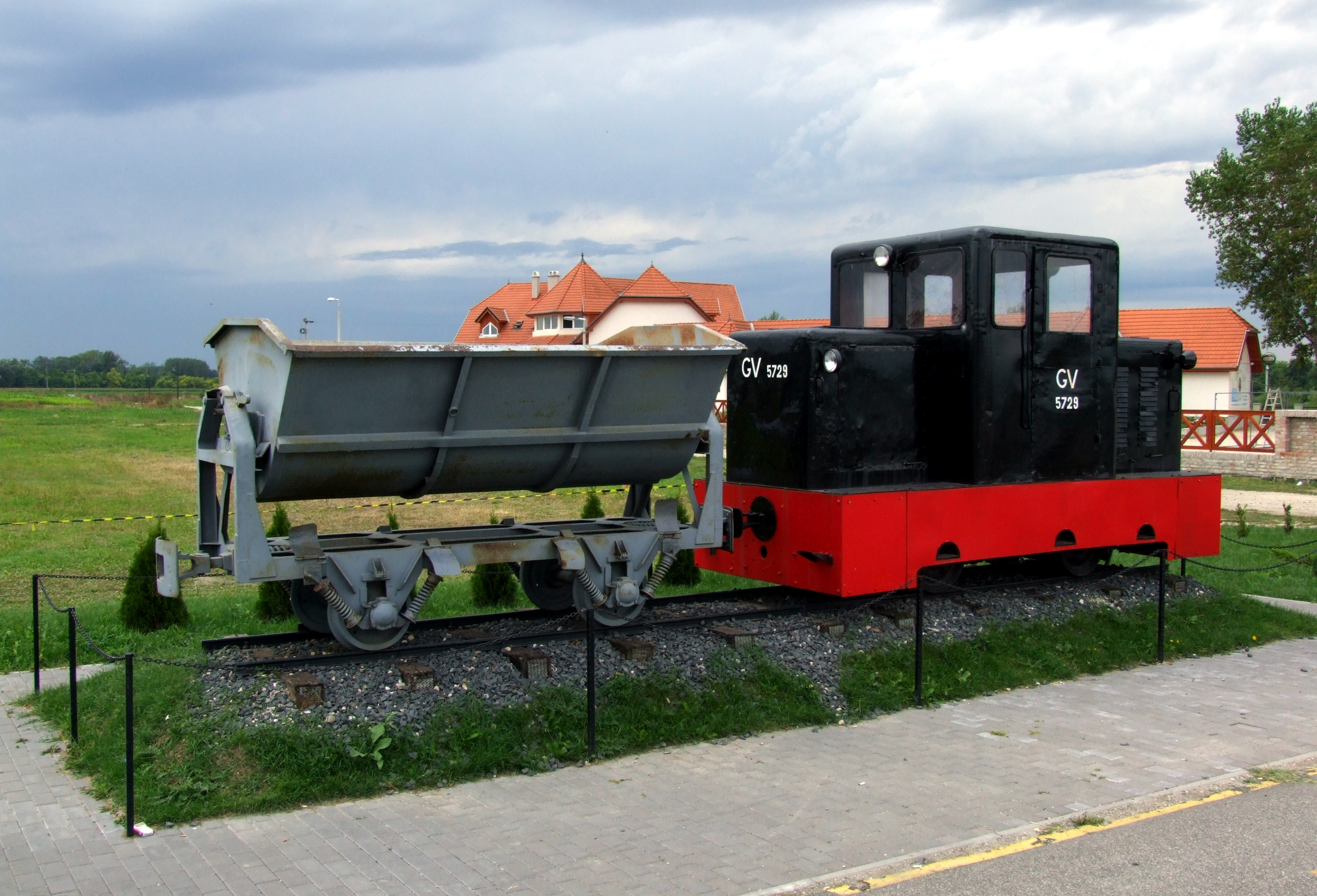
Retired C-50 on display in Dunaszeg

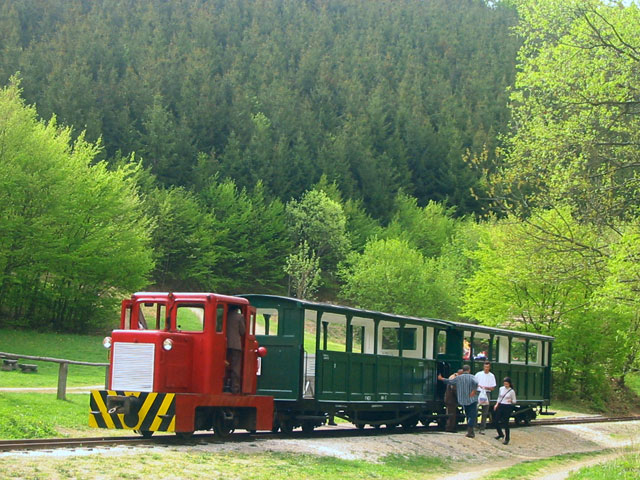
C-50 on the Felsőtárkány National Forest Railway

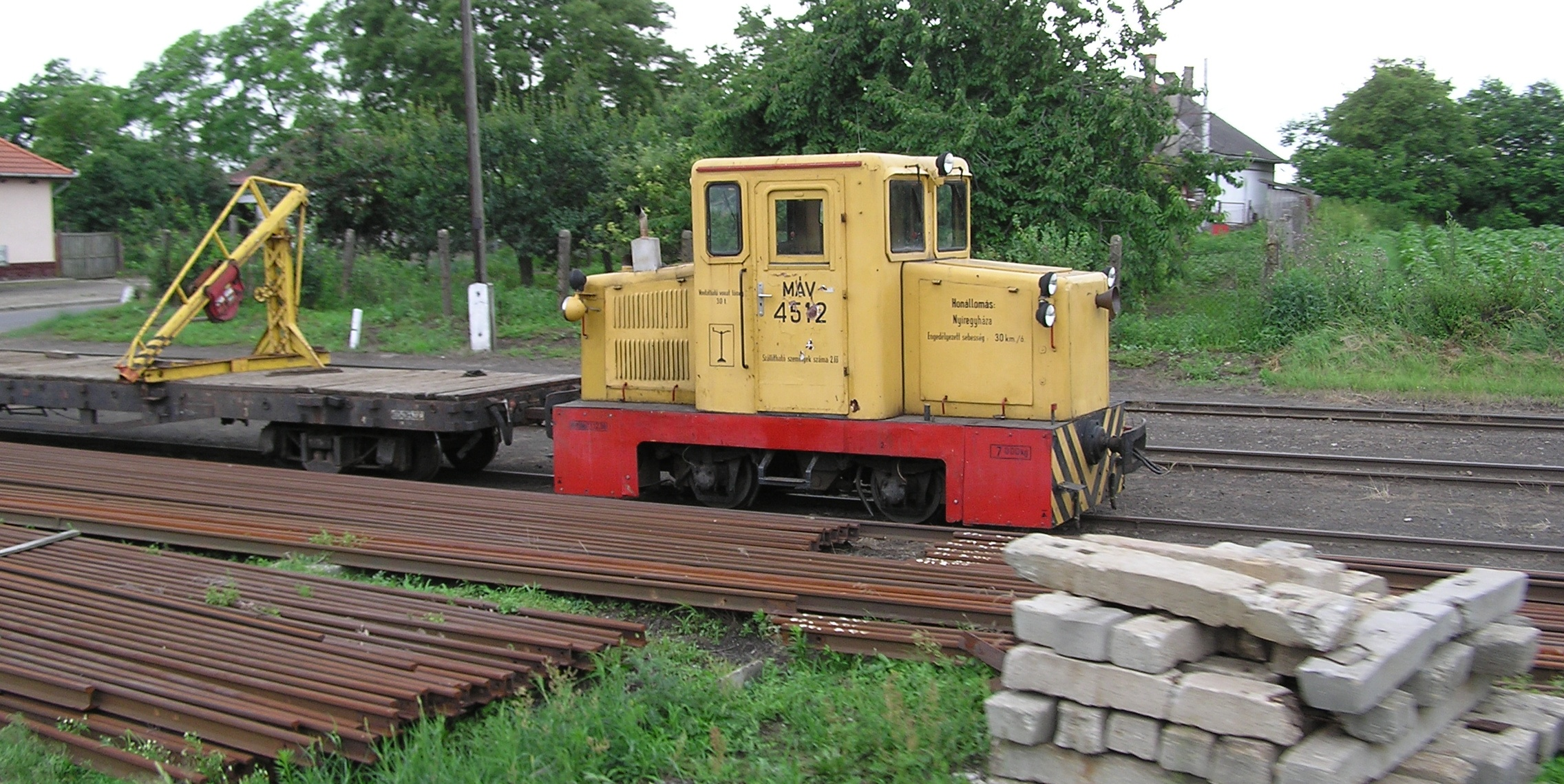
C-50 used for maintenance works on the now defunct Nyírvidék Narrow-gauge Railway

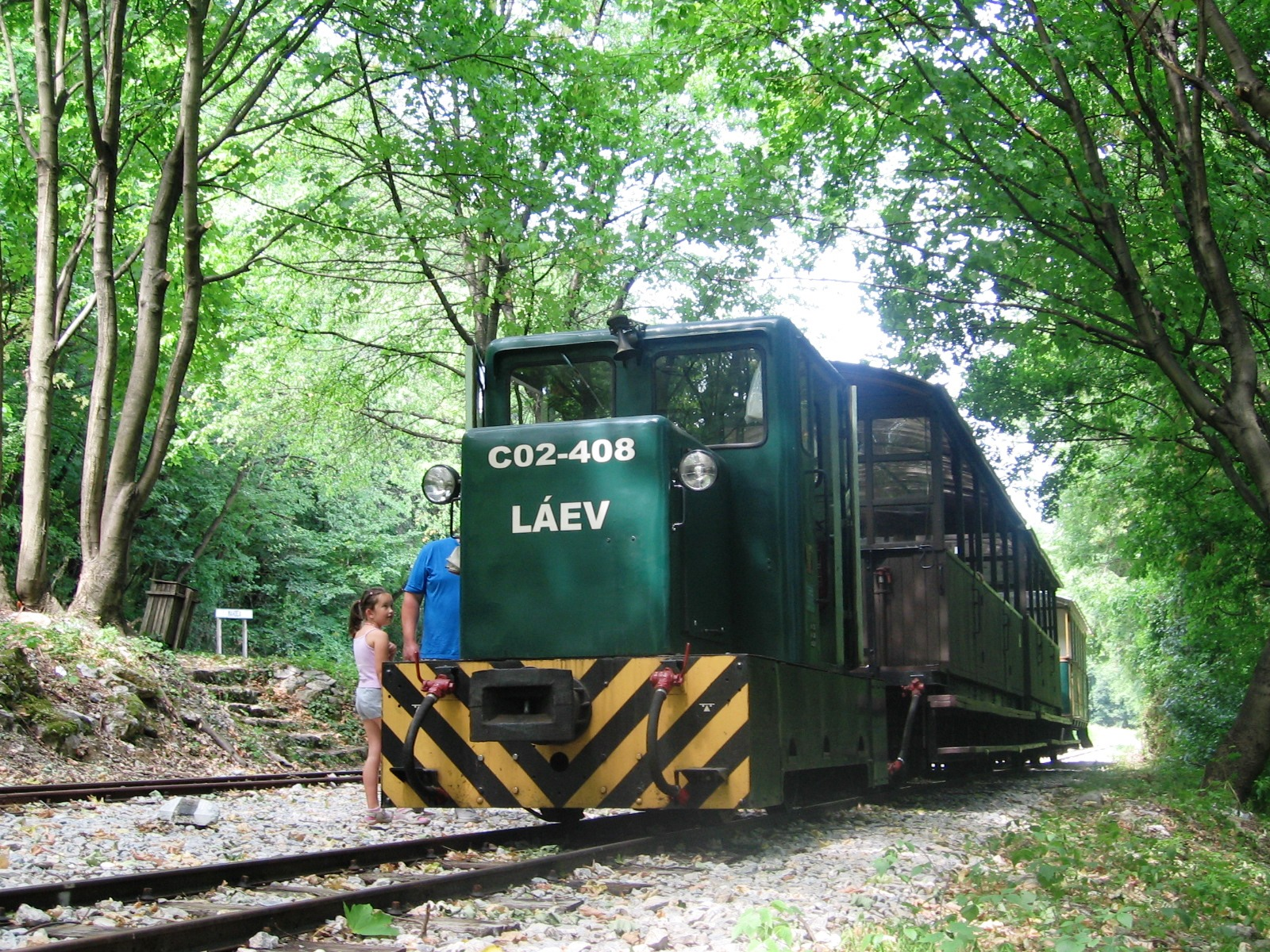
C-50 on the Lillafüred Forest Train

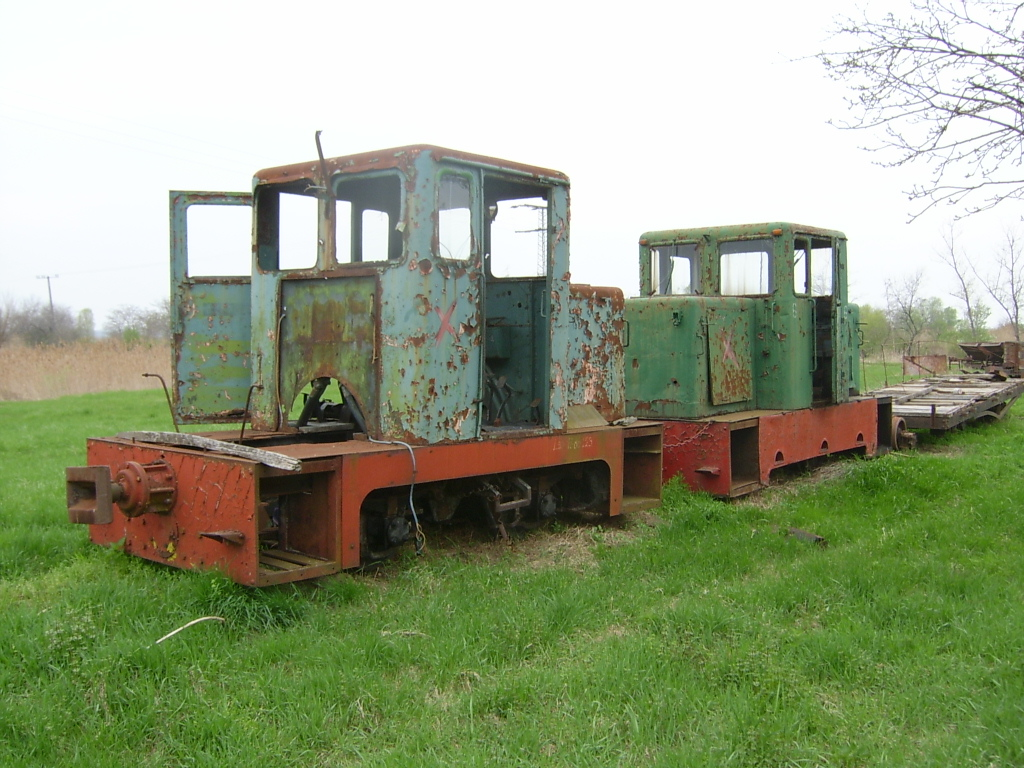
Two C-50s awaiting for scrapping in Csanytelek
