= C50 =

C50 may refer to:

== Vehicles ==
Aircraft

- Beechcraft C-50 Twin Bonanza, an American civil utility aircraft
- Douglas C-50, an American military transport

Ships

- ARM General Miguel Negrete (C50), an Admirable-class minesweeper of the Mexican Navy

Surface vehicles

- Courage C50, a French racing car
- Chevrolet C-50, an American medium-duty truck
- Great Wall Voleex C50, a Chinese compact car
- Honda C50, a Japanese motorcycle introduced in 1966
- JNR Class C50, a Japanese steam locomotive type
- Suzuki Boulevard C50, a Japanese motorcycle introduced in 2005
- C50, an Italian bicycle produced by Colnago
- Series C-50, a model of the Chrysler Imperial car
- C-50, a Hungarian narrow-gauge diesel locomotive type

== Other uses ==
- Breast cancer
- Caldwell 50, an open cluster
- Giuoco Piano, a chess opening
- Recruiting of Indigenous Workers Convention, 1936 (shelved) of the International Labour Organization
- C-50, an AMD processor implementing the Bobcat microarchitecture
- C50, a Wordtank Japanese language electronic dictionary
