= Mecseki narrow gauge railway =

Railway line in Hungary

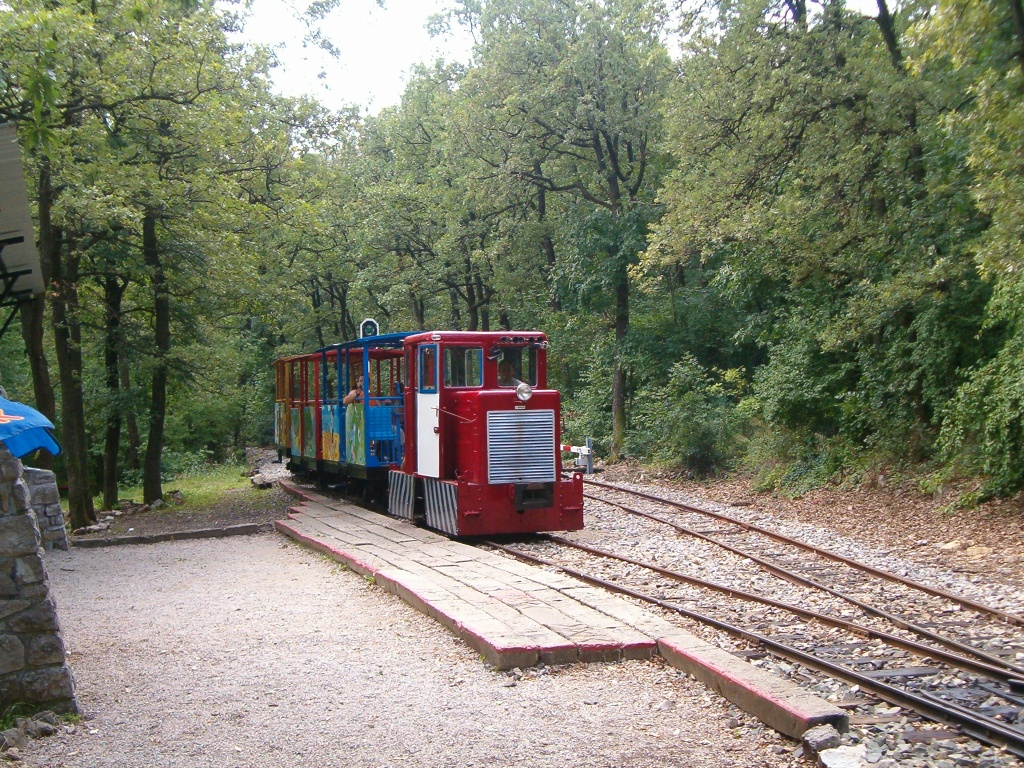

Overview
- Native name: Mecseki kisvasút
- Locale: Hungary
- Coordinates: 46.099°N 18.231°E
- Termini: Pécs Zoo (Állatkert); Dömörkapu
- Stations: 2

Technical
- Line length: 570 m (1,870 ft)
- Track gauge: 760 mm (2 ft 5 15/16 in) Bosnian gauge

The Mecseki narrow gauge railway (Hungarian: Mecseki kisvasút) is a 760 mm (2 ft 5 15/16 in) railway in Pécs, Hungary.

== Motive Power ==
The only operational locomotive is a C50 diesel locomotive.

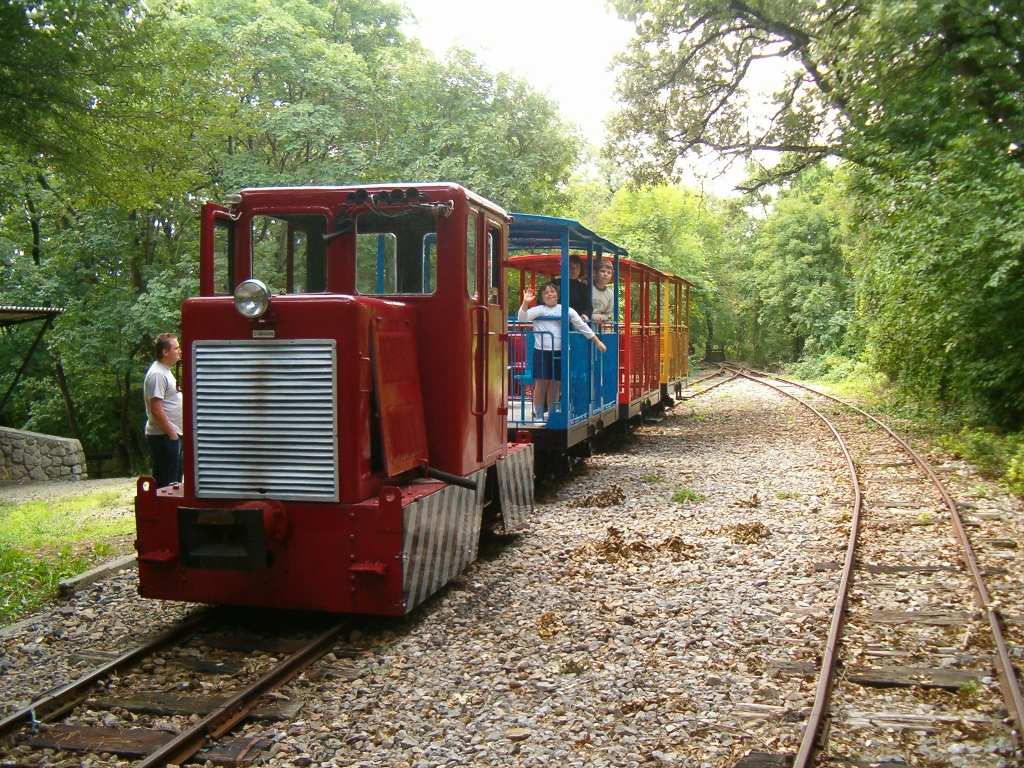
C-504509
