= Val Gardena Railway =

Former railway in northern Italy

Coordinates: 46.5753°N 11.6683°E

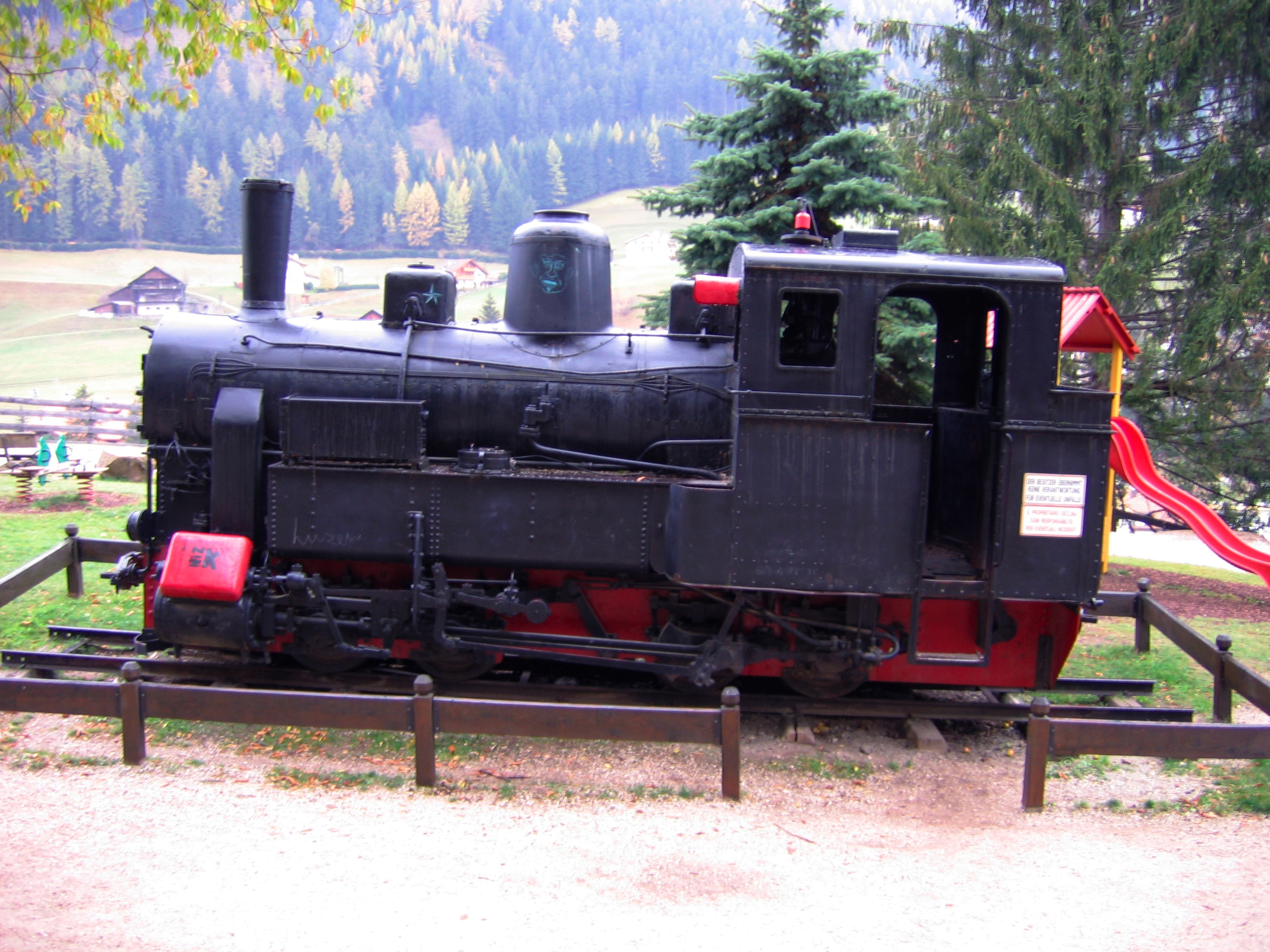
One of the locomotives preserved in a local park.

The Val Gardena Railway or Klausen-Plan (Italian: Ferrovia della Val Gardena, German: Grödner Bahn, Ladin: Ferata de Gherdëina) was a 760 mm (2 ft 5 15/16 in) narrow gauge railway operating in the Val Gardena in the Dolomites of northern Italy. It was constructed in 1915/6 when the region was part of the Austrian Empire. Construction was remarkably rapid: begun in September 1915, the line was completed and opened on 6 February 1916. This feat was accomplished by the conscripted labour of some 6,000 Russian prisoners of war. The railway was 32.5 kilometres (20.2 mi) long, ran between Chiusa (Klausen) and Plan, and had the distinction of being the highest line operated by FS with a summit (at Plan) of 1,595 metres (5,233 ft) above sea level. It closed on 28 May 1960. A 3.5 km (2.2 mi) long section between Santa Cristina Val Gardena and Ortisei is now a public footpath, the Val Gardena Railway Trail.

Locomotive no. R 410.004 (FS numbering) is preserved adjacent to the Railway Trail at Ortisei. It is an outside cylinder 0-8-0 well tank with outside frames which was built in 1916 by Krauss of Linz (works number 7174) as no. 4154 Class IVc for the KUK Heeresbahn (Austro-Hungarian Military Railways). It was one of seven similar locomotives which worked on the line.

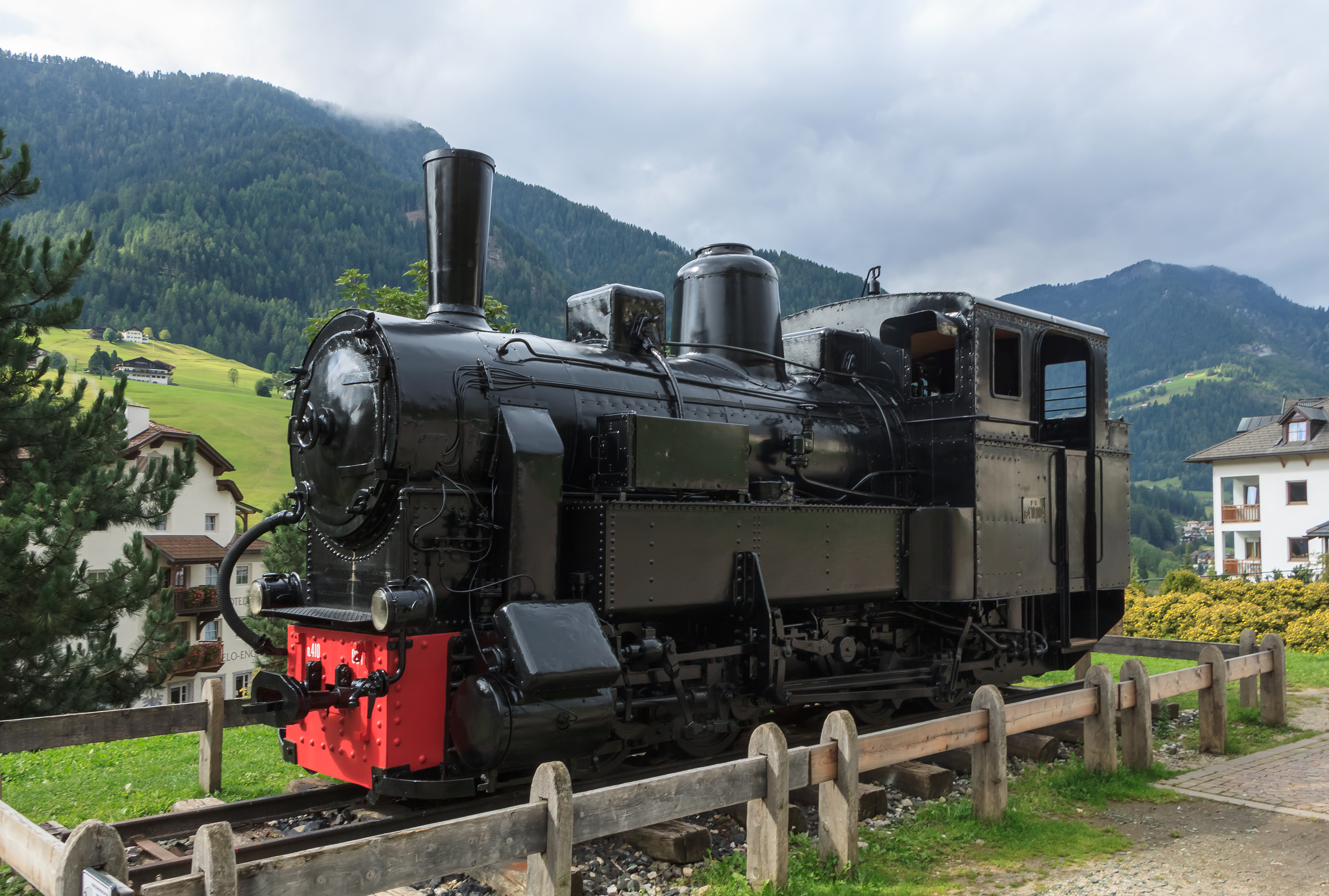
Locomotive FS R.410.004 of the Val Gardena Railway, restored and with new livery

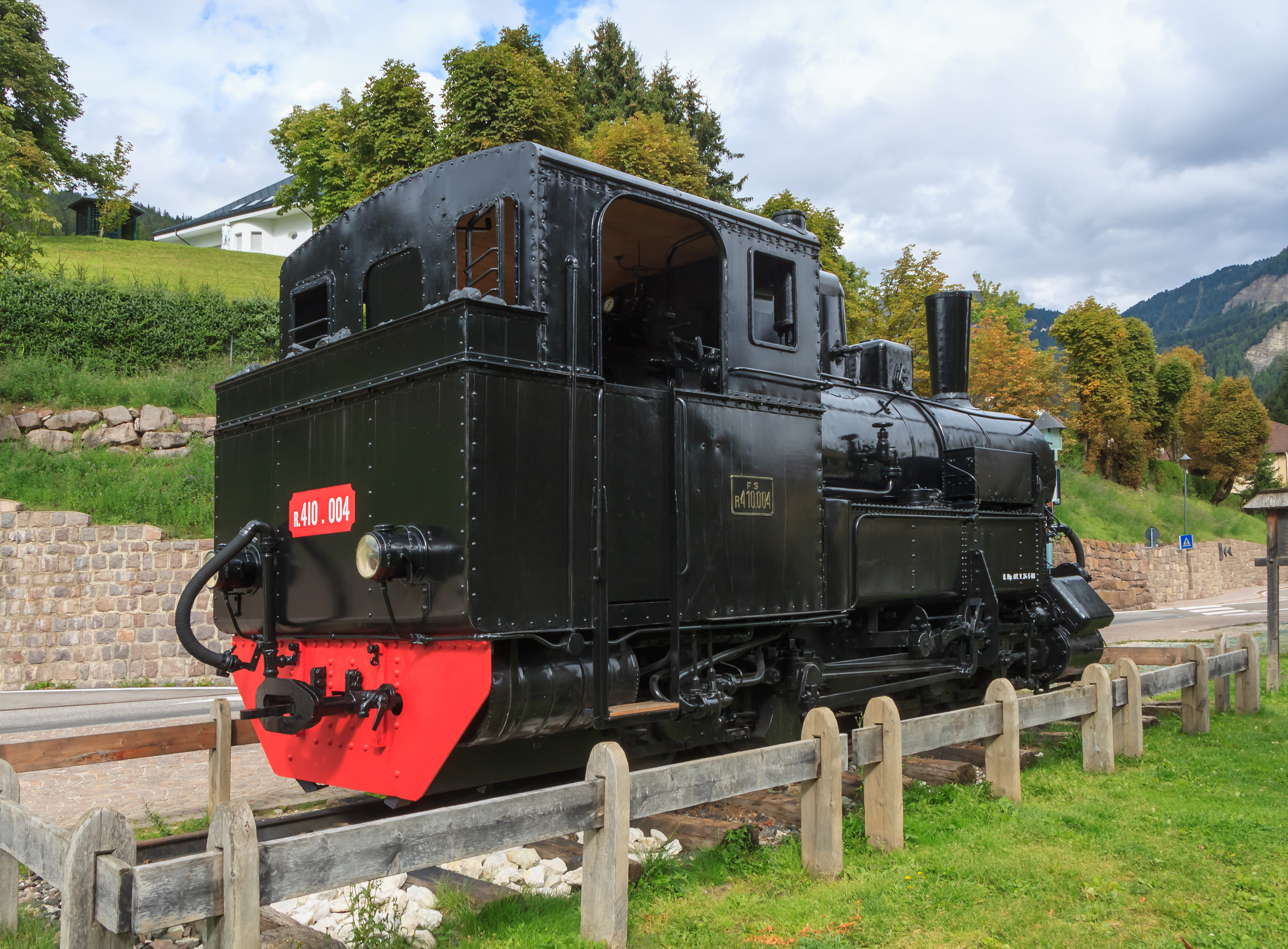
Locomotive FS R.410.004 of the Val Gardena Railway, restored and with new livery

== See also ==
- Klausen station
