= Samoborček =

Historic narrow-gauge railway in Croatia

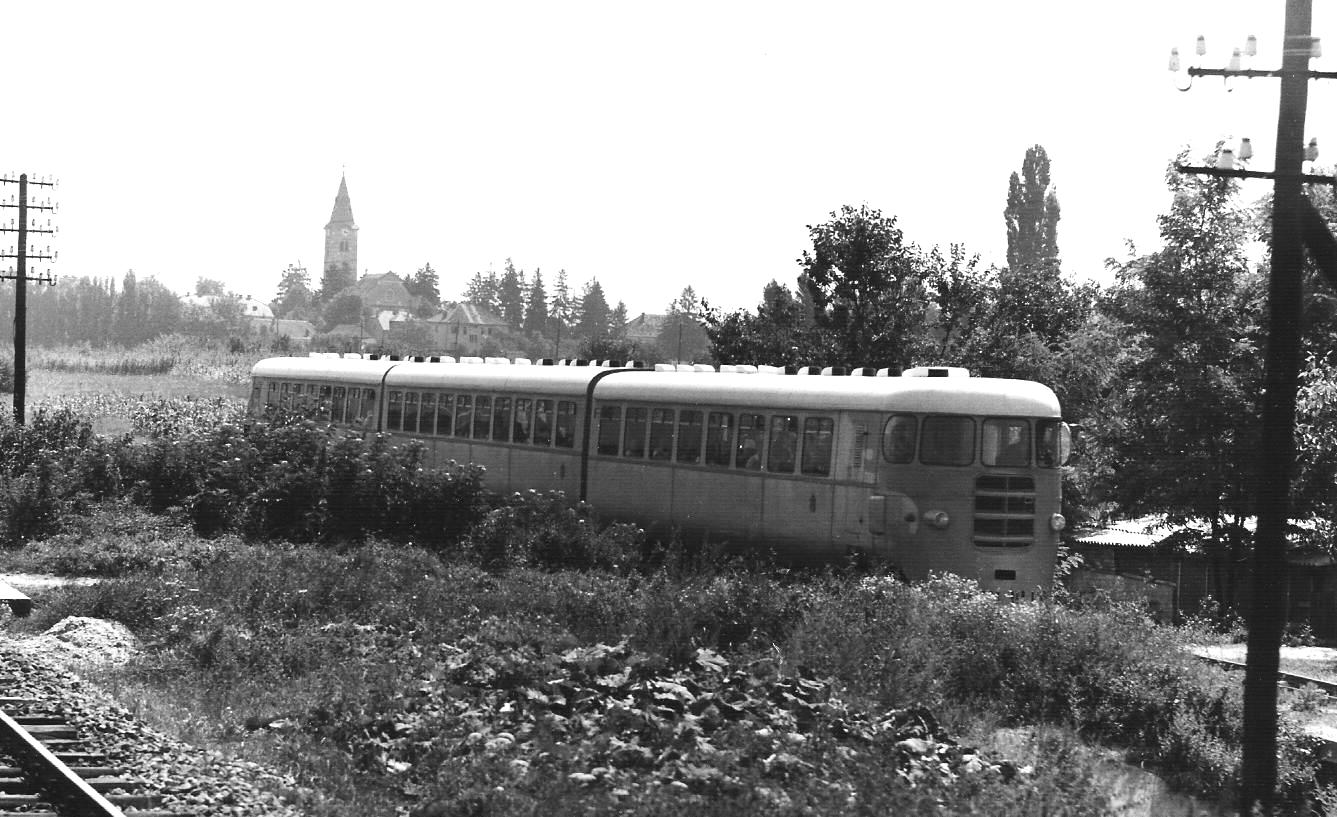
- A Samoborček Silver Arrow train in motion (pictured in 1970)

Overview
- Headquarters: Zagreb, Croatia
- Locale: Croatia, Slovenia
- Dates of operation: January 14, 1901–December 31, 1979

Technical
- Track gauge: 760 mm (2 ft 5 15/16 in)

Samoborček is the name given to a historic Croatian narrow-gauge railway linking Zagreb with Samobor onwards to Bregana, which operated from 1901 through 1979.

== History ==
Initially, Samoborček was projected as cargo train, to connect the factories and companies in Samobor with the growing industry and market in Zagreb, because at the time, the only connection was a horse-drawn omnibus. The railway was a public company until the end of World War II, when it was nationalized by the new government and became Zagreb–Samobor City Railway (Croatian: Gradska željeznica Zagreb–Samobor). In coming years, the railway's share of traffic to Samobor dropped in favor of trucks and buses, and the railway was closed in 1979. All the infrastructure was abandoned and dismantled.

== Rail track ==
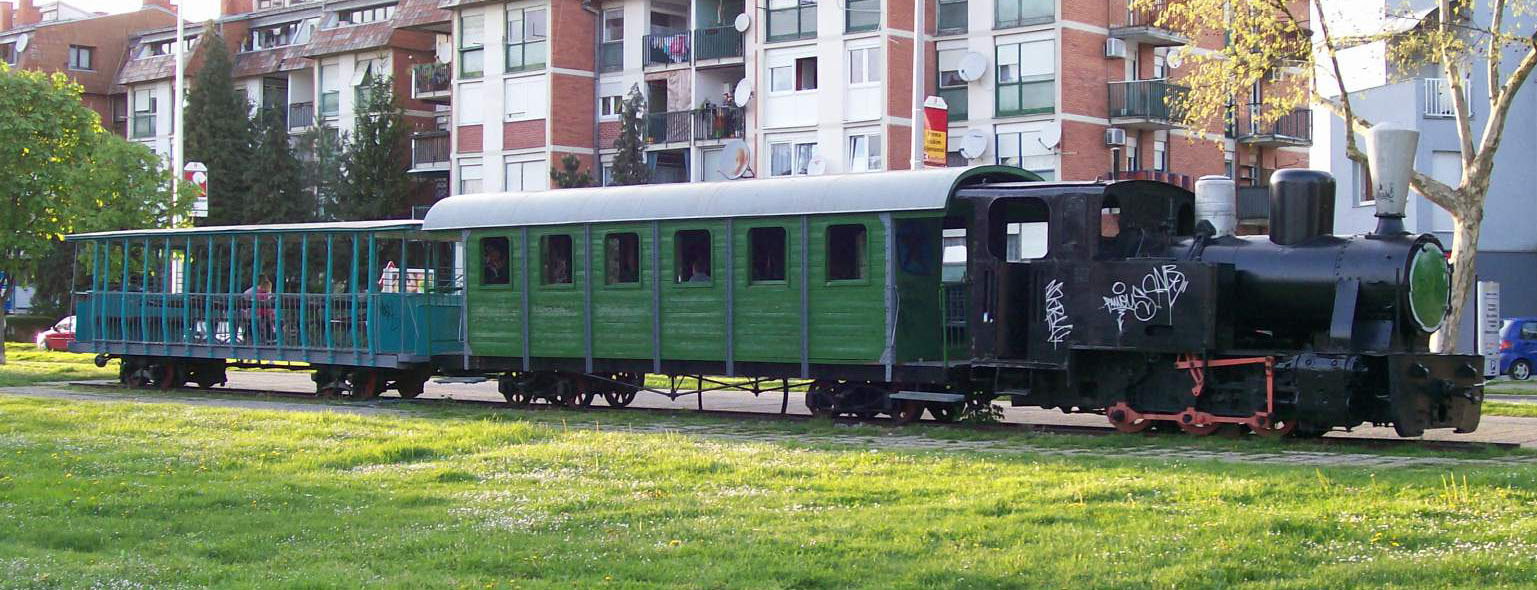
A former Samoborček locomotive, now a monument in Samobor.

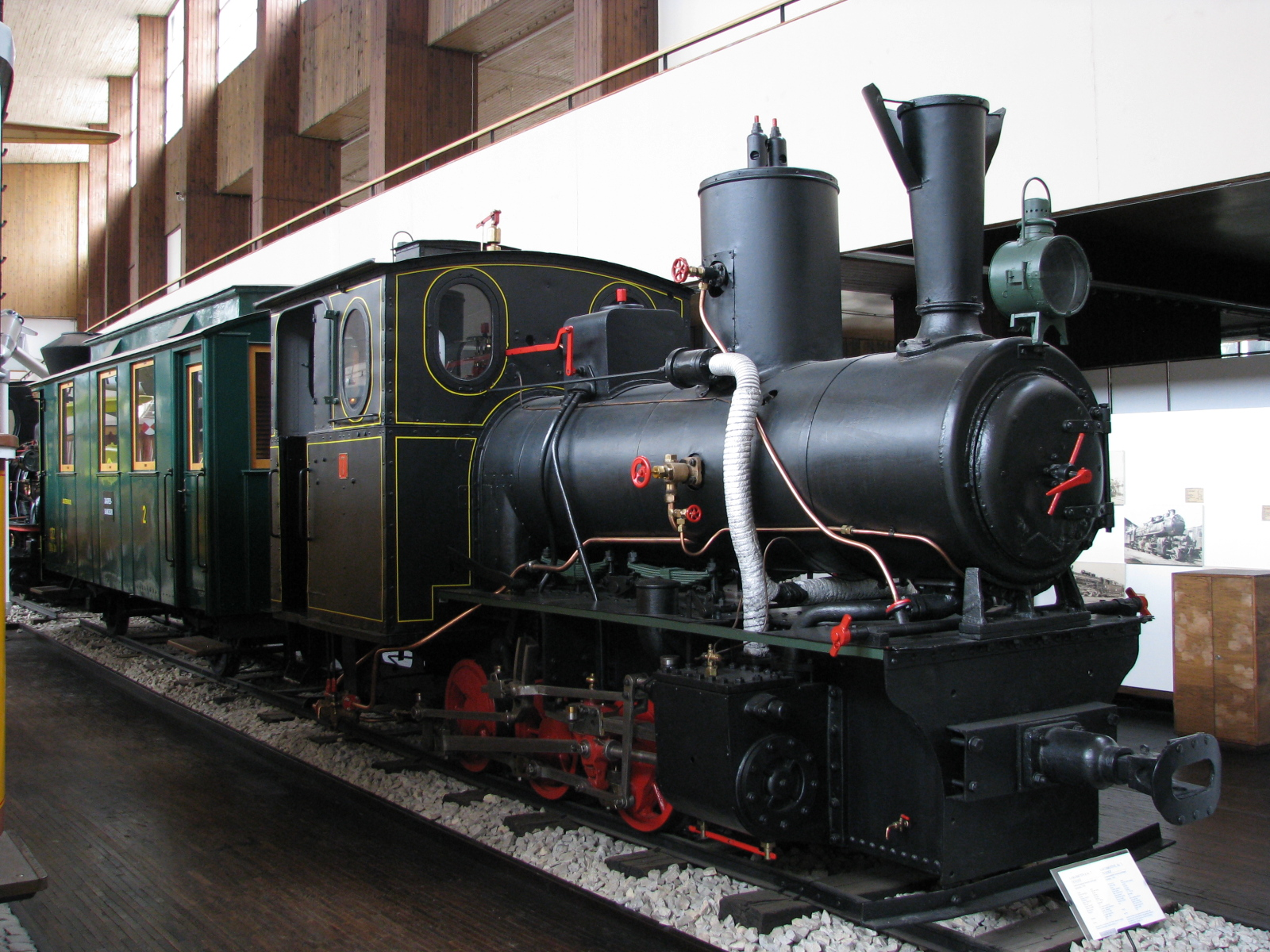
“Lokomotive Nr. 7” is in the Technical Museum Zagreb.

The Samoborček railway consisted of a single-tracked narrow-gauge line operating on the so-called Bosnian gauge at 760 mm (2 ft 5 15/16 in). Initially the line had a length of 19 kilometres (12 miles), from Zagreb to Samobor via Podsused; in the 1950s the track was extended to Bregana and military overhaul workshops today located on the territory of Slovenia.

Stations were:

- Zagreb S.K.
- Selska cesta
- Kustošija
- Vrapče
- Vrapče bolnica
- Stenjevec
- Stenjevec Gornji
- Goljak
- Susedgrad
- Bestovje
- Orešje
- Strmec
- Nedelja
- Domaslovec
- Samobor
- Samobor kupalište
- Lug
- Bregana stajalište
- Bregana tvornica

== Rolling stock ==
Until the 1950s, the rolling stock was composed of various steam engine driven compositions. Average speed was 15–20 km/h (9–12 mph). From the 1950s until the end of operation, DMU aluminium compositions, officially called "DEV" and nicknamed "Srebrna strijela" ("Silver Arrow") took over, with a maximum speed of 50 km/h (31 mph).

== Remains ==
Although all the tracks were removed, most of other railway infrastructure (embankments, bridges) survives today, but usually not in use. Most railway stations and embankments survived, and were converted into shops, restaurants and warehouses. A steam locomotive which operated the line is on permanent display in Samobor.

== Future development ==
A new railroad link between Zagreb and Samobor was first announced in 2004 and was due to be built from 2008 to 2012. The link was planned to be standard gauge and in accordance with normal Croatian Railways operations, with a maximum speed of 120 km/h (75 mph). The plan was that the new link starts at Podsused railway station where it would separate from the M101 railway corridor and continue towards Samobor. However, as of 2021 the construction of the new link has not yet begun, with numerous announcements of construction start and subsequent delays.
