= Península Valdés Railway =

Railway line in Argentina

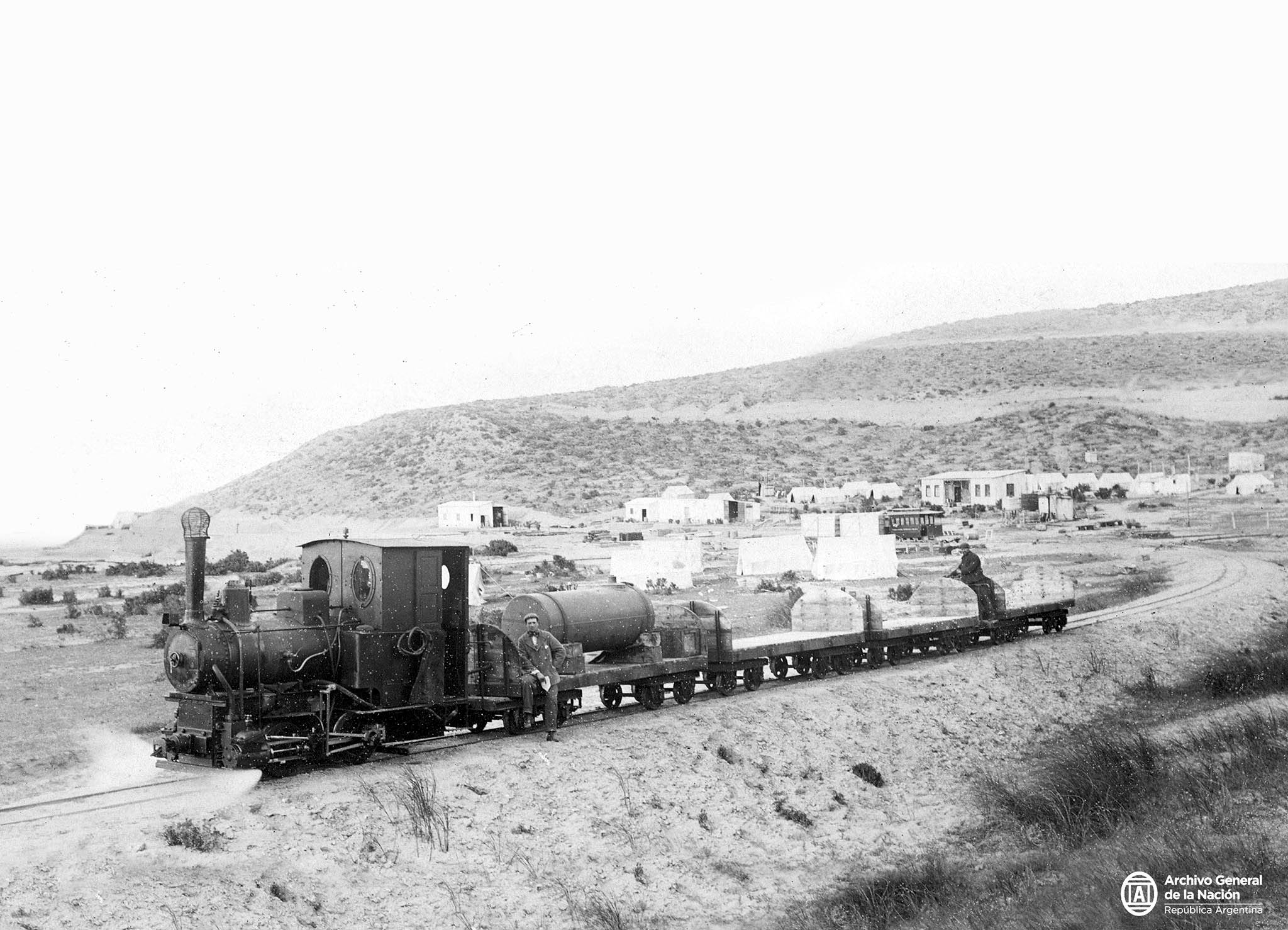
- A freight train leaving Puerto Pirámides.

Overview
- Native name: Ferrocarril de Península Valdés
- Status: Defunct company; rail line dismantled
- Owner: Ferro y Piaggio company
- Locale: Chubut
- Termini: Puerto Pirámides; Salinas Grandes
- Stations: 2

Service
- Type: Commuter rail

History
- Opened: 1901
- Closed: 1920; 106 years ago

Technical
- Line length: 32 km (20 mi)
- Track gauge: 760 mm (2 ft 5 15/16 in)
Route map
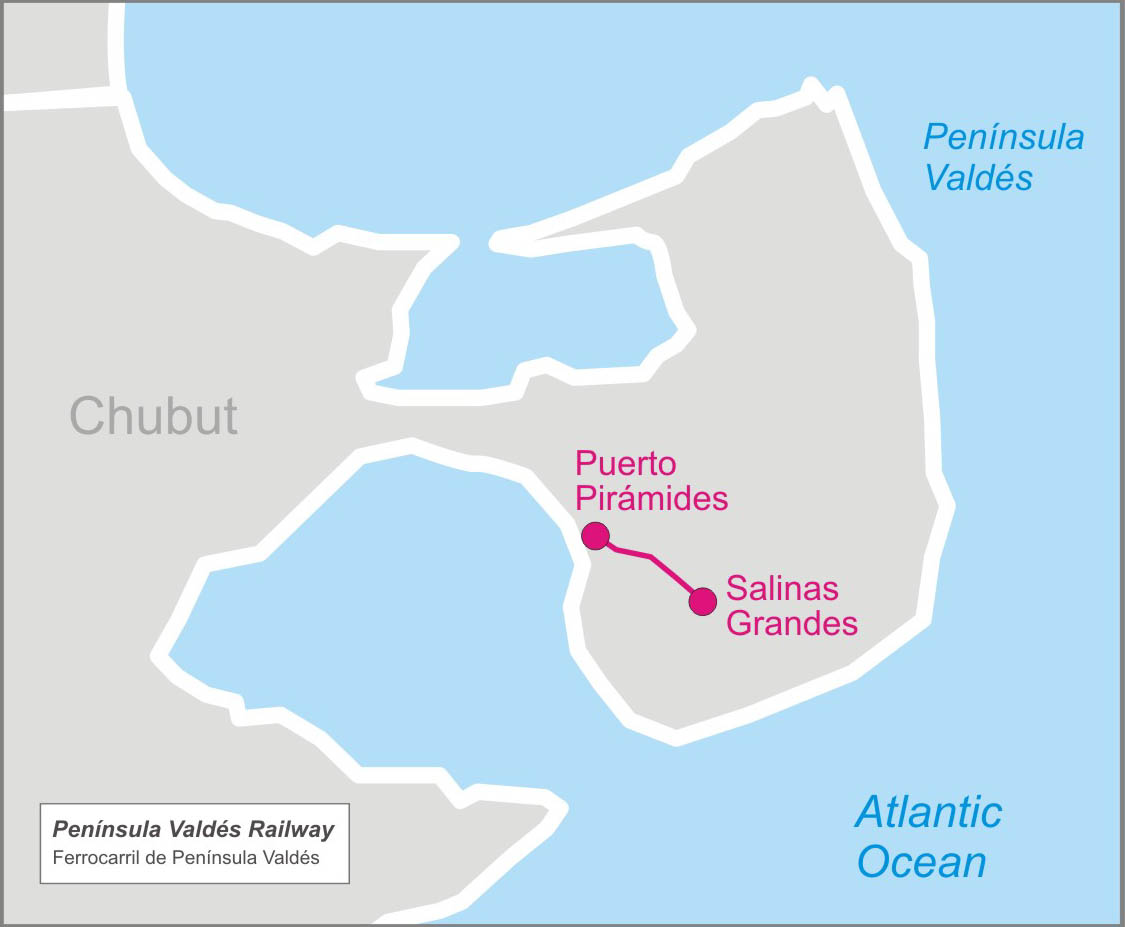

The Península Valdés Railway (in Spanish: Ferrocarril de Península Valdés) was an Argentine narrow gauge railway that joined the city of Puerto Pirámides with the salt evaporation pond known as Salinas Grandes, both in Chubut Province. The railway operated both passenger and freight services, with two intermediate stops.

The line (that served from 1901 to 1920) was owned by the salt production private company Ferro y Piaggio.

== History ==
=== Background ===
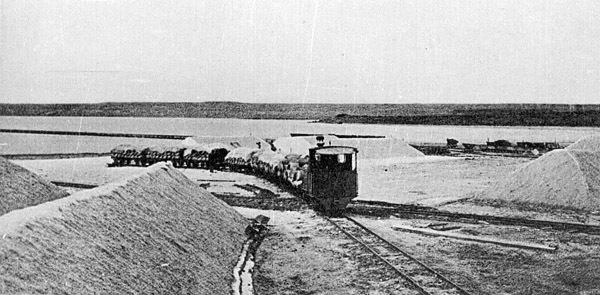
Salt train in Salinas Grandes station.

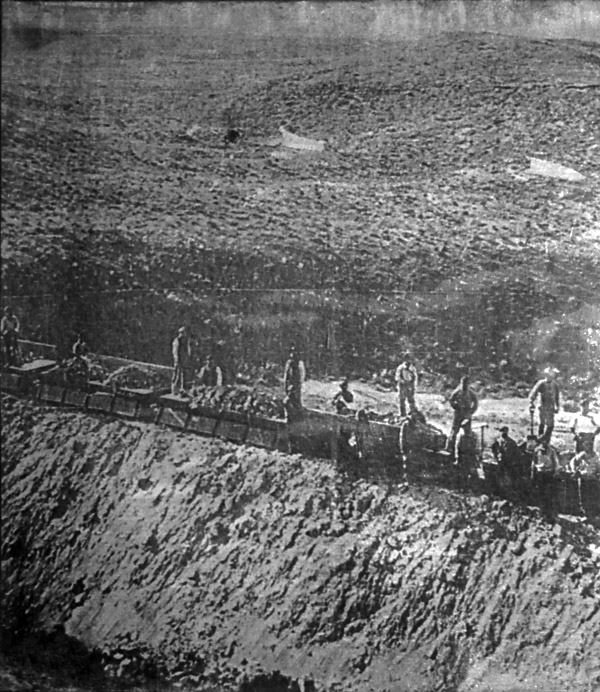
Loaded wagons and employees.

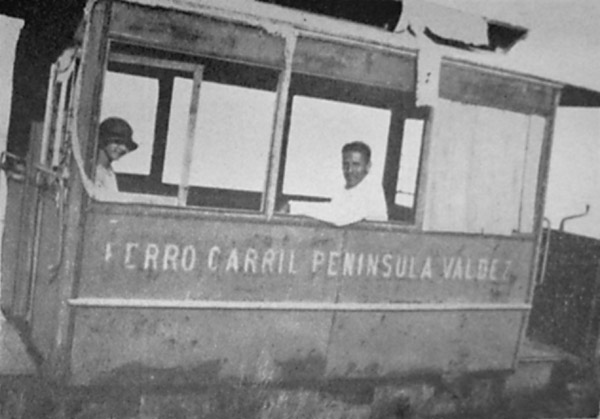
Passenger service.

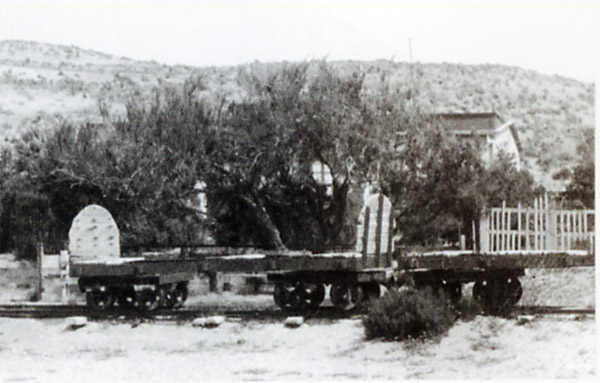
Flat wagon.

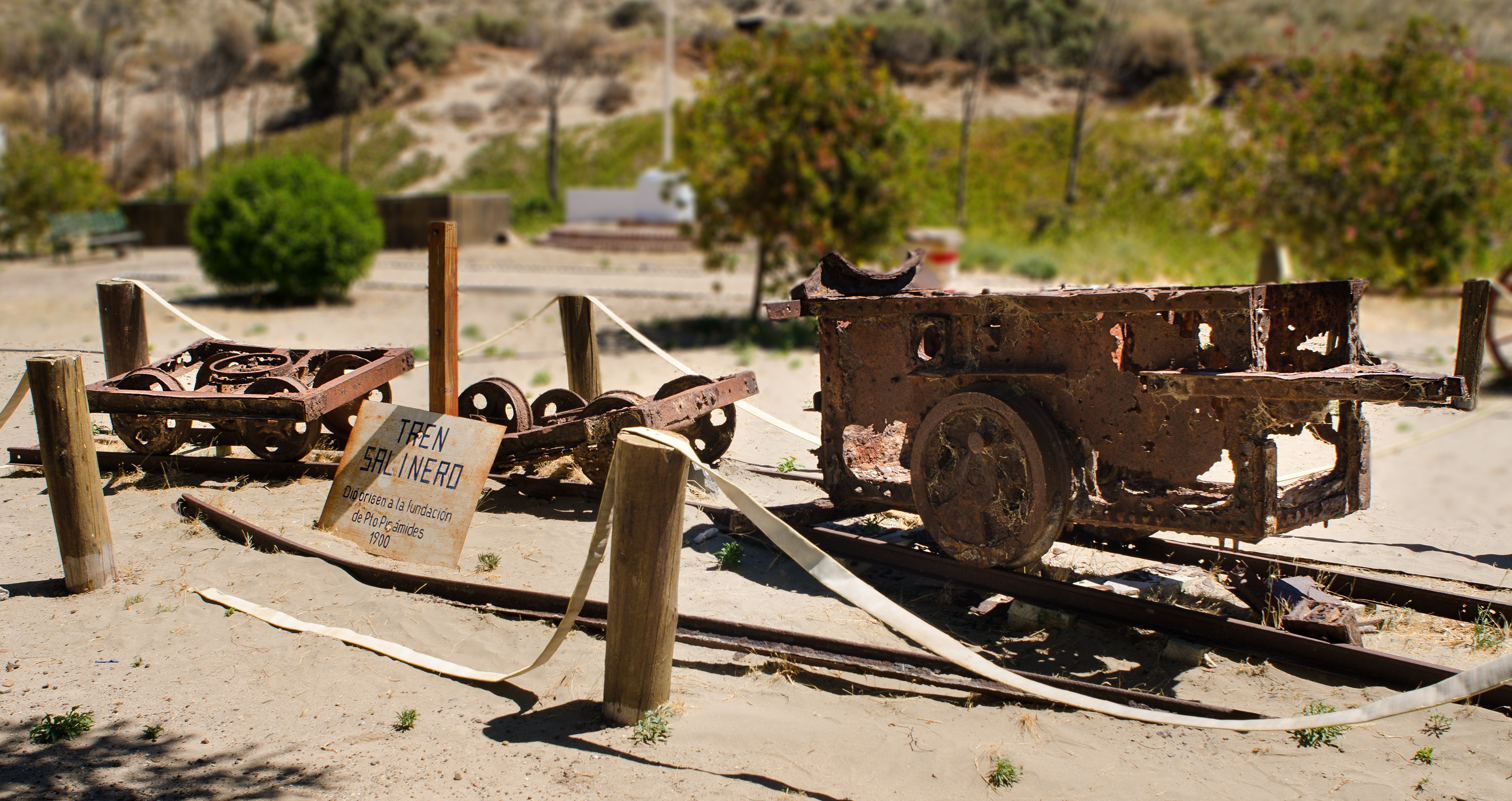
Remains of a goods wagon exhibited in Puerto Pirámides (2014).

Península Valdés had been founded by Spanish Juan de la Piedra, Francisco de Viedma among others, who established the first settlement as the Kingdom of Spain requested. The lack of sweet water resulted in numerous searches along the peninsula until the salt flats were discovered.

Italian settler Antonio Munno was the first one who received a concession to exploit salt. He had arrived to Puerto Madryn in 1885 for the construction of Central Chubut Railway, then going to the National Geology Department in Buenos Aires to request permission for exploiting salt evaporation ponds. After the lands were measured in 1892, Munno started to exploit the ponds. Salt was stored in bags and carried to the port of San José, where it was loaded and transported to Bahía Blanca, Buenos Aires or Montevideo.

In 1898 Munno associated with Ernesto Piaggio and brothers Alejandro and José Ferro for a more effective exploitation of the salt ponds. Due to its better conditions as a natural port, Puerto Pirámides became the embarkation area. In July 1900, the National Congress granted Piaggio a concession to build a 34-km. narrow gauge railway line from Puerto Pirámides to the salt ponds, known as Salinas Grandes. Concession -given by Law N° 3.898- stated that the line would not receive neither subsidies nor guarantees from the state, committing Piaggio to begin works within two months after the project was approved. The rail line would also be finished within a year. The Law also cleared that construction materials for the line could be imported duty-free for 20 years. Likewise the concessionary should provide electrical telegraph and telephones to the stations during the first years of concession.

=== Construction ===
Engineer Mr. Belcridi was hired to a study and project of the railway line. During the works, a big camp was installed to host workers and their families while works were carried out. tracks were placed at first, then continuing with the buildings. A hotel, the headquarters, the fuel depot, a workshop and a warehouse to store tracks were built, apart from the post office and the houses for locomotive drivers and other workers.

The line was opened in June 1901, being transferred to salt company Ferro y Piaggio, owned by Piaggio and the Ferro Brothers although Munno was also part of the society. Apart from operating the rail line, Ferro y Piaggio was the concession of 15,000 hectare in Salinas Grandes, where the production reached 12,000 tons. By 1902 the railway carried 2,300 tons of cargo but it still had no passenger services. Piaggio requested a concession for a railway from the ponds to an alternative port, over the edges of San José gulf. The concession was granted but works never started.

Because of the railway line, numerous people came to the region, establishing there to start their shops and commercial activities. The city of Puerto Pirámides would be established later by those settlers, due to all the materials for the construction of the railway were unloaded there. The buildings were described as "fragile", made in sheets of iron and wood.

The railway owned five steam locomotives, being a 0-4-0T Krauss 2249 (1890), a 0-6-0 Jung 451 (1900) and three 0-6-0 Orenstein & Koppel among them, a part of three goods wagons and one passenger cars. A 1903 stock list summarizes 30 wagons and one caboose.

=== Closure ===
Since World War I the salt production (due in part to the development of chillers as a more modern method for the conservation of food) started decreasing so the company's revenues were not as expected. Many inhabitants of Puerto Pirámides left the village because of the depression.

Creditors took over the Piaggio y Cía's debts, creating "Empresa Salinera Argentina" (Argentine Salt Company) with partners such as Banco de la Nación Argentina, W. Cooper y Cía. and La Italia, an insurance company. Nevertheless, Empresa Salinera Argentina was wind up in 1916.

All the company's assets were acquired by entrepreneur Alejandro Ferro, although the lack of documents or titles that proved his rights over the line made the railway was closed in 1920. The Government of Chubut expropriated the railway line area in 1958. A report by United States Department of Commerce revealed that the railway was deficient since 1916 although financial problems had begun in 1904. The report also said that the harvesting of salt had ceased before Ferro acquired the company. The inhabitants of Puerto Pirámides decreased until the 1970s when tourism industry rejuvenated the city.

Several years after the closure of the line, rail tracks were removed, and the rolling stock auctioned or sold as scrap. The few pieces surviving are currently exhibited at the Península Valdés Museum and a park in Puerto Pirámides.
