= Vál Valley Light Railway =

Railway line in Hungary

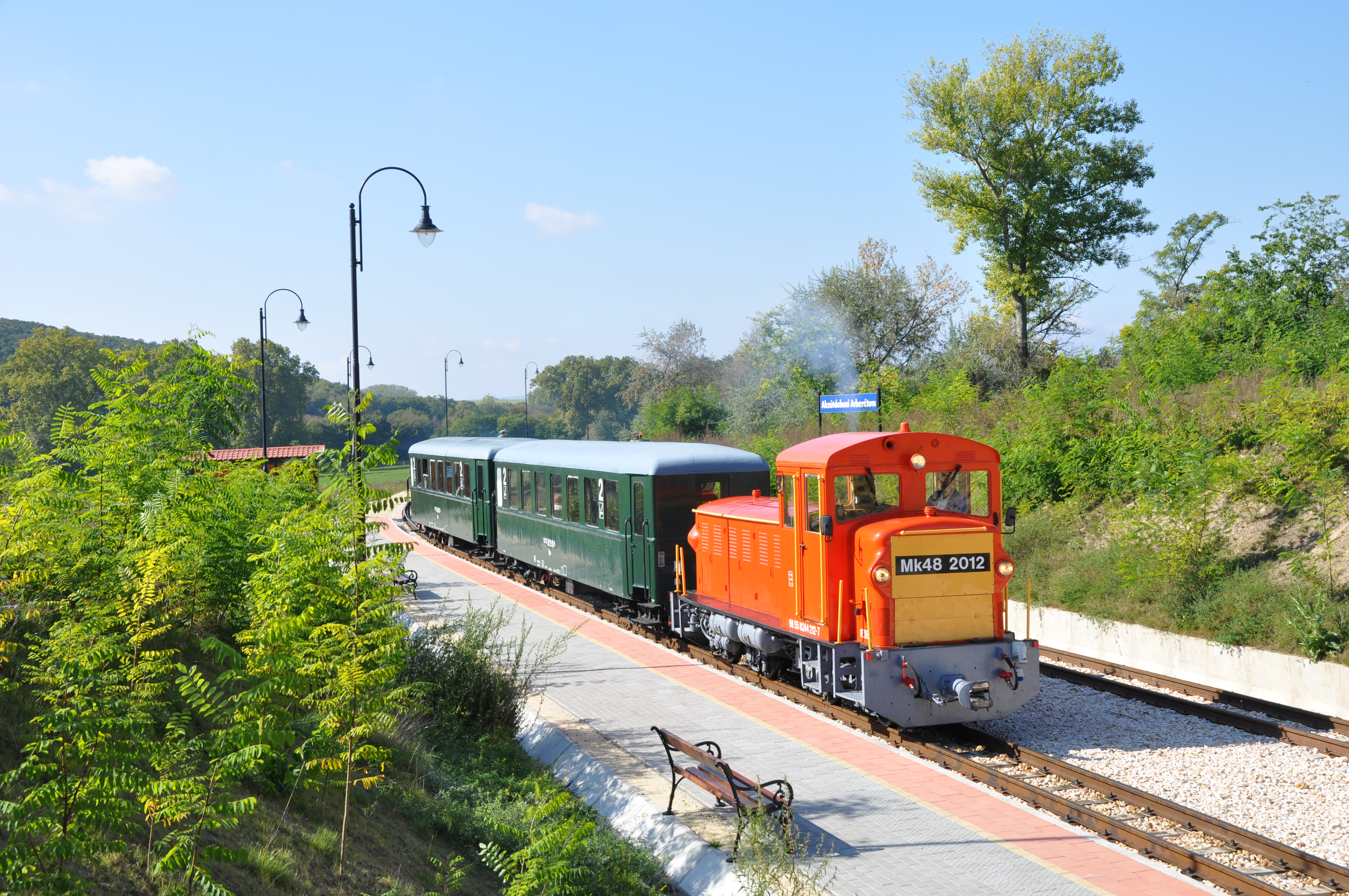
- Vál Valley train at the Arboretum station in Alcsút

Overview
- Native name: Vál-völgyi Kisvasút
- Locale: Hungary
- Termini: Arboretum in Alcsút; Puskás Academy
- Stations: 3
- Website: https://www.valvolgyikisvasut.hu/

Service
- Route number: 6

History
- Opened: 2016

Technical
- Line length: 5.693 km (4 mi)
- Track gauge: 760 mm (2 ft 5 15/16 in) Bosnian gauge

The Vál Valley Light Railway (Hungarian: Vál-völgyi Kisvasút) is a 6 km long 760 mm gauge railway in Hungary. It is built on part of the Bicske–Székesfehérvár railway line. The building of the line was supported by the European Union, who have since launched an OLAF investigation into the funding.

== Controversy ==
Viktor Orbán, Prime Minister of Hungary has been accused of misusing €2M of EU money contributed to the construction of the railway. The funding request was based on 2,500 passengers using the line daily. The true ridership is one thousandth of this, and the village of Felcsút only has a population of 1,812.

== Motive Power ==
Identity	Works Number	Type	Gauge	Builder	Year built	Previous Operator	Status	Notes	Image
98 55 8244 212-7	035	B-B DH	760 mm (2 ft 5 15/16 in)	Rába	1961	Nyírvidéki Kisvasút	Operational	Mk48 2012	
98 55 8244 216-8	039	B-B DH	760 mm (2 ft 5 15/16 in)	Rába	1961	Nyírvidéki Kisvasút	Operational	Mk48 2016	
