= Lillafüred Forest Train =

Lillafüred Forest Train Lillafüredi Állami Erdei Vasút (330, 331, 331a (discontinued), 331b (discontinued))
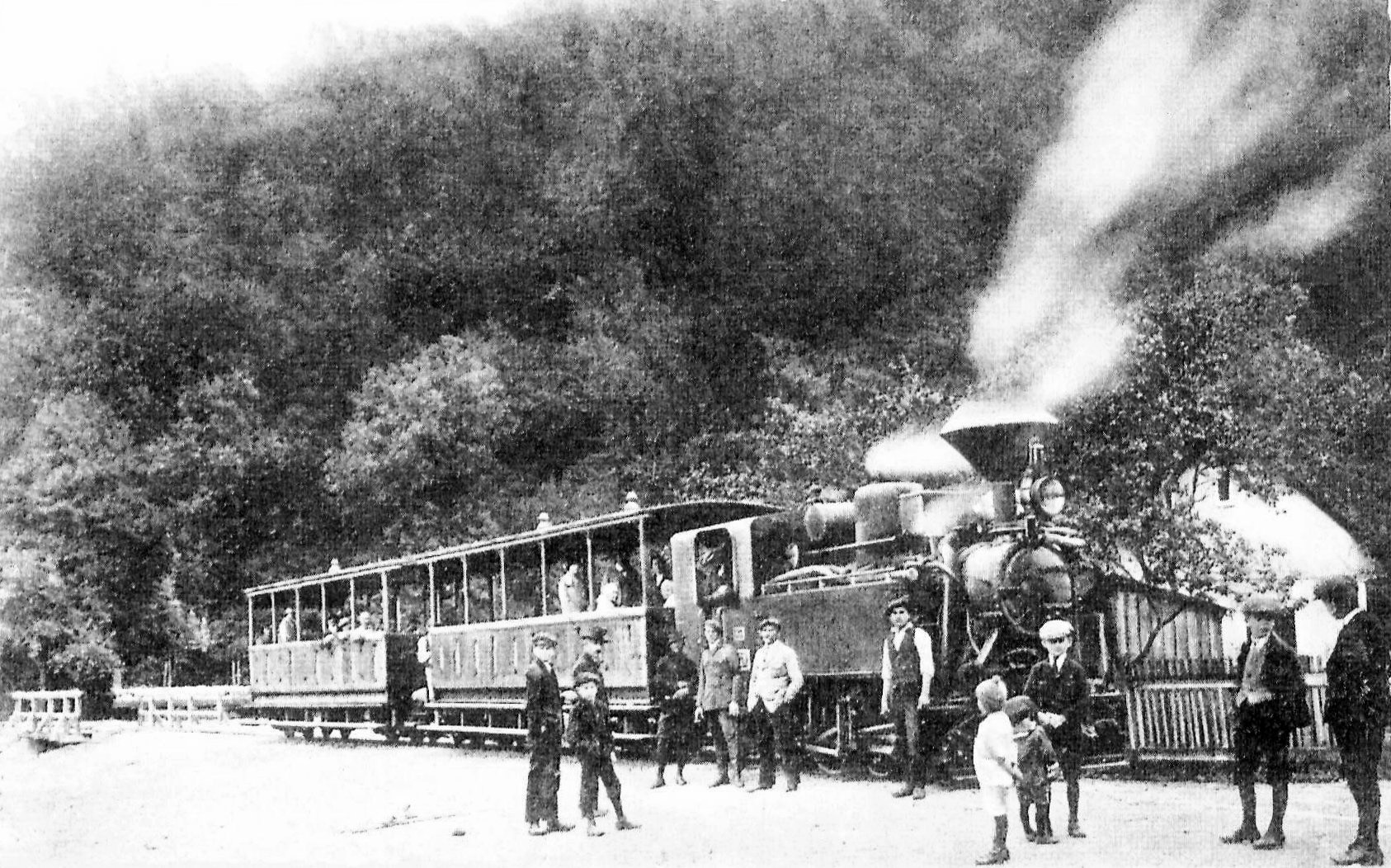
- Lillafüred Forest Train in 1928
- Locale: Hungary
- Coordinates: 48.11006°N 20.67524°E

Commercial operations
- Original gauge: 760 mm

Preserved operations
- Preserved gauge: 760 mm

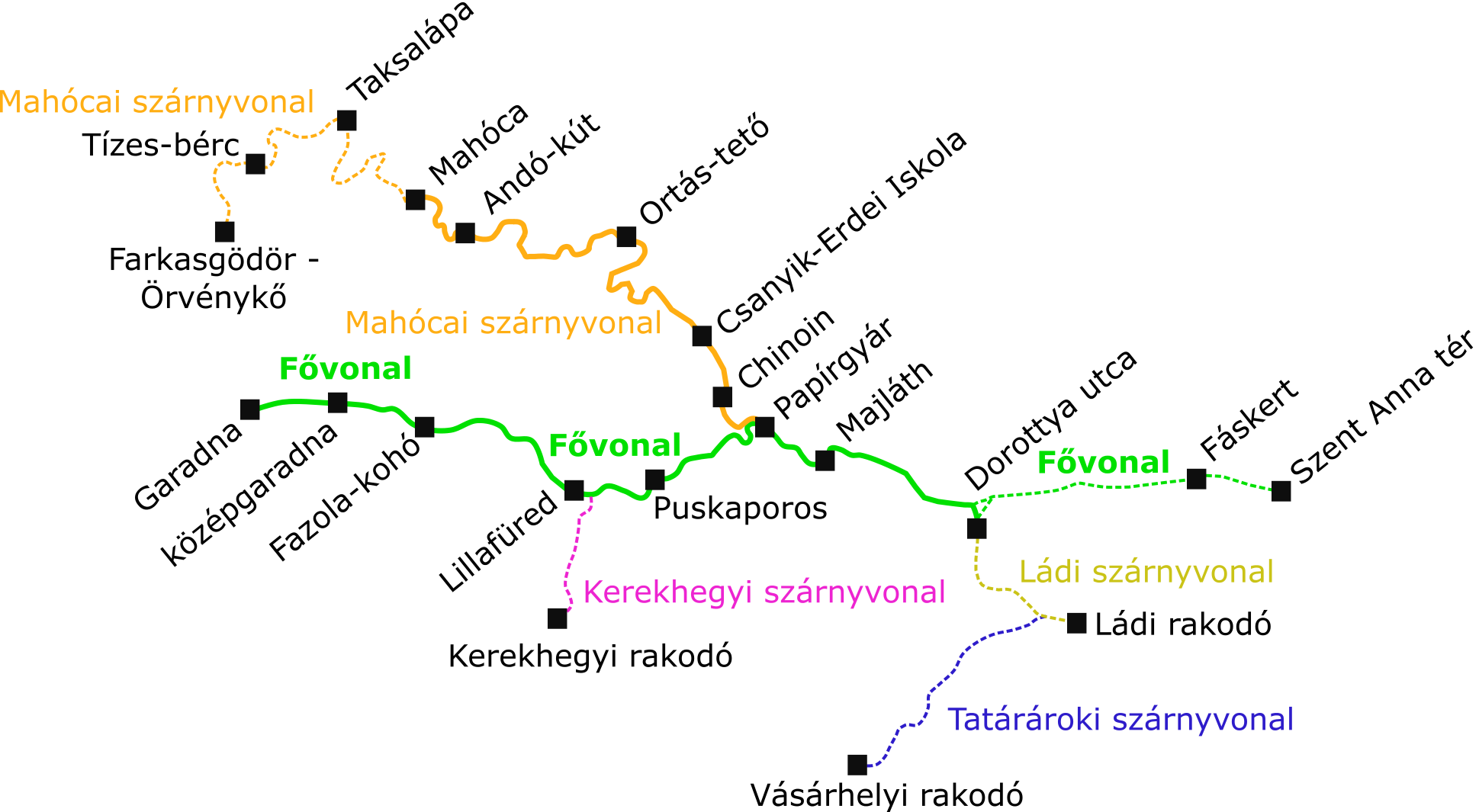

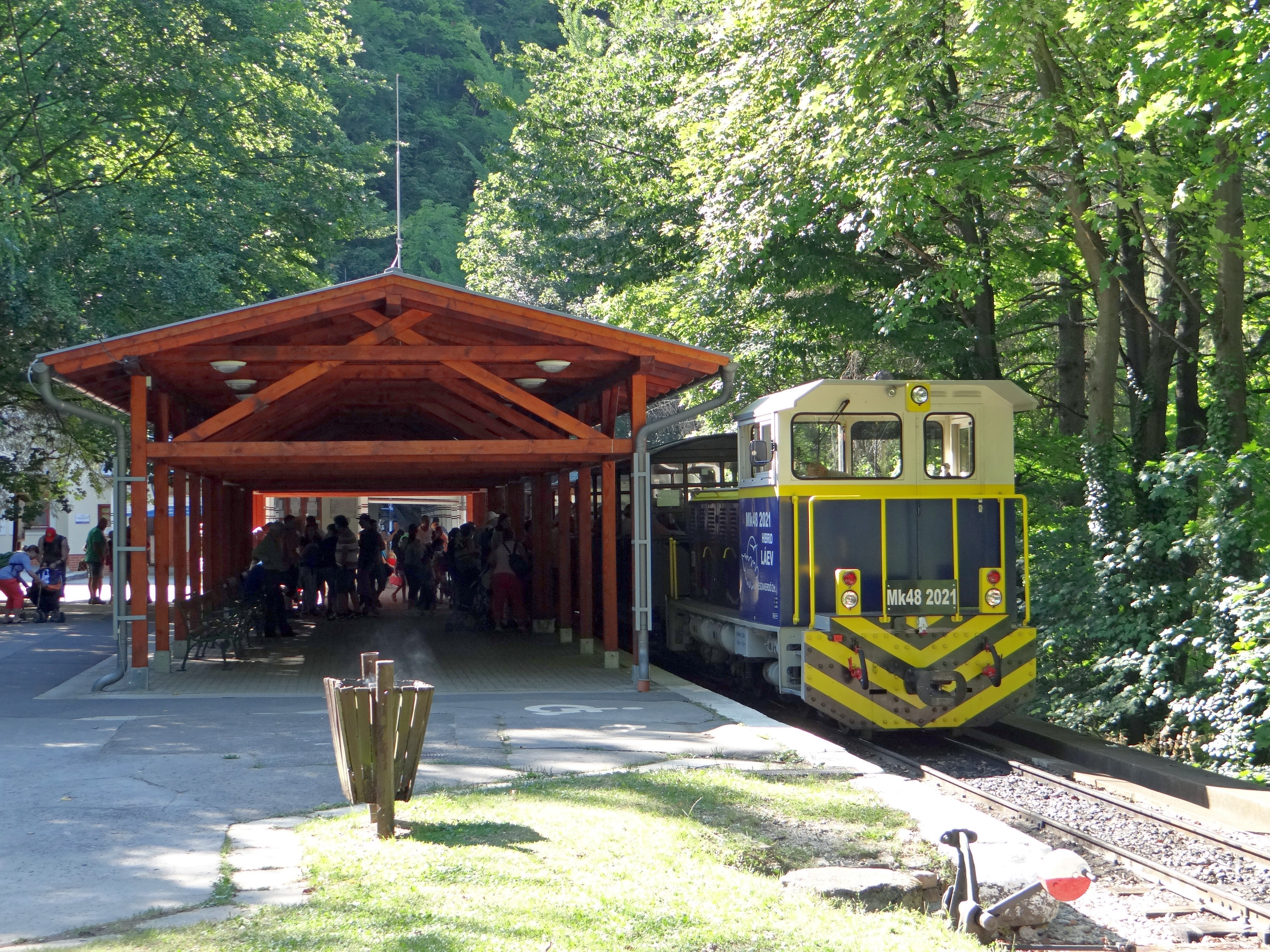
The train in Lillafüred

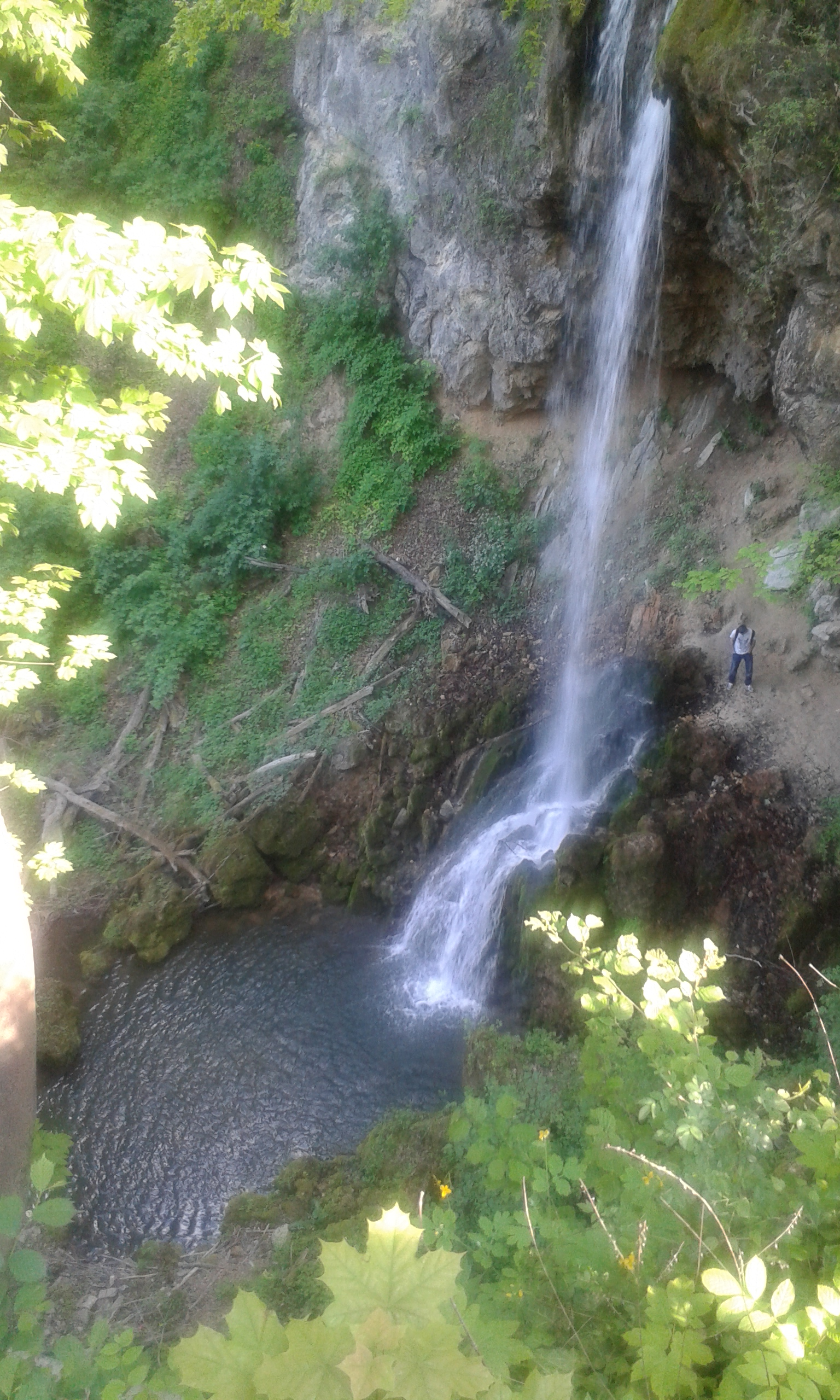
Waterfall at Lillafüred

The Lillafüred Forest Train is a narrow-gauge tourist railway in Hungary. The railway opened as the Lillafüredi State Forest Railway (Lillafüredi Állami Erdei Vasút or LÁEV) in 1920. It originally carried freight only (mainly wood from the forests of the Bükk Mountains) but a passenger service was introduced in the third year of operation. In 1990, the freight service was withdrawn but the railway continued to carry passengers as a tourist railway.

== Route ==
The railway runs from Dorottya Street station in Miskolc to Garadna, deep in the Bükk Mountains. A branch line towards Mahóca occasionally runs for special events.

== Tourist attractions within reach ==
- Castle of Diósgyőr
- Zoo and Culture Park of Miskolc
- Diósgyőr Paper Mill
- Palace Hotel, Lillafüred
- Lake Hámori and waterfall
- Caves in the karstic mountain
- Fazola furnace (industrial monument)
- Trout farm
