= Bosnian-gauge railways =

Railway track gauge (760 mm)

Bosnian-gauge railways are railways with track gauge of 760 mm (2 ft 5 15/16 in). These were found extensively in the former Austro-Hungarian Empire as a standardised form of narrow gauge. The name is also used for lines of the same gauge outside Bosnia, for example in Austria. Similar track gauges are the 2 ft 6 in (762 mm) and 750 mm (2 ft 5 1/2 in) gauge.

== History ==
After a British proposal the 1878 Berlin Congress permitted Austria-Hungary to occupy and govern Bosnia-Herzegovina instead of Turkey, the 190 km (120 mi) long Brod–Zenica military railway was built to support manoeuvres and supply troops. It was completed in 1879, using the 760 mm (2 ft 5 15/16 in) temporary tracks and rolling stock used during the construction of the recently finished Timisoara–Oršava line. The Zenica–Sarajevo extension opened in 1882, with a loading gauge the same as that used on 1,000 mm (3 ft 3 3/8 in) gauge railways, which was thought to be sufficient for general traffic including passenger services.

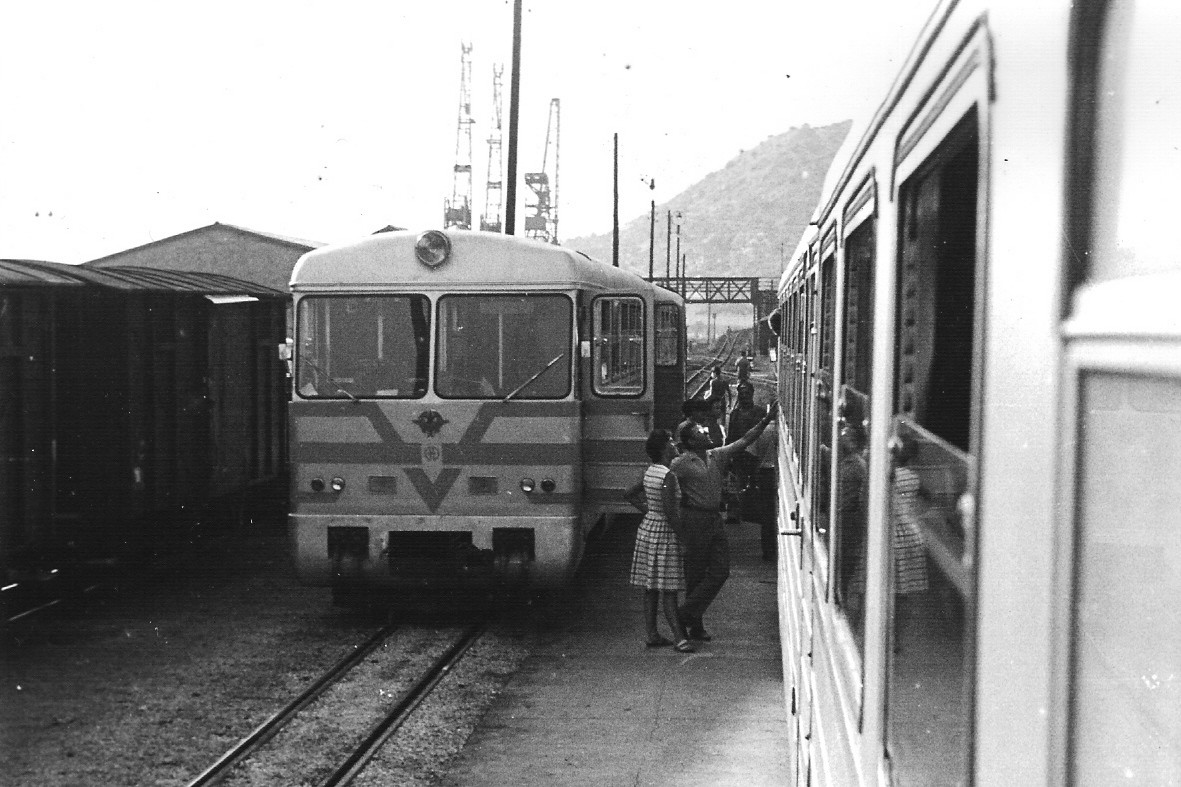
Narrow-gauge railway that once reached Dubrovnik, southern Croatia (photo from 1967).

The Brod–Zenica–Sarajevo Bosna Bahn provided the basis for the narrow-gauge railway network which was later established in Bosnia-Herzegovina. In barely two decades a national 760 mm network was built. By the 1890s this stretched through Mostar to the Dalmatian border at Metković, and to Gruž, a suburb of Dubrovnik, on the coast of the Adriatic Sea. This narrow gauge main line carried much heavier traffic than many of the minor 1,435 mm (4 ft 8 1/2 in) standard gauge main lines across the Austro-Hungarian Empire. At the time of their introduction, the Bosnia-Herzegovian National Railways' 2-4-2 express locomotives of 1894-96 were the fastest narrow gauge locomotives in Europe, with a 60 km/h (37 mph) permitted top speed.

The establishment of the fast-growing network, whose length by the start of the 20th centuries exceeded 1,000 km (620 mi) making it the once largest interconnected narrow gauge network in Europe, secured a high reputation for the Monarchy's engineering corps amongst international professional circles.

It was the success of the Bosnian narrow gauge net which gave impetus after the turn of the century to the large-scale building of 760 mm gauge lines across other territories of the Monarchy. The technical solutions pioneered there were used later on all the narrow-gauge railways of Austria-Hungary.

== Railways ==
Country/territory	Railway
Argentina	Península Valdés Railway
Austria	Main article: Narrow-gauge railways in Austria
Bosnia and Herzegovina	Main article: Narrow-gauge railways in Bosnia and Herzegovina
Bulgaria	Few railways, of which only Septemvri-Dobrinishte narrow gauge line (125.3 km or 77.9 mi) remains in operation
Croatia	Parenzana; Samoborček
Czech Republic	Jindřichohradecké místní dráhy; Třemešná ve Slezsku – Osoblaha Railway
DR Congo	Matadi–Kinshasa Railway
Denmark	See Narrow-gauge railways in Denmark
Dominican Republic	Dominican Central Railway, (later Ferrocarriles Unidos Dominicanos) 109 km (68 mi), in operation from 1897-c.1957 (defunct)
Hungary	Main article: Narrow-gauge railways in Hungary In operation: Children's railway, Budapest; Balatonfenyves Light Railway; Szob–Nagybörzsöny Forest Railway; Csömödér State Forest Railway; Debrecen Fun-Fair Railway; Felsőtárkány State Forest Railway; Gemenc State Forest Railway; Hortobágy-fishpond Light Railway; Kaszó State Forest Railway; Királyrét Forest Railway; Lillafüred State Forest Railway; Mátra Railway; Mecsek Light Railway; Mesztegnyő State Forest Railway; Pálház State Forest Railway; Széchenyi Museum Railway, Nagycenk; Szilvásvárad Forest Railway; Tömörkény Fishing Railway; Vál Valley Light Railway; Zsuzsi Forest Railway; Operation suspended since 2009: Kecskemét Light Railway; Nyír Area Light Railway; Tiszakécske Children's Railway
Italy	Fleims Valley Railway; Lokalbahn Mori–Arco–Riva; Parenzana; Val Gardena Railway (Grödner Railway)
Romania	Main article: Mocăniță: Vaser Valley line; Covasna-Comandău line, tourist heritage railway; Agnita railway line, tourist heritage railway over 7km Cornatel-Hosman section; Turda-Abrud Narrow-Gauge Railway (operation suspended); Transylvanian mining railway (dismantled); Viseu – Valea Vaserului (operating); Brad–Criscior (operating); Covasna–Comandau (operating); Moldovita–Argel (operating); Abrud–Campeni (operating); Sovata – Campu Cetatii (operating)
Serbia	Šargan Eight tourist heritage railway
Slovakia	Čierny Hron River Railway; Historical Logging Switchback Railway in Vychylovka; Trenčianske Teplice tram line; Several other logging railroads
Slovenia	Parenzana; Railway Poljčane–Slovenske Konjice–Zreče
Uruguay	Ferrocarril Pan de Azucar - Piriapolis (defunct)

== See also ==
- List of town tramway systems in Croatia
- List of track gauges
- Sarajevo Tramway
