= Fishery Railway Hortobágy =

Coordinates: 47.605481°N 21.069639°E

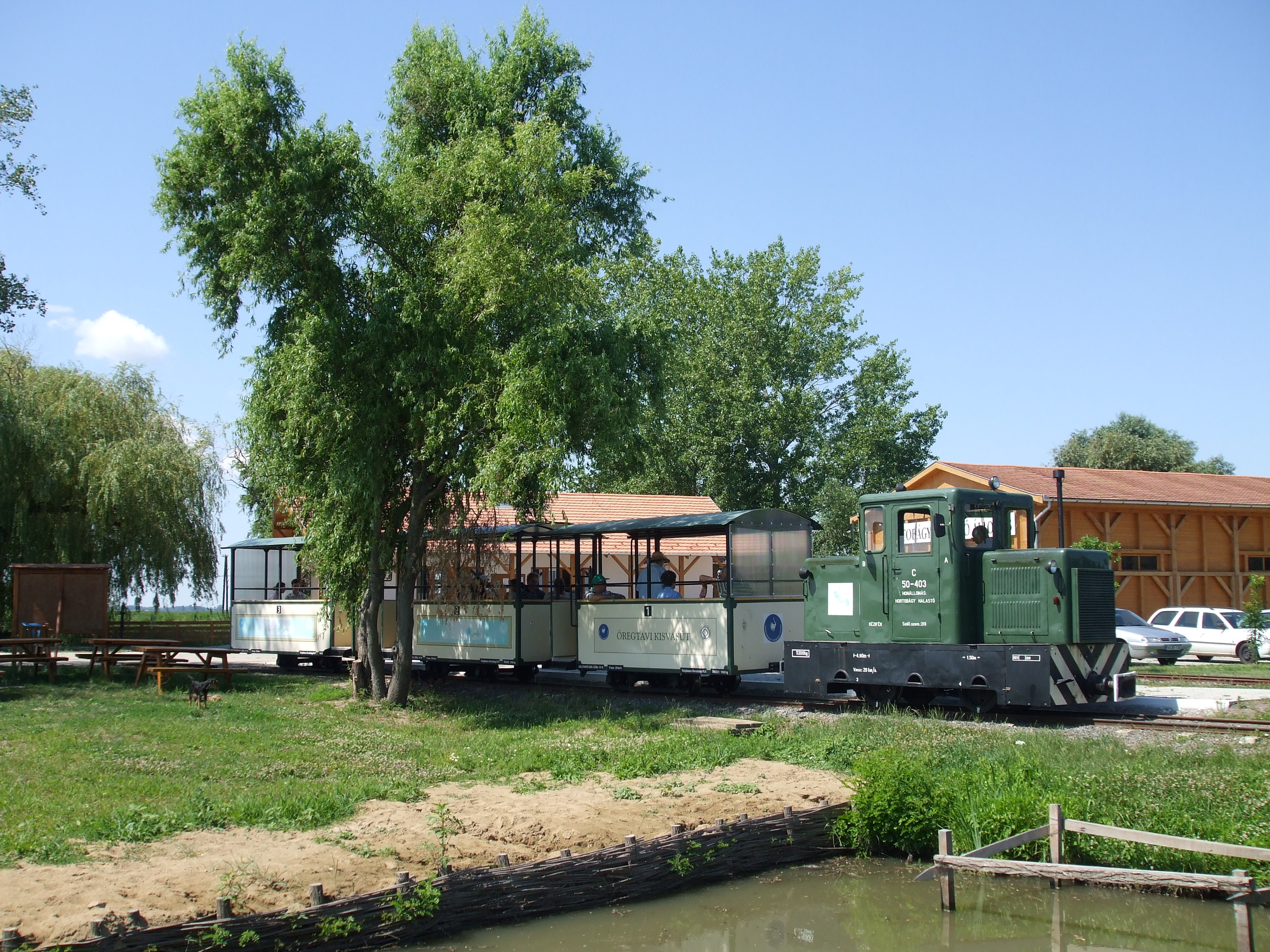
- Fishery Railway Hortobágy

Technical
- Line length: Formerly 35 km (22 mi); Now 4.9 km (3.0 mi)
- Track gauge: 760 mm (2 ft 5 15/16 in)
- Operating speed: 20 km/h max.

The Fishery Railway Hortobágy (Hungarian: Hortobágy-halastavi Kisvasút) is a narrow gauge railway with a gauge of 760 mm (2 ft 5 15/16 in) at the fish ponds near Hortobágy in Hungary. It is the only fishery railway in Europe that operates with locomotives.

== History ==
The railway was built and commissioned in 1915. The tracks had formerly a length of 35 km (22 mi), of which are 4.9 km (3.0 mi) still in operation. Formerly steam and diesel locomotives moved trains with fish food from the silo in Hortobágyi-Halastó at the standard gauge railway lint to the fish ponds, which had been built in the 19th century. In the other direction they transported freshly caught fish. The railway was temporarily decommissioned in 1960. All goods are now transported by lorries.

Since 2007, the railway is used as a tourist train. A one-way trip lasts 23 min.

Sadly, the railway has not operated since 2022 or 2023. As of November 2024, the Hortobagyi National Park website states that - for technical reasons - it will be closed for the foreseeable future. Recent pictures on the internet show that the track is now very badly overgrown in parts. Unless there is a substantial investment, its return to operations is unlikely.

== Rolling stock ==
There are two diesel locomotives of the type C-50 and a decommissioned MV Kuli. Three passenger cars have been built on the trucks of four wheel goods wagons. In 2006 a larger four wheel passenger car was built. In addition there are some well-worn goods wagons.

== Photos ==
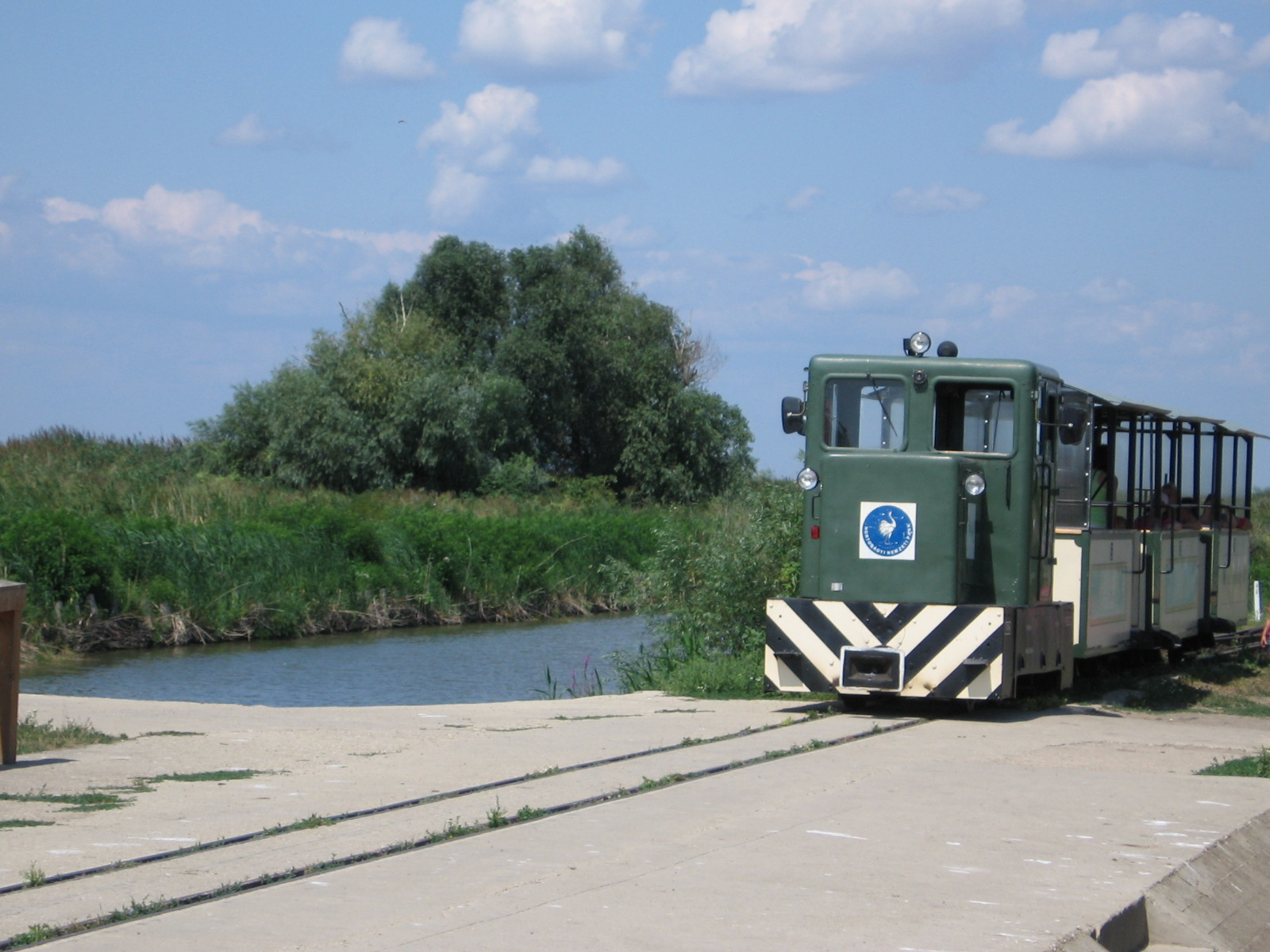
Diesel locomotive C-50

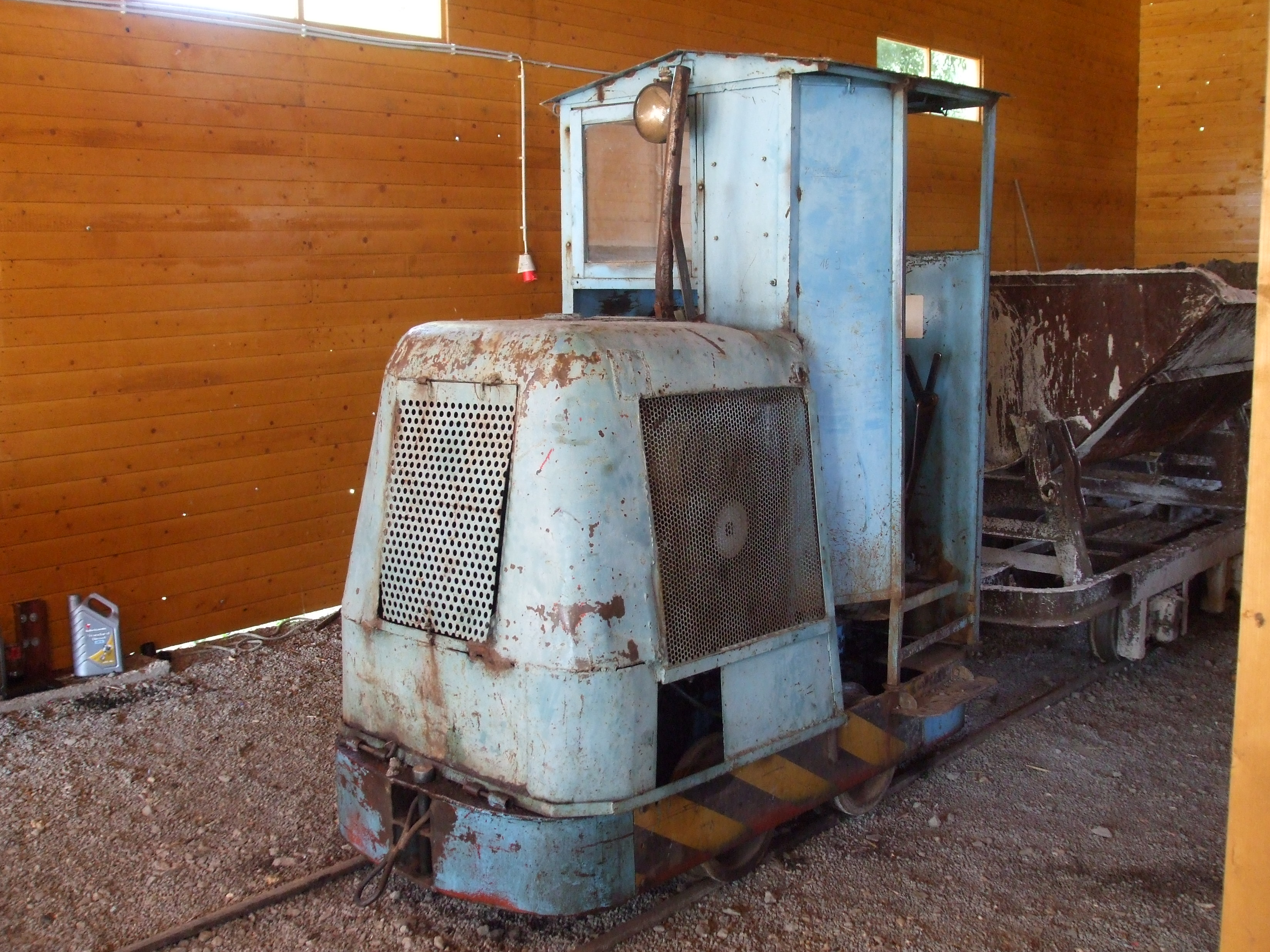
Permanent way maintenance train with MV Kuli

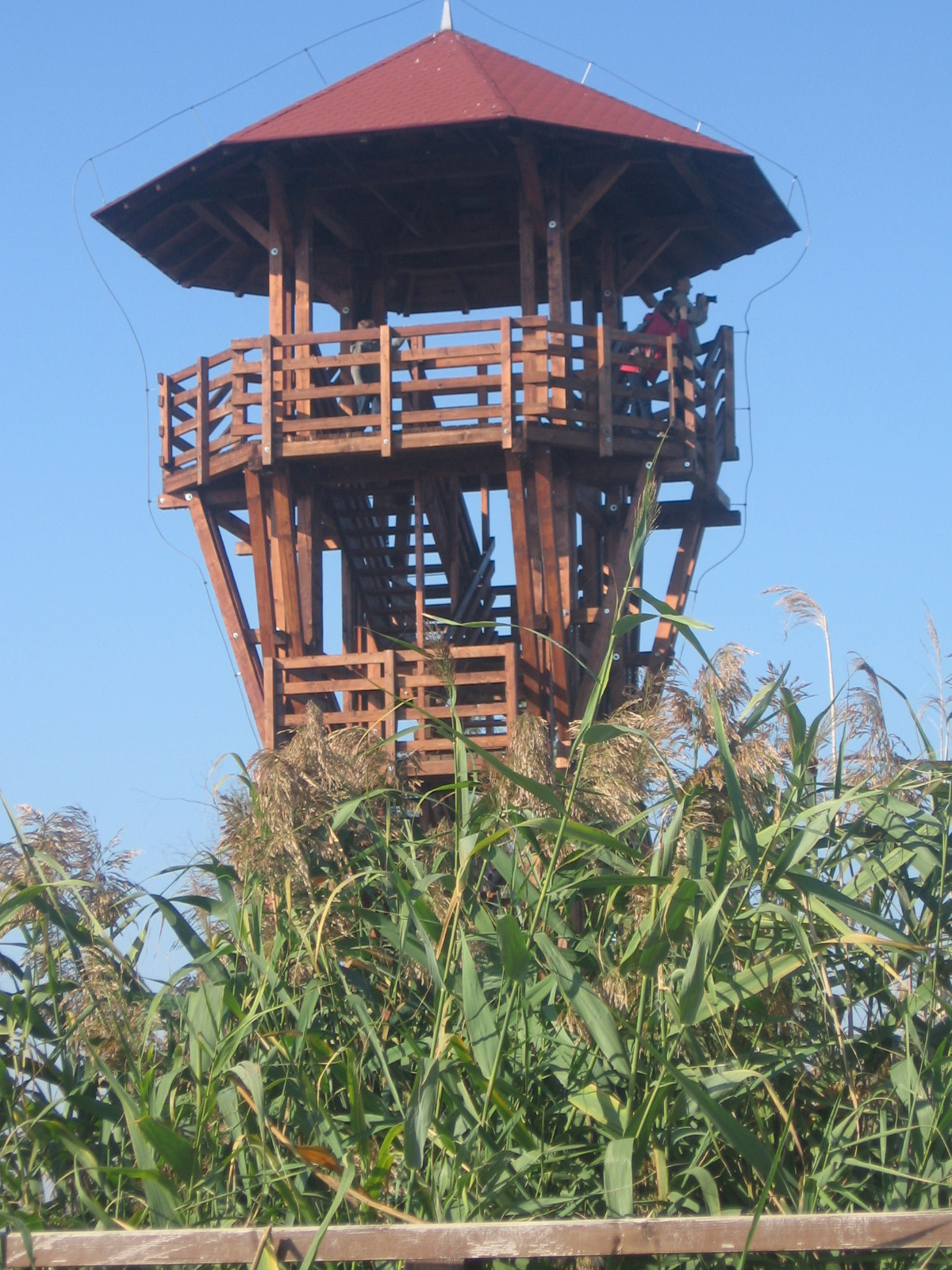
Modern sight seeing tower

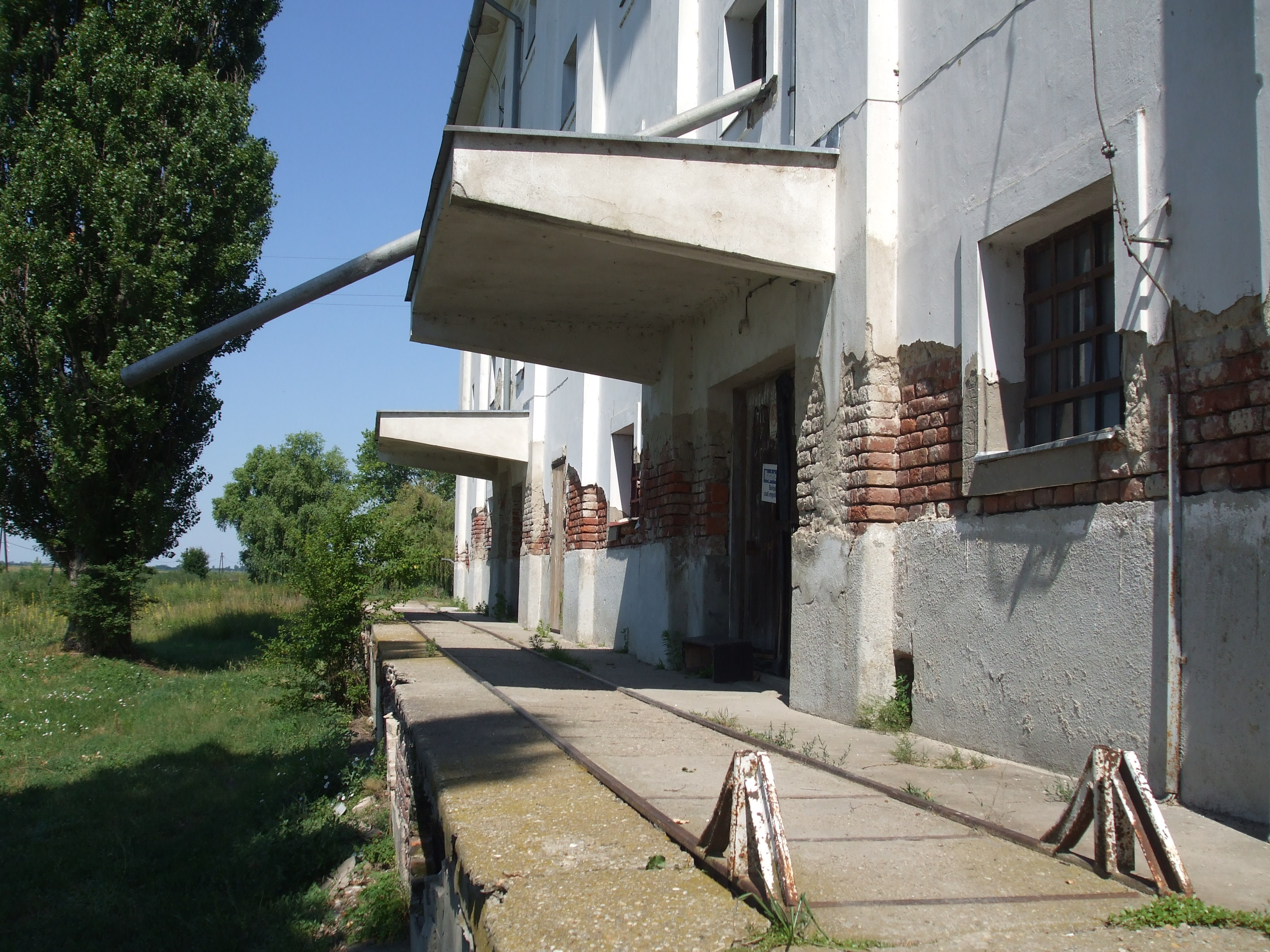
Railway tracks at the silo

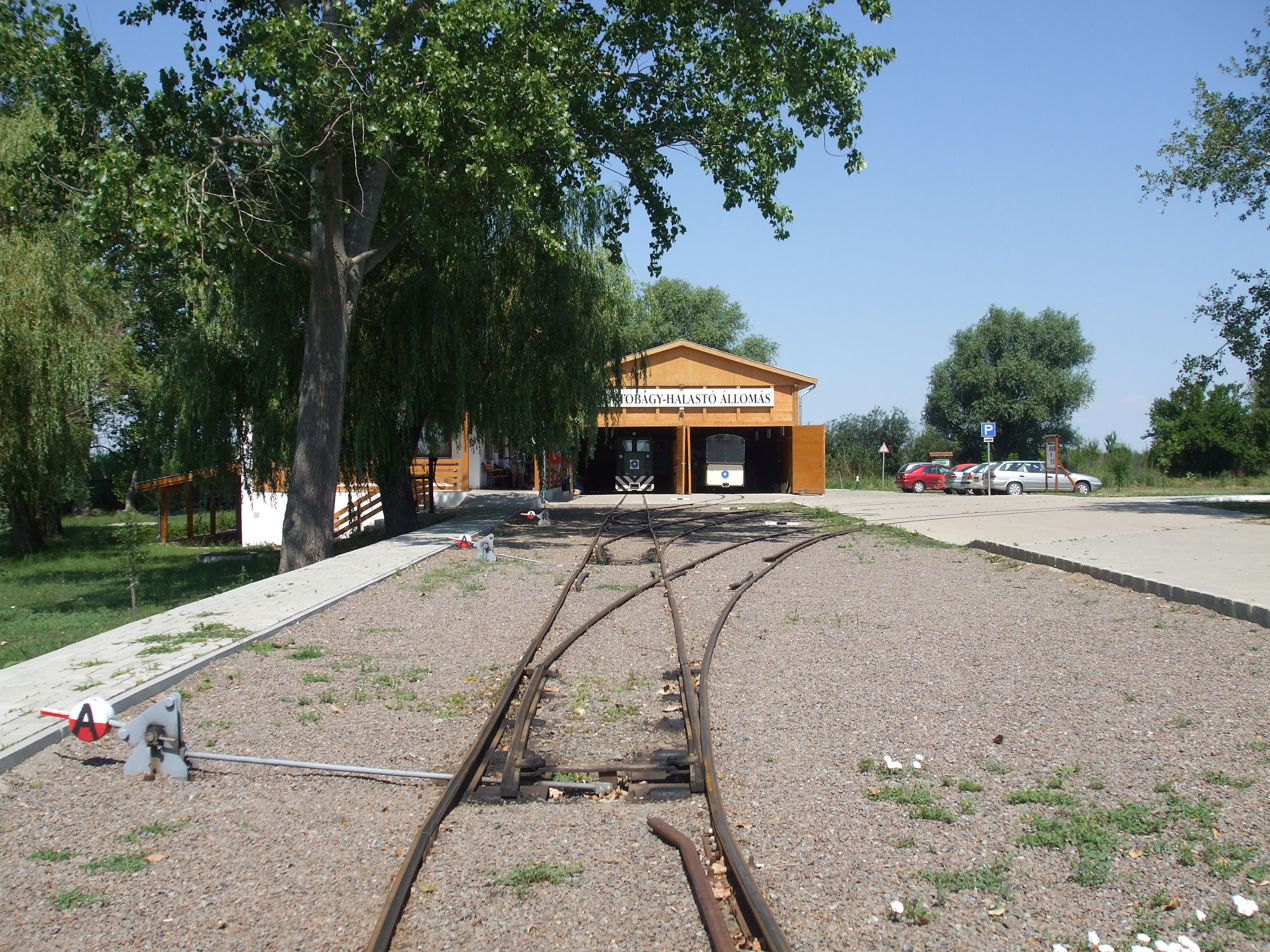
Depot

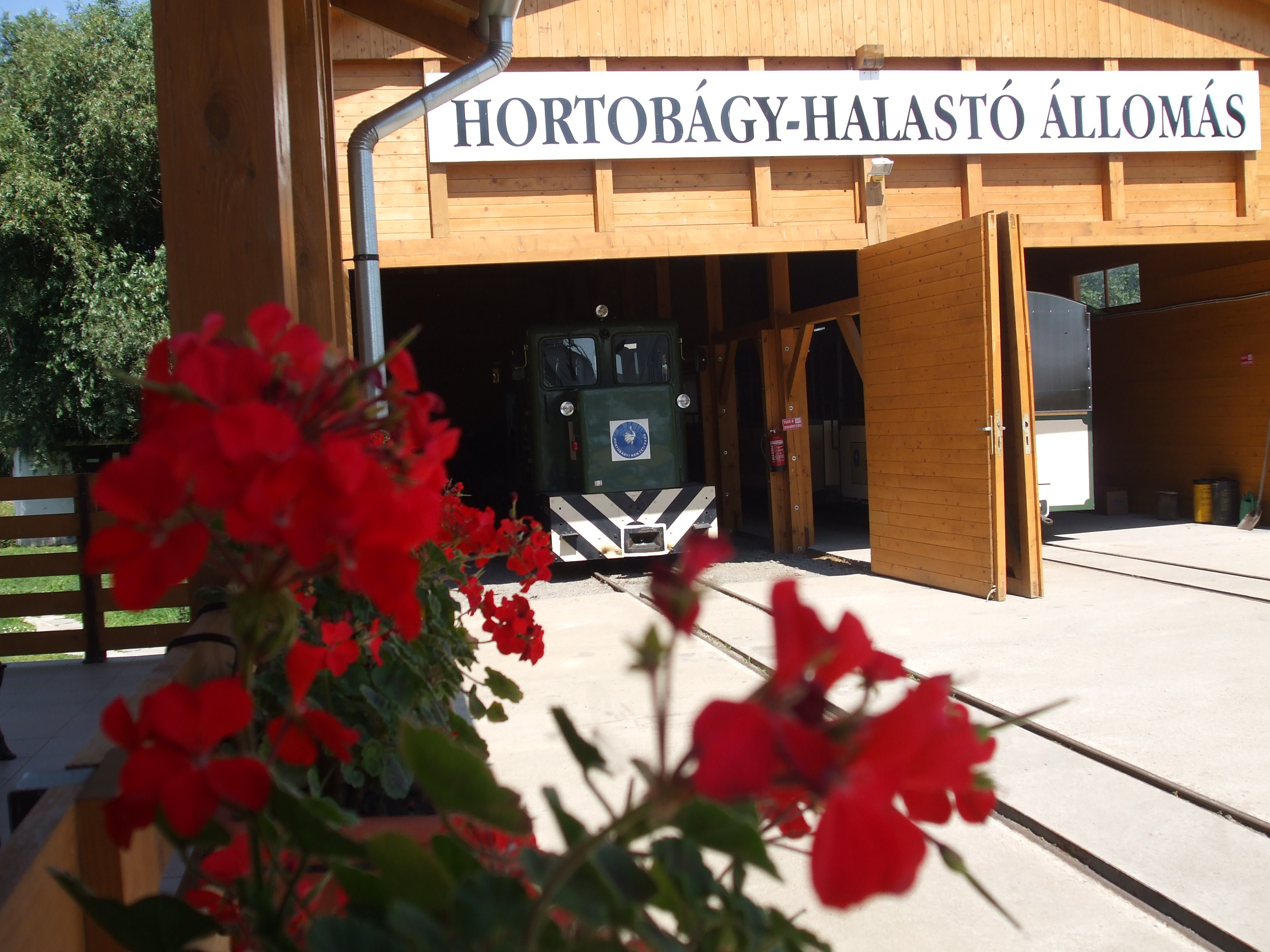
Shed

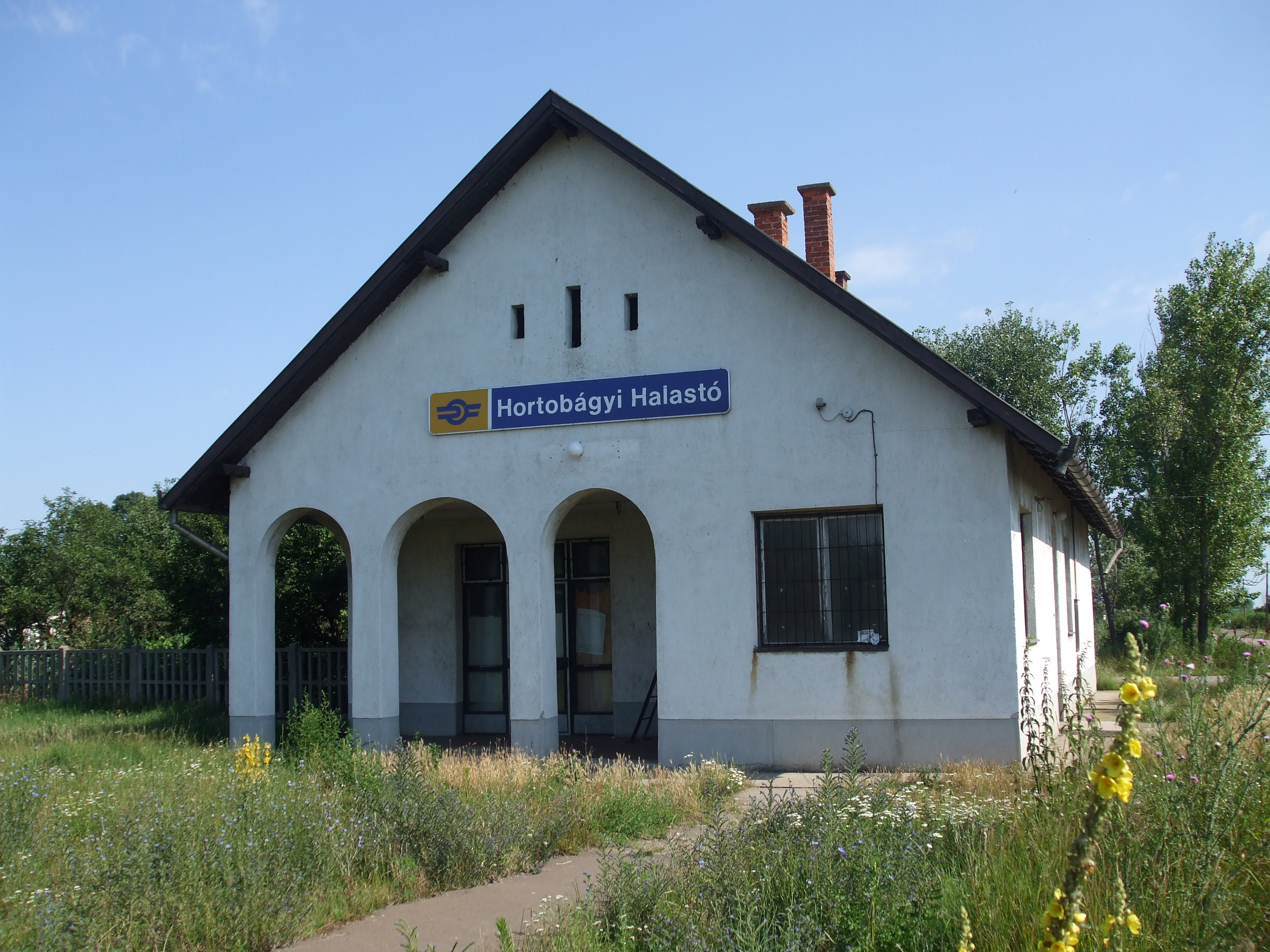
Hortobágy–Halastó station
