= Aleksandar Čotrić =

Serbian politician (born 1966)

- Александар Чотрић
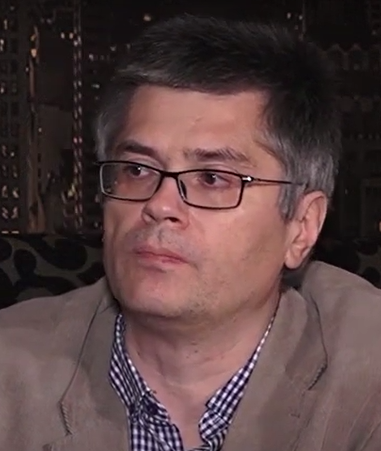
- Čotrić in 2021

Personal details
- Born: 14 September 1966 (age 60) Loznica, SR Serbia, SFR Yugoslavia
- Party: Serbian Freedom Movement (1990); Serbian Renewal Movement (1990–2026)
- Education: Univ. of Belgrade Fac. of Law
- Occupation: Politician
- Profession: Writer

Aleksandar Čotrić (Serbian Cyrillic: Александар Чотрић; born 25 September 1966) is a politician in Serbia. He has served several terms in the National Assembly of Serbia since 1994 as a member of the Serbian Renewal Movement (Srpski pokret obnove, SPO). He was also an executive member of Belgrade's municipal government from 1997 to 2000 and a deputy minister in Serbia's government from 2004 to 2007, with responsibility for the Serbian diaspora.

== Early life and private career ==
Čotrić was born in Loznica, in what was then the Socialist Republic of Serbia in the Socialist Federal Republic of Yugoslavia, and is a graduate of the University of Belgrade Faculty of Law. He has written several books and is a noted composer of aphorisms. In a 2007 interview, he argued that the aphorism ("a sharp proverb with a twist") had become a popular literary form in Serbia by virtue of providing darkly humorous responses to the country's many social and political upheavals. He added that when he published a book of aphorisms in Sweden it failed because "everyone there is too happy." Among the lines credited to Čotrić is, "Why shouldn't we be proud of our past, when each new day is worse than the previous one?"

== Political career ==
=== The Milošević years ===
==== Early years in opposition ====
From 1990 to 2000, politics in Serbia and the Federal Republic of Yugoslavia were dominated by the Socialist Party of Serbia under the leadership of Slobodan Milošević. Various opposition parties sought to break Milošević's hold on power during these years, often via fragile coalitions with one another.

Čotrić was a founding member of the Serbian Renewal Movement in 1990. He first sought election to the Serbian assembly in the 1992 parliamentary election, appearing in the thirteenth position in the Užice division on the electoral list of the Democratic Movement of Serbia (Demokratski pokret Srbije, DEPOS), a coalition of opposition parties that included the SPO. DEPOS won six mandates in this division, and Čotrić was not included in his party's delegation to the assembly. (From 1992 to 2000, Serbia's electoral law stipulated that one-third of parliamentary mandates would be assigned to candidates from successful lists in numerical order, while the remaining two-thirds would be distributed amongst other candidates on the lists by the sponsoring parties. Čotrić was not listed high enough to win an automatic mandate, nor was he granted a mandate by the SPO.) He was promoted to the fifth position on the DEPOS list in Užice for the 1993 election; the alliance again won six mandates for the division, and Čotrić was this time selected by the SPO to serve in its delegation. He took his seat when the assembly convened in early 1994.

In September 1994, SPO leader Vuk Drašković promoted Čotrić to the party's executive. The following year, Čotrić accused Serbian police of smuggling petrol and military supplies into the Republika Srpska territory in Bosnia and Herzegovina in defiance of an official blockade; in this context, he urged the government to protect citizens near the Zvornik border crossing from illegal police harassment or, as he said, "we will do it ourselves." In 1996, after the signing of the Dayton Accord and the end of the Bosnian War, Čotrić announced that the SPO would not contest elections in Bosnia and Herzegovina on the grounds that there were no "media, financial or any other conditions for a democratic vote in either the Republika Srpska or the Muslim-Croat federation."

The SPO and the Democratic Party (Demokratska stranka, DS) led an alliance of opposition parties known as Zajedno (Together) in the 1996 Serbian local elections, and Čotrić ran as a candidate of the alliance in Belgrade. The group was belatedly recognized as having won the Belgrade election in February 1997, following disputed official results and an extended period of street protests. Čotrić was elected to the city assembly and was subsequently named to Belgrade's executive council as minister of information. He was also appointed to the board of RTV Studio B. In May 1997, he announced that the city would sue the Tanjug state news agency for "carrying vicious lies about the new city authorities" and for not meeting contractual financial obligations. He was quoted as saying, "Over the last three months since the new authorities were installed in Belgrade, Tanjug has not carried a single positive or unbiased piece of news. Only negative commentaries based on fabrications have been carried."

==== Breakup of Zajedno ====
The SPO contested the 1997 parliamentary election on its own, and Čotrić was re-elected after receiving the top position on the party's list in the Šabac division.

The Zajedno alliance collapsed in the Belgrade city assembly shortly after the 1997 parliamentary election, and the SPO was able to take all of the major positions in the city government, supported informally by delegates from the Socialist Party and the Serbian Radical Party. On September 30, Čotrić was chosen by the new city government as chair of the board of RTV Studio B. In February 1998, he announced that the station would probably not renew Voice of America's "America Calling Serbia" program due to what Čotrić described as its un-objective editorial policy. (Later in the same week, the station's editor-in-chief Dragan Kojadinović announced that the transmissions of the program would continue, following assurances by Voice of America that changes would be made.)

In 1998, Čotrić said that the SPO favoured the presence of international observers during negotiations between Serbia and Albanian nationalist groups over the status of Kosovo-Metohija; he added that the Albanian side "[did] not have any arguments to sustain its unrealistic secessionist demands" and that the presence of international observers would deprive the Albanian side of "an alibi for its refusal to take part in negotiations."

==== Renewed opposition to Milošević ====
The SPO consolidated its partnership with the Socialist Party by joining the Yugoslavian government in January 1999, but the alliance proved to be short-lived: SPO leader Vuk Drašković resigned from the government in April against the backdrop of the NATO bombing of Yugoslavia, and the party returned to opposition at the federal and republic levels. The SPO remained the governing party at the city level in Belgrade.

In April 1999, Čotrić spoke publicly against efforts by the Yugoslav Army to influence Studio B's editorial policy. He took part in protests against the Milošević administration after the end of NATO's campaign, and in November 1999 he accused the government of having tried to assassinate Drašković, following a suspicious car crash that killed four leading SPO members and that Drašković himself barely survived. As 1999 came to an end, Čotrić announced that the SPO would lead demonstrations for early elections in Serbia and Yugoslavia. The following March, he joined other opposition leaders at a rally in Kraljevo to protest against a media crackdown by the state authorities.

State authorities forcibly took over Studio B on May 17, 2000. Čotrić responded by urging Belgrade residents to defend the station with street protests, saying that the takeover had been carried out by a "fascist coalition which has been killing the Serbian people for years now, and which killed Studio B this morning." Later in the same day, he announced a unique form of protest wherein Studio B journalists would read out the nightly news to assembled Belgraders from the balconies at city hall.

In June 2000, Čotrić accused DS leader Zoran Đinđić of meeting secretly with Milošević, a charge that Đinđić denied.

=== The fall of Milošević and after ===
==== 2000–07 ====
The Milošević administration fell in October 2000, when Slobodan Milošević was defeated for the presidency of Yugoslavia by Democratic Party of Serbia (Demokratska stranka Srbije, DSS) leader Vojislav Koštunica. Public protests forced the resignation of Milošević's ally Mirko Marjanović as prime minister of Serbia shortly thereafter, and the SPO joined a caretaker administration to oversee the functions of government in Serbia until new elections could be held. Čotrić was appointed to represent the SPO on the board of Radio Television of Serbia.

Čotrić sought re-election to the Belgrade assembly in the 2000 Serbian local elections, which were held concurrently with the Yugoslavian presidential election. He was defeated in Palilula's fourth constituency by Zoran Luković of the Democratic Opposition of Serbia (DOS), a broad coalition of opposition parties that did not include the SPO.

The subsequent 2000 Serbian parliamentary election was held in December under a revised electoral system in which the entire country was counted as a single electoral division, with members elected via proportional representation. The DOS won the election in a landslide; the SPO ran its own slate and did not receive a sufficient number of votes to cross the electoral threshold. Đinđić became Serbia's new prime minister following the election, and the SPO was often critical of his government. In November 2001, Čotrić accused Đinđić of misinforming the public about the results of a recent diplomatic trip to the United States of America.

Čotrić was a deputy leader of Vuk Drašković's campaign for the presidency of Serbia in the inconclusive September–October 2002 election. He was later appointed as chair of the SPO's executive council.

The SPO formed an alliance with New Serbia for the 2003 parliamentary election and re-entered the assembly when the list won twenty-two mandates. Čotrić received the twenty-eighth position on the coalition's list and was not initially included in the SPO's assembly delegation. (From 2000 to 2011, parliamentary mandates were awarded to sponsoring parties or coalitions rather than to individual candidates, and it was common practice for the mandates to be distributed out of numerical order. Čotrić could have been awarded a mandate despite his comparatively low position, but he was not.) He was, however, appointed to the assembly on 12 February 2004, as the replacement for a delegate who had resigned to take a position in the federal Assembly of Serbia and Montenegro.

His return to the national assembly was ultimately brief. Vojislav Koštunica became Serbia's prime minister after the 2003 election and formed a new coalition government that included the SPO. Čotrić was appointed as a state secretary in the ministry for the Serbian diaspora and resigned his assembly seat on 16 March 2004. He remained a state secretary until 2007, working with minister and fellow SPO representative Vojislav Vukčević. In July 2004, he met with Croatian state secretary for political affairs Hidajet Biščević to discuss the status of ethnic minorities in both countries; he also met with representatives of Serbs in Croatia on the same issue. In September 2004, he said that Serbs in Hungary were facing increasing levels of intimidation and called on the Hungarian government to punish those responsible.

In his capacity as a government secretary, Čotrić subsequently met with officials from the Republic of Macedonia on the status of Serbs in that country, supported an effort by Serbs in Austria to gain official national minority status, and proposed opening a ministry of diaspora office in Novi Pazar that would operate in conjunction with the area's religious communities. On leaving office, he said that the SPO would not agree to the separation of Kosovo from Serbia.

After 2000, a system of proportional representation was introduced for local elections in Serbia. Čotrić appeared in the seventh position on the SPO's list for the City of Belgrade assembly in the 2004 local elections. The list did not cross the electoral threshold.

In July 2006, Čotrić attended the unveiling of a statue of Draža Mihailović in Lapovo. In a speech to the assembled crowd, he said that Mihailović was the first leader to rise against the Axis occupation of Serbia in World War II and expressed hope that monuments in honour of Mihailović would be erected throughout Serbia. He later argued for the antifascist credentials of Chetnik fighters during the war.

==== Since 2007 ====
The SPO contested the 2007 parliamentary election on its own and once again failed to cross the electoral threshold. For the 2008 election, the SPO joined the For a European Serbia list led by the Democratic Party under Boris Tadić. Čotrić received the 245th position on the list (which was mostly arranged in alphabetical order) and was again chosen to enter parliament as part of the SPO delegation.

Serbia's electoral system was reformed again in 2011, such that assembly mandates were awarded in numerical order to candidates on successful lists. For the 2012 parliamentary election, the SPO joined a coalition called Preokret, alternately known in English as Turnover or U-Turn. Čotrić received the eighth position on the coalition's list and was elected when the alliance won nineteen seats. He chaired the parliamentary committee on the Serb diaspora in this convocation of parliament, and shortly before the 2014 election he argued that five seats in the National Assembly should be set aside for voters in the diaspora.

The SPO contested the 2014 election as part of the Serbian Progressive Party's Aleksandar Vučić — Future We Believe In electoral list. Čotrić received the forty-first position on the list and was easily returned when the Progressive-led alliance won a majority with 158 out of 250 mandates. In December 2014, he took part in a parliamentary delegation to Albania that was focused on business co-operation and the status of the Serb minority in the country.

For the 2016 election, Čotrić received the ninety-eighth position on the Progressive Party's successor Aleksandar Vučić – Serbia Is Winning list and was re-elected when the alliance won 131 seats. During the 2016–20 parliament, Čotrić was the leader of the committee on Kosovo-Metohija; a member of the committee on the diaspora and Serbs in the region; a deputy member of the culture and information committee; the head of Serbia's delegation to the Interparliamentary Assembly on Orthodoxy (a position he also held in previous parliaments); the head of the parliamentary friendship group with Armenia, and a member of the parliamentary friendship groups with Albania, Austria, Bosnia and Herzegovina, Croatia, Montenegro, North Macedonia, Romania, Russia, Slovenia, and Turkey. The SPO members in the National Assembly serve in the Progressive Party's parliamentary group.

In 2019, Čotrić proposed the construction of a Triumphal Arch to commemorate Serbia's victories in the Balkan Wars of 1912–13 and in World War I.

He received the eighty-second position on the Progressive Party's Aleksandar Vučić — For Our Children coalition list in the 2020 Serbian parliamentary election and was elected to an eighth term when the list won a landslide majority with 188 mandates. He is now a member of the culture and information committee and the committee on the diaspora and Serbs in the region, continues to serve in Serbia's delegation to the Interparliamentary Assembly on Orthodoxy and lead the parliamentary friendship group with Armenia, and is a member of the friendship groups with Bulgaria, Croatia, the Czech Republic, North Macedonia, Romania, Slovakia, and Slovenia.

== Electoral record ==
=== Municipal (City Assembly of Belgrade) ===
2000 City of Belgrade election Palilula Division IV
| Dragoljub Anastasovski | Serbian Radical Party | |
| Zoran Luković | Democratic Opposition of Serbia | elected |
| Dragoslav Pavlović | United Pensioners Party | |
| Danilo Pantović | Socialist Party of Serbia–Yugoslav Left | |
| Aleksandar Čotrić | Serbian Renewal Movement | |
