= Žeravice =

Žeravice may refer to places:

- Žeravice, Han Pijesak, Bosnia and Herzegovina
- Žeravice, Olovo, Bosnia and Herzegovina
- Žeravice (Hodonín District), Czech Republic

== See also ==
- Žeravica
