= Slavka Drašković =

Slavka Drašković was a Director of the Office for Cooperation with the Diaspora and Serbs in the Region, in the Government of the Republic of Serbia.

Before taking the post as office director, she was the head of the Serbian Unity Congress, Serbia. Drašković teaches Leadership in Organization at the University School of Business English (Cambridge Associate Partner for Serbia) and Case System Safety and Disasters (Heriot-Watt University). She has extensive experience in management positions and expertise in the field of leadership and system security.

== Biography ==
Slavka Drašković was born in Niš. She attended elementary and high school in Belgrade where she also obtained her BA from the Faculty of Economics. She received her M.A. from the Faculty of Philosophy, Department of Ethnology and Anthropology on the topic of pedagogy and anthropology of women. At the same university, she also received her PhD on the topic of business leaders of the Serbian diaspora in the United States. She also attended a specialization course in the field of business leadership (Coach Training Alliance, USA).

Drašković is married and has two children.

== Career ==
Since 1990, Drašković worked as a director of the Serbian diaspora organization "Serbian Unity Congress", and from 2002 to 2008 she acted as executive director of the same organization in the US. Since 2008, she was the president of the Serbian Unity Congress Serbia, the local diaspora organization based in Serbia and dealing with programs of the Serbian diaspora in the US, Russia, Germany, Austria, Canada and others. From 1995 to 2012, she was the director of Studenica Foundation USA, the foundation of the Serbian diaspora engaged in providing scholarships to Serbian students. From 2008 to 2012 she also worked as executive director of the Business Leadership Ltd. Belgrade. From 1987 to 1989 she was the director of financial engineering at MCS Ltd, and from 1990 to 1999 she was the partner and director at Saba Business Centre Ltd. From 1986 to 1987 she was engaged at Minel CESA and Minel as the senior export associate.

She is a member of the Board of Directors of the Council for the Renewal of Endowments, and a board member of the Association of Serbian Inventors, and of the Marko Jaric Fund. She is a member of the Advisory Board of the Red Star Belgrade rowing club, as well as the leader of the Serbian - U.S. Women Leadership Network and a member of the Women Expert Base. She also holds membership in CTA Coaches&Mentors Community, as well as in the Serbian American Professionals, and the European Economic Forum (EREF).

On 2 November 2012, the Government of the Republic of Serbia appointed Drašković to the post of Director of the Office for Cooperation with the Diaspora and Serbs in the region. She is not a member of any political party, and was nominated for a position of director, as an independent expert, by the Serbian Progressive Party.

== Work with the diaspora ==
Drašković has more than two decades of extensive experience in working with the Serbian diaspora. She has organized numerous conferences, lectures and events for high-level delegations of the Serbian diaspora in Chicago, Cleveland, Moscow, Vienna, Graz, Washington, and New York.

Drašković was one of the most persistent lobbyists for the establishment of the Ministry of Diaspora, for which she advocated with more than 20 other organizations from the diaspora. She was one of the initiators of the Round Table, which led to the adoption of the Law on the Diaspora of the Republic of Serbia. She was also the member of the Commission who prepared the Strategy for the Diaspora of the Republic of Serbia. Drašković was an associate member of the intergovernmental working group of the Ministry of Diaspora, Ministry of Foreign Affairs and the Ministry of Interior to improve the relations between Serbia and the states of Illinois, Ohio and California.

Drašković is one of the most active proponents of diaspora involvement in helping local communities through projects related to small and medium-sized enterprises (SMEs) - Home Town Association project. She has advocated for the strengthening of Serbia through the development of the SME sector, and organized the participation of Serbian SMEs at various fairs and economic forums in the United States and Russia.

She is the founder and was the long-time director of several diaspora organizations: Serbian Unity Congress, Serbian Unity Congress Serbia, Marko Jaric Fund, and Studenica Foundation. She was the leader of numerous projects of the Serbian diaspora, including:

- Choose success, the program for Belgrade University students
- Leadership and Development including Diaspora
- Alumni Organization of Belgrade University
- EU TEMPUS project interface, expert from Serbia in the Serbian diaspora experience transfer.
- Serbian American Women Leadership Network Project
- Studenica Foundation, the leader of scholarships and educational grants in Serbia, Republic of Srpska, Croatia, and many others

== Publications ==
- Draskovic, Slavka, 2012, Narratives of success and national culture dimensions: Serbia and the USA, Belgrade. Journal of the Ethnographic Institute Serbian Academy of Science (SANU) ISSN 0350-0861, Volume: 60, Issue: 2, Start page: 43;
- Przulj, Z, S.Draskovic, 2012. Myths, culture and success in business: A case of US and Serbian cultures. African Journal of Business Management Vol.6 (1), pp. XXX-XXX, ISSN 1993-8233 © 2012 Academic Journals
- Draskovic, Slavka, 2011. The key to success, the road to wealth and personal development. Belgrade. Andrejevic Foundation
- Draskovic, Slavka, 2011. Distant learning as part of a new paradigm of economic and social development. Faculty of Philology. Belgrade
- Draskovic, Slavka. 2010. Narratives About the Success of Business Leaders of the Serbian diaspora in America. Faculty of Philosophy, Belgrade
- Draskovic, Slavka, 2004. Early Education as Part of Cultural Transmission, Faculty of Philosophy, Belgrade
- Draskovic Slavka Ilic Ljubinko, 2009. Innovation and Energy Efficiency, Ed. Bulatovic, M., M. Janjic. Mechanical Engineering Faculty, Podgorica. Page: 24-26
- Ilic, Lj., S. Draskovic, J. Micic, A. Milanovic, 2009. Fighting Natural Disasters through Innovations, Ed. Biočanin R., J. Aleksic, A.Vidović. ICAM Banja Luka
- Cited at: Kostov, A., M. Ljubojev (Ed.) 2009. "International October Conference on Mining and Metallurgy". Kladovo. Work Draskovic S., Lj. Ilic 2009 Energy Efficiency and Innovation

== Awards and acknowledgements ==
In her several-decades-long engagement with the Serbian diaspora, Drašković received:

- Medal and the golden pin of the Educational Community of the Republic of Serbia
- Order of the Russian diaspora Zemjačestvo
- Diploma of the American diaspora Serbian Unity Congress
- Award of the Association of Inventors of Serbia in 2009 for her contribution to the culture of innovation and strengthening cooperation with the diaspora
- Drašković's biographical information was mentioned at the "Biographical Lexicon; Serbs in the World." Belgrade - Los Angeles, 1999.
