= Srđan Srećković =

Serbian politician

- Срђан Срећковић
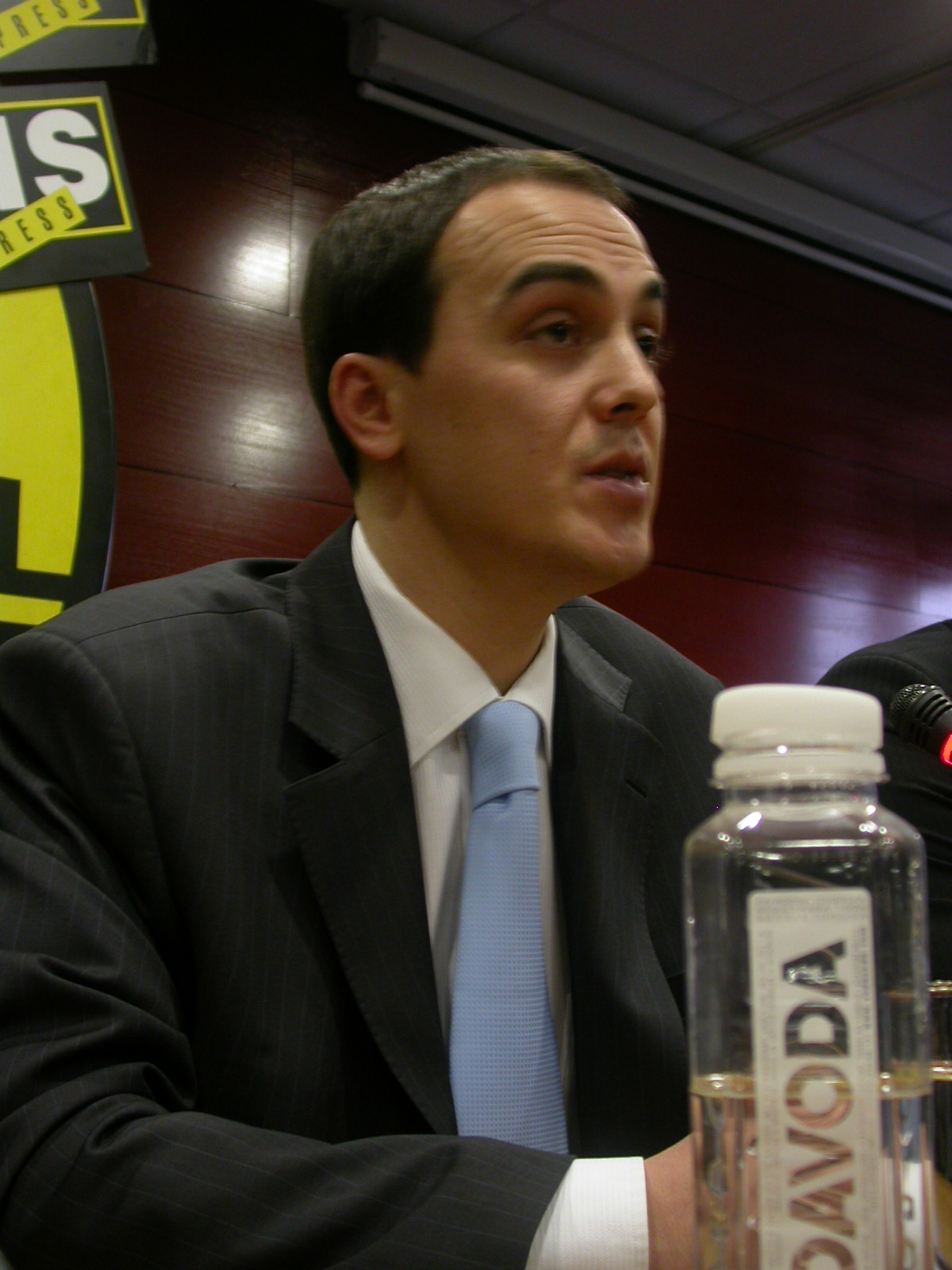

Minister of Religion and Diaspora
- In office 14 March 2011 – 27 July 2012
- Preceded by: Himself; Bogoljub Šijaković (Religion)
- Succeeded by: Post abolished

Minister of Diaspora
- In office 7 July 2008 – 14 March 2011
- Preceded by: Milica Čubrilo
- Succeeded by: Himself

Personal details
- Born: 12 April 1974 (age 52) Belgrade, Serbia, SFR Yugoslavia
- Party: SPO (1992–2012); ISPO (2012–2013); ZZS (2013–2020); SSP (2020–)
- Education: University of Belgrade
- Occupation: Politician
- Profession: Msc Economist

Srđan Srećković (Serbian Cyrillic: Срђан Срећковић; born 12 April 1974) is a Serbian politician. He served as the Minister of Diaspora from 2008 to 2011, as the Minister of Religion and Diaspora from 2011 to 2012 and as Deputy Minister for trade, tourism and services from 2004 to 2007.

During his term as the Minister of Religion and Diaspora, the first Law on Diaspora and Serbs in the Region was adopted, the Assembly of Diaspora and Serbs in the Region was constituted, along with the Council for Serbs in the Region, and the Serbian Government's Strategy for the improvement of relations with the diaspora and Serbs in the region was adopted.

== Education and career ==
Srećković was born on 12 April 1974, in Belgrade. He was awarded his Bachelor and master's degrees at the Faculty of Economics of the University of Belgrade.

In his career, Srecković held the position of the Deputy Director-General (CEO) of aircompany JAT Airways from 2007 through 2008, and he also served as the Deputy Minister of Trade, Tourism and Services in the Government of the Republic of Serbia from 2004 through 2007. During this time, he was the head of the working group for drafting and adopting the Law on Trade, Law on Prices, Law on Consumer Protection, Law Public Advertising, and Law on Competition Protection.

He was a member of the Serbian Renewal Movement (SPO) from 1992 through 2012. He served as the party's vice president from 2005 through 2012, and before that he was the director and a member of the presidency, as well as a member of the executive and governing Boards. He founded the Original Serbian Renewal Movement on 10 February 2012, and he was the party's head up until the collective joining of the Together for Serbia party (ZZS), on 1 November 2013. He then became the party's vice-president.

In February 2020, the opposition coalition the ZZS belonged to, the Alliance for Serbia (SZS), decided to boycott the elections at all government levels. The ZZS however made the decision to participate in the local elections in Sabac, thus withdrawing from the Alliance. Sreckovic characterized that decision as destroying the unity of the democratic opposition, he voted against that decision and left the party.

In March 2020, he became a member of the Presidency of the Party of Freedom and Justice (SSP).

== Personal life ==
He is married and speaks English.

Preceded by Milica Čubrilo	Minister of Diaspora; 2008–2011	Succeeded by Himself
Preceded by Himself; Bogoljub Šijaković (Religion)	Minister of Religion and Diaspora; 2011–2012	Succeeded by Post abolished
