= Radovan Pankov =

Radovan Pankov may refer to:

- Radovan Pankov (footballer)
- Radovan Pankov (politician)
