= Žeravica =

Žeravica may refer to:

- Žeravica, Gradiška, a village in Bosnia and Herzegovina
- Žeravica (surname), a South Slavic surname
