= Radomir Naumov =

Serbian politician (1946–2015)

- Радомир Наумов
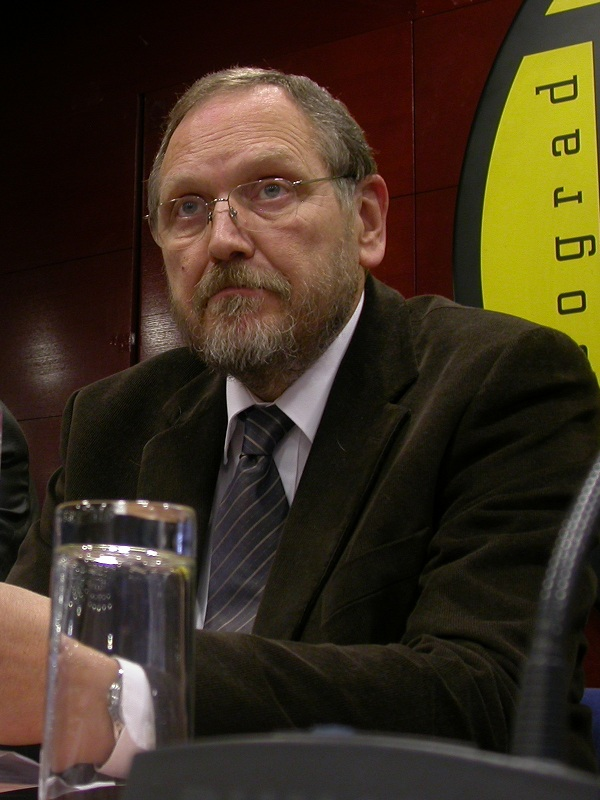
- Naumov in September 2007

Minister of Religion
- In office 15 May 2007 – 7 July 2008
- Preceded by: Milan Radulović
- Succeeded by: Bogoljub Šijaković

Minister of Mining and Energy
- In office 3 March 2004 – 15 May 2007
- Preceded by: Kori Udovički
- Succeeded by: Aleksandar Popović

Personal details
- Born: 12 May 1946 Čoka
- Died: 22 May 2015 (aged 68) Belgrade
- Spouse: Marija
- Education: University of Belgrade Faculty of Electrical Engineering
- Alma mater: University of Belgrade
- Occupation: Politician
- Profession: Engineer

Radomir Naumov (Serbian: Радомир Наумов; 12 May 1946 – 22 May 2015) was a Serbian politician and engineer. He served as the Minister of Religion from 2007 to 2008, and as the Minister of Mining and Energy from 2004 to 2007.

Naumov graduated from the University of Belgrade Faculty of Electrical Engineering. He worked at the Nikola Tesla Electrical Engineering Institute for many years. Naumov was president of Belgrade office of the Democratic Party of Serbia. He was married with two children.

Government offices
Preceded by Kori Udovički	Minister of Mining and Energy; 2004 – 2007	Succeeded by Aleksandar Popović
Preceded by Milan Radulović	Minister of Religion; 2007 – 2008	Succeeded by Bogoljub Šijaković
