= Japaga =

Japaga may refer to:

- Japaga, Bosnia and Herzegovina, a village near Han Pijesak
- Japaga, Croatia, a village near Lipik
