= Ministry of Religion and Diaspora (Serbia) =

- Министарство вера и дијаспоре Ministarstvo vera i dijasopre

Ministry overview
- Formed: 11 February 1991
- Dissolved: 27 July 2012
- Superseding Ministry: Ministry of Culture and Information
- Jurisdiction: Government of Serbia

The Ministry of Religion and Diaspora (Serbian: Министарство вера и дијаспоре / Ministarstvo vera i dijasopre) was the ministry in the Government of Serbia which was in charge of connection with the Serbian diaspora. The ministry was merged into the Ministry of Culture and Information on 27 July 2012.

== History ==
The ministry was established on 11 February 1991. It was abolished from 2001 to 2004. The Ministry of Religion which existed from 1991 to 2011, merged into the ministry in 2011.

The Ministry of Religion and Diaspora was later merged into the Ministry of Culture and Information on 27 July 2012. Also, the Directorate for Cooperation with the Diaspora and Serbs in the Region and Office for Cooperation with Churches and Religious Communities were established on 2 August 2012 and took some of the Ministry's jurisdictions.

== List of ministers ==
Political Party: SPS SRS SPO DS n-p

Name (Birth–Death)	Party	Term of Office		Prime Minister (Cabinet)
Minister of Relations with Serbs outside of Serbia
Stanko Cvijan (born 1951)	SPS	11 February 1991	10 February 1993	Zelenović (I); Božović (I)
Bogoljub Bjelica (1956–2013)	SPS	10 February 1993	18 March 1994	Šainović (I)
Radovan Pankov (1946–2024)	SPS	18 March 1994	24 March 1998	Marjanović (I)
Milorad Mirčić (1956–2025)	SRS	24 March 1998	24 October 2000	Marjanović (II)
Vojislav Vukčević (1938–2016)	SPO	24 October 2000	25 January 2001	Minić (transitional)
Minister of Diaspora
Vojislav Vukčević (1938–2016)	SPO	3 March 2004	15 May 2007	Koštunica (I)
Milica Čubrilo (born 1969)	DS	15 May 2007	7 July 2008	Koštunica (II)
Srđan Srećković (born 1974)	SPO	7 July 2008	14 March 2011	Cvetković (I)
Minister of Religion and Diaspora
Srđan Srećković (born 1974)	SPO	14 March 2011	27 July 2012	Cvetković (I)
Srđan Srećković (born 1974)	n-p (Note: Expelled from the SPO on 10 February 2012.)	14 March 2011	27 July 2012	Cvetković (I)
