= Milan Radulović =

Serbian politician (1948–2017)

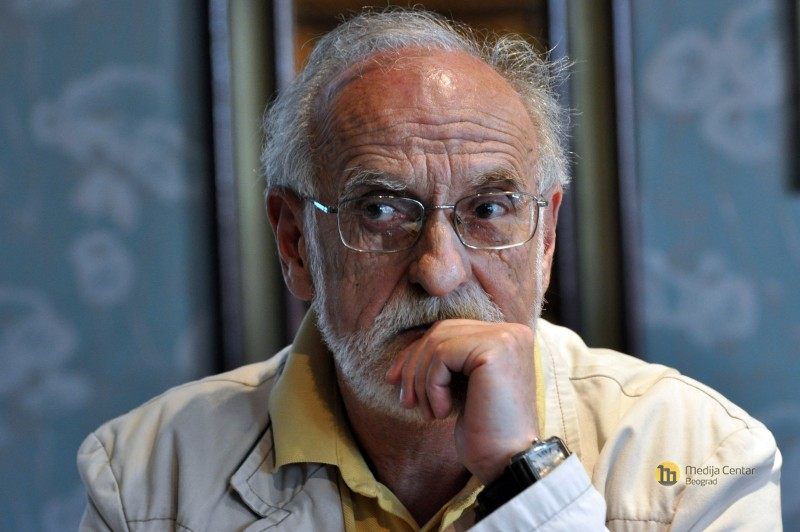

Minister of Religion
- In office 3 March 2004 – 15 May 2007
- Preceded by: Vojislav Milovanovic
- Succeeded by: Radomir Naumov

Personal details
- Born: 13 August 1948 Malo Polje, PR Bosnia and Herzegovina, FPR Yugoslavia
- Died: 29 October 2017 (aged 69) Belgrade, Serbia
- Party: Democratic Party of Serbia
- Education: University of Belgrade

Milan Radulović (Serbian Cyrillic: Милан Радуловић, 13 August 1948 – 29 October 2017) was a Serbian politician, Professor and literary critic. He served as the Minister of Religion from 2004 to 2007. He died in Belgrade on 29 October 2017.

== Career ==
Radulović was born in 1948 in Malo Polje near Han Pijesak). He graduated from the University of Sarajevo Faculty of Philosophy and later received his MA and PhD from the University of Belgrade Faculty of Philology. He had worked at the Belgrade Institute for Literature and Arts between 1974 and 2015 focusing on Serbian literary modernism.

He served as the Minister of Religion from 2004 to 2007 in the first cabinet of Vojislav Koštunica.

Preceded by Vojislav Milovanović	Minister of Religion of Serbia; 2004–2007	Succeeded by Radomir Naumov
