= Žeravica (surname) =

Žeravica (Serbian Cyrillic: Жеравица) is a Serbo-Croatian surname, meaning "ember" or "live coal". It may refer to:

- Miloš Žeravica (born 1988), Serbian footballer
- Ranko Žeravica (born 1929), retired Serbian basketball coach
- Miro Žeravica (born 1972), retired Croatian swimmer
- Grujica Žeravica (fl. 1665–69), hajduk

== See also ==
- Žeravica, Gradiška, a village in Bosnia and Herzegovina
- Žerevice, place name
