= Milica Čubrilo =

Serbian politician

Milica Čubrilo-Filipović
- Милица Чубрило-Филиповић

Serbian Ambassador to Tunisia
- In office 26 May 2010 – 7 November 2013

Minister of Diaspora
- In office 15 May 2007 – 7 July 2008
- Preceded by: Vojislav Vukčević
- Succeeded by: Srđan Srećković

Personal details
- Born: 29 December 1969 (age 56) Carthage, Tunisia
- Party: Democratic Party
- Education: Panthéon-Assas University; Sorbonne University
- Occupation: Politician, diplomat

Milica Čubrilo - Filipović (Serbian Cyrillic: Милица Чубрило - Филиповић) is a Serbian politician and diplomat. She served as the Minister of Diaspora from 2007 to 2008. In May 2010, she was appointed Serbian Ambassador to Tunisia, and held the position until November 2013.

== Education and career ==
She was born in Carthage, Tunisia in 1969. She graduated in 1992 at the Law School of Panthéon-Assas University. In 1993, she received her MA degree in Anthropology and Law at the Sorbonne.

In 2007, prior to taking the post of the Ministry of Diaspora, she worked as a coordinator of the world congress of the International Press Institute (IPI), scheduled to take place in Belgrade in June 2008. In 2006, she was a consultant for the USAID Regional Competitiveness Initiative, on the strategy and promotion of tourism in the Balkans. From 2003 to 2006, she was the director of the Tourist Organisation of Serbia (TOS). She was in charge of promoting Serbia as a tourist destination, as well as coordinating 80 tourist local organisations in Serbia. During her term, Serbia was featured in over 300 media worldwide, and promoted in all major tourist fairs. As a result, in three years, the number of foreign visitors went up by 60% and the income from the tourist industry was 7 times higher. In 2005, Lonely Planet voted Serbia one of the ten most interesting destinations in the world. From 2001 to 2003, she worked as a correspondent for Le Figaro, La Croix, Radio France Internationale.

From 1996 to 2000, she was active in the field of tourism and organisation of cultural and sports events worldwide. She is fluent in French and English and has a working knowledge of Italian and Spanish.

Government offices
Preceded by Vojislav Vukčević	Minister of Diaspora; 2007–2008	Succeeded by Srđan Srećković
