= Philotheos (journal) =

- Discipline: Philosophy, Theology
- Language: English, French, German, Greek, Serbian, Russian
- Edited by: Bogoljub Šijaković

Publication details
- History: 2001–present
- Publisher: Gnomon Center for the Humanities, Belgrade (Serbia)
- Frequency: Annually

Standard abbreviations
- ISO 4: Philotheos

Indexing
- ISSN: 1451-3455 (print); 2620-0163 (web)
- LCCN: 2005234070
- OCLC no.: 441784701

Links
- Journal homepage

Philotheos (ΦΙΛΟΘΕΟΣ) is an international scholarly journal that provides a forum for a dialogue in philosophy and in theology respectively, with a special focus on the dialogue between the two. Founded in 2001, it brings together articles and book reviews of philosophical and theological interest in the broader Christian tradition. Bogoljub Šijaković, professor of philosophy at the University of Belgrade, is the founding editor-in-chief of the journal. Contributions are published in several European languages and they cover diverse field of inquiry from antiquity to the present. The overarching goal is to overcome the disciplinarian entrenchments in philosophy and theology and reintegrate professional questions with the need to answer to problems placed before us by life itself.

From 2001 to 2017 Philotheos appeared in one annual volume. As of volume 18 onwards, the journal publishes two issues per year, the first in May and the second in September, both in electronic and print formats. Online access to Philotheos is provided by the Philosophy Documentation Center. It is indexed in the ATLA Religion Database, Gnomon Bibliographische Datenbank and L'Année philologique, among others.

Philotheos is published by the Gnomon Center for the Humanities in Belgrade, in cooperation with the Sebastian Press in Los Angeles and the Center for Philosophy and Theology in Trebinje.
