= Directorate for cooperation with churches and religious communities (Serbia) =

- Управа за сарадњу с црквама и верским заједницама

Directorate overview
- Formed: 2 August 2012
- Preceding Directorate: Ministry of Religion and Diaspora
- Type: Directorate
- Headquarters: Palace of Serbia, Bulevar Mihajla Pupina 2, Belgrade
- Directorate executive: Vladimir Roganović, Director
- Parent Directorate: Ministry of Justice
- Website: vere.gov.rs

The Directorate for cooperation with churches and religious communities (Serbian: Управа за сарадњу с црквама и верским заједницама, romanized: Uprava za saradnju s crkvama i verskim zajednicama) is a directorate of the Ministry of Justice of the Serbia. It was established in 2012 as separate state body.

== Organization ==
The director is in charge of the Direcorate and is appointed by the Government of Serbia. The mandate of the director is 5 years.

== Responsibilities ==
The jurisdiction of the Directorate is established by its founding statute:

- Affirmation and improvement of freedom of religion
- Cooperation of the state with churches and religious communities and improvement of their position within society
- Affirmation of religious elements in Serbian national identity
- Assistance in protection and preservation of religious elements in national identity of minorities in Serbia
- Cooperation of the state with dioceses based abroad
- Affirmation and development of religious culture
- Assistance in development of religious education
- Assistance in religious construction and preservation of religious cultural heretege
- Providing assistance in improvement of material and social position and status of churches and religious communities
