= Babine Gornje =

- Village
- Location within Bosnia and Herzegovina
- Coordinates: 44°05′38″N 18°48′40″E
- Country: Bosnia and Herzegovina
- Entity: Republika Srpska
- Municipality: Han Pijesak
- Time zone: UTC+1 (CET)
  - Summer (DST): UTC+2 (CEST)

Babine Gornje (Cyrillic: Бабине Горње) is a village in the Republika Srpska, Bosnia and Herzegovina, located in the municipality of Han Pijesak. According to the 2013 census, the village has a population of 12 people and an ethnic Serb majority.

Ethnic Composition
	1991	2013
Total	34	12
Serbs	33 (97.1%)	11 (91.7%)
Croats	1 (2.9%)	1 (8.3%)
