= Bogoljub Bjelica =

Serbian politician

Bogoljub Bjelica (Serbian Cyrillic: Богољуб Бјелица; 26 September 1956 – 28 March 2013) was a Serbian politician. He was briefly the mayor of Pančevo in 1993, served as minister of relations with Serbs outside of Serbia in the Serbian government from 1993 to 1994, and held a series of other government roles in the late 1990s.

Bjelica was a close associate of Slobodan Milošević between 2000 and 2006. Milošević's decision to appoint Bjelica to a leadership position in the Socialist Party of Serbia (SPS) in 2002 prompted a backlash and ultimately weakened Milošević's hold on the party.

== Early life and career ==
Bjelica was born in Vrbas, in what was then the Autonomous Province of Vojvodina in the People's Republic of Serbia, Federal People's Republic of Yugoslavia. By background, he was a Montenegrin Serb. He received a Bachelor of Laws degree and worked as a lawyer in Pančevo.

== Politician ==
=== Mayor of Pančevo ===
In 1990, Serbia transitioned from a one-party socialist state to a (nominally) multi-party democracy. The Socialist Party was the dominant political force in the country for the next decade under Milošević's authoritarian leadership.

Bjelica was a founding member of the Socialist Party in Pančevo. He was elected to the city assembly in the May 1992 Serbian local elections and, when the assembly convened, was chosen as its vice-president, a position that was then equivalent to deputy mayor. In October 1992, he also became president of Pančevo's operational headquarters for the care of refugees, in the context of the ongoing Yugoslav Wars.

Blejica appeared in the twelfth position on the Socialist Party's electoral list for the Zrenjanin division (which included Pančevo) in the 1992 Serbian parliamentary election. The list won eight seats, and he was not chosen for a mandate. (From 1992 to 2000, Serbia's electoral law stipulated that one-third of parliamentary mandates would be assigned to candidates from successful lists in numerical order, while the remaining two-thirds would be distributed amongst other candidates at the discretion of the sponsoring parties. Bjelica could have been given a mandate despite his list position, although in the event he was not.)

He was re-elected to the Pančevo assembly in the December 1992 local elections, which took place concurrently with the parliamentary vote, and was chosen afterward as assembly president, equivalent to mayor. His term in office was very brief; he resigned in March 1993 after being appointed as a minister in the Serbian government, although he continued to serve as a member of the local assembly.

In September 1993, Nada Kirbus, president of the Pančevo assembly's executive committee and a fellow Socialist Party member, accused Bjelica and other prominent local officials of improper financial activities, noting specifically that Bjelica had taken 660,000 lira for an official trip to Italy without any proper documentation. Kirbus's charges provoked a reaction from hardline elements in the party, and she was removed from office on 14 September 1993.

=== Minister ===
On 10 February 1993, Bjelica was appointed to the government of Nikola Šainović as minister of relations with Serbs outside Serbia. In late April 1993, he announced an extension of the deadline for refugees to register their status with the government. In an interview from this period, he said that he was working to distribute the territorial presence of the war refugees in Serbia more evenly, arguing there was no justification for their concentration in large cities. He also noted that his government was working to help facilitate the return of conscripts to the armies of the Republika Srpska and the Republika Srpska Krajina.

Bjelica travelled to Timișoara in April 1993 for a meeting of Romania's Democratic Alliance of Serbs and Karashevs. In September 1993, he travelled to Düsseldorf at the invitation of Germany's Council of the Federation of Serbian Humanitarian and Cultural Associations.

A new ministry took office under Mirko Marjanović on 18 March 1994. Bjelica was not included in the new cabinet.

=== Deputy Minister of Defence and after ===
Bjelica was appointed as deputy minister of defence in the government of the Federal Republic of Yugoslavia in October 1994, serving under defence minister Pavle Bulatović. In February 1995, he and Lieutenant-General Blagoje Kovačević travelled to Užice to discuss the combat readiness of the Yugoslav Army's Užice Corps. Two months later, he was part of a delegation that oversaw tactical exercises of the army outside Klina in Kosovo and Metohija. On 27 June 1995, he attended the unveiling of a statue of Stefan Dušan in Prizren. He stood down as deputy minister in June 1996.

During the NATO bombing of Yugoslavia in 1999, Bjelica served as deputy head of the directorate for the morale of the Yugoslav Army.

=== Socialist Party official, Milošević associate ===
Bjelica was elected as a member of the Socialist Party's main board in February 2000 and also served as president of the party's municipal board for the Belgrade municipality of Stari Grad.

Slobodan Milošević was defeated in the 2000 Yugoslavian presidential election and fell from power on 5 October 2000. Bjelica became a close associate of the former president shortly thereafter, serving in Milošević's private security detail at his family compound and providing him with information about developments within the Socialist Party. There were discussions in this period about Bjelica becoming leader of the Socialist Party's organization for Belgrade, though ultimately this did not happen.

Milošević was arrested on 1 April 2000, giving himself up to Serbian authorities following an extended standoff. Bjelica was also arrested at the same time on the charge of obstructing an official in the performance of their duties during Milošević's arrest; he went on an extended hunger strike while in detention and was later released from custody. (The court proceedings against Bjelica lasted for several years before reaching a standstill in the early 2010s, due to his declining health.) As per Milošević's request, Bjelica was part of a Socialist Party delegation that visited him in detention in The Hague on 14 August 2001.

Due to what he perceived as the inaction of the Socialist Party leadership, Milošević appointed Bjelica as head of the Sloboda (English: Freedom) association, which called for his immediate release from detention at the International Criminal Tribunal for the Former Yugoslavia (ICTY). On a number of occasions, Bjelica argued that Milošević's health was deteriorating and that he was receiving inadequate treatment.

Milošević appointed Bjelica as the Socialist Party's president in his absence in late August 2002, replacing Mirko Marjanović in the role. He also appointed Bjelica as chair of the party's organizational and political committee. Bjelica's sudden rise was met with opposition from many within the Socialist Party's organization, where he was not well known and had little independent support. In the September–October 2002 Serbian presidential election, Bjelica followed Milošević's wishes and endorsed Serbian Radical Party leader Vojislav Šešelj over the Socialist Party's official candidate, Bata Živojinović, who had been chosen by the party leadership in Serbia.

The Socialist Party held its sixth congress in January 2003, against Milošević's wishes. At the meeting, Bjelica attempted to read a message from Milošević that described many of the party's leading figures in Serbia, including Ivica Dačić, as "traitors and fifth columnists" who were cooperating with the Democratic Opposition of Serbia (DOS) government while pretending to be in opposition. Bjelica was shouted down by the assembled delegates and was unable to finish the document. He and forty of his followers walked out of the congress, which proceeded to elect Dačić as the party's new leader in Milošević's absence and to reduce Milošević's practical authority over the party organization.

Although Bjelica became permanently estranged from the Socialist Party's leadership in Serbia after the sixth congress, he did not initially leave the party and in fact appeared on its electoral list for the 2003 Serbian parliamentary election, in the twenty-seventh position. (By this time, Serbia's electoral laws had been reformed such that the country was a single at-large division and all mandates were awarded to candidates on successful lists at the discretion of the sponsoring parties, irrespective of numerical order.) The Socialists won twenty-two seats, and he was not given a mandate.

After Slobodan Milošević's death on 11 March 2006, Bjelica was one of his four coffin-bearers, along with Milorad Vučelić, Uroš Šuvaković, and Milutin Mrkonjić.

=== Socialist Freedom Party ===
In June 2007, Bjelica oversaw the transformation of the Sloboda organization into the Socialist Freedom Party (Socijalistička partija Slobode, SPS), serving as its president. The party attempted to field a list of candidates in the 2008 Serbian parliamentary election, but its list was rejected by the republican election commission. The party fielded some candidates in the concurrent 2008 Serbian local elections, winning few votes and no seats, and was de-registered shortly thereafter.

== Death ==
Bjelica died on 28 March 2013, following an extended illness.
