= Potkozlovača =

- Village
- Location within Bosnia and Herzegovina
- Coordinates: 44°08′33″N 18°51′20″E
- Country: Bosnia and Herzegovina
- Entity: Republika Srpska
- Municipality: Han Pijesak
- Time zone: UTC+1 (CET)
  - Summer (DST): UTC+2 (CEST)

Potkozlovača (Cyrillic: Подкозловача) is a village in the Republika Srpska, Bosnia and Herzegovina. According to the 1991 census, the village is located in the municipality of Han Pijesak.
