= Rubinići =

Village in Olovo, Bosnia and Herzegovina

- Village
- Location within Bosnia and Herzegovina
- Coordinates: 44°06′43″N 18°46′01″E
- Country: Bosnia and Herzegovina
- Entity: Republika Srpska; Federation of Bosnia and Herzegovina
- Region Canton: Sarajevo; Zenica-Doboj
- Municipality: Han Pijesak; Olovo

Area
  - Total: 4.62 sq mi (11.97 km^{2})

Population (2013)
  - Total: 27
  - Density: 5.8/sq mi (2.3/km^{2})
- Time zone: UTC+1 (CET)
  - Summer (DST): UTC+2 (CEST)

Rubinići is a village in the municipalities of Han Pijesak (Republika Srpska) and Olovo, Bosnia and Herzegovina.

== Demographics ==
According to the 2013 census, its population was 27, all Bosniaks living in the Han Pijesak part with no one living in the Olovo part.
