= Nevačka =

- Village
- Location within Bosnia and Herzegovina
- Coordinates: 44°06′50″N 18°48′29″E
- Country: Bosnia and Herzegovina
- Entity: Republika Srpska
- Municipality: Han Pijesak
- Time zone: UTC+1 (CET)
  - Summer (DST): UTC+2 (CEST)

Nevačka is a village in the Republika Srpska, Bosnia and Herzegovina. According to the 1991 census, the village is located in the municipality of Han Pijesak, and has a population of 334 people.
