= Brložnik =

- Village
- Location within Bosnia and Herzegovina
- Coordinates: 44°01′04″N 19°06′26″E
- Country: Bosnia and Herzegovina
- Entity: Republika Srpska
- Municipality: Han Pijesak
- Time zone: UTC+1 (CET)
  - Summer (DST): UTC+2 (CEST)

Brložnik is a village in the Republika Srpska, Bosnia and Herzegovina. The village is located in the municipality of Han Pijesak. According to the 2013 census, Brložnik has a population of 28.
