= Mrkalji (Han Pijesak) =

Mrkalji Mrkalji
- Village
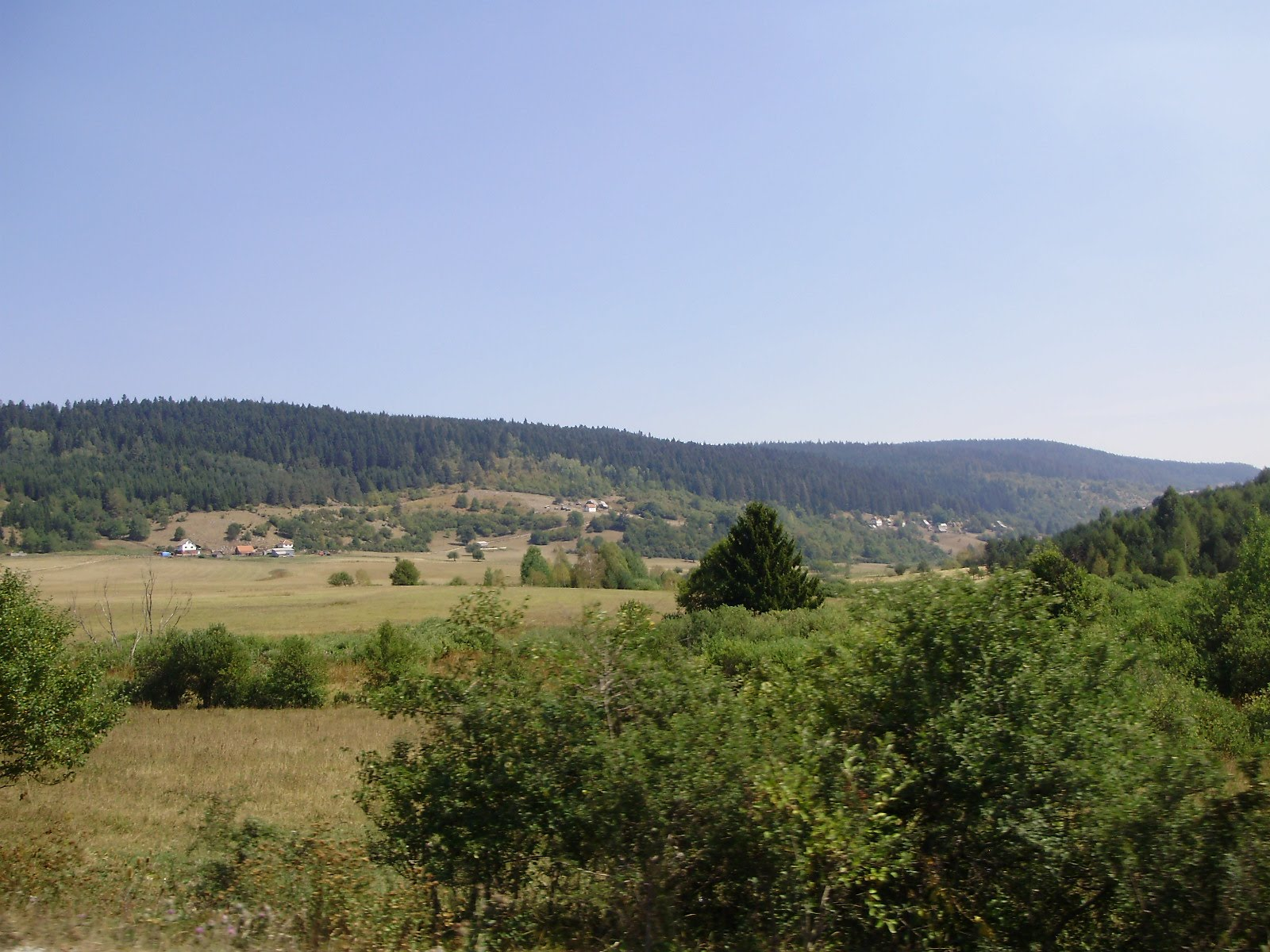

- Location within Bosnia and Herzegovina
- Coordinates: 44°02′43″N 18°55′41″E
- Country: Bosnia and Herzegovina
- Entity: Republika Srpska
- Municipality: Han Pijesak
- Time zone: UTC+1 (CET)
  - Summer (DST): UTC+2 (CEST)

Mrkalji (Cyrillic: Мркаљи) is a village in the Republika Srpska, Bosnia and Herzegovina. The village is located in the municipality of Han Pijesak. According to the 1991 census, the village population was 141.
