= Milenko Babić =

Serbian politician

Milenko Babić (Serbian Cyrillic: Миленко Бабић; born 9 February 1947) is a politician in Serbia. He served in the Assembly of Vojvodina from 2012 to 2016 as a member of the Socialist Party of Serbia.

== Early life and career ==
Babić was born in the village of Vajska in Bač municipality, Autonomous Province of Vojvodina, in what was then the People's Republic of Serbia in the Federal People's Republic of Yugoslavia. He graduated from the University of Novi Sad Faculty of Medicine and specialized in occupational medicine.

== Politician ==
Babić sought election to the National Assembly of Serbia in the 2003 parliamentary election, appearing in the eighth position on the electoral list of Economic Strength of Serbia and the Diaspora. The list did not cross the electoral threshold to win representation in the assembly.

He ran for mayor of Bač in the 2004 Serbian local elections as the candidate of the For the Revival of the Municipality of Bač alliance, which was led by the Socialist Party and also included Economic Strength of Serbia. He lost to Democratic Party candidate Tomislav Bogunović in the second round of voting. He later ran for the Vojvodina provincial assembly in the 2008 provincial election as the Socialist Party candidate in the Bač constituency and finished third.

He ran for the Vojvodina assembly again in the 2012 provincial election and was this time elected, defeating Bogunović in the second round. The Democratic Party and its allies won the election, and Babić served as a member of the opposition. He also appeared in the lead position on the Socialist Party's electoral list in the 2012 local elections and was elected when the list won five mandates. At the municipal level, the Socialists participated in a coalition government led by the Serbian Progressive Party.

Babić did not seek re-election at either the provincial or municipal level in 2016.

== Electoral record ==
=== Assembly of Vojvodina ===
2012 Vojvodina assembly election Bač (constituency seat) – first and second rounds
| Milenko Babić | Socialist Party of Serbia (SPS), Party of United Pensioners of Serbia (PUPS), United Serbia (JS), Social Democratic Party of Serbia (SDP Serbia) (Affiliation: Socialist Party of Serbia) | 2,437 | 31.40 | 4,051 | 54.86 |
| Tomislav Bogunović (incumbent) | Choice for a Better Vojvodina–Bojan Pajtić (Affiliation: Democratic Party) | 2,586 | 33.32 | 3,333 | 45.14 |
| Sava Nićetin | Let's Get Vojvodina Moving–Tomislav Nikolić (Serbian Progressive Party, New Serbia, Movement of Socialists, Strength of Serbia Movement) | 989 | 12.74 | | |
| Stevan Kanja | League of Social Democrats of Vojvodina | 940 | 12.11 | | |
| Marko Zelinčević | Serbian Radical Party | 810 | 10.44 | | |
| Total valid votes | | 7,762 | 100 | 7,384 | 100 |

2008 Vojvodina assembly election Bač (constituency seat) – first and second rounds
| Tomislav Bogunović (incumbent) | For a European Vojvodina Democratic Party–G17 Plus, Boris Tadić (Affiliation: Democratic Party) | 3,909 | 44.55 | 4,375 | 63.42 |
| Darko Jovanović | Serbian Radical Party | 1,943 | 22.44 | 2,523 | 36.58 |
| Milenko Babić | Socialist Party of Serbia (SPS) Party of United Pensioners of Serbia (PUPS) (Affiliation: Socialist Party of Serbia) | 1,595 | 18.18 | | |
| Boško Orlić | Democratic Party of Serbia New Serbia Vojislav Koštunica | 513 | 5.85 | | |
| Štefan Slonka | Together for Vojvodina–Nenad Čanak | 443 | 5.05 | | |
| Darko Vojnović | Liberal Democratic Party | 372 | 4.24 | | |
| Total valid votes | | 8,775 | 100 | 6,898 | 100 |
| Invalid ballots | | 286 | | 190 | |
| Total votes casts | | 9,061 | 66.97 | 7,088 | 52.39 |

=== Municipality of Bač ===
2004 Bač municipal election Mayor of Bač (second round results)'
| Tomislav Bogunović (incumbent) | Democratic Party | 4,212 | 52.97 |
| Milenko Babić | For the Revival of the Municipality of Bač | 3,740 | 47.03 |
| Miloš Vuković | Democratic Party of Serbia | eliminated in first round | |
| Dragan Medić | Serbian Radical Party | eliminated in first round | |
| Pavle Dajić | G17 Plus | eliminated in first round | |
| | | 7,952 | 100 |
