= Berkovina =

- Village
- Location within Bosnia and Herzegovina
- Coordinates: 44°05′12″N 18°52′13″E
- Country: Bosnia and Herzegovina
- Entity: Republika Srpska
- Municipality: Han Pijesak
- Time zone: UTC+1 (CET)
  - Summer (DST): UTC+2 (CEST)

Berkovina (Cyrillic: Берковина) is a village in the municipality of Han Pijesak in the Republika Srpska, Bosnia and Herzegovina. According to the 2013 census, the village has a population of 11, all of them ethnic Serbs.
