= Džimrije =

- Village
- Location within Bosnia and Herzegovina
- Coordinates: 44°00′24″N 18°59′09″E
- Country: Bosnia and Herzegovina
- Entity: Republika Srpska
- Municipality: Han Pijesak
- Time zone: UTC+1 (CET)
  - Summer (DST): UTC+2 (CEST)

Džimrije (Cyrillic: Џимрије) is a village in the Republika Srpska, Bosnia and Herzegovina. According to the 2013 census, the village is located in the municipality of Han Pijesak and has a population of 134 people. It is solely inhabited by ethnic Serbs.

Ethnic Composition
	1991	2013
Total	207	134
Serbs	207	134
Others	0	0
