= Krivače (Han Pijesak) =

- Village
- Location within Bosnia and Herzegovina
- Coordinates: 44°03′43″N 19°03′35″E
- Country: Bosnia and Herzegovina
- Entity: Republika Srpska
- Municipality: Han Pijesak
- Time zone: UTC+1 (CET)
  - Summer (DST): UTC+2 (CEST)

Krivače (Cyrillic: Криваче) is a village in the Republika Srpska, Bosnia and Herzegovina. According to the 1991 census, the village is located in the municipality of Han Pijesak with a population of 248. All but two of the village residents are Muslim.
