= Gođenje =

- Village
- Location within Bosnia and Herzegovina
- Coordinates: 43°59′36″N 19°05′53″E
- Country: Bosnia and Herzegovina
- Entity: Republika Srpska
- Municipality: Han Pijesak
- Time zone: UTC+1 (CET)
  - Summer (DST): UTC+2 (CEST)

Gođenje (Cyrillic: Гођење) is a village in the Republika Srpska, Bosnia and Herzegovina. The village is located in the municipality of Han Pijesak. The population was 580 at the 1991 census, and 78 at the 2013 census.
