= Pjenovac =

- Village
- Location within Bosnia and Herzegovina
- Coordinates: 44°05′47″N 18°52′00″E
- Country: Bosnia and Herzegovina
- Entity: Republika Srpska
- Municipality: Han Pijesak
- Time zone: UTC+1 (CET)
  - Summer (DST): UTC+2 (CEST)

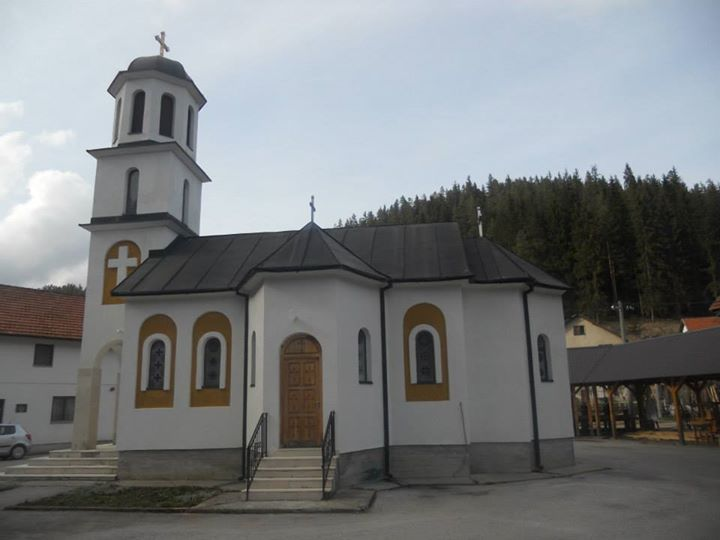
Pjenovac Monastery

Pjenovac (Cyrillic: Пјеновац) is a village in the Republika Srpska, Bosnia and Herzegovina. According to the 1991 census, the village is located in the municipality of Han Pijesak.

The Pjenovac Monastery of Serbian Orthodox Church in the village was built in 2001-2002 close to where once a small medieval monastery stood.
