= Tomislav Bogunović =

Serbian politician

Tomislav Bogunović (Serbian Cyrillic: Томислав Богуновић; born 15 December 1955) is a politician in Serbia. He was the mayor of Bač from 2000 to 2012 and served in the Assembly of Vojvodina during the same period. During his time as an elected official, Bogunović was a member of the Democratic Party (Demokratska stranka, DS).

== Early life and career ==
Bogunović was born in Bačka Topola, Autonomous Province of Vojvodina, in what was then the People's Republic of Serbia in the Federal People's Republic of Yugoslavia. He moved to Bač the following year, completed high school in Bačka Palanka, graduated from the University of Novi Sad's Department of Natural Sciences and Mathematics, and took post-graduate studies in Belgrade. He holds a master's degree in geographical sciences. He was also a professional football player and was a referee in the Yugoslav First League.

== Politician ==
Bogunović contested the 1990 Serbian parliamentary election as an independent candidate in the "Bačka Palanka II & Bač" division. He was defeated by Radovan Pankov of the Socialist Party of Serbia. He joined the DS in 1995.

=== Municipal politics ===
The DS contested the 1996 Serbian local elections as part of the Zajedno (Together) alliance with the Serbian Renewal Movement and other parties. Bogunović was elected to the Bač municipal assembly that year as a Zajedno candidate and subsequently led the alliance's assembly group. In the 2000 local elections, he was re-elected to the assembly as a candidate of the Democratic Opposition of Serbia, a broad coalition of parties that included the DS. He became the municipality's mayor for the first time on 14 October 2000.

Serbia introduced the direct election of mayors for the 2004 local elections. Bogunović was re-elected to the position, defeating Socialist Party-endorsed candidate Milenko Babić in the second round of voting. The direct election of mayors was subsequently eliminated again, and Bogunović was chosen by the assembly for a third term after leading the DS to victory in the 2008 elections.

In 2010, Bogunović accompanied Serbian president Boris Tadić on a delegation to Vukovar in Croatia, where Tadič apologized on behalf of Serbia for the Ovčara massacre during the Croatian War in 1991.

Bogunović led the DS to another plurality victory for Bač in the 2012 local elections, but he was removed from power afterwards by a coalition of the Serbian Progressive Party and the Socialists. He again appeared at the head of the DS list in the 2016 local elections; this time. the list won only two seats out of twenty-five. He continued to serve in the local assembly until 2020 and was not a candidate in that year's local election, which the DS boycotted.

=== Assembly of Vojvodina ===
Bogunović was elected to the Assembly of Vojvodina for the Bač division in the 2000 Vojvodina provincial election. The Democratic Opposition of Serbia won a landslide victory in this election, and Bogunović served as vice-chair of the security committee and a member of the education committee.

Bogunović was re-elected for the Bač division in the 2004 and 2008 provincial elections. He was promoted to chair of the security committee after the 2004 election and continued in this role after 2008. In 2009, he was appointed to the newly created provincial security council. He was defeated in his bid for re-election in 2012. After this time, he served as deputy provincial secretary for health, social policy, and demography.

There were discussions that Bogunović would run for the provincial leadership of the DS in 2015, but this did not occur. After 2012, Vojvodina adopted a system of full proportional representation; Bogunović appeared in the seventieth position on the DS's electoral list in the 2016 Vojvodina provincial election and was not elected when the list won only ten mandates.

Bogunović also appeared on the DS's electoral lists for the National Assembly of Serbia in the 2007 and 2014 parliamentary elections, although he did not receive a mandate on either occasion.

== Electoral record ==
=== Assembly of Vojvodina ===
2012 Vojvodina assembly election Bač (constituency seat) - First and Second Rounds
Milenko Babić	Socialist Party of Serbia (SPS), Party of United Pensioners of Serbia (PUPS), United Serbia (JS), Social Democratic Party of Serbia (SDP Serbia) (Affiliation: Socialist Party of Serbia)	2,437	31.40	4,051	54.86
Tomislav Bogunović (incumbent)	Choice for a Better Vojvodina–Bojan Pajtić (Affiliation: Democratic Party)	2,586	33.32	3,333	45.14
Sava Nićetin	Let's Get Vojvodina Moving–Tomislav Nikolić (Serbian Progressive Party, New Serbia, Movement of Socialists, Strength of Serbia Movement)	989	12.74		
Stevan Kanja	League of Social Democrats of Vojvodina	940	12.11		
Marko Zelinčević	Serbian Radical Party	810	10.44		
Total valid votes		7,762	100	7,384	100

2008 Vojvodina assembly election Bač (constituency seat) - First and Second Rounds
Tomislav Bogunović (incumbent)	For a European Vojvodina Democratic Party–G17 Plus, Boris Tadić (Affiliation: Democratic Party)	3,909	44.55	4,375	63.42
Darko Jovanović	Serbian Radical Party	1,943	22.44	2,523	36.58
Milenko Babić	Socialist Party of Serbia (SPS) Party of United Pensioners of Serbia (PUPS) (Affiliation: Socialist Party of Serbia)	1,595	18.18		
Boško Orlić	Democratic Party of Serbia New Serbia Vojislav Koštunica	513	5.85		
Štefan Slonka	Together for Vojvodina–Nenad Čanak	443	5.05		
Darko Vojnović	Liberal Democratic Party	372	4.24		
Total valid votes		8,775	100	6,898	100
Invalid ballots		286		190	
Total votes casts		9,061	66.97	7,088	52.39

2004 Vojvodina assembly election Bač (constituency seat) - First and Second Rounds
Tomislav Bogunović (incumbent)	Democratic Party–Boris Tadić	3,219	44.34	4,102	54.14
Slobodan Lepojević Bobo	Serbian Radical Party	1,349	18.58	3,475	45.86
Nova Abadžić	For the Revival of the Municipality of Bač	1,286	17.71		
Zoran Atanasković	Democratic Party of Serbia	808	11.13		
Vladimir Guslov	G17 Plus	598	8.24		
Total valid votes		7,260	100	7,577	100
Invalid ballots		386		190	
Total votes casts		7,646	57.11	7,767	58.01

=== Municipality of Bač ===
2004 Bač municipal election Mayor of Bač (Second Round Results)'
Tomislav Bogunović (incumbent)	Democratic Party	4,212	52.97
Milenko Babić	For the Revival of the Municipality of Bač	3,740	47.03
Miloš Vuković	Democratic Party of Serbia	eliminated in first round	
Dragan Medić	Serbian Radical Party	eliminated in first round	
Pavle Dajić	G17 Plus	eliminated in first round	
		7,952	100

=== National Assembly of Serbia ===
1990 Serbian parliamentary election Member for Bačka Palanka II–Bač
Tomislav Bogunović	Citizens' Group	
Miloš Kokanov	Serbian Renewal Movement	
Radovan Pankov	Socialist Party of Serbia	elected
Prerad Preradović	People's Radical Party	
Josip Sorić	Democratic Alliance of Croats in Vojvodina/Union of Reform Forces of Yugoslavia in Vojvodina/ Association for the Yugoslav Democratic Initiative/League of Social Democrats of Vojvodina	
