= Nerići =

- Village
- Location within Bosnia and Herzegovina
- Coordinates: 44°07′38″N 18°52′51″E
- Country: Bosnia and Herzegovina
- Entity: Republika Srpska
- Municipality: Han Pijesak
- Time zone: UTC+1 (CET)
  - Summer (DST): UTC+2 (CEST)

Nerići (Cyrillic: Нерићи) is a village in the Republika Srpska, Bosnia and Herzegovina. According to the 1991 census, the village is located in the municipality of Han Pijesak, with a population of 72.
