= Kraljevo Polje =

Kraljevo Polje Polje
- Village
- Location within Bosnia and Herzegovina
- Coordinates: 44°06′17″N 19°00′08″E
- Country: Bosnia and Herzegovina
- Entity: Republika Srpska
- Municipality: Han Pijesak

Government

Population (1991)
  - Total: 349
- Time zone: UTC+1 (CET)
  - Summer (DST): UTC+2 (CEST)

Kraljevo Polje (Cyrillic: Краљево Поље) is a village in the Republika Srpska, Bosnia and Herzegovina. It is located in the municipality of Han Pijesak. According to the 1991 census, the population of this village is 349.
