= Jelovci (Han Pijesak) =

Village in Republika Srpska, Bosnia and Herzegovina

- Village
- Location within Bosnia and Herzegovina
- Coordinates: 44°01′50″N 19°01′31″E
- Country: Bosnia and Herzegovina
- Entity: Republika Srpska
- Municipality: Han Pijesak
- Time zone: UTC+1 (CET)
  - Summer (DST): UTC+2 (CEST)

Jelovci (Cyrillic: Јеловци) is a village in the Republika Srpska, Bosnia and Herzegovina. According to the 1991 census, the village is located in the municipality of Han Pijesak and has a population of 76.
