= Rečica (Han Pijesak) =

Village in Olovo, Bosnia and Herzegovina

Rečica Речица
- Village
- Location within Bosnia and Herzegovina
- Coordinates: 44°09′24″N 18°48′48″E
- Country: Bosnia and Herzegovina
- Entity: Republika Srpska; Federation of Bosnia and Herzegovina
- Region Canton: Sarajevo; Zenica-Doboj
- Municipality: Han Pijesak; Olovo

Area
  - Total: 2.82 sq mi (7.30 km^{2})

Population (2013)
  - Total: 0
  - Density: 0.0/sq mi (0.0/km^{2})
- Time zone: UTC+1 (CET)
  - Summer (DST): UTC+2 (CEST)

Rečica (Cyrillic: Речица) is a village in the municipalities of Han Pijesak (Republika Srpska) and Olovo, Bosnia and Herzegovina.

== Demographics ==
According to the 2013 census, its population was nil, down from 46 living in the Han Pijesak part with also none ath the time in the Olovo part.
