= Žeravice, Han Pijesak =

Village in Olovo, Bosnia and Herzegovina

Žeravice Жеравице
- Village
- Location within Bosnia and Herzegovina
- Coordinates: 44°08′39″N 18°46′53″E
- Country: Bosnia and Herzegovina
- Entity: Republika Srpska; Federation of Bosnia and Herzegovina
- Region Canton: Sarajevo; Zenica-Doboj
- Municipality: Han Pijesak; Olovo

Area
  - Total: 5.27 sq mi (13.65 km^{2})

Population (2013)
  - Total: 0
  - Density: 0.0/sq mi (0.0/km^{2})
- Time zone: UTC+1 (CET)
  - Summer (DST): UTC+2 (CEST)

Žeravice (Serbian Cyrillic: Жеравице) is a village in the municipalities of Han Pijesak (Republika Srpska) and Olovo, Bosnia and Herzegovina.

After the Dayton Agreement, a large part of the village was ceded to the Federation of Bosnia and Herzegovina and organized into the Olovo municipality.

== Demographics ==
According to the 2013 census, its population was nil. According to the 1991 census, there were 216 inhabitants, 214 of whom were Serbs living in the Han Pijesak part with also none at the time in the Olovo part.
