= Japaga, Bosnia and Herzegovina =

Japaga
- Village
- Location within Bosnia and Herzegovina
- Coordinates: 44°05′25″N 18°56′15″E
- Country: Bosnia and Herzegovina
- Entity: Republika Srpska
- Municipality: Han Pijesak

Population (1991)
  - Total: 152
- Time zone: UTC+1 (CET)
  - Summer (DST): UTC+2 (CEST)

Japaga is a village in the Republika Srpska, Bosnia and Herzegovina. According to the 1991 census, the village is located in the municipality of Han Pijesak and has a population of 152.
