= Han Pijesak =

Han Pijesak Хан Пијесак
- Town and municipality
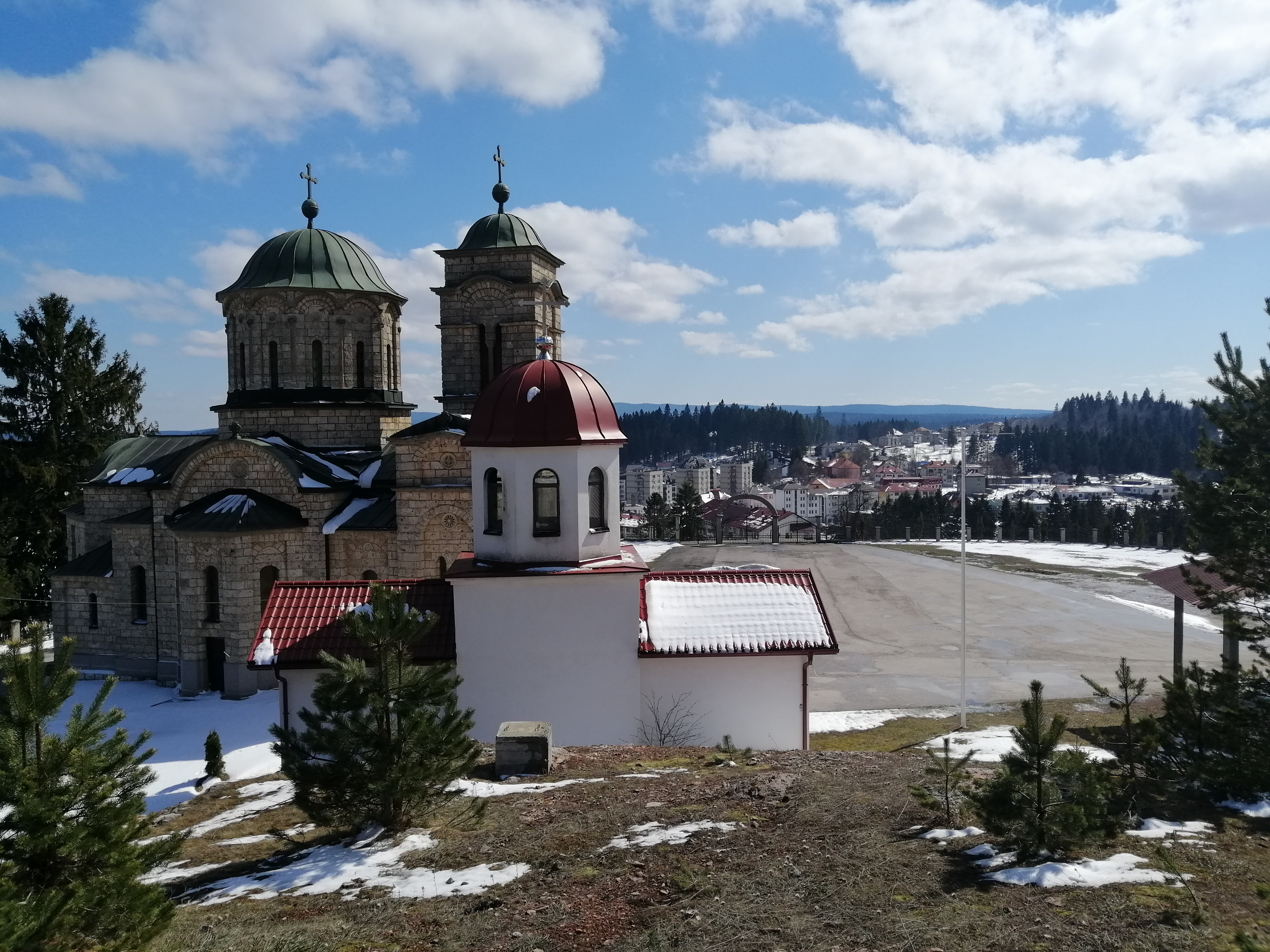
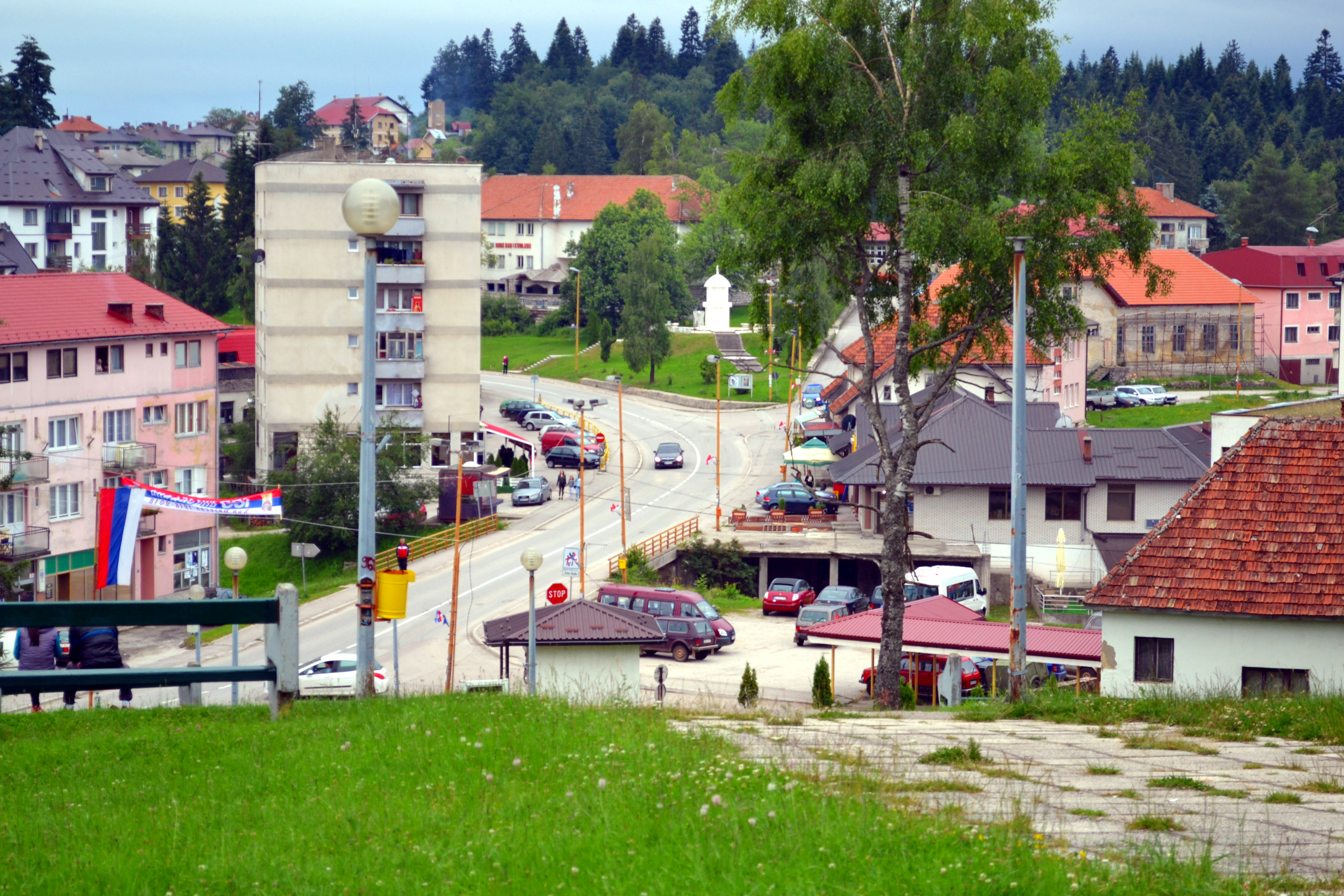
- Han Pijesak

- Location of Han Pijesak within Bosnia and Herzegovina

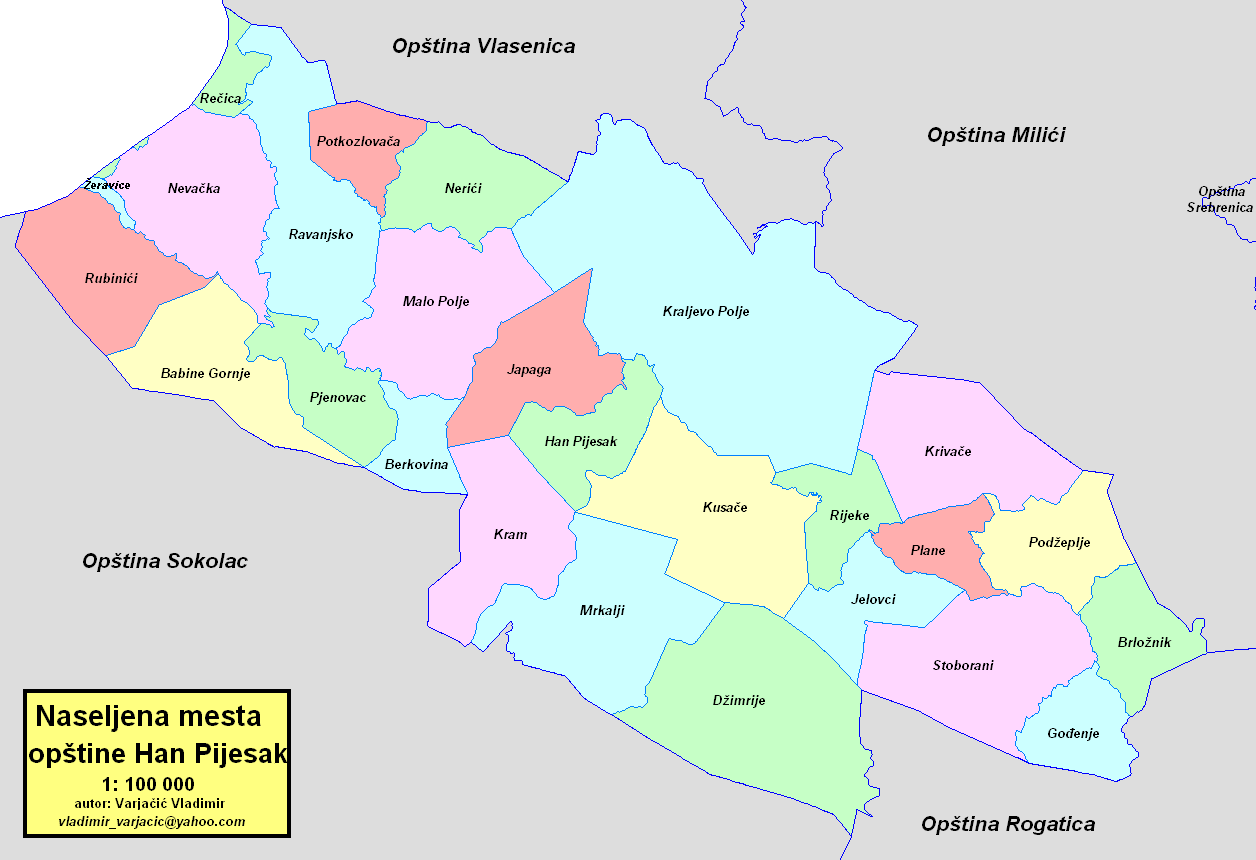
- Coordinates: 44°05′N 18°57′E
- Country: Bosnia and Herzegovina
- Entity: Republika Srpska

Government
  - Municipal mayor: Slobodan Đurić (SNSD)

Area
  - Total: 322.9 km^{2} (124.7 sq mi)

Population (2013 census)
  - Total: 3,530
  - Density: 10.9/km^{2} (28.3/sq mi)
- Time zone: UTC+1 (CET)
  - Summer (DST): UTC+2 (CEST)
- Area code: 57
- Website: hanpijesak.org//

Han Pijesak (Serbian Cyrillic: Хан Пијесак) is a town and municipality in Republika Srpska, Bosnia and Herzegovina. As of 2013, the municipality has a population of 3,530 inhabitants, while the town of Han Pijesak has a population of 1,820 inhabitants.

== Geography ==
Han Pijesak is located about 70km northeast from Sarajevo, on the slopes of mountain Romanija, at an altitude of 1,100m.

== History ==
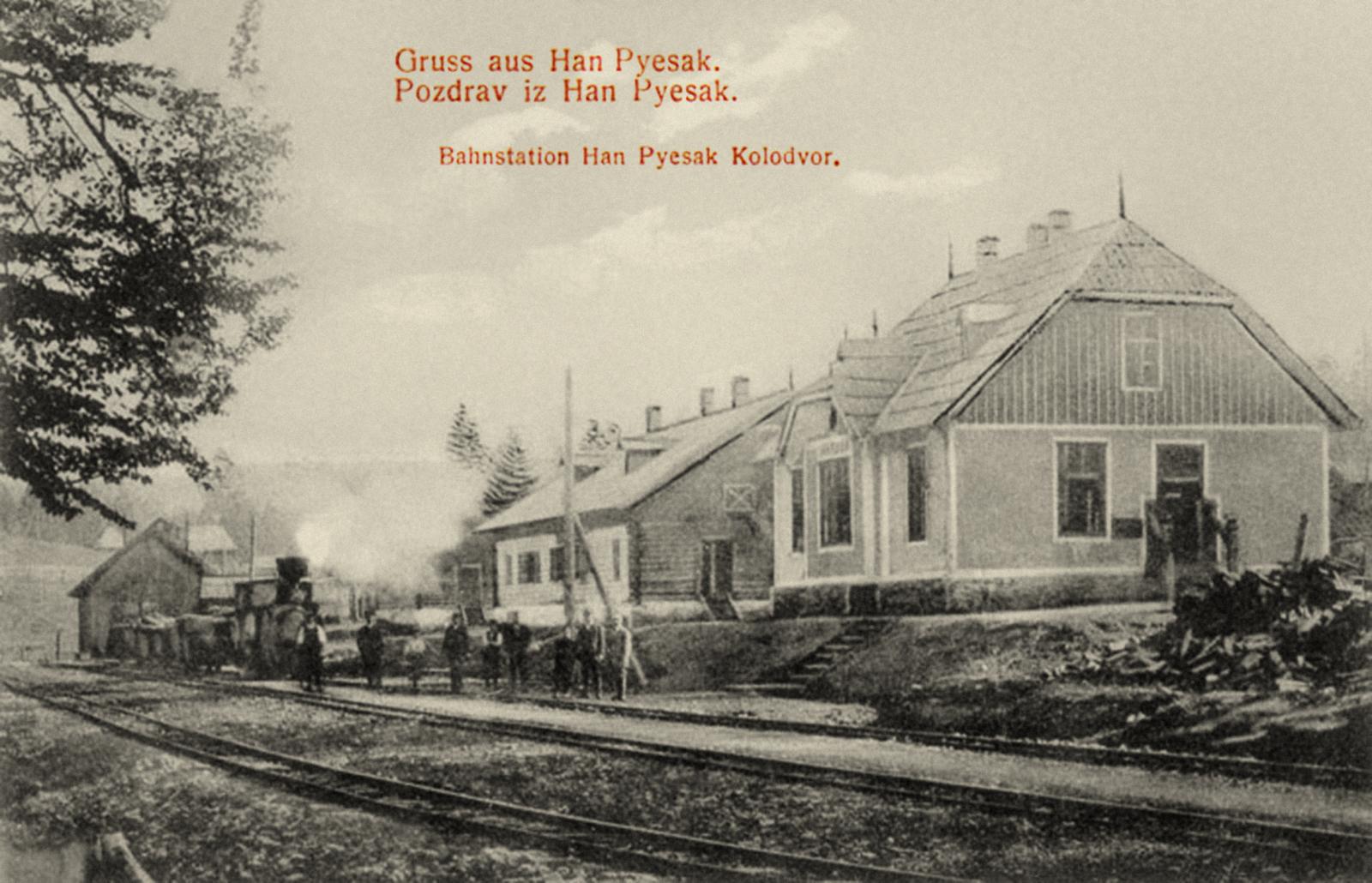
Postcard from Austro-Hungarian era

Medieval stećak monuments on the sites of Pokojnica (Mramorje) and Podgroblje (Luka) are located near the village of Nevačka in Han Pijesak municipality.

In his writings from 1664, 17th-century Ottoman explorer Evliya Çelebi mentioned Han Pijesak as one of the biggest and most important rest stops (hans) on the caravan road from Sarajevo to Zvornik.

During the Habsburg era, Han Pijesak began to serve as an administrative center for the region. A settlement of wood-logging workers around the area of the former han was first mentioned in 1895.

After the Battle of Cer victory in World War I, the Serbian Army led by Miloš Božanović advanced to Han Pijesak area. They fought with the Austrian Army in Eastern Bosnia between August and October 1914, eventually withdrawing to the other side of the Drina.

The summer residence of King Aleksandar I Karadjordjević was built in Han Pijesak in 1922. It was in possession of the royal family until the Second World War, when it began to serve as a military bunker. The renovation of the villa started in 2023.

== Settlements ==
The town of Han Pijesak is home to roughly half the population of the municipality. The municipality also consists of the following settlements:

- Babine Gornje
- Berkovina
- Brložnik
- Džimrije
- Gođenje
- Japaga
- Jelovci
- Kraljevo Polje
- Kram
- Krivače
- Kusače
- Malo Polje
- Mrkalji
- Nerići
- Nevačka
- Pjenovac
- Plane
- Podžeplje
- Potkozlovača
- Ravanjsko
- Rečica
- Rijeke
- Rubinići
- Stoborani
- Žeravice

== Demographics ==
=== Population ===
Population of settlements – Han Pijesak municipality
	Settlement	1971.	1981.	1991.	2013.
	Total	7,804	6,879	6,348	3,530
1	Han Pijesak	1,487	1,695	2,117	1,820
2	Japaga			152	210
3	Kraljevo Polje			349	402
4	Džimrije			207	134
5	Mrkalji			141	109
6	Nevačka			334	109
7	Kusače			135	88
8	Podžeplje			319	89
9	Gođenje			580	78
10	Kram			102	62
11	Malo Polje			121	60
12	Pjenovac			128	54
13	Stoborani			247	47
14	Rijeke			130	37
15	Jelovci			76	32
16	Ravanjsko			57	33

=== Ethnic composition ===
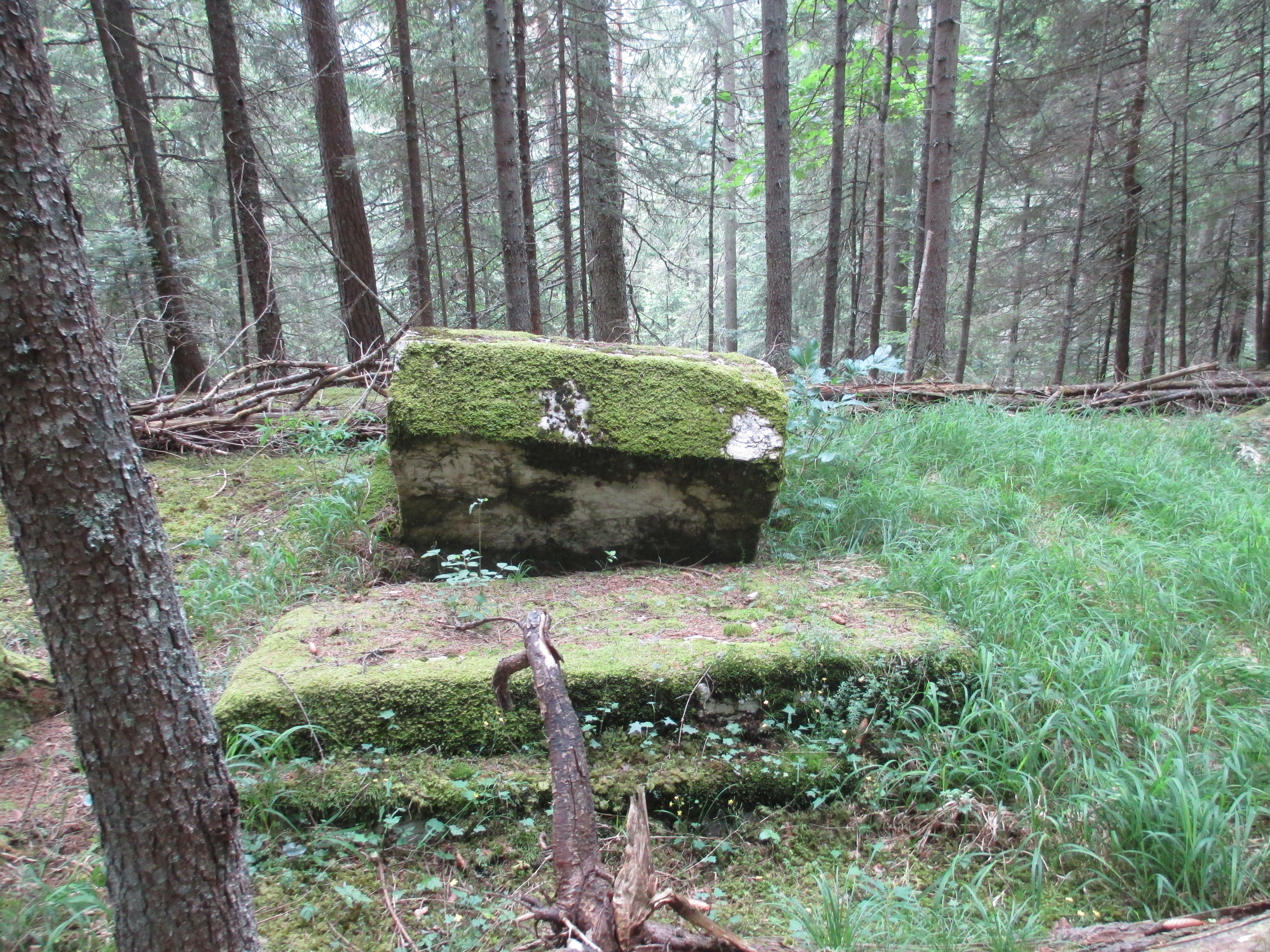
Stećak found in Han Pijesak, a part of a medieval fortress

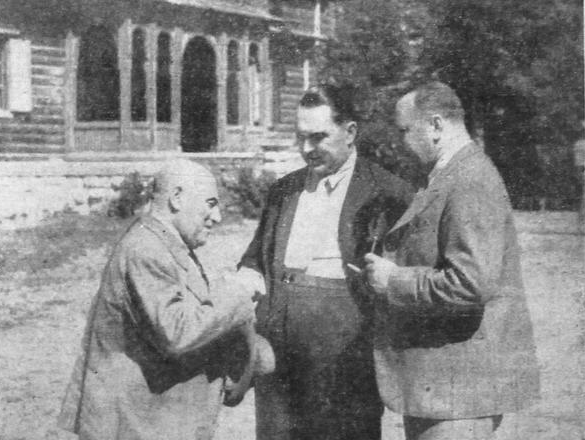
PM Milan Stojadinović in the city

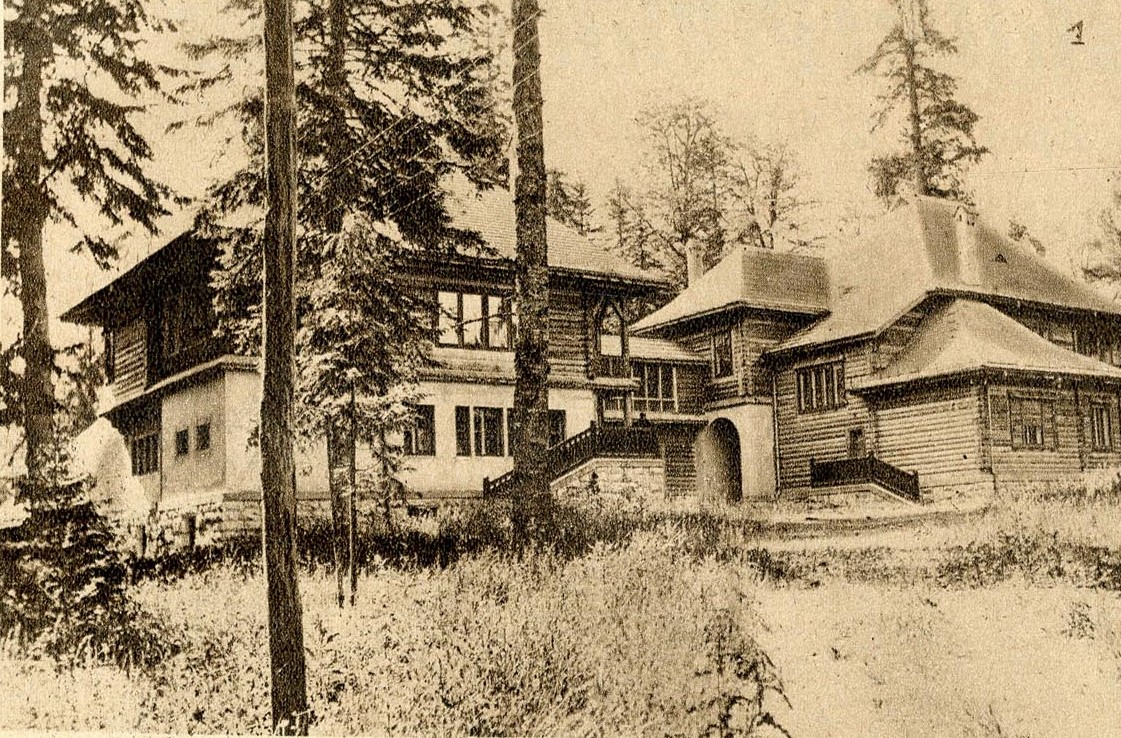
Villa of king Alexander I of Yugoslavia

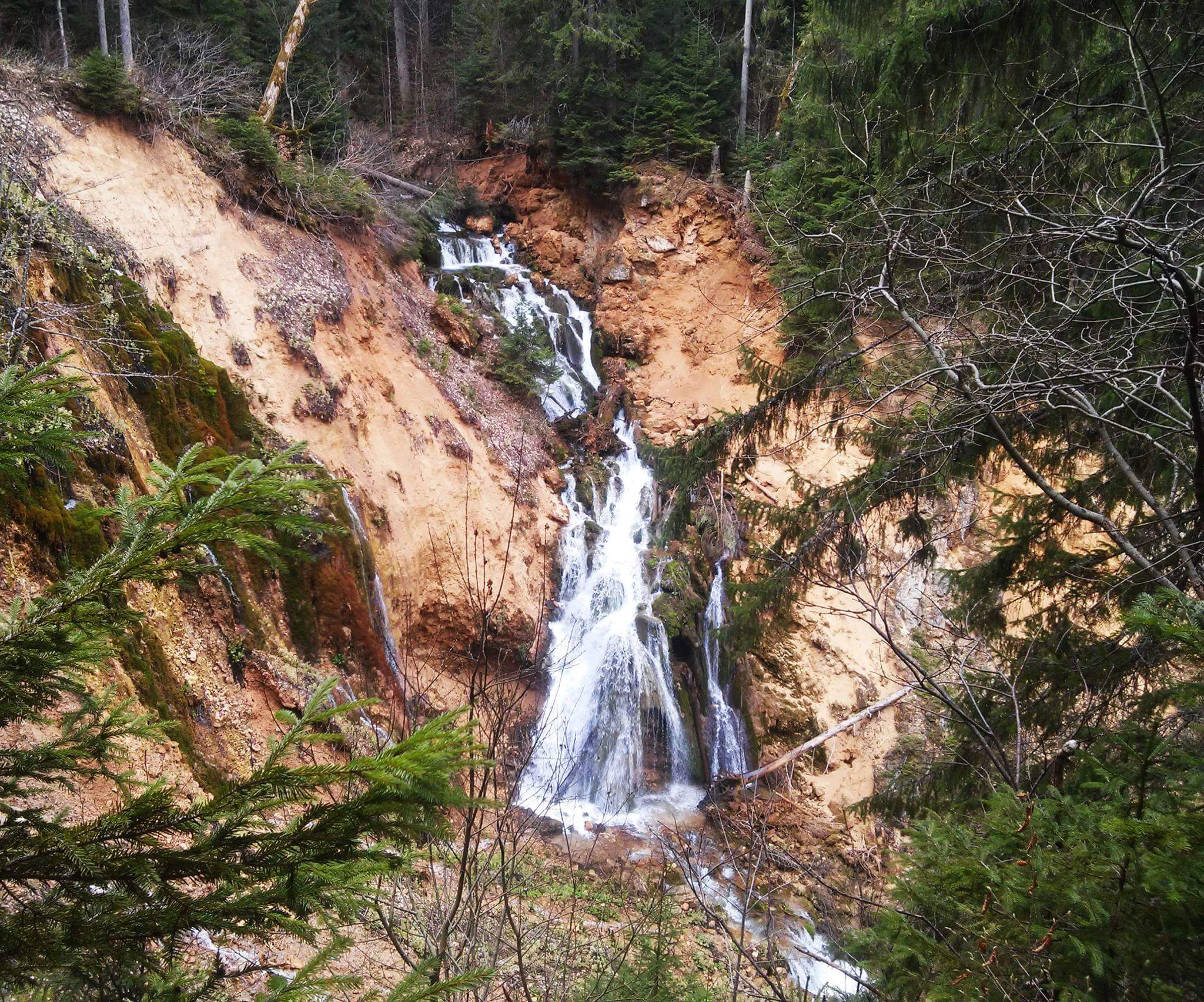
Waterfall in Žeravice

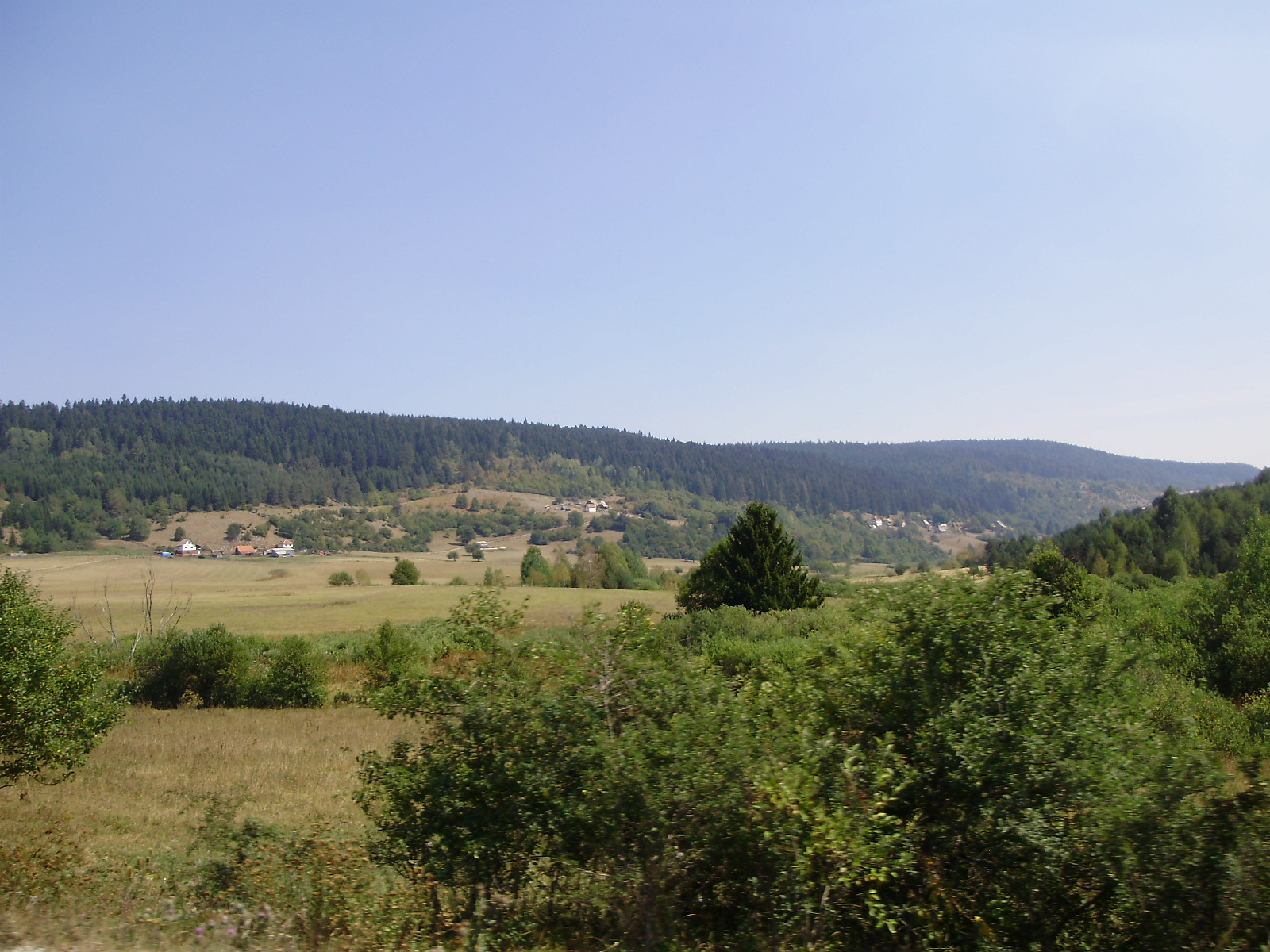
Landscape from Han Pijesak

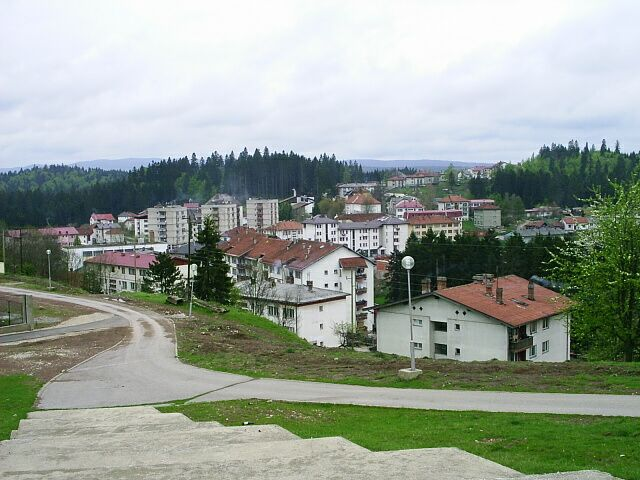
City centre

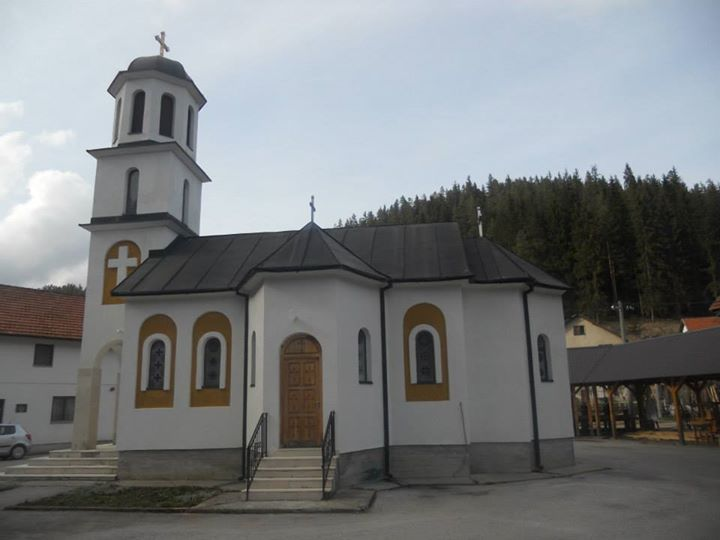
Pjenovac monastery

Ethnic composition – Han Pijesak town
	2013.	1991.	1981.	1971.
Total	1,820 (100,0%)	2,117 (100,0%)	1,695 (100,0%)	1,487 (100,0%)
Serbs	1808 (99.3%)	1,873 (88,47%)	1,413 (83,36%)	1,326 (89,17%)
Bosniaks	0 (0%)	148 (6,991%)	82 (4,838%)	108 (7,263%)
Yugoslavs	0 (0%)	55 (2,598%)	160 (9,440%)	3 (0,202%)
Others	8 (0.4%)	38 (1,795%)	9 (0,531%)	6 (0,403%)
Croats	4 (0.2%)	3 (0,142%)	3 (0,177%)	4 (0,269%)
Montenegrins			17 (1,003%)	19 (1,278%)
Albanians			9 (0,531%)	11 (0,740%)
Macedonians			2 (0,118%)	6 (0,403%)
Slovenes				4 (0,269%)

Ethnic composition – Han Pijesak municipality
	2013.	1991.	1981.	1971.
Total	3,530 (100,0%)	6,348 (100,0%)	6,879 (100,0%)	7,804 (100,0%)
Serbs	3,068 (86,91%)	3,674 (57,88%)	3,927 (57,09%)	4,790 (61,38%)
Bosniaks	431 (12,21%)	2,543 (40,06%)	2,666 (38,76%)	2,921 (37,43%)
Others	24 (0,680%)	56 (0,882%)	18 (0,262%)	11 (0,141%)
Croats	7 (0,198%)	7 (0,110%)	9 (0,131%)	16 (0,205%)
Yugoslavs		68 (1,071%)	222 (3,227%)	7 (0,090%)
Montenegrins			24 (0,349%)	28 (0,359%)
Albanians			9 (0,131%)	19 (0,243%)
Macedonians			3 (0,044%)	8 (0,103%)
Slovenes			1 (0,015%)	4 (0,051%)

== Economy ==
The following table gives a preview of the total number of registered people employed in legal entities per their core activity (as of 2018):

Activity	Total
Agriculture, forestry and fishing	437
Mining and quarrying	1
Manufacturing	100
Electricity, gas, steam and air conditioning supply	15
Water supply; sewerage, waste management and remediation activities	25
Construction	16
Wholesale and retail trade, repair of motor vehicles and motorcycles	40
Transportation and storage	32
Accommodation and food services	21
Information and communication	2
Financial and insurance activities	6
Real estate activities	-
Professional, scientific and technical activities	3
Administrative and support service activities	1
Public administration and defense; compulsory social security	105
Education	37
Human health and social work activities	28
Arts, entertainment and recreation	14
Other service activities	2
Total	884

== See also ==
- Municipalities of Bosnia and Herzegovina
