= Radovan Pankov (politician) =

Serbian politician (1946–2024)

Radovan Pankov (Serbian Cyrillic: Радован Панков; 1946 – 5 December 2024) was a Serbian politician. He was minister of the diaspora in the Serbian government from 1994 to 1998 and served in the Serbian and Yugoslavian parliaments. During his political career, Pankov was a member of the Socialist Party of Serbia (Socijalistička partija Srbije, SPS).

== Background ==
Pankov was from the village of Tovariševo in Bačka Palanka in the province of Vojvodina. He was an educator in his private life.

Pankov died in Novi Sad on 5 November 2024.

== Political career ==
=== Early years (1990–94) ===
Pankov was a leading participant in Vojvodina's so-called "Yoghurt Revolution" of October 1988, which led to the overthrow of the province's existing government and its replacement by allies of Slobodan Milošević. In 1990, he was appointed to the executive committee of the SPS's main board. He also served as leader of the SPS in Vojvodina in the early-to-mid-1990s.

He was elected to the Serbian parliament in the 1990 Serbian election, winning the single-member constituency of Bačka Palanka II–Bač. The Socialist Party won a majority government in the election, and on 16 January 1991 Pankov was chosen as a deputy speaker of the assembly. He served in this role for the next two years. He was also chosen as part of Serbia's delegation to the Yugoslavian Assembly's Chamber of Republics in 1992 and also served as vice-president of this assembly over the next year.

Serbia adopted a system of proportional representation prior to the 1992 Serbian parliamentary election. Pankov appeared in the lead position on the SPS's electoral list for the Novi Sad division in this election and received an automatic mandate when the list won nine seats. (From 1992 to 2000, Serbia's electoral law stipulated that one-third of parliamentary mandates would be assigned to candidates from successful lists in numerical order, with the remaining two-thirds distributed amongst other candidates on the lists at the discretion of the sponsoring parties.) The Socialists won a minority government and remained in power through an informal alliance with the far-right Serbian Radical Party (Srpska radikalna stranka, SRS). Pankov continued to serve in the assembly's delegation to the Chamber of Republics.

The SPS's alliance with the SRS broke down in 1993, and a new parliamentary election was held in December of that year. Pankov again appeared in the lead position on the SPS's list in Novi Sad and was re-elected when the list won thirteen mandates. The Socialists won an increased minority victory and formed a new coalition government with New Democracy (Nova demokratija, ND).

In January 1994, Pankov supported Milan Martić's candidacy for president of the self-proclaimed Republic of Serbian Krajina in Croatia. The following month, Pankov was re-appointed to another term in Serbia's delegation to the Chamber of Republics.

=== Cabinet minister (1994–1998) ===
Pankov was appointed to cabinet on 18 March 1994, serving as minister for the Serbian diaspora in the first cabinet of Mirko Marjanović. His main focus was on Serbia's relations with Serbs in the breakaway territories of the Republic of Serbian Krajina (Croatia) and the Republika Srpska (Bosnia and Herzegovina).

In December 1994, Pankov articulated the government's position that Serbia was in favour of a peaceful resolution to the ongoing Croatian and Bosnian Wars and supported equal rights and status for all warring sides, calling in particular for the Serb communities in these countries to receive "the same rights that have been recognized for the members of other ethnic groups on the former Yugoslav territories." He also urged an end to international sanctions against the Federal Republic of Yugoslavia. In the same month, he said that around ninety per cent of Serbia's humanitarian aid to the Republika Srpska and the Republic of Serbian Krajina consisted of food, with the remainder being devoted to medicine and textbooks.

On 19 December 1994, Pankov led a delegation of Serbian politicians to a ceremony marking the third anniversary of the parliament of the Republic of Serbian Krajina. He indicated the Serbian government's view that a peaceful resolution of the Croatian War would require recognition of the Serbian entity.

After the conclusion of the Croatian War, Pankov took part in the Serbian government's discussions with United Nations administrator Jacques Paul Klein on issues in the rump territory of Eastern Slavonia, Baranja, and Western Syrmia. He also sent a letter of support to the Serb National Council in Croatia upon its founding.

Pankov was removed from the SPS's executive committee in November 1995, in what was described as a purge of officials with hardline Serbian nationalist views. His demotion within the party was only temporary, however: he returned to the executive in May 1997. He once again appeared in the lead position on the SPS's list for the smaller, redistributed division of Novi Sad in the 1997 Serbian parliamentary election and was re-elected when the list won three mandates. Once again, the Socialists and their allies won a minority victory in this election.

=== Out of cabinet (1998–2001) ===
In early 1998, the SPS formed a new coalition administration with the Yugoslav Left (Jugoslovenska Levica, JUL) and the SRS. Pankov was dropped from cabinet on 24 March 1998, and his term in the Yugoslav Chamber of Republics seems to have ended at around the same time. He was not a candidate for re-election to the Serbian parliament in the 2000 election, which occurred after Slobodan Milošević's fall from power. His parliamentary career ended when the new assembly convened in January 2001.

=== After 2000 ===
In 2015, it was reported that Pankov and fellow Milošević-era cabinet minister Mihalj Kertes had joined the Serbian Progressive Party (Srpska napredna stranka, SNS). They neither confirmed nor denied the rumours.

== Electoral record ==
=== National Assembly of Serbia ===
1990 Serbian parliamentary election Member for Bačka Palanka II–Bač
Tomislav Bogunović	Citizens' Group	
Miloš Kokanov	Serbian Renewal Movement	
Radovan Pankov	Socialist Party of Serbia	elected
Prerad Preradović	People's Radical Party	
Josip Sorić	Democratic Alliance of Croats in Vojvodina/Union of Reform Forces of Yugoslavia in Vojvodina/ Association for the Yugoslav Democratic Initiative/League of Social Democrats of Vojvodina	
