= Malo Polje (Han Pijesak) =

- Village
- Location within Bosnia and Herzegovina
- Coordinates: 44°06′52″N 18°52′17″E
- Country: Bosnia and Herzegovina
- Entity: Republika Srpska
- Municipality: Han Pijesak
- Time zone: UTC+1 (CET)
  - Summer (DST): UTC+2 (CEST)

Malo Polje (Cyrillic: Мало Поље) is a village in the Republika Srpska, Bosnia and Herzegovina. The village is located in the municipality of Han Pijesak. According to the 1991 census, the population was 121.
