= Bogoljub Šijaković =

Serbian scholar & politician (born 1955)

Minister of Religion
- In office 7 July 2008 – 14 March 2011
- Preceded by: Milan Radulovic
- Succeeded by: Post abolished

Minister of Religious Affairs
- In office 2000–2002

Personal details
- Born: 6 August 1955 (age 71) Nikšić, PR Montenegro, FPR Yugoslavia
- Party: Democratic Party
- Education: University of Belgrade; University of Sarajevo
- Profession: Scholar

Bogoljub Šijaković (Serbian Cyrillic: Богољуб Шијаковић; born 1955 in Nikšić) is a Serbian scholar, Professor of Philosophy at the Faculty of Orthodox Theology at the University of Belgrade (Serbia) and Professor of Greek Philosophy at the Faculty of Philosophy in Nikšić (Montenegro). He served as the Minister of Religious Affairs in the Federal Government of Yugoslavia (2000–2002) and in the Government of the Republic of Serbia (2008–2011).

== Biography ==
Bogoljub Šijaković studied philosophy at the University of Belgrade, Faculty of Philosophy, graduating in 1981 and obtaining a magister degree in 1986. In 1989, he received his PhD in early Greek philosophy from the University of Sarajevo. His research stays abroad include LMU Munich (1988/1989, with Professor Werner Beierwaltes) and the National and Kapodistrian University of Athens (recurring short-term visits during 1993-1996, with Professor Konstantine Boudouris).

He has published over 330 articles, studies, bibliographies and reviews in periodicals and collections of papers in Serbian, German, English, French, Russian, Italian, Slovenian and Bulgarian. To date, he has edited over 40 thematic publications. He was editor-in-chief of the Journal for Philosophy and Sociology Luča (1992–2006) and founding editor of the International Journal for Philosophy and Theology Philotheos (since 2001), as well as of periodicals Bibliographia serbica theologica (since 2009) and Bibliographia serbica philosophica (since 2011). He is managing the project Serbian Theology in the Twentieth Century and editing the accompanying collection of papers (20 vols., 2007–2015). His many translations in Serbian encompass German, English, Russian and Greek texts (e.g. F. D. E. Schleiermacher, M. Heidegger, H.-G. Gadamer, E. Fink, H. Blumenberg, E. Fromm, W. D. Ross, G. Florovsky).

== Selected works ==
- Mythos, physis, psyche: An Essay in Presocratic “Ontology” and “Psychology” (in Serbian 1991, ^{2}2002; Summary in German)
- Zoon politikon: Examples from Personal Legitimacy (in Serbian 1994)
- Amicus Hermes: Aufsätze zur Hermeneutik der griechischen Philosophie (collection of essays in various languages 1996; in Serbian 1994 as Hermes’ Wings)
- History, Responsibility, Holiness (in Serbian 1997)
- Bibliographia Praesocratica: A Bibliographical Guide to the Studies of Early Greek Philosophy in its Religious and Scientific Contexts with an Introductory Bibliography on the Historiography of Philosophy (Paris 2001)
- Between God and Man: Essays in Greek and Christian Thought (Sankt Augustin 2002)
- Face to Face with the Other: A Fugue in Essays (in Serbian 2002)
- A Critique of Balkanistic Discourse: Contribution to the Phenomenology of Balkan “Otherness” (Toronto 2004; in Serbian 2000, ^{5}2012; in Italian 2001; in Slovenian 2001; in German 2004; in French 2010; in Russian 2015)
- Mirroring in Context: On Knowledge and Belief, Tradition and Identity, Church and State (in Serbian 2009, ^{2}2011)
- Myth and Philosophy: The Ontological Potentiality of Myth and the Beginning of Greek Philosophy. Theories of Myth and Greek Mythmaking: A Bibliography (in Serbian 2012; Summaries in English and German)
- On Suffering and Memory: Selected “Anthropological” Essays (in Serbian 2012)
- History : Violence : Theory: Selected “Historiosophical” Essays (in Serbian 2012)
- The Presence of Transcendence: Essays on Facing the Other through Holiness, History and Text (Los Angeles 2013; in Serbian 2013)
- University and Serbian Theology (Belgrade 2014; in Serbian 2010, ^{2}2014)
- Great War, Ethics of Vidovdan, Memory (in Serbian 2015)
- Resistance to Oblivion (in Serbian 2016)
