= Žeravice (Hodonín District) =

- Municipality
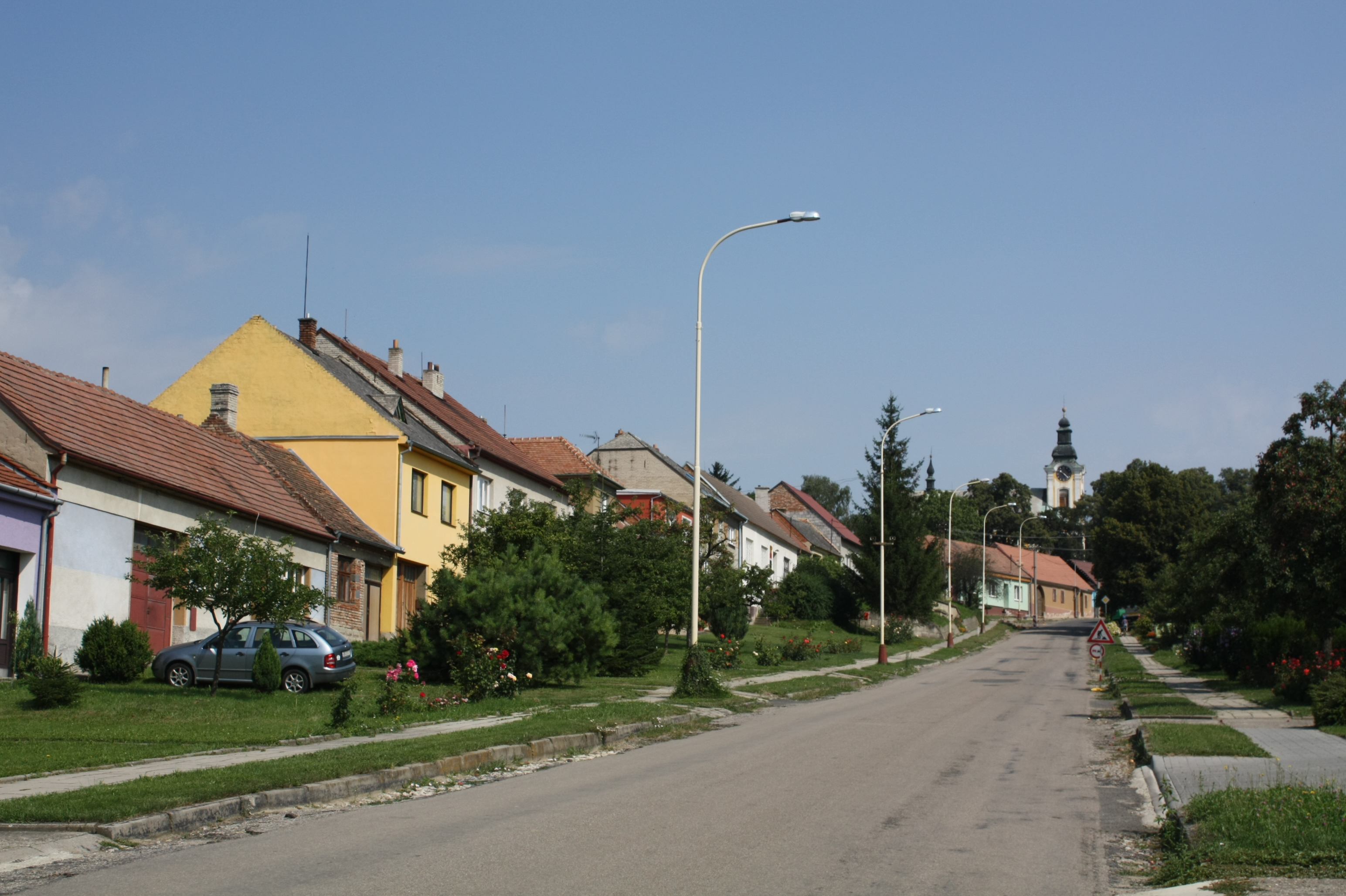
- Main street

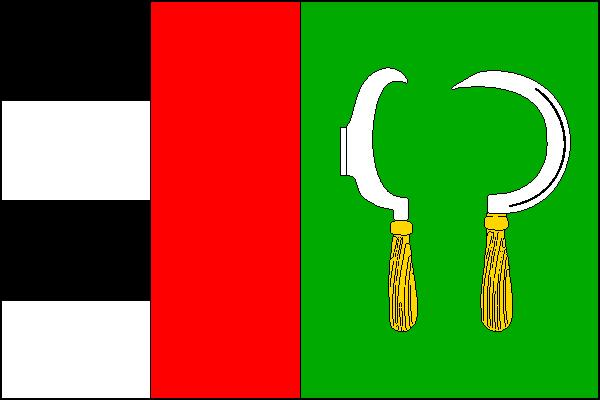
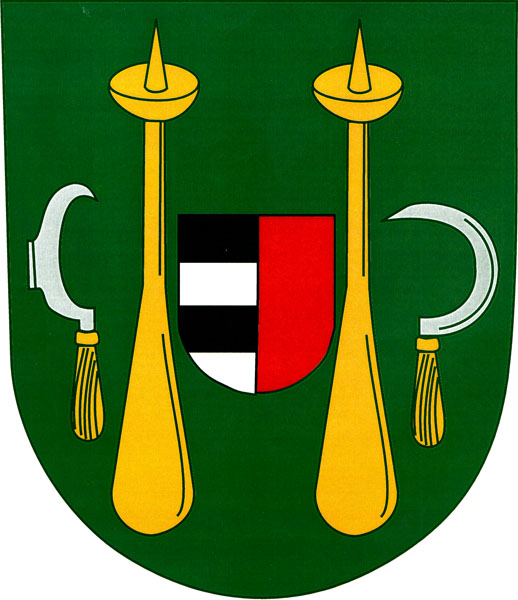
- Flag Coat of arms

- Location in the Czech Republic
- Coordinates: 49°1′22″N 17°14′14″E
- Country: Czech Republic
- Region: South Moravian
- District: Hodonín
- First mentioned: 1235

Area
  - Total: 7.00 km^{2} (2.70 sq mi)
- Elevation: 260 m (850 ft)

Population (2026-01-01)
  - Total: 984
  - Density: 141/km^{2} (364/sq mi)
- Time zone: UTC+1 (CET)
  - Summer (DST): UTC+2 (CEST)
- Postal code: 696 47
- Website: www.obeczeravice.cz

Žeravice is a municipality and village in Hodonín District in the South Moravian Region of the Czech Republic. It has about 1,000 inhabitants.

Žeravice lies approximately 21 kilometres (13 mi) north of Hodonín, 50 km (31 mi) south-east of Brno, and 236 km (147 mi) south-east of Prague.

== Demographics ==
Historical population
Year	Pop.	±%
1869	848	—
1880	982	+15.8%
1890	988	+0.6%
1900	1,052	+6.5%
1910	1,102	+4.8%
1921	1,134	+2.9%
1930	1,007	−11.2%
1950	972	−3.5%
1961	1,184	+21.8%
1970	1,148	−3.0%
1980	1,152	+0.3%
1991	1,076	−6.6%
2001	1,027	−4.6%
2011	1,055	+2.7%
2021	924	−12.4%
Source: Censuses
