= Vojislav Vukčević =

Serbian politician (1938–2016)

Vojislav Vukčević (Serbian Cyrillic: Војислав Вукчевић; 1938–2016) was a Serbian politician. He served as the Minister of Diaspora from 2004 to 2007.

== Education and career ==
Vukčević was born in 1938 in Osijek in the Kingdom of Yugoslavia (today in Croatia), his father being from Montenegro. He graduated from the University of Belgrade's Law School and received a doctoral degree from the University of Novi Sad Faculty of Law, in 1974. He was a president of the court in Beli Manastir, and worked as a dean and professor at the Faculty of Law, Osijek University, until the breakup of the Socialist Federal Republic of Yugoslavia. He was the founder of the Serbian Democratic Party (SDS) in Baranja and Eastern Slavonia in 1990.

Vukčević has been a secretary-general of the Serbian Renewal Movement since 1994. He was a deputy in the parliament and minister for relations with Serbs outside Serbia in the transitional government.

He was married with two children.

Government offices
| Preceded by Milorad Mirčić | Minister of Diaspora; 2000–2001 | Succeeded by Position abolished |
| Preceded by Position reestablished | Minister of Diaspora; 2004–2007 | Succeeded by Milica Čubrilo |
