= Ministry of Religion (Serbia) =

- Министарство вера Ministarstvo vera

Ministry overview
- Formed: 11 February 1991
- Dissolved: 14 March 2011
- Superseding Ministry: Ministry of Religion and Diaspora
- Jurisdiction: Government of Serbia

The Ministry of Religion of the Republic of Serbia (Serbian: Министарство вера / Ministarstvo vera) was the ministry in the Government of Serbia which was in charge of religion. The ministry was merged into the Ministry of Diaspora on 14 March 2011, which in turn merged into the Ministry of Culture and Information on 27 July 2012.

== List of ministers ==
Political Party: SPS SRS SPO DOS DSS DS

Name (Birth–Death)	Party	Term of Office		Prime Minister (Cabinet)
Dragan Dragojlović (born 1941)	SPS	11 February 1991	24 March 1998	Zelenović (I); Božović (I); Šainović (I); Marjanović (I)
Milovan Radovanović (born 1954)	SRS	24 March 1998	24 October 2000	Marjanović (II)
Gordana Aničić (born 1944)	SPO	24 October 2000	25 January 2001	Minić (transitional)
Vojislav Milovanović (born 1947)	DOS	25 January 2001	3 March 2004	Đinđić (I); Živković (I)
Milan Radulović (1948–2017)	DSS	3 March 2004	15 May 2007	Koštunica (I)
Radomir Naumov (1945–2015)	DSS	15 May 2007	7 July 2008	Koštunica (II)
Bogoljub Šijaković (born 1955)	DS	7 July 2008	14 March 2011	Cvetković (I)
