= Emigration from Serbia =

The emigration from Serbia consists of citizens of Serbia or Serbia-born people living outside Serbia and its neighboring countries. It is not to be confused with the Serb diaspora, which refers to ethnic Serb people from not just Serbia but also from its neighbouring countries and their descendants living abroad. Recent estimates indicate that about 800,000 Serbian nationals live abroad, predominantly in Europe and, to a much lesser extent, overseas (primarily in North America and Oceania).

Citizens of Serbia in most of the countries and territories bordering Serbia (Bosnia and Herzegovina, Montenegro, Croatia, Kosovo, and North Macedonia) are generally not considered part of the emigrant population from Serbia, as they are largely indistinguishable from the autochthonous ethnic Serb communities in those states, which have the legal status of recognized ethnic minorities or, in the case of Bosnia and Herzegovina, one of the constituent peoples.

== History ==
The major political and economical changes of the 1990s in Serbia after the breakup of Yugoslavia caused economic collapse with an estimated 300,000 people leaving Serbia during that period.

In 2015, it was estimated that around 800,000 people in Serbia receive financial support from relatives abroad.

== Demographics ==
Countries with significant population of Serbian citizens or Serbia-born persons. Serbia + 100,000 + 10,000 + 1,000

Country	Serbian citizens	Serbia-born residents
Germany	272,690 (2024)	
Austria	121,916 (2023)	141,882 (2023)
France	62,779 (2018)	74,000 (2023 est.)
Switzerland	56,743 (2024)	
United States		42,903 (2023)
Canada	26,065 (2021)	31,925 (2021)
Italy	29,679 (2024)	
Australia		25,454 (2021)
Slovenia	17,652 (2023)	30,248 (2021)
Sweden	11,860 (2023)	17,909 (2024)
United Kingdom		12,186 (2021)
Norway	5,075 (2023)	8,964 (2025)
Malta	5,533 (2021)	5,935 (2021)
Czechia	4,889 (2023)	
Netherlands	3,329 (2023)	11,817 (2024)
Belgium		4,151 (2021)
Hungary	3,988 (2023)	
Denmark	3,949 (2024)	
Spain	3,943 (2022)	
Greece	2,456 (2021)	
Luxembourg	1,814 (2023)	
Romania	1,767 (2023 est.)	
Turkey	1,622 (2023)	
Bulgaria	1,497 (2023)	
Slovakia	1,248 (2023)	
China	735 (2020)	
Cyprus	421 (2021)	786 (2021)
Finland	712 (2023)	702 (2023)
Ireland	700 (2023)	343 (2016)
Portugal	425 (2024)	
Liechtenstein	199 (2022)	
Iceland	181 (2023)	606 (2024)
Estonia	72 (2023)	
Latvia	25 (2023)	
Lithuania	11 (2023)	

== See also ==
- Serb diaspora
- Directorate for Cooperation with the Diaspora and Serbs in the Region

== Annotations ==
1. The Danish censuses separately lists Danish citizens with Serbia, Serbia and Montenegro, FR Yugoslavia, Yugoslavia, as 'country of origin', and do the same with Danish residents. This results in unreliable data.
2. The Icelandic censuses separately lists Serbian-born (excl. Kosovo) immigrants, Serbian citizens, former Serbian, Icelandic citizens, and the same for Serbia-Montenegro and Yugoslavia. This results in unreliable data.

== Sources ==
- Eurostat. "Population on 1 January by age group, sex and citizenship". Eurostat. doi:10.2908/migr_pop1ctz.
- "Migration in Serbia: A Country Profile 2008" (PDF). IOM. International Organisation for Migration (IOM). 2008.
