= Directorate for Cooperation with the Diaspora and Serbs in the Region =

Directorate of the Ministry of Foreign Affairs of Serbia

- Управа за сарадњу с дијаспором и Србима у региону
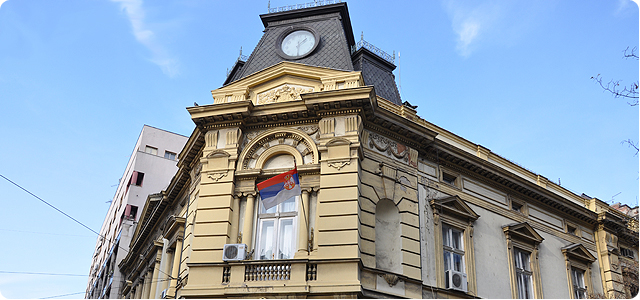
- Headquarters of the Directorate for Cooperation with the Diaspora and Serbs in the Region

Directorate overview
- Formed: 2 August 2012
- Preceding Directorate: Ministry of Religion and Diaspora
- Headquarters: Vase Čarapića 20, Belgrade
- Parent department: Ministry of Foreign Affairs
- Website: dijaspora.gov.rs

The Directorate for Cooperation with the Diaspora and Serbs in the Region (Serbian: Управа за сарадњу с дијаспором и Србима у региону, romanized: Uprava za saradnju s dijasporom i Srbima u regionu) is directorate of the Ministry of Foreign Affairs of Serbia.

== Organization ==
The director is in charge of the directorate and is appointed by the Government of Serbia. The mandate of the director is 5 years.

== Jurisdiction ==
The jurisdiction of the directorate is established by its statute:

- Monitoring of the status of Serbian citizens that live outside of Serbia;
- Improvement of electoral rights of Serbian citizens in diaspora and assistance in preserving spiritual, cultural and national heritage of the Serb people that live outside of Serbia;
- Improvement of ties between of Serbian citizens and their organizations in diaspora and the Republic of Serbia;
- Informing Serbian citizens and their organizations in diaspora about political actions of the Republic of Serbia;
- Assistance involving refugees, people of Serb origins and citizens of Serbia that live in diaspora in political, economic, and cultural life of Republic of Serbia and their return to Serbia.

== Missions ==
- Realization of conservation strategy and strengthening the ties between diaspora and Serbia;
- Assistance in activities of diaspora parliament;
- Involving diaspora in process of investing in small and medium enterprises;
- Intercession in the process of removing administrative barriers for involving diaspora in the Serbian economy;
- Incitement of citizens of Serbia to get involved in the politics of the residing countries;
- Preservation of Serbian language via opening of schools and other institutions in diaspora;
- Making of convergent portal towards diaspora;
- Improvement of cultural, economic and other forms of cooperation with the diaspora using human capital available in diaspora;
- Presentation of the diaspora in Serbia and raising awareness of the importance of diaspora;
- Enhancement and preservation reputation of Serbia in world, struggle against anti-Serb sentiment.
