= Gordana Čomić =

Serbian politician (born 1958)

- Гордана Чомић
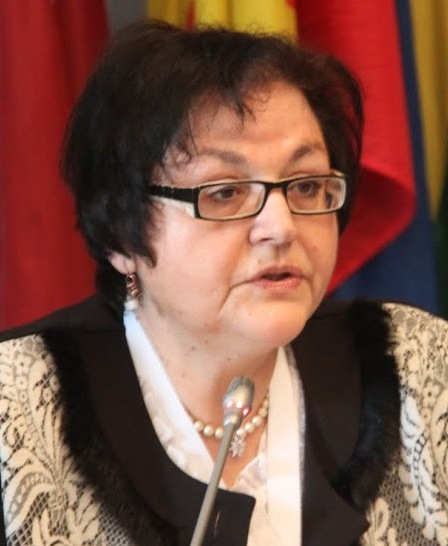
- Čomić in 2014

Minister for Human and Minority Rights and Social Dialogue
- In office 28 October 2020 – 26 October 2022
- Prime Minister: Ana Brnabić
- Preceded by: Position re-established (Note: Milan Marković was styled as the Minister of Human and Minority Rights, Public Administration, and Local Self-Government between 2011 and 2012.)
- Succeeded by: Tomislav Žigmanov

Vice President of the National Assembly of the Republic of Serbia
- In office 6 June 2016 – 3 August 2020
- In office 23 April 2014 – 3 June 2016
- In office 23 July 2012 – 16 April 2014
- In office 26 June 2008 – 31 May 2012
- In office 22 January 2001 – 27 January 2004

Member of the National Assembly of the Republic of Serbia
- In office 22 January 2001 – 3 August 2020

Vice President of the Assembly of Vojvodina
- In office 23 October 2000 – 5 February 2001

Member of the Assembly of Vojvodina for Novi Sad Division 10
- In office 23 October 2000 – 30 October 2004
- Preceded by: Lazar Slepčev
- Succeeded by: redistribution

Member of the Assembly of Vojvodina for Novi Sad Division 13
- In office 9 January 1997 – 23 October 2000
- Preceded by: Stevan Vrbaški
- Succeeded by: Aleksandar Jevtić

Personal details
- Born: 16 June 1958 (age 68) Novi Sad, PR Serbia, FPR Yugoslavia
- Party: DS (1990–2020); Independent (2020–present)
- Education: University of Novi Sad
- Occupation: Politician

Gordana Čomić (Serbian Cyrillic: Гордана Чомић; born 16 June 1958) is a Serbian politician. She was a member of the Serbian parliament from 2001 to 2020 and was Serbia's minister for human and minority rights and social dialogue from 2020 to 2022. A long-time member of the Democratic Party (DS), she was excluded from the party in 2020 after openly opposing its boycott of the 2020 Serbian parliamentary election.

== Early life and career ==
Čomić was born in Novi Sad, Vojvodina, in what was then the People's Republic of Serbia in the Federal People's Republic of Yugoslavia. She trained as a physicist and was employed at the University of Novi Sad's Faculty of Technical Sciences from 1984 to 1999. From 1999 to 2004, she worked in marketing for SPC Vojvodina.

Čomić was one of the first Serbian politicians to write a blog, starting in 2006.

== Politician ==
=== Early years (1992–2001) ===
Čomić joined the Democratic Party's Novi Sad municipal board in 1992 and afterward became a party spokesperson at the city and provincial levels. She led the DS's Novi Sad election headquarters in 1996 and was president of its Vojvodina provincial board in from 1998 to 2001.

Čomić appeared on the Democratic Party's electoral lists for the Novi Sad division in the 1992 and 1993 Serbian parliamentary elections, although she did not receive an assembly mandate on either occasion. (From 1992 to 2000, Serbia's electoral law stipulated that one-third of parliamentary mandates would be assigned to candidates on successful lists in numerical order while the remaining two-thirds would be distributed amongst other candidates at the discretion of sponsoring parties or coalitions. Čomić did not have a high enough list position in either 1992 or 1993 to receive an automatic mandate, nor was she granted an optional mandate afterwards.)

The DS contested the 1996 Yugoslavian parliamentary election as part of the Zajedno (English: Together) coalition, and Čomić appeared in the lead position on its electoral list for Zrenjanin. The list did not cross the electoral threshold to win any seats in the division. Čomić was, however, elected to the Vojvodina provincial assembly for Novi Sad's thirteenth division in the concurrent 1996 provincial election. The Socialist Party of Serbia (SPS) won a majority victory at the provincial level, and Čomić led the Zajedno opposition group in the assembly from 1997 to 2000. At the local level, she was a member of Novi Sad's executive committee in 1997, after Zajedno's victory in the city in the 1996 Serbian local elections.

In 2000, the DS became one of the main parties in the Democratic Opposition of Serbia (DOS), a broad and ideologically diverse coalition of parties opposed to Slobodan Milošević's authoritarian rule. DOS candidate Vojislav Koštunica defeated Milošević in the 2000 Yugoslavian presidential election, which led to Milošević's fall from power and prompted widespread changes in the political culture of Serbia and Yugoslavia. Čomić was re-elected for Novi Sad's tenth division in the 2000 Vojvodina provincial election, which took place concurrently with the presidential vote. The DOS won a landslide victory provincially, and Čomić served as a deputy speaker of the Vojvodina assembly from 2000 to 2001. She also appeared on the DOS's electoral list for the Yugoslavian Chamber of Republics in 2000, although she did not receive a mandate to serve in that legislature.

=== Parliamentarian ===
==== 2001–12 ====
Serbia's government fell after Milošević's defeat in the Yugoslavian election, and a new Serbian parliamentary election was called for December 2000. Serbia's electoral system was reformed prior to the vote, such that the entire country became a single at-large electoral division and all assembly mandates were assigned to candidates on successful lists at the discretion of the sponsoring parties or coalitions, irrespective of numerical order. Čomić received the twenty-first position on the DOS's electoral list. The list won a landslide majority victory with 176 out of 250 mandates, and she was included in the DS's delegation when the new assembly convened in January 2001. She became a party vice-president later in the year and served as a deputy speaker of the assembly.

In October 2003, Čomić controversially delayed a vote of no-confidence in the government of Zoran Živković, prompting some opposition members to charge that the delay was a method to give the government more time to build a working majority. Speaker Nataša Mićić ultimately dissolved the assembly for new elections on 13 November 2003. The Democratic Party contested the resulting 2003 parliamentary election at the head of its own alliance, and Čomić received the sixth position on its electoral list. The list won thirty-seven seats, and she was again included in the DS's assembly delegation. The rival Democratic Party of Serbia (DSS) formed a coalition government after the election, and the DS moved into opposition.

Čomić supported Živković against Boris Tadić for the vacant Democratic Party leadership in January 2004. It was reported that Tadić responded by blocking Čomić from becoming the new assembly speaker, a position she had expected to receive. Tadić was chosen as party leader in February 2004, and Čomić was defeated in her concurrent bid for re-election as a party vice-president. In her second parliamentary term, she chaired the foreign affairs committee and served on the committees for environmental protection and European integration. In 2006, she was appointed as part of Serbia's delegation to the Parliamentary Assembly of the Organization for Security and Co-operation in Europe (OSCE PA). She supported Serbia's integration into the European Union and criticized what she regarded as efforts to increase the country's dependence on Russia. In 2006, she worked with parliamentarians from Montenegro on a regional charter of minority rights.

She received the thirteenth position on the DS's list in the 2007 parliamentary election and was given a mandate for a third term after the list won sixty-four seats. The DS formed an unstable coalition government with the DSS and G17 Plus after the election, and Čomić served as part of its assembly majority. She was deputy chair of the environmental protection committee and continued to serve on the European integration committee.

The DS–DSS coalition broke down in early 2008, and a new parliamentary election was called for May of that year. The DS contested the election at the head of the For a European Serbia (ZES) alliance; Čomić was included on the ZES list and received a mandate for a fourth term after the list won 102 out of 250 seats. The overall results of the election were inconclusive, but ZES eventually formed a coalition government with the Socialist Party. When the assembly convened, Čomić was elected to a second term as deputy speaker. She was also a member of the foreign affairs committee, the European integration committee, and the working group on the rights of the child; a deputy member of the constitutional affairs committee and the poverty reduction committee; the leader of Serbia's parliamentary friendship group with Israel; and a member of the friendship groups with Indonesia, Portugal, the Sovereign Order of Malta, and the United States of America.

She supported the Statute of the Autonomous Province of Vojvodina in January 2009, saying that it was not a separatist document (as some had contended) and that it would benefit both Vojvodina and Serbia as a whole.

==== 2012–20 ====
Serbia's electoral system was again reformed in 2011, such that all parliamentary mandates were awarded to candidates on successful lists in numerical order. Čomić was given the fifteenth position on the Democratic Party's Choice for a Better Life coalition list in the 2012 election and was re-elected when the list won sixty-seven mandates. The SPS formed a new administration with the Serbian Progressive Party (SNS) and other parties after the election, and the DS moved into opposition. Čomić continued to serve as part of Serbia's delegation to the OSCE PA and was selected by that body as a rapporteur for human rights and migration. She was also a member of the national assembly committees for environmental protection, European integration, and the rights of the child; a deputy member of the committee on human and minority rights and gender equality; and a member of the friendship groups with Hungary, Israel, Mexico, Montenegro, the United Kingdom, and the United States.

In November 2013, Čomić headed an OSCE PA delegation overseeing the 2013 Tajikistani presidential election. She was critical of the way the vote was handled, saying, "While quiet and peaceful, this was an election without a real choice. Being in power requires abiding by OSCE commitments, not taking advantage of incumbency, as we saw here. Greater genuine political pluralism will be critical for Tajikistan to meet its democratic commitments." Čomić later advocated for the OSCE PA's Baku Declaration.

She received the sixth position on the DS's list in the 2014 parliamentary election and was re-elected even as the list fell to only nineteen mandates overall. In her sixth parliamentary term, she was a member of the European integration committee and the committee on the rights of the child, a deputy member of the environmental protection committee and the committee for human and minority rights and gender equality, and a member of the friendship groups with Croatia, Germany, Hungary, Ireland, Slovakia, the United Kingdom, and the United States. She ceased to be a full member of Serbia's OSCA PA delegation, becoming instead a deputy member. In June 2014, she was again elected as a DS vice-president.

She received the fifth position on the DS's list in the 2016 parliamentary election and was re-elected when the list won sixteen seats. In the parliament that followed, she was deputy chair of the committee on constitutional and legislative issues; a member of the committee on Kosovo-Metohija, the European integration committee, and the committee on the rights of the child; a deputy member of the environmental protection committee, the defence and internal affairs committee, and the European Union–Serbia stabilization and association committee; a member of a commission to "investigate the consequences of the NATO 1999 bombing on the health of the citizens of Serbia, as well as the environment, with a special focus on the impact of the depleted uranium projectiles"; a deputy member of the Serbia's delegation to the South-East European Cooperation Process parliamentary assembly; and a member of the parliamentary friendship groups with Albania, Bosnia and Herzegovina, Croatia, Germany, Israel, the United Kingdom, and the United States. She continued to serve as a deputy speaker of the assembly throughout the DS's years in opposition from 2012 to 2020.

Čomić was an early supporter of Saša Janković's candidacy in the 2017 Serbian presidential election. Janković was ultimately endorsed by the Democratic Party and finished a distant second against Aleksandar Vučić of the Progressive Party.

Čomić ran for the leadership of the Democratic Party in 2018 and finished second against Zoran Lutovac. During the campaign, it was noted that several DS members considered her to be ambivalent about the party's opposition to the Serbia's SNS-led administration and that some in the party took to nicknaming her "Vučić" on this basis.

The Democratic Party began boycotting the national assembly in early 2019, against the backdrop of significant public protests against Serbia's government. Čomić initially co-operated with the boycott, but in February 2020 she attended an assembly session against the party's wishes. She defended her decision on the grounds that her purpose was to present draft legislation requiring at least forty per cent female representation on election lists at the republican and municipal levels. (The legislation was approved, and Serbia's electoral laws were changed accordingly.)

Shortly after Čomić returned to the assembly, she took part in a press conference with representatives of the Serbia 21 party, who announced that they would participate in the 2020 parliamentary election despite broader calls for an opposition boycott. She was formally expelled from the DS in May 2020.

In the 2020 parliamentary election, Čomić appeared in the fourth position on the electoral list of the United Democratic Serbia (UDS) alliance, which was led by Serbia 21. A non-party candidate, she rejected suggestions that the UDS would join the SNS's coalition government after the election. The list did not cross the electoral threshold to win representation in the assembly, and her term ended on 3 August 2020.

=== Cabinet minister (2020–2022) ===
Čomić was appointed to prime minister Ana Brnabić's cabinet in October 2020 as minister of human and minority rights and social dialogue. While Brnabić's government was dominated by the SNS, Čomić served in a non-party capacity.

Čomić's main legislative initiative was an anti-discrimination law on same-sex partnerships, which she introduced in draft form in March 2021. The proposed legislation sought to extend civic rights to same-sex couples, though it did not address the subjects of marriage or adoption; Čomić contended that these were issues of family law, whereas her legislation was focused on human rights concerns. Even the limited rights extended to same-sex couples in the proposed legislation were met with vocal opposition from conservative circles.

Serbian president Aleksandar Vučić said that he would not sign the legislation on the grounds that it violated Serbia's constitution. Čomić sought to downplay the importance of Vučić's opposition, saying that the law's validity would ultimately be determined by Serbia's constitutional court. After the 2022 Serbian parliamentary election (in which she was not a candidate), she indicated that the draft law had been completed with the help of expert opinion from the Council of Europe and that it was ready for the mandate of Serbia's incoming government. Ultimately, though, the law was not introduced to the assembly at this time.

Čomić was dropped from cabinet in October 2022. She has not returned to political life since this time.

== Electoral record ==
=== Provincial (Vojvodina) ===
2000 Vojvodina provincial election: Novi Sad Division 10
Candidate	Party
Gordana Čomić (incumbent for Division 13) (***WINNER***)	Democratic Opposition of Serbia (Affiliation: Democratic Party)
Zoran Subotić	Serbian Radical Party
other candidates	
Total

1996 Vojvodina provincial election: Novi Sad Division 13
Candidate	Party
Gordana Čomić (***WINNER***)	Zajedno (Affiliation: Democratic Party)
other candidates	
Total

=== Leadership contests ===
DS leadership convention, 2 June 2018
Candidate	Party	Votes	%
Zoran Lutovac	Democratic Party	659	52.72
Gordana Čomić	Democratic Party	468	37.44
Branislav Lečić	Democratic Party	123	9.84
Total		1,250	100.00

== Notes ==
Political offices
Preceded by Milan Marković (2011–12)	Minister for Human and Minority Rights and Social Dialogue; 2020–2022	Succeeded by Tomislav Žigmanov
