= Mlađan Dinkić =

Serbian economist, musician and former politician

- Млађан Динкић
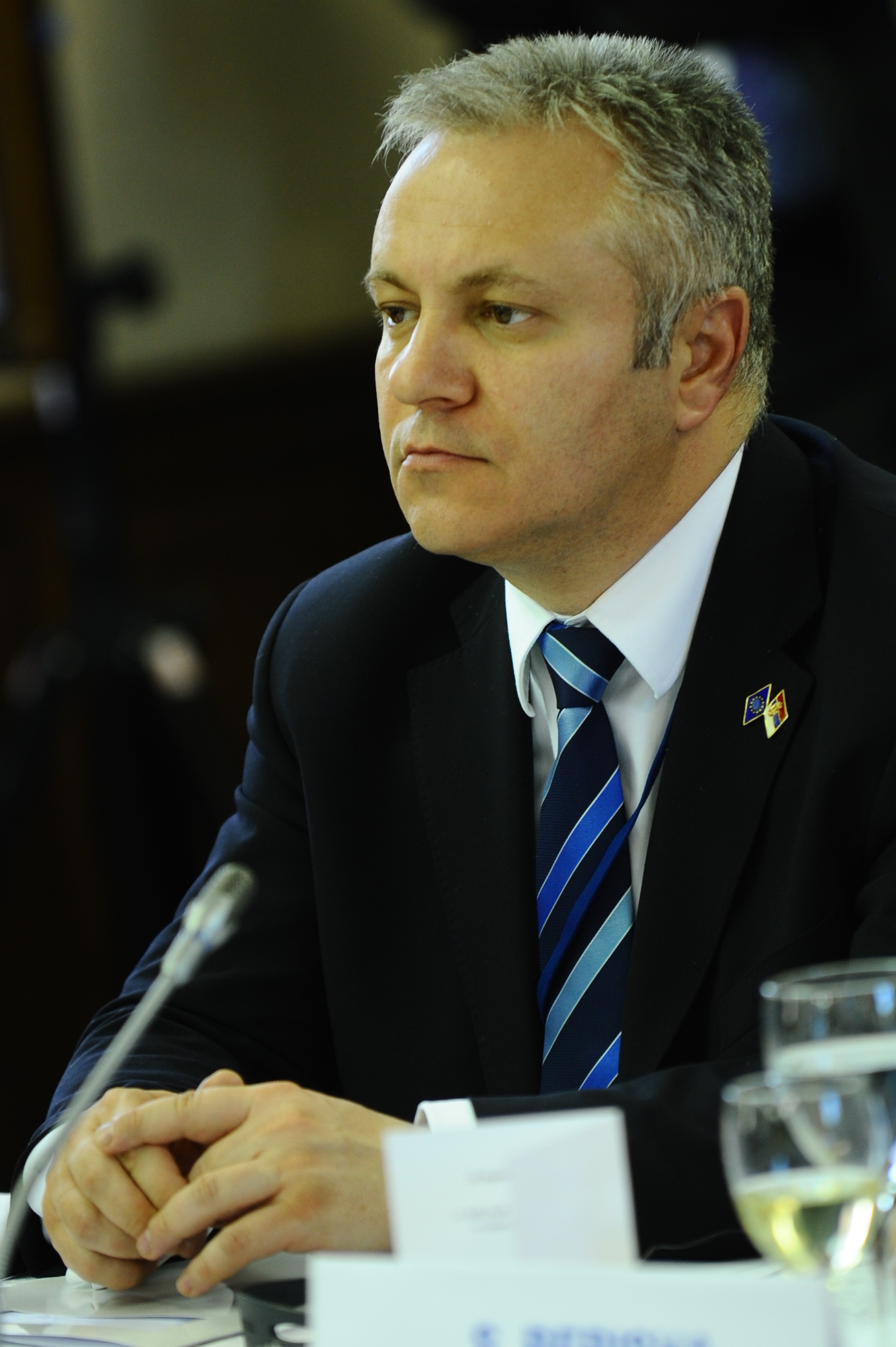
- Dinkić in 2011

Minister of Finance and Economy
- In office 27 July 2012 – 2 September 2013
- Preceded by: Mirko Cvetković (Finance); Nebojša Ćirić (Economy)
- Succeeded by: Lazar Krstić (Finance); Saša Radulović (Economy)

Deputy Prime Minister of Serbia
- In office 7 July 2008 – 22 February 2011
- Prime Minister: Mirko Cvetković
- Preceded by: Ivana Dulić Marković
- Succeeded by: Verica Kalanović

Minister of Economy and Regional Development
- In office 15 May 2007 – 22 February 2011
- Preceded by: Predrag Bubalo
- Succeeded by: Nebojša Ćirić

Minister of Finance
- In office 3 March 2004 – 9 November 2006
- Preceded by: Božidar Đelić
- Succeeded by: Mirko Cvetković

Governor of the National Bank of Serbia
- In office 4 February 2003 – 22 July 2003
- Nominated by: National Assembly of the Republic of Serbia
- Preceded by: Establishment function
- Succeeded by: Kori Udovički

Governor of the National Bank of Yugoslavia in Serbia and Montenegro
- In office 28 November 2000 – 2 February 2003
- Nominated by: Assembly of Yugoslavia
- Preceded by: Dušan Vlatković
- Succeeded by: Function canceled

Personal details
- Born: 20 December 1964 (age 61) Belgrade, SR Serbia, SFR Yugoslavia
- Party: G17+ (2002–2013); United Regions of Serbia (2013–2014)
- Education: University of Belgrade
- Occupation: Politician
- Profession: Economist
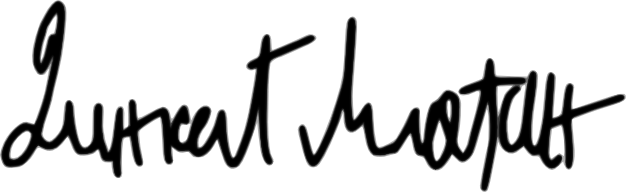
- Signature

Mlađan Dinkić (Note: Serbian Cyrillic: Млађан Динкић, pronounced [mlǎdʑan dîːŋkitɕ]) (born 20 December 1964) is a Serbian economist, musician and former politician.

He was the Governor of the National Bank of Yugoslavia in Serbia and Montenegro and later the National Bank of Serbia, serving from 2000 to 2003. He then served as the Minister of Finance from 2004 to 2006. He also served as the Minister of Economy and Regional Development and Deputy Prime Minister of Serbia from 2007 until his sacking in 2011. His last political post was as the Minister of Finance and Economy from 2012 to 2013. Following the 2014 parliamentary election, he announced his retirement from the politics.

== Early life and education ==
Dinkić was born in Belgrade, Serbia, Yugoslavia. He graduated from the First Economy highschool in Belgrade in 1983 and obtained his B.A. at the University of Belgrade Faculty of Economics in 1988 and his M.Sc. in 1993.

He has served as a teaching assistant for Theory and Planning of Economic Development at the University of Belgrade Faculty of Economics since 1994.

Dinkić's main fields of research are: high inflation and shadow financial markets, public sector deficits and its macroeconomic implications and measuring efficiency of resource use (on the macro and project level).

Dinkić is an avid guitar player and has his own rock band called "Monetary Coup".

== Political career ==
Mlađan Dinkić entered politics as a co-founder of the G17 Plus NGO in 1997. He later served as vice-president of the G17 Plus from 2003 to 2006 after it became a political party. Dinkić was elected leader of the G17 Plus in 2006 after incumbent leader Miroljub Labus stepped down.

Dinkić served as governor of the National Bank of Yugoslavia in Serbia and Montenegro and the National Bank of Serbia from 2000 to 2003, at age 36 he was the youngest governor of the bank in its history.

Dinkić received the 2007 award for Euromoney Finance Minister of the Year by Euromoney magazine. He received the 2009 award for Reformer of the Year for his contribution to the development of a climate conductive to business in Serbia and many others.

In 2014, following the 2014 parliamentary election and poor results of his party, he announced his retirement from politics.

== Notes ==
Government offices
| New office | Governor of the National Bank of Serbia; 2000–2003 | Succeeded by Kori Udovički |
| Preceded by Božidar Đelić | Minister of Finance; 2004–2006 | Succeeded by Mirko Cvetković |
| Preceded by Predrag Bubalo | Minister of Economy and Regional Development; 2007–2011 | Succeeded by Nebojša Ćirić |
| Preceded by Mirko Cvetković (Finance); Nebojša Ćirić (Economy) | Minister of Finance and Economy; 2012–2013 | Succeeded by Lazar Krstić (Finance); Saša Radulović (Economy) |
