= Alisa Marić =

Serbian chess player (born 1970)

- Алиса Марић
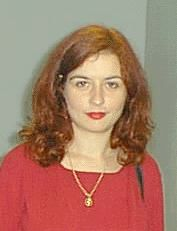

Minister of Youth and Sports
- In office 27 July 2012 – 2 September 2013
- Prime Minister: Ivica Dačić
- Preceded by: Verica Kalanović (Acting); Snežana Samardžić-Marković
- Succeeded by: Vanja Udovičić

Personal details
- Born: 10 January 1970 (age 56) New York City, New York, U.S.
- Party: Independent
- Children: Milica and Dušan
- Chess career
- Country: Serbia
- Title: International Master (1993); Woman Grandmaster (1988)
- FIDE rating: 2387 (January 2010)
- Peak rating: 2489 (July 1999)

Alisa Marić (Note: Serbian Cyrillic: Алиса Марић, pronounced [alǐsa mǎːritɕ]) (born 10 January 1970) is a Serbian chess player and politician who holds the FIDE titles of Woman Grandmaster (WGM) and International Master (IM). She was Minister of Youth and Sports from 2012 to 2013.

== Early career ==
Marić was introduced to chess at the age of four, together with her 20-minutes-younger twin sister Mirjana Marić. Marić and Mirjana are the only twins with Woman Grandmaster titles in the history of modern chess.

At the age of 12, Marić became national chess master and senior champion of Belgrade. At 15, she was FIDE Woman International Master (WIM) and World Junior Vice Champion Under 20 (World Junior Chess Championship Dobrna 1985.). At 16-year-old, she was the youngest ever winner of the Yugoslav Chess Championship, which was held in Pucarevo 1986. At the age of 18, Marić was awarded with the FIDE Woman Grandmaster (WGM) title. At 20, she was the third ranked female player at the World championship.

== World championship ==
In 1990, Marić won the Candidates Tournament for the Women's World Chess Championship in Borjomi, Georgia, USSR (together with Xie Jun). In 1991, Alisa Marić and Xie Jun played the final challenger match in two parts; first in Belgrade, Yugoslavia, second in Beijing, China. Chinese Xie Jun won 4,5:2,5 and later that year became the Women's World Chess Champion by defeating Maya Chiburdanidze of USSR. In 1992, Alisa Marić shared 4–5. place at Candidates Tournament in Shanghai, China. In 1994, she tied for 4–5. place at the Candidates Tournament in Tilburg, Nederlands. In 1997, she shared 5–7.place at the Candidates Tournament in Groningen, Nederlands. Starting from the year 2000, the FIDE World Chess Championship is based on a knock-out format. In New Delhi, India 2000, Alisa Marić played the semifinal match against Chinese Qin Kanying. In Moscow, Russia 2001, she played 3rd round against Chinese Zhu Chen, who then became Women's World chess champion. These results were achieved in six consecutive World championship cycles.

== Medals ==
Alisa Marić
Medal record

Women's Chess

Representing Yugoslavia

Chess Olympiad
Bronze medal – third place	1988 Thessaloniki	

Representing Yugoslavia

Chess Olympiad
Bronze medal – third place	1998 Elista	

European Team Championship
Silver medal – second place	1999 Batumi	

Starting from 1986, Marić holds the leading player role in national chess selection. She won the bronze team's medal at the Chess Olympiad in Thessalonica 1988, and the individual bronze medal at the Chess Olympiad in Elista 1998. She won the silver medal at the European Team Chess Championship in Batumi 1999. In Shanghai 2001, Alisa Marić played for six members "Rest of the World team" in an exhibition match against China. In Belgrade 2007, she was awarded the prestigious "St. Sava prize" for the 20 year jubilee as a member of national team. She played first board on ten Chess Olympiads (Dubai 1986, Thessalonica 1988, Novi Sad 1990, Moscow 1994, Yerevan 1996, Elista 1998, Istanbul 2000, Calvià 2004, Torino 2006 and Dresden 2008) and five European Team Championships (Batumi 1999, Leon 2001, Plovdiv 2003, Gothenburg 2005 and Novi Sad 2009). Three times Alisa Marić won European Chess Club Cup with "Agrouniverzal" club from Belgrade.

== Personal life and other activities ==
Marić has a Ph.D. in economics, and she is working as marketing professor on the faculty of culture and media at Megatrend University in Belgrade. She is co-author of students books Principles of Marketing and Media Marketing. She was a member of Presidential Board of the Serbian Olympic Committee. She has anchored TV chess shows such as Alisa in the Wonderland of Chess.

Marić is the mother of fraternal twins, Milica and Dušan.

== Selected game ==
Anand vs. Marić, Lugano 1988

Position: h1 white king, e1 white rook, c1 white rook, h2 white pawn, g2 white pawn, a2 white pawn, c3 black pawn, h4 white queen, f4 white pawn, e4 white knight, d4 black rook, e5 white pawn, d5 black knight, a5 black pawn, g6 black pawn, e6 black pawn, a6 black queen, h7 black pawn, f7 black pawn, g8 black king, c8 black rook

Position after 40.Ree1

This game is Marić's win against future World Chess Champion Viswanathan Anand. It was played in Lugano, Switzerland, at "Lugano Open" tournament 1988.

Anand (2520) vs. Marić (2345); Sicilian Defence (ECO B46)
1.e4 c5 2.Nf3 Nc6 3.d4 cxd4 4.Nxd4 Qc7 5.Nc3 e6 6.f4 a6 7.Nxc6 bxc6 8.Bd3 d5 9.0-0 Nf6 10.e5 Nd7 11.b3 Nc5 12.Kh1 Be7 13.Qh5 g6 14.Qh6 Bf8 15.Qh3 a5 16.Be3 Ba6 17.Rfd1 Be7 18.Qh6 Bf8 19.Qh4 Be7 20.Qf2 Nd7 21.Qe2 Qc8 22.Na4 c5 23.Bd2 Bxd3 24.cxd3 0-0 25.Rac1 Qa6 26.Be3 Rac8 27.Rd2 Qb5 28.Rdc2 Rc6 29.Bf2 Rfc8 30.Qe3 c4 31.Nc3 Qa6 32.bxc4 dxc4 33.d4 Nb6 34.Qf3 R6c7 35.Qh3 Rd7 36.Bh4 Bxh4 37.Qxh4 Rxd4 38.Re2 Nd5 39.Ne4 c3 40.Ree1 Qd3 41.Rxc3 Rxc3 42.Qd8+ Kg7 43.Nf6 Nxf6 44.exf6+ Kh6 45.Qf8+ Kh5 46.Qxf7 Rxf4 47.Re5+ Rf5 48.Qxh7+ Kg5 49.h4+ Kxf6 0–1

Government offices
Preceded by Verica Kalanović (Acting); Snežana Samardžić-Marković	Minister of Youth and Sports of Serbia; 2012 – 2013	Succeeded by Vanja Udovičić
