= Nela Kuburović =

Serbian lawyer and politician

- Нела Кубуровић
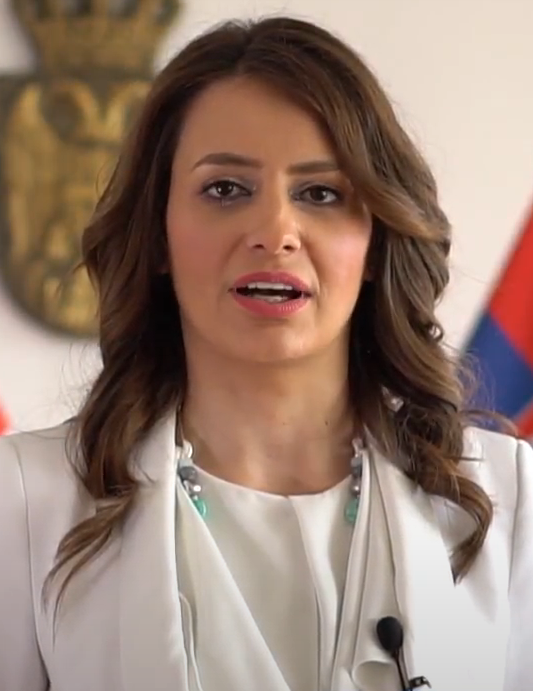
- Kuburović in 2018

Minister of Justice
- In office 11 August 2016 – 28 October 2020
- Prime Minister: Aleksandar Vučić; Ivica Dačić (Acting); Ana Brnabić
- Preceded by: Nikola Selaković
- Succeeded by: Maja Popović

Personal details
- Born: 7 April 1982 (age 44) Sarajevo, SFR Yugoslavia
- Party: Serbian Progressive Party
- Education: University of Belgrade
- Occupation: Lawyer, politician

Nela Kuburović (Serbian Cyrillic: Нела Кубуровић, born 7 April 1982) is a Serbian lawyer and politician. She served as the Minister of Justice in the Government of Serbia from 2016 to 2020. Before the appointment, she was Deputy Minister of Justice in the Department of Justice.

== Education and career ==
She finished primary and secondary school in Belgrade. In 2005, she graduated from the University of Belgrade, and passed the professional law exam in 2008.

From 2006, she worked as an assistant judge in the First Belgrade Court, and from 2008 until 2009 as a clerk in the Ministry of Justice. Then she moved to the High Council of Judiciary, as part of the Department of Legislation and from 2013 as part of the Department of The Status of Judges. In 2014, she became Deputy to Minister of Justice Nikola Selaković. In 2016, she became the Minister of Justice in the second cabinet of Aleksandar Vučić.

In February 2017, the Prime Minister of Serbia Aleksandar Vučić decided to run for the 2017 Serbian presidential elections. He won the elections in the first round and was sworn as the President of Serbia on 31 May 2017. Weeks later, he gave mandate to Ana Brnabić to form the governmental cabinet. On 29 June 2017, the cabinet of Ana Brnabić was formed, with Kuburović keeping her office. In November 2017, she joined the Chairmanship Board of the Serbian Progressive Party (SNS).

Political offices
Preceded by Nikola Selaković	Minister of Justice of Serbia; 2016–2020	Succeeded by Maja Popović
