= Svetozar Čiplić =

Serbian politician (born 1965)

- Светозар Чиплић
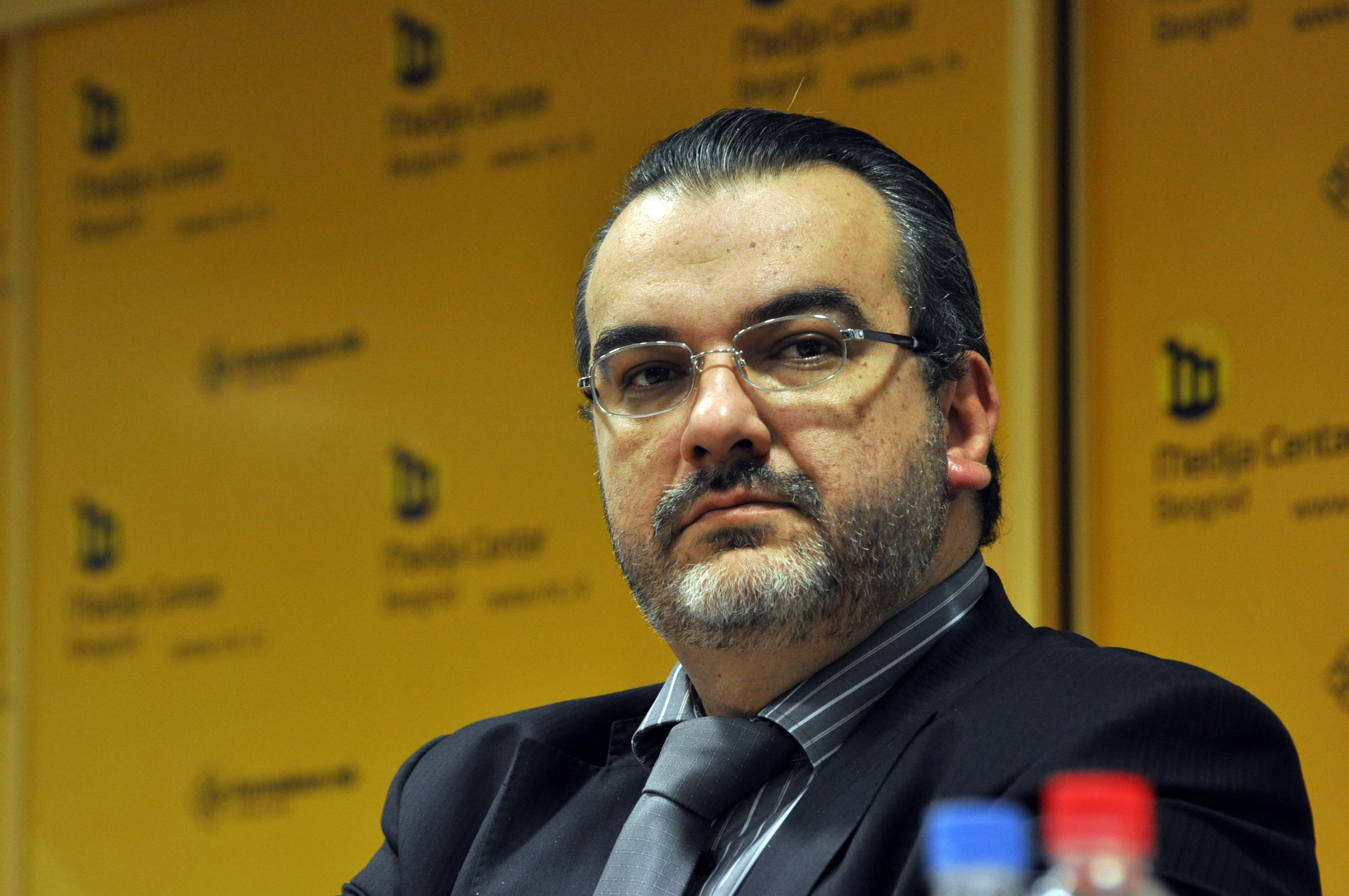

Minister of Human and Minority Rights
- In office 7 July 2008 – 14 March 2011
- Prime Minister: Mirko Cvetković
- Preceded by: Position established
- Succeeded by: Milan Marković (Merged into Ministry of Human and Minority Rights, Public Administration and Local Self-Government)

Personal details
- Born: 21 April 1965 (age 60) Novi Sad, Yugoslavia (now Serbia)
- Children: 2
- Education: Faculty of Law
- Alma mater: University of Novi Sad
- Occupation: Politician

Svetozar Čiplić (Serbian Cyrillic: Светозар Чиплић, born 21 April 1965) is a Serbian politician. He served as the Minister of Human and Minority Rights from 2008 to 2011.

== Education and career ==
Born in Novi Sad in 1965, he graduated from the University of Novi Sad Faculty of Law, where he also received a master's degree. He has been employed at the school since 1995, where he teaches constitutional law.

He was a member of the Novi Sad Executive Council, in charge of administration and regulations in 2001. From 2002 to 2007, he served on the bench of the Serbian Constitutional Court. From 7 July 2008 to 14 March 2011, he was the Minister of Human and Minority Rights, until his Ministry merged into Ministry of State Administration and Local Self-Government.

Čiplić publicly stated that minority ethnic group voter registration went smoothly despite widespread allegations of fraud.

== Personal life ==
He is married, and has two children.

Political offices
Preceded by Position established	Minister of Human and Minority Rights; 2008–2011	Succeeded by Milan Marković (Merged into Ministry of Human and Minority Rights, Public Administration and Local Self-Government)
