= Gordana Pop Lazić =

Serbian politician (born 1956)

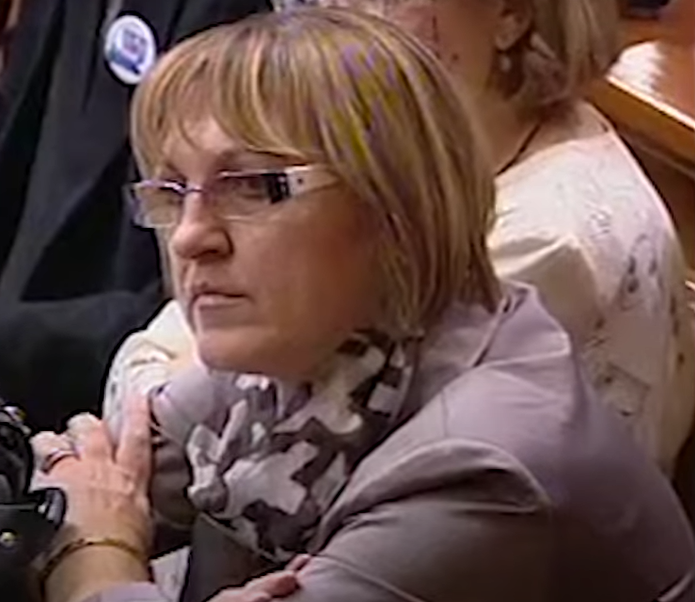
Gordana Pop Lazić in National Assembly during a shoe throwing incident, 26.11.2009

Gordana Pop Lazić (also rendered as: Gordana Pop-Lazić; Serbian Cyrillic: Гордана Поп Лазић; born 5 April 1956), is a former politician in Serbia. She was at one time a prominent figure in the far-right Serbian Radical Party, serving at different times as a cabinet minister, a member of the National Assembly of Serbia, and mayor of the Belgrade municipality of Zemun.

== Early life and private career ==
Pop Lazić was born in Belgrade, in what was then the People's Republic of Serbia in the Federal People's Republic of Yugoslavia. She is a graduate of the University of Belgrade Faculty of Law. She worked for the municipal assembly of Zemun in the 1990s, serving as secretary of the assembly from 1996 to 1998.

== Politician ==
=== Cabinet minister ===
Serbian and Yugoslavian politics in the 1990s were dominated by the Socialist Party of Serbia under the authoritarian rule of Slobodan Milošević. On 24 March 1998, during the early period of the Kosovo War, the Socialists formed a coalition government in Serbia that also included the Radicals and the Yugoslav Left. Pop Lazić was appointed to cabinet as a representative of the Radical Party, serving for two-and-a-half years as minister of public administration and local self-government in the government of Mirko Marjanović.

Pop Lazić stood down from cabinet on 24 October 2000, following Slobodan Milošević's defeat in the 2000 Yugoslavian presidential election, an event that precipitated a broad transformation of Serbian and Yugoslavian politics. She was also defeated in her bid for election to the Chamber of Citizens in the Assembly of the Federal Republic of Yugoslavia in the concurrent parliamentary election.

She sought election to the City Assembly of Belgrade in the 2000 Serbian local elections, running in Zemun's seventh division, and was defeated by Miloš Milutinović of the Democratic Opposition of Serbia (DOS).

=== Parliamentarian ===
Following Milošević's defeat in the Yugoslavian presidential election, a new Serbian parliamentary election was called for December 2000. The entire country was counted a single electoral division; Pop Lazić was given the twenty-third position on the Radical Party's list and was awarded a mandate when the list won twenty-three seats. (From 2000 to 2011, mandates in Serbian parliamentary elections were awarded to sponsoring parties or coalitions rather than individual candidates, and it was common practice for the mandates to be assigned out of numerical order. Pop Lazić's specific position on the list had no bearing on whether or not she received a mandate.) The DOS won a landslide victory in the election, and the Radicals served in opposition.

Pop Lazić was promoted to the symbolically significant fourth position on the Radical Party's list in the 2003 parliamentary election. The list won eighty-two out of 250 mandates, and she was again selected for her party's assembly delegation. Although the Radicals won more seats than any other party, they fell well short of a majority and continued to serve in opposition. Pop Lazić was chosen as a vice-president (i.e., deputy speaker) of the assembly in February 2004. She was also a member of Serbia's delegation to the Parliamentary Assembly of the Council of Europe (PACE) from June 2006 to June 2007.

Pop Lazić again appeared in the fourth position on the Radical Party's list in both the 2007 and 2008 parliamentary elections. She did not receive a mandate on the former occasion but did so on the latter. While the results of the 2008 election were initially inconclusive, the For a European Serbia alliance ultimately formed a new coalition government with the Socialists, and the Radicals again served in opposition.

The Radical Party experienced a serious split later in 2008, with several members joining the more moderate Serbian Progressive Party under the leadership of Tomislav Nikolić and Aleksandar Vučić. Pop Lazić remained with the Radicals.

She served as deputy leader of the Radical Party's parliamentary group from 2008 to October 2009, when she was replaced by Aleksandar Martinović. In November 2009, she attracted some notoriety by throwing a shoe at Democratic Party parliamentarian Gordana Čomić, who was then chairing a legislative debate. She did not seek re-election in 2012 and has not sought a return to the assembly since then.

=== City of Belgrade ===
Pop Lazić was given the second position on the Radical Party's list for the City Assembly of Belgrade in the 2004 Serbian local elections and was elected when the list won twenty-seven seats. The Radicals served in opposition after the election. She was not a candidate at the city level in 2008.

She led the Radical Party's list for the Zemun municipal assembly election in 2004, which was held concurrently with the city election. The Radicals won a plurality victory with twenty-six out of fifty-seven seats, and Pop Lazić was subsequently chosen as mayor with support from the Socialists and the Strength of Serbia Movement. She served in this role in the next four years. She again led the Radical list to a narrow victory in Zemun in the 2008 local elections, although she neither continued as mayor nor took a seat in the local assembly afterwards.

The Radicals initially continued in power in Zemun after the 2008 election, but subsequent political upheaval (including the late 2008 split in the Radical Party) led to new municipal elections taking place in 2009. Pop Lazić received the third position on the Radical list and was given a mandate when the list finished in third place with six seats. She did not seek re-election in 2013 and has not returned to political life since this time.

== Electoral record ==
=== Local (City Assembly of Belgrade) ===
2000 City of Belgrade election Zemun Division VII
Dušan Jaksimović	Socialist Party of Serbia–Yugoslav Left	
Milan Lazarević	Serbian Renewal Movement	
Miloš Milutinović	Democratic Opposition of Serbia	Elected
Gordana Pop Lazić	Serbian Radical Party	
