= Ministry of Human and Minority Rights and Social Dialogue (Serbia) =

Government ministry of Serbia

- Министарство за људска и мањинска права и друштвени дијалог Ministarstvo za ljudska i manjinska prava i društveni dijalog

Ministry overview
- Formed: 7 July 2008
- Superseding Ministry: Ministry of State Administration and Local Self-Government
- Jurisdiction: Government of Serbia
- Headquarters: Palace of Serbia, Bulevar Mihajla Pupina 2, Belgrade
- Minister responsible: Demo Beriša
- Website: minljmpdd.gov.rs

The Ministry of Human and Minority Rights and Social Dialogue (Serbian: Министарство за људска и мањинска права и друштвени дијалог, romanized: Ministarstvo za ljudska i manjinska prava i društveni dijalog) is a ministry in the Government of Serbia which is in charge of human and minority rights. The ministry merged into the Ministry of State Administration and Local Self-Government on 14 March 2011 and was re-instated again under the Second cabinet of Ana Brnabić in 2020.

== List of ministers ==
Political Party: DS n-p DSHV

No.	Portrait	Minister	Took office	Left office	Time in office	Party	Cabinet
Minister of Human and Minority Rights
1	Svetozar Čiplić	Svetozar Čiplić (born 1965)	7 July 2008	14 March 2011	2 years, 250 days	DS	Cvetković
Minister of Human and Minority Rights, Public Administration, and Local Self-Government
2	Milan Marković	Milan Marković (born 1970)	14 March 2011	27 July 2012	1 year, 135 days	DS	Cvetković
Minister of Human and Minority Rights and Social Dialogue
3	Gordana Čomić	Gordana Čomić (born 1958)	28 October 2020	26 October 2022	1 year, 363 days	Independent	Brnabić II
4	Tomislav Žigmanov	Tomislav Žigmanov (born 1967)	26 October 2022	16 April 2025	2 years, 172 days	DSHV	Brnabić III; Vučević
5	Demo Beriša	Demo Beriša (born 1963)	16 April 2025	Incumbent	1 year, 114 days	Independent	Macut

== See also ==
- Human rights in Serbia
