= Nebojša Ćirić =

- Небојша Ћирић

Minister of Economy and Regional Development
- In office 14 March 2011 – 27 July 2012
- Preceded by: Mlađan Dinkić
- Succeeded by: Mlađan Dinkić (Economy); Verica Kalanović (Regional Development)

Personal details
- Born: 12 January 1974 (age 52) Bor, SR Serbia, SFR Yugoslavia
- Party: G17 Plus

Nebojša Ćirić (Serbian Cyrillic: Небојша Ћирић) is the former Minister of Economy and Regional Development in the Government of the Republic of Serbia. He is a member of the G17 Plus political party.

He was born in 1974 in Bor. He graduated from the University of Belgrade Faculty of Economics.

From 1996 to 1997 he was a Junior Account Manager at the Belgrade Ogilvy & Mather. Between 1997 and 2001 he was an expert consultant at the Economy Institute in Belgrade. In 2001-2002 he was a special adviser for foreign investments to the Ministry for Foreign Economic Relations, under the Government of Zoran Đinđić. In 2002-2007 he was the CEO for financial consulting in Deloitte & Touche. In 2007-2008 he was an assistant assigned for Economic Affairs and Privatization in the Ministry of Economy and Regional Development during Vojislav Koštunica's second term in office. From July 2008 to May 2011 he was the State Secretary in the Ministry of Economy and Regional Development; during the major governmental restructuring after the political clash between G17 Plus and the Democratic Party, he was promoted to and replaced Mlađan Dinkić as Minister of Economy and Regional Development, serving that position ever since.

He speaks English.

Government offices
Preceded by Mlađan Dinkić	Minister of Economy and Regional Development; 2011 – 2012	Succeeded by Mlađan Dinkić (Economy); Verica Kalanović (Regional Development)
