= Snežana Samardžić-Marković =

Serbian politician

- Снежана Самарџић-Марковић
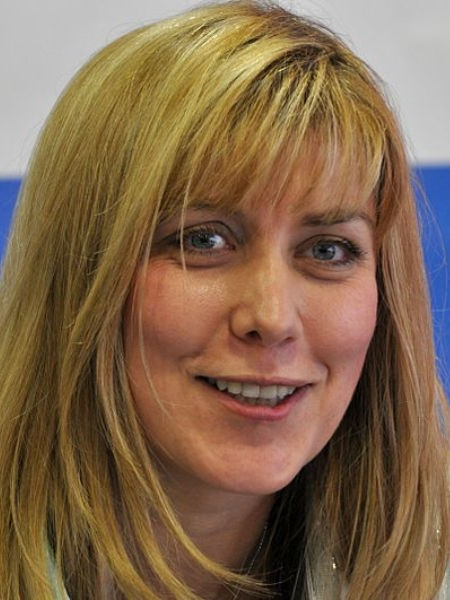
- Snežana Samardžić-Marković

Minister of Youth and Sports
- In office 15 May 2007 – 8 February 2012
- Succeeded by: Verica Kalanović (Acting); Alisa Marić

Minister of National Investment Plan (Acting)
- In office 21 February 2011 – 14 March 2011
- Preceded by: Verica Kalanović
- Succeeded by: Post abolished (Merged into Ministry of Economy and Regional Development)

Personal details
- Born: 10 March 1966 (age 60) Belgrade, Serbia, SFR Yugoslavia
- Party: G17 Plus
- Occupation: Politician

Snežana Samardžić-Marković (Note: Serbian Cyrillic: Снежана Самарџић-Марковић, pronounced [sněʒana sǎmardʒitɕ mǎːrkoʋitɕ]) (born 10 March 1966) is a Serbian politician. She was the Director General of Democracy at the Council of Europe. The Directorate General oversees 50 conventions, consists of over 700 staff members, it is composed of 4 Directorates, 10 Partial agreements, 32 intergovernmental structures and 7 monitoring mechanisms. The topics range from anti-discrimination, education, youth participation, good governance and gender equality, to sport, culture, work with civil society and the World Forum for Democracy. She served as the Minister of Youth and Sports in Serbian government from 2007 to 2012.

== Biography ==
Samardžić-Marković graduated from the University of Belgrade Faculty of Philology and has further academic credentials from the University of Oslo and JF Kennedy School of Government at Harvard University. In the period 2005–2007 she was Assistant Minister of Defence and was in charge of strategic planning, international military cooperation and the Verification Centre, as well as co-president of the Serbia-NATO Defence Reform Group. From 2001 to 2005, she worked in the bilateral department at the Ministry of Foreign Affairs as deputy director for Neighbouring Countries, Deputy Head of Mission and Adviser at the Serbia and Montenegro's Embassy in Oslo and Adviser at the Directorate for Europe.

During her mandate as the Minister of Sport, Serbia obtained a new Law on Sports, the National Youth Strategy was adopted, 120 offices for youth were opened locally, and Samardžić-Marković personally was particularly proud of the Young Talent Fund that awarded scholarships to thousands of Serbia's most talented pupils and students.

Between 2015 and 2016, Samardžić-Marković served on the European Union’s High Level Group on Sport Diplomacy, which had been established by European Commissioner for Education, Culture, Multilingualism and Youth Tibor Navracsics and was chaired by IOC member and former President of the Hungarian Republic Pál Schmitt.

Roma rights, gender equality, ethical and inclusive sport, are just some of the issues to which Samardžić-Marković has been particularly devoted in her function as Director General of Democracy at the Council of Europe, and which she has promoted including through a series of articles written for New Europe.

In addition to her work at the Council of Europe, Samardžić-Marković currently holds the following positions: President of the Jury for the Social Cohesion Award] of the Council of Europe Development Bank, Paris; Member of the Board of the European Institute of Roma Arts and Culture, Berlin; Member of the Board of the European Partial Agreement on Cultural Routes, Luxembourg; Member of the Board of the UEFA Foundation for Children, Nyon; Chair of ASOIF Governance Task Force, Lausanne. She is also the Senior Independent Expert leading the Initial Human Rights Impact Assessment to evaluate the intersection between the World Anti-Doping Program and the human rights of athletes for the World Anti-Doping Agency (WADA).

Samardžić-Marković previously held the following positions: Member of the Foundation Board of WADA, Montreal; Member of the Board of the European Wergeland Centre, Oslo; Member of the High Level Group on Sport Diplomacy, Brussels.

Samardžić-Marković has been awarded the Grand Knight of the CISM Order of Merit, as well as the traditional “May award” for the outstanding achievements for Serbian sport, 2011.

Married to Serbian author Veselin Marković, with two children (son Damjan, daughter Ema), she is fluent in English and Norwegian, speaks French and has a working knowledge of Russian.

== Notes ==
Government offices
Preceded by Post created	Minister of Youth and Sports; 2007–2012	Succeeded by Verica Kalanović (Acting); Alisa Marić
