= Zoran Lončar =

Serbian politician (born 1965)

- Зоран Лончар
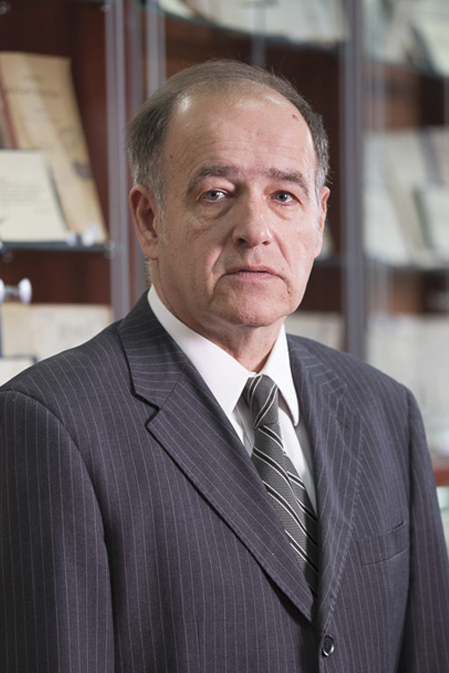

Minister of Education
- In office 15 May 2007 – 7 July 2008
- Preceded by: Slobodan Vuksanović
- Succeeded by: Žarko Obradović

Minister of Public Administration and Local Self-Government
- In office 3 March 2004 – 15 May 2007
- Preceded by: Rodoljub Šabić
- Succeeded by: Milan Marković

Personal details
- Born: 12 November 1965 (age 60) Novi Sad, Serbia, SFR Yugoslavia
- Party: Democratic Party of Serbia

Zoran Lončar (Serbian Cyrillic: Зоран Лончар; born 1965) is a Serbian politician and a university professor. He served as Minister of Public Administration and Local Self-Government from 2004 to 2007, and as Minister of Education from 2007 to 2008.

He holds a PhD in Law. In 2000, he joined the Democratic Party of Serbia. He served as a legal adviser in a commission that drafted the Constitutional Charter of Serbia and Montenegro and in the drafting of a new Constitution of Serbia.

== Personal life ==
He is married and has two children.

Preceded by Rodoljub Šabić	Minister of Public Administration and Local Self-Government; 2004 – 2007	Succeeded by Milan Marković
Preceded by Slobodan Vuksanović	Minister of Education; 2007 – 2008	Succeeded by Žarko Obradović
