= Ministry of National Investment Plan (Serbia) =

- Министарство за Национални инвестициони план Ministarstvo za Nacionalni investicioni plan

Ministry overview
- Formed: 7 July 2008
- Dissolved: 14 March 2011
- Superseding Ministry: Ministry of Economy and Regional Development
- Jurisdiction: Government of Serbia

The Ministry of National Investment Plan of the Republic of Serbia (Serbian: Министарство за Национални инвестициони план / Ministarstvo za Nacionalni investicioni plan) was the ministry in the Government of Serbia. The ministry was merged into the Ministry of Economy and Regional Development on 14 March 2011.

== History ==
After the dissolution of the Ministry of Foreign Economic Relations (merged into the Ministry of Economy and Regional Development), the Government of Serbia established one position - minister without portfolio who was in the charge of National Investment Plan, with Dragan Đilas as minister responsible.

The Ministry of National Investment Plan was officially established one year later, on 7 July 2008. It took some of the jurisdictions of former Ministry of Foreign Economic Relations. The Ministry later merged into the Ministry of Economy and Regional Development on 14 March 2011.

== List of ministers ==
Political Party: DS G17 Plus

Name (Birth–Death)	Party	Term of Office		Prime Minister (Cabinet)
Dragan Đilas (1967–); Minister-Coordinator	DS	15 May 2007	7 July 2008	Koštunica (II)
Verica Kalanović (1954–)	G17 Plus	7 July 2008	21 February 2011	Cvetković (I)
Snežana Samardžić-Marković (1966–); Acting Minister	G17 Plus	21 February 2011	14 March 2011	Cvetković (I)
