= Kori Udovički =

Serbian economist

Kori Udovički PhD
- Кори Удовички
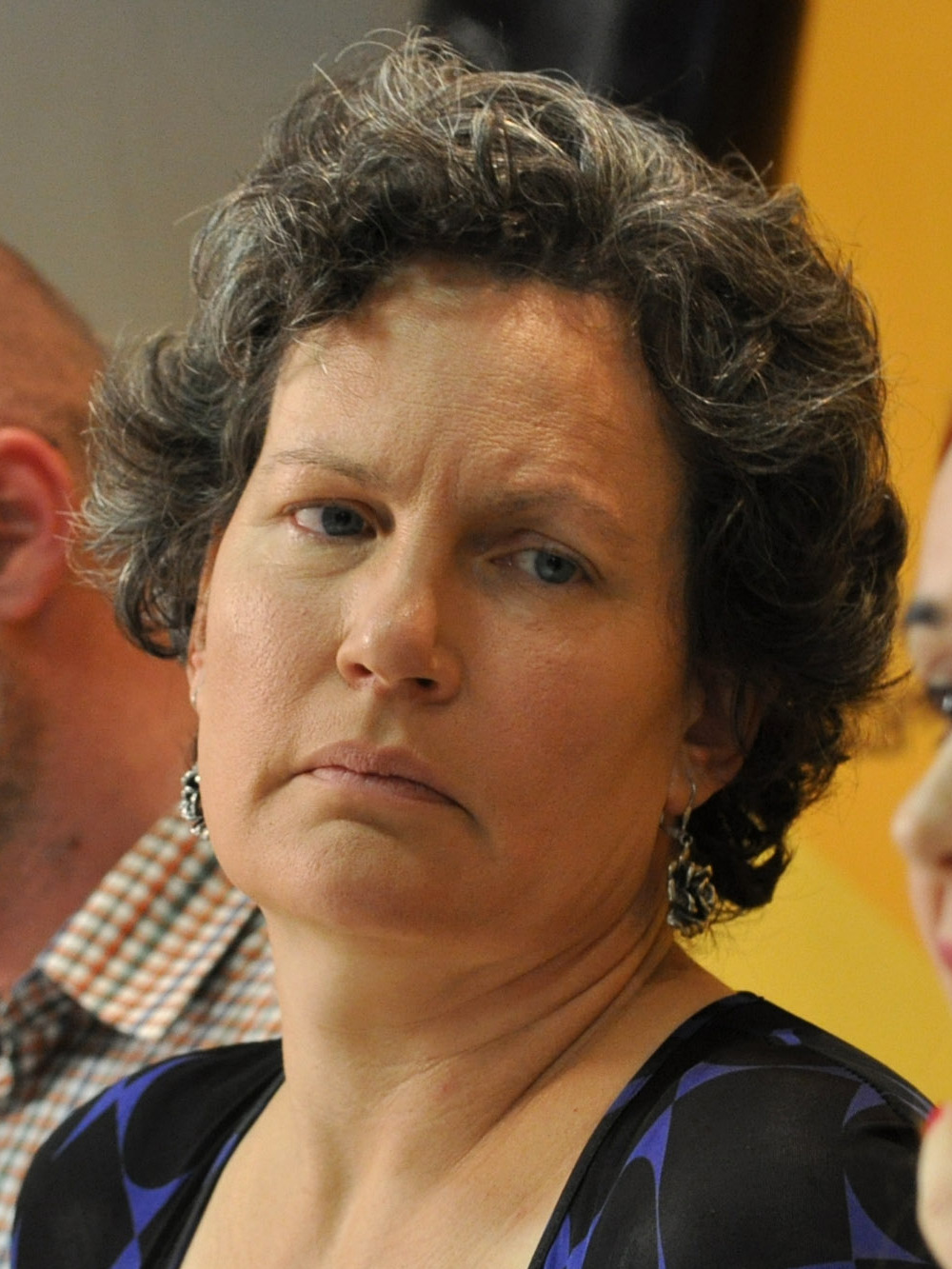
- Udovički in 2013

Deputy Prime Minister of Government of Serbia
- In office 27 April 2014 – 11 August 2016
- Preceded by: Suzana Grubješić
- Succeeded by: Nebojša Stefanović

Minister of Public Administration and Local Self-Government
- In office 27 April 2014 – 11 August 2016
- Preceded by: Nikola Selaković (Public Administration); Igor Mirović (Local Self-Government)
- Succeeded by: Ana Brnabić

Assistant Secretary-General of United Nations, Director of the Regional Bureau of UNDP for Europe and CIS and Assistant Administrator of UNDP
- In office 1 February 2007 – 22 February 2012
- Preceded by: Kalman Mizsei
- Succeeded by: Cihan Sultanoğlu

Governor of the National Bank of Serbia
- In office 22 July 2003 – 1 March 2004
- Preceded by: Mlađan Dinkić
- Succeeded by: Radovan Jelašić

Minister of Mining and Energy
- In office 19 June 2002 – 22 July 2003
- Preceded by: Goran Novaković
- Succeeded by: Radomir Naumov

Personal details
- Born: 4 December 1961 (age 64) La Paz, Bolivia
- Education: BEcon University of Belgrade, MA and PhD Yale University
- Profession: Economist

Kori Udovički (Note: Serbian Cyrillic: Кори Удовички, pronounced [kôri udoʋǐtʃkiː]) (born 4 December 1961) is a Serbian former politician. An independent politician, she previously served as deputy prime minister of Serbia and minister of public administration and local self-government from 2014 to 2016, Governor of the National Bank of Serbia from 2003 to 2004, and minister of mining and energy from 2002 to 2003.

Prior to that position, she served as an Assistant Secretary-General of the United Nations, Assistant Administrator of the UNDP and Director of the Regional Bureau of UNDP for Europe and Commonwealth of Independent States (RBEC) from 2007 to 2012.

Previously she was the founder and the President of the Center for Advanced Economic Studies (CEVES), a Belgrade NGO that works for the advancement of economic research and education in South East Europe. She was also President of the Board of Directors of the Foundation for the Advancement of Economics (FREN). CEVES's main publication is Quarterly Monitor of Economic Trends and Policies in Serbia, a publication that systematically monitors macroeconomic, corporate and financial trends and policies in Serbia. It comes out in Serbian and English and is also posted on the CEVES and FREN websites. Kori Udovički was the Editor in Chief until February 2007.

== Personal life ==
Kori was born in La Paz (Bolivia) to a Serbian father and a Bolivian mother. She is married and has three children. Her maternal uncle is former President of Bolivia Gonzalo Sánchez de Lozada. Her father Lazar Udovički was a politician in SFR Yugoslavia who served as ambassador in Uruguay and volunteer in Spanish Civil War. Kori is the sister-in-law of actor Rade Šerbedžija as he is married to her sister Lenka.

== Education and political career ==
She graduated from the University of Belgrade Faculty of Economics in 1984 she obtained an MA (1988) and a PhD (1999) in Economics from Yale University. She researched inter-regional trade and integration between the republics of the former Yugoslavia. More recently, she has studied the sustainability of Serbia's macroeconomic framework. From 1993 to 2001, she worked at the IMF in Washington, D.C., and then returned to Belgrade as Special Advisor to the Serbian Minister of Finance and Economic Affairs. In 2002, she became Minister of Energy and Mining in Serbian Government. She was appointed Governor of the National Bank of Serbia on July 23, 2003, a position she held until February 25, 2004, when her appointment was annulled due to the illegal use of a proxy vote in the Serbian parliament.

Political offices
Preceded by Goran Novaković	Minister of Mining and Energy of Serbia; 2002–2003	Succeeded by Radomir Naumov
Preceded by Mlađan Dinkić	Governor of the National Bank of Serbia; 2003–2004	Succeeded by Radovan Jelašić
Preceded by Nikola Selaković (Public Administration) Igor Mirović (Local Self-Government)	Minister of Public Administration and Local Self-Government; 2014–2016	Succeeded by Ana Brnabić
Preceded by Suzana Grubješić	Deputy Prime Minister of Serbia; 2014–2016	Succeeded by Nebojša Stefanović
