= Igor Mirović =

Serbian politician (born 1968)

- Игор Мировић
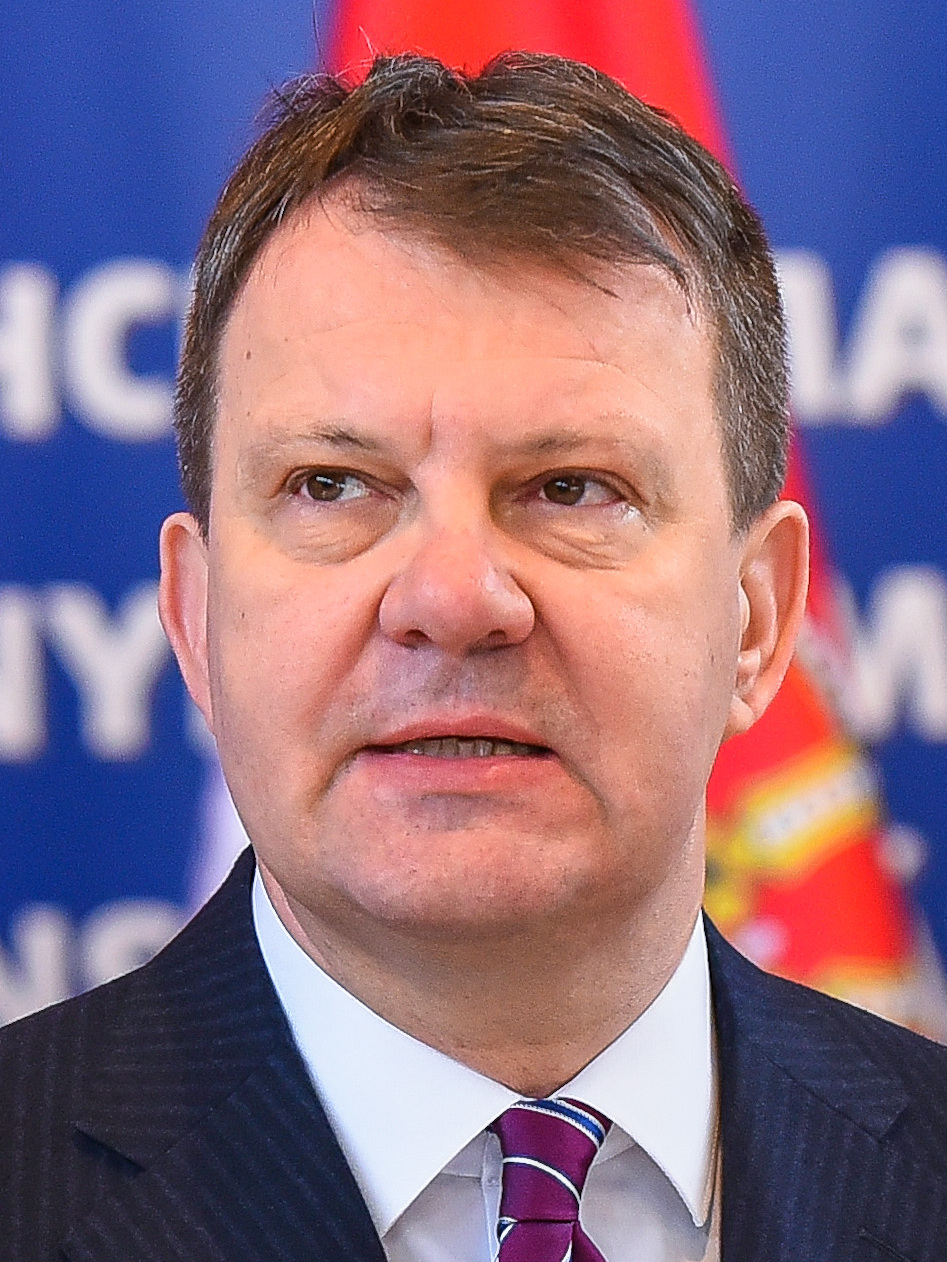
- Mirović in 2023

President of the Government of Vojvodina
- In office 20 June 2016 – 8 May 2024
- Preceded by: Bojan Pajtić
- Succeeded by: Maja Gojković

Minister of Regional Development and Local Self-Government
- In office 2 September 2013 – 27 April 2014
- Preceded by: Verica Kalanović
- Succeeded by: Kori Udovički

Personal details
- Born: 12 July 1968 (age 58) Kruševac, SR Serbia, SFR Yugoslavia
- Party: SRS (1991–2008); SNS (2008–present)
- Education: University of Novi Sad

Igor Mirović (Serbian Cyrillic: Игор Мировић; born 12 July 1968) is a Serbian politician, economist, and poet who served as the president of the Government of Vojvodina from 2016 to 2024. A member of the Serbian Progressive Party, he previously served as the minister of regional development and local self-government from 2013 and 2014.

== Works ==
- Nebo nad Vizantijom, 1994
- Kremen plamen, 2003

Political offices
Preceded by Verica Kalanović	Minister of Regional Development and Local Self-Government; 2013–2014	Succeeded by Kori Udovički
Preceded by Bojan Pajtić	President of the Government of Vojvodina; 2016–present	Incumbent
