= Žarko Obradović =

Serbian politician

- Жарко Обрадовић
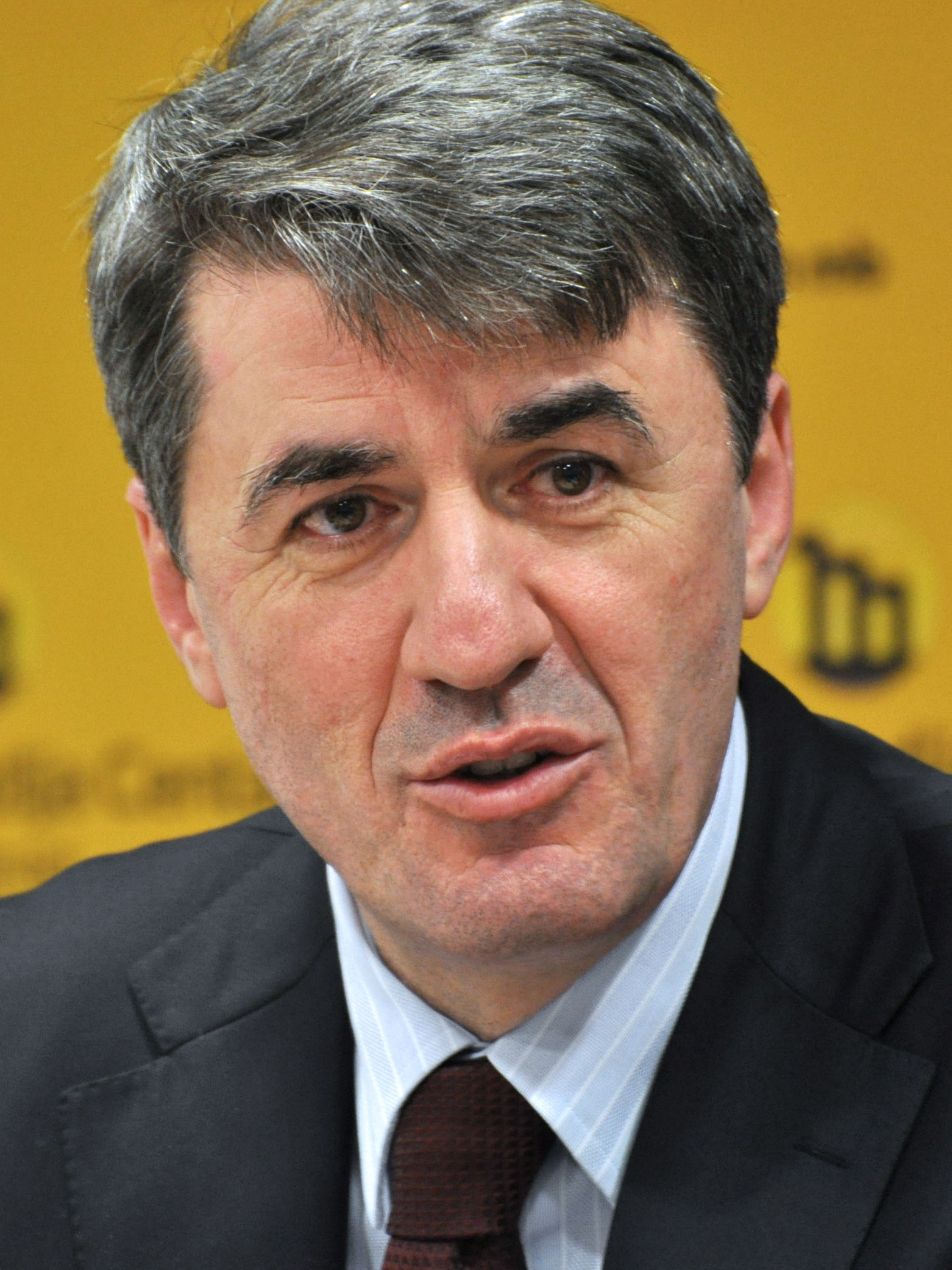
- Obradović in 2011

Minister of Education and Science
- In office 14 March 2011 – 2 September 2013
- Preceded by: Himself; Božidar Đelić (Science)
- Succeeded by: Tomislav Jovanović

Minister of Education
- In office 7 July 2008 – 14 March 2011
- Preceded by: Zoran Lončar
- Succeeded by: Himself

Personal details
- Born: 21 May 1960 (age 65) Ivangrad, PR Montenegro, FPR Yugoslavia
- Party: Socialist Party of Serbia
- Profession: Professor

Žarko Obradović (Note: Serbian Cyrillic: Жарко Обрадовић, pronounced [ʒǎːrko obrǎːdoʋitɕ]) (born 21 May 1960) is a Serbian politician who served as the minister of education from 2008 to 2013.

He holds a position of Lecturer at the Megatrend University and the Dean at the University's Faculty of Public Administration.

In May 2022, he was appointed Permanent Representative to International Organizations in Vienna.

== Biography ==
Born at Ivangrad (now Berane) in Montenegro, Obradović graduated from the Faculty of Political Sciences at the University of Belgrade, where he later also received his MA and PhD. He has published two books and ten papers.

From 1998 until 2000, he was Deputy Minister for Local Self-Government and in the Interim Government, while from October 2000 until January 2001 he held the position of Deputy Minister of Higher Education.

He has been MP since 2001. He was President and Deputy President of the Socialist Party of Serbia caucus in the Serbian parliament and has been Deputy President of the Socialist Party of Serbia from December 2006.

On 7 July 2008 he was appointed Minister of Education in the Cabinet of Mirko Cvetković, and held that position in the Cabinet of Ivica Dačić as well until Cabinet reshuffle in 2013.

Apart from his native Serbian, he speaks English fluently and has a working knowledge of French.

== Personal life ==
He is married, and has two daughters.

Government offices
Preceded by Zoran Lončar	Minister of Education of Serbia; 2008 – 2011	Succeeded by Himself
Preceded by Himself; Božidar Đelić (Minister of Science)	Minister of Education and Science of Serbia; 2011 – 2013	Succeeded by Tomislav Jovanović
