= Zoran Modrinić =

Serbian politician

Zoran Modrinić (Serbian Cyrillic: Зоран Модринић; born 1947) is a former politician from Serbia. He served as the republic's first minister of public administration and local self-government from 1997 to 1998. Modrinić was a member of the Yugoslav Left (Jugoslovenska Levica, JUL).

== Private career ==
Modrinić has a bachelor's degree in economics.

== Politician ==
=== Early years ===
Modrinić was president of the Voždovac municipal assembly from 1994 to 1996, at a time when the position was equivalent to mayor of the municipality. Online sources do not specify if he was a member of the JUL or the Socialist Party of Serbia (Socijalistička partija Srbije, SPS) during this period. He ran for the City Assembly of Belgrade in the 1996 local elections as a candidate of the SPS–JUL alliance in Voždovac's ninth division and was defeated by Milan Kostić from the opposition group Zajedno.

=== Cabinet minister ===
Zajedno won majority victories in Belgrade and several other major Serbian cities in the 1996 local elections, but the results were not initially recognized by the Serbian government, which was dominated by Slobodan Milošević's SPS. The government's refusal to accept the results prompted the 1996–1997 protests in Serbia, and following an extended standoff the Serbian parliament passed a lex specialis to recognize most of the victories claimed by Zajedno.

On the same day the lex specialis was passed, the Serbian parliament also established the ministry of public administration and local self-government. Modrinić was appointed as minister, serving in the cabinet of Mirko Marjanović. Some members of Zajedno expressed concern that Modrinić's ministry would undermine the authority of the civil administrations that they had just won. Modrinić rejected this, saying that his ministry would "cooperate with all councils, no matter who controls them." Vuk Drašković, the leader of the Serbian Renewal Movement (Srpski pokret obnove, SPO), one of the parties in Zajedno, criticized Modrinić on a personal level, referring to him as "the white magus" and "JUL's witchcraft cadre."

In May 1997, Modrinić co-chaired a meeting of the Serbian government and parliamentary parties on a bill for local self rule.

Modrinić appeared in the sixth position on a combined electoral list of the SPS, the JUL, and New Democracy for the Voždovac division in the 1997 Serbian parliamentary election. The list won four seats, and Modrinić was not awarded a mandate. (From 1992 to 2000, one-third of Serbia's parliamentary mandates were assigned to candidates from successful lists in numerical order, while the remaining two-thirds were distributed amongst other candidates at the discretion of the sponsoring parties and coalitions. Modrinić could have been awarded a mandate despite his relatively low position, but he was not.) He was removed from his ministerial position following a cabinet reshuffle on 24 March 1998.

Modrinić was at one time a member of the JUL's main board.

== Radio Television of Serbia ==
After his departure from cabinet, Modrinić was appointed as marketing director for Radio Television of Serbia (RTS). After the fall of the Milošević government in October 2000, it was reported that, as a regime loyalist, he had received an apartment and a loan of more than five hundred thousand dinars in dubious transactions from the corporation. In 2006, the Independent Journalists' Association of Serbia reported evidence that Modrinić had been responsible for the theft of significant funds from RTS, alleging that he received more than two million marks in two days by blackmailing advertisers during the 1998 FIFA World Cup. The journalists' association also contended that Modrinić's connections to JUL leader Mirjana Marković made him a more powerful figure within the RTS than general director Dragoljub Milanović. Modrinić has not returned to public life since 2000.
