= Rodoljub Šabić =

Serbian lawyer and government minister

- Родољуб Шабић
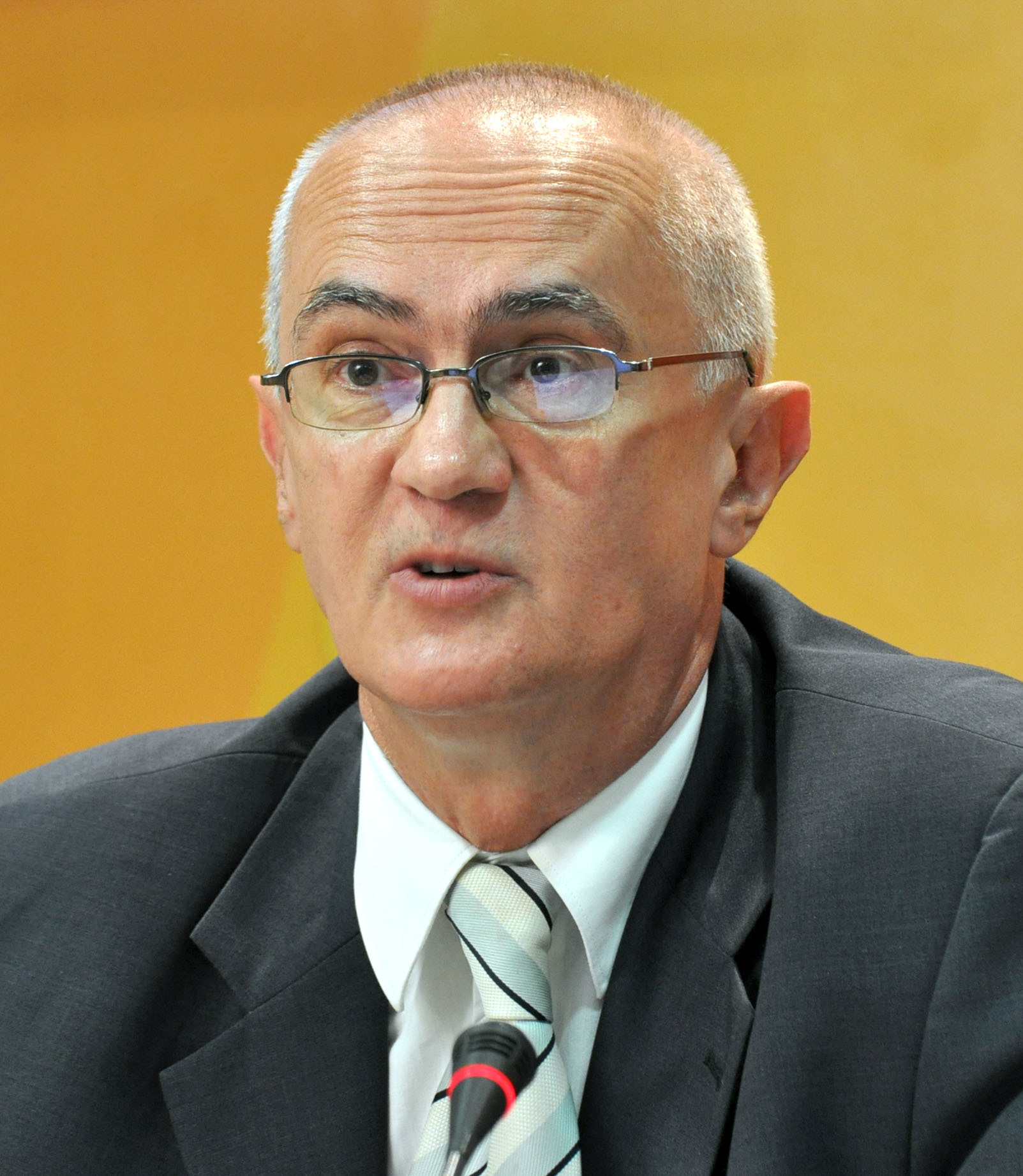

Minister of Public Administration and Local Self-Government
- In office 13 June 2002 – 16 October 2003
- Preceded by: Veljko Odalović
- Succeeded by: Zoran Lončar

Personal details
- Born: 15 October 1955 (age 70) Derventa, FPR Yugoslavia
- Party: Social Democracy (1997–2002); Social Democratic Party (2002–2004)
- Education: University of Belgrade
- Occupation: Lawyer

Rodoljub Šabić (Serbian Cyrillic: Родољуб Шабић, born 15 October 1955) is a Serbian lawyer, former Minister of Public Administration and Local Self-Government of Serbia, as well as the First Commissioner for Information of Public Importance of Serbia from 2004 to 2018.

== Biography ==
He was born in Derventa into a family of Yugoslav leftists, Mustafa and Stanka in 1955 while he spent his childhood in Sarajevo, Brčko and Tuzla, and at the age of twelve his family moved to Belgrade. Šabić identifies as a Serb and is non-religious. He graduated from the Faculty of Law, University of Belgrade. and worked as a lawyer. Together with 7 other lawyers, he founded CESID. He is married and has one child.

He has a sister, Jaca, an engineer, who has lived and worked in Canada since the 1990s.

== Political career ==
He became involved in politics in the 1980s, when he was a Vice Secretary of Legislation in Ante Marković's government. He was then one of the founders of the political party called Social Democracy, and then joined the Social Democratic Party, from which he resigned when he was elected Commissioner for Information of Public Importance in December 2004. He was a Member of the National Assembly and Vice-President of the National Assembly of the Republic of Serbia. From June 19, 2002, he was the Minister of Public Administration and Local Self-Government in the Government of the Republic of Serbia, under Zoran Đinđić and after his assassination under Zoran Živković. He was elected for the second seven-year term as the Commissioner for Information of Public Importance and Personal Data Protection in December 2011. In 2018, his term ended.

Preceded by Rodoljub Šabić	Minister of Public Administration and Local Self-Government; 2002 – 2003	Succeeded by Zoran Lončar
