= Lazar Slepčev =

Serbian political analyst

Lazar Slepčev (Serbian Cyrillic: Лазар Слепчев; born 1967) is a political analyst and former politician in Serbia. He served in the Assembly of Vojvodina from 1997 to 2000 as a member of the Serbian Renewal Movement (Srpski pokret obnove, SPO).

== Private career ==
Slepčev is a frequent commentator on political affairs in the Serbian media and has delivered several lectures on political history at the Cultural Centre of Novi Sad. In 2016, he was appointed to the management board of the city's student cultural centre.

== Politician ==
Slepčev was elected to the Vojvodina assembly for Novi Sad's tenth division in the 1996 provincial election as a candidate of the Zajedno (Together) alliance, a coalition of the SPO, the Democratic Party, and other parties. In 2000, he was a spokesperson for the SPO in Novi Sad during the buildup to the 2000 Serbian local elections. He was not re-elected to the provincial assembly in 2000. He appeared on the SPO's electoral list in the 2004 provincial election, the first in which half the seats were determined by proportional representation. The list did not cross the electoral threshold, and he was not returned.
