= Ana Brnabić =

Prime Minister of Serbia from 2017 to 2024

- Ана Брнабић
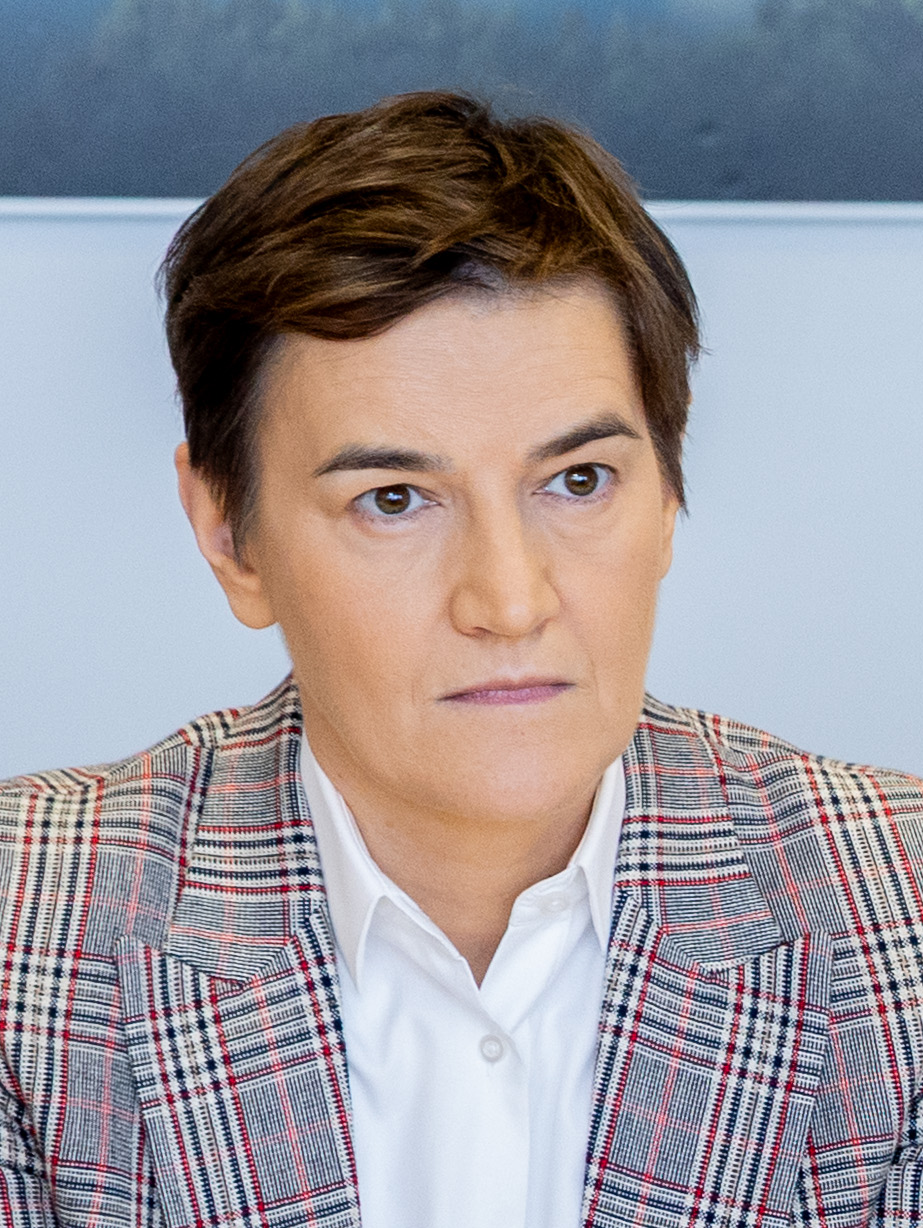
- Brnabić in 2026

President of Serbia
- Acting; 27 September 2026 – 17 November 2026
- Prime Minister: Đuro Macut
- Preceded by: Aleksandar Vučić
- Succeeded by: Aleksandar Čupić (acting)

President of the National Assembly of Serbia
- In office 20 March 2024 – 17 November 2026
- Preceded by: Vladimir Orlić
- Succeeded by: Aleksandar Čupić

Member of the National Assembly
- Incumbent
- Assumed office 6 February 2024
Additional ministries
Minister of Foreign Affairs
Acting
In office 22 October 2020 – 28 October 2020
| Preceded by | Ivica Dačić |
| Succeeded by | Nikola Selaković |
Minister of Finance
Acting
In office 16 May 2018 – 29 May 2018
| Preceded by | Dušan Vujović |
| Succeeded by | Siniša Mali |

Prime Minister of Serbia
- In office 29 June 2017 – 20 March 2024
- President: Aleksandar Vučić
- Deputy: Show list: Ivica Dačić (2017–2020; 2022–2024); Rasim Ljajić (2017–2020); Zorana Mihajlović (2017–2022); Nebojša Stefanović (2017–2022); Branko Ružić (2020–2022); Maja Gojković (2020–2024); Branislav Nedimović (2020–2022); Miloš Vučević (2022–2024); Siniša Mali (2022–2024)
- Preceded by: Aleksandar Vučić; Ivica Dačić (acting)
- Succeeded by: Ivica Dačić (acting); Miloš Vučević

Minister of Public Administration and Local Self-Government
- In office 11 August 2016 – 29 June 2017
- Prime Minister: Aleksandar Vučić; Ivica Dačić (acting)
- Preceded by: Kori Udovički
- Succeeded by: Branko Ružić

Personal details
- Born: 28 September 1975 (age 51) Belgrade, SR Serbia, SFR Yugoslavia
- Party: Independent (until 2019); SNS (since 2019)
- Domestic partner: Milica Đurđić
- Education: Northwood University (BBA); University of Hull (MBA)

Ana Brnabić (Note: Serbian: Ана Брнабић, pronounced [âna bř̩nabitɕ]) (born 28 September 1975) is a Serbian politician who has been a member of the National Assembly since 2024. A member of the Serbian Progressive Party (SNS), she served as Prime Minister of Serbia from 2017 to 2024, as president of the National Assembly from 2024 to 2026 and, after Aleksandar Vučić's resignation, as acting president of Serbia from 27 September to 17 November 2026. She was the first woman and the first openly gay person to serve as prime minister of Serbia, and is the longest-serving holder of that office.

Brnabić entered government in August 2016 as minister of public administration and local self-government under prime minister Aleksandar Vučić. After Vučić became president of Serbia in May 2017, he proposed her as his successor, and she and her cabinet were voted into office on 29 June 2017. Elected as a non-partisan politician, she joined the SNS in 2019 and became one of its vice-presidents in 2021. The National Assembly re-elected her as prime minister after the 2020 and 2022 elections. After the 2023 election, she was elected president of the National Assembly, and in that capacity she acted as head of state after Vučić resigned in September 2026 to run for prime minister in the 2026 parliamentary election.

In 2019, Forbes ranked Brnabić as the 88th most powerful woman in the world and the 19th most powerful female political and policy leader. Critics and some political scientists argued that, as prime minister, she held little power of her own as chief of the executive, and that Vučić exercised executive power from the presidency.

== Early life and education ==
Brnabić was born in Belgrade. Her father Zoran was born in Užice in 1950 and finished his studies in Belgrade, where the family lived. Her paternal grandfather, Anton Brnabić, an ethnic Croat and Yugoslav military officer, was born in Stara Baška on the Croatian island of Krk, in the Kingdom of Yugoslavia (present-day Croatia). He fought with the Yugoslav Partisans during World War II and was ranked lieutenant colonel after the war. Her maternal grandparents were from Babušnica, southeastern Serbia. Brnabić identifies as a Serb.

Brnabić was raised in Belgrade, where she attended the Belgrade Fifth Gymnasium. She holds a Bachelor of Business Administration (BBA) degree from Northwood University in Midland, Michigan, and a Master of Business Administration (MBA) from the University of Hull in England.

== Business career ==
Brnabić worked for more than a decade with international organisations, foreign investors, local governments and the public sector in Serbia.

Before joining the Government of Serbia, she was director of Continental Wind Serbia, where she worked on a €300 million investment in the Čibuk wind farm near Kovin. She was a member of the managing board of the non-profit Peksim Foundation.

She worked for several US consulting companies that implemented USAID-funded projects in Serbia, as deputy manager of the Serbia Competitiveness Project, an expert on the Local Self-Government Reform Program and senior coordinator of the Municipal Economic Development Program. She took part in founding the National Alliance for Local Economic Development (NALED) in 2006, and worked on introducing the concept of local economic development in Serbia and on building municipalities' capacity to improve the local business environment and attract investment. She later became a member, and then president, of NALED's managing board.

== Political career ==
=== Minister of Public Administration and Local Self-Government (2016–2017) ===
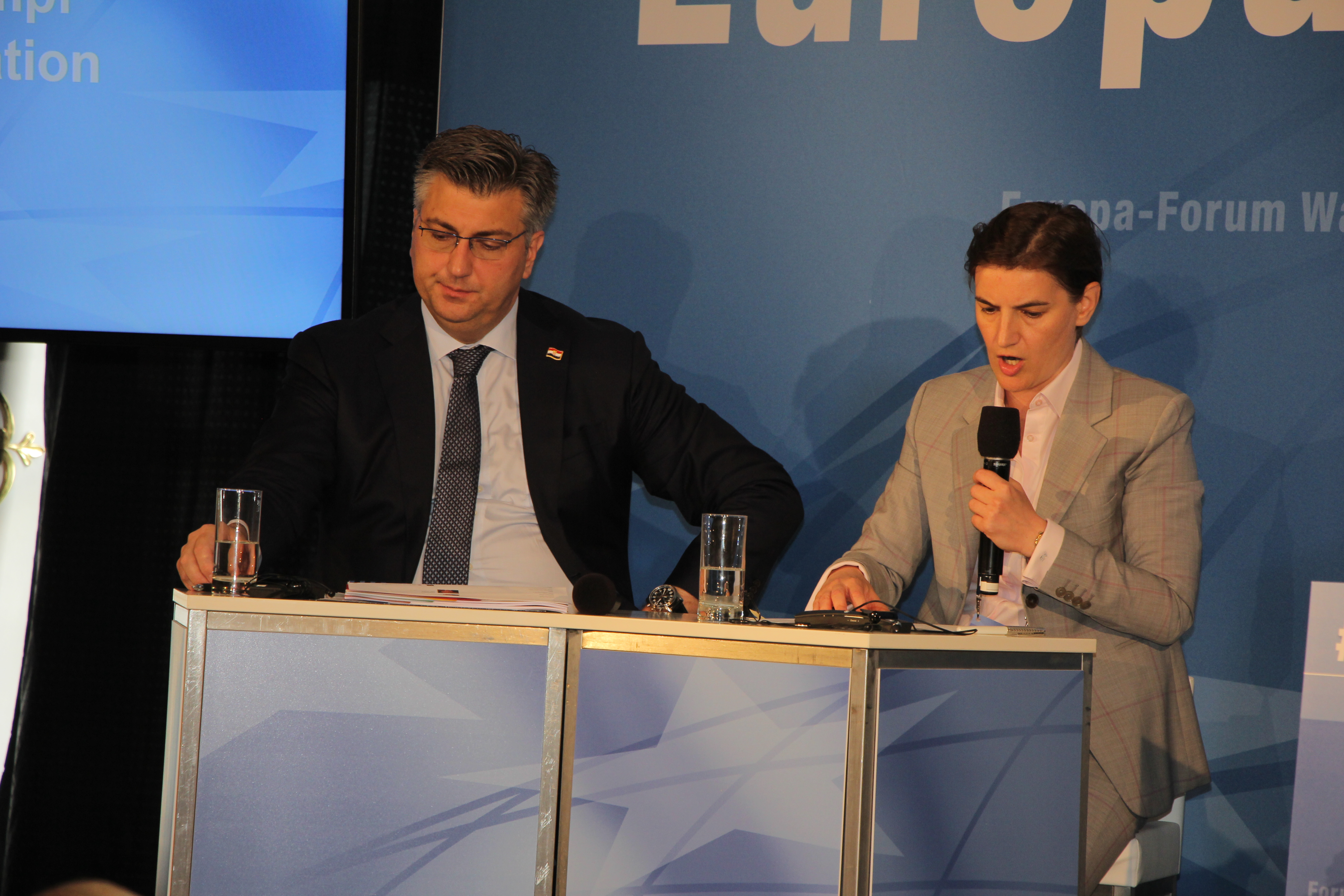
Brnabić alongside Croatian Prime Minister Andrej Plenković, 16 June 2018

On 11 August 2016, Brnabić was appointed Minister of Public Administration and Local Self-Government in the second cabinet of Aleksandar Vučić. She also chaired the government's Council for Innovative Entrepreneurship and Information Technologies and the Republic Council for National Minorities, and was vice-president of the Republic Council for Public Administration Reform. In this role, she initiated reforms of central government services.

=== Prime Minister (2017–2024) ===
After Vučić was inaugurated as president of Serbia on 31 May 2017, he proposed Brnabić as prime minister on 15 June. She and her cabinet were voted into office on 29 June 2017 by 157 of the 250 members of the National Assembly, making her Serbia's first female and first openly gay prime minister.

Brnabić described herself as a pro-European and technocratic prime minister. She said that the priorities of her government were modernisation, education reform and digitalisation. She was also criticised for heading a conservative and nationalist government that included openly anti-Western and pro-Russian ministers.

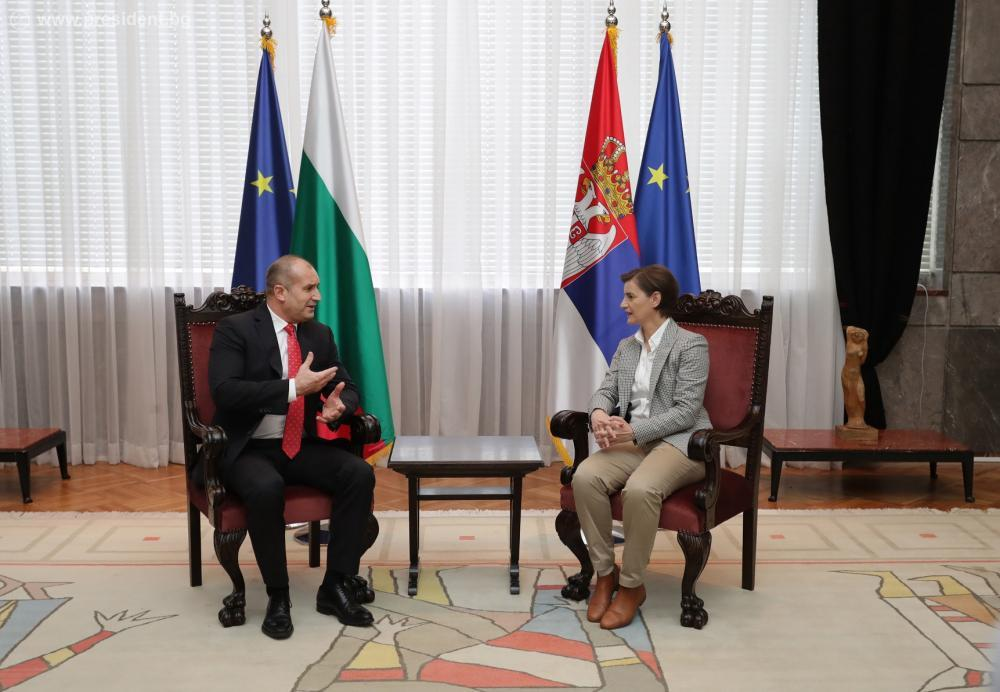
Brnabić with Bulgarian President Rumen Radev during his official state visit in Belgrade, 21 June 2018

In May 2018, following the resignation of Dušan Vujović, Brnabić took over the Ministry of Finance in an acting capacity until a new minister was appointed. On 29 May 2018, the National Assembly elected Siniša Mali as Vujović's successor. On 26 July 2018, Brnabić hosted a ceremony at the United States Congress in Washington to mark the 100th anniversary of the raising of the Serbian flag at the White House.

In October 2019, Brnabić confirmed that she had joined the ruling Serbian Progressive Party. On 25 October 2019, Brnabić signed a Free Trade Agreement between Serbia and the member states of the Eurasian Economic Union (EAEU), extending the list of Serbian products that can be exported to the EAEU territory.

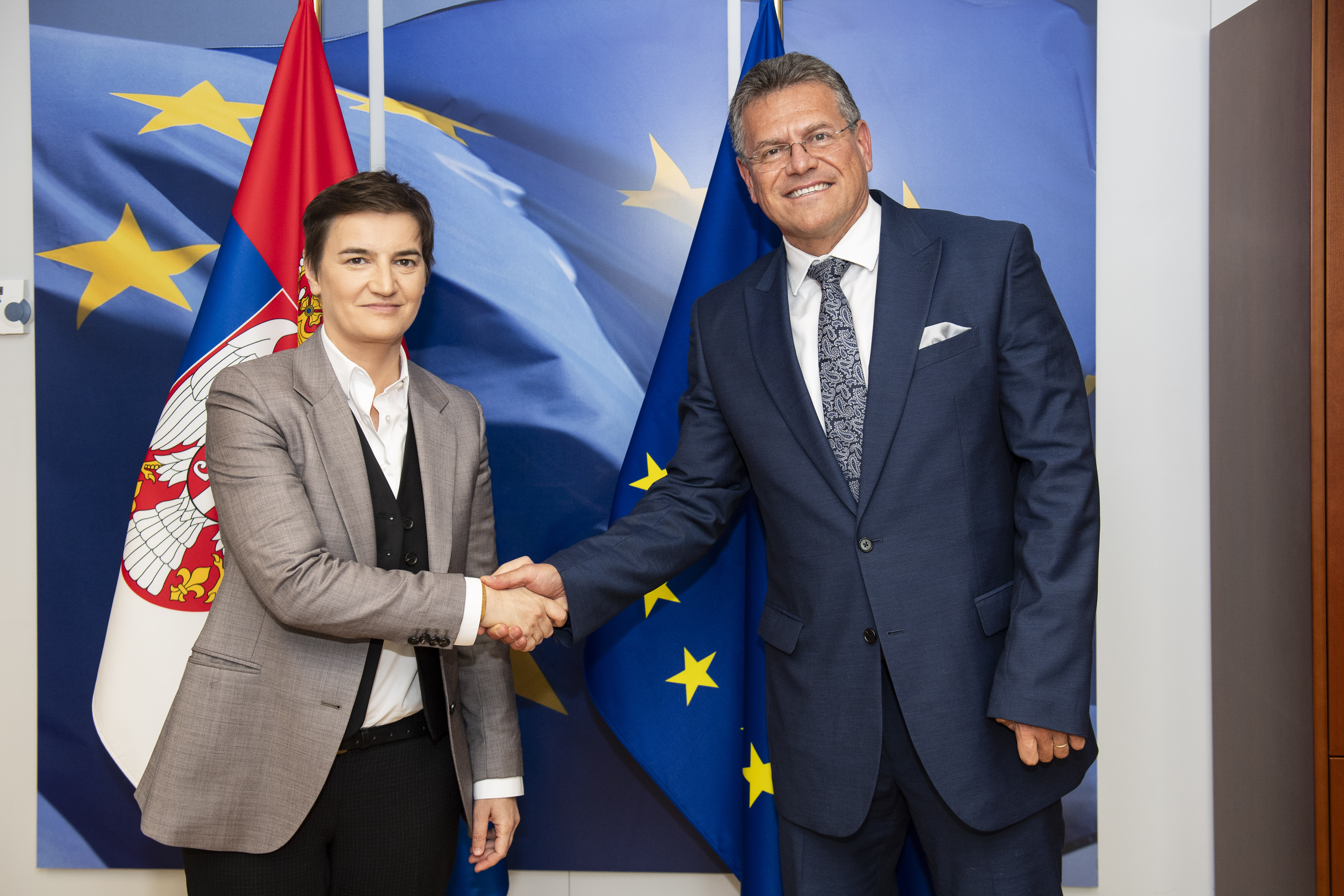
Brnabić with Vice-President of the European Commission Maroš Šefčovič in Brussels, on 4 July 2023

After the COVID-19 pandemic spread to Serbia in March 2020, Brnabić was appointed head of the Health Crisis Committee. After President Vučić declared a state of emergency on 15 March, the government adopted emergency measures to contain the outbreak. A curfew was introduced for the first time in Serbia since World War II.

Following the 2020 election, she briefly served as acting minister of foreign affairs in October 2020, before her second cabinet took office on 28 October 2020. Brnabić was elected a vice-president of the SNS in November 2021. After the 2022 election, her third cabinet was elected on 26 October 2022.

==== Debate on her constitutional role ====
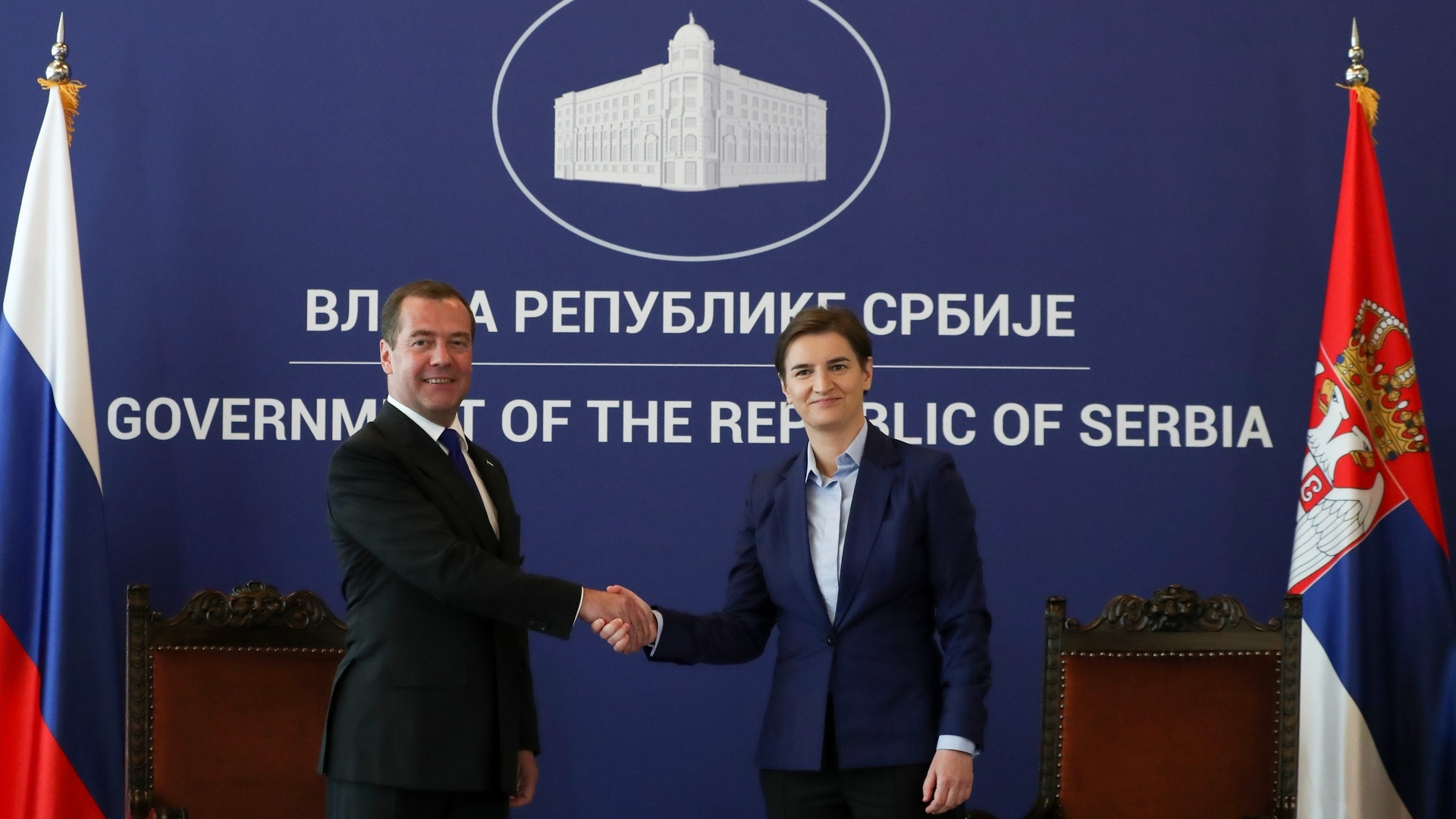
Brnabić with Russian Prime Minister Dmitry Medvedev during his visit to Serbia, 19 October 2019

Political scientist Krzysztof Zuba cited Brnabić as an example of a head of government heavily dependent on the leader of the governing party. He described a situation in which the prime minister lacks an independent political position as chief of the executive as a "surrogate government", arguing that a distribution of power contrary to the constitution is characteristic of non-democratic systems.

In February 2019, Freedom House reported that Serbia's status declined from Free to Partly Free due to deterioration in the conduct of elections, continued attempts by the government and allied media outlets to undermine independent journalists through legal harassment and smear campaigns, and Vučić's accumulation of executive powers that conflict with his constitutional role. Opposition leaders and some observers described her as a puppet of Vučić, whose office was, under the Constitution, largely ceremonial with no significant executive power. Before taking office, Brnabić said that Vučić should have the role of a "mentor" to the prime minister.

=== President of the National Assembly (2024–2026) ===
Brnabić was elected president of the National Assembly on 20 March 2024. As first deputy prime minister, Ivica Dačić became acting prime minister until a new government was elected.

=== Acting President of Serbia (2026) ===
After Vučić resigned as president on 27 September 2026 to lead the SNS list in the parliamentary election, Brnabić took over the duties of president of the Republic the following day, as the Constitution provides that the president of the National Assembly replaces the president for up to three months. On 8 November, she convened the constitutive session of the newly elected National Assembly for 17 November. Her tenure as president of the National Assembly, and with it as acting president of the Republic, ended on 17 November 2026, when the mandates of the deputies of the 15th National Assembly were confirmed; the next president of the Assembly was to take over as acting head of state.

Brnabić was third on the "Aleksandar Vučić – United Serbia" list in the 2026 election, which won 103 of the 250 seats and went into opposition.

== Political positions ==
=== Kosovo ===
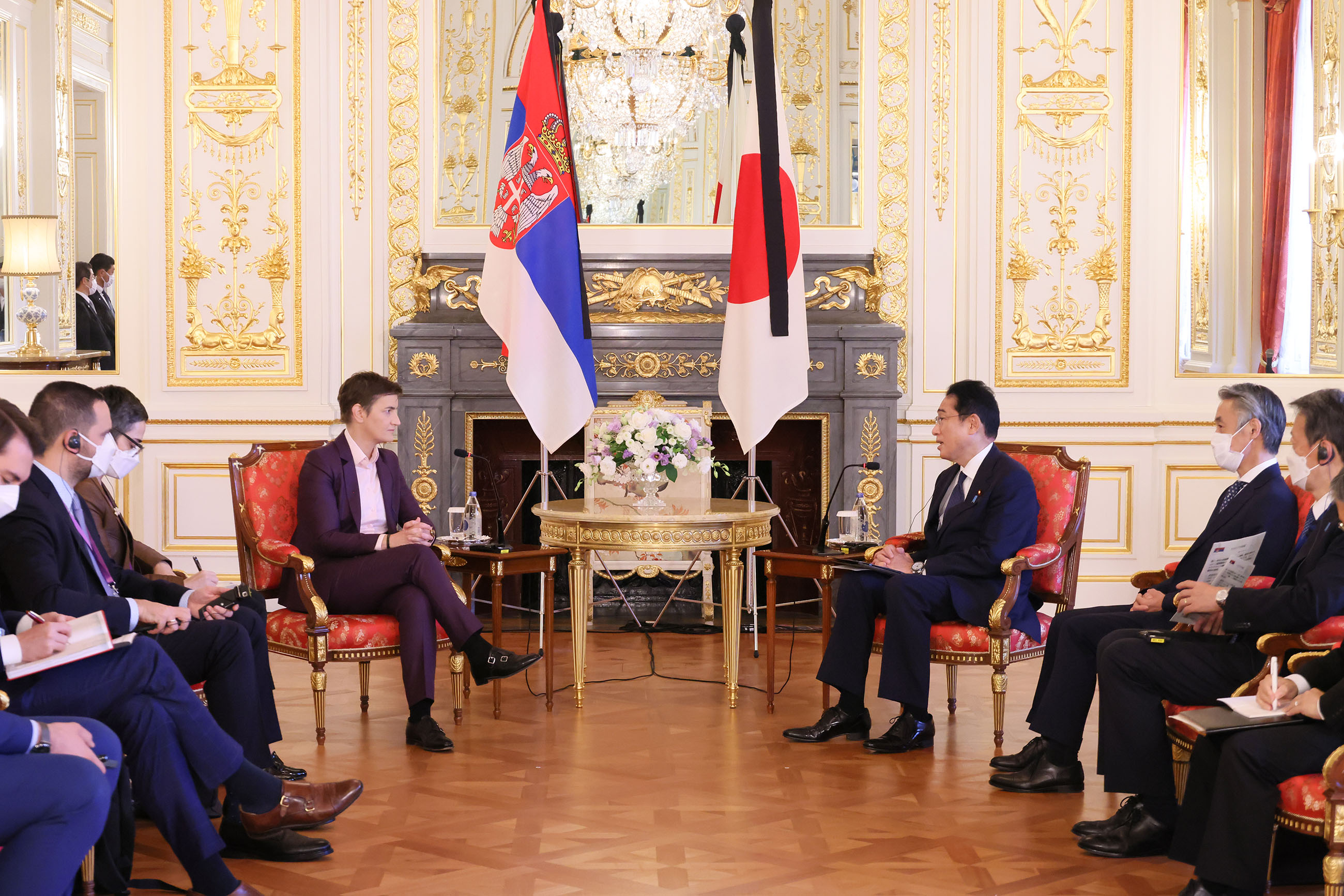
Brnabić with Japanese Prime Minister Fumio Kishida, 28 September 2022

In December 2018, commenting on the announced transformation of the Kosovo Security Force into the Kosovo Armed Forces, Brnabić said: "I hope we won't have to use our military, but at the moment, that's one of the options on the table because one cannot witness a new ethnic cleansing of the Serbs and new Storms — although Edi Rama is calling for them. When someone knows you have a strong army, then they have to sit down and talk to you."

In May 2019, during the presentation of the European Commission's 2019 progress report, Brnabić said: "Haradinaj, Thaçi and Veseli are competing to see who the biggest nationalist and chauvinist is. What scares me most is that we are dealing with irrational people, the worst kind of populist, people who literally walked out of the woods." In response, Kosovo's Foreign Minister, Behgjet Pacolli, called her remarks racist and said he would ban her from entering Kosovo. The remarks were also widely criticised by Albanian social media users, who mocked her with the hashtag #literallyjustemergedfromthewoods.

On 20 January 2020, during her premiership, the governments of Serbia and Kosovo agreed to restore flights between their capitals for the first time in more than two decades. The deal came after months of diplomatic talks by Richard Grenell, the United States ambassador to Germany, who was named special envoy for Serbian-Kosovar relations by President Donald Trump the year before.

=== Srebrenica genocide denial ===
In an interview on 14 November 2018 with the German public broadcaster Deutsche Welle, Brnabić denied that the July 1995 massacres of Bosniaks by Bosnian Serb forces in Srebrenica had been an act of genocide. Two weeks later, the European Parliament adopted a resolution saying that the parliament regretted the continuing denial of the Srebrenica genocide by parts of the Serbian authorities and recalled that full cooperation with the ICTY and its successor mechanism included accepting its judgements. The president and the chief prosecutor of the International Residual Mechanism for Criminal Tribunals in The Hague criticised Brnabić's denial of the genocide.

=== LGBT rights ===
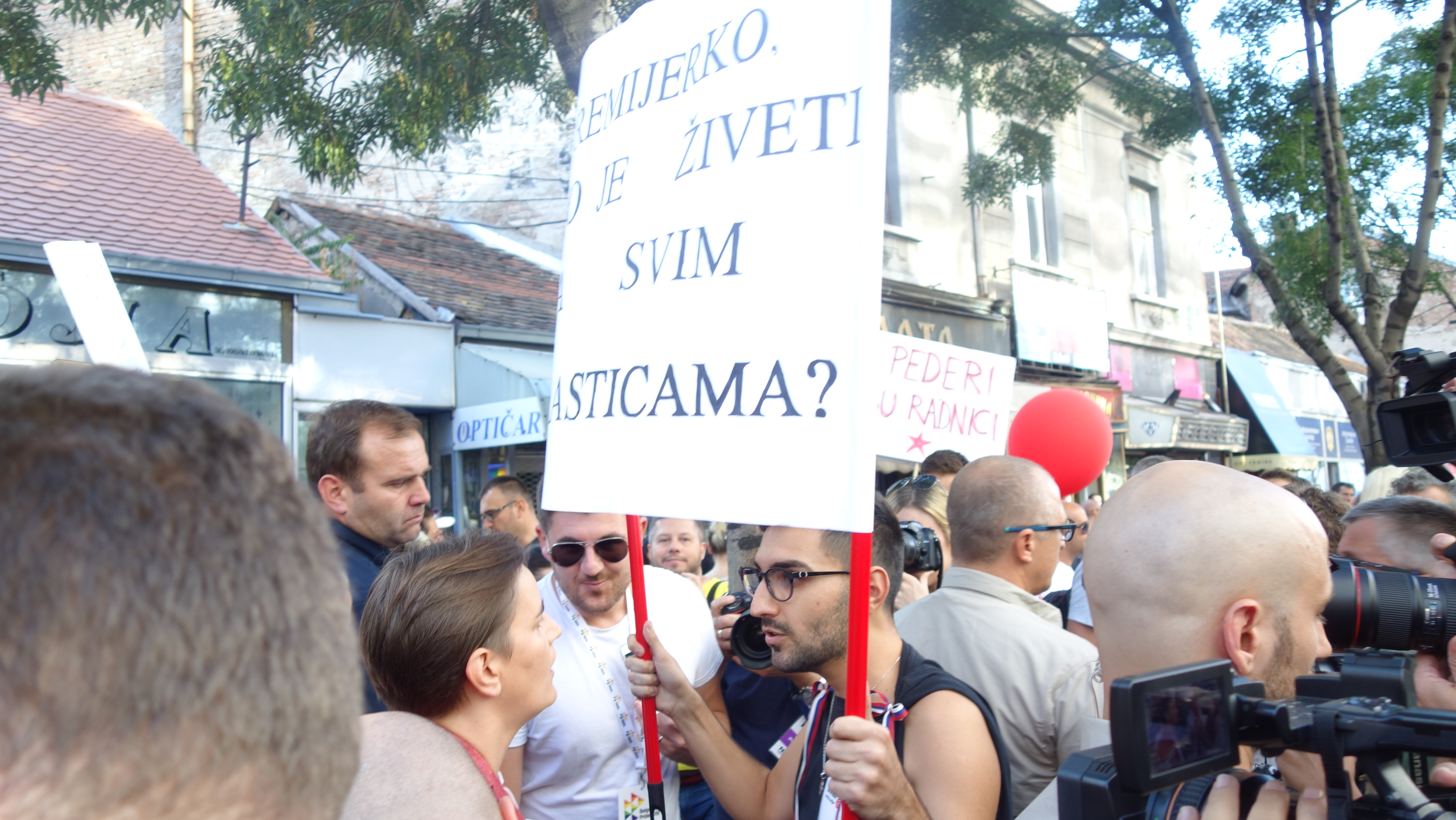
Brnabić confronted at the 2019 Belgrade Pride parade by a participant holding a sign that says: "Prime Minister, what is it like to live with all the privileges?"

After she was appointed prime minister, Brnabić said that she did not want to be branded Serbia's gay prime minister and that she did not plan "to push LGBT legal reforms at this stage" because she wanted to prioritise other policy reforms. In September 2017, Brnabić took part in the Belgrade Pride parade, becoming the first Serbian prime minister, and the first head of government from the Balkans, to attend a pride march. At the event, she said: "The government is here for all citizens and will secure the respect of rights for all citizens."

Brnabić said that she supported inheritance rights for same-sex couples. Some journalists and LGBT advocates argued that she did little to advance LGBT equality in Serbia.

== Personal life ==
Brnabić is a lesbian, the second female LGBTQ head of government following Jóhanna Sigurðardóttir (Iceland 2009–2013), and fifth openly LGBTQ head of government overall following Jóhanna, Elio Di Rupo (Belgium 2011–2014), Xavier Bettel (Luxembourg 2013–2023), and Leo Varadkar (Ireland 2017–2020, 2022–2024).

In February 2019, her partner Milica Đurđić gave birth to a son, (Note: Same-sex marriage is constitutionally banned in Serbia, and same-sex couples are not permitted to adopt.) making Brnabić the first openly gay head of government whose partner gave birth while she was in office.

== Honours ==
She has received several awards for development projects she worked on and for promoting socially responsible business and tolerance. She has been awarded the Order of the Republika Srpska. She was named an honorary citizen of Šabac in 2024.

== See also ==
- List of openly LGBTQ state leaders

== Notes ==
Political offices
| Preceded by Kori Udovički | Minister of Public Administration and Local Self-Government; 2016–2017 | Succeeded by Branko Ružić |
| Preceded by Ivica Dačić (Acting) | Prime Minister of Serbia; 2017–2024 | Succeeded by Miloš Vučević |
| Preceded by Dušan Vujović | Minister of Finance (Acting); 2018 | Succeeded by Siniša Mali |
| Preceded by Ivica Dačić | Minister of Foreign Affairs (Acting); 2020 | Succeeded by Nikola Selaković |
| Preceded by Vladimir Orlić | President of the National Assembly of Serbia; 2024–2026 | Succeeded by Aleksandar Čupić |
| Preceded by Aleksandar Vučić | President of Serbia (Acting); 2026 | Succeeded by Aleksandar Čupić as acting president |
