= Nikola Selaković =

Serbian lawyer and politician

- Никола Селаковић
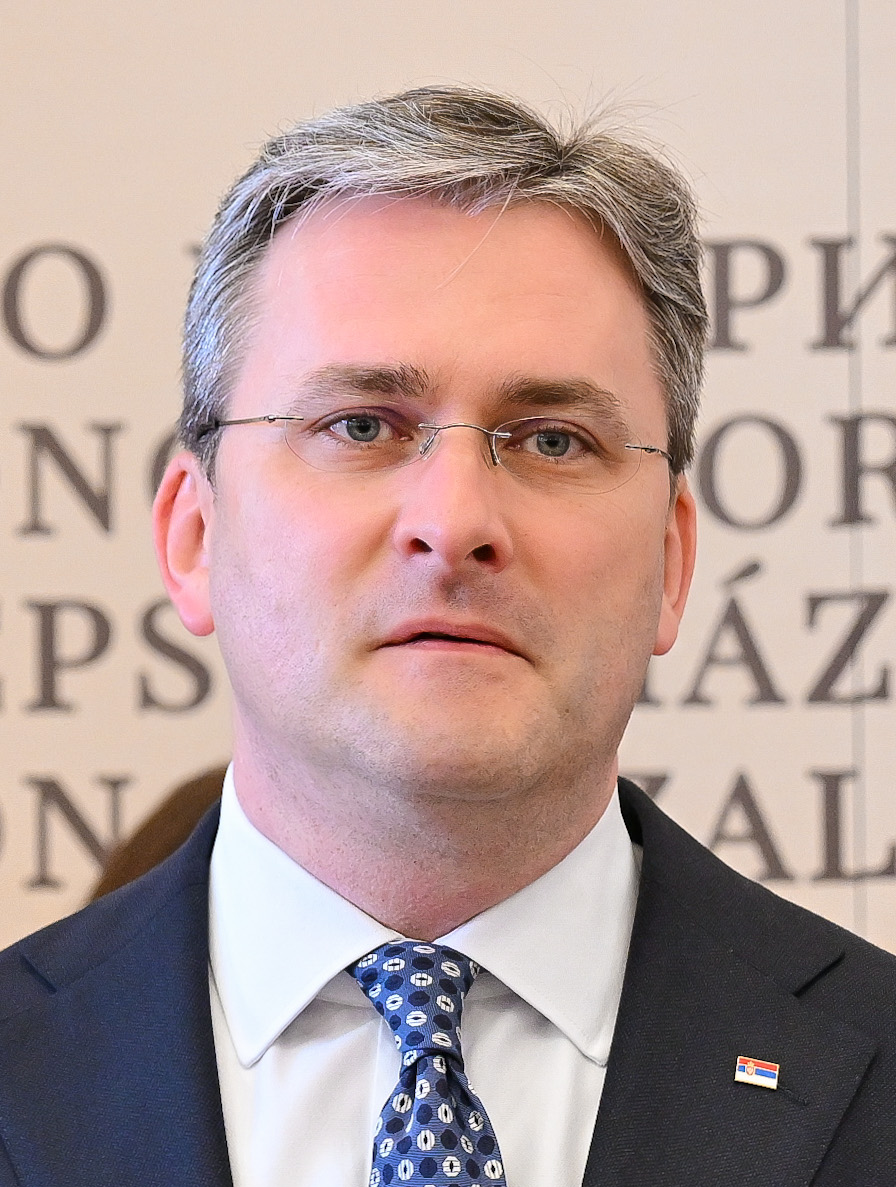
- Selaković in 2026

Minister of Culture
- Incumbent
- Assumed office 2 May 2024
- Prime Minister: Miloš Vučević; Đuro Macut
- Preceded by: Maja Gojković

Minister of Labour, Employment, Veteran and Social Policy
- In office 26 October 2022 – 2 May 2024
- Prime Minister: Ana Brnabić; Ivica Dačić (acting)
- Preceded by: Darija Kisić Tepavčević
- Succeeded by: Nemanja Starović

Minister of Foreign Affairs
- In office 28 October 2020 – 26 October 2022
- Prime Minister: Ana Brnabić
- Preceded by: Ana Brnabić (acting); Ivica Dačić
- Succeeded by: Ivica Dačić

Minister of Justice
- In office 27 April 2014 – 11 August 2016
- Prime Minister: Aleksandar Vučić
- Preceded by: Himself
- Succeeded by: Nela Kuburović

Minister of Justice and Public Administration
- In office 27 July 2012 – 27 April 2014
- Prime Minister: Ivica Dačić
- Preceded by: Snežana Malović; Milan Marković (Note: Marković served as minister of public administration.)
- Succeeded by: Himself; Kori Udovički (Note: Udovički served as minister of public administration.)

Personal details
- Born: 30 April 1983 (age 43) Titovo Užice, SR Serbia, SFR Yugoslavia
- Party: SRS (2001–2008); SNS (2008–present)
- Children: 3
- Education: University of Belgrade Faculty of Law
- Occupation: Politician
- Profession: Lawyer

Nikola Selaković (Note: Serbian Cyrillic: Никола Селаковић, pronounced [nǐkola sêlaːkoʋitɕ]) (born 30 April 1983) is a Serbian politician serving as minister of culture since 2024. A member of the Serbian Progressive Party (SNS), he previously served as minister of justice (Note: The ministry was known as ministry of justice and public information until 2014.) from 2012 to 2016, minister of foreign affairs from 2020 to 2022 and as minister of labour, employment, veteran and social policy from 2022 to 2024.

== Early life and education ==
He was born in 1983 in Titovo Užice. Graduated from Belgrade's Sixth Gymnasium and the University of Belgrade Faculty of Law, where he is currently a research assistant in comparative legal tradition.

While he was an assistant at the Faculty of Law, Selaković took a bottle of water from a Croatian manufacturer from the student at the lecture and threw it in the garbage can, saying that he was doing it because it was not domestic water. Selaković said that he only wanted to point out to the students the necessity of buying domestic products.

During his studies, he won the oratory competition at the Faculty of Law three times. He was a member of the team at the international competition in the field of international public law "Philip C. Jessup International Law Moot Court Competition", and in 2007 he received the first prize of the Alan Watson Foundation for the project "Dušan's Code and Legal Transcripts".

Selaković is the founder, and in the period from 2011 to 2012, he was also the president of the Serbian Cultural Circle "Despot Stefan Lazarević". Since 2010, he has been the president of the "Oratoria" Institute - Center for Rhetoric. He has been a member since 2003, and since 2005 he has been the secretary of the Club of Lovers of Ancient and Roman Law at the Faculty of Law "Forum Romanum".

== Political career ==
According to some sources, Selaković joined the Serbian Radical Party in 2001 out of revolt against the ruling DOS coalition after his father, a member of the Socialist Party of Serbia was fired from his job, because he was a member of that party.

He has been a member of the Serbian Progressive Party since 2008, a member of the party's executive board and president of the party's Legal Council.

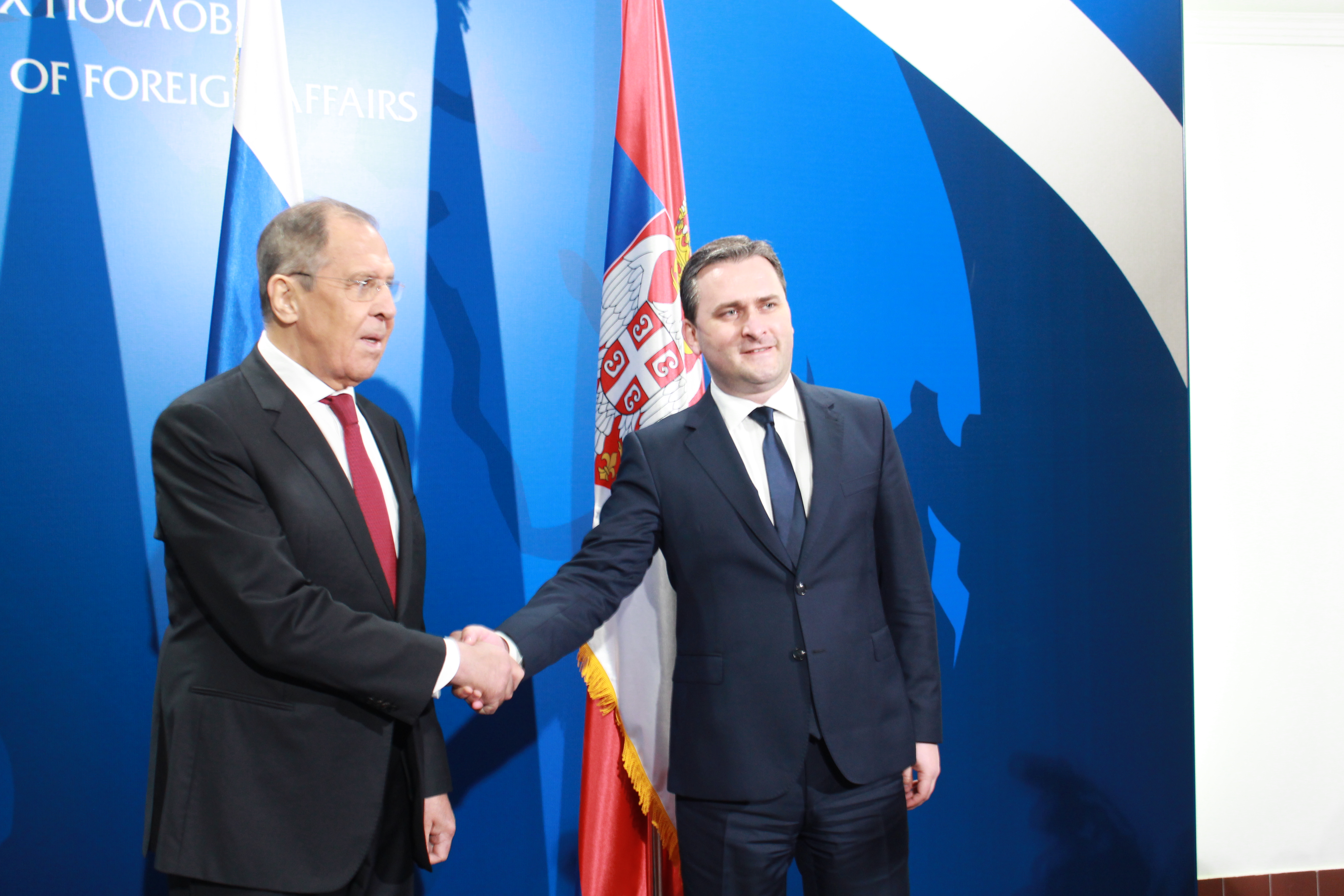
Selaković (right) with Sergey Lavrov, Minister for Foreign Affairs of Russia, 15 December 2020

He served as Minister of Justice and State Administration in the Government of Serbia and the cabinet of Ivica Dačić in the period from 2012 to 2014, and then as Minister of Justice in the period from 2014 to 2016 in the first cabinet of Aleksandar Vučić.

While he was the Minister of Justice, together with the then Minister of Defense Bratislav Gašić, Selaković organized the transfer of Vladimir Lazarević, a convicted war criminal by plane from The Hague and the ceremonial reception of the retired general who was released after serving two thirds of his sentence. He was Serbia's first Minister of Justice who visited Serbian detainees awaiting final ICTY verdicts. Selaković visited Ratko Mladić, Radovan Karadžić, Dragoljub Ojdanić, Zdravko Tolimir, Vinko Pandurević, Vlastimir Đorđević, Nikola Šainović, Sreten Lukić, Nebojša Pavković, Vladimir Lazarević and Momčilo Perišić.

By the decision of President of Serbia Aleksandar Vučić of 31 May 2017, he was appointed to the position of Secretary General of the President of the Republic, which he held until 27 October 2020.

Since 28 October 2020, he has been serving as the Minister of Foreign Affairs in the second cabinet of Ana Brnabić.

On 13 November 2020, Selaković warned that Serbs are still discriminated against in Croatia.

In 2025, the Serbian prosecutor for organized crime charged Selaković with abuse of office and falsifying of documents to subject the General Staff Building in Belgrade to a redevelopment project linked to American businessman Jared Kushner.

== Personal life ==
He has a brother Velimir Selaković. He is married to Milica and is the father of three children.
