= National Alliance for Local Economic Development =

- Национална алијанса за локални економски развој Nacionalna alijansa za lokalni ekonomski razvoj
- Abbreviation: NALED
- Formation: 2006
- Headquarters: Belgrade
- Executive director: Violeta Jovanović
- Website: naled.rs/en/

The National Alliance for Local Economic Development (Serbian Cyrillic: Национална алијанса за локални економски развој, romanized: Nacionalna alijansa za lokalni ekonomski razvoj), commonly referred to by the abbreviation NALED, is the largest public-private association in Serbia, whose membership gathers over 300 companies, local self-governments and non-governmental organizations that work together to create better conditions for life and work in Serbia.

== History ==
NALED was founded in June 2006 as part of the USAID Municipal Economic Development Project (MEGA) as part of the vision of project director and local economic development and public administration reform expert Steven Rosenberg to launch an innovative platform for public-private dialogue in Serbia. The patrons and signatories of the Founding Declaration were the President of Serbia and the United States Ambassador to Serbia.

Since it was founded in 2006, NALED has become one of the leading authorities in the field of monitoring the regulatory activity and measuring the public administration performance. In cooperation with the state institutions and with the support of international organizations, NALED has realized more than 40 projects for economic development: Business Friendly Certification, Regulatory Index of Serbia (RIS), Grey Book, campaign Ask WHEN, By-Law Barometer, Calculator of local business expenses and many others. NALED key partners involve the Delegation of the European Union to Serbia, Open Society Foundations, GIZ and USAID. NALED's mission is to improve the business environment in Serbia through institutional reforms with active participation and cooperation of businesses, local governments and the citizens. NALED's main goals are the following: - Improving the regulatory framework for doing business - Municipal capacity building for economic development - Promotion of dialogue between private and public sector

== Goals ==
=== Improvement of public policies and services ===
- Improved quality and process of making regulations
- Reduced shadow economy
- Improved public finances
- Improved conditions for the development of eGovernment and eBusiness
- Improved conditions for entrepreneurship and innovation
- Improved conditions for investment and construction
- Improved conditions for the development of agriculture and the food industry
- Improved health services and availability of medicines
- Supported the implementation of the green agenda

=== Encouraging territorial development and EU integration ===
- Improved conditions for local economic development
- Improved and harmonized business conditions in the Western Balkans region
- Improved process of EU integration in areas of importance for the economy
