= Aleksandar Jevtić (politician) =

Serbian politician

Aleksandar Jevtić (Serbian Cyrillic: Александар Јевтић) is a former politician in Serbia. He was a member of the Assembly of Vojvodina from 2000 to 2004.

== Private career ==
Jevtić is a graduated engineer with a focus in construction.

== Politician ==
Jevtić was elected to the Vojvodina assembly in the 2000 provincial election, winning Novi Sad's thirteenth division. At the time of the election, he was a member of Social Democracy, one of the constituent parties of the Democratic Opposition of Serbia (DOS), a broad and ideologically diverse coalition of parties opposed to the rule of Slobodan Milošević. The DOS won a landslide victory in the election, and Jevtić served with the assembly majority. He was the leader of the Social Democracy board for Novi Sad during this time.

In May 2001, Jevtić was one of fifteen prominent members of Social Democracy who called for party leader Vuk Obradović to resign, following accusations that Obradović had sexually harassed an aide. This controversy resulted in a split in the party. Jevtić was not a candidate for re-election to the provincial assembly in 2004.
