= Ministry of State Administration and Local Self-Government (Serbia) =

Government ministry of Serbia

- Министарство државне управе и локалне самоуправе Ministarstvo državne uprave i lokalne samouprave

Ministry overview
- Formed: 11 February 1997; 29 years ago
- Jurisdiction: Government of Serbia
- Headquarters: Birčaninova Street 6, Belgrade
- Minister responsible: Snežana Paunović
- Website: mduls.gov.rs

The Ministry of State Administration and Local Self-Government (Serbian: Министарство државне управе и локалне самоуправе, romanized: Ministarstvo državne uprave i lokalne samouprave) is a ministry in the Government of Serbia which is in the charge of state administration and local self-government. The current minister is Snežana Paunović, who has been in office since 16 April 2025.

== History ==
The Ministry of Public Administration and Local Self-Government was established on 11 February 1997.

In 2011, the Ministry of Public Administration and Local Self-Government was added the Ministry of Human and Minority Rights, and it was named the Ministry of Human and Minority Rights, State ublic Administration, and Local Self-Government until 2012. From 2012 to 2014, the state administration portfolio was within the Ministry of Justice and Public Administration under Nikola Selaković while the local self-government portfolio became part of the Ministry of Regional Development and Local Self-Government under Verica Kalanović from 2012 to 2013. The regional development portfolio was split from the Ministry of Economy. From 2013 to 2014 Igor Mirović led the Ministry of Regional Development and Local Self-Government. In 2014, Kori Udovički took the reunified Ministry of State Administration and Local Self-Government from Selaković and Mirović, respectively.

== Organization ==
The ministry is organized into following departments:

- Department for state administration
- Department for local self-government
- Department for civil registries
- Department for international cooperation and European integration
- Department for professional training
- Department for human resources management

== List of ministers ==
Political Party: JUL SRS SPS SD DOS DSS DS G17 Plus URS SNS n-p

No.	Portrait	Minister	Took office	Left office	Time in office	Party	Cabinet
Minister of Public Administration and Local Self-Government
1	Zoran Modrinić	Zoran Modrinić (born 1947)	11 February 1997	24 March 1998	1 year, 41 days	JUL	Marjanović I
2	Gordana Pop Lazić	Gordana Pop Lazić (born 1956)	24 March 1998	24 October 2000	2 years, 214 days	SRS	Marjanović II
3	Veljko Odalović	Veljko Odalović (born 1956)	24 October 2000	25 January 2001	93 days	SPS	Minić
4	Rodoljub Šabić	Rodoljub Šabić (born 1955)	13 June 2002	16 October 2003	1 year, 125 days	SD	Đinđić–Živković
–	Ivica Eždenci	Ivica Eždenci (born 1969); Acting	16 October 2003	3 March 2004	139 days	DOS	Đinđić–Živković
5	Zoran Lončar	Zoran Lončar (born 1965)	3 March 2004	15 May 2007	3 years, 73 days	DSS	Koštunica I
6	Milan Marković	Milan Marković (born 1970)	15 May 2007	14 March 2011	3 years, 303 days	DS	Koštunica II; Cvetković
Minister of Human and Minority Rights, Public Administration, and Local Self-Government
(6)	Milan Marković	Milan Marković (born 1970)	14 March 2011	27 July 2012	1 year, 135 days	DS	Cvetković
Minister of Regional Development and Local Self-Government
7	Verica Kalanović	Verica Kalanović (born 1954)	27 July 2012	2 September 2013	1 year, 37 days	G17+ URS	Dačić
8	Igor Mirović	Igor Mirović (born 1968)	2 September 2013	27 April 2014	237 days	SNS	Dačić
Minister of State Administration and Local Self-Government
9	Kori Udovički	Kori Udovički (born 1961)	27 April 2014	11 August 2016	2 years, 106 days	Independent	Vučić I
10	Ana Brnabić	Ana Brnabić (born 1975)	11 August 2016	29 June 2017	322 days	Independent	Vučić II
11	Branko Ružić	Branko Ružić (born 1975)	29 June 2017	28 October 2020	3 years, 121 days	SPS	Brnabić I
12	Marija Obradović	Marija Obradović (born 1974)	28 October 2020	26 October 2022	1 year, 363 days	SNS	Brnabić II
13	Aleksandar Martinović	Aleksandar Martinović (born 1976)	26 October 2022	2 May 2024	1 year, 189 days	SNS	Brnabić III
14	Jelena Žarić Kovačević	Jelena Žarić Kovačević (born 1981)	2 May 2024	16 April 2025	349 days	SNS	Vučević
15	Snežana Paunović	Snežana Paunović (born 1975)	16 April 2025	Incumbent	1 year, 115 days	SPS	Macut
