= Verica Kalanović =

Serbian politician (born 1954)

- Верица Калановић
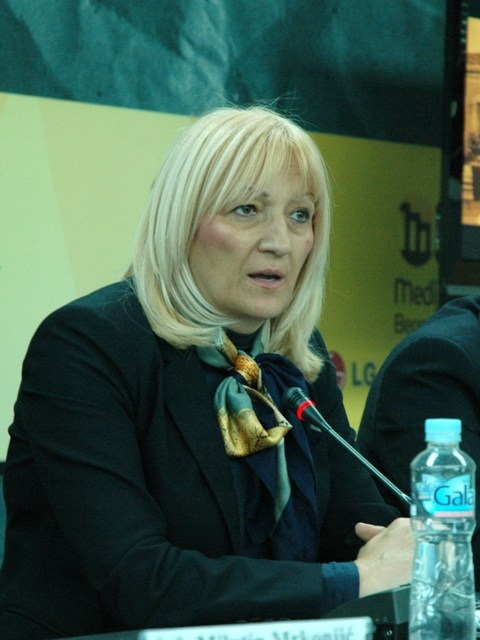
- Kalanović in 2008

Minister of Regional Development and Local Self-Government
- In office 27 July 2012 – 2 September 2013
- Prime Minister: Ivica Dačić
- Preceded by: Nebojša Ćirić (Regional Development); Milan Marković (Local Self-Government)
- Succeeded by: Igor Mirović

Deputy Prime Minister of Serbia
- In office 14 March 2011 – 27 July 2012
- Prime Minister: Mirko Cvetković
- Preceded by: Mlađan Dinkić
- Succeeded by: Rasim Ljajić

Minister of National Investment Plan
- In office 7 July 2008 – 21 February 2011
- Prime Minister: Mirko Cvetković
- Preceded by: Dragan Đilas
- Succeeded by: Snežana Samardžić-Marković (Acting)

Personal details
- Born: 19 July 1954 (age 72) Trstenik, PR Serbia, FPR Yugoslavia
- Party: G17 Plus
- Education: University of Belgrade
- Occupation: Politician

Verica Kalanović (Note: Serbian Cyrillic: Верица Калановић, pronounced [ʋêrit͡sa kalǎːnoʋit͡ɕ]) (born 19 July 1954) is a Serbian politician. She served as the Minister of Regional Development and Local Self-Government from 2012 to 2013, and as the Minister of National Investment Plan from 2008 to 2012. She also served as the Deputy Prime Minister of Serbia from 2011 to 2012.

== Education and career ==
Kalanović was born in Trstenik, SR Serbia, Yugoslavia and graduated in 1977 from the Faculty of Technology and Metallurgy in Belgrade, where she also received a master's degree in 1980. From 1980 to 1993, she worked in Prva Petoletka in Trstenik. From 1993 to 2003, she was professor at the post-secondary technical school in Trstenik. From 2000 to 2001, she was member of the Trstenik municipality executive council.

From 2003 to 2006, she was head of G17 Plus caucus in the parliament of Serbia and Montenegro. She was president of the Serbia-Montenegrin Parliament's Committee for interior economic relations and finances, a member of the parliamentary delegation in the Council of Europe and a member of the committee for local and regional development in the Council of Europe.

She was State Secretary in the Ministry of Economy and Regional Development from 2007 to July 2008.

On 7 July 2008 she was elected Minister for National Investment Plan, and resigned to the post following announcement of Cabinet re-shuffle which took place on 2 September 2013.

== Personal life ==
Kalanović is married and have two children.

Government offices
Preceded by Nebojša Ćirić (Regional Development); Milan Marković (Local Self-Government)	Minister of Regional Development and Local Self-Government; 2012–2013	Succeeded by Igor Mirović
Preceded by Mlađan Dinkić	Deputy Prime Minister of Serbia; 2011–2012	Succeeded by Rasim Ljajić
Preceded by Dragan Đilas	Minister of National Investment Plan; 2008–2011	Succeeded by Snežana Samardžić-Marković (Acting)
