= Milan Marković =

Serbian lawyer and politician (born 1970)

- Милан Марковић
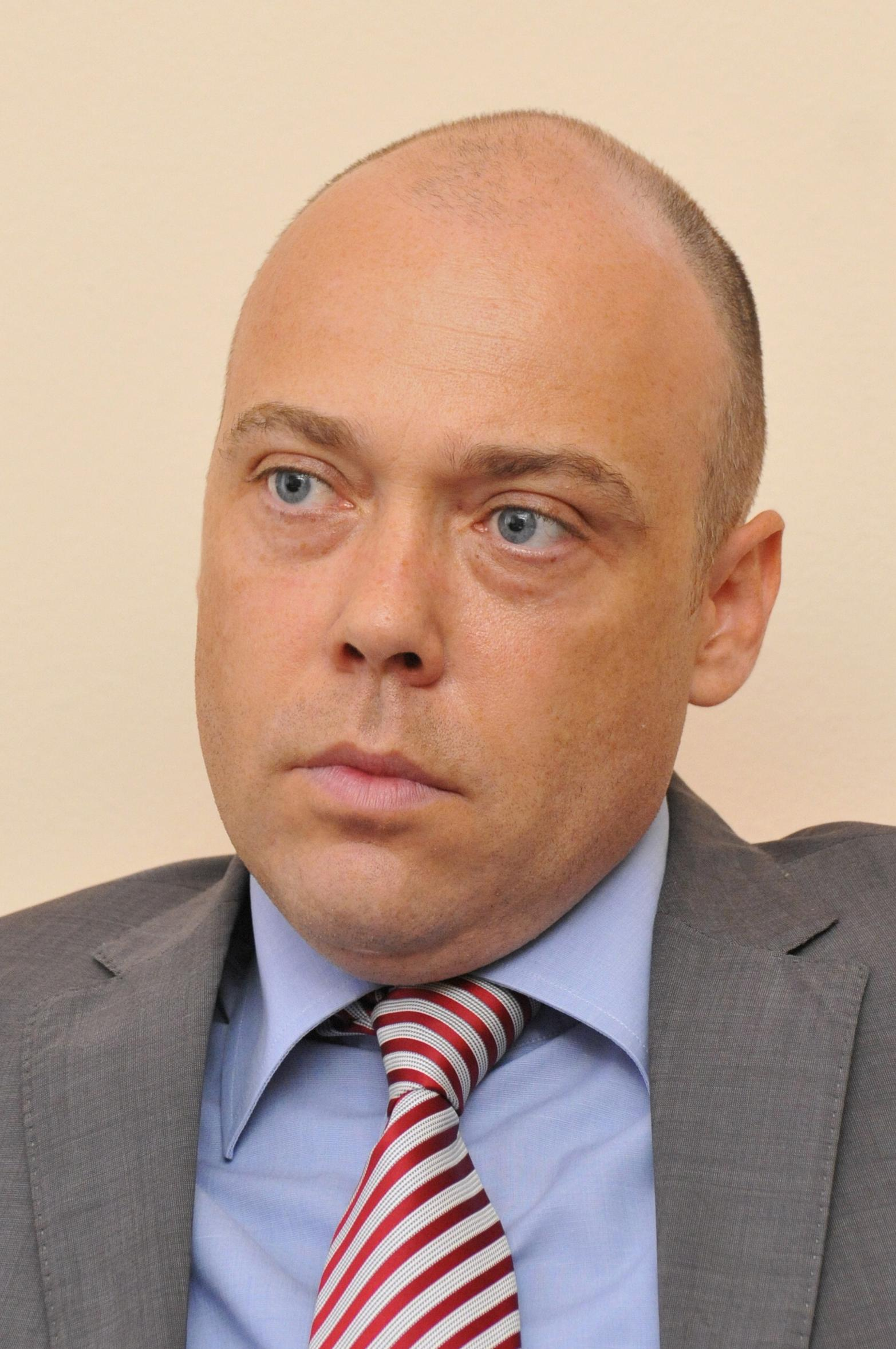

Minister of Public Administration and Local Self-Government
- In office 15 May 2007 – 14 March 2011
- Preceded by: Zoran Lončar
- Succeeded by: Milan Marković

Minister of Human and Minority Rights, Public Administration and Local Self-Government
- In office 14 March 2011 – 27 July 2012
- Preceded by: Milan Marković; Svetozar Čiplić (Human and Minority Rights)
- Succeeded by: Nikola Selaković (Public Administration); Verica Kalanović (Local Self-Government)

Personal details
- Born: 7 September 1970 (age 56) Belgrade, SFR Yugoslavia
- Party: Independent (2012–present); Democratic Party (until 2012)
- Education: University of Belgrade
- Occupation: Politician
- Profession: Lawyer

Milan Marković (Serbian Cyrillic: Милан Марковић, born 7 September 1970) is a Serbian lawyer, professor and politician. He served as the Minister of Public Administration and Local Self-Government from 2007 to 2011 and as the Minister of Human and Minority Rights, Public Administration and Local Self-Government from 2011 to 2012.

He was president of the Palilula municipality from 2000 to 2004. He has been an MP in Serbian Parliament since 2001. From 2003 to 2007 he was deputy speaker in Serbian parliament. He was member of managing boards in PKB and Prva Petoletka companies. He was the Belgrade mayor deputy from 2000 until 2004.

He teaches at the University of Belgrade Faculty of Security Studies and is a graduate of the University of Belgrade's Law School.

He left the Democratic Party in 2012.

Government offices
Preceded by Zoran Lončar	Minister of Public Administration and Local Self-Government; 2007–2011	Succeeded by Milan Marković
Preceded by Milan Marković; Svetozar Čiplić (Human and Minority Rights)	Minister of Human and Minority Rights, Public Administration and Local Self-Government; 2011–2012	Succeeded by Nikola Selaković (Public Administration); Verica Kalanović (Local Self-Government)
