= Ministry of Labour, Employment, Veteran and Social Policy (Serbia) =

Government ministry of Serbia

- Министарство рада, запошљавања, борачке и социјалне политике Ministarstvo rada, zapošljavanja, boračke i socijalne politike

Ministry overview
- Formed: 11 February 1991; 35 years ago
- Jurisdiction: Government of Serbia
- Headquarters: Nemanjina Street 22–26, Belgrade
- Minister responsible: Milica Đurđević Stamenkovski
- Website: minrzs.gov.rs

The Ministry of Labour, Employment, Veteran and Social Policy (Serbian: Министарство рада, запошљавања, борачке и социјалне политике, romanized: Ministarstvo rada, zapošljavanja, boračke i socijalne politike) is a ministry in the Government of Serbia. The current minister is Milica Đurđević Stamenkovski, in office since 16 April 2025.

The Ministry was established on 11 February 1991. From 2001 to 2004, the Ministry was split in two separate ministries, one in charge of labour and employment portfolio and the other in charge of social policy portfolio.

== Organization ==
The ministry is organized into following departments:

- Department for labor and employment
- Department for retirement pension and disability insurance
- Department for disabled veterans' protection
- Department for social protection
- Department for persons with disabilities protection
- Department for financial and analytical affairs
- Department for international cooperation, European integration, and projects
- Department for development and planning affairs

== List of ministers ==
Political Party: SPS DS SDP SDP / SDPS PUPS PS SNS SSZ n-p

Name	Party	Term of office		Prime Minister (Cabinet)
Minister of Labour, Veteran and Social Policy
Branka Ješić (born 1937)	SPS	11 February 1991	24 September 1992	Zelenović (I); Božović (I)
Jovan Radić (born 1949)	SPS	24 September 1992	14 July 1993	Božović (I); Šainović (I)
Nikola Ristivojević	SPS	14 July 1993	18 March 1994	Šainović (I)
Jovan Radić (born 1949)	SPS	18 March 1994	28 May 1996	Marjanović (I)
Milivoje Stamatović (1935–2010)	SPS	28 May 1996	24 March 1998	Marjanović (I)
Tomislav Milenković (born 1950)	SPS	24 March 1998	24 October 2000	Marjanović (II)
Gordana Matković (born 1960)	DS	24 October 2000	25 January 2001	Minić (transitional)
Minister of Labour and Employment
Dragan Milovanović (born 1955)	DS	25 January 2001	3 March 2004	Đinđić (I); Živković (I)
Minister of Labour, Employment, and Social Policy
Slobodan Lalović (1954–2023)	SDP	3 March 2004	15 May 2007	Koštunica (I)
Minister of Labour and Social Policy
Rasim Ljajić (born 1964)	SDP	15 May 2007	27 July 2012	Koštunica (II); Cvetković (I)
Rasim Ljajić (born 1964)	SDPS	15 May 2007	27 July 2012	Koštunica (II); Cvetković (I)
Jovan Krkobabić (1930–2014)	PUPS	27 July 2012	22 April 2014 (Died in office)	Dačić (I)
Zoran Martinović (born 1963); Acting Minister	SDPS	22 April 2014	27 April 2014	Dačić (I)
Minister of Labour, Employment, Veteran and Social Policy
Aleksandar Vulin (born 1972)	PS	27 April 2014	29 June 2017	Vučić (I • II)
Zoran Đorđević (born 1970)	SNS	29 June 2017	28 October 2020	Brnabić (I)
Darija Kisić Tepavčević (born 1975)	n-p	28 October 2020	26 October 2022	Brnabić (II)
Nikola Selaković (born 1983)	SNS	26 October 2022	2 May 2024	Brnabić (III)
Nemanja Starović (born 1982)	SNS	2 May 2024	16 April 2025	Vučević (I)
Milica Đurđević Stamenkovski (born 1990)	SSZ	16 April 2025	Incumbent	Macut (I)
