= Ministry of Mining and Energy (Serbia) =

Government ministry of Serbia

- Министарство рударства и енергетике Ministarstvo rudarstva i energetike

Ministry overview
- Formed: 11 February 1991; 35 years ago
- Jurisdiction: Government of Serbia
- Headquarters: Kralja Milana Street 36, Belgrade
- Minister responsible: Dubravka Đedović
- Website: mre.gov.rs

The Ministry of Mining and Energy (Serbian: Министарство рударства и енергетике, romanized: Ministarstvo rudarstva i energetike) is a ministry in the Government of Serbia which is in the charge of mining and energy. The current minister is Dubravka Đedović, in office since 26 October 2022.

== History ==
The Ministry of Mining and Energy was established in 1991. The Ministry was abolished in 2011, when it was merged into ministries of Infrastructure (Energy department) and Environment (Mining department). In 2012, it was reestablished as Energy department was split from the Ministry of Infrastructure, and Environment department of reorganized former Ministry for Environmental Protection was split. In 2014, the ministry in its original form with departments of mining and energy was re-established.

== List of ministers ==
Political Party: SPS DOS DS DSS SNS

Name	Party	Term of Office		Prime Minister (Cabinet)
Minister of Mining and Energy
Nikola Šainović (born 1948)	SPS	11 February 1991	10 February 1993	Zelenović (I); Božović (I)
Vladimir Živanović	SPS	10 February 1993	18 March 1994	Šainović (I)
Dragan Kostić (born 1947)	SPS	18 March 1994	11 February 1997	Marjanović (I)
Srboljub Stanković (born 1940)	SPS	11 February 1997	24 March 1998	Marjanović (I)
Života Ćosić (1942–2025)	SPS	24 March 1998	11 November 1999	Marjanović (II)
Slobodan Tomović (born 1946)	SPS	11 November 1999	24 October 2000	Marjanović (II)
Srboljub Antić (born 1955)	DOS	24 October 2000	25 January 2001	Minić (transitional)
Goran Novaković (born 1959)	DS	25 January 2001	19 June 2002	Đinđić (I)
Kori Udovički (born 1961)	DOS	19 June 2002	22 July 2003	Đinđić (I); Živković (I)
Slobodan Ružić (born 1960); Acting Minister	DOS	22 July 2003	2 October 2003	Živković (I)
Nikola Nikolić; Acting Minister	DOS	2 October 2003	3 March 2004	Živković (I)
Radomir Naumov (1946–2015)	DSS	3 March 2004	15 May 2007	Koštunica (I)
Aleksandar Popović (born 1971)	DSS	15 May 2007	7 July 2008	Koštunica (II)
Petar Škundrić (born 1947)	SPS	7 July 2008	14 March 2011	Cvetković (I)
Merged into ministries of Infrastructure and Environment
Minister of Energy, Development, and Environment
Zorana Mihajlović (born 1970)	SNS	27 July 2012	27 April 2014	Dačić (I)
Minister of Energy and Mining
Aleksandar Antić (born 1969)	SPS	27 April 2014	28 October 2020	Vučić (I • II); Brnabić (I)
Zorana Mihajlović (born 1970)	SNS	28 October 2020	26 October 2022	Brnabić (II)
Dubravka Đedović (born 1978)	Independent	26 October 2022	Incumbent	Brnabić (III); Vučević (I); Macut (I)
