= Ministry of Culture and Information (Serbia) =

Government ministry of Serbia

Ministry of Culture
- Министарство културе Ministarstvo kulture

Ministry overview
- Formed: 11 February 1991; 35 years ago
- Jurisdiction: Government of Serbia
- Headquarters: Vlajkovićeva 3, Belgrade
- Minister responsible: Nikola Selaković
- Website: kultura.gov.rs

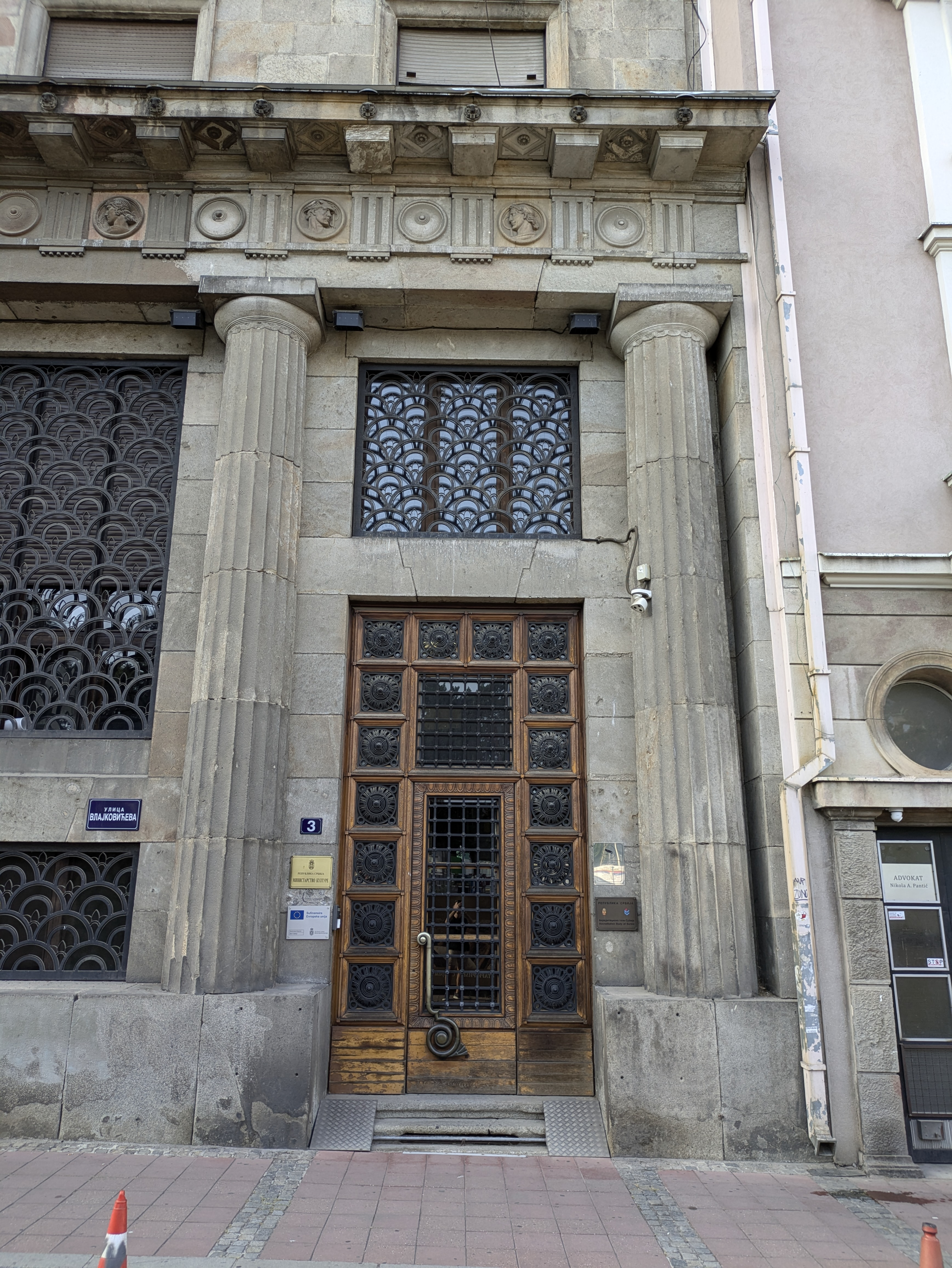
Entrance to the Ministry

The Ministry of Culture (Serbian: Министарство културе, romanized: Ministarstvo kulture) is a ministry in the Government of Serbia, which is in the charge of culture and mass media regulation. The current minister is Nikola Selaković, in office since 2 May 2024.

== History ==
The Ministry of Culture was established in 1991. The Ministry of Information was merged into the Ministry of Culture in 2001. The Ministry of Telecommunications and Information Society was merged into the Ministry of Culture, Information, and Informational Society in 2011. The Ministry of Religion and Diaspora which existed from 1991 to 2012, merged into the Ministry of Culture, Information, and Diaspora in 2012. Also, some of the jurisdictions of the Ministry were passed to the reestablished Ministry of Internal and Foreign Trade, Telecommunications, and Information Society in 2012. Ministry was once again re-established as the Ministry of Culture in 2022.

== Organization ==
The ministry is organized into following departments:

- Department for the protection of cultural heritage and digitalization
- Department for contemporary creativity
- Department for international cooperation and European integration

== List of ministers ==
Political Party: SPS SPO DS G17 Plus SNS n-p

Name	Party	Term of Office		Prime Minister (Cabinet)
Minister of Culture
Radomir Šaranović (1937–2001)	SPS	11 February 1991	23 December 1991	Zelenović (I)
Miodrag Đukić (1938–2010)	SPS	23 December 1991	10 February 1993	Božović (I)
Đoko Stojičić (1936–2021)	SPS	10 February 1993	18 March 1994	Šainović (I)
Nada Popović-Perišić (born 1946)	SPS	18 March 1994	20 August 1998	Marjanović (I • II)
Željko Simić (born 1958)	SPS	20 August 1998	24 October 2000	Marjanović (II)
Milan Komnenić (1940–2015)	SPO	24 October 2000	25 January 2001	Minić (transitional)
Branislav Lečić (born 1955)	DS	25 January 2001	23 May 2002	Đinđić (I)
Minister of Culture and Public Information
Branislav Lečić (born 1955)	DS	23 May 2002	2 April 2003	Đinđić (I); Živković (I)
Minister of Culture and Media
Branislav Lečić (born 1955)	DS	2 April 2003	3 March 2004	Živković (I)
Minister of Culture
Dragan Kojadinović (born 1954)	SPO	3 March 2004	15 May 2007	Koštunica (I)
Vojislav Brajović (born 1949)	DS	15 May 2007	7 July 2008	Koštunica (II)
Nebojša Bradić (born 1956)	G17 Plus	7 July 2008	14 March 2011	Cvetković (I)
Minister of Culture, Information, and Informational Society
Predrag Marković (born 1955)	G17 Plus	14 March 2011	27 July 2012	Cvetković (I)
Minister of Culture, Information, and Diaspora
Bratislav Petković (1948–2021)	SNS	27 July 2012	2 September 2013	Dačić (I)
Ivan Tasovac (1966–2021)	n-p	2 September 2013	27 April 2014	Dačić (I)
Minister of Culture and Information
Ivan Tasovac (1966–2021)	n-p	27 April 2014	11 August 2016	Vučić (I)
Vladan Vukosavljević (born 1962)	n-p	11 August 2016	28 October 2020	Vučić (II); Brnabić (I)
Maja Gojković (born 1963)	SNS	28 October 2020	26 October 2022	Brnabić (II)
Minister of Culture
Maja Gojković (born 1963)	SNS	26 October 2022	2 May 2024	Brnabić (III)
Nikola Selaković (born 1983)	SNS	2 May 2024	Incumbent	Vučević (I); Macut (I)
