= Cabinet of Radoman Božović =

- 2nd Cabinet of Republic of Serbia
- 1991–1993
- Date formed: 23 December 1991
- Date dissolved: 10 February 1993

People and organisations
- Head of state: Slobodan Milošević
- Head of government: Radoman Božović
- Member parties: SPS

History
- Election: 9–23 December 1990
- Predecessor: Cabinet of Dragutin Zelenović
- Successor: Cabinet of Nikola Šainović

Cabinet of Radoman Božović was sworn in on 23 December 1991, after the previous cabinet under Dragutin Zelenović resigned due to economic failure. As a Prime Minister of Serbia he was a hardcore bureaucrat, under whom more than half of Serbian economy was under state ownership. After only 100 days in office, the inflation reached record 10,000%. His term was marked by a scandal in which two ministers from his cabinet were arrested, as well as his frequent arguments with opposition leader Vojislav Šešelj. On 10 February 1993, the new minority cabinet of Socialist Party of Serbia, supported by Serbian Radical Party, was formed as a result of the December 20, 1992 parliamentary elections. Božović, himself a Socialist, opposed the support from the Radicals, so he refused another term. This new cabinet was formed by Nikola Šainović.

== Cabinet members ==
Position	Portfolio	Name	In Office
Prime Minister	General Affairs	Radoman Božović	23 Dec 1991 - 10 Feb 1993
Deputy Prime Minister	General Affairs	Srboljub Vasović	23 Dec 1991 - 10 Feb 1993
Deputy Prime Minister	General Affairs	Zoran Anđelković	23 Dec 1991 - 10 Feb 1993
Deputy Prime Minister	General Affairs	Nebojša Maljković	23 Dec 1991 - 10 Feb 1993
Deputy Prime Minister	Finance	Jovan Zebić	23 Dec 1991 - 10 Feb 1993
Deputy Prime Minister	Mining and Energy	Nikola Šainović	23 Dec 1991 - 10 Feb 1993
Minister	Defence	Marko Negovanović	23 Dec 1991 - 10 Feb 1993
Minister	Internal Affairs	Zoran Sokolović	23 Dec 1991 - 10 Feb 1993
Minister	Foreign Affairs	Vladislav Jovanović	23 Dec 1991 - 10 Feb 1993
Minister	Economic Relations and Development	Srđan Savić	23 Dec 1991 - 10 Feb 1993
Minister	Justice	Zoran Ćetković	23 Dec 1991 - 10 Feb 1993
Minister	Agriculture, Forestry and Water Management	Jan Kišgeci	23 Dec 1991 - 10 Feb 1993
Minister	Industry	Velimir Mihajlović	23 Dec 1991 - 10 Feb 1993
Minister	Transportation	Žarko Katić	23 Dec 1991 - 10 Feb 1993
Minister	Urbanism, Comunal Affairs and Construction	Uroš Banjanin	23 Dec 1991 - 10 Feb 1993
Minister	Trade and Tourism	Sava Vlajković	23 Dec 1991 - 10 Feb 1993
Minister	Labour and Social Policy	Branka Ješić	23 Dec 1991 - 24 Sep 1992
Minister	Labour and Social Policy	Jovan Radić	24 Sep 1992 - 10 Feb 1993
Minister	Science and Technology	Divna Trajković	23 Dec 1991 - 10 Feb 1993
Minister	Education	Danilo Ž. Marković	23 Dec 1991 - 10 Feb 1993
Minister	Culture	Miodrag Đukić	23 Dec 1991 - 10 Feb 1993
Minister	Health	Nikola Mitrović	23 Dec 1991 - 10 Feb 1993
Minister	Environmental Protection	Pavle Todorović	23 Dec 1991 - 10 Feb 1993
Minister	Youth and Sports	Dragan Kićanović	23 Dec 1991 - 24 Sep 1992
Minister	Youth and Sports	Vladimir Cvetković	24 Sep 1992 - 10 Feb 1993
Minister	Diaspora	Stanko Cvijan	23 Dec 1991 - 10 Feb 1993
Minister	Religion	Dragan Dragojlović	23 Dec 1991 - 10 Feb 1993
Minister	Information	Milivoje Pavlović	23 Dec 1991 - 10 Feb 1993

== See also ==
- Cabinet of Dragutin Zelenović
- Cabinet of Nikola Šainović
- Socialist Party of Serbia
- List of prime ministers of Serbia
- Cabinet of Serbia
