= Ministry of Construction, Transport, and Infrastructure (Serbia) =

Government ministry of Serbia

- Министарство грађевинарства, саобраћаја и инфраструктуре Ministarstvo građevinarstva, saobraćaja i infrastrukture

Ministry overview
- Formed: 11 February 1991; 35 years ago
- Jurisdiction: Government of Serbia
- Headquarters: Nemanjina Street 22–26, Belgrade
- Minister responsible: Aleksandra Sofronijević
- Website: mgsi.gov.rs

The Ministry of Construction, Transport, and Infrastructure (Serbian: Министарство грађевинарства, саобраћаја и инфраструктуре, romanised: Ministarstvo građevinarstva, saobraćaja i infrastrukture) is a ministry in the Government of Serbia which is in the charge of construction, transportation, and infrastructure. The current minister is Aleksandra Sofronijević, who has been in office from 16 April 2025.

== History ==
The Ministry of Construction, Transportation, and Infrastructure was established on 11 February 1991.

The Ministry of Construction and Urbanism which existed from 1991 to 2004, and from 2012 to 2014, merged into the Ministry of Construction, Transportation, and Infrastructure.

== Sectors ==
The ministry is organized into following departments:

- Department for inspection supervision
- Department for housing and architectural policy, communal activities, and energy efficiency
- Department for road transport, roads and traffic safety
- Department for railways and intermodal transport
- Department for aviation and transport of dangerous goods
- Department for inland waterways transport and navigation safety
- Department for construction, implementation of consolidated procedures and legalisation
- Department for spatial and urban planning
- Department for international cooperation and European integration

== Subordinate bodies ==
There are several agencies and bodies subordinated to the Ministry:

- Directorate for Railways
- Directorate for Inland Waterways
- Directorate for Determination of the seaworthiness
- Agency for Port governance
- Agency for Road traffic safety
- Geodetic Institute

== List of ministers ==
Political Party: SPS SRS SPO DS NS SNS

Name	Party	Term of Office		Prime Minister (Cabinet)
Minister of Transport and Communications
Miodrag Pešić	SPS	11 February 1991	23 December 1991	Zelenović (I)
Žarko Katić	SPS	23 December 1991	18 March 1994	Božović (I); Šainović (I)
Aleksa Jokić (born 1950)	SPS	18 March 1994	28 May 1996	Marjanović (I)
Svetolik Kostadinović (born 1940)	SPS	28 May 1996	24 March 1998	Marjanović (I)
Dragan Todorović (born 1953)	SRS	24 March 1998	11 November 1999	Marjanović (II)
Ratko Marčetić (born 1942)	SRS	11 November 1999	24 October 2000	Marjanović (II)
Aleksandar Milutinović (1948–2013)	SPO	24 October 2000	25 January 2001	Minić (transitional)
Minister of Transport and Telecommunications
Marija Rašeta Vukosavljević (born 1962)	DS	25 January 2001	3 March 2004	Đinđić (I); Živković (I)
Minister of Capital Investments
Velimir Ilić (born 1951)	NS	3 March 2004	7 July 2008	Koštunica (I • II)
Minister of Infrastructure
Milutin Mrkonjić (1942–2021)	SPS	7 July 2008	14 March 2011	Cvetković (I)
Minister of Infrastructure and Energy
Milutin Mrkonjić (1942–2021)	SPS	14 March 2011	27 July 2012	Cvetković (I)
Minister of Transport
Milutin Mrkonjić (1942–2021)	SPS	27 July 2012	2 September 2013	Dačić (I)
Aleksandar Antić (born 1969)	SPS	2 September 2013	27 April 2014	Dačić (I)
Minister of Construction, Transport, and Infrastructure
Zorana Mihajlović (born 1970)	SNS	27 April 2014	28 October 2020	Vučić (I • II); Brnabić (I)
Tomislav Momirović (born 1983)	SNS	28 October 2020	26 October 2022	Brnabić (II)
Goran Vesić (born 1969)	SNS	26 October 2022	25 November 2024	Brnabić (III); Vučević (I)
Darko Glišić (born 1973)	SNS	25 November 2024	16 April 2025	acting
Aleksandra Sofronijević (born 1961)	ind.	16 April 2025	Incumbent	Macut (I)

== See also ==
- Transport in Serbia
