= Second cabinet of Mirko Marjanović =

- 5th Cabinet of Republic of Serbia
- 1998–2000
- Date formed: 24 March 1998
- Date dissolved: 24 October 2000

People and organisations
- Head of state: Milan Milutinović
- Head of government: Mirko Marjanović
- Member parties: SPS; JUL; SRS

History
- Predecessor: First cabinet of Mirko Marjanović
- Successor: Cabinet of Milomir Minić

The Second cabinet of Mirko Marjanović was elected on 24 March 1998, by the parliament of Serbia. The governing coalition was formed by Socialist Party of Serbia (SPS), Yugoslav Left (JUL), and Serbian Radical Party (SRS). After the signing of Kumanovo Agreement and the entry of NATO forces in the Serbian province of Kosovo and Metohija, all members of the Government from the Serbian Radical Party handed in their resignations, while continuing to perform their duties until the end of term.

== Cabinet members ==
Position	Portfolio	Name	In Office	Party
Prime Minister	General Affairs	Mirko Marjanović	24 March 1998 - 24 October 2000	SPS
Deputy Prime Minister	General Affairs	Milovan Bojić	24 March 1998 - 24 October 2000	JUL
Deputy Prime Minister	General Affairs	Ratko Marković	24 March 1998 - 24 October 2000	SPS
Deputy Prime Minister	General Affairs	Dragan Tomić	24 March 1998 - 24 October 2000	SPS
Deputy Prime Minister	General Affairs	Vojislav Šešelj * Resigned on 14 June 1999, but continued to perform his duties	24 March 1998 - 24 October 2000	SRS
Deputy Prime Minister	General Affairs	Tomislav Nikolić * Resigned on 14 June 1999, but continued to perform his duties	24 March 1998 - 20 November 1999	SRS
Deputy Prime Minister	General Affairs	Zoran Todorović	20 November 1999 - 24 October 2000	SRS
Minister	Internal Affairs	Vlajko Stojiljković * Mirko Marjanović was an acting minister after 9 October 2000	24 March 1998 - 9 October 2000	SPS
Minister	Finance	Borislav Milačić	24 March 1998 - 24 October 2000	JUL
Minister	Justice	Dragoljub Janković	24 March 1998 - 24 October 2000	JUL
Minister	Local Self-Government	Gordana Pop-Lazić * Resigned on 14 June 1999, but continued to perform her duties	24 March 1998 - 24 October 2000	SRS
Minister	Agriculture and Forestry	Jovan Babović	24 March 1998 - 24 October 2000	SPS
Minister	Industry	Luka Mitrović * Resigned on 14 June 1999, but continued to perform his duties	24 March 1998 - 24 October 2000	SRS
Minister	Mining	Života Ćosić	24 March 1998 - 24 October 2000	SPS
Minister	Transportation	Dragan Todorović * Resigned on 14 June 1999, but continued to perform his duties	24 March 1998 - 24 October 2000	SRS
Minister	Construction	Dejan Kovačević	24 March 1998 - 24 October 2000	SPS
Minister	Trade	Zoran Krasić * Resigned on 14 June 1999, but continued to perform his duties	24 March 1998 - 24 October 2000	SRS
Minister	Tourism	Slobodan Čerović	24 March 1998 - 24 October 2000	Nonpartisan
Minister	Ownership and Economic Transformation	Jorgovanka Tabaković * Resigned on 14 June 1999, but continued to perform her duties	24 March 1998 - 24 October 2000	SRS
Minister	Labour, Veteran and Social Policy	Tomislav Milenković	24 March 1998 - 24 October 2000	SPS
Minister	Family Services	Rada Trajković * Resigned on 14 June 1999, but continued to perform her duties	24 March 1998 - 24 October 2000	SRS
Minister	Science	Branislav Ivković	24 March 1998 - 24 October 2000	SPS
Minister	Education	Jovo Todorović	24 March 1998 - 11 April 2000	SPS
Minister	Education	Milivoje Simonović	11 April 2000 - 10 June 2000	JUL
Minister	Education	Katarina Lazović	10 June 2000 - 24 October 2000	SPS
Minister	Culture	Nada Popović-Perišić	24 March 1998 - 20 August 1998	SPS
Minister	Culture	Željko Simić	20 August 1998 - 24 October 2000	SPS
Minister	Health	Leposava Milićević	24 March 1998 - 13 July 2000	JUL
Minister	Health	Milovan Bojić	13 July 2000 - 24 October 2000	JUL
Minister	Environmental Protection	Branislav Blažić * Resigned on 14 June 1999, but continued to perform his duties	24 March 1998 - 24 October 2000	SRS
Minister	Sport	Zoran Anđelković	24 March 1998 - 24 October 2000	SPS
Minister	Serbian Diaspora	Milorad Mirčić * Resigned on 14 June 1999, but continued to perform his duties	24 March 1998 - 24 October 2000	SRS
Minister	Religion	Milovan Radovanović * Resigned on 14 June 1999, but continued to perform his duties	24 March 1998 - 24 October 2000	SRS
Minister	Information	Aleksandar Vučić * Resigned on 14 June 1999, but continued to perform his duties	24 March 1998 - 24 October 2000	SRS
Minister	Without portfolio	Milan Beko	24 March 1998 - 1 July 1998	Nonpartisan
Minister	Without portfolio	Čedomir Vasiljević * Resigned on 14 June 1999, but continued to perform his duties	24 March 1998 - 24 October 2000	SRS
Minister	Without portfolio	Maja Gojković * Resigned on 14 June 1999, but continued to perform her duties	24 March 1998 - 11 November 1999	SRS
Minister	Without portfolio	Božidar Vučurević	11 November 1999 - 24 October 2000	SRS
Minister	Without portfolio	Paja Momčilov	24 March 1998 - 24 October 2000	SPS
Minister	Without portfolio	Đura Lazić	24 March 1998 - 24 October 2000	SPS
Minister	Without portfolio	Slobodan Tomović	24 March 1998 - 11 November 1999	SPS
Minister	Without portfolio	Jovan Damjanović	11 November 1999 - 24 October 2000	SRS
Minister	Without portfolio	Ivan Sedlak	24 March 1998 - 24 October 2000	JUL
Minister	Without portfolio	Bogoljub Karić	20 October 1998 - 11 November 1999	Nonpartisan

== See also ==
- Cabinet of Serbia (2000–01)
- Cabinet of Serbia (2001–04)
- Cabinet of Serbia (2004–07)
- Cabinet of Serbia (2007–08)
- Cabinet of Serbia (2008–12)
- Cabinet of Serbia (2012–14)
- Cabinet of Serbia
