= Marko Kešelj =

Serbian basketball player (born 1988)

- Марко Кешељ
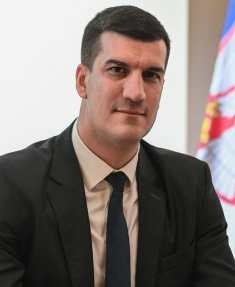

State Secretary in the Ministry of Sports
- Incumbent
- Assumed office 4 November 2022
- Minister: Zoran Gajić

Member of the National Assembly of Serbia
- In office 1 August 2022 – 10 November 2022
- President: Vladimir Orlić

Personal details
- Born: 2 January 1988 (age 38) Belgrade, SR Serbia, SFR Yugoslavia
- Party: SNS (2022–present)
- Basketball career

Personal information
- Listed height: 2.08 m (6 ft 10 in)
- Listed weight: 94 kg (207 lb)

Career information
- NBA draft: 2010: undrafted
- Playing career: 2004–2019
- Position: Small forward
- Number: 4, 6, 10

Career history
- 2004–2006: Avala Ada/Mega Ishrana
- 2006–2007: Akasvayu Girona
- 2007–2008: Köln 99ers
- 2008–2010: Crvena zvezda
- 2010–2012: Olympiacos
- 2012–2013: Valencia
- 2013: Le Mans Sarthe
- 2013–2014: ASVEL Basket
- 2014–2015: Mega Vizura / Leks
- 2016: Lavrio
- 2016–2017: Oostende
- 2017–2019: Crvena zvezda

Career highlights
- EuroLeague champion (2012); FIBA EuroCup winner (2007); Adriatic League champion (2019); 2× Serbian League champion (2018, 2019); Greek League champion (2012); Greek Cup winner (2011); Adriatic Supercup winner (2018)
Medals
Men's basketball
Representing Serbia
Universiade
Gold medal – first place	2009 Belgrade	National Team
U20 European Championship
Gold medal – first place	2008 Latvia	U20 National Team
U19 World Championship
Gold medal – first place	2007 Serbia	U19 National Team

Marko Kešelj (Serbian Cyrillic: Марко Кешељ, born 2 January 1988) is a Serbian politician and former professional basketball player who has served as the state secretary in the Ministry of Sports since 4 November 2022. He previously served as a member of the National Assembly from 1 August 2022 until his resignation on 10 November.

Kešelj is also a presidency member of Crvena zvezda. He represented the Serbia national team in the international competitions. Kešelj is a 2.08 m (6 ft 10 in) tall small forward.

== Basketball career ==
=== Early career and Olympiacos ===
Kešelj was born in Belgrade to a family of basketball background. His late father played basketball and his mother was a national team player. At the age of six, he wanted to begin training at the age of six, but his mother opposed his dream to be a basketball player because he could not even reach the hoop. Upon attending Tadić Basketball School in Dedinje, Kešelj made his debut in senior basketball with Avala Ada.

Kešelj started his career in his hometown with a club called Mega Ishrana. Despite his young age, he already has the experience of playing for two top-quality foreign clubs, the Spanish ACB League club Akasvayu Girona and the German League club Köln 99ers. In 2006, his talents were spotted by Serbian coach Svetislav Pešić, who brought him to Girona in the Spanish ACB League at the age of 18. HHowever, Kešelj could not establish himself in the squad nor did he get much playing time. In 2007, Kešelj transferred to the German League club Köln 99ers, led by another Serbian coach, Saša Obradović. Following a decent season, Obradović left to manage Kyiv and Kešelj also started looking for a transfer.

Upon rumors that Pešić, his mentor from his Girona days, might be taking over Crvena zvezda, Keselj decided to sign with the club in summer 2008, even before the coach officially arrived. In 2010, he signed a three-year contract with the Greek League club Olympiacos. With Olympiacos, he won the EuroLeague and Greek League championships in 2012.

=== Valencia, Le Mans, and Mega Vizura ===
On 14 August 2012, Kešelj signed one-year contract with Valencia. On 5 February 2013, he left Valencia and signed with Le Mans Sarthe Basket for the rest of the season. On 8 August 2013, he signed a one-year contract with ASVEL Basket.

On 14 October 2014, signed an open contract with the Serbian team Mega Vizura. On 17 June 2015 it was confirmed that Kešelj would play with the Portland Trail Blazers at the 2015 NBA Summer League.

=== Lavrio, return to Serbia, and retirement ===
On 6 January 2016, Kešelj signed with the Greek club Lavrio for the rest of the 2015–16 Greek Basket League season. On 18 September, he signed with Belgian club Telenet Oostende. On 28 July 2017, Kešelj returned to Crvena zvezda, signing a two-year contract. On 4 January 2019, he scored 20 points for the night and his 1000th point for the Zvezda.

== National team career ==
Kešelj was a member of the Serbian junior national teams, and he played at the 2007 FIBA Under-19 World Championship in Novi Sad and at the 2008 FIBA Europe Under-20 Championship. Kešelj was also a member of the senior Serbia national team at the 2010 FIBA World Championship, where Serbia was defeated by Lithuania, in the game for the bronze medal. He also represented Serbia at the EuroBasket 2011 in Lithuania, where Serbia finished in eighth place.

== Career statistics ==
Legend
GP	Games played	GS	Games started	MPG	Minutes per game
FG%	Field-goal percentage	3P%	3-point field-goal percentage	FT%	Free-throw percentage
RPG	Rebounds per game	APG	Assists per game	SPG	Steals per game
BPG	Blocks per game	PPG	Points per game	PIR	Performance index rating
**Bold**	Career high

=== EuroLeague ===
†	Denotes seasons in which Kešelj won the EuroLeague

Year	Team	GP	GS	MPG	FG%	3P%	FT%	RPG	APG	SPG	BPG	PPG	PIR
2010–11	Olympiacos	12	3	12.3	**.476**	**.435**	.500	1.0	.2	.3	**.3**	3.8	2.1
2011–12†	Olympiacos	**14**	**8**	**15.6**	.396	.270	**.600**	**2.0**	.3	**.4**	—	**3.9**	**2.4**
2017–18	Crvena zvezda	6	0	6.0	.000	.000	—	1.0	**.5**	—	—	0.0	-0.3
Career		32	11	12.6	.398	.308	.538	1.4	.3	.3	.1	3.2	1.8

== Post-playing career ==
In August 2020, Kešelj was appointed presidency member of Crvena zvezda in charge of the sport issues. He was re-elected for a five-year term on 27 December 2021. Following the resignation of Predrag Danilović as the president of the Basketball Federation of Serbia (KSS), Sport Klub mentioned Kešelj as one of the main contenders for the position.

=== Political career ===
Kešelj appeared on the Serbian Progressive Party (SNS)-led Together We Can Do Everything ballot list for the 2022 general election, as an independent candidate. Following the election, Kešelj was elected to the National Assembly as MP. Kešelj was appointed state secretary in the Ministry of Sports on 4 November 2022. On 10 November, he resigned as MP. Kešelj is a member of the main board of SNS.

== Personal life ==
Kešelj owns and operates a blueberry orchard. He is married and has two sons.

== See also ==
- List of Serbian NBA Summer League players
- List of Serbia men's national basketball team players
