= Ministry of Sports (Serbia) =

Government ministry of Serbia

- Министарство спорта Ministarstvo sporta

Ministry overview
- Formed: 11 February 1991; 35 years ago
- Jurisdiction: Government of Serbia
- Headquarters: Palace of Serbia, Bulevar Mihajla Pupina 2, Belgrade
- Minister responsible: Zoran Gajić
- Website: mos.gov.rs

The Ministry of Sports (Serbian: Министарство спорта, romanized: Ministarstvo sporta) of the Republic of Serbia (Serbian: Министарство спорта, romanized: Ministarstvo sporta) is a ministry in the Government of Serbia, responsible for sports. The current minister is Zoran Gajić, in office since 26 October 2022.

== History ==
The ministry of Youth and Sports was established on 11 February 1991. From 2001 to 2007, the ministry was merged into and part of the Ministry of Education.

== List of ministers ==
Political Party: SPS G17 Plus n-p

Name	Party	Term of Office		Prime Minister (Cabinet)
Minister of Youth and Sports
Goran Trivan (born 1962)	SPS	11 February 1991	31 July 1991	Zelenović (I)
Dragan Kićanović (born 1953)	SPS	31 July 1991	24 September 1992	Zelenović (I); Božović (I)
Vladimir Cvetković (1941–2026)	SPS	24 September 1992	24 March 1998	Božović (I); Šainović (I); Marjanović (I)
Zoran Anđelković (born 1958)	SPS	24 March 1998	24 October 2000	Marjanović (II)
Svetozar Mijailović (born 1947)	SPS	24 October 2000	25 January 2001	Minić (transitional)
Ministry merged into the Ministry of Education
Minister of Youth and Sports
Snežana Samardžić-Marković (born 1966)	G17 Plus	15 May 2007	8 February 2012	Koštunica (II); Cvetković (I)
Verica Kalanović (born 1954); Acting Minister	G17 Plus	8 February 2012	27 July 2012	Cvetković (I)
Alisa Marić (born 1970)	n-p	27 July 2012	2 September 2013	Dačić (I)
Vanja Udovičić (born 1982)	n-p	2 September 2013	26 October 2022	Dačić (I); Vučić (I • II); Brnabić (I • II)
Minister of Sports
Zoran Gajić (born 1958)	n-p	26 October 2022	Incumbent	Brnabić (III); Vučević (I)
