= Cabinet of Ana Brnabić =

Cabinet of Ana Brnabić may refer to:

- First cabinet of Ana Brnabić
- Second cabinet of Ana Brnabić
- Third cabinet of Ana Brnabić
