= Cabinet of Dragutin Zelenović =

- 1st Cabinet of Republic of Serbia
- 1991
- Date formed: 11 February 1991
- Date dissolved: 23 December 1991

People and organisations
- Head of state: Slobodan Milošević
- Head of government: Dragutin Zelenović
- Member parties: SPS

History
- Election: 9–23 December 1990
- Predecessor: Cabinet of Stanko Radmilović
- Successor: Cabinet of Radoman Božović

After the absolute victory of the Socialists in the Parliamentary Election, Dragutin Zelenović of the Socialist Party of Serbia was elected Prime Minister of Serbia by the Parliament on 15 January 1991. On 11 February, his cabinet was formed and elected by the Serbian National Assembly. Zelenović eventually lost support from the party leadership and resigned, causing the new Government to be formed on 23 December 1991.

== Cabinet members ==
Position	Portfolio	Name	In Office
Prime Minister	General Affairs	Dragutin Zelenović	15 Jan 1991 - 23 Dec 1991
Deputy Prime Minister	General Affairs	Velimir Radivojević	11 Feb 1991 - 23 Dec 1991
Deputy Prime Minister	General Affairs	Nikola Stanić	11 Feb 1991 - 23 Dec 1991
Deputy Prime Minister	Finance	Jovan Zebić	11 Feb 1991 - 23 Dec 1991
Deputy Prime Minister	Development of Economic Relations	Slobodan Prohaska	11 Feb 1991 - 23 Dec 1991
Minister	Defence	Miodrag Jokić	11 Feb 1991 - 31 Jul 1991
Minister	Defence	Tomislav Simović	31 Jul 1991 - 23 Dec 1991
Minister	Internal Affairs	Radmilo Bogdanović	11 Feb 1991 - 30 May 1991
Minister	Internal Affairs	Zoran Sokolović	30 May 1991 - 23 Dec 1991
Minister	Foreign Affairs	Branko Mikašinović	11 Feb 1991 - 31 Jul 1991
Minister	Foreign Affairs	Vladislav Jovanović	31 Jul 1991 - 23 Dec 1991
Minister	Justice	Predrag Todorović	11 Feb 1991 - 23 Dec 1991
Minister	Agriculture, Forestry and Water Management	Veljko Simin	11 Feb 1991 - 23 Dec 1991
Minister	Industry	Dušan Matković	11 Feb 1991 - 23 Dec 1991
Minister	Mining and Energy	Nikola Šainović	11 Feb 1991 - 23 Dec 1991
Minister	Transportation	Mile Pešić	11 Feb 1991 - 23 Dec 1991
Minister	Urbanism, Comunal Affairs and Construction	Miodrag Janjić	11 Feb 1991 - 23 Dec 1991
Minister	Trade and Tourism	Tefik Lugići	11 Feb 1991 - 23 Dec 1991
Minister	Labour and Social Policy	Branka Ješić	11 Feb 1991 - 23 Dec 1991
Minister	Science and Technology	Dragutin Zelenović (acting)	11 Feb 1991 - 23 Dec 1991
Minister	Education	Dimitrije Dimitrijević	11 Feb 1991 - 21 Jun 1991
Minister	Education	Danilo Ž. Marković	21 Jun 1991 - 23 Dec 1991
Minister	Culture	Radomir Šaranović	11 Feb 1991 - 23 Dec 1991
Minister	Health and Environment Protection	Nikola Mitrović	11 Feb 1991 - 23 Dec 1991
Minister	Youth and Sports	Goran Trivan	11 Feb 1991 - 31 Jul 1991
Minister	Youth and Sports	Dragan Kićanović	31 Jul 1991 - 23 Dec 1991
Minister	Religion	Dragan Dragojlović	11 Feb 1991 - 23 Dec 1991
Minister	Diaspora	Stanko Cvijan	11 Feb 1991 - 23 Dec 1991
Minister	Information	Ratomir Vico	11 Feb 1991 - 23 Dec 1991

== See also ==
- Socialist Party of Serbia
- Dragutin Zelenović
- Cabinet of Serbia
