= Cabinet of Aleksandar Vučić =

Cabinet of Aleksandar Vučić may refer to:

- First cabinet of Aleksandar Vučić
- Second cabinet of Aleksandar Vučić
