= Cabinet of Nikola Šainović =

- 3rd Cabinet of Republic of Serbia
- 1993–1994
- Date formed: 10 February 1993
- Date dissolved: 18 March 1994

People and organisations
- Head of state: Slobodan Milošević
- Head of government: Nikola Šainović
- Member parties: SPS, SRS (minority support)

History
- Election: December 20, 1992
- Predecessor: Cabinet of Radoman Božović
- Successor: Cabinet of Mirko Marjanović

On February 10, 1993, the Cabinet of Nikola Šainović was sworn in before the National Assembly. This minority government was supported by the Serbian Radical Party, even though all the Cabinet members were from Socialist Party of Serbia. Due to hyperinflation, the President of Serbia disbanded this Cabinet, and called for new Parliamentary Election.

== Cabinet members ==
Position	Portfolio	Name	Image	In Office
Prime Minister	General Affairs	Nikola Šainović		10 Feb 1993 – 18 March 1994
Deputy Prime Minister	General Affairs	Zoran Anđelković		10 Feb 1993 – 18 March 1994
Deputy Prime Minister	General Affairs	Srboljub Vasović		10 Feb 1993 – 18 March 1994
Deputy Prime Minister	General Affairs	Dragoslav Jovanović		10 Feb 1993 – 18 March 1994
Deputy Prime Minister	General Affairs	Danilo Ž. Marković		10 Feb 1993 – 18 March 1994
Minister	Education	Danilo Ž. Marković		10 Feb 1993 – 18 March 1994
Minister	Education	Milivoje Lazić		10 Feb 1993 – 18 March 1994
Minister	Foreign Affairs	Vladislav Jovanović		10 Feb 1993 – 4 March 1993
Minister	Internal Affairs	Zoran Sokolović		10 Feb 1993 – 18 March 1994
Minister	Defence	Marko Negovanović		10 Feb 1993 – 18 March 1994
Minister	Finance	Slavoljub Stanić		10 Feb 1993 – 18 March 1994
Minister	Economic Relations with Abroad	Radoslav Mitrović		10 Feb 1993 – 18 March 1994
Minister	Justice	Tomislav Ilić		10 Feb 1993 – 18 March 1994
Minister	Agriculture, Forestry and Water Management	Jan Kišgeci		10 Feb 1993 – 18 March 1994
Minister	Industry	Momir Pavlićević		10 Feb 1993 – 18 March 1994
Minister	Mining and Energy	Vladimir Živanović		10 Feb 1993 – 18 March 1994
Minister	Transportation and Connections	Žarko Katić		10 Feb 1993 – 18 March 1994
Minister	Urbanism, Communal Affairs and Construction	Uroš Banjanin		10 Feb 1993 – 18 March 1994
Minister	Trade and Tourism	Velimir Mihajlović		10 Feb 1993 – 12 Feb 1993
Minister	Trade and Tourism	Radiša Đorđević		14 July 1993 – 18 March 1994
Minister	Labour, Veteran and Social Policy	Jovan Radić		10 Feb 1993 – 14 July 1993
Minister	Labour, Veteran and Social Policy	Nikola Ristivojević		14 July 1993 – 18 March 1994
Minister	Science and Technology	Slobodan Unković		10 Feb 1993 – 18 March 1994
Minister	Culture	Đoko Stojčić		10 Feb 1993 – 18 March 1994
Minister	Health	Miloš Banićević		10 Feb 1993 – 14 July 1993
Minister	Health	Borislav Antić		14 July 1993 – 18 March 1994
Minister	Environmental Protection	Pavle Todorović		10 Feb 1993 – 18 March 1994
Minister	Youth and Sports	Vladimir Cvetković		10 Feb 1993 – 18 March 1994
Minister	Religion	Dragan Dragojlović		10 Feb 1993 – 18 March 1994
Minister	Diaspora	Bogoljub Bjelica		10 Feb 1993 – 18 March 1994
Minister	Information	Milivoje Pavlović		10 Feb 1993 – 18 March 1994

== See also ==
- Cabinet of Dragutin Zelenović
- Cabinet of Radoman Božović
- List of prime ministers of Serbia
- Cabinet of Serbia
