= Cabinet of Ivica Dačić =

2012–2014 government of Serbia

- 12th Cabinet of Republic of Serbia
- 2012 - 2014
- Date formed: 27 July 2012
- Date dissolved: 27 April 2014

People and organisations
- Head of state: Tomislav Nikolić
- Head of government: Ivica Dačić
- Member parties: SNS; SPS; SDPS; URS (until 2013); PUPS; NS; SDAS; PS

History
- Election: May 6, 2012
- Predecessor: Cabinet of Mirko Cvetković
- Successor: First cabinet of Aleksandar Vučić

The Cabinet of Ivica Dačić was elected on 27 July 2012 by a majority vote in the National Assembly. The coalition government was composed of the Let's Get Serbia Moving alliance, the SPS-PUPS-JS, and United Regions of Serbia. The Cabinet was reshuffled on 2 September 2013.

== Supporting parties ==
Party	Main ideology	Political position	Leader
Government parties
Serbian Progressive Party (SNS)	Populism	Big tent	Aleksandar Vučić
Socialist Party of Serbia (SPS)	Social democracy	Centre-left	Ivica Dačić
Party of United Pensioners of Serbia (PUPS)	Pensioners' interests	Centre-left	Jovan Krkobabić
Movement of Socialists (PS)	Left-wing nationalism	Left-wing	Aleksandar Vulin
Social Democratic Party of Serbia (SDPS)	Social democracy	Centre-left	Rasim Ljajić
New Serbia (NS)	Conservatism	Right-wing	Velimir Ilić
Party of Democratic Action of Sandžak (SDAS)	Bosniak minority interests	Right-wing	Sulejman Ugljanin
United Regions of Serbia (URS)	Liberal conservatism	Centre-right	Mlađan Dinkić
Confidence and supply
United Serbia (JS)	National conservatism	Right-wing	Dragan Marković
Alliance of Vojvodina Hungarians (VMSZ)	Hungarian minority interests	Centre-right	István Pásztor

== Cabinet members ==
Position	Portfolio	Name	Image	In Office	Party
Prime Minister	General Affairs	Ivica Dačić		27 July 2012 - 27 April 2014	SPS
Minister	Internal Affairs	Ivica Dačić		27 July 2012 - 27 April 2014	SPS
First Deputy Prime Minister	Fight against Crime and Corruption	Aleksandar Vučić		27 July 2012 - 27 April 2014	SNS
Minister	Defence	Aleksandar Vučić		27 July 2012 - 2 September 2013	SNS
Minister	Defence	Nebojša Rodić		2 September 2013 - 27 April 2014	SNS
Minister	Trade and Communication	Rasim Ljajić		27 July 2012 - 27 April 2014	SDPS
Minister	Labour, Employment and Social Policy	Jovan Krkobabić * Zoran Martinović was an Acting Minister after the death of Krkobabić		27 July 2012 - 22 April 2014†	PUPS
Minister	Finance and Economy	Mlađan Dinkić		27 July 2012 - 2 September 2013	URS
Minister	Finance	Lazar Krstić		2 September 2013 - 27 April 2014	Nonpartisan
Minister	Economy	Saša Radulović * Igor Mirović was an Acting Minister after the resignation of Radulović		2 September 2013 - 24 January 2014	Nonpartisan
Minister	Foreign Affairs	Ivan Mrkić		27 July 2012 - 27 April 2014	Nonpartisan
Minister	Regional Development and Local Self-Government	Verica Kalanović		27 July 2012 - 2 September 2013	URS
Minister	Regional Development and Local Self-Government	Igor Mirović		2 September 2013 - 27 April 2014	SNS
Minister	Transportation	Milutin Mrkonjić		27 July 2012 - 2 September 2013	SPS
Minister	Transportation	Aleksandar Antić		2 September 2013 - 27 April 2014	SPS
Minister	Construction and Urbanism	Velimir Ilić		27 July 2012 - 27 April 2014	NS
Minister	Justice and Public Administration	Nikola Selaković		27 July 2012 - 27 April 2014	SNS
Minister	Agriculture, Forestry and Water Management	Goran Knežević		27 July 2012 - 2 September 2013	SNS
Minister	Agriculture, Forestry and Water Management	Dragan Glamočić		2 September 2013 - 27 April 2014	Nonpartisan
Minister	Education	Žarko Obradović		27 July 2012 - 2 September 2013	SPS
Minister	Education	Tomislav Jovanović		2 September 2013 - 27 April 2014	Nonpartisan
Minister	Health	Slavica Đukić-Dejanović		27 July 2012 - 27 April 2014	SPS
Minister	Energy, Development and Environmental Protection	Zorana Mihajlović		27 July 2012 - 27 April 2014	SNS
Minister	Culture and Information	Bratislav Petković		27 July 2012 - 2 September 2013	SNS
Minister	Culture and Information	Ivan Tasovac		2 September 2013 - 27 April 2014	Nonpartisan
Minister	Natural Resources, Mining and Spatial Planning	Milan Bačević		27 July 2012 - 27 April 2014	SNS
Minister	Youth and Sports	Alisa Marić		27 July 2012 - 2 September 2013	Nonpartisan
Minister	Youth and Sports	Vanja Udovičić		2 September 2013 - 27 April 2014	SNS
Deputy Prime Minister	European Integration	Suzana Grubješić		27 July 2012 - 2 September 2013	URS
Minister without portfolio	European Integration	Branko Ružić		2 September 2013 - 27 April 2014	SPS
Minister without portfolio	Kosovo and Metohija	Aleksandar Vulin		2 September 2013 - 27 April 2014	PS
Minister without portfolio	Sustainable development	Sulejman Ugljanin		27 July 2012 - 27 April 2014	SDAS

== See also ==
- Cabinet of Mirko Cvetković
- Cabinet of Aleksandar Vučić (disambiguation)
- Cabinet of Serbia
