= Ministry of Health (Serbia) =

Government ministry of Serbia

- Министарство здравља Ministarstvo zdravlja

Ministry overview
- Formed: 11 February 1991; 35 years ago
- Jurisdiction: Government of Serbia
- Headquarters: Nemanjina Street 22–26, Belgrade
- Minister responsible: Zlatibor Lončar
- Website: zdravlje.gov.rs

The Ministry of Health (Serbian: Министарство здравља, romanized: Ministarstvo zdravlja) is a ministry in the Government of Serbia. The current minister is Zlatibor Lončar, in office since 2 May 2024.

== Organization ==
The ministry is organized into following departments:

- Department for inspection works
- Department for healthcare insurance
- Department for public health health i programmatic health care
- Department for international cooperation and European integration
- Department for drugs and medical instruments
- Department for organization of health service

== List of ministers ==
Political Party: SPS JUL DSS G17 Plus SDP SDPS n-p SNS

No.	Portrait	Minister	Took office	Left office	Time in office	Party	Cabinet
Minister of Health and Environmental Protection
1	Nikola Mitrović	Nikola Mitrović (1932–2006)	11 February 1991	23 December 1991	315 days	SPS (endorsement)	Zelenović
Minister of Health
(1)	Nikola Mitrović	Nikola Mitrović (1932–2006)	23 December 1991	10 February 1993	1 year, 49 days	SPS (endorsement)	Božović
2	Miloš Banićević	Miloš Banićević (born 1939)	10 February 1993	14 July 1993	154 days	SPS	Šainović
3	Borislav Antić	Borislav Antić (?–1999)	14 July 1993	18 March 1994	247 days	SPS	Šainović
4	Leposava Milićević	Leposava Milićević (born 1950)	18 March 1994	13 July 2000	6 years, 117 days	JUL	Marjanović I–II
5	Milovan Bojić	Milovan Bojić (born 1955)	13 July 2000	24 October 2000	103 days	JUL	Marjanović II
6	Nada Kostić	Nada Kostić (born 1956)	24 October 2000	25 January 2001	93 days	DSS	Minić
7	Obren Joksimović	Obren Joksimović (1952–2021)	25 January 2001	22 October 2001	270 days	DSS	Đinđić–Živković
–	Uroš Jovanović	Uroš Jovanović; Acting	22 October 2001	19 June 2002	240 days	?	Đinđić–Živković
8	Tomica Milosavljević	Tomica Milosavljević (born 1955)	19 June 2002	28 August 2003	1 year, 70 days	G17+	Đinđić–Živković
–	Dragomir Marisavljević	Dragomir Marisavljević (born 1960); Acting	28 August 2003	3 March 2004	188 days	G17+	Đinđić–Živković
(8)	Tomica Milosavljević	Tomica Milosavljević (born 1955)	3 March 2004	9 November 2006	2 years, 251 days	G17+	Koštunica I
–	Nevena Karanović	Nevena Karanović (born 1961); Acting	9 November 2006	14 November 2006	5 days	G17+	Koštunica I
–	Slobodan Lalović	Slobodan Lalović (born 1954); Acting	14 November 2006	15 May 2007	182 days	Social Democratic Party	Koštunica I
(8)	Tomica Milosavljević	Tomica Milosavljević (born 1955)	15 May 2007	21 February 2011	3 years, 282 days	G17+	Koštunica II; Cvetković
–	Rasim Ljajić	Rasim Ljajić (born 1964); Acting	21 February 2011	14 March 2011	21 days	SDPS	Cvetković
9	Zoran Stanković	Zoran Stanković (1954–2021)	14 March 2011	27 July 2012	1 year, 135 days	Independent	Cvetković
10	Slavica Đukić Dejanović	Slavica Đukić Dejanović (born 1951)	27 July 2012	27 April 2014	1 year, 274 days	SPS	Dačić
11	Zlatibor Lončar	Zlatibor Lončar (born 1971)	27 April 2014	26 October 2022	8 years, 182 days	SNS	Vučić I–II; Brnabić I–II
12	Danica Grujičić	Danica Grujičić (born 1959)	26 October 2022	2 May 2024	1 year, 189 days	Independent	Brnabić III
(11)	Zlatibor Lončar	Zlatibor Lončar (born 1971)	2 May 2024	Incumbent	2 years, 98 days	SNS	Vučević; Macut

== See also ==
- Healthcare in Serbia
- List of hospitals in Serbia
