= Cabinet of Mirko Marjanović =

Cabinet of Mirko Marjanović may refer to:

- First cabinet of Mirko Marjanović
- Second cabinet of Mirko Marjanović
