= Nikola Mitrović (politician) =

Serbian medical doctor (1932–2006)

Nikola Mitrović (Serbian Cyrillic: Никола Митровић; 17 March 1932 – 2 November 2006) was a Serbian medical doctor, administrator, and politician. He was Serbia's minister of health from 1991 to 1993.

== Early life and career ==
Mitrović was born in Šabac, in what was then the Drina Banovina of the Kingdom of Yugoslavia. A neuropsychiatrist and radiologist, he was director of the Institute of Oncology and Radiology in Belgrade for several years. In 1989, he discussed the arrival of nuclear magnetic resonance technology at the institute.

== Minister of Health ==
The Socialist Party of Serbia (SPS) won a landslide majority victory in the 1990 Serbian parliamentary election (in which Mitrović was not a candidate), and on 11 February 1991 the Serbian parliament approved a new ministry led by Dragutin Zelenović. Mitrović was appointed as health minister; initially, his full title was Minister of Health and Environmental Protection. He was possibly the only government minister who worked on a voluntary basis, not accepting a salary for his position.

Mitrović promised major changes in health care shortly after his appointment, saying that more emphasis would be placed on the prevention of illness and that doctors would be given a greater voice in determining standards for the sector. He said, "our healthcare system developed in reverse order, so the focus was always on healthcare services instead of healthcare, and through 'fair' insurance, some were treated in sheds, some in apartments, some abroad." He criticized an undue focus on funding health service capacity over function and efficiency (e.g., making more beds available than were required), promised insurance reform that would allow patients to choose their doctors and institutions, and allowed for the return of "family doctors" and home visits.

Most of Serbia's social institutions, including the health sector, fell into crisis before and during the Yugoslav Wars of the 1990s. In May 1991, Mitrović proposed a temporary system of additional health fees to make up for a significant deficit, notwithstanding his personal opposition to such measures. The following month, he threatened to resign if the government did not find adequate resources for the health sector. He later said that Serbia's medical shortages were primarily the result of a lack of funding rather than disrupted supply channels due to the conflict; on one occasion, he identified drug manufacturers as the biggest culprit for hospital debts and shortages and criticized Serbia's policy of an independent formation of drug prices, saying it gave too much power to the manufacturers.

Dragutin Zelenović stood down as Serbian prime minister on 23 December 1991 and was replaced by Radoman Božović, who made some changes in the cabinet. Mitrović was retained in office but re-designated simply as Serbia's Minister of Health. In early 1992, he brought forward a health sector reform package that permitted private, joint-stock, and public health providers to receive equal treatment under the law, as well as allowing practitioners to take additional work beyond regular work. He also introduced two types of insurance, mandatory and voluntary, with the latter providing greater health care rights. The Serbian parliament approved the reforms on 25 March 1992.

The international sanctions against the Federal Republic of Yugoslavia that began in April 1992 caused further strains on Serbia's health system. In addition, Mitrović faced criticism for his oversight of a labour–management dispute at the Dedinje Institute for Cardiovascular Diseases and his decision to temporarily close the institute. The newspaper Borba reported in June 1992 that he had twice submitted his resignation, only to have it rejected both times. The following month, Borba described Mitrović's dissatisfaction with his ministerial role as an "open secret," observing that he was "powerless to solve even the most innocuous problems in his department."

In October 1992, Mitrović proposed a new measure to finance mandatory types of health care with public revenues. In an interview from this period, he said that the government would replace directors of republican health institutions who were acting irrationally and reiterated his demand for greater efficiency in medical services, drawing attention to various institutions that were using scarce resources in questionable ways.

== Return to medical work ==
The Socialist Party won a reduced victory in the 1992 Serbian parliamentary election, and a new ministry under Nikola Šainović took office on 10 February 1993. Mitrović was not appointed to a new term and returned to his work as director of the Institute of Oncology and Radiology.

Mitrović obtained a linear accelerator manufactured by the American company Marian for the institute in May 1993. In March 1994, he said that, notwithstanding the continued challenges faced by Serbia, all equipment at the institute was working and that all of its patients received all the medicines paid for by insurance. He later encouraged the authorities to open an oncology dispensary in Belgrade, citing alarming rates of unnecessary deaths caused by undetected malignant tumours. At the end of 1994, the co-authored a book entitled, Malignant Diseases in Serbia at the End of the 20th Century (Truths and Misconceptions).

In a 1997 interview with Naša borba, Mitrović acknowledged that he had personally smuggled medications into Serbia during the time of international sanctions. He justified this on the grounds that there was no other way for the medications to reach the country.

Mitrović was active in procuring medical reserves during the NATO bombing of Yugoslavia in 1999. He specifically condemned the bombing of Belgrade's electrical grid, which resulted in various medical delays and equipment failures.

== Yugoslav Left official ==
Mitrović joined the Yugoslav Left (JUL) on or shortly after its founding in 1994. On 26 March 1995, he was elected to the party's executive directorate. In May 1996, he said that the party stood for "modernity, humanity, and a high degree of ethics" as well as advocating for "free health care, regardless of its cost in implementation." He was re-elected to the directorate and elected to the party's main board in July 1998.

The Yugoslav Left contested the 2000 Yugoslavian parliamentary election in an alliance with the Socialist Party of Serbia, and Mitrović appeared in the second position on the alliance's electoral list for the Palilula division, which included central Belgrade. The alliance won only one seat in the division, which was automatically assigned to its lead candidate, Ivica Dačić of the Socialist Party. Serbia's longtime authoritarian leader Slobodan Milošević was defeated in the concurrent 2000 Yugoslavian presidential election and subsequently fell from power on 5 October 2000, a watershed moment in Serbian and Yugoslavian politics. Among numerous other changes, the JUL ceased to be a credible force in Serbian politics after this time.

Mitrović resigned as director of the Institute of Oncology and Radiology on 10 October 2000.

== After 2000 ==
In March 2001, Mitrović was one of a number of former SPS and JUL officials to be arrested on corruption charges; it was alleged that he and three others "embezzled about three million dinars from the Republic Bureau for Health Insurance." The journal Vreme, in reporting on this situation, included the dry observation, "is worth hoping that [these] arrests are examples of the final implementation of the law, not just a cheap political demagogy."

It was reported in June 2002 that Mitrović had opened a Swiss bank account in 1998, containing the sum of 200,000 Swiss francs.

Mitrović died on 2 November 2006.
