= Tomislav Simović =

Serbian army general (1934–2026)

- Томислав Симовић

Minister of Defence
- In office 31 July 1991 – 23 December 1991
- President: Slobodan Milošević
- Prime Minister: Dragutin Zelenović
- Preceded by: Miodrag Jokić
- Succeeded by: Marko Negovanović

Personal details
- Born: 1934 Kingdom of Yugoslavia
- Died: 20 August 2026 (aged 92) Belgrade, Serbia
- Party: Independent

Military service
- Allegiance: Yugoslavia; FR Yugoslavia
- Branch/service: Yugoslav People's Army (JNA)
- Years of service: ?–1992
- Rank: Lieutenant colonel general
- Commands: 3rd Military Region (Skopje), South-Eastern Theatre; 37th Motorized Division (Raška)

Tomislav Simović (Serbian Cyrillic: Томислав Симовић; 1934 – 20 August 2026) was a Lieutenant colonel general of the Yugoslav People's Army and independent politician. He served as the Serbian Minister of Defence from 31 July 1991 to 23 December 1991.

Simović served as a career officer in the Yugoslav People' Army (JNA), attaining the rank of Lieutenant colonel general. He commanded the JNA Third military region headquartered in Skopje, SR Macedonia before replacing Commander Miodrag Jokić as Serbia's Minister of Defence in the cabinet of Dragutin Zelenović. During his tenure, Simović was allegedly involved with supporting Serb paramilitary forces, and composing a draft law for the establishment of a Serbian Army.

He was ousted from office following the fall of Zelenović's government in late 1991 and retired from active military duties in 1992. In 1993 Simović co-founded the Association of Military Pensioners of Serbia and served as the organization's first President from 1993 to 1995.

Simović died in Belgrade on 20 August 2026, at the age of 92.
