= Ministry of Justice (Serbia) =

Government ministry of Serbia

- Министарство правде Ministarstvo pravde

Ministry overview
- Formed: 11 February 1991; 35 years ago
- Jurisdiction: Government of Serbia
- Headquarters: Nemanjina Street 22–26, Belgrade
- Minister responsible: Nenad Vujić
- Website: mpravde.gov.rs

The Ministry of Justice (Serbian: Министарство правде, romanized: Ministarstvo pravde) is a ministry in the Government of Serbia which is in charge of the administration of justice system. The current minister is Nenad Vujić, in office since 16 April 2025.

== Organization ==
The ministry is organized into following departments:

- Department for judicial system
- Department for normative works
- Department for financial works
- Department for European integration and international projects
- Department for international cooperation and strategic planning
- State Attorney's Office
- Directorate for administration of penitentiary system
- Directorate for management of confiscated property acquired from committing felonies
- Directorate for cooperation with churches and religious communities

== List of ministers ==
Political Party: SPS JUL DOS SPO DHSS DSS DS SNS n-p

No.	Portrait	Minister	Took office	Left office	Time in office	Party	Cabinet
Minister of Justice
1	Predrag Todorović	Predrag Todorović (born 1939)	11 February 1991	23 December 1991	315 days	SPS	Zelenović
2	Zoran Ćetković	Zoran Ćetković (born 1956)	23 December 1991	10 February 1993	1 year, 49 days	SPS	Božović
3	Tomislav Ilić	Tomislav Ilić (born 1937)	10 February 1993	18 March 1994	1 year, 36 days	SPS	Šainović
4	Aranđel Markićević	Aranđel Markićević (1936–2003)	18 March 1994	24 March 1998	4 years, 6 days	SPS	Marjanović I
5	Dragoljub Janković	Dragoljub Janković (born 1945)	24 March 1998	24 October 2000	2 years, 214 days	JUL	Marjanović II
	Zoran Nikolić	Zoran Nikolić (born 1958); Co-Minister	24 October 2000	25 January 2001	93 days	SPS	Minić
	Dragan Subašić	Dragan Subašić (born 1955); Co-Minister	24 October 2000	25 January 2001	93 days	DOS	Minić
	Sead Spahović	Sead Spahović (born 1957); Co-Minister	24 October 2000	25 January 2001	93 days	SPO	Minić
6	Vladan Batić	Vladan Batić (1949–2010)	25 January 2001	3 March 2004	3 years, 38 days	DHSS	Đinđić–Živković
7	Zoran Stojković	Zoran Stojković (1946–2020)	3 March 2004	15 May 2007	3 years, 73 days	DSS	Koštunica I
8	Dušan Petrović	Dušan Petrović (born 1966)	15 May 2007	7 July 2008	1 year, 53 days	DS	Koštunica II
9	Snežana Malović	Snežana Malović (born 1976)	7 July 2008	27 July 2012	4 years, 20 days	DS	Cvetković
Minister of Justice and Public Administration
10	Nikola Selaković	Nikola Selaković (born 1983)	27 July 2012	27 April 2014	1 year, 274 days	SNS	Dačić
Minister of Justice
(10)	Nikola Selaković	Nikola Selaković (born 1983)	27 April 2014	11 August 2016	2 years, 106 days	SNS	Vučić I
11	Nela Kuburović	Nela Kuburović (born 1982)	11 August 2016	28 October 2020	4 years, 78 days	SNS	Vučić II; Brnabić
12	Maja Popović	Maja Popović (born 1972)	28 October 2020	16 April 2025	4 years, 170 days	Independent	Brnabić II–III; Vučević
13	Nenad Vujić	Nenad Vujić (born 1966)	16 April 2025	Incumbent	1 year, 115 days	Independent	Macut

== See also ==
- Judiciary of Serbia
