= Tomica Milosavljević =

Serbian doctor and politician

- Томица Милосављевић
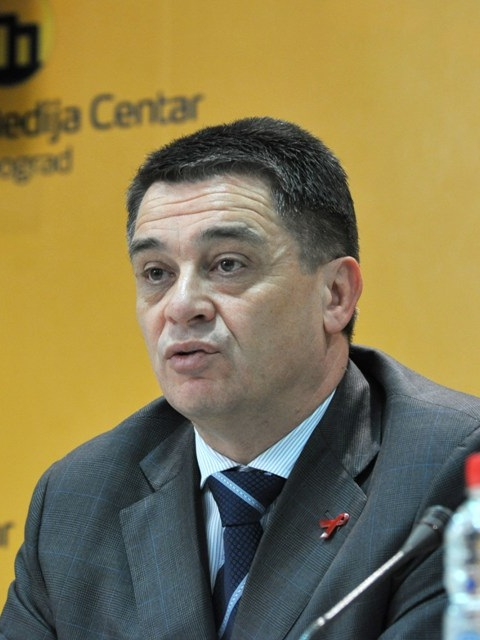

Minister of Health
- In office 15 May 2007 – 21 February 2011
- Prime Minister: Vojislav Koštunica; Mirko Cvetković
- Preceded by: Slobodan Lalović (acting)
- Succeeded by: Rasim Ljajić (acting)
- In office 3 March 2004 – 9 November 2006
- Prime Minister: Vojislav Koštunica
- Preceded by: Dragomir Marisavljević (acting)
- Succeeded by: Nevena Karanović (acting)
- In office 19 June 2002 – 28 August 2003
- Prime Minister: Zoran Đinđić; Zoran Živković
- Preceded by: Uroš Jovanović (acting)
- Succeeded by: Dragomir Marisavljević (acting)

Personal details
- Born: 24 December 1955 (age 70) Kruševac, FPR Yugoslavia
- Children: 3
- Education: University of Belgrade
- Occupation: Politician

Tomica Milosavljević (Serbian Cyrillic: Томица Милосављевић [tômit͡sa milosǎːʋʎeʋit͡ɕ]; born 24 December 1955) is a Serbian doctor and politician. He served as Minister of Health in the Government of Serbia under four Prime Ministers with the total span of seven years (2002–03, 2004–06, 2007–11). He is also employed as a full professor at the University of Belgrade and works in the Clinical Centre of Serbia in Belgrade.

== Education ==
Milosavljević completed elementary and high school in Paraćin, as the winner of Vuk diploma. He graduated from the Belgrade Medical School in 1979, where he also finished his master's degree studies in 1983 and PhD in 1988. He is a specialist of internal medicine with sub specialization of gastroenterology. Milosavljević finished professional postgraduate specialization in Munich (Klinikum rechts der Isar), Amsterdam (Academic Medical Center) and London (St Mark's Hospital).

== Medical and political career ==
He is one of the founders of once prominent Serbian political party G17 Plus, and was vice president until 2010, and Chairman of G17 plus board of the City of Belgrade, until 2009.

He was appointed as Minister of Health in the Government of Serbia for four times. In 2002 he was elected for the first time, re-elected on 18 March 2003, on 3 March 2004 and once again re-elected on 15 May 2007.

From 2005 to 2008 he served as a member of the World Health Organization's Standing Committee for Europe, and from 2009 to 2012 member of the Executive Board of WHO in Geneva. In September 2007 he was the 57th President Session of WHO Europe held in Belgrade. He has also led several European Health Conferences.

Since 2008, he has been a member of the Board of EAGEN (European Association for Gastroenterology, Endoscopy and nutrition), serving as its President (2015-2016).

Between 1996 and 2000, he was president of the Yugoslav Association of Digestive Endoscopy; from 2003-2007 the Chairman of the Yugoslav coloproctology society and from 2009 to 2013 President of the Association of Gastroenterologists of Serbia. In 2008, he was vice president of the World Congress of the International Association of Surgeons, Gastroenterologists and Oncologists (IASGO) in Beijing, China.

== Personal life ==
He is married and has three children.

== Publications ==
=== Books ===
- T.Milosavljević and I.Jovanovic. Helicobacter pylori CD - Rom edition, DanDesign in cooperation with the Faculty of Medicine, University of Belgrade, in 1999.
- T.Milosavljević . Helicobacter pylori in clinical practice. Time books, Belgrade, 1996.
- T. Milosavljevic, Mr. D.Jovanovic, V.Petrović. Helicobacter pylori, 100 questions and answers. Hemofarm Vrsac, 2000th *T.Milosavljević, M.Krstić. Diseases of the digestive system and liver in primary care. Pillars of Culture, Belgrade, 2007a.

=== Chapters in books ===
- Milosavljevic T. Primary sclerosing cholangitis. In: Teodorović J et al.: Gastroenterology, the third part of the Children newspapers Belgrade, 1991:477 - eighth
- T.Milosavljević. Jaundice (216-222) of portal hypertension (227-230) postcholecystotomy syndrome (261-262) Obstructive jaundice (264-268) cholangitis (270-271) cholangiocarcinoma (272-274) In : O.Popović . Gastroenterology 100 lessons - a manual for physicians. Savinac, Belgrade, in 1995.
- T.Milosavljević. Endoscopic intervention methods in biliary diseases. In : R. Čolović Surgery of the biliary system, the Institute for textbooks and teaching aids, Belgrade, 1998:369-384.
- T. Milosavljević: Endoscopic diagnostic methods (67-82) Endoscopic interventions in pancreatic disease (287-298), in Colović R. Pancreatic Surgery, Institute for Textbooks and Teaching Aids, Belgrade, in 1998.
- T.Milosavljević. Primary sclerosing cholangitis. In Kostic K, Grbic R: Bile acids in liver and biliary channels. Medical Academy of Serbian Medical Society and the Medical Faculty, University of Belgrade, Belgrade, 1999 :101 - 110th
- T.Milosavljevic, and Jovanovic. Endoscopic diagnosis of diseases associated with increased secretion of HCl (95 -100). In : Nagorno A: Diagnosis and treatment of diseases of the digestive tract associated with increased secretion of hydrochloric acid, Prosveta Nis, Nis, 2005.
- T Milosavljevic, and Jovanovic. Endoscopic therapy of diseases associated with increased secretion of HCl (183-192). In : Nagorno A: Diagnosis and treatment of diseases of the digestive tract associated with increased secretion of hydrochloric acid, Prosveta Nis, Nis, 2005.
- Sokic Milutinovic A, Wex T, Todorovic V, Bjelovic M, Milosavljevic T, Malfertheiner P. Influence of Helicobacter pylori infection on gastrin / somatostatin link. Are there any differences related to the disease outcome. In: BA Levine (Editor): Neuropeptide Research Trends. Nova Science Publishers, 2007 : 65-96.

Political offices
Preceded by Uroš Jovanović (acting); Dragomir Marisavljević (acting); Slobodan Lalović (acting)	Minister of Health of Serbia; 2002–2003; 2004–2006; 2007–2011	Succeeded by Dragomir Marisavljević (acting); Nevena Karanović (acting); Rasim Ljajić (acting)
