= Ministry of Finance (Serbia) =

Government ministry of Serbia

- Министарство финансија Ministarstvo finansija

Ministry overview
- Formed: 11 February 1991; 35 years ago
- Jurisdiction: Government of Serbia
- Headquarters: Kneza Miloša Street 20, Belgrade
- Minister responsible: Siniša Mali
- Website: mfin.gov.rs

The Ministry of Finance (Serbian: Министарство финансија, romanized: Ministarstvo finansija) is a ministry in the Government of Serbia which is in charge of state finances and economy. The current minister is Siniša Mali, in office since 29 May 2018.

== History ==
The new ministry was established in 1991. The Ministry of Industry which existed from 1991 to 2001, was merged into the Ministry of Finance. The Ministry of Economy was established on 3 March 2004 after being split from the Ministry of Finance. In 2012, the Ministry of Finance was merged with the Ministry of Economy under Mlađan Dinkić, only to be split once again in 2013.

== Organization ==
The Ministry is organized into following departments:

- Department for Macroeconomic and Fiscal projections
- Department for Budget
- Department for Budget Inspection
- Department for Fiscal System
- Department for Customs System and Policy
- Department for Financial System
- Department for Central Harmonization
- Department for the European Union Funds Management
- Department for Contracting and Financing of the European Union-funded Programs
- Department for Property and Legal Affairs
- Department for International Cooperation and European Integration
- Department for Capital projects

Besides departments, there are 8 directorates subordinated to the Ministry:

- Treasury Directorate
- Tax Directorate
- Customs Directorate
- Directorate for Public Debt
- Directorate for Prevention of Money Laundering
- Directorate for Tobacco
- Directorate for the Free Economic Zones
- Directorate for Gambling Industry

== List of ministers ==
Political Party: SPS DOS SPO DS G17 Plus URS DSS SNS n-p

No.	Portrait	Minister	Took office	Left office	Time in office	Party	Cabinet
Minister of Finance
1	Jovan Zebić	Jovan Zebić (1939–2007)	11 February 1991	10 February 1993	1 year, 365 days	SPS	Zelenović; Božović
2	Slavoljub Stanić	Slavoljub Stanić	10 February 1993	18 March 1994	1 year, 36 days	SPS	Šainović
3	Dušan Vlatković	Dušan Vlatković (born 1938)	18 March 1994	10 July 1997	3 years, 114 days	SPS	Marjanović I
4	Borislav Milačić	Borislav Milačić (born 1953)	10 July 1997	24 October 2000	3 years, 106 days	SPS	Marjanović I–II
	Borislav Milačić	Borislav Milačić (born 1953); Co-Minister	24 October 2000	25 January 2001	93 days	SPS	Minić
	Ljubiša Jovanović	Ljubiša Jovanović (born 1945); Co-Minister	24 October 2000	25 January 2001	93 days	DOS	Minić
	Bojan Dimitrijević	Bojan Dimitrijević (born 1963); Co-Minister	24 October 2000	25 January 2001	93 days	SPO	Minić
5	Božidar Đelić	Božidar Đelić (born 1965)	25 January 2001	3 March 2004	3 years, 38 days	DS	Đinđić–Živković
6	Mlađan Dinkić	Mlađan Dinkić (born 1964)	3 March 2004	9 November 2006	2 years, 251 days	G17+	Koštunica I
–	Vesna Arsić	Vesna Arsić (born 1955); Acting	9 November 2006	14 November 2006	5 days	G17+	Koštunica I
–	Milan Parivodić	Milan Parivodić (born 1966); Acting	14 November 2006	15 May 2007	182 days	DSS	Koštunica I
7	Mirko Cvetković	Mirko Cvetković (born 1950)	15 May 2007	7 July 2008	1 year, 53 days	Independent	Koštunica II
8	Diana Dragutinović	Diana Dragutinović (born 1958)	7 July 2008	14 March 2011	2 years, 250 days	DS	Cvetković
(7)	Mirko Cvetković	Mirko Cvetković (born 1950)	14 March 2011	27 July 2012	1 year, 135 days	Independent	Cvetković
Minister of Finance and Economy
(6)	Mlađan Dinkić	Mlađan Dinkić (born 1964)	27 July 2012	2 September 2013	1 year, 37 days	URS	Dačić
Minister of Finance
9	Lazar Krstić	Lazar Krstić (born 1984)	2 September 2013	15 July 2014	316 days	Independent	Dačić; Vučić I
–	Dušan Vujović	Dušan Vujović (1951–2025); Acting	15 July 2014	2 August 2014	18 days	Independent	Vučić I
10	Dušan Vujović	Dušan Vujović (1951–2025)	2 August 2014	16 May 2018	3 years, 287 days	Independent	Vučić I–II; Brnabić I
–	Ana Brnabić	Ana Brnabić (born 1975); Acting	16 May 2018	29 May 2018	13 days	Independent	Brnabić I
11	Siniša Mali	Siniša Mali (born 1972)	29 May 2018	Incumbent	8 years, 71 days	SNS	Brnabić I–II–III; Vučević; Macut

== See also ==
- Ministry of Industry (1991–2001)
