= First cabinet of Ana Brnabić =

Period in Serbian politics

Cabinet of Ana Brnabić
- 15th Cabinet of Republic of Serbia
- 2017–2020
- Date formed: 29 June 2017
- Date dissolved: 28 October 2020

People and organisations
- Head of state: Aleksandar Vučić
- Head of government: Ana Brnabić
- Member parties: SNS, SPS, SDPS, PS, PUPS, SNP

History
- Election: 24 April 2016
- Predecessor: Second cabinet of Aleksandar Vučić
- Successor: Second cabinet of Ana Brnabić

The cabinet of the Government of Serbia, led by prime minister Ana Brnabić, was elected on 29 June 2017 by a majority vote in the National Assembly. It succeeded the second cabinet of Aleksandar Vučić, formed after the 2016 parliamentary election, after Vučić resigned the prime minister post following his election as the President of Serbia. Vučić appointed Ana Brnabić, previously the Minister of Public Administration, as his successor on 15 June 2017.

== History ==
The cabinet comprises ministers from the Serbian Progressive Party (SNS), Socialist Party of Serbia (SPS), Social Democratic Party of Serbia (SDPS), Movement of Socialists (PS), Party of United Pensioners of Serbia (PUPS), and Serbian National Party (SNP), as well as some without a party affiliation. It consists mostly of the same ministers from the previous cabinet, with three new members introduced: Branko Ružić (SPS) taking the Brnabić's previous ministry, Goran Trivan (SPS) taking the new post of Minister of Environmental Protection, and Nenad Popović (SNP) a minister without portfolio in charge of innovations. Aleksandar Vulin, formerly the Minister of Labour, and Zoran Đorđević, formerly the Minister of Defence, swapped places. Jadranka Joksimović, formerly a minister without portfolio, assumed the new Ministry of European Integration. The cabinet was approved by 157 votes for and 57 against, out of 250 members of the National Assembly.

On 7 May 2018, Minister of Finance Dušan Vujović resigned from the position for personal reasons. On 28 May 2018, Siniša Mali, at the time Mayor of Belgrade, was appointed as the new Minister of Finance.

== Supporting parties ==
Party	Main ideology	Political position	Leader
Government parties
Serbian Progressive Party (SNS)	Populism	Big tent	Aleksandar Vučić
Socialist Party of Serbia (SPS)	Social democracy	Centre-left	Ivica Dačić
Movement of Socialists (PS)	Left-wing nationalism	Centre-left	Aleksandar Vulin
Party of United Pensioners of Serbia (PUPS)	Pensioners' interests	Centre	Milan Krkobabić
Social Democratic Party of Serbia (SDPS)	Social democracy	Centre-left	Rasim Ljajić
Serbian People's Party (SNP)	National conservatism	Right-wing	Nenad Popović
Confidence and supply
United Serbia (JS)	National conservatism	Right-wing	Dragan Marković
Alliance of Vojvodina Hungarians (VMSZ)	Hungarian minority interests	Centre-right	István Pásztor
Bosniak Democratic Union of Sandžak (BDZS)	Bosniak minority interests	Right-wing	Muamer Zukorlić

== Cabinet members ==
Nominating party: SNS SPS n-p (SNS-nominated) SDPS (SNS-nominated) PS (SNS-nominated) SNP (SNS-nominated) PUPS (SNS-nominated)

Portfolio	Minister	Image	Took office
Prime Minister
General Affairs	Ana Brnabić		29 June 2017
Deputy Prime Ministers
Foreign Affairs	Ivica Dačić		27 April 2014
Construction, Transportation and Infrastructure	Zorana Mihajlović		27 April 2014
Internal Affairs	Nebojša Stefanović		27 April 2014
Trade, Tourism and Telecommunications	Rasim Ljajić		27 July 2012
Ministers
Agriculture, Forestry and Water Economy	Branislav Nedimović		11 August 2016
Culture and Information	Vladan Vukosavljević		11 August 2016
Defence	Aleksandar Vulin		29 June 2017
Economy	Goran Knežević		11 August 2016
Education, Science and Technological Development	Mladen Šarčević		11 August 2016
Environmental Protection	Goran Trivan		29 June 2017
European Integration	Jadranka Joksimović		29 June 2017
Finance	Siniša Mali		29 May 2018
Health	Zlatibor Lončar		27 April 2014
Justice	Nela Kuburović		11 August 2016
Labour, Employment, Veteran and Social Policy	Zoran Đorđević		29 June 2017
Mining and Energy	Aleksandar Antić		27 April 2014
State Administration and Local Self-Government	Branko Ružić		29 June 2017
Youth and Sports	Vanja Udovičić		2 September 2013
Ministers without portfolio
Innovations and Technological Development	Nenad Popović		29 June 2017
Regional Development	Milan Krkobabić		11 August 2016
Violence Prevention and Protection of Children and the Disabled	Slavica Đukić Dejanović		11 August 2016
