= Zoran Gajić =

Serbian volleyball coach and politician

- Зоран Гајић
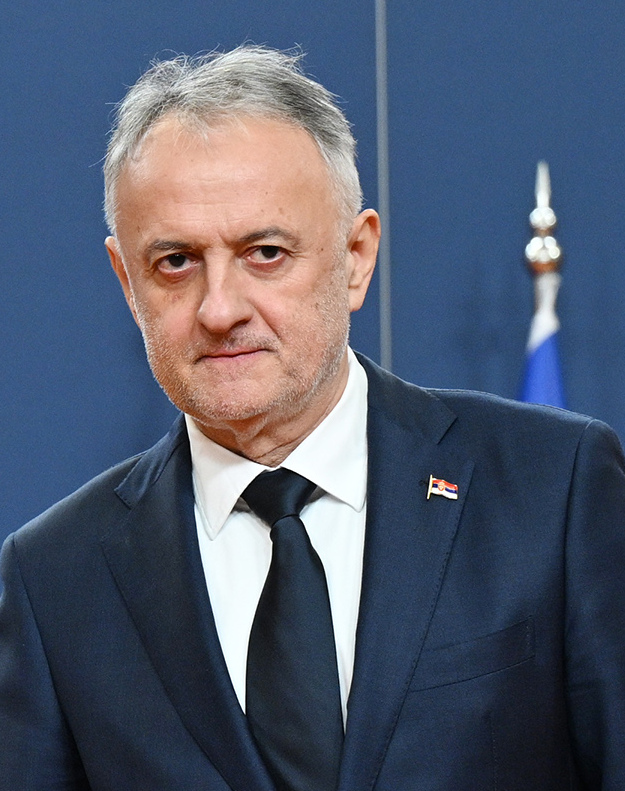
- Gajić in 2026

Minister of Sports
- Incumbent
- Assumed office 26 October 2022
- Prime Minister: Ana Brnabić; Ivica Dačić (acting); Miloš Vučević; Đuro Macut
- Preceded by: Vanja Udovičić

Personal details
- Born: 28 December 1958 (age 67) Pančevo, PR Serbia, FPR Yugoslavia
- Party: Independent
- Occupation: Volleyball coach; politician

Zoran Gajić
Medal record

Men's volleyball

Head Coach for Yugoslavia

Olympic Games
Gold medal – first place	2000 Sydney	Team competition
Bronze medal – third place	1996 Atlanta	Team competition

World Championship
Silver medal – second place	1998 Japan	Team competition

European Championship
Gold medal – first place	2001 Czech Republic	Team competition
Silver medal – second place	1997 Netherlands	Team competition
Bronze medal – third place	1995 Greece	Team competition
Bronze medal – third place	1999 Austria	Team competition

World League
Bronze medal – third place	2002 Brazil	Team competition

Head Coach for Russia

World League
Bronze medal – third place	2006 Russia	Team competition

European Championship
Silver medal – second place	2005 Italy	Team competition

Zoran Gajić (Serbian Cyrillic: Зоран Гајић; born 28 December 1958) is a Serbian volleyball coach and politician serving as minister of sports since 2022. As a volleyball coach, he coached Rabita Baku, and FR Yugoslavia, Iran and Russia men's national volleyball teams.

== Volleyball career ==
From 1980 to 1988, Gajić was the head coach in the Volleyball training camp of the Serbian Province of Vojvodina and the head coach of the junior team of the Province of Vojvodina. From 1980 to 1983, he organised and supervised groups of young players aged 9 to 11.

As the head coach of the Yugoslavia national team, the team claimed nine medals – including an Olympic gold at the Sydney 2000 Games, followed by a European Championship title a year later in Ostrava Czech Republic. Born in Pančevo, his coaching career, he started in OK Mladost from Omoljica, then he coached OK Vojvodina, Aris Thessaloniki, A.C. Orestiada, Olympiacos S.C. Piraeus, A.E.K. Athens, Arçelik, Odintsovo, Ural Ufa.With the national volleyball team of FR Yugoslavia, he won a gold medal at the 2000 Summer Olympics and a bronze medal in 1996 at Atlanta. His other international victories include a silver medal in the 1998 World Championship and a gold medal in the 2001 European Championship. He won 3 more medals at the European Championships. In 2011 with Rabita Baku, for whom played 5 Serbian players won FIVB Women's Club World Championship in Doha, Qatar. He was re-elected president of the Volleyball Federation of Serbia in 2020 at the electoral Assembly of the Volleyball Association of Serbia.

== Political career ==
He has been serving as the minister of sports in the Government of Serbia since 26 October 2022.
