= Cabinet of Mirko Cvetković =

Cabinet

- 11th Cabinet of Republic of Serbia
- 2008–2012
- Date formed: 7 July 2008
- Date dissolved: 27 July 2012

People and organisations
- Head of state: Boris Tadić
- Head of government: Mirko Cvetković
- Member parties: DS; SPS; G17 Plus; SDPS; PUPS; SPO; SDAS

History
- Election: May 11, 2008
- Predecessor: Cabinet of Vojislav Koštunica II
- Successor: Cabinet of Ivica Dačić

The Cvetković Cabinet was elected on 7 July 2008 by a majority vote in the National Assembly. The coalition government was composed of the For a European Serbia alliance, the SPS-PUPS-JS, and ethnic minority parties. The Cabinet was reshuffled on 14 March 2011.

== Supporting parties ==
Party	Main ideology	Political position	Leader
Government parties
Democratic Party (DS)	Social liberalism	Centre to centre-left	Boris Tadić
Socialist Party of Serbia (SPS)	Social democracy	Centre-left	Ivica Dačić
Party of United Pensioners of Serbia (PUPS)	Pensioners' interests	Centre-left	Jovan Krkobabić
Social Democratic Party of Serbia (SDPS)	Social democracy	Centre-left	Rasim Ljajić
G17 Plus (G17+)	Liberalism	Centre to Centre-right	Mlađan Dinkić
Serbian Renewal Movement (SPO)	Liberalism	Centre-right	Vuk Drašković
Party of Democratic Action of Sandžak (SDAS)	Bosniak minority interests	Centre-right	Sulejman Ugljanin
Confidence and supply
League of Social Democrats of Vojvodina (LSV)	Vojvodina autonomism	Centre-left	Nenad Čanak
United Serbia (JS)	National conservatism	Right-wing	Dragan Marković
Alliance of Vojvodina Hungarians (VMSZ)	Hungarian minority interests	Centre-right	István Pásztor

== 2008–2011 ==
Office	Incumbent	Image	Since	Party
Prime Minister	Mirko Cvetković		2008	Independent (DS endorsed)
Deputy Prime Minister and Minister of Internal Affairs	Ivica Dačić		2008	SPS
Deputy Prime Minister	Jovan Krkobabić		2008	PUPS
Minister of Foreign Affairs	Vuk Jeremić		2008	DS
Minister of Defence	Dragan Šutanovac		2008	DS
Minister of Finance	Diana Dragutinović		2008	DS
Minister of Justice	Snežana Malović		2008	DS
Minister of Agriculture, Forestry and Water Management	Saša Dragin		2008	DS
Minister of Economy and Regional Development	Mlađan Dinkić		2008	G17+
Minister of Infrastructure	Milutin Mrkonjić		2008	SPS
Minister of Public Administration and Local Self-Government	Milan Marković		2008	DS
Minister of Trade and Services	Slobodan Milosavljević		2008	DS
Minister of Human and Minority Rights	Svetozar Čiplić		2008	DS
Minister of National Investment	Verica Kalanović		2008	G17+
Ministry of Science and Technological Development	Božidar Đelić		2008	DS
Minister of Education	Žarko Obradović		2008	SPS
Minister of Health	Tomica Milosavljević		2008	G17+
Minister of Labour and Social Policy	Rasim Ljajić		2008	SDPS
Minister of Environment and Spatial Planning	Oliver Dulić		2008	DS
Minister of Energy and Mining	Petar Škundrić		2008	SPS
Minister of Telecommunications and Information Society	Jasna Matić		2008	G17+
Minister for Kosovo and Metohija	Goran Bogdanović		2008	DS
Minister of Culture	Nebojša Bradić		2008	G17+
Minister of Youth and Sports	Snežana Samardžić-Marković		2008	G17+
Minister of Religion	Bogoljub Šijaković		2008	DS
Minister of Diaspora	Srđan Srećković		2008	SPO
Minister without Portfolio	Sulejman Ugljanin		2008	SDA

== 2011–2012 Cabinet reshuffle ==
Office	Incumbent	Image	Since	Party
Prime Minister and Minister of Finance	Mirko Cvetković		2008	Independent (DS endorsed)
Deputy Prime Minister and Minister of Internal Affairs	Ivica Dačić		2008	SPS
Deputy Prime Minister	Jovan Krkobabić		2008	PUPS
Deputy Prime Minister charged for Economy	Verica Kalanović		2008	G17+
Minister of Foreign Affairs	Vuk Jeremić		2008	DS
Minister of Defence	Dragan Šutanovac		2008	DS
Minister of Justice	Snežana Malović		2008	DS
Minister of Agriculture, Trade, Forestry and Water Management	Dušan Petrović		2011	DS
Minister of Economy and Regional Development	Nebojša Ćirić		2011	G17+
Minister of Infrastructure and Energy	Milutin Mrkonjić		2008	SPS
Minister of Human and Minority Rights, Public Administration and Local Self-Government	Milan Marković		2008	DS
Minister of Education and Science	Žarko Obradović		2008	SPS
Minister of Health	Zoran Stanković		2011	Independent (G17+ endorsed)
Minister of Labour and Social Policy	Rasim Ljajić		2008	SDPS
Minister of Environment, Mining and Spatial Planning	Oliver Dulić		2008	DS
Minister of Culture, Media and Information Society	Predrag Marković		2011	G17+
Minister for Kosovo-Metohija	Goran Bogdanović		2008	DS
Minister of Religion and Diaspora	Srđan Srećković		2008	SPO
Minister without Portfolio	Sulejman Ugljanin		2008	SDA

== See also ==
- Cabinet of Serbia (2000–01)
- Cabinet of Serbia (2001–04)
- Cabinet of Serbia (2004–07)
- Cabinet of Serbia (2007–08)
- Cabinet of Serbia (2012–14)
- Cabinet of Serbia
