= Zlatibor Lončar =

Serbian doctor and politician

- Златибор Лончар
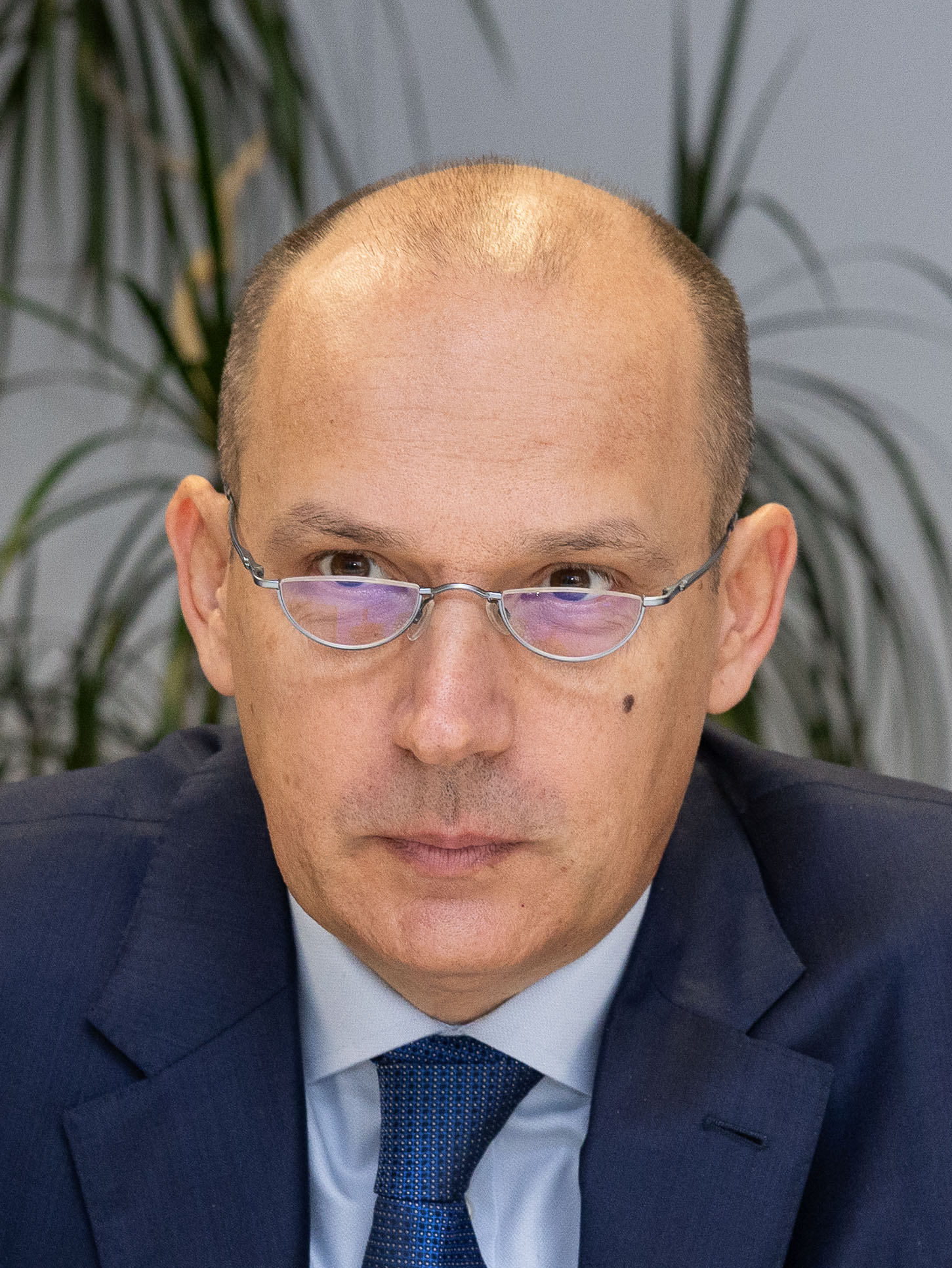
- Lončar in 2025

Minister of Health
- Incumbent
- Assumed office 2 May 2024
- Prime Minister: Miloš Vučević; Đuro Macut
- Preceded by: Danica Grujičić
- In office 27 April 2014 – 26 October 2022
- Prime Minister: Aleksandar Vučić; Ivica Dačić (acting); Ana Brnabić
- Preceded by: Slavica Đukić Dejanović
- Succeeded by: Danica Grujičić

Personal details
- Born: 3 August 1971 (age 55) Belgrade, SR Serbia, SFR Yugoslavia
- Party: SNS
- Spouse: Vesna Lončar
- Children: 1
- Education: University of Belgrade
- Occupation: Doctor; politician

Zlatibor Lončar (Serbian Cyrillic: Златибор Лончар; born 3 August 1971) is a Serbian doctor and politician serving as minister of health since 2024, previously serving that role from 2014 to 2022.

== Education and career ==
Lončar finished primary and secondary school in Belgrade, and later enrolled at the Faculty of Medicine, University of Belgrade, which he finished in 1997. In 1998, he started the specialization of general surgery and finished in 2003. In 2008, he enrolled in a PhD in Medical Epidemiology.

From 2012, he served as a director of the Emergency Center within the Clinical Centre of Serbia and from 2013 as the head of Transplantation department.

== Minister of Health ==
On April 27, 2014, following the 2014 Serbian parliamentary election he was appointed as the minister of Health in the first cabinet of Aleksandar Vučić. His appointment was heavily criticized, among others by group of doctors at the Clinical Centre of Serbia, due to the "lack of professional skills", unexplained origin of wealth and criminal connections. After the 2016 Serbian parliamentary election, he remained as part of the second cabinet of Aleksandar Vučić.

In February 2017, the Prime Minister of Serbia Aleksandar Vučić decided to run for the 2017 Serbian presidential elections. He won the elections in the first round and was sworn as the President of Serbia on 31 May 2017. Weeks later, he gave mandate to Ana Brnabić to form the governmental cabinet. On 29 June 2017, the cabinet of Ana Brnabić was formed, with Lončar keeping his office.

== Accusations of criminal connections ==
According to the 2004 testimony of the cooperative witness Dejan Milenković Bagzi (who was an important member of the Zemun Clan) in the Zoran Đinđić trial, in Serbian Special Court for Organised Crime: on 5 September 2002, Belgrade-based Rakovica Clan tried to eliminate the Montenegrin criminal Veselin Božović Vesko, but he survived the assassination and was transferred to the Clinical Centre of Serbia in which at that time worked Lončar. Allegedly, he had good chances to survive and his condition was stable. According to Milenković, head of the criminal group Dušan Spasojević who also had interest of Božović's death, asked one of his insider doctors Risović to finish him in the hospital, but he was having second thoughts. Later, allegedly, another Spasojević's insider doctor, Lončar confessed to Spasojević that he gave him lethal injection and Božović died shortly after, on 7 September 2002. For the reward, Spasojević gave him apartment in New Belgrade. Officially, ten days after Božović's death, Lončar bought the apartment from the wife of Zemun Clan hitman Sretko Kalinić for 30,000 euros only to re-sell it months later. Miladin Suvajdžić, another cooperative witness and former important member of the Zemun Clan, in his 2006 testimony confirmed the story of Milenković; one of the main roles of Suvajdžić was to buy properties, vehicles for various of reasons. At the time of testimonies, Lončar denied these allegations and was never prosecuted.

In 2005, convicted Zemun Clan member Milomir Kaličanin testified that many police officers, footballers and doctors Lončar and Risović often came to Zemun Clan headquarters.

In January 2017, following the political battle with former ally Prime Minister Aleksandar Vučić and alleged assassination attempt, Serbian politician Velimir Ilić showed media several photos of Lončar and notorious Zemun Clan now deceased head Dušan Spasojević, along with other criminal members and footballers Dragoljub Jeremić and Danko Lazović who were interrogated during the Operation Sabre. The photos were taken in period prior to the Zemun Clan assassination of Zoran Đinđić, while Lončar was studying for specialization thesis in general surgery.

Serbian Prime Minister Vučić backed minister saying that Lončar told him that: "the photo was taken after Lončar completed surgery on Spasojević's father and later called him to a nearby café to thank him". Ilić replied saying that the specialization students cannot operate surgeries.

== Personal life ==
He is married to Vesna Lončar with whom he has a daughter. According to the Serbian tabloid Alo!, the other male infant twin died after the birth; for the release of private information to the public, Lončar sued the tabloid and then Alo! apologized to his family. According to one group of doctors at the Clinical Centre of Serbia, Lončar has paid 3,000 euros daily over 60 days for the treatment of newborn daughter in Vienna.

His wife Vesna is a lawyer and has also served as a chairman of the supervisory board of Pošta Srbije. She has represented many Serbian criminals and suspicious figures close to the Serbian political leadership, including drug lord Darko Šarić close associates, Sreten Jocić, Predrag Mali, brother of the Mayor of Belgrade Siniša Mali and even close family members of the Serbian Prime Minister Aleksandar Vučić – brother Andrej Vučić and general director of Elektromreža Srbije Nikola Petrović.

Political offices
Preceded by Slavica Đukić Dejanović	Minister of Health of Serbia; 2014–2022	Succeeded by Danica Grujičić
Preceded by Danica Grujičić	Minister of Health of Serbia; 2024–	Incumbent
