= Second cabinet of Aleksandar Vučić =

- 14th Cabinet of Republic of Serbia
- 2016–2017
- Date formed: 11 August 2016
- Date dissolved: 29 June 2017

People and organisations
- Head of state: Tomislav Nikolić; Aleksandar Vučić
- Head of government: Aleksandar Vučić; Ivica Dačić (Acting)
- Member parties: SNS, SPS, SDPS, PS, PUPS

History
- Election: 24 April 2016
- Predecessor: First cabinet of Aleksandar Vučić
- Successor: First cabinet of Ana Brnabić

The Government of Serbia, the second one led by prime minister Aleksandar Vučić, was elected on 11 August 2016 by a majority vote in the National Assembly. Parliamentary election was held on 24 April 2016, and the ruling coalition of the Serbian Progressive Party and the Socialist Party of Serbia, running in separate lists, won the total of 160 out of 250 seats and retained its parliamentary majority. While the Vučić's Progressive party again won enough seats to form the government alone, he decided to continue cooperation with the Socialists.

The cabinet comprises ministers from the Serbian Progressive Party (SNS), Socialist Party of Serbia (SPS), Social Democratic Party of Serbia (SDPS), Movement of Socialists (PS) and Party of United Pensioners of Serbia (PUPS), as well as some without a party affiliation. Apart from the prime minister, the cabinet has 19 members: 16 with a ministry and 3 without portfolio. Eleven of them served in the previous cabinet and eight are new.

On 30 May 2017 Vučić resigned the post of prime minister, having been elected as the President of Serbia on the April 2017 elections. First Deputy Ivica Dačić assumed the post of acting prime minister. The new cabinet under prime minister Ana Brnabić, with a similar composition of ministers, was voted on 29 June.

== Supporting parties ==
Party	Main ideology	Political position	Leader
Government parties
Serbian Progressive Party (SNS)	Populism	Big tent	Aleksandar Vučić
Socialist Party of Serbia (SPS)	Social democracy	Centre-left	Ivica Dačić
Movement of Socialists (PS)	Left-wing nationalism	Centre-left	Aleksandar Vulin
Party of United Pensioners of Serbia (PUPS)	Pensioners' interests	Centre	Milan Krkobabić
Social Democratic Party of Serbia (SDPS)	Social democracy	Centre-left	Rasim Ljajić
Confidence and supply
United Serbia (JS)	National conservatism	Right-wing	Dragan Marković
Alliance of Vojvodina Hungarians (VMSZ)	Hungarian minority interests	Centre-right	István Pásztor
Bosniak Democratic Union of Sandžak (BDZS)	Bosniak minority interests	Right-wing	Jahja Fehratović

== Cabinet members ==
Position	Incumbent	Image	Since	Party
Prime Minister	Aleksandar Vučić		27 April 2014 – 30 May 2017	SNS
Prime Minister (acting)	Ivica Dačić		30 May 2017	SPS
First Deputy Prime Minister (formerly) and Minister of Foreign Affairs	Ivica Dačić		27 April 2014	SPS
Deputy Prime Minister and Minister of Construction, Transportation and Infrastructure	Zorana Mihajlović		27 April 2014	SNS
Deputy Prime Minister and Minister of Trade, Tourism and Telecommunications	Rasim Ljajić		27 April 2014	SDPS (SNS-nominated)
Deputy Prime Minister and Minister of Internal Affairs	Nebojša Stefanović		27 April 2014; DPM since11 August 2016	SNS
Minister of State Administration and Local Self-Government	Ana Brnabić		11 August 2016	Nonpartisan (SNS-nominated)
Minister of Finance	Dušan Vujović		15 July 2014	Nonpartisan (SNS-nominated)
Minister of Economy	Goran Knežević		11 August 2016	SNS
Minister of Agriculture and Environmental Protection	Branislav Nedimović		11 August 2016	SNS
Minister of Energy and Mining	Aleksandar Antić		27 April 2014	SPS
Minister of Justice	Nela Kuburović		11 August 2016	SNS
Minister of Defence	Zoran Đorđević		2 March 2016	SNS
Minister of Education, Science, and Technological Development	Mladen Šarčević		11 August 2016	Nonpartisan (SNS-nominated)
Minister of Health	Zlatibor Lončar		27 April 2014	SNS
Minister of Labour, Employment, Veteran and Social Policy	Aleksandar Vulin		27 April 2014	PS (SNS-nominated)
Minister of Youth and Sports	Vanja Udovičić		2 September 2013	SNS
Minister of Culture and Information	Vladan Vukosavljević		11 August 2016	Nonpartisan (SNS-nominated)
Minister without portfolio in charge of European Integration	Jadranka Joksimović		27 April 2014	SNS
Minister without portfolio in charge of Violence Prevention and Protection of Children and the Disabled	Slavica Đukić Dejanović		11 August 2016	SPS
Minister without portfolio in charge of Regional Development	Milan Krkobabić		11 August 2016	PUPS (SNS-nominated)
