= Aleksandar Vulin =

Serbian politician and lawyer

- Александар Вулин
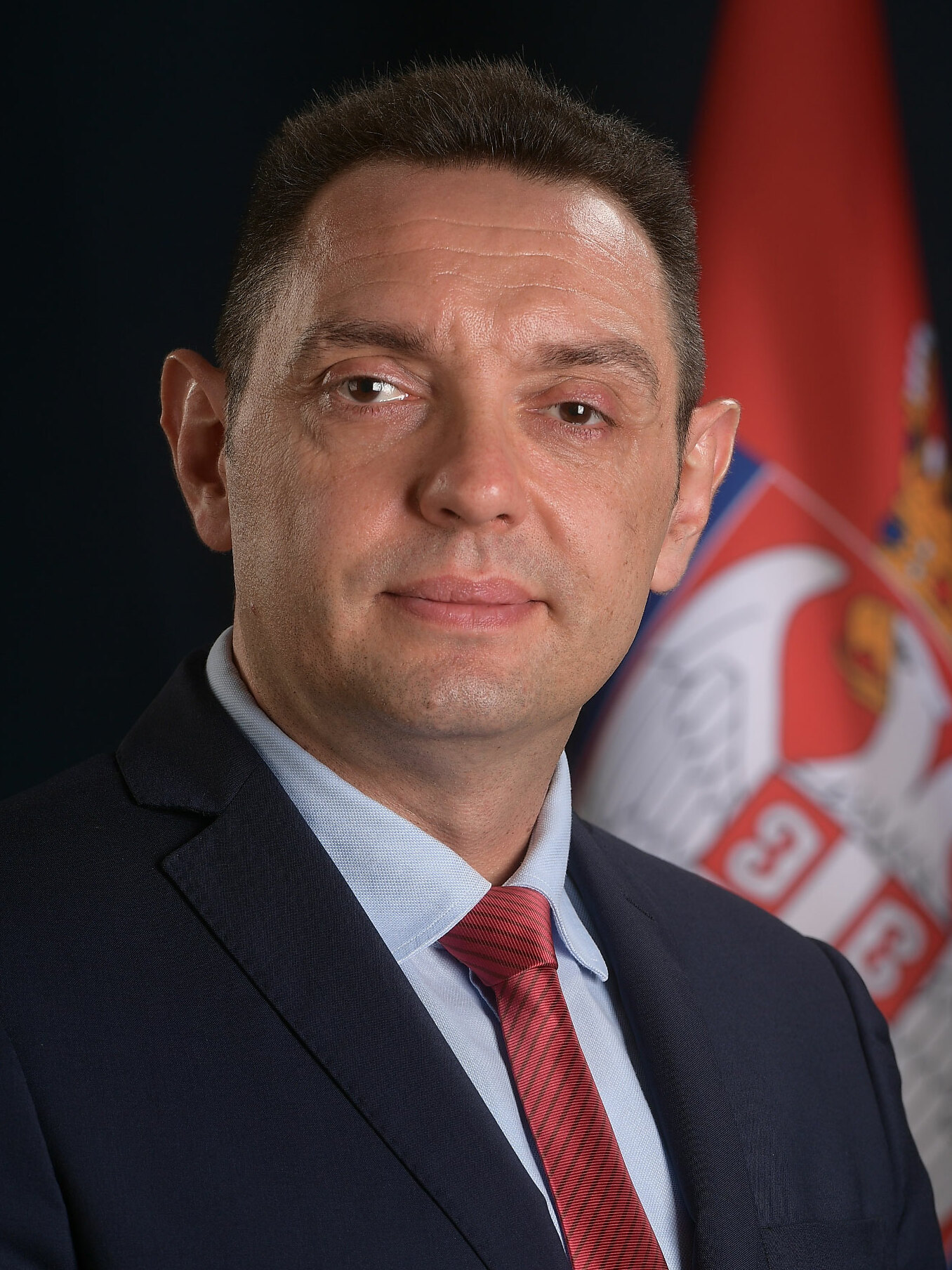
- Official portrait, 2019

Deputy Prime Minister of Serbia
- In office 2 May 2024 – 16 April 2025
- Prime Minister: Miloš Vučević

Director of the Security Intelligence Agency
- In office 1 December 2022 – 3 November 2023
- Prime Minister: Ana Brnabić
- Preceded by: Bratislav Gašić
- Succeeded by: Tomislav Radovanović (acting), later Vladimir Orlić

Minister of Internal Affairs
- In office 28 October 2020 – 26 October 2022
- Prime Minister: Ana Brnabić
- Preceded by: Nebojša Stefanović
- Succeeded by: Bratislav Gašić

Minister of Defence
- In office 29 June 2017 – 28 October 2020
- Prime Minister: Ana Brnabić
- Preceded by: Zoran Đorđević
- Succeeded by: Nebojsa Stefanovic

Minister of Labour, Employment, Veteran and Social Policy
- In office 27 April 2014 – 29 June 2017
- Prime Minister: Aleksandar Vučić; Ivica Dačić (acting)
- Preceded by: Jovan Krkobabić
- Succeeded by: Zoran Đorđević

Minister without portfolio in charge of Kosovo and Metohija
- In office 2 September 2013 – 27 April 2014
- Prime Minister: Ivica Dačić

Director of the Office for Kosovo and Metohija
- In office 27 July 2012 – 2 September 2013
- Preceded by: Post established
- Succeeded by: Marko Đurić

Personal details
- Born: 2 October 1972 (age 54) Novi Sad, SR Serbia, SFR Yugoslavia
- Party: SK–PJ (1990–1994); JUL (1994–1998); DLP (2000–2002); SPS (2002–2006); PS (2008–present)
- Education: University of Kragujevac
- Occupation: Politician
- Profession: Lawyer
- Awards

Aleksandar Vulin (Note: Serbian Cyrillic: Александар Вулин) (born 2 October 1972) is a Serbian politician and lawyer who served as Deputy Prime Minister of Serbia from 2024 to 2025. He served as the director of the Security Intelligence Agency (BIA) from 1 December 2022 until 3 November 2023. Additionally, he previously served as director of the Office for Kosovo and Metohija from 2012 to 2013, minister without portfolio in charge of Kosovo and Metohija from 2013 to 2014, minister of labour, employment, veteran and social policy from 2014 to 2017, minister of defence from 2017 to 2020, and as minister of internal affairs from 2020 to 2022. He has been called "man of Moscow".

Vulin is the founder and former president of the Movement of Socialists (PS), a political party he headed from 2008 to 2022. Vulin was a deputy of Mirjana Marković, the wife of Slobodan Milošević, and served as a high-ranking member of League of Communists – Movement for Yugoslavia (SK–PJ) and Yugoslav Left (JUL) parties, while in the 2000s, he was a member of the Socialist Party of Serbia (SPS) before forming PS.

== Early years ==
He was born in Novi Sad, to Bosnian Serb parents. He finished primary school in Novi Sad, grammar school in Sremski Karlovci and later graduated from the University of Kragujevac Faculty of Law. He stated that ever since his childhood "he has always been a communist". Vulin began his political career during his high school days in Novi Sad by supporting the anti-bureaucratic revolution led by Slobodan Milošević between 1986 and 1989.

== Political career ==
During the collapse of the communist Yugoslavia in 1990, Vulin joined the League of Communists – Movement for Yugoslavia, the so-called "army party" led by general Stevan Mirković. Vulin became a general secretary. In 1994, he was one of the founders of the Yugoslav Left, a party led by Mirjana Marković, the wife of Slobodan Milošević. In the new party, Vulin became a leader of the Revolutionary Youth, the party's youth organisation. He left the Yugoslav Left when it joined with the Milošević's Socialist Party to the coalition with the Vojislav Šešelj's Serbian Radical Party in 1998.

Later he founded the Democratic Left, and then the Movement of Socialists in August 2008.

In 2012, following the 2012 Serbian parliamentary election after which Serbian Progressive Party-led coalition took power, which consisted of Vulin's Movement of Socialists, Vulin was named the director of newly established Office for Kosovo and Metohija. He stayed in the position until 2 September 2013 when he became the Minister without portfolio in charge of Kosovo and Metohija.

Following the 2014 Serbian parliamentary election, leader of the Serbian Progressive Party Aleksandar Vučić formed the government on 27 April 2014 with Vulin being named the Minister of Labour, Employment, Veteran and Social Policy. He kept the office after the 2016 Serbian parliamentary election, in the second cabinet of Aleksandar Vučić.

During his time in the office as Minister of Labour, Employment, Veteran and Social Policy, he was known for his often and fierce criticism directed towards Croatia, as well as occasional insulting of Croatian politicians and officials. On April 21, 2018, Vulin was proclaimed persona non grata in the Republic of Croatia after saying: "only the Supreme Commander of the Serbian Army – Aleksandar Vučić – can decide about me entering in Croatia, not Croatian ministers."

In June 2017, Aleksandar Vučić gave mandate to Ana Brnabić to form the governmental cabinet. On 29 June 2017, the cabinet of Ana Brnabić was formed, with Vulin swapping minister positions with Zoran Đorđević to become the Minister of Defence.

In 2020, he was awarded Order of the Flag of Republika Srpska.

In June 2021, Vulin spoke positive of Serbian irredentist idea of Greater Serbia by saying: "Greater Serbia never happened, otherwise we [the Serbs] would know where we live and which ethnic spaces belong to us".

In August 2022, Vulin visited Moscow and told Russian foreign minister Sergey Lavrov, "Serbia is the only state in Europe that didn’t introduce sanctions and was not part of the anti-Russian hysteria."

=== Sanctions and resignation ===
On 11 July 2023, the US Department of the Treasury sanctioned Vulin, accusing him of "corrupt and destabilizing acts that have also facilitated Russia's malign activities in the region", including "support for a drug trafficking network and support for illegal arms shipments involving Slobodan Tešić and the Belarus firm Beltechexport (Belarusian: «Белтэхэкспарт»)". (Note: Slobodan Tešić (Serbian: Слободан Тешић; born 21 December 1958, Kiseljak, Bosnia and Herzegovina) was blacklisted by the United Nations from 2003 until 2013 for his illegal arms trading of supposedly Nigeria bound weapons shipments through his firm Temex that violated international sanctions and went instead to Liberia which became known as the Orao Affair. In 2009, he allegedly attempted to supply Muammar el Gaddafi with $50 million worth of Zastava weapons and Sloboda missiles through his firm Melvale. According to United Nations experts, Tesic allegedly sent 3,000 tonnes of Belarusian ammunition as well as Serbian small arms, light weapons and machine guns to Libya from 2013 to the summer of 2014 which, beginning in April 2014, supported not the Libyan army but Khaled Al Sharif and his support for an "autonomous armed group" that later led to a civil war between Sharif and his support for the Tripoli based Islamist regime against the internationally recognised government in Tobruk. He is also the owner of the firm Vektura trans which allegedly supported arms shipments, including Krušiko mines and grenades, during July 2020 from Serbia to Armenia which were used in its conflict with Azerbaijan in the autumn of 2020. He owns two Serbian companies, Partizan Tech and Technoglobal Systems DOO Beograd, and two Cyprus-based companies, the 2010 founded Limasoll based Grawit Limited and the 2012 founded Limassol based Charso Limited which were allegedly linked to funding for politicians and the Serbian Progressive Party. He is under United States sanctions since 17 December 2017 and United Kingdom sanctions since 9 December 2022.) On 3 November 2023, Vulin resigned from his position in the BIA, saying that he wanted to avoid possible further embargoes against Serbia. On 27 December, Milorad Dodik appointed him as member of the consultative Senate of Republika Srpska.

On 30 January 2024, Vulin was awarded the Order of Friendship by Russian president Vladimir Putin. He received the award at the headquarters of the Russian Foreign Intelligence Service (SVR) in Moscow, in a ceremony conducted by SVR chief Sergei Naryshkin, who cited Vulin's "continuous efforts to comprehensively develop Russian-Serbian relations and cooperation between the Russian and Serbian special services".

=== Return to government ===
On 30 April 2024, Vulin was named as one of several deputy prime ministers in the incoming government of Miloš Vučević. In June, Vulin visited Moscow. During the visit, he laid a wreath on the grave of Joseph Stalin.

== Works ==
- Polit art - politika i kako je prepoznati, M & C, Belgrade (2002) ISBN 86-903275-0-9
- Opadanje, Izdavački grafički atelje M, Belgrade (2004) ISBN 86-83927-10-5
- Lepota, Stylos art, Novi Sad (2008) ISBN 978-86-7473-442-1
- Mrak, IGAM, Belgrade (2010) ISBN 978-86-83927-56-2

== Notes ==
Government offices
Preceded by Bratislav Gašić	Director of the Security Intelligence Agency; 2022–2023	Succeeded by Tomislav Radovanović (acting), later Vladimir Orlić
Political offices
New title	Director of the Office for Kosovo and Metohija; 2012–2013	Succeeded by Marko Đurić
New title	Minister without portfolio in charge of Kosovo and Metohija; 2013–2014	Position abolished
Preceded by Jovan Krkobabić	Minister of Labour, Employment, Veteran and Social Policy; 2014–2017	Succeeded by Zoran Đorđević
Preceded by Zoran Đorđević	Minister of Defence of Serbia; 2017–2020	Succeeded by Nebojša Stefanović
Preceded by Nebojša Stefanović	Minister of the Interior; 2020–2022	Succeeded by Bratislav Gašić
Preceded by Miloš Vučević	Deputy Prime Minister; 2024–present	Incumbent
Party political offices
New title	Leader of the Movement of Socialists; 2008–2022	Succeeded by Bojan Torbica
