= Nevena Karanović =

Serbian cardiologist and politician

Dr Nevena Karanović (Serbian Cyrillic: Невена Карановић) is a Serbian cardiologist and politician.

Dr. Karanović studied at the University of Niš, gaining a master's degree (1997) and a Ph.D. (2001) in cardiology. She was working as a cardiologist at the Clinic of Cardiovascular Diseases of the Clinical Center Niš, from 1988 to 2004. She was one of the founders of the G17 Plus political party., and became a member of the Parliament of Serbia Serbian Government. after the elections in December 2003. Dr. Karanović was Assistant Minister in the Ministry of Health from March to October 2004 and has since been Deputy Minister/State Secretary in the same ministry. She has gained the professional experience in the health sector working as a Medical doctor at Clinical Centre Nis (1988-2004), Assistant to the Minister of Health (2004), State Secretary and Deputy Minister in the Ministry of Health (2004-2011) and Docent and Associate Professor in Health Care Management at Faculty for Business Studies (2007 – 2015). In the Ministry of Health she was working on health policy development through the programming, prioritizing, and implementing of projects funded by EU, World Bank, and national funds with an overall aim to align the Serbian health sector policies with the international best practices; liaison with the Sector for International Cooperation and EU integrations within the Ministry of Health in order to gather and integrate EU best practices in development of new health policies and coordinating South East Europe Health Network (SEEHN) projects. Dr Karanovic was the chief of the Serbian delegation on The First Ministerial Conference on Non-communicable Diseases and Healthy Lifestyles, Moscow, Russia (WHO) (Apr 2011) and the member of the Serbian delegation in official visits to Slovenia (2004), Hungary (2006), Cuba (2009), Albania (2010) and Japan (2010)

Dr. Karanović has also worked as an assistant professor (Nov 2007 to Sep 2011) and the associated professor (Sep 2011 to Jul 2015) in the Megatrend University in Belgrade. During her professional career, she has published over 200 scientific and professional papers from the field of cardiology, health management, HR Management and CSR for health. In 2015, she gained a Ph.D. in the economy, in the field of health management. From January 2010, she gained the Research associate degree at the Institute for the Medical Research Belgrade. Dr. Karanović is one of the five The 11 January Award winners, the highest award of the City Government of Niš "as a member of the team which contributed in establishing the Cardiac Surgery in the Clinical Centre Niš " (11 Jan 2011). She is working as a doctor at the Institut for the rehabilitation in Belgrade.
