= First cabinet of Aleksandar Vučić =

- 13th Cabinet of Republic of Serbia
- 2014–2016
- Date formed: 27 April 2014
- Date dissolved: 11 August 2016

People and organisations
- Head of state: Tomislav Nikolić
- Head of government: Aleksandar Vučić
- Member parties: SNS, SPS, SDPS, PS, NS

History
- Election: 16 March 2014
- Predecessor: Cabinet of Ivica Dačić
- Successor: Second cabinet of Aleksandar Vučić

The cabinet of the Government of Serbia, led by prime minister Aleksandar Vučić, was elected on 27 April 2014 by a majority vote in the National Assembly. It comprised ministers from the Serbian Progressive Party, Socialist Party of Serbia, Social Democratic Party of Serbia, Movement of Socialists and New Serbia, as well as some independent ministers. The cabinet was voted in on April 28, 2014.

On 17 January 2016 Vučić called for a snap election claiming Serbia "needs four more years of stability so that it is ready to join the European Union". The National Assembly was dissolved on 3 March, thus turning the cabinet into a caretaker government.

Parliamentary election was held on 24 April 2016, and Vučić's Serbian Progressive Party-led coalition retained its majority, winning 131 of the 250 seats. Vučić announced the new cabinet on 8 August, consisting of eight old and eight new ministers, retaining the coalition with the Socialist Party. The new government was approved by the National Assembly on August 10.

== Supporting parties ==
Party	Main ideology	Political position	Leader
Government parties
Serbian Progressive Party (SNS)	Populism	Big tent	Aleksandar Vučić
Socialist Party of Serbia (SPS)	Social democracy	Centre-left	Ivica Dačić
Movement of Socialists (PS)	Left-wing nationalism	Centre-left	Aleksandar Vulin
Social Democratic Party of Serbia (SDPS)	Social democracy	Centre-left	Rasim Ljajić
New Serbia (NS)	Conservatism	Right-wing	Velimir Ilić
Confidence and supply
Party of United Pensioners of Serbia (PUPS)	Pensioners' interests	Centre	Jovan Krkobabić
United Serbia (JS)	National conservatism	Right-wing	Dragan Marković
Alliance of Vojvodina Hungarians (VMSZ)	Hungarian minority interests	Centre-right	István Pásztor
Party for Democratic Action (PVD)	Albanian minority interests	Centre-right	Riza Halimi

== Cabinet members ==
Position	Portfolio	Name	Image	In Office	Party
Prime Minister	General Affairs	Aleksandar Vučić		27 April 2014 - 11 August 2016	SNS
First Deputy Prime Minister	General Affairs	Ivica Dačić		27 April 2014 - 11 August 2016	SPS
Minister	Foreign Affairs	Ivica Dačić		27 April 2014 - 11 August 2016	SPS
Deputy Prime Minister	General Affairs	Zorana Mihajlović		27 April 2014 - 11 August 2016	SNS
Minister	Transportation, Construction, and Infrastructure	Zorana Mihajlović		27 April 2014 - 11 August 2016	SNS
Deputy Prime Minister	General Affairs	Rasim Ljajić		27 April 2014 - 11 August 2016	SDPS
Minister	Trade, Telecommunications, and Tourism	Rasim Ljajić		27 April 2014 - 11 August 2016	SDPS
Deputy Prime Minister	General Affairs	Kori Udovički		27 April 2014 - 11 August 2016	None
Minister	State Administration and Local Self-Government	Kori Udovički		27 April 2014 - 11 August 2016	None
Minister	Finance	Lazar Krstić		27 April 2014 - 15 July 2014	None
Minister	Finance	Dušan Vujović		15 July 2014 - 11 August 2016	None
Minister	Economy	Dušan Vujović		27 April 2014 - 3 September 2014	None
Minister	Economy	Željko Sertić		3 September 2014 - 11 August 2016	None
Minister	Agriculture and Environmental Protection	Snežana Bogosavljević Bošković		27 April 2014 - 11 August 2016	SPS
Minister	Energy and Mining	Aleksandar Antić		27 April 2014 - 11 August 2016	SPS
Minister	Justice	Nikola Selaković		27 April 2014 - 11 August 2016	SNS
Minister	Internal Affairs	Nebojša Stefanović		27 April 2014 - 11 August 2016	SNS
Minister	Defence	Bratislav Gašić		27 April 2014 - 05 February 2016	SNS
Minister	Defence	Zoran Đorđević		2 March 2016 - 11 August 2016	SNS
Minister	Education and Science	Srđan Verbić		27 April 2014 - 11 August 2016	None
Minister	Health	Zlatibor Lončar		27 April 2014 - 11 August 2016	SNS
Minister	Labour, Employment, Veteran and Social Policy	Aleksandar Vulin		27 April 2014 - 11 August 2016	PS
Minister	Youth and Sports	Vanja Udovičić		27 April 2014 - 11 August 2016	SNS
Minister	Culture and Information	Ivan Tasovac		27 April 2014 - 11 August 2016	None
Minister without portfolio	European Integration	Jadranka Joksimović		27 April 2014 - 11 August 2016	SNS
Minister without portfolio	Emergency Situations	Velimir Ilić		27 April 2014 - 11 August 2016	NS

== See also ==
- Cabinet of Ivica Dačić
- List of prime ministers of Serbia
- Cabinet of Serbia
