= Mirko Marjanović =

Prime Minister of Serbia from 1994 to 2000

- Мирко Марјановић
- Marjanović in 2000

Prime Minister of Serbia
- In office 18 March 1994 – 21 October 2000
- President: Slobodan Milošević; Milan Milutinović
- Preceded by: Nikola Šainović
- Succeeded by: Milomir Minić

Personal details
- Born: 27 July 1937 Knin, Littoral Banovina, Kingdom of Yugoslavia (modern-day Croatia)
- Died: 21 February 2006 (aged 68) Belgrade, Serbia and Montenegro
- Party: SPS (1990—2006); SKJ (before 1990)

Mirko Marjanović (Note: Serbian Cyrillic: Мирко Марјановић, pronounced [mǐːrko marjǎːnoʋit͡ɕ]) (27 July 1937 – 21 February 2006) was a Serbian politician who served as the prime minister of Serbia from 1994 to 2000.

== Biography ==
Marjanović was born on 27 July 1937 in Knin into a large working-class family with 7 children, where he finished gymnasium. He had four brothers and 2 sisters and his father Dušan worked in a local factory, while his mother Marija was a homemaker.

During the season of 1955/56 he played as a winger for the football club HNK Dinara that is based in Knin. Marjanović later then moved to Zagreb where he attended musical academy which he ended up not finishing because he moved to live in Belgrade.

In 1960, he graduated at University of Belgrade's Faculty of Economics, more specifically at the department for microeconomics. Upon graduation, Marjanović came back to Knin since he found employment there as the supervisor in the Tvik factory. From there, he advanced to the position of financial director, and eventually moving on to a metallurgical factory in Zenica.

In 1973, he transferred to the Moscow outpost of Progres. By 1976, he quickly advanced up the ranks to become one of the directors at Progres. He handled the company's steel division in Russia quite successfully while developing an impressive network of influential friends and business partners such as Viktor Chernomyrdin (later to become Prime Minister of Russia), and Yuri Brezhnev, son of Leonid Brezhnev. Later in 1979, he was named as Progres' general director, a role he would hold until his death. From 1989 until 1994, he was the president of FK Partizan's executive board. One of his more notable moves while at the post was bringing Predrag Mijatović to the club in December 1989. Mijatović, at the time a young promising player from Titograd's FK Budućnost, was very close to signing with Hajduk Split when Marjanović stepped in and convinced him to come to Belgrade. Upon leaving the club, Marjanović was named Partizan's honorary president.

== Political career ==
Marjanović was previously a member of the ruling party of SFR Yugoslavia until its dissolution in 1990 and shortly after that he became a member of the Socialist Party of Serbia. He quickly rose up through the ranks and after the 1993 parliamentary election he was chosen by Milošević as his prime minister. Some of the laws that were passed during his tenure allowed for the repression of professors, students and journalists who did not support Milošević's regime.

Marjanović continued to be seen as a mere extension of Slobodan Milošević who at this time held the post of President of Yugoslavia. Sources from the top levels of Milošević's Socialist Party of Serbia described Marjanović's government modus operandi in the Evropljanin magazine: "Prime Minister Marjanović suggests something – ministers do not vote – and then Marjanović simply concludes the matter as agreed on. Of course Marjanović neither suggests nor concludes anything without first consulting Milošević". Deputy Prime Minister Vojislav Šešelj indirectly confirmed this operating procedure when he said the government meetings are always well prepared, never lasting longer than 15–20 minutes. This two-year period is widely seen as the most brutal whilst Serbia was led by Milošević. Marjanović's government (with Šešelj as its deputy PM), passed two of what critics consider to be the most draconian pieces of legislation in Serbian political history: the University Law that stripped the University of Belgrade of its autonomy, opening the way for the government to install professors, deans and rectors, as well as the Information Law, which aimed to restrict the activities of media financed by political enemies; despite this, the media played a prominent role in the 5 October 2000 coup d'état. Similarly to his first term in office, Marjanović again took a back seat, leaving the limelight to more aggressive members of his cabinet like deputy PM Šešelj and Minister of Information Aleksandar Vučić.

Following the Bulldozer Revolution, he resigned on 21 October 2000 and was replaced by the transitional government led by Democratic Opposition of Serbia (DOS), the Socialist Party of Serbia (SPS), and the Serbian Renewal Movement (SPO). The transitional government existed until early January 2001, when a new government was elected after the 2000 parliamentary election.

== Death ==
He died on 21 February 2006, in Belgrade, aged 68, from undisclosed causes.

Political offices
Preceded by Nikola Šainović	Prime Minister of Serbia; 1994–2000	Succeeded by Milomir Minić
