= Nikola Šainović =

Prime Minister of Serbia (1993–1994)

- Никола Шаиновић
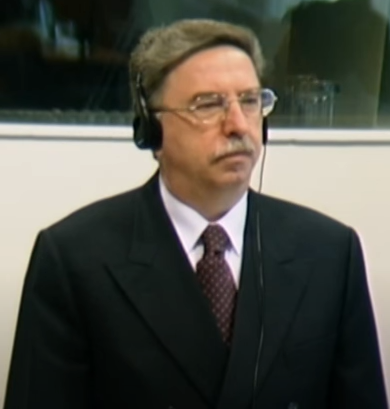
- Šainović in 2002

Deputy Prime Minister of FR Yugoslavia
- In office 22 February 1994 – 9 October 2000
- President: Slobodan Milošević
- Prime Minister: Radoje Kontić; Momir Bulatović

Prime Minister of Serbia
- In office 10 February 1993 – 18 March 1994
- President: Slobodan Milošević
- Deputy: Srboljub Vasović; Zoran Aranđelović; Saša Anđelković; Danilo Z. Marković; Dragoslav Jovanović
- Preceded by: Radoman Božović
- Succeeded by: Mirko Marjanović

Deputy Prime Minister of Serbia
- In office 23 December 1991 – 10 February 1993
- Prime Minister: Radoman Božović
- Preceded by: Velimir Radivojević; Nikola Stanić; Budimir Košutić
- Succeeded by: Danilo Z. Marković; Dragoslav Jovanović

Minister of Energy and Mining
- In office 11 February 1991 – 10 February 1993
- Prime Minister: Dragutin Zelenović; Radoman Božović
- Preceded by: Position established
- Succeeded by: Vladimir Živanović

Personal details
- Born: 7 December 1948 (age 77) Bor, PR Serbia, FPR Yugoslavia
- Party: League of Communists of Serbia (1977–90); Socialist Party of Serbia (1990–present)
- Spouse: Svetlana Šainović
- Children: 2
- Education: University of Belgrade; University of Ljubljana
- Occupation: Politician

Nikola Šainović (Serbian Cyrillic: Никола Шаиновић; born 7 December 1948) is a Serbian politician. A close associate of Slobodan Milošević, he held several important state functions of Serbia and FR Yugoslavia during the 1990s. He has been a member of the Socialist Party of Serbia since the party's foundation.

He served as the Deputy Prime Minister of FR Yugoslavia in charge of foreign affairs from 1994 to 2000, and represented Milošević as his emissary in Kosovo affairs from October 1998 during the Kosovo War. He previously served as the Prime Minister of Serbia from 1993 to 1994 and as the minister of Energy and Mining of Serbia and the Deputy Prime Minister of Serbia from 1991 to 1992.

In 2009, he was convicted by the International Criminal Tribunal for the Former Yugoslavia in The Hague (ICTY) for crimes against humanity and war crimes committed against ethnic Albanian civilians in 1999 during the Kosovo War. In 2015, he was granted early release after serving two-thirds of his sentence.

== Education and career ==
Šainović finished primary and secondary school in his hometown and later graduated from the University of Belgrade's Technical Faculty in Bor in 1973. He earned a master's degree from the University of Ljubljana in 1977 as a Chemical engineer.

Soon afterwards he entered politics by becoming a member of the League of Communists of Serbia, Serbian branch of the League of Communists of Yugoslavia. He presided for four years over Bor Municipal Committee of the League of Communists and held several important executive positions in Yugoslavian energy powerhouse RTB Bor during the 1980s.

In 1989, he became a member of the Executive Council of the Serbian Parliament. At the same time, he was named the Republican Secretary for industry, energy and construction. In 1991, the League of Communists of Serbia transformed into the Socialist Party of Serbia.

From 1991 to 1992 he served as the minister of Energy and Mining of Serbia and held the office of the Deputy Prime Minister of Serbia. In 1992 he also served as the Minister of Economy.

On 10 February 1993, Šainović became the president of a minority Government of the Republic of Serbia after the SPS won the largest number of votes in the 20 December 1992 parliamentary election, with support from the Serbian Radical Party. On 18 March 1994, he resigned from office to be appointed Deputy Prime Minister of the Federal Republic of Yugoslavia in charge of foreign affairs, on 22 February 1994.

He soon made greater inner-party progress. On 28 November 1995 he was elected by the SPS party members into the executive council of the Socialist Party of Serbia, as well as its steering committee.

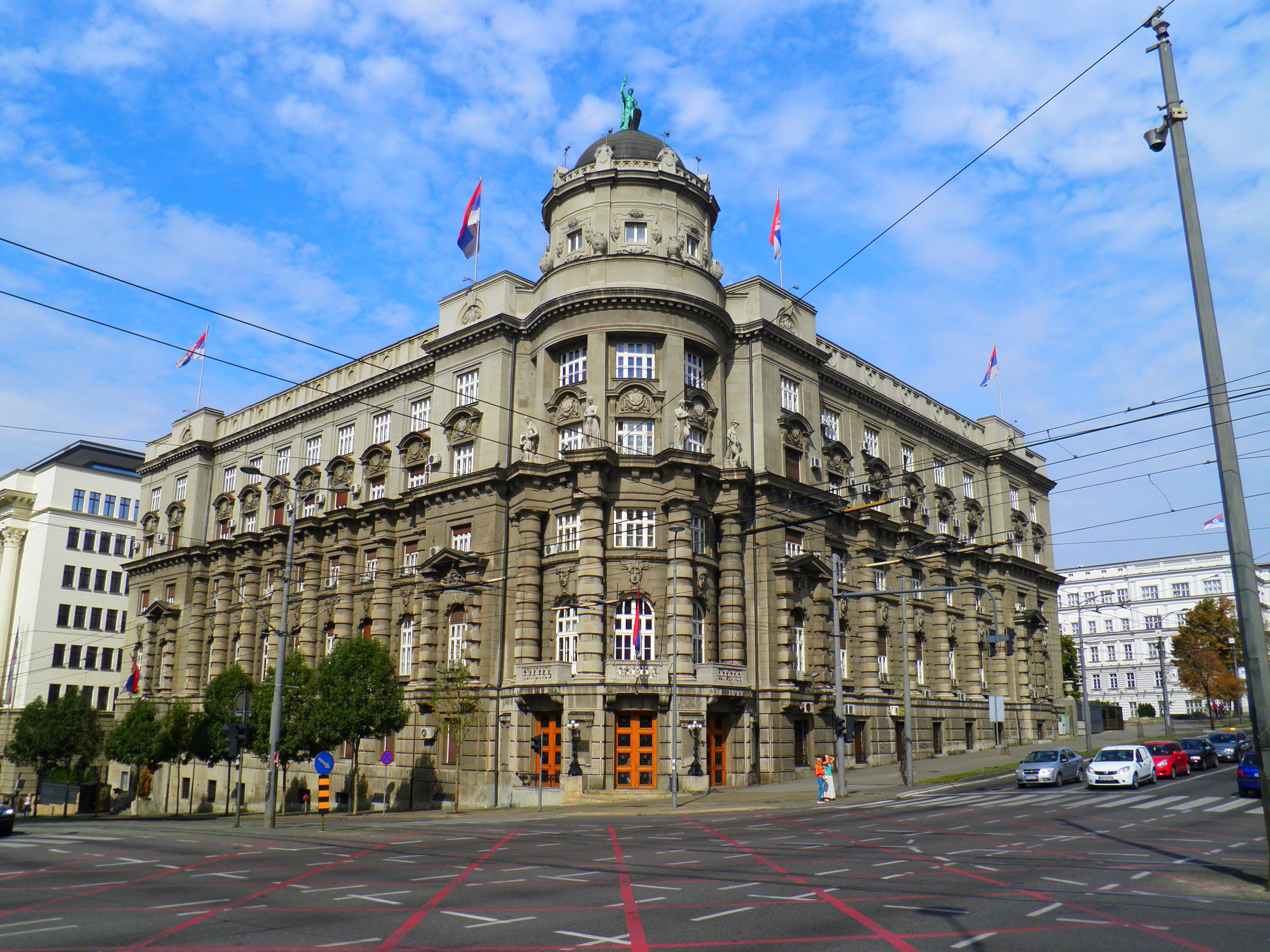
The building of the Serbian Government

Šainović was reappointed FRY Deputy Prime Minister in 1996 under Radoje Kontić of the Democratic Party of Socialists of Montenegro after the 3 November 1996 parliamentary election on which SPS won the largest number of votes for the Serbian seats in the Council of Citizens of the FRY Federal Assembly. He was reappointed on new sessions in 1997, and again on 20 May 1998.

FR Yugoslavia and SPS President Slobodan Milošević entrusted Šainović with representing him in 1998 with the Kosovo affairs, where inner-ethnic tensions escalated into a full-scale inter-state conflict. Šainović presided over the "Commission of Cooperation with the Mission for Verification of the Organization for Security and Cooperation in Europe in Kosovo.

He signed the Clark-Naumann Agreement, which mandated partial removal of FRY and Serbian forces from Kosovo and limitation of introduction of additional forces and equipment, as well as the deployment of unarmed OSCE verifiers. He was also a member of the Yugoslavian and Serbian delegation in the failed Rambouillet peace talks with the Kosovo Albanian leaders from 7 February to mid-March 1999. He stayed in the office of Deputy Prime Minister of FR Yugoslavia until the overthrow of Slobodan Milošević in October 2000.

== ICTY trial and sentence ==
The ICTY indicted him in May 1999 for being responsible together with Slobodan Milošević, Milan Milutinović, Dragoljub Ojdanić and Vlajko Stojiljković in a joint criminal enterprise spreading widespread terror and violence upon the ethnic Albanian population in Kosovo in the period from 1 January 1999 to 20 June 1999. After the Yugoslavian Federal Assembly passed the bill permitting extradition of its citizens to the Hague tribunal, his lawyers had contacted the authorities to discuss his surrender. Šainović surrendered and was transferred to the ICTY on 2 May 2002.

His trial began on 10 July 2006. On 26 February 2009, the ICTY sentenced Šainović to 22 years in prison, following a conviction for crimes against humanity and war crimes, including deportations and forcible transfers, murders and other persecutions. On 23 January 2014 his sentence was reduced to 18 years on appeal.

In June 2015, Šainović's attorneys asked for early release from the prison, explaining that he has served nearly two-thirds of the sentence, during which his behavior was commendable; also adding that his health is weak due to age and diagnosed diabetes and glaucoma. On 26 August 2015, three months after the request by his lawyers, he was released from the prison after serving (including pretrial detention and time served) two-thirds of his sentence.

== Post-Hague release ==
On 3 September 2015, just a week after having been released from prison, he was appointed to the board of the Socialist Party of Serbia, one of the ruling parties in the country. In December 2017, Šainović was nominated for the Chairmanship board of the Socialist Party of Serbia.

== Personal life ==
Šainović and his wife, Svetlana, have two sons, and reside in Belgrade.

== See also ==
- Cabinet of Nikola Šainović
- War crimes in the Kosovo War
- Operation Horseshoe

Political offices
Preceded by	Deputy Prime Minister of FR Yugoslavia; 1994–2000	Succeeded by
Preceded by Radoman Božović	Prime Minister of Serbia; 1993–1994	Succeeded by Mirko Marjanović
Preceded by Velimir Radivojević; Nikola Stanić; Budimir Košutić	Deputy Prime Minister of Serbia; 1991–1993	Succeeded by Danilo Z. Marković; Dragoslav Jovanović
Preceded by Position established	Minister of Energy and Mining of Serbia; 1991–1993	Succeeded by Vladimir Živanović
