= Radoman Božović =

Serbian former politician (1991–1993)

- Радоман Божовић

Prime Minister of Serbia
- In office 23 December 1991 – 10 February 1993
- President: Slobodan Milošević
- Preceded by: Dragutin Zelenović
- Succeeded by: Nikola Šainović

Chairman of the Executive Council of Vojvodina
- In office 27 December 1989 – 23 December 1991
- Preceded by: Jovan Radić
- Succeeded by: Koviljko Lovre

Personal details
- Born: 13 January 1953 (age 73) Šipačno, Montenegro, Yugoslavia
- Party: League of Communists of Vojvodina (1981–1990); Socialist Party of Serbia (since 1990)

Radoman Božović (Serbian: Радоман Божовић; born 13 January 1953) is a Serbian former politician who served as the prime minister of Serbia from 1991 to 1993.

== Biography ==
Božović was born in Šipačno, Montenegro in 1953. He completed grades 1-3 of elementary school in Nikšić. After elementary school he moved to Serbia, and completed secondary education in Vrbas. In 1975, he graduated from the University of Subotica, School of Economics, where he got a job as an assistant. He obtained his master's degree in 1978 and a Ph.D. in 1981 from the University of Belgrade. His thesis, titled "Social Ownership and Economic Relations of Socialist Self-management" and supervised by Ivan Maksimović and Dragutin Šoškić, strongly supports "non-property ownership of social property", circumventing theoretical pitfalls of income-based economy. He returned to Montenegro for some time, working as a professor at the Veljko Vlahović University in Titograd.

In Subotica he entered politics by becoming the Secretary of the Municipal Committee of the Communist League of Subotica. When he joined the Socialist Party of Serbia, Slobodan Milošević predicted a great future for him. In subsequent years he held a number of public offices. He was elected into the Parliament of Vojvodina in 1990. In 1989 he became the President of the Executive Council of Vojvodina. Then, he became one of Vojodina's representatives in, and soon afterwards the President of, the Parliament of Yugoslavia. As an SPS MP in the Serbian Parliament, the leader of the party's parliamentary group, and a member of the Parliamentary Committee for Relations with Serbs outside Serbia. Because of his experience in Vojvodina, he was elected into the SPS Executive Committee for Vojvodina, where he had supervisory control over the media in the province.

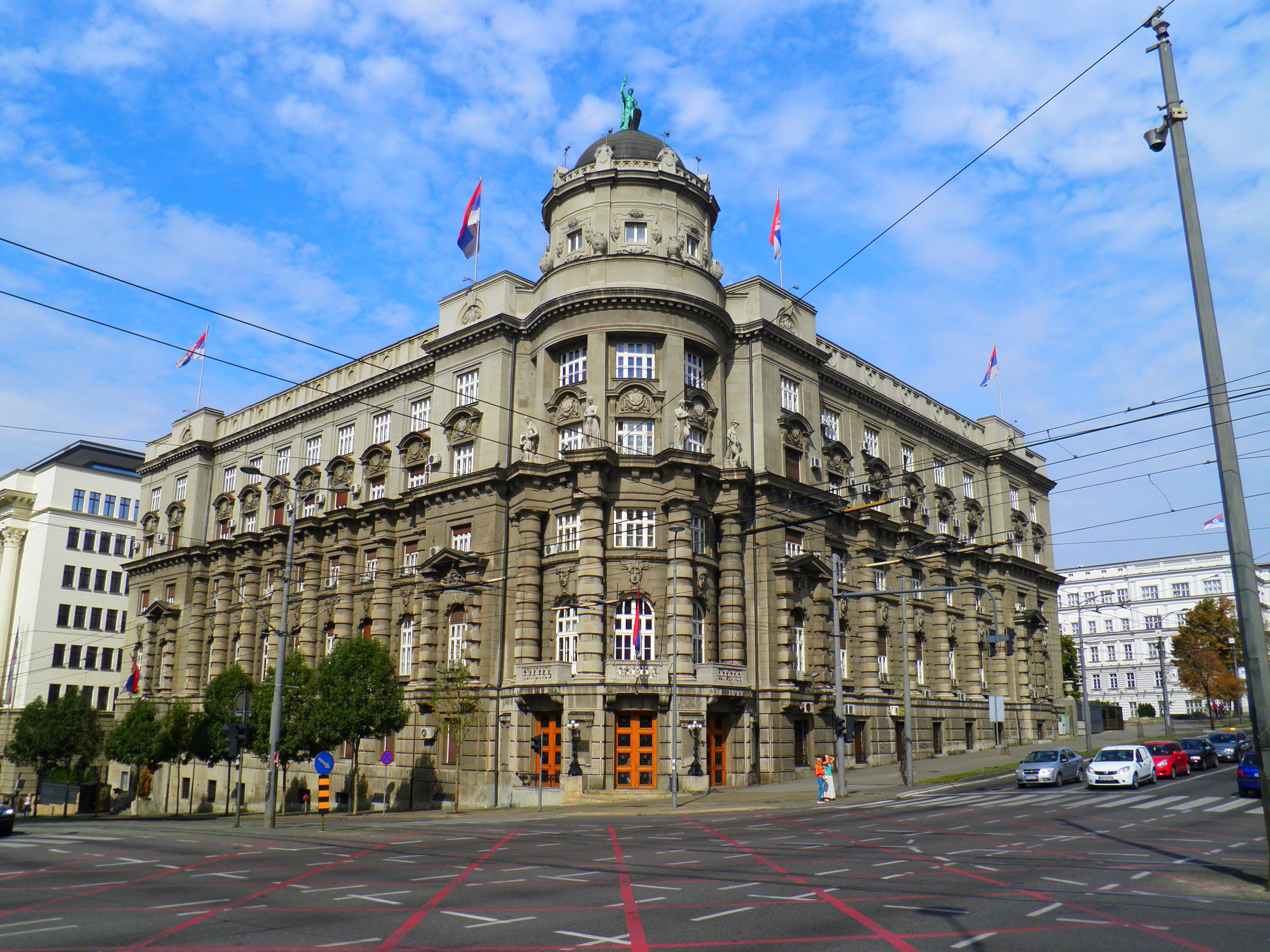
The building of the Serbian Government

Božović became the Prime Minister of Serbia on December 23, 1991, after the previous cabinet resigned due to economic failure. As Prime Minister, he was a hardcore bureaucrat, under whom more than half of Serbian economy was under state ownership. After only 100 days in office, the inflation reached a shocking 10,000%. His term was marked by a scandal in which two ministers from his cabinet were arrested, as well as his frequent arguments with opposition leader Vojislav Šešelj. On February 10, 1993, the new minority cabinet of SPS, supported by SRS, was formed as a result of the December 20, 1992 parliamentary elections. Božović opposed the support from SRS, so he refused another term.

He then became an SPS MP in the Chamber of Citizens of the Federal Assembly of the Federal Republic of Yugoslavia, and served as the President of the Chamber from February 3, 1993 to December 10, 1996, supported by SPS and DPS CG), and opposed by a more than one-third minority (SRS, NS CG, DS, DEPOS coalition consisting of SPO and DSS). He was accused of instigating and allowing excessive verbal aggressiveness against the opposition MPs during sessions (notably against SPO MP Mihajlo Marković). He had a significant role in removing Dobrica Ćosić from the office of the President of Yugoslavia on June 1, 1993, and electing Zoran Lilić, a pro-Milošević candidate.

After 1996 he left SPS and retired to Montenegro, where he spends time skiing.

Political offices
Preceded by Dragutin Zelenović	Prime Minister of Serbia; 1991–1993	Succeeded by Nikola Šainović
