= Secretariat-General of the Government (Serbia) =

Secretariat-General of the Government of Serbia
- Генерални секретаријат Владе Србије; Generalni sekretarijat Vlade Srbije
- Incumbent; Petar Janjić since 16 April 2025
- Appointer: Đuro Macut; Prime Minister
- Website: gs.gov.rs

The Secretariat-General of the Government (Serbian: Генерални секретаријат Владе, romanized: Generalni sekretarijat Vlade), formally Secretariat-General of the Government of the Republic of Serbia (Serbian: Генерални секретаријат Владе Републике Србије, romanized: Generalni sekretarijat Vlade Republike Srbije), is a body of the Government of Serbia in charge of administrative work and coordination between the Office of the Prime Minister and individual ministries. It is headed by the Secretary-General of the Government (Serbian: Генерални секретар Владе, romanized: Generalni sekretar Vlade). The current Secretary-General is Petar Janjić, in office since 16 April 2025.

== List of secretaries-general ==
Political Party: SPS DS DSS SNS

Name (Birth–Death)	Party	Term of office		Prime Minister (Cabinet)
Secretary of the Government
Budimir Jovković (born 1940)	SPS	11 February 1991	10 February 1993	Zelenović (I); Božović (I)
Secretary-General of the Government
Budimir Jovković (born 1940)	SPS	10 February 1993	18 February 1994	Šainović (I)
Živka Knežević	SPS	18 March 1994	25 January 2001	Marjanović (I • II); Minić (transitional)
Maja Vasić (born 1954)	DS	25 January 2001	3 March 2004	Đinđić (I); Živković (I)
Dejan Mihajlov (born 1972)	DSS	3 March 2004	7 July 2008	Koštunica (I • II)
Tamara Stojčević (born 1966)	DS	8 July 2008	27 July 2012	Cvetković (I)
Veljko Odalović (born 1956)	SPS	27 July 2012	1 May 2014	Dačić (I)
Novak Nedić (born 1982)	SNS	1 May 2014	16 April 2025	Vučić (I • II); Brnabić (I • II • III); Vučević (I)
Petar Janjić	SNS	16 April 2025	Present	Macut (I)
