= Novak Nedić =

Serbian politician and lawyer

- Новак Недић
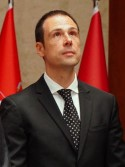
- Nedić in 2024

Secretary-General of the Government of Serbia
- In office 1 May 2014 – 17 April 2025
- Prime Minister: Aleksandar Vučić; Ana Brnabić; Ivica Dačić (acting); Miloš Vučević; Đuro Macut
- Preceded by: Veljko Odalović
- Succeeded by: Petar Janjić

Deputy Secretary-General of the Government of Serbia
- In office 28 November 2012 – 1 May 2014
- Prime Minister: Ivica Dačić

Personal details
- Born: 1982 (age 43–44) Belgrade, SR Serbia, SFR Yugoslavia
- Party: SNS
- Education: University of Belgrade
- Occupation: Politician; lawyer

Novak Nedić (Serbian Cyrillic: Новак Недић; born 1982) is a Serbian politician, lawyer and sports administrator who served as the secretary-general of the Government of Serbia from 2014 to 2025. A member of the populist Serbian Progressive Party (SNS).

== Early life, education and law career ==
Nedić was born in 1982 in Belgrade, SR Serbia, SFR Yugoslavia. He graduated from the Sixth Belgrade Gymnasium and the Faculty of Law at the University of Belgrade. From 2000 to 2005, he worked as a volunteer intern at the Commercial Court in Belgrade and then as an intern and later a lawyer at the Nedić Law Firm. He deals with commercial and criminal law and holds a Certificate of Special Knowledge on the Rights of the Child and the Criminal Law Protection of Juveniles.

== Political career ==
Nedić is a high-ranking member of the Serbian Progressive Party (SNS). On 28 November 2012, he was appointed deputy secretary-general of the Government of Serbia and the cabinet of Ivica Dačić. He was appointed secretary-general of the Government of Serbia and the first cabinet of Aleksandar Vučić on 1 May 2014. Since then, he has been serving as the secretary-general and also held this position during the second cabinet of Aleksandar Vučić and the first, second and third cabinet of Ana Brnabić, and cabinet of Miloš Vučević. He briefly served in the cabinet of Đuro Macut until his dismissal on 17 April 2025.

He is a member of the main and executive board of SNS, and the president of the legal affairs council of SNS's Belgrade branch.

== Sports administrator ==
Nedić is also known for his involvement with FK Partizan, where he served as a member of the board of directors until 2014, when he resigned. His father, Vojislav Nedić, a prominent lawyer and also a member of the SNS, was the vice-president of the club until 2016. The Nedić family has been considered as éminence grise of the club for a long time.

== Disputes ==
In February 2014 Serbian media reported that a female government employee alleged that she had been subjected to inappropriate behavior and threats by a high-ranking official within the General Secretariat of the Government of Serbia. According to the reports, the employee claimed that the official had initially assisted her in obtaining her position, but later began to act in a threatening manner when she feared she might be dismissed.

The timing of the allegations, which came after the employee reportedly learned she was about to be removed from her role, has led to public debate about the credibility and potential motivations behind the claims. As of January 2026, no formal criminal complaint or internal disciplinary procedure has been publicly confirmed. The accused official has not responded publicly, and no official action has been taken against him.
