= Cabinet of Milomir Minić =

- 6th Cabinet of Republic of Serbia
- 2000–2001
- Date formed: 25 October 2000
- Date dissolved: 25 January 2001

People and organisations
- Head of state: Milan Milutinović
- Head of government: Milomir Minić
- Member parties: SPS; DOS; SPO
- Status in legislature: Transitional government

History
- Predecessor: Cabinet of Mirko Marjanović II
- Successor: Cabinet of Zoran Đinđić

The Cabinet of Milomir Minić was elected on 25 October 2000, after the defeat of Slobodan Milošević on the presidential election. At that point, and after the resignation of the Serbian Prime Minister Mirko Marjanović, it became clear that the Socialist Party of Serbia would lose the next early parliamentary election, so this transitional government was formed, based on the agreement signed on 16 October by Socialist Party of Serbia (SPS), Democratic Opposition of Serbia (DOS) and Serbian Renewal Movement (SPO).

== Cabinet members ==
Position	Portfolio	Name	Party
Prime Minister	General Affairs	Milomir Minić	SPS
Deputy Prime Minister	General Affairs	Nebojša Čović	DOS
Deputy Prime Minister	General Affairs	Spasoje Krunić	SPO
Collegium of Ministers	Internal Affairs	Slobodan Tomović	SPS
Collegium of Ministers	Internal Affairs	Božo Prelević	DOS
Collegium of Ministers	Internal Affairs	Stevan Nikčević	SPO
Collegium of Ministers	Justice	Zoran Nikolić	SPS
Collegium of Ministers	Justice	Dragan Subašić	DOS
Collegium of Ministers	Justice	Sead Spahović	SPO
Collegium of Ministers	Information	Ivica Dačić	SPS
Collegium of Ministers	Information	Biserka Matić	DOS
Collegium of Ministers	Information	Bogoljub Pejčić	SPO
Collegium of Ministers	Finance	Borislav Milačić	SPS
Collegium of Ministers	Finance	Ljubiša Jovanović	DOS
Collegium of Ministers	Finance	Bojan Dimitrijević	SPO
Minister	Local Self-Government	Veljko Odalović	SPS
Minister	Economic and Ownership Transformation	Oskar Kovač	SPS
Minister	Family Services	Slavica Đukić-Dejanović	SPS
Minister	Trade	Milorad Mišković (resigned 19 December 2000)	SPS
Minister	Tourism	Tomislav Milenković	SPS
Minister	Construction	Dejan Kovačević	SPS
Minister	Agriculture	Živanko Radovančev	SPS
Minister	Education	Mihailo Jokić	SPS
Minister	Environmental Protection	Mila Rosić	SPS
Minister	Energy and Mining	Srboljub Antić	DOS
Minister	Labour, Veteran and Social Policy	Gordana Matković	DOS
Minister	High Education	Gašo Knežević	DOS
Minister	Health	Nada Kostić	DOS
Minister	International Economic Relations	Goran Pitić	DOS
Minister	Religion	Gordana Aničić	SPO
Minister	Serbian Diaspora	Vojislav Vukčević	SPO
Minister	Transportation	Aleksandar Milutinović	SPO
Minister	Industry	Veroljub Stevanović	SPO

== See also ==
- Cabinet of Serbia (2001–04)
- Cabinet of Serbia (2004–07)
- Cabinet of Serbia (2007–08)
- Cabinet of Serbia (2008–12)
- Cabinet of Serbia (2012–14)
- Cabinet of Serbia
