= Ministry of Tourism and Youth (Serbia) =

Government ministry of Serbia

- Министарство туризма и омладине Ministarstvo turizma i omladine

Ministry overview
- Formed: 22 October 2022; 2 years ago
- Preceding agencies: Ministry of Trade, Tourism, and Telecommunications; Ministry of Youth and Sports
- Jurisdiction: Government of Serbia
- Headquarters: Palace of Serbia, Bulevar Mihajla Pupina 2, Belgrade
- Minister responsible: Husein Memić
- Website: mto.gov.rs

Ministry of Tourism and Youth (Serbian: Министарство туризма и омладине, romanized: Ministarstvo turizma i omladine) is a ministry in the Government of Serbia, created by a vote of the National Assembly of Serbia on 22 October 2022. Husein Memić has served as its minister since 26 October 2022, when the third cabinet of Ana Brnabić was sworn in.

== History ==
The ministry was established after the split of Ministry of Trade, Tourism and Telecommunications and Ministry of Youth and Sports.

== Organization ==
There are four departments in the ministry:

- Department for tourism
- Department for youth
- Department for international cooperation and European integration
- Tourism Inspection

== List of ministers ==
Political Party: SDPS

No.	Portrait	Minister	Took office	Left office	Time in office	Party	Cabinet
1	Husein Memić	Husein Memić (born 1983)	26 October 2022	Incumbent	2 years, 358 days	SDPS	Brnabić (III); Vučević (I)
