= Ministry of Privatization =

Ministry of Privatisation may refers to;

- Ministry of Privatisation (Pakistan)
- Ministry of Privatization and Economic Reconstruction (Serbia)
