= Deputy Prime Minister of Serbia =

Deputy head of the Government of Serbia

- Потпредседник Владе Србије; Potpredsednik Vlade Srbije
- Greater coat of arms of Serbia
- Incumbent; Siniša Mali, Ivica Dačić, and Adrijana Mesarović since 26 October 2022 (Mali); 26 October 2022 (Dačić); 16 April 2025 (Mesarović)
- Seat: Government Building, Nemanjina 11, Belgrade
- Appointer: Đuro Macut; Prime Minister of Serbia
- Term length: No term limit
- Inaugural holder: Slobodan Prohaska, Velimir Radivojević, Nikola Stanić, and Jovan Zebić
- Formation: 11 February 1991; 35 years ago
- Website: srbija.gov.rs

The Deputy Prime Minister of Serbia (Serbian: Потпредседник Владе Србије, romanized: Potpredsednik Vlade Srbije, literally translated as Vice President of the Government of Serbia), is the official Deputy of the Prime Minister of Serbia.

According to convention, one deputy position is allocated to each junior partner in the ruling coalition, being ranked according to the size of their respective parties.

== History of the office ==
The office of the Deputy Prime Minister of Serbia was established in 1991, during the government of Dragutin Zelenović. It was initially held by four people: Slobodan Prohaska, Velimir Radivojević, Nikola Stanić, and Jovan Zebić. Since then, the office was usually held simultaneously by several people at the same time (in the government of Zoran Đinđić there were eight Deputy Prime Ministers at one point). Also, Deputy Prime Ministers may or may not combine the post with another government portfolio.

The current Deputy Prime Ministers, by date of assuming office, are namely: Siniša Mali (since 26 October 2022), Ivica Dačić (since 26 October 2022), and Adrijana Mesarović (since 16 April 2025).

== List of deputy prime ministers ==
Political Party: SPS n-s ND/LS SRS SPO DA SD DSS PDS SDP SVM RV DS G17+ PUPS SNS URS SDPS PS

Name (Birth–Death)	Party	Term of office		Charge	Prime Minister (Cabinet)
Slobodan Prohaska (born 1943)	SPS	11 February 1991	31 July 1991		Zelenović (I)
Velimir Radivojević (born 1938)	SPS	11 February 1991	23 December 1991		Zelenović (I)
Nikola Stanić (born 1937)	SPS	11 February 1991	23 December 1991		Zelenović (I)
Jovan Zebić (1939–2007)	SPS	11 February 1991	10 February 1993		Zelenović (I); Božović (I)
Budimir Košutić (born 1941)	SPS	31 July 1991	23 December 1991		Zelenović (I)
Nebojša Maljković (born 1954)	SPS	23 December 1991	10 February 1993		Božović (I)
Nikola Šainović (born 1948)	SPS	23 December 1991	10 February 1993		Božović (I)
Zoran Aranđelović (born 1948)	SPS	23 December 1991	29 June 1993		Božović (I); Šainović (I)
Srboljub Vasović (born 1941)	SPS	23 December 1991	18 March 1994		Božović (I); Šainović (I)
Danilo Z. Marković (1933–2018)	SPS	10 February 1993	18 March 1994		Šainović (I)
Dragoslav Jovanović (born 1937)	SPS	10 February 1993	18 March 1994		Šainović (I)
Saša Anđelković (born 1941)	SPS	14 July 1993	7 September 1993		Šainović (I)
Slobodan Unković (born 1938)	SPS	18 March 1994	28 May 1996		Marjanović (I)
Slobodan Babić (born 1946)	SPS	18 March 1994	11 February 1997		Marjanović (I)
Slobodan Radulović (1943–2014)	n-p	18 March 1994	24 March 1998		Marjanović (I)
Slobodan Radulović (1943–2014)	ND	18 March 1994	24 March 1998		Marjanović (I)
Svetozar Krstić (born 1960)	SPS	18 March 1994	24 March 1998		Marjanović (I)
Ratko Marković (1944–2021)	SPS	18 March 1994	24 October 2000		Marjanović (I • II)
Nedeljko Šipovac (1942–2025)	SPS	28 May 1996	15 April 1997		Marjanović (I)
Milutin Stojković (born 1942)	SPS	11 February 1997	24 March 1998		Marjanović (I)
Vlajko Stojiljković (1937–2002)	SPS	15 April 1997	24 March 1998	Internal Affairs	Marjanović (I)
Milovan Bojić (born 1955)	JUL	24 March 1998	24 October 2000	General Affairs	Marjanović (II)
Dragan Tomić (born 1937)	SPS	24 March 1998	24 October 2000	General Affairs	Marjanović (II)
Vojislav Šešelj (born 1954)	SRS	24 March 1998	24 October 2000	General Affairs	Marjanović (II)
Tomislav Nikolić (born 1952)	SRS	24 March 1998	20 November 1999	General Affairs	Marjanović (II)
Dragan Todorović (born 1953)	SRS	20 November 1999	24 October 2000	General Affairs	Marjanović (II)
Spasoje Krunić (1939–2020)	SPO	24 October 2000	25 January 2001	General Affairs	Minić (transitional)
Nebojša Čović (born 1958)	DA (DOS)	24 October 2000	3 March 2004	General Affairs	Minić (transitional); Đinđić (I); Živković (I)
Vuk Obradović (1947–2008)	SD (DOS)	25 January 2001	11 June 2001	General Affairs	Đinđić (I)
Aleksandar Pravdić (born 1958)	DSS (DOS)	25 January 2001	22 October 2001	General Affairs	Đinđić (I)
Momčilo Perišić (born 1944)	PDS (DOS)	25 January 2001	27 March 2002	General Affairs	Đinđić (I)
Dušan Mihajlović (born 1948)	ND/LS (DOS)	25 January 2001	3 March 2004	Internal Affairs	Đinđić (I); Živković (I)
Žarko Korać (born 1947)	SDP (DOS)	25 January 2001	3 March 2004	General Affairs	Đinđić (I); Živković (I)
József Kasza (1945–2016)	SVM (DOS)	25 January 2001	3 March 2004	General Affairs	Đinđić (I); Živković (I)
Miodrag Isakov (born 1950)	RV (DOS)	25 January 2001	3 March 2004	General Affairs	Đinđić (I); Živković (I)
Čedomir Jovanović (born 1971)	DS (DOS)	18 March 2003	3 March 2004	General Affairs	Živković (I)
Miroljub Labus (born 1947)	G17+	3 March 2004	3 May 2006	General Affairs	Koštunica (I)
Ivana Dulić-Marković (born 1961)	G17+	20 June 2006	9 November 2006	General Affairs	Koštunica (I)
Božidar Đelić (born 1965)	DS	15 May 2007	15 December 2011	Deputy Prime Minister for European Integrations	Koštunica (II); Cvetković (I)
Ivica Dačić (born 1966)	SPS	7 July 2008	27 July 2012	First Deputy Prime Minister; Internal Affairs	Cvetković (I)
Mlađan Dinkić (born 1964)	G17+	7 July 2008	21 February 2011	Economy and Regional Development	Cvetković (I)
Jovan Krkobabić (1930–2014)	PUPS	7 July 2008	22 April 2014 (Died in office)	Labour, Employment, and Social Policy (from 27 July 2012)	Cvetković (I); Dačić (I)
Verica Kalanović (born 1954)	G17+	14 March 2011	27 July 2012	Deputy Prime Minister for Economy	Cvetković (I)
Aleksandar Vučić (born 1970)	SNS	27 July 2012	27 April 2014	First Deputy Prime Minister; Defence (until 2 September 2013)	Dačić (I)
Suzana Grubješić (born 1963)	G17+	27 July 2012	2 September 2013	Deputy Prime Minister for European Integrations	Dačić (I)
Suzana Grubješić (born 1963)	URS	27 July 2012	2 September 2013	Deputy Prime Minister for European Integrations	Dačić (I)
Rasim Ljajić (born 1964)	SDPS	27 July 2012	28 October 2020	Trade, Tourism, and Telecommunications	Dačić (I); Vučić (I • II); Brnabić (I)
Ivica Dačić (born 1966)	SPS	27 April 2014	22 October 2020	First Deputy Prime Minister; Foreign Affairs	Vučić (I • II); Brnabić (I)
Kori Udovički (born 1961)	n-p	27 April 2014	11 August 2016	State Administration and Local Self-Government	Vučić (I)
Zorana Mihajlović (born 1970)	SNS	27 April 2014	26 October 2022	Construction, Transport, and Infrastructure (until 28 October 2020); Mining and Energy (from 28 October 2020)	Vučić (I • II); Brnabić (I • II)
Nebojša Stefanović (born 1976)	SNS	11 August 2016	26 October 2022	Internal Affairs (until 28 October 2020); Defence (from 28 October 2020)	Vučić (II); Brnabić (I • II)
Branko Ružić (born 1975)	SPS	28 October 2020	26 October 2022	First Deputy Prime Minister; Education, Science, and Technological Development	Brnabić (II)
Maja Gojković (born 1963)	SNS	28 October 2020	2 May 2024	Culture and Information	Brnabić (II • III)
Branislav Nedimović (born 1977)	SNS	28 October 2020	26 October 2022	Agriculture, Forestry, and Water Management	Brnabić (II)
Miloš Vučević (born 1974)	SNS	26 October 2022	2 May 2024	Defence	Brnabić (III)
Irena Vujović (born 1983)	SNS	2 May 2024	16 April 2025	Environmental Protection	Vučević (I)
Aleksandar Vulin (born 1972)	PS	2 May 2024	16 April 2025	General Affairs	Vučević (I)
Ivica Dačić (born 1966)	SPS	26 October 2022	Present	First Deputy Prime Minister; Foreign Affairs (until 2 May 2024); Internal Affairs (from 2 May 2024)	Brnabić (III); Vučević (I); Macut (I)
Siniša Mali (born 1972)	SNS	26 October 2022	Present	Finance; First Deputy Prime Minister (from 2 May 2024)	Brnabić (III); Vučević (I); Macut (I)
Adrijana Mesarović (born 1981)	SNS	16 April 2025	Present	Economy	Macut (I)

== See also ==
- Government of Serbia
