= Mihajlov =

Mihajlov is a surname. Notable people with the surname include:

- Dejan Mihajlov (born 1972), Serbian lawyer and politician
- Gorazd Mihajlov (born 1974), Macedonian football coach and former player
- Mihajlo Mihajlov (1934–2010), Serbian author, academic and publicist
- Miloš Mihajlov (born 1982), Serbian footballer
