= Mesarović =

Mesarović (also spelt Mesarovic) is a surname. People with the surname include:

- Mihajlo D. Mesarovic, a Serbian scientist
- Aleksandar Mesarović, a Serbian footballer
- Adrijana Mesarović, a Serbian politician
