= Husein Memić =

Serbian politician (born 1983)

- Хусеин Мемић
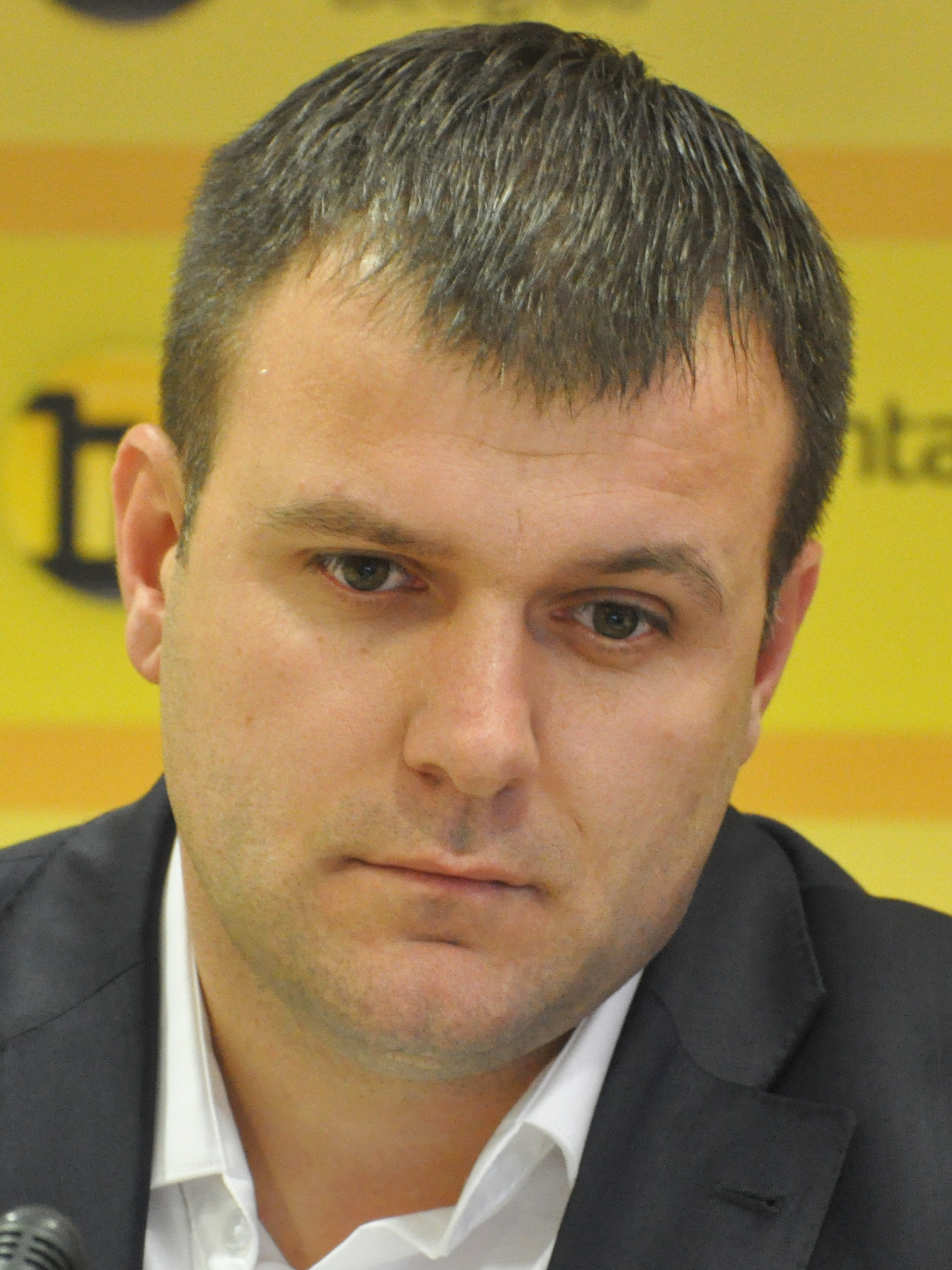
- Memić in 2019

Minister of Tourism and Youth
- Incumbent
- Assumed office 26 October 2022
- Prime Minister: Ana Brnabić; Ivica Dačić (acting); Miloš Vučević; Đuro Macut
- Preceded by: Position established

Personal details
- Born: 24 March 1983 (age 43) Novi Pazar, SR Serbia, SFR Yugoslavia
- Party: SDPS; SDP
- Occupation: Politician

Husein Memić (Serbian Cyrillic: Хусеин Мемић; born 24 March 1983) is a Serbian politician serving as minister of tourism and youth since 2022. An ethnic Bosniak, Memić is a member of the Social Democratic Party of Serbia (SDPS) and its Sandžak affiliate Sandžak Democratic Party (SDP).

== Biography ==
Memić was born on 24 March 1983 in Novi Pazar, SR Serbia, SFR Yugoslavia. He finished his secondary education at a school in Novi Pazar, graduated from the Faculty of Physical Culture and later gained a master's degree in tourism and hospitality. Memić is a licensed tour guide.

He played handball for RK Novi Pazar from 1999 to 2008. Between 2008 and 2012, Memić was a member of the main board of the Tourist Association of Novi Pazar. He has been the director of the Cultural Center of Novi Pazar from 2012 to 2022. He served in the main board of RK Novi Pazar from 2017 to 2021 and in the main board of Association of the Handball clubs of the ARKUS SuperLeague from 2020 to 2021.

=== Political career ===
Memić is a member of the Social Democratic Party of Serbia (SDPS) and its Sandžak affiliate Sandžak Democratic Party (SDP). He served as vice president of SDP's branch in Novi Pazar. In April 2018, he was appointed vice-president of SDP. In early October 2022, Memić criticized the internal affairs minister Aleksandar Vulin for his decision not to accept any of more than 20 Bosniaks who applied for basic training for fire and rescue units.

On 23 October 2022, it was announced that Memić was nominated for the post of minister of tourism and youth in the third cabinet of Ana Brnabić. He was sworn in on 26 October.

Memić headed the SDP's electoral list in the 2022 Bosniak National Council election. The final results are not yet known, but the SDP has claimed victory with 13 seats.
