= Siniša Mali =

Finance Minister of Serbia

- Синиша Мали
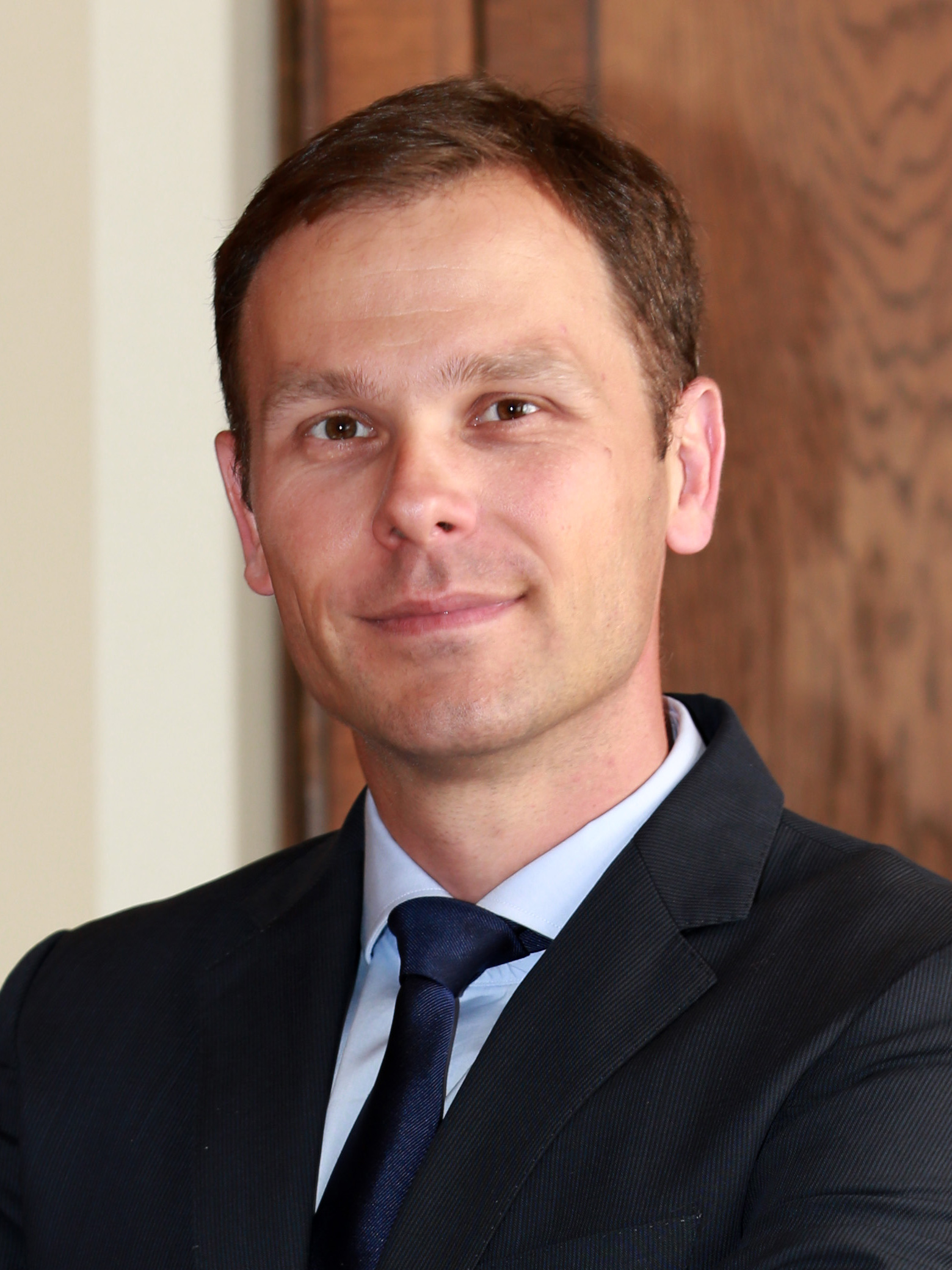
- Mali in 2015

First Deputy Prime Minister of Serbia
- Incumbent
- Assumed office 26 October 2022
- Prime Minister: Ana Brnabić; Ivica Dačić (acting); Miloš Vučević; Đuro Macut
- Preceded by: Nebojša Stefanović

Minister of Finance
- Incumbent
- Assumed office 29 May 2018
- Prime Minister: Ana Brnabić; Ivica Dačić (acting); Miloš Vučević; Đuro Macut
- Preceded by: Dušan Vujović; Ana Brnabić (acting)

Minister of Economy
- Acting; 22 June 2023 – 6 September 2023
- Prime Minister: Ana Brnabić
- Preceded by: Rade Basta
- Succeeded by: Slobodan Cvetković

73rd Mayor of Belgrade
- In office 24 April 2014 – 28 May 2018
- Preceded by: Dragan Đilas
- Succeeded by: Andreja Mladenović (acting); Zoran Radojičić

Personal details
- Born: 25 August 1972 (age 54) Belgrade, SR Serbia, SFR Yugoslavia
- Party: SNS (2014–present)
- Children: 4
- Education: University of Belgrade; Washington University in St. Louis; Technical University of Košice
- Occupation: Politician
- Profession: Economist

Siniša Mali (Note: Serbian Cyrillic: Синиша Мали, pronounced [sǐniʃa mâːliː]) (born 25 August 1972) is a Serbian economist and politician serving as first deputy prime minister of Serbia since 2024 and as minister of finance since 2018. A member of the Serbian Progressive Party (SNS), he previously served as mayor of Belgrade from 2014 to 2018, and as the president of the Temporary Council of Belgrade from 2013 to 2014. Following the dismissal of Rade Basta in June 2023, he also served as acting minister of economy.

The discovery of plagiarism in Mali's doctoral dissertation was one of the triggers for the anti-government protests leading to the 12-day students' blockade of the university's main building and the decision of the University of Belgrade to revoke his doctorate. Believing that his doctorate was unjustly revoked, Mali initiated court proceedings, and in March 2023 the Administrative Court issued a verdict that annulled the decision of the University Senate to revoke his doctorate on technical grounds. As of 2025, the university has not complied with the court's order.

== Early life and education ==
Siniša Mali was born on 25 August 1972, in Belgrade. He graduated from the primary and secondary school – the 5th Belgrade Grammar School. In 1995, he completed his undergraduate studies, while in 1998 he received his master's degree at the Faculty of Economics, University of Belgrade. During the undergraduate studies, Mali received the award as the student of the generation, and after completing his studies, he received the award for the best undergraduate dissertation.

He enrolled in doctoral studies in 2020, "Finance" study program, at the Technical University of Košice, Slovakia. In August 2022, he passed the dissertation exam, which approves the topic for his doctoral thesis. He obtained his doctorate in June 2023.

As a Ron Brown scholar, in 1999, he received his master's degree in finance (Master of Business Administration) from Washington University in St. Louis, United States of America. During the studies, Mali worked as an assistant on five courses in the field of business finance. After studying, Mali received the award as the best student in the field of finance, as well as the award for being among the top 10 students of the top 20 business schools in the United States that year.

== Business career ==
Prior to his political career, Mali was a financial adviser in the private sector. He worked in several private companies that were engaged in advising in the field of financial services. Between 1995 and 1997, Mali worked for Deloitte &Touche in Belgrade, and in its Prague office from 1999 to 2001. During his stay in the United States, he worked at Credit Suisse First Boston in the Mergers & Acquisitions Group in New York City.

In 2001, he was appointed the Assistant Minister of Privatisation in the Ministry of Economy and Privatisation. During his tenure, Mali was in charge of the execution of the privatisation process in the Republic of Serbia and preparation of the various laws in this field. At the end of that year, he moved to the Privatisation Agency, where he was the director of the Centre for Tender Privatisation. He remained in that position until the end of 2003.

From 2005 to 2008, Mali was the chairman of the real estate company "NCA Investment Group Doo Beograd".

Mali has served as a chairman of several boards of directors, including Fiat Automobil Srbija and Komercijalna banka, as well as chairman of the Supervisory Committee of Air Serbia. Additionally, he was a chairman of the Organising Committee of the 2017 European Athletics Indoor Championships in Belgrade and the 2018 EuroLeague Final Four.

He is the Chartered Financial Analyst (CFA) and member of CFA Institute, Serbian Business Angels Network, Fulbright Alumni Association of Serbia, British-Serbian Business Club, as well as a member of the Golf Club Belgrade and a holder of a golf green card. Also, he is the holder of the portfolio manager license, issued by the Serbian Securities Commission.

== Political career ==
In 2012, Mali was appointed the advisor for economic affairs to the First Deputy Prime Minister Aleksandar Vučić. A year later, Mali was appointed the Chief Negotiator with investors from the United Arab Emirates. He conducted negotiations on a strategic partnership between the then state-owned company JAT and Etihad Airways that resulted in the establishment of Air Serbia.

=== Mayor of Belgrade ===
Following the ousting of Mayor Dragan Đilas in November 2013, Mali was appointed the President of the Temporary Council of Belgrade. After the 2014 election in Belgrade, Mali was elected as a Mayor on the proposal of the winning Serbian Progressive Party.

From the very first moment of his appointment in 2014, Mali initiated a comprehensive financial consolidation program in order to achieve sustainable fiscal stabilisation. During his tenure as the Mayor of Belgrade, Mali managed to halve the debt of the city of Belgrade, which in 2014 amounted to 1.2 billion euros, and to reduce the budget deficit by four times. Mali conducted a debt consolidation of public utility companies, which in the first three years of his tenure resulted in the net profit of 9.5 billion dinars. He managed to galvanize a significant number of investments’ projects that contributed to low unemployment. The most significant is the new hub project “Belgrade Waterfront” (total worth 3.5 billion euros), the opening of the first IKEA store and Hilton Hotels & Resorts’ brand in Serbia, as well as the opening of the Chinese automotive parts factory MEI TA Europe Ltd. During Mali's tenure, Moody's Public Sector Europe (MPSE) upgraded the City of Belgrade's long-term issuer rating to Ba3 from B1; the rating's outlook has been changed to stable from positive.

Mali's tenure as the Mayor of Belgrade was marked by numerous significant infrastructure projects such as completion of the Pupin Bridge over the river Danube, Košare's heroes Boulevard, water factory "Makiš 2", as well as the complete reconstruction of Slavija Square, Boulevard of Liberation, Roosevelt Street and Mije Kovačević Street. The railway station "Belgrade Center" (Prokop) started to operate after 40 years. The projects of expansion of the pedestrian zone in the city of Belgrade and facade restoration were initiated. Agreements were signed for the construction of a waste processing plant in Vinča, wastewater treatment plants in Veliko Selo and for the construction of the Obrenovac - Novi Beograd heating plant.

=== Minister of Finance ===
On 29 May 2018, he was appointed the Minister of Finance of the Republic of Serbia in the cabinet of Ana Brnabić, after the resignation of Dušan Vujović three weeks earlier. Mali was elected four times as Minister of Finance, and currently holds the position of First Deputy Prime Minister, to which he was elected in May 2024. At the beginning of his tenure as the Minister of Finance, Mali has emphasised the two main goals; maintenance of the macroeconomic stability and achievement of the greater economic growth. In the first year of his tenure, the new set of laws has been passed with the aim to contribute to a better economic environment, reduce the tax burden on labour, incentive beginners in business, increase pensions and public sector salaries and the modernize Tax Administration.

During his mandate, Serbia became one of the fastest growing economies in Europe, unemployment is at a historically low level, and employment is at a historically high level. Serbia attracts a record number of foreign direct investments, and a number of reforms have been implemented to improve the economic environment, such as e-invoices, e-fiscalization, e-shipping forms. Thanks to good results, the Ministry of Finance during the corona virus pandemic helped the economy and citizens with a package of nine billion euros, which preserved the level of economic activity. Accordingly, the Ministry he leads is an investor in the construction project of the Expo complex and the National Stadium, and also leads the working group for the construction of the Belgrade metro, which began after several decades.

Mali led comprehensive fiscal reforms and strategic initiatives that resulted in Serbia achieving its first-ever investment-grade credit rating, improving fiscal discipline, managing public debt, and boosting investor confidence. Collaborated with international financial institutions and credit rating agencies to secure this historic milestone, enhancing the country's economic stability and global financial standing.

As Minister of Finance, he was appointed Governor of Serbia in the World Bank, European Bank for Reconstruction and the Asian Infrastructure Investment Bank. He is the President of the Coordination Body for the Prevention of Money Laundering and the Financing of Terrorism. He is also the President of the Coordination Body for the Suppression of the Gray Economy. He is a member of the Council for Economic Development.

Mali held the position of a member of the Presidency of the Serbian Progressive Party until November 2021, when he was elected as one of the vice presidents of the party.

== Corruption investigation ==
Mali's private business was being investigated by the Serbian Administration for the Prevention of Money Laundering (APML) in 2016. Earlier, during 2015, the Organized Crime and Corruption Reporting Project (OCCRP) and Serbian investigative journalism outlet KRIK discovered that Mali controls 42 bank accounts, registered under himself, his wife, and his three underage children. These accounts were holding sums of money far exceeding his official salary. In addition, OCCRP/KRIK discovered and reported his purchase of 24 apartments on Bulgarian Black Sea coast in 2012 and 2013. APML suspected Mali's accounts and apartment purchases as a money-laundering scheme and reported it to the Higher Public Prosecutor's Office in Belgrade. The prosecutors dismissed the case, as they did not find evidence of criminal activity and therefore rejected to launch an investigation. On 3 October 2021, when the Pandora Papers documents were released, it was confirmed that Mali "definitely owned 24 apartments in Bulgaria". The Pandora Papers discovered the missing link that Mali was indeed the owner of the two offshore companies that owned 24 apartments in Bulgaria. Mali responded by claiming that "it is a lie". The minister also stated that he does not own 24 apartments, but only one that is properly registered and where he has been vacationing with his family for ten years. The prosecution remained passive, however, and despite Mali's previous rejections of these accusations, Prime Minister Ana Brnabić claimed that this case does not constitute corruption as it occurred before he entered politics. Yet Mali was, indeed, a public official at that time and did not report the properties as obliged by law.

Three of Mali's children attended a private school where the tuition far exceeded Mali's official income. It was revealed that the tuition was paid by three offshore companies. One of the firms was owned by Mali but Mali said he did not know the owners of the other two companies.

== Plagiarism scandal ==
The Siniša Mali plagiarism scandal was a political scandal in Serbia which led to the University of Belgrade annulling the 2013 dissertation of economist and politician Siniša Mali in 2019. The process of establishing the initial claims took over five years, during which Mali progressed from the mayoralty of Belgrade to becoming the finance minister in the Serbian government, joining the ruling Serbian Progressive Party (SNS). After this scandal, Mali enrolled in doctoral studies at the Technical University of Košice, where he studied finance. In June 2023, he defended his PhD thesis whose objective was to study the existence and characteristics of the flypaper effect in Serbia.

Because of his personal connections with Aleksandar Vučić, his brother Andrej Vučić and Ana Brnabić, Mali was defended by the government and his party in what was described as an operation to "defend and protect plagiarism" with the whole "[political] machinery employed to defend the doctorate". The controversy triggered protests and public performances calling for the doctorate to be annulled, which ultimately blended into the wider civil and political Serbian protests since 2018. This was enhanced by the perception of his mayoralty of Belgrade, which was described as the "affair of all affairs". while Mali himself was labeled "controversial" and "scandal-ridden".

== Personal life ==
Mali is divorced and has four children.

Mali was awarded the "Best European 2014" award for the project of development and reconstruction of Belgrade. In 2017, the European Movement in B&H awarded him the "Most Tolerant City in the Region" award. Also, Siniša Mali is the Reformer of the Year for 2022.

Mali is a keen sportsman and a regular participant in marathon races. In November 2018 he ran the full Athens Marathon and in September of the next year Mali ran a full marathon in Berlin. He ran a full marathon in Boston, New York, Chicago, London, and Tokyo. By finishing the Tokyo Marathon in March 2023, Sinisa Mali earned the Six Star Medal award.

He was a member of the presidency of KK Crvena zvezda and he is the honorary holder of a black belt in taekwondo 5th dan for contribution to the development of sports. During his high school days, Mali played guitar in a heavy metal band.

He was awarded the Order of the Great Martyrs of Kragujevac of the first degree. It was handed to him with the blessing of the Serbian Patriarch Irinej, in October 2019, by Bishop of the Diocese of Šumadija, Jovan.

Mali was awarded the highest honor of the City of Kruševac, the 2024 Vidovdan Award, for his outstanding contribution to the economic and social development of the Republic of Serbia and the City of Kruševac.

Political offices
Preceded by Dušan Vujović; Ana Brnabić (Acting)	Minister of Finance of Serbia; 2018–present	Incumbent
Preceded by Dragan Đilas	Mayor of Belgrade; 2013–2018	Succeeded by Andreja Mladenović (Acting); Zoran Radojičić
