= Anđelka Atanasković =

Serbian mechanical engineer and politician

- Анђелка Атанасковић
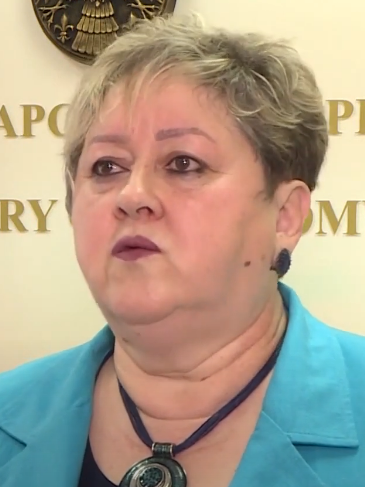
- Atanasković in 2022

Minister of Economy
- In office 28 October 2020 – 26 October 2022
- Prime Minister: Ana Brnabić
- Preceded by: Goran Knežević
- Succeeded by: Rade Basta

Personal details
- Born: 1958 (age 67–68) Trstenik, PR Serbia, FPR Yugoslavia
- Party: SRS (2004–2008); SNS (2008–present)
- Education: University of Belgrade
- Profession: Mechanical engineer

Anđelka Atanasković (Serbian Cyrillic: Анђелка Атанасковић; born 1958) is a Serbian mechanical engineer and politician who served as minister of economy from 2020 to 2022. A member of the Serbian Progressive Party (SNS), she previously served as a director of a local Trstenik company from 2014 to 2020.

== Biography ==
=== Early life and career ===
She was born in 1958 in Trstenik. There she finished elementary school and technical high school. She graduated in 1982 from the Faculty of Mechanical Engineering at the University of Belgrade (department in Kraljevo). Immediately after graduating, she got a job in the factory "Prva petoletka - namenska". "She learned her craft in machine technology, then she was the director of control.

In 2014, she was appointed to the position of General Manager of this company, where she strengthened business policy, improved professional staff, procured new machines and equipment in the production process and expanded the foreign market. With all these moves, she saved the company that was about to close, and otherwise it was considered the giant of the Trstenik area for years. In 2018, she started working on the reopening of the former "Petoletka's" plant in Leposavić.

She was named the best manager of Southeast Europe in 2016, Woman of the Year in the region, and she received numerous awards from regional and national chambers of commerce.

=== Politics ===
From 2004 to 2008, she was a member of the far-right Serbian Radical Party and a member of the local parliament. Then she joined the Serbian Progressive Party. In 2016, she was re-elected as a councilor and held that position until 2020, when she took office of the Minister of Economy in the Government of Serbia.
