= Adrijana Mesarović =

Serbian politician (born 1981)

- Адријана Месаровић
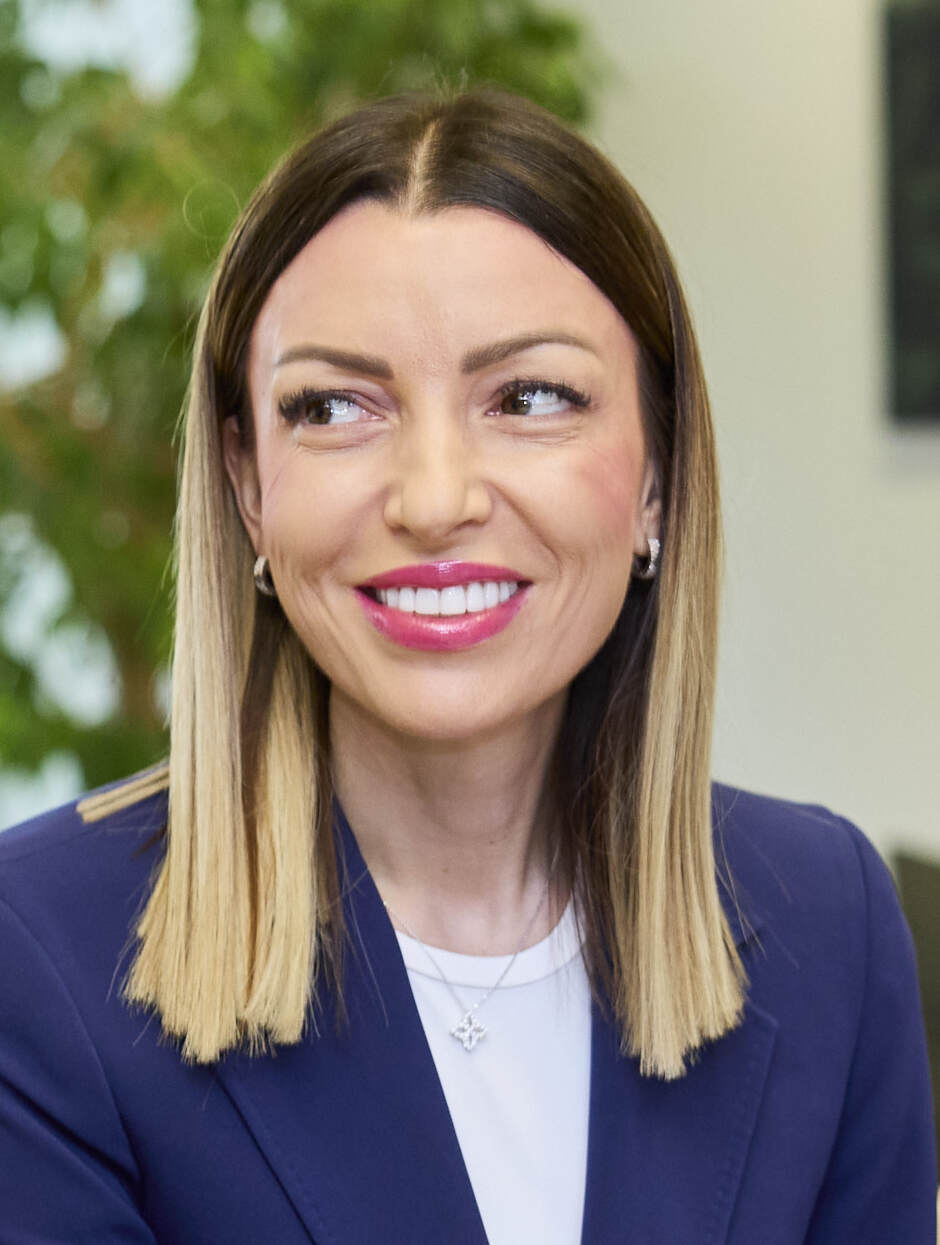
- Adrijana Mesarović in 2026

Deputy Prime Minister of Serbia
- Incumbent
- Assumed office 16 April 2025
- Prime Minister: Đuro Macut

Minister of Economy
- Incumbent
- Assumed office 2 May 2024
- Prime Minister: Miloš Vučević Đuro Macut
- Preceded by: Slobodan Cvetković

Minister of Internal and Foreign Trade (acting)
- In office 25 November 2024 – 16 April 2025
- Prime Minister: Miloš Vučević
- Preceded by: Tomislav Momirović
- Succeeded by: Jagoda Lazarević

Personal details
- Born: 10 December 1981 (age 44) Novi Sad, SR Serbia, SFR Yugoslavia
- Party: SNS
- Education: University of Novi Sad (MAecon); University of Southampton (SpecIT)
- Occupation: Politician

Adrijana Mesarović (Serbian Cyrillic: Адријана Месаровић; born 10 December 1981) is a Serbian politician, economist and local government activist. A member of the Serbian Progressive Party (SNS), she has served as minister of economy since May 2024 and deputy prime minister of Serbia since April 2025.

== Biography ==
Mesarović was born on 10 December 1981 in Novi Sad. Mesarović was educated in her hometown of Novi Sad, obtaining a master's degree in economics. She was also educated in Southampton, UK, where she completed several specialized training courses in computer science. She worked in the family business, and since 2008 she has been associated with the banking sector. She has been a member of the Serbian Progressive Party. In 2018, she joined the municipal executive in Novi Sad. As an executive member of city of Novi Sad she has participated in the implementation of the national "Serbia 2025" program and the construction of a bypass bridge around the city in addition to the reconstruction of SPC Vojvodina. In 2020, Mesarović was appointed to the Novi Sad city council, where she was entrusted with budget, finance and investment matters.

In November 2024 she was appointed acting Minister of Internal and Foreign Trade after the resignation of Tomislav Momirović. In May 2024, she took office as Minister of Economy in the cabinet of Miloš Vučević. She has stated she is emphasizing micro, small, and medium-sized businesses as the ministry's focus and that she wished to develop the infrastructure of the state. She declared that her intent is for Serbia to become a leader in the region when it comes to FDI. Mesarović has also criticized the ongoing protests against corruption, and that she would always strongly support Vučić.

== Personal life ==
She owns a one-and-a-half room flat in Novi Sad and in Belgrade owns a two-room flat additionally.
