= Goran Knežević =

Serbian basketball player and politician

- Горан Кнежевић
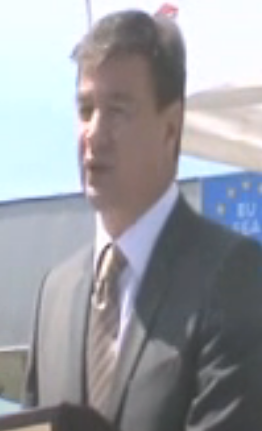
- Knežević in May 2013

Minister of Economy
- In office 11 August 2016 – 28 October 2020
- Prime Minister: Aleksandar Vučić; Ivica Dačić (Acting); Ana Brnabić
- Preceded by: Željko Sertić
- Succeeded by: Anđelka Atanasković

Minister of Agriculture, Forestry and Water Management
- In office 27 July 2012 – 2 September 2013
- Prime Minister: Aleksandar Vučić
- Preceded by: Dušan Petrović
- Succeeded by: Dragan Glamočić

Mayor of Zrenjanin
- In office 6 July 2012 – 26 July 2012
- Preceded by: Mileta Mihajlov
- Succeeded by: Ivan Bošnjak
- In office 2004–2009
- Preceded by: Milan Čežek
- Succeeded by: Mileta Mihajlov

Personal details
- Born: 12 May 1957 (age 69) Banatski Karlovac, PR Serbia, FPR Yugoslavia
- Party: Democratic Party (1991–2008); Serbian Progressive Party (2010–)
- Relations: Vuksan Knežević (father)
- Education: University of Belgrade
- Occupation: Politician
- Basketball career

Career history
- 1978–1980: Partizan
- ?: Vojvodina
- ?: Proleter

Career highlights
- FIBA Korać Cup winner (1979); Yugoslav League champion (1979); Yugoslav Cup winner (1979)

Goran Knežević (Serbian Cyrillic: Горан Кнежевић, pronounced [ɡǒran kněːʒeʋitɕ]; born 12 May 1957) is a Serbian politician and former professional basketball player. His father is Vuksan Knežević (b. 1931), former Yugoslav political dissident and writer who was sent to prison camp Goli Otok at the age of 17. He served as the Minister of Economy of Serbia from 2016 to 2020.

He previously served as Minister of Agriculture, Forestry and Water Management from 2012 to 2013. He also served as the mayor of Zrenjanin from 2004 to 2009 and shortly in 2012.

== Early years and education ==
He was born in Banatski Karlovac, Serbia. He graduated from the University of Belgrade with a diploma in economics.

== Basketball career ==
Knežević used to be a basketball player in Partizan from Belgrade, Vojvodina from Novi Sad and Proleter from Zrenjanin. During 1978–79 season he won Yugoslav First Federal League, Yugoslav Cup and FIBA Korać Cup with Partizan.

Also, he used to be a president of Basketball Federation of Serbia and Montenegro during a short period between 2005 and 2006.

== Political career ==
Knežević became mayor of Zrenjanin municipality in 2004, and was re-elected in 2008.

On 1 October 2008 Knežević was interrogated by Serbian police on suspicion that he was involved in "construction mafia" - helping individuals from organized crime circles launder money by investing it in construction and real-estate development.

On 1 April 2009 the DS Mayor was charged with Abuse of Office. The Special Prosecution states that the Zrenjanin municipal budget suffered damages to the amount of EUR 1.6mn, as a result.

On 23 April 2009 he was dismissed as a Mayor, since he was in custody since 1 October 2008. He was released from custody on 4 November 2009.

On 11 August 2016, Knežević took the office of the Minister of Economy of Serbia, replacing Željko Sertić on that position.

In February 2017, the Prime Minister of Serbia Aleksandar Vučić decided to run for the 2017 Serbian presidential elections. He won the elections in the first round and was sworn as the President of Serbia on 31 May 2017. Weeks later, he gave mandate to Ana Brnabić to form the governmental cabinet. On 29 June 2017, the cabinet of Ana Brnabić was formed, with Knežević keeping his office.

Political offices
Preceded by Dušan Petrović	Minister of Agriculture, Forestry and Water Management of Serbia; 2012–2013	Succeeded by Dragan Glamočić
Preceded by Željko Sertić	Minister of Economy of Serbia; 2016–2020	Succeeded by Anđelka Atanasković
Sporting positions
Preceded by Miodrag Babić	President of the Basketball Federation of Serbia and Montenegro; 2005–2007	Succeeded by Dragan Kapičić
