= Lazar Krstić =

Serbian economist and politician

- Лазар Крстић
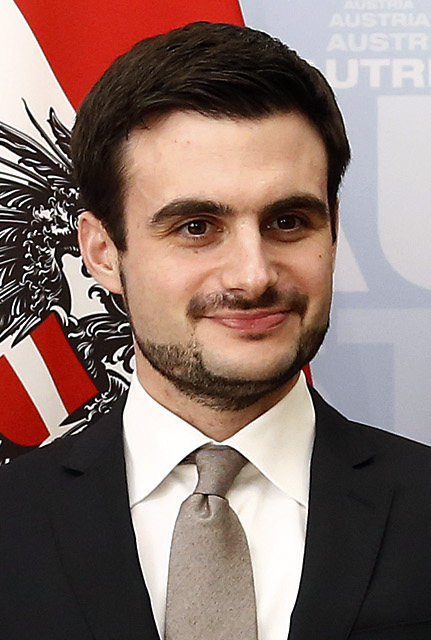
- Krstić in June 2014

Minister of Finance
- In office 26 August 2013 – 12 July 2014
- Prime Minister: Ivica Dačić; Aleksandar Vučić
- Preceded by: Mlađan Dinkić
- Succeeded by: Dušan Vujović

Personal details
- Born: 1984 (age 41–42) Niš, Yugoslavia (now Serbia)
- Party: Independent
- Education: Yale University
- Profession: Consultant

Lazar Krstić (Serbian Cyrillic: Лазар Крстић; born 1984) is a Serbian consultant. He served as the Minister of Finance in the Government of Serbia from 2013 to 2014.

== Education and early career ==
Krstić was born in Niš in 1984. He graduated from Yale University. After studies he worked for international management consulting firm McKinsey & Company.

== Political career ==
Krstić was appointed the Minister of Finance in the Government of Serbia on 26 August 2013, on the proposal of ruling Serbian Progressive Party. On 12 July 2014, he resigned from the position due to disagreements with Prime Minister of Serbia Aleksandar Vučić over the level of public sector salaries and pension reduction. During his tenure, he pushed for economic reforms, huge salaries and pension reduction, electricity price increase and other taxes for citizens.

== Life after government duties ==
After leaving his government duties, he returned to his previous firm McKinsey & Company as a consultant, and has since then been based in Geneva, Switzerland.

Political offices
Preceded by Mlađan Dinkić	Minister of Finance of Serbia; 2013–2014	Succeeded by Dušan Vujović
