= Tamara Stojčević =

Serbian politician (born 1966)

- Тамара Стојчевић

Secretary-General of the Government of Serbia
- In office 7 July 2008 – 27 July 2012
- Prime Minister: Mirko Cvetković
- Preceded by: Dejan Mihajlov
- Succeeded by: Veljko Odalović

Personal details
- Born: 23 May 1966 (age 60) Belgrade, SFR Yugoslavia
- Education: University of Belgrade
- Occupation: Politician
- Profession: Lawyer

Tamara Stojčević (Serbian Cyrillic: Тамара Стојчевић, born 23 May 1966) is a Serbian lawyer and politician. She served as the Secretary-General of the Government of Serbia from 2008 to 2012.

== Education and career ==
She graduated from the University of Belgrade's Law School. She passed the bar examination in 1993.

She held several posts in the Belgrade City Assembly. She worked as a lawyer, deputy secretary, secretary of the Vračar municipal assembly and advisor to the secretary of this municipal assembly. She was deputy secretary of the Belgrade City Assembly and then the secretary, and from 2004 the head of the city administration.

From 2002 to 2004, she was deputy member of the Serbian Electoral Commission, and from 2001 to 2005 deputy secretary of the Belgrade City Electoral Commission. Between 1999 and 2002 she held the position of secretary of the Municipal Electoral Commission of the Vracar municipality.

In 2007 she was elected the secretary of the National Assembly of Serbia, and on 8 July 2008 she was appointed as the Secretary-General of the Government of Serbia. She stayed on that position until 27 July 2012.
