= Rade Basta =

Serbian politician

- Раде Баста
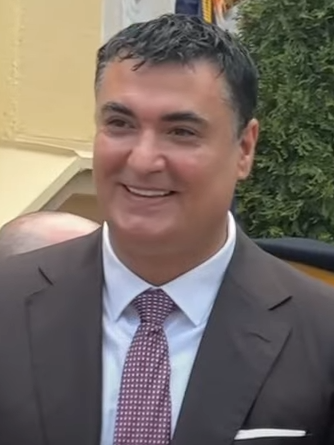
- Basta in 2023

Minister of Economy
- In office 26 October 2022 – 22 June 2023 (Note: Siniša Mali took over his function on 22 June 2023, however the National Assembly dismissed him on 11 July 2023)
- Prime Minister: Ana Brnabić
- Preceded by: Anđelka Atanasković
- Succeeded by: Siniša Mali (acting); Slobodan Cvetković

Member of the National Assembly
- In office 1 August 2022 – 25 October 2022

Personal details
- Born: 21 February 1979 (age 47) Novi Sad, SR Serbia, SFR Yugoslavia
- Party: JS (until 2023); PEP (since 2023)
- Education: University of Novi Sad; University of the Academy of Commerce
- Occupation: Politician

Military service
- Allegiance: FR Yugoslavia
- Branch/service: Army of FR Yugoslavia
- Years of service: 1998–1999
- Battles/wars: Kosovo War

Rade Basta (Serbian Cyrillic: Раде Баста; born 21 February 1979) is a Serbian politician who served as minister of economy from 2022 to 2023. A former member of United Serbia (JS), he served as a member of the National Assembly of Serbia from August to October 2022.

Born in Novi Sad, he graduated from the University of Novi Sad in 2002. He was an advisor to Srđan Kružević during his tenure as the director of Elektrovojvodina, a deputy provincial secretary for energy, and briefly a member of the City Assembly of Novi Sad in 2016. As of 2018, he has been the president of Belgrade Power Plants, a public communal company. He was an associate during Goran Vesić's tenure as deputy mayor of Belgrade. He is a supporter of nuclear power while he also argued that Serbia should establish a scientific-research center for nuclear technologies with the United States and European Union, and that Serbia should build a nuclear power plant.

Basta was appointed minister of economy in the third cabinet of Ana Brnabić in October 2022. Since then, Basta has openly supported introducing sanctions against Russia, which was met with backlash from JS and the Socialist Party of Serbia, and has supported the mass protests that began in May 2023. He was dismissed from JS and the government in June 2023. Soon after, he formed the European Way Movement.

== Early life ==
Basta was born on 21 February 1979 in Novi Sad, Socialist Republic of Serbia, Socialist Federal Republic of Yugoslavia. He fought in the Kosovo War. He finished his secondary education at a school in Sremska Kamenica, graduated from the University of Novi Sad in 2002, and earned his master's degree from the University of the Academy of Commerce in Novi Sad in 2012.

== Career ==
He began his career as a worker at the Ministry of Internal Affairs in 1998; he worked there until 2005. Basta worked as an adviser to Srđan Kružević, a former United Serbia (JS) member, when Kružević was the director of Elektrovojvodina. Basta was later appointed deputy provincial secretary for energy in July 2016. He was elected member of the City Assembly of Novi Sad in 2016 but resigned shortly afterwards. At the end of 2016, he was appointed president of the JS branch in Vojvodina. In September 2018, he became the president of the Belgrade Power Plants, a public communal company. He served as deputy president of the JS, until his dismissal on 10 June 2023.

Marko Bastać, then a member of the Party of Freedom and Justice (SSP), accused Basta of leading security guards that allegedly beat a group of people after the promotion of Goran Vesić's book in October 2019. During Vesić's tenure as deputy mayor of Belgrade, Basta served as his associate. Basta was elected to the City Assembly of Belgrade after the 2022 Belgrade City Assembly election, although he resigned shortly after. He was elected to the National Assembly of Serbia after the snap 2022 Serbian parliamentary election. As a member of the JS parliamentary group, he served as a member of the committee on defence an internal affairs and committee for agriculture, forestry, and water management; he was also a deputy member of the committee for finance, republic budget, and control of spending of public funds. He resigned from his position as a member of the National Assembly on 25 October 2022.

Following his dismissal from JS, he formed the European Way Movement (PEP), which according to him would advocate for faster accession of Serbia to the European Union. PEP would also take part in the upcoming parliamentary election.

== Minister of Economy ==
Initially speculated to be appointed as a Minister of Agriculture, Forestry and Water economy, it was announced on 23 October 2022 that he would serve as a minister of economy instead. He was sworn in on 26 October, succeeding Anđelka Atanasković.

Dragan Marković, the leader of JS, and Ivica Dačić, the leader of the Socialist Party of Serbia submitted a proposal to dismiss Basta from the government on 22 June due to his support for introducing sanctions against Russia. Siniša Mali took over his function on the same day, while the National Assembly dismissed him on 11 July.

== Political positions ==
Basta is a supporter of nuclear power and argued that Serbia should build a nuclear power plant to ensure a stable supply of electricity. He also proposed that the government of Serbia should establish the National Corporation for Atomic Energy. He also stated that the Serbian-Russian Humanitarian Center in Niš should be abolished, and that Serbia needs to open a scientific-research center for nuclear technologies with the United States and European Union. He has supported the mass protests that began in May 2023.

Basta supports sanctioning Russia due to their invasion of Ukraine and he has been vocally supportive of Ukraine. This prompted reaction from JS, which is opposed to introducing sanctions.

== Personal life ==
By profession, Basta claims to be an economist. He was formerly a kickboxer, a policeman, and a professor of physical education. He received the "Captain Miša Anastasijević" award in December 2012 for his contribution to the development of entrepreneurship and social creativity. He served as the director of FK Radnički Niš from December 2016 to November 2017. He resides in Belgrade.
