= Third cabinet of Ana Brnabić =

2022–2024 cabinet of Serbia

3rd cabinet of Ana Brnabić
- Government of Serbia
- 2022–2024
- Date formed: 26 October 2022
- Date dissolved: 2 May 2024

People and organisations
- President: Aleksandar Vučić
- Prime Minister: Ana Brnabić (until 20 March 2024); Ivica Dačić (since 20 March 2024)
- Deputy Prime Ministers: Ivica Dačić, Maja Gojković, Miloš Vučević, Siniša Mali
- No. of ministers: 25 (Note: Excluding ministers without portfolio, deputy prime ministers, and the prime minister); 28 (Note: Excluding deputy prime ministers and the prime minister)
- Total no. of members: 29 (Note: Including ministers without portfolio, deputy prime ministers, and the prime minister)
- Member parties: SNS; SPS; DSHV; PUPS; SDPS; SPP; JS (until 2023)
- Status in legislature: Coalition government

History
- Election: 2022 general election
- Legislature term: 13th convocation of the National Assembly
- Budget: 2023, 2024
- Incoming formation: 2022 government formation
- Predecessor: Brnabić II
- Successor: Vučević I

The third cabinet of Ana Brnabić was formed on 26 October 2022, following the latter's election as Prime Minister of Serbia by the National Assembly on the same day. It succeeded the second cabinet of Ana Brnabić.

The Serbian Progressive Party (SNS) came to power in 2012. Brnabić was appointed prime minister by Aleksandar Vučić, the president of Serbia, in June 2017 and was elected shortly afterwards by the National Assembly. Initially an independent politician, she joined SNS in 2019; she was re-elected after the 2020 Serbian parliamentary election. After the snap 2022 parliamentary election, Vučić gave Brnabić another mandate to form a government and stated that she would serve for two years, instead of a regular four-year mandate. With the dissolution of the National Assembly on 1 November 2023, Brnabić's cabinet entered in acting capacity. As first deputy prime minister, Dačić took over the capacity of acting prime minister following Brnabić's election as president of the National Assembly in March 2024.

The cabinet was composed of members of SNS, Socialist Party of Serbia (SPS), Democratic Alliance of Croats in Vojvodina (DSHV), Party of United Pensioners of Serbia (PUPS), Social Democratic Party of Serbia (SDPS), and Justice and Reconciliation Party (SPP). The Alliance of Vojvodina Hungarians (VMSZ) serves as confidence and supply for the government. With 29 ministers in total, it was the largest amount of ministers of any post-Milošević government. It was succeeded by the cabinet of Miloš Vučević on 2 May 2024.

== Background ==
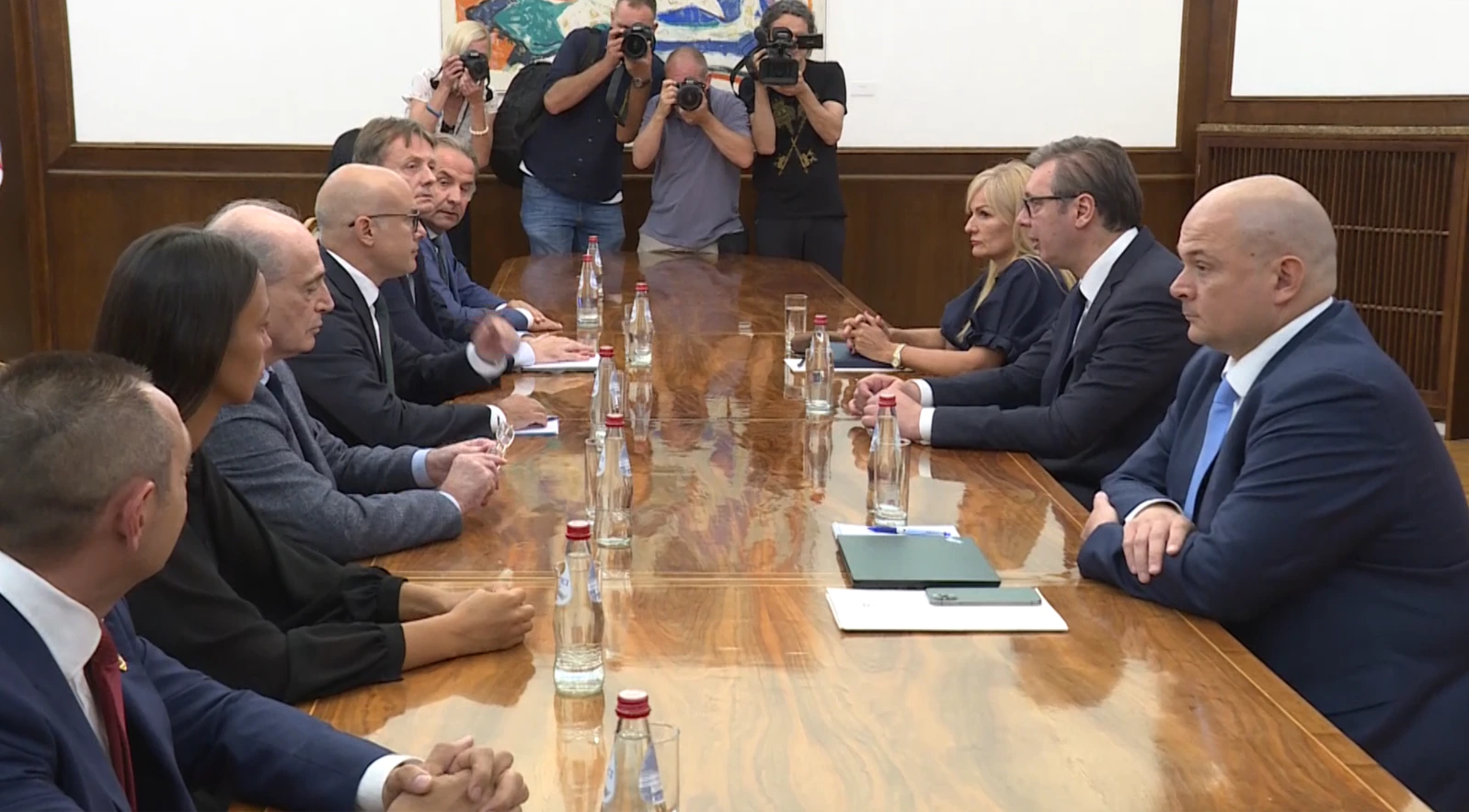
Consultations on the formation of the government in July 2022

The Serbian Progressive Party (SNS) came to power after the 2012 parliamentary election, along with the Socialist Party of Serbia (SPS). Ana Brnabić, an independent politician, was appointed prime minister by Aleksandar Vučić, who served as prime minister up until the April 2017 presidential election in June 2017, and was elected prime minister by the National Assembly in the same month. Brnabić joined SNS in 2019, and was re-elected as prime minister after the 2020 parliamentary election.

SNS placed first in the snap 2022 parliamentary election, although it lost its parliamentary majority. Shortly after the election, Vučić announced that consultations regarding the formation of the government would begin. The consultations lasted between 14 and 18 July. Brnabić was given the mandate to form a new government on 27 August. Additionally, Vučić also announced that Brnabić would head the government for two years, instead of a regular four-year mandate.

== Investiture ==
The investiture vote occurred on 26 October 2022. The Alliance of Vojvodina Hungarians (VMSZ), although not a part of the cabinet, announced in the National Assembly that it would serve as confidence and supply for the government.

Investiture; Ana Brnabić (SNS)
Ballot →	26 October 2022
Required majority →	126 out of 250
Yes	157 / 250
No	68 / 250
Abstentions	0 / 250
Absentees	25 / 250

=== Supporting parties ===
Party	Main ideology	Political position	Leader
Government parties
Serbian Progressive Party (SNS)	Populism	Big tent	Aleksandar Vučić (until 27 May 2023); Miloš Vučević (since 27 May 2023)
Socialist Party of Serbia (SPS)	Social democracy	Centre-left	Ivica Dačić
Democratic Alliance of Croats in Vojvodina (DSHV)	Croat minority interests	Centre	Tomislav Žigmanov
Party of United Pensioners of Serbia (PUPS)	Pensioners' interests	Centre	Milan Krkobabić
Social Democratic Party of Serbia (SDPS)	Social democracy	Centre-left	Rasim Ljajić
Justice and Reconciliation Party (SPP)	Bosniak minority interests	Centre-right	Usame Zukorlić
Confidence and supply
United Serbia (JS)	National conservatism	Right-wing	Dragan Marković
Alliance of Vojvodina Hungarians (VMSZ)	Hungarian minority interests	Centre-right	István Pásztor

== Composition ==
The third cabinet of Ana Brnabić is composed of 25 ministries. It has the largest amount of ministers of any post-Milošević government.

Portfolio	Name	Party	Took office	Left office	Ref(s)
Prime Minister	Ana Brnabić	SNS	26 October 2022	20 March 2024	
Prime Minister	Ivica Dačić	SPS	20 March 2024	2 May 2024	
Deputy Prime Ministers	Ivica Dačić	SPS	26 October 2022	2 May 2024	
Deputy Prime Ministers	Maja Gojković	SNS	26 October 2022	2 May 2024	
Deputy Prime Ministers	Miloš Vučević	SNS	26 October 2022	2 May 2024	
Deputy Prime Ministers	Siniša Mali	SNS	26 October 2022	2 May 2024	
Minister of Finance	Siniša Mali	SNS	26 October 2022	2 May 2024	
Minister of Economy	Rade Basta	JS	26 October 2022	10 June 2023	
Minister of Economy	Rade Basta	PEP	10 June 2023	22 June 2023	
Minister of Economy	Siniša Mali	SNS	22 June 2023	6 September 2023	
Minister of Economy	Slobodan Cvetković	SPS	6 September 2023	2 May 2024	
Minister of Agriculture, Forestry, and Water Management	Jelena Tanasković	Independent	26 October 2022	2 May 2024	
Minister of Environmental Protection	Irena Vujović	SNS	26 October 2022	2 May 2024	
Minister of Construction, Transport, and Infrastructure	Goran Vesić	SNS	26 October 2022	2 May 2024	
Minister of Mining and Energy	Dubravka Đedović	Independent	26 October 2022	2 May 2024	
Minister of Internal and Foreign Trade	Tomislav Momirović	SNS	26 October 2022	2 May 2024	
Minister of Justice	Maja Popović	Independent	26 October 2022	2 May 2024	
Minister of State Administration and Local Self-Government	Aleksandar Martinović	SNS	26 October 2022	2 May 2024	
Minister of Human and Minority Rights and Social Dialogue	Tomislav Žigmanov	DSHV	26 October 2022	2 May 2024	
Minister of Internal Affairs	Bratislav Gašić	SNS	26 October 2022	2 May 2024	
Minister of Defence	Miloš Vučević	SNS	26 October 2022	2 May 2024	
Minister of Foreign Affairs	Ivica Dačić	SPS	26 October 2022	2 May 2024	
Minister of European Integration	Tanja Miščević	Independent	26 October 2022	2 May 2024	
Minister of Education	Branko Ružić	SPS	26 October 2022	29 May 2023	
Minister of Education	Đorđe Milićević	SPS	31 May 2023	25 July 2023	
Minister of Education	Slavica Đukić Dejanović	SPS	25 July 2023	2 May 2024	
Minister of Health	Danica Grujičić	Independent	26 October 2022	2 May 2024	
Minister of Labour, Employment, Veteran and Social Policy	Nikola Selaković	SNS	26 October 2022	2 May 2024	
Minister of Family Welfare and Demography	Darija Kisić	SNS	26 October 2022	2 May 2024	
Minister of Sports	Zoran Gajić	Independent	26 October 2022	2 May 2024	
Minister of Culture	Maja Gojković	SNS	26 October 2022	2 May 2024	
Minister of Rural Welfare	Milan Krkobabić	PUPS	26 October 2022	2 May 2024	
Minister of Science, Technological Development, and Innovation	Jelena Begović	Independent	26 October 2022	2 May 2024	
Minister of Tourism and Youth	Husein Memić	SDPS	26 October 2022	2 May 2024	
Minister of Information and Telecommunications	Mihailo Jovanović	Independent	26 October 2022	2 May 2024	
Minister for Public Investments	Marko Blagojević	Independent	26 October 2022	2 May 2024	
Ministers without portfolio	Novica Tončev	SPS	26 October 2022	2 May 2024	
Ministers without portfolio	Đorđe Milićević	SPS	26 October 2022	2 May 2024	
Ministers without portfolio	Edin Đerlek	SPP	26 October 2022	2 May 2024	

== Timeline ==
=== 2022 ===
The National Assembly adopted the Law on Ministries on 21 October 2022, which set the basis of the incoming 25 ministries of the third cabinet of Ana Brnabić. 150 MPs voted in favour of the law. The composition of the government was revealed by Aleksandar Vučić following a meeting at the SNS headquarters on 23 October 2022. The Belgrade Centre for Security Policy (BCSP) noted that "those who were seen as pro-Russian... were cut off" although that Zorana Mihajlović, who was seen as pro-Western, was also dismissed, with BCSP claiming that it is related to "some concessions of the conservative part of SNS"; nevertheless, BCSP claimed that the government would not abandon "continuity" regarding foreign policy. Bojan Klačar of CeSID noted that "with the entering of Tanja Miščević into the government, it is a sign that European Integrations could be more in focus than before". Brnabić stated that "the government would be not pro-Western nor pro-Russian, and it would rather fight for its national interests". The cabinet was elected and sworn in on 26 October 2022. The government proposed the budget for year 2023 in November 2022 and the National Assembly adopted it on 9 December 2022, with 156 votes in favour.

=== 2023 ===
Following the Belgrade school shooting, which occurred on 3 May, Ružić received criticism after claiming that "the cancerous, pernicious influence of Internet video games, so-called Western values, is evident in the shooting". Opposition parties called for his resignation, including the Independent Union of Educators of Serbia. He announced his resignation on 7 May and was dismissed from the position on 29 May. Đorđe Milićević was appointed as acting minister of education on 31 May. The government proposed Slavica Đukić Dejanović as Ružić's successor on 13 June and was elected by the National Assembly on 25 July.

The United Serbia (JS), led by Dragan Marković, dismissed Rade Basta from the party due to his support for sanctioning Russia and him "being diametrically opposed to the JS program and the state and national policy implement by the government of Serbia" on 10 June 2023. Basta formed the European Way Movement (PEP) on the same day. Marković also told Basta to resign from his position as minister of economy, although he refused to; SPS and JS then submitted a proposal to dismiss Basta from the government on 22 June. Siniša Mali took over the functions of the ministry, while the National Assembly dismissed Basta on 11 July. Slobodan Cvetković was proposed as Basta's successor on 26 July. Cvetković was elected on 6 September 2023.

Dismissal of Rade Basta (PEP)
Ballot →	11 July 2023
Required majority →	126 out of 250
Yes	149 / 250
No	0 / 250
Abstentions	45 / 250
Absentees	56 / 250

In July 2023, there was an unsuccessful motion of no confidence to dismiss Bratislav Gašić. The motion was initiated by 61 opposition MPs after the Belgrade school shooting and Mladenovac and Smederevo shootings and as one of the demands of the Serbia Against Violence protests.

Motion of no confidence Bratislav Gašić (SNS)
Ballot →	5 July 2023
Required majority →	126 out of 250
Yes	37 / 250
No	148 / 250
Abstentions	11 / 250
Absentees	54 / 250

The budget for the year 2024 was adopted by the National Assembly on 26 October. With the dissolution of the National Assembly and the scheduling of the 2023 Serbian parliamentary election on 1 November 2023, Brnabić's cabinet entered in acting capacity.

=== 2024 ===
Ivica Dačić became the acting prime minister on 20 March, when Brnabić was elected president of the National Assembly.
