= Slobodan Cvetković =

Serbian politician (born 1974)

- Слободан Цветковић

Minister of Economy
- In office 6 September 2023 – 2 May 2024
- Prime Minister: Ana Brnabić
- Preceded by: Rade Basta; Siniša Mali (acting)
- Succeeded by: Adrijana Mesarović

Personal details
- Born: 28 June 1974 (age 52) Novi Sad, SR Serbia, SFR Yugoslavia
- Party: SPS (2007–present)
- Education: University "Braća Karić"
- Occupation: Politician

Slobodan Cvetković (Serbian: Слободан Цветковић; born 28 June 1974) is a Serbian politician who served as minister of economy from 2023 to 2024. A member of the Socialist Party of Serbia (SPS), he previously held high-ranking positions inside the SPS branch in Vojvodina.

== Early life ==
Slobodan Cvetković was born on 28 June 1974 in Novi Sad, Socialist Republic of Serbia, Socialist Federal Republic of Yugoslavia. He was educated in his hometown; he earned his master's degree at the University "Braća Karić", a university owned by businessmen Bogoljub Karić and Dragomir Karić. After earning his master's degree, Cvetković began working at the Faculty of Enterprising Management of the University "Braća Karić".

== Career ==
Cvetković previously served as director of "Sport Centre" in Beočin and as the assistant provincial secretary for Culture and Public Information in the government of Vojvodina. In 2014, he was appointed director of the Novi Sad Fair and he served in that role until his appointment in the government of Serbia in 2023. The Anti-Corruption Agency reported that Cvetković's monthly earning for that role was RSD 235,000.

Cvetković joined the Socialist Party of Serbia (SPS) in 2007 and became a member of its provincial branch in 2011. In 2012, he was elected president of the SPS board in Novi Sad. He also served as a member of the executive board of the main board and executive board of the provincial board of SPS.

He is a staunch supporter of the current president of SPS, Ivica Dačić.

== Minister of Economy ==
The government of Serbia presented Cvetković to the National Assembly of Serbia as a candidate for the minister of economy in July 2023. The position was previously held by Rade Basta until he was dismissed in June 2023. Basta was then succeeded by Siniša Mali who served in the acting capacity. Cvetković was elected by the National Assembly on 6 September with 148 votes in favour. Opposition parties did not vote in Cvetković's election; they also criticised his appointment due to not having previous experience in the area of economics. He was succeeded by Adrijana Mesarović on 2 May 2024.

== Personal life ==
Cvetković has stated in his biography that he was previously a kayaker. Alongside his native Serbian, he also speaks English.
