= Ministry of Industry (Serbia) =

Serbian Government ministry, 1991–2001

- Министарство индустрије Ministarstvo industrije

Ministry overview
- Formed: 11 February 1991
- Dissolved: 25 January 2001
- Superseding Ministry: Ministry of Finance
- Jurisdiction: Government of Serbia

The Ministry of Industry of the Republic of Serbia (Serbian: Министарство индустрије / Ministarstvo industrije) was the ministry in the Government of Serbia. The ministry was merged into the Ministry of Finance on 25 January 2001.

== List of ministers ==
Minister	Image	Party	Term start	Term end	Lifespan
Duško Matković		Socialist Party of Serbia (SPS)	11 February 1991	23 December 1991	1956–
Velimir Mihajlović		Socialist Party of Serbia (SPS)	23 December 1991	10 February 1993	
Momir Pavličević		Socialist Party of Serbia (SPS)	10 February 1993	18 March 1994	1940–
Oskar Fodor		Socialist Party of Serbia (SPS)	18 March 1994	11 February 1997	
Života Ćosić		Socialist Party of Serbia (SPS)	11 February 1997	24 March 1998	1942–
Luka Mitrović		Serbian Radical Party (SRS)	24 March 1998	24 October 2000	1951–
Veroljub Stevanović		Serbian Renewal Movement (SPO)	24 October 2000	25 January 2001	1946–

== See also ==
- Ministry of Economy
