= Ministry of Economy (Serbia) =

Government ministry of Serbia

- Министарство привреде Ministarstvo privrede

Ministry overview
- Formed: 3 March 2004; 22 years ago
- Preceding Ministry: Ministry of Privatization and Economic Reconstruction
- Jurisdiction: Government of Serbia
- Headquarters: Kneza Miloša Street 20, Belgrade
- Minister responsible: Adrijana Mesarović
- Website: privreda.gov.rs

The Ministry of Economy (Serbian: Министарство привреде, romanized: Ministarstvo privrede) is a ministry in the Government of Serbia which is in the charge of industrial policy and investments. The current minister is Adrijana Mesarović, in office since 2 May 2024.

== History ==
The Ministry of Economy was established on 3 March 2004 after the dissolution of the Ministry of Privatization and Economic Reconstruction which existed from 1991 to 2004. The Ministry of Foreign Economic Relations which existed from 1991 to 2007, merged into the Ministry of Economy and Regional Development in 2007. Over the years, it has changed many secondary areas of its jurisdiction. Regional development was added in 2007, and later the Ministry of National Investment Plan merged into the Ministry of Economy and Regional Development in 2011. The Ministry of Economy was reunified from 2012 to 2013 with the Ministry of Finance under Mlađan Dinkić. At the same time, Regional Development was joined with the Local-Self Government into unified ministry (later Ministry of State Administration and Local Self-Government). In 2013, Ministry of Economy was once again split from Finance under Saša Radulović.

== Organization ==
The ministry is organized into following departments:

- Department for small and medium-size companies and the entrepreneurship
- Department for companies and business registry
- Department for privatization, liquidation, and the industrial policy
- Department for control and supervision of state-owned companies
- Department for investments
- Department for investments in the infrastructure projects
- Department for quality control of industrial products

== List of ministers ==
Political Party: DSS G17 Plus URS SNS n-p JS SPS

No.	Portrait	Minister	Took office	Left office	Time in office	Party	Cabinet
Minister of Economy
1	Dragan Maršićanin	Dragan Maršićanin (born 1950)	3 March 2004	10 May 2004	68 days	DSS	Koštunica I
–	Zora Simović	Zora Simović (born 1951); Acting	10 May 2004	19 October 2004	162 days	DSS	Koštunica I
2	Predrag Bubalo	Predrag Bubalo (born 1954)	19 October 2004	15 May 2007	2 years, 208 days	DSS	Koštunica I
Economy and Regional Development
3	Mlađan Dinkić	Mlađan Dinkić (born 1964)	15 May 2007	21 February 2011	3 years, 282 days	G17+	Koštunica II; Cvetković
–	Jasna Matić	Jasna Matić (born 1964); Acting	21 February 2011	14 March 2011	21 days	G17+	Cvetković
4	Nebojša Ćirić	Nebojša Ćirić (born 1974)	14 March 2011	27 July 2012	1 year, 135 days	G17+	Cvetković
Minister of Finance and Economy
(3)	Mlađan Dinkić	Mlađan Dinkić (born 1964)	27 July 2012	2 September 2013	1 year, 37 days	URS	Dačić
Minister of Economy
5	Saša Radulović	Saša Radulović (born 1965)	2 September 2013	24 January 2014	144 days	Independent	Dačić
–	Igor Mirović	Igor Mirović (born 1968); Acting	24 January 2014	27 April 2014	93 days	SNS	Dačić
6	Dušan Vujović	Dušan Vujović (1951–2025)	27 April 2014	4 August 2014	99 days	Independent	Vučić I
–	Dušan Vujović	Dušan Vujović (1951–2025); Acting	4 August 2014	3 September 2014	30 days	Independent	Vučić I
7	Željko Sertić	Željko Sertić (born 1968)	3 September 2014	11 August 2016	1 year, 343 days	SNS	Vučić I
8	Goran Knežević	Goran Knežević (born 1957)	11 August 2016	28 October 2020	4 years, 78 days	SNS	Vučić II; Brnabić
9	Anđelka Atanasković	Anđelka Atanasković (born 1958)	28 October 2020	26 October 2022	1 year, 363 days	SNS	Brnabić II
10	Rade Basta	Rade Basta (born 1979)	26 October 2022	22 June 2023	240 days	JS	Brnabić III
–	Siniša Mali	Siniša Mali (born 1972); Acting	22 June 2023	6 September 2023	75 days	SNS	Brnabić III
11	Slobodan Cvetković	Slobodan Cvetković (born 1974)	6 September 2023	2 May 2024	239 days	SPS	Brnabić III
12	Adrijana Mesarović	Adrijana Mesarović (born 1981)	2 May 2024	Incumbent	2 years, 98 days	SNS	Vučević; Macut

== See also ==
- Ministry of Industry (1991–2001)
- Ministry of Privatization and Economic Reconstruction (1991–2004)
- Ministry of Foreign Economic Relations (1991–2007)
- Ministry of National Investment Plan (2007–2011)
