= Milorad Mišković (politician) =

Serbian politician and businessman (born 1948)

Milorad Mišković (Serbian Cyrillic: Милорад Мишковић; born 1948) is an entrepreneur and former politician in Serbia. He was the general manager of the Jabuka retail chain and was a cabinet minister in Serbia and the Federal Republic of Yugoslavia. During his time in government, he was a member of the Socialist Party of Serbia (Socijalistička partija Srbije, SPS).

He is not to be confused with Miroslav Mišković, the owner of Delta Holding, whose name has sometimes been misrendered as "Milorad Mišković" in the Serbian media.

== Private career ==
Mišković holds a Bachelor of Laws degree. He was the director-general of Jabuka prior to entering political life.

== Politician ==
=== Yugoslavian cabinet minister ===
Mišković was appointed as Yugoslavia's minister of domestic trade in the administration of Radoje Kontić on 20 March 1997. In June, he announced that the federal and republican governments in Yugoslavia would target the grey economy that had grown during the Yugoslav Wars and international sanctions of the previous years, via a crackdown on smuggling routes and by other means. He said that the government's goal was to reduce the grey economy's share in the social product from forty per cent to between ten and twenty per cent. Later in the same year, he urged the adoption of a value added tax to unify existing tax regulations and reduce evasion. He generally encouraged trade liberalization as a means of countering the domestic monopolies that had emerged in the upheavals of the 1990s.

Mišković rejected suggestions that the Yugoslav dinar would be devalued in September 1997, arguing that an increase in the money supply over the summer months was grounded in hard currency inflow from the sale of Serbian Telecom. He approved a significant increase in meat imports to Yugoslavia in the same period, to address a market shortage and to prevent price hikes. In October 1997, he announced that Yugoslavia would impose a state monopoly on cigarette imports and radically cut taxes to curb the illegal economy in the field.

In 1998, amid concerns about new international sanctions, Mišković indicated the government would sell official food reserves to prevent the prospect of shortages.

He kept his position in cabinet when Momir Bulatović succeeded Kontić as prime minister in May 1998, although he stood down following a shuffle on 18 January 1999. He later served as vice-president of the Serbian Chamber of Commerce.

Mišković received the second position on the Socialist Party's electoral list for Voždovac in the 2000 Yugoslavian parliamentary election. The list won two seats in the division. This did not give him an automatic mandate under Yugoslavia's electoral law at the time, and it does not appear that he served.

=== Serbian cabinet minister ===
SPS leader Slobodan Milošević was defeated by Vojislav Koštunica in the 2000 Yugoslavian presidential election, which took place concurrently with the parliamentary election. This was a watershed event that prompted major changes in Serbian and Yugoslavian politics.

After the fall of Milošević, a transitional government was established in Serbia pending new parliamentary elections. The government consisted of members of the SPS, the Democratic Opposition of Serbia (Demokratska opozicija Srbije, DOS), and the Serbian Renewal Movement (Srpski pokret obnove, SPO). Mišković was appointed to the government as a SPS representative, serving as minister of trade. On assuming office, he accused the outgoing ministry of deliberately encouraging inflation by removing price caps in its final days in office, so as to undermine the new administration. To stabilize the market, he called for the state to sell commodity reserves and to further liberalize international trade. During the same time, he announced an agreement with Serbia's oil companies to reduce consumer prices.

Mišković appeared on the Socialist Party's electoral list in the 2000 Serbian parliamentary election. Shortly before the election, though, on 19 December 2000, he submitted his resignation as trade minister, resigned from the Socialist Party, and announced that he was withdrawing his candidature for the Serbian parliament. He did not provide a reason for his actions. He has not returned to political life since this time.

== Return to the private sector ==
Mišković returned as general manager of the Jabuka retail chain after leaving politics. In December 2001, he announced price reductions for a variety of products, arguing that prices of food products in Serbia were too high relative to surrounding countries.

In 2009, he opened a number of "SOS Market" outlets in Belgrade, for the benefit of lower-income citizens during an economic downturn.
