= Dejan Mihajlov =

Serbian lawyer and politician

- Дејан Михајлов

Secretary-General of the Government of Serbia
- In office 3 March 2004 – 7 July 2008
- Prime Minister: Vojislav Koštunica
- Preceded by: Maja Vasić
- Succeeded by: Tamara Stojčević

Personal details
- Born: 26 February 1972 (age 54) Pančevo, SFR Yugoslavia
- Education: University of Belgrade
- Occupation: Politician
- Profession: Lawyer

Dejan Mihajlov (Serbian: Дејан Михајлов, born 26 February 1972) is a Serbian lawyer and politician. He served as the Secretary-General of the Government of Serbia from 2004 to 2008.

== Education and career ==
He was born in 1972 in Pančevo. He graduated from the University of Belgrade Faculty of Law. Between 2000 and 2004, Mihajlov was a president of the Democratic Party of Serbia's caucus in the Serbian parliament.

He served as the Secretary-General of the Government of Serbia from 2004 to 2008.

On 9 November 2006, Serbian police issued an arrest warrant for Mihajlov for failing to appear before the Court in a case presented against him after the court had sent twenty-six notices requesting his presence.
