= Dušan Vujović =

Serbian economist and politician (1951–2025)

- Душан Вујовић

Minister of Finance
- In office 15 July 2014 – 16 May 2018
- Prime Minister: Aleksandar Vučić; Ivica Dačić (acting); Ana Brnabić
- Preceded by: Lazar Krstić
- Succeeded by: Ana Brnabić (acting)

Minister of Defence (acting)
- In office 5 February 2016 – 2 March 2016
- Prime Minister: Aleksandar Vučić
- Preceded by: Bratislav Gašić
- Succeeded by: Zoran Đorđević

Minister of Economy (acting)
- In office 27 April 2014 – 3 September 2014
- Prime Minister: Aleksandar Vučić
- Preceded by: Igor Mirović
- Succeeded by: Željko Sertić

Personal details
- Born: 22 July 1951 Požarevac, PR Serbia, FPR Yugoslavia (now Serbia)
- Died: 15 May 2025 (aged 73)
- Party: Independent
- Children: 2
- Education: University of Belgrade
- Profession: Economist

Dušan Vujović (Serbian Cyrillic: Душан Вујовић; 22 July 1951 – 15 May 2025) was a Serbian economist and politician. He served as the Minister of Finance in the Government of Serbia from 2014 to 2018. He also had short terms as acting Minister of Economy in 2014 and as acting Minister of Defence in 2016. Vujović was a supporter of keynesianism.

== Education and career ==
Vujović was born in Požarevac on 22 July 1951. He finished primary and secondary school in his hometown and later graduated from the University of Belgrade Faculty of Economics in 1974. He received his Master’s degrees in 1977, and a PhD in 1984 from the Belgrade Faculty of Economics. He did his post-doctoral studies at the University of California, Berkeley.

He worked as an assistant professor at the Institute of International Politics and Economics in Belgrade and as an assistant at the Belgrade Faculty of Economics, and then as an assistant professor and associate professor at this faculty. He was a long-time associate of the World Bank. He led the program of advanced training of the staff of ministries of economy of countries in transition of eastern and southern Europe, the former Soviet Union, China and Vietnam. He worked as representative of Serbia and Montenegro in the World Bank’s Board of Governors, led a Bank’s program in Ukraine and was the Bank’s chief economist for Europe and Central Asia.

Vujović also worked as a consultant of the World Bank and USAID in the field of innovation, budget reform and public sector reform.

He published a number of papers in international journals and was also a professor of economics at the Singidunum University in Belgrade.

== Political career ==
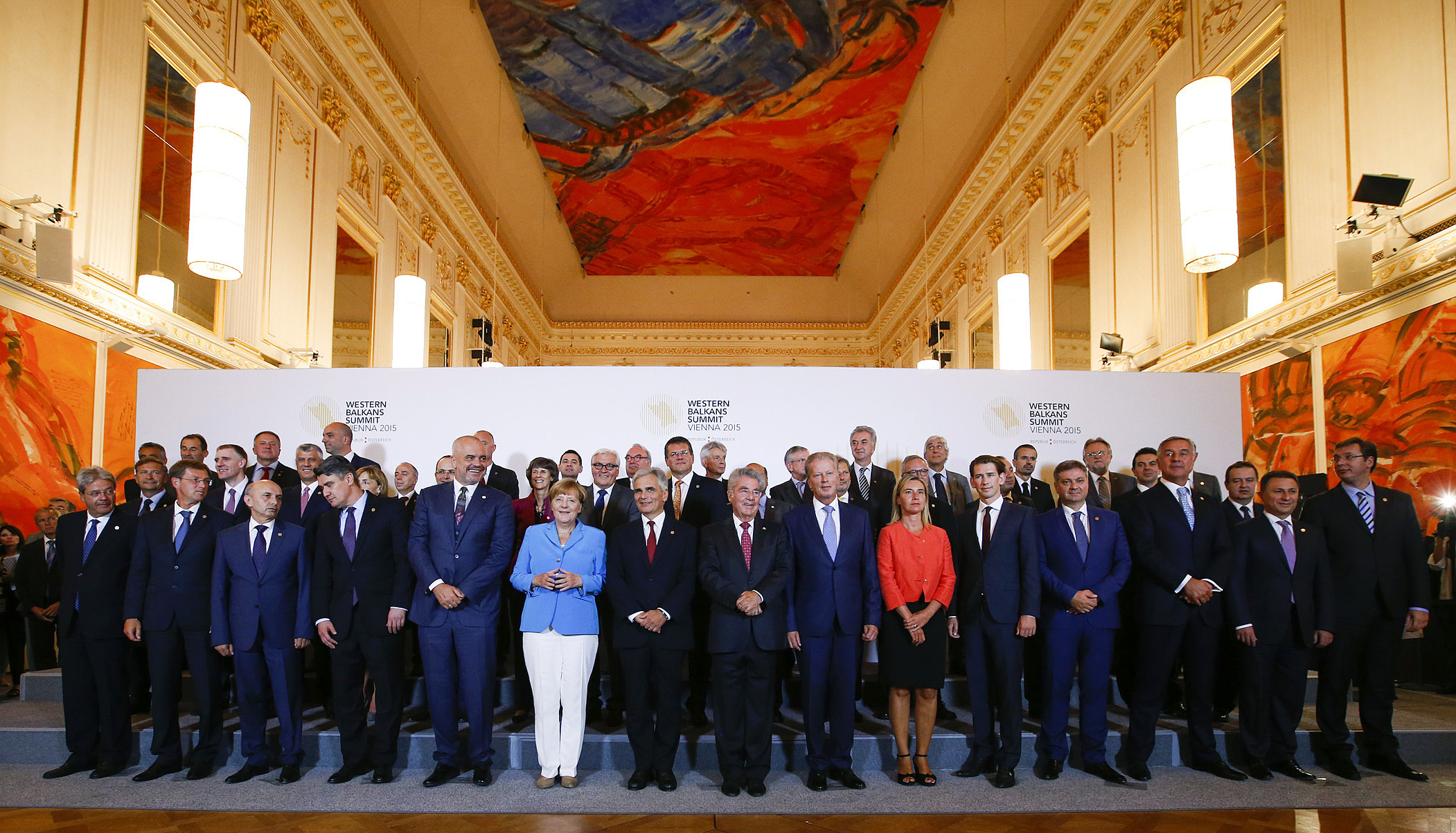
Vujović at the 2015 Western Balkans Summit in Vienna, Austria.

On 27 April 2014, following the 2014 parliamentary elections, Vujović was elected as the Minister of Finance of Serbia in the Government of Serbia, on nomination by the leading government party Serbian Progressive Party (SNS). He also had short stints as acting Minister of Economy in 2014 and as acting Minister of Defence in 2016.

On 7 May 2018, he resigned from the position of Minister of Finance, for personal reasons. He stated that during his tenure: "measurable results were achieved, among which are macroeconomic stabilization, fiscal consolidation and the definition of structural reforms necessary to ensure that these results are sustained". On 16 May, the National Assembly ratified his resignation and Ana Brnabić, at the time Prime Minister of Serbia temporarily took over his duties.

== Personal life and death ==
Vujović was married and had two children. He spoke English and Russian. He was one of the richest ministers in the Government of Serbia, with multiple real estate properties in Washington, D.C., and Belgrade, estimated to be worth nearly $3 million.

Vujović died on 15 May 2025, at the age of 73.

== Other activities ==
- World Academy of Art and Science, Fellow

Political offices
Preceded by Lazar Krstić	Minister of Finance of Serbia; 2014–2018	Succeeded by Ana Brnabić (Acting)
