= Jovanjica case =

Serbian political scandal

The Jovanjica case is a Serbian political scandal. Jovanjica, owned by Predrag Koluvija, was a company that was known for producing organic food until it was raided by police in November 2019 and found to be a large-scale marijuana farm. Koluvija, who had connections to the Serbian Progressive Party, was accused of being the leader of a criminal group that cultivated and sold marijuana with the help of police officers and other intelligence agents. He is currently on trial in two separate cases before the Special Court for Organized Crime in Belgrade. The case became a major scandal for Serbian political figures, due to the involvement of several high ranking officials.

== Background ==
Predrag Koluvija (Serbian Cyrillic: Предраг Колувија) is a Serbian businessman. He was also part of the official delegation of Serbia during a business forum in Moscow in 2019, when he accompanied President Aleksandar Vučić, and is close to the ruling Serbian Progressive Party and high ranking political officials. Jovanjica, owned by Koluvija, was a company that was known for producing organic food.

== Raid and arrests ==
Following a stop with police for reckless driving, the police found Koluvija to be in possession of fake ID. This led them to his farm, which was found instead to be a large-scale marijuana farm. The business was raided by police in November 2019, and Kovulja was arrested. At the farm was found 650 kilograms (1,430 lb) of dried marijuana and 65000 raw stems.

== Legal proceedings ==
Koluvija is accused of being the leader of a criminal group that cultivated and sold marijuana with the help of police officers and other intelligence agents. He was placed under house arrest. Following his release from prison and his placement under house arrest, there was public outcry. President Aleksandar Vučić defended this placement, on the grounds that he had not killed anyone and that marijuana was a drug that "half the region, the Germans and others, ha[ve] legalized".

He is currently on trial in two separate cases before the Special Court for Organized Crime in Belgrade. In 2023, many of Koluvija's properties were ordered to be seized.

Koluvija sued the news portal KRIK for calling him an "accused drug boss". They were found guilty for violating his presumption of innocence. BIRN was also sued by Koluvija over their coverage on the case, for alleged incorrect reporting. BIRN claimed that Koluvija was attempting to silence the press.

== Reaction ==
The case became a major scandal for Serbian political figures, due to the involvement of several high ranking officials.
