= Ministry of Privatization and Economic Reconstruction (Serbia) =

- Министарство за приватизацију и економску реконструкцију Ministarstvo za privatizaciju i ekonomsku rekonstrukciju

Ministry overview
- Formed: 11 February 1991
- Dissolved: 3 March 2004
- Superseding Ministry: Ministry of Economy
- Jurisdiction: Government of Serbia

The Ministry of Privatization and Economic Reconstruction of the Republic of Serbia (Serbian: Министарство за приватизацију и економску реконструкцију / Ministarstvo za privatizaciju i ekonomsku rekonstrukciju) was the ministry in the Government of Serbia which was in charge of the privatization and economic reconstruction. The ministry was abolished on 3 March 2004.

== History ==
The Ministry was established on 11 February 1991. Over the years, it has changed its name several times. It was abolished on 3 March 2004, and the Ministry of Economy took over its jurisdictions.

== List of ministers ==
Minister	Image	Party	Term start	Term end	Lifespan
Radoje Đukić		Socialist Party of Serbia (SPS)	18 March 1994	11 February 1997	1949–
Milan Beko		Independent	11 February 1997	24 March 1998	1961–
Jorgovanka Tabaković		Serbian Radical Party (SRS)	24 March 1998	24 October 2000	1960–
Oskar Kovač		Socialist Party of Serbia (SPS)	24 October 2000	25 January 2001	1937–
Aleksandar Vlahović		Democratic Party (DS)	25 January 2001	3 March 2004	1963–

== See also ==
- Ministry of Economy
