= Miloš Vučević =

Serbian politician (born 1974)

- Милош Вучевић
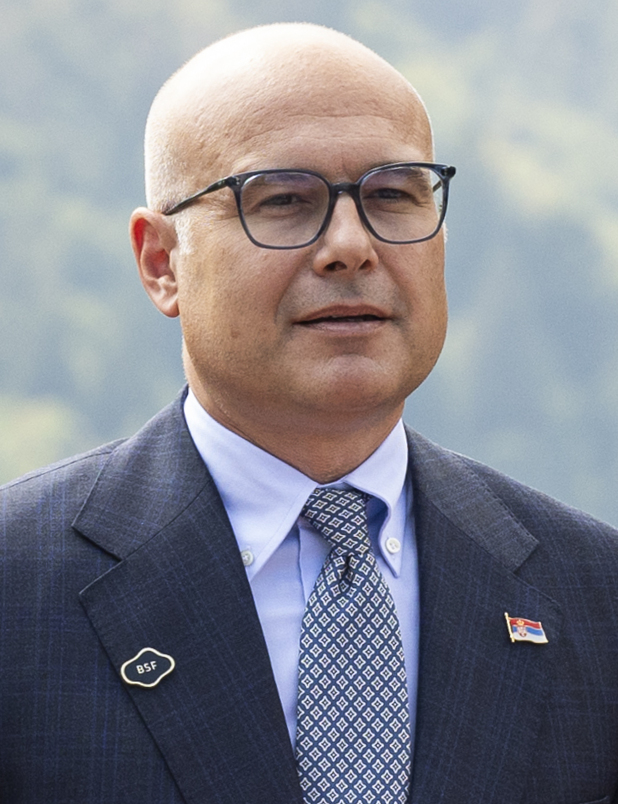
- Vučević in 2024

Prime Minister of Serbia
- In office 2 May 2024 – 16 April 2025
- President: Aleksandar Vučić
- Deputy: Siniša Mali; Ivica Dačić; Irena Vujović; Aleksandar Vulin
- Preceded by: Ana Brnabić; Ivica Dačić (acting)
- Succeeded by: Đuro Macut

President of the Serbian Progressive Party
- Incumbent
- Assumed office 27 May 2023
- Preceded by: Aleksandar Vučić

Deputy Prime Minister of Serbia
- In office 26 October 2022 – 2 May 2024
- Prime Minister: Ana Brnabić
- Preceded by: Zorana Mihajlović
- Succeeded by: Aleksandar Vulin

Minister of Defence
- In office 26 October 2022 – 2 May 2024
- Prime Minister: Ana Brnabić
- Preceded by: Nebojša Stefanović
- Succeeded by: Bratislav Gašić

Mayor of Novi Sad
- In office 13 September 2012 – 26 October 2022
- Preceded by: Igor Pavličić
- Succeeded by: Milan Đurić

Personal details
- Born: 10 December 1974 (age 51) Novi Sad, Yugoslavia
- Party: SNS (since 2008)
- Children: 2
- Education: University of Novi Sad
- Occupation: Politician
- Profession: Lawyer

Miloš Vučević (Serbian Cyrillic: Милош Вучевић, pronounced [mǐloʃ ʋûːtʃeʋitɕ]; born 10 December 1974) is a Serbian politician and lawyer who served as Prime Minister of Serbia from 2024 to 2025. He has been the president of the Serbian Progressive Party (SNS) since 2023, and was previously the Mayor of Novi Sad from 2012 to 2022 and the Minister of Defence and Deputy Prime Minister of Serbia from 2022 to 2024.

Born in Novi Sad, Vučević graduated from the Faculty of Law of the University of Novi Sad in 1999, after which he worked as a lawyer. He joined SNS in 2008 and was elected the president of the party's Novi Sad branch in 2011. He led SNS in the 2012 local elections, winning 16% of the popular vote in Novi Sad. Vučević became mayor of Novi Sad in September 2012 after ousting Igor Pavličić of the Democratic Party from power. He led coalitions that included SNS and the Socialist Party of Serbia, and later the League of Social Democrats of Vojvodina and the Serbian Patriotic Alliance. As mayor, he redesigned the city's urbanism plan, worked on improving the city's infrastructure, and oversaw the beginning of the Novi Sad on Water project and the response to the COVID-19 pandemic. He was re-elected as mayor in 2016 and 2020, becoming the longest-serving mayor of Novi Sad in 2021. During his tenure, Novi Sad was also the European Youth Capital and the European Capital of Culture.

Vučević was appointed minister of defence in the third cabinet of Ana Brnabić in October 2022. During his tenure, he played a role in the North Kosovo crisis, became the president of SNS, and allegedly sent weapons to Ukraine, though he denied the allegations. Vučević led SNS in the 2023 Serbian parliamentary election, in which they won 48% of the popular vote. After the elections, he became prime minister of Serbia. As prime minister, he worked on trade relations and introducing lithium mining projects, but was also met with environmental and education trade union protests. After the Novi Sad railway station canopy collapse, mass anti-corruption protests were organised by students in Serbia. He resigned as prime minister in January 2025 after a group of SNS members physically attacked students; he was succeeded by Đuro Macut in April.

Vučević's positions are populist. He favours military neutrality, but also cooperation with NATO and the United States. He supports participation in peacekeeping missions as well. He opposes introducing sanctions against Russia related to the invasion of Ukraine, but supports the territorial integrity of Ukraine. He also opposes the independence of Kosovo. Although a self-described anti-corruption politician, Vučević has been accused of corruption and having connections with controversial businessmen.

== Early life and career ==
Miloš Vučević was born on 10 December 1974 in Novi Sad, SAP Vojvodina, SR Serbia, SFR Yugoslavia. His father, Zoran, was a lawyer and the president of the City Assembly of Novi Sad from 2004 to 2008 as a member of the Serbian Radical Party (SRS). He died in 2021. Vučević finished elementary school in Novi Sad and a gymnasium in Bački Petrovac. He then enrolled in the Faculty of Law of the University of Novi Sad, where he graduated in 1999.

After his graduation, Vučević worked as a lawyer up until 2012. Little is known about Vučević's political career before he joined the Serbian Progressive Party (SNS) in 2008. Nedim Sejdinović of the newspaper Vreme noted that according to some individuals, Vučević was initially a member of SRS, having joined the party due to their promotion of Greater Serbia.

He was elected president of the Novi Sad branch of SNS in 2011. During this period, he established close connections with the Vučić family, particularly Aleksandar and Andrej. He led the faction opposing Igor Mirović. In the 2012 local elections, Vučević led the party to winning 16% of the popular vote in Novi Sad. Initially, the Democratic Party (DS) obtained a majority in the City Assembly and retained control of Novi Sad. Igor Pavličić of DS was elected mayor of Novi Sad, with Siniša Šević of the Socialist Party of Serbia (SPS) elected as his deputy. Pavličić's cabinet was also composed of the League of Social Democrats of Vojvodina (LSV). The constitutive session was boycotted by SNS, SRS, the Democratic Party of Serbia (DSS), and Dveri.

After the 2012 Serbian parliamentary election, SNS, SPS, and United Regions of Serbia formed a government, ousting DS from power. Despite this, Pavličić said that the Novi Sad government would not change, believing that he has full support from SPS and LSV. On local level, SNS initiated successful no confidence votes, in which they toppled DS from power in cities such as Aranđelovac, Leskovac, and Užice, with the help of SPS. In September 2012, Pavličić alleged that SNS was trying to topple him from power.

== Mayor of Novi Sad ==
=== First term ===
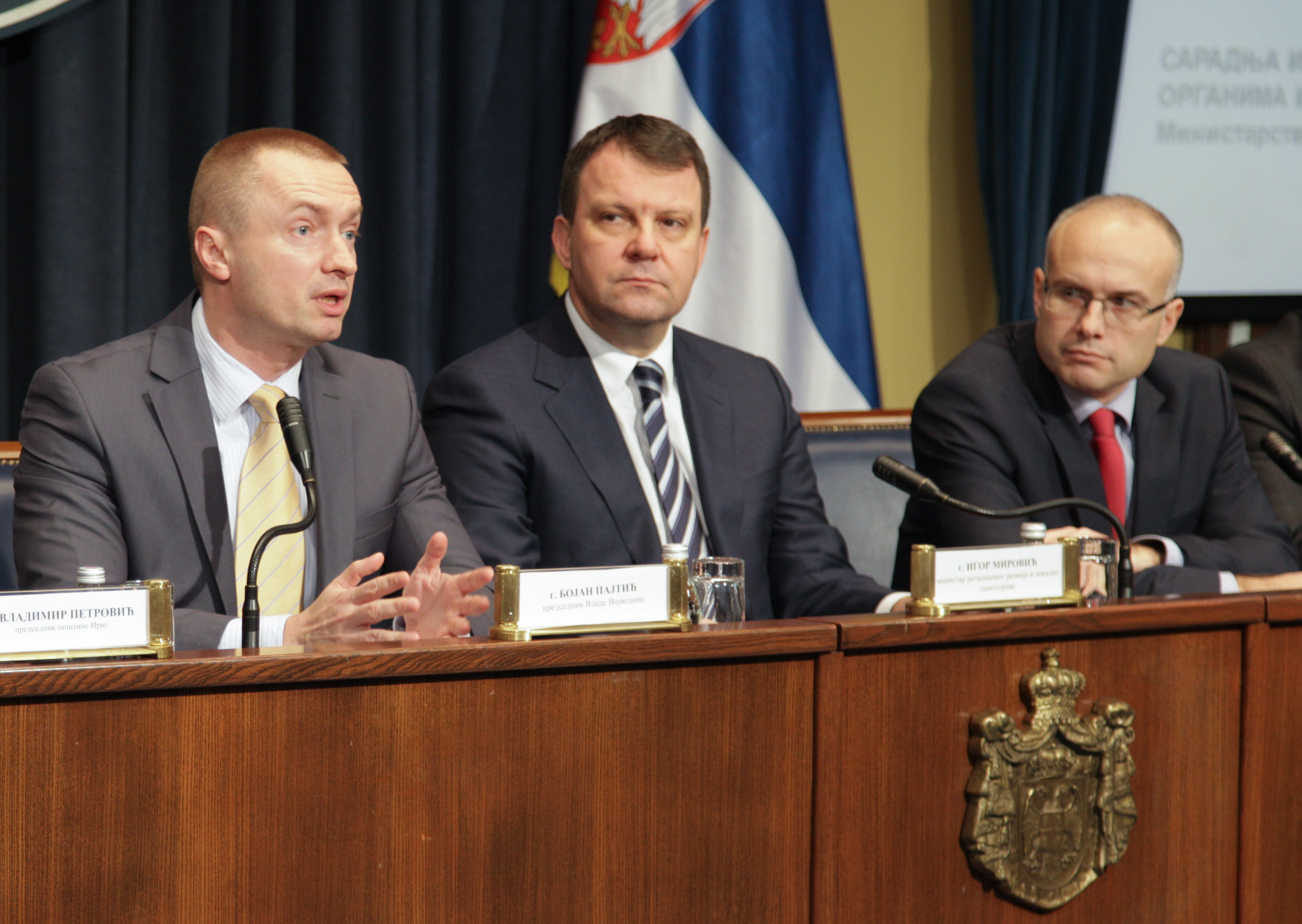
Vučević with Bojan Pajtić and Igor Mirović in 2013

Vučević was sworn in as mayor of Novi Sad on 13 September 2012, ousting Pavličić in a vote of no confidence. His investiture vote was approved by 42 councillors; DS and LSV abstained from the vote, while SRS councillors left the session at its beginning. Vučević's deputy was Borko Ilić from DSS, while his cabinet consisted of 11 city ministers. Šević was also elected president of the City Assembly of Novi Sad, while Miroslav Ilić from Novi Sad was elected Šević's deputy. Aleksandra Jerkov of LSV alleged that SNS blackmailed councillors to topple DS from power in Novi Sad.

In his investiture speech, Vučević highlighted finishing the construction of Liberty Bridge and Boulevard Europe, the renovation of Stadion Karađorđe, and the completion of the sewage network in suburban neighbourhoods as his main objectives. Upon becoming mayor, the Novi Sad economy started to recover in the aftermath of the Great Recession. In an interview for newspaper Blic, Vučević revealed that, upon assuming office, he was met with problems in the public communal services, particularly with financial problems, noting that they were over-indebted and had frozen bank accounts. In November 2012, Vučević introduced five buses to the city's public transport, and expressed hope that the government of Serbia would continue funding the Exit festival.

In April 2013, SNS and SPS organised a protest in Novi Sad, demanding an early election for the Assembly of Vojvodina and the resignation of the president of the government of Vojvodina, Bojan Pajtić. At the protest, Vučević accused Pajtić of bad governance and of not "[representing] the people of the province". He also announced that SNS would start a petition demanding an early election and the resignation of Pajtić. In May 2013, Vučević and the mayor of Gomel, Belarus signed an agreement on their respective cities becoming sister cities, while in July, Vučević opened the Honorary Consulate of Belarus in Novi Sad in the presence of the Belarusian minister of foreign affairs. Vučević later opened the Office for People with Disabilities in September 2013. In November, SNS and LSV established cooperation for reforming public communal services.

DS called for the resignation of Vučević in January 2014, accusing him of being "incompetent". In response, SNS denied the accusations. Together with Irinej, the Bishop of Bačka, Vučević participated in a commemoration of the Novi Sad raid in the same month. Later in April, he was present at a commemoration of deportation of Jews from Novi Sad that took place in 1944. In December, Vučević attended a ceremony where the Health Centre of Novi Sad obtained nine new vehicles. In 2015, Vučević became a member of the board of directors of the National Alliance for Local Economic Development; he served there until 2016. Vučević was re-elected president of the Novi Sad branch of SNS in April 2015. In the City Assembly of Novi Sad, SNS established connections with Third Serbia in July 2015. Later in December, a substation was opened in the Rimski Šančevi neighbourhood of Novi Sad; Vučević noted that with its completion, the substation would improve the electricity supply of suburban settlements of Novi Sad. In April 2016, Vučević took part in the opening of the National Distribution Dispatch Centre of Elektroprivreda Srbije in Novi Sad.

=== Second term ===
In the 2016 local elections, SNS won 41% of the popular vote in Novi Sad. After the elections, Vučević became vice-president of SNS alongside Marija Obradović, Marko Đurić, and Milenko Jovanov. In June, Vučević sought to create a new local government coalition; he formed a coalition including SNS, SPS, LSV, and the Green Party. The City Assembly re-elected him as mayor of Novi Sad in July 2016. His investiture vote was approved by 52 councillors, while 22 voted against. Srđan Kružević from United Serbia was elected his deputy. The new local government was dubbed "the most Novi Sad coalition without an ideology" (Najnovosadskija koalicija bez ideologije).

The City Assembly of Novi Sad voted in September 2016 to lower the salary of mayor of Novi Sad and other highly positioned officials. A month later, Vučević and Mirović, now the president of the government of Vojvodina, signed a document on joint investments into public infrastructure of Novi Sad, including the reconstruction of the University Campus, the expansion of Szentendre Road, and the construction of a new building for the Radio Television of Vojvodina. In March 2017, Vučević signed a letter of intent on cooperation with Siemens, on behalf of the city. A protest opposing the demolition of a city park was organised in May. In response, Vučević cancelled its demolition. A month later, Vučević was suggested as a candidate for the next prime minister of Serbia. In the same month, he signed a charter on gender equality. Later in December, Vučević's statement on the independence of the judiciary regarding the acquittal of former minister Predrag Bubalo was criticised by judges and the High Council of the Judiciary.

In August 2018, Vučević suggested the demolition of SPC Vojvodina (SPENS). This proposal was met with public backlash. In 2019, he backtracked the decision due to not obtaining public support. With the presence of Aleksandar Vučić and Johannes Hahn, the Žeželj Bridge was opened in August 2018. Vučević also unveiled the Peter I Statue in November. A month later, Vučević met with the mayor of Istočno Sarajevo, announcing that the two cities would establish cooperation regarding culture, sports, and economy. In 2019, Novi Sad was the European Youth Capital. The database servers of Novi Sad's city administration were hacked in March 2020.

Critics of Vučević note that the city's urbanism plan has changed during his tenure as mayor, primarily due to the wishes of investment companies. He also oversaw the beginning of the construction of Novi Sad on Water (Novi Sad na vodi), which was announced in April 2019. The project was presented as an apartment complex on the Danube bank, with Vučević citing London, Rotterdam, and New York City as having similar concepts. The plot of the project was bought by construction company Galens. The planned neighbourhood's construction cost around €2 billion. In 2020, the project became embroiled in a controversy, with critics arguing that the project served organised crime and corruption. The political opposition and non-governmental organisations opposed its construction; former mayor of Novi Sad Borislav Novaković also accused Galens, Vučević, and Andrej Vučić of corruption. The leadership of public company Vode Vojvodine (Waters of Vojvodina) was replaced by Vučević due to their opposition to the project; Srđan Kružević, Vučević's associate, was brought to the position of director of the company. The Institute Jaroslav Černi was also privatised due to their opposition. In 2024, the Institute was bought by Milenijum tim, a construction company with close relations with SNS. Vučević also oversaw the construction of Pupin's Palace by Galens. He expanded their property from 18,000 m^{2} to 31,000 m^{2}, which brought the company €26 million in revenue.

Vučević oversaw the response to the COVID-19 pandemic in Novi Sad. He closed public transport lines, parks, and market places, and transformed the Novi Sad Fair into a COVID-19 treatment centre. In May 2020, Slovakia donated €50,000 to Novi Sad to combat the virus. Amidst the pandemic, Vučević took part in the SNS campaign for the 2020 Serbian parliamentary election. After the election, he was again suggested as a candidate for the prime minister of Serbia.

=== Third term ===
Vučević led SNS to another victory in the 2020 local elections, winning 58% of the popular vote in Novi Sad. Vučević was re-elected mayor in September 2020. His investiture vote was approved by 70 out of 78 councillors. He became the first mayor to be elected to a third mandate, and formed a coalition consisting of SNS, SPS, LSV, and the Serbian Patriotic Alliance. Milan Đurić of SNS was elected his deputy. In his investiture speech, he highlighted the construction of a new bridge on the Danube, the reconstruction of SPENS, and supporting youth rights as his priorities. In December 2020, Vučević announced he had tested positive for COVID-19.

Vučević became the longest-serving mayor of Novi Sad in 2021. Upon the death of musician Đorđe Balašević in February 2021, Vučević announced that Novi Sad would proclaim a day of mourning on the date of his funeral. According to the newspaper Danas, Andrej Vučić played a key role in alleged blackmailing during the local community council elections in Novi Sad in June 2021. Vučević has denied this claim. In July 2021, a "popup" British embassy was opened in Novi Sad, with the presence of Vučević. Together with Banja Luka mayor Draško Stanivuković, Vučević was present at the 800-year anniversary of the foundation of Nizhny Novgorod. In the same month, he signed a deal with the Ministry of Internal Affairs of Serbia on the construction of a police station in Novi Sad. In September 2021, the Musical-Ballet School finished construction; its construction had begun in May 2016. As part of the school, the City Concert Hall was also opened. In November 2021, Vučević was re-elected vice-president of the party at the SNS party assembly. In the same month, he unveiled a statue of Vojislav Tankosić, one of the founders of the Black Hand society. A month later, Vučević signed a deal on behalf of Novi Sad to obtain funding for electric buses.

During 2022, Novi Sad was the European Capital of Culture. Vučević supported the presidential candidacy of Aleksandar Vučić in that year's general election. In June, he unveiled the statues of Peter the Great and Đorđe Stratimirović. Upon the opening of the 13th convocation of the National Assembly of Serbia, Vučević briefly served as a member of parliament (MP) from 1 to 5 August 2022.

== Minister of Defence ==
In the 2022 Serbian general election, SNS won 44% of the popular vote. In the aftermath of the election, Vučević and Ana Brnabić were suggested by Aleksandar Vučić as candidates for the prime minister. Brnabić was given the mandate to form a new government on 27 August, while Vučević was announced as the next deputy prime minister. Vučić announced on 23 October the full composition of the third cabinet of Ana Brnabić, in which Vučević was also mentioned as the next minister of defence. A day later, Vučević resigned as mayor of Novi Sad; he was succeeded by his deputy Milan Đurić on 26 October. On the same day, Vučević was sworn in the government of Serbia, succeeding Nebojša Stefanović.

=== Tenure ===
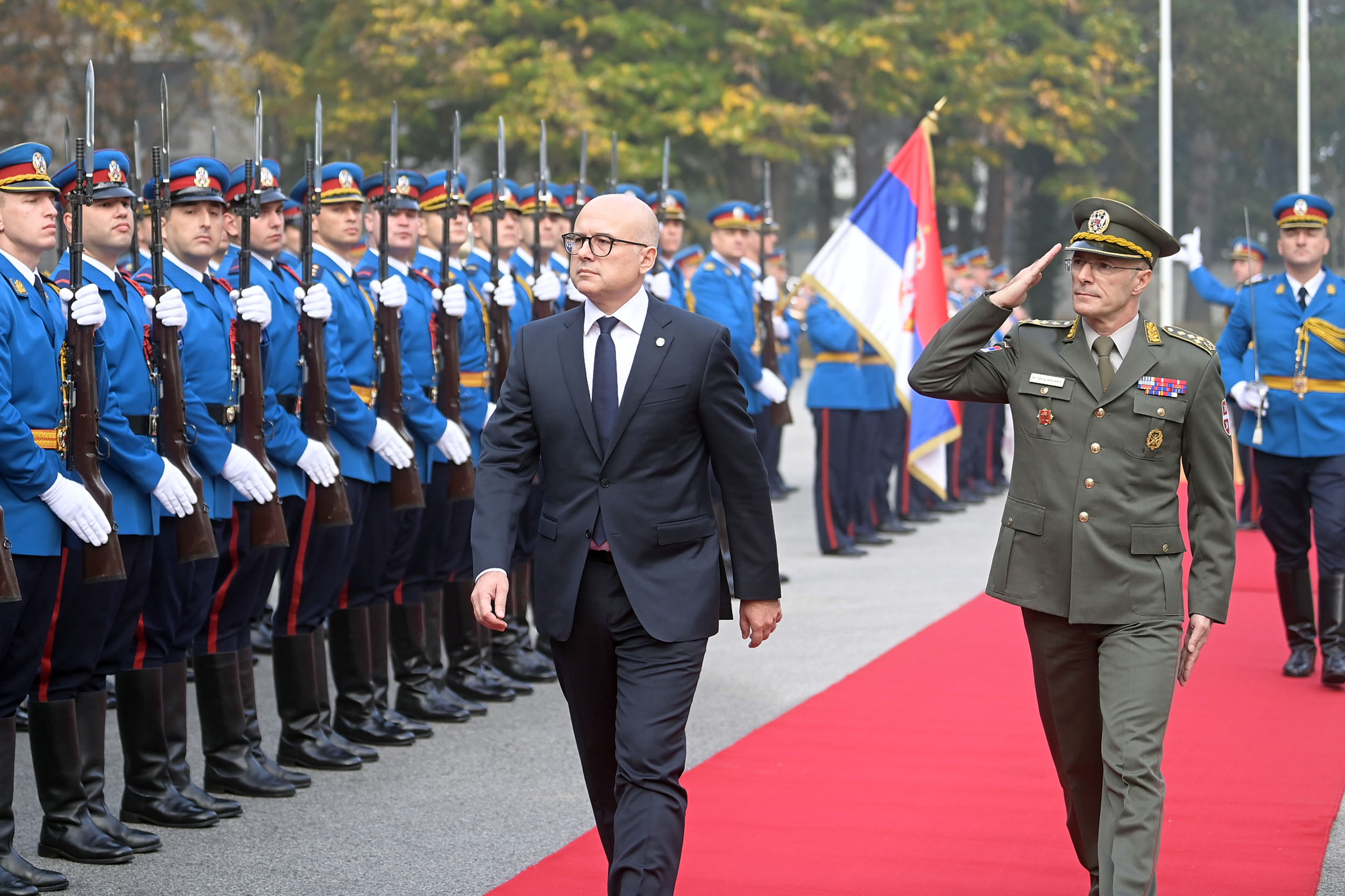
Vučević and Milan Mojsilović visiting the Serbian General Staff in October 2022

Upon becoming minister of defence, he visited the Serbian General Staff with chief of General Staff Milan Mojsilović. He also became involved in the North Kosovo crisis, having supported the increase of the level of combat readiness on 1 November 2022. Vučević met with deputy assistant secretary general of NATO Javier Colomina on 9 November. During the meeting, Vučević declared the Kosovo Force (KFOR) as "crucial for guaranteeing security on Kosovo" (od ključnog značaja za garantovanje bezbednosti širom Kosova). However, he also accused the prime minister of Kosovo Albin Kurti of wanting to ethnically cleanse Serbs. On 26 December, the level of combat readiness was increased again, but by 29 December it was abolished. On New Year's Eve, Vučević and Mojsilović visited the members of the 250th Rocket Brigade.

In January 2023, Vučević announced that the budget of the Ministry of Defence for 2023 was RSD 160 billion. He later visited North Macedonia and met with its prime minister, Dimitar Kovačevski, and minister of defence, Slavjanka Petrovska, and announced that his ministry would re-initiate participation in international military exercises, which was suspended in 2022 after the Russian invasion of Ukraine. In March, the ministry sent international aid to Syria, and appointed Muharem Fazlić as the head of the Directorate for Training and Doctrine of the General Staff. Later that month, Vučević met with Slovenian defence minister Marjan Šarec, with whom he discussed regional cooperation, Ukraine, and KFOR. Vučević was also re-elected president of the Novi Sad branch of SNS.

Miroslav Aleksić, an opposition MP, accused Vučević of secretly sending weapons to Ukraine in February 2023. Vučević denied that the government sent weapons to Ukraine or Russia. In April, following the Pentagon document leaks, documents alleging that Serbia had agreed to sell weapons to the Ukrainian Army to fight Russian forces were leaked. Vučević denied the allegations, calling them "a lie". He stated that Serbia had not sold and would not sell arms to either Ukraine or Russia, and suggested that someone was trying to "destabilise his country and involve it in a conflict it did not want to participate in" (cilj da destabilizuje našu zemlju i da je uvuče u konflikt u kome nećemo da učestvujemo). He also did not rule out the possibility that some Serbian weapons had ended up in the conflict zone by other means.

In November 2022, Nova.rs journalist Danilo Savić speculated that Vučević would succeed Vučić as president of SNS upon his potential resignation. After Vučić announced his departure as president of SNS, Vučević opposed this move. At a party session in May 2023, Vučević was elected president of the SNS. After his election, he confirmed that SNS would be part of Vučić's People's Movement for the State movement. Journalist Ana Lalić characterised the change in leadership as "cosmetic", claiming that the leadership of the party would remain loyal to Vučić's family.

Tensions between Serbia and Kosovo heightened again in May 2023, which resulted into a conflict between KFOR and Kosovo Serbs. In response to this, the level of combat readiness was increased in Serbia. Vučević also met with Serbian Army officials in Raška. In June, Vučević met the president of Cuba, Miguel Díaz-Canel. Later in September, the ministry of defence bought complex combat platforms for the Serbian Army for RSD 13.5 billion. In North Kosovo, Serb militants perpetrated an attack in Banjska in September 2023, which resulted in death of one Kosovo Police officer and three Serb militants. In response, Kurti alleged that Vučević ordered the attack. In November 2023, Vučević met Jens Stoltenberg, the secretary general of NATO. A month later, the ministry of defence obtained new vehicles for the Serbian Army.

== Prime Minister of Serbia ==
In October 2023, the government of Serbia sent a proposal to Vučić to dissolve the National Assembly of Serbia and organise a snap election. Shortly thereafter, Vučić called the parliamentary election. Vučević was active during electoral campaign of SNS. Despite this, analysts argued that Vučić was its main representative in the election, despite not being a candidate. SNS ended up winning 48% of the popular vote. Monitoring organisations alleged electoral fraud in the elections. Vučević denied them.

After the elections, Vučić negotiated with party representatives on the formation of the next government. He nominated Vučević as the mandate holder to form the next government of Serbia in March 2024. In his exposé, Vučević highlighted his support for the introduction of mandatory conscription, accession of Serbia to the EU, and cooperation with China, Russia, and the United States as one of his objectives. The National Assembly elected him prime minister of Serbia on 2 May, succeeding Ana Brnabić. His investiture vote was approved by 152 MPs. Bratislav Gašić succeeded Vučević as minister of defence. Vučević's cabinet became the largest government of Serbia since 2000, with 32 members in total. His deputies included Siniša Mali, Ivica Dačić, Irena Vujović, and Aleksandar Vulin. Due to his close connections with Andrej Vučić, journalist Vojislav Milovančević of Nova.rs argued that Andrej became the informal prime minister of Serbia.

=== Tenure ===
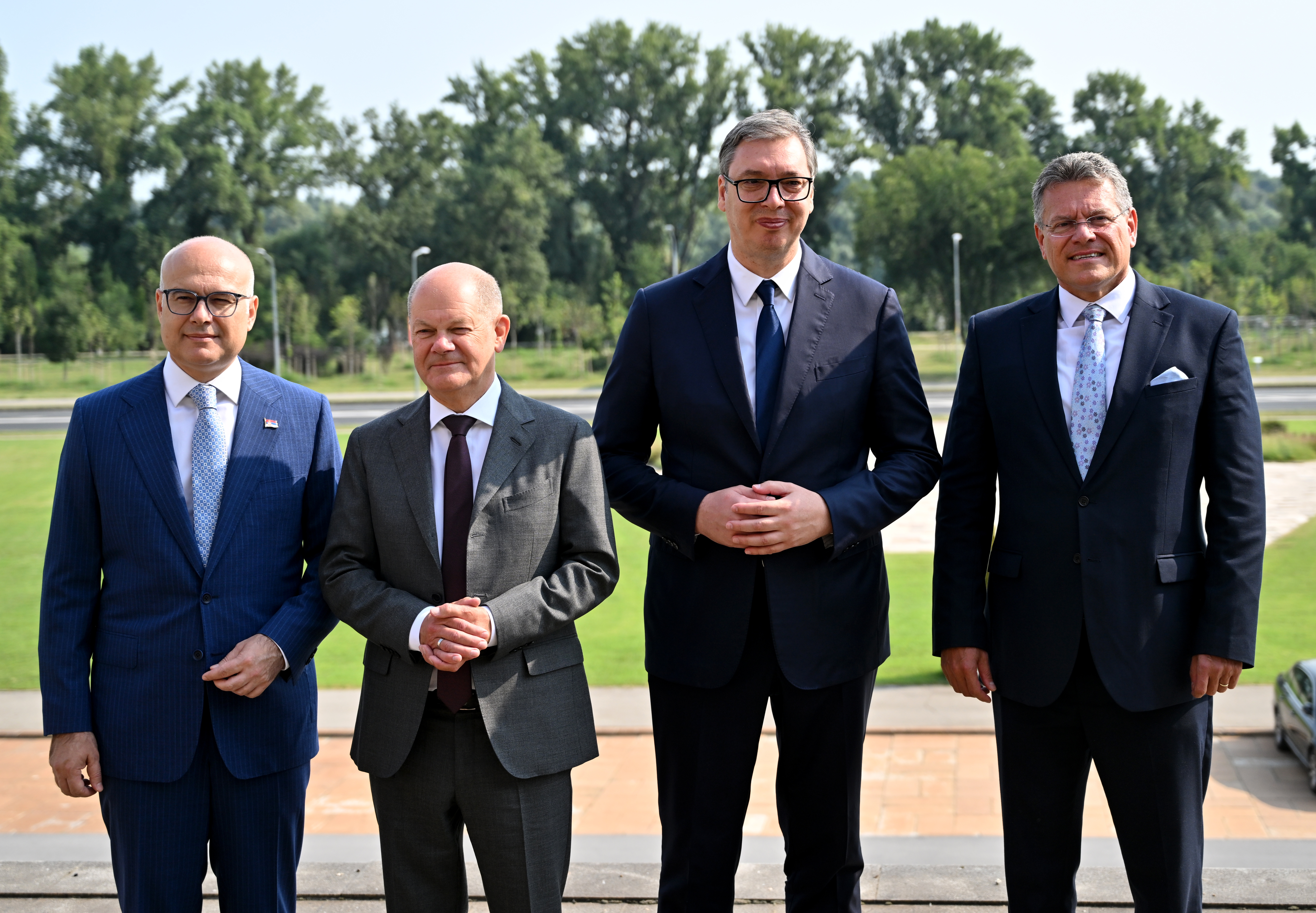
Vučević with Olaf Scholz, Aleksandar Vučić, and Maroš Šefčovič in July 2024

Shortly after his inauguration, he met Chinese president Xi Jinping, Ukrainian minister of foreign affairs Dmytro Kuleba, and Bosnian minister of security Nenad Nešić. He also signed several bilateral agreements with Italy. In September, Vučević discussed cooperation between Serbia and Montenegro with its deputy prime minister, Budimir Aleksić. Later in October, Serbia and North Macedonia signed a memorandum on the construction of a gas pipeline. During the Gaza war, Vučević's government sent ammo to Israel worth over €50 million.

In July, five ministries from Vučević's government signed a memorandum of understanding on the development of nuclear energy. Later that month, Vučević was announced to have tested positive for COVID-19. Vučević was placed on home treatment, and he continued to perform his duties as prime minister from home. During his first 100 days, Vučević's government worked on the trade relationship with China and signed a free trade agreement with Egypt; it also highlighted strengthening cooperation with South Korea. Miloš Bešić, a professor at the Faculty of Political Sciences of the University of Belgrade, argued that the government's work was "almost unnoticed" during the first 100 days.

Vučević met German chancellor Olaf Scholz in July, with whom he discussed lithium mining. With his presence, Serbia signed a memorandum on sustainable raw materials. During the same period, the government reintroduced the Project Jadar of Rio Tinto by a decree. Vučević's government was then met with environmental protests in July and August, with protesters demanding a stop to a lithium mining project. The protest on 10 August was attended by approximately 40,000 people. Vučević's government was also met with protests and strikes from education trade unions in September and October. Trade unions demanded raising wages. The government responded by proposing an increase of 12% in September; trade unions rejected the offer. In October, the government proposed raising wages for 11%, however, trade unions rejected the deal again.

=== Protests and resignation ===
On 1 November 2024, the Novi Sad railway station canopy collapsed, killing 14 people. (Note: Two more later succumbed to death.) The government responded by proclaiming 2 November a day of mourning, while ministers Goran Vesić and Tomislav Momirović resigned. The collapse triggered a series of anti-corruption protests organised by students, which began in November 2024, after SNS members physically attacked a group of students paying homage to the killed. The protests then spread to the faculties of the universities of Belgrade, Novi Sad, Kragujevac, and Niš. Students demanded the release of documentation on the reconstructed Novi Sad railway station, the filing a criminal complaint against those who attacked students, the dismissal of charges against those who were detained at protests, and the increase of funds allocated for faculties by 20%. Vučević declared that the demands were "unclear" and that a colour revolution was allegedly underway. At a 22 December protest on Slavija Square, it was estimated that 100,000 demonstrators were present.

A major series of civil disobedience that was promoted as a "general strike" occurred on 24 January 2025. After a group of SNS members physically attacked students in Novi Sad on 28 January, Vučević announced his resignation. Milan Đurić, the mayor of Novi Sad, also resigned from office. Vučević's resignation was acknowledged by the National Assembly on 19 March. He remained in acting capacity until the election of Đuro Macut on 16 April. In late March, a group of students were attacked again in Novi Sad. Vučević then filed a criminal complaint against them, claiming that they deceived the public.

== Post-premiership ==
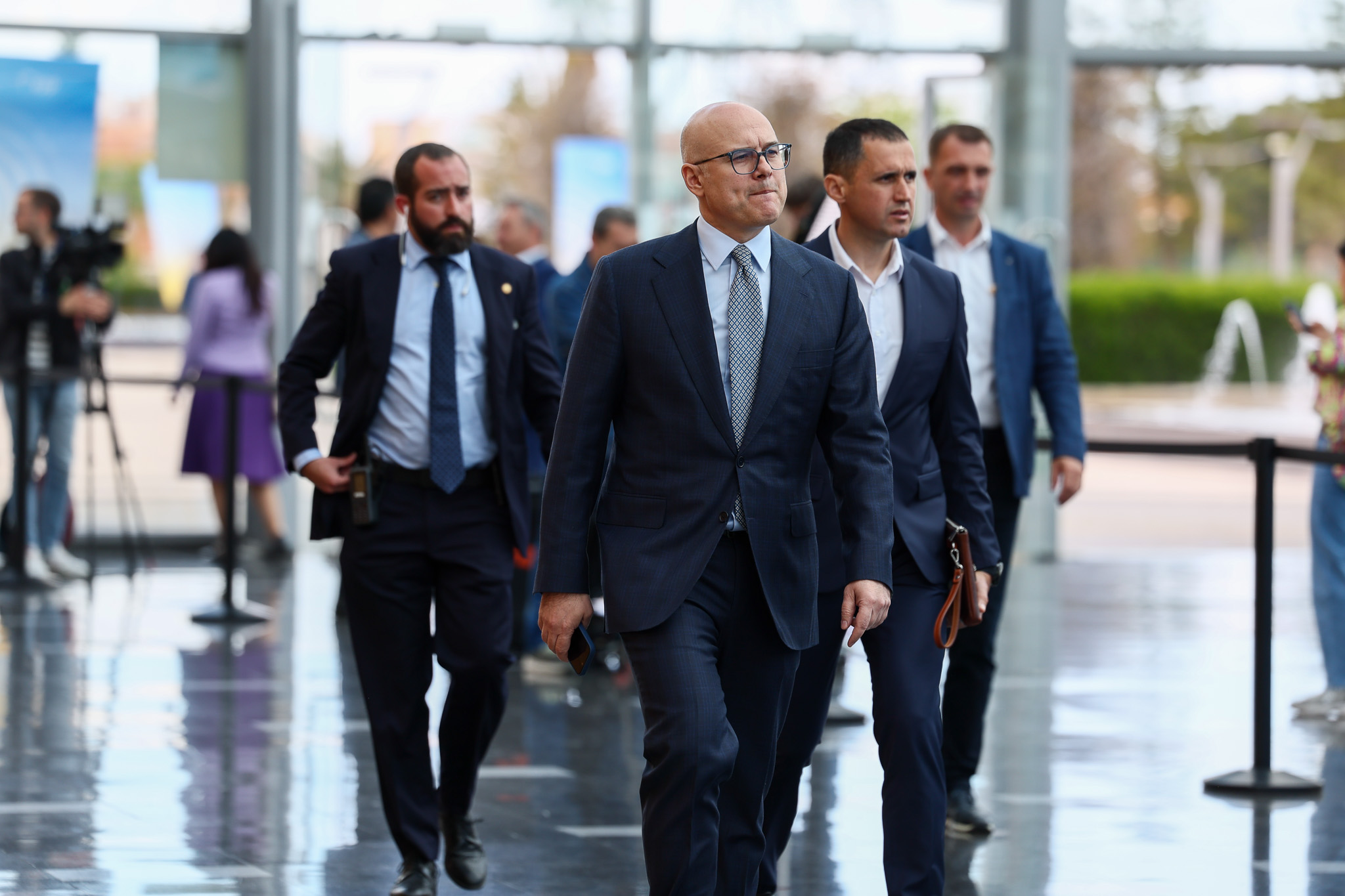
Vučević at the European People's Party congress in Valencia

After leaving the office of prime minister, Vučević was appointed as an adviser to Aleksandar Vučić regarding regional issues. He was present at the European People's Party (EPP) congress in Valencia, where he voted in favour of Manfred Weber as president of the party. Later in September 2025, Weber announced that the EPP will discuss the membership of SNS due to their response to the student-led anti-corruption protests. A month later, Vučević and Brnabić participated in a meeting with EPP leaders; N1 wrote that it is unlikely that the SNS would be punished. In preparations for the 2026 Serbian parliamentary election, Vučević expressed his support for Aleksandar Vučić's possible prime ministerial candidacy. After SNS lost the parliamentary elections, Vučević announced a party assembly for 13 December, nominating Vučić as the next party president.

== Political positions ==
Vučević has been described as a populist. He is a supporter of Aleksandar Vučić, the former president of Serbia and SNS, having described him as a "guarantor of peace and stability" (garant mira i stabilnosti). As mayor of Novi Sad, Vučević supported multiculturalist policies. In August 2021, he condemned the destruction of a billboard dedicated to Roma victims of the Holocaust. He is a self-described anti-fascist. Vučević has described lithium mining as a "historical opportunity for Serbia" (istorijska šansa za Srbiju).

=== Foreign policy ===
As minister of defence, Vučević declared that the government with him as minister favoured a policy of "peace and cooperation" (mira i saradnje). Vučević supports military neutrality, but he does not consider that to be an impediment to cooperation with NATO. Nonetheless, he considers the NATO bombing of Yugoslavia a war crime. He also supports increasing defence cooperation with the United States, as well as the participation of Serbia in United Nations and European Union peacekeeping operations. During his tenure, Serbia participated in missions in Cyprus, Lebanon, Central African Republic, Middle East, and Somalia. He also prioritised cooperation with KFOR. Vučević expressed support for the economic strengthening of the Serbian Army. He supports the reintroduction of mandatory military conscription.

Vučević is in favour of Serbia's accession to the European Union, at the same time claiming that Serbia cannot become its member by "being humiliated and ashamed, because then it will never be a good member of the EU" (tako što će biti ponižena i postiđena, jer onda nikada neće biti dobar član EU). He opposes introducing sanctions against Russia related to the invasion of Ukraine, but supports the territorial integrity of Ukraine. Vučević supported the Open Balkan initiative.

Regarding Kosovo, Vučević opposes its independence, calling it the "state-forming DNA of our people and our country". However, he supports negotiating with the government of Kosovo. Vučević has praised the "pragmatic" approach of the United States towards Kosovo.

=== Corruption ===
Vučević has described himself as a fighter against corruption. Despite this, he has been accused of corruption. Three criminal complaints were launched against Vučević, including a complaint from the Agency for the Fight Against Corruption, State Audit Institution, and an anonymous complaint sent to the Higher Public Prosecutor's Office in Novi Sad. Vučević is a close associate with controversial businessmen such as Andrej Vučić, Zvonko Veselinović, Slobodan Milutinović, Slobodan Milić, and Marko Bosanac; he has denied cooperating with Bosanac's businesses. In December 2022, the N1 television published a documentary on Vučević's alleged corruption connections.

In January 2025, Andrej Vučić and Vučević were mentioned in a Novi Sad money laundering case by investigative journalist organisation KRIK. Veselinović and Milutinović were also mentioned in the report. According to an anonymous criminal complaint, Vučević helped Milić by changing the planning documentation of his properties, which boosted Milić's property values; the city then bought the property for a higher value. Novaković alleged that Vučević helped Bosanac forge connections with Novi Sad public communal services, which left Bosanac with very high income. Vučević has described Andrej Vučić as the "brain" of SNS in Vojvodina and as one of the "most functional" (najfunkcionalnijih) individuals in SNS. Amidst the controversy regarding Jovanjica, Vučević submitted a criminal complaint against Aleksandar and Andrej Vučić in December 2019 to prove that they were not embroiled in the scandal. The judiciary dismissed the complaint in January 2020.

== Personal life ==
Vučević is married and has two children. He enjoys fishing in his free time. He is the recipient of multiple awards, including the Charter of Honorary Senator of the Senate of Economy of Serbia and the Order of Saint Bishop Maxim of the Eparchy of Srem. In December 2014, he also received the Captain Miša Anastasijević award, while in October 2022, he was awarded the Order of St. Sava by Patriarch Porfirije. Later in July 2023, he was awarded the Order of St. Stefan Štiljanović. He speaks English.

== Notes ==
Political offices
Preceded by Igor Pavličić	Mayor of Novi Sad; 2012–2022	Succeeded by Milan Đurić
Preceded by Zorana Mihajlović	Deputy Prime Minister of Serbia; 2022–2024	Succeeded by Aleksandar Vulin
Preceded by Nebojša Stefanović	Minister of Defence; 2022–2024	Succeeded by Bratislav Gašić
Preceded by Ana Brnabić	Prime Minister of Serbia; 2024–2025	Succeeded by Đuro Macut
Party political offices
Preceded by Aleksandar Vučić	Leader of the Serbian Progressive Party; 2023–present	Incumbent
