= Ivica Dačić =

Serbian politician (born 1966)

- Ивица Дачић
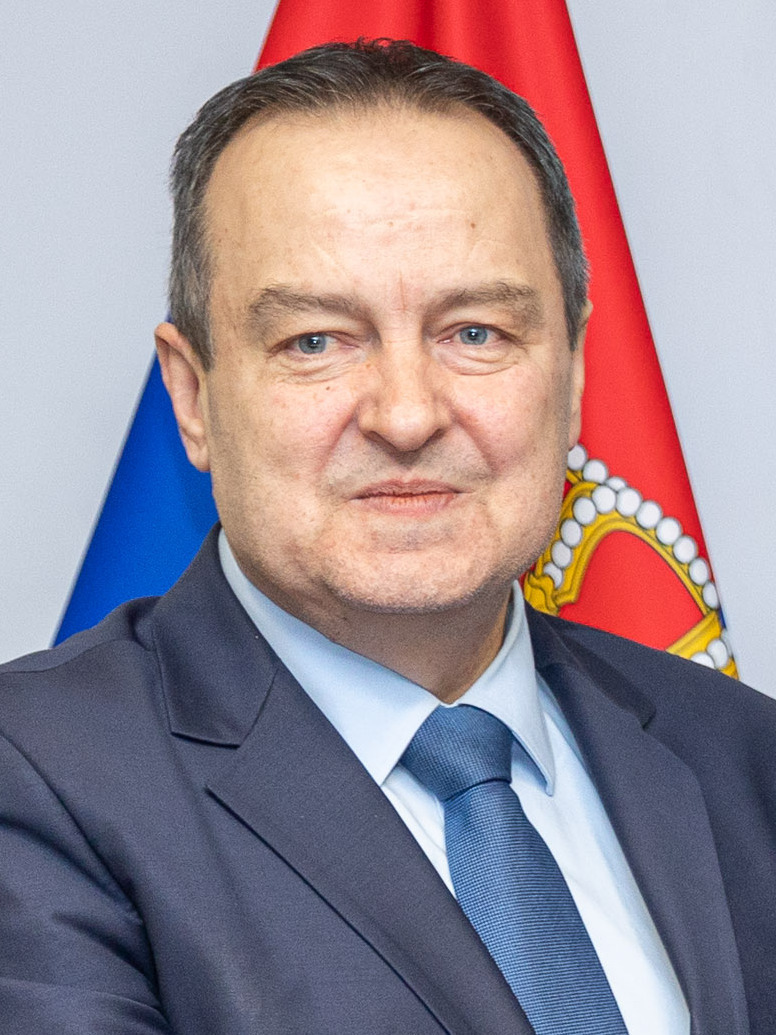
- Dačić in 2023

Minister of Internal Affairs
- Incumbent
- Assumed office 2 May 2024
- Prime Minister: Miloš Vučević; Đuro Macut
- Preceded by: Bratislav Gašić
- In office 7 July 2008 – 27 April 2014
- Prime Minister: Mirko Cvetković; Himself
- Preceded by: Mirjana Orašanin (acting)
- Succeeded by: Nebojša Stefanović

Deputy Prime Minister of Serbia
- Incumbent
- Assumed office 26 October 2022
- Prime Minister: Ana Brnabić; Himself (acting); Miloš Vučević; Đuro Macut
- Preceded by: Branko Ružić
- In office 27 April 2014 – 22 October 2020
- Prime Minister: Aleksandar Vučić; Himself (acting); Ana Brnabić
- Preceded by: Aleksandar Vučić
- Succeeded by: Branko Ružić
- In office 7 July 2008 – 27 July 2012
- Prime Minister: Mirko Cvetković
- Preceded by: Božidar Đelić
- Succeeded by: Aleksandar Vučić

Prime Minister of Serbia
- Acting; 20 March 2024 – 2 May 2024
- President: Aleksandar Vučić
- Preceded by: Ana Brnabić
- Succeeded by: Miloš Vučević
- Acting; 31 May 2017 – 29 June 2017
- President: Aleksandar Vučić
- Preceded by: Aleksandar Vučić
- Succeeded by: Ana Brnabić
- In office 27 July 2012 – 27 April 2014
- President: Tomislav Nikolić
- Deputy: Aleksandar Vučić (first); Jovan Krkobabić; Rasim Ljajić; Suzana Grubješić
- Preceded by: Mirko Cvetković
- Succeeded by: Aleksandar Vučić

Minister of Foreign Affairs
- In office 26 October 2022 – 2 May 2024
- Prime Minister: Ana Brnabić
- Preceded by: Nikola Selaković
- Succeeded by: Marko Đurić
- In office 27 April 2014 – 22 October 2020
- Prime Minister: Aleksandar Vučić; Himself (acting); Ana Brnabić
- Preceded by: Ivan Mrkić
- Succeeded by: Ana Brnabić (acting); Nikola Selaković

President of the National Assembly of Serbia
- In office 22 October 2020 – 1 August 2022
- Preceded by: Smilja Tišma (acting); Maja Gojković
- Succeeded by: Vladeta Janković (acting); Vladimir Orlić

Minister of Information
- In office 24 October 2000 – 25 January 2001; Served with Bogoljub Pejčić and Biserka Matić-Spasojević
- Prime Minister: Milomir Minić
- Preceded by: Aleksandar Vučić
- Succeeded by: Office abolished

Personal details
- Born: 1 January 1966 (age 60) Prizren, AP Kosovo and Metohija, SR Serbia, SFR Yugoslavia
- Party: SPS (1991–present)
- Spouse: Sanja Djaković Dačić
- Children: 2
- Education: University of Belgrade

Ivica Dačić (Note: Serbian Cyrillic: Ивица Дачић, pronounced [îʋitsa dâtʃitɕ]) (born 1 January 1966) is a Serbian politician who has served various governmental positions since 2008. He has been deputy prime minister of Serbia since 2022, having previously served that role from 2008 to 2012 and again from 2014 to 2020, and the minister of internal affairs since 2024, having previously served that role from 2008 to 2014. The leader of the Socialist Party of Serbia (SPS) since 2006, he was the prime minister of Serbia from 2012 to 2014 and president of the National Assembly of Serbia from 2020 to 2022.

Dačić graduated from the University of Belgrade in 1989 and joined SPS in 1991. He quickly rose up the ranks of the party, becoming its spokesman in 1992, under his mentor, Slobodan Milosević, President of Serbia and FR Yugoslavia. After the fall of Milošević, he served as the minister of information in a transitional government from 2000 to 2001. Dačić became SPS party leader in 2006. Like his predecessor Milošević, he is regarded as a pragmatic leader willing to change views based on circumstance and has worked to reform the party. Dačić led SPS into a government with the Democratic Party (DS) in 2008, after which he became the first deputy prime minister and minister of internal affairs, roles which he served until 2012. The DS–SPS government reached an EU candidate status. After the 2012 parliamentary election, SPS formed a coalition government with the Serbian Progressive Party (SNS); Dačić was elected prime minister. The SNS–SPS government pursued the European Union to start formal negotiations for the accession of Serbia and he signed the Brussels Agreement on the normalisation of relations of governments of Serbia and Kosovo.

In 2014, he returned to being the first deputy prime minister and also became the minister of foreign affairs, roles which he served until 2020. Dačić was elected president of the National Assembly after the 2020 parliamentary election and was succeeded by Vladimir Orlić in 2022. Commentators described his political positions as populist and nationalist.

== Early life ==
Dačić was born on 1 January 1966 in Prizren, which at the time was part of the Socialist Republic of Serbia within Yugoslavia. Dačić was born to a Serbian family and was brought up in Žitorađa. His father, Desimir, was a police officer, and his mother, Jelisaveta ("Jela"), was a housewife. His parents were both born in villages under the Jastrebac. When Ivica was six months old, the family moved to Žitorađa. He has a sister, Emica. At the age of 5, he was featured in the newspapers in the article "Enciklopedija u kratkim pantalonama" (Encyclopaedia in shorts) as he had learnt to read and write himself, knew the names of many mountains, rivers and capitals, nearly all notable football players and results of matches.

His childhood nickname was Bucko and his classmates at secondary school in Žitorađa described him as very intelligent for his age - he reportedly managed to often amaze his teachers with his knowledge and wit. He played handball and football and associated with everyone at his school. In the state-run history-contest named "Tito, revolucija, mir", which was held in all republics, Dačić won over 600 others. The family was described as humble and not wealthy, and as they lived off one paycheck, the parents picked mushrooms and dog rose in order to send Ivica and his sister to school. The parents sold the house in Žitorađa in 2010 and moved to Prokuplje, Desimir had until some years ago driven a 1977 Zastava 750.

He went to high school in Niš, where he excelled with the highest grades (5), and graduated from the University of Belgrade's Faculty of Political Sciences, with a degree in journalism in 1989, with a highest medium grade of 10, and also won the award for the best student of scientific achievements. His sister Emica has degrees in pedagogy and drama. He was in the faculty organisation Association of Communists, and in 1990 he was elected the first president of the Young Socialists of Belgrade.

== Political career ==
=== Early years ===
At the beginning of the 1990s, he was an editor for the short-lived newspapers of the Socialist Party of Serbia (SPS), "Epoha". He became a member of SPS in the middle of 1991. He was the head of the Information and Propaganda staff of the SPS during the elections in 1992 and 1993, and then a minister of the Citizens' council in the first assembly of the Federal Republic of Yugoslavia, and member of the executive committee of the Main Board (IO GO) and vice-president of the Council for Information and Propaganda of the SPS. He was appointed member of IO GO on the second congress of SPS on 26 October 1992, with the most won votes.

In the mid-1990s, Milošević's wife Mirjana Marković moved Dačić to a small office in a Belgrade suburb in order to curb his growing ambitions. Dačić was appointed member of IO GO again in the next congress in 1996, when there were major personnel changes in the party leadership, and of 27 members of IO GO, voted in 1992, only 5 remained, including Dačić. He was the spokesman of SPS for 8 years, between 1992 and 2000. In 1996, Dačić was a minister in the Citizens' Council of the Assembly of Yugoslavia and President of the Committee on Public Information, and in 1997 he was member of the Committee on Foreign Relations. In April 1999, the federal government appointed him a member of the Board of Tanjug, and in early May, as President of the Federal Council of the public institution RTV Yugoslavia.

=== President of the SPS Main Board and 2004 elections ===
He was elected President of the Belgrade Socialists on 10 February 2000, and again on 5 December 2000 in the election conference of the City Board of SPS. Following the Bulldozer Revolution on 5 October 2000, Milošević was arrested by Serbian police on 31 March 2001, and was eventually transferred to The Hague to be prosecuted by the ICTY.

In the transitional government, from October 2000 to January 2001, Dačić was the co-minister of Information alongside Biserka Matić (DOS) and Bogoljub Pejčić (SPO). On 24 September 2000 he was elected the minister of the Citizens' Council of the Assembly of Yugoslavia, and then member of the Committee on Security and Foreign Policy in both federal assemblies. Dačić reformed the party with his assembling of a team of young moderates, while retaining some of the former figures to satisfy the elderly ex-communists.

Dačić was the President of the Main Board of the SPS and was the vice-president of the SPS from 2000 to 2003, and federal deputy in the Chamber of Citizens of the Federal Assembly of the Federal Republic of Yugoslavia and Assembly of the State Union of Serbia and Montenegro from 1992 to 2004. In the sixth congress of SPS, on 18 January 2003, Dačić was elected the President of the Main Board of SPS. Since 2003, he was deputy in the parliament, and head of the parliamentary group of SPS.

He was the party's presidential candidate in the 2004 election and placed fifth with 125,952 votes (4,04%).

=== Party leadership ===
He was elected President of the Socialist Party on the seventh congress on 4 December 2006, winning over candidate Milorad Vučelić in the second round with 1,287 points, versus 792 points, of the delegates votes. In 2007, he was the President of the Committee on Security of the Parliament. On 7 July 2008, the government appointed Dačić the first Deputy Prime Minister and Minister of the Police. He became a member of the Parliamentary Assembly of the Council of Europe (PACE).

In 2008, the Socialists were back in power as partners of the Democrats in the For a European Serbia-electoral alliance, led by Boris Tadić, after the 2008 Serbian parliamentary election; the Democrats were the main party that had helped oust Milošević. Dačić supported Serbia's EU ambitions.

In August 2010, Dačić and his family were under police protection after threats by the Serbian mafia. In 2012, the Security Intelligence Agency (Serbia's intelligence agency) received information that drug boss Darko Šarić had offered 10 million € to assassinate Tadić and Dačić.

=== 2012 elections, Prime Minister ===
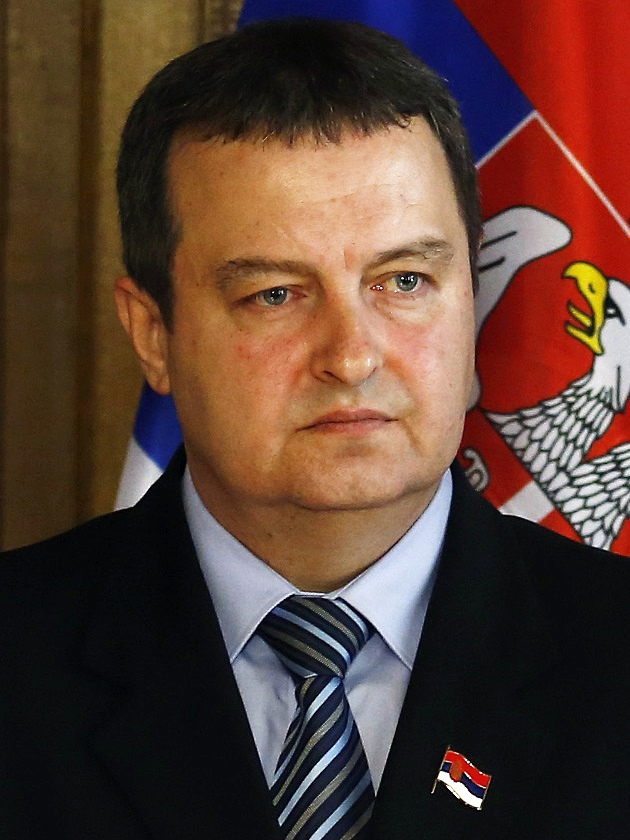
Dačić in 2013

The Socialist Party entered a coalition with the Party of United Pensioners of Serbia (PUPS), and United Serbia. In the 2012 parliamentary election the Socialist Party's coalition had come third with 556.013 votes, 14.53%, 44 seats; The Serbian Progressive Party (SNS), led by Tomislav Nikolić, beat the Democratic Party of Tadić in both the parliamentary and 2012 presidential election. Of the results, Dačić said "We have risen from the ashes" after the Party had doubled their results from the previous election. After weeks of negotiations, the Socialist Party left the alliance with the Democrats in favour of the Serbian Progressive Party. Nikolić offered the Prime Minister post to Dačić, and on 28 June 2012, Dačić received a mandate to form a new Government of Serbia. Dačić assumed office on 27 July. He said at a reception: "In this chamber there are many who toppled us in 2000, and I thank them, for if they hadn't toppled us we wouldn't have changed, realised our mistakes and we wouldn't be standing here today.".

The government included the SPS and SNS, along with several smaller parties, headed by Nikolić, a former nationalist. The election has triggered some unease, as it marks the return of power of Milošević's allies. Dačić has worked on transforming the party since taking over after Milošević, proclaiming a pro-EU path, and abandoning Milošević's nationalist policies. The stagnant economy has resulted in Dačić set to forming an "economic recovery council" by the end of August. The Serbian parliament elected Jorgovanka Tabaković (SNS) as new central bank governor.

== Policies ==
Upon becoming prime minister, he faced the challenges of a declining economy and Serbia's accession to the EU. Speaking to Parliament, he said that unemployment and economic recovery were the state's main priorities.

=== Foreign relations ===
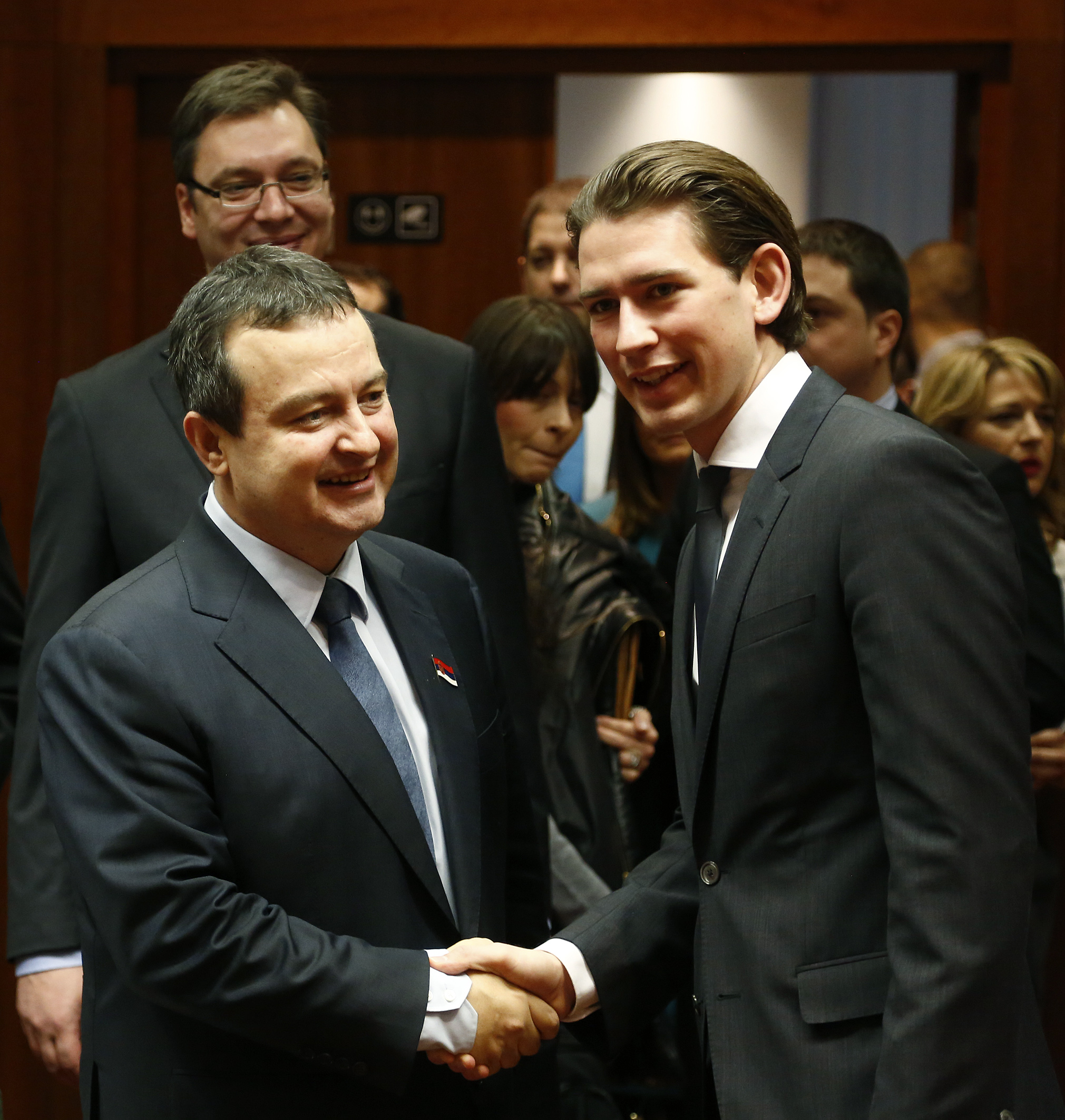
Dačić with Austrian Foreign Minister Sebastian Kurz, 21 January 2014

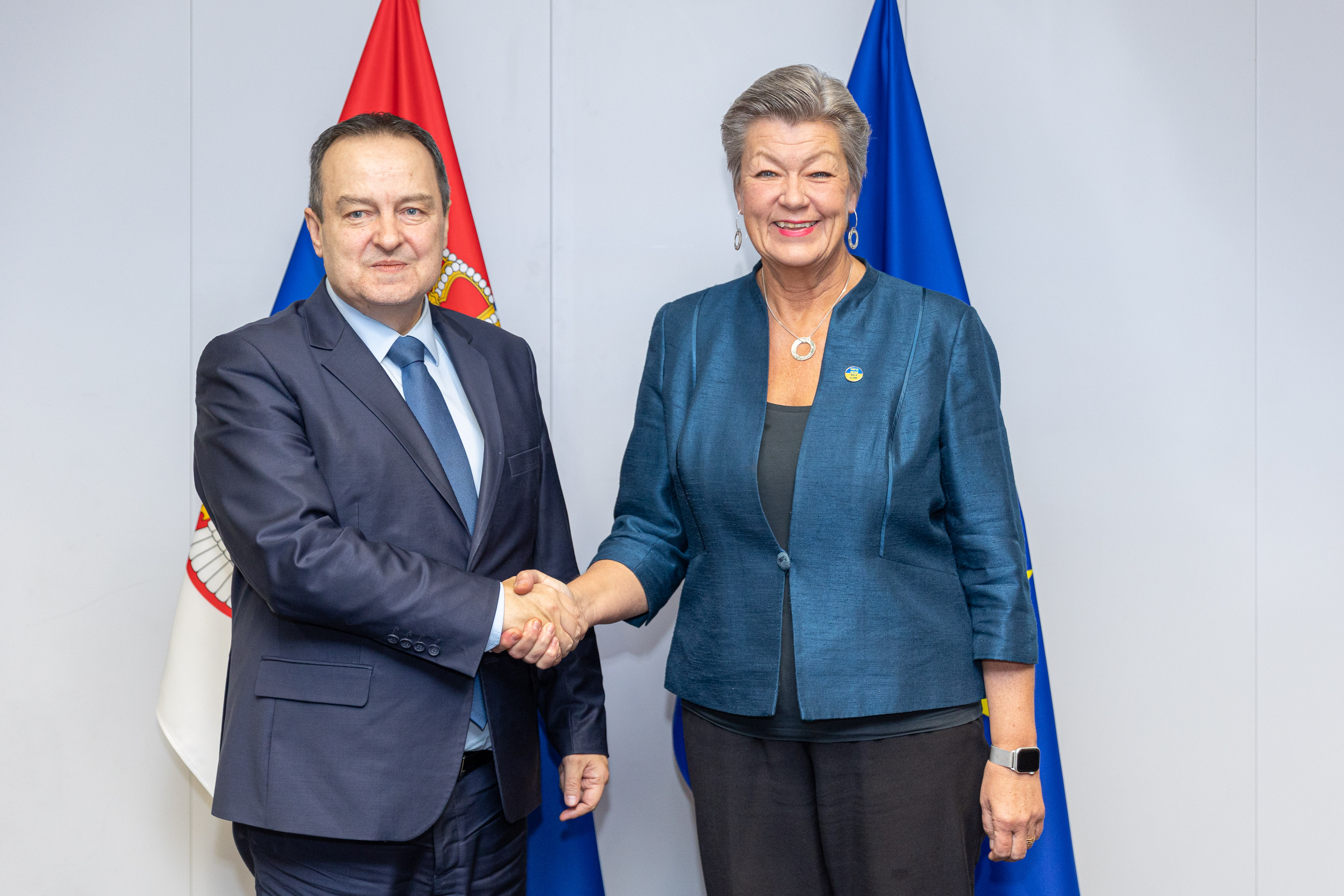
Dačić with European Commissioners Ylva Johansson, 24 January 2023

He has said that Serbia will "co-operate with all the countries of the world, advocate security, stability and good relations in the western Balkans and hold out its hand in reconciliation".

==== EU membership ====
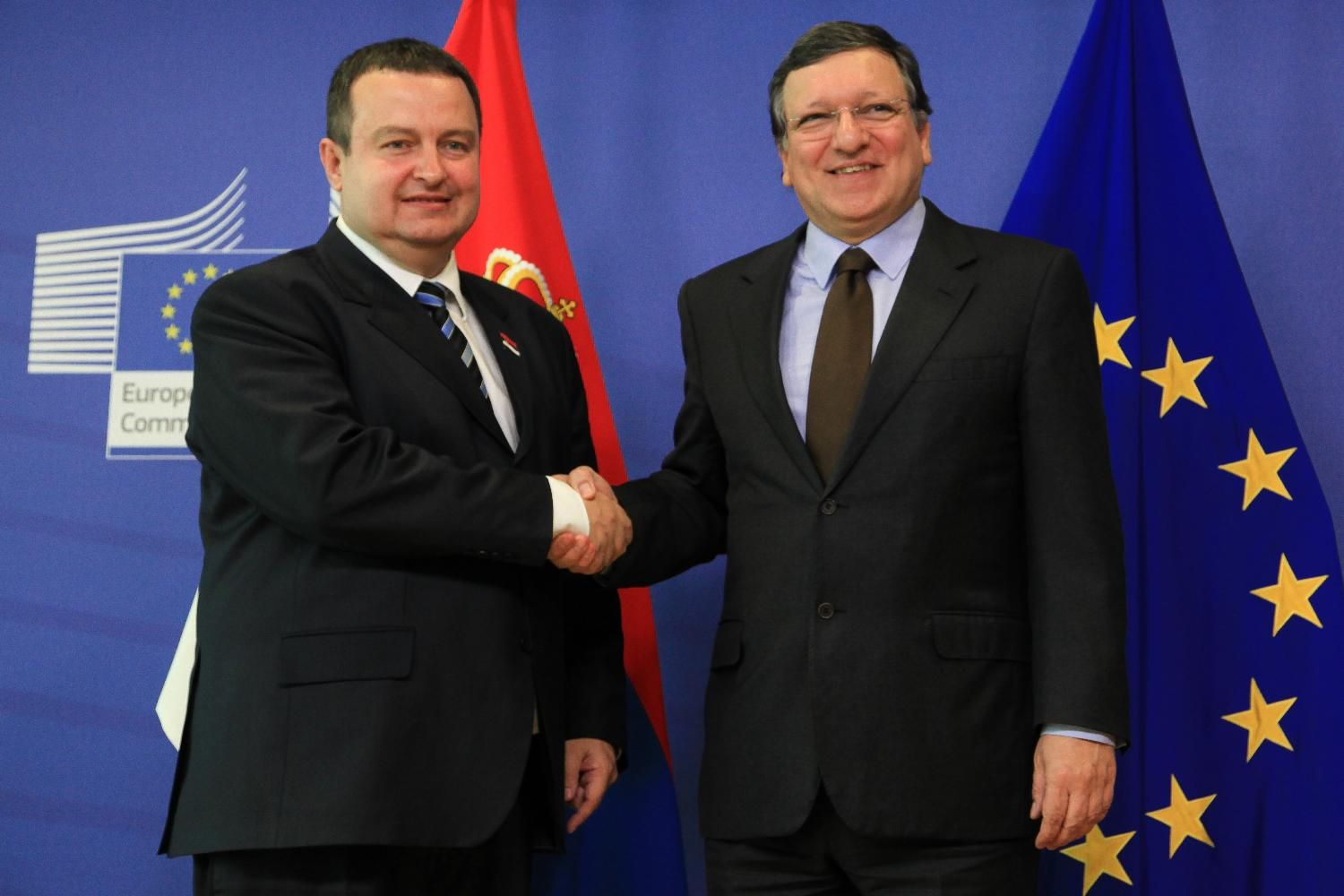
Dačić with President of the European Commission José Manuel Barroso, 28 June 2013

Serbia earned EU candidate status under Tadić's government, and Dačić has said that the new government will implement everything the previous government had accepted in the EU talks. Dačić supporters claim his pro-EU stance is evident in the handover of Radovan Karadžić and Ratko Mladić under his tenure as Interior Minister, and his role in the visa-free travel for Serbs in the EU. Following the European Council's confirmation on 28 June 2013 that formal negotiations for the accession of Serbia to the EU could begin, Dačić announced that the Serbian government would remain continuously in session with the aim of completing the talks as quickly as possible. He emphasised that harmonisation with European laws is an integral part of the government's plan for boosting investment and employment.

=== Status of Kosovo ===
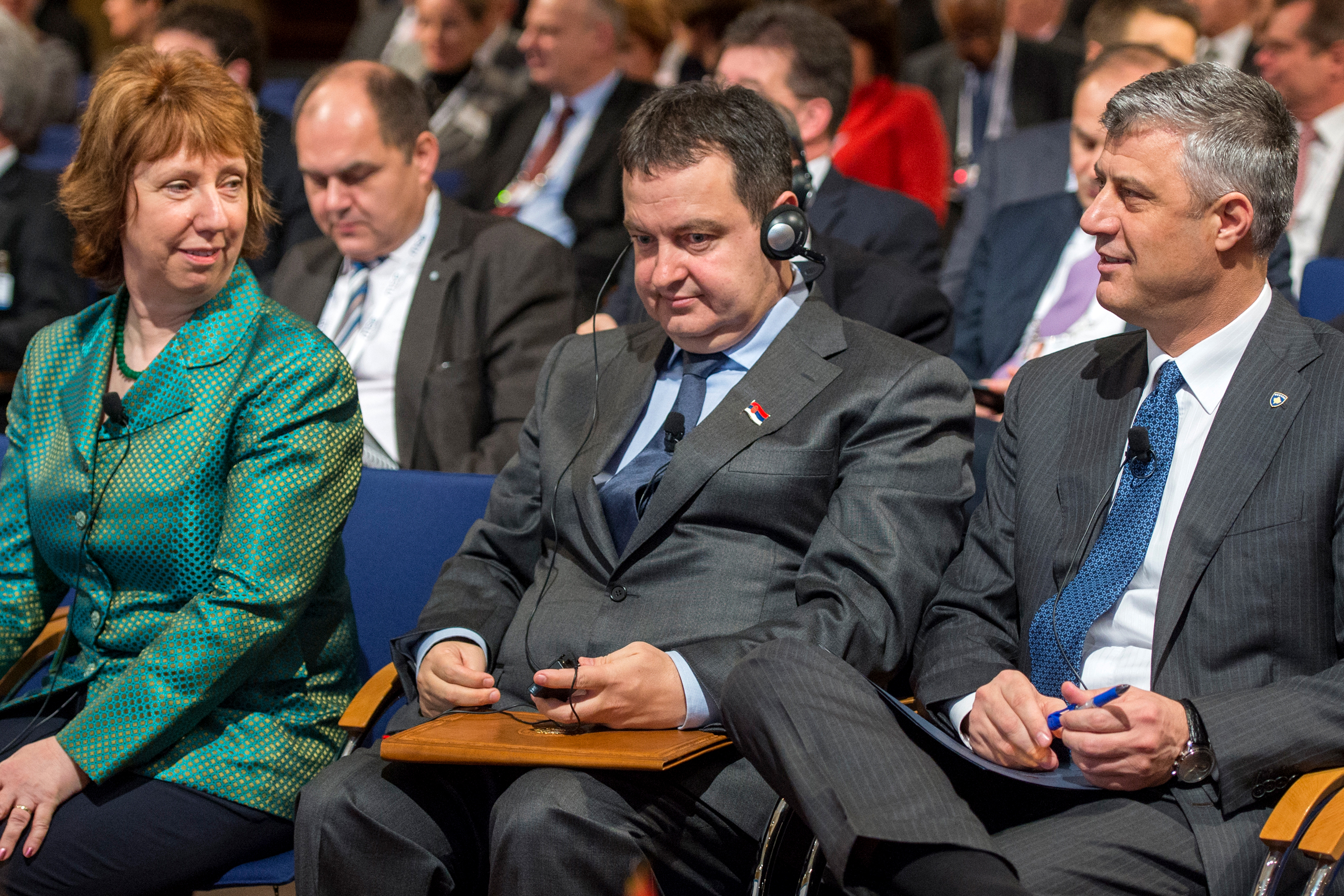
Dačić alongside European Commission First Vice-president Catherine Ashton (left) and Kosovar Prime Minister Hashim Thaçi, 2 February 2014

On 17 February 2008, the Assembly of Kosovo declared independence. It was the second declaration of independence by Kosovo's Albanian-majority political institutions, the first having been proclaimed on 7 September 1991. The legality of the declaration, and indeed whether it was an act of the Assembly, was disputed by the government of Serbia. Serbia sought international validation and support for its stance, and in October 2008 Serbia requested an advisory opinion on the matter from the International Court of Justice. The Court determined that the declaration of independence was legal.

In 2006, upon being elected party leader, Dačić said that he had no problem fighting for Kosovo as he had done it before. Although the recognition of Kosovo by Serbia might not be a requirement for Serbia's EU accession, the EU opposes any partition of Kosovo into ethnic entities. In May 2011, he said that partition of Kosovo would be the "only realistic solution".

On 25 July 2011, the North Kosovo crisis began when the Kosovo Police crossed into the Serb-controlled municipalities of North Kosovo, in an attempt to control several border crossings without the consultation of either Serbia or KFOR/EULEX. Though tensions between the two sides eased somewhat after the intervention of NATO's KFOR forces, they continued to remain high amid concern from the EU, who also blamed Kosovo for the unilateral provocation.

On 24 November 2011, Dačić said that he saw the Republic of Kosovo's incident with Serbs in North Kosovo as an attack on Serbia. The BBC claimed the "nationalist" leanings of Kosovo-born Dačić raise speculation on the policy towards the Kosovo issue, which may implicate on Serbia's EU application.

Dačić's stance has since dramatically changed; in February 2013 he met Hashim Thaçi, the Prime Minister of Kosovo, in Brussels for the most important in a series of talks. On 19 April 2013, Dačić and his government took another step towards normalising relations between Kosovo and Serbia. In March 2013, Dačić said that while his government would never recognise Kosovo's independence, "lies were told that Kosovo is ours" and that Serbia needed to define its "real borders".

=== Economy ===
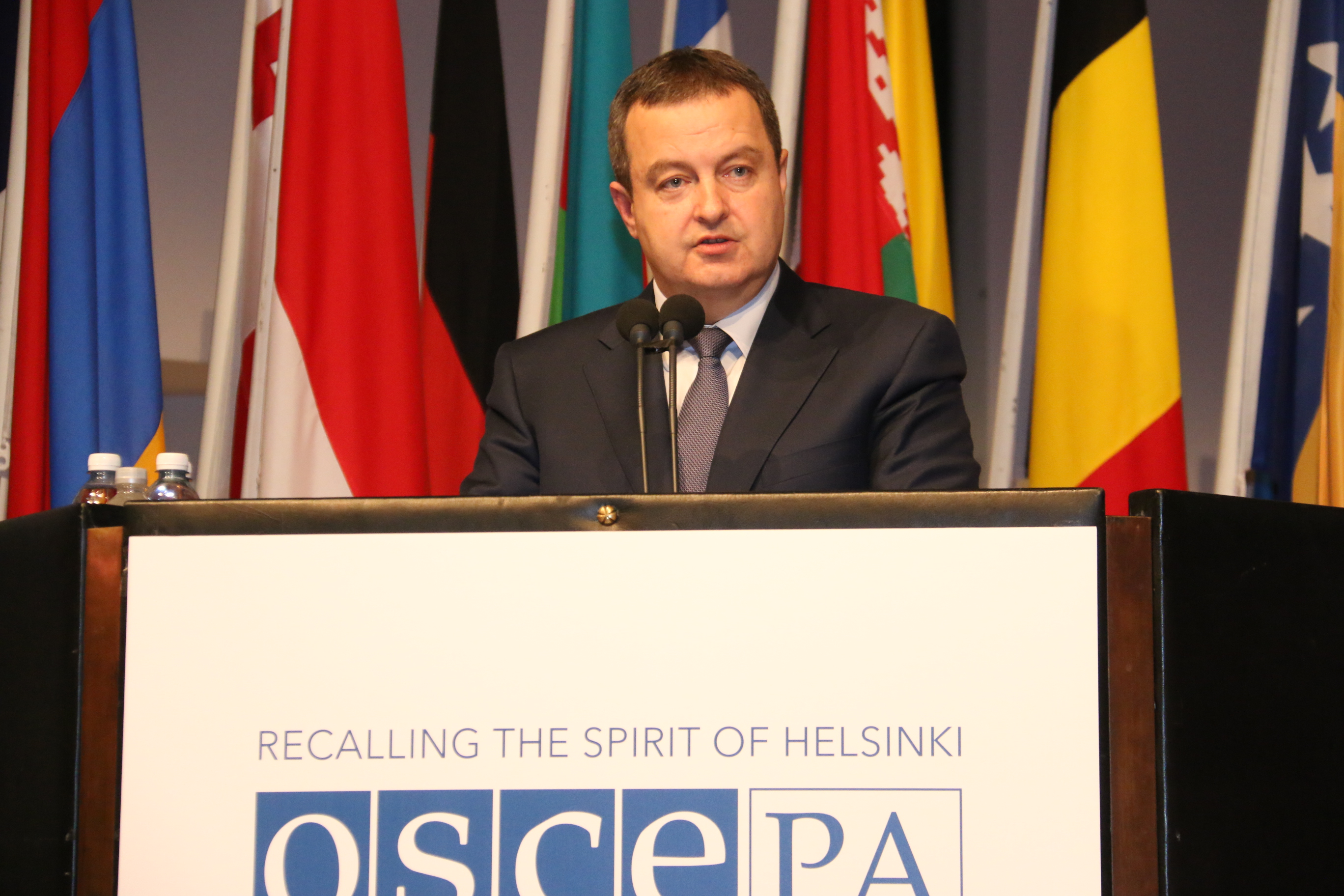
Dačić addressing the OSCE Parliamentary Assembly in Helsinki, 9 July 2015

The Socialist-controlled gas monopoly Srbijagas which entered into partnership with Russian oil giant Gazprom during the coalition government with the Democratic Party. On 12 July, Dačić called the Serbian financial sector "the greatest enemy of the people". The stagnant economy has resulted in Dačić set to forming an "economic recovery council" by the end of August. Dejan Šoškić was replaced as Governor of National Bank of Serbia by Jorgovanka Tabaković on 6 August 2012.

== Protege of Slobodan Milošević ==
Because he was a high-profile spokesman for Milošević, he received the nickname "Little Sloba" after his mentor. Dačić said that the Socialist Party he inherited from Milošević made mistakes, but he still revered Milošević. He said, regarding his history with Milošević: "The past is of no interest to me because I cannot change it but we can do something to change our country's future."

Nenad Sebek, executive director of the Centre for Reconciliation and Democracy think-tank said "Dačić is one of the most intelligent and cunning politicians in Serbia [...] Without ever saying sorry for what his party did during the 1990s under Milošević, Dačić single-handedly returned the Socialists to the political mainstream in Serbia." Sebek continued: "He is extremely smart and likely to be very cooperative when negotiating with the international community, but he's still an eyesore for anyone who doesn't have the memory of a goldfish."

The EU had earlier listed Dačić among persons in Milošević's circle prohibited from entering the EU.

== Personal life ==
Dačić's wife is named Sanja Đaković Dačić. He has two children, a son named Luka and a daughter named Andrea. Dačić was a licensed amateur radio operator and former President of KK Partizan Sport Association of Serbia. He was also vice-president of the Olympic Committee of FR Yugoslavia. He was appointed President of RK Partizan on 23 June 2007. His father, Desimir, died on 30 January 2018.

== Awards ==
- "Najevropljanin" (Best European), for European integration of Serbia in 2009.
- "Bambini", for his work on European integration in 2010, awarded in 2011 by the Association of Young Academics, Germany.
- The Sports Association of Serbia recognised Dačić and Novak Djokovic in 2011 for their contributions to Sport in Serbia.
- "Golden Sign of the Police of Republika Srpska", for cooperation between the Serbian Police and Republika Srpska Police, awarded on 28 April 2012 in Banja Luka.
- Order of the Republika Srpska, 2022
- Order of the Holy New Martyrs of Kragujevac, 2025

== See also ==
- List of foreign ministers in 2017
- Ivica Dačić – Prime Minister of Serbia

Party political offices
New office	Spokesperson of the Socialist Party; 1992–2000	Succeeded by Branko Ružić
Preceded by Slobodan Milošević	President of the Socialist Party; 2006–present	Incumbent
Political offices
Preceded by Aleksandar Vučić	Minister of Information; 2000–2001; Served alongside: Biserka Matić and Bogoljub Pejčić	Succeeded by Branislav Lečić as Minister of Culture
Preceded by Božidar Đelić	First Deputy Prime Minister of Serbia; 2008–2012	Succeeded by Aleksandar Vučić
Preceded by Mirjana Orašanin; Acting	Minister of the Interior; 2008–2014	Succeeded by Nebojša Stefanović
Preceded by Mirko Cvetković	Prime Minister of Serbia; 2012–2014	Succeeded by Aleksandar Vučić
Preceded by Ivan Mrkić	Minister of Foreign Affairs; 2014–2020	Succeeded by Nikola Selaković
Preceded by Aleksandar Vučić	First Deputy Prime Minister of Serbia; 2014–2020	Succeeded by Branko Ružić
Preceded by Aleksandar Vučić	Prime Minister of Serbia; Acting; 2017	Succeeded by Ana Brnabić
Preceded by Maja Gojković	President of the National Assembly; 2020–2022	Succeeded by Vladimir Orlić
Preceded by Nikola Selaković	Minister of Foreign Affairs; 2022–2024	Succeeded by Marko Đurić
Preceded by Bratislav Gašić	Minister of the Interior; 2024–present	Incumbent
Sporting positions
Preceded by Boriša Vuković	President of the KK Partizan; 1999–2000	Succeeded by Vlade Divac
