= Zoran Ostojić =

Serbian politician

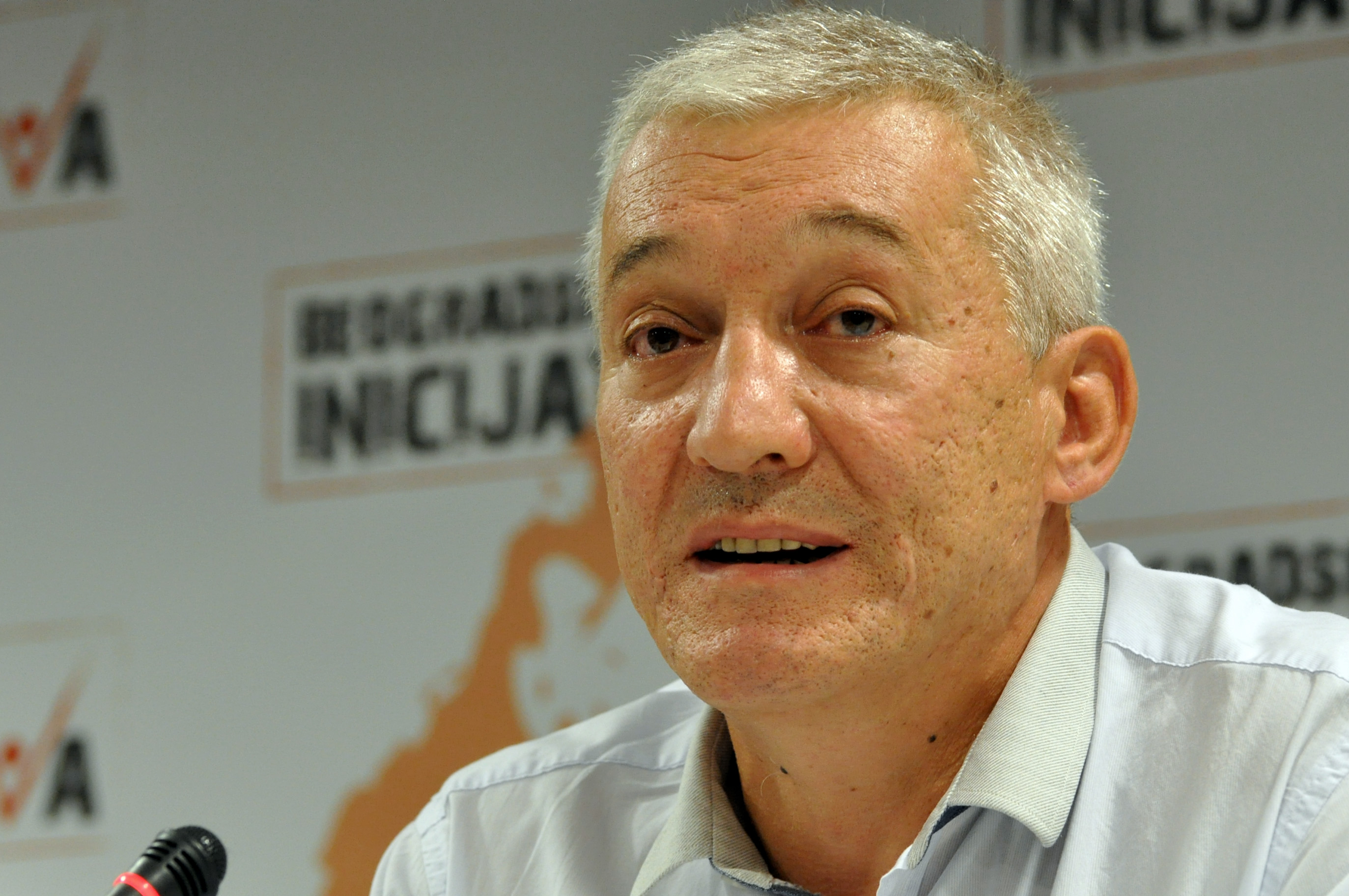
Ostojić in 2013

Zoran Ostojić (Serbian Cyrillic: Зоран Остојић; born 25 October 1956) is a journalist and politician in Serbia. He was a member of the National Assembly of Serbia from 2008 to 2014, serving for most of this time as a member of the Liberal Democratic Party (Liberalno demokratska partija, LDP). He was previously a prominent journalist with RTV Studio B and served as the station's director from February to October 1997.

== Early life and journalism career ==
Ostojić was born in Ub, in what was then the People's Republic of Serbia in the Federal People's Republic of Yugoslavia. He graduated from the University of Belgrade Faculty of Economics and initially worked at Studio B from 1986 to 1993 as a journalist, editor, and presenter. He left the station in December 1993 and moved to Chicago in the United States of America, where he lived from 1994 to 1997. During this time, Serbia was governed by Slobodan Milošević and his allies; Ostojić was aligned with the country's democratic opposition.

The opposition Zajedno ("Together") alliance won a majority victory in the 1996 Serbian local elections in Belgrade; after an extended standoff, the Milošević government accepted the opposition's victory in February 1997. Ostojić returned from Chicago to Belgrade in February 1997 on being appointed as Studio B director at the nomination of the Serbian Renewal Movement (Srpski pokret obnove, SPO), one of the constituent parties in Zajedno.

The Zajedno alliance broke up later in 1997, and the SPO formed a new administration in Belgrade through an informal alliance with Milošević's Socialist Party of Serbia (Socijalistička partija Srbije, SPS). Ostojić fell out of favour with the revamped city government; he was dismissed as director on 1 October 1997 and was fired from Studio B outright in December 1997. He subsequently formed the breakaway PG Network with other former Studio B journalists. With the fall of the Milošević regime in October 2000 and the landslide victory of the opposition in the 2000 Serbian local elections in Belgrade, Ostojić returned to Studio B, serving as president of its management board from 2000 to 2003.

As of 2021, Ostojić is a columnist for Danas.

== Politician ==
Ostojić was a member of the Civic Alliance of Serbia (Građanski savez Srbije, GSS) in the mid-2000s. This party contested the 2007 Serbian parliamentary election on the LDP's electoral list, and Ostojić appeared in the 152nd position (out of 250). The list won fifteen mandates, and he was not included in his party's delegation. (From 2000 to 2011, Serbian parliamentary mandates were awarded to sponsoring parties or coalitions rather than to individual candidates, and it was common practice for mandates to be assigned out of numerical order. Ostojić could have been awarded a mandate despite his low position on the list – which was in any event mostly alphabetical – though in the event he was not.)

The GSS merged into the LDP after the 2007 election. Ostojić appeared on the LDP's list in the 2008 parliamentary election and was awarded a mandate when the list won thirteen seats. The results of the election were initially inconclusive, but the For a European Serbia alliance led by the Democratic Party (Demokratska stanka, DS) eventually formed a new government in an alliance with the SPS and other parties, and the LDP served in opposition. Ostojić was a frequent spokesperson for his party on issues related to the state of the Serbian media. In 2011, he accused the DS of attempting to control the country's print media resources.

Serbia's electoral law was reformed in 2011, such that mandates were awarded in numerical order to candidates on successful lists. The LDP contested the 2012 parliamentary election as part of the Preokret ("U-Turn") alliance; Ostojić appeared on its list in the nineteenth position and was elected to a second term when the alliance won exactly nineteen seats. The Serbian Progressive Party (Srpska napredna stranka, SNS) formed a new administration after the election with the SPS and other parties, and the LDP continued to serve in opposition. Ostojić was critical of the new government's decision to dismiss Dejan Šoškić as government of the National Bank of Serbia in July 2012. Later in the year, he called for better relations between the governments of Serbia and Kosovo, arguing that the preamble to the Constitution of Serbia should not be an impediment to negotiations.

Ostojić left the LDP parliamentary group in 2013 and formed a civic initiative called the Belgrade Initiative. He aligned this group with the United Regions of Serbia (Ujedinjeni regioni Srbije, URS), appearing in the twenty-eighth position on that party's list in the 2014 parliamentary election. The list did not cross the electoral threshold to win representation in the assembly.

He appeared in the sixteenth position on the United Democratic Serbia (Ujedinjena demokratska Srbija, UDS) list in the 2020 parliamentary election. This list, too, did not cross the threshold to win any mandates.

Ostojić has also sought election in Belgrade on a number of occasions. He appeared on the LDP's list for both the City Assembly of Belgrade and the New Belgrade municipal assembly in the 2008 Serbian local elections, although he did not take a mandate at either level. He was elected to the New Belgrade assembly on the Preokret list in the 2012 Serbian local elections after receiving the second position; the list won four seats. He also appeared in the tenth position on the LDP list for the Belgrade city assembly in 2012 and the fourth position on the URS list in 2014 Belgrade City Assembly election. Neither of the latter lists crossed the relevant electoral threshold.
