= Diana Dragutinović =

Serbian politician and economist

- Диана Драгутиновић
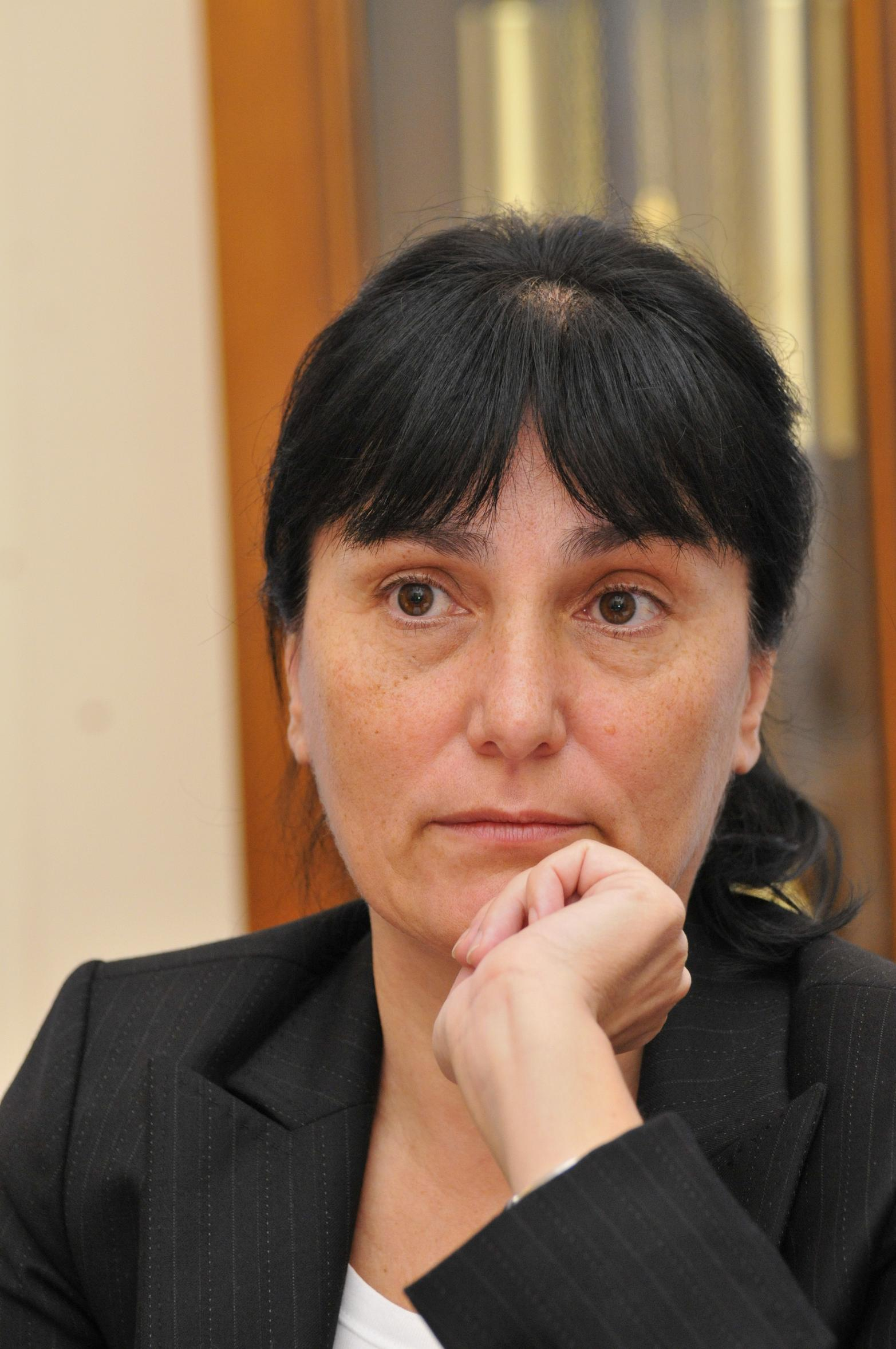
- Dragutinović in 2010

Vice Governor of the National Bank of Serbia
- Incumbent
- Assumed office 15 March 2011
- Governor: Dejan Šoškić; Jorgovanka Tabaković

Minister of Finance
- In office 7 July 2008 – 14 March 2011
- Preceded by: Mirko Cvetković
- Succeeded by: Mirko Cvetković

Vice Governor of the National Bank of Serbia
- In office 1 September 2004 – 7 July 2008
- Governor: Radovan Jelašić

Personal details
- Born: 6 May 1958 (age 67) Belgrade, Serbia, FPR Yugoslavia
- Party: Democratic Party

Diana Dragutinović (Serbian Cyrillic: Диана Драгутиновић; born 6 May 1958) is a Serbian economist, who was Minister of Finance in the Government of Serbia from 2008 to 2011.

== Biography ==
Dragutinović graduated from the University of Belgrade Faculty of Economics where she also received an MSc and a PhD and still lectures. From 2001 to 2002, she was special advisor at the Ministry of Finance and Economy, as well as a special advisor at the International Monetary Fund (2002–04).

From 1 September 2004 she was the vice governor of the National Bank of Serbia to Radovan Jelašić, in charge of coordination and management of research and statistics, monetary policy and payment systems.

Her main areas of research are macroeconomics, econometric modelling, financial programming, long-term economic growth theory, convergence analysis, inflation, monetary and fiscal policy, poverty and social policy.

Dragutinović was elected to the position of Minister for Finance on 7 July 2008. During the reconstruction of Cvetković's Government on 14 March 2011, she was dismissed from the position of Minister for Finance. Following that, she returned to the National Bank of Serbia and reclaimed the position of the vice governor of the National Bank of Serbia, under Governor Dejan Šoškić and retaining the same position under Governor Jorgovanka Tabaković as well.

== Personal life ==
She is the author of textbooks, ten monographs and over 50 studies, articles and papers.

She is married and a mother of two children.

Political offices
Preceded by Mirko Cvetković	Minister of Finance of Serbia; 2008–2011	Succeeded by Mirko Cvetković
