= Radovan Jelašić =

Hungarian-Serbian economist

- Радован Јелашић
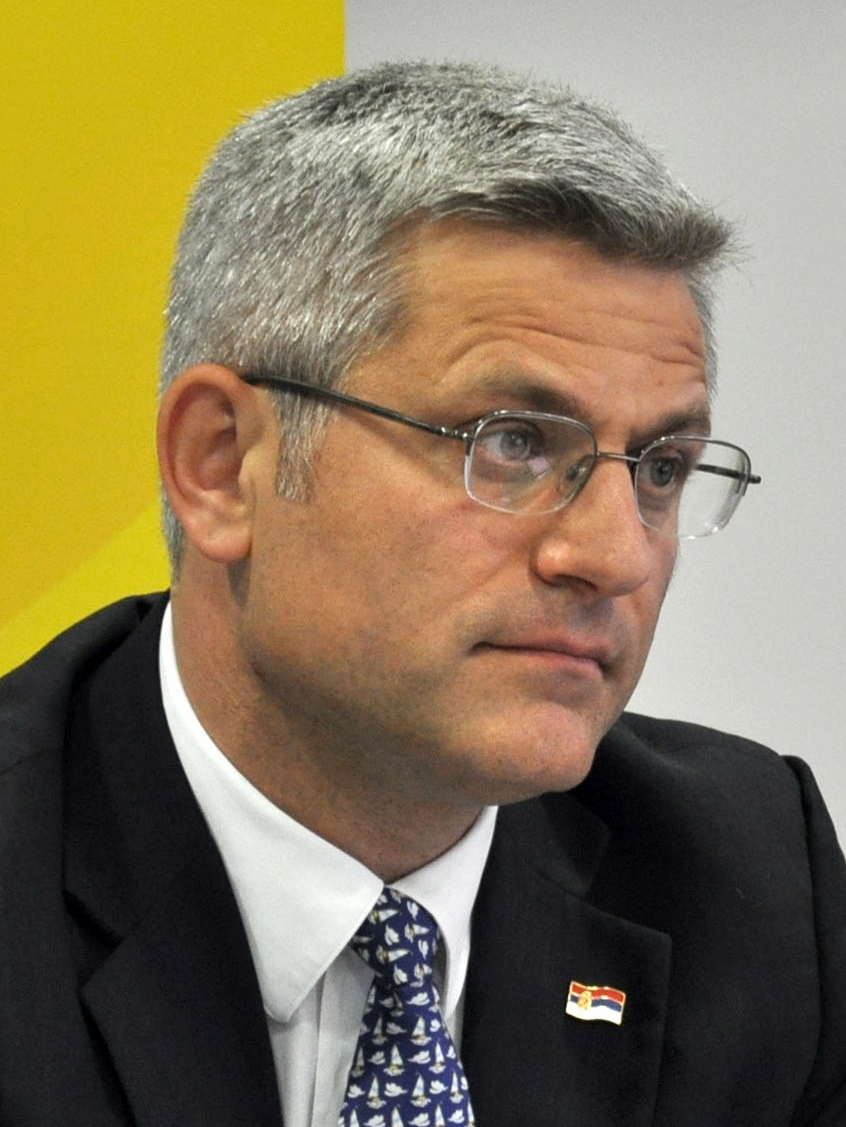
- Jelašić in 2009

Governor of the National Bank of Serbia
- In office 25 February 2004 – 28 July 2010
- Deputy: Bojan Marković; Ana Gligorijević; Mira Erić-Jović; Diana Dragutinović
- Preceded by: Kori Udovički
- Succeeded by: Dejan Šoškić

Personal details
- Born: Jelasity Radován; 19 February 1968 (age 58) Baja, Hungary
- Education: University of Belgrade (BEcon); University of Illinois at Chicago (MBA)
- Profession: Economist
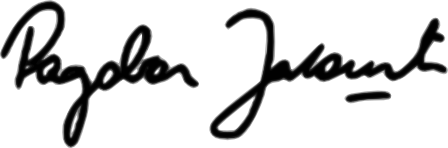
- Signature

Radovan Jelašić (Serbian Cyrillic: Радован Јелашић; Hungarian: Jelasity Radován; born 19 February 1968) is a Hungarian-Serbian economist who served as the Governor of the National Bank of Serbia from 2004 to 2010. He has been the CEO of Erste Bank Hungary since June 2011 and is also the chairman of the Hungarian Banking Association.

== Biography ==
Jelašić completed his secondary education at Nikola Tesla Serbian School in Budapest. In 1992, Jelašić graduated from the University of Belgrade Faculty of Economics and went on to obtain a master's degree of Business in Finance at the University of Illinois at Chicago.

Jelašić began his banking career with Deutsche Bank in Frankfurt, where he worked for four years as a Regional Manager for Central and Eastern Europe. In 1999 he moved to McKinsey & Company in Frankfurt, working on banking projects in Germany, Poland and Bulgaria. The projects were related to credit financing, privatization, corporate takeovers, organizational restructuring, corporate financing and preparation of mortgage strategies.

From December 2000 until July 2003 Mr. Jelašić held the position of Vice-Governor of the National Bank of Yugoslavia/Serbia and was in charge of development and implementation of banking sector restructuring, reform of the banking supervision process, negotiations with the International Monetary Fund, World Bank and European Union on programs related to the financial sector, as well as reorganization of the NBS IT Department. He also worked on the founding of the special department to help finance small and medium-size enterprises, and organization of technical help to the National Bank of Serbia.

Jelašić briefly accepted an engagement with the HVB banka in Belgrade.

On 25 February 2004, the National Assembly of the Republic of Serbia appointed Jelašić Governor of the National Bank of Serbia. He began his term in office on 1 March 2004.

In the first part of 2005, Jelašić became a subject of controversy in regards to his claim that he bought his 180m² villa together with the surrounding 15.5ar of land in the elite Belgrade neighbourhood of Dedinje for only €380,000. The story was pursued throughout 2005 by the daily tabloid Kurir, which quoted various experts who appraised the estate's worth to at least €1.5 million.

He resigned on 23 March 2010, however his resignation was adopted by National assembly on 28 July 2010.

In 2011, Jelašić was included as one of the subjects in the book "Serbia: Faces & Places".

He is currently occupying the position of CEO at Erste Bank in Budapest, Hungary.

In 2017 he became a member in the general council of the Hellenic Financial Stability Fund.

Government offices
Preceded by Kori Udovički	Governor of the National Bank of Serbia; 2004–2010	Succeeded by Dejan Šoškić
