= Rushka Bergman =

Stylist and costume designer

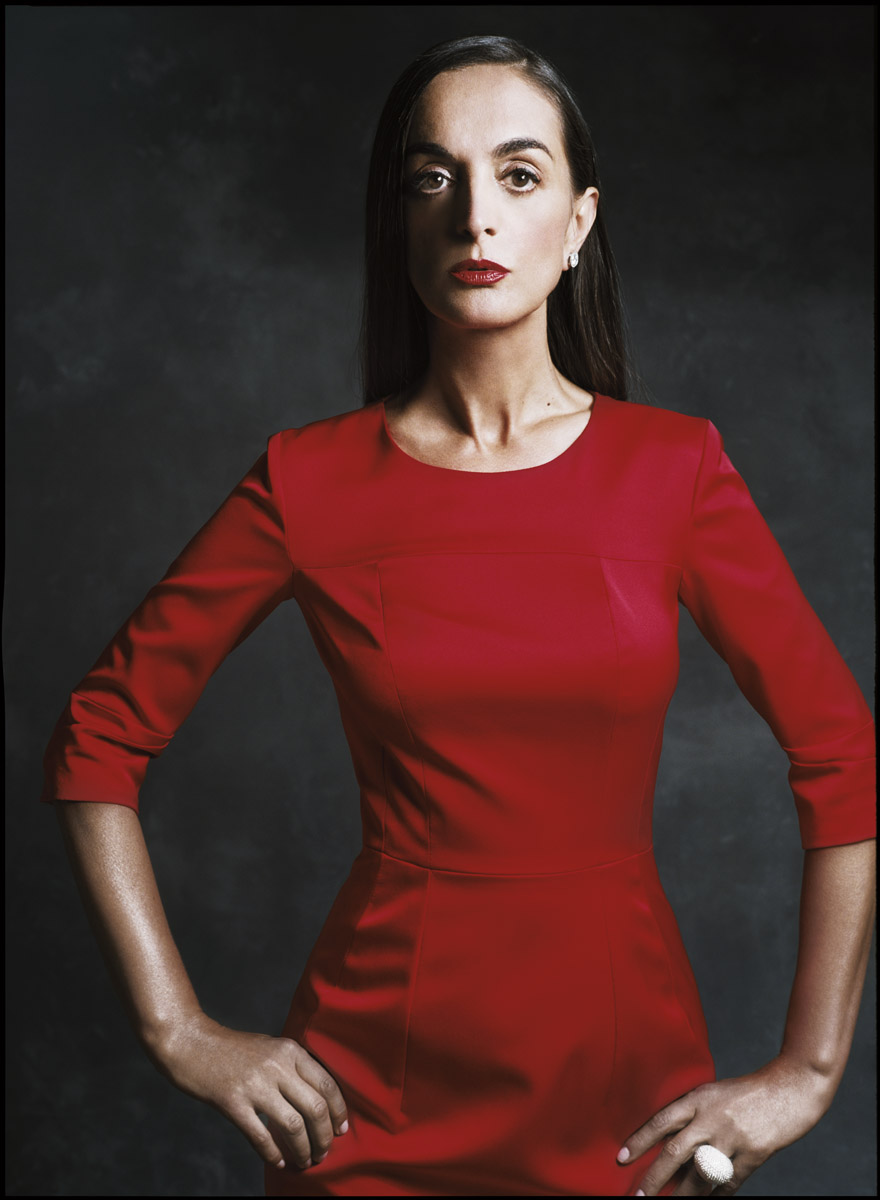
- Born: Serbia
- Education: University of Belgrade Faculty of Economics
- Occupations: artist; fashion editor; stylist; film director
- Years active: 1996–present
- Known for: Personal stylist for Michael Jackson
- Title: Contributing Fashion Editor for L'Uomo Vogue and Vogue Italia
- Website: www.rushkabergman.com

Rushka Bergman is a Serbian American artist, fashion editor; and film director. She is best known for being the personal stylist of American singer Michael Jackson and acted as creative consultant and costume designer for his This Is It concerts in London. She was a Contributing Fashion Editor at Vogue Italia and L'Uomo Vogue for decades, and she was a creative consultant to rapper Nicki Minaj.

== Background ==
Bergman was born in Serbia, and received her degree from the University of Belgrade Faculty of Economics. Shortly thereafter she moved to Ghana and continued her education in fine art. She is now based in New York City.

== Career ==
After moving to New York in 1996, Bergman began working as a stylist immediately. In 2000, she participated in the creation of the Giorgio Armani exhibit in collaboration with The Guggenheim Museum and Royal Academy of Arts in London. She also worked with photographer Tom Munro on the accompanying book, Giorgio Armani, for which she helped to create the cover as well as many of the images inside. In 2004, Bergman collaborated with Bryan Adams on Calvin Klein's book American Women, where she styled some of the United States most unforgettable women, including former Secretary of State Hillary Clinton. Bergman often collaborates with filmmaker/photographer Francesco Carrozzini. She was the costume designer for his short film 1937 which was selected at the 2008 Venice Film Festival. Bergman has worked for many years as a contributing fashion editor at Vogue Italia and L'Uomo Vogue and has styled over 80 covers to date. In 2026, she styled Charlotte Casiraghi, writer, philosopher and modern muse, as well as a member of the Monaco princely family for a Vanity Fair France cover and feature photographed by Matthew Brookes.

== L'Uomo Vogue & Vogue Italia ==
Her notable subjects include musicians such as Michael Jackson, Madonna, Jay-Z, Beyoncé, Nicki Minaj, Zayn Malik, Sting, David Byrne, Björk, Kanye West, Frank Ocean, Usher, Sean Combs, A$AP Rocky, and Snoop Dogg; directors Steven Spielberg, Tim Burton, David Cronenberg, David Lynch, Quentin Tarantino, Ang Lee, Oliver Stone, Bennett Miller, Stephen Frears, Wong Kar-Wai, Darren Aronofsky, and David Fincher; actors Robert De Niro, Morgan Freeman, Christoph Waltz, Mickey Rourke, Tim Roth, Samuel L. Jackson, Robert Downey Jr., Robert Pattinson, Michael Fassbender, Jake Gyllenhaal, Shia LaBeouf, Gerard Butler, Hugh Jackman, Keira Knightley, Alec Baldwin, Stephen Dorff, Taylor Lautner, Mark Ruffalo, Ben Stiller, Daniel Radcliffe, Tobey Maguire, Dane DeHaan, Sarah Gadon, Kim Kardashian, Parker Posey and Shailene Woodley; notable athletes Kobe Bryant, Serena Williams and Neymar da Silva; entrepreneurs Mark Parker, Richard Branson, Charles Annenberg, David Rockefeller, Evan Spiegel, and Jimmy Wales; and artists including Jeff Koons, Marina Abramović, Frank Gehry, Peter Marino, Rem Koolhaas, Andres Serrano, Shepard Fairey, Michael Cunningham, Ole Scheeren, Sir Jonathan Ive, Shirin Neshat, and Ed Ruscha.

Bergman has worked on beauty campaigns for Shiseido and L'Oreal as well as advertising campaigns for Valentino, Pringle of Scotland, Bally, Heaven Marc Jacobs, Mango, amongst others. In 2011, she appeared on America's Next Top Model as a guest stylist for a Michael Jackson-themed photo shoot. In 2014, she was awarded the Nikola Tesla Visual Arts Achievement Award by the Tesla Science Foundation. Bergman received Elle Serbia's International Style Icon award, in November 2015.

=== Michael Jackson ===
After meeting Michael Jackson on the set of his 2007 L'Uomo Vogue cover shoot with Bruce Weber, Bergman began to work as Jackson's creative consultant and stylist, and the two became close friends. In addition to being his personal stylist, Bergman collaborated on his costumes for the This Is It concerts with haute couture designers Christophe Decarnin for Balmain, Kris Van Assche for Christian Dior, John Galliano, Riccardo Tisci for Givenchy, and Giuseppe Zanotti.

=== Nicki Minaj ===
Bergman began styling rapper Nicki Minaj on 24 August 2014 for the 2014 MTV Video Music Awards. Since then, they've continued to collaborate on fashion editorials for Vogue Italia, L'Uomo Vogue, Rolling Stone, Billboard and The New York Times, and the Roberto Cavalli Spring/Summer 2015 campaign. Bergman was the creative director of costume design for Nicki Minaj's 2015 European and American The Pinkprint Tour. Bergman has continued to style Minaj for ongoing TV appearances on The Tonight Show, The View, Saturday Night Live, Good Morning America; and award shows such as: The 2014 MTV Europe Music Awards, The 2015 American Music Awards, The 2015 Grammy Awards, and The 2015 MTV Video Music Awards.

After a couple of years of not styling Minaj, Bergman returned styling Minaj in 2021, styling her in her music video for her collaboration with American rapper Lil Baby titled "Do We Have a Problem?".

=== Curator ===
In 2025 Bergman was the Exhibition Curator and Creative Director of Lightning Shadows at Georges Bergès Gallery in support of Heal Los Angeles Foundation, of which she is an ambassador.

== Filmography ==
=== Film ===
Year	Title	Role	Notes
2008	1937	Costume designer	Short film
2009	Michael Jackson's This Is It	Herself	Documentary
2012	Marina Abramović: The Artist Is Present	Featured talent	Documentary
2012	The Gun, the Cake and the Butterfly	Herself	Documentary
2014	Michael Jackson: The Last Photo Shoots	Herself	Documentary
2014	The Pinkprint	Wardrobe & Costume Designer for Nicki Minaj	Short film
2018	The Last Judgment	Herself	Short film featured at The Tribeca Film Center

=== Television ===
Year	Title	Role	Notes
2010-2011	America's Next Top Model	Herself / Fashion Editor & Stylist	8 episodes
2015	My Time Again	Herself	Television film documentary
2020	Unfiltered: Paris Jackson & Gabriel Glenn	Herself	4 episodes

=== Music videos ===
Year	Song	Artist	Notes
2014	"Only"	Nicki Minaj	Directed by Hannah Lux Davis

== Awards ==
- In 2014, Bergman was awarded the Nikola Tesla Visual Arts Achievement Award by the Tesla Science Foundation.
- In 2015, Bergman received Elle Serbia's International Style Icon award.
- In 2017, The Nicki Minaj Cover of The New York Times Magazine won the top prize at the Society of Publication Designers (SPD) Awards
