= Ivan Mrkić =

Serbian diplomat and politician

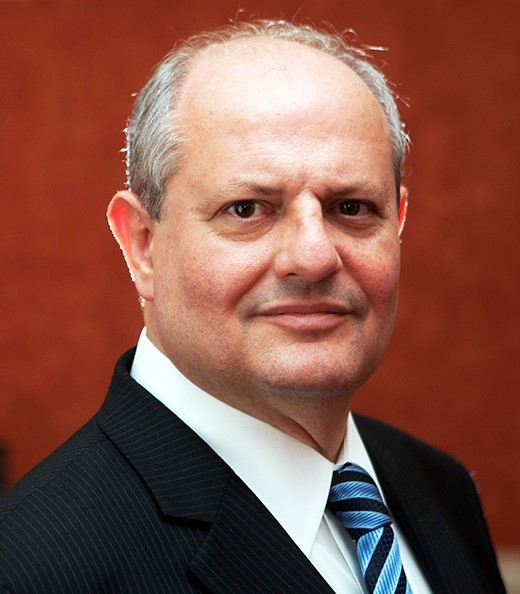

Minister of Foreign Affairs of Serbia
- In office 27 July 2012 – 27 April 2014
- President: Tomislav Nikolić
- Prime Minister: Ivica Dačić
- Preceded by: Vuk Jeremić
- Succeeded by: Ivica Dačić

Ambassador to Japan
- In office 2006–2011
- Preceded by: Predrag Filipov
- Succeeded by: Bojana Adamović Dragović

Personal details
- Born: 30 May 1953 (age 73) Belgrade, Yugoslavia
- Spouse: Ivona Mrkić
- Children: 2
- Education: University of Belgrade Faculty of Law
- Website: Official biography

Ivan Mrkić (Serbian Cyrillic: Иван Мркић, pronounced [ǐʋan mr̂kitɕ], born 30 May 1953) is a Serbian diplomat and the former Minister of Foreign Affairs.

== Early life and education ==
Mrkić was born in Belgrade, Serbia, Yugoslavia, where he finished his elementary and secondary education. He graduated from the University of Belgrade Faculty of Law in 1977. He also speaks English and French.

== Professional career ==
Mrkić started his diplomatic career soon after graduation, with a job at the Federal Ministry for Foreign Affairs of Yugoslavia.

Between 1979 and 1982, Mrkić worked as a clerk in the Administration of International Relations of the Federal Ministry for Foreign Affairs. He attended a United Nations Disarmament Fellowship in Geneva, Vienna, New York, and Boston. He continued on in the roles of counselor, then Assistant Chief of the Division of Multilateral Activities. He was also a participant in United Nations General Assembly sessions, as well as in the delegation at the Ninth Conference of the Non Aligned Movement in Belgrade in 2012.

Mrkić continued his diplomatic service in Brussels, where he served as the Minister Counselor for the Yugoslav mission to the European Community between 1990 and 1992. During that period, he participated in the work of the Conference on the former Yugoslavia in The Hague and Brussels.

From 1992–93, Mrkić served as Chief of the Cabinet under Dobrica Ćosić, the first President of the Federal Republic of Yugoslavia.

In 1993, Mrkić was appointed to the office of the Yugoslav Embassy's chargé d'affaires in Cyprus, after which he became the Yugoslav Ambassador in Nicosia, Cyprus, where he remained until 1999. He shifted into an ambassadorial role as the Ministry of Foreign Affairs in Belgrade, and became Deputy Head for Bilateral Affairs in 2000. In 2001, he accepted an appointment as Head of Bilateral Relations and Assistant to the Federal Minister of Foreign Affairs. Starting in 2004, Mrkić joined a group of ambassadors for special and ad hoc duties in the Ministry of Foreign Affairs of the then Serbia and Montenegro.

In 2005, he served as President of the National Commission for the Implementation of the Chemical Weapons Convention, appointed by the Council of Ministers of Serbia and Montenegro. In 2006, Ivan Mrkić was appointed as Ambassador of the Republic of Serbia to Tokyo, Japan, where he served his diplomatic tenure until 2011. He co-authored the book A little Guide Through The History of Serbo-Japanese Relations (2011).

After completing his service in Japan in 2011, Mrkić was appointed State Secretary in the Ministry of Foreign Affairs of Serbia under his predecessor Vuk Jeremić, where he stayed until his appointment as Minister of Foreign Affairs.

== Minister of Foreign Affairs ==
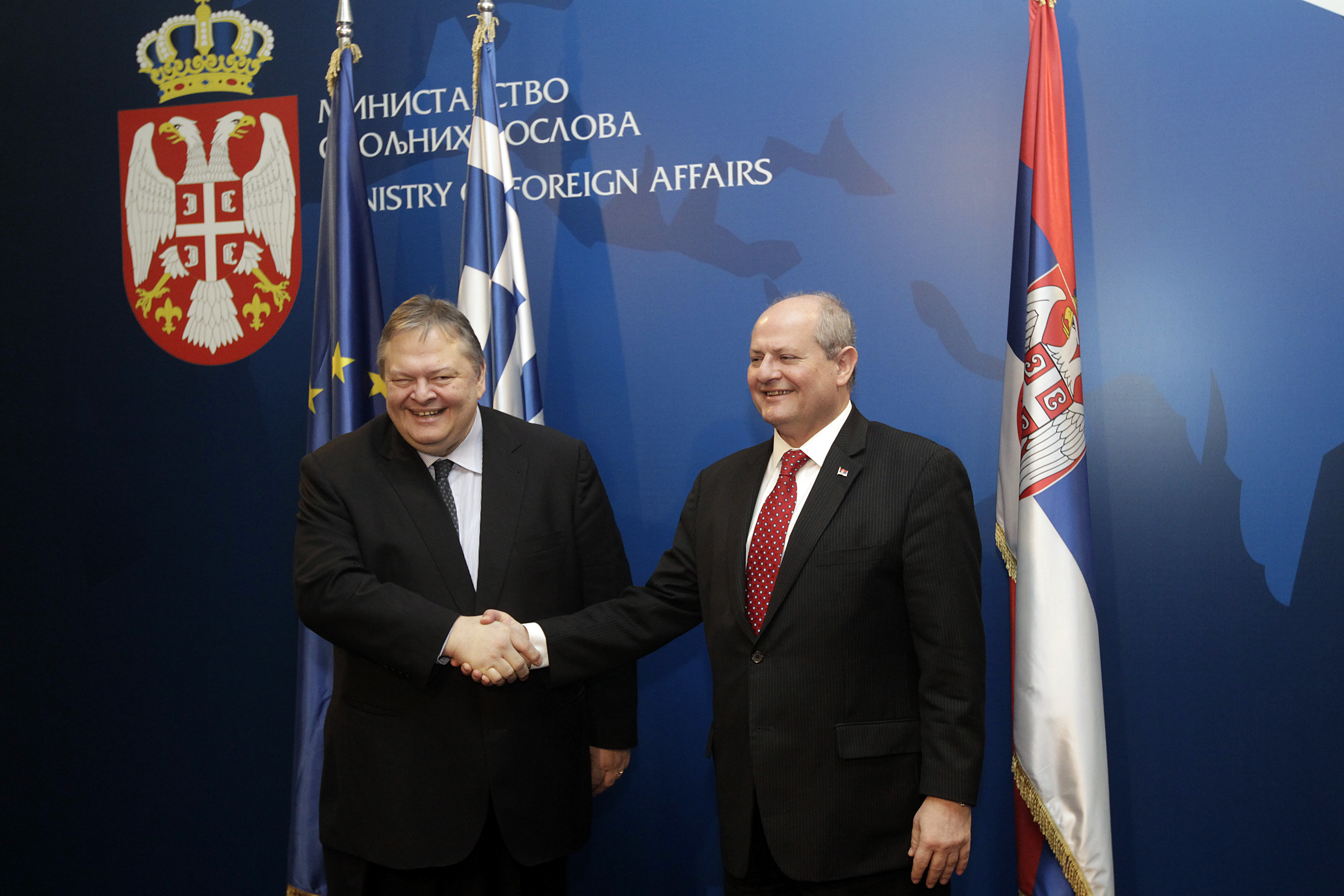
Greek Foreign Minister Evangelos Venizelos (left) and Ivan Mrkić in February 2014

On 27 July 2012, Mrkić was appointed as the Serbian Minister of Foreign Affairs in the cabinet of Prime Minister Ivica Dačić. He was appointed as a career diplomat and independent candidate, not aligned with any party, but was endorsed by Serbian Progressive Party.

Immediately after his appointment, Mrkić acknowledged that there would be no changes in Serbia's foreign policy. He explained that a foundation for foreign policy would remain, preserving territorial integrity and sovereignty, and that the priority would be fully-fledged European Union membership.

"We know what our foundations and priorities are and we point out our pathway toward the EU membership and that is not any different than it was in the previous period." Mrkić gave this quote during an interview with Serbian Broadcaster B92. When asked about the future relations with Moscow and Washington, he said, "Serbia has exceptionally good relations with Russia while it wanted to deepen and improve the existing solid partnership with the U.S." When it came to regional cooperation and good neighborly relations, Mrkić stated, "I expect that there will be intensive communication with colleagues from the neighboring countries in the future period and that we will be seeing each other at numerous meetings."

He has been nominated by the government of Serbia on two occasions (2017 and 2020) as a member of the National Council for the Coordination of the Cooperation with the Russian Federation and the People’s Republic of China.

He is presently the member of the Supervisory Board of the Jugoslovensko rečno brodarstvo AD (Yugoslav River Freight Transportation).

Mr. Mrkić has been re-elected to the post of the President of the Commission of International Sport Cooperation of the Olympic Committee of Serbia in 2021.

Since 2020, Mr. Mrkić assumed the duty of the member of the Editorial Board of the Magazine Napredak (Progress), as Editor-in-Chief of International Affairs.

He has been appointed by the WanLi Think Tank, Beijing, China, as the Director of International Relations.

Actively lectures at domestic and foreign universities and institutions.

== Personal life ==
Ivan Mrkić and his wife Ivona have two children.

== Honors ==
- Grand Cordon of the Order of the Rising Sun: 2018

Government offices
Preceded by Vuk Jeremić	Minister of Foreign Affairs of Serbia; 2012-2014	Succeeded by Ivica Dačić
