= Mirko Cvetković =

Prime Minister of Serbia (2008–2012)

- Мирко Цветковић
- Cvetković in 2010

Prime Minister of Serbia
- In office 7 July 2008 – 27 July 2012
- President: Boris Tadić; Slavica Đukić Dejanović (Acting); Tomislav Nikolić
- Deputy: Ivica Dačić
- Preceded by: Vojislav Koštunica
- Succeeded by: Ivica Dačić

Minister of Finance
- In office 14 March 2011 – 27 July 2012
- Prime Minister: Himself
- Preceded by: Diana Dragutinović
- Succeeded by: Mlađan Dinkić
- In office 15 May 2007 – 7 July 2008
- Prime Minister: Vojislav Koštunica
- Preceded by: Mlađan Dinkić
- Succeeded by: Diana Dragutinović

Director of the Privatisation Agency
- In office 19 June 2003 – 1 August 2004
- Preceded by: Vladimir Čupić
- Succeeded by: Branko Pavlović

Personal details
- Born: 16 August 1950 (age 76) Zaječar, PR Serbia, FPR Yugoslavia
- Party: Independent
- Spouse: Zorica Cvetković
- Education: University of Belgrade
- Profession: Economist

Mirko Cvetković (Note: Serbian Cyrillic: Мирко Цветковић, pronounced [mǐːrkɔ tsʋɛ̂tkɔʋitɕ]) (born 16 August 1950) is a Serbian economist and former politician who served as the prime minister of Serbia from 2008 to 2012 and as finance minister from 2007 to 2008, and again from 2011 to 2012.

Cvetković became the prime minister as an nonpartisan politician endorsed by For a European Serbia coalition, which declared Serbia's accession to the European Union (EU) as its main goal. During his government run, the EU has abolished visas for Serbian citizens traveling to the Schengen Area countries, Serbia received an EU candidate status, as well as, completed obligations to the International Criminal Tribunal for the former Yugoslavia (ICTY). The period of his premiership was marked by the challenges of the Kosovo declaration of independence and the Great Recession, leading to low rates of economic growth.

== Biography ==
Mirko Cvetković was born in the small city of Zaječar in eastern Serbia on 16 August 1950. His father Srboljub was an economist while his mother Stana worked as a pharmacist. His grandfather, Mirko, a school teacher, was killed in 1941, by German soldiers during the Kragujevac massacre.

He completed his elementary and high school education in Zaječar. Mirko Cvetković graduated from the University of Belgrade Faculty of Economics where he also received his MComm and PhD.

Cvetković worked at the Mining Institute for ten years and later at the Economics Institute for another six years, followed by seven years at the advisory and research firm CES Mecon where he worked as a consultant.

In the 1980s he was external consultant for the World Bank on a number of projects in Pakistan, India and Turkey and worked on the United Nations Development Programme (UNDP) in Somalia. As of 2013, Cvetkovic has reestablished himself as a consultant for the World Bank.

In the period 1998–2001 he was employed as adviser for economic issues at the Mining Institute, and in 2005 he became the Special Advisor at CEO Intercom Consulting.

He has published a number of papers and articles on privatization in Serbia and abroad.

Cvetković is married and has two children. Apart from his native tongue, he speaks English and French fluently and, as a hobby, plays piano, saxophone and clarinet.

== Political career ==
=== Early years ===
After the overthrow of Slobodan Milošević, from January 2001 Cvetković worked as Deputy Minister of Economy and Privatisation in the Government of Serbia of Zoran Djindjić. From 2003 to 2004 he was the Director of the Privatisation Agency. After the fall of Zoran Živković's government on 2003 elections, Cvetković withdrew from politics.

Cvetković served as the Minister of Finance from 15 May 2007 to July 2008 in the coalition government of Vojislav Koštunica.

He was best remembered as being the first to doubt the way money from the central budget was spent in Kosovo. Back then, he told his colleagues in the government: "You can raise the salaries of employees in Kosovo if you give up a part of your salary".

=== Prime minister ===
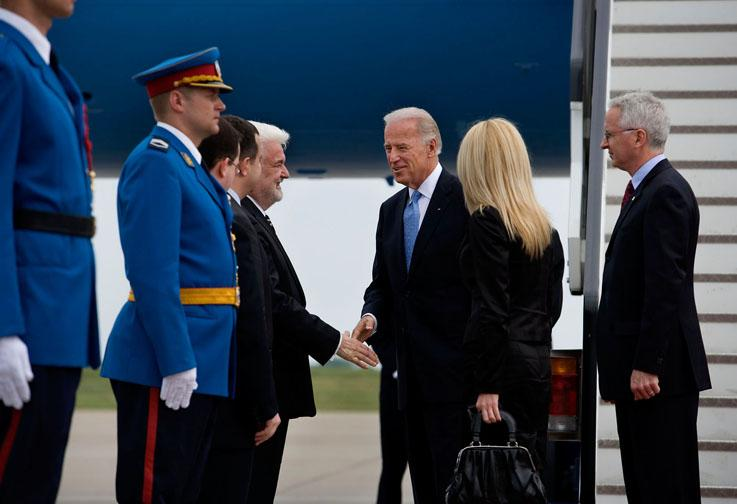
Cvetković with U.S. Vice President Joe Biden

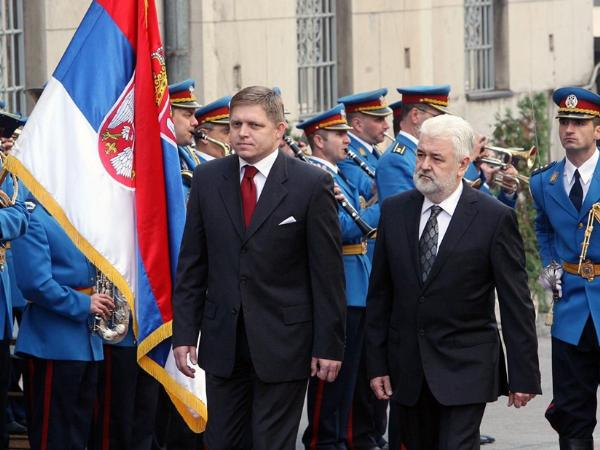
Cvetković with Slovak Prime Minister Robert Fico

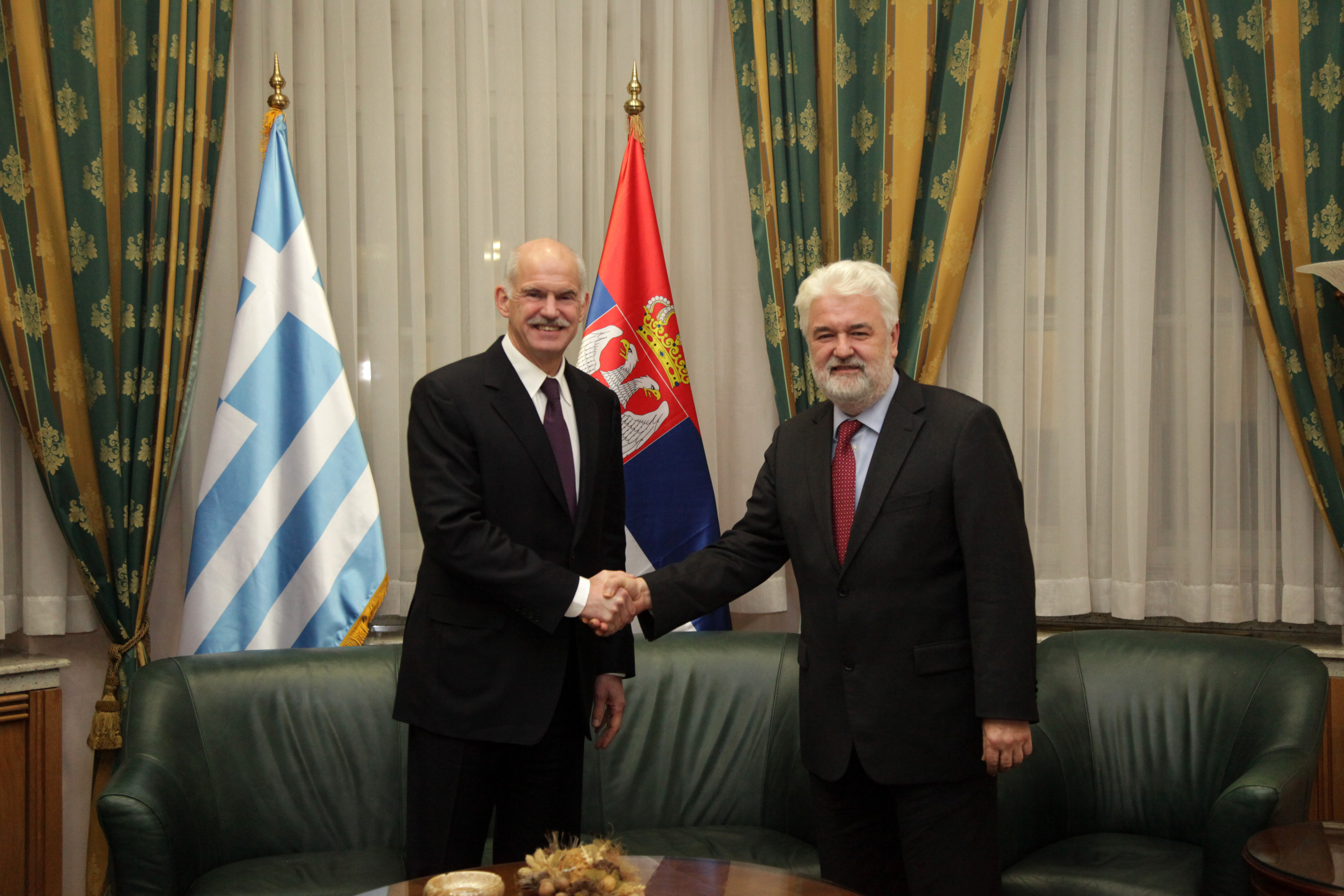
Cvetković with Greek prime minister George Papandreou

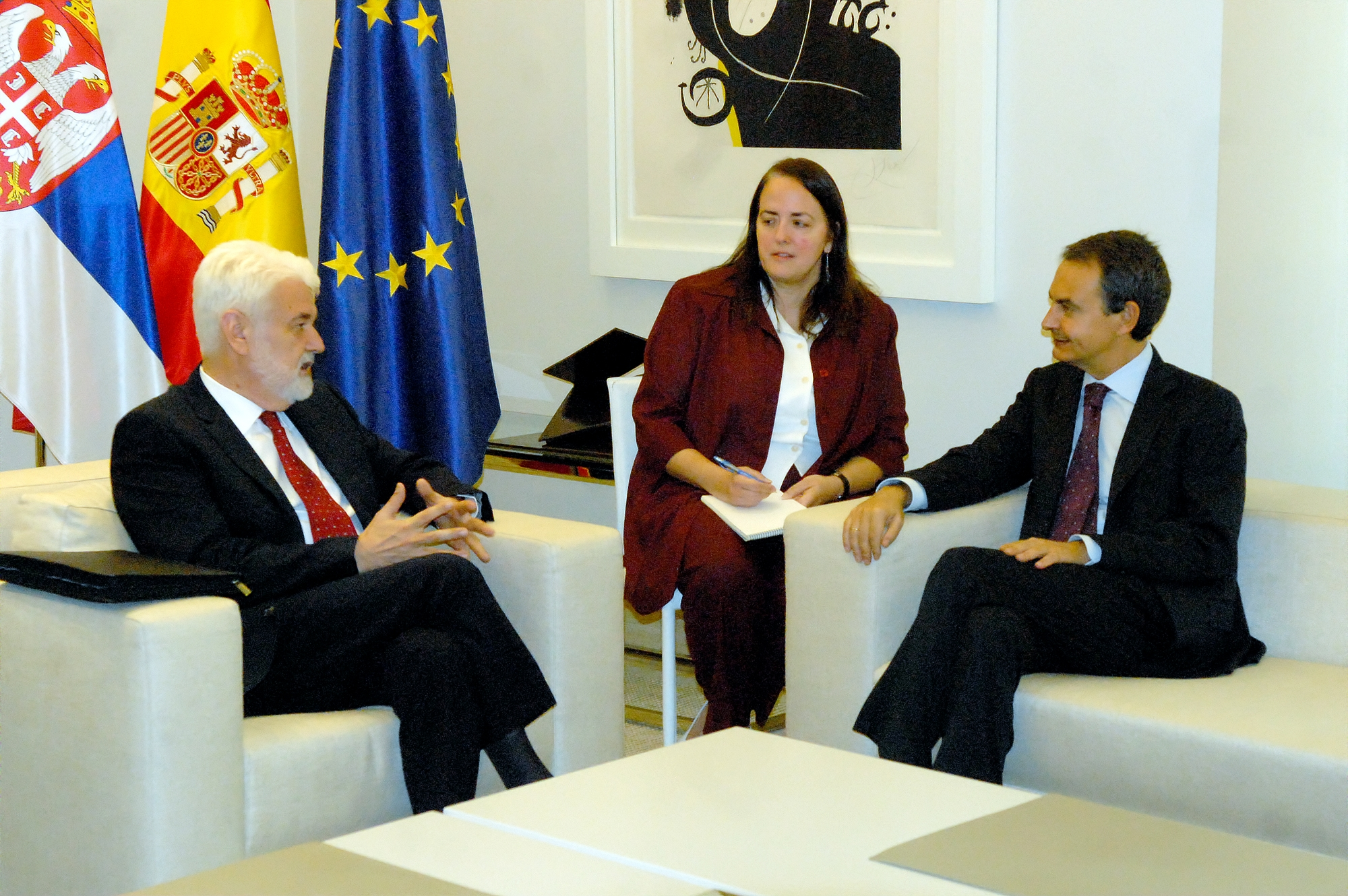
Cvetković with Spanish Prime Minister José Luis Rodríguez Zapatero.

On 27 June 2008, President Boris Tadić named Cvetković as the new prime minister following the parliamentary elections that were held in May. Other possible candidates were the current foreign minister Vuk Jeremić and the current President of the Executive Council of Vojvodina Bojan Pajtić.

Cvetković is the first prime minister of Serbia since the introduction of the multiparty system who had not previously been in a high position in one of the ruling parties.

He was sworn in on 7 July after taking the oath of office in the National Assembly. In his exposé keynote address Cvetković said that one of the first moves of the new Government will be to submit the Stabilization and Association Agreement with the European Union to the parliament for ratification and that it will not accept Kosovo's unilaterally declared independence.

He also stated that the government will strengthen the economy and social responsibility and lead a decisive battle against crime and corruption, and in favor of international justice. He also said that one of the first lawmaking initiatives will be the ratification of the energy arrangement with the Russian Federation.

Cvetković is seen by many as an expert in the economy, a man of compromise, respected by the Democratic Party but by other political parties as well. Western news agencies describe him as a "Democrat" (indicating support for the pro-Western Democratic Party) and a "low profile technocrat" likely to prefer improving Serbia's economy rather than concentrating on difficult political issues.

His political policies combined authority and moderate economic liberalism – that is, the support of laissez-faire economic policies.

== See also ==
- List of prime ministers of Serbia
- Government of Serbia

Political offices
Preceded by Mlađan Dinkić	Minister of Finance; 2007–2008	Succeeded by Diana Dragutinović
Preceded by Vojislav Koštunica	Prime Minister of Serbia; 2008–2012	Succeeded by Ivica Dačić
Preceded by Diana Dragutinović	Minister of Finance; 2011–2012	Succeeded by Mlađan Dinkić
