= Dejan Šoškić =

Serbian economist and central banker (born 1967)

- Дејан Шошкић
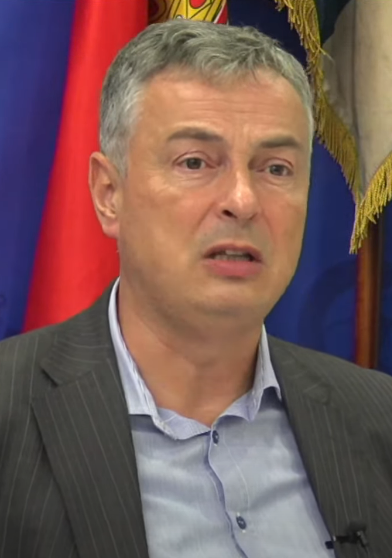
- Šoškić in November 2021

Member of the National Assembly
- Incumbent
- Assumed office 17 November 2026

Governor of the National Bank of Serbia
- In office 28 July 2010 – 6 August 2012
- Deputy: Bojan Marković; Ana Gligorijević; Mira Erić-Jović; Diana Dragutinović
- Preceded by: Radovan Jelašić
- Succeeded by: Jorgovanka Tabaković

Personal details
- Born: 15 March 1967 (age 59) Belgrade, Yugoslavia
- Party: Independent
- Other political affiliations: Student List (2026–present)
- Education: University of Belgrade (BEc, MA, PhD)
- Profession: Economist; university professor; politician
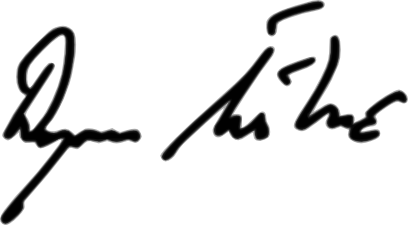
- Signature

Dejan Šoškić (Serbian: Дејан Шошкић, [dêjaːn ʃôʃkitɕ]; born 15 March 1967) is a Serbian economist and politician who has been a member of the National Assembly since 17 November 2026. He served as Governor of the National Bank of Serbia (NBS) from 2010 to 2012, and resigned in protest at legal changes that he said undermined the central bank's independence. He is a full professor at the University of Belgrade Faculty of Economics, and was elected on the Student List in the 2026 Serbian parliamentary election.

== Education and academic career ==
Šoškić was born in Belgrade. He graduated from the University of Belgrade Faculty of Economics in 1989, when he was named the university's best student of his year, and earned a master's degree there in 1993. He completed his doctorate in 1999 with a thesis on portfolio management and investment funds, based on an economic and statistical analysis of US examples.

He has taught financial markets and institutions, financial management, and international business and economics on graduate and MBA courses at the University of Nebraska Omaha, and in 2002 was a guest lecturer at the universities of New Haven, Rhode Island and California, Berkeley. He attended specialised financial-market courses at US universities (in 1994, 1998 and 2002) and at the Swiss National Bank (in 2001). He is a Fulbright alumnus and a member of the presidency of the Scientific Society of Economists of Serbia.

He is the author of Securities: Portfolio Management and Investment Funds and co-author of Financial Markets and Institutions, Economic Statistics and Stock Exchange Glossary, and has published more than 40 articles on financial markets and institutions and on Serbia's economic transition.

== Central banking ==
Šoškić was a special adviser on financial markets at the National Bank of Yugoslavia in Serbia and Montenegro from 2000 to 2002, and an economic policy adviser at the EU Policy and Legal Advice Centre from 2002 to 2003. He later sat on the Council of the National Bank of Serbia, serving as its chairman until his appointment as governor.

On 28 July 2010, the National Assembly elected him Governor of the National Bank of Serbia for a six-year term. He resigned on 2 August 2012, after the new government proposed amendments to the Law on the National Bank of Serbia. He argued that the changes would substantially impair the bank's independence and the professionalism of its decision-making, and could fuel economic and financial instability. The Assembly accepted his resignation on 6 August 2012 and elected Jorgovanka Tabaković as his successor.

== Political career ==
After leaving the central bank, Šoškić became a frequent commentator on economic policy. In November 2021, he said that all available data showed corruption to be "a very serious problem" in Serbia, "much more prevalent than in neighbouring countries", and that it deterred both foreign and domestic investment. When he was mentioned as a possible opposition presidential candidate, he said he had no political ambitions, and that if he had, he would already have joined a party.

In November 2025, Vreme reported that he was among the prospective candidates who had accepted an invitation to join the Student List, the electoral list formed by the students leading the anti-corruption protests. When the list was submitted to the Republic Electoral Commission on 14 September 2026, ahead of the snap parliamentary election, he was placed 27th, marking his first entry into electoral politics. During the campaign, the pro-government tabloid Kurir attacked his record as governor, calling him the "executioner of the Serbian economy".

The Student List won 140 of the 250 seats. Šoškić entered the National Assembly when the mandates of all 250 members were confirmed at the constitutive session of the 15th convocation on 17 November 2026.

Government offices
Preceded by Radovan Jelašić	Governor of the National Bank of Serbia; 2010–2012	Succeeded by Jorgovanka Tabaković
