= Mirjana Orašanin =

Sarajevian politician

Member of the National Assembly of Republika Srpska
- Incumbent
- Assumed office November 2022

Personal details
- Born: 16 December 1973 (age 52) Sarajevo, SR Bosnia and Herzegovina, SFR Yugoslavia
- Party: Serbian Democratic Party (SDS)
- Education: PhD in Economics, Singidunum University
- Alma mater: University of Siena
- Occupation: Politician

Mirjana Orašanin (born 16 December 1973 in Sarajevo) is a member of the National Assembly of Republika Srpska. She represents the Serbian Democratic Party (SDS) and serves as Vice President of the SDS parliamentary caucus. She resides in Bijeljina.

== Early life ==
Mirjana Orašanin was born in Sarajevo in 1973, where she completed her primary and secondary education at an economic school. She studied at the University of Siena, Italy, and earned a degree in Italian language teaching. She obtained a PhD in Economics from Singidunum University in Belgrade.

== Career ==
Mirjana Orašanin began her political involvement at the local level as a member of the Serbian Democratic Party (SDS) in Bijeljina. She has served as a city assembly councilor and has been active within the SDS club of councilors in the Bijeljina City Assembly, including a period when she temporarily left and later rejoined the club.

In November 2022, Orašanin entered national politics when she secured a seat in the National Assembly of the Republic of Srpska, replacing another SDS representative and representing her party in the legislative body.
