= University of Belgrade Faculty of Economics =

University faculty in Belgrade, Serbia

- Економски факултет Универзитета у Београду
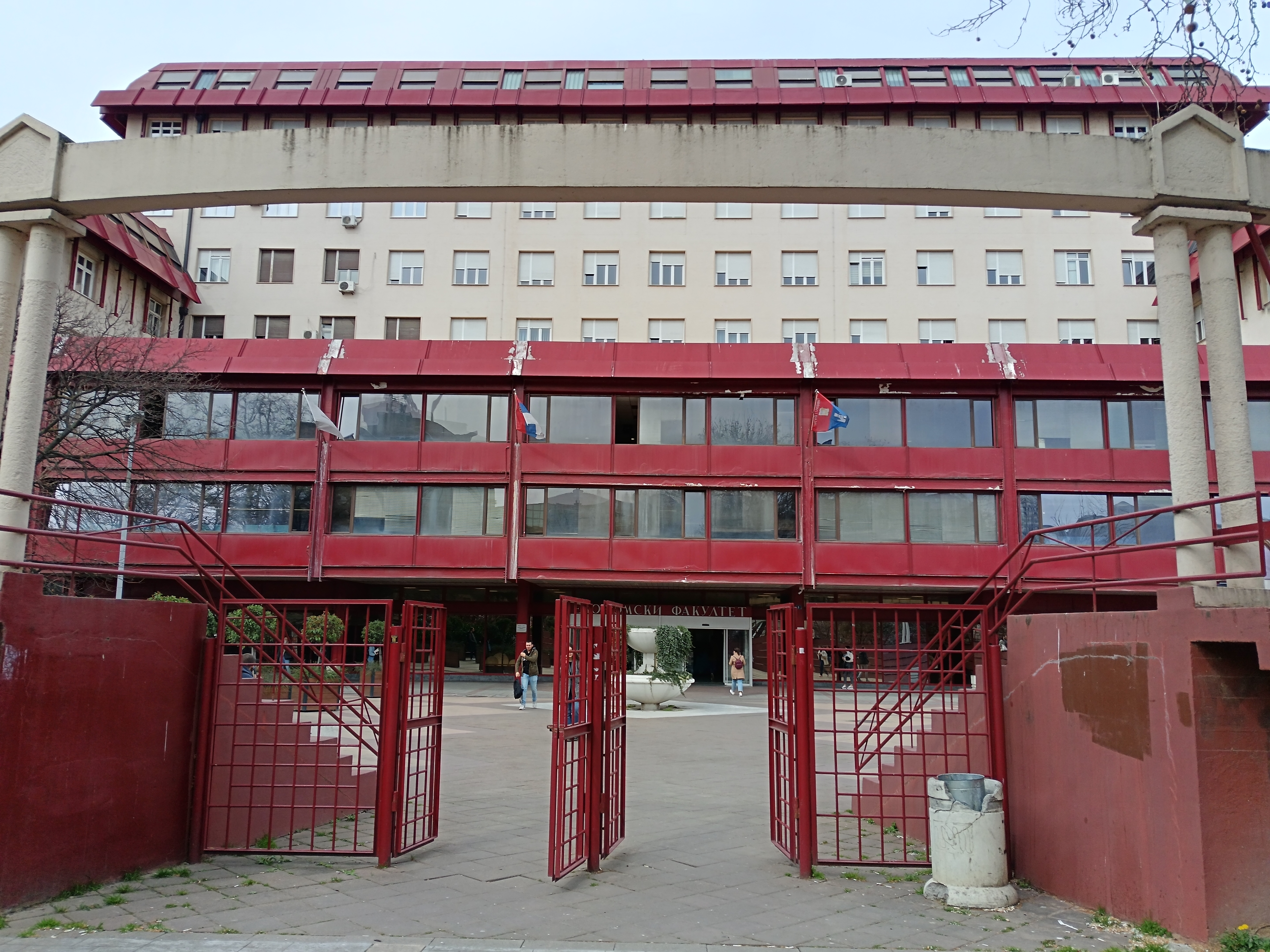
- Former names: Economics-Commercial High School (1937–47)
- Type: Public
- Established: 31 March 1937; 89 years ago
- Affiliations: University of Belgrade
- Dean: PhD Žaklina Stojanović
- Academic staff: 178 (2018–19)
- Administrative staff: 69 (2016–17)
- Students: 8,033 (2018–19)
- Undergraduates: 6,650 (2018–19)
- Postgraduates: 1,311 (2018–19)
- Doctoral students: 72 (2018–19)
- Location: Belgrade, Serbia; 44.811740°N 20.455058°E
- Campus: Urban
- Website: www.ekof.bg.ac.rs

The University of Belgrade Faculty of Economics (Serbian: Економски факултет Универзитета у Београду/Ekonomski fakultet Univerziteta u Beogradu) is one of the educational institutions of the University of Belgrade, Serbia. The building is located in the city center of Belgrade, in the Savski Venac municipality. The Belgrade's School of Economics is Serbia's leading educational institution in business and economics.

== History ==
Initially established on 31 March 1937 as Economics-Commercial High School, the Faculty of Economics was the first center of higher education dedicated to the study of economics in the Kingdom of Yugoslavia. On 7 February 1947, The Faculty of Economics was included in the composition of the University of Belgrade.

Its curriculum includes courses in economic analysis and policy; marketing; accounting, auditing and financial management; trade and commerce; finance, banking and insurance; tourism and hotel industry; statistics and informatics; management and international economics and foreign trade.

In its 80-year old history, around 50,000 students have graduated from the Faculty. As of 2016, the Faculty has a total of 9,206 enrolled students.

Starting with the 2017–18 winter semester, the faculty offers an international bachelor studies for 30 students in cooperation with the London School of Economics and University of London. After successful completion, students gain parallel degrees from these institutions.

== Organization and resources ==
The Faculty has a total of six departments:

- Department for Economic Theory and Analysis
- Department for Economic Policy and Development
- Department for International Economic Relations
- Department for Business Economics and Management
- Department for Accounting and Business Finance
- Department for Statistics and Mathematics

The Faculty includes a library with over 120,000 titles. The Faculty's Publication Center has grown into one of the leading Serbian publishers for economic literature. Its research center has implemented over 800 projects in the field of restructuring, assets valuation, privatization, investment, etc., as well as over one hundred macroeconomic projects for governments and multilateral institutions.

== Notable alumni and teaching staff ==
Some of the school's renowned students and professors include: Rushka Bergman, Sonja Biserko, Mirko Cvetković, Bojan Dimitrijević, Mlađan Dinkić, Diana Dragutinović, Mitja Gaspari, Radovan Jelašić, Srgjan Kerim, Nikola Kljusev, Dragan Maršićanin, Gordana Matković, Branko Milanovic, Slobodan Milosavljević, Miroslav Mišković, Abdul Rahman Munif, Milorad Nedeljković, Ivo Perišin, Aleksandar Pravdić, Toplica Spasojević, Srđan Srećković, Kori Udovički, Ashagre Yigletu, Zaim Topčić and Philip Zepter.
