= Jorgovanka Tabaković =

Serbian politician

- Јоргованка Табаковић
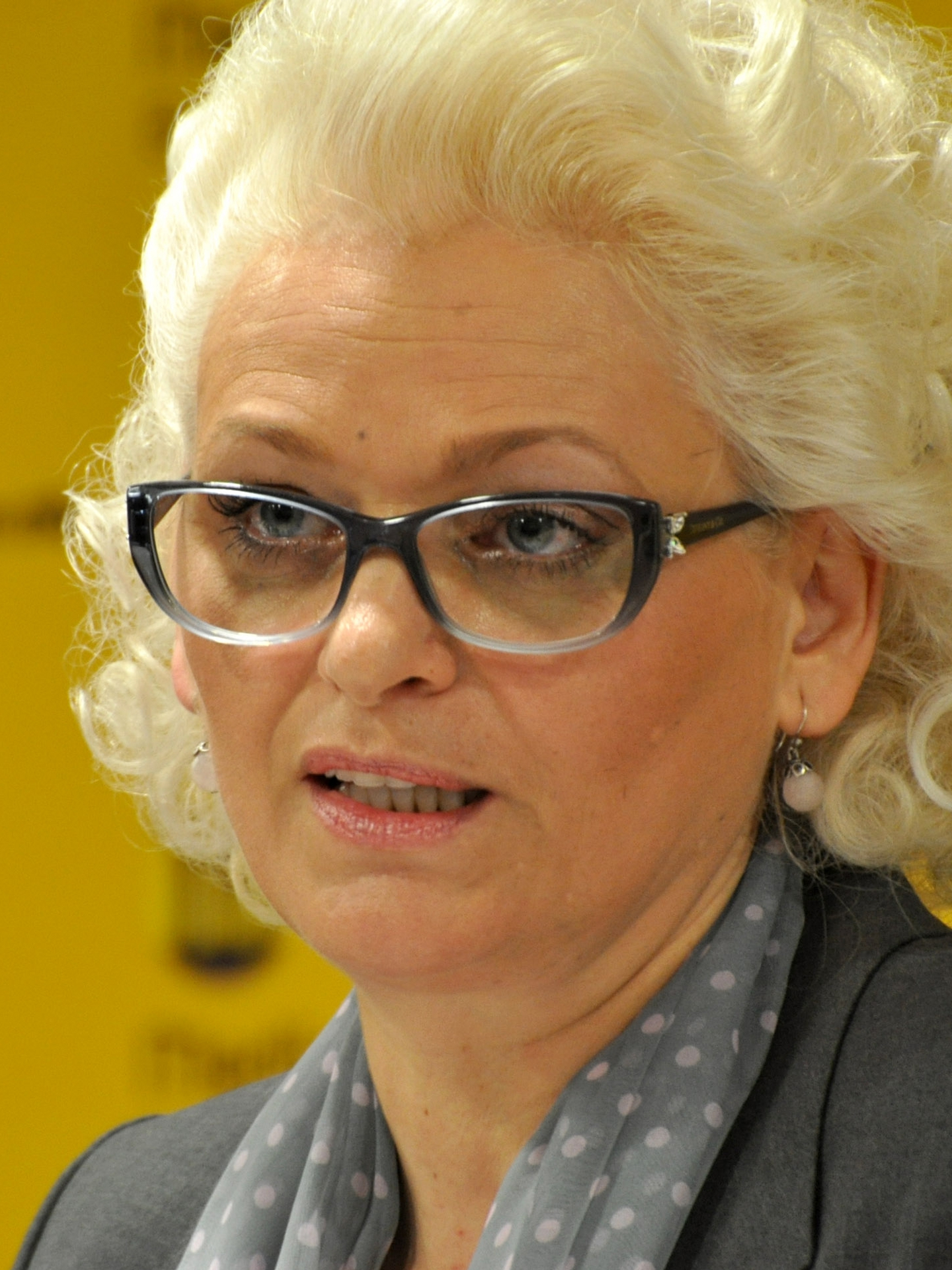
- Tabaković in 2012

Governor of the National Bank of Serbia
- Incumbent
- Assumed office 6 August 2012
- Preceded by: Dejan Šoškić

Minister of Ownership and Economic Transformation
- In office 24 March 1998 – 24 October 2000
- Preceded by: Milan Beko
- Succeeded by: Oskar Kovač

Personal details
- Born: 21 March 1960 (age 66) Vučitrn, PR Serbia, FPR Yugoslavia
- Party: SRS (1992–2008); SNS (2008–present)
- Children: 3
- Education: University of Priština
- Profession: Economist
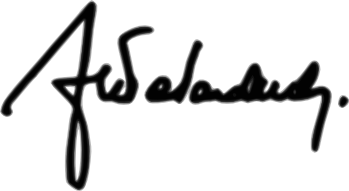
- Signature

Jorgovanka Tabaković (Serbian Cyrillic: Јоргованка Табаковић; pronounced [jorɡǒʋaːŋka tǎbakoʋitɕ]; born 21 March 1960) is a Serbian politician who has been the Governor of the National Bank of Serbia since 2012. A member of the Serbian Progressive Party (SNS), she has been the deputy president of the party since 2012.

== Early life and education ==
Tabaković holds a bachelor's and master's degree in economics from the University of Priština and a Ph.D. in economics obtained in 2011 from the private Faculty of Service Business.

== Career ==
In 1992, Tabaković joined the Serbian Radical Party and represented the party in the Parliament as a member. After the 1997 elections, the radicals joined a new Serbian government in 1998, with the Socialist Party of Serbia and JUL. That same year, she became Minister of Ownership and Economic Transformation.

In May 2008, in early parliamentary elections, Tabaković was re-elected as a member of Parliament. In September 2008, after the split of the party, she joined the Serbian Progressive Party led by Tomislav Nikolić, and became a member of the parliamentary group "Let's Get Serbia Moving."

Following the resignation of previous Governor Šoškić over a disagreement with adopted amendments to the National Bank of Serbia Law, President of Serbia Tomislav Nikolić proposed and nominated Tabaković to the post, and she was elected as the Governor of the National Bank of Serbia on 6 August 2012.

== Other activities ==
- International Monetary Fund (IMF), Ex-Officio Member of the Board of Governors (since 2012)

== Personal life ==
Tabaković lives in Novi Sad, having resided in Priština until 1999. She has three children.

Government offices
Preceded by Dejan Šoškić	Governor of the National Bank of Serbia; 2012–present	Succeeded by Incumbent
Political offices
Preceded by Milan Beko	Minister of Ownership and Economic Transformation of Serbia; 1998–2000	Succeeded by Oskar Kovač
