= National Bank of Serbia =

Central bank of Serbia

Coordinates: 44°48′13″N 20°27′53″E

National Bank of Serbia Народна банка Србије
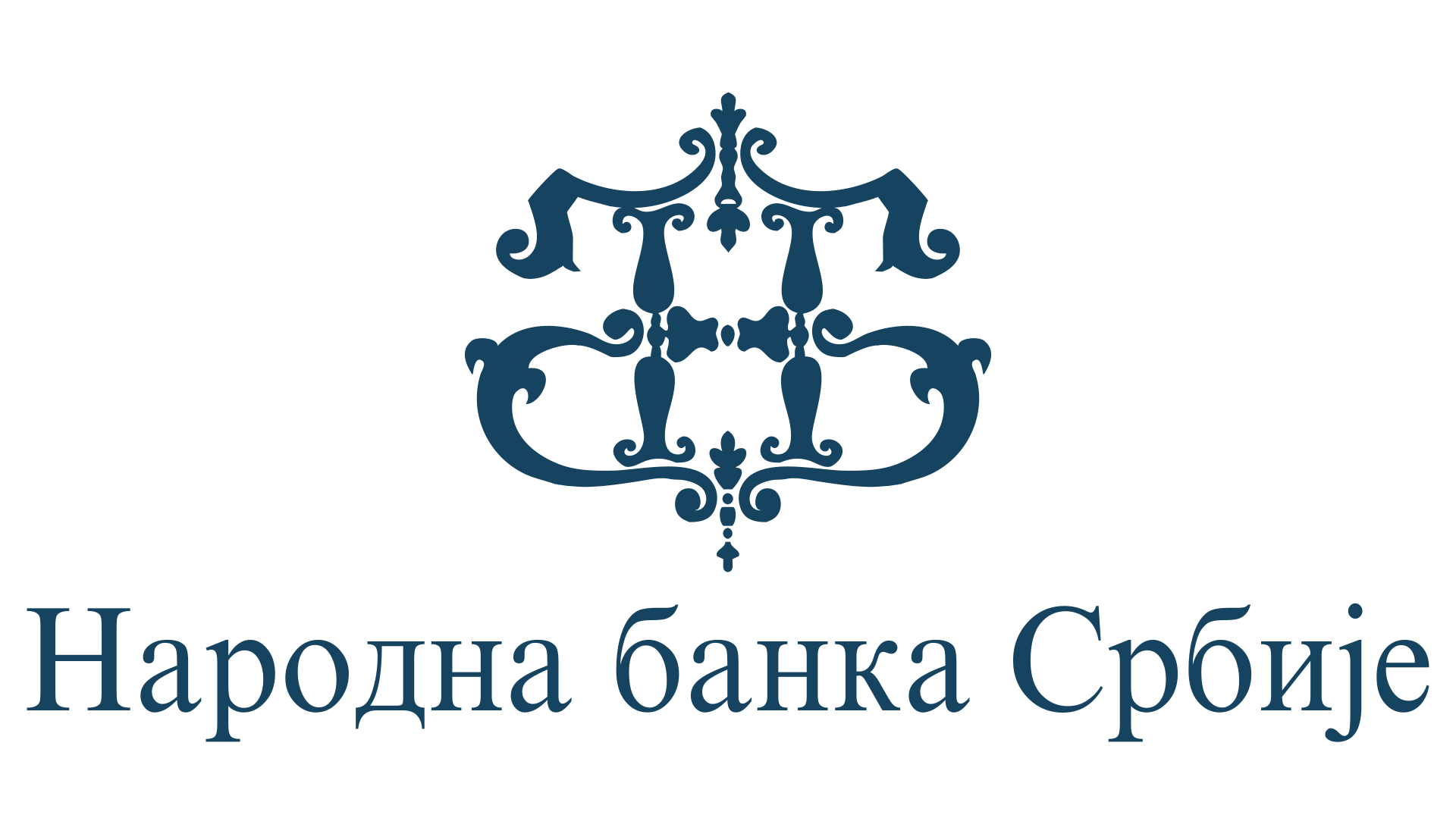

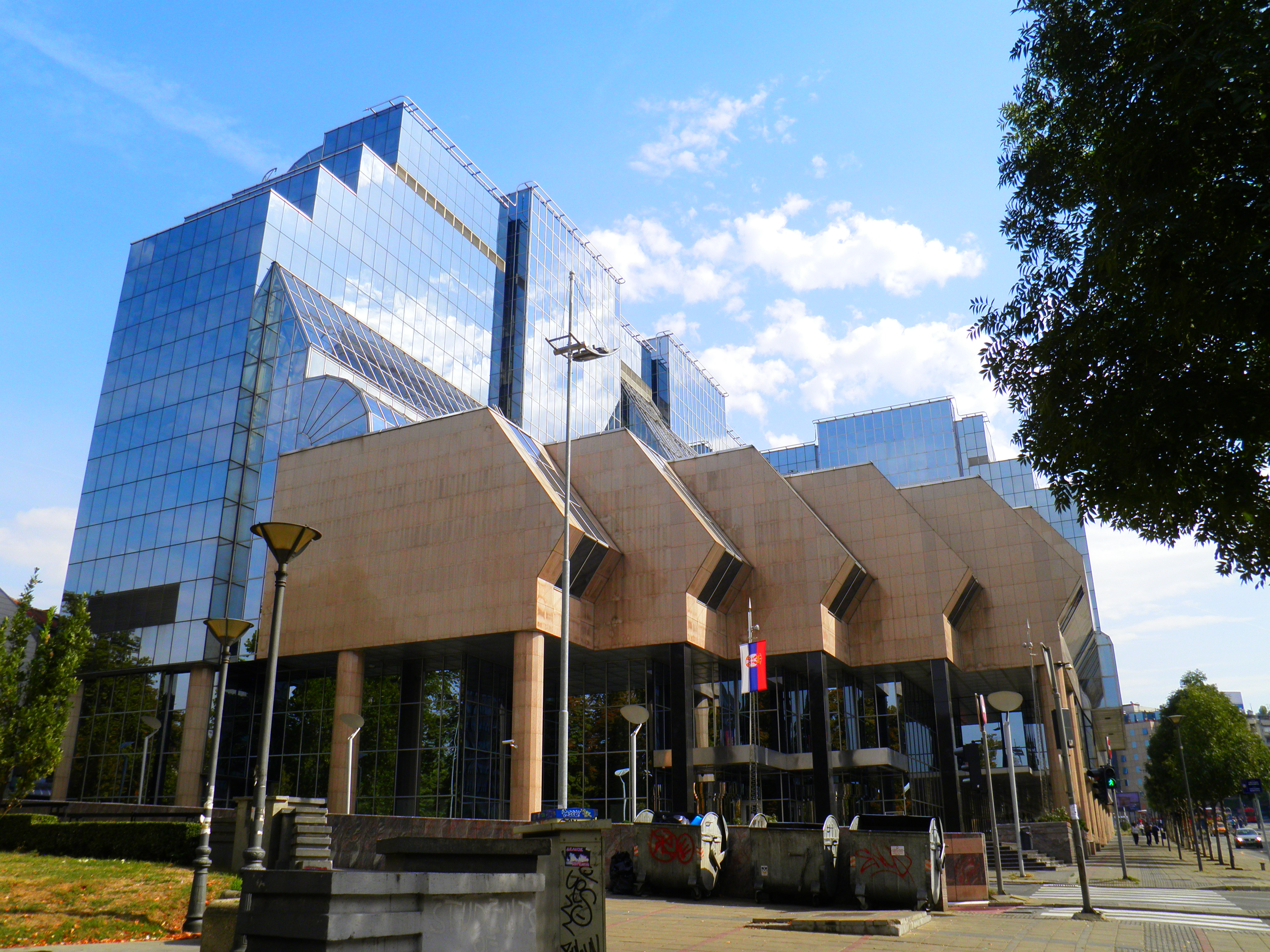
- Headquarters of the National Bank of Serbia
- Central bank of: Serbia
- Headquarters: 17 Nemanjina Street, Belgrade
- Established: 2 July 1884; 142 years ago (current form since 2006)
- Ownership: 100% state ownership
- Governor: Jorgovanka Tabaković
- Currency: Serbian dinar RSD (ISO 4217)
- Reserves: €29.295 billion (2025)
- Bank rate: 5.50%
- Interest on reserves: 4.50%
- Website: nbs.rs

The National Bank of Serbia (Serbian: Народна банка Србије, Narodna banka Srbije) is the central bank of Serbia.

== History ==
The National Bank of Serbia succeeds several institutions, all based in Belgrade, mirroring the complex history of Serbia throughout the 20th centuries. The first of these was established in 1884 as the Privileged National Bank of the Kingdom of Serbia. In 2003 Bank succeeded its immediate predecessor, the National Bank of Yugoslavia in Serbia and Montenegro.

== Missions ==
The responsibilities of the bank include monetary policy, the monopoly on issuance of Serbian banknotes and coins, the protection of price stability, and the promotion of stability of the financial system within Serbia.

The National Bank of Serbia is independent and autonomous in carrying out its tasks laid down by the law, and is accountable for its work to the National Assembly of Serbia. The primary objective of the National Bank of Serbia is to achieve and maintain price stability. Without prejudice to its primary objective, it also contributes to maintaining and strengthening of the stability of the financial system.

The National Bank of Serbia:

- determines and implements the monetary and foreign exchange policies
- manages foreign exchange reserves
- determines and implements, within its scope of authority, the activities and measures aimed at maintaining and strengthening the stability of the financial system
- issues banknotes and coins and manages cash circulation
- regulates, controls and promotes smooth performance of domestic and cross-border payment transactions, in accordance with law
- issues and revokes operating licenses, carries out prudential supervision of bank operations and performs other activities in accordance with the law governing banks
- performs other tasks within its scope of authority, in accordance with law

== Organization ==
The bodies of the NBS are the Executive Board, the Governor and the Council of the Governor. The incumbent governor of the national bank is Jorgovanka Tabaković.

== Governors ==
Since its re-establishment, the National Bank of Serbia has had five governors:

- Mlađan Dinkić (4 February 2003 – 22 July 2003)
- Kori Udovički (23 July 2003 – 25 February 2004)
- Radovan Jelašić (25 February 2004 – 28 July 2010)
- Dejan Šoškić (28 July 2010 – 6 August 2012)
- Jorgovanka Tabaković (6 August 2012 – present)

== Headquarters building ==
The current headquarters building on Slavija Square was designed by architect Grujo Golijanin for the National Bank of Yugoslavia, for which construction started in the early 1990s. It stopped, however, because of Serbia's financial and political challenges of the time. Works restarted in the 2000s and the building was inaugurated in 2006.

== See also ==
- Serbian dinar
- Banking in Serbia
- Insurance in Serbia
- List of banks in Serbia
- List of central banks
- List of financial supervisory authorities by country
