= Cabinet of Miloš Vučević =

- Government of Serbia
- 2024–2025
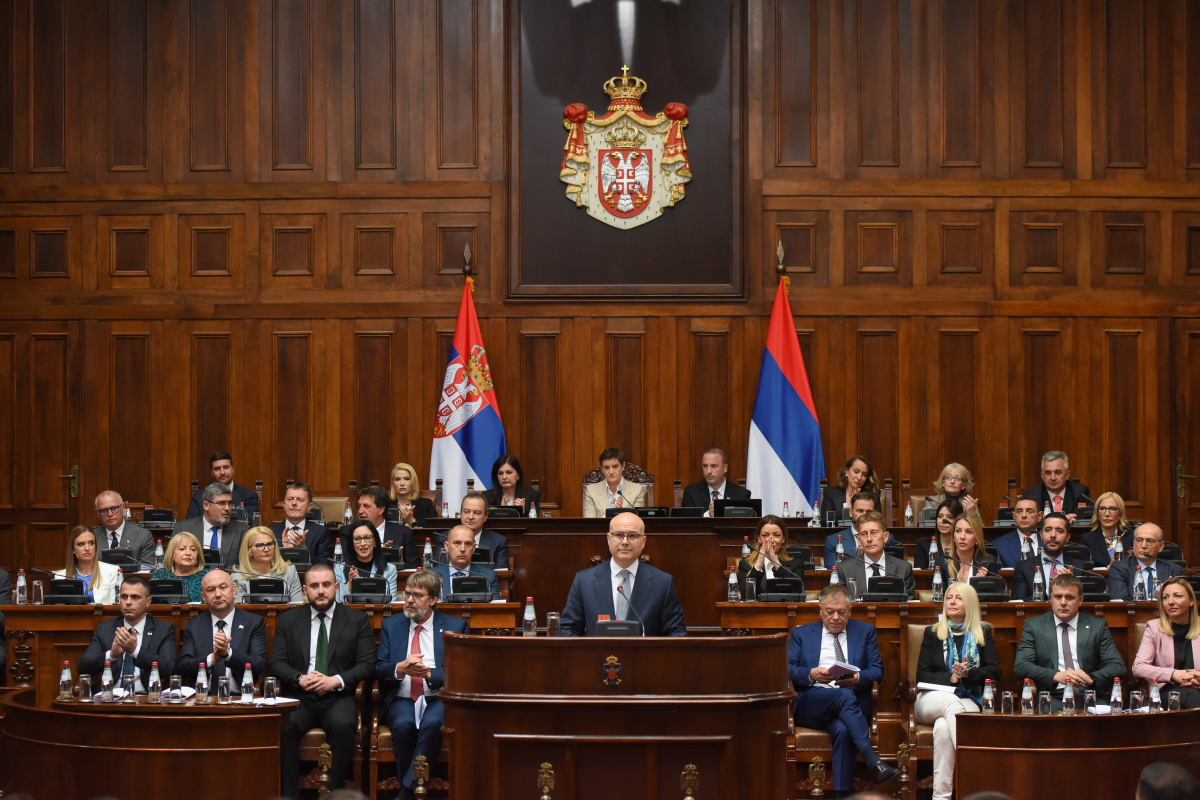
- The government during a swearing-in session, 1 May 2024
- Date formed: 2 May 2024
- Date dissolved: 16 April 2025

People and organisations
- President: Aleksandar Vučić
- Prime Minister: Miloš Vučević
- Deputy Prime Ministers: Siniša Mali, Ivica Dačić, Irena Vujović, Aleksandar Vulin
- No. of ministers: 22 (Note: Excluding ministers without portfolio, deputy prime ministers, and the prime minister); 27 (Note: Excluding deputy prime ministers and the prime minister)
- Total no. of members: 32 (Note: Including ministers without portfolio, deputy prime ministers, and the prime minister)
- Member parties: SNS; SPS; DSHV; PUPS; SDPS; SPP; SSZ; PS; SNP
- Status in legislature: Coalition government

History
- Election: 2023 Serbian parliamentary election
- Legislature term: 14th convocation of the National Assembly
- Incoming formation: 2024 government formation
- Predecessor: Brnabić III
- Successor: Macut I

The cabinet of Miloš Vučević was formed on 2 May 2024, following the latter's election as Prime Minister of Serbia by the National Assembly on the same day. It succeeded the third cabinet of Ana Brnabić and was the incumbent government of Serbia from 2 May 2024 to 16 April 2025.

The Serbian Progressive Party (SNS) came to power in 2012. After the 2023 parliamentary election, Aleksandar Vučić, the president of Serbia, gave Vučević the mandate to form a government. The cabinet is composed of members of SNS, Socialist Party of Serbia (SPS), Democratic Alliance of Croats in Vojvodina (DSHV), Party of United Pensioners of Serbia (PUPS), Social Democratic Party of Serbia (SDPS), and Justice and Reconciliation Party (SPP), Serbian Party Oathkeepers (SSZ), Movement of Socialists (PS), and Serbian People's Party (SNP). With 32 ministers in total, it has the largest amount of ministers of any post-Milošević government.

On 28 January 2025, Vučević resigned after mass protests regarding the Novi Sad railway station canopy collapse and after several incidents where members of the Serbian Progressive Party attacked students in Novi Sad. The cabinet was succeeded by the cabinet of Đuro Macut on 16 April.

== Background ==
The Serbian Progressive Party (SNS) came to power after the 2012 parliamentary election, along with the Socialist Party of Serbia (SPS). In the 2023 parliamentary election, SNS won a majority of seats in the National Assembly of Serbia. After the election, Aleksandar Vučić, the president of Serbia, held negotiations with parliamentary parties from 26 February to 4 March. Vučić gave Miloš Vučević, the president of SNS, the mandate to form a government on 30 March.

== Investiture ==
The investiture vote occurred on 2 May 2024.

Investiture; Miloš Vučević (SNS)
Ballot →	2 May 2024
Required majority →	126 out of 250
Yes: • SNSDS (111); • SPS–Zeleni (12); • VMSZ/SVM (6); • PUPS (6); • SDPS (5); • PS–NSS–USS–RS (5); • JS (5); • MPs not members of any group (2)	152 / 250
No: • SSP (14); • NPS–NLS (13); • NADA (7); • SRCE (7); • DS (7); • ZLF (6); • MI–SN (2); • MI–GIN (2); • MPs not members of any group (3)	61 / 250
Abstentions	0 / 250
Absentees: • NADA (6); • EU (5); • MI–GIN (5); • MI–SN (4); • ZLF (4); • SRCE (2); • SNSDS (2); • SSP (2); • DS (1); • SDPS (1); • SPS–Zeleni (1); • NPS–NLS (1); • MPs not members of any group (3)	37 / 250

=== Supporting parties ===
Party	Main ideology	Political position	Leader
Government parties
Serbian Progressive Party (SNS)	Populism	Big tent	Miloš Vučević
Socialist Party of Serbia (SPS)	Social democracy	Centre-left	Ivica Dačić
Democratic Alliance of Croats in Vojvodina (DSHV)	Croat minority interests	Centre	Tomislav Žigmanov
Party of United Pensioners of Serbia (PUPS)	Pensioners' interests	Centre	Milan Krkobabić
Social Democratic Party of Serbia (SDPS)	Social democracy	Centre-left	Rasim Ljajić
Justice and Reconciliation Party (SPP)	Bosniak minority interests	Centre-right	Usame Zukorlić
Serbian Party Oathkeepers (SSZ)	Ultranationalism	Far-right	Milica Đurđević Stamenkovski
Movement of Socialists (PS)	Left-wing nationalism	Centre-left	Bojan Torbica
Serbian People's Party (SNP)	National conservatism	Right-wing	Nenad Popović
Confidence and supply
United Serbia (JS)	National conservatism	Right-wing	Dragan Marković
Alliance of Vojvodina Hungarians (VMSZ)	Hungarian minority interests	Centre-right	Bálint Pásztor

== Composition ==
The cabinet of Miloš Vučević was composed of 25 ministries. It had the largest amount of ministers of any post-Milošević government.

Portfolio	Name	Party	Took office	Left office	Ref(s)
Prime Minister	Miloš Vučević	SNS	2 May 2024	16 April 2025	
Deputy Prime Ministers	Siniša Mali	SNS	2 May 2024	16 April 2025	
Deputy Prime Ministers	Ivica Dačić	SPS	2 May 2024	16 April 2025	
Deputy Prime Ministers	Irena Vujović	SNS	2 May 2024	16 April 2025	
Deputy Prime Ministers	Aleksandar Vulin	PS	2 May 2024	16 April 2025	
Minister of Finance	Siniša Mali	SNS	2 May 2024	16 April 2025	
Minister of Economy	Adrijana Mesarović	SNS	2 May 2024	16 April 2025	
Minister of Agriculture, Forestry, and Water Management	Aleksandar Martinović	SNS	2 May 2024	16 April 2025	
Minister of Environmental Protection	Irena Vujović	SNS	2 May 2024	16 April 2025	
Minister of Construction, Transport, and Infrastructure	Goran Vesić	SNS	2 May 2024	25 November 2024	
Minister of Mining and Energy	Dubravka Đedović	Independent	2 May 2024	16 April 2025	
Minister of Internal and Foreign Trade	Tomislav Momirović	SNS	2 May 2024	25 November 2024	
Minister of Justice	Maja Popović	Independent	2 May 2024	16 April 2025	
Minister of State Administration and Local Self-Government	Jelena Žarić Kovačević	SNS	2 May 2024	16 April 2025	
Minister of Human and Minority Rights and Social Dialogue	Tomislav Žigmanov	DSHV	2 May 2024	16 April 2025	
Minister of Internal Affairs	Ivica Dačić	SPS	2 May 2024	16 April 2025	
Minister of Defence	Bratislav Gašić	SNS	2 May 2024	16 April 2025	
Minister of Foreign Affairs	Marko Đurić	SNS	2 May 2024	16 April 2025	
Minister of European Integration	Tanja Miščević	Independent	2 May 2024	16 April 2025	
Minister of Education	Slavica Đukić Dejanović	SPS	2 May 2024	16 April 2025	
Minister of Health	Zlatibor Lončar	SNS	2 May 2024	16 April 2025	
Minister of Labour, Employment, Veteran and Social Policy	Nemanja Starović	SNS	2 May 2024	16 April 2025	
Minister of Family Welfare and Demography	Milica Đurđević Stamenkovski	SSZ	2 May 2024	16 April 2025	
Minister of Sports	Zoran Gajić	Independent	2 May 2024	16 April 2025	
Minister of Culture	Nikola Selaković	SNS	2 May 2024	16 April 2025	
Minister of Rural Welfare	Milan Krkobabić	PUPS	2 May 2024	16 April 2025	
Minister of Science, Technological Development, and Innovation	Jelena Begović	SNS	2 May 2024	16 April 2025	
Minister of Tourism and Youth	Husein Memić	SDPS	2 May 2024	16 April 2025	
Minister of Information and Telecommunications	Dejan Ristić	SNS	2 May 2024	16 April 2025	
Minister for Public Investments	Darko Glišić	SNS	2 May 2024	16 April 2025	
Ministers without portfolio	Novica Tončev	SPS	2 May 2024	16 April 2025	
Ministers without portfolio	Đorđe Milićević	SPS	2 May 2024	16 April 2025	
Ministers without portfolio	Usame Zukorlić	SPP	2 May 2024	16 April 2025	
Ministers without portfolio	Nenad Popović	SNP	2 May 2024	16 April 2025	
Ministers without portfolio	Tatjana Macura	Independent	2 May 2024	16 April 2025	
