= Cabinet of Đuro Macut =

Current government of Serbia

- Government of Serbia
- 2025–present
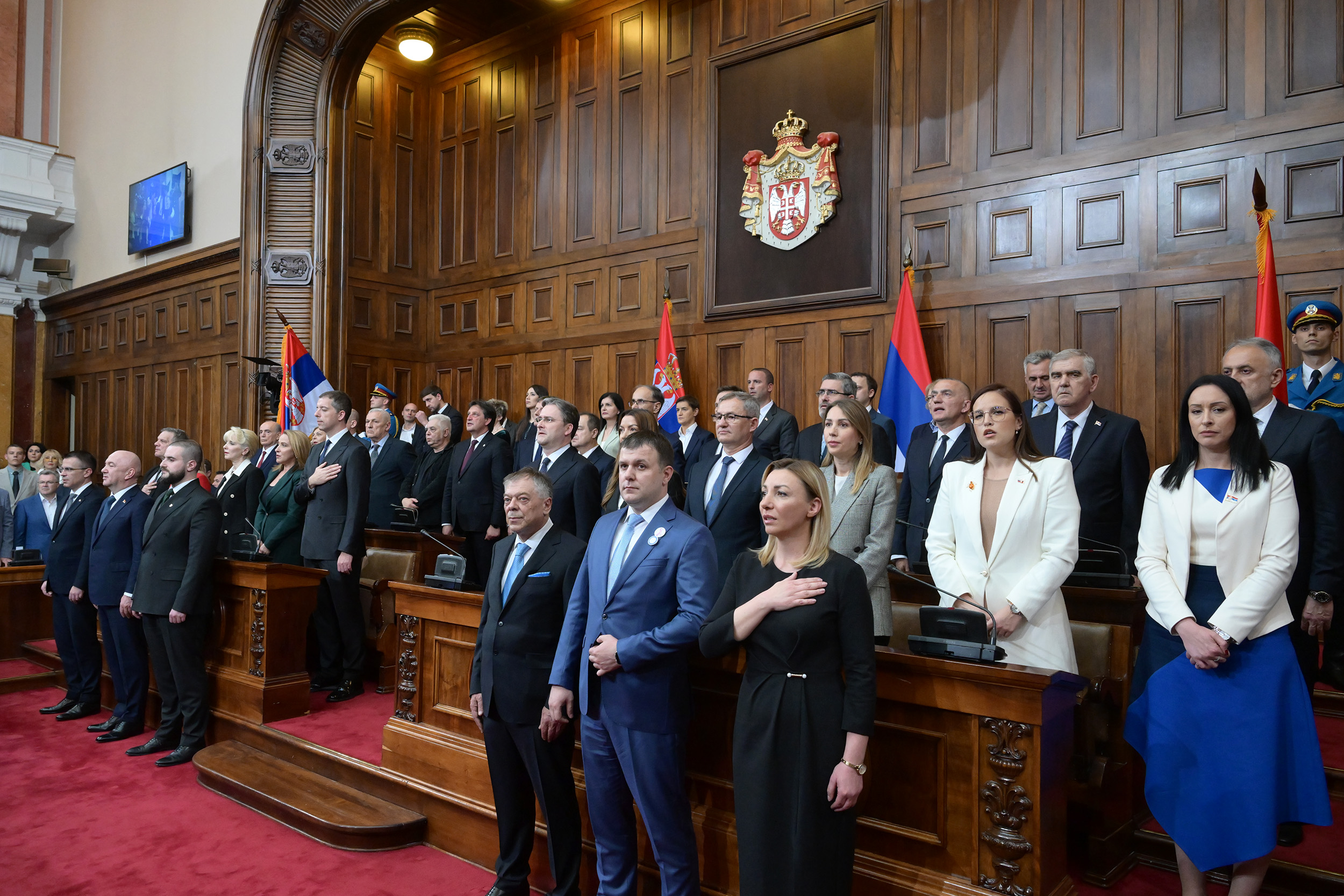
- The government during a swearing-in session, 16 April 2025
- Date formed: 16 April 2025

People and organisations
- President: Aleksandar Vučić; Ana Brnabić (acting); Aleksandar Čupić (acting)
- Prime Minister: Đuro Macut
- Deputy Prime Ministers: Siniša Mali, Ivica Dačić, Adrijana Mesarović
- Member parties: SNS; SPS; PUPS; SDPS; SPP; SSZ; SNP
- Status in legislature: Coalition government

History
- Incoming formation: 2025 government formation
- Election: 2023 Serbian parliamentary election
- Legislature term: 14th convocation of the National Assembly
- Predecessor: Vučević

The cabinet of Đuro Macut was formed on 16 April 2025, following the latter's election as Prime Minister of Serbia by the National Assembly on the same day. It succeeded the cabinet of Miloš Vučević.

The Serbian Progressive Party (SNS) came to power in 2012. After the 2023 Serbian parliamentary election, Aleksandar Vučić, the president of Serbia, gave Miloš Vučević the mandate to form a government. He was elected in May 2024, but resigned amidst anti-corruption protests in January 2025. After the acknowledgment of his resignation by the National Assembly in March, negotiations were held to form a new government. Vučić gave Macut the mandate to form a government in early April.

The cabinet is composed of members of SNS, Socialist Party of Serbia, Party of United Pensioners of Serbia, Social Democratic Party of Serbia, Serbian Party Oathkeepers, Serbian People's Party, and Justice and Reconciliation Party.

== Background ==
The Serbian Progressive Party (SNS) came to power after the 2012 parliamentary election, along with the Socialist Party of Serbia (SPS). In the 2023 parliamentary election, SNS won a majority of seats in the National Assembly of Serbia. After the election, Aleksandar Vučić, the president of Serbia, held negotiations with parliamentary parties from 26 February to 4 March. Vučić gave Miloš Vučević, the president of SNS, the mandate to form a government on 30 March. Vučević was elected prime minister in May 2024. After a group of SNS members physically attacked students in Novi Sad on 28 January 2025, Vučević announced his resignation. Vučević's resignation was acknowledged by the National Assembly on 19 March. After the acknowledgment, negotiations were held for the formation of the new government. Vučić nominated Đuro Macut as the mandate holder for the formation of the new government on 6 April.

== Investiture ==
A National Assembly session, called by Ana Brnabić, started on 15 April 2025, during which the new government was elected. The Alliance of Vojvodina Hungarians and United Serbia announced that they would vote in favour in the investiture vote. The government was voted and sworn in on 16 April.

Investiture; Đuro Macut (Independent)
Ballot →	16 April 2025
Required majority →	126 out of 250
Yes	153 / 250
No	46 / 250
Abstentions	0 / 250
Absentees	51 / 250

== Composition ==
The cabinet of Đuro Macut is composed of 25 ministries. It has the largest amount of ministers of any post-Milošević government. Out of 30 ministers, 22 come from the cabinet of Miloš Vučević.

Portfolio	Name	Party	Took office	Left office	Ref(s)
Prime Minister	Đuro Macut	Independent (PZND)	16 April 2025	Incumbent	
Deputy Prime Ministers	Siniša Mali	SNS	16 April 2025	Incumbent	
Deputy Prime Ministers	Ivica Dačić	SPS	16 April 2025	Incumbent	
Deputy Prime Ministers	Adrijana Mesarović	SNS	16 April 2025	Incumbent	
Minister of Finance	Siniša Mali	SNS	16 April 2025	Incumbent	
Minister of Economy	Adrijana Mesarović	SNS	16 April 2025	Incumbent	
Minister of Agriculture, Forestry, and Water Management	Dragan Glamočić	Independent	16 April 2025	Incumbent	
Minister of Environmental Protection	Sara Pavkov	SNS	16 April 2025	Incumbent	
Minister of Construction, Transport, and Infrastructure	Aleksandra Sofronijević	Independent	16 April 2025	Incumbent	
Minister of Mining and Energy	Dubravka Đedović	Independent	16 April 2025	Incumbent	
Minister of Internal and Foreign Trade	Jagoda Lazarević	Independent	16 April 2025	Incumbent	
Minister of Justice	Nenad Vujić	Independent	16 April 2025	Incumbent	
Minister of State Administration and Local Self-Government	Snežana Paunović	SPS	16 April 2025	Incumbent	
Minister of Human and Minority Rights and Social Dialogue	Demo Beriša	Independent (PZND)	16 April 2025	Incumbent	
Minister of the Interior	Ivica Dačić	SPS	16 April 2025	Incumbent	
Minister of Defence	Bratislav Gašić	SNS	16 April 2025	Incumbent	
Minister of Foreign Affairs	Marko Đurić	SNS	16 April 2025	Incumbent	
Minister of European Integration	Nemanja Starović	SNS	16 April 2025	Incumbent	
Minister of Education	Dejan Vuk Stanković	Independent (PZND)	16 April 2025	Incumbent	
Minister of Health	Zlatibor Lončar	SNS	16 April 2025	Incumbent	
Minister of Labour, Employment, Veteran and Social Policy	Milica Đurđević Stamenkovski	SSZ	16 April 2025	Incumbent	
Minister of Family Welfare and Demography	Jelena Žarić Kovačević	SNS	16 April 2025	Incumbent	
Minister of Sports	Zoran Gajić	Independent	16 April 2025	Incumbent	
Minister of Culture	Nikola Selaković	SNS	16 April 2025	Incumbent	
Minister of Rural Welfare	Milan Krkobabić	PUPS	16 April 2025	Incumbent	
Minister of Science, Technological Development, and Innovation	Béla Bálint	Independent (PZND)	16 April 2025	Incumbent	
Minister of Tourism and Youth	Husein Memić	SDPS	16 April 2025	Incumbent	
Minister of Information and Telecommunications	Boris Bratina	Independent (PZND)	16 April 2025	Incumbent	
Minister for Public Investments	Darko Glišić	SNS	16 April 2025	Incumbent	
Ministers without portfolio	Novica Tončev	SPS	16 April 2025	Incumbent	
Ministers without portfolio	Đorđe Milićević	SPS	16 April 2025	Incumbent	
Ministers without portfolio	Usame Zukorlić	SPP	16 April 2025	Incumbent	
Ministers without portfolio	Nenad Popović	SNP	16 April 2025	Incumbent	
Ministers without portfolio	Tatjana Macura	Independent	16 April 2025	Incumbent	
