= Government of Serbia =

Main body of executive branch of government in Serbia

Government of the Republic of Serbia
- Влада Републике Србије; Vlada Republike Srbije

Overview
- Established: 1805; 221 years ago (as the Serbian Governing Council); 1991; 35 years ago (as the Government of Serbia)
- State: Republic of Serbia
- Leader: Prime Minister (nominated by the President of the Republic)
- Appointed by: National Assembly
- Ministries: 25
- Responsible to: National Assembly
- Headquarters: Government Building, Nemanjina 11, Belgrade
- Website: srbija.gov.rs

The Government of Serbia (Serbian: Влада Србије, romanized: Vlada Srbije), formally the Government of the Republic of Serbia (Serbian: Влада Републике Србије, romanized: Vlada Republike Srbije), commonly abbreviated to Serbian Government (Serbian: српска Влада, romanized: srpska Vlada), is the main executive branch of government in Serbia.

The Government is led by the President of the Government (Serbian: Председник Владе, romanized: Predsednik Vlade), informally abbreviated to premier (Serbian: Премијер, romanized: Premijer) or prime minister. The prime minister is nominated by the president of the Republic from among those candidates who enjoy majority support in the National Assembly; the candidate is then chosen by the Assembly. There are 30 other government members, serving as deputy prime ministers, government ministers or both; they are chosen by the prime minister and confirmed by the National Assembly. The current government is led by Prime Minister Đuro Macut.

The affairs of government are decided by the Cabinet of Ministers, which is the main executive body of the Government. It is composed of the prime minister and ministers and meets weekly at the Government Building in Belgrade, which houses the Office of the Prime Minister as well as the Secretariat-General of the Government.

== Powers ==
The Government is the main executive power of the Serbian state. According to the Constitution of Serbia, the Government:

- determines and guides internal and foreign policies;
- executes laws adopted by the National Assembly;
- adopts regulations and other acts for the purpose of executing laws;
- proposes legislation to the National Assembly
- directs and coordinates the work of state administration and supervises its work

== Composition ==
The government is headed by the prime minister. The prime minister has deputies (appointed by the prime minister with the approval of the National Assembly by absolute majority), currently four, who also serve as government ministers; the first first deputy prime minister also discharges the duties of the prime minister when the latter is incapacitated or absent. There are other ministers (Serbian: министри, romanized: ministri), who are appointed by the prime minister with the approval of the National Assembly by absolute majority. The ministers, currently 25, head individual ministries charged with particular sectors of activities, with the exception of ministers without portfolio, currently five, who are not at the head of ministries. State secretaries (Serbian: државни секретари, romanized: državni sekretari), appointed by the Government for the term of the minister, are the highest officials below minister, responsible to the minister; there are one or more state secretaries in the ministries.

Besides the government ministries, there are numerous interministerial bodies that operate within the framework of the government and are directly subordinated to the Office of Prime Minister:

- Secretariat-General of the Government
- Secretariat for Legislation
- Secretariat for Public Policies
- Office of the National Security Council
- Office for Kosovo and Metohija
- Office for Media Relations
- Office for E-government
- Office for Dual Education
- Office for Public and Cultural Diplomacy
- Office of the Council for Cooperation with the Russian Federation and the People's Republic of China
- Government Human Resources Management Service
- Government Aviation Service
- Directorate for Joint Affairs

== Incumbent government ==
The incumbent cabinet was sworn on 16 April 2025 by a majority vote in the National Assembly. It is the first cabinet of Đuro Macut, who became the prime minister after Miloš Vučević resigned from the office due to anti-corruption protests.

Portfolio	Minister	Party	Took office
Prime Minister
	Đuro Macut	Independent	16 April 2025
Deputy Prime Ministers
Finance	Siniša Mali	SNS	16 April 2025
Internal Affairs	Ivica Dačić	SPS	16 April 2025
Economy	Adrijana Mesarović	SNS	16 April 2025
Ministers
Foreign Affairs	Marko Đurić	SNS	16 April 2025
Defence	Bratislav Gašić	SNS	16 April 2025
Justice	Nenad Vujić	Independent	16 April 2025
Agriculture, Forestry, and Water Management	Dragan Glamočić	Independent	16 April 2025
Environmental Protection	Sara Pavkov	SNS	16 April 2025
Construction, Transport, and Infrastructure	Aleksandra Sofronijević	Independent	16 April 2025
Mining and Energy	Dubravka Đedović	Independent	16 April 2025
Internal and Foreign Trade	Jagoda Lazarević	Independent	16 April 2025
State Administration and Local Self-Government	Snežana Paunović	SPS	16 April 2025
Human and Minority Rights and Social Dialogue	Demo Beriša	Independent	16 April 2025
European Integration	Nemanja Starović	SNS	16 April 2025
Education	Dejan Vuk Stanković	Independent	16 April 2025
Health	Zlatibor Lončar	SNS	16 April 2025
Labour, Employment, Veteran and Social Policy	Milica Đurđević Stamenkovski	SSZ	16 April 2025
Family Welfare and Demography	Jelena Žarić Kovačević	SNS	16 April 2025
Sports	Zoran Gajić	Independent	16 April 2025
Culture	Nikola Selaković	SNS	16 April 2025
Rural Welfare	Milan Krkobabić	PUPS	16 April 2025
Science, Technological Development, and Innovation	Béla Bálint	Independent	16 April 2025
Tourism and Youth	Husein Memić	SDPS	16 April 2025
Information and Telecommunications	Boris Bratina	Independent	16 April 2025
Public Investments	Darko Glišić	SNS	16 April 2025
Ministers without portfolio
	Novica Tončev	SPS	16 April 2025
	Đorđe Milićević	SPS	16 April 2025
	Usame Zukorlić	SPP	16 April 2025
	Nenad Popović	SNP	16 April 2025
	Tatjana Macura	Independent	16 April 2025

== History ==
Since 23 December 1990 (the first multi-party parliamentary elections held following the post-World War II communist rule), Serbia has had a total of eighteen governments headed by fourteen different prime ministers.

Assumed office	Prime Minister	Party in Office (leading)	Cabinet
11 February 1991	Dragutin Zelenović	Socialist Party of Serbia	Cabinet of Dragutin Zelenović
23 December 1992	Radoman Božović	Socialist Party of Serbia	Cabinet of Radoman Božović
10 February 1993	Nikola Šainović	Socialist Party of Serbia	Cabinet of Nikola Šainović
18 March 1994	Mirko Marjanović	Socialist Party of Serbia	Cabinet of Mirko Marjanović I
24 March 1998	Mirko Marjanović	Socialist Party of Serbia	Cabinet of Mirko Marjanović II
25 October 2000	Milomir Minić	Socialist Party of Serbia	Cabinet of Milomir Minić
25 January 2001	Zoran Đinđić; Zoran Živković	Democratic Party	Cabinet of Zoran Đinđić
3 March 2004	Vojislav Koštunica	Democratic Party of Serbia	Cabinet of Vojislav Koštunica I
15 May 2007	Vojislav Koštunica	Democratic Party of Serbia	Cabinet of Vojislav Koštunica II
7 July 2008	Mirko Cvetković	Democratic Party	Cabinet of Mirko Cvetković
27 July 2012	Ivica Dačić	Serbian Progressive Party	Cabinet of Ivica Dačić
27 April 2014	Aleksandar Vučić	Serbian Progressive Party	Cabinet of Aleksandar Vučić I
11 August 2016	Aleksandar Vučić	Serbian Progressive Party	Cabinet of Aleksandar Vučić II
29 June 2017	Ana Brnabić	Serbian Progressive Party	Cabinet of Ana Brnabić I
28 October 2020	Ana Brnabić	Serbian Progressive Party	Cabinet of Ana Brnabić II
26 October 2022	Ana Brnabić	Serbian Progressive Party	Cabinet of Ana Brnabić III
2 May 2024	Miloš Vučević	Serbian Progressive Party	Cabinet of Miloš Vučević
16 April 2025	Đuro Macut	Serbian Progressive Party	Cabinet of Đuro Macut

== See also ==
- Elections in Serbia
