= Second cabinet of Ana Brnabić =

Period in Serbian politics

- 16th Cabinet of Republic of Serbia
- 2020–2022
- Date formed: 28 October 2020
- Date dissolved: 26 October 2022

People and organisations
- Head of state: Aleksandar Vučić
- Head of government: Ana Brnabić
- No. of ministers: 21 (ministers only); 23 (with ministers without portfolio)
- Total no. of members: 29 (including Prime Minister and Deputy Prime Ministers)
- Member parties: SNS, SPS, SDPS, PS, PUPS, SNP

History
- Election: 21 June 2020
- Predecessor: First cabinet of Ana Brnabić
- Successor: Third cabinet of Ana Brnabić

The second cabinet of Ana Brnabić was the Government of Serbia from 2020 to 2022. It was elected on 28 October 2020 by a majority vote in the National Assembly. It succeeded the first cabinet of Ana Brnabić, which was formed in July 2017, shortly after Aleksandar Vučić's departure as prime minister due his election as president of Serbia.

The cabinet is composed of members of the Serbian Progressive Party (SNS), Socialist Party of Serbia (SPS), Movement of Socialists (PS), Party of United Pensioners of Serbia (PUPS), Social Democratic Party of Serbia (SDPS), Serbian People's Party (SNP) and independents. The Alliance of Vojvodina Hungarians (VMSZ), Justice and Reconciliation Party (SPP), and United Peasant Party (USS) serve as confidence and supply in the government.

The government was in acting mode from 15 February 2022, when the 12th convocation of the National Assembly ended due to the proclamation of snap parliamentary elections. It was succeeded by the third cabinet of Ana Brnabić on 26 October 2022.

== History ==
The cabinet comprised ministers from the Serbian Progressive Party (SNS), Socialist Party of Serbia (SPS), Serbian Patriotic Alliance (SPAS), Movement of Socialists (PS), Social Democratic Party of Serbia (SDPS) and the Party of United Pensioners of Serbia (PUPS), as well as some without a party affiliation. The cabinet had 11 women out of 21 total ministers and was among the most gender-balanced governments in the world. Three new ministries were also formed: the Ministry of the Village Care, Ministry of Family and Demography and the Ministry of Human and Minority Rights and Social Dialogue.

== Supporting parties ==
Party	Main ideology	Political position	Leader
Government parties
Serbian Progressive Party (SNS)	Populism	Big tent	Aleksandar Vučić
Socialist Party of Serbia (SPS)	Social democracy	Centre-left	Ivica Dačić
Movement of Socialists (PS)	Left-wing nationalism	Centre-left	Aleksandar Vulin
Party of United Pensioners of Serbia (PUPS)	Pensioners' interests	Centre	Milan Krkobabić
Social Democratic Party of Serbia (SDPS)	Social democracy	Centre-left	Rasim Ljajić
Serbian People's Party (SNP)	National conservatism	Right-wing	Nenad Popović
Confidence and supply
United Serbia (JS)	National conservatism	Right-wing	Dragan Marković
Alliance of Vojvodina Hungarians (VMSZ)	Hungarian minority interests	Centre-right	István Pásztor
Justice and Reconciliation Party (SPP)	Bosniak minority interests	Right-wing	Muamer Zukorlić

== Cabinet members ==
Office	Portrait	Name	Term of office	Party
Prime Minister		Ana Brnabić	29 June 2017 – 26 October 2022	Serbian Progressive Party
Deputy Prime Minister		Branko Ružić	28 October 2020 – 26 October 2022	Socialist Party of Serbia
Deputy Prime Minister		Zorana Mihajlović	27 April 2014 – 26 October 2022	Serbian Progressive Party
Deputy Prime Minister		Nebojša Stefanović	11 August 2016 – 26 October 2022	Serbian Progressive Party
Deputy Prime Minister		Maja Gojković	28 October 2020 – 26 October 2022	Serbian Progressive Party
Deputy Prime Minister		Branislav Nedimović	28 October 2020 – 26 October 2022	Serbian Progressive Party
Minister of Foreign Affairs		Nikola Selaković	28 October 2020 – 26 October 2022	Serbian Progressive Party
Minister of Internal Affairs		Aleksandar Vulin	28 October 2020 – 26 October 2022	Movement of Socialists
Minister of Defence		Nebojša Stefanović	28 October 2020 – 26 October 2022	Serbian Progressive Party
Minister of Finance		Siniša Mali	29 May 2018 – 26 October 2022	Serbian Progressive Party
Minister of Economy		Anđelka Atanasković	28 October 2020 – 26 October 2022	Serbian Progressive Party
Minister of Rural Welfare		Milan Krkobabić	28 October 2020 – 26 October 2022	Party of United Pensioners of Serbia
Minister of Education, Science and Technological Development		Branko Ružić	28 October 2020 – 26 October 2022	Socialist Party of Serbia
Minister of Mining and Energy		Zorana Mihajlović	28 October 2020 – 26 October 2022	Serbian Progressive Party
Minister of Culture and Information		Maja Gojković	28 October 2020 – 26 October 2022	Serbian Progressive Party
Minister of Agriculture, Forestry and Water Economy		Branislav Nedimović	11 August 2016 – 26 October 2022	Serbian Progressive Party
Minister of Construction, Transport and Infrastructure		Tomislav Momirović	28 October 2020 – 26 October 2022	Serbian Progressive Party
Minister of Environmental Protection		Irena Vujović	28 October 2020 – 26 October 2022	Serbian Progressive Party
Minister of European Integration		Jadranka Joksimović	29 June 2017 – 26 October 2022	Serbian Progressive Party
Minister of Family Welfare and Demography		Ratko Dmitrović	28 October 2020 – 26 October 2022	Independent (nominated by Serbian Patriotic Alliance)
Minister of Health		Zlatibor Lončar	27 April 2014 – 26 October 2022	Serbian Progressive Party
Minister of Human and Minority Rights		Gordana Čomić	28 October 2020 – 26 October 2022	Independent
Minister of Justice		Maja Popović	28 October 2020 – 26 October 2022	Independent
Minister of Labour, Employment, Veteran and Social Policy		Darija Kisić Tepavčević	28 October 2020 – 26 October 2022	Independent (until November 2021)
Minister of Labour, Employment, Veteran and Social Policy		Darija Kisić Tepavčević	28 October 2020 – 26 October 2022	Serbian Progressive Party (since November 2021)
Minister of Public Administration and Local Self-Government		Marija Obradović	28 October 2020 – 26 October 2022	Serbian Progressive Party
Minister of Trade, Tourism and Telecommunications		Tatjana Matić	28 October 2020 – 26 October 2022	Social Democratic Party of Serbia
Minister of Youth and Sports		Vanja Udovičić	2 September 2013 – 26 October 2022	Independent
Minister without portfolio		Nenad Popović	29 June 2017 – 26 October 2022	Serbian People's Party
Minister without portfolio		Novica Tončev	28 October 2020 – 26 October 2022	Socialist Party of Serbia
