= Slavica Đukić Dejanović =

Serbian politician (born 1951)

- Славица Ђукић Дејановић
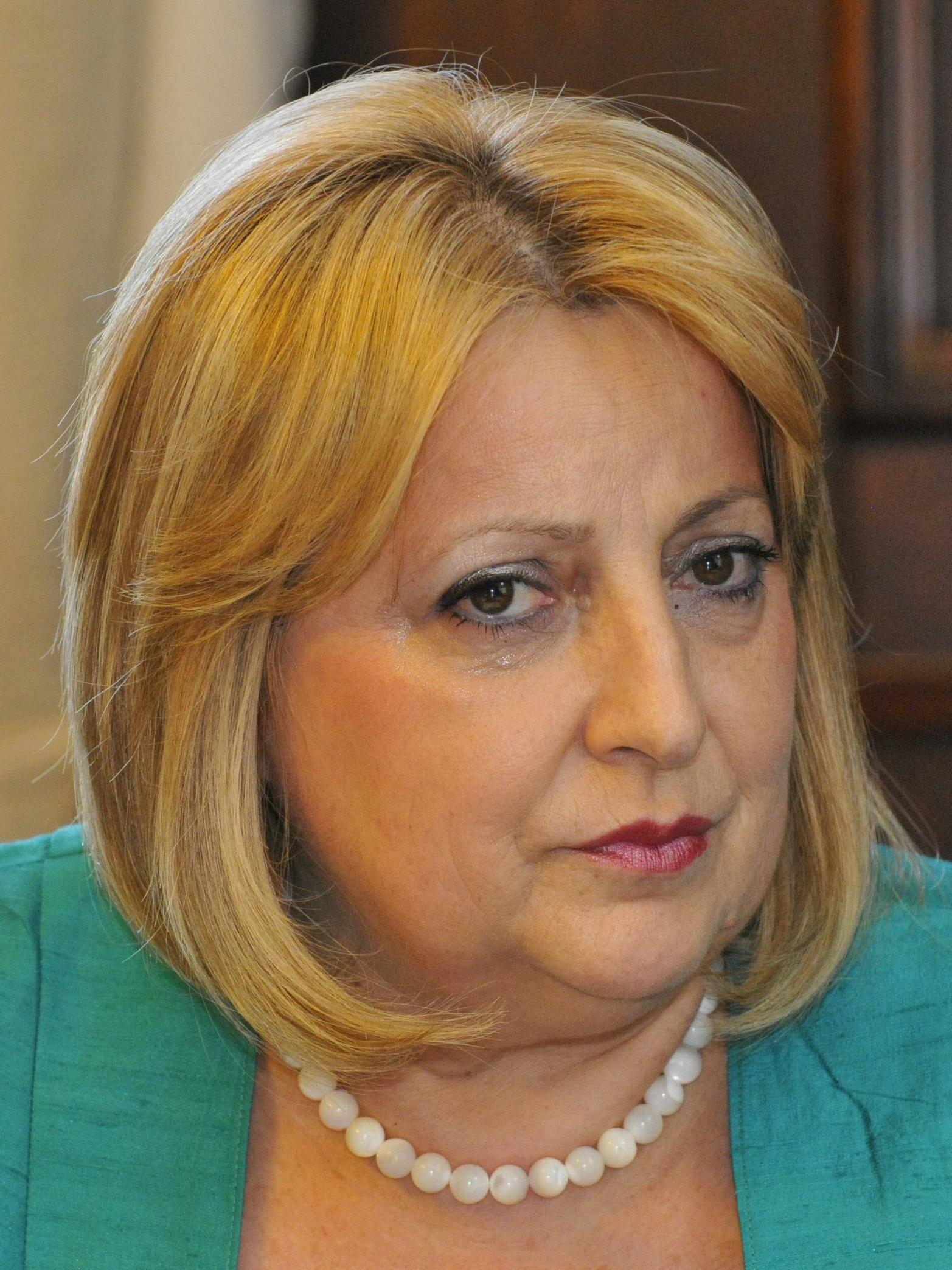
- Đukić Dejanović in 2010

Minister of Education
- In office 25 July 2023 – 16 April 2025
- Prime Minister: Ana Brnabić; Ivica Dačić (acting); Miloš Vučević
- Preceded by: Branko Ružić; Đorđe Milićević (acting)
- Succeeded by: Dejan Vuk Stanković

Minister without portfolio
- In office 11 August 2016 – 28 October 2020
- Prime Minister: Aleksandar Vučić; Ivica Dačić (acting); Ana Brnabić
- Preceded by: Velimir Ilić
- Succeeded by: Novica Tončev

Minister of Health
- In office 27 July 2012 – 27 April 2014
- Prime Minister: Ivica Dačić
- Preceded by: Zoran Stanković
- Succeeded by: Zlatibor Lončar

President of Serbia
- Acting
- In office 5 April 2012 – 31 May 2012
- Prime Minister: Mirko Cvetković
- Preceded by: Boris Tadić
- Succeeded by: Tomislav Nikolić

President of the National Assembly
- In office 25 June 2008 – 31 May 2012
- Prime Minister: Mirko Cvetković
- Preceded by: Oliver Dulić
- Succeeded by: Nebojša Stefanović

Minister of Family Care
- In office 24 October 2000 – 25 January 2001
- Prime Minister: Milomir Minić
- Preceded by: Miroslav Nedeljković
- Succeeded by: Dragan Milovanović; (Labour and Employment)

Personal details
- Born: 4 July 1951 (age 75) Rača, PR Serbia, FPR Yugoslavia
- Party: SPS
- Spouse: Ranko Dejanović
- Education: University of Belgrade

Slavica Đukić Dejanović (Note: Serbian Cyrillic: Славица Ђукић Дејановић, pronounced [slâʋitsa dʑûkitɕ dɛjǎːnɔʋitɕ]) (born 4 July 1951) is a Serbian politician who served as minister of education from 2023 to 2025. A long-time member of the Socialist Party of Serbia, she previously served as minister of family care in the transitional government of Milomir Minić, president of the National Assembly of Serbia from 2008 to 2012, acting president of Serbia after the resignation of Boris Tadić, minister of health from 2012 to 2014, and minister without portfolio in charge of demography and population policy from 2016 to 2020.

Dejanović is the second woman who served as president of the National Assembly, after Nataša Mićić, who served the role from 2001 to 2004, and the first one in the independent Serbia. She was also the first woman, to hold the post of head of state of Serbia since independence in 2006.

== Early life ==
Dejanović was born on 4 July 1951 in Rača near Kragujevac, where she finished her elementary and secondary school. She graduated at the University of Belgrade School of Medicine, where she received her M.A. in 1983. and Ph.D. in 1986.

== Career ==
=== Professional ===
Dejanović has worked at the University of Kragujevac Medical School since 1982, where she was first assistant, then docent and then as of 1992 she was an assistant professor. In 1996 Dejanović became a full professor. She also served as the Director of Clinical-Hospital Center in Kragujevac from 1995 to 2001. when she was removed from management functions but she remained to work as a doctor. Dejanović is the director of the Clinic for Psychiatry in Kragujevac and vice dean of Medical School and the vice president of the Association of Psychiatrists of Serbia. She was the president of the Commission for Drugs and a member of the Governing Board of Medical research within Section of science and technology.

=== Politics ===
Parallel with her doctor's career, Dejanović was building a political career as well. She became a member of the League of Communists of Yugoslavia when she was 18 years old. Dejanović was the chairman of Standing Action Conference of the League and a member of the Municipal Committee of the League for Kragujevac. Dejanović has been a member of the Socialist Party of Serbia since 12 September 1990. She was a member of the Main Board, the executive committee of the SPS and the chairwoman of Kragujevac Regional Committee of the SPS. She was elected for the vice-president of SPS for the first time in 1996 and remained in that position until April 1997. She was elected for the same function again on 12 May 2002 and reelected on 4 December 2006. In two terms she served as the MP in the National Assembly of Serbia and two terms as a Federal Deputy. In the interim Serbian government between October 2000 and January 2001 she was the minister for the care of the family.

On 25 June 2008, Dejanović was elected the President of the National Assembly of Serbia. Following the decision of President Boris Tadić to resign and seek re-election in Serbian presidential elections on 6 May 2012, Slavica Đukić Dejanović became Acting President of Serbia on 5 April 2012.

She served as minister of health from 27 July 2012 to 27 April 2014 and as minister without portfolio from 2016 to 2020. After leaving the government, she began working at the Acibadem Bel Medic hospital.

In June 2023, she was proposed by the government of Serbia to become the minister of education after Branko Ružić's resignation.

== Political positions ==
She was previously a staunch defender of Slobodan Milošević.

While speaking to the Crime and Corruption Reporting Network (KRIK) about her assets, she has said that "officials should be completely exposed to the public and the truth in detail. People should know who their ministers and officials are, especially with regards to their properties".

She has declared herself to be supportive of the LGBT community and pride parades, even participating in the Belgrade Pride in 2016. She supports abortion rights, but has also said that "there would be even more of us if there were no abortions".

== Personal life ==
Besides Serbian, she speaks English and Russian. Her husband, Ranko Dejanović, took part in the controversial privatisation of Zastava Elektro that occurred in the 2000s and an indictment was brought against him in Kragujevac Court.

== Notes ==
Political offices
Preceded by Rada Trajković	Minister of Family Welfare; 2000–2001	Recreated Title next held by Ratko Dmitrović
Preceded by Oliver Dulić	President of the National Assembly; 2008–2012	Succeeded by Nebojša Stefanović
Preceded by Boris Tadić	President of Serbia; Acting; 2012	Succeeded by Tomislav Nikolić
Preceded by Zoran Stanković	Minister of Health; 2012–2014	Succeeded by Zlatibor Lončar
Preceded by Velimir Ilić	Minister without portfolio 2016–2020; With: Milan Krkobabić; Jadranka Joksimović (2016–2017); Nenad Popović (2017–2020)	Succeeded by Novica Tončev
Preceded by Branko Ružić	Minister of Education; 2023–	Incumbent
