= Pantović =

Pantović (Serbian: Пантовић) is a Serbian surname. Notable people with the surname include:

- Miloš Pantović (born 1996), Serbian footballer
- Ognjen Pantović (born 1989), Serbian politician
- Zvonko Pantović (born 1966), Serbian singer
