= Alavanja =

Alavanja is a surname found in Croatia and Serbia.

Notable people with the surname include:

- Goran Alavanja (1963–1990), Croatian Serb policeman killed in the Log Revolution
- Lazo Alavanja (born 1977), American soccer player
- Slobodan Alavanja (born 1985), Serbian politician
