= Ministry of Rural Welfare (Serbia) =

Government ministry of Serbia

- Министарство за бригу о селу Ministarstvo za brigu o selu

Ministry overview
- Formed: 26 October 2020; 5 years ago
- Jurisdiction: Government of Serbia
- Headquarters: Palace of Serbia, Bulevar Mihajla Pupina 2, Belgrade
- Minister responsible: Milan Krkobabić
- Website: mbs.gov.rs

The Ministry of Rural Welfare (Serbian: Министарство за бригу о селу, romanized: Ministarstvo za brigu o selu) is a ministry in the Government of Serbia, created by a vote of the National Assembly of Serbia on 26 October 2020. The current minister is Milan Krkobabić, who has been in office throughout the ministry's existence.

== History ==
Prior to his appointment as Minister of Rural Welfare, Milan Krkobabić served from 2016 to 2020 as a minister without portfolio with responsibility for regional development. During this time, he oversaw several aspects of what would later become the Ministry of Rural Welfare.

When Krkobabić was appointed Minister of Rural Welfare, he indicated that one of his priorities would be organizing the transfer of uncultivated state land to young farmers and young experts. In April 2021, he spoke in favour of creating a "green ring" around Belgrade to supply fresh and healthy food products to several Serbian cities. At the same time, he also announced a program for allocating empty houses, of which he indicated there were around 150,000 in Serbia. Later in the year, he announced that a competition for empty rural houses would begin symbolically after June 28, recognized in Serbia as Vidovdan.

== Responsibilities ==
The ministry is generally responsible for ensuring the economic vitality of Serbia's rural communities, many of which have been declining in population and losing their younger residents to out-migration. The ministry performs tasks related to: strategic consideration of the position of the village and the rural population; proposing measures and activities to improve living and working conditions in rural areas; nurturing tradition and traditional way of life in the countryside, in order to preserve the cultural and historical content of rural areas.

== Organization ==
The ministry is organized into following departments:

- Department for strategic consideration of the position of villages and rural population
- Department for improvement of living and working conditions in the countryside
- Department for protection of rural traditions, preservation of cultural and historical contents, and promotion of cultural activities
- Department for international cooperation and European integration

== List of ministers ==
Political Party: PUPS

Name	Party	Term of Office		Prime Minister (Cabinet)
Minister of Rural Welfare
Milan Krkobabić (born 1952)	PUPS	28 October 2020	Incumbent	Brnabić (II • III); Vučević (I); Macut (I)
