= Zukorlić =

Zukorlić (Cyrillic: Зукорлић) is a surname. Notable people with the surname include:

- Muamer Zukorlić (1970–2021), Serbian Bosniak politician and Islamic theologian
- Usame Zukorlić (born 1992), Serbian Bosniak politician and economist
