= Slobodan Alavanja =

Serbian politician (born 1985)

Slobodan Alavanja (Serbian Cyrillic: Слободан Алавања; born 22 February 1985) is a politician in Serbia. He was elected to the National Assembly of Serbia in the 2020 Serbian parliamentary election. Alavanja is a member of the Serbian People's Party (Srpska narodna partija; SNP).

== Private career ==
Alavanja lives in the Novi Sad municipality of Petrovaradin, in the province of Vojvodina. He holds a bachelor's degree from the University of Novi Sad Faculty of Sports and Tourism (2012) and a master's degree from the University of Belgrade Faculty of Security (2014). He has been a fitness trainer, worked for Novi Sad's city administration from sports and youth in 2012–13, and now works at the Provincial Institute for Sports and Sports Medicine. In 2017, he represented the institute on a mission to Russia.

== Politician ==
The SNP contested the 2020 Serbian parliamentary election in an alliance with the Serbian Progressive Party. Alavanja received the eighty-sixth position on the party's electoral list and campaigned with party leader Nenad Popović and other SNP members during the election. He was elected when the list won a landslide majority with 188 mandates. He is now a member of the committee on the diaspora and Serbs in the region; a deputy member of the committee on education, science, technological development, and the information society; a member of the subcommittee on youth and sports; and a member of Serbia's parliamentary friendship groups with Australia, China, and Russia.
