= Dejan Kovačević (Socialist Party of Serbia politician) =

Serbian politician (1937–2021)

Dejan Kovačević (Serbian Cyrillic: Дејан Ковачевић; 1937–2021) was an engineer and politician in Serbia. He was director of the bridge-building company Mostogradnja, served in the National Assembly of Serbia from 1994 to 1997, and was a minister in the Government of Serbia from 1997 to 2001. Kovačević was a member of the Socialist Party of Serbia (Socijalistička partija Srbije, SPS).

== Early life and private career ==
Kovačević was born in Banja Luka, in what was then the Vrbas Banovina of the Kingdom of Yugoslavia. He graduated from the University of Belgrade Faculty of Civil Engineering and worked as an engineer in the construction of the Đerdap hydroelectric power plant, the Belgrade–Bar railway, and the Gazela Bridge, as well as for projects in Algeria, Iraq, and Mozambique. He later became director of Mostogradnja in Belgrade.

In July 1992, against the backdrop of the ongoing Yugoslav Wars and international sanctions, Kovačević announced that a planned Belgrade bypass for fast transit from the Middle East to Western Europe would be postponed indefinitely.

During the 1999 NATO bombing of Yugoslavia, The Sunday Times ran an article identifying Kovačević as one of a number of "plutocrats" in the Serbian government, highlighting the fact that he was still director of Mostogradnja while serving as a cabinet minister. A subsequent article in The New York Times asserted that Mostogradnja had won large government contracts from Kovačević's ministry.

== Politician ==
=== Parliamentarian ===
Kovačević was a founding member of the Socialist Party in 1990. He received the sixth position on the party's electoral list for Belgrade in the 1993 Serbian parliamentary election and was given a mandate when the list won sixteen seats. (From 1992 to 2000, Serbia's electoral law stipulated that one-third of parliamentary mandates would be assigned to candidates from successful lists in numerical order, while the remaining two-thirds would be distributed amongst other candidates at the discretion of the sponsoring parties. It was common practice for the latter mandates to be awarded out of numerical order. Kovačević did not automatically receive a seat by virtue of his list position, though he was included in his party's delegation all the same.) The Socialist Party won the election; Kovačević took his seat when the assembly convened in January 1994 and served as a government supporter.

=== Government minister ===
Kovačević was appointed to the government of Serbian prime minister Mirko Marjanović on 11 February 1997 as a minister without portfolio in charge of capital infrastructure projects. In July 1997, he announced that the Serbian government would finance more than four hundred road construction and other capital projects with funding from real sources; he noted that nine hundred million dinars would be acquired by the sale of oil derivates and that about five hundred fifty million dinars would be used from the Serbian Development Fund. Three months later, he expressed concern that lower-than-expected cement production was hindering the country's infrastructure projects and urged construction firms to "use all legal possibilities to provide necessary building material and respect the deadlines." He was able to report in December 1997 that 1,110 kilometres of trunk, regional, and local roads had been constructed in Serbia in the previous year.

He received in the third position on the SPS's list for the smaller, redistributed division of Palilula in the 1997 parliamentary election; the list won four seats, and he did not receive a mandate for a new assembly term. The Socialist Party won the election with fewer seats than in 1993, due in part to a strong performance by the far-right Serbian Radical Party (Srpska radikalna stranka, SRS).

In February 1998, the SPS formed a new coalition government with the SRS and the Yugoslav Left (Jugoslovenska Levica, JUL). Kovačević was promoted to construction minister, with many of the same responsibilities as before. He also served as a member of the Kosovo and Metohija provisional executive council.

During the 1999 NATO bombing of Yugoslavia, Kovačević was a key minister in charge of rebuilding demolished and damaged installations. Following the conflict, he appeared at a number of high-profile re-openings of bridges and highways, including in Novi Sad, Subotica, Leskovac, and Biljanovac (where a bridge over the Ibar River had been reconstructed). Kovačević speculated in late 1999 that inflation in Serbia had been "orchestrated from abroad" as a continued act of aggression against the country.

After the fall of Yugoslavian president Slobodan Milošević in October 2000, Serbia established a transitional government pending new elections. The government consisted of members of the SPS, the Democratic Opposition of Serbia (Demokratska opozicija Srbije, DOS), and the Serbian Renewal Movement (Srpski pokret obnove, SPO); Kovačević continued to serve as construction minister in the transitional period.

For the 2000 Serbian parliamentary election, the entire country was counted as a single electoral division and all mandates were awarded to candidates at the discretion of the sponsoring parties or coalitions. Kovačević appeared in the ninety-fifth position on the SPS's list, which was mostly alphabetical. The list won thirty-seven seats, and he was not chosen for the party's delegation. His ministerial term ended in January 2001, when a new ministry was formed consisting only of DOS members.

=== Belgrade city politics ===
Kovačević appeared on the SPS's list for the City Assembly of Belgrade in the 2008 Serbian local elections. During the campaign, he appeared with mayoral candidate Žarko Obradović for a pledge to construct three new bridges. The list won six seats, and he was not awarded a mandate.

== Death ==
Kovačević died in Belgrade in March 2021. SPS leader Ivica Dačić praised him as a "comrade-in-arms and builder."
