= Government Human Resources Management Service (Serbia) =

Human resources service of the Government of Serbia

Government Human Resources Management Service is a service of the Government of Serbia, established in 2005 in accordance with the Law on Civil Servants. Its role is to provide continuous support to the reform of public administration in accordance with the principles of professionalization, depoliticization, rationalization and modernization, set out by the Public Administration Reform Strategy, and to ensure the implementation and further development of established standards and procedures in processes that make up Human Potential Management in public administration.

== Responsibilities ==
Government Human Resources Management Service has the following responsibilities:

- To ensure that job descriptions, the application of established criteria for job evaluation and job classification into grades and types are consistent and uniform in all public administration authorities by giving opinions about staffing table rulebooks. To prepare for the Government, a proposal of the personnel plan for public administration authorities for each fiscal year, and to ensure proper implementation of the adopted personnel plan. To publish competitions for public administration job openings on its website. To take part in selection panels that conduct competitions to fill vacancies in public administration and to ensure proper conduct of the competitions. To test the knowledge, skills, and abilities of competing participants. To maintain the Central Personnel Registry as a database of public administration staff. To maintain the internal labour market, help civil servants with their transfer, and assist authorities in solving their staffing needs. To make reports on the annual assessment of civil servants and suggest measures for standardizing the methods for determining marks. To perform specialist and technical work for the High Civil Service Council and the Government Appeals Board.

== Organization ==
Government Human Resources Management Service is managed by the director of the service, who is responsible for his work to the secretary general of the Government of Serbia.

There are three departments of the service.
