= Ministry of Education (Serbia) =

Government ministry of Serbia

- Министарство просвете Ministarstvo prosvete

Ministry overview
- Formed: 11 February 1991; 35 years ago
- Jurisdiction: Government of Serbia
- Headquarters: Nemanjina Street 22–26, Belgrade
- Minister responsible: Dejan Vuk Stanković
- Website: mpn.gov.rs

The Ministry of Education (Serbian: Министарство просвете, romanized: Ministarstvo prosvete) is a ministry in the Government of Serbia that oversees the country's education system. Dejan Vuk Stanković is the incumbent minister.

== History ==
The Ministry of Education, Science, and Technological Development was established in 1991. From 2001 to 2007, the Ministry of Youth and Sports was merged into the Ministry of Education. It was later split from the Ministry and reestablished. The Ministry of Science and Technological development, which had existed under different names since 1991, was merged into the education ministry 2011. When the third cabinet of Ana Brnabić was established in 2022, it was again separated from the Ministry of Education as the Ministry of Science, Technological development, and Innovation.

== Subordinate bodies ==
There are several bodies that are subordinated to the Ministry:

- Institute for the Advancement of Education
- Institute for the Evaluation of the Quality of Education
- Intellectual Property Office

== List of ministers ==
Political Party: SPS JUL GSS DSS n-p

No.	Portrait	Minister	Took office	Left office	Time in office	Party	Cabinet
Minister of Education
1	Dimitrije Dimitrijević	Dimitrije Dimitrijević	11 February 1991	21 June 1991	130 days	SPS	Zelenović
2	Danilo Ž. Marković	Danilo Ž. Marković (1933–2018)	31 July 1991	14 July 1993	1 year, 348 days	SPS	Zelenović; Božović; Šainović
3	Milivoje Lazić	Milivoje Lazić (born 1938)	14 July 1993	18 March 1994	247 days	SPS	Šainović
4	Dragoslav Mladenović	Dragoslav Mladenović (1937–2003)	18 March 1994	11 February 1997	2 years, 330 days	SPS	Marjanović I
5	Jovo Todorović	Jovo Todorović (1937–2015)	11 February 1997	11 April 2000	3 years, 60 days	SPS	Marjanović I–II
6	Milivoje Simonović	Milivoje Simonović (1951–2000)	11 April 2000	10 June 2000 †	60 days	JUL	Marjanović II
–	Katarina Lazović	Katarina Lazović (1935–2003); Acting	10 June 2000	13 July 2000	33 days	JUL	Marjanović II
7	Katarina Lazović	Katarina Lazović (1935–2003)	13 July 2000	24 October 2000	103 days	JUL	Marjanović II
8	Mihailo Jokić	Mihailo Jokić (born 1948)	24 October 2000	25 January 2001	93 days	SPS	Minić
Minister of Education and Sports
9	Gašo Knežević	Gašo Knežević (1953–2014)	25 January 2001	3 March 2004	3 years, 38 days	GSS	Đinđić–Živković
10	Ljiljana Čolić	Ljiljana Čolić (born 1956)	3 March 2004	16 September 2004	197 days	DSS	Koštunica I
–	Milan Brdar	Milan Brdar (born 1952); Acting	16 September 2004	19 October 2004	33 days	DSS	Koštunica I
11	Slobodan Vuksanović	Slobodan Vuksanović (born 1965)	19 October 2004	15 May 2007	2 years, 208 days	DSS	Koštunica I
Minister of Education
12	Zoran Lončar	Zoran Lončar (born 1965)	15 May 2007	7 July 2008	1 year, 53 days	DSS	Koštunica II
13	Žarko Obradović	Žarko Obradović (born 1960)	7 July 2008	14 March 2011	2 years, 250 days	SPS	Cvetković
Minister of Education, Science, and Technological Development
(13)	Žarko Obradović	Žarko Obradović (born 1960)	14 March 2011	2 September 2013	2 years, 172 days	SPS	Cvetković; Dačić
14	Tomislav Jovanović	Tomislav Jovanović (born 1951)	2 September 2013	27 April 2014	237 days	Independent	Dačić
15	Srđan Verbić	Srđan Verbić (born 1970)	27 April 2014	11 August 2016	2 years, 106 days	Independent	Vučić I
16	Mladen Šarčević	Mladen Šarčević (born 1957)	11 August 2016	28 October 2020	4 years, 78 days	Independent	Vučić II; Brnabić I
17	Branko Ružić	Branko Ružić (born 1975)	28 October 2020	26 October 2022	1 year, 363 days	SPS	Brnabić II
Minister of Education
(17)	Branko Ružić	Branko Ružić (born 1975)	26 October 2022	29 May 2023	215 days	SPS	Brnabić III
–	Đorđe Milićević	Đorđe Milićević (born 1978); Acting	31 May 2023	25 July 2023	55 days	SPS	Brnabić III
18	Slavica Đukić Dejanović	Slavica Đukić Dejanović (born 1951)	25 July 2023	16 April 2025	1 year, 265 days	SPS	Brnabić III; Vučević
19	Dejan Vuk Stanković	Dejan Vuk Stanković (born 1973)	16 April 2025	Incumbent	1 year, 114 days	Independent	Macut

== See also ==
- Education in Serbia
