= Maja Popović =

Serbian lawyer and politician

- Маја Поповић
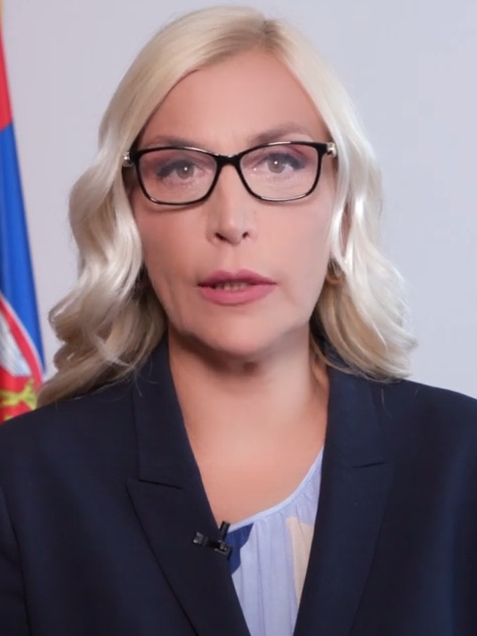
- Popović in 2022

Minister of Justice
- In office 28 October 2020 – 16 April 2025
- Prime Minister: Ana Brnabić; Ivica Dačić (acting); Miloš Vučević
- Preceded by: Nela Kuburović
- Succeeded by: Nenad Vujić

Personal details
- Born: 1972 (age 53–54) Belgrade, SR Serbia, SFR Yugoslavia
- Party: Independent
- Education: University of Belgrade; University of Novi Sad
- Profession: Lawyer

Maja Popović (Serbian Cyrillic: Маја Поповић; born 1972) is a Serbian lawyer and politician who served as minister of justice from 2020 to 2025. An independent politician, she was previously an advisor to Bratislav Gašić, the director of Security Intelligence Agency (BIA).

== Biography ==
=== Career ===
Maja Popović was born in 1972 in Belgrade which at that time was a part of the Socialist Federal Republic of Yugoslavia. She finished elementary school in her hometown, and high school in an international school in the Balearic Islands, Spain, where she was a student of the generation. Classes at this school were conducted in English and Spanish. In 1989, she enrolled at the Faculty of Law at the University of Belgrade and graduated within the age of 21. She passed the bar exam and defended her master's thesis at the Faculty of Law at the University of Novi Sad with an average grade of 9.80.

She started her law career in the office of lawyer Vesna Kušić. She then transferred to the District Court in Belgrade, where she worked as a trainee judge and judicial associate. At the age of 26, she became the youngest elected judge in the Federal Republic of Yugoslavia. She then started working as an investigating judge in the First Municipal Court in Belgrade. She later became a judge in the Civil Division of this court. From 2000 to 2012, she had her own law office and represented a variety of cases, from commercial and non-litigious disputes, through high-tech crime to organized crime.

In 2012, she became an assistant for non-medical affairs, director of the City Institute for Emergency Medical Aid in Belgrade. She held that position until 2014, when she became an employee of the Security Intelligence Agency (BIA). There she performed various tasks (international cooperation, human resources and housing issues). She was also the head of the Department for system-legal, normative, property-legal and housing relations. Then she was the head of the Cabinet of the Director Aleksandar Đorđević, and later she was a special advisor to the Director of the BIA Bratislav Gašić.

=== Minister of Justice ===
On 28 October 2020, she took office of the Minister of Justice in the Government of Serbia and the second cabinet of Ana Brnabić.

== Personal life ==
She is married and has two minor children. Her parents are lawyers Jevđo and Vesna Kušić, and her husband is Judge Rastko Popović. She is fluent in English, Italian, Spanish and French.
