= Branko Ružić (politician) =

Serbian politician (born 1975)

- Бранко Ружић
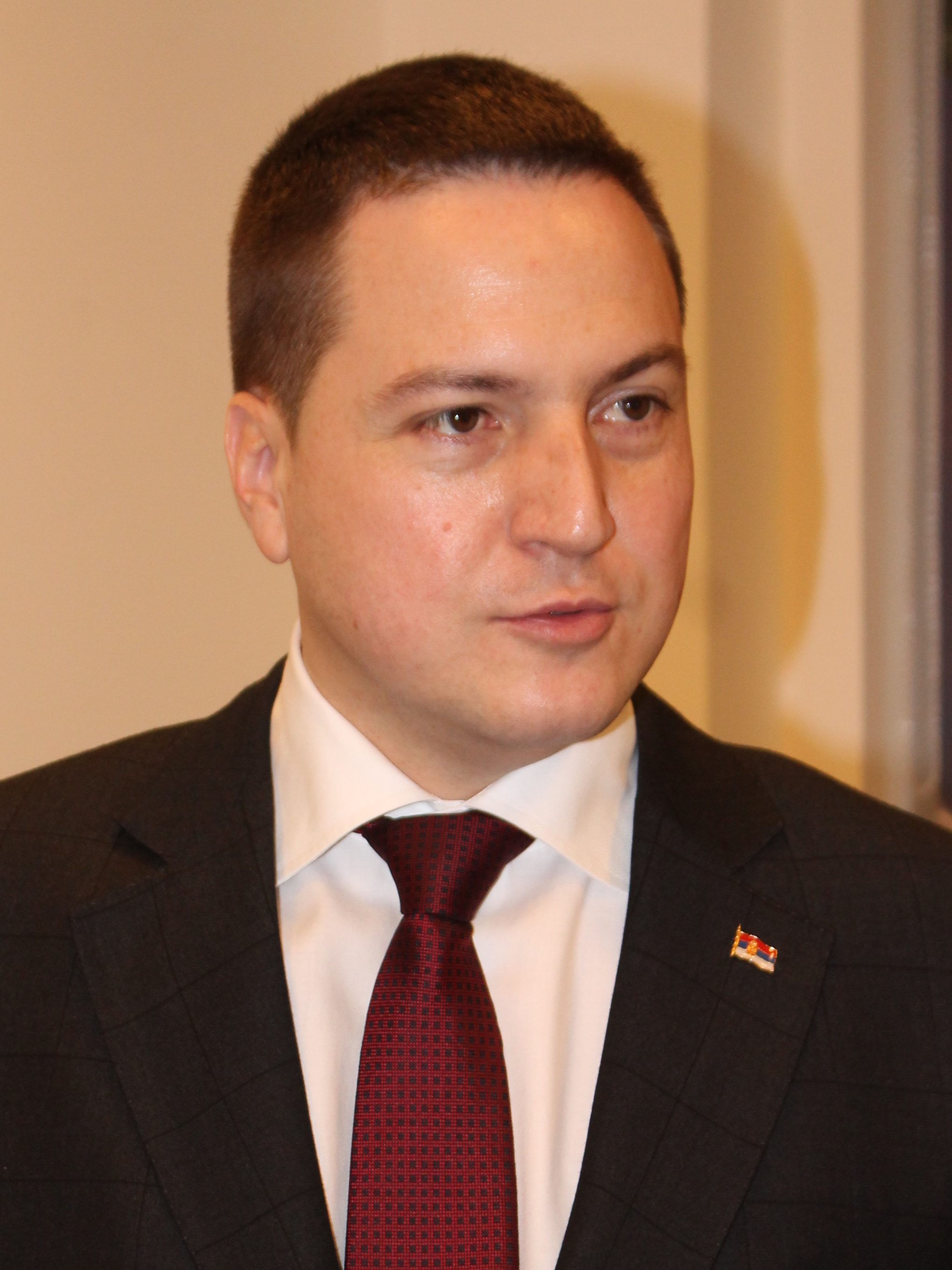
- Ružić in 2018

Minister of Education, Science and Technological Development
- In office 28 October 2020 – 29 May 2023
- Prime Minister: Ana Brnabić
- Preceded by: Mladen Šarčević
- Succeeded by: Đorđe Milićević (acting); Slavica Đukić Dejanović

First Deputy Prime Minister of Serbia
- In office 28 October 2020 – 26 October 2022
- Prime Minister: Ana Brnabić
- Preceded by: Ivica Dačić
- Succeeded by: Ivica Dačić

Minister of Public Administration and Local Self-Government
- In office 29 June 2017 – 28 October 2020
- Prime Minister: Ana Brnabić
- Preceded by: Ana Brnabić
- Succeeded by: Marija Obradović

Minister without portfolio in charge of European integration
- In office 2 September 2013 – 27 April 2014
- Prime Minister: Ivica Dačić
- Succeeded by: Jadranka Joksimović

Personal details
- Born: 14 December 1975 (age 50) Zemun, Belgrade, SR Serbia, SFR Yugoslavia
- Party: Red Line (2026–present)
- Other political affiliations: SPS (1996–2026)
- Spouse: Ana Ružić
- Children: 2
- Education: University of Belgrade
- Occupation: Politician

Branko Ružić (Serbian: Бранко Ружић; born 14 December 1975) is a Serbian politician who served as minister of education from 2020 to 2023 and as first deputy prime minister of Serbia from 2020 to 2022. He previously served as minister without portfolio in charge of European integration from 2013 to 2014 and as minister of public administration and local self-government from 2017 to 2020.

A former vice-president of the Socialist Party of Serbia (SPS), Ružić resigned as minister of education after the Belgrade school shooting in May 2023. After he joined a student-led anti-corruption protest in March 2025, SPS suspended him from all party functions, and it expelled him in August 2026. In November 2026, he launched an initiative to found a new social democratic party, Red Line – Social Democrats.

== Early life and education ==
Ružić was born on 14 December 1975 in Belgrade. He spent part of his childhood in Australia, where his father served as a diplomat. He graduated from the Faculty of Political Sciences of the University of Belgrade, where he was the student vice-dean from 1996 to 1999. He joined SPS while at university.

== Political career ==
=== Early career ===
Ružić was the president of the SPS youth wing from April 2000 to December 2002, and the party's spokesperson from March 2001 to December 2002. He was a member of the National Assembly of Serbia from January 2001 to December 2003, and of the Assembly of Serbia and Montenegro from 2004 to 2006.

From 2008 to 2013, Ružić led the SPS parliamentary group in the National Assembly. He was also a member of the National Assembly's permanent delegation to the Parliamentary Assembly of the Council of Europe, where he was a member of its political and human rights committees.

=== Minister ===
In September 2013, following a reshuffle of the cabinet of Ivica Dačić, Ružić was appointed minister without portfolio in charge of European integration, serving until the formation of the cabinet of Aleksandar Vučić on 27 April 2014.

After Vučić was elected president of Serbia in 2017, Ana Brnabić formed a new government on 29 June 2017, in which Ružić became minister of public administration and local self-government. In the second Brnabić cabinet, formed on 28 October 2020, he was appointed minister of education, science and technological development and first deputy prime minister. He was not reappointed first deputy prime minister in the third Brnabić cabinet in October 2022, but remained minister of education.

Following the Belgrade school shooting on 3 May 2023, Ružić was criticised for saying that "the cancerous, pernicious influence of Internet video games, so-called Western values, is evident". Opposition parties, the Youth Initiative for Human Rights and the Independent Union of Educators of Serbia called for his resignation. He resigned on 7 May, and the National Assembly confirmed his resignation on 29 May. He was then appointed an adviser to Dačić.

=== Break with SPS ===
On 15 March 2025, Ružić joined the large student-led protest in Belgrade, although he had voted with the SNS–SPS majority at the previous session of the National Assembly. On 4 April, the SPS statutory commission unanimously suspended him from all party functions for six months for a "serious violation" of the party statute, citing his "participation in demonstrations and a protest against the government of which SPS is a part"; as a result, he would not be a candidate for any post in the new government. Ružić said that he would respect the decision but appeal it.

On 5 April 2025, the pro-government tabloid Informer published an audio recording of Ružić speaking at a session of the SPS presidency shortly before his suspension. In the recording, he suggested that SPS could remain part of the ruling majority without entering the government, following the model of the Alliance of Vojvodina Hungarians. He also argued that SPS should call for a return to schools and universities and for de-escalation rather than labelling or attacking the students, who as new voters could win "15–20 per cent", adding: "Let's take a bite of them too (daj da štrbnemo i od njih nešto), if we're smart." Ružić called the leak a "miserable move" and asked the party to establish who had made it, saying that by "štrbnuti" he had meant winning the trust of young voters.

Ružić continued to criticise the government and the SPS leadership, and repeatedly called on SPS to pursue an independent policy rather than become part of the Serbian Progressive Party (SNS). On 31 August 2026, the statutory commission expelled him from SPS for a serious violation of the party statute.

=== Red Line – Social Democrats ===
In October 2026, ahead of the parliamentary election, Ružić announced that he would begin registering a new party in November, saying that his aim was not to "reconstruct or create a new SPS", and that he would not vote for the lists of Vučić or Dačić. Ivan Đoković, a former vice-president of the SPS provincial board in Vojvodina, left SPS to join the initiative, calling Ružić's expulsion "the straw that broke the camel's back".

On 9 November 2026, Ružić launched an initiative to found Red Line – Social Democrats (Crvena linija – socijaldemokrate) and called on citizens to support its registration with their signatures. He described it as a party with a "clear social democratic orientation" and a European perspective, based on the principles of dignity, solidarity and justice, which he called "our red line".

== Political positions ==
Earlier in his career, Ružić was a staunch defender of Slobodan Milošević. Since 2025, he has supported the student-led protests, saying that he had spoken publicly for two years about their struggle for the "recovery of Serbia". His new party advocates strong public health care and education, workers' rights, social security and European values.

== Personal life ==
Ružić and his wife Ana have two children, a son, Milutin, and a daughter, Elena.

Political offices
Preceded by	Minister without portfolio in charge of European integration 2013–2014	Succeeded by Jadranka Joksimović
Preceded by Ana Brnabić	Minister of Public Administration and Local Self-Government; 2017–2020	Succeeded by Marija Obradović
Preceded by Ivica Dačić	First Deputy Prime Minister of Serbia; 2020–2022	Succeeded by Ivica Dačić
Preceded by Mladen Šarčević	Minister of Education, Science and Technological Development; 2020–2023	Succeeded by Slavica Đukić Dejanović
