= Snežana Petrović (Serbian People's Party politician) =

Serbian politician

Snežana R. Petrović (Serbian Cyrillic: Снежана Р. Петровић; born 8 December 1965) is a politician in Serbia. She has served in the National Assembly of Serbia since 2016 as a member of the Serbian People's Party (Srpska narodna partija, SNP).

== Early life and career ==
Petrović was born in Kosjerić, in what was then the Socialist Republic of Serbia in the Socialist Federal Republic of Yugoslavia. She has a bachelor's degree in economics. Petrović worked in the Užice branch of the Vojvođanska banka from 1989 to 2005 and at the Raiffeisen Bank in the same city from 2005 to 2007. She also began working for NIS Gazprom Neft in 2005, eventually becoming the head of wholesale service. She lives in Užice.

== Politician ==
=== Municipal politics ===
Petrović entered political life as a member of the Democratic Party of Serbia (Demokratska stranka Srbije, DSS), receiving the twelfth position on the party's electoral list for the Užice city assembly in the 2004 Serbian local elections. The list won seven mandates and she was not included in her party's assembly delegation. (From 2000 to 2011, mandates in Serbian elections were awarded at the discretion of successful parties or coalitions, and it was common practice for the mandates to be assigned out of numerical order. Petrović's position on the list had no specific bearing on her election.)

She was given the nineteenth position on a coalition election list led by the DSS in the 2008 Serbian local elections. and was this time included in her party's delegation when the list won seventeen mandates. She did not seek re-election in 2012.

In 2011, Serbia's electoral system was reformed so that mandates were awarded to candidates on successful lists in numerical order. The DSS split in 2015, with several dissident members forming the Serbian People's Party.

=== Parliamentarian ===
The Serbian People's Party contested the 2016 Serbian parliamentary election as part of the Aleksandar Vučić – Serbia Is Winning electoral alliance led by the Serbian Progressive Party. Petrović received the eighty-sixth position on the alliance's electoral list and was elected when the list a won a landslide victory with 131 out of 250 mandates. Three SNP candidates won mandates in this election, and all served in the Progressive Party's parliamentary group.

During the 2016–20 parliament, Petrović was a member of the committee on the economy, regional development, trade, tourism, and energy; a deputy member of the committee on human and minority rights and gender equality and the committee on finance, state budget, and control of public spending; and a member of the parliamentary friendship groups with Belarus, Bolivia, Brazil, Bulgaria, China, India, Kazakhstan, Russia, and the United States of America.

Petrović received the 127th position on the Progressive Party's Aleksandar Vučić — For Our Children coalition list in the 2020 Serbian parliamentary election and was elected to a second term when the list won a landslide majority with 188 mandates. She is still a member of the economy committee and is a deputy member of the finance committee as well as the committee on spatial planning, transport, infrastructure, and telecommunications. Petrović is also a member of the parliamentary friendship groups with Brazil, Egypt, Finland, Israel, India, Kuwait, Portugal, Russia, Spain, Turkey, and the United Arab Emirates.
