= Minister without portfolio (Serbia) =

Minister of the Government of Serbia

- Министар без портфеља Ministar bez portfelja
- Incumbent; Novica Tončev, Đorđe Milićević, Usame Zukorlić, Nenad Popović, and Tatjana Macura since 28 October 2020 (Tončev); 26 October 2022 (Milićević); 2 May 2024 (Zukorlić); 2 May 2024 (Popović); 2 May 2024 (Macura)
- Nominator: Prime Minister
- Appointer: National Assembly
- Inaugural holder: Mihalj Kertes
- Formation: 14 July 1993
- Website: srbija.gov.rs

Minister without portfolio (Serbian: Министар без портфеља, romanized: Ministar bez portfelja) is a minister in the Government of Serbia with no particular ministry but who has some specific responsibilities.

The office is usually held simultaneously by several people at the same time (in the second cabinet of Mirko Marjanović there were ten ministers without portfolio at one point).

The current ministers without portfolio, by date of assuming office, are: Novica Tončev (since 28 October 2020), Đorđe Milićević (since 26 October 2022), Usame Zukorlić (since 2 May 2024), Nenad Popović (since 2 May 2024), and Tatjana Macura (since 2 May 2024).

== List of ministers ==
Political parties: SPS SRS n-p DS SDA PS NS SNS PUPS SNP SPP

| Name (Birth–Death) | Party | Term of office | | Charge | Prime Minister (Cabinet) |
|---|---|---|---|---|---|
| Mihalj Kertes (1947–2022) | SPS | 14 July 1993 | 18 March 1994 | | Šainović (I) |
| Vekoslav Šošević (born 1948) | SPS | 18 March 1994 | 28 May 1996 | | Marjanović (I) |
| Dragan Tomić (born 1937) | SPS | 18 March 1994 | 24 March 1998 | | Marjanović (I) |
| Andreja Milosavljević (born 1936) | SPS | 18 March 1994 | 24 March 1998 | | Marjanović (I) |
| Milun Babić (born 1950) | SPS | 18 March 1994 | 24 March 1998 | | Marjanović (I) |
| Ratomir Vico (1941–2005) | SPS | 28 May 1996 | 24 March 1998 | | Marjanović (I) |
| Dejan Kovačević (1937–2021) | SPS | 11 February 1997 | 24 March 1998 | | Marjanović (I • II) |
| Ivan Sedlak (1951–2020) | SPS | 11 February 1997 | 24 October 2000 | | Marjanović (I • II) |
| Đura Lazić (born 1953) | SPS | 11 February 1997 | 24 October 2000 | | Marjanović (I • II) |
| Milan Beko (born 1961) | n-p | 24 March 1998 | 1 July 1998 | | Marjanović (II) |
| Maja Gojković (born 1963) | SRS | 24 March 1998 | 11 November 1999 | | Marjanović (II) |
| Slobodan Tomović (born 1946) | SPS | 24 March 1998 | 11 November 1999 | | Marjanović (II) |
| Čedomir Vasiljević (born 1947) | SRS | 24 March 1998 | 24 October 2000 | | Marjanović (II) |
| Paja Momčilov (born 1948) | SRS | 24 March 1998 | 24 October 2000 | | Marjanović (II) |
| Bogoljub Karić (born 1954) | n-p | 20 October 1998 | 11 November 1999 | | Marjanović (II) |
| Života Ćosić (born 1942) | SPS | 11 November 1999 | 24 October 2000 | | Marjanović (II) |
| Božidar Vučurević (born 1951) | SRS | 11 November 1999 | 24 October 2000 | | Marjanović (II) |
| Jovan Damjanović (born 1947) | SRS | 11 November 1999 | 24 October 2000 | | Marjanović (II) |
| Dragan Đilas (born 1967) | DS | 15 May 2007 | 7 July 2008 | National Investment Plan | Koštunica (II) |
| Sulejman Ugljanin (born 1953) | SDA | 7 July 2008 | 27 April 2014 | Sustainable development | Cvetković (I); Dačić (I) |
| Aleksandar Vulin (born 1972) | PS | 2 September 2013 | 27 April 2014 | Kosovo and Metohija | Dačić (I) |
| Branko Ružić (born 1975) | SPS | 2 September 2013 | 27 April 2014 | European integration | Dačić (I) |
| Velimir Ilić (born 1951) | NS | 27 April 2014 | 11 August 2016 | Emergency situations | Vučić (I) |
| Jadranka Joksimović (born 1978) | SNS | 27 April 2014 | 29 June 2017 | European integration | Vučić (I • II) |
| Slavica Đukić Dejanović (born 1951) | SPS | 11 August 2016 | 28 October 2020 | Demography and population policy | Vučić (II); Brnabić (I) |
| Milan Krkobabić (born 1952) | PUPS | 11 August 2016 | 28 October 2020 | Regional development and coordination of state-owned companies | Vučić (II); Brnabić (I) |
| Nenad Popović (born 1966) | SNP | 29 June 2017 | 26 October 2022 | Innovations and technological development | Brnabić (I • II) |
| Novica Tončev (born 1962) | SPS | 28 October 2020 | Present | Development of underdeveloped municipalities | Brnabić (II • III); Vučević (I); Macut (I) |
| Đorđe Milićević (born 1978) | SPS | 26 October 2022 | Present | Coordination of activities and measures in the field of relations between Serbia and its diaspora | Brnabić (III); Vučević (I); Macut (I) |
| Edin Đerlek (born 1987) | SPP | 26 October 2022 | 2 May 2024 | Balanced regional development | Brnabić (III) |
| Usame Zukorlić (born 1992) | SPP | 2 May 2024 | Present | Reconciliation, regional cooperation, and social stability | Vučević (I); Macut (I) |
| Nenad Popović (born 1966) | SNP | 2 May 2024 | Present | International economic cooperation, and the social position of the Serbian Orthodox Church at home and abroad | Vučević (I); Macut (I) |
| Tatjana Macura (born 1981) | n-p | 2 May 2024 | Present | Gender equality, prevention of violence against women, and economic and political empowerment of women | Vučević (I); Macut (I) |

== See also ==
- Government of Serbia
