= Dejan Vuk Stanković =

Serbian academic (born 1973)

- Дејан Вук Станковић
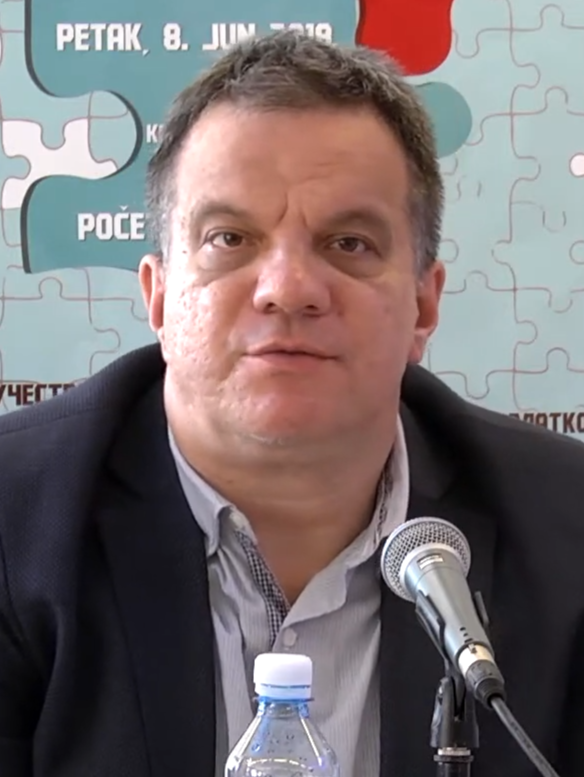
- Stanković in 2018

Minister of Education
- Incumbent
- Assumed office 16 April 2025
- Prime Minister: Đuro Macut
- Preceded by: Slavica Đukić Dejanović

Personal details
- Born: 22 January 1973 (age 53) Belgrade, SFR Yugoslavia
- Party: Independent
- Other political affiliations: Movement for the People and the State
- Education: University of Belgrade
- Occupation: Academic
- Profession: Philosopher

Dejan Vuk Stanković (Serbian: Дејан Вук Станковић; born 22 January 1973) is a Serbian university professor and political analyst who has served as the minister of education of Serbia since 2025. Although not affiliated with any political party, he is a member of the Movement for the People and the State, founded by President of Serbia Aleksandar Vučić.

Born in Belgrade, he graduated from the Faculty of Philosophy of the University of Belgrade in 1998, where he later obtained a doctorate. He has worked at the Faculty of Teacher Education of the University of Belgrade since 2003. He has worked as a researcher, columnist, and political analyst for pro-government television channels. Stanković has opposed the student-led anti-corruption protests in Serbia. As Minister for Education, he has worked on amending the Law on Higher Education and Law on Textbooks, and creating the Faculty of Serbian Studies in Niš. His nomination as minister received opposition from those supportive of the student-led protests.

== Early life and career ==
Stanković was born on 22 January 1973 in Belgrade, SR Serbia, SFR Yugoslavia, and attended First Belgrade Gymnasium. He later graduated from the Faculty of Philosophy of the University of Belgrade in 1998 with a degree in philosophy, from which he would receive his doctorate in 2011. He began working at the Faculty of Teacher Education of the University of Belgrade in 2003.

Besides his academic career, Stanković has also worked as a researcher in opinion polling, initially for Marten Board International and then for Faktor Plus. He is a columnist for the tabloid Kurir and the newspaper Politika, and a political analyst, regularly appearing on pro-government television channels such as Pink, Prva Srpska Televizija, and Informer. He is not affiliated with any political party.

After the Novi Sad railway station canopy collapse on 1 November 2024, student-led anti-corruption protests began in Serbia. Stanković has opposed the protests, accusing the students of trying to remove the Serbian government. When the Faculty of Teacher Education voted to support the students blockading the institution, Stanković was reportedly the only one to oppose.

== Minister of Education ==
Đuro Macut's cabinet was announced on 14 April 2025, with Stanković nominated for the role of minister of education. His nomination was opposed by students and professors supportive of the anti-corruption protests. The student plenary assembly and professors of the Faculty of Teacher Education, and the Independent Union of Educational Workers in Serbia, also condemned his nomination due to his alleged unprofessionalism. Stanković was elected minister of education on 16 April, succeeding Slavica Đukić Dejanović.

=== Tenure ===
==== 2025 ====
Shortly after he assumed office, a protest was staged in front of the building of the Ministry of Education by professors who opposed his nomination . Stanković stated that he would work to resolve the crisis started by the anti-corruption protests, which he described as "the greatest educational crisis in the history of Serbia". The dean of the Faculty of Agriculture, Vladan Bogdanović, said that any aggressive attempts to end the protests would most likely lead to a conflict within the University of Belgrade staff. When Macut initiated meetings with Vladan Đokić, the rector of the University of Belgrade, to solve the crisis, Stanković attended the first meeting. Stanković later accused Đokić of trying to destroy Serbia.

In May, Macut's government created a working group inside Stanković's ministry that would work on amending the Law on Higher Education. Besides Stanković, members of the working group included Đokić, Minister of Science Béla Bálint, and University of Novi Sad rector Dejan Madić. In the same month, Stanković proposed changes to the Law on Textbooks, describing them as "preserving national identity" and based on "respect for our mother tongue and nurturing tradition". These changes were approved by the National Assembly of Serbia in December 2025. Stanković also joined the Movement for the People and the State, initiated by President Aleksandar Vučić.

Regarding the enrolment of new students, Stanković announced that quotas would be only given to faculties who resume classes. Most faculties had resumed classes by July; however, the buildings remained occupied by students. In August, Stanković announced that wages in education would be increased in line with the average monthly salary. At the start of a new school year in September, more than 100 teachers across Serbia were fired. In the same month, Stanković's ministry gave 11 humanoid robots to schools with inclusive education resource centres. In October, Stanković announced that the academic year would begin in November instead of October. He also proposed the creation of a Faculty of Serbian Studies in Niš. A month later, he proposed the creation of a new law on universities, giving the Serbian government greater influence over management.

==== 2026 ====
In January 2026, the wages of education workers were increased by 5.1%. In the same month, he visited the State University of Novi Pazar with minister Husein Memić, meeting rector Tanja Soldatović. Stanković suggested that school lessons should be shortened to 30 minutes, from 45 minutes, citing reduced attention span amongst children. At a government session on 25 January, he announced that his ministry has drafted four new laws to reform education. Former rector of the University of Belgrade, Ivanka Popović, stated her opposition to the changes. In March, he announced further reforms of primary education; he also said that Serbia will adopt the Code for the Application of Artificial Intelligence in Education.

In February, Danka Nešović, whose mandate as the director of the Fifth Belgrade Gymnasium expired that month, was appointed as an advisor to Stanković for six months, which was opposed by the opposition. Shortly before her term ended, Nešović suspended six professors from the Gymnasium. The Extended Rectors' College of the University of Belgrade opposed the suspensions and blamed Stanković for the decision. In late March, the Faculty of Serbian Studies received a permit to operate.

== Personal life ==
During his tenure at the Faculty of Teacher Education, he was accused by female students of sexual harassment and unprofessionalism. According to the Ministry of Internal Affairs, no sexual harassment complaints were filed against Stanković. Shortly before he became a government minister, he filed a criminal complaint against anonymous individuals who accused him of sexual harassment.

In May 2025, a group of professors of University of Belgrade accused Stanković of autoplagiarism and filed an official report against him. The report was dismissed in July. However, in December, it was announced that the Ethical Committee of the Faculty of Teacher Education would review the accusations.
