= Ognjen Pantović =

Serbian politician

Ognjen Pantović (Serbian Cyrillic: Огњен Пантовић; born July 16, 1989) is a politician in Serbia. He served in the National Assembly of Serbia from 2016 to 2020 as a member of the Serbian People's Party.

== Early life and private career ==
Pantović was born in Sarajevo in what was then the Socialist Republic of Bosnia and Herzegovina in the Socialist Federal Republic of Yugoslavia. He subsequently moved to Belgrade and was educated in the city. He has a bachelor's degree (2012) and a master's degree (2013) from the University of Belgrade Faculty of Civil Engineering and works as an engineer in the field of public transport.

== Political career ==
Pantović is a member of the city committee of the Serbian People's Party in Belgrade and the party's secretary for the Palilula municipality.

The Serbian People's Party contested the 2016 parliamentary election on the Serbian Progressive Party's Aleksandar Vučić – Serbia Is Winning electoral list. Pantović received the 127th position and was elected when the list won 131 mandates. He was a member of the assembly's agriculture forestry and water management committee; a member of the committee on spatial planning, transport, infrastructure, and telecommunications; and a member of the parliamentary friendship groups with Belarus, China, Germany, Israel, Romania, Russia, and South Africa. Following his election, he announced that he would ride a bicycle to work as a gesture toward environmental sustainability.

In late 2016, Pantović and other members of the Serbian People's Party called for Serbs with the right to vote in Srebrenica's municipal election to support the candidacy of Mladen Grujičić. Pantović, who described himself as a survivor of the Bosnian War, stated that he rejected the contention that Serb forces committed genocide in the city and accused Naser Orić's forces of having committed the greatest crimes in the region during the conflict.
