= Marija Obradović (politician) =

Serbian politician (born 1974)

- Марија Обрадовић
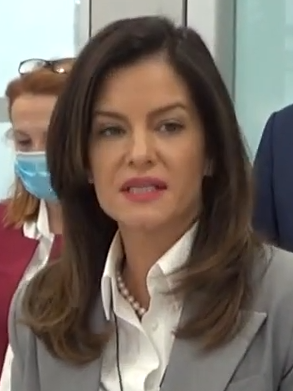
- Obradović in 2020

Minister of Public Administration and Local Self-Government of Serbia
- In office 28 October 2020 – 26 October 2022
- Prime Minister: Ana Brnabić
- Preceded by: Branko Ružić
- Succeeded by: Aleksandar Martinović

Vice President of the Parliamentary Assembly of the Council of Europe
- In office 9 October 2017 – 20 January 2019
- President: Michele Nicoletti; Liliane Maury Pasquier

Personal details
- Born: 24 June 1974 (age 52) Kraljevo, SR Serbia, SFR Yugoslavia
- Party: SNS (2008–present)
- Profession: Journalist

Marija Obradović (Serbian Cyrillic: Марија Обрадовић; born 24 June 1974) is a Serbian politician who served as minister of public administration and local self-government from 2020 to 2022. A member of the Serbian Progressive Party (SNS), she previously served as vice president of the Parliamentary Assembly of the Council of Europe (PACE) from 2017 to 2019.

== Early life and career ==
Obradović was born and raised in Kraljevo, in what was then the Socialist Republic of Serbia in the Socialist Federal Republic of Yugoslavia. She attended the pedagogical academy in Kruševac, the University of Belgrade Teacher Education Faculty, and the diplomatic academy of the Serbian ministry of foreign affairs. She was a journalist at Radio Television Kruševac from 1991 to 1994 and subsequently worked for JP "Ibarske novosti" and Radio Television of Serbia in Kraljevo from 1994 to 2008, serving in the latter capacity as editor of the program Danas ("Today"). She now lives in Belgrade.

== Politician ==
=== Parliamentarian ===
Obradović worked for the Progressive Party's information service from 2008 to 2012. She received the thirty-sixth position on the party's Let's Get Serbia Moving electoral list in the 2012 Serbian parliamentary election and was elected when the list won seventy-three mandates. The Progressive Party formed a new coalition government with the Socialist Party of Serbia and other parties after the election, and Obradović served as part of its parliamentary majority. She was a member of Serbia's delegation to the Inter-Parliamentary Union Assembly and a founder and coordinator of the Women's Parliamentary Network during this time, as well as serving on the assembly's foreign affairs committee.

She was promoted to the twelfth position on the Progressive Party's Aleksandar Vučić — Future We Believe In list for the 2014 parliamentary election and was re-elected when the list won a landslide victory with 158 out of 250 mandates. In this parliament, she chaired of the defence and internal affairs committee, became a member of Serbia's delegation to the Parliamentary Assembly of the Council of Europe (PACE), and continued to serve on the foreign affairs committee and coordinate the Women's Parliamentary Network. In December 2014, she took part in a conference of prominent women from Belgrade and Priština, held in the Serbian capital. She rejected the possibility of Serbia joining the North Atlantic Treaty Organization (NATO) in 2016, affirming the country's policy of neutrality.

In January 2016, Obradović indicated that she was open the possibility of becoming Serbia's new defence minister in an upcoming cabinet shuffle. She was not, on this occasion, appointed to the position.

Obradović appeared in the fifteenth position on the Progressive Party's electoral list for the 2016 parliamentary election and was elected to a third term when the list won a second consecutive majority with 131 mandates. She continued to chair the defence and internal affairs committee and was a member of the foreign affairs committee and the security services control committee; a deputy member of the culture and information committee; a deputy member of the European Union–Serbia stabilization and association parliamentary committee; and a member of Serbia's parliamentary friendship groups with Armenia, Canada, China, Germany, India, Qatar, Russia, and the United States of America.

Obradović was a member of Serbia's delegation to the Parliamentary Assembly of the Council of Europe until 2020, sitting with the European People's Party group. She led Serbia's delegation from 7 October to 23 November 2017 and was a vice-president of the assembly from 2017 to 2019. She was a full member of the PACE committee on culture, science, education, and media from 2014 to 2017 and the committee on legal affairs and human rights from 2014 to 2020. She was also an alternate member of the committee on political affairs and democracy from 2015 to 2020 (except for October to November 2017, when she was a full member) and the committee on equality and non-discrimination from 2014 to 2017, as well as serving as an alternative member of the sub-committee on external relations from 2015 to 2017 and a full member from 2017 to 2018.

She appeared in the fourteenth position on the Progressive Party's list for the 2020 parliamentary committee and was elected to a fourth term when the list won a landslide victory. She resigned from the assembly on being appointed to cabinet. Obradović served as the vice president of SNS until 2021.

=== Cabinet minister ===
Obradović was appointed to cabinet on 28 October 2020 as minister of public administration and local self-government.

Political offices
Preceded by Branko Ružić	Minister of Public Administration and Local Self-Government; 2020–2022	Succeeded by Aleksandar Martinović
