= Jadranka Joksimović =

Serbian politician

- Јадранка Јоксимовић
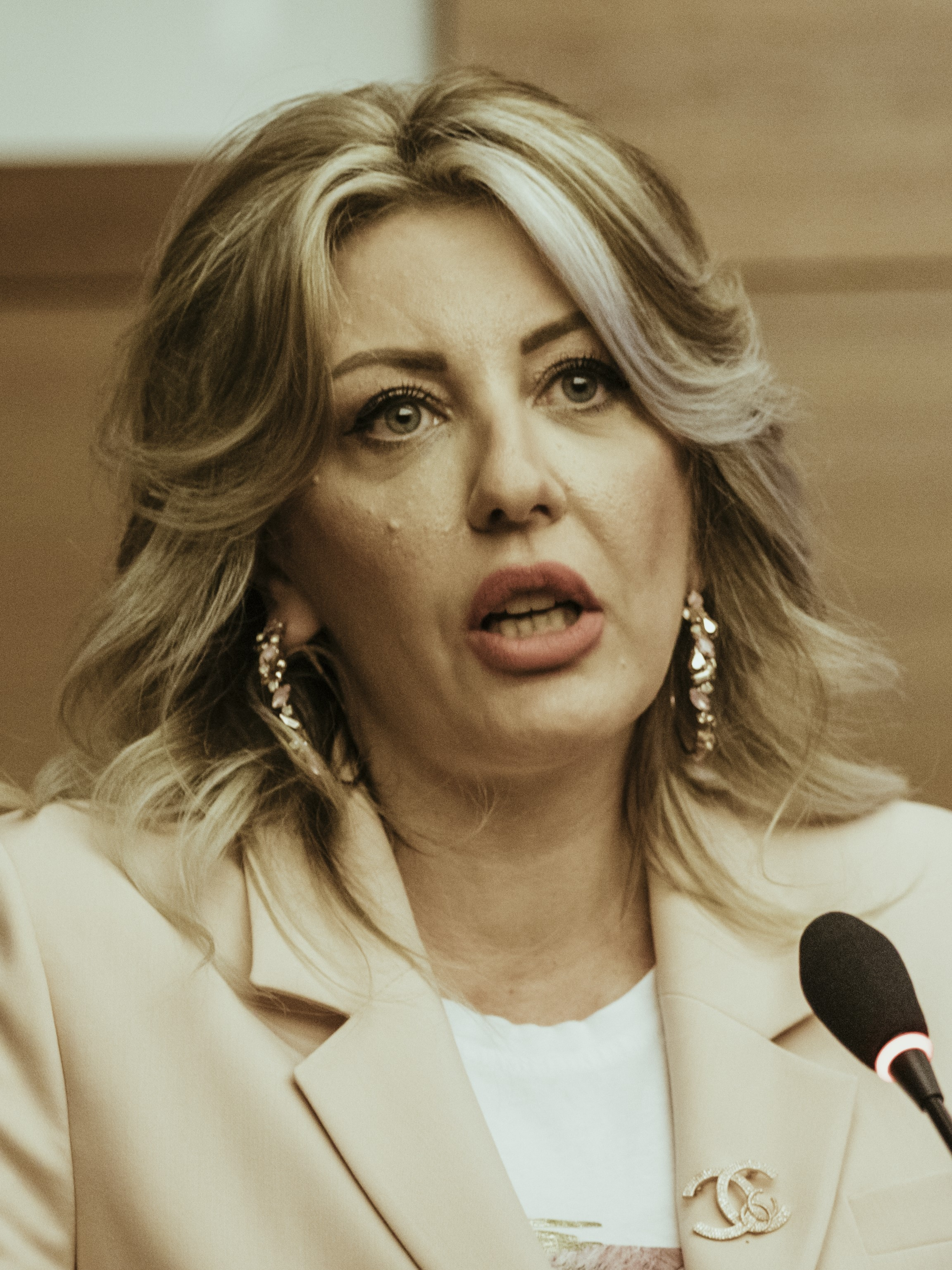
- Joksimović in 2021

Minister of European Integration
- In office 29 June 2017 – 26 October 2022
- Prime Minister: Ana Brnabić
- Preceded by: Position established
- Succeeded by: Tanja Miščević

Minister without portfolio in charge of European Integration
- In office 27 April 2014 – 29 June 2017
- Prime Minister: Aleksandar Vučić
- Preceded by: Branko Ružić
- Succeeded by: Position disestablished

Personal details
- Born: 26 January 1978 (age 48) Belgrade, SR Serbia, SFR Yugoslavia
- Party: SRS (2006–2008); SNS (2008–present)
- Education: University of Belgrade
- Occupation: Politician

Jadranka Joksimović (Serbian Cyrillic: Јадранка Јоксимовић; born 26 January 1978) is a Serbian politician who served as minister of European Integration from 2017 to 2022. A member of the Serbian Progressive Party (SNS), she previously served as minister without portfolio in charge of European Integration from 2014 to 2017.

== Early life and education ==
Jadranka Joksimović was born on 26 January 1978 in Belgrade, where she finished primary and secondary school.

She graduated at the top of her class from the Faculty of Political Sciences, University of Belgrade, in academic year 2001/2002, at the Department of International Relations. She completed her Master's studies at the Faculty of Economy and Political Sciences, ALFA University in Belgrade, in 2013. She is currently pursuing doctoral studies in political science at the Faculty of Political Sciences, University of Belgrade.

She received The Promising Generation scholarship of the Embassy of the Kingdom of Norway in 2001, as well as the scholarship of the Fund for Young Talents of the Government of the Republic of Serbia For the most talented students in Serbia in 2000/2001. She began her career as a Demonstrator at the Faculty of Political Sciences for the courses of Diplomacy and Diplomatic History and Economy of Transition.

== Political career ==
=== Serbian Radical and Serbian Progressive parties ===
She became the member of the Serbian Radical Party in 2006 and worked there as an associate of Aleksandar Vučić for international relations. At the same time, she was part of the editorial staff of the party's magazine "Velika Srbija" (Great Serbia). She was also on the MP list for the 2008 parliamentary elections.

She was one of the signatories and founders of the Serbian Progressive Party in 2008. She is a member of the Main Committee and the Presidency of the Serbian Progressive Party. By decision of the president of the party, she was appointed International Secretary of the Serbian Progressive Party.

=== Representative and ministerial work ===
From 2007 to mid-2009, she worked at the National Assembly of the Republic of Serbia as an expert associate of parliamentary group Napred Srbijo (eng. Go forth, Serbia). From 2009 to 2012, she was the editor of municipal newsletter Zemunske novine (eng. Zemun newspaper).

In May 2012 Parliamentary elections, she was elected Member of Parliament in the National Assembly of the Republic of Serbia from the Serbian Progressive Party list. In the National Assembly, she was president of the Security Services Control Committee.

She was also a member of the European Integration Committee, member of the Joint Committee for Stabilisation and Association, member of the Permanent Delegation to the Parliamentary Assembly of the Council of Europe, Head of the delegation of the Central European Initiative, and president of the Friendship Group with Turkey.

She was first appointed Minister without portfolio in charge of European integration in the Government of the Republic of Serbia on 27 April 2014. As a Minister, in September 2015 she sent a letter of support to the organisers of the Pride parade in Belgrade. For that, she received "Duga" award (Rainbow award) on 15 May 2015 in Belgrade from Gay-straight Alliance.

Following the early parliamentary elections, on 11 August 2016, she was reappointed Minister without portfolio in charge of European integration. She was appointed Minister of European Integration in the Government of the Republic of Serbia on 29 June 2017.

During the meeting of senior Southeast European politicians in Slovenia on 25 April 2018, she refused to speak to Croatian reporters and instead chose to talk to the reporters she had brought along with her. Croatian Journalists Association condemned this action.

During the affair about importing children picture book containing same sex couples from Croatia in May 2018, she actively defended the homophobic statement of Minister Nenad Popović who said on his Twitter account: "We have to get in the way of those who want to convince us that it's okay that "Roko has two moms and Ana two dad".

== Private life ==
She is a proficient English speaker and has a good understanding of German as a listener. She has a brother Aleksandar Joksimović who is a businessman.

== Awards ==
- Award "Best European" for 2015 in the field of politics by First European House organisation.
- Award "Duga" (Rainbow) 2015 for the contribution to the struggle against homophobia.

Political offices
Preceded by Branko Ružić	Minister without portfolio of Serbia in charge of European integration 2014–2017	Succeeded by Nenad Popović (other charge)
Preceded by Position established	Minister of European Integration; 2017–present	Incumbent
