= Nenad Vujić =

Serbian politician (born 1966)

- Ненад Вујић

Minister of Justice
- Incumbent
- Assumed office 16 April 2025
- Prime Minister: Đuro Macut
- Preceded by: Maja Popović

Personal details
- Born: 26 October 1966 (age 59) Loznica, SR Serbia, Yugoslavia
- Party: Independent

Nenad Vujić (Serbian: Ненад Вујић; born 26 October 1966) is a Serbian politician serving as minister of justice since 2025. From 2010 to 2025, he served as director of the Judicial Academy.
