= Tatjana Macura =

Serbian politician (born 1981)

- Татјана Мацура
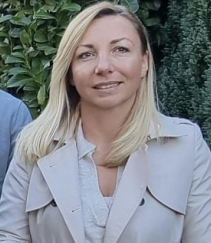
- Macura in 2023

Minister without portfolio
- Incumbent
- Assumed office 2 May 2024
- Prime Minister: Miloš Vučević; Đuro Macut

Personal details
- Born: 29 April 1981 (age 45)
- Party: Independent (2020–present)
- Other political affiliations: DJB (2014–2018); SMS (2018–2020)

Tatjana Macura (Serbian Cyrillic: Татјана Мацура; born 29 April 1981) is a Serbian politician and entrepreneur serving as minister without portfolio since 2024.

She served in the National Assembly of Serbia from 2016 to 2018, initially as a member of the anti-establishment and reformist It's Enough – Restart (Dosta je bilo, DJB) association, better known in English by the name "Enough Is Enough." On April 12, 2018, Macura announced her resignation from the association. She was part of a three-member presidency of the Party of Modern Serbia until 2020.

== Early life and career ==
Macura was born and raised in Zemun, Belgrade, then a part of the Socialist Republic of Serbia in the Socialist Federal Republic of Yugoslavia. She is a professional economist and entrepreneur, with experience in the telecommunications sector.

== Parliamentarian ==
Macura received the sixth position on the It's enough – Restart electoral list in the 2014 Serbian parliamentary election. The list did not cross the electoral threshold to win representation in the assembly.

She received the sixteenth position on the association's list for the 2016 election and was this time elected when the list won sixteen mandates. The election was won by the Serbian Progressive Party and its allies, and DJB served in opposition.

DJB founder Saša Radulović resigned as the association's president in early 2018. Macura announced on 2 April 2018 that she would seek to become his successor, running on a platform that opposed many the party's recent decisions. On 12 April, however, she both ended her leadership bid and announced her resignation from the association. One week later, she joined with four other former DJB delegates to announce the formation of the Free MPs parliamentary group, with herself as the group's leader.

All members of the Free MPs parliamentary group also joined a new political group called the Movement of the Center. In December 2018, this group merged with the Social Democratic Alliance to create the Party of Modern Serbia. Macura was chosen as an inaugural member of the group's three-member collective presidency.

Before leaving DJB, Macura was a member of the committee on human and minority rights and gender equality, the culture and information committee, and the committee on the rights of the child, and a deputy member of the committee on labour, social issues, social inclusion, and policy reduction. She is currently a member of Serbia's parliamentary friendship groups with Austria, Bosnia and Herzegovina, Croatia, Germany, and Montenegro.
