= Serbian People's Party (2014) =

Political party in Serbia

Serbian People's Party Српска народна партија
- Abbreviation: SNP
- President: Nenad Popović
- General Secretary: Jovan Palalić
- Founded: 21 September 2014; 12 years ago
- Split from: Democratic Party of Serbia
- Headquarters: Ustanička 65/5, Belgrade
- Ideology: National conservatism; Right-wing populism
- Political position: Right-wing
- Religion: Serbian Orthodox Church
- National affiliation: United Serbia
- European affiliation: Identity and Democracy Party (cooperation)
- International affiliation: For the Freedom of Nations!
- Colours: Red; Blue; Grey
- National Assembly: 0 / 250
- Assembly of Vojvodina: 0 / 120
- City Assembly of Belgrade: 1 / 110

Party flag

Website
- srpskanarodnapartija.rs

The Serbian People's Party (Serbian: Српска народна партија, romanized: Srpska narodna partija, abbr. SNP) is a right-wing populist and national-conservative political party in Serbia. It was formed in 2014 by former members of the Democratic Party of Serbia and is led by Nenad Popović, a minister without portfolio. Since 2016, it has run on the electoral lists led by the Serbian Progressive Party (SNS), most recently on "Aleksandar Vučić – United Serbia" in the 2026 parliamentary election.

== History ==
The SNP was founded in September 2014 in the village of Kriva Reka in the Zlatibor region. Its founding members included Popović, Jovan Palalić, Milan Stamatović (who left the party two years later), and the political philosopher Bogdana Koljević.

The party's first member of the assembly was Milan Petrić, who had been elected on the list of the Democratic Party in the 2014 election and joined the SNP in March 2015. The SNP subsequently contested the 2016 election on the SNS-led "Aleksandar Vučić – Serbia Is Winning" electoral list and elected three members to the assembly: Jovan Palalić, Ognjen Pantović, and Snežana Petrović.

Popović, who has led the SNP since its founding, was a minister without portfolio from 29 June 2017, in the first cabinet of Ana Brnabić, until 2022. On 16 November 2023, the United States Department of State imposed sanctions on Popović for operating in the electronics sector of the Russian economy, stating that he had used his Russia-based businesses to enrich himself and to gain close connections with senior Kremlin officials. In May 2024, he returned to the government as a minister without portfolio in the cabinet of Miloš Vučević, a post he retained in the cabinet of Đuro Macut formed in April 2025.

The SNP took part in the 2026 snap parliamentary election on the SNS-led "Aleksandar Vučić – United Serbia" list, which won 1,731,323 votes (39.48%) and 103 seats, losing the election to the Student List.

== Ideology and platform ==
SNP is a right-wing populist and a national-conservative party. On the political spectrum, it sits on the right-wing. Popović has advocated for a border fence on Serbia's border with North Macedonia to reduce illegal immigration. He has also opposed allowing LGBTQ content in children's books in Serbia.

=== Foreign policy ===
On foreign policy, the party typically favoured improved ties between Serbia and Russia, but it condemned the 2022 Russian invasion of Ukraine, describing it as a violation of Ukrainian territorial integrity. The party also opposes Serbian membership in the European Union if it requires concessions on Kosovo. Popović has expressed opposition to Catalonian independence, comparing the issue to Kosovo.

== Organisation ==
=== International affiliation and relations ===
SNP has cooperated with Identity and Democracy members, such as National Rally, the Freedom Party of Austria, Alternative for Germany, Vlaams Belang and Lega, as well as with other conservative parties such as Fidesz, Vox, the Slovenian Democratic Party, the U.S. Republican Party and the Bharatiya Janata Party.

== Electoral performance ==
=== Parliamentary elections ===
National Assembly
Year	Leader	Popular vote	% of popular vote	#	# of seats	Seat change	Coalition	Status	Ref.
2016	Nenad Popović	1,823,147	49.71%	▲1st	3 / 250	▲3	AV–SP	Support 2016–17	
2016	Nenad Popović	1,823,147	49.71%	▲1st	3 / 250	▲3	AV–SP	Government 2017–20	
2020	Nenad Popović	1,953,998	63.02%	1st	3 / 250	0	AV–ZND	Government	
2022	Nenad Popović	1,635,101	44.27%	1st	2 / 250	▼1	AV–ZMS	Support	
2023	Nenad Popović	1,783,701	48.07%	1st	2 / 250	0	AV–SNSDS	Government	
2026	Nenad Popović	1,731,323	39.48%	▼2nd	0 / 250	▼2	AV–US	Extra-parliamentary	

=== Presidential elections ===
President of Serbia
Year	Candidate	1st round popular vote		% of popular vote	2nd round popular vote		% of popular vote	Notes	Ref.
2017	Aleksandar Vučić	1st	2,012,788	56.01%	—N/a	—	—	Supported Vučić	
2022	Aleksandar Vučić	1st	2,224,914	60.01%	—N/a	—	—	Supported Vučić	
