= Usame Zukorlić =

Serbian politician (born 1992)

- Усаме Зукорлић
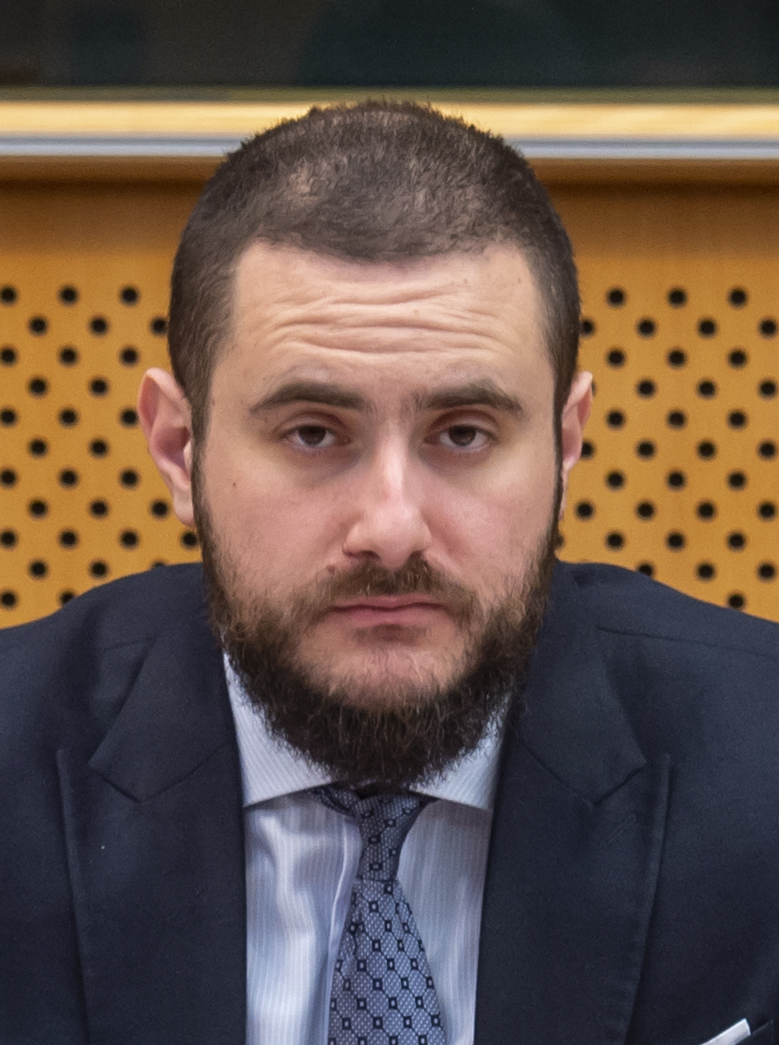
- Zukorlić in 2023

Minister without portfolio in charge of reconciliation, regional cooperation and social stability
- Incumbent
- Assumed office 2 May 2024
- Prime Minister: Miloš Vučević; Đuro Macut

Vice-President of the National Assembly of Serbia
- In office 2 August 2022 – 1 May 2024
- President: Vladimir Orlić

Member of the National Assembly
- In office 1 August 2022 – 1 May 2024

Personal details
- Born: 7 March 1992 (age 34) Constantine, Algeria
- Party: SPP
- Children: 4
- Parent: Muamer Zukorlić
- Education: International University; Faculty of Islamic Studies
- Occupation: Politician

Usame Zukorlić (Serbian Cyrillic: Усаме Зукорлић; born 7 March 1992) is a Serbian Bosniak politician and economist serving as minister without portfolio since 2024. He was previously a member of the National Assembly from 2022 to 2024. An ethnic Bosniak, he has been the president of the Justice and Reconciliation Party since 2021.

== Early life ==
Zukorlić was born in Constantine, Algeria in 1992. His father was Muamer Zukorlić, a Bosniak mufti and politician, while his mother, Umeja Abu Taha, was of mixed Palestinian and German origin. She was born in Brazil. He attended primary and secondary school in Novi Pazar, and later studied at the International University, where he obtained his master's degree in economics, and Faculty of Islamic Studies.

== Career ==
Zukorlić has been the member of the Justice and Reconciliation Party, previously known as Bosniak Democratic Union of Sandžak, since the early 2010s. He previously served as the head of the youth wing of the party. Following the death of his father in November 2021, Muamer Zukorlić, he was appointed as head of the party.

Shortly before he got elected as president of the Justice and Reconciliation Party, the National Assembly elected him as deputy president of the Republic Electoral Commission (RIK). Zukorlić was chosen as the ballot representative of his party for the 2022 general election. He had expressed his support to continue the cooperation between SPP and the Serbian Progressive Party, while during the electoral campaign, his party campaigned on education reforms and anti-discrimination politics. Following the election, he was elected as MP in the National Assembly. Zukorlić was elected vice-president of the National Assembly on 2 August.

== Personal life ==
Zukorlić was married in 2012 and the couple has four children. Besides his native Bosnian, he speaks English and Arabic. He had also worked as a teacher at the Gazi Isa-beg madrasa and was the deputy president of the Sandžak Television. He is the head of BioSan, IT San company, and Developmental Educational Society, which helped to establish the "Gazi Sinan-beg" youth center in Novi Pazar in 2017.

In 2015, it was alleged that Zukorlić conspired attacks against Đorđe Balašević. Zukorlić was later involved in an incident in 2018, after which he filed a complaint against two newspapers that allegedly published false claims about the incident.
