= Novica Tončev =

Serbian politician (born 1962)

- Новица Тончев
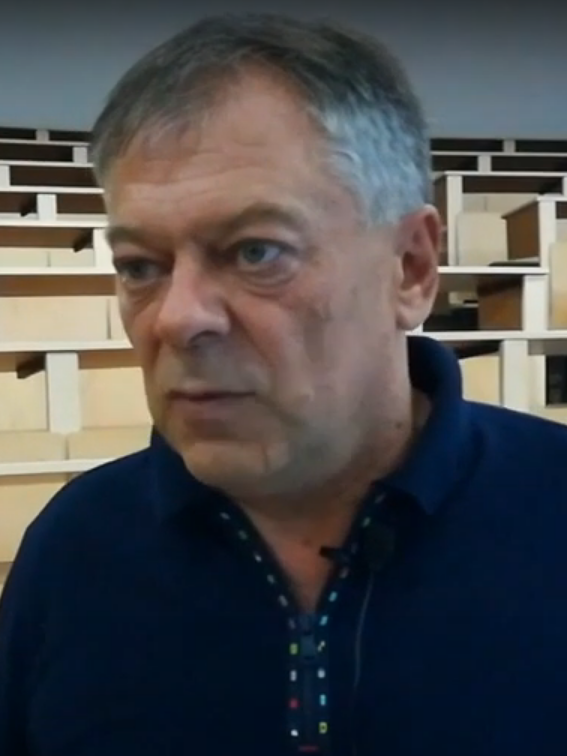
- Tončev in 2019

Minister without portfolio
- Incumbent
- Assumed office 28 October 2020
- Prime Minister: Ana Brnabić; Ivica Dačić (acting); Miloš Vučević; Đuro Macut
- Preceded by: Slavica Đukić Dejanović

Mayor of Surdulica
- In office 2008–2014
- Preceded by: Stanislav Momčilović
- Succeeded by: Aleksandar Popović

Personal details
- Born: 9 December 1962 (age 63) Niš, PR Serbia, FPR Yugoslavia
- Party: SPS
- Education: University of Niš
- Occupation: Politician

Novica Tončev (Serbian Cyrillic: Новица Тончев; born 9 December 1962) is a Serbian politician and businessman serving as minister without portfolio since 2020. A member of the Socialist Party of Serbia (SPS), he served as mayor of Surdulica from 2008 to 2014. He is the brother of Ivica Tončev, a prominent member of SPS and an advisor to party leader Ivica Dačić.

== Early life and career ==
Tončev was born in Niš, then part of the People's Republic of Serbia in the Federal People's Republic of Yugoslavia. He graduated from the University of Niš Faculty of Civil Engineering in 1989. He is the owner of the construction company Tončev Gradnja in Surdulica and the company Ton-Bau in Vienna, Austria, as well as being the co-owner Surdulica Radio-Television.

== Political career ==
Tončev was the president of the village of Božica from 1990 to 2000. He also joined the municipal assembly of Surdulica in 1996, was a member of the assembly's executive council from 1996 to 2000, and was its vice-president from 2000 to 2004. Following the 2008 local elections, he became the mayor of the municipality as the leader of a local citizen's group called "For Our Surdulica." The following year, he and several other members of the group joined the Socialist Party, which he led to a landslide victory in the 2012 local elections.

As mayor, Tončev supported a petition from the United Regions of Serbia party calling for the political decentralization of the country. In 2013, he proposed that an Italian company seeking to invest in the community be offered abandoned faculty buildings at a discounted price, on the condition that they provide a set number of jobs for the community in return. He resigned as mayor after being elected to the National Assembly, choosing to remain in local politics as president of the municipal assembly.

Tončev became a member of the Socialist Party's presidency in 2012. It was rumoured in 2013 that he was seeking an appointment as Serbia's transportation minister, though ultimately this appointment did not occur. In August 2013, he said that he had been offered the position but turned it down.

He received the twenty-second position on an electoral list led by the Socialist Party in the 2014 Serbian parliamentary election and was elected when the list won forty-four mandates. Surdulica was one of only two municipalities in Serbia where the Socialist list won the greatest number of votes. The election was won by the Serbian Progressive Party, which had previously been in a coalition government with the Socialists; following the announcement of the results, Tončev congratulated the Progressives on their victory and said that it would not be a problem for the Socialists to move into opposition in the next sitting of the assembly. His statement was quickly rebuked by the party leadership, and, following a new round of negotiations, the Socialists remained in government as a junior coalition partner. Rumours later circulated that Tončev had become aligned with a group of Socialists dissatisfied with Dačić's leadership. Notwithstanding this, he was selected in September 2015 as head of the party's 2016 local election campaign headquarters.

Tončev received the nineteenth position on the Socialist-led electoral list in the 2016 parliamentary election and was re-elected when the list won twenty-nine mandates. The election was again won by the Progressives, and the Socialists again remained as junior partners in a Progressive-led administration. Tončev continues to serve as a government supporter in the assembly.

He is currently a member of the assembly committee on the economy, regional development, trade, tourism, and energy; a member of the committee on spatial planning, transport, infrastructure, and telecommunications; the head of Serbia's parliamentary friendship group with Bulgaria (which borders Surdulica); and a member of the parliamentary friendship groups with Argentina, Cuba, Greece, Iraq, Italy, Kazakhstan, Macedonia, Montenegro, Russia, and Slovenia.

In May 2017, Tončev said that many Socialists were concerned that their party could lose its identity and become absorbed into the Progressive Party. The following month, he indicated that he was considering the possibility of resigning from the Socialist Party to start a new left-wing group that would support the rights of the working class. He later clarified that he had not made a decision on the matter and that there was still time for Dačić to preserve the Socialist Party. He ultimately remained with the Socialists and, in fact, was selected as a party vice-president in July 2017.

In November 2017, Tončev was convicted of having engaged in violent behaviour against a Progressive Party activist at a 2014 pre-election rally and sentenced to three months in prison. In launching an appeal, he protested his innocence, described the charge as politically motivated, and said that his accuser had in fact been responsible for a disturbance of the peace.
