= Nenad Popović =

Serbian politician and businessman

- Ненад Поповић
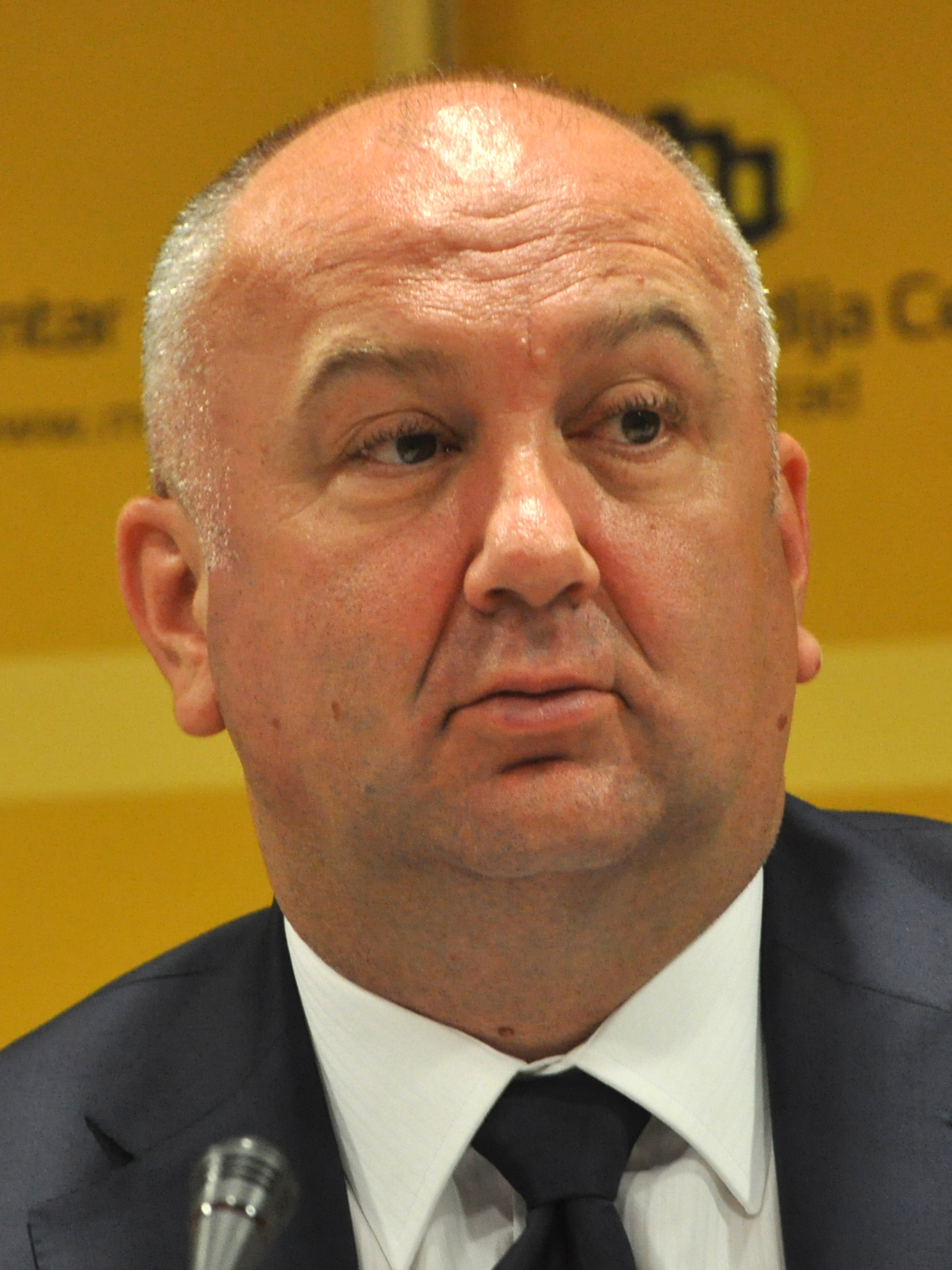
- Popović in 2015

Minister without portfolio
- Incumbent
- Assumed office 2 May 2024
- Prime Minister: Miloš Vučević; Đuro Macut
- In office 29 June 2017 – 26 October 2022
- Prime Minister: Ana Brnabić
- Preceded by: Jadranka Joksimović
- Succeeded by: Đorđe Milićević

Prezident of FK Partizan
- In office 26 December 2006 – 26 April 2007
- Preceded by: Ivan Ćurković
- Succeeded by: Tomislav Karadžić

Personal details
- Born: 30 September 1966 (age 60) Tuzla, SR Bosnia and Herzegovina, SFR Yugoslavia
- Party: DSS (until 2014); SNP (2014–present)
- Education: University of Belgrade; Moscow State University
- Occupation: Politician; businessman

Nenad Popović (Serbian Cyrillic: Ненад Поповић; born 30 September 1966) is a Serbian politician and businessman who served as minister without portfolio since 2024, previously serving that role from 2017 to 2022. A long-time member of the Democratic Party of Serbia (DSS), he left the party in 2014 and formed the Serbian People's Party (SNP).

== Biography ==
=== Early years and education ===
Popović was born in Tuzla, Bosnia and Herzegovina, on 30 September 1966, son of Nemanja Popović, university professor and academician of the Russian Academy of Natural Sciences, and of Danica, professor of history.

He graduated from the University of Belgrade Faculty of Machine Engineering. He finished his Master's and doctoral studies at Moscow State University's Faculty of Economics. He was a professor at the Faculty of Economy of Moscow's Lomonosov University and the Faculty of Economics of the Moscow State Mining University.

=== Political career ===
From 2006 to 2008 he was the head of the economic team for Kosovo and Metohija. He led the development of the Strategy for Long-Term Economic Development of Serbian Communities in Kosovo and Metohija. At the same time, he was vice-president and later deputy chairman of the Coordination Body for the Presevo, Bujanovac and Medvedja municipalities. Former deputy president of DSS, president of the DSS Economic Council and deputy in the National Assembly of the Republic of Serbia.

As Vice-President of the National Assembly of the Republic of Serbia, he was one of the main observers of the electoral process in a referendum on annexation of Crimea by the Russian Federation.

His name was mentioned in the Paradise Papers in connection to owning several off-shore companies. Value of his business undertakings reaches 100 million dollars, making him officially the richest Serbian politician.

On 29 June 2017, he was named the Minister without portfolio in the Government of Serbia in the charge of the innovations and technological development. On 3 July 2017, Aleksandr Chepurin, Russian Federation Ambassador to Serbia, made a first official visit to Popović after being sworn as minister.

In July 2019 Popovic stated that "there was no genocide in Srebrenica and Serbs will never accept to be stamped as genocidal people." He said Serbia should rethink its goal of becoming a European Union member because of such claims.

=== Other businesses ===
Popović is the owner and president of the international company ABS Electro which employs over three thousand people, engaged in the production of electrical-technical equipment, creating advanced engineering solutions for a variety of industries such as electrical power, shipbuilding, oil, gas, metal, mining, and others.

He is the president of the Foundation "Russian Necropolises" from Belgrade, which was responsible for the project of reconstruction of the complex of memorial monuments Russian necropolises in the New Cemetery in Belgrade. Popović is also member of the Board of the International Fun of Unity of Orthodox Nations.

==== Sanctions ====
On 16 November 2023 the U.S. Department of State sanctioned Nenad Popović pursuant to E.O. 14024 for operating in or having operated in the electronics sector of the Russian Federation economy. A number of companies controlled by Popović were also sanctioned.

== Awards and honors ==
- Medal of Holy Sergey Radoniesky, for exceptional contribution to the development and straightening of relations among Eastern Orthodox Christian nations, awarded by the Patriarch of Moscow and All Russia
- Medal of Holy Daniel of Moscow, for the spiritual renaissance of Russia, awarded by the Patriarch of Moscow and all Russia
- Medal of Humanity Award of the State Union Serbia and Montenegro for humanitarian work and exceptional contribution and help to the Serb population in Kosovo and Metohija
- Order of Friendship, for special contribution to the development of economic and social relationships between Serbia and Russia, awarded by the President of the Russian Federation;
- Order of the Saint Sava of the Second Grade, for the renewal and strengthening of faith and the Serbian Orthodox Church, awarded by the Serbian Patriarch
- Order of the Venerable Seraphim of Sarov, for a special contribution to the revival of monasteries, churches, temples as well as church-social activism, awarded by the Patriarch of Moscow and all Russia

Political offices
Preceded by Jadranka Joksimović	Minister without portfolio of Serbia; 2017–present	Incumbent
