= Đorđe Milićević =

Serbian politician (born 1978)

- Ђорђе Милићевић
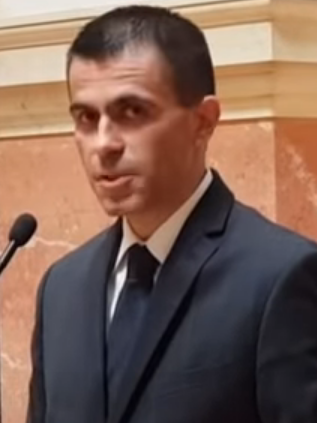
- Milićević in 2019

Minister without portfolio
- Incumbent
- Assumed office 26 October 2022
- Prime Minister: Ana Brnabić; Ivica Dačić (acting); Miloš Vučević; Đuro Macut

Minister of Education
- Acting
- In office 31 May 2023 – 25 July 2023
- Prime Minister: Ana Brnabić
- Preceded by: Branko Ružić
- Succeeded by: Slavica Đukić Dejanović

Member of the National Assembly
- In office 11 June 2008 – 24 October 2022

Personal details
- Born: 29 September 1978 (age 47) Valjevo, SR Serbia, SFR Yugoslavia
- Party: SPS (1996–present)
- Occupation: Politician

Đorđe Milićević (Serbian Cyrillic: Ђорђе Милићевић; born 29 September 1978) is a Serbian politician serving as minister without portfolio since 2022. A member of the Socialist Party of Serbia (SPS), he also served as acting minister of education after the resignation of Branko Ružić.

He was a member of the National Assembly of Serbia from 2008 to 2022. Milićević was the leader of the party's parliamentary group and a deputy speaker in the assembly from 2015 to 2022.

== Early life and private career ==
Milićević was born in Valjevo, then part of the Socialist Republic of Serbia in the Socialist Federal Republic of Yugoslavia. He has an economics degree, was a journalist for several publications, and played football for a number of clubs.

== Political career ==
=== Local politics ===
Milićević joined the Socialist Party of Serbia in 1996 and led the party organization in Valjevo since 2002. In a 2011 interview, he said that he joined the party "at the time when it was hard being a Socialist"; he added that he became politically active in order to participate in "the struggle for an economically prosperous and culturally developed society where people will have equal chances in life." He has been elected to the Valjevo city assembly on four occasions, in the local elections of 2004, 2008, 2012, and 2016, and served as vice-president of the municipal assembly in 2004.

=== Parliamentarian ===
Milićević received the 131st position on the Socialist Party's electoral list in the 2000 Serbian parliamentary election and the 148th position in the 2003 election. He was not included in the party's parliamentary delegation on either occasion. (From 2000 to 2011, Serbian parliamentary mandates were awarded to sponsoring parties or coalitions rather than to individual candidates, and it was common practice for mandates to be awarded out of numerical order. The Socialist Party lists in 2000 and 2003 were mostly alphabetical; Milićević could have been awarded a mandate despite his relatively low position, although in the event he was not.)

He was elected to the Socialist Party of Serbia's main board in 2007 and was again included on its electoral list for the 2008 Serbian parliamentary election. The list won twenty seats, and he was on this occasion chosen as part of the party's assembly delegation. The party joined a coalition government led by the Democratic Party after the election, and Milićević served as part of its parliamentary majority. He became an official spokesperson for the party during this time.

In February 2009, the International Criminal Tribunal for the former Yugoslavia convicted five leading figures from former Yugoslav president Slobodan Milošević's regime of war crimes against Kosovo Albanians during the 1999 NATO bombing of Yugoslavia. Milićević responded by saying, "In the softest possible terms, this is an unjust verdict. Those who defended their country and their people against aggression were convicted." He added that he expected the convictions to be overturned on appeal. Later in the same year, he commented that it would be possible for Serbia to join the European Union without also joining the North Atlantic Treaty Organization (NATO). He also articulated his party's view that Kosovo and Metohija is an integral part of Serbia, further adding, "The issue of Kosovo should be resolved by diplomatic means, based on UN Security Council Resolution 1244. For us the only acceptable way is the government policy that Serbia is conducting, and that is the defence of its national integrity and territorial sovereignty, and the EU."

Serbia's electoral system was reformed in 2011, such that parliamentary mandates were awarded in numerical order to candidates on successful lists. Milićević received the thirty-first position on the Socialist Party's electoral list for the 2012 parliamentary election and was elected when the party won forty-four mandates. The Socialist Party joined a new coalition government led by the Serbian Progressive Party after the election, and Milićević became deputy leader of the Socialist Party group in the assembly. In February 2013, he dismissed suggestions about tensions between the Socialists and Progressives, saying that the parties were united on core issues.

Milićević received the thirty-eighth position on the Socialist Party's electoral list in the 2014 parliamentary election and was re-elected when the list again won forty-four mandates. He was selected as head of the Socialist Party's group in the assembly in September 2015. Milićević was promoted to the eighteenth position on the party's list for the 2016 election and was returned for a fourth term when the list won twenty-nine seats. While retaining his role as Socialist group leader, he was also named as a deputy speaker of the assembly. The Socialists have remained part of Serbia's coalition government throughout this time.

Milićević is currently a member of the assembly's defence and internal affairs committee; a member of the committee on administrative, budgetary, mandate and immunity issues; a member of the committee on the rights of the child; a deputy member of the committee on finance, state spending, and control of public spending; and a member of the parliamentary friendship groups with Belarus, China, Germany, Hungary, Russia, and the United States of America. He previously served as a delegate to the Parliamentary Assembly of the Council of Europe from 2012 to 2014 and as a deputy member of the standing delegation to the Parliamentary Dimension of the Central European Initiative from 2014 to 2016.
