= Milan Krkobabić =

Serbian politician (born 1952)

- Милан Кркобабић
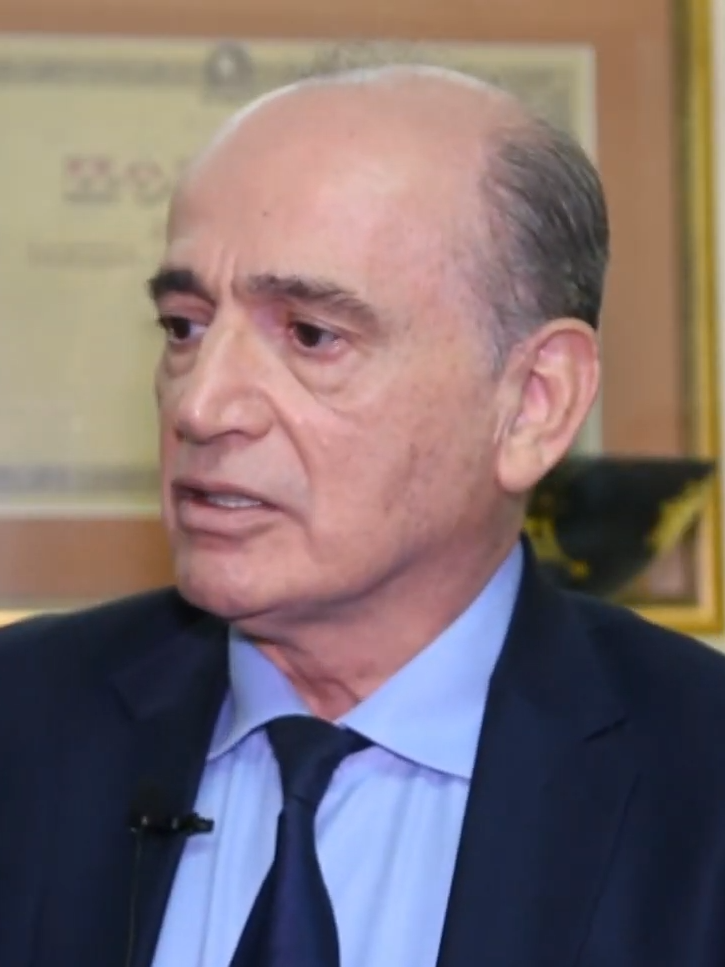
- Krkobabić in 2019

Minister of Rural Welfare
- Incumbent
- Assumed office 28 October 2020
- Prime Minister: Ana Brnabić; Ivica Dačić (acting); Miloš Vučević; Đuro Macut
- Preceded by: Office established

Minister without portfolio in charge of regional development
- In office 11 August 2016 – 28 October 2020
- Prime Minister: Aleksandar Vučić; Ivica Dačić (acting); Ana Brnabić

Member of the National Assembly of the Republic of Serbia
- In office 6 February 2024 – 30 April 2024
- In office 1 August 2022 – 24 October 2022
- In office 3 August 2020 – 26 October 2020
- In office 31 May 2012 – 11 August 2016

Leader of the Party of United Pensioners, Farmers, and Proletarians of Serbia – Solidarity and Justice
- Incumbent
- Assumed office June 2014
- Preceded by: Jovan Krkobabić

Personal details
- Born: 12 October 1952 (age 73) Kačarevo, PR Serbia, FPR Yugoslavia
- Party: PUPS
- Children: Stefan Krkobabić
- Parent: Jovan Krkobabić
- Education: University of Belgrade
- Other offices: 2012–2016: Director of Pošta Srbije; 19 August 2008–12 June 2012: Deputy Mayor of Belgrade; 14 July 2008–19 August 2008; 12 June 2012–18 November 2013; 23 April 2014–28 May 2014: Member of the City Assembly of Belgrade

Milan Krkobabić (Serbian Cyrillic: Милан Кркобабић; born 12 October 1952) is a Serbian politician. A member of the Krkobabić political family, he has led the Party of United Pensioners, Farmers, and Proletarians of Serbia (PUPS) since 2014. He was a minister without portfolio in Serbia's government from 2016 to 2020 and has been minister of rural welfare since October 2020. Krkobabić previously served as deputy mayor of Belgrade from 2008 to 2012.

== Early life and career ==
Krkobabić was born in Kačarevo, Autonomous Province of Vojvodina, in what was then the People's Republic of Serbia in the Federal People's Republic of Yugoslavia. He later moved with his family to Belgrade, where he completed high school and graduated from the University of Belgrade Faculty of Economics. He has thirty years of experience in the financial sector.

His father, Jovan Krkobabić, was the founder and first leader of the PUPS.

== Politician ==
Krkobabić joined the PUPS on its formation as the Party of United Pensioners of Serbia in 2005; the party was known by this name until June 2022. It contested the 2007 Serbian parliamentary election on a combined electoral list with the Social Democratic Party (SDP), and Krkobabić was included in the 105th position. The list did not cross the electoral threshold to win representation in the national assembly.

=== City of Belgrade ===
The PUPS formed an alliance with the Socialist Party of Serbia (SPS) prior to the 2008 parliamentary election. Krkobabić was not a candidate at the republic level in that year but instead received the second position on a SPS-led list in the concurrent 2008 Belgrade city assembly election. The list won six seats, and he was given a mandate. Neither the republic nor the Belgrade city elections produced a clear winner, and representatives of the Socialist Party, the far-right Serbian Radical Party (SRS), and the Democratic Party of Serbia (DSS) discussed forming coalition governments at both levels of administration. Krkobabić said that this arrangement would be acceptable to the PUPS as it would ensure passage of some of the party's program.

Negotiations among these parties subsequently broke down, and the Socialists instead formed coalition governments at both the republic and city levels with the For a European Serbia (ZES) alliance led by the Democratic Party (DS). The PUPS participated in the new governments, and Krkobabić said it would use its influence to fight for a pension increase and resist any efforts to impose neoliberal reforms. He became Belgrade's deputy mayor, serving under Dragan Đilas.

In October 2009, Krkobabić and Russian ambassador Aleksandr Konuzin inaugurated a statue of Alexander Pushkin in the centre of Belgrade, not far from the statues of Cyril and Methodius and Vuk Karadžić.

Krkobabić later defended Belgrade's decision to erect a statue of former Azerbaijani president Heydar Aliyev in Tašmajdan Park, which the government of Azerbaijan had donated two million Euros to renovate following extensive damage in the 1999 NATO bombing of Yugoslavia. The statue attracted controversy due to the Azerbaijani president's human rights record while in office. Krkobabić said in response, "Our principle was not to be policemen and to investigate what was done in the past because we would not have time for that. Our principle was to draw a line and to move forward. In these hard times, we are trying to accept every act of goodwill by various countries and to use them for the benefit of the citizens of Belgrade."

=== National Assembly member and Pošta Srbije director ===
The PUPS maintained its alliance with the Socialist Party for the 2012 Serbian parliamentary election. Krkobabić was a spokesperson for his party in this campaign, highlighting its promise to protect and improve pensions. He was given the thirteenth position on the SPS's list and was elected to his first term in the national assembly when the list won forty-four mandates. He also received the second position on the Socialist-led list in the concurrent 2012 Belgrade election and was re-elected when the list won thirteen seats. He served in both assemblies under a dual mandate, although he did not continue as deputy mayor.

The Socialist Party formed a new coalition government with the Serbian Progressive Party (SNS) and other parties at the republic level after the 2012 election, and the PUPS was included in the government. Krkobabić led the PUPS group in the national assembly.

He was appointed as director of the state-owned corporation Pošta Srbije in late 2012 and afterward announced plans to privatize certain entities owned by the corporation, including Telekom Srbija and the Belgrade Nikola Tesla Airport. He said that the corporation itself would not be privatized but would seek to acquire assets in other Balkan states. He was quoted as saying, "We will not repeat the experiences from the neighbouring countries. This system will strengthen, it will be profitable, fill the budget and create new jobs. We put an end to all attempts to sell, sell off, and disintegrate the system." In the same period, Krkobabić said that the corporation would focus on completing a number of capital investment projects, including a central postal hub in Belgrade. In July 2013, he announced that Pošta Srbije had tripled its net income in the first six months of the year.

Despite its alliance with the Socialists and Progressives at the republic level, the PUPS initially continued to work in a coalition government with the DS in Belgrade. In this period, Krkobabić supported Đilas's administration at the city level and opposed the SNS's efforts to change the government. In November 2012, he was a guest at the Democratic Party convention that elected Đilas as the party's new leader. This alliance did not last, however, and in September 2013 Krkobabić and the PUPS withdrew their support from Đilas in a crucial vote of non-confidence. Đilas lost his assembly majority and resigned as mayor. These events led to new republican and city elections in early 2014.

Krkobabić was promoted to the second position on the Socialist-led list in the 2014 republic election. During the campaign, he said that Serbian politics had become marked by "a split between the left and the right, where the left is working for the people, and the right-wing is lining its pockets." Progressive Party leader Aleksandar Vučić responded by saying, "if that's the way to look at it, Krkobabić belongs to the extreme right-wing." The Socialist list again won forty-four mandates, and Krkobabić was elected to a second term. The Progressive Party and its allies won a majority victory and afterward formed a new coalition government that again included the Socialists. The PUPS did not participate directly in the government but provided outside support; notwithstanding his exchange with Vučić in the campaign, Krkobabić became part of the latter's assembly majority. In his second term, Krkobabić was a member of the administrative committee (Note: Formally known as the Committee on Administrative, Budgetary, Mandate, and Immunity Issues.) and continued to serve as Pošta Srbije director.

Krkobabić also received the second position on the Socialist-led list in the 2014 Belgrade city election. He was re-elected when the list won sixteen seats but resigned from the city assembly shortly thereafter.

=== Early years as party leader ===
Jovan Krkobabić died in April 2014, and Milan was chosen to lead the PUPS in June of the same year.

In July 2014, he indicated that the PUPS would support two contentious bills dealing with changes to labour law and pension and disability insurance. He justified this decision on the basis that the reforms "[did] not affect the existing pensioners." He supported direct payouts to Pošta Srbije workers in October of the same year, saying that the workers should receive a percentage of the corporation's profits.

Vučić and Krkobabić opened Pošta Srbije's central Belgrade hub on 9 October 2014. The corporation continued to earn net profits through 2015, and Krkobabić again opposed calls for its privatization. In October 2015, he noted that Toshiba had expressed interest in pairing with Pošta Srbije for investments in Russia. The following year, he and Rasim Ljajić, Serbia's minister of trade, tourism, and telecommunications, signed a collective agreement with Pošta Srbije workers that, among other things, confirmed their right to a share of the corporation's profits.

In May 2016, he announced that Pošta Srbije would set up a commercial bank.

=== Government minister ===
The PUPS ended its electoral alliance with the Socialist Party and formed a new partnership with the Progressives for the 2016 Serbian parliamentary election. Krkobabić received the fourth position on the SNS-led list and was re-elected when it won a second consecutive majority with 131 out of 250 mandates. On 11 August 2016, he was appointed as a minister without portfolio in Vučić's administration, with responsibility for regional development. He stood down as director of Pošta Srbije shortly thereafter, as he could not hold both positions concurrently. He was later given further responsibilities as chair of Serbia's council for coordination of activities and measures for gross domestic product (GDP) growth.

Krkobabić was reaffirmed as a minister without portfolio when Ana Brnabić replaced Vučić as prime minister of Serbia in June 2017. Shortly after this, he announced a significant government investment in agricultural co-operatives to ensure that younger people could choose to live in rural settings. In January 2018, he said that 250 co-operatives had been created under his government's supervision; two years later, he said that the number had increased to 722. During this period, Krkobabić described the co-operatives as the greatest existing opportunity for the survival of Serbia's family farms.

The PUPS continued its alliance with the Progressive Party in the 2020 Serbian parliamentary election. Krkobabić received the twenty-fourth position on the Progressive-led electoral list and was again elected to the assembly when the list won a landslide victory with 188 seats. (His son Stefan Krkobabić was also elected as a PUPS member.) He was promoted to a full cabinet portfolio in October 2020 as Serbia's first minister for rural welfare. After his appointment, he said that one of his priorities would be organizing the transfer of uncultivated state land to young farmers and young experts. In April 2021, he spoke in favour of a "green ring" around Belgrade to supply fresh and healthy food products to Belgrade and other Serbian cities. At the same time, he announced a program for allocating empty houses, of which he said there were around 150,000 in Serbia. In January 2022, he said that half a billion dollars would be directed for the purchase and allocation of another five hundred houses in rural areas.

Krkbabić received the thirty-fifth position on the SNS-led list in the 2022 Serbian parliamentary election and was elected to a fifth assembly term when the list won a plurality victory with 120 mandates. He was re-appointed afterward to the same cabinet portfolio as before. He continued to promote agricultural co-operatives; while opening a new co-operative school in Bač in October 2023, he said, "Co-operatives are a necessity for the survival of villages [...] And practice confirms that wherever there are successful cooperatives and villages, they are alive - with a rich cultural and sports life."

He again appeared in the thirty-fifth position on the SNS-led list in the 2023 parliamentary election and was elected to a sixth term when the list won a majority victory with 129 seats. He resigned his assembly seat on 30 April 2024 after being re-appointed as minister of rural welfare in Serbia's new ministry under Miloš Vučević. In October 2024, he announced that 3,309 houses in total had been purchased under his department's program for young people to return to the countryside.
