= Miščević =

Miščević is a Slavic surname of Serbian origin. Notable people with the surname include:

- Goran Miscevic (born 1963), Croatian-Canadian football coach
- Ljubodrag Miščević (born 1960), Serbian politician
- Tanja Miščević (born 1966), Serbian political scientist
