= Faculty of Political Sciences, University of Belgrade =

University faculty in Belgrade, Serbia

University of Belgrade Faculty of Political Sciences
- Факултет политичких наука Универзитета у Београду; Fakultet političkih nauka Univerziteta u Beogradu
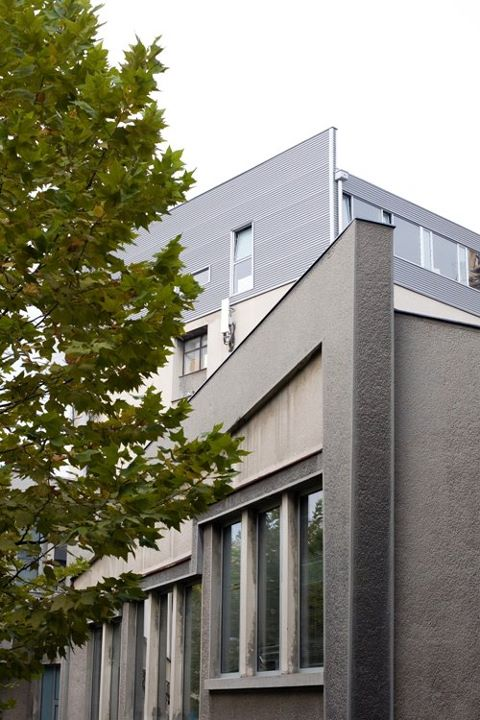
- Other name: FPN
- Type: Public
- Established: 1968; 58 years ago
- Affiliations: University of Belgrade
- Dean: Maja Kovačević
- Faculty: 119 (2018–19)
- Students: 4,113 (2018–19)
- Undergraduates: 2,853 (2018–19)
- Postgraduates: 992 (2018–19)
- Doctoral students: 268 (2018–19)
- Location: Belgrade, Serbia; 44.773663°N 20.475832°E
- Campus: Urban
- Colors: Blue and white
- Website: www.fpn.bg.ac.rs

The Faculty of Political Sciences (Serbian: Факултет политичких наука Универзитета у Београду, romanized: Fakultet političkih nauka Univerziteta u Beogradu, abbreviated FPN) is a constituent institution of the University of Belgrade which focuses on education and research in the fields of political science, international relations, journalism and communication studies, and social policy and social work. It was established in 1968, as a first faculty of this type in former Yugoslavia.

The building, built in the Brutalist style, is located in the urban neighborhood of Voždovac, close to the Faculty of Organizational Sciences. The Faculty of Political Sciences offers BA, MA and PhD programmes, as well as advanced professional development programmes.

== History ==
The Faculty of Political Sciences was established in 1968, after the National Assembly of Serbia brought an establishment act. It was the first institution of its kind in former Yugoslavia. Since its founding to 2013, it has educated more than 8,100 students, with 975 of them having completed MA programmes, and 464 having defended their PhD theses. Many of the alumni have become recognized experts and scholars, professors and high ranking government officials.

Many of the faculties of political sciences, established subsequently in other parts of the former Yugoslavia were formed from the University of Belgrade Faculty of Political Sciences as a core, and a large number of professors at the various faculties of political sciences in all the countries of the former Yugoslavia, had obtained their academic titles at the University of Belgrade Faculty of Political Sciences.

Celebration of the faculty's 40th anniversary was held in the hall of the National Assembly of Serbia in November 2008. It was sponsored by the President of Serbia. An international conference "State and Democracy" was held as a part of anniversary.

== Academic staff ==
The University of Belgrade Faculty of Political Sciences has among its academic staff some of the most eminent experts in the field of political sciences, as well as in a range of others (economy, sociology, philosophy, law, history, etc.) Amongst them, there are many widely recognized within the domestic and international academic community, as well as former or current high government officials – ministers, ambassadors, etc.

Notable members of the academic staff include:

- Dragan Veselinov, Minister of Agriculture (2001–2003)
- Ivo Visković, Ambassador of Serbia to Germany (2009–2013)
- Slobodan Samardžić, Minister for Kosovo-Metohija (2007–2008)
- Čedomir Čupić, chairman of the board of The Anti-Corruption Agency of the Republic of Serbia (2009–2011)
- Tanja Miščević, Chief Negotiator for Serbia’s accession negotiations with the EU, former State secretary of the Ministry of Defence of the Republic of Serbia (2008–2012), and minister of European Integration (since 2022)

== Student life ==
Student life at the Faculty includes a diverse array of student activities. Student organisations at the Faculty of Political Sciences include a Debate Club, European Students Forum, Youth Team Initiative TIM, Serbian Political Forum SPF, United Nations Club, Diplomatic Forum, Action for Political Emancipation of Youth APEM and many others. Students also elect their representatives (Student Vice-Dean and the Student Parliament) to represent their interests in the Faculty bodies, participate in the evaluation of studies and the faculty, and secure the involvement and participation of students in all matters and issues of interest to them.

Students periodically publish their own newspaper – Politikolog (The Political Scientist), and take part in various competitions through their sports club. Also, students of journalism prepare radio and TV shows which are broadcast on radios and televisions with national frequencies.

== Professional gatherings ==
Students have the opportunity to participate in numerous events and gatherings (national and international). Student Conference at Kopaonik which is held every year provides them with the chance to discuss the most recent developments in both domestic and international politics with prominent experts, professors and diplomats. Study trips that are organized every year include visits to Serbia's diplomatic missions across Europe, European Parliament, European Court of Human Rights, United Nations, International Committee of the Red Cross and many other institutions. Also, a regional gathering of political sciences students called "Politijada" is being held every year with students from Serbia, Montenegro, Bosnia and Herzegovina, North Macedonia and Slovenia taking part.
