= List of diplomatic missions of Serbia =

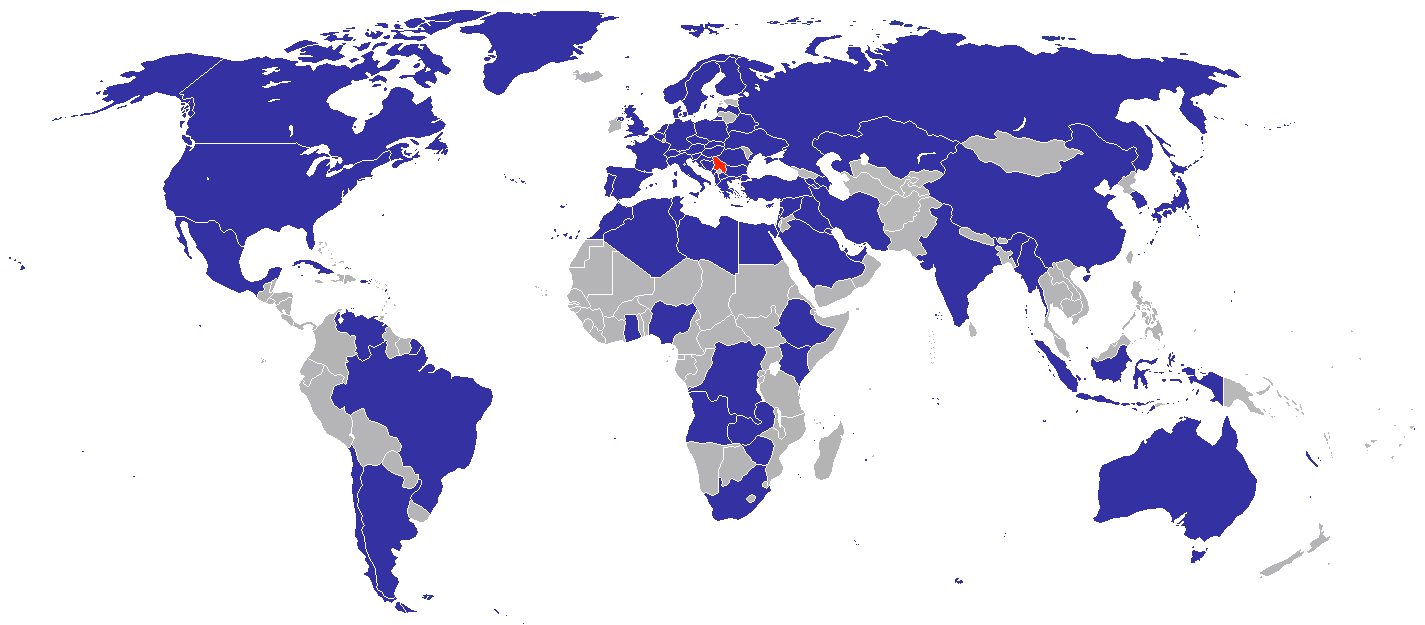
Diplomatic missions of Serbia (red) and its embassies (blue)

This is a list of diplomatic missions of Serbia.

Serbia has a significant number of embassies, consulates, and missions to multilateral organizations, including: 78 embassies, 25 consulates in 15 countries, and 7 diplomatic missions.

Honorary consulates and trade missions are excluded from this listing.

== History ==
Serbia inherited about a third of the diplomatic facilities that belonged to the former Yugoslavia. In period from 2001 to 2006 embassies in Chile, Colombia, Congo-Kinshasa, Ghana, Guinea, Lebanon, Mongolia, North Korea, Pakistan, Thailand, Venezuela, Vietnam, and Zimbabwe were closed due to financial or reciprocal reasons. In 2008 the Government of Serbia made a decision to close consulates in Bari, Graz, and Malmö, and later that year Foreign Minister Vuk Jeremić announced a plan to open a consulate-general in Knin (Croatia) during the autumn and an embassy in Kuala Lumpur (Malaysia). Foreign Minister also announced that some diplomatic missions might be closed but also announced a plan for opening missions in Kazakhstan, Los Angeles, Pakistan, United Arab Emirates and Venezuela. Construction of the new embassy in Washington and reconstruction of the existing buildings in Paris, Nairobi and Brussels is also planned. In late 2008, it was announced that due to the 2008 financial crisis expansion plans will be reviewed. In April 2009, Ministry of Foreign Affairs announced that consulate in Croatia will be moved from Rijeka to Knin in Croatia. In May 2009 it was announced that the embassy in Peru will be temporarily closed and that the consulate-general in Lyon will be closed while the embassy in Kenya was to be reopened.

Due to the legal succession of the Yugoslav properties abroad, Serbia was obliged to hand over chanceries in Vienna, The Hague, and Lisbon (to Croatia); Rome (to Slovenia); Canberra (to the then-Republic of Macedonia), Ankara, Madrid, Oslo and Ottawa (to Bosnia and Herzegovina); as well as consular chanceries in Klagenfurt, Milan (to Slovenia), Toronto (to Croatia), Zürich and Athens (Macedonia). In 2010, the Government of Serbia made a decision to open embassies in Kazakhstan, Azerbaijan and Qatar and reopen embassies in Congo-Kinshasa and Ghana in 2011 and announced a plan to open embassies in Oman, Chile, Venezuela and Pakistan in the future. In 2011, Serbia opened its embassies in Azerbaijan and Kazakhstan, and consulate-general in Herceg Novi.

In 2006, the Government of Serbia adopted the Memorandum of Agreement between the Republic of Montenegro and the Republic of Serbia on Consular Protection and Services to the Citizens of Montenegro. By this agreement, Serbian diplomatic missions provide consular services to the Montenegrin citizens on the territory of states in which Montenegro has no missions of its own. In 2012, Serbia signed a similar agreement with Bosnia and Herzegovina that also allowed Serbian citizens to use Bosnian diplomatic and consular offices, namely those in Jordan, Malaysia, Pakistan, Qatar, Saudi Arabia, and the United Arab Emirates. However, in 2013 the Government of Serbia has adopted a decision to establish full diplomatic relations with the United Arab Emirates and Saudi Arabia.

== Current missions ==
Africa
Host country	Host city	Mission	Head of mission	Concurrent accreditation	References
Algeria	Algiers	Embassy	Biljana Ranković Bekić, chargé d'affaires	Countries: Guinea; Guinea-Bissau; Mali	
Angola	Luanda	Embassy	Miloš Perišić, ambassador	Countries: Equatorial Guinea; Gabon; Namibia; São Tomé and Príncipe	
Congo-Kinshasa	Kinshasa	Embassy	Miroljub Jevtić, ambassador	Countries: Cameroon; Central African Republic; Chad; Congo-Brazzaville	
Egypt	Cairo	Embassy	Miroslav Šestović, ambassador	Countries: Oman; Palestine; Sudan	
Ethiopia	Addis Ababa	Embassy	Davor Trkulja, ambassador		
Ghana	Accra	Embassy	Milutin Stanojević, ambassador		
Kenya	Nairobi	Embassy	Danijela Čubrilo Martić, ambassador	Countries: Burundi; Comoros; Djibouti; Eritrea; Rwanda; Seychelles; Somalia; South Sudan; Uganda	
Libya	Tripoli	Embassy	Dragan Todorović, ambassador		
Morocco	Rabat	Embassy	Ivan Bauer, ambassador	Countries: Mauritania; Senegal	
Nigeria	Abuja	Embassy	Aleksandra Jerić, chargé d'affaires	Countries: Benin; Burkina Faso; Gambia; Liberia; Niger; Ivory Coast; Sierra Leone; Togo	
South Africa	Pretoria	Embassy	Saša Mart, ambassador	Countries: Botswana; Eswatini; Lesotho; Madagascar; Malawi; Mauritius; Mozambique	
Tanzania	Dodoma	Embassy	Jovica Topalović, ambassador		
Tunisia	Tunis	Embassy	Dijana Ivančić, ambassador		
Zambia	Lusaka	Embassy	Jasna Zrnović, ambassador		
Zimbabwe	Harare	Embassy	Radiša Grujić, ambassador		
Americas
Host country	Host city	Mission	Head of mission	Concurrent accreditation	References
Argentina	Buenos Aires	Embassy	Veljko Lazić, ambassador	Countries: Bolivia; Ecuador; Paraguay; Peru; Uruguay	
Brazil	Brasília	Embassy	Aleksandar Ristić, ambassador		
Canada	Ottawa	Embassy	Stefan Tomašević, ambassador		
Canada	Toronto	Consulate-General	Dejan Eraković, consul-general		
Chile	Santiago de Chile	Embassy	Mirjana Kotlajić, ambassador		
Cuba	Havana	Embassy	Jelena Živojinović, chargé d'affaires	Countries: Dominican Republic; Haiti; Jamaica	
Mexico	Mexico City	Embassy	Neda Smiljanić, chargé d'affaires	Countries: Costa Rica; El Salvador; Guatemala; Honduras; Nicaragua; Panama	
United States	Washington, D.C.	Embassy	Dragan Šutanovac, ambassador	Countries: Antigua and Barbuda; Bahamas; Barbados; Belize; Colombia; Dominica; Grenada; Guyana; Saint Kitts and Nevis; Saint Lucia; Saint Vincent and the Grenadines; Suriname; Trinidad and Tobago; International Organizations: Association of Caribbean States; Caribbean Community; Organization of American States	
United States	Chicago	Consulate-General	Marko Nikolić, consul-general	Countries: Antigua and Barbuda; Bahamas; Barbados; Belize; Colombia; Dominica; Grenada; Guyana; Saint Kitts and Nevis; Saint Lucia; Saint Vincent and the Grenadines; Suriname; Trinidad and Tobago; International Organizations: Association of Caribbean States; Caribbean Community; Organization of American States	
United States	New York City	Consulate-General	Vladimir Božović, consul-general	Countries: Antigua and Barbuda; Bahamas; Barbados; Belize; Colombia; Dominica; Grenada; Guyana; Saint Kitts and Nevis; Saint Lucia; Saint Vincent and the Grenadines; Suriname; Trinidad and Tobago; International Organizations: Association of Caribbean States; Caribbean Community; Organization of American States	
Venezuela	Caracas	Embassy	Katarina Andrić, ambassador		
Asia
Host country	Host city	Mission	Head of mission	Concurrent accreditation	References
Armenia	Yerevan	Embassy	Tatjana Panajotović Cvetković, ambassador	Countries: Georgia	
Azerbaijan	Baku	Embassy	Dragan Vladisavljević, ambassador		
Bahrain	Manama	Embassy	Tatjana Garčević, ambassador		
China	Beijing	Embassy	Maja Stefanović, ambassador	Countries: Mongolia; North Korea	
China	Shanghai	Consulate-General	Ninoslav Erić, consul-general	Countries: Mongolia; North Korea	
India	New Delhi	Embassy	Siniša Pavić, ambassador	Countries: Bangladesh; Bhutan; Maldives; Nepal; Sri Lanka	
Indonesia	Jakarta	Embassy	Ivana Golubović-Duboka, ambassador	Countries: Brunei; Cambodia; Malaysia; Philippines; Singapore; Thailand; Timor-Leste; Vietnam; International Organizations: Association of Southeast Asian Nations	
Iran	Tehran	Embassy	Damir Kovačević, ambassador	Countries: Afghanistan; Pakistan	
Iraq	Baghdad	Embassy	Branislav Žeželj, ambassador		
Israel	Tel Aviv	Embassy	Miroljub Petrović, ambassador		
Japan	Tokyo	Embassy	Aleksandra Kovač, ambassador	Countries: Palau	
Kazakhstan	Astana	Embassy	Vladimir Jovičić, ambassador		
Kuwait	Kuwait City	Embassy	Filip Katić, chargé d'affaires	Countries: Yemen	
Lebanon	Beirut	Embassy	Milan Trojanović, ambassador		
Myanmar	Yangon	Embassy	Gordana Jakšić, chargé d'affaires	Countries: Laos	
Qatar	Doha	Embassy	Marija Jović, chargé d'affaires		
Saudi Arabia	Riyadh	Embassy	Dragan Bisenić, ambassador		
South Korea	Seoul	Embassy	Aleksandar Đorđević, chargé d'affaires		
Syria	Damascus	Embassy	Radovan Stojanović, ambassador	Countries: Jordan	
Turkey	Ankara	Embassy	Aca Jovanović, ambassador		
Turkey	Istanbul	Consulate-General	Aleksandar Marjanović, consul-general		
United Arab Emirates	Abu Dhabi	Embassy	Vladimir Maric, ambassador		
Europe
Host country	Host city	Mission	Head	Concurrent accreditation	References
Albania	Tirana	Embassy	Slobodan Vukčević, ambassador		
Austria	Vienna	Embassy	Marko Blagojević, ambassador		
Austria	Salzburg	Consulate-General	Vera Vukićević, consul-general		
Belarus	Minsk	Embassy	Ilina Vukajlović, ambassador		
Belgium	Brussels	Embassy	Aleksandar Tasić, ambassador	Countries: Luxembourg	
Bosnia and Herzegovina	Sarajevo	Embassy	Ivan Todorov, ambassador		
Bosnia and Herzegovina	Banja Luka	Consulate-General	Miloš Vujić, consul-general		
Bosnia and Herzegovina	Mostar	Consulate-General	Vaso Gujić, consul-general		
Bosnia and Herzegovina	Drvar	Consular office	Vesna Marinković		
Bosnia and Herzegovina	Trebinje	Consular office	Miodrag Džudžalija		
Bulgaria	Sofia	Embassy	Milan Ravić, ambassador		
Croatia	Zagreb	Embassy	Dejana Peruničić, ambassador		
Croatia	Rijeka	Consulate-General	Ivana Stojiljković, consul-general		
Croatia	Vukovar	Consulate-General	Vladimir Marjanović, consul-general		
Cyprus	Nicosia	Embassy	Suzana Bošković-Prodanović, ambassador		
Czechia	Prague	Embassy	Berislav Vekić, ambassador		
Denmark	Copenhagen	Embassy	Mirjana Živković, ambassador		
Finland	Helsinki	Embassy	Aleksandar Janković, ambassador	Countries: Estonia	
France	París	Embassy	Ana Hrustanović, ambassador	Countries: Monaco; International Organizations: Francophonie	
France	Strasbourg	Consulate	Slavoljub Carić, consul	Countries: Monaco; International Organizations: Francophonie	
Germany	Berlin	Embassy	Snežana Janković, ambassador		
Germany	Düsseldorf	Consulate-General	Nebojša Tatomir, consul-general		
Germany	Frankfurt	Consulate-General	Aleksandar Đurđić, consul-general		
Germany	Hamburg	Consulate-General	Milena Nikolić, consul-general		
Germany	Munich	Consulate-General	Božidar Vučurović, consul-general		
Germany	Stuttgart	Consulate-General	Dragan Dimitrijević, consul-general		
Greece	Athens	Embassy	Nikola Nedeljković, ambassador		
Greece	Thessaloniki	Consulate-General	Jelena Vujić-Obradović, consul-general		
Holy See	Rome	Embassy (Note: The Serbian Embassy to the Holy See is located outside Vatican territory in Rome.)	Sima Avramović, ambassador	Sovereign Entity: Sovereign Military Order of Malta	
Hungary	Budapest	Embassy	Aleksandra Đurović, ambassador		
Italy	Rome	Embassy	Mirjana Jeremić, ambassador	Countries: Malta; San Marino; International Organizations: Food and Agriculture Organization; International Fund for Agricultural Development; World Food Programme	
Italy	Milan	Consulate-General	Nataša Savićević, consul-general	Countries: Malta; San Marino; International Organizations: Food and Agriculture Organization; International Fund for Agricultural Development; World Food Programme	
Italy	Trieste	Consulate-General	Nemanja Sekicki, consul-general	Countries: Malta; San Marino; International Organizations: Food and Agriculture Organization; International Fund for Agricultural Development; World Food Programme	
Latvia	Riga	Embassy	Milena Mitić, ambassador		
Malta	Valletta	Embassy Office (Note: Subordinate to the Serbian Embassy in Rome.)	Boško Šukić, chargé d'affaires		
Montenegro	Podgorica	Embassy	Nebojša Rodić, ambassador		
Montenegro	Herceg Novi	Consulate-General	Jasmina Milačić, consul-general		
Netherlands	The Hague	Embassy	Marina Jovićević, ambassador		
North Macedonia	Skopje	Embassy			
Norway	Oslo	Embassy	Jasmina Mitrović Marić, ambassador	Countries: Iceland	
Poland	Warsaw	Embassy	Nebojša Košutić, ambassador	Countries: Lithuania	
Portugal	Lisbon	Embassy	Ana Ilić, ambassador	Countries: Cape Verde	
Romania	Bucharest	Embassy	Nina Veličković, chargé d'affaires	Countries: Moldova	
Romania	Timișoara	Consulate-General	Ivana Jakšić Matović, consul-general	Countries: Moldova	
Russia	Moscow	Embassy	Momčilo Babić, ambassador	Countries: Kyrgyzstan; Tajikistan; Turkmenistan; Uzbekistan	
Slovakia	Bratislava	Embassy	Aleksandar Nakić, ambassador		
Slovenia	Ljubljana	Embassy	Ivo Vojvodić, ambassador		
Spain	Madrid	Embassy	Irena Šarac, ambassador	Countries: Andorra	
Sweden	Stockholm	Embassy	Jelena Čukić Matić, ambassador		
Switzerland	Bern	Embassy	Ivan Trifunović, ambassador	Countries: Liechtenstein	
Switzerland	Zürich	Consulate-General	Mihajlo Šaulić, consul-general	Countries: Liechtenstein	
United Kingdom	London	Embassy	Goran Aleksić, ambassador	Countries: Ireland	
Ukraine	Kyiv	Embassy	Andon Sapundži, ambassador		
Oceania
Host country	Host city	Mission	Head of mission	Concurrent accreditation	References
Australia	Canberra	Embassy	Rade Stefanović, ambassador	Countries: Fiji; Kiribati; Nauru; New Zealand; Papua New Guinea; Samoa; Solomon Islands; Tonga; Tuvalu; Vanuatu	
Australia	Sydney	Consulate-General	Jakov Rogan, consul-general	Countries: Fiji; Kiribati; Nauru; New Zealand; Papua New Guinea; Samoa; Solomon Islands; Tonga; Tuvalu; Vanuatu	
International organisations
Host country	Host city	Mission	Head of mission	Concurrent accreditation	References
Council of Europe	Strasbourg	Permanent Mission	Suzana Grubješić, ambassador		
European Union	Brussels	Mission	Danijel Apostolović, ambassador		
NATO	Brussels	Mission	Branimir Filipović, ambassador		
United Nations	New York City	Permanent Mission	Radomir Ilić, chargé d'affaires		
United Nations	Geneva	Permanent Mission	Nikola Ratković, chargé d'affaires		
United Nations	Vienna	Permanent Mission	Žarko Obradović, ambassador	International Organizations: OSCE	
UNESCO	Paris	Permanent Delegation	Roksanda Ninčić, ambassador		

== Gallery ==
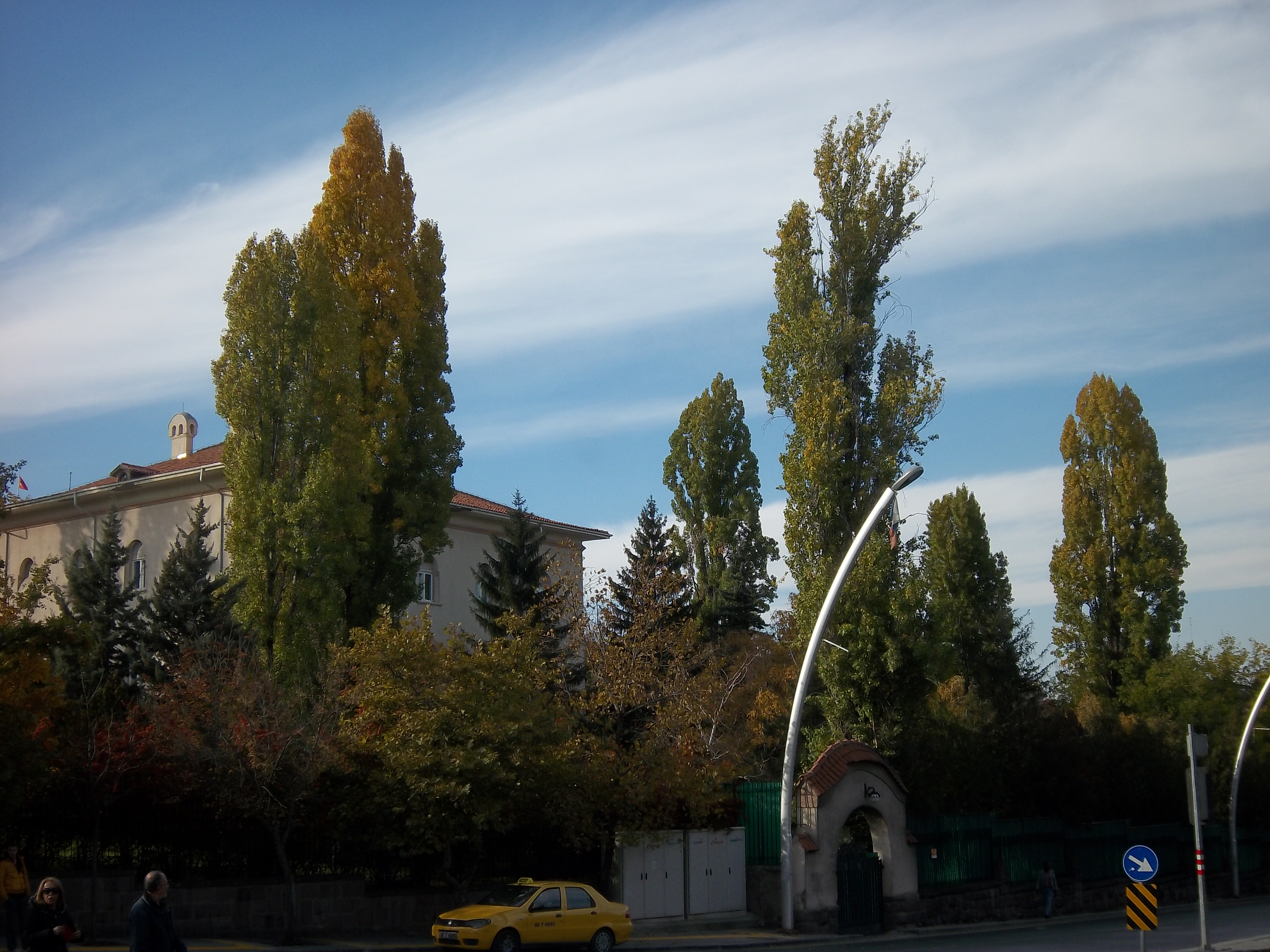
Embassy in Ankara

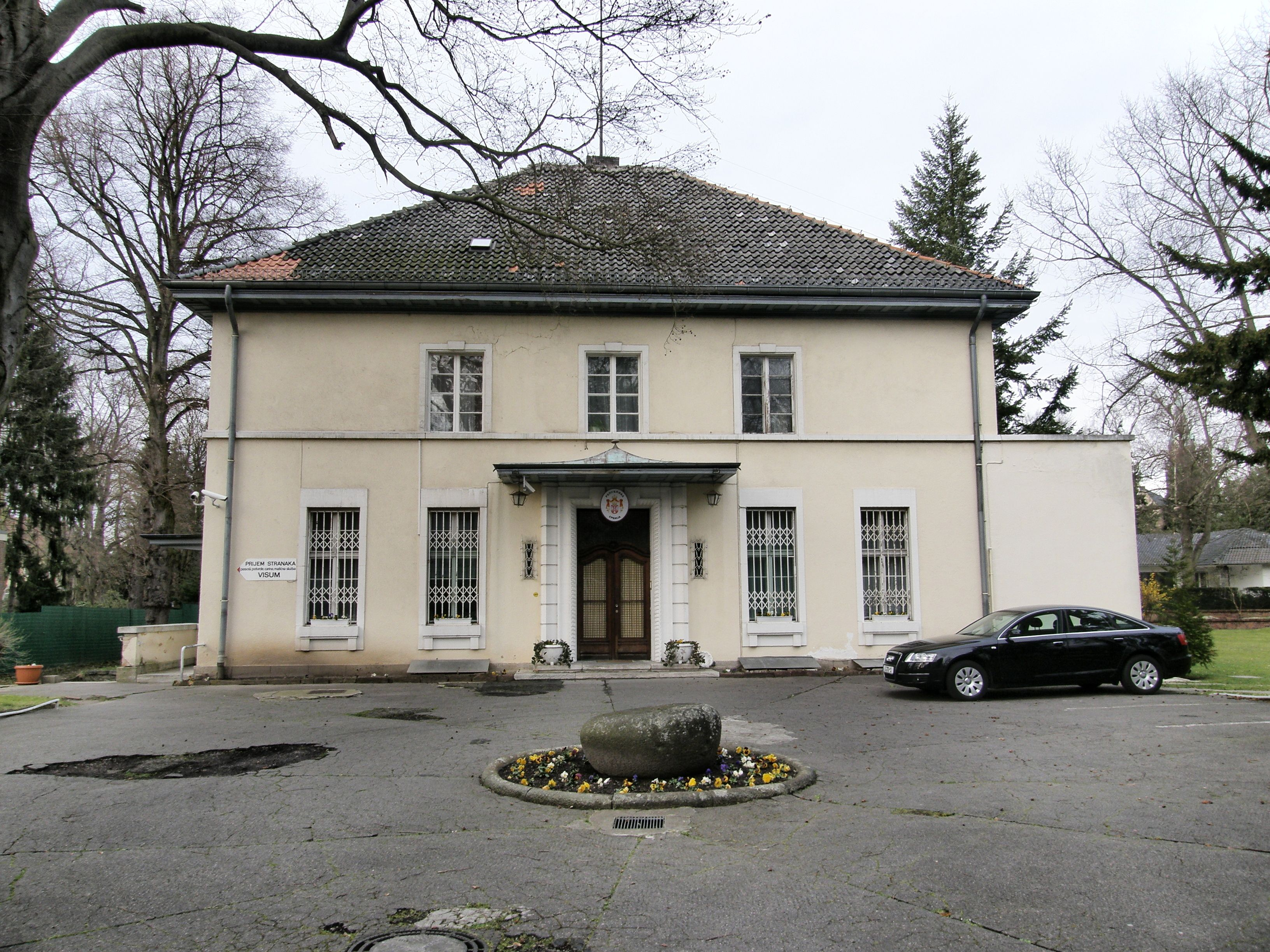
Embassy in Berlin

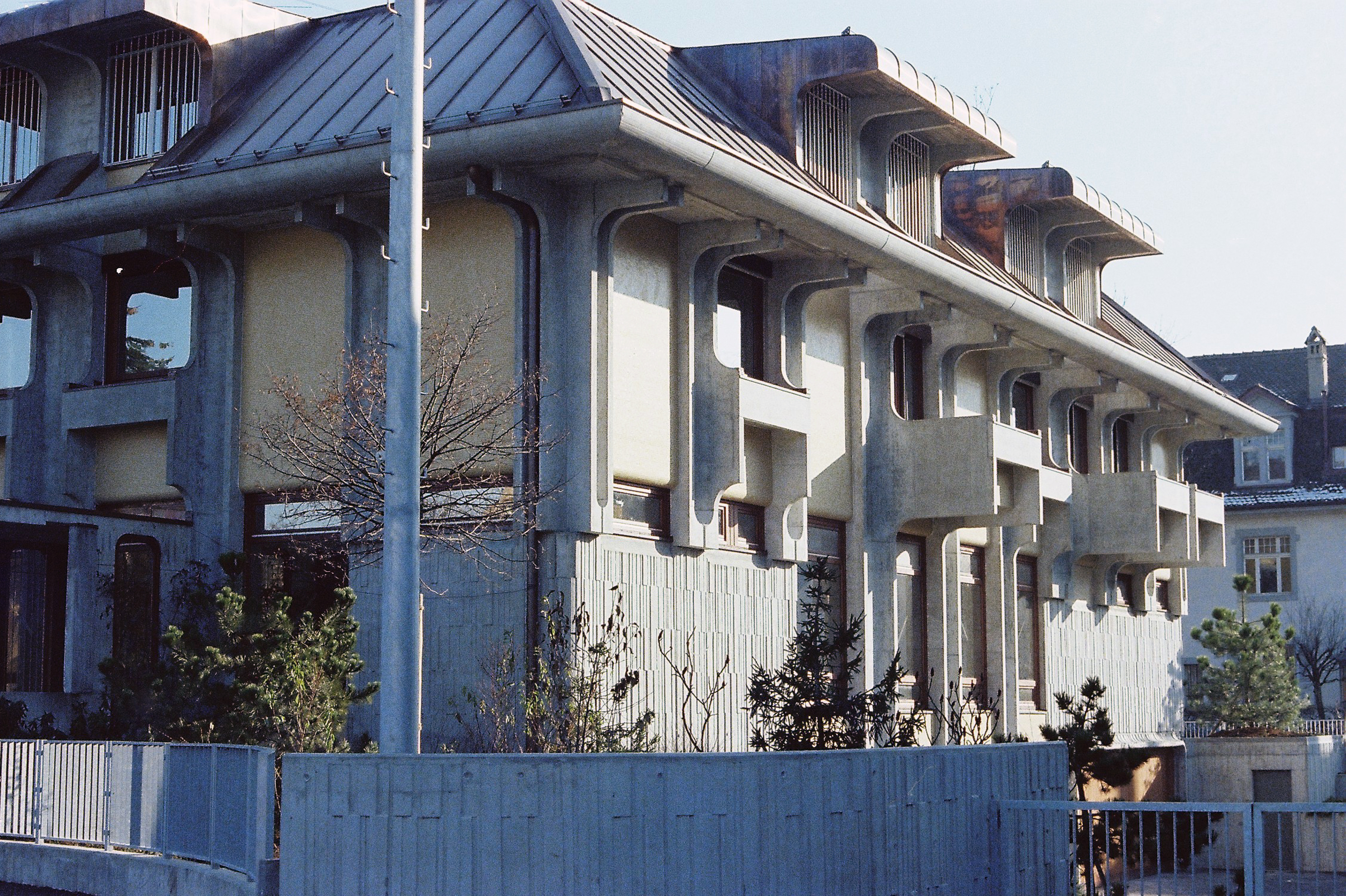
Embassy in Bern

Embassy in Bucharest

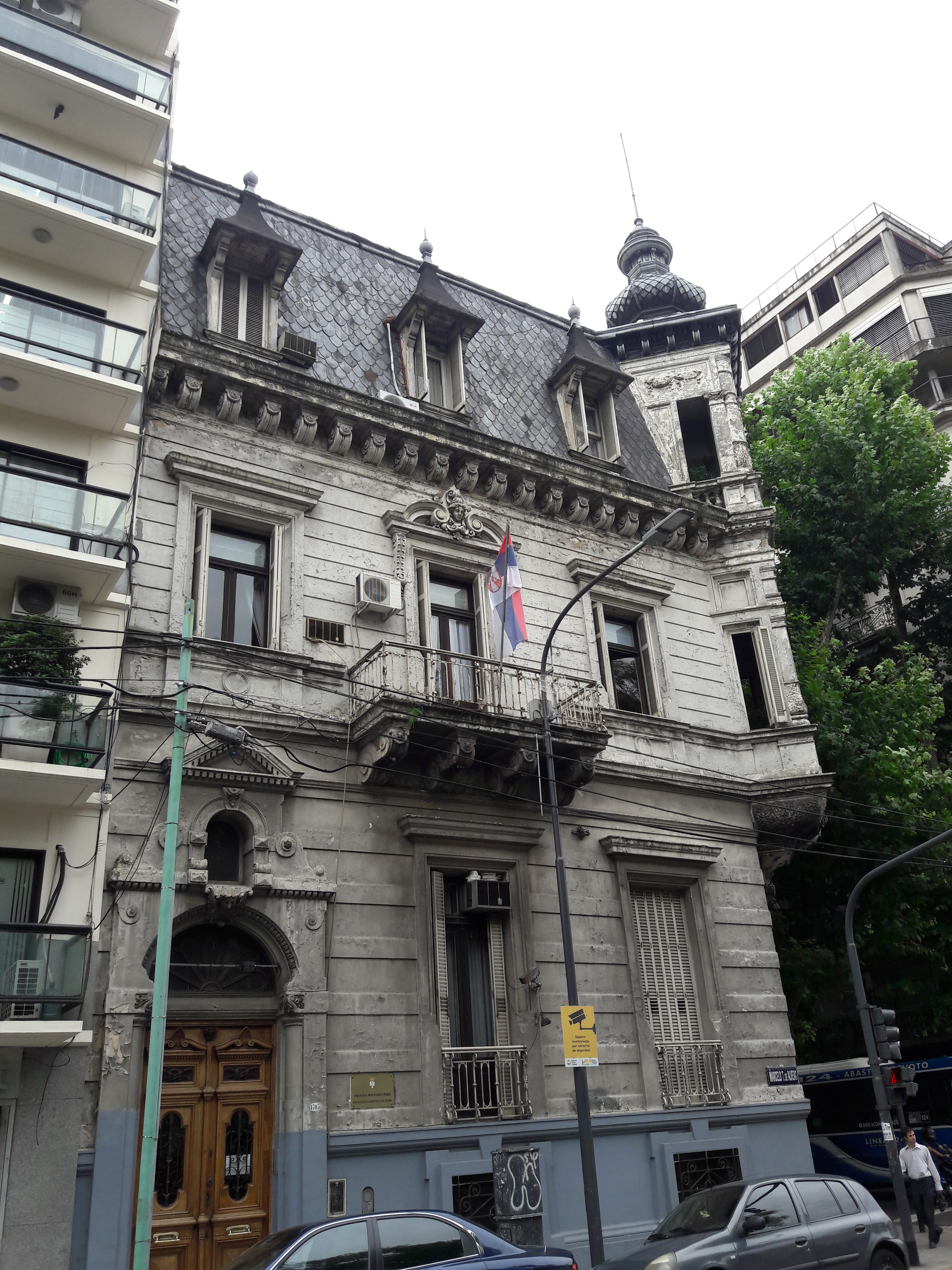
Embassy in Buenos Aires

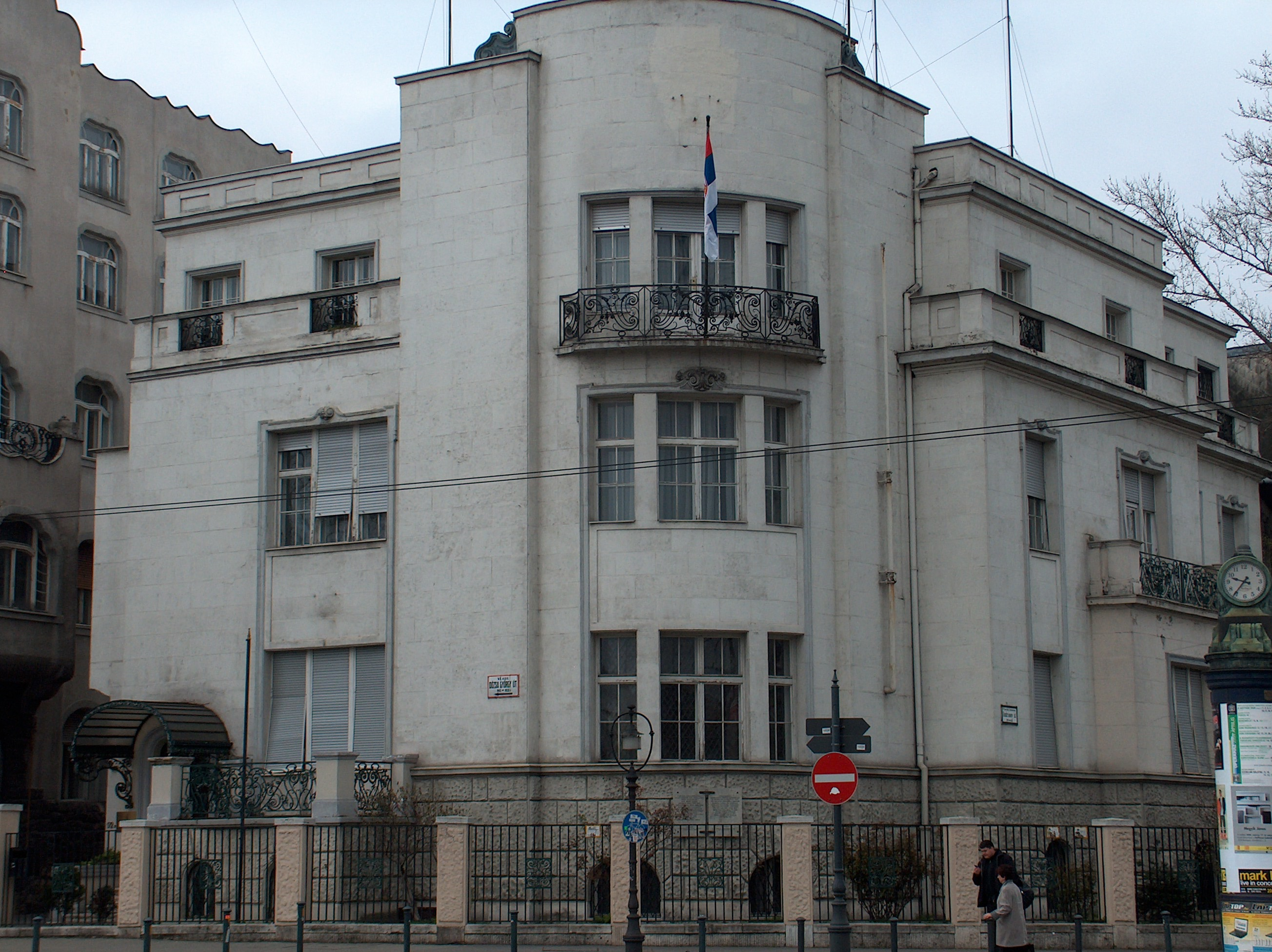
Embassy in Budapest

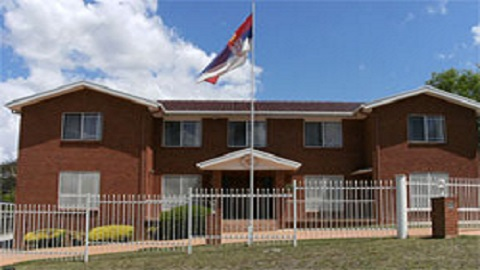
Embassy in Canberra

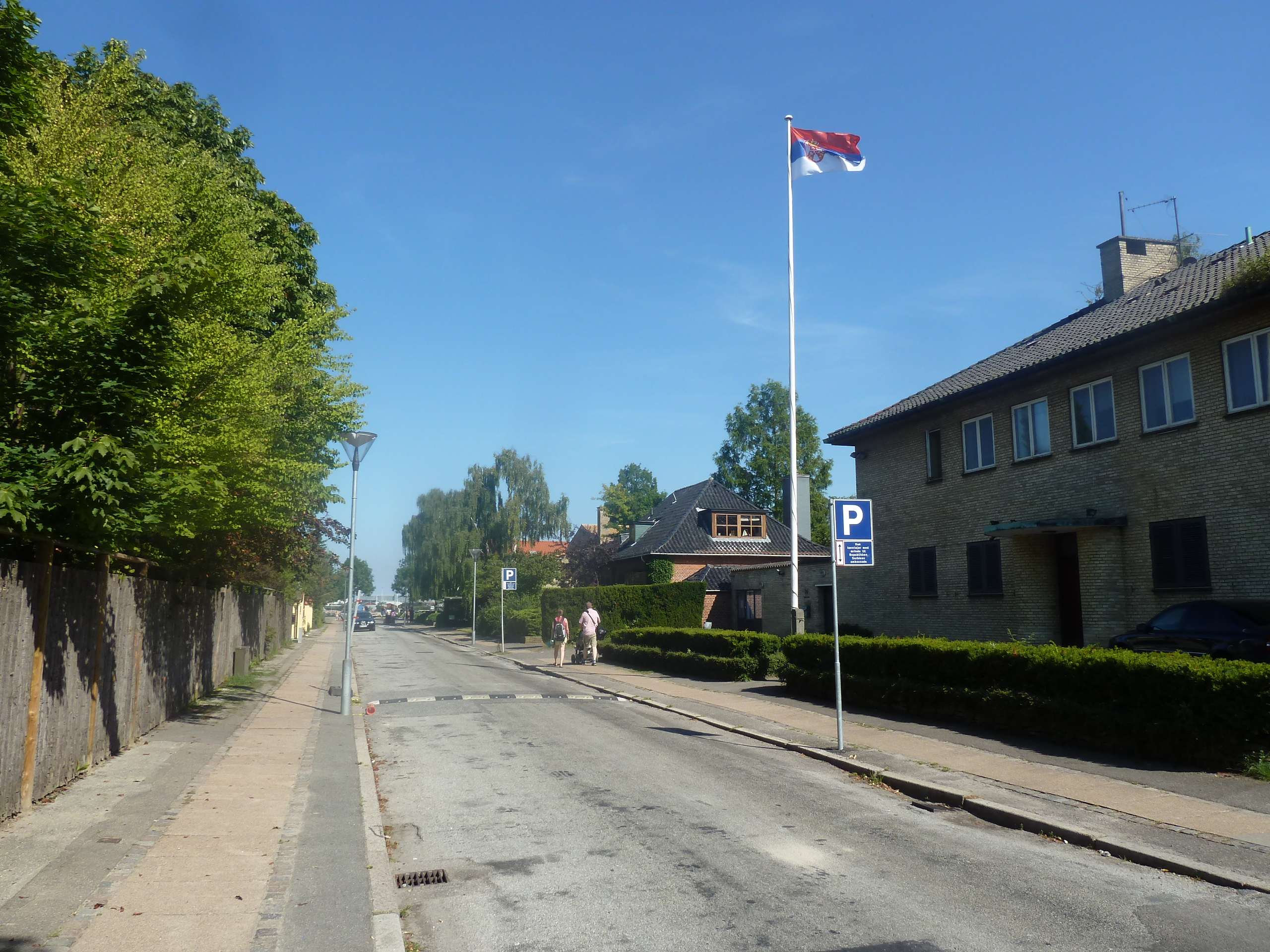
Embassy in Copenhagen

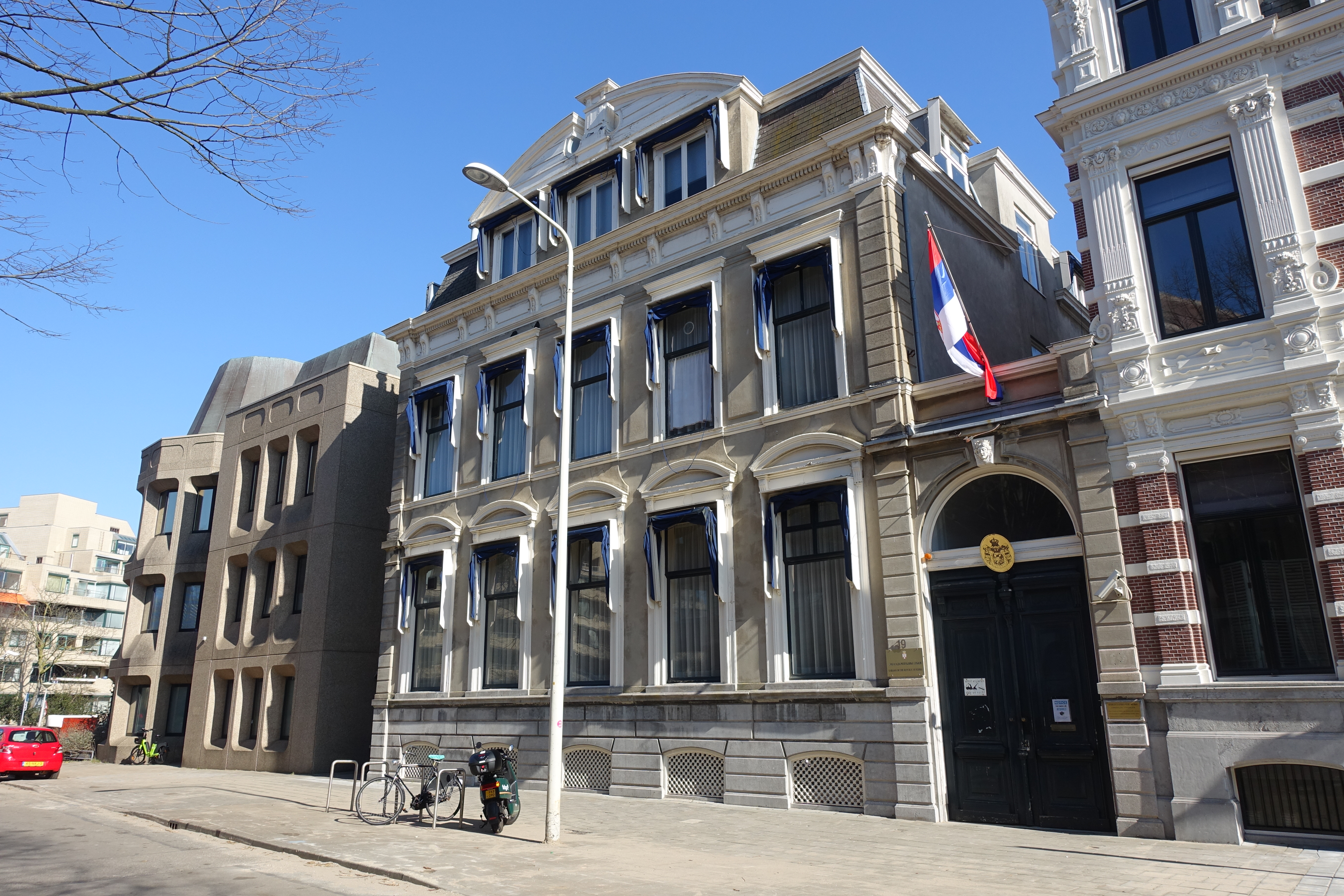
Embassy in The Hague

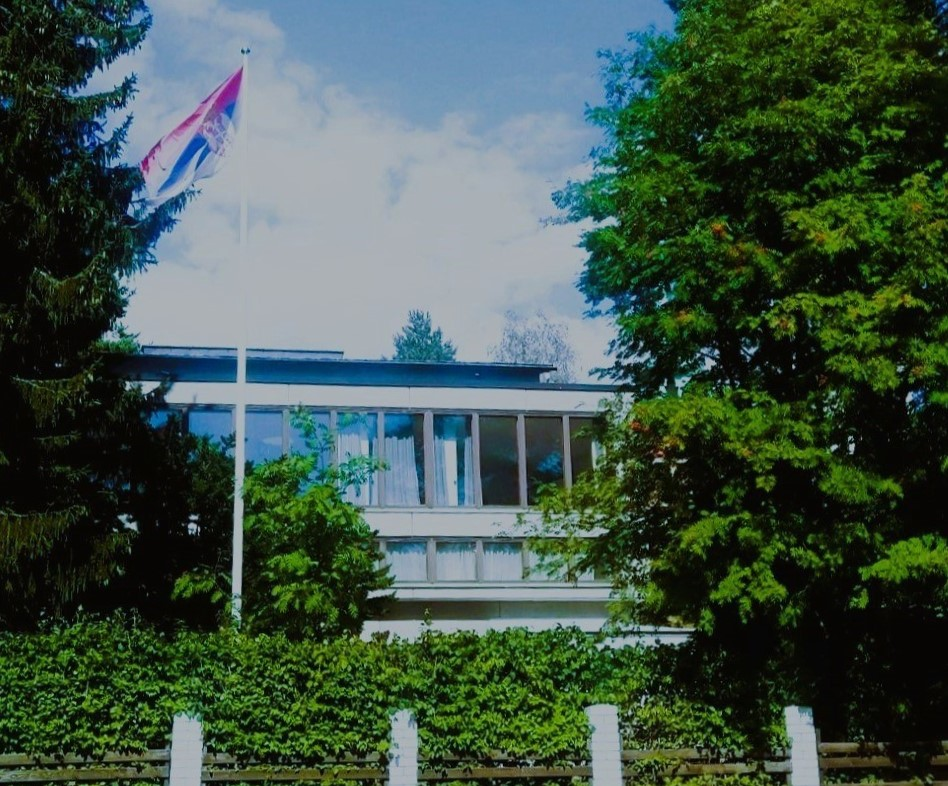
Embassy in Helsinki

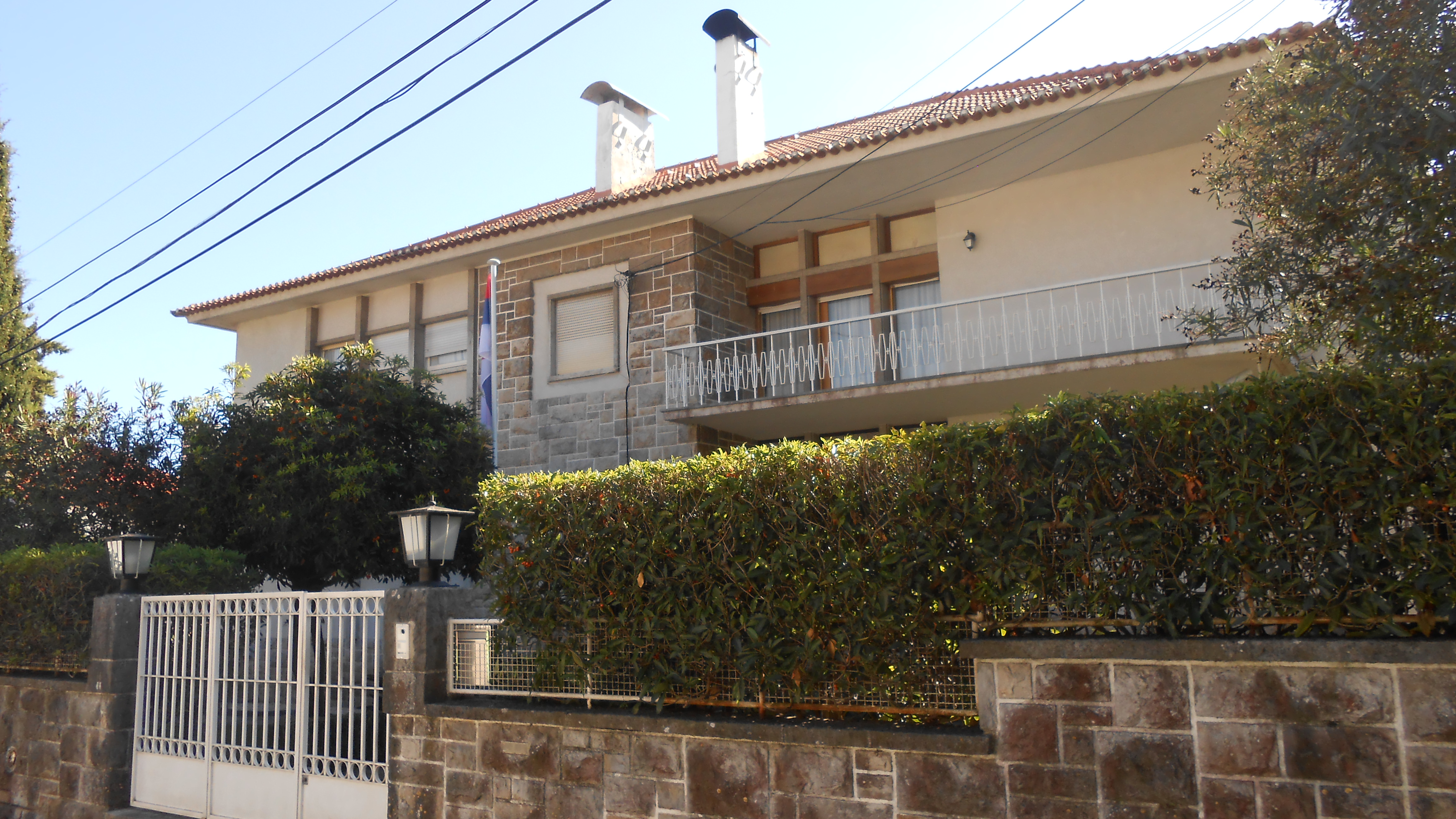
Embassy in Lisbon

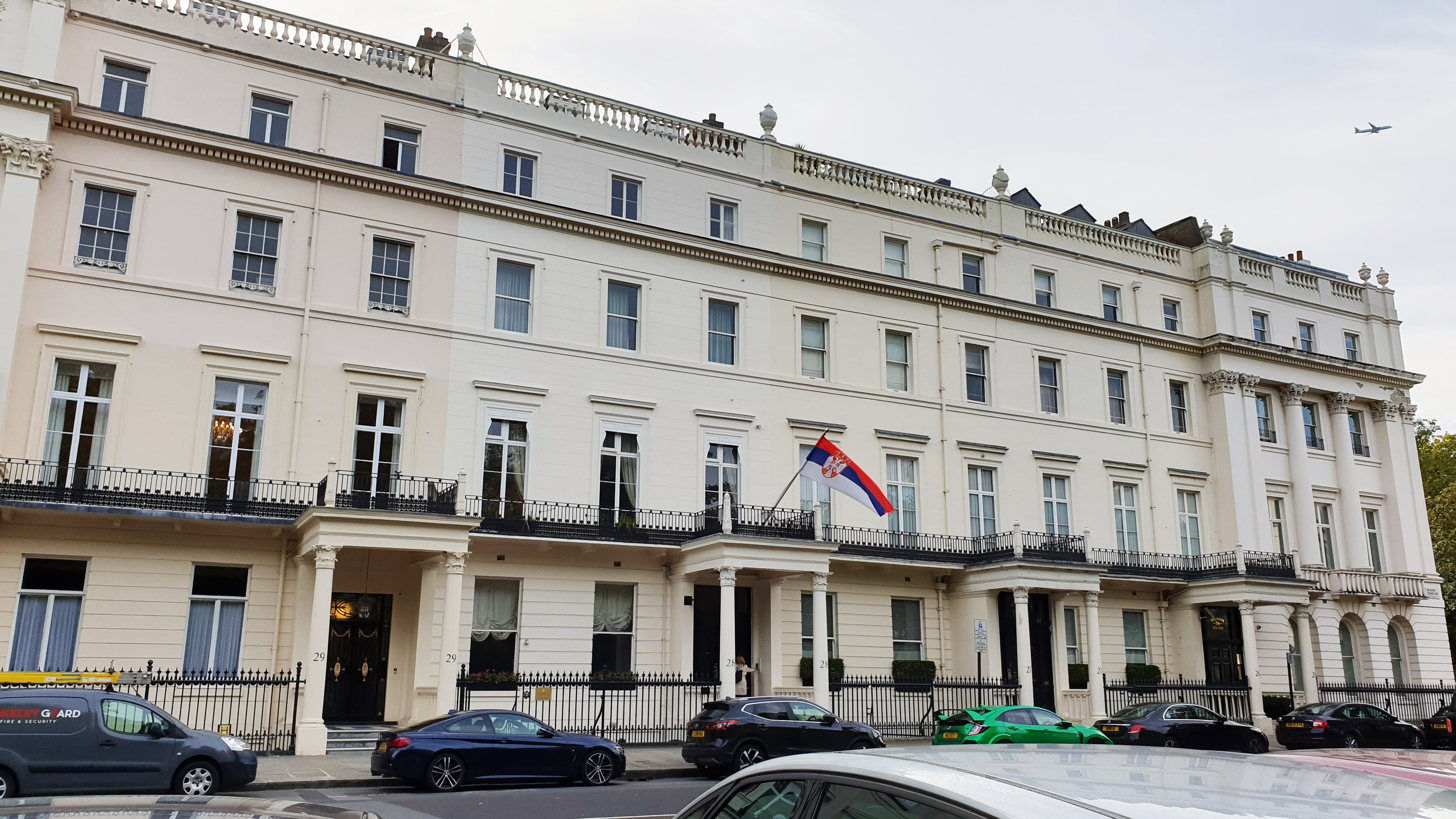
Embassy in London

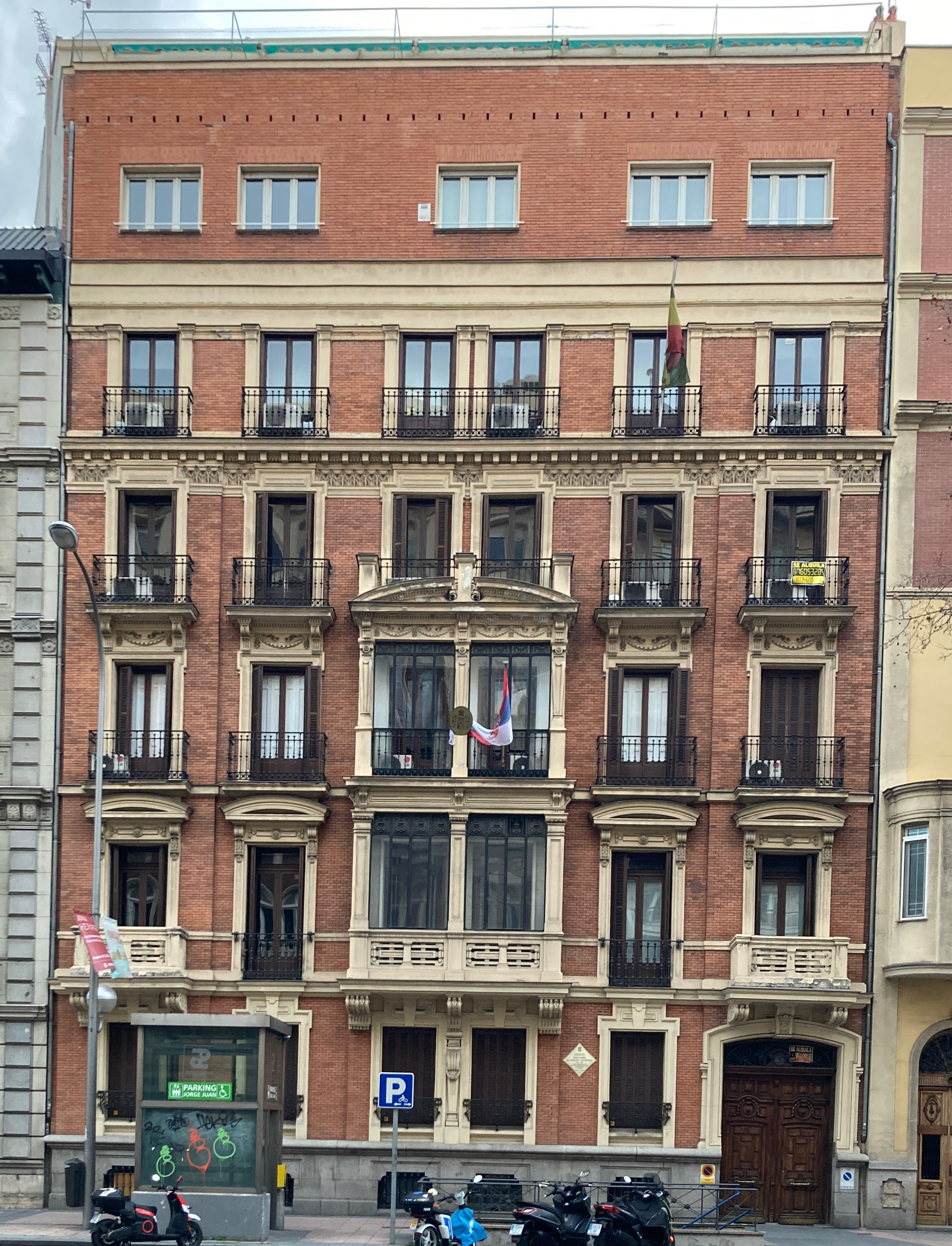
Embassy in Madrid

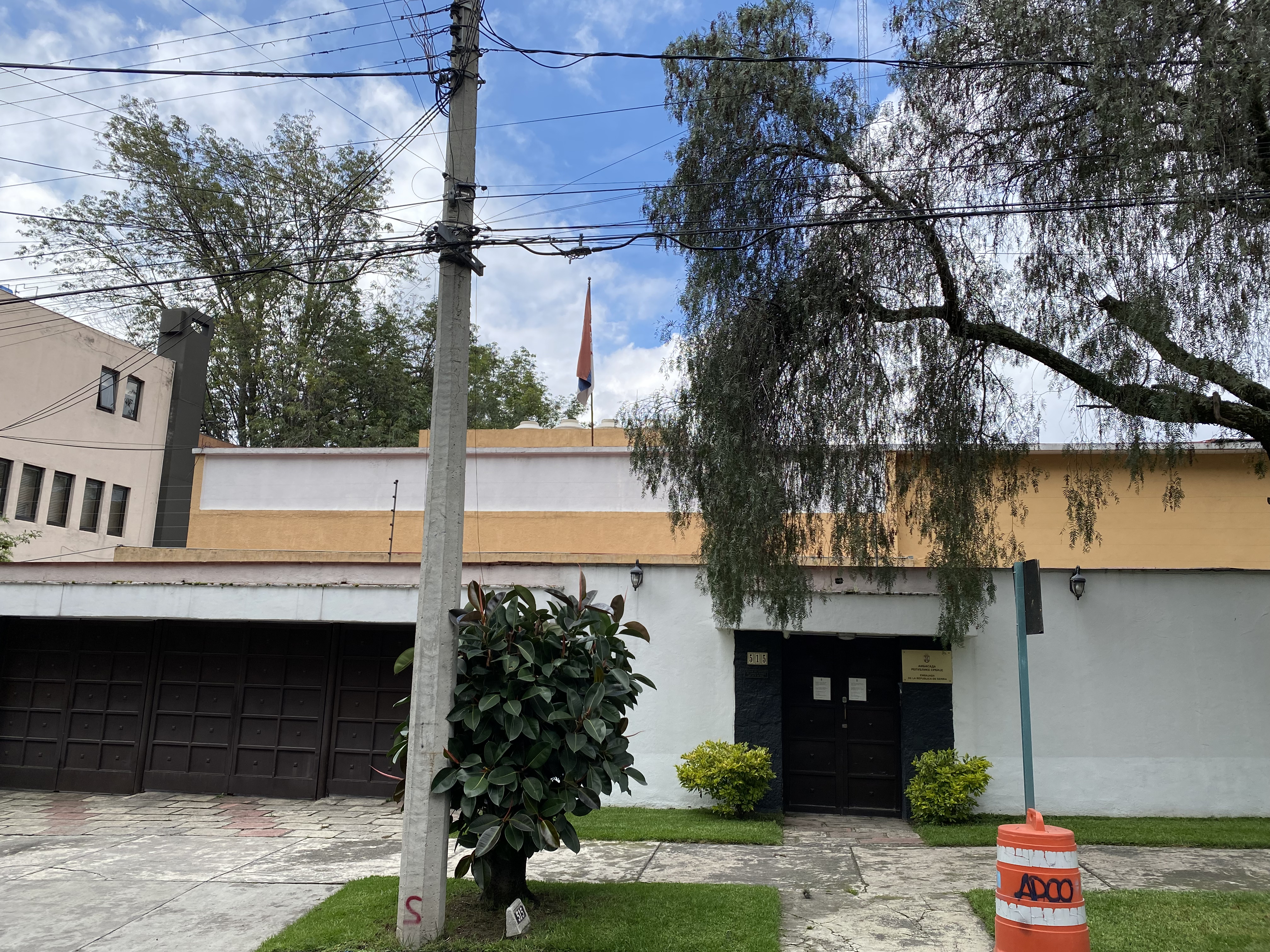
Embassy in Mexico City

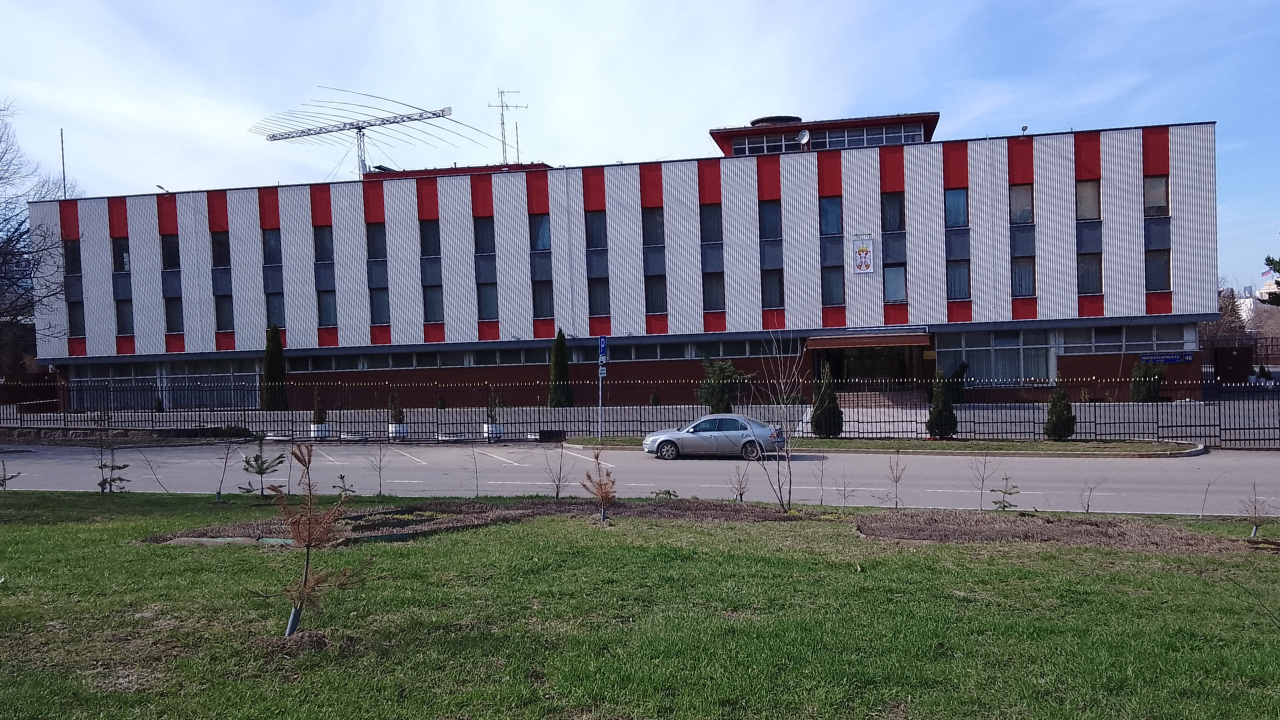
Embassy in Moscow

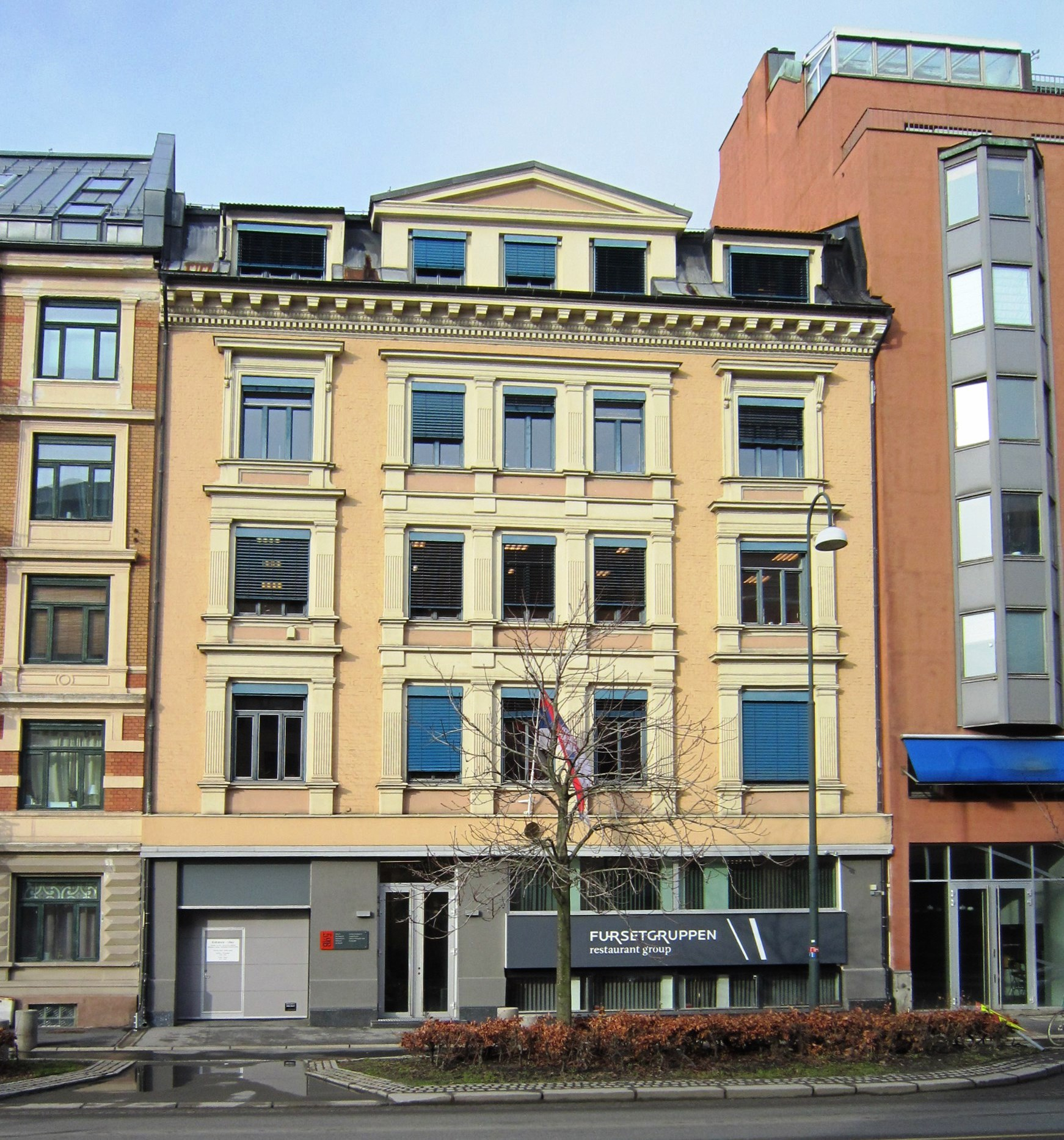
Embassy in Oslo

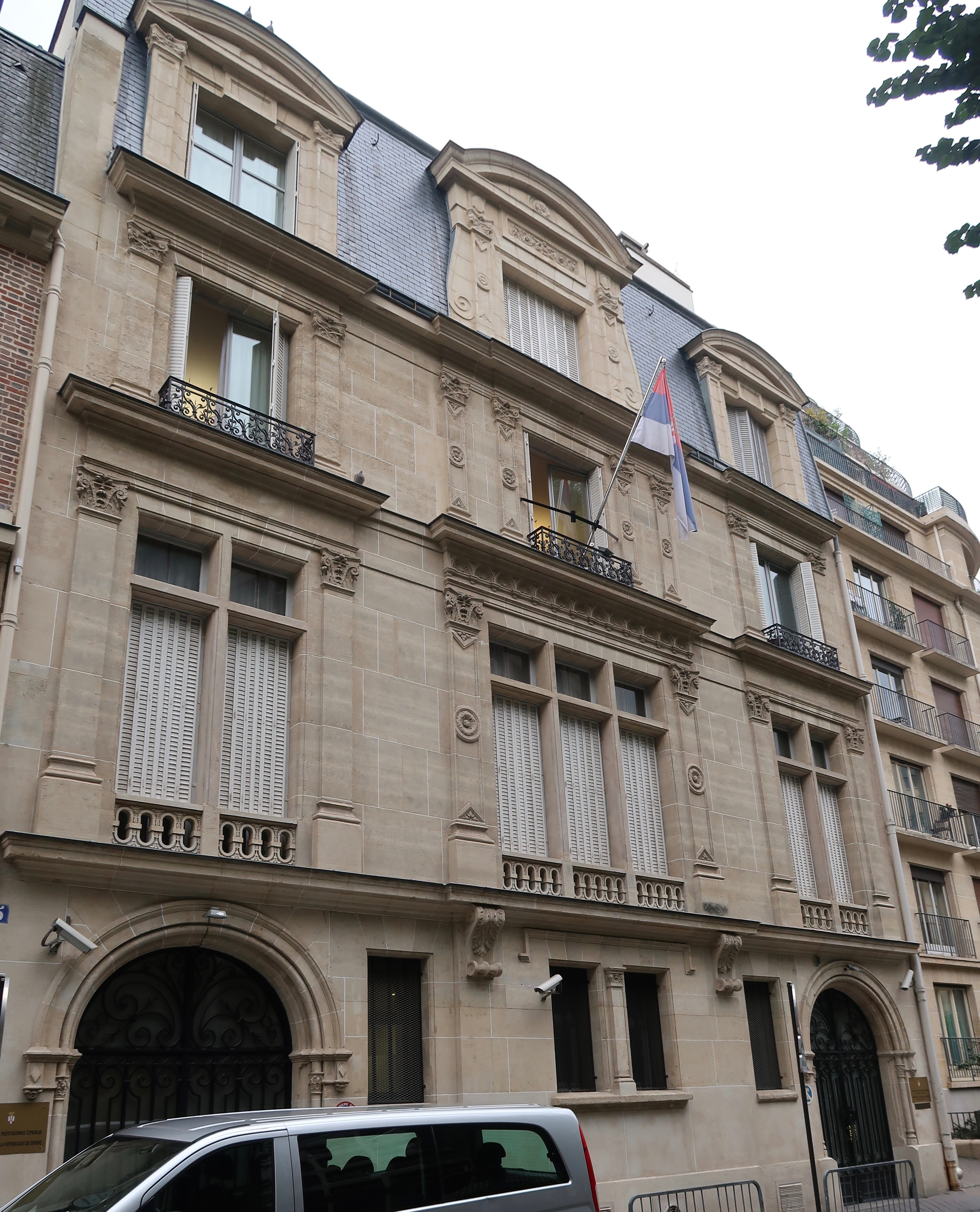
Embassy in Paris

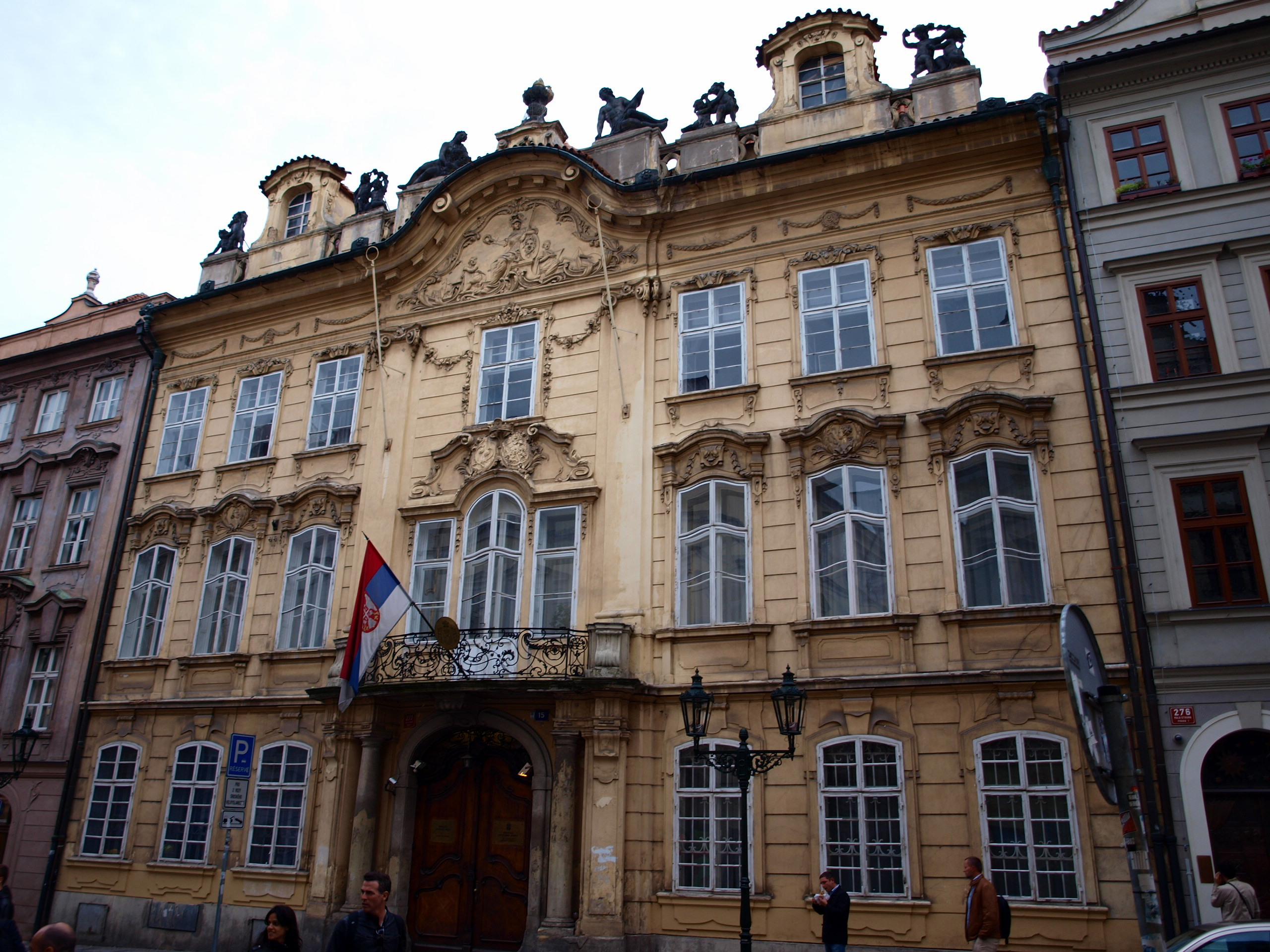
Embassy in Prague

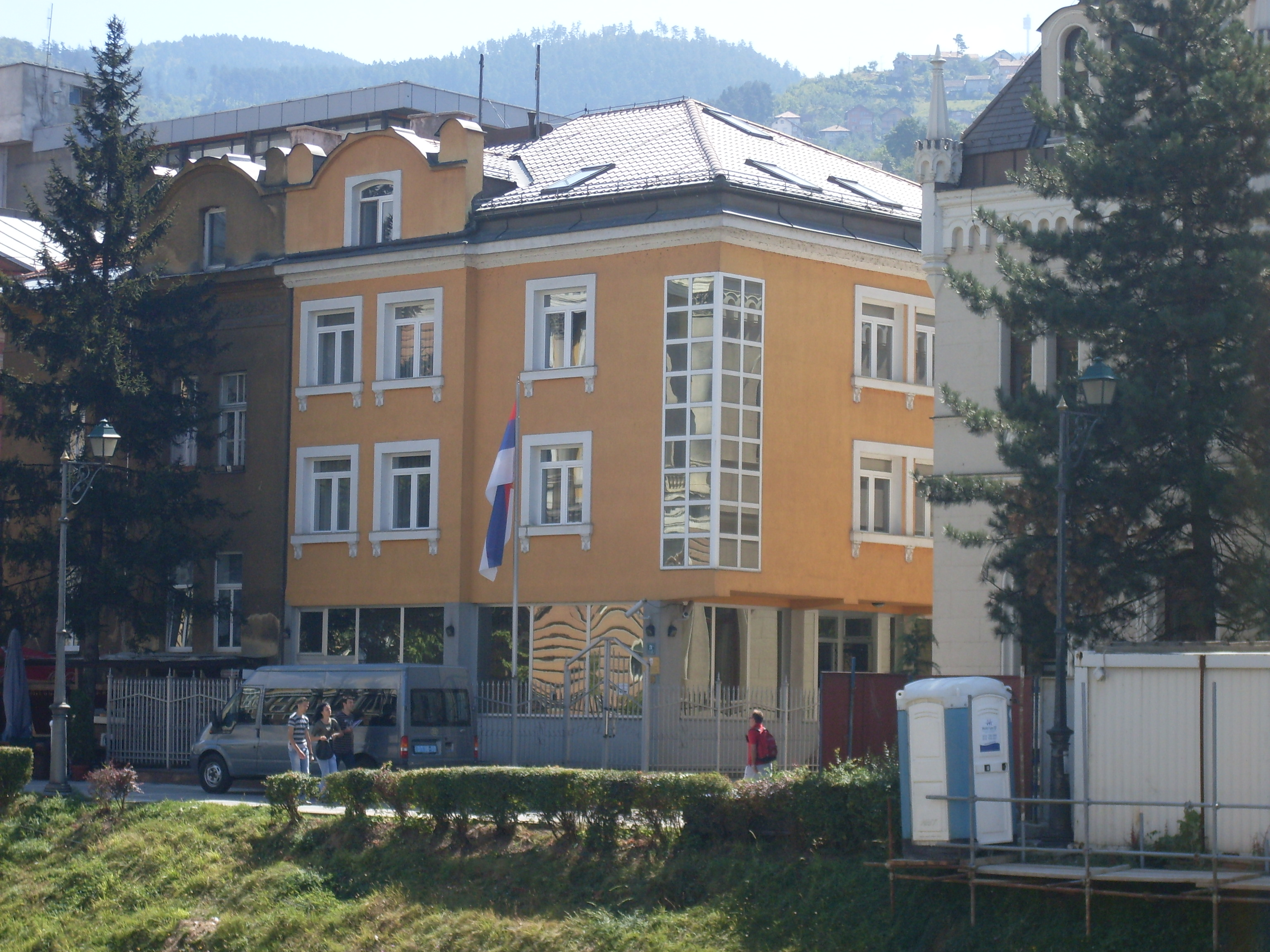
Embassy in Sarajevo

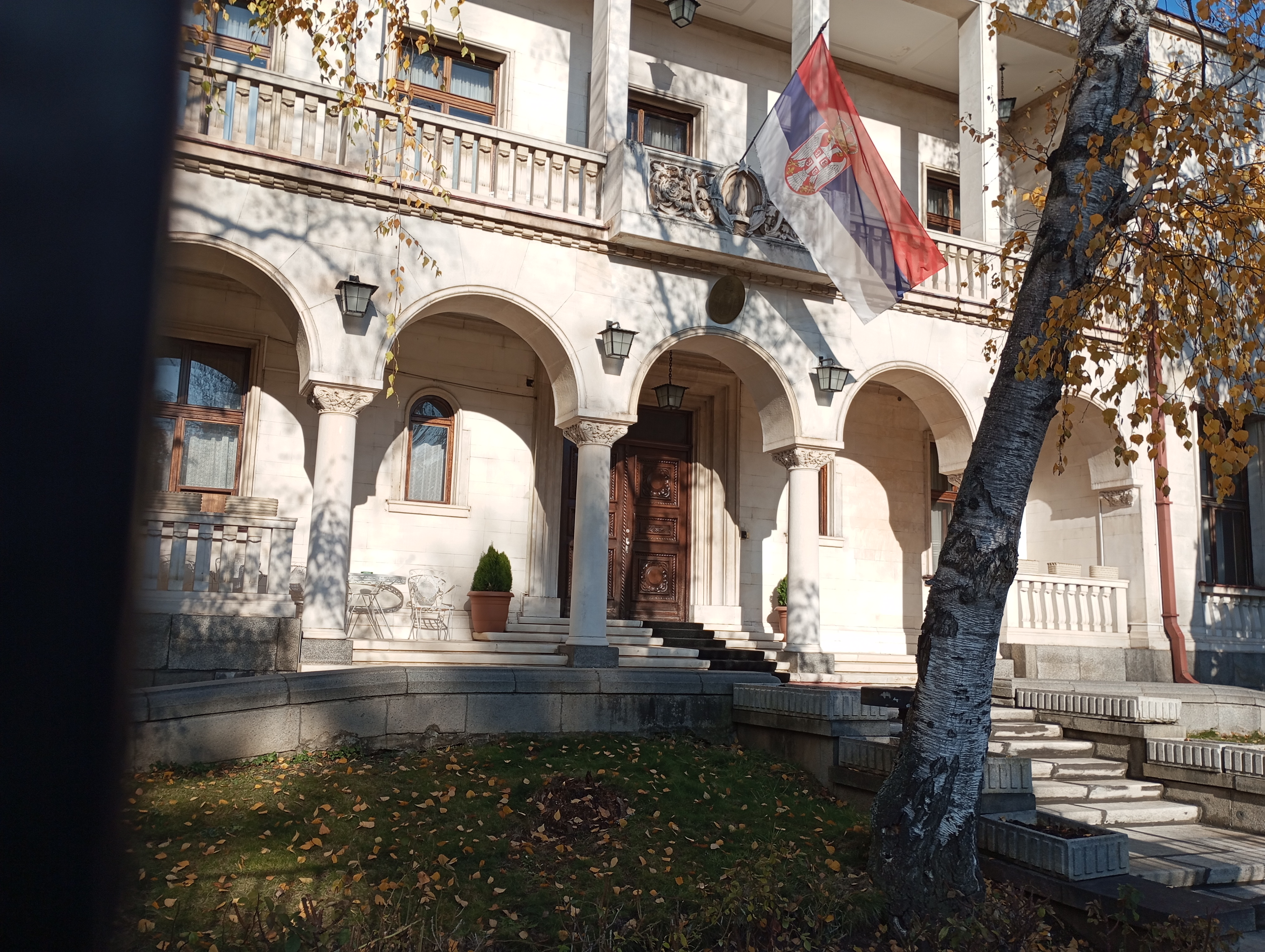
Embassy in Sofia

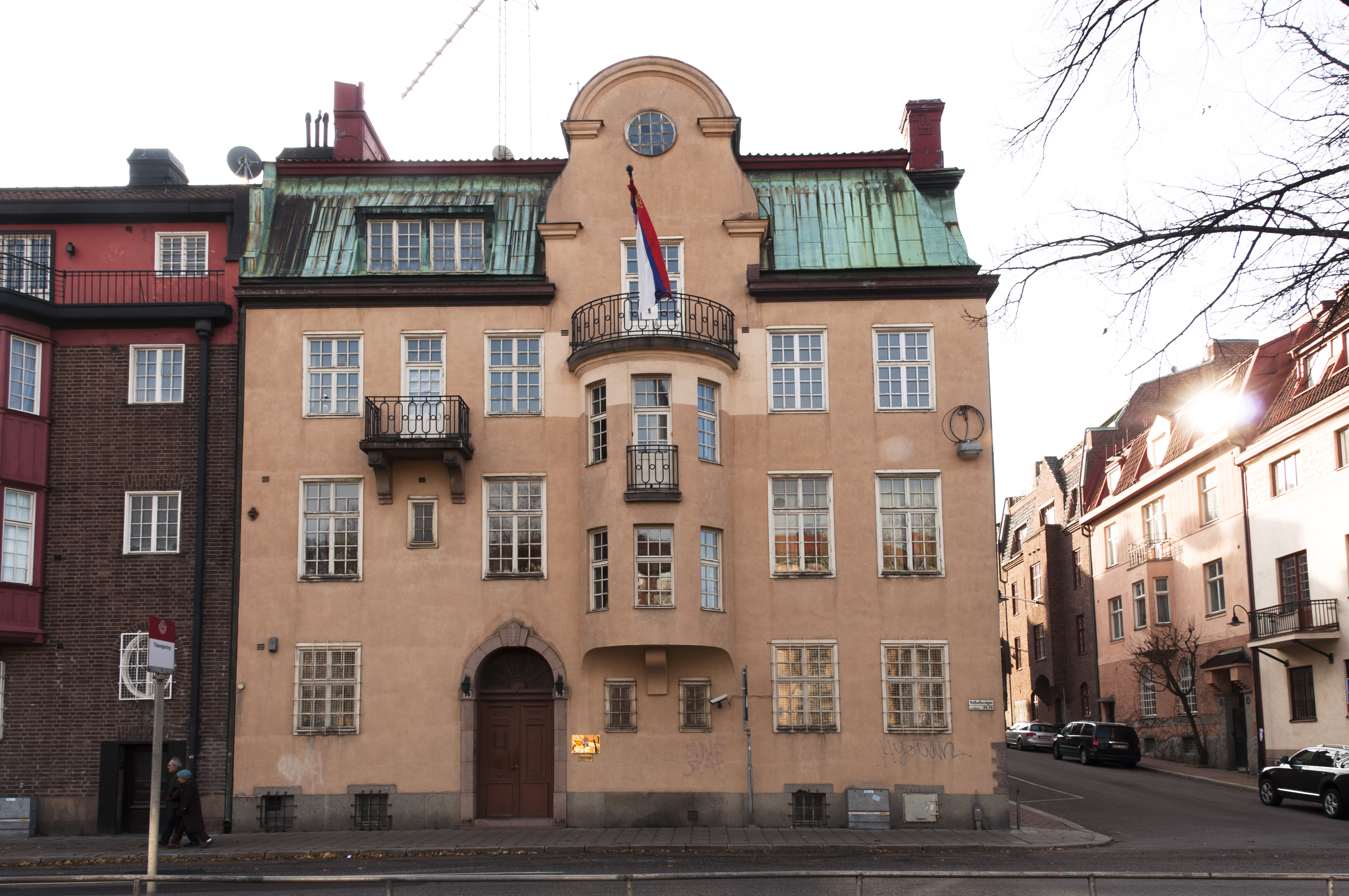
Embassy in Stockholm

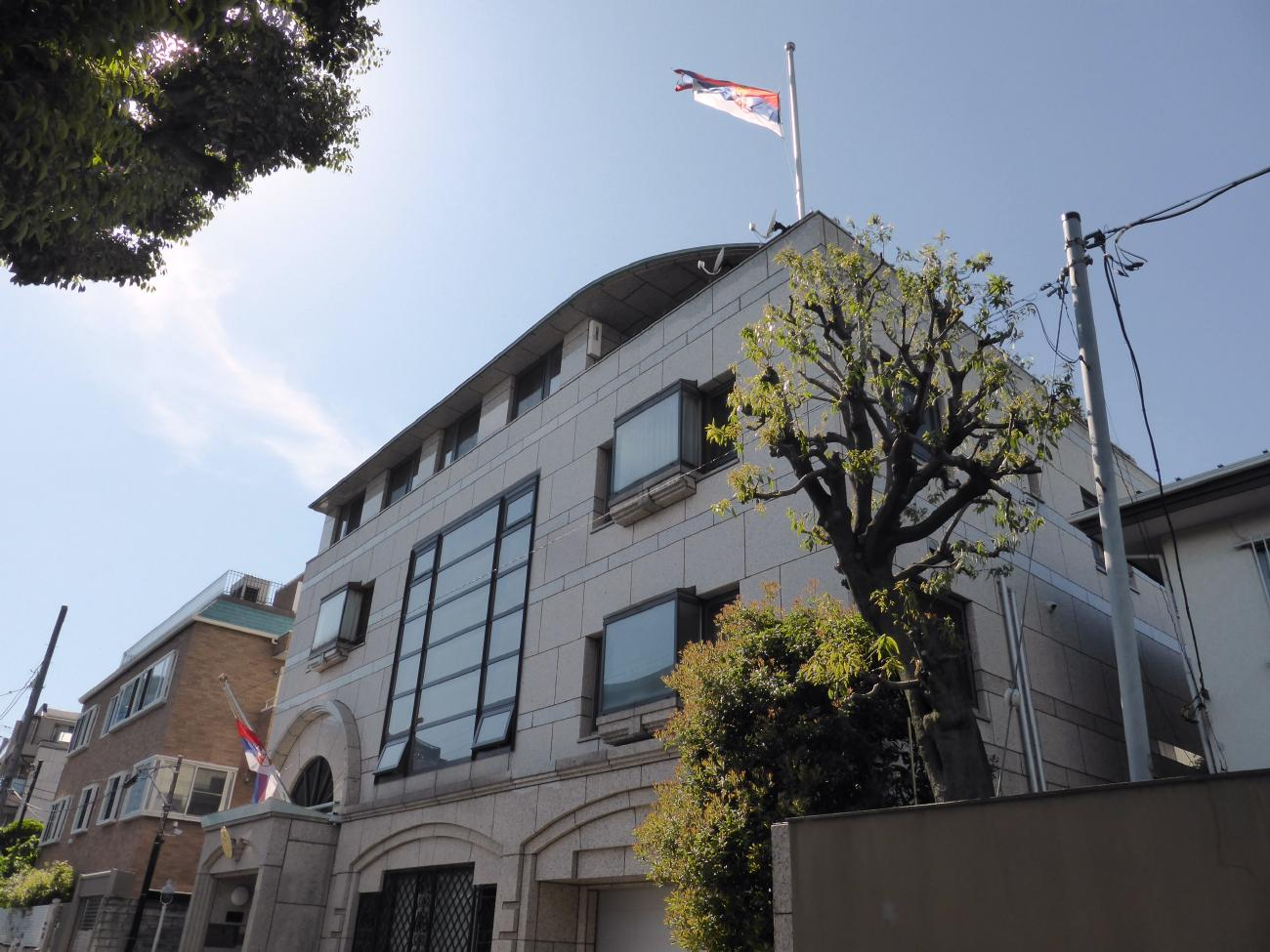
Embassy in Tokyo

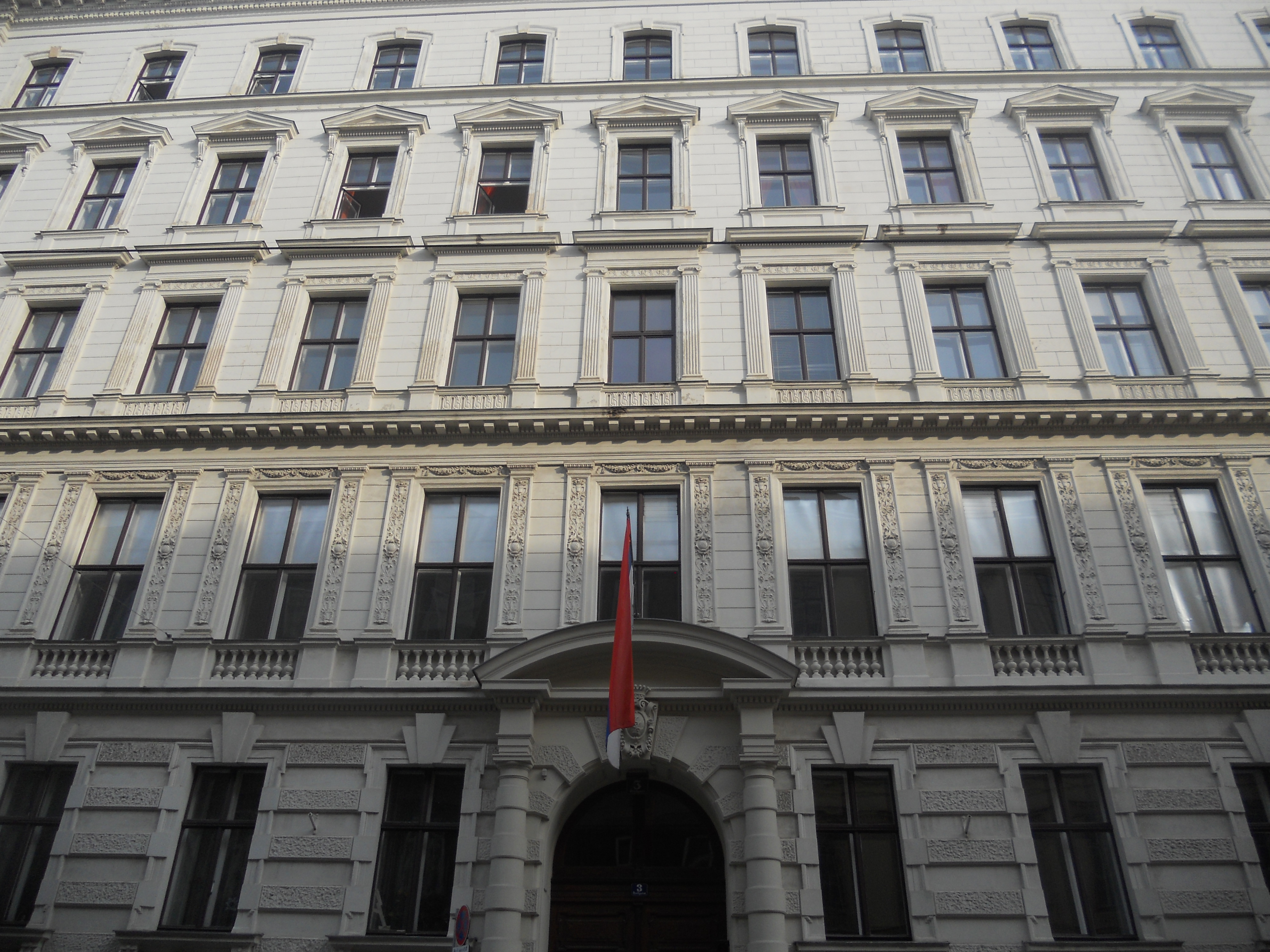
Embassy in Vienna

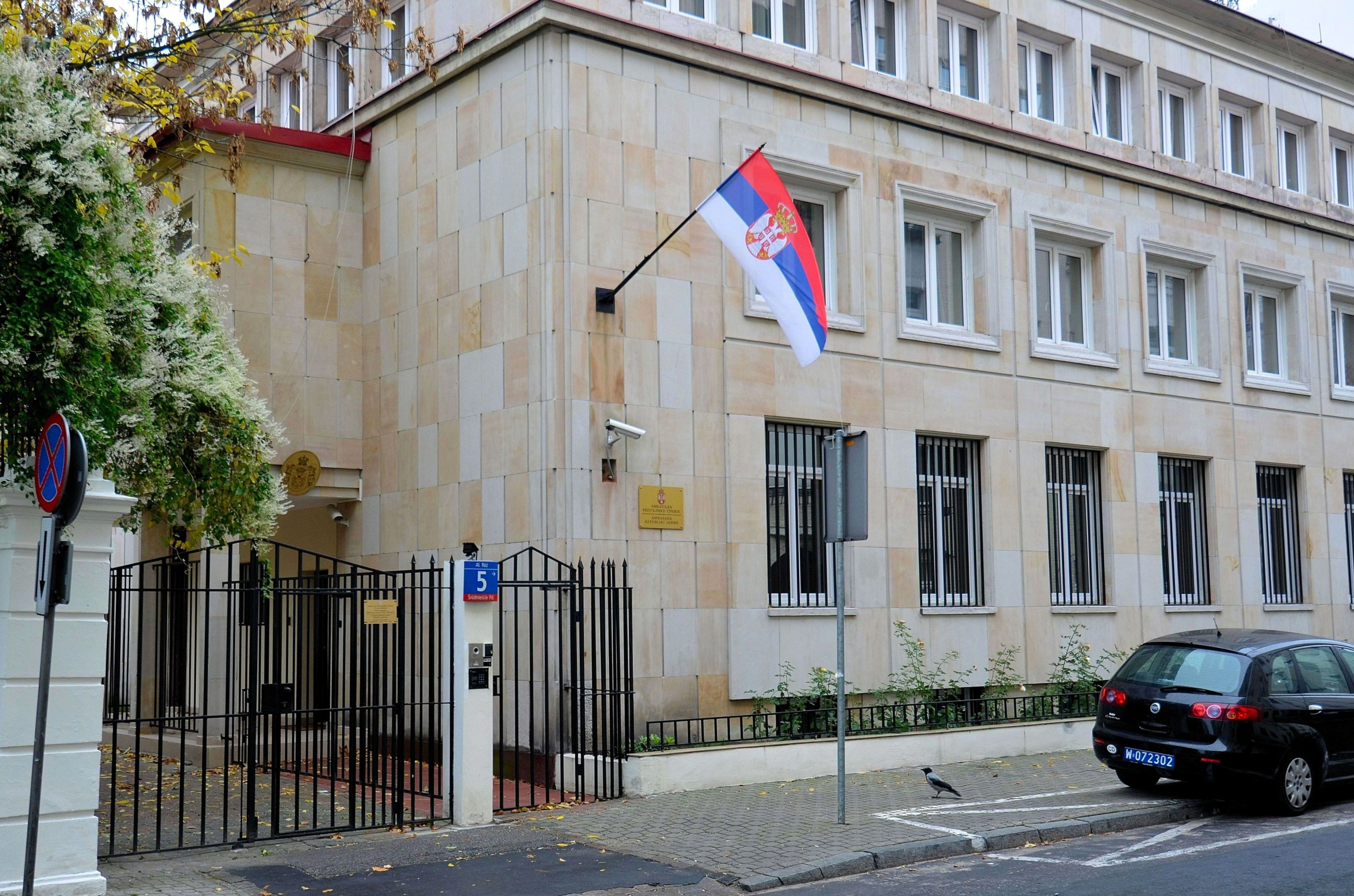
Embassy in Warsaw

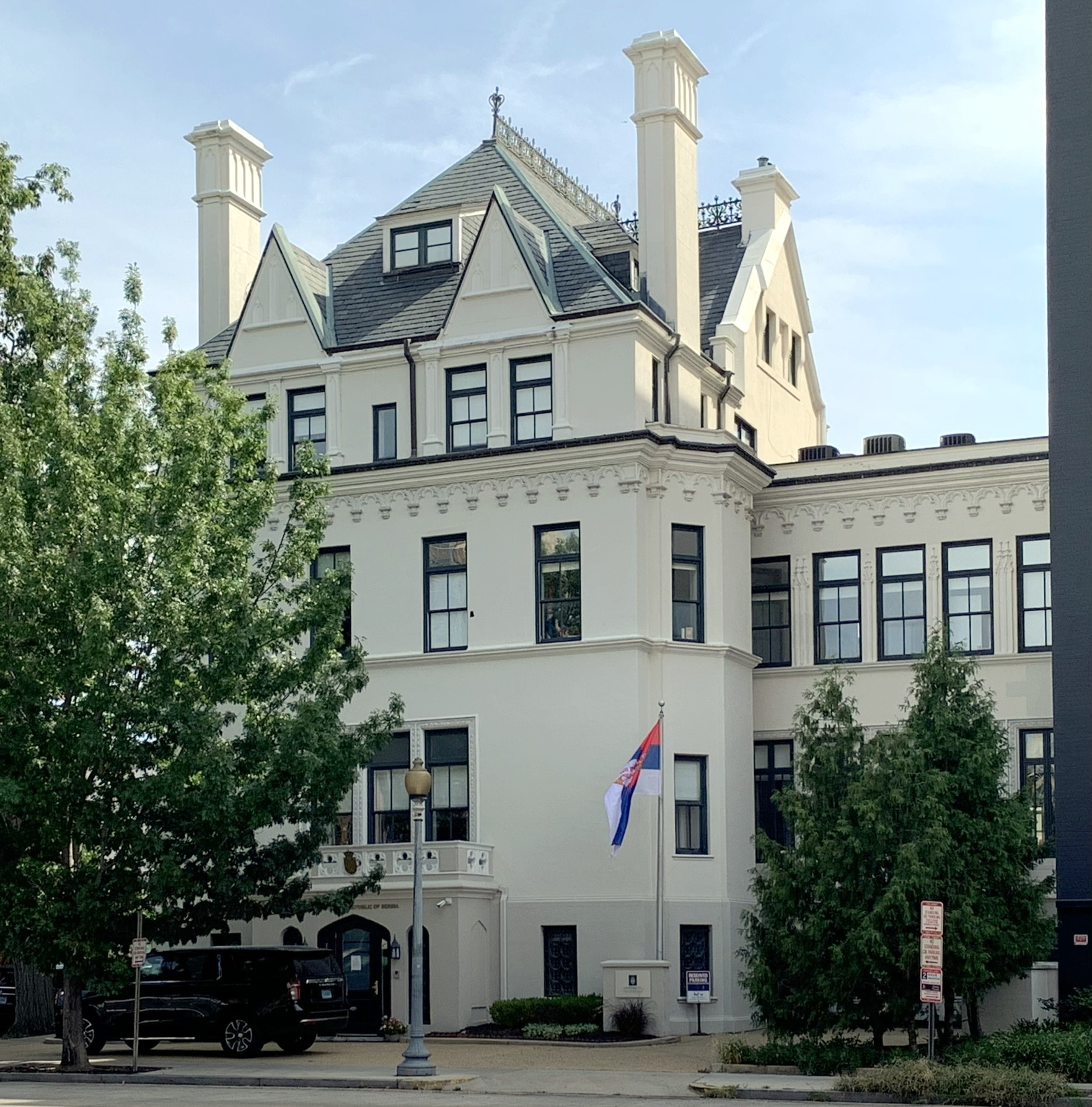
Embassy in Washington, D.C.

== Missions to open ==
Host country	Host city	Mission	Ref.
Jordan	Amman	Embassy	
Pakistan	Islamabad	Embassy	
United States	Miami	Consulate-General	
United States	San Francisco	Consulate-General	
Uzbekistan	Tashkent	Embassy	

== Closed missions ==
Host country	Host city	Mission	Year closed	Ref.
Colombia	Bogotá	Embassy	1992	
Guinea	Conakry	Embassy	2001	
Mongolia	Ulaanbaatar	Embassy		
North Korea	Pyongyang	Embassy	2001	
Pakistan	Islamabad	Embassy		
Tanzania	Dar es Salaam	Embassy	2001	
Thailand	Bangkok	Embassy		
Vietnam	Hanoi	Embassy	2002	
Austria	Graz	Consulate-General	2008	
Sweden	Malmö	Consulate-General	2008	

== See also ==
- List of diplomatic missions in Serbia
- Foreign relations of Serbia
- Visa policy of Serbia
