= Fakultet političkih nauka =

Fakultet političkih nauka (Faculty of Political Sciences in most South Slavic languages) may refer to:

- University of Montenegro Faculty of Political Sciences, a university in Podgorica
- University of Belgrade Faculty of Political Sciences
