= SEIO =

SEIO may refer to:

- Seioglobal, a Chinese technology company
- The Spanish Society of Statistics and Operations Research (Spanish: Sociedad de Estadística e Investigación Operativa, SEIO)
- The Serbian European Integration Office, a coordination body of the Government of Serbia
