= Nemanja Starović =

Serbian politician (born 1982)

- Немања Старовић
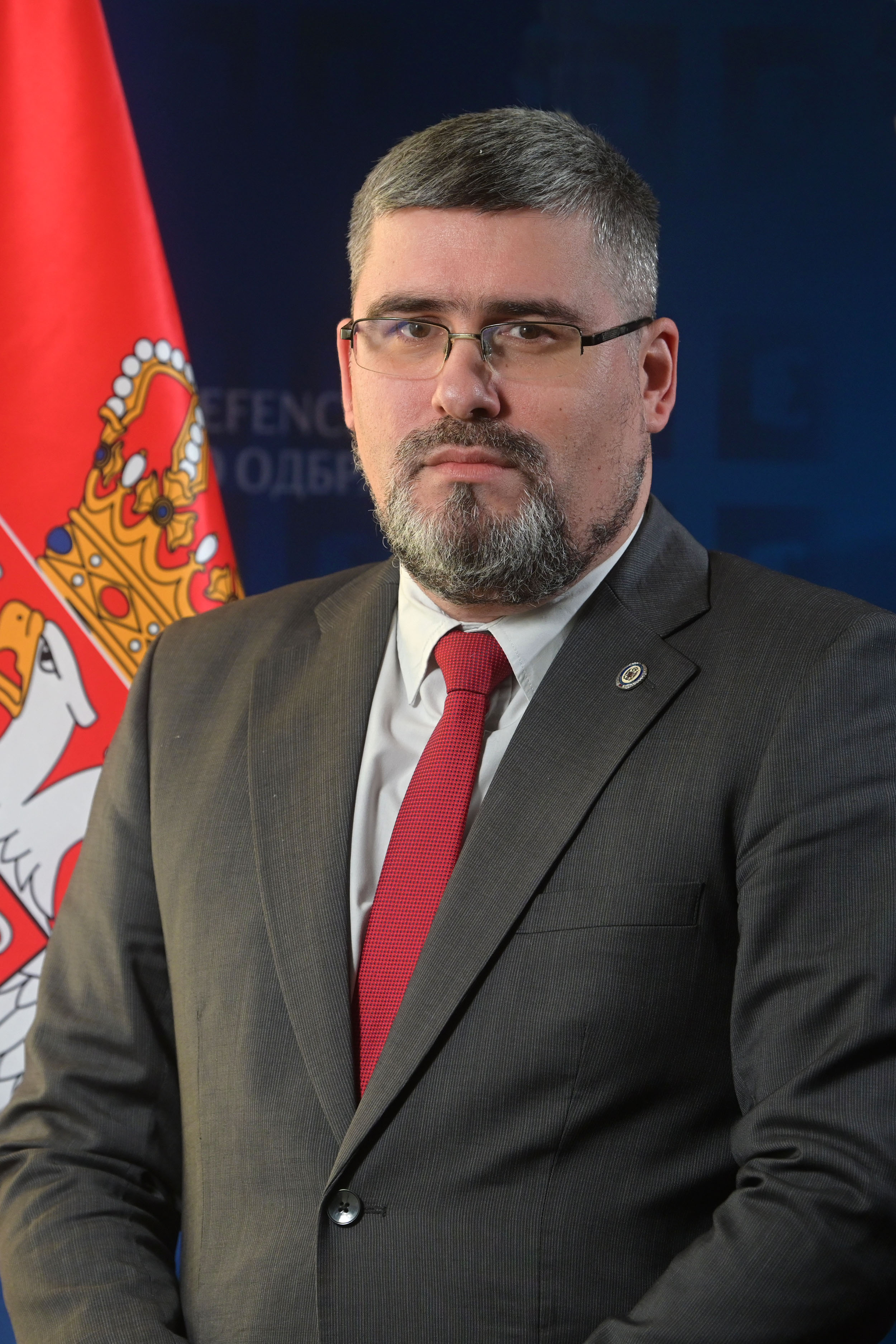
- Starović in 2024

Minister of European Integration
- Incumbent
- Assumed office 16 April 2025
- Prime Minister: Đuro Macut
- Preceded by: Tanja Miščević

Minister of Labour, Employment, Veteran and Social Policy
- In office 2 May 2024 – 16 April 2025
- Prime Minister: Miloš Vučević
- Preceded by: Nikola Selaković
- Succeeded by: Milica Đurđević Stamenkovski

Personal details
- Born: 9 May 1982 (age 44) Novi Sad, Yugoslavia
- Party: Serbian Progressive Party
- Education: University of Novi Sad, Faculty of Philosophy

Nemanja Starović (Serbian: Немања Старовић; born 9 May 1982) is a Serbian politician who served as minister of European Integration since 2025. He was previously the minister of labour, employment, veteran and social policy from 2024 to 2025. From 2022 to 2024, he served as state secretary of the Ministry of Defense. From 2021 to 2022, he served as state secretary of the Ministry of Foreign Affairs.
