= Ljubodrag Miščević =

Serbian politician (born 1960)

Ljubodrag Miščević (Serbian Cyrillic: Љубодраг Мишчевић; born 1960) is a politician in Serbia. He has served in the Assembly of Vojvodina since 2016 as a member of the Serbian Progressive Party.

== Private career ==
Miščević is a geography professor. He lives in Novi Sad.

== Politician ==
Miščevic was a candidate for the National Assembly of Serbia in the 2008 parliamentary election, appearing in the twenty-first position on Milan Paroški's People's Movement for Serbia electoral list. The list did not cross the electoral threshold to win representation in the assembly.

Miščević subsequently joined the Progressive Party. He was given the forty-fifth position on the party's list in the 2016 Vojvodina provincial election and was elected when the list won a majority victory with sixty-three out of 120 mandates. In his first term, he served as deputy chair of the committee on urban and spatial planning and environmental protection. He also served on the presidency of the informal green parliamentary group.

He was promoted to the thirty-eighth position on the Progressive-led Aleksandar Vučić — For Our Children list in the 2020 provincial election and was re-elected when the list won an increased majority with seventy-six mandates. He is now the chair of the committee on urban and spatial planning and environmental protection and a member of the committee on administrative and mandatory issues.
