= European Integration Office =

- Канцеларија за европске интеграције Kancelarija za evropske integracije

Office overview
- Formed: 14 March 2004
- Dissolved: 29 June 2017
- Superseding Office: Ministry of European Integration
- Jurisdiction: Government of Serbia
- Headquarters: Nemanjina Street 34, Belgrade, Serbia
- Website: www.seio.gov.rs

The European integration office (Serbian: Канцеларија за европске интеграције / Kancelarija za evropske integracije) was a coordination body of the Government of Serbia.

It was constituted on 14 March 2004 and dissolved on 29 June 2017 when the Ministry of European Integration was formed.

== Organization and jurisdiction ==
The director in charge of the Office, had been appointed by the Government of Serbia on mandate of five years.

The jurisdiction of the Office was established by its statute:

- Strategy for association with and accession to the European Union;
- Monitoring and participating in preparations and negotiations for conclusion of the Stabilisation and Association Agreement with the European Union, implementation of the Stabilisation and Association Agreement and European Union accession;
- Strategy, stimulating and screening the harmonization of regulations of the Republic of Serbia with the European Union regulations and standards, as well as information of the European Union and the public thereupon;
- Coordination of translation of the European Union priority regulations into Serbian and coordination of translation of Serbian legislation into English language;
- Assistance to ministries and special organizations in the process of legal harmonisation with the European Union regulations;
- Monitoring the realization of obligations of ministries and special organizations in the process of European Union association and accession;
- Harmonisation of Serbian institutional capacities and education of civil servants according to the requirements of the European Union association and accession;
- Cooperation with specialized legal institutions;
- Analysis of economic aspects of harmonisation with the European Union regulations and standards;
- Participating in coordination of the programming of European Union’s technical assistance;
- Promoting the EU association and accession activities and cooperation with specialized international and domestic economic institutions;
- Partaking in coordination of activities for planning and use of European funds, donations and other forms of foreign development aid
- SEIO prepares for adoption the acts of the Government designed for supervising, directing and harmonizing the activities of ministries and special organizations in relation to the European Union association and accession and formulates public information on the process of European Union accession and association and other activities delegated by the Government.
