= Ministry of European Integration (Serbia) =

Government ministry of Serbia

- Министарство за европске интеграције Ministarstvo za evropske integracije

Ministry overview
- Formed: 29 June 2017; 9 years ago
- Preceding Ministry: European Integration Office
- Jurisdiction: Government of Serbia
- Headquarters: Nemanjina Street 34, Belgrade
- Minister responsible: Nemanja Starović
- Website: mei.gov.rs

The Ministry of European Integration of the Republic of Serbia (Serbian: Министарство за европске интеграције, romanized: Ministarstvo za evropske integracije) is the ministry in the Government of Serbia which is in the charge of the accession of Serbia to the European Union. The current minister is Nemanja Starović, in office since 16 April 2025.

== History ==
The Ministry was established in 2017 in order to meet the increased workload in the process of accession of Serbia to the European Union. With its founding, the European Integration Office was dissolved.

== List of ministers ==
Political Party: SNS n-p

No.	Portrait	Minister	Took office	Left office	Time in office	Party	Cabinet
Ministry of European Integration
1	Jadranka Joksimović	Jadranka Joksimović (born 1978)	29 June 2017	26 October 2022	5 years, 119 days	SNS	Brnabić I–II
2	Tanja Miščević	Tanja Miščević (born 1966)	26 October 2022	16 April 2025	2 years, 172 days	Independent	Brnabić III; Vučević
3	Nemanja Starović	Nemanja Starović (born 1982)	16 April 2025	Incumbent	1 year, 114 days	SNS	Macut
