= Tanja Miščević =

Serbian political scientist and politician

- Тања Мишчевић
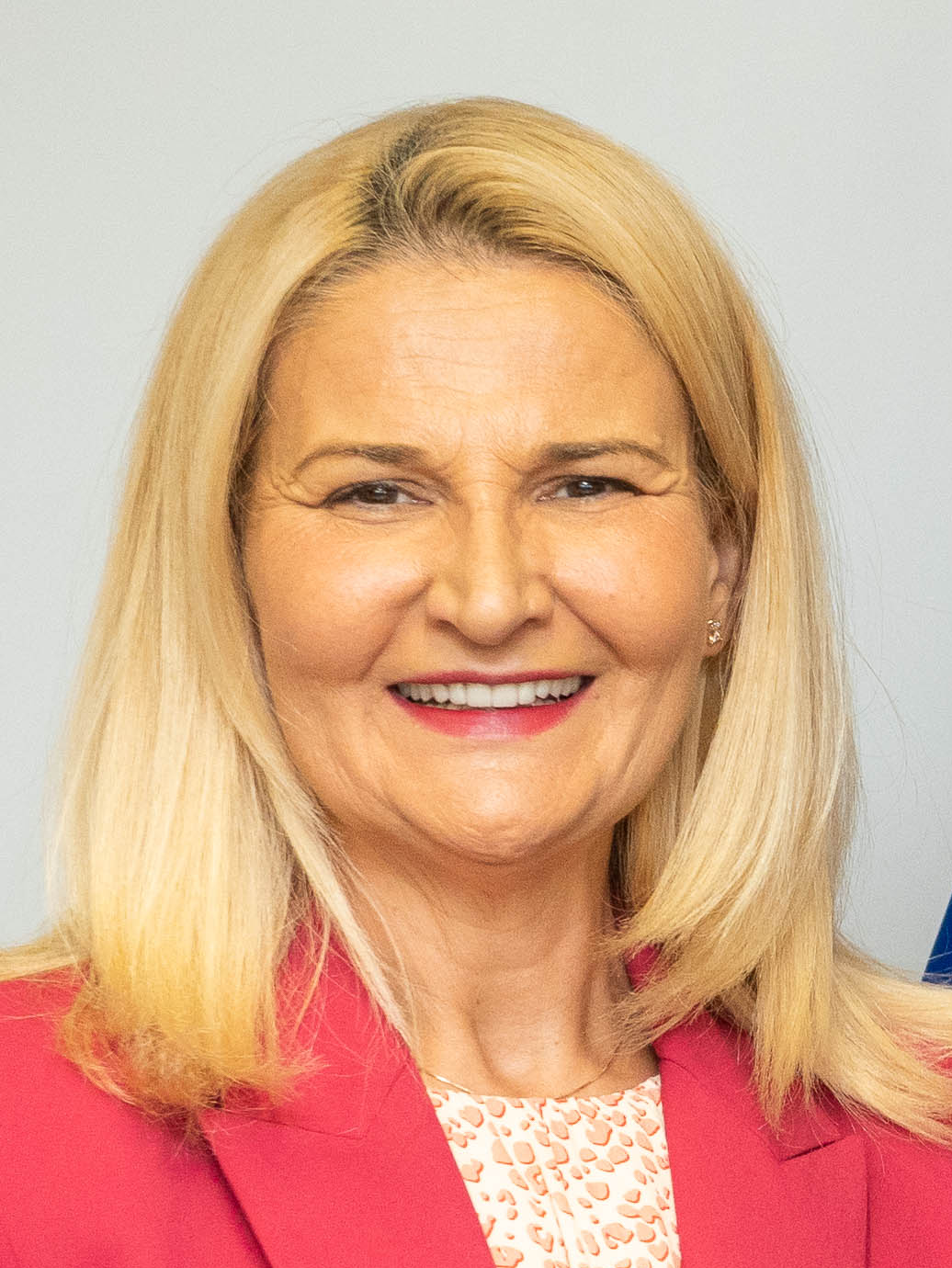
- Miščević in 2024

Minister of European Integration
- In office 26 October 2022 – 16 April 2025
- Prime Minister: Ana Brnabić; Ivica Dačić (acting); Miloš Vučević
- Preceded by: Jadranka Joksimović
- Succeeded by: Nemanja Starović

Head of Negotiating Team for the EU Accession Negotiation
- In office 3 September 2013 – September 2019
- Prime Minister: Ivica Dačić; Aleksandar Vučić; Ana Brnabić

Personal details
- Born: 6 August 1966 (age 60) Belgrade, SR Serbia, SFR Yugoslavia
- Party: Independent
- Education: University of Belgrade
- Profession: Political scientist; professor
- Awards: French National Order of Merit

Tanja Miščević (Serbian Cyrillic: Тања Мишчевић; born 6 August 1966) is a Serbian political scientist and professor who served as minister of European Integration from 2022 to 2025. An independent politician, she is best known for her work on the accession of Serbia to the European Union.

Born in Zemun, a Belgrade municipality, she graduated and earned her master's and doctorate at the Faculty of Political Sciences at the University of Belgrade. She began working at the Faculty of Political Sciences in the 1990s, becoming a docent in 2003 and an associate professor in 2009. As of 2016, she works as a professor at the Faculty of Political Sciences. She was the director of the Office for European Integration from 2005 to 2009; member of government's negotiating team regarding accession of Serbia to the European Union, and head of the negotiating team for the Visa Facilitation Agreement and Readmission Agreement between Serbia and the European Union. She also previously served as vice-president of the European Movement in Serbia and as a member and vice-president of the board of the Anti-Corruption Agency.

She served as the state secretary in the ministry of defence from 2010 to 2012, and was appointed director of the negotiating team regarding the accession of Serbia to the European Union in 2013. As the director, she emphasised on harmonising Serbia's foreign policy positions with the European Union and worked on implementing the reforms into law. She resigned from the role in 2019, after which she began working as deputy secretary general of Regional Cooperation Council until her appointment in the third cabinet of Ana Brnabić in October 2022.

== Early life ==
Tanja Miščević was born on 6 August 1966 in Zemun, Belgrade, Socialist Republic of Serbia, Socialist Federal Republic of Yugoslavia. She finished her primary and secondary education in Zemun. She graduated from the Faculty of Political Sciences at the University of Belgrade in 1989, where she also earned her master's and doctorate. She specialised in the field of the European Union at the University of Bonn in 1988 and the College of Europe in 2004.

== Career ==
=== Faculty of Political Sciences ===
Miščević began her work at the Faculty of Political Sciences at the University of Belgrade in 1991 as a demonstrator for the English language, a role which she held until 1995, when she became an intern assistant. She worked as an assistant until 2003, when she became a docent. In 2009, she became an associate professor at the faculty, where she studied international and legal fields. She became a professor in 2016. Additionally, she was a visiting professor at the Military Academy of the Ministry of Defense and the Centre for European Integration at the University of Bonn.

=== European Integrations ===
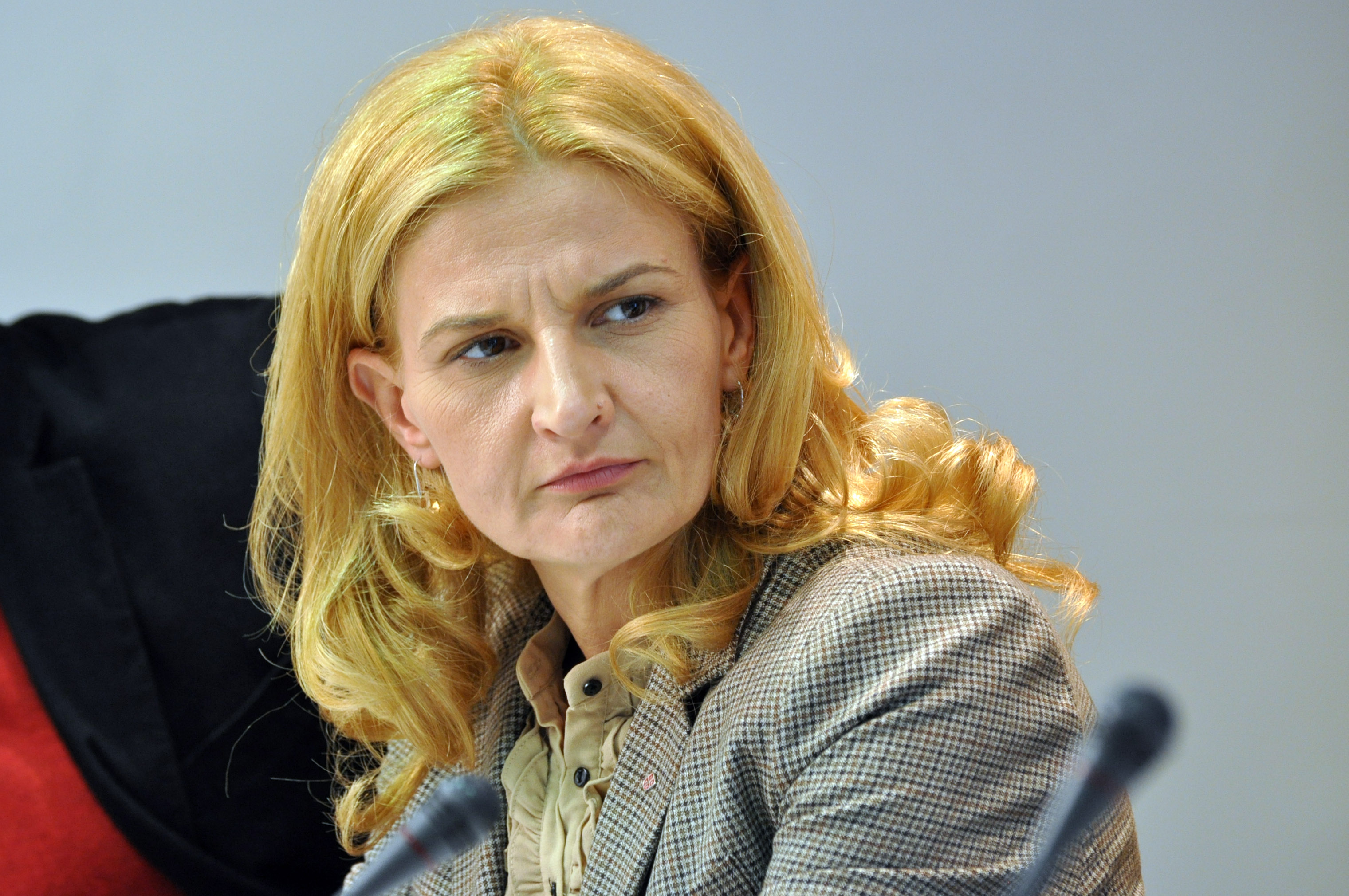
Miščević in 2011

She was one of the founding members of the G17 Institute, a non-governmental organisation later-turned political party, where she worked as a manager for the department of European studies. Between 2005 and 2009, she was the director of the Office for European Integration of the government of Serbia. Miščević won the "Contributor of the Year to Europe" award in 2006. She was a member of government's negotiating team regarding the accession of Serbia to the European Union as well as the head of negotiating team for the conclusion of the Visa Facilitation Agreement and the Readmission Agreement between Serbia and the European Union. Miščević was appointed state secretary in the ministry of defence by Dragan Šutanovac in 2010; she served in that role until July 2012, after which she served as a special secretary for European Integrations for Rasim Ljajić, who at the time served as deputy prime minister. Aleksandar Vučić suggested the appointment of Miščević as the director of the negotiating team regarding the accession of Serbia to the European Union in 2013. She accepted the job shortly after in September 2013. As the director, she urged to implement the reforms into law, to enter the European Union as soon as possible. She also emphasised her support to harmonise Serbia's foreign policy positions with the positions of the European Union. She received the "Rainbow" award from the Gay Straight Alliance due to her contribution for the fight against homophobia and improving rights of the LGBT population. She resigned from the role in September 2019. She soon after became the deputy secretary general of Regional Cooperation Council.

She previously served as vice-president of European Movement in Serbia. From 2013 to 2019, she was the Chief Negotiator for the EU Accesion negociation. Additionally, Miščević served as a member and vice-president of the board of the Anti-Corruption Agency from 2009 to 2010. According to newspaper Danas, Miščević is reputed to be an expert on European Integration of Serbia.

== Minister of European Integration ==
It was announced on 23 October 2022 that Miščević would serve as the minister of European Integration in the third cabinet of Ana Brnabić. She was sworn in on 26 October. Miščević advocates for the accession of Serbia to the European Union, citing her support for a "modern, stable, and developed society, and equality".

In November 2022, Miščević announced that "Serbia will progressively adopt the visa policy of the Schengen Area" and that it will align its foreign and security policy with the European Union.

== Personal life ==
Miščević received the French National Order of Merit in 2017 due to her work on accession of Serbia to the European Union. She speaks English and Russian.

== Published works ==
- Miščević, Tanja (1997). Legitimization for instituting proceedings for the protection of human rights before international organs (in Serbian). Belgrade: Jugoslovensko udruženje za međunarodno pravo. OCLC 1247397784.
- Miščević, Tanja (1998). The ombudsman of the European Union and the protection of the rights of individual subjects (in Serbian). Belgrade: Jugoslovensko udruženje za međunarodno pravo. OCLC 1247397499.
- Miščević, Tanja (2005). Pridruživanje Evropskoj uniji (in Serbian). Institut za ekonomska i socijalna istraživanja. ISBN 9788676420322.
- Miščević, Tanja (2009). Pridruživanje Evropskoj uniji (in Serbian). Službeni glasnik. ISBN 9788651902645.
- Miščević, Tanja (2009). Proces evropske integracije Srbije (in Serbian). OEBS. ISBN 9788685207334.
- Miščević, Tanja; Gavrilović, Slobodan (2010). Ugovor iz Lisabona: Sigurna luka ili početak novog putovanja? (in Serbian). Službeni glasnik. ISBN 9788651906582.
- Miščević, Tanja (2011). Život i istraživanja, spomenica Dejanu Janči (in Serbian). Službeni glasnik. ISBN 9788651909798.
- Miščević, Tanja (2012). Nova era međunarodnich organizacija: odluke savremenih međunarodnih organizacija i njihov uticaj na međunarodne odnose i međunarodno pravo (in Serbian). Službeni glasnik. ISBN 9788651914877.
- Miščević, Tanja; Minić, Jelica; Proroković, Dušan; Žarin, Irina (2016). Budućnost EU i Zapadni Balkan: pogled iz Srbije (in Serbian). Friedrich Ebert Foundation. ISBN 9788683767595.
- Miščević, Tanja (2016). Influence of decisions of some typical international organizations to the development of international law: The case of the United Nations (in Serbian). Belgrade: Institut za međunarodnu politiku i privredu. OCLC 1247397746.
- Miščević, Tanja; Mrak, Mojmir (2017). The EU Accession Process: Western Balkans vs EU-10 (in Serbian). Zagreb: University of Zagreb. OCLC 1247397671.
