= Ivo Visković =

Serbian professor, politician and diplomat

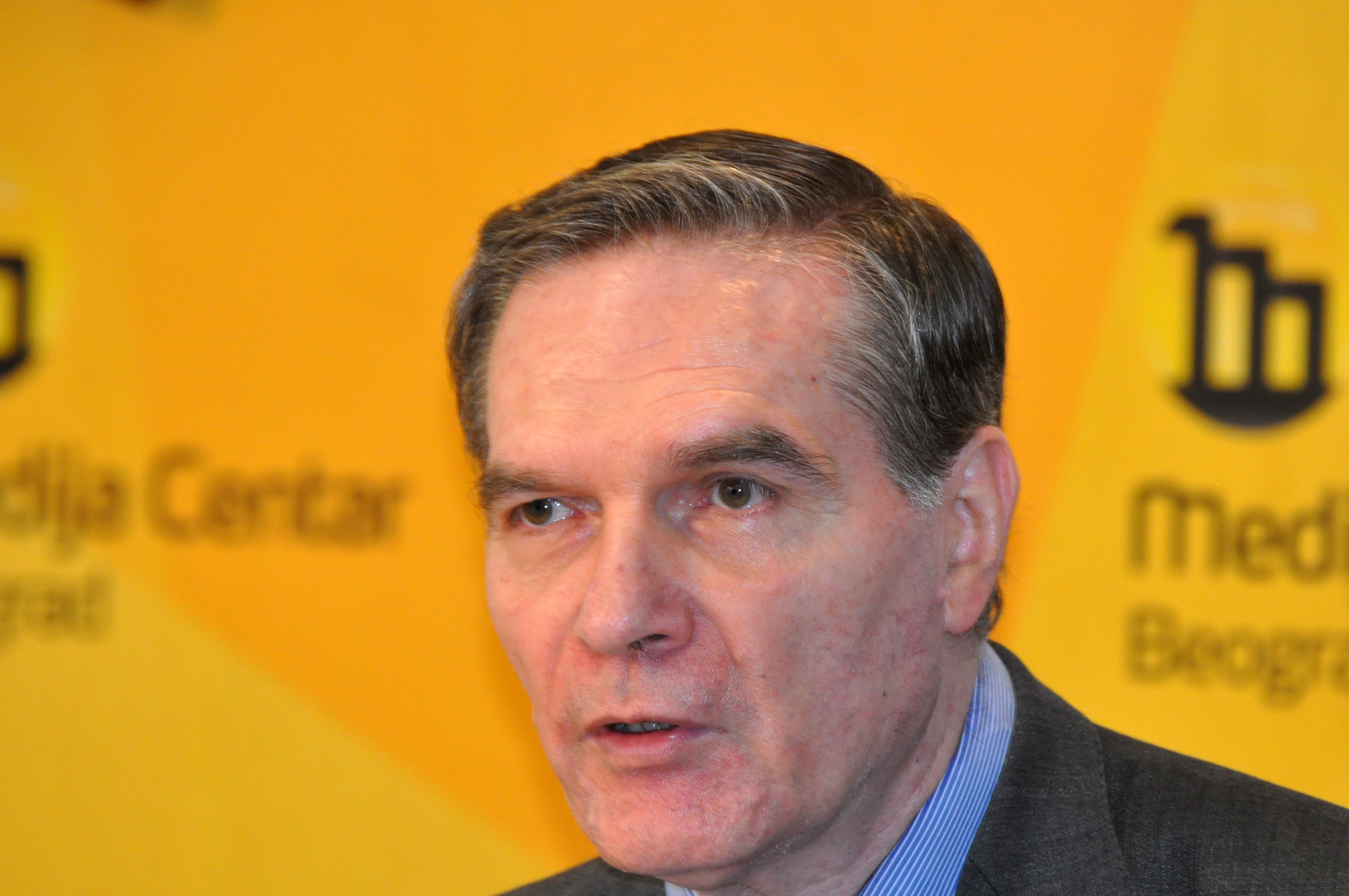
Ivo Visković

Ivo Visković (pronounced [ǐːʋɔ ʋîskɔʋit͡ɕ]; born 1949) is a Serbian Professor, politician and diplomat.

== Biography ==
Visković was born in Makarska, PR Croatia, FPR Yugoslavia. He moved to Belgrade in 1968, where he graduated, acquired MA and in 1984 PhD title on the Faculty of Political Science of the University of Belgrade.

He has lectured at the University of Belgrade Faculty of Political Sciences since 1979, and from 2000 until 2009, he was head of the Department of International Studies.

Additionally, he was from 2006 until 2009 professor of Foreign policy at the University of Montenegro, Podgorica. From 2006 until 2009 he also lectured at the University of Banja Luka, Republic of Srpska, Bosnia and Herzegovina, as a professor of Diplomacy and International relations.

From 2005 until 2009 he was in charge of the "Seminar for international relations and foreign policy" of the Diplomatic academy of the Ministry of Foreign Affairs in Belgrade.

Between 2001 and 2004 he was the Ambassador of FR Yugoslavia/the State Union of Serbia and Montenegro in Ljubljana, Slovenia. He was also the Ambassador of Serbia to Germany from 2009 until 2013, when he came back to teach as professor at the Faculty of Political Science in Belgrade.

From 2014 until 2016 he was one of 15 members of the OSCE's Panel of Eminent Persons on European Security as a Common Project.

He was a member of the Civic Alliance of Serbia (1990-1996) and of Social Democratic Union from its foundation in 1996 until the beginning of his diplomatic career in 2001, and has been member of the European Movement in Serbia and its Forum on International Relations (he was the forum's chairman from 2006 to 2008).

Visković is married and has a son. He is fluent in English and German.
