= Embassy of Serbia, Berlin =

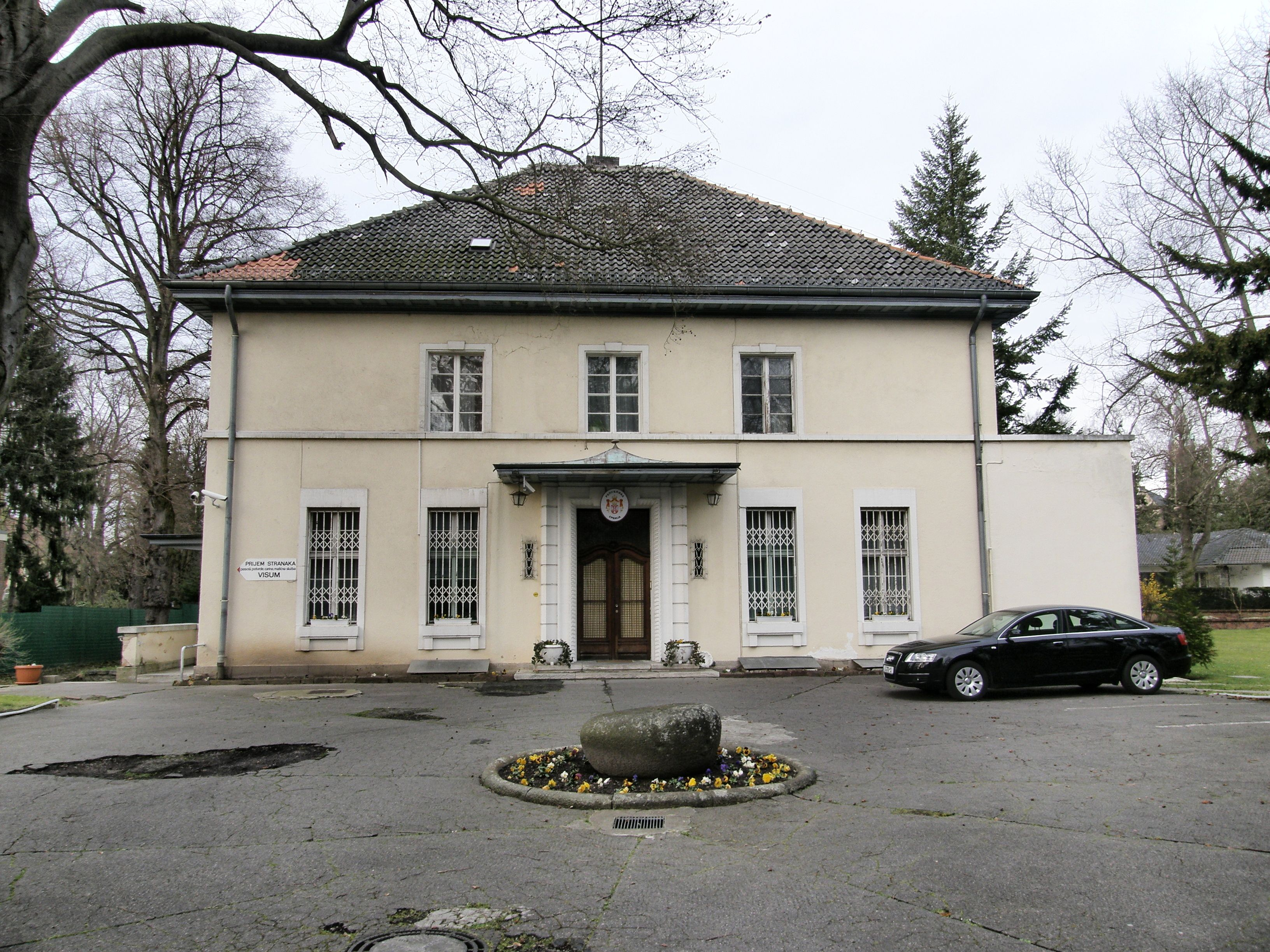
- Location: Berlin, Germany
- Address: Taubert Straße 18, D-14193
- Coordinates: 52.4827°N 13.2717°E
- Ambassador: Dušan Crnogorčević

The Embassy of Serbia in Berlin (German: Botschaft von Serbien in Berlin, Serbian: Амбасада Србије у Берлину)) is diplomatic mission of Serbia to Germany. It is located at Taubert Straße 18.

The current Serbian ambassador to Germany is Dušan Crnogorčević.

== Consulates ==
There are several consulates located throughout Germany:

- Consulate General in Frankfurt (Consul General Branko Radovanović)
- Consulate General in Hamburg (Consul General Nataša Rašević)
- Consulate General in Munich (Consul General Snežana Miljanić)
- Consulate General in Stuttgart (Consul General Božidar Vučurović)
- Consulate General in Düsseldorf (Consul General Branislava Perin Jarić)

== See also ==
- Germany–Serbia relations
- Foreign relations of Serbia
