= Centre for Free Elections and Democracy =

Non-governmental organization in Serbia

CeSID
- Centre for Free Elections and Democracy
- Центар за слободне изборе и демократију Centar za slobodne izbore i demokratiju
- Formation: 1997
- Founder: Marko Blagojević
- Type: Non-governmental organization
- Purpose: Election monitoring Opinion polling
- Headquarters: Dositejeva 8, Belgrade
- Executive Director: Bojan Klačar
- Website: cesid.rs

The Centre for Free Elections and Democracy (Serbian Cyrillic: Центар за слободне изборе и демократију, romanized: Centar za slobodne izbore i demokratiju), or CeSID, is a non-governmental and non-profit organization in Serbia. Founded in 1997, the organization deals with election monitoring in Serbia and the parallel counting up of the votes. CeSID last enclosed about 21,000 volunteers/observers, 165 regional teams, 16 local and 5 regional offices.

== Support ==
As of December 2023, according to the organization, it is supported by:

- Embassy of the United Kingdom
- National Endowment for Democracy
- Rockefeller Brothers Fund
- Olof Palme International Center
- Westminster Foundation for Democracy
- Norwegian People's Aid
- German Marshall Fund
- Charles Stewart Mott Foundation
- European Agency for Reconstruction
- European Commission
- Embassy of Sweden
- Embassy of Switzerland
- United States Institute of Peace
- Civil Rights Defenders
- National Democratic Institute
- Canadian International Development Agency
- Freedom House
- International Research & Exchanges Board
- Office for Democratic Institutions and Human Rights
- Institute for Sustainable Communities
- Open Society Foundations
- United States Agency for International Development
