= Darko Glišić =

Darko Glišić may refer to:

- Darko Glishikj, Macedonian footballer
- Darko Glišić (politician), Serbian politician
