= Aleksandra Sofronijević =

Serbian politician

Aleksandra Damnjanović Sofronijević
- Александра Дамњановић Софронијевић
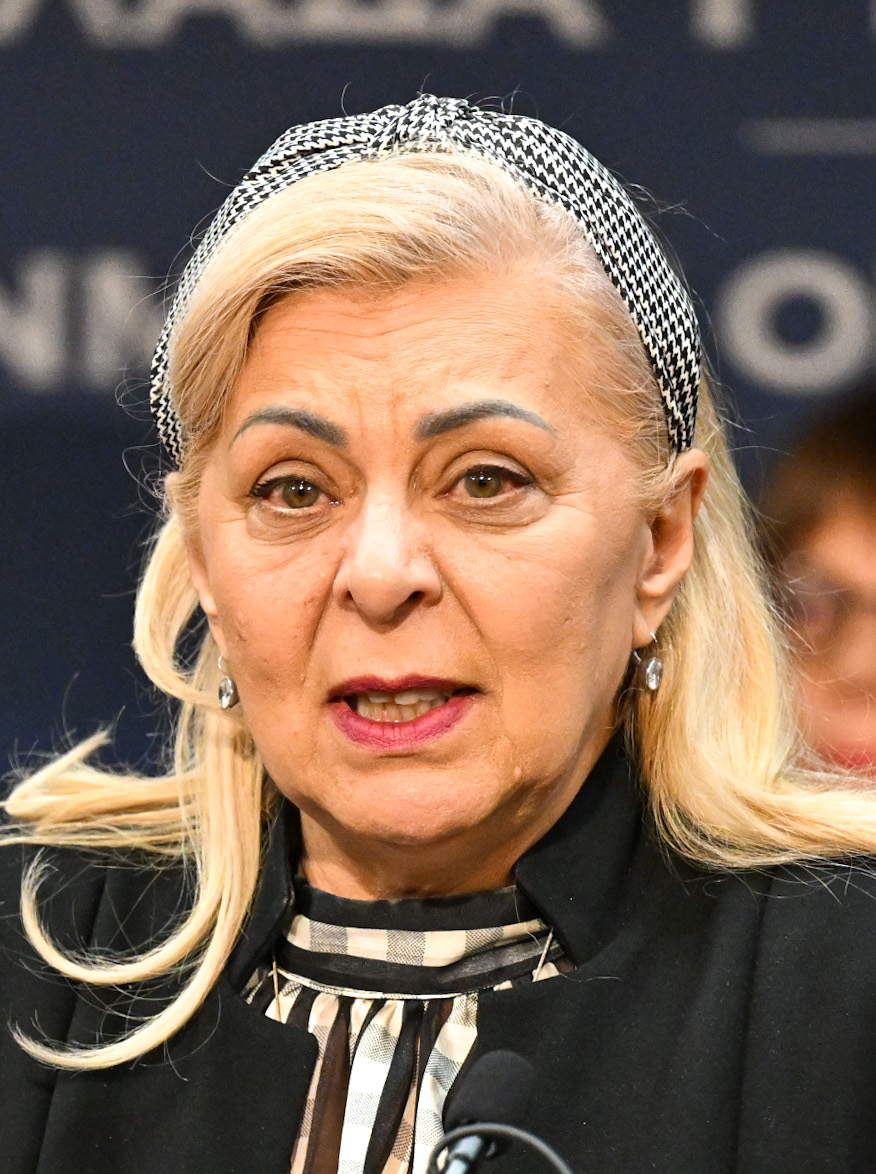
- Sofronijević in 2025

Minister of Construction, Transport and Infrastructure
- Incumbent
- Assumed office April 16, 2025
- Prime Minister: Đuro Macut
- Preceded by: Goran Vesić; Darko Glišić (acting)

State Secretary at the Ministry of Construction, Transport and Infrastructure
- In office May 6, 2014 – April 16, 2025
- Minister: Zorana Mihajlović; Tomislav Momirović; Goran Vesić; Darko Glišić (acting)

Personal details
- Born: 1961 (age 64–65) Obrenovac, SR Serbia, SFR Yugoslavia
- Education: University of Belgrade
- Occupation: Jurist, politician

Aleksandra Damnjanović Sofronijević (Serbian: Александра Дамњановић Софронијевић; born 1961) is a Serbian politician and jurist who has served as Minister of Construction, Transport and Infrastructure since 2025. She has held the position of State Secretary in the Ministry of Construction, Transport and Infrastructure of the Republic of Serbia from 2014 to 2025.

== Biography ==
She was born in 1961 in Obrenovac. She graduated from the Faculty of Law, University of Belgrade.

From 1987 to 2004 she worked in the City Municipality of Savski Venac as advisor, assistant head, and head of departments dealing with property-legal, construction, and communal-housing affairs. Prior to that, she spent two years as a legal intern, specializing in civil law and criminal law.

Between 2004 and 2012 she served as assistant minister in the Ministry of Capital Investments, the Ministry of Infrastructure, and the Ministry of Environmental Protection, Mining, Spatial Planning and Urbanism of the Republic of Serbia.

From 2012 to 2014 she was Assistant Minister of Construction and Urbanism, responsible for the sector overseeing the issuance of building and occupancy permits, energy efficiency in construction, construction land, the republic's construction and communal inspection, and administrative and legal supervision in the areas of state surveying and cadastre.

Since 2014 she has served as State Secretary at the Ministry of Construction, Transport and Infrastructure of the Republic of Serbia.

She has participated in all working groups for drafting laws and by laws in the areas of spatial planning, urbanism, construction, and legalization from 2003 to the present. She has been responsible for the implementation of several state projects (construction of the Avala Tower, addressing the aftermath of the floods in Jaša Tomić, and the consequences of landslides across Serbia). She has also participated, by invitation, in the drafting of laws concerning state surveying and cadastral, restitution of confiscated property, roads, and other specific laws. She is a member of the Government Working Group for selecting concessionaires and later for monitoring the concession for Belgrade Nikola Tesla Airport. She is also a member of the Management Board of the Civil Aviation Directorate.

On December 10, 2024, she was proposed for the position of Minister of Construction, Transport and Infrastructure, replacing her previous role as State Secretary in the same ministry. A month earlier, the previous minister, Goran Vesić, resigned following the Novi Sad railway station canopy collapse, which claimed 15 lives. She was later elected as the Minister of Construction in Macut's government.

== Private life ==
She speaks English and is the mother of an adult child.
