= Marko Blagojević (born 1974) =

Serbian politician

- Марко Благојевић
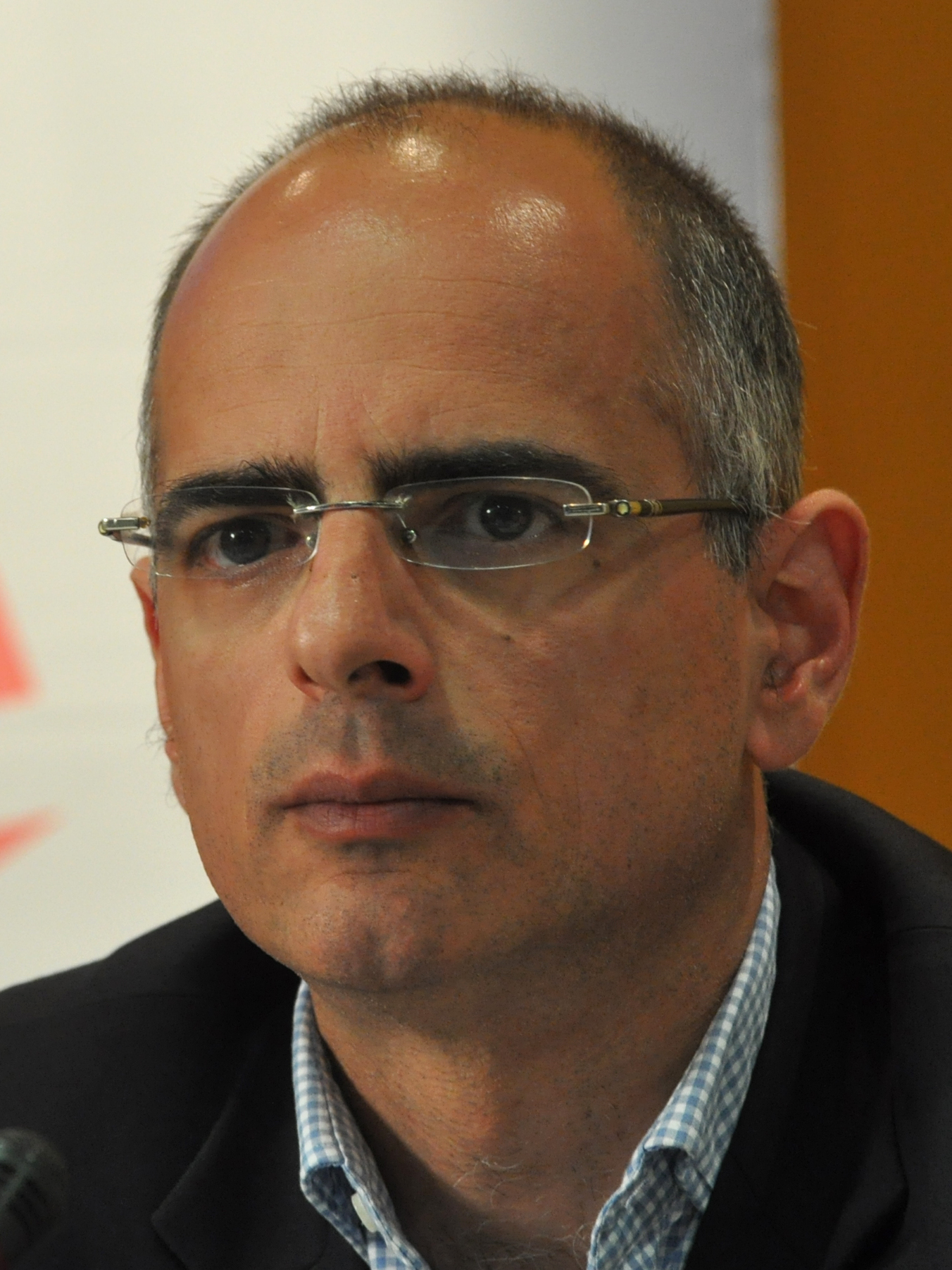
- Blagojević in 2015

Minister for Public Investments
- In office 26 October 2022 – 2 May 2024
- Prime Minister: Ana Brnabić
- Preceded by: Office established
- Succeeded by: Darko Glišić

Personal details
- Born: 20 April 1974 (age 52) Belgrade, SR Serbia, SFR Yugoslavia
- Party: Independent
- Children: 1
- Education: University of Belgrade
- Occupation: Politician

Marko Blagojević (Serbian Cyrillic: Марко Благојевић; born 20 April 1974) is a Serbian politician who served as minister for public investments from 2022 to 2024.

== Early life ==
Marko Blagojević was born on 20 April 1974 in Belgrade, Socialist Republic of Serbia, Socialist Federal Republic of Yugoslavia. He graduated from the Faculty of Law at the University of Belgrade.

== Career ==
Blagojević was politically active through the 1990s. He took part in the 1996–1997 protests against Slobodan Milošević. In 1997, he co-founded CeSID, a non-governmental organisation; he was its member until 2014. He was a member of the board of directors of the Open Society Fund from 2003 to 2008. In 2014, the Government of Serbia named him the director of the Office for Relief and Reconstruction of Flooded Areas, while a year later he became the director of the Office for Public Investment Management. He has held the office until 2022.

=== Minister for Public Investments ===
It was announced on 24 October 2022 that Blagojević would serve as minister for public investments in the third cabinet of Ana Brnabić. He was sworn in on 26 October.

== Personal life ==
Blagojević is married and has one daughter.
