= Goran Vesić =

Serbian politician (born 1969)

- Горан Весић
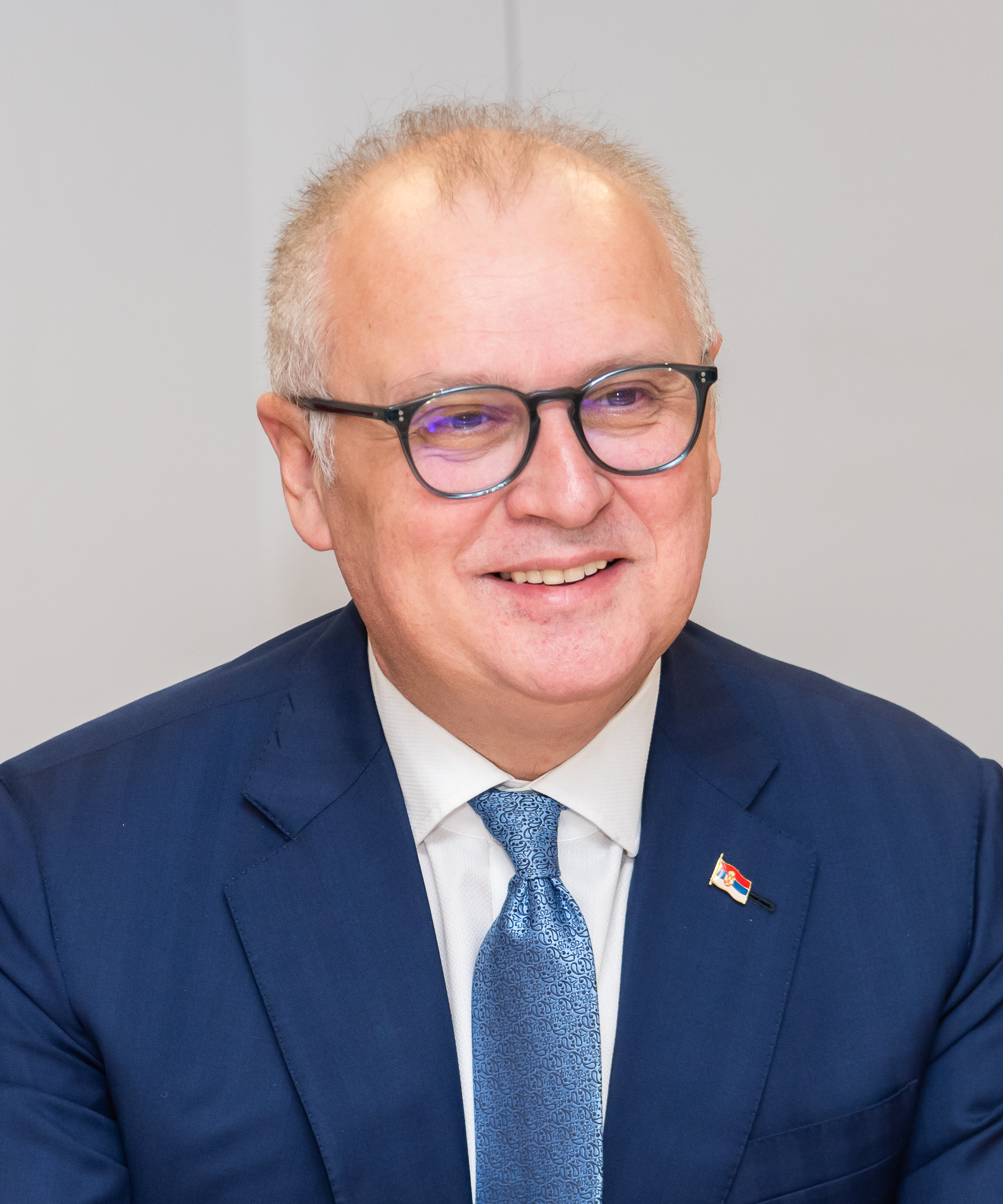
- Vesić in 2023

Minister of Construction, Transport and Infrastructure
- In office 26 October 2022 – 25 November 2024
- Prime Minister: Ana Brnabić; Ivica Dačić (acting); Miloš Vučević
- Preceded by: Tomislav Momirović
- Succeeded by: Darko Glišić (acting); Aleksandra Sofronijević

Member of the National Assembly
- In office 1 August 2022 – 24 October 2022
- In office 22 January 2001 – 4 February 2004

Deputy Mayor of Belgrade
- In office 7 June 2018 – 20 June 2022
- Preceded by: Andreja Mladenović
- Succeeded by: Vesna Vidović

Personal details
- Born: 18 February 1969 (age 57) Kruševac, SR Serbia, SFR Yugoslavia
- Party: DS (1990–2013); SNS (2013–present)
- Education: University of Belgrade

Goran Vesić (Serbian Cyrillic: Горан Весић; born 18 February 1969) is a Serbian politician who served as the minister of construction, transport and infrastructure from 2022 to 2024. A member of the Serbian Progressive Party, he served as a member of the National Assembly of Serbia from 2001 to 2004 and briefly in 2022. He also served as the deputy mayor of Belgrade from 2018 to 2022.

Vesić resigned as construction minister in the aftermath of the Novi Sad railway station canopy collapse and was subsequently arrested. His term ended on 25 November 2024.

== Early life ==
He finished elementary school and high school in Kraljevo. He graduated from University of Belgrade, Faculty of Law, and he was a Robert Schumann European Foundation intern in the European Parliament in 1999.

== Political career ==
=== Democratic Party ===
From February to September 1997, he was a member of the Executive Board of the Assembly of the City of Belgrade, and from 1996 to 2000 he was a member of the Assembly of the City of Belgrade. From 2001 to 2004 he was a member of the National Assembly of the Republic of Serbia after being elected as a candidate of the Democratic Opposition of Serbia (DOS). From 2001 to 2002 he was the President of the Administrative Board of the National Assembly of the Republic of Serbia. He served as an advisor to the Federal Minister of the Interior of the FR Yugoslavia and Deputy Chairman of the Committee for Defense and Security of the National Assembly of the Republic of Serbia from 2001 to 2003, and as an advisor to the ministers of defense of Serbia and Montenegro from 2003 to 2004. Member of the commission for the division of military property between Serbia and Montenegro after the termination of the existence of FR Yugoslavia and the formation of the State Union of Serbia and Montenegro in the period from 2003 to 2004. He was a member of the Assembly of the city municipality of Vračar from 2004 to 2008.

From 1994 to 1997, he was the head of the cabinet of the president of the Democratic Party (DS), Zoran Đinđić. He participated as an advisor in all election campaigns of the prime minister of Montenegro, Milo Đukanović, from 1997 to 2000, as well as in the election campaign of the former president of Republika Srpska Biljana Plavšić in 1997. After 2004, he actively participated in election campaigns in Slovenia, Montenegro, Bulgaria and North Macedonia.

=== Serbian Progressive Party ===
In 2013 he left the Democratic Party, and joined the Serbian Progressive Party (SNS). In 2013, he became a member of the main board of the Serbian Progressive Party, and in 2016 he became a member of the presidency of the party.

From 2014 to June 2018, he was the manager of the city of Belgrade. In June 2018, by the decision of the Assembly of the City of Belgrade, he was elected deputy mayor. He was sometimes described as the de facto mayor of Belgrade. During his term, Vesić was considered one of the most unpopular politicians in Serbia. In February 2022, he was named deputy chief of the SNS election headquarters at a session of the party leadership. He was replaced by Vesna Vidović in June 2022.

Vesić appeared in the 17th position on the Serbian Progressive Party's Together We Can Do Everything electoral list in the 2022 general election. This was tantamount to election, and he was indeed elected to the National Assembly of Serbia when the list won a plurality victory with 120 out of 250 seats. Vesić was appointed minister of construction, transport and infrastructure and took office on 26 October 2022.

In July 2024, Vesić tested positive for the coronavirus. He was placed on home treatment, and he continued to perform his duties from home.

==== Novi Sad railway station canopy collapse and arrest ====
Following the Novi Sad railway station canopy collapse and the death of 14 people on 1 November 2024, Vesić held a conference and announced his resignation as minister of construction on 4 November, while denying his responsibility for the accident. Vesić officially resigned the following day. His resignation was acknowledged by the National Assembly on 25 November.

The railway station was renovated from 2021 to 2024 and Vesić participated in the opening ceremony of the renovated station. Vesić was arrested on 21 November due to the collapse of a railway station in Novi Sad. He was facing charges of causing public danger, a crime punishable by up to 12 years in prison. The High Court in Novi Sad ordered Vesić to be detained for up to 30 days, which prompted Vesić to start a hunger strike. On 26 November, Vesić was transferred to the Institute for Cardiovascular Diseases in Sremska Kamenica due to worsening health conditions. On 27 November, all charges against Vesić were dropped and he was released from custody.

On 24 December 2025, the Novi Sad High Court dropped charges against Vesić and five other defendants over the collapse, citing insufficient evidence.

== Personal life ==
Vesić is an avid FK Crvena Zvezda supporter and has served on the main board of the team.
