= Ministry for Public Investments (Serbia) =

Government ministry of Serbia

- Министарство за јавна улагања Ministarstvo za javna ulaganja

Ministry overview
- Formed: 22 October 2022; 3 years ago
- Jurisdiction: Government of Serbia
- Headquarters: Nemanjina 11, Belgrade
- Minister responsible: Darko Glišić
- Website: obnova.gov.rs

Ministry for Public Investments (Serbian: Министарство за јавна улагања, romanized: Ministarstvo za javna ulaganja) is a ministry in the Government of Serbia in the Government of Serbia, responsible for managing and overseeing public investment programs. Marko Blagojević was its minister from 26 October 2022, when the third cabinet of Ana Brnabić was sworn in. On 2 May 2024, Darko Glišić became the minister.

== History ==
The Ministry for Public Investments is the direct successor of the Office for Public Investment Management which was headed by Marko Blagojević.

== List of ministers ==
Political Party: SNS n-p

No.	Portrait	Minister	Took office	Left office	Time in office	Party	Cabinet
1	Marko Blagojević	Marko Blagojević (born 1974)	26 October 2022	2 May 2024	1 year, 189 days	Independent	Brnabić (III)
2	Darko Glišić	Darko Glišić (born 1973)	2 May 2024	Incumbent	2 years, 46 days	SNS	Vučević (I); Macut (I)
