= Darko Glišić (politician) =

Serbian politician (born 1973)

- Дарко Глишић
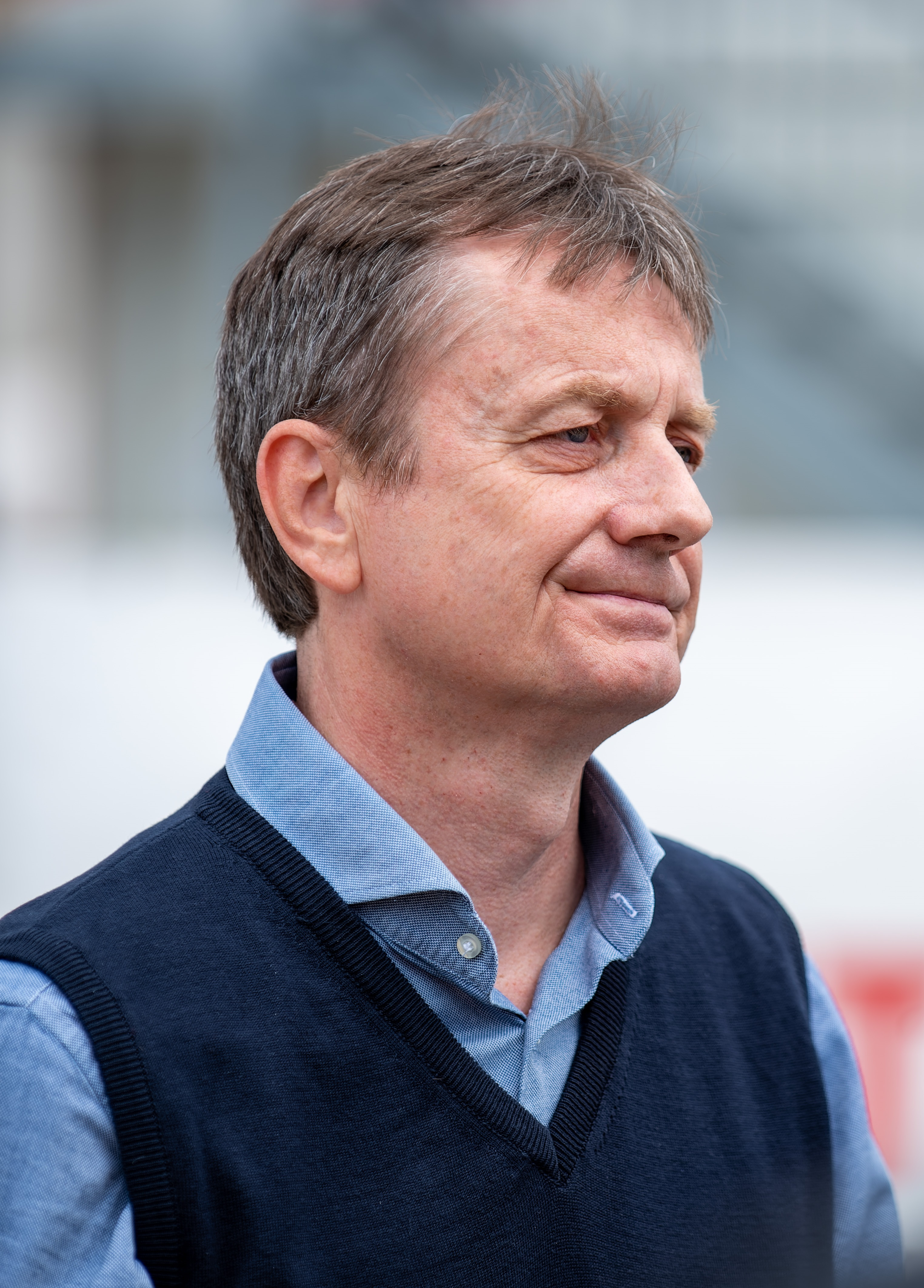
- Glišić in 2025

Minister for Public Investments
- Incumbent
- Assumed office 2 May 2024
- Prime Minister: Miloš Vučević; Đuro Macut
- Preceded by: Marko Blagojević

Minister of Construction, Transport and Infrastructure
- Acting; 25 November 2024 – 16 April 2025
- Prime Minister: Miloš Vučević
- Preceded by: Goran Vesić
- Succeeded by: Aleksandra Sofronijević

President of the Municipality of Ub
- In office 28 May 2012 – 2 May 2024
- Preceded by: Vladislav Krsmanović
- Succeeded by: Aleksandar Jovanović

Member of the National Assembly
- In office 27 January 2004 – 11 June 2008

Personal details
- Born: 28 May 1973 (age 53) Ub, SR Serbia, SFR Yugoslavia
- Party: SRS (1997–2008); SNS (2008–present)
- Children: 2
- Education: Higher Construction and Surveying School
- Occupation: Politician

Darko Glišić (Serbian Cyrillic: Дарко Глишић, born 28 May 1973) is a Serbian politician, serving as minister for public investments since 2024. He was previously the mayor of Ub. A former member of the Serbian Radical Party (SRS), he is now the president of the executive board of the ruling Serbian Progressive Party (SNS).

== Early life and education ==
Glišić was born on 28 May 1973 in Ub, SR Serbia, SFR Yugoslavia. He graduated from the Higher Construction and Surveying School in Belgrade.

== Political career ==
In 1997, Glišić joined the far-right Serbian Radical Party (SRS) and was elected vice-president of the party's Kolubara District branch. In 2000, he was elected president of the SRS's Kolubara District branch. He served as the president of the Assembly of the Municipality of Ub from 2005 to 2006 and was a member of the National Assembly from 2004 to 2008.

SRS split later in 2008, and Glišić was one of the founders of the populist Serbian Progressive Party (SNS) led by Tomislav Nikolić and Aleksandar Vučić. He is a close associate and confidant of President Aleksandar Vučić. Since 2012, Glišić has been serving as the mayor of Ub. In 2016, Glišić was elected president of SNS's executive board succeeding Radomir Nikolić. He has been described as one of the most powerful people in SNS and its key operative.

In May 2023, during the ongoing protests, Glišić said that the actors who are against the regime "should go act somewhere else". Actor Petar Božović reacted by saying that Glišić's statement has "traces of fascism". His statements were also criticized by actors Nikola Kojo and Dragan Bjelogrlić. On 4 June 2023, Glišić insulted government minister Rade Basta, calling him a "NATO scum".

=== Government minister ===
On 2 May 2024, Glišić was appointed minister for public investments in the cabinet of Miloš Vučević. Following the Novi Sad railway station canopy collapse and the resignation of Goran Vesić, Glišić was appointed acting minister of construction, transport and infrastructure on 25 November 2024 and will serve until the new minister takes office.

In October 2024, he was awarded honorary citizenship of Ćuprija.

== Personal life ==
Glišić is married and has two sons. He is a fan of foreign rock music and is the president of ŽOK Ub, a women's volleyball club.
