= List of diplomatic missions in Serbia =

This is a list of diplomatic missions in Serbia. At present, Serbia hosts 72 foreign embassies in Belgrade and 9 consulates. Serbia also hosts representatives of the Palestinian National Authority and Sovereign Military Order of Malta.

Honorary consulates and trade missions are excluded from this listing.

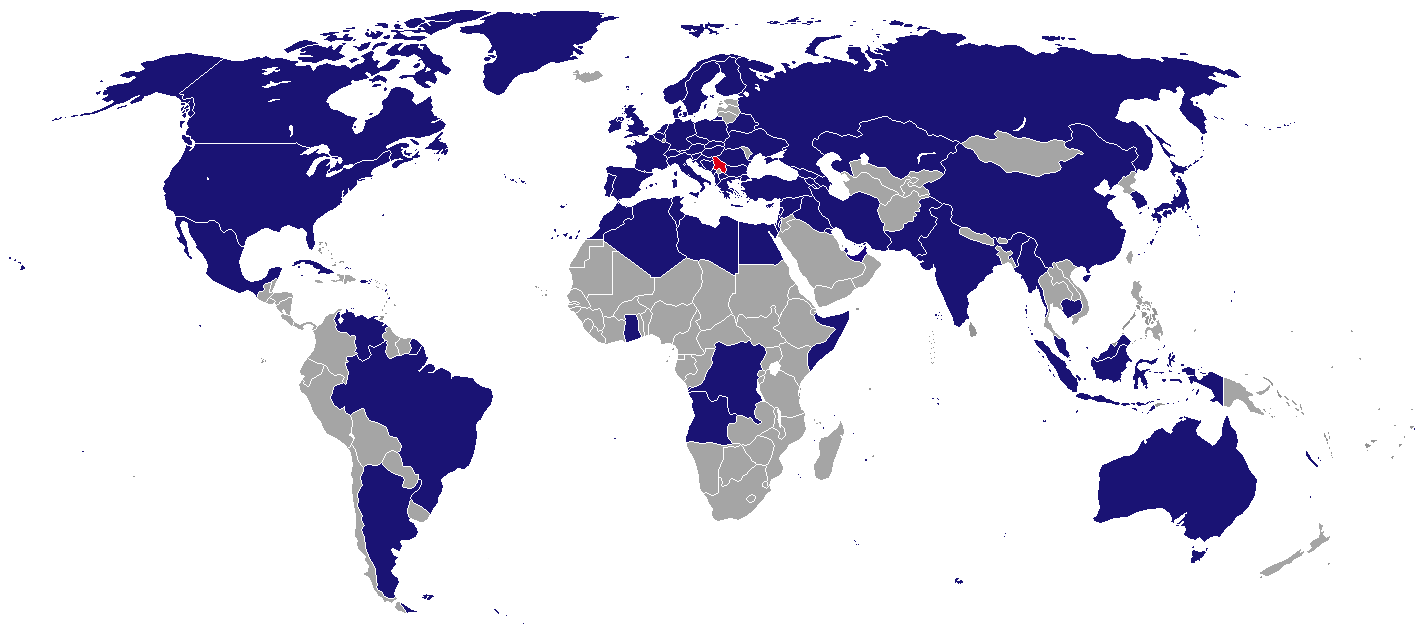
Map of countries that maintain embassies in Serbia Serbia Embassy

== Diplomatic missions in Belgrade ==
=== Embassies ===
1. Albania
2. Algeria
3. Angola
4. Argentina
5. Australia
6. Austria
7. Azerbaijan
8. Belarus
9. Belgium
10. Bosnia and Herzegovina
11. Brazil
12. Bulgaria
13. Cambodia
14. Canada
15. China
16. Congo-Kinshasa
17. Croatia
18. Cuba
19. Cyprus
20. Czechia
21. Denmark
22. Egypt
23. Finland
24. France
25. Germany
26. Ghana
27. Greece
28. Holy See
29. Hungary
30. India
31. Indonesia
32. Iran
33. Iraq
34. Ireland
35. Israel
36. Italy
37. Japan
38. Kazakhstan
39. Kuwait
40. Lebanon
41. Libya
42. Malaysia
43. Mexico
44. Montenegro
45. Morocco
46. Myanmar
47. Netherlands
48. North Macedonia
49. Norway
50. Pakistan
51. Palestine
52. Poland
53. Portugal
54. Qatar
55. Romania
56. Russia
57. Slovakia
58. Slovenia
59. Somalia
60. South Korea
61. Sovereign Military Order of Malta
62. Spain
63. Sweden
64. Switzerland (Note: Also conducts relations on behalf of Liechtenstein.)
65. Syria
66. Tunisia
67. Turkey
68. Ukraine
69. United Arab Emirates
70. United Kingdom
71. United States
72. Venezuela

=== Other delegations or missions ===
1. Armenia (Embassy office) (Note: Subordinate to the Armenian embassy in Prague.)
2. Council of Europe (Office)
3. European Union (Delegation)
4. Georgia (Embassy office) (Note: Subordinate to the Georgian embassy in Athens.)
5. International Committee of the Red Cross (Delegation)
6. Kosovo (Liaison office)
7. NATO (Liaison Office)
8. United Nations (Resident Coordinator's Office)

=== Gallery ===
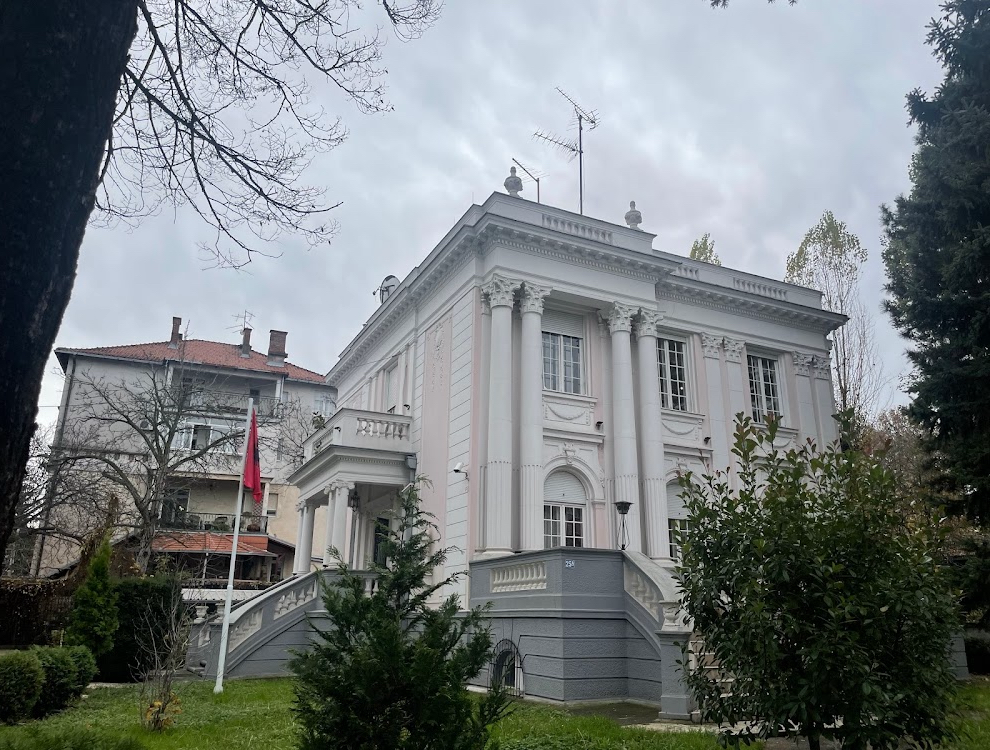
Embassy of Albania

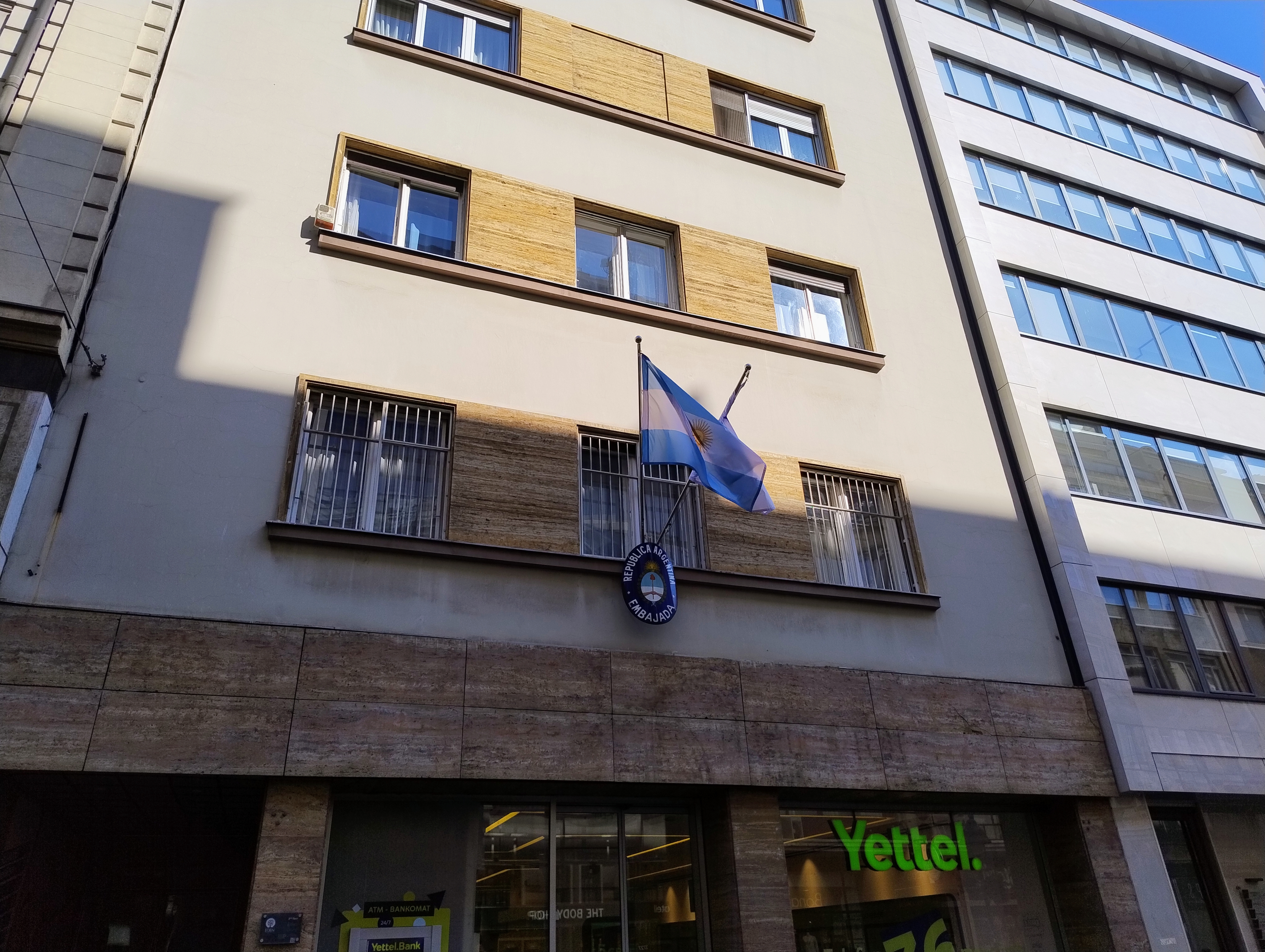
Embassy of Argentina

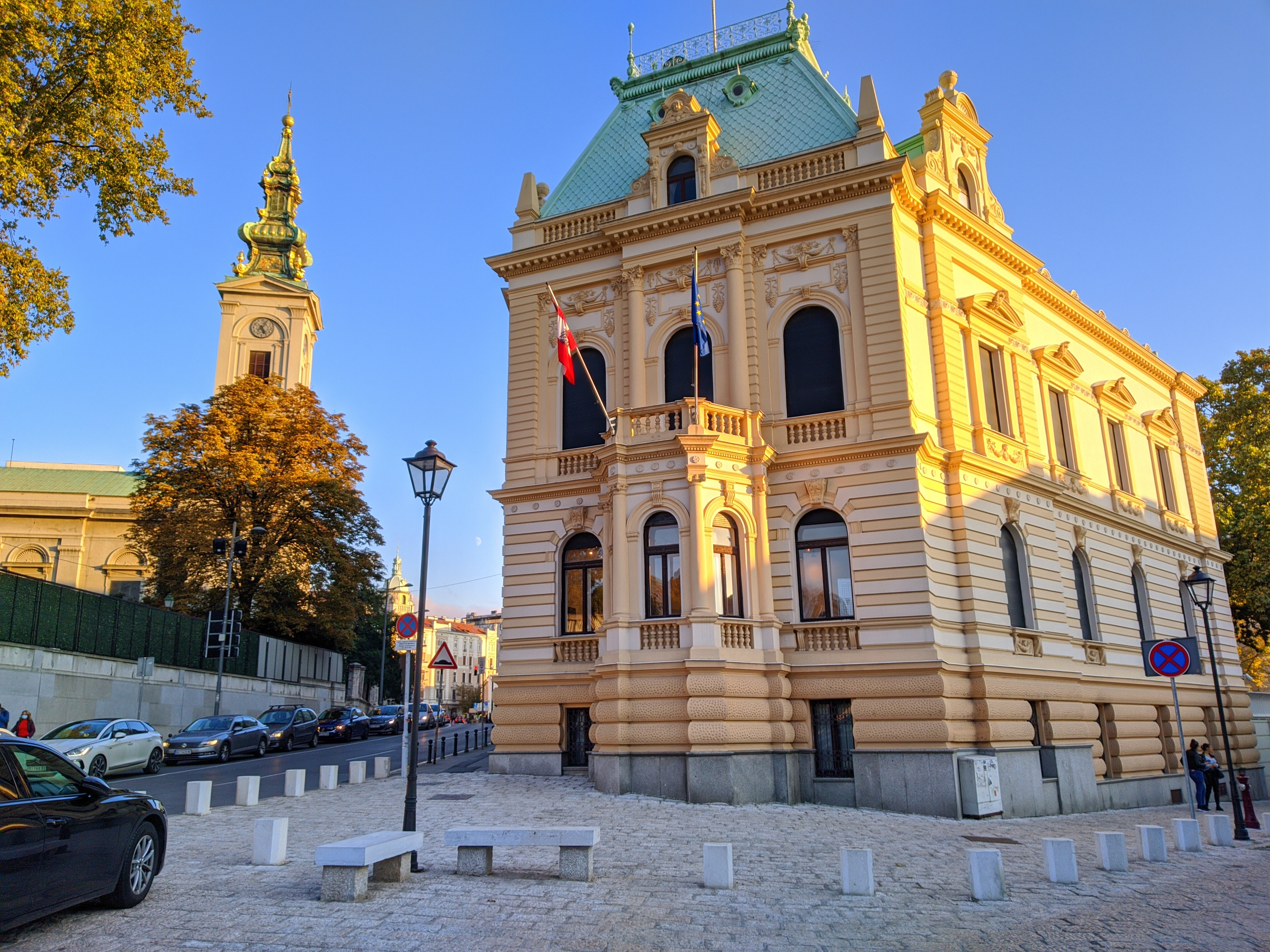
Embassy of Austria

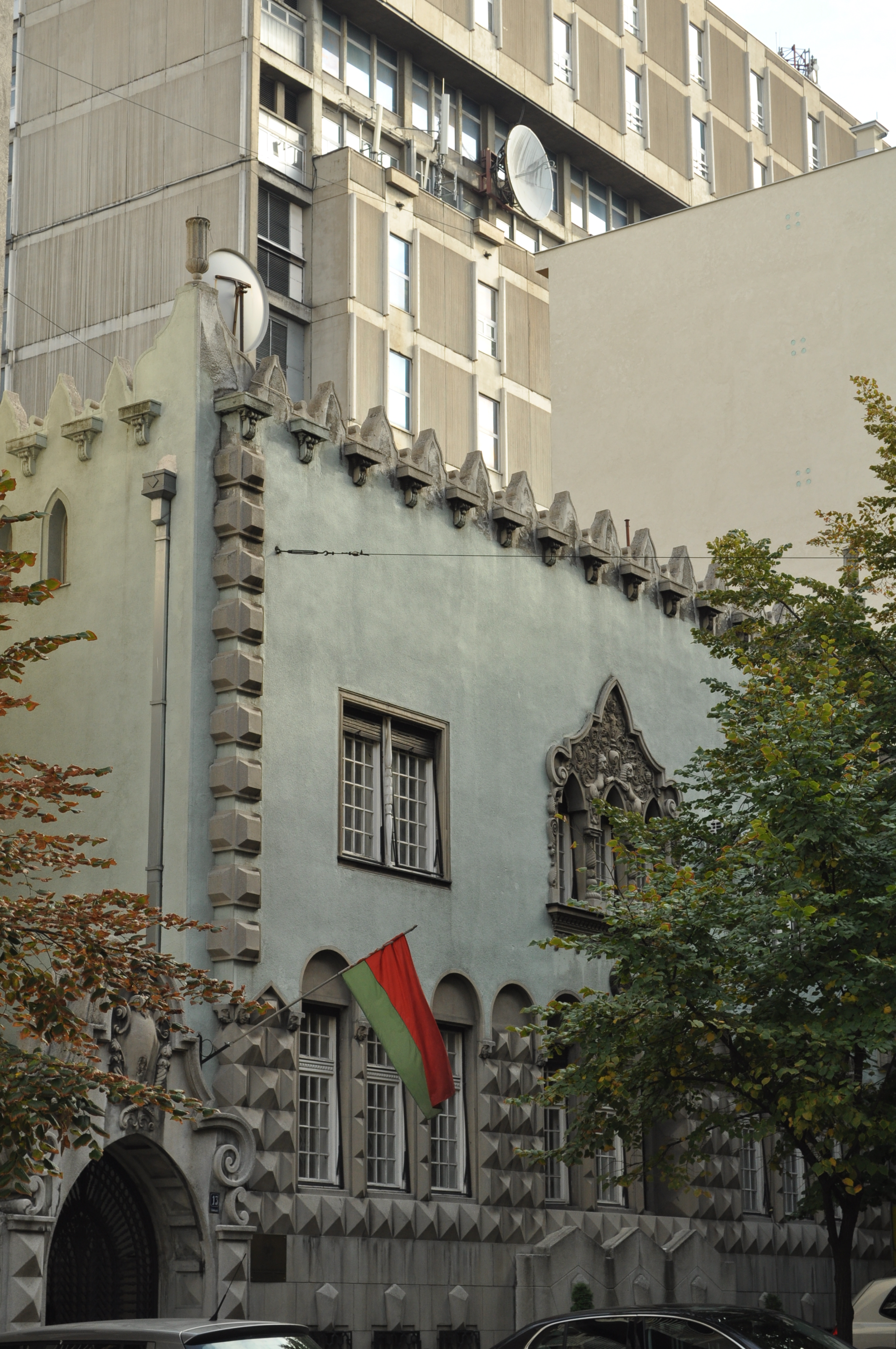
Embassy of Belarus

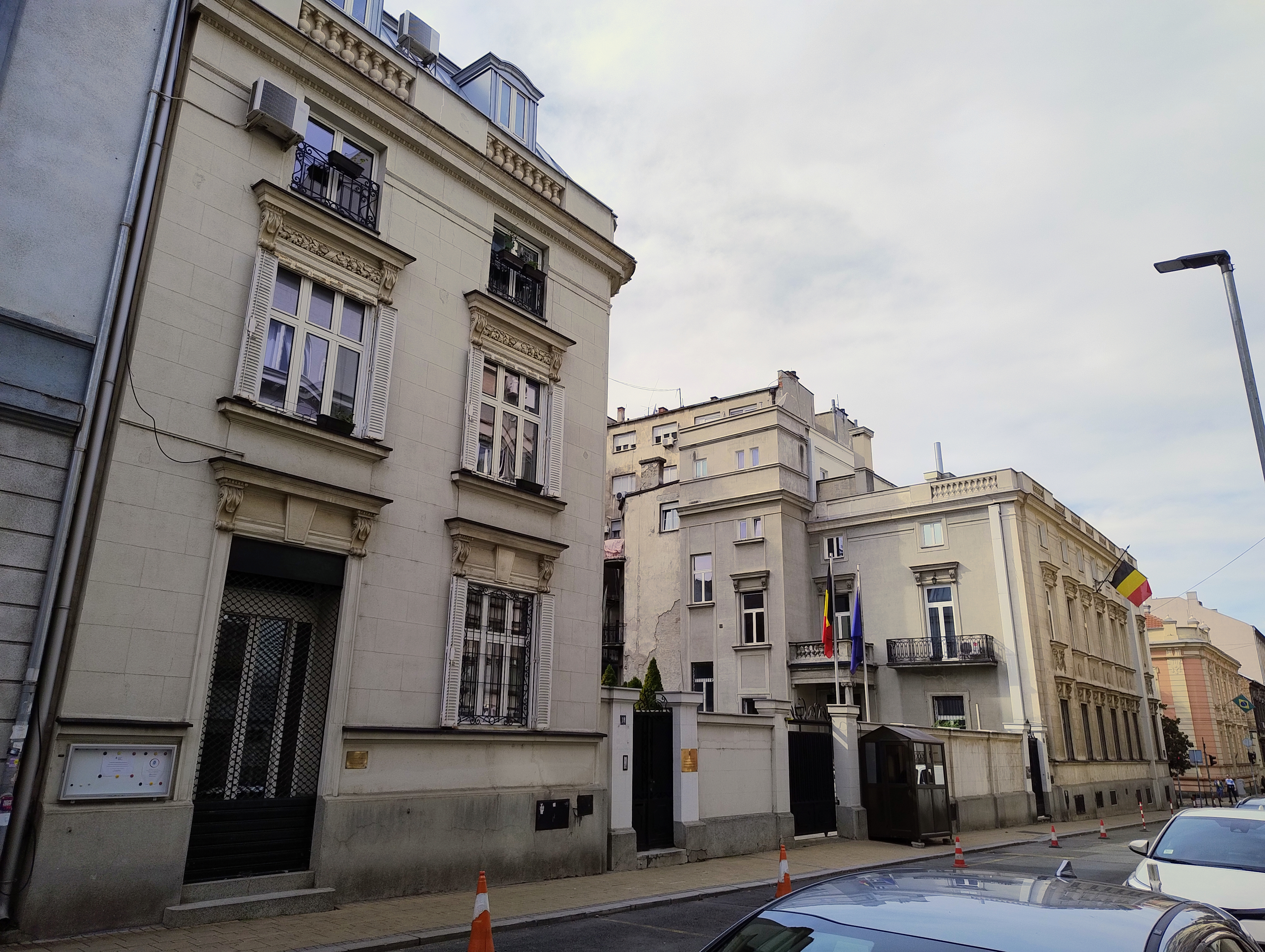
Embassy of Belgium

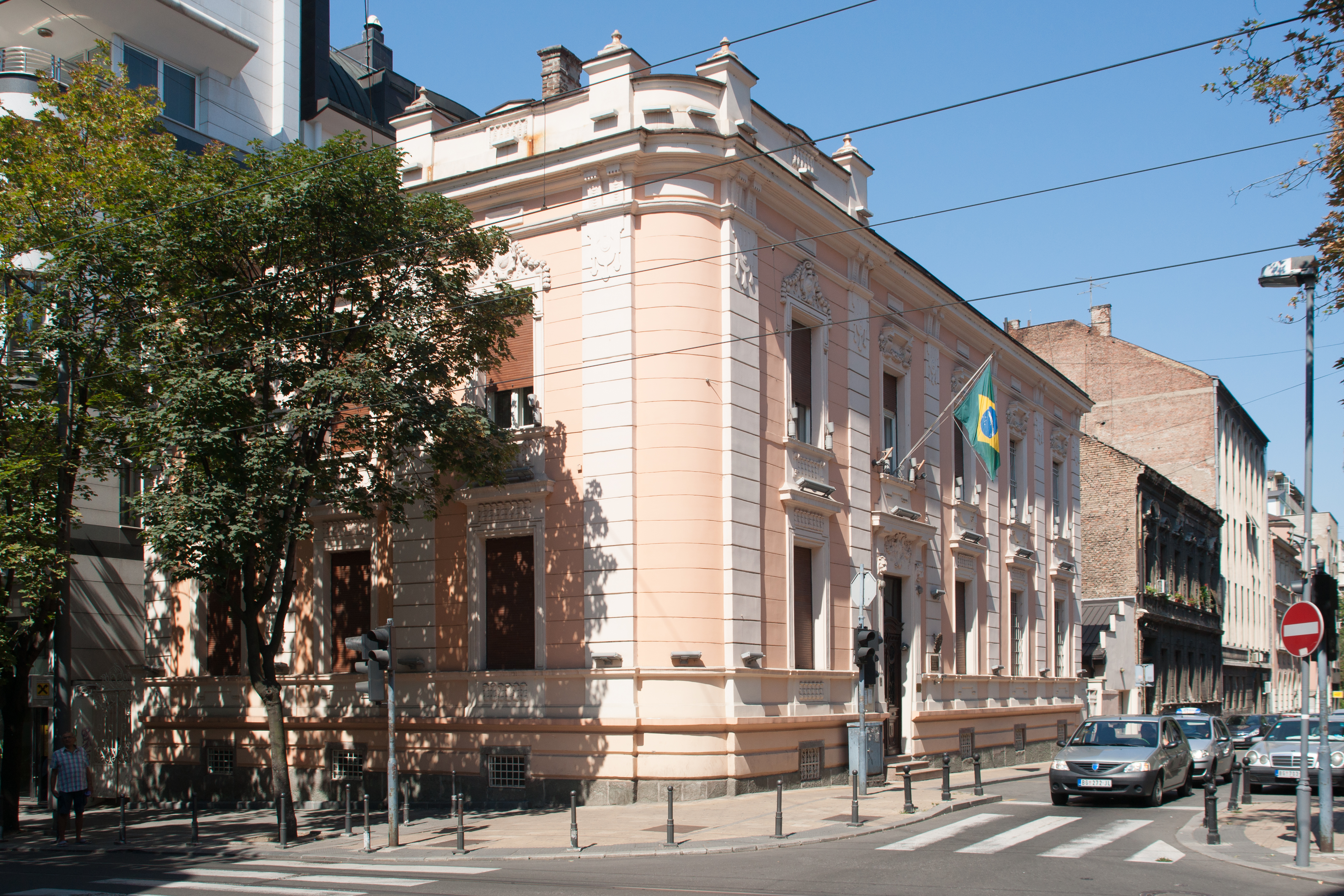
Embassy of Brazil

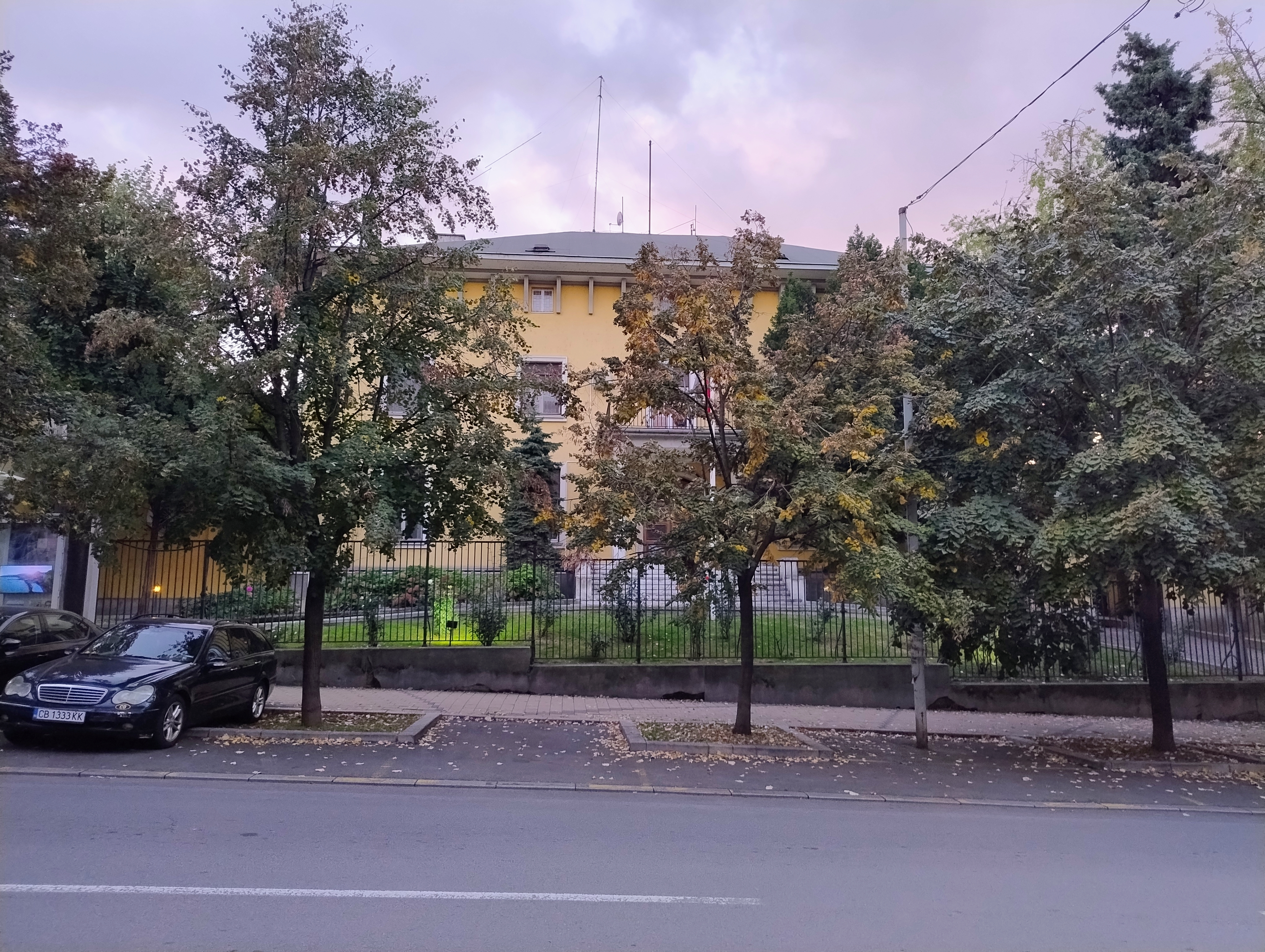
Embassy of Bulgaria

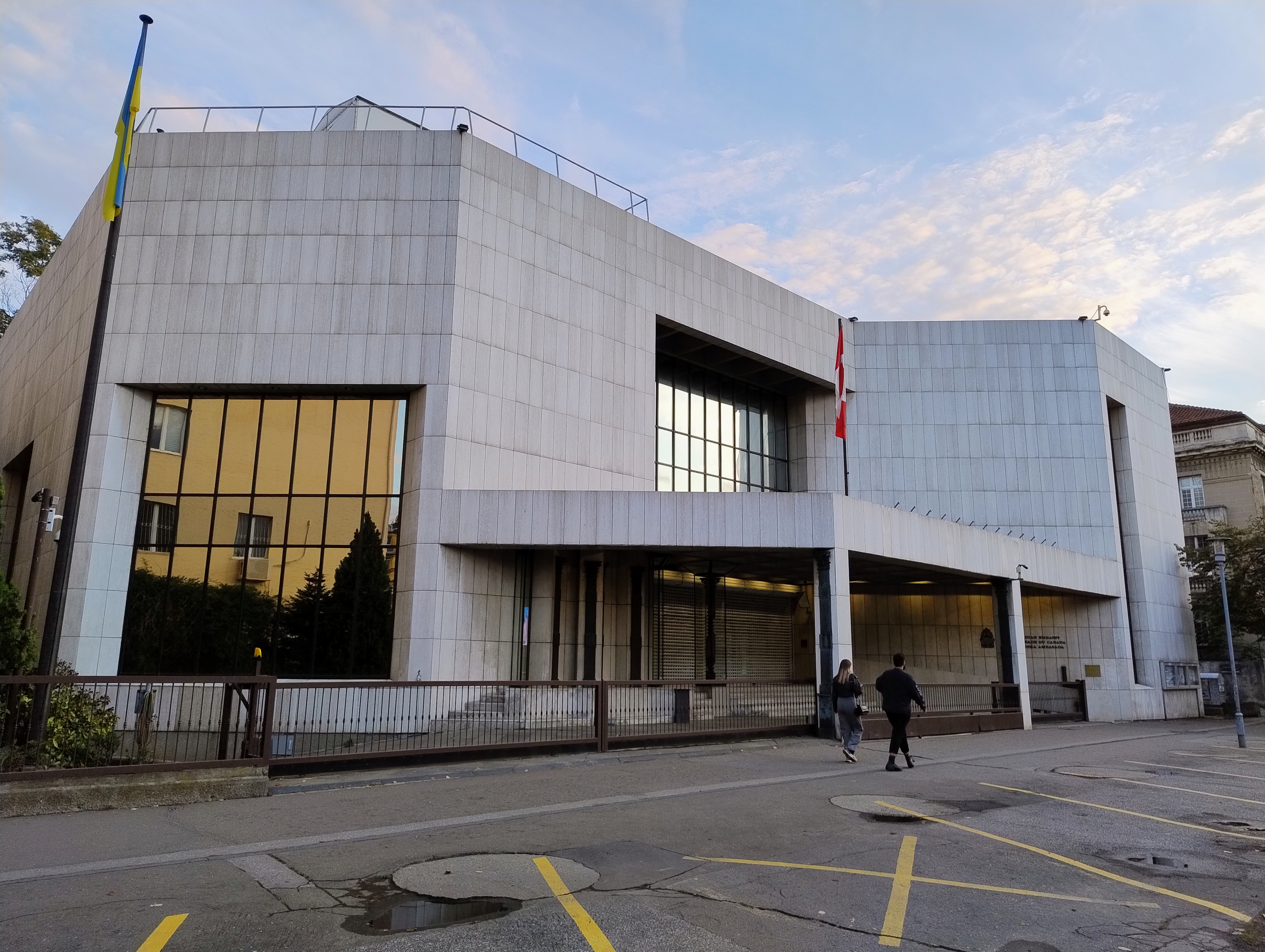
Embassy of Canada

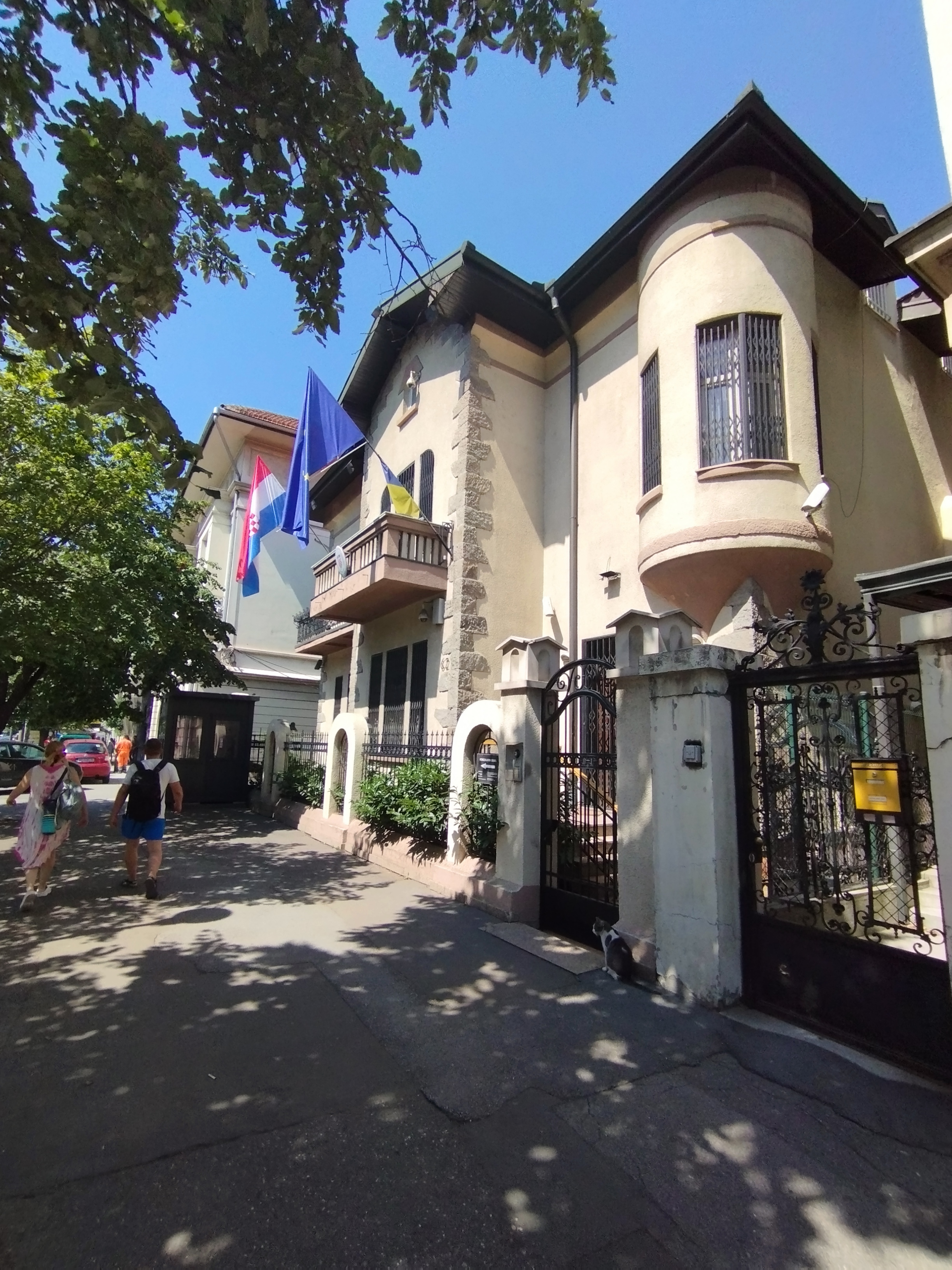
Embassy of Croatia

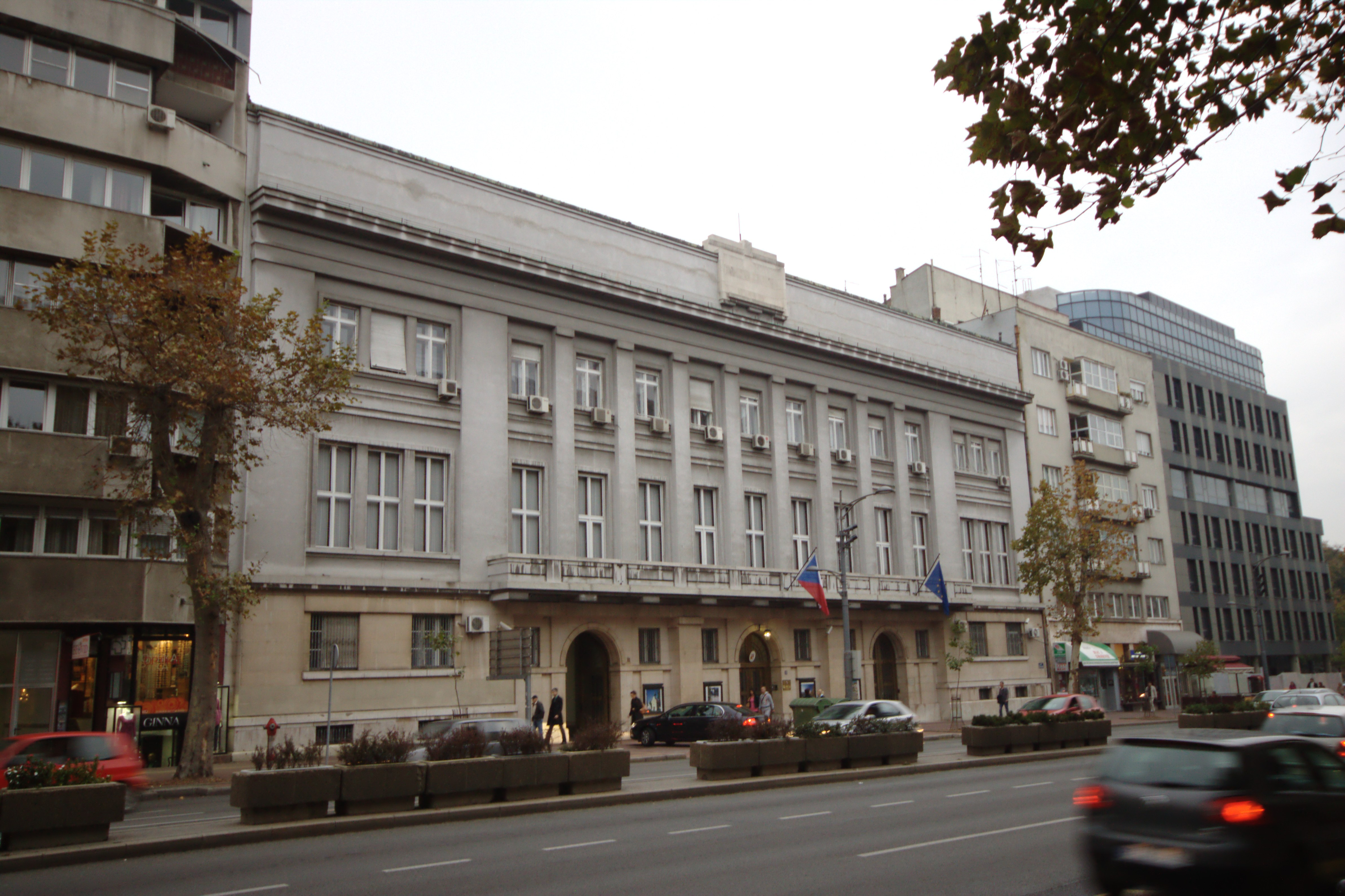
Embassy of the Czech Republic

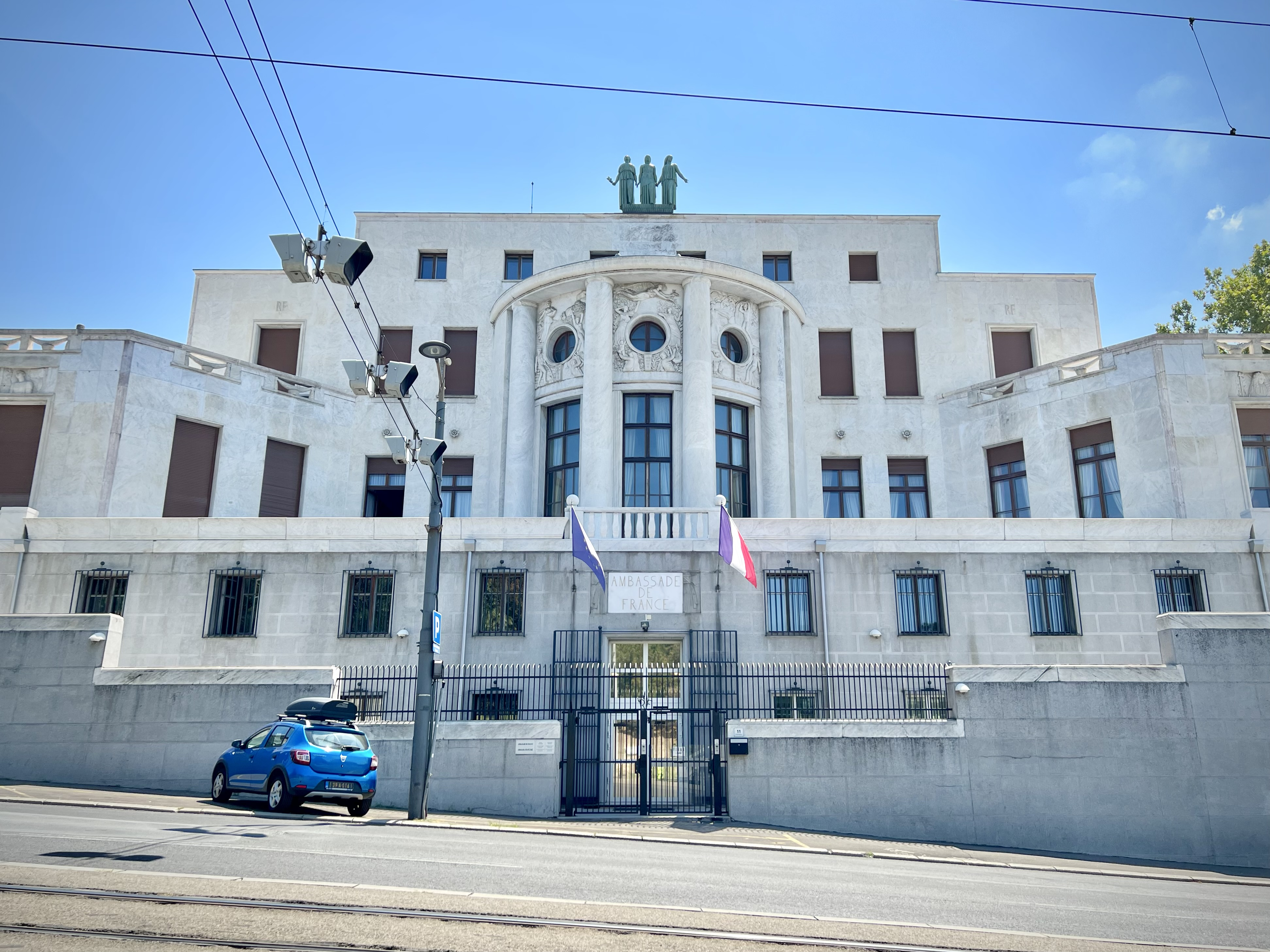
Embassy of France

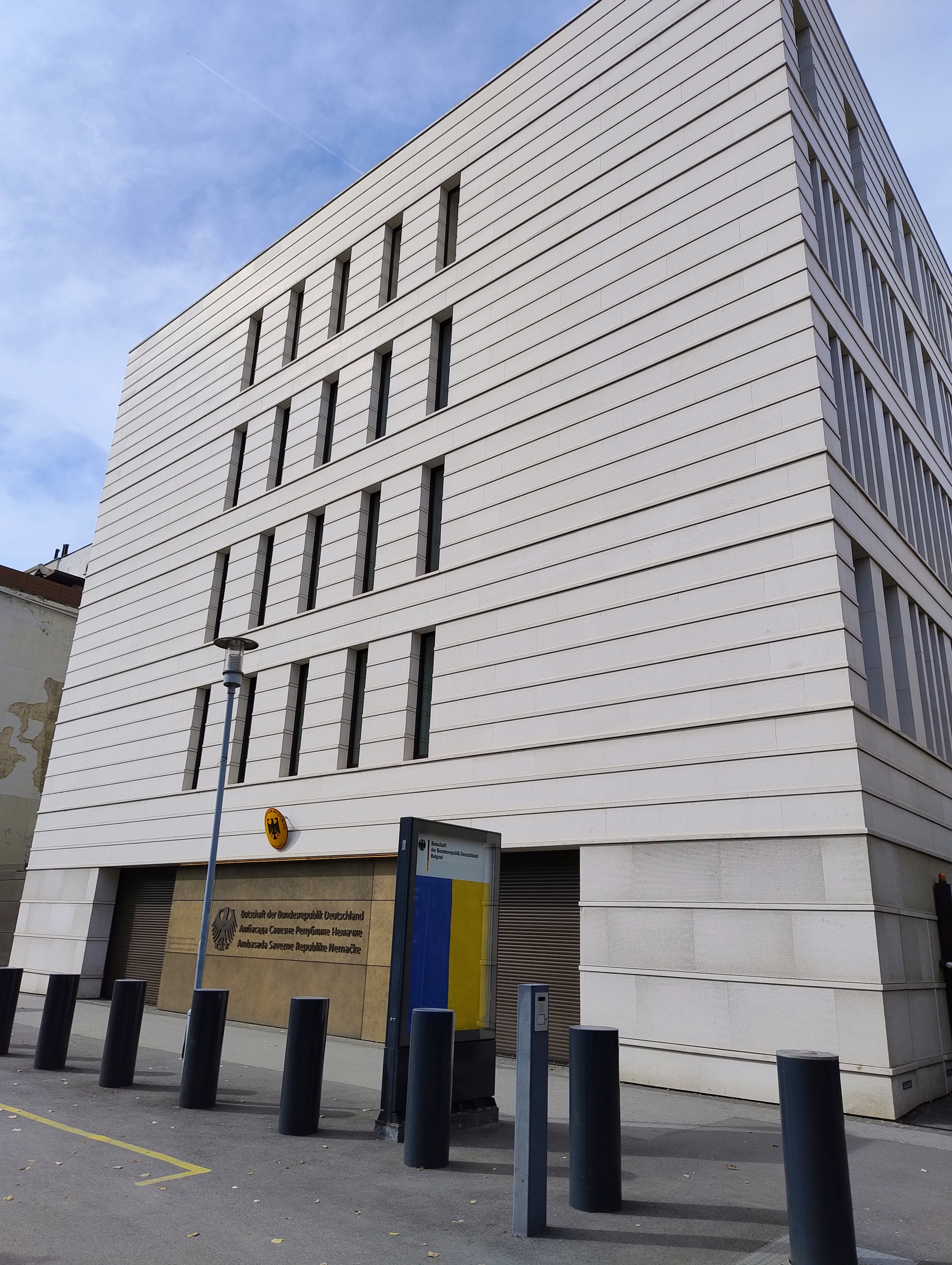
Embassy of Germany

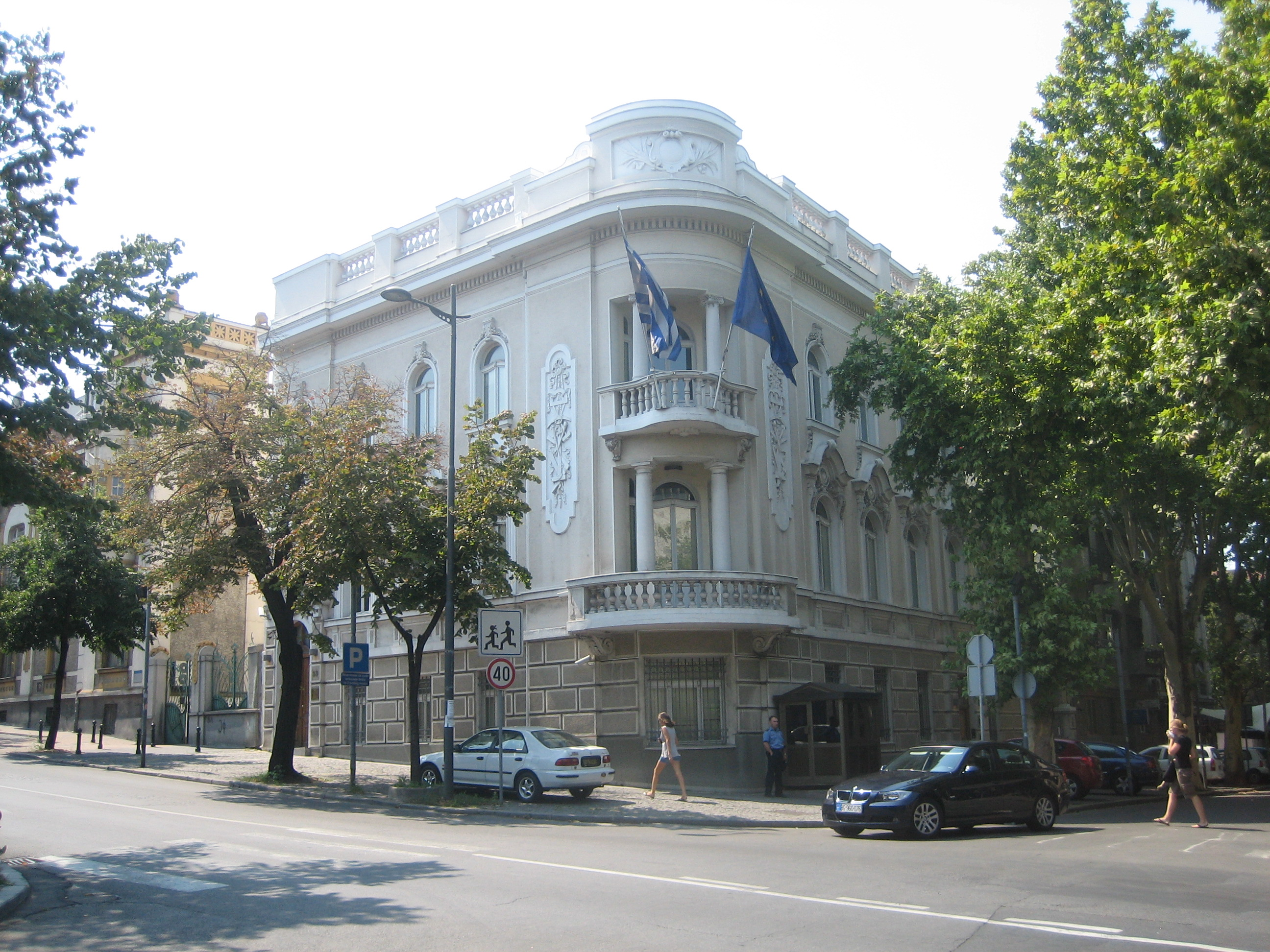
Embassy of Greece

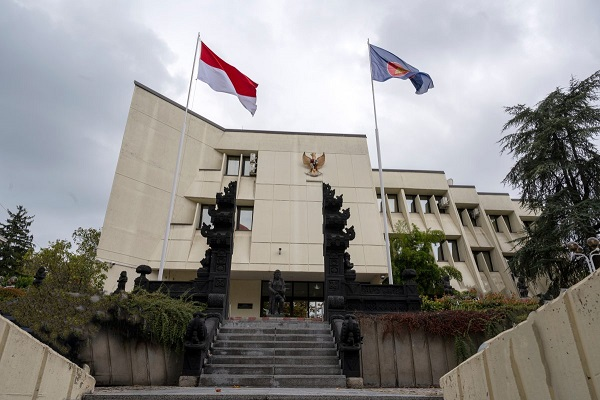
Embassy of Indonesia

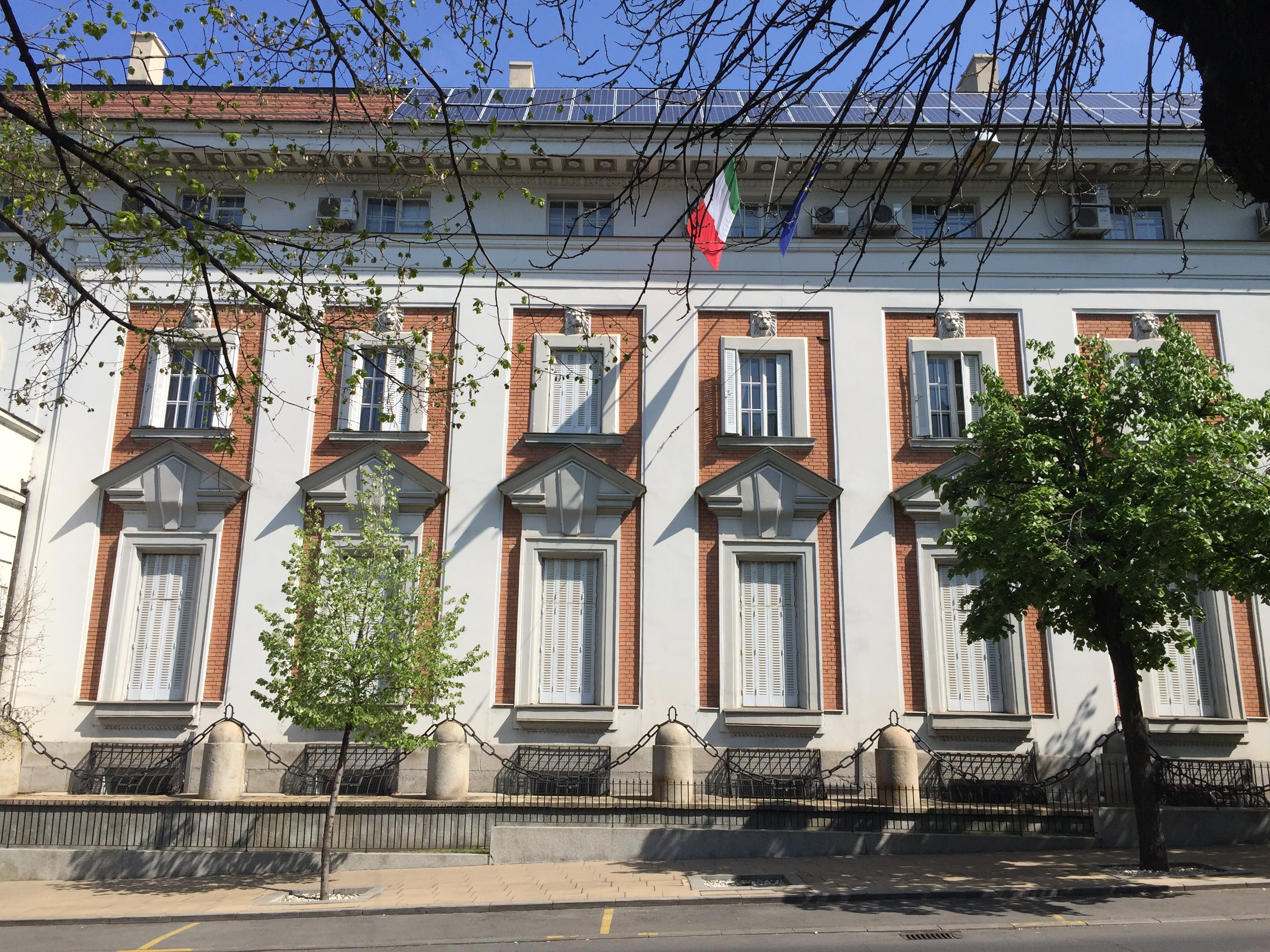
Embassy of Italy

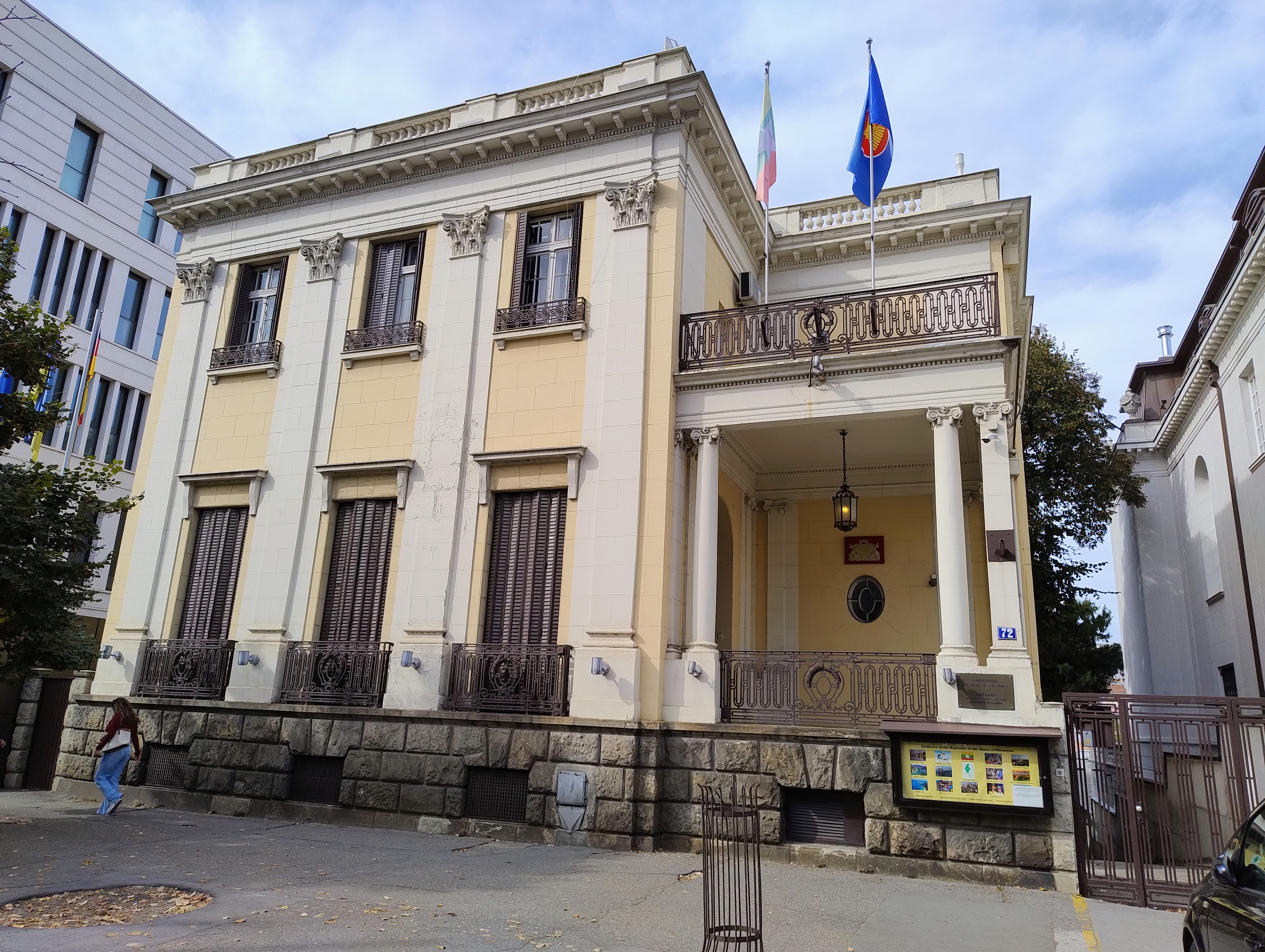
Embassy of Myanmar

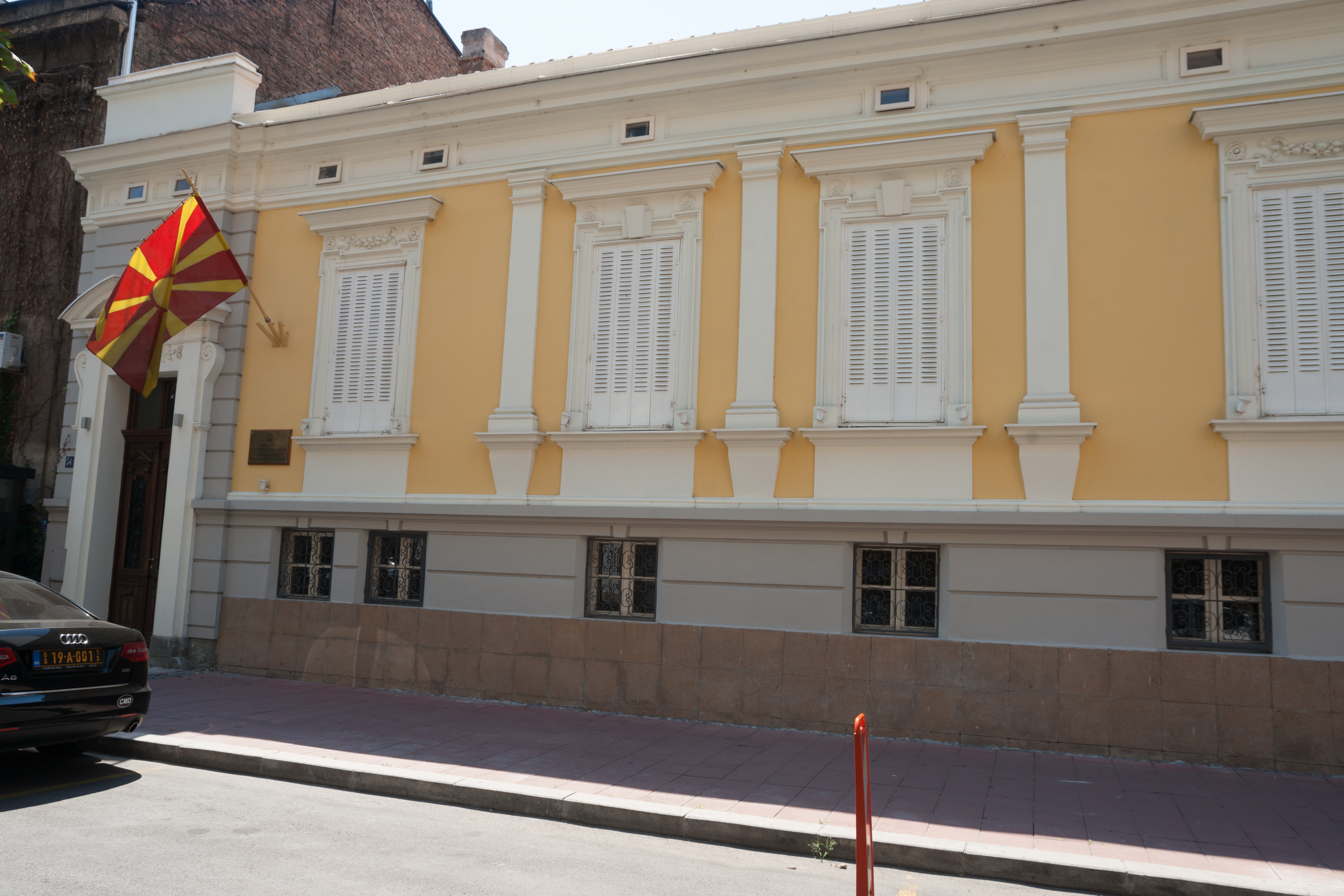
Embassy of North Macedonia

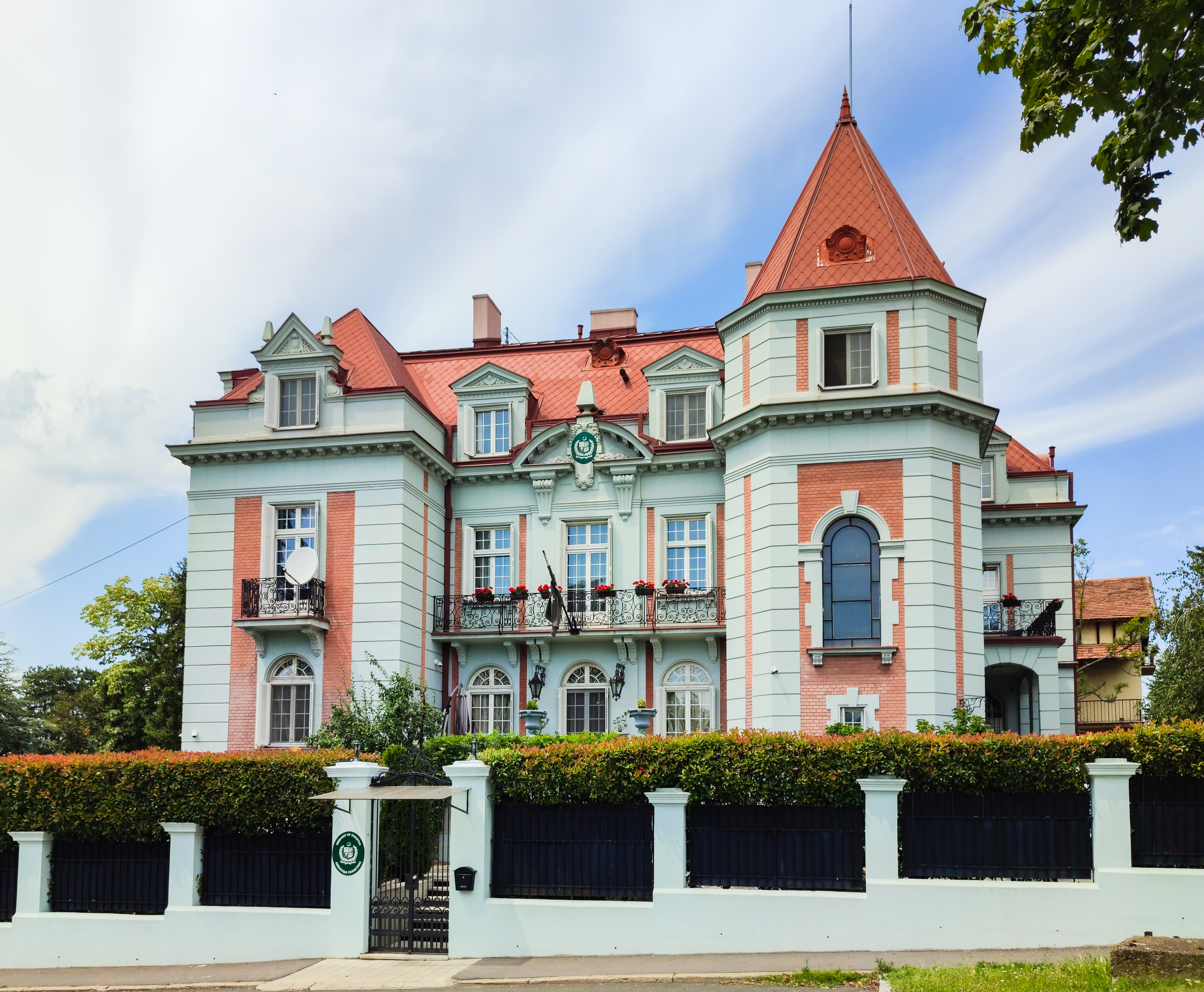
Embassy of Pakistan

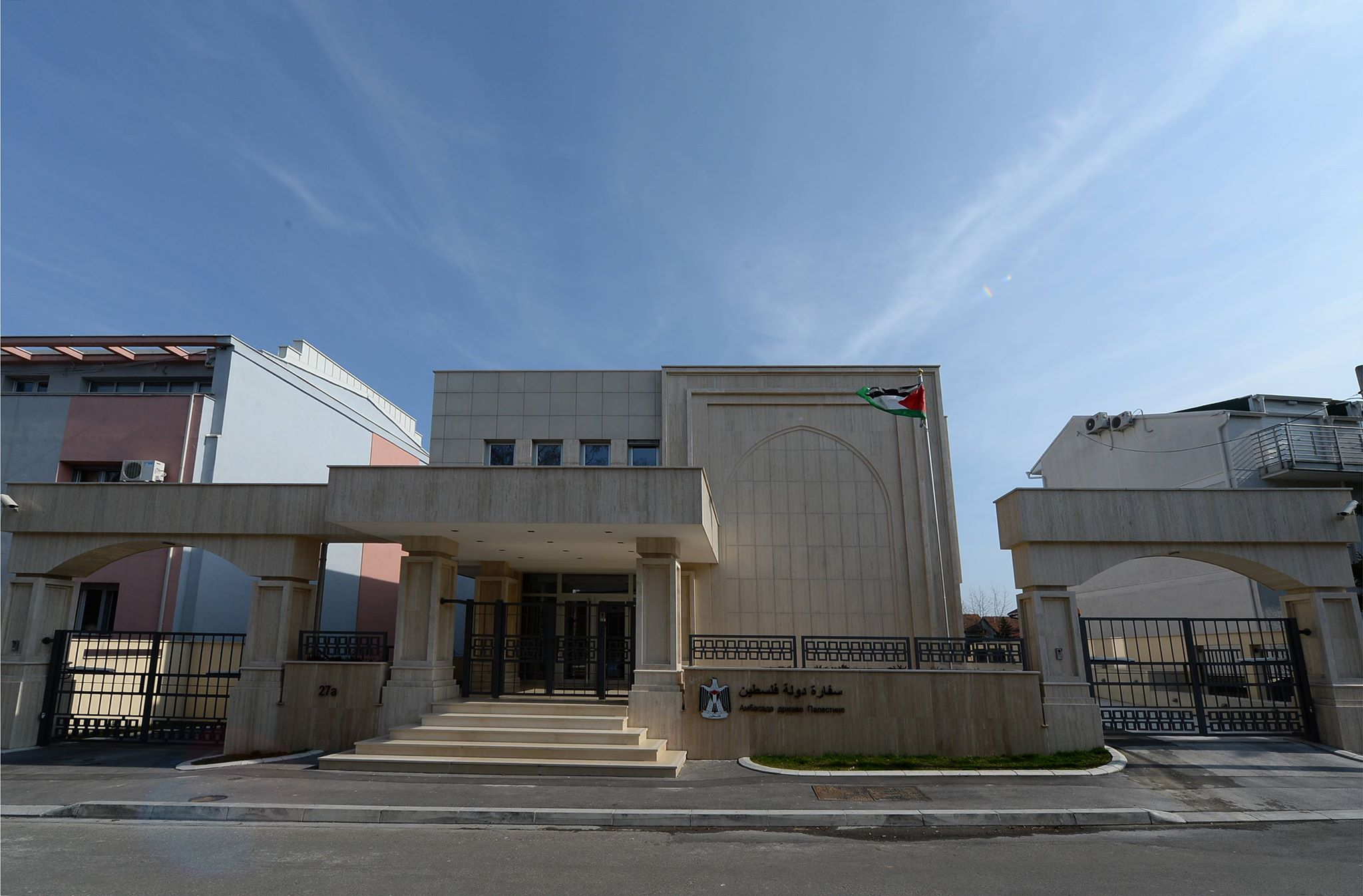
Embassy of Palestine

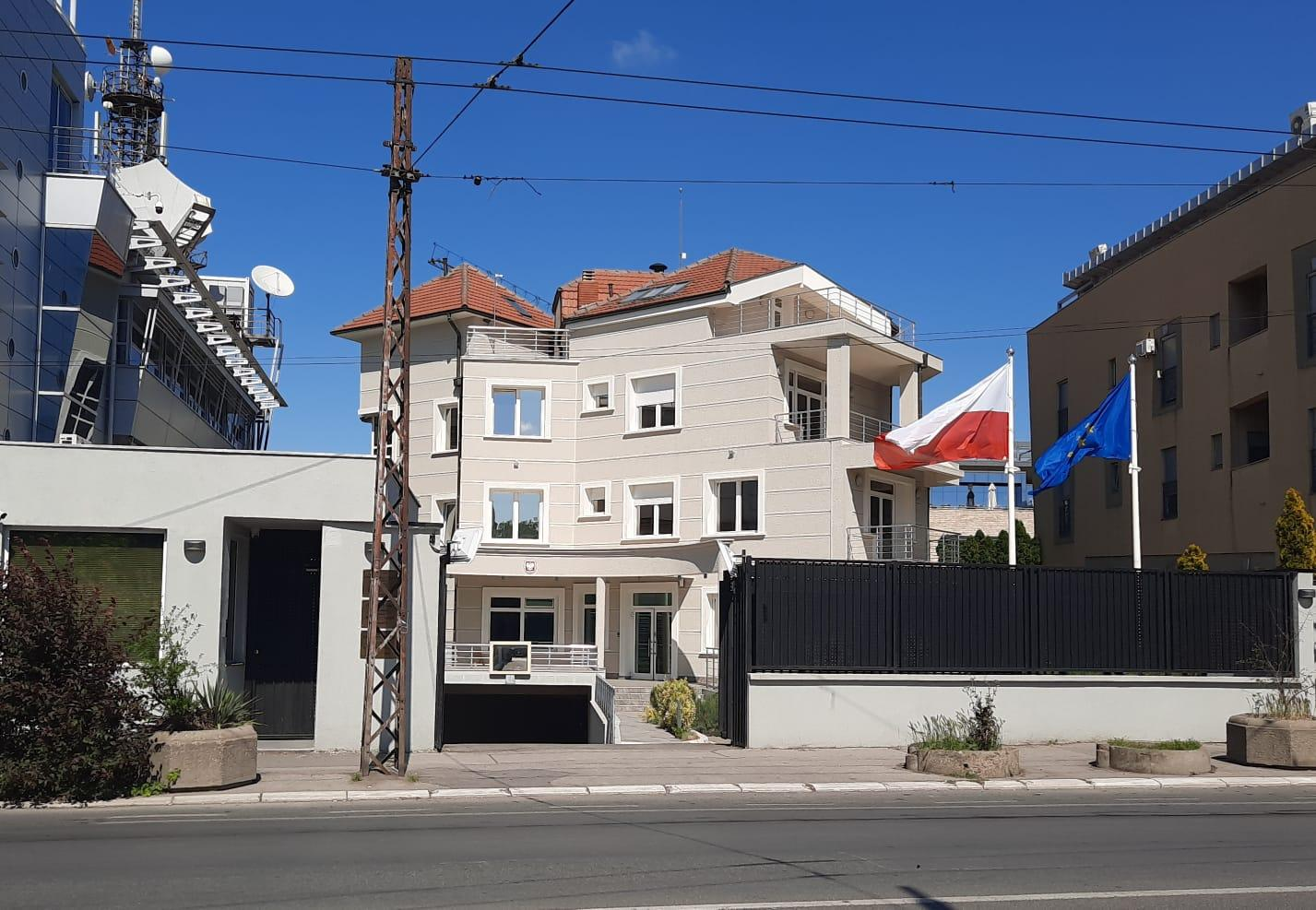
Embassy of Poland

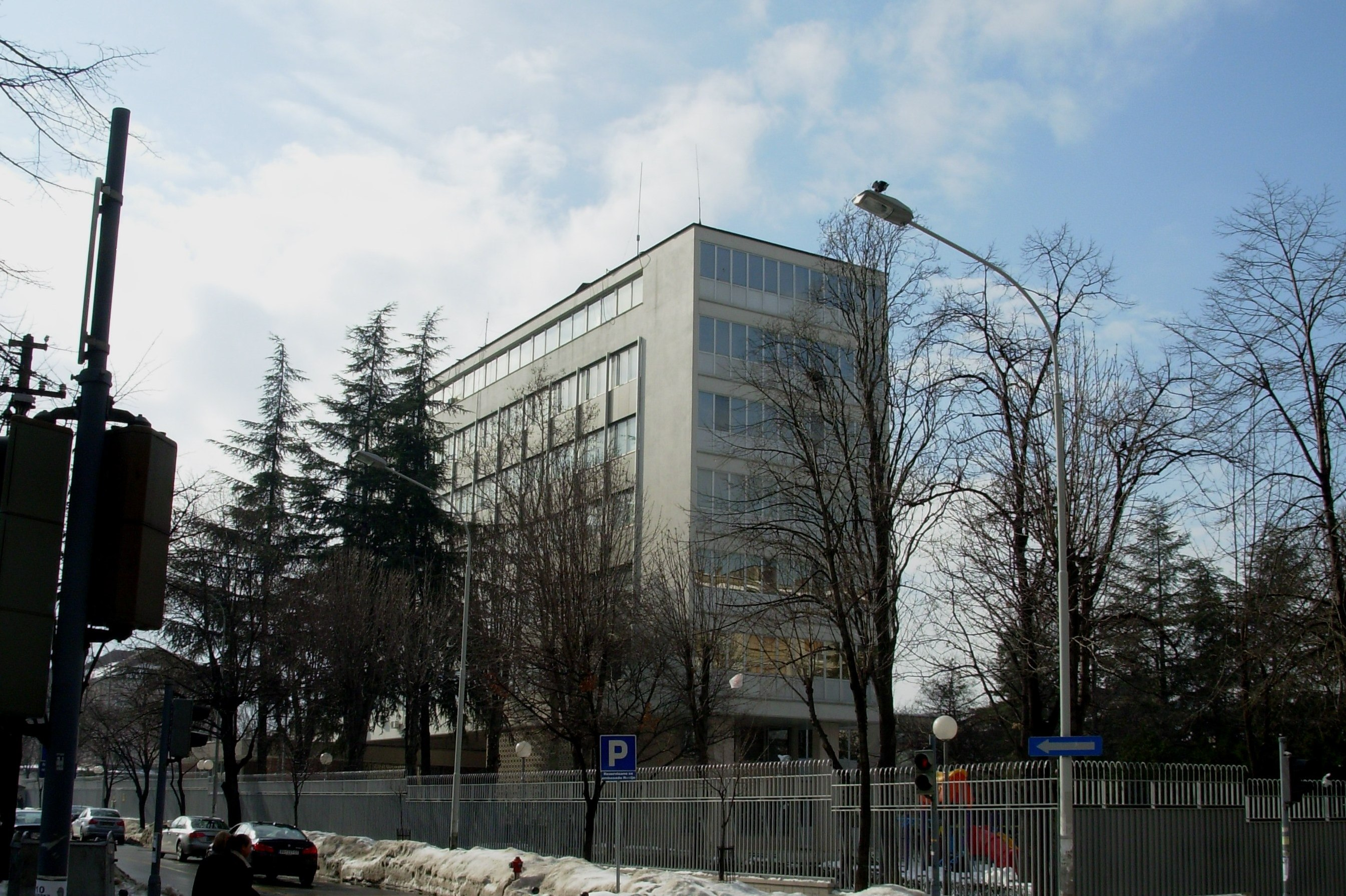
Embassy of Russia

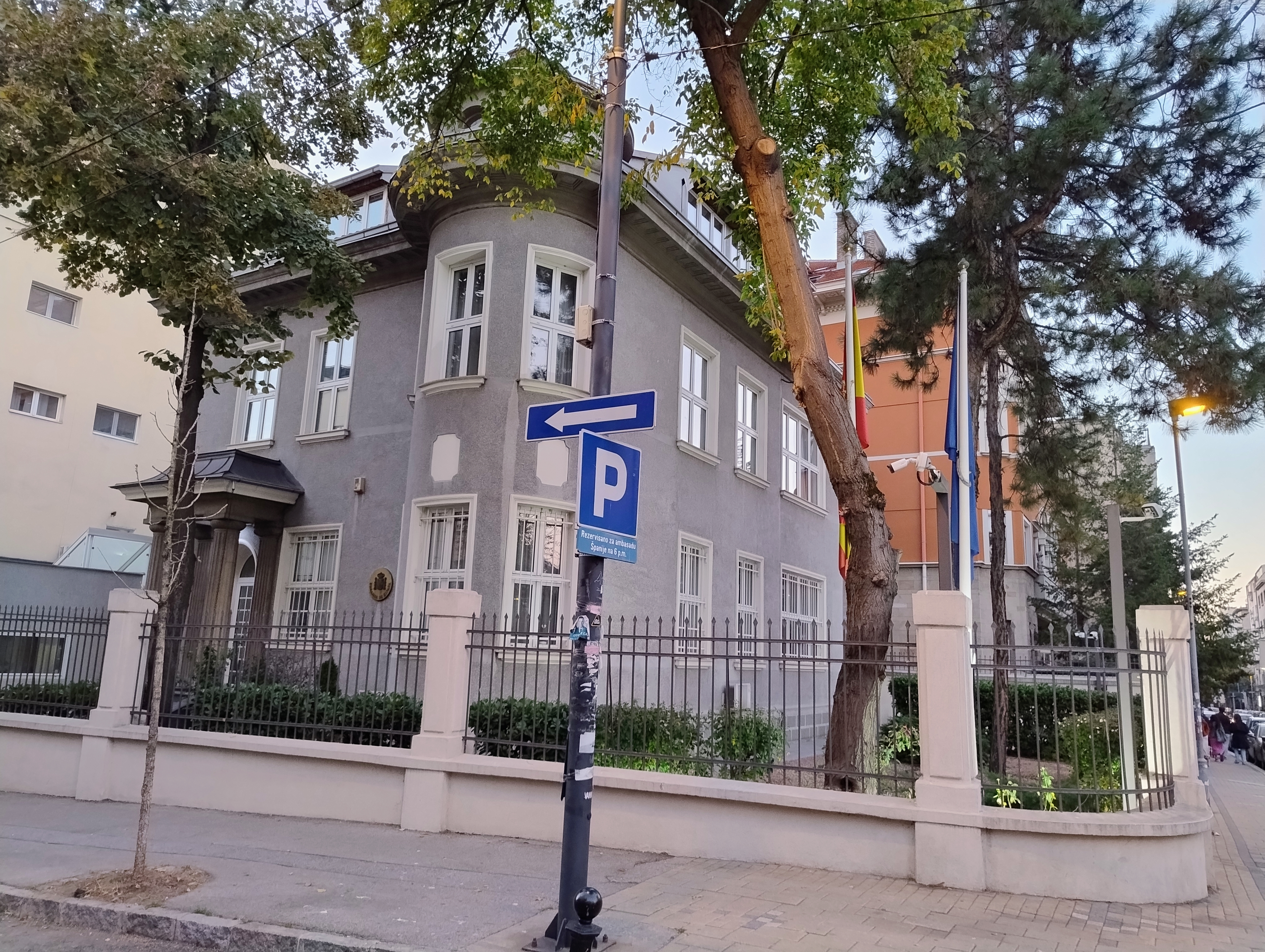
Embassy of Spain

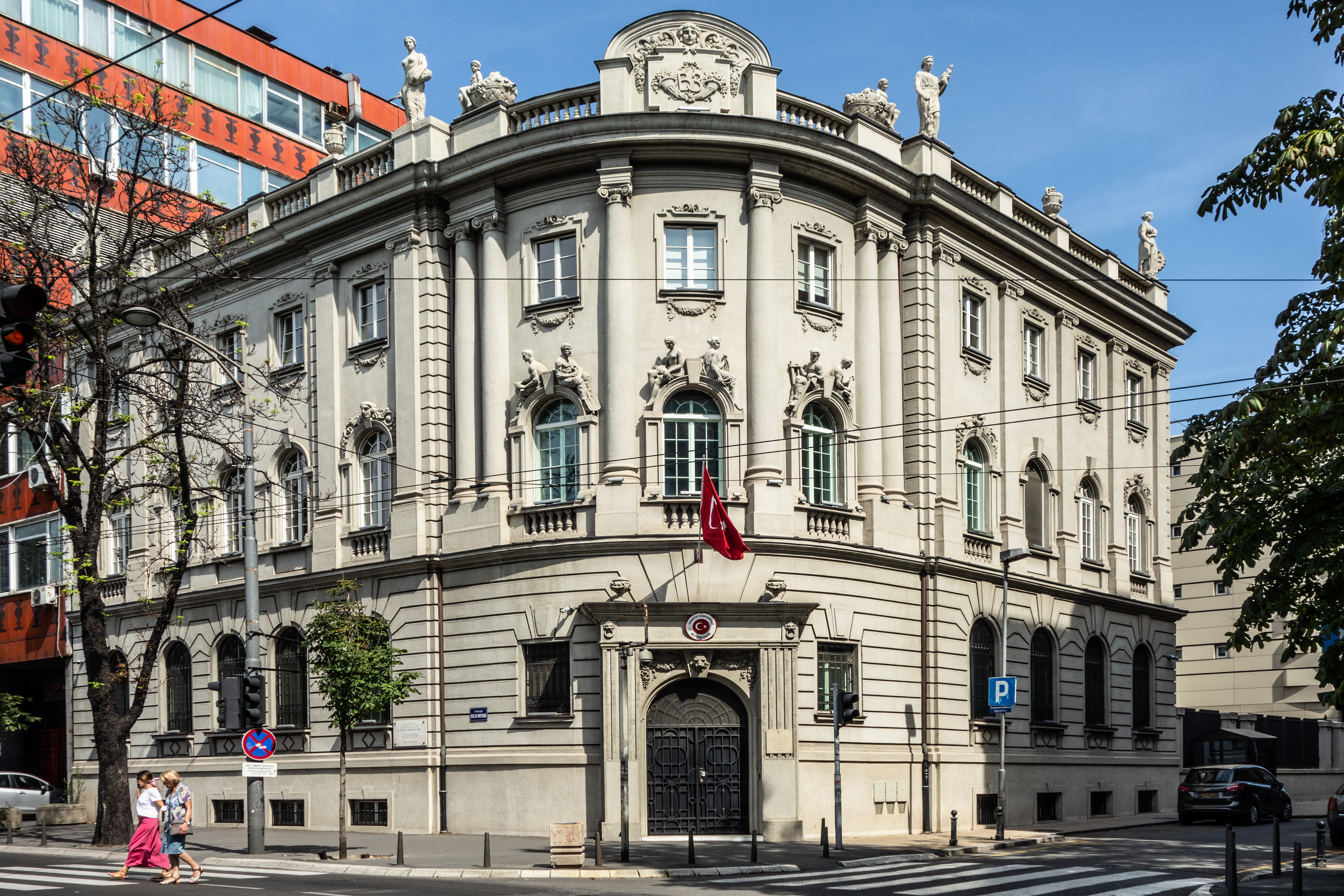
Embassy of Turkey

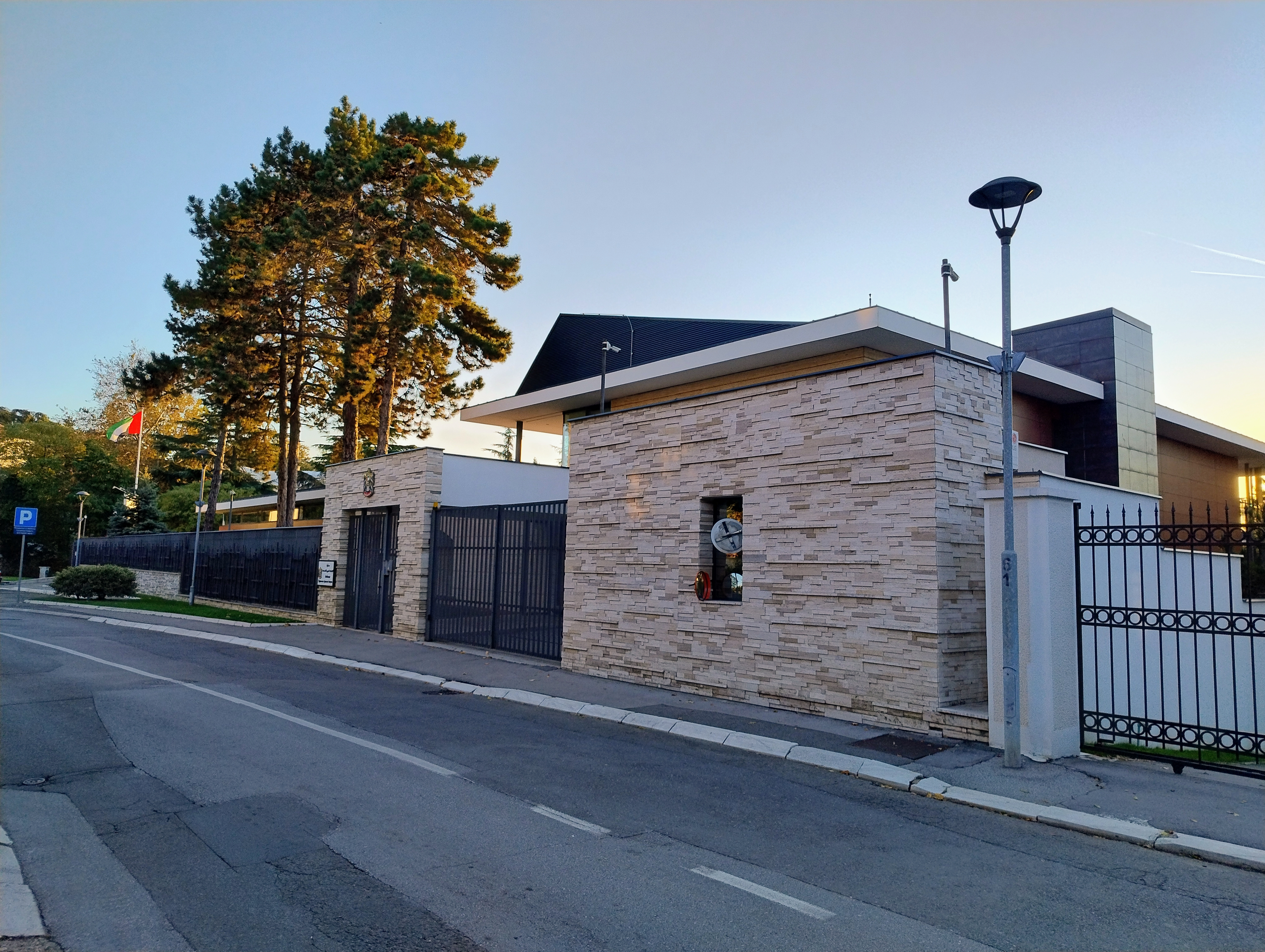
Embassy of the United Arab Emirates

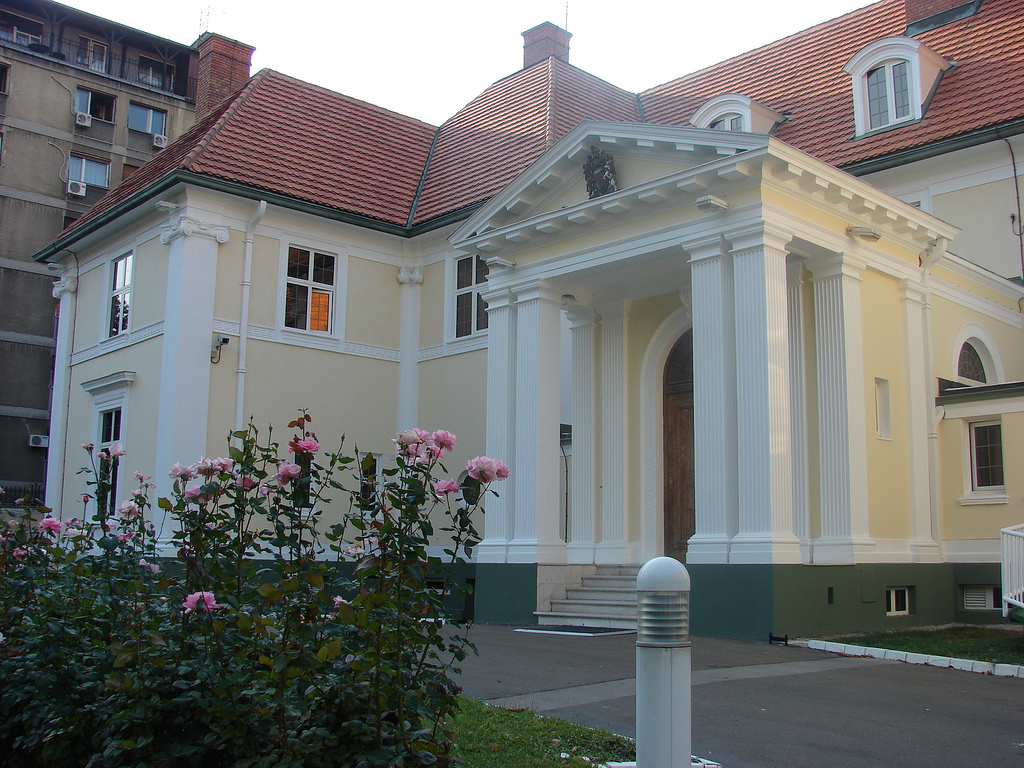
Embassy of the United Kingdom

== Embassies to open ==
- Bahrain
- Saudi Arabia

== Consular missions ==
The following cities host career consulates from neighboring Balkan countries. All entries are consulates-general unless otherwise indicated.

=== Niš ===
1. Bulgaria
2. Turkey (Consular office)

=== Novi Pazar ===
1. Bosnia and Herzegovina
2. Turkey

=== Sremski Karlovci ===
1. Montenegro

=== Subotica ===
1. Croatia
2. Hungary

=== Vršac ===
1. Romania

=== Zaječar ===
1. Romania

== Non-resident embassies accredited to Serbia ==
=== Resident in Athens, Greece ===
1. Chile
2. Georgia
3. Jordan
4. Latvia
5. Panama
6. South Africa
7. Thailand

=== Resident in Berlin, Germany ===
1. Cameroon
2. Iceland
3. Jamaica
4. Malawi
5. Maldives
6. Nepal
7. Niger
8. Senegal

=== Resident in Brussels, Belgium ===
1. Bhutan
2. Cape Verde
3. Central African Republic
4. Eswatini
5. Gambia
6. Guyana
7. Liberia
8. São Tomé and Príncipe
9. Vanuatu

=== Resident in Bucharest, Romania ===
1. Moldova
2. North Korea
3. Sudan
4. Uruguay
5. Vietnam

=== Resident in Budapest, Hungary ===
1. Colombia
2. Ecuador
3. Estonia
4. Laos
5. Lithuania
6. Mongolia
7. Peru
8. Philippines

=== Resident in London, United Kingdom ===
1. Bahamas
2. Botswana
3. Papua New Guinea
4. Saint Vincent and the Grenadines

=== Resident in Moscow, Russia ===
1. Bahrain
2. Grenada
3. Guinea-Bissau
4. Kyrgyzstan
5. Madagascar
6. Mauritius
7. Oman
8. Rwanda
9. Sierra Leone
10. Tajikistan
11. Turkmenistan

=== Resident in Paris, France ===
1. Comoros
2. Kenya
3. Seychelles
4. Togo
5. Zambia

=== Resident in Rome, Italy ===
1. Bangladesh
2. Bolivia
3. Burundi
4. Equatorial Guinea
5. Eritrea
6. Ethiopia
7. Guatemala
8. Lesotho
9. Mali
10. Mauritania
11. New Zealand
12. Paraguay
13. Tanzania
14. Uganda
15. Yemen
16. Zimbabwe

=== Resident in Vienna, Austria ===
1. Ivory Coast
2. Namibia
3. Nicaragua
4. Sri Lanka
5. Uzbekistan

=== Resident in Washington, D.C., United States ===
1. Antigua and Barbuda
2. Dominica
3. Saint Kitts and Nevis
4. Saint Lucia
5. Trinidad and Tobago

=== Resident in New York City, United States ===
1. Fiji
2. Nauru
3. Solomon Islands
4. Timor-Leste
5. Tonga
6. Tuvalu

=== Resident elsewhere ===
1. Afghanistan (Sofia)
2. Andorra (Andorra la Vella)
3. Armenia (Prague)
4. Brunei (Bandar Seri Begawan)
5. Haiti (Havana)
6. Luxembourg (Luxembourg City)
7. Malta (Valletta)
8. Palau (Tokyo)
9. San Marino (City of San Marino)
10. Saudi Arabia (Sarajevo)
11. Singapore (Singapore)
12. Suriname (Paramaribo)

== Closed embassies ==
- Bolivia (closed in 1992)
- Colombia (closed in February 1994)
- Ecuador (closed in 1992)
- Ethiopia (closed in 1992)
- Gabon (closed in 1992)
- Guinea (closed in 2023)
- Jordan (Note: Resident in Athens, Attica, Greece)
- Niger (Note: Resident in Berlin, Germany)
- Nigeria
- Peru (Note: Resident in Budapest, Hungary)
- San Marino (Note: Resident in City of San Marino, San Marino)
- Sudan (closed in 1992)
- Vietnam (Note: Resident in Bucharest, Romania)
- Zambia (closed in 1992)
- Zimbabwe (closed in 2006; to be reopened) (Note: Resident in Rome, Lazio, Italy)

== See also ==
- Foreign relations of Serbia
- List of diplomatic missions of Serbia
- Visa requirements for Serbian citizens
