= Civil Aviation Directorate of the Republic of Serbia =

Civil aviation authority of Serbia

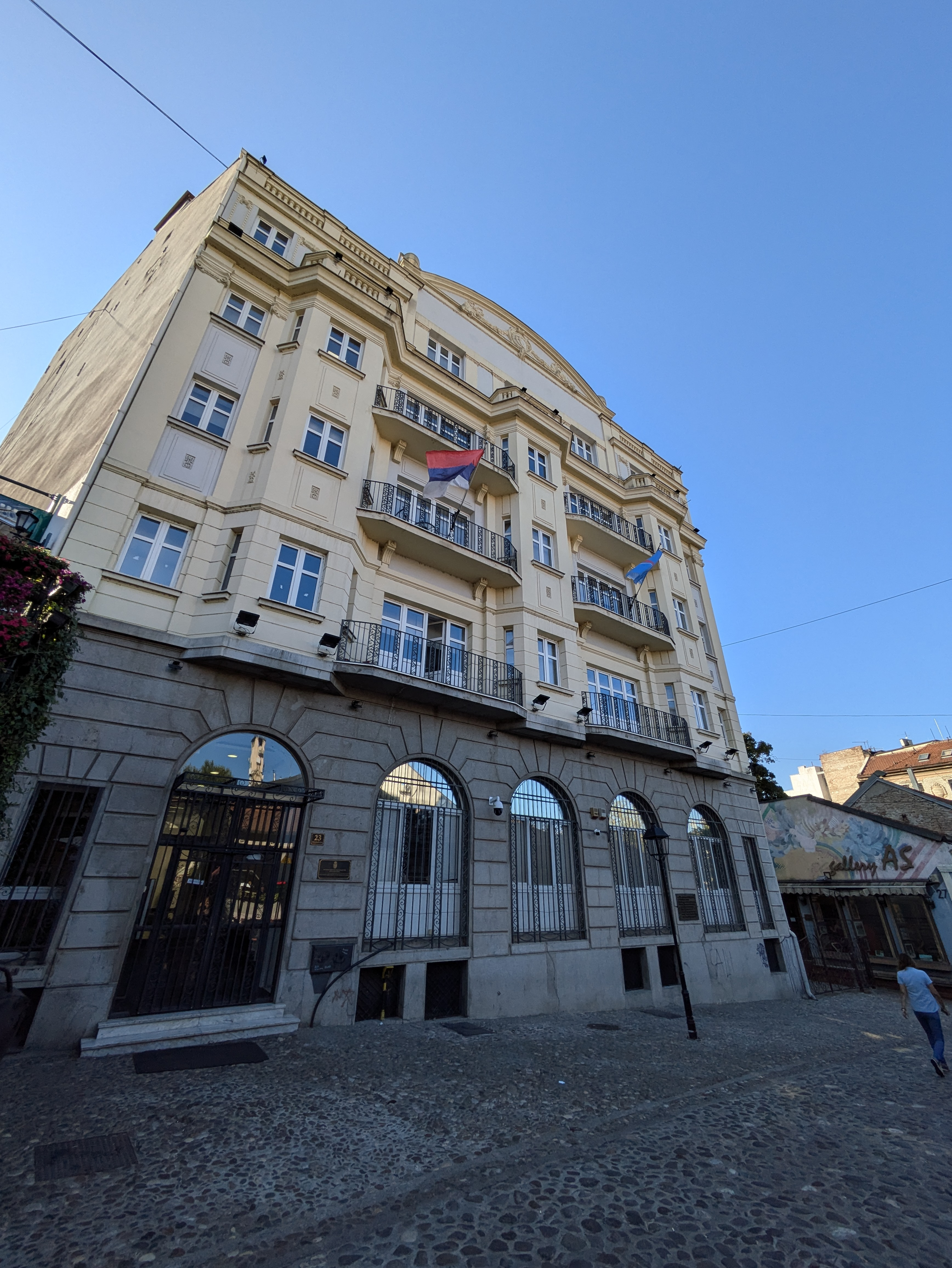

The Civil Aviation Directorate of the Republic of Serbia (Serbian: Директорат цивилног ваздухопловства Републике Србије, romanized: Direktorat civilnog vazduhoplovstva Republike Srbije) is the civil aviation authority of Serbia.

The Accidents and Incidents Investigation and Risks Analysis Office investigates aviation accidents and incidents.
