= Embassy of the United Kingdom, Belgrade =

UK diplomatic mission

British Embassy, Belgrade
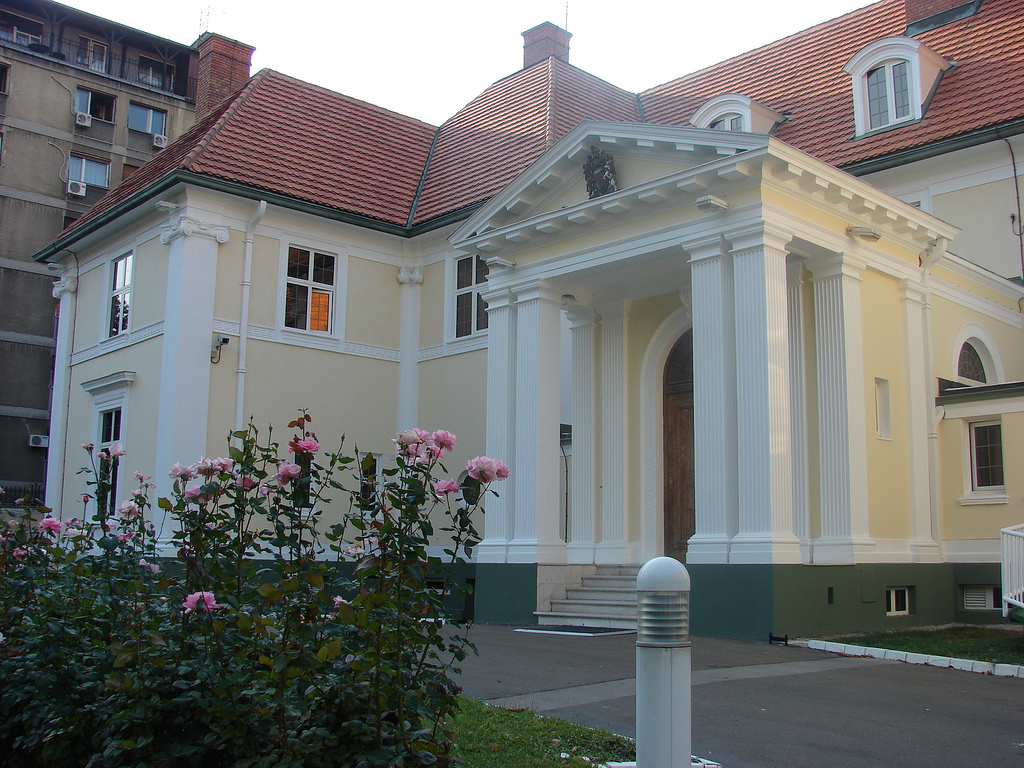
- Location: Belgrade, Serbia
- Address: Resavska 46
- Coordinates: 44°48′12″N 20°27′35″E
- Ambassador: Edward Ferguson
- Website: British Embassy, Belgrade

The Embassy of the United Kingdom in Belgrade is the chief diplomatic mission of the United Kingdom in Serbia. It also represents the British Overseas Territories in Serbia.

== History ==
The original British legation house in Belgrade was located 22 Gračanička Street however as the importance of the mission grew and the volume of consular and commercial activity it outgrew its building. The embassy move into leased space at No. 42 in the same street in the mid-1930s. After the World War II this building was again thoroughly overcrowded. In 1951, the adjacent site at No. 44, was bought from the Serbian government. The lease on No. 42 was given up in the late-1970s. The current Embassy is located at Resavska 46.

== Ambassador's residence ==
During visit of Yugoslav President Tito to Britain in 1953 the foreign secretary, Sir Anthony Eden, spoke to him about the British Embassy's accommodation needs in Belgrade and, as a result, the Yugoslav government offered a site for a new residence, which was accepted in 1955.

The British Ambassador's residence in Belgrade, “Elsie Inglis House”, is named after Elsie Inglis, a doctor and campaigner for women's suffrage and founder of the Scottish Women's Hospitals in Serbia. The renaming ceremony took place on International Women's Day in 2015 and was conducted by the President of Serbia Tomislav Nikolić and then UK Ambassador Denis Keefe.

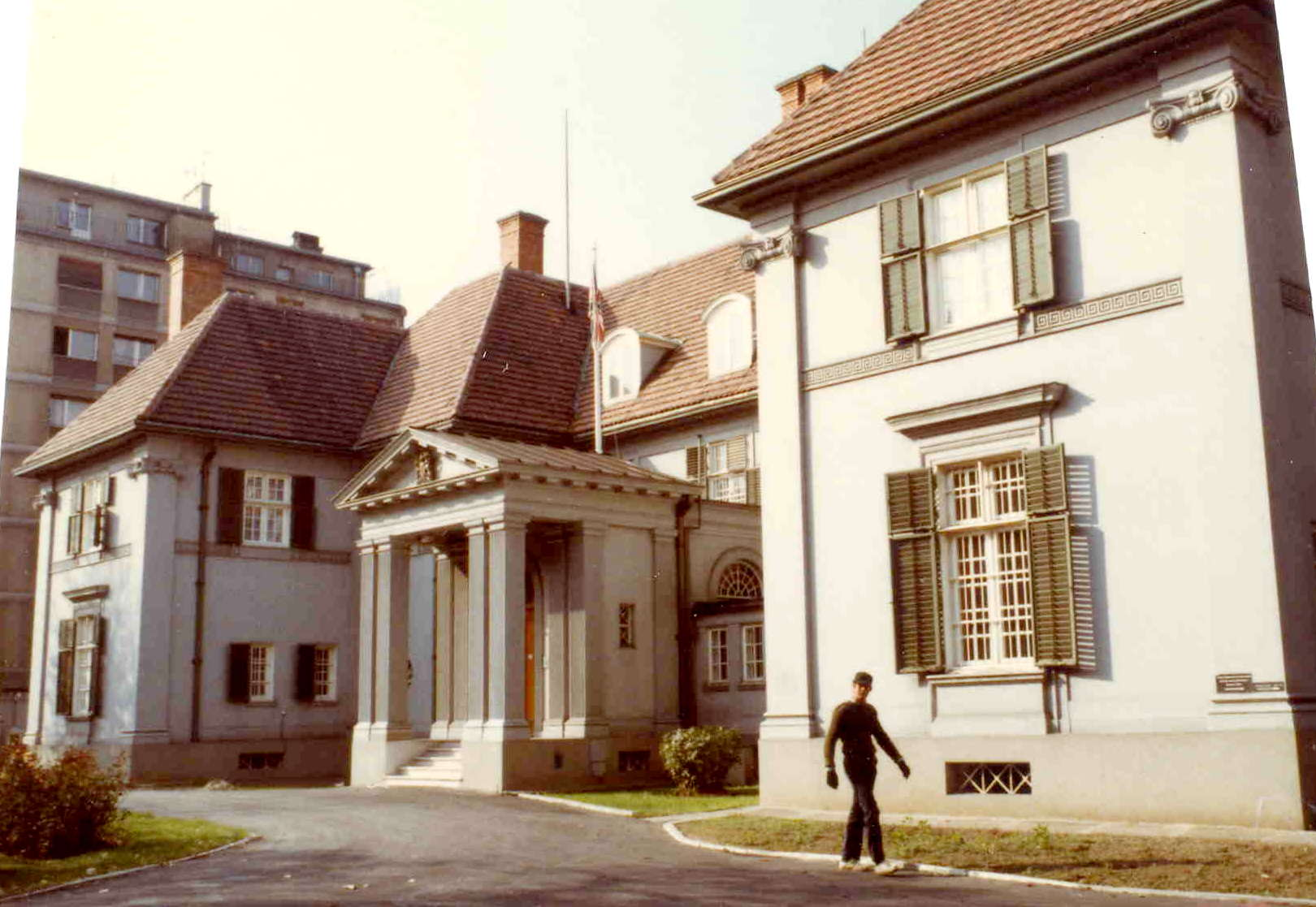
British Embassy in Belgrade, 1982

== See also ==
- Serbia–United Kingdom relations
- List of diplomatic missions in Serbia
- List of ambassadors of the United Kingdom to Serbia
