= List of Albanians in Serbia =

This is a list of notable Albanians in Serbia, ethnic Albanians who were born in, lived, or trace their origins to the territory that is present-day Serbia.

== History and politics ==
- Tahir Efendi Jakova – religious leader
- Kenan Evren – politician and military officer, the 7th president of Turkey
- Branko Merxhani – sociologist, writer, journalist, and literary critic
- Aćif Hadžiahmetović – politician
- Ahmet Daca – politician
- Ali Šukrija – politician
- Ali Aliu – writer, economist, teacher, politician
- Nexhat Daci – politician
- Fatmir Hasani – politician
- Shaip Kamberi – politician
- Riza Halimi – politician
- Shqiprim Arifi – politician
- Ardita Sinani – politician
- Ahmedin Škrijelj – politician
- Amina Nuraj, (sq), activist from Novi Pazar
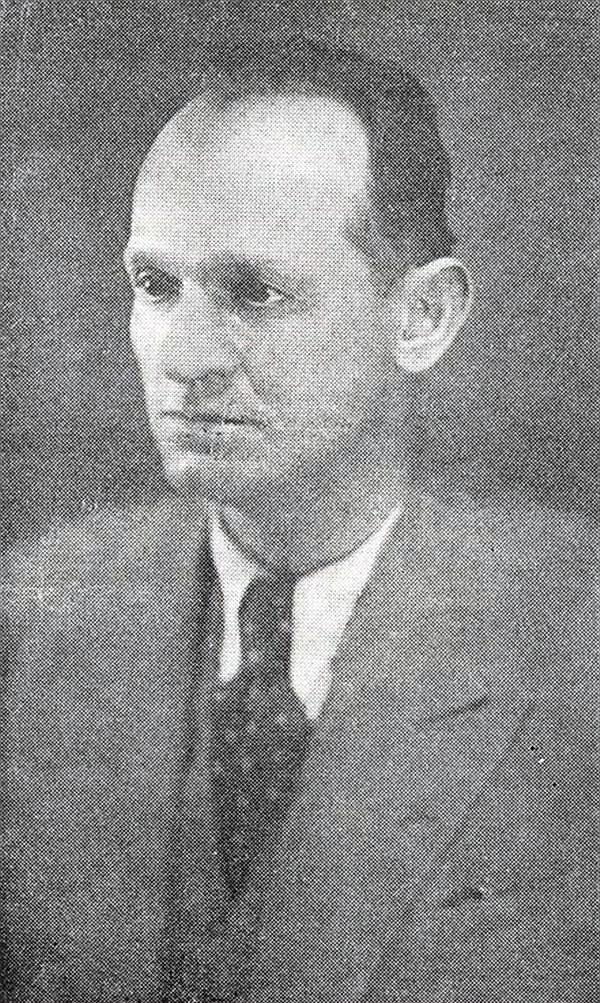
Aćif Hadžiahmetović

== Military ==
- Idriz Seferi – guerrilla fighter
- Mazarek – nobleman
- Džemail Koničanin – military commander
- Hatidža Beriša – professor
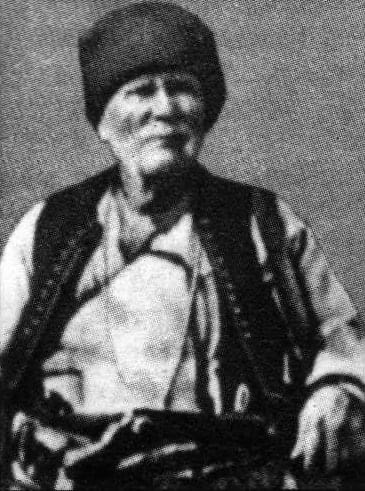
Idriz Seferi

== Cinema ==
- Bekim Fehmiu – actor
- Faruk Begoli – actor
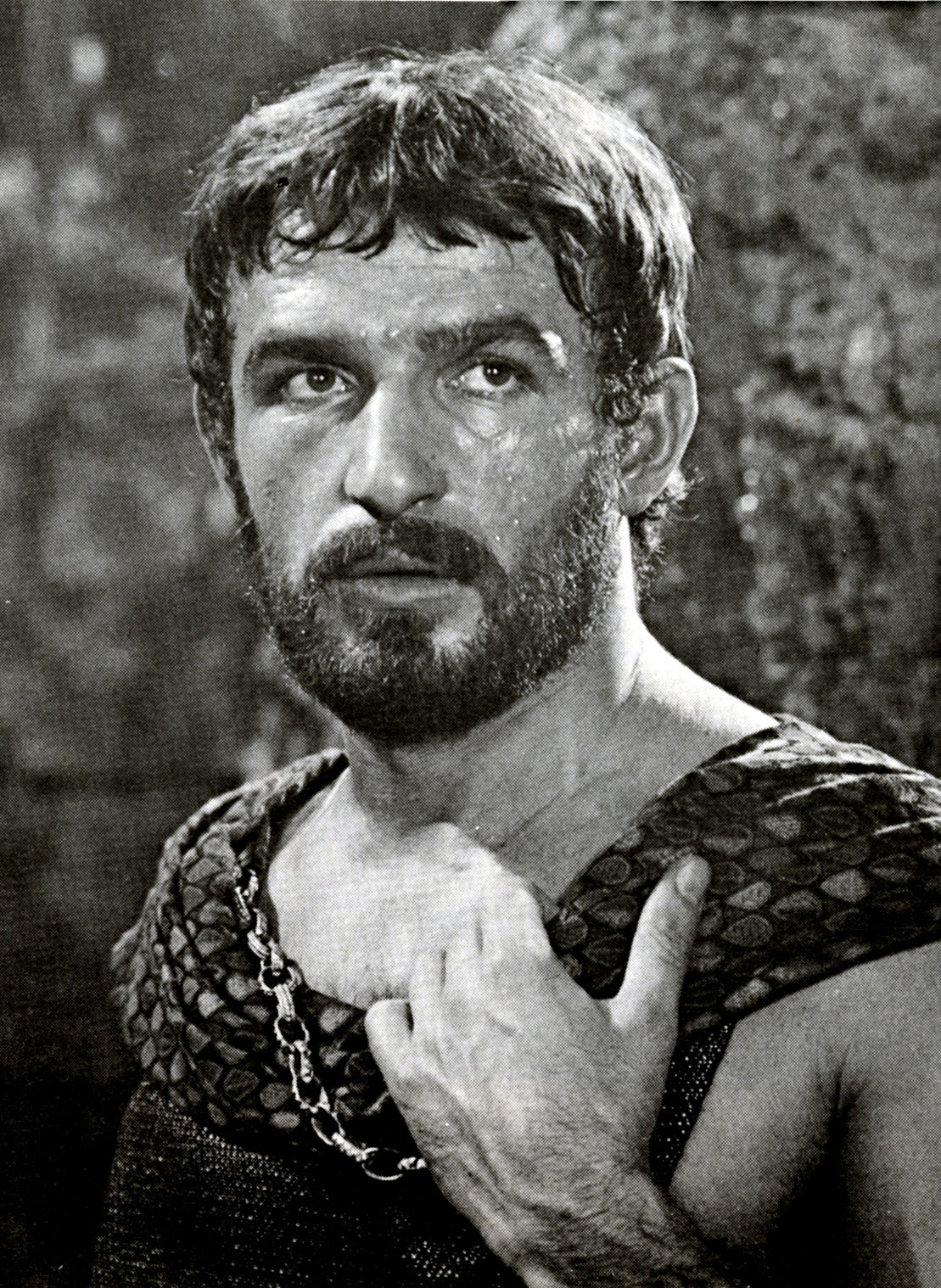
Bekim Fehmiu

== Arts and entertainment ==
- Fahri Beqiri – composer
- Edita Aradinović – pop singer
- Zana Nimani – pop singer
- Đorđe Đogani – singer
- Merima Njegomir – folk singer

== Media ==
- Mirko Gashi – poet

== Sports ==
- Atdhe Nuhiu – football player
- Berat Djimsiti – footballer
- Fidan Aliti – football player
- Astrit Ajdarević – football player
- Alfred Ajdarević – football player
- Gjelbrim Taipi – football player
- Betim Fazliji – football player
- Arton Zekaj – football player
- Faton Xhemaili – football player
- Leutrim Pajaziti – football player
- Arbnor Fejzullahu – football player
- Iljasa Zulfiu – football player
- Suad Sahiti – football player
- Emir Sahiti – football player
- Ervin Kurti – football player
- Mimoza Hamidi – football player
- Muamer Hukaj - boxer

== See also ==
- Albanians in Serbia
