= Leutrim Pajaziti =

Serbian-born Albanian footballer

Leotrim Pajaziti
Personal information
- Full name: Leotrim Pajaziti
- Date of birth: 8 July 1993 (age 33)
- Place of birth: Preševo, FR Yugoslavia
- Position: Attacking midfielder

Team information
- Current team: ERC Hoeilaart

Youth career
- 2005–2010: Tërnoci
- 2011–2012: Teuta Durrës

Senior career*
Years	Team	Apps	(Gls)
2010–2011	Tërnoci		(19)
2012–2013	Teuta	8	(1)
2013–2014	Drita		
2014–2017	Racing Jet Wavre		
2017–2018	Tienen		
2018–2019	Meux		
2019–2020	Rebecquoise		
2021-2022	Union Namur		
2022–2023	RUW Ciney		
2023–2024	Diest		
2024–	ERC Hoeilaart		
- * Club domestic league appearances and goals

Leotrim Pajaziti (born 8 July 1993) is a Serbian-born Albanian professional footballer who plays for Belgian club ERC Hoeilaart as an offensive midfielder.

== Career ==
=== Early career ===
Pajaziti was born in the town in Preševo in FR Yugoslavia but he moved as a young child to Sweden, where he began to play football for local amateur teams. He moved back to Serbia where he joined the local ethnic Albanian team KF Tërnoci (FK Trnovac) in Veliki Trnovac. He moved up the ranks within the club and he eventually became an important member of the first team alongside the likes of Gjelbrim Taipi and Arbnor Fejzullahu in the Pčinjska Liga, scoring 19 goals for the club in total.

=== Teuta Durrës ===
Pajaziti joined Albanian Superliga side Teuta Durrës in January 2012, linking up with the team at their winter training camp in Antalya, Turkey.

=== Belgium ===
In 2014, Pajaziti moved to Belgium to play amateur football for Racing Jet Wavre and later Tienen. In summer 2019 he left Meux, whom he had joined from Tienen a year earlier, for Rebecquoise. In summer 2024, Pajaziti joined Hoeilaart from Diest.
