= Demo Beriša =

Serbian politician (born 1963)

- Демо Бериша
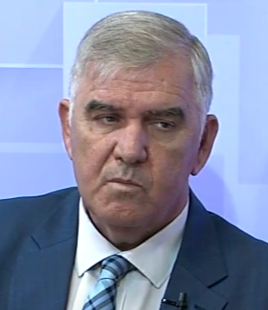
- Beriša in 2023

Minister of Human and Minority Rights and Social Dialogue
- Incumbent
- Assumed office 16 April 2025
- Prime Minister: Đuro Macut
- Preceded by: Tomislav Žigmanov

Personal details
- Born: 17 April 1963 (age 63) Peć, SAP Kosovo, SR Serbia, SFR Yugoslavia
- Party: Independent
- Other political affiliations: People's Movement for the State
- Children: 2
- Education: University of Novi Sad

Military service
- Allegiance: Yugoslavia; Serbia and Montenegro
- Branch: Yugoslav People's Army; Yugoslav Army
- Service years: 1982–2005
- Rank: Military police officer

Demo Beriša (Serbian Cyrillic: Демо Бериша, Albanian: Demo Berisha; born 17 April 1963) is a Serbian retired military officer serving as the minister of human and minority rights and social dialogue since 16 April 2025. An ethnic Kosovo Albanian, he opposes the recognition of Kosovo.

== Early life and career ==
Beriša was born in 1963 in a Kosovo Albanian family in Peć, SAP Kosovo, SR Serbia, SFR Yugoslavia. He graduated from a military school in Sarajevo and later continued his studies in Novi Sad, where he earned a degree in economics.

He served as an officer in the military police branch of the Yugoslav People's Army and the Serbian Army, retiring in 2005. Since 2014, Beriša has served as the president of the Matica of Albanians. The association works to improve relations between Serbs and Albanians, and also focuses on preserving the Albanian language and culture, as well as promoting literacy among Albanians in Vojvodina. The association publishes the first Serbian-Albanian bilingual magazine and also engaged in humanitarian activities. Beriša and his association maintain cooperation with the Embassy of Albania in Belgrade Matica of Albanians has had all its bank accounts blocked since 2019.

== Political activities ==
Since 2023, Beriša has been working as an advisor in the Ministry of Human and Minority Rights and Social Dialogue.

In March 2025, Beriša was one of the founding members of the People's Movement for the State (PZND), a political initiative launched by President of Serbia Aleksandar Vučić. Beriša voiced opposition to the student-led anti-corruption protests in Serbia that have been organised since 2024. In April 2025, Beriša attended the pro-government counter-protest in Belgrade.

=== Minister of Human and Minority Rights and Social Dialogue ===
The composition of Đuro Macut's cabinet was announced on 14 April 2025, with Beriša mentioned as a candidate for the minister of human and minority rights and social dialogue. His nomination was opposed by Shaip Kamberi, the only ethnic Albanian member of the National Assembly. Kamberi stated that the proposal to appoint Beriša represented "a heavy blow to every Albanian who has suffered, resisted, and sacrificed for their rights in Serbia". Beriša was elected minister on 16 April 2025.

Beriša condemned the blockade of the Radio Television of Serbia and stated that his ministry will invite the deans of the faculties for a discussion within the framework of the social dialogue.

== Personal life ==
Beriša is married and has two children. He is a licensed court interpreter for the Albanian language. In 2019, Beriša was convicted for obstructing a police officer during a traffic stop in Novi Sad and received a six-month suspended sentence.

== See also ==
- Hatidža Beriša
