= Béla Bálint =

Serbian haematologist and academic

- Бела Балинт
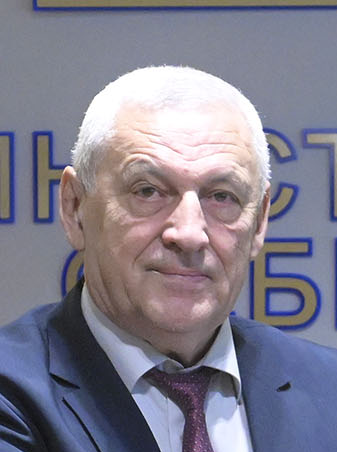
- Bálint in 2025

Minister of Science, Technological Development, and Innovation
- Incumbent
- Assumed office 16 April 2025
- Prime Minister: Đuro Macut
- Preceded by: Jelena Begović

Personal details
- Born: 26 July 1952 (age 74) Ostojićevo, PR Serbia, FPR Yugoslavia
- Party: Independent
- Other political affiliations: People's Movement for the State
- Education: University of Novi Sad
- Occupation: Academic
- Profession: Haematologist
- Awards: Sretenje Order

Béla Bálint (born 26 July 1952) is a Serbian haematologist, academic who has served as Minister of Science, Technological Development, and Innovation since 16 April 2025. He is also a member of the founding committee of the People's Movement for the State.

== Early life and education ==
Bálint was born in Ostojićevo on 26 July 1952 to Hungarian parents. He obtained his master's degree from the Faculty of Medicine at the University of Novi Sad in 1984, his doctorate from the Military Medical Academy in 1997, specialized in transfusiology in 1983, and completed a subspecialization in haematology in 2007.

== Career ==
Bálint has worked at the transfusiology Institute of the Military Medical Academy (MMA) since 1980, as an experimental haematologist at the Institute for Medical Research of the University of Belgrade since 1996, as a full professor at the MMA since 2005, as a visiting professor at the medical faculties in Niš and Banja Luka, as a professor at the European School of Transfusion Medicine in Milan, and as the head of the transfusiology Institute of the MMA since 2010.

He has been a full member of the Academy of Medical Sciences of the Serbian Medical Society since 2008, a member of the Association of Transfusion Specialists of Serbia, the International Society of Blood Transfusion, the European Society for Blood and Marrow Transplantation, the European Haematology Association, the Section for Transfusiology and Transplantation of the Serbian Medical Society. He is the president of the Association for Apheresis Treatment of Serbia and a full member of the Serbian Academy of Sciences and Arts since 4 November 2021, and a full member of the SASA Branch in Novi Sad since 2023. He was elected as a member of the Hungarian Academy of Sciences on May 7, 2025.

== Social/Political career ==
In March 2017, he signed a proclamation of support for presidential candidate Aleksandar Vučić. In February 2018, ahead of the Belgrade elections, he supported the list “Aleksandar Vučić – Because We Love Belgrade.” In April 2018, he was elected President of the National Council for Higher Education. In December 2023, ahead of the parliamentary and Belgrade elections, he signed a declaration of support for the list “Aleksandar Vučić – Serbia Must Not Stop.”

On 16 April 2025 he was elected as Minister of Science, Technological Development, and Innovation in Macut's cabinet.

== Awards ==
In 2024, he was awarded the Sretenje Order, by president Vučić.

Political offices
Preceded by Jelena Begović	Minister of Science, Technological Development, and Innovation; 2025–present	Incumbent
