= Movement for the People and the State =

Political movement in Serbia

Movement for the People and the State Покрет за народ и државу Pokret za narod i državu
- Abbreviation: PZND
- Legal representative: Tijana Nikolić
- Founder: Aleksandar Vučić; Đuro Macut
- Registered: 28 March 2025 (as an association)
- Headquarters: Šejkina 12, Zvezdara, Belgrade
- Ideology: Populism
- Colours: Blue
- Slogan: Srbija sanja i snove ostvaruje ('Serbia dreams and its dreams come true'); Ne damo Srbiju ('We won't give Serbia up')

The Movement for the People and the State (Serbian: Покрет за народ и државу, romanized: Pokret za narod i državu, abbr. PZND), initially referred to as the People's Movement for the State (Serbian: Народни покрет за државу, romanized: Narodni pokret za državu, abbr. NPZD), is a political movement in Serbia, registered as an association. It was initiated in March 2023 by Aleksandar Vučić, then President of Serbia and president of the Serbian Progressive Party (SNS), who described it as a "supra-party movement" that would bring together political parties, such as the SNS and the Socialist Party of Serbia (SPS), with other movements, associations and individuals. He organised rallies to promote it in 2023 and 2025.

The movement never published a programme; journalists and political scientists suggested it could take populist and centrist positions. Alongside the SNS, the Social Democratic Party of Serbia, Movement of Socialists, United Serbia, PUPS – Solidarity and Justice, Serbian Party Oathkeepers and Greens of Serbia expressed interest in joining it, while the SPS was divided, with its president Ivica Dačić in favour. All of these parties, including the SPS, contested the 2024 Belgrade City Assembly election on the Belgrade Tomorrow list, which won 64 of the 110 seats in the City Assembly of Belgrade. The movement was registered as an association in March 2025 and opened its first office in Niš in September 2025. Its founders include Đuro Macut, who became prime minister of Serbia in April 2025.

The movement became largely inactive after 2025. It did not take part in the March 2026 local elections or in the 2026 parliamentary election, which the SNS contested as "Aleksandar Vučić – United Serbia".

== History ==
=== Background ===
The Serbian Progressive Party (SNS) was founded in 2008 as a split from the Serbian Radical Party. It was led by Tomislav Nikolić until the 2012 elections, when he resigned from the presidency of SNS after being elected president of Serbia. Aleksandar Vučić succeeded him as president of SNS, and in 2017, Vučić succeeded Nikolić as President of Serbia after being elected in the 2017 Serbian presidential election.

Following the 2022 Serbian general election, Vučić hinted at the potential creation of a political bloc or movement that would act as the rebranded SNS. The news magazines Nova and Vreme compared the announced project to the All-Russia People's Front, saying: "the only common goal of the blocs is to strengthen [Vučić's and Vladimir Putin's] personal ratings". (Note: zajedničko im je i to što je pravi cilj, zapravo, jačanje njihovog ličnog rejtinga) Media initially referred to the movement as the Movement for Serbia, the Serb Bloc and My Serbia. Since then, the People's Movement for the State (NPZD) and the Movement for the People and the State have been the working names of the movement.

=== Formation attempts (2023–2024) ===
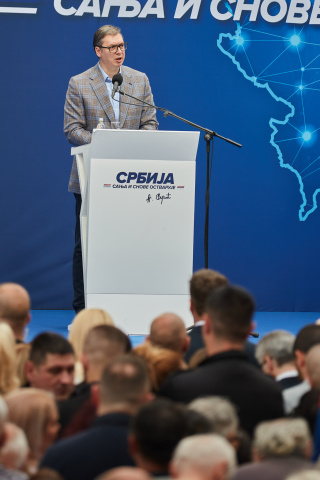
Aleksandar Vučić promoting the movement in May 2023

On 8 March 2023, Vučić announced the formation of the movement. He also said SNS would not be dissolved and that the movement would act as a "supra-party movement" (nadstranački pokret). Vučić organised rallies to promote the movement in Vranje on 11 March and in Pančevo on 19 May. Miloš Vučević, the Minister of Defence, succeeded Vučić as president of SNS on 27 May.

Initially, it was announced the movement would be formalised on Saint Vitus Day (Vidovdan; 28 June); however, shortly before that date, Vučić announced the movement would be formed by September 2023. In August, Vučević and Darko Glišić, the president of the executive board of SNS, announced the movement would be formalised later that year. The movement was not mentioned at the session of the SNS main board in October 2023. Shortly after the session, Vučić announced the movement would be formed "in the coming period" (u narednom periodu). Parliamentary and Belgrade City Assembly elections were held in Serbia in December 2023. In the parliamentary election, SNS regained its parliamentary majority, while the Belgrade City Assembly election resulted in a hung parliament. Election observers reported numerous irregularities on election day.

Vučić revived the discussion about the movement's formation in February 2024, saying the movement "should continue the economic growth of Serbia and defend [Serbia's] national and state interests". (Note: koji će imati snage da ubrza ekonomski rast Srbije i odbrani naše nacionalne i državne interese) He did not, however, announce when the official formation of the movement would take place. Analyst Dejan Bursać described the movement as a "marketing trick" (Note: marketinški trik) and an attempt to divert from the discussion of the European Parliament adopting a resolution on the irregularities that occurred in the 2023 elections. Đorđe Vukadinović of Nova srpska politička misao made a similar assessment.

For the 2024 Belgrade City Assembly election, the SNS formed a joint electoral list, Belgrade Tomorrow, with its existing partners, the SPS and the Serbian Party Oathkeepers (SSZ), on 7 April 2024. The electoral list also included the Social Democratic Party of Serbia (SDPS), Movement of Socialists (PS), United Serbia (JS), PUPS – Solidarity and Justice (PUPS), Healthy Serbia (ZS), Greens of Serbia (Zeleni), Serbian Radical Party, and Alliance of Vojvodina Hungarians. Vučević said that the list effectively realised the movement. Journalist Zoran Panović agreed, noting that this had happened without an official announcement. Vladimir Pejić, the executive director of opinion poll agency Faktor Plus, said the elections were a "dress rehearsal" (Note: generalna proba) for the movement. In the election, the Belgrade Tomorrow electoral list won 52 percent of the popular vote and 64 out of 110 seats in the City Assembly of Belgrade.

=== Registration and activity (2025) ===
In an interview in December 2024, Vučić announced the movement would be formed on 15 March 2025 and that he would not preside over it. A rally promoting the movement was held on 24 January 2025 in Jagodina. In March, Vučić said the movement would be formed by 28 June. The first initiatives regarding the formation of the movement began on 23 March. Among the founders of the movement were Đuro Macut, who later became prime minister of Serbia, and Béla Bálint, who went on to become minister of science. On 28 March, the Serbian Business Registers Agency (APR) registered two non-governmental, non-profit associations, the Movement for the People and the State and the Movement for the People, with the same seat and legal representative. The statute of the former lists its goals as "raising awareness about the significance of state and people's sovereignty", (Note: podizanje svesti o značaju države i narodne suverenosti) "commitment to prosperity, progress and modern state organization", (Note: zalaganje za prosperitet, napredak i modernu državnu organizaciju) and "promotion and affirmation of possibilities to contribute to the development of people's consciousness". (Note: promocija i afirmacija mogućnosti za doprinos razvoju narodne svesti)

In April and May 2025, the movement held rallies in Belgrade and Niš under the slogan "We Won't Give Serbia Up". A rally promoting the movement was intended to be held on 28 June but this never occurred. By May 2025, Bojan Klačar of CeSID said the movement could be observed "as a synonym of the governing party" (Note: sinonim za vladajuću stranku) and as a new political entity. In September 2025, the movement opened its first office in Niš; it later also had an office in Sombor. In the same month, in an interview with Insajder, minister Demo Beriša said that the movement would take part in the next parliamentary election.

=== Inactivity (2025–present) ===
No official membership figure was published; in June 2025, minister Boris Bratina said that, according to his information, membership had exceeded 100,000. At the SNS rally "Serbia, One Family" in front of the National Assembly on 27 June 2026, at which Vučić announced that he would resign as president, the Ministry of Internal Affairs named the movement as the organiser in its crowd estimate. Despite Beriša's statement, the movement did not take part in the local elections held in ten municipalities in March 2026 or in the 2026 parliamentary election, in which the SNS ran as "Aleksandar Vučić – United Serbia". The SSZ and the Party of Modern Serbia ran on the SNS list without having joined the movement. In October 2026, N1 reported that, after its pompous announcement, the movement had disappeared from public life within a few months; political scientist Ognjen Gogić said that its founders "did not even try to brand it". (Note: Oni nisu to ni testirali, čak nisu ni pokušali da brendiraju.) The association has not been formally dissolved.

== Ideology and platform ==
Vučić and Vučević described the movement as "state-building". (Note: državotvorni pokret) In June 2023, Vučić announced that the movement would publish its political platform "in 10 or 15 days", (Note: za deset ili 15 dana) but it had not done so by August 2023, and no platform was released before the movement became inactive. Nataša Anđelković, a BBC News journalist, said that the movement's orientation had not been clearly defined. Political scientist Vujo Ilić described the movement's formation as the "epitome of catch-all politics". (Note: otelotvorenje catch-all-a)

Journalists and political scientists speculated about the positions the movement could take. According to the newspaper Danas, the movement would likely promote "responsible national and civic positions" (Note: odgovorne nacionalne ali i građanske politike) and economically liberal policies. Nova reported the movement would be positioned in the political centre, that it would support the accession of Serbia to the European Union, and that it would oppose sanctions on Russia related to the Russian invasion of Ukraine. Political scientist Věra Stojarová said that the movement could adopt populist elements, judging by its proposed name.

Deutsche Welle reported that the movement would represent the "third way" (Note: treći put) in Serbian politics. Bojan Klačar, the executive director of CeSID, told Blic the movement would likely ideologically lean to the political centre-right. Balkan Insight described the movement as centrist. Euronews reported that extremist and pro-Russian figures could be excluded from the movement. Regarding this, Vučić said: "We will not let you destroy Serbia, neither you extremists on the left, nor you extremists on the right. We want to go straight into the future." (Note: Ne damo vam da uništite Srbiju, ni vama ekstremistima s leve, ni vama ekstremistima s desne strane. Hoćemo da idemo pravo u budućnost.)

== Organisation ==
At its rallies, the movement used the slogans "Serbia dreams and its dreams come true" (Srbija sanja i snove ostvaruje) and "We Won't Give Serbia Up" (Ne damo Srbiju). Nova reported the movement would not officially have a president but that Vučić would act as its representative; Danas reported Vučić would preside over a body that would include leaders of other political parties. After he was elected president of the SNS, Vučević said that Vučić would lead the movement. In December 2024, Vučić denied that he would preside over the movement and said that it would be headed by independent individuals. When the associations were registered in March 2025, Tijana Nikolić, who was not previously known to the public, was listed as their legal representative, with their seat at Šejkina 12 in Zvezdara, Belgrade. Klačar suggested that the registrations may have been made to secure the name before the movement's official name was decided.

=== Potential members ===
Political commentator Predrag Rajić said: "the most logical thing for the movement would be to include ruling parties" (Note: najlogičnije bilo da u tom bloku budu partije vladajuće većine); he named the SPS, SDPS, PS, and JS as potential members. Political scientist Zoran Stojiljković said the movement could also include minor parties like the Serbian Renewal Movement and supporters of Vučić who were not previously directly involved in politics. Danas reported PUPS and the Strength of Serbia Movement could be potential members of the movement. Klačar said the bloc could exclude far-right parties. Vučić said that the bloc "also needs Bosniaks, Hungarians, Roma, Slovaks, and Romanians in it" (Note: u njemu su nam potrebni i Bošnjaci, Mađari, Romi, Slovaci, Rumuni), and that it would also include independents. He also saw SPS as a potential member. Goran Vesić, the Minister of Construction, Transport, and Infrastructure, said non-governmental organisations could also take part in the movement. Aleksandar Šapić, the mayor of Belgrade, said that he would not join the movement.

At its conference on 10 March 2023, the SNS declared its support for the formation of the movement, and after Vučević was elected its president, he confirmed that the SNS would take part in it. Rasim Ljajić, then leader of the SDPS, said that "it is logical for his party to be part of the new movement" (Note: logično da ... stranka bude deo novog pokreta), while SPS, JS, PUPS, and the Democratic Alliance of Croats in Vojvodina expressed their support for the creation of the movement. In an August 2023 interview for Politika, Ljajić said: "[SDPS] certainly expects talks with our coalition partner, the Serbian Progressive Party" (Note: [SDPS] svakako očekuje razgovore s našim koalicionim partnerom Srpskom naprednom strankom) and that he sees the potential of the movement to be the "barrier to any extremism, especially right-wing extremism" (Note: ja ga vidim kao branu svakom ekstremizmu, naročito desničarskom). Milan Stamatović's ZS negotiated with SNS about joining the movement in October 2023. The SSZ initially declined to take part in the movement, but in February 2024, Milica Đurđević Stamenkovski, the party's president, confirmed that negotiations on the party joining the movement were being held. Klačar said that with Đurđević Stamenkovski and the SSZ, the movement could attract right-wing voters. Aleksandar Vulin, the former president of PS, said in February 2024 that the PS would join the movement if invited.

Ivica Dačić, the leader of the SPS, said that the movement could deepen cooperation between the SPS and the SNS. A faction of the SPS opposed joining, including vice-president Predrag J. Marković, who said that the party would lose its identity. Vladan Zagrađanin also said if SPS joined, it would "renounce everything that it had built up over the years". (Note: odrekla svega što je građeno godinama) Branko Ružić also opposed joining the movement. Đorđe Milićević and Snežana Paunović supported the SPS joining. During a visit to Germany, Milićević called on Serbs who live in Hamburg to support the movement. Paunović said that joining the movement would not "threaten the party's identity" (Note: ne bi ugrozio stranački identitet) and that they would "put ideological differences aside to achieve a common goal". (Note: staviti po strani ideološke razlike i objediniti se oko zajedničkog cilja) Dragan Marković, the president of JS and a coalition partner of SPS, also expressed support for joining the movement. The Zeleni, another partner of SPS, expressed their willingness to join the movement in February 2024.

Opposition parties such as the New Democratic Party of Serbia, Party of Freedom and Justice, Democratic Party, Dveri, and Movement of Free Citizens criticised the movement's formation or declined to take part in it. Enis Imamović, a Party of Democratic Action of Sandžak member of parliament, said: "the movement does not provide answers to other questions of vital importance for Bosniaks", (Note: niti daje odgovore na druga pitanja od vitalnog značaja za Bošnjake) while the Justice and Reconciliation Party said it would consider participating in the movement. We – Voice from the People refused to comment on the matter.
