= Jelena Begović =

Serbian molecular biologist

- Јелена Беговић
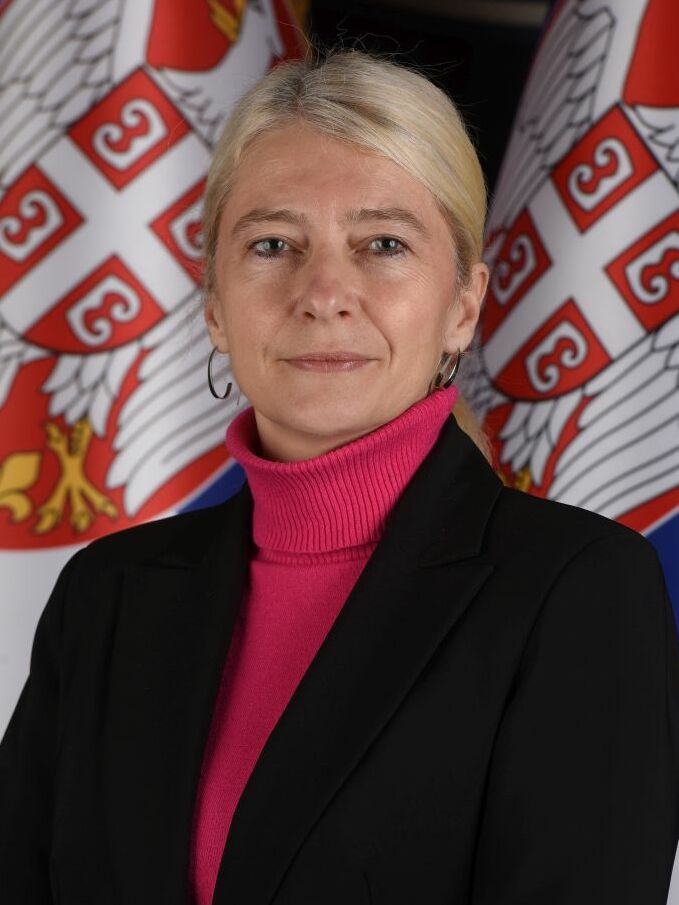
- Official portrait, 2022

Minister of Science, Technological Development and Innovation
- In office 26 October 2022 – 16 April 2025
- Prime Minister: Ana Brnabić; Ivica Dačić (acting); Miloš Vučević
- Preceded by: Office established (Note: The minister of education, science and technological development in the previous administration was Branko Ružić.)
- Succeeded by: Béla Bálint

Member of the National Assembly of the Republic of Serbia
- In office 1 August 2022 – 3 August 2022

Personal details
- Born: 5 June 1970 (age 56) Belgrade, SR Serbia, SFR Yugoslavia
- Party: Independent

Jelena Begović (Serbian Cyrillic: Јелена Беговић; born 5 June 1970) is a Serbian molecular biologist who has served as minister of science, technological development and innovation in the Serbian government from 2022 to 2025.

== Early life and academic career ==
Begović was born on 5 June 1970 in Belgrade, in what was then the Socialist Republic of Serbia in the Socialist Federal Republic of Yugoslavia. Her family relocated to Addis Ababa, Ethiopia, for a few years after her birth before returning to Belgrade, where she was raised. After studying for two years at the University of British Columbia in Canada, she graduated from the University of Belgrade Faculty of Biology (Department of Biochemistry and Molecular Biology), earning a bachelor's degree in 1998, a master's degree in 2002, and a Ph.D. in 2008. She has published widely in her field.

Begović became the chair of the University of Belgrade's Institute of Molecular Genetics and Genetic Engineering in 2014. During the early period of the COVID-19 pandemic in Serbia, she oversaw the opening of the "Fire Eye" lab, which tested numerous samples. In late 2021, she opened the Centre for Sequencing and Bioinformatics.

== Politician ==
In the 2022 Serbian parliamentary election, the governing Serbian Progressive Party (SNS) reserved the lead positions on its Together We Can Do Everything electoral list for non-party cultural figures and academics. Begović was given the third position on the list; this was tantamount to election, and she was indeed elected when the list won a plurality victory with 120 out of 250 mandates. She was featured prominently in the SNS's billboard campaign in Belgrade during the election. When the national assembly convened, she was appointed as a member of the committee on the rights of the child and a deputy member of the education committee (Note: Formally known as the Committee on Education, Science, Technological Development, and the Information Society.) and the environmental protection committee. Her term in the assembly was brief; she resigned her seat on 3 August 2022.

Ana Brnabić's third ministry was established on 26 October 2022, and Begović was appointed as the minister of science, technological development, and innovation.

In January 2023, Begović encouraged recipients of Serbia's Fund for Young Talents Studying Abroad to return to Serbia after their studies to contribute to the development of the country. In September of the same year, at the initiative of Begović and Serbian prime minister Ana Brnabić, the United Nations General Assembly approved a resolution on the International Decade of Sciences for Sustainable Development. This was the first time Serbia had initiated and coordinated the adoption of a thematic resolution at the United Nations since rejoining the institution in 2000.

Begović joined with Serbian president Aleksandar Vučić and Brnabić to launch Belgrade's BIO4 campus in December 2023. The campus is intended to become a centre of biotechnology in Europe.

She was re-appointed as science minister when a new administration under Miloš Vučević was introduced on 30 April 2024.
