= Ministry of Science, Technological Development, and Innovation (Serbia) =

Ministry in the Government of Serbia

- Министарство науке, технолошког развоја и иновација Ministarstvo nauke, tehnološkog razvoja i inovacija

Ministry overview
- Formed: 26 October 2022
- Jurisdiction: Government of Serbia
- Headquarters: Nemanjina Street 22–26, Belgrade
- Minister responsible: Béla Bálint
- Website: nitra.gov.rs

The Ministry of Science, Technological Development, and Innovation (Serbian: Министарство науке, технолошког развоја и иновација, romanized: Ministarstvo nauke, tehnološkog razvoja i inovacija) is a ministry in the Government of Serbia.

== History ==
It originally existed as the ministry of science from 1991 to 2004 and then under various different names from 2004 to 2011, when it was merged into the education ministry. The ministry was re-established as a separate entity with the formation of the third cabinet of Ana Brnabić on 26 October 2022. The current minister in Béla Bálint, a non-partisan figure nominated by the Serbian Progressive Party.

== List of ministers ==
Political Party: SPS DS DSS G17 Plus n-p

No.	Portrait	Minister	Took office	Left office	Time in office	Party	Cabinet
Minister of Science
1	Divna Trajković	Divna Trajković (born 1940)	23 December 1991	10 February 1993	1 year, 49 days	SPS	Božović
2	Slobodan Unković	Slobodan Unković (born 1938)	10 February 1993	28 May 1996	3 years, 108 days	SPS	Šainović; Marjanović I
3	Dušan Kanazir	Dušan Kanazir (1921–2009)	28 May 1996	24 March 1998	1 year, 300 days	SPS	Marjanović I
4	Branislav Ivković	Branislav Ivković (1952–2025)	24 March 1998	24 October 2000	2 years, 214 days	SPS	Marjanović II
5	Radivoje Mitrović	Radivoje Mitrović (born 1957)	24 October 2000	25 January 2001	93 days	SPS	Minić
6	Dragan Domazet	Dragan Domazet (born 1947)	25 January 2001	3 March 2004	3 years, 38 days	DS	Đinđić–Živković
Minister of Science and Environmental Protection
7	Aleksandar Popović	Aleksandar Popović (born 1971)	3 March 2004	15 May 2007	3 years, 73 days	DSS	Koštunica I
Minister of Science and Technology
8	Ana Pešikan	Ana Pešikan (born 1959)	15 May 2007	7 July 2008	1 year, 53 days	G17+	Koštunica II
Minister of Science and Technological Development
9	Božidar Đelić	Božidar Đelić (born 1965)	7 July 2008	14 March 2011	2 years, 250 days	DS	Cvetković
Minister of Science, Technological Development, and Innovation
10	Jelena Begović	Jelena Begović (born 1970)	26 October 2022	16 April 2025	2 years, 172 days	Independent (Note: Nominated by the SNS.)	Brnabić III; Vučević
11	Béla Bálint	Béla Bálint (born 1952)	16 April 2025	Incumbent	1 year, 115 days	Independent	Macut
