= Faton Xhemaili =

Albanian footballer (born 1998)

Personal information
- Date of birth: 15 November 1998 (age 27)
- Place of birth: Biljača, Serbia, FR Yugoslavia
- Height: 1.83 m (6 ft 0 in)
- Position: Left-back

Team information
- Current team: TSV Buchbach
- Number: 15

Youth career
- –2016: Tërnoci
- 2016–2017: TSV Schott Mainz
- 2017–2018: Radnik Surdulica

Senior career*
Years	Team	Apps	(Gls)
2018–2019	Radnik Surdulica	1	(0)
2018	→ Budućnost Popovac (loan)	11	(1)
2019	Kukësi	7	(0)
2019–2020	Skënderbeu	0	(0)
2020–2023	FC Pipinsried	70	(5)
2023–2024	Hessen Kassel	34	(1)
2024–2025	Türkgücü München	19	(1)
2025–2026	SV Wacker Burghausen	17	(0)
2026–	TSV Buchbach	9	(0)

International career^{‡}
2018	Albania U21	1	(0)
- * Club domestic league appearances and goals as of 24 September 2026 ‡ National team caps and goals as of 16 November 2018

Faton Xhemaili (Serbian Cyrillic: Фатон Џемаиљи, romanized: Faton Džemailji; born 15 November 1998) is an Albanian professional footballer who plays as a left-back for Regionalliga Bayern club TSV Buchbach.

== Club career ==
=== Early years ===
Born in Biljača, part of Bujanovac Municipality, located within Preševo Valley, a region in Serbia with Albanian majority. Xhemaili started playing in the youth team of Tërnoci from where he moved to Germany in summer 2016 to play in the youth side of TSV Schott Mainz in the season 2016–17.

=== Radnik Surdulica ===
In summer 2017 he returned to Serbian and joined the youth team of FK Radnik Surdulica. Being a newly promoted club to the Serbian SuperLiga, Radnik was looking for ways to challenge the vast majority of clubs in the league which were already established clubs at Serbian top-level. One way the club from Surdulica tried to diminish the gap was by recruiting talented Albanian players originally from the neighbouring Preševo Valley and Kosovo. Among them, the highlights go to Iljasa Zulfiu from Miratovac who was playing at local side Murina, and the other was Xhemaili, whose regular performances in the youth team of semi-professional German side TSV Schott Mainz gave a positive indication about his future potential and quality.

==== Budućnost Popovac (loan) ====
However, during the preparations for the second half of the season in winter 2017, it became clear both Xhemaili and Zulfiu would be in the group of youngsters needing more experience, and were selected to be placed at loan for the next period. For Xhemaili this meant being sent on loan to Budućnost Popovac in the Serbian third tier for the next 6-months. During this time, both Football Association of Albania and Albanian clubs turned their focus on footballers from abroad which were either Albanian or had Albanian background. Upon returning from the loan in summer 2018, Xhemaili stayed with the first-team playing with them the first half of the 2018–19 Serbian SuperLiga, however, he received very few opportunities, being 11 times on the bench but making only one league appearance, and one in the Serbian Cup.

=== Kukësi ===
During the winter break of the 2018–19 season, Radnik Surdulica accepted an offer from Kukësi of the Albanian Superliga, which proved to be beneficial for Xhemaili. During his time with Kukësi, he made seven appearances in the second half of the season as a left-back. He contributed to the team finishing in second place in the 2018–19 Albanian Superliga and winning the 2018–19 Albanian Cup, which was his first trophy.

=== Germany ===
In August 2020, Xhemaili signed with Bayernliga club FC Pipinsried. In his debut season with the club, he contributed to Pipinsried's success in winning the Bayernliga Süd and securing promotion to the Regionalliga Bayern.

== International career ==
In November 2018, Albania U-21 national team coach Alban Bushi, called the attention of the Albanian media to Xhemaili as a perspective left-winger playing in Serbian top-flight, and as a prospect of the Albania national team. He made his debut a day after his 20th birthday in a friendly game against Malta by entering as substitute in 76th minute of the game, which ended as a 2:0 Albanian win.

== Honors ==
Kukësi

- Albanian Cup: 2018–19

FC Pipinsried

- Bayernliga Süd: 2020–21
