= Predrag Rajić =

Serbian politician

Predrag Rajić (Serbian Cyrillic: Предраг Рајић; born 23 September 1987) is a politician and political commentator in Serbia. He has served in the National Assembly of Serbia since 2020 as a member of the Serbian Progressive Party.

== Early life and career ==
Rajić was born in Vrbas, Vojvodina, in what was then the Socialist Republic of Serbia in the Socialist Federal Republic of Yugoslavia. He was raised in Kula, graduated from high school in Vrbas, and received a bachelor's degree from the University of Novi Sad Faculty of Law. Rajić was head of public relations for FK Hajduk Kula from 2011 to 2013 and has written an official history of the team. He was subsequently employed at the secretariat of agriculture, water management, and forestry in the government of Vojvodina from 2014 to 2017, after which time he was hired by the Assembly of Vojvodina as an advisor for international co-operation. In December 2018, he was appointed as acting assistant secretary-general of the provincial assembly. He has also hosted lectures on international politics at the Cultural Center of Novi Sad since 2015.

Rajić has been a spokesperson for the Center for Social Stability in Novi Sad and, in this capacity, has often commented on political affairs in the Serbian media. In 2019, he reflected on the status and accomplishments of the Serbian Progressive Party on the eleventh anniversary of its founding.

He now lives in Novi Sad.

== Politician ==
Rajić received the 103rd position on the Progressive Party's Aleksandar Vučić — For Our Children electoral list in the 2020 Serbian parliamentary election and was elected when the list won a landslide victory with 188 out of 250 mandates. He is now a member of the assembly's foreign affairs committee and the European integration committee, a deputy member of the culture and information committee, a member of Serbia's delegation to the Parliamentary Assembly of the Organization for Security and Co-operation in Europe (OSCE PA); and a member of the parliamentary friendship groups with Algeria, Angola, Argentina, Armenia, Australia, Austria, Azerbaijan, Bahrain, Belarus, Belgium, Bosnia and Herzegovina, Brazil, Bulgaria, Canada, Chile, China, Cyprus, the Czech Republic, the Democratic Republic of the Congo, Denmark, Egypt, El Salvador, Estonia, Ethiopia, Finland, France, the Gambia, Georgia, Germany, Ghana, Greece, Guatemala, Guyana, the Holy See, Hungary, India, Indonesia, Ireland, Israel, Italy, Japan, Jordan, Kazakhstan, Kenya, Kuwait, Latvia, Lesotho, Liechtenstein, Luxembourg, Malta, Mexico, Moldova, Montenegro, Morocco, Myanmar, Namibia, the Netherlands, North Macedonia, Norway, Oman, Pakistan, the Philippines, Poland, Portugal, Qatar, Romania, Rwanda, Russia, Saudi Arabia, Sierra Leone, Slovakia, Slovenia, South Africa, South Korea, the Sovereign Order of Malta, Spain, the countries of Sub-Saharan Africa, Sweden, Switzerland, Tajikistan, Tunisia, Turkey, Turkmenistan, Uganda, Ukraine, the United Arab Emirates, the United Kingdom, the United States of America, Zambia, and Zimbabwe.
