= KF Tërnoci =

Football club in Serbia

FK Trnovac / KF Tërnoci
- Full name: Fudbalski klub Trnovac / Klub Futbollistik Tërnoci
- Nickname: Age (Aghas)
- Founded: 1976; 50 years ago
- Ground: Stadion u Trnovcu
- Capacity: 4,000
- Chairman: Jusuf Hasani
- League: Pčinja District League
- 2024–25: Pčinja District League, 2nd
Home colours	Away colours

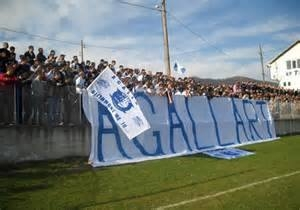
The supporters of the club Agallarët (Aghas)

Fudbalski klub Trnovac (Albanian: Klubi Futbollistik Tërnoci) is a football club from Veliki Trnovac, Bujanovac, Serbia which competes in the Pčinjska okružna liga which is the fifth tier in Serbian football. Together with Lugina and Besa 2005, they are the most known ethnic Albanian football clubs from the Preševo Valley.

== History ==
FK Trnovac was founded in 1976. In 2021, Trnovac won the Pčinjska okružna liga. Trnovac played then for two years in the Zone League South which is the fourth-highest football league in Serbia. In 2023, Trnovac withdrew from the league because questionable decisions from the referees in a game against FK Morava.

=== Recent league history ===
Season	Division	P	W	D	L	F	A	Pts	Pos
2020–21	5 - Pčinja District League	20	19	0	1	108	20	57	1st
2021–22	4 - Zone League South	26	10	6	10	52	53	36	9th
2022–23	4 - Zone League South	0	0	0	0	0	0	0	16th
2023–24	5 - Pčinja District League	26	21	3	2	109	28	66	2nd
2024–25	5 - Pčinja District League	26	20	2	4	91	25	62	2nd

== Players ==
=== International footballers ===
Below is a list of former and current international footballers who have played at least 1 match for a FIFA recognised country at senior or U21 level.

Player	Country	Caps	Goals	Active
Gjelbrim Taipi	Albania U21 and Kosovo	11	1	2010–present
Arbnor Fejzullahu	Albania	10	0	2011–2023
Faton Xhemaili	Albania U21	1	0	2018–present
