= Biljača, Bujanovac =

Biljača Биљача Bilaç
- Village
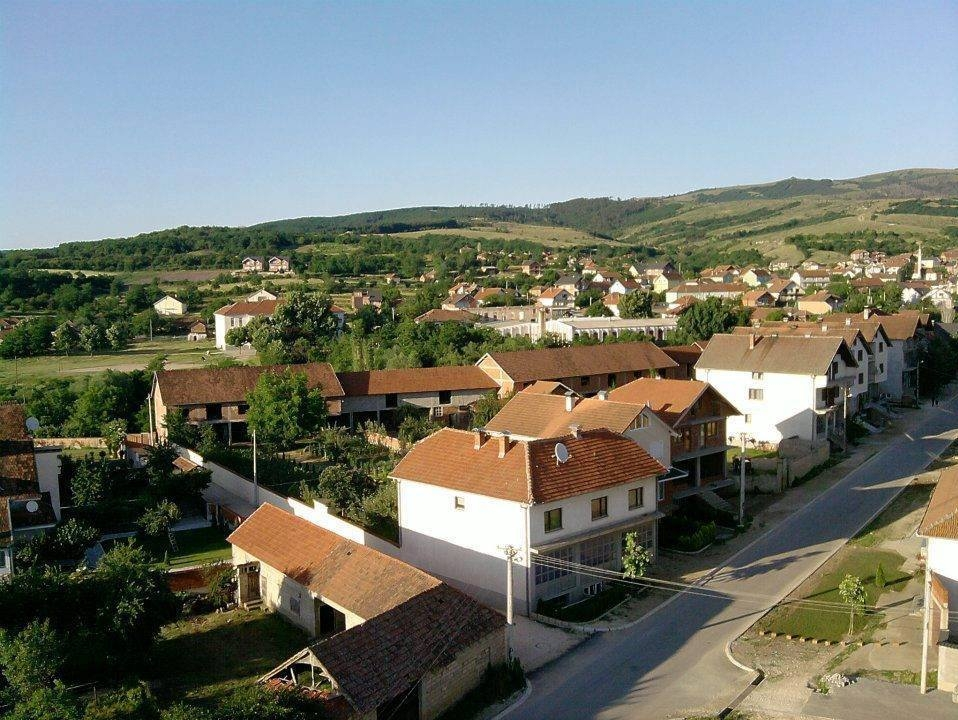

- Location within Serbia
- Coordinates: 42°21′13″N 21°44′35″E
- Country: Serbia
- Region: Southern and Eastern Serbia
- District: Pčinja
- Municipality: Bujanovac

Population (2002)
  - Total: 2,036
- Time zone: UTC+1 (CET)
  - Summer (DST): UTC+2 (CEST)

Biljača (Serbian Cyrillic: Биљача; Albanian: Bilaç) is a village in the municipality of Bujanovac, Serbia. According to the 2002 census, the settlement has a population of 2036 people. Of these, 1704 (83,69 %) were ethnic Albanians, 163 (8,00 %) were Serbs, 8 (0,39 %) Turkish, 2 (0,09 %) Hungarians, 2 (0,09 %) Macedonians, and 16 (0,78 %) others.
