= Pakovraće =

- Village
- Location within Serbia
- Coordinates: 43°53′N 20°15′E
- Country: Serbia
- District: Moravica District
- Municipality: Čačak

Area
  - Total: 7.53 km^{2} (2.91 sq mi)
- Elevation: 379 m (1,243 ft)

Population (2011)
  - Total: 479
  - Density: 63.6/km^{2} (165/sq mi)
- Time zone: UTC+1 (CET)
  - Summer (DST): UTC+2 (CEST)

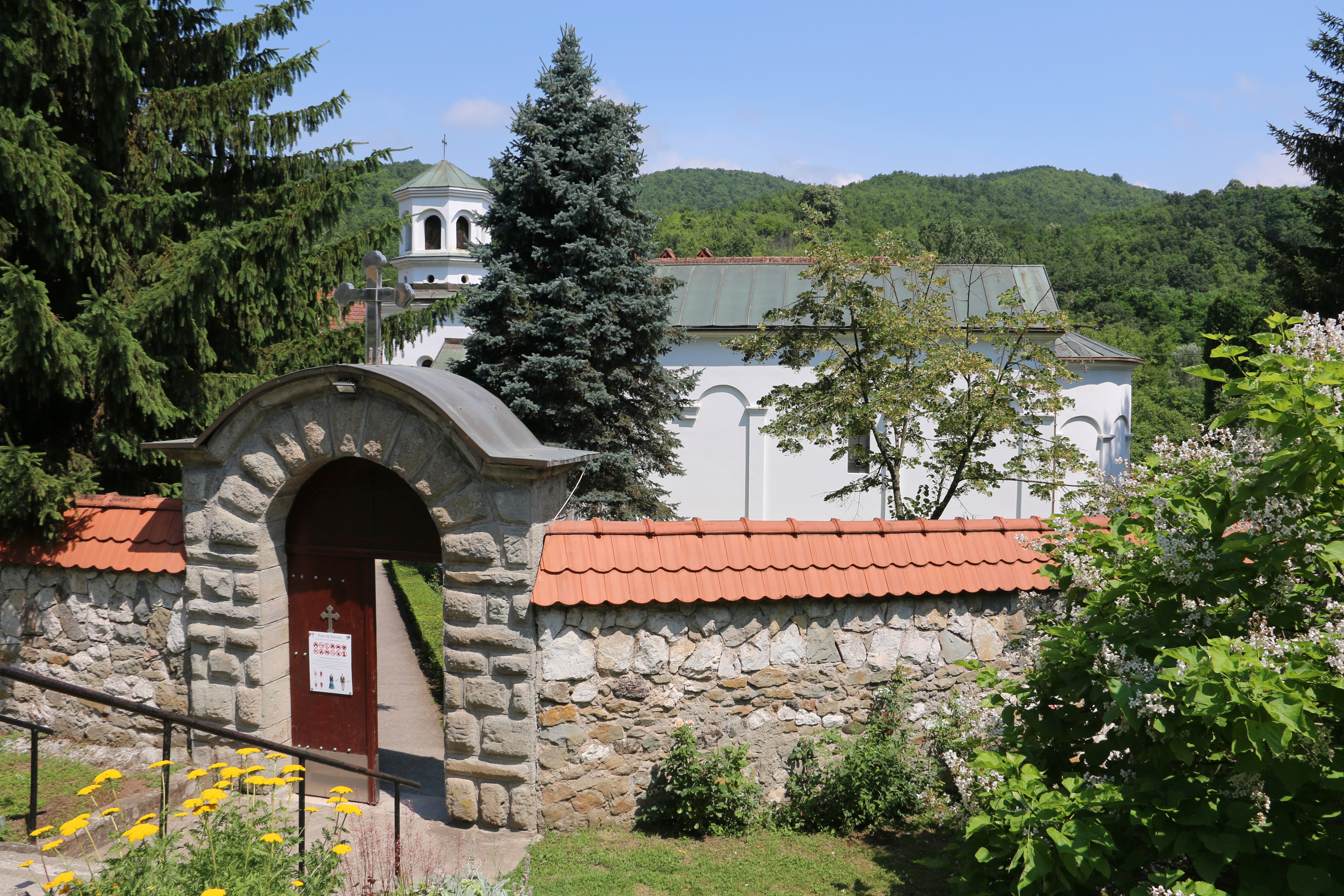
A monastery in the village

Pakovraće is a village in the municipality of Čačak, Serbia. According to the 2011 census, the village has a population of 479 people.
