= Hatidža Beriša =

Serbian university professor and military officer

- Хатиџа Бериша
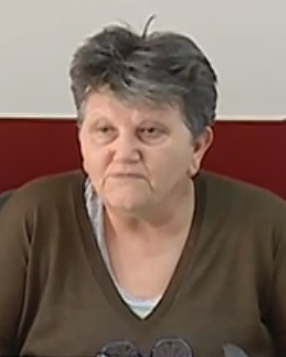
- Beriša in 2020

Personal details
- Born: 1961 (age 64–65) Klina, AR Kosovo and Metohija, PR Serbia, FPR Yugoslavia
- Education: University of Belgrade

Military service
- Allegiance: Yugoslavia; Serbia and Montenegro
- Branch: Yugoslav People's Army; Yugoslav Army
- Service years: 1980s–1999
- Rank: Officer
- Battles/wars: Insurgency in Kosovo; Kosovo War

Hatidža Beriša (Serbian Cyrillic: Хатиџа Бериша, Albanian: Hatixhe Berisha; born 1961) is a Serbian university professor and military officer.

== Biography ==
She was born in 1961 to a pro-Serbian Kosovo Albanian family in Klina, AR Kosovo and Metohija, PR Serbia, FPR Yugoslavia. Her father Halil fought as a soldier of the Royal Yugoslav Army and was captured by the German Army and held in German prison camps.

She received her doctorate from the Faculty of Political Sciences at the University of Belgrade with the thesis Political Violence in Kosovo and Metohija from 1945 to 2003.

Her brother Izet, a member of the special police unit, was killed in combat against Croatian forces in the Battle of Vukovar, on the last day of the battle. During that time, Beriša was a military officer stationed in Đakovica. Her partner, a military pilot, died in combat in 1993.

Following the Kosovo War, the Beriša family house was burned down by members of the Kosovo Liberation Army (KLA), since the Beriša family did not cooperate with them. In 1999, Beriša left Kosovo and Metohija as a refugee and no longer returned to the province. Her other brother Adem, a member of the State Security Service, was killed on 7 April 1999 in a NATO airstrike on a post office in Priština.

She is a professor at the Military Academy in Belgrade and at the Faculty of Engineering Management.

Beriša is a prominent Serbian patriot and believes that Kosovo is exclusively the territory of Serbia.

== Works ==
=== Books ===
- Posledice političkog nasilja na Kosovu i Metohiji, 2013
- Koncept Velike Albanije kao pretnja nacionalnoj bezbednosti Republike Srbije, 2014

=== Selected scientific papers ===
- Hatidža Beriša, Jovanka Šaranović, Rade Slavković, Bezbednosne implikacije globalizacije, IX međunarodni naučni skup Dani bezbjednosti na temu „Savremeni bezbjednosni rizici i prijetnje i njihov uticaj na bezbjednost džava regiona“, Banja Luka, 2016
- PREEMPECTIVE AND PREVENTIVE USE OF MILITARY FORCE IN INTERNATIONAL RELATIONS, 2018
- Serbia between NATO and CSTO, 2019
- Development of National Logistics in Support of the Serbian Air Force: Long-term Prospects, 2020

== See also ==
- Demo Beriša
