= Đuro Macut =

Prime Minister of Serbia since 2025

- Ђуро Мацут
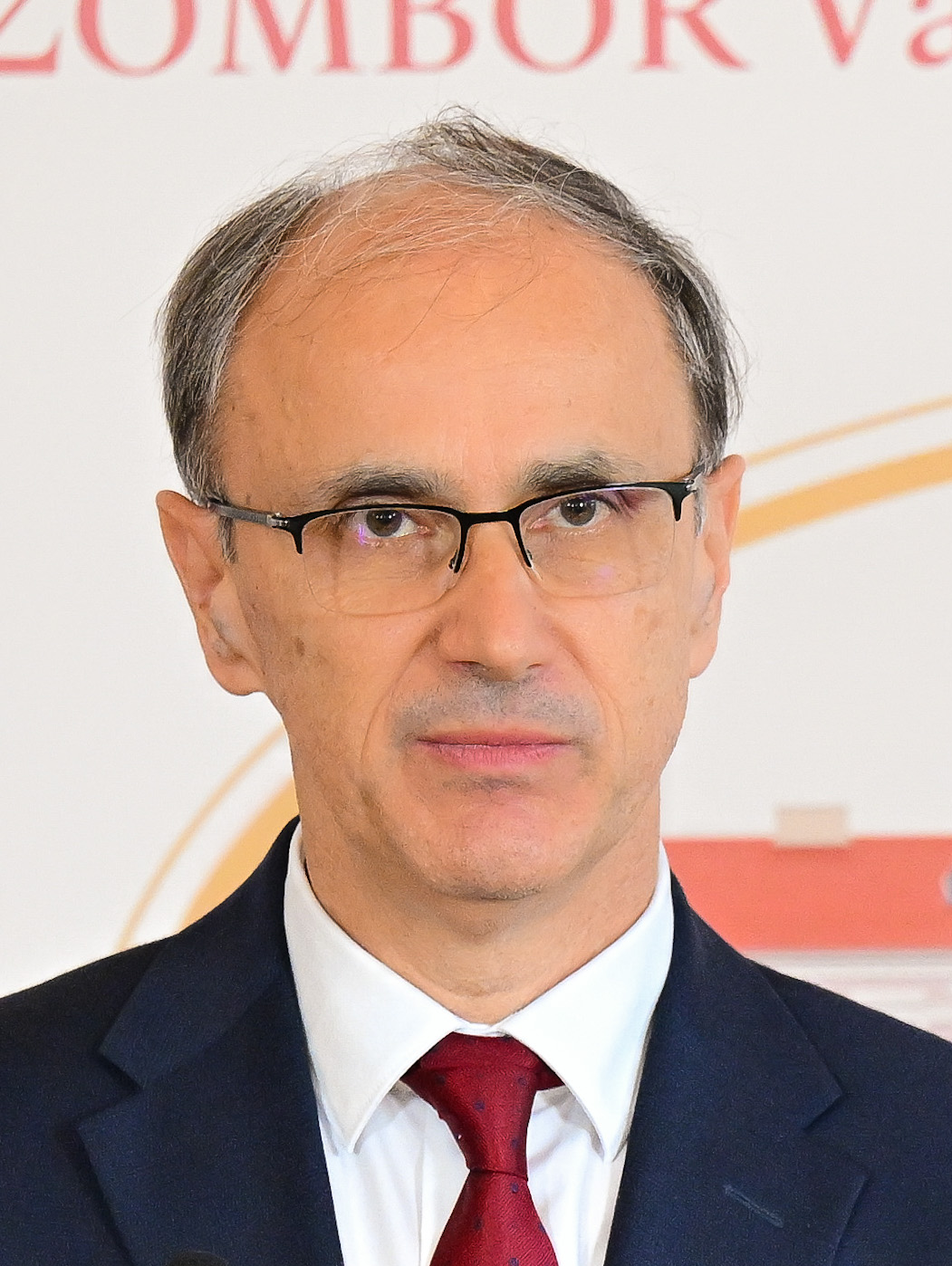
- Macut in 2025

Prime Minister of Serbia
- Incumbent
- Assumed office 16 April 2025
- President: Aleksandar Vučić; Ana Brnabić (acting); Aleksandar Čupić (acting)
- Deputy: Siniša Mali; Ivica Dačić; Adrijana Mesarović
- Preceded by: Miloš Vučević

Personal details
- Born: 22 November 1963 (age 62) Belgrade, SFR Yugoslavia
- Party: Independent
- Other political affiliations: Movement for the People and the State
- Education: University of Belgrade
- Occupation: Physician
- Profession: Endocrinologist

Đuro Macut (Serbian Cyrillic: Ђуро Мацут; born 22 November 1963) is a Serbian endocrinologist, academic, and politician serving as the prime minister of Serbia since 2025. Although not a member of any political party, Macut co-founded the Movement for the People and the State in March 2025, which was initiated by Aleksandar Vučić, the president of Serbia. He is the third independent politician to be nominated to the position of prime minister.

Born in Belgrade, Macut graduated from the Faculty of Medicine of the University of Belgrade in 1989, later obtaining a doctorate from the institution. Initially, he worked as an endocrinologist and researcher and later became a professor of internal medicine and endocrinology at the Faculty of Medicine in 2013. Politically inexperienced, Macut was nominated by Vučić as a candidate for prime minister in April 2025 and was voted in by the National Assembly of Serbia the same month.

As prime minister, he initiated meetings with the University of Belgrade rector Vladan Đokić on solving the education crisis started by the student-led anti-corruption protests, which ended up being successful. He hailed it as one of his major successful tasks as prime minister. His government also tackled the Law on Textbooks and the minimum wage was increased during his first 100 days. On foreign policy, he expressed support for continuing the accession of Serbia to the European Union, while also strengthening relations with various other countries.

== Early life and education ==
Đuro Macut was born on 22 November 1963 in Belgrade, SR Serbia, SFR Yugoslavia to Serbian parents from the region of Kordun, Croatia. His father, Pavle Macut, a former Yugoslav Partisan decorated for his service during World War II, served as a colonel in the Yugoslav People's Army. Macut attended the Saint Sava Gymnasium (then called the Third Belgrade Gymnasium) in Belgrade, and described his school days as significant for his future professional career. He graduated from the Faculty of Medicine of the University of Belgrade in 1989, later obtaining a master's degree in 1995 and a doctorate in 1999.

== Career ==
After graduating, Macut became an endocrinologist and researcher, working in areas related to metabolism, neuroendocrine tumours, and polyendocrine metabolic ovarian syndrome (PMOS). He later became a professor of internal medicine and endocrinology at the Faculty of Medicine in 2013 and the director of the Clinic for Endocrinology, Diabetes, and Metabolic Diseases at the University Clinical Centre of Serbia. He is also a visiting professor at the University of Athens and the Faculty of Medicine of the University of Skopje. After assuming the office of prime minister of Serbia, Macut stopped working at the Clinical Centre. However, the Administrative Board of the National Assembly of Serbia allowed him to continue his job at the Clinical Centre in October 2025. In 2019, a criminal charge was filed against Macut due to the death of one of his patients. The charge was dismissed in 2020 but was soon re-sent to the Constitutional Court. As of 2025, the Court has not resolved the case.

In 2012, he founded the Serbian Society for Reproductive Endocrinology. Macut has been an active member of the European Society of Endocrinology (ESE) since 2016, serving in various committees. He has chaired multiple committees within the ESE and contributed to the ESE Special Interest Group for PMOS. From 2016 to 2020, he served as the representative of the ESE Council of Affiliated Societies at the ESE Executive Committee in an ex officio capacity. In 2020, he was elected as a full member of the ESE Executive Committee and ESE Treasurer.

Macut voiced his support for the Serbian Progressive Party (SNS) in the 2023 Serbian parliamentary election. Despite this, he is not a member of any political party. He was featured as a speaker at a Movement for the People and the State (PZND) rally in Jagodina in January 2025. Later in March, he became one of the founders of the movement. Macut voiced opposition to the student-led anti-corruption protests in Serbia that have been organised since 2024, stating that politics should not become involved with the work of the University.

== Prime Minister of Serbia ==
Following the resignation of Miloš Vučević as prime minister of Serbia, negotiations were held for the formation of the new government of Serbia. Aleksandar Vučić, the president of Serbia, nominated Macut as the mandate holder for the prime minister of Serbia to the National Assembly of Serbia on 6 April 2025. He is the third independent politician to be nominated for the position, after Mirko Cvetković and Ana Brnabić. The composition of his cabinet was announced on 14 April; Siniša Mali, Ivica Dačić, and Adrijana Mesarović were presented as his deputies. His government is also composed of several independents affiliated with NPZD. Brnabić, the president of the National Assembly of Serbia, called a session for 15 April, to elect the new government. During the session, Macut presented his manifesto. Macut's cabinet was elected on 16 April, with 153 votes in favour.

The political scientist Dušan Spasojević and the analyst Cvijetin Milivojević argued that Macut would lack autonomy as prime minister on decision-making. Dejan Bursać, an associate at the Institute for Philosophy and Social Theory of the University of Belgrade, also argued that despite the inclusion of several academics in Macut's cabinet, the government would still be headed by SNS due to them retaining positions on key ministries. Reuters reported that despite his ceremonial role, Vučić would have a significant influence in the government. However, in July 2025, the political analyst Dragomir Anđelković said "that [Macut] is not ready to be Vučić's cannon fodder" (nije spreman da bude Vučićevo topovsko meso).

=== Tenure ===
==== 2025 ====
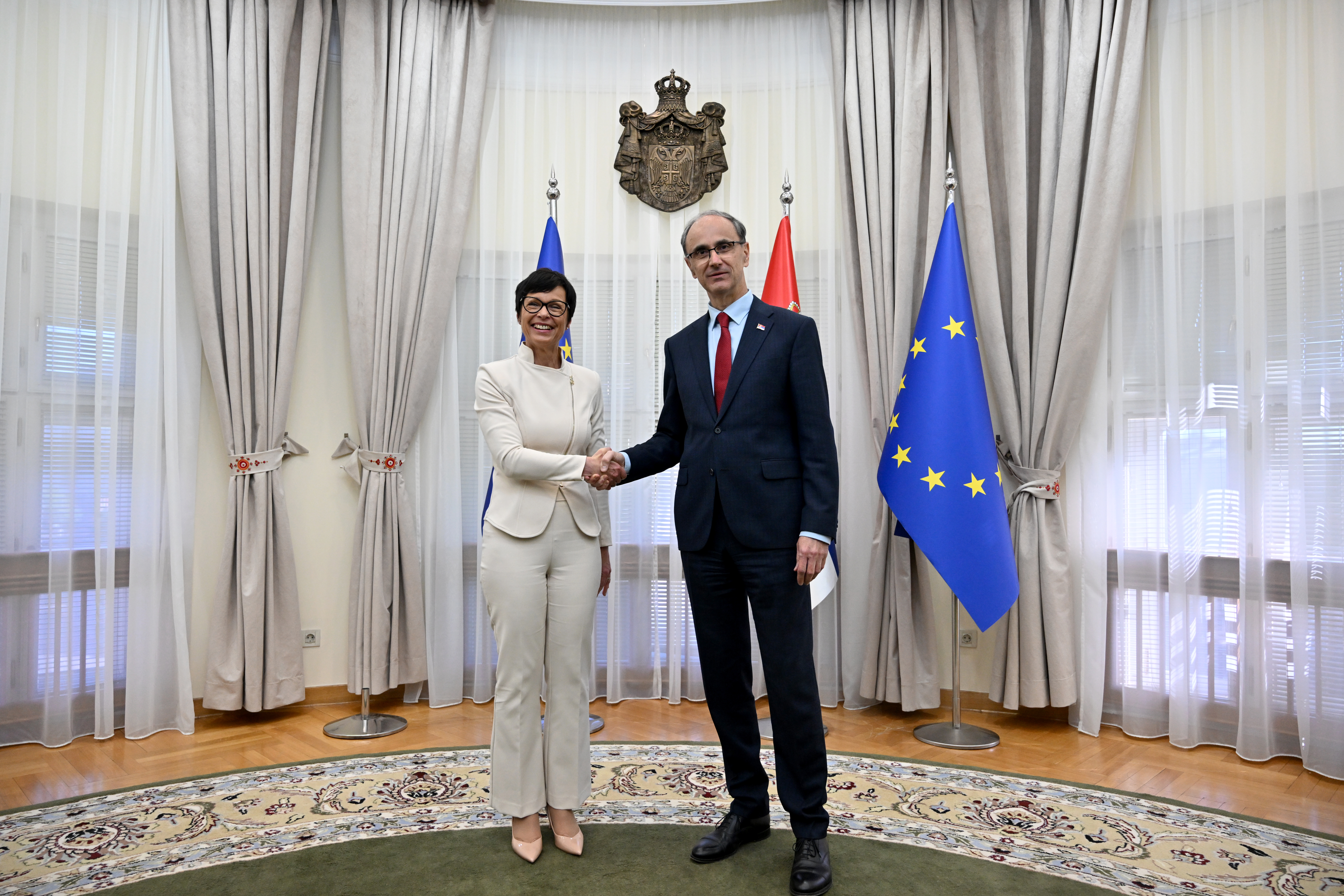
Macut with Marta Kos in April 2025

Macut made his first foreign trip on 26 April, visiting the Vatican City, where he attended the funeral of Pope Francis. After his return to Serbia, he met with Marta Kos, the European Commissioner for Enlargement, on 29 April, with whom he discussed the accession of Serbia to the European Union. In early May, he met António Costa, the president of the European Council, while later that month, he met with Kaja Kallas, the High Representative of the Union for Foreign Affairs and Security Policy, with whom he discussed Serbia-European Union relations. In June, he met Milorad Dodik, the president of Republika Srpska, Porfirije, the patriarch of the Serbian Orthodox Church, and Mostafa Madbouly, the prime minister of Egypt, with whom he discussed trade relations. In August, Serbia and Austria signed an agreement establishing further economic cooperation. In October, he met Hristijan Mickoski, the prime minister of North Macedonia, and the President of the European Commission Ursula Von Der Leyen during her visit to Serbia. Macut maintained the position that Serbia is still interested in EU accession.

In order to resolve the education crisis that began during the student-led anti-corruption protests, Macut initiated meetings with Vladan Đokić, the rector of the University of Belgrade. Their first meeting was held on 22 April. After the meeting, the rectorate of the University of Belgrade affirmed their position that the crisis would only end with the fulfilment of student demands. Their meetings continued into June. Macut and Đokić reached an agreement regarding the financing and activities of the University of Belgrade on 10 June. However, Đokić said that three more demands were not met. Vučević has criticised the meetings between Macut and Đokić, due to Đokić allegedly provoking violence at a 28 June (Vidovdan) protest. The crisis was later resolved, with the new academic year beginning on 1 November 2025. At the end of 2025, Macut hailed his meetings with University representatives as one of his major tasks as prime minister.

The government of Serbia adopted a draft of proposed changes to the Law on Textbooks in July; Macut described it as a victory for "national responsibility and the sovereign right of Serbia to educate its children according to its own values" (nacionalne odgovornosti i suverenog prava Srbije da svoju decu obrazuje prema sopstvenim vrednostima). The Association of Textbook Publishers, an association of major publishers in Serbia, alleged that the proposed changes would create a monopoly on the textbook market. During an event where he celebrated his first 100 days as prime minister, Macut highlighted the Law on Textbooks as well as infrastructure investments for the Pakovraće–Požega highway as his accomplishments. Economists noted that while Macut highlighted new economic measures during his manifesto, he did not introduce any new reforms. Despite this, the minimum wage and wages did increase during his first 100 days. Macut has called Serbia "an economic tiger with elements of a bear" (ekonomski tigar sa elementima medveda). In September, Vučić expressed disappointment with the work of ministers in Macut's government.

Macut took part in the 2025 Western Balkans Summit in London, meeting with the UK prime minister Keir Starmer. In early November, he traveled to Shanghai, where he met with Li Qiang, the premier of China, and Chinese business representatives, while a month later his government formed the Council for Family and Demography. In late December, Macut held talks with representatives of dairies and retail chains.

==== 2026 ====
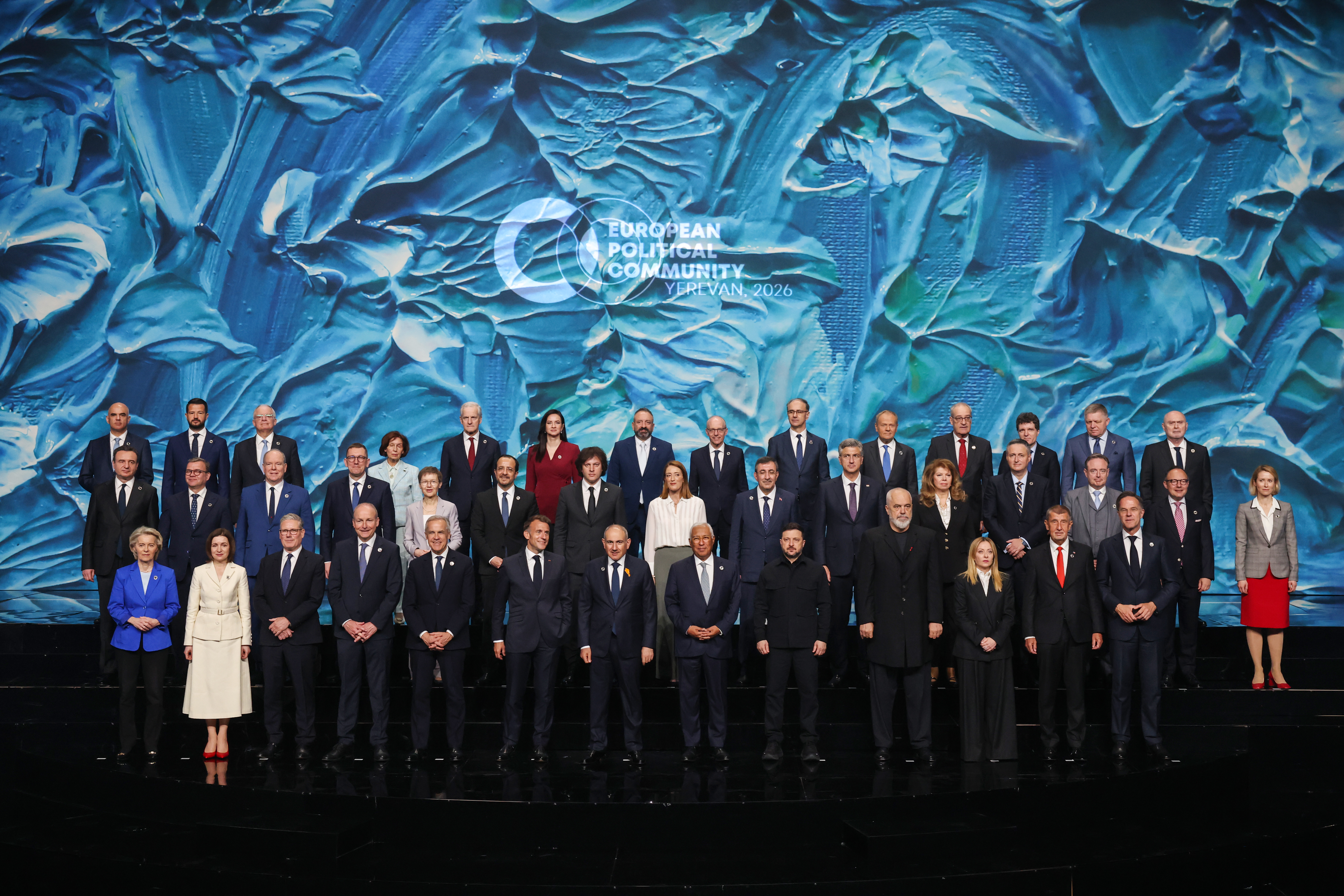
Macut and fellow European heads of states and governments in May 2026

In January 2026, Macut met with Savo Minić, the prime minister of Republika Srpska, with whom he signed an agreement on establishing a railway between Višegrad and Mokra Gora. Macut travelled to Dubai in early February where he met with Duma Boko, the president of Botswana, and Irakli Kobakhidze, the prime minister of Georgia. Soon after, while in Italy, he met with Sergio Mattarella, the president of Italy, Giorgia Meloni, the prime minister of Italy, JD Vance, the vice president of the United States, and António Guterres, the secretary-general of the United Nations. In March, Macut attended the Kopaonik Business Forum, and met with Alain Berset, the secretary general of the Council of Europe. Later that month, Macut travelled to Algeria. In May, Macut attended the 8th European Political Community Summit in Yerevan, Armenia.

In January, some municipalities in Serbia faced heavy snow, which left at least 6,000 households without electricity. In response, 11 municipalities proclaimed the situation as an emergency. Macut declined to proclaim a state of emergency, stating that local governments took everything under control. In late January, Macut held a meeting with his cabinet ministers, alongside president Vučić. Soon after, he suggested that the cabinet could be reconstructed during spring, while in February, he expressed disappointment with some ministers. In the same month, the government proclaimed pronatal policies, investment in road, train, and energy infrastructure, as well as environmentalism as key strategies from 2028 to 2030. Later in May, Macut suggested reconstructing the government by merging ministries and government agencies.

Shortly before the first anniversary of his government, Macut, in an interview with the Radio Television of Serbia, proclaimed the "stabilisation of political and social life" (stabilizacija političkog, ali i društvenog života) as the government's best accomplishment, while also expressing hope in reaching political consensus, referencing the talks that president Vučić held with various political parties about the next Serbian parliamentary election. In February, 62 members of the National Assembly filed an motion of confidence in Macut's government, which was subsequently added to the session's agenda. The National Assembly met on 15 April, however, there was no quorum for the session to proceed as there were only 47 MPs in the room. A day later, the National Assembly met, again with no quorum.

On 7 September, the same day Ratko Mladić was buried in a large ceremony in Belgrade, Macut proposed the dissolution of the parliament to the president. This comes as a response to president Vučić hinting at parliamentary elections in late October. In his address to the public Macut stated that "they not only secured the stability and the constitutional order, but started up the economy and strengthened the institutions", but later reflected on the numerous calls for the elections from the public saying: "A responsible government never ignores such requests".

==== Opinion polling ====
In May 2026, an Eurobarometer opinion poll was published in which 59% of respondents expressed disappointment with the work of the government. In the same poll, 49% of the respondents said that they had positive opinion about the government's response to the Russian invasion of Ukraine. A CRTA and Democracy Action Lab poll from June 2026 found that 41% of the respondents did not know who the prime minister of Serbia was.

== Political positions ==
=== Foreign policy ===
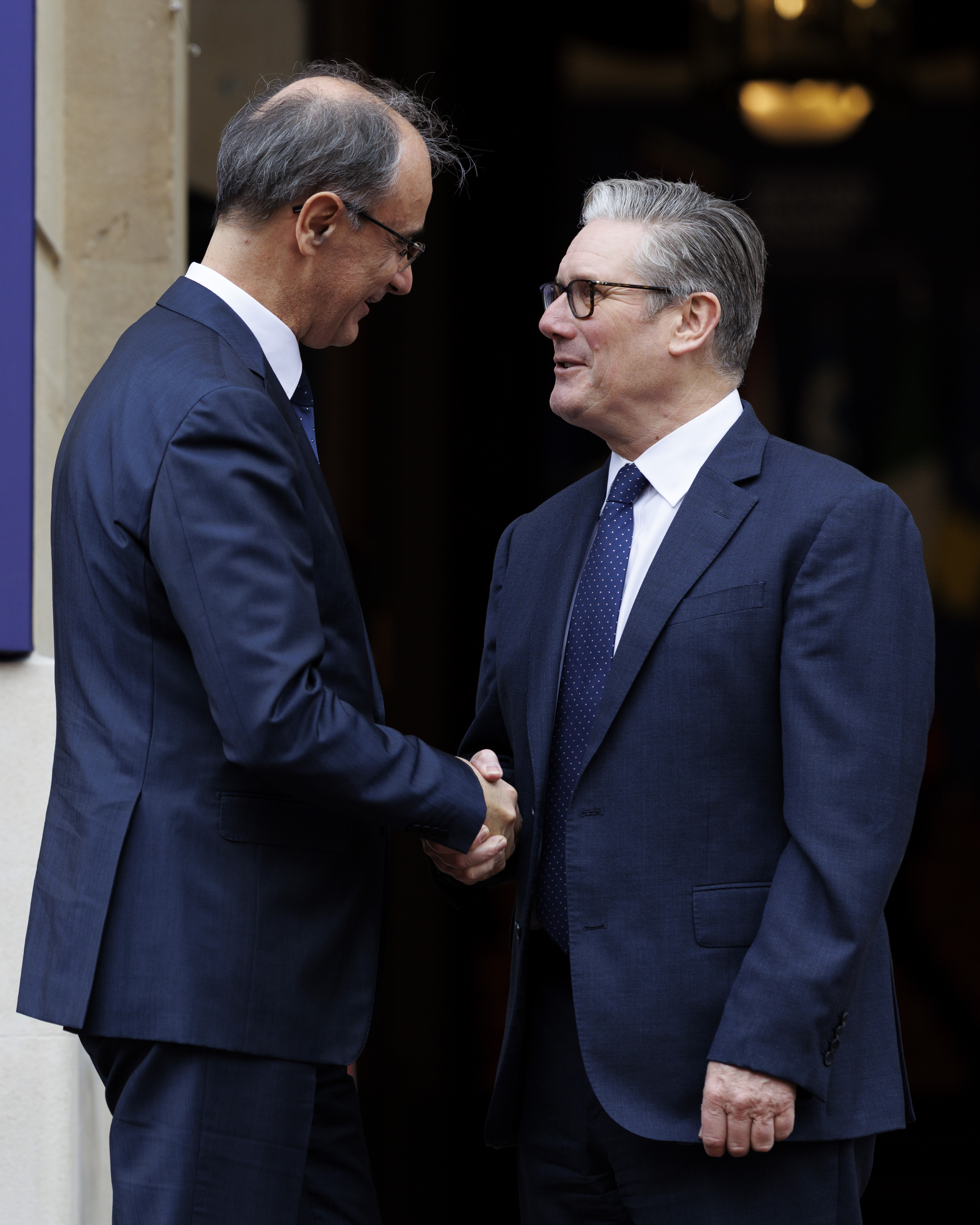
Macut and prime minister of the United Kingdom, Keir Starmer, in 2025. Macut supports strengthening relations with the United Kingdom.

During his tenure as the prime minister of Serbia, Macut expressed support for continuing the accession of Serbia to the European Union. In November 2025, he said that Serbia is close to obtaining EU membership; he also described his government as pro-European. He supports strengthening relations with China, Israel, Palestine, Iran, Denmark, Switzerland, and the United Kingdom.

=== Domestic issues ===
In an interview with the Russian state-owned news agency TASS, Macut said that "we cannot accept [the LGBT agenda] which is contrary to our traditional and Christian values" (ne možemo prihvatiti ono što je u suprotnosti sa našim tradicionalnim i hrišćanskim načelima). He also expressed interest in moving closer to BRICS and an opposition to sending weapons to Ukraine. Macut expressed support for cooperation with the International Monetary Fund.

He also supports anti-corruption measures, as well as Serbia's transition towards a green economy and investment in environmental projects. As prime minister, he has said that Serbia's goal is to have half of its energy come from renewable sources by 2030. He supports the organisation of the Expo 2027 project.

In late September 2025, Macut welcomed the return of general Nebojša Pavković to Serbia. His statement was criticised by the Youth Initiative for Human Rights non-governmental organisation because of Pavković's war crimes conviction.

== Personal life ==
Macut is married to Jelica Bjekić Macut and has one child.

According to the report of investigative journalist organisation KRIK, Macut bought a €1.2 million home from Tomislav Bogetić, the former director of the public company Beograd put, shortly before becoming prime minister. In addition to this property, he also owns five flats. He later reported to the Agency for Prevention of Corruption that he bought the €1.2 million property "by a combination of income from the sale of other real estate, personal savings, gifts, and loans" (kombinacijom prihoda od prodaje drugih nekretnina, lične ušteđevine, poklona i pozajmice). Macut also owns a car and a Walther gun. All of his properties combined are worth €2.5 million. In April 2026, he filed a complaint against KRIK. The Press Council of Serbia said that KRIK did not violate the Code of Journalists.

== Awards ==
- Order of Karađorđe's Star, 2024
- Honorary Doctorate at National and Kapodistrian University of Athens, 2025
- Order of Saint Stefan Štiljanović, 2026

Political offices
Preceded by Miloš Vučević	Prime Minister of Serbia; 2025–present	Incumbent
