= Arbnor Fejzullahu =

Albanian footballer (born 1993)

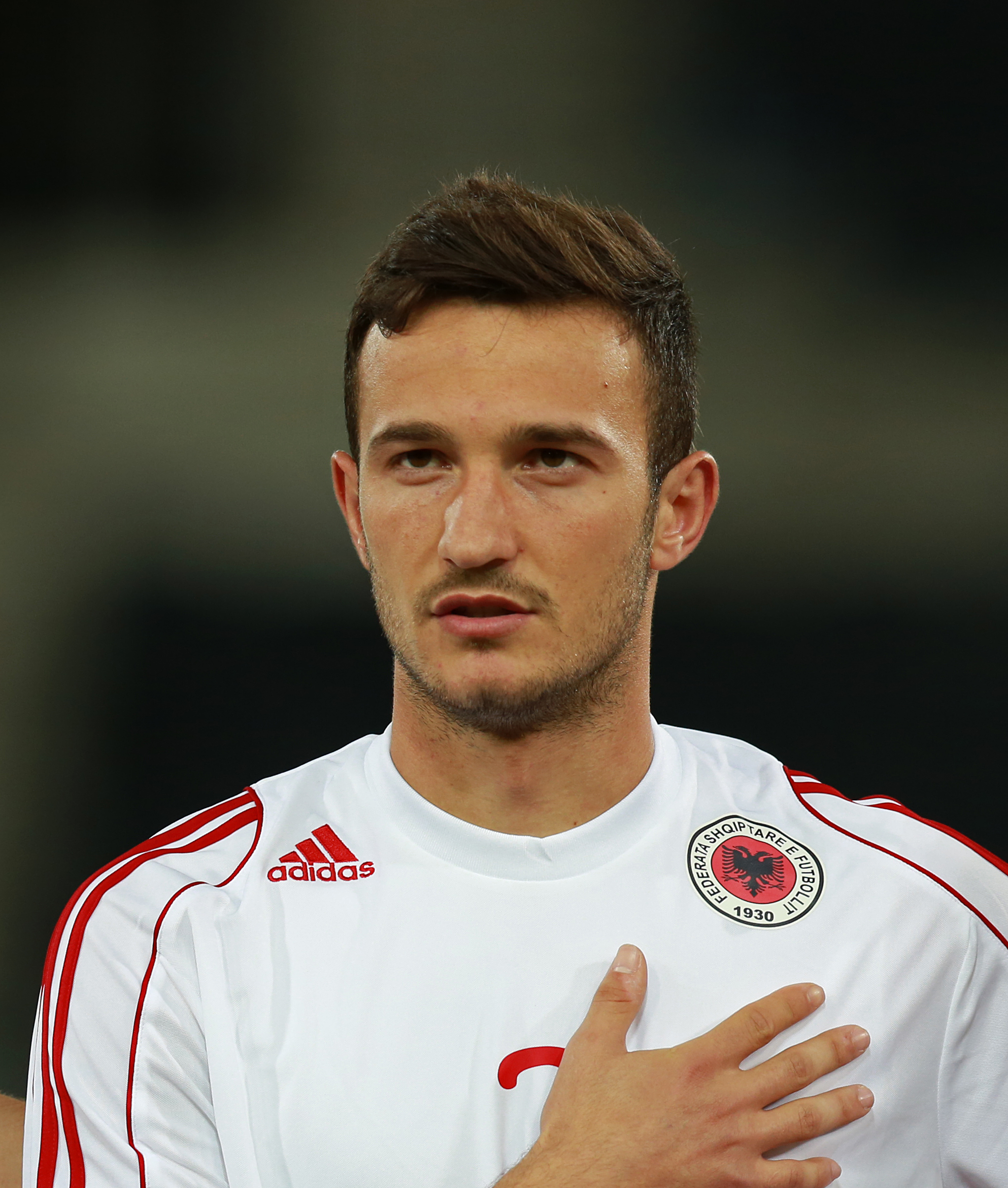
- Fejzullahu in 2014 with the Albania U21

Personal information
- Date of birth: 8 April 1993 (age 33)
- Place of birth: Vranje, FR Yugoslavia
- Height: 1.85 m (6 ft 1 in)
- Position: Right-back

Youth career
- 2005–2011: Tërnoci

Senior career*
Years	Team	Apps	(Gls)
2011–2014	Besa Kavajë	72	(1)
2014–2018	Partizani Tirana	93	(1)
2018–2019	Neuchâtel Xamax	6	(0)
2020–2023	Rapperswil-Jona	30	(3)
2023	→ Freienbach (loan)	11	(0)

International career^{‡}
2011–2012	Albania U19	3	(0)
2011–2014	Albania U21	6	(0)
2015	Albania	1	(0)
- * Club domestic league appearances and goals as of 28 July 2024 ‡ National team caps and goals as of 13 June 2015

Arbnor Fejzullahu (born 8 April 1993) is a professional footballer who most recently played as a right-back for Swiss club FC Freienbach. Born in Yugoslavia, he represented Albania internationally.

== Club career ==
=== Early career ===
Fejzullahu was born in the town Vranje in southern Serbia, FR Yugoslavia to Albanian parents. He played for the local ethnic Albanian team Tërnoci from the town of Veliki Trnovac. He was an important first team member in the heart of the midfield at the age of just 17 in the Serbian 5th tier of the football level.

=== Besa Kavajë ===
Fejzullahu moved to Albania in the summer of 2011 to join Besa Kavajë who had just been relegated to the Albanian First Division. Following his arrival prompted positive feedback by both the manager of Besa, Gugash Magani and the club's directors who all believed Fejzullahu would play a big role in the club's ambitions to return to the Albanian Superliga.

=== Partizani Tirana ===
Following Besa's relegation to the Albanian First Division, Fejzullahu was given permission by the club to leave, and after interest from several Albanian sides he decided to join Partizani Tirana. He officially signed on 27 May alongside Idriz Batha and the new manager Shpëtim Duro. Fejzullahu debuted in team's opening match of 2014–15 season against Laçi, starting and playing full-90 minutes in a 1–1 away draw. Later, on 19 November 2014, he scored his first goal for the club against Lushnja, valid for the second round of Albanian Cup, scoring the equaliser in the 25th minute, in an eventual 4–1 home win.

Following the end of 2015–16, Fejzullahu handed a transfer request in order to move abroad. He was willing to pay the clausole which was €50,000. Aside moving abroad, he was strongly linked with a move to Skënderbeu Korçë, participating in a training session with them. Partizani did not allow the player to leave the club due his contract until June 2017, which led the played to send the case to the Room of Conflict Resolution, where the club was victorious. In the end, the player decided to stay at Partizani for the new season.

On 30 September 2016, Fejzullahu agreed a contract extension, signing a contract until June 2018.

== International career ==
Interest was shown in Fejzullahu by the Serbia U-18 side in January 2011, but he declined the request to represent Serbia, stating that he would like to play for Albania.

In August 2011 he was invited by the Albanian Football Association to participate in a training camp held in Kamëz, Albania following the recommendation by a member of the Albanian supporters' association Tifozat Kuq e Zi, Jetmir Salihu. The training camp was held for ethnic Albanian footballers playing abroad. He shone amongst the 30 participants which meant the Albanian Football Association quickly began the procedure to equip the player with Albanian citizsenhip.

=== Albania senior team ===
Fejzullahu received his first call up to the senior Albania national team by Gianni De Biasi on 8 June 2015 for a friendly game against France on 13 June and was used in the last minutes of the match, marking thus his debut.

== Career statistics ==
=== Club ===
As of 00:59, 21 July 2018 (UTC)

Appearances and goals by club, season and competition
Club	Season	League			Cup		Europe		Other		Total	
Club	Season	Division	Apps	Goals	Apps	Goals	Apps	Goals	Apps	Goals	Apps	Goals
Besa Kavajë	2011–12	Albanian First Division	25	1	3	1	—		1	0	29	2
Besa Kavajë	2012–13	Albanian Superliga	20	0	3	0	—		—		23	0
Besa Kavajë	2013–14	Albanian Superliga	27	0	0	0	—		—		27	0
Besa Kavajë	Total		72	1	6	1	0	0	1	0	79	2
Partizani Tirana	2014–15	Albanian Superliga	33	0	2	1	—		—		35	1
Partizani Tirana	2015–16	Albanian Superliga	33	1	2	0	2 (Note: All appearance(s) in UEFA Europa League)	0	—		37	1
Partizani Tirana	2016–17	Albanian Superliga	26	0	2	0	2	0	—		30	0
Partizani Tirana	2017–18	Albanian Superliga	5	0	1	0	2	0	—		8	0
Partizani Tirana	Total		97	1	7	1	6	0	0	0	110	2
Career total			169	2	13	2	6	0	1	0	189	4

=== International ===
As of 13 June 2016

Appearances and goals by national team and year
National team	Year	Apps	Goals
Albania	2015	1	0
Total		1	0
