= Gjelbrim Taipi =

Kosovan footballer (born 1992)

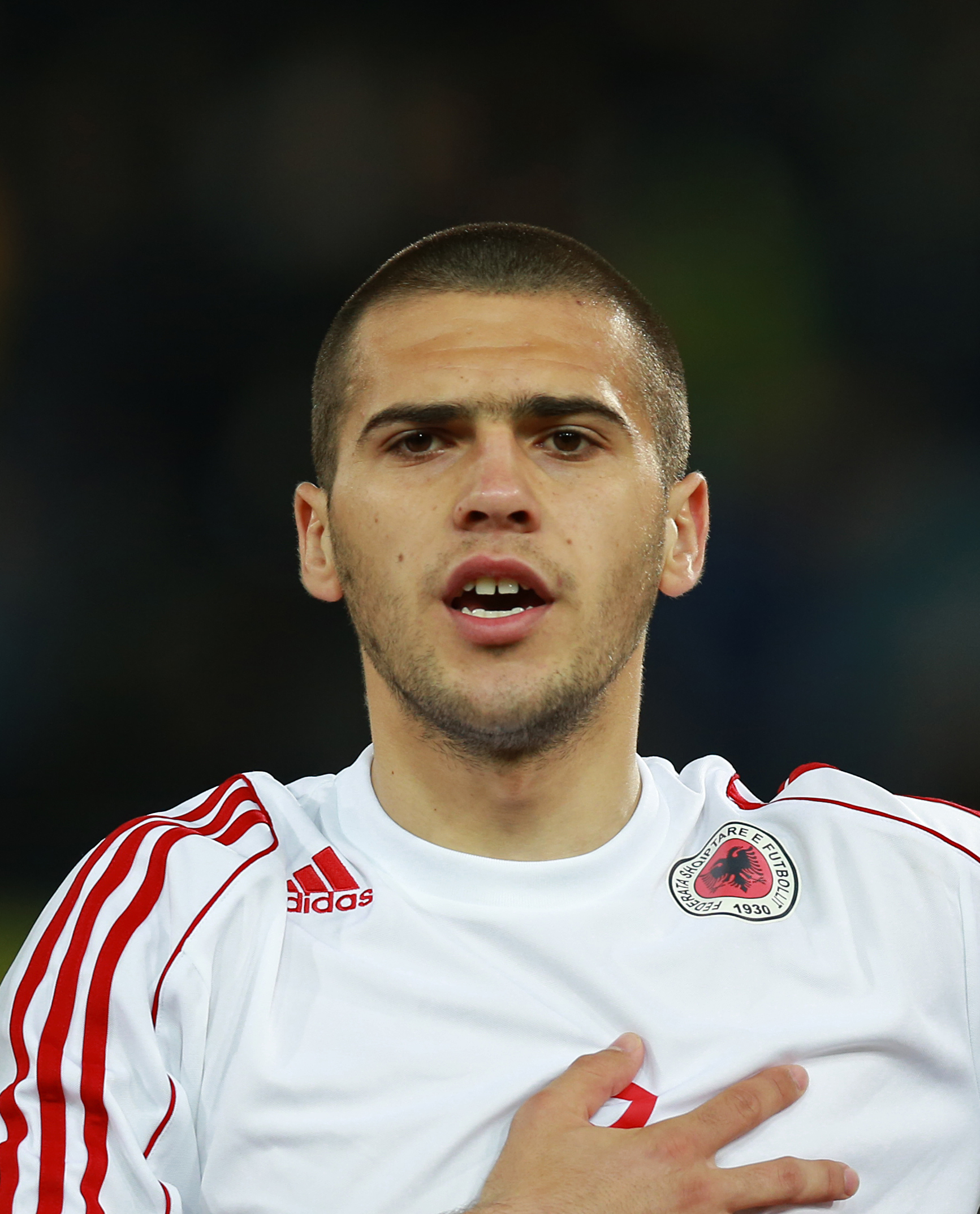
- Taipi with Albania U21 in 2014

Personal information
- Full name: Gjelbrim Izir Taipi
- Date of birth: 13 December 1992 (age 33)
- Place of birth: Bujanovac, Serbia, FR Yugoslavia
- Height: 1.75 m (5 ft 9 in)
- Position: Attacking midfielder

Team information
- Current team: KF Feronikeli 74
- Number: 27

Youth career
- –2010: Tërnoci

Senior career*
Years	Team	Apps	(Gls)
2010–2011	Tërnoci	31	(17)
2011–2013	Shkëndija	55	(6)
2013–2017	Wil	98	(16)
2017	Schaffhausen	16	(3)
2017–2018	St. Gallen	14	(0)
2018–2019	Grasshoppers	31	(0)
2019–2020	Winterthur	12	(0)
2020	Schaffhausen	14	(4)
2020–2023	Kukësi	107	(12)
2023–2025	Partizani	64	(2)
2025–2026	Prishtina	33	(2)
2026-	Feronikeli 74	3	(0)

International career
2012–2014	Albania U21	9	(1)
2018–	Kosovo	2	(0)
- * Club domestic league appearances and goals as of 22 June 2026

Gjelbrim Izir Taipi (born 13 December 1992) is a Kosovan professional footballer who plays as an attacking midfielder for Prishtina.

== Early life ==
Taipi was born in Bujanovac, FR Yugoslavia from Albanian parents from Veliki Trnovac and is the older brother of Skënderbeu Korçë player Shqiprim Taipi.

== Club career ==
=== Tërnoci ===
In his youth, Taipi joined his local football team Tërnoci. Moving up the ranks within the club, he eventually joined the senior team at the age of 17. In his first season at Tërnoci, he scored 17 goals in 31 appearances in the Pčinjska Liga and becoming the league's top scorer. He was regarded as a talented player and received transfer offers from Swiss club Young Boys, German club Rot-Weiß Oberhausen and Slovenian club Koper.

=== Shkëndija ===
Taipi made his first appearance for Shkëndija against Partizan in the home leg of the second qualifying round of 2011–12 UEFA Champions League. In his first season at Shkëndija, he made twenty six appearances, scored two goals and four assists. He had integrated himself well into the Shkëndija squad and helped Shkëndija to third place in the 2011–12 season.

During his second season, Taipi became a key member of the Shkëndija and he was involved in the first qualifying round of 2012–13 UEFA Europa League against Portadown. He became a favored player by the fans when and on 7 October, he scored a long-distance goal and assisted a second to Muzafer Ejupi against Shkëndija's rival, Vardar at home. The next week, he scored his second goal of the season against Drita. At the end of the season, it was expected Taipi would move abroad, with speculation indicating Switzerland.

=== Wil ===
On 9 June 2013. Taipi officially signed with Swiss Challenge League side Wil for two years. On 21 July 2013, he made his debut in a match against Chiasso after being named in the starting line-up and scored his side's the first goal during a 3–0 away win.

=== Schaffhausen ===
On 16 January 2017. Taipi joined Swiss Challenge League side Schaffhausen. On 5 February 2017, he made his debut in a 2–2 away draw against Aarau after being named in the starting line-up.

=== St. Gallen ===
On 1 July 2017. Taipi joined Swiss Super League side St. Gallen. On 9 September 2017, he made his debut in a 3–3 away draw against Lausanne-Sport after coming on as a substitute in the 63rd minute in place of Danijel Aleksić.

=== Grasshoppers ===
On 16 January 2018. Taipi signed Swiss Super League side Grasshoppers. On 4 February 2018, he made his debut in a 1–3 away win against Sion after being named in the starting line-up.

== International career ==
=== Albania ===
==== Under-21 ====
On 6 June 2012. Taipi made his debut with Albania U21 in a 2013 UEFA European Under-21 Championship qualification match against Portugal U21 after being named in the starting line-up.

=== Kosovo ===
On 19 March 2018. Taipi received a call-up from Kosovo for the friendly matches against Madagascar and Burkina Faso. On 27 March 2018, he made his debut with Kosovo in a friendly match against Burkina Faso after being named in the starting line-up

== Career statistics ==
=== Club ===
As of 9 May 2018

Appearances and goals by club, season and competition
Club	Season	League			Cup		Europe (Note: Includes UEFA Champions League and UEFA Europa League.)		Total	
Club	Season	Division	Apps	Goals	Apps	Goals	Apps	Goals	Apps	Goals
Shkëndija	2011–12	Macedonian First Football League	26	2	0	0	1	0	27	2
Shkëndija	2012–13	Macedonian First Football League	29	4	0	0	2	0	31	4
Shkëndija	Total		55	6	0	0	3	0	58	6
Wil	2013–14	Swiss Challenge League	30	6	1	0	—		31	6
Wil	2014–15	Swiss Challenge League	35	5	3	0	—		38	3
Wil	2015–16	Swiss Challenge League	30	5	1	0	—		31	5
Wil	2016–17	Swiss Challenge League	3	0	0	0	—		3	0
Wil	Total		98	16	5	0	—		103	17
Schaffhausen	2016–17	Swiss Challenge League	16	3	0	0	—		16	3
St. Gallen	2017–18	Swiss Super League	14	0	2	1	—		16	1
Grasshoppers	2017–18	Swiss Super League	13	0	1	0	—		14	0
Grasshoppers	2018–19	Swiss Super League	0	0	0	0	—		0	0
Grasshoppers	Total		13	0	1	0	—		14	0
Career total			136	25	8	0	3	0	207	27

=== International ===
As of 27 March 2018

Appearances and goals by national team and year
National team	Year	Apps	Goals
Kosovo	2018	1	0
Total		1	0
